= List of Soviet films of 1943 =

A list of films produced in the Soviet Union in 1943 (see 1943 in film).

== 1943 ==
Title	Original title	Director	Cast	Genre	Notes
1943
Actress	Актриса	Leonid Trauberg	Galina Sergeyeva	Comedy	
Dream	Мечта	Mikhail Romm	Yelena Kuzmina, Vladimir Solovyov, Vladimir Shcheglov	Drama	
The Front	Фронт	Vasilyev brothers	Boris Zhukovsky	War drama	
In the Name of the Fatherland	Во имя Родины	Vsevolod Pudovkin and Dmitriy Vasilyev	Nikolai Kryuchkov, Yelena Tyapkina	War film	
Kutuzov	Кутузов	Vladimir Petrov	Aleksei Dikiy	Drama	
Nasreddin in Bukhara	Насреддин в Бухаре	Yakov Protazanov	Lev Sverdlin	Comedy	
She Defends the Motherland	Она защищает Родину	Fridrikh Ermler	Vera Maretskaya	War drama	
Stalingrad	Сталинград	Leonid Varlamov			
Ukraine in Flames	Битва за нашу Советскую Украину	Alexander Dovzhenko		Documentary	
The Aerial Cabman	Воздушный извозчик	Gerbert Rappaport	Mikhail Zharov	Comedy	
Two Soldiers	Два бойца	Leonid Lukov	Boris Andreyev, Mark Bernes	War film	
Wait for Me	Жди меня	Aleksandr Stolper, Boris Ivanov	Boris Blinov, Valentina Serova	War film	
The Young Fritz	Юный Фриц	Grigori Kozintsev, Leonid Trauberg	Mikhail Zharov		

== See also ==
- 1943 in the Soviet Union
