= Julius Telesin =

Russian-Israeli Mathematician

Julius Zinovyevich Telesin (Russian: Юлиус Зиновьевич Телесин, Julius Zinov'evič Telesin; born April 1, 1933, in Moscow) is a Russian-Israeli mathematician, human rights activist, chess player, poet, and translator. He was a notable participant in the Soviet samizdat culture of the 1960s. He emigrated to Israel where he lived since 1970. He taught mathematics at the University of Beersheba.

Telesin was born on April 1, 1933, in Moscow. He is the son of Jewish Yiddish-language poet Zyama Telesin (Зяма Телесин / Zinovy Lvovich Telesin; 1907, Kalinkovichi, Minsk province – 1996, Jerusalem). His mother was the poet Rakhil (Rachel) Boymvol.

== 1001 anekdot ==
Telesin compiled a collection of 1001 Soviet political jokes published in 1986 in Tenafly, New Jersey (Hermitage Press). Bruce Friend Adams, who cites it in his study of Soviet and Russian history through jokes, praised it as the most clever and funny presentation of such material:

There are many collections of Soviet anecdotes. The funniest, most clever presentation of a large number of these that I have seen is Iulius Telesin's 1001 Izbrannyi Sovetskii Politicheskii Anekdot. Telesin arranged 1001 well-chosen anecdotes topically and added humorous rhyming quatrains called chastushki (the Russian equivalent of limericks), excerpts from Soviet dissident publications such as the Khronika tekushchikh sobytii (Chronicle of Current Events) and other snippets to make a very entertaining book.

— Bruce Friend Adams, Tiny Revolutions in Russia (Introduction, p. 1)

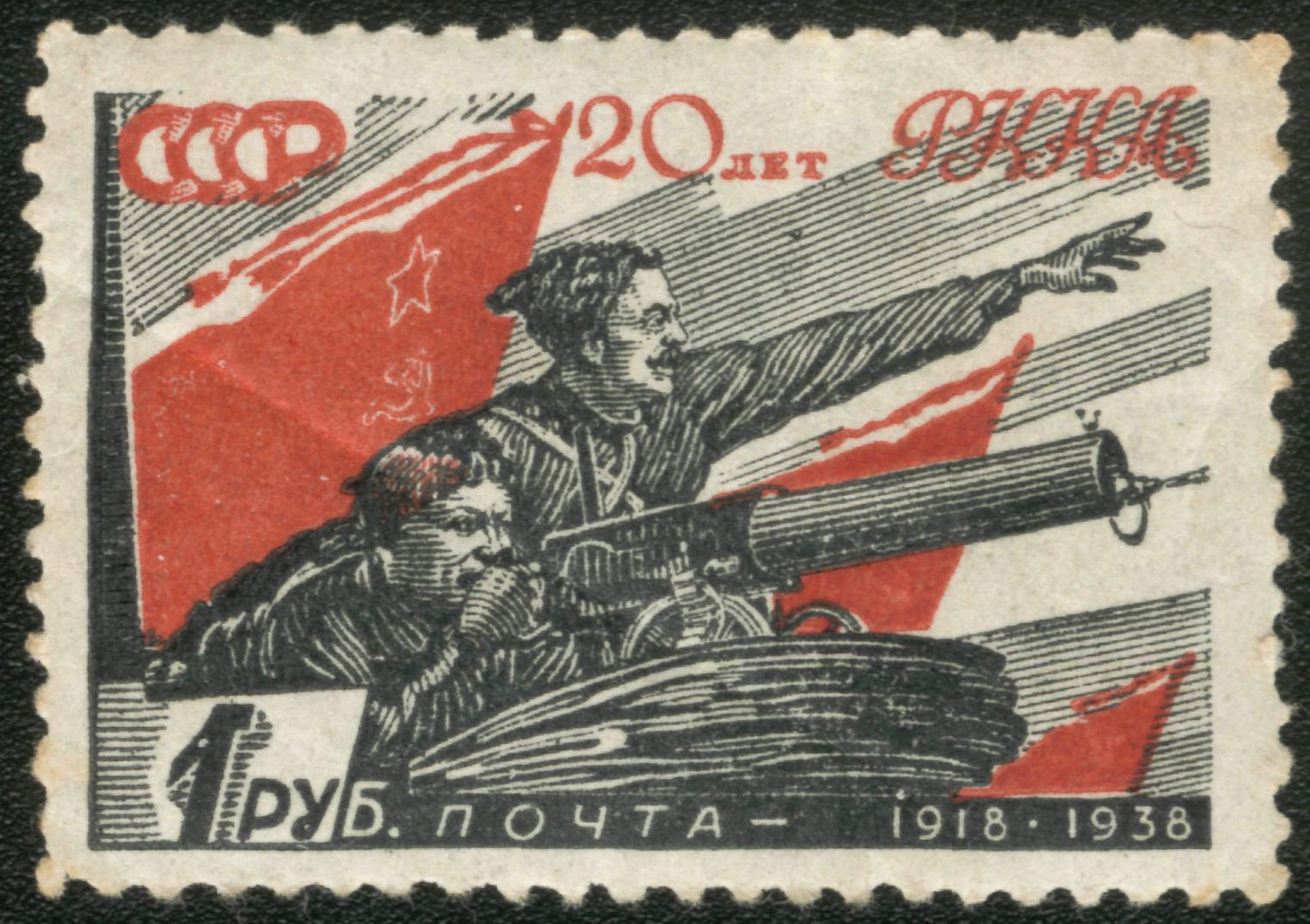
Soviet stamp (1938) featuring Vasily Chapayev, Petka and a Maxim gun, referencing the film Chapayev

The book includes jokes involving Stalin, Rabinovich, Khrushchev, Chapayev, Petka, Trotsky, Kosygin, Mao, Brezhnev, Gierek, Lenin, Dzerzhinsky, Radio Yerevan, Carter, Vovochka, Molotov, Furtseva, Chernenko and many others.

Example (Joke No. 43):

Why did Lenin wear shoes, and Stalin boots? – Because under Lenin, the filth in Russia only reached the ankles.

== Selected publications ==
- 1001 izbrannyj sovetskij političeskij anekdot. Tenafly, NJ: Hermitage Press, 1986.
- Samizdat in Brief: An Introductory Article. 1973.
- Foreword to Peter Reddaway, Uncensored Russia: Protest and Dissent in the Soviet Union; the Unofficial Moscow Journal, a Chronicle of Current Events. New York: American Heritage Press, 1972.
- Detstvo v tyurʹme: memuary Petra Yakira (Childhood in Prison: Recollections of Pyotr Yakir). London: Macmillan, 1972.
- Teoriya kombinatsiy (Theory of Combinations). Jerusalem: Ivan Marton, 1992.
- Shutkovanie nad bezdnoy (Joking over the Abyss). Jerusalem: J. Telesin, 2009.
- Stishki o suverennoi demokratii (Poems about Sovereign Democracy). Jerusalem: J. Telesin, 2008.

== See also ==
- Chastushka
- Chronicle of Current Events (Khroniki tekushchikh sobytii)
- Russian jokes / political jokes
