= Nina Onilova =

Soviet machine gunner

- Born: 10 April 1921; Novonikolayevka, Ukrainian Soviet Socialist Republic (now in Odessa Oblast, Ukraine)
- Died: 8 March 1942 (aged 20); Mekenziya, Crimean ASSR, Russian SFSR, Soviet Union (now in Crimea Autonomous Republic, Ukraine)
- Burial place: Communards Cemetery, Sevastopol, Ukraine
- Military career
- Allegiance: Soviet Union
- Branch: Red Army
- Service years: 1941–1942
- Rank: Senior sergeant
- Units: 54th Rifle Regiment; 25th Rifle Division; Separate Coastal Army
- Conflicts: World War II; Crimean Front; Battle of Odessa; Battle of Sevastopol (DOW)
- Awards: Hero of the Soviet Union; Order of Lenin; Order of the Red Banner

Nina Andreyevna Onilova (Russian: Нина Андреевна Онилова, Ukrainian: Ніна Андріївна Онілова; 10 April 1921 – 8 March 1942) was a Soviet machine gunner in the Red Army's 25th Rifle Division who fought the Germans near Odessa and Sevastopol from 1941 to 1942.

Awarded the Order of the Red Banner after destroying a German tank, Onilova was mortally wounded in a German attack during the Battle of Sevastopol. She was posthumously awarded the honorary title of Hero of the Soviet Union with the Order of Lenin in 1965.

== Early life ==
Nina Onilova was born in 1921 near Odessa, a daughter of Ukrainian peasants and was brought up at an Odessa orphanage after her parents' death. She was a member of the Komsomol and joined the workforce as a textile factory worker before World War II.

Onilova developed an interest in gunnery after attending a screening of Chapayev, a popular 1930s film based on the life of Russian Civil War commander Vasily Chapayev that starred Varvara Myasnikova as Anka, a courageous woman machine gunner, and took gunnery training lessons from her factory's paramilitary training club.

== Military career ==
The armies of Nazi Germany invaded the Soviet Union on 22 June 1941. Onilova volunteered for service in the Red Army when the Siege of Odessa commenced in August 1941. She was originally made a medic in 54th Rifle Regiment in the 25th Rifle Division of the Separate Coastal Army, but soon used her prewar training to prove herself as a gunner when she picked up her comrades' jammed machine gun, quickly cleared it, and used it to repulse a detachment of advancing Germans.

Onilova was badly wounded as the Germans continued their siege in September 1941, but chose to remain with her unit when it subsequently fell back to positions around Sevastopol alongside the rest of the Coastal Army in preparation for the German assault on the Crimean Peninsula and the city of Sevastopol, a Crimean port used as a strategic naval base by the Black Sea Fleet.

Onilova took part in the defense of Sevastopol at the village of Mekenziya, about seven miles east of the city center. In November 1941, she crawled across twenty-five yards of open ground to destroy a German tank with two Molotov cocktails, for which she was promoted to sergeant and awarded the Order of the Red Banner.

A machine gun crew commander and senior sergeant by spring 1942, Onilova was seriously wounded for the second time during a German attack on Mekenziya on 1 March 1942, in which she singlehandedly fought on after the rest of the gun crew were killed.

Taken to a Soviet hospital in the aftermath, she spent her time drafting an unfinished letter to Myasnikova about herself on the spare pages of a school notebook she had brought with her. She died on 8 March 1942 at age twenty, and was interred at Sevastopol's Communards Cemetery.

Though commemorated during and after the war, Senior Sergeant Onilova was only recognized as a Hero of the Soviet Union at the twentieth anniversary of the war's end when she was posthumously awarded the title by the Presidium of the Supreme Soviet of the USSR on 14 May 1965.

== See also ==
- List of female Heroes of the Soviet Union
- Manshuk Mametova
- Danute Staneliene
