= Vasilyev Brothers State Prize of the RSFSR =

Former annual art prize in Russia

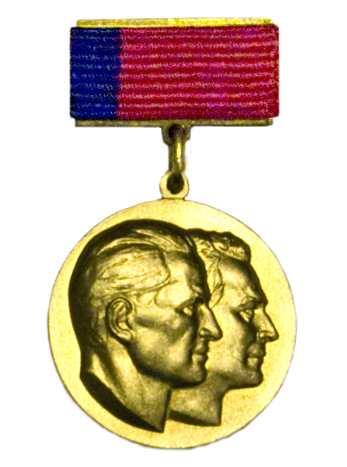
The Vasilyev Brothers State Prize

The Vasilyev Brothers State Prize of the RSFSR was an annual State Prize established by the Council of Ministers of the RSFSR (Russian Soviet Federative Socialist Republic) in 1965. Three Vasilyev Brothers prizes were awarded annually from 1966 until 1990 for cinematographic works of all kinds (fiction, documentary, non-fiction and animated) and for work by screenwriters, directors, actors, camera operators, artists, sound engineers and consultants. A winner was awarded the title "Laureate of RSFSR State Prize" and was presented with a diploma and badge of honour.

The Vasilyev brothers were two unrelated Russian Soviet film directors, Georgi Vasiliev (Russian: Георгий Николаевич Васильев, 1899 – 1946) and Sergei Vasiliev (Russian: Сергей Дмитриевич Васильев, 1900 – 1959).

== See also ==
- State Prize of the Russian Federation
