= Red Comrades Save the Galaxy =

1998 video game

- Developers: S.K.I.F. Buka Entertainment; Android porting Eltechs
- Publisher: Buka Entertainment
- Director: Vyacheslav Pismenny
- Producer: Alexander Mikhailov
- Programmers: Artem Bovin; Ilya Kreer
- Artist: Oleg Zakharov
- Writers: Vyacheslav Pismenny; Oleg Zakharov; Kim Belov; Sergey Korsakov; Svyatoslav Merlin
- Composer: Vadim Kruglov
- Series: Pete (game series)
- Engine: Unity 3D
- Platforms: Original version Microsoft Windows; Reloaded macOS, iOS, Microsoft Windows, Android, Linux
- Release: Original version November 1998; Reloaded; February 18, 2016
- Genre: Graphic adventure
- Mode: Single-player

Red Comrades Save the Galaxy^{[a]} is a 1998 point-and-click graphic adventure game. Developed by S.K.I.F. and published by Buka Entertainment, it is the first installment in the eponymous series. On February 18, 2016, a remastered version was released, which was compatible with newer Windows OS versions and wide-screen displays and supported English subtitles.

== Gameplay ==
Red Comrades Save the Galaxy is a point-and-click adventure game in which the player guides three main characters — Pete, Vasily Ivanovich Chapaev, and Anka — through the game's world. Players can control the main characters through various commands; by default, players can move around (Go) and look for objects (Look) by left-clicking on the screen, while the three remaining commands (Talk, Take, and Use) are available from a drop-down main menu opened by right-clicking anywhere on the game screen.

Players can also access an inventory menu, which offers them three more options on the lid. These include the game's map (which allows fast-travel between locations), a character photograph (allowing players to interact with elements as that character) and the pause menu (also accessible by pressing the Escape key). Protagonists move using several postures determined by animation. Communication with certain characters results in branched (2-4 variants max) dialogues. Minigames may utilize specific single-use interface types. The remastered version allows switching between traditional and touchscreen-based interface systems.

== Plot ==
Some elements of the plot are adapted from the novel Chapaev by Dmitry Furmanov, and borrows Russian anecdotes from the Soviet era heavily. An alien colonist ship passing through the system loses control and becomes Earth's Moon. A few aliens, placed in suspended animation, survive until 1917.

In 1917, a shot from the Russian Navy cruiser Aurora's main gun signals the beginning of the October Revolution of 1917, but drunken sailors miss the Tsar's Winter Palace and hit the Moon instead. This shot awakens the remaining crew, who decide to invade Earth.

While preparing for the invasion, the aliens accidentally discover with their telescope a wooden sign with the scratched words: 'Backwoods is a Hub of the Earth' - in a remote Russian village, Backwoods. Misled by the sign, the aliens attempt to conquer the village. Meanwhile, Russia is in the midst of the Russian Civil War, with Bolsheviks trying to clear the area of anti-communist forces. Both the front line and Ural River split the village of Backwoods in two. The stalemate between the two sides sets the scene for the alien invasion.

== Main characters ==
- Vasily Ivanovich Chapaev: The division commander of Red Army inspired by the folk hero from Furmanov's works.
- Pete: Chapaev's holder of an order. He is described as an oddball in the game, yet is Chapaev's most trusted ally.
- Anka: A skilled scouter and expert counter-terrorist hunting extremist groups, and an arms and demolitions expert.

== Development ==
The idea of making an adventure game with Pete and Chapaev as main characters arose somewhere in early 1996, as the editors of SBG Magazine e-zine were speculating on the idea of a "perfect adventure game" and its possible publisher. Discussions led to the decision of making their own game in that genre, with the three main heroes of popular jokes as protagonists. Afterwards, development process started sometime in mid-1996. The entire editorial staff of the e-zine were involved in the development process, with Vyacheslav Pismenny as the project's lead script writer and Oleg Zakharov as the lead artist.

In December 1997, the editors officially announced the game through the issue #797 of the SBG Magazine. Titled "The Birth of a BlockBuster or How to Make an Adventure Game in 9 Months...", the article partially covered the development process, included the game's synopsis, and presented a dozen screenshots. In addition to that, Pismenny gave interviews to several video game magazines, including Game World Navigator. It was around that time that the contract with the publisher, Buka Entertainment, was signed. The game's development took SBG Studio (later renamed to S.K.I.F.) two and a half years to finish; one extra year before the planned release.

Its release marked the first 3-CD game release in Russia. Labelled a "jewel box" release, its development model was recognized to cut production costs of all copies, increasing the total print produced. Regardless, the collector's edition was released shortly afterwards as well. The game also propelled the "Russian adventure game" genre, expanding Russia's recognition as a video game producer on a global scale, alongside releases including Pilot Brothers: Chasing the Striped Elephant (Russian: Братья Пилоты: По следам полосатого слона), and GAG (Russian: ГЭГ).

In June 1998, a non-interactive demo of the game was released, which included descriptive information about the game as well as animated scenes from it. Ahead of the game's scheduled retail release of Q3 1998, a video demo was presented as part of its marketing strategy, showing a few characters and locations from the game. The game was released in early November 1998.

On September 11, 2014, the original version was released for Android devices as shareware. Buka Entertainment remained the publisher, while ElTechs ported the game by means of virtualization.

== Remastered version ==
On February 18, 2016, a remastered version compatible with newer Windows operating systems and wide-screen displays was released on Steam. It features both a unitary cursor system and the traditional system, with major quality-of-life improvements. These include revocalized dialogues, more detailed backgrounds for certain locations, and the localization of the text to English. However, audio and certain graphic components such as text on signs were not translated.

A portrait of Vladimir Putin as the Emperor of Russia was also inserted; at the time of the game's original release, he was still the head of the Russian Federal Security Service (FSB).

== Notes ==
Russian: Петька и Василий Иванович спасают галактику, romanized: Pet'ka i Vasilij Ivanovič spasajut galaktiku
