= Georgi Vasilyev =

Soviet film director (1899–1946)

- Georgi Vasilyev
- Born: Georgi Nikolayevich Vasilyev; 25 November 1899; Vologda, Vologda Governorate, Russian Empire
- Died: 18 June 1946 (aged 46); Ljubljana, Yugoslavia
- Occupations: Film director, screenwriter
- Years active: 1924–1943
- Notable work: Chapaev (1934)
- Awards: Stalin Prize (1941,1942)

Georgi Nikolayevich Vasilyev (Russian: Гео́ргий Никола́евич Васи́льев; 25 November 1899 – 18 June 1946) was a Soviet film director, screenwriter and actor. From 1928 to 1943, together with Sergei Vasilyev (often jointly, though incorrectly credited as Vasilyev brothers), he co-directed several films, including an influential and critically acclaimed Chapaev (1934). Georgi Vasilyev received two Stalin Prizes in 1941 and 1942.

== Filmography ==
Year	English title	Russian title	Work
1928	Heroic Deed Among the Ice	Подвиг во льдах	Director; documentary
1930	The Sleeping Beauty	Спящая красавица	Director, screenwriter
1932	A Personal Affair	Личное дело	Director, screenwriter
1934	Chapaev	Чапаев	Director, screenwriter, actor
1937	The Defense of Volotchayevsk	Волочаевские дни	Director, screenwriter
1942	The Defense of Tsaritsyn	Оборона Царицына	Director, screenwriter
1943	The Front	Фронт	Director, screenwriter

== Honors and awards ==
- Honoured Worker of the Arts Industry of the RSFSR (1940)
- Stalin Prize:
  - first class (1941) – for Chapaev
  - first class (1942) – for the 1st series of The Defense of Tsaritsyn
- Order of Lenin (1935) – for Chapaev
- Order of the Red Star (1944)
- Medal "For Valiant Labour in the Great Patriotic War 1941–1945" (1945)
