= Yuri Muzykant =

Yuri Aleksandrovich (Shayevich) Muzykant (Russian: Юрий Александрович (Ша́евич) Музыкант; 7 April 1900 - 3 October 1962), was a Soviet actor, film director, and screenwriter.

== Biography ==
He was in St. Petersburg to Shai Peysakhovich (russified as Alexander Pavlovich), a Jewish goldsmith who died in 1916. He had a younger brother, Rafail, who also became a filmmaker. The family lived on Kazanskaya Street, then Razezdey Street. From 1911 to 1919 he studied at a vocational school, then at Military Medical Academy, from which he graduated in 1922. The same year he entered the acting department of the Screen Art Institute in Leningrad, graduating in 1924. Beginning in 1928 he pursued a career as a film actor, but by the 1930s had switched his focus to directing.

During World War II he participated in the defense of Leningrad and on the Belorussian front, initially with the People's Militia and later with the regular Red Army. Later he worked as a physical therapist for soldiers with lower limb injuries, and as a political officer in the army hospital. After the war he returned to the Lenfilm studio.

He died in Leningrad in 1962 and was buried at Preobrazhenskoye Jewish Cemetery.

== Filmography ==
=== Actor ===
- 1934 — Crown Prince of the Republic

=== Director ===
- 1928 — The Mullah's Third Wife (Третья жена муллы) (lost film)
- 1937 — Za Sovetskiyu Rodinu (За Советскую Родину) (also screenwriter)
- 1939 — Arinka (Аринка)
- 1952 — Razlom (Разлом)
- 1957 — Vsego dorozhe (Всего дороже)
- 1958 — Puchina (Пучина) (also screenwriter)
- 1959 — Dostigaev i drugie (Достигаев и другие) (also screenwriter)
- 1960 — Aesop (also screenwriter)

=== Assistant Director ===
- 1934 — Chapaev (Чапаев) (with the Vasilyev brothers)

=== Screenwriter ===
- 1929 — Bunt babushek (Бунт бабушек)
