= Chegodaevo, Moscow =

Village in Troitsky Administrative Okrug

Chegodaevo Чегодаево
- Village
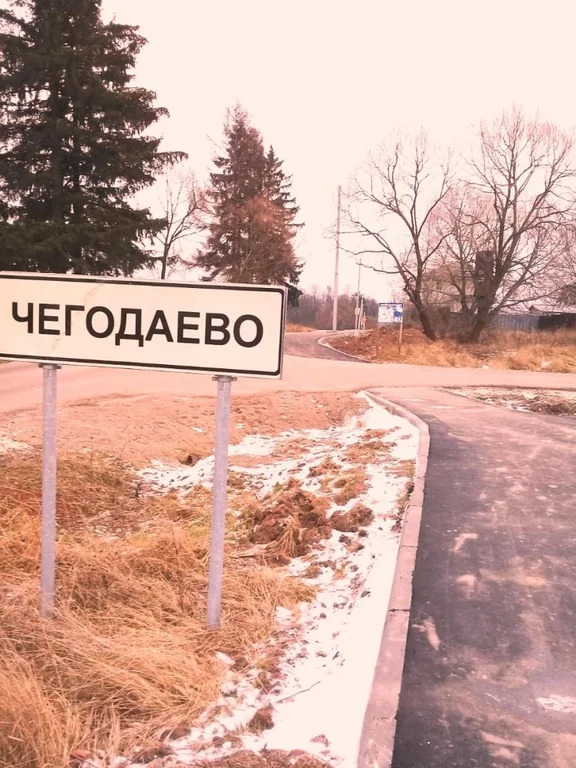
- The entrance of Chegodaevo
- Interactive map of Chegodaevo
- Coordinates: 55°20′06″N 37°23′17″E
- Country: Russia
- Okrug: Troitsky

Population
  - Total: 134
- Time zone: UTC+3:00
- Postal code: 142136

Chegodaevo is a settlement in the Troitsky Administrative Okrug, located on the banks of the Mocha river. It's 55 km (34 mi) away from Moscow.

== History ==
In an 1859 audit by the Ministry of Internal Affairs, Chegodaevo was reported to have 18 households (52 men and 70 women). According to a 1899 report, there were 110 inhabitants.

From 1963 to 1965, it was part of the enlarged Leninsky rural district in the Moscow Region.

== Economy ==
The main employer of the village is the Klenovo-Chegodaevo dairy factory, which owns the agriculture fields to the north of the village.
