= Nikolay Simonov (actor) =

Soviet film and stage actor

Nikolai Simonov
- Николай Симонов
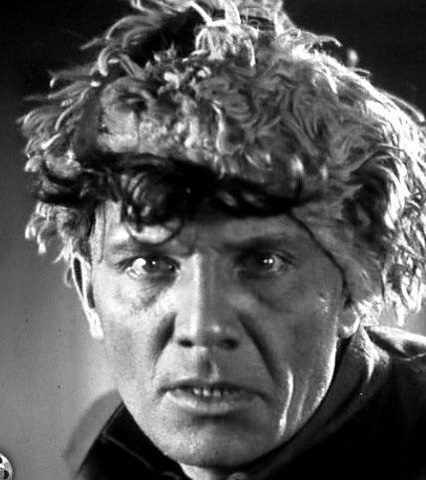
- Simonov in Chapaev (1934)
- Born: 4 December 1901; Samara, Russian Empire
- Died: 20 April 1973 (aged 71); Leningrad, Russian SFSR, Soviet Union
- Occupation: Actor

Nikolay Konstantionovich Simonov (Russian: Николай Константинович Симонов; 4 December 1901 – 20 April 1973) was a Soviet film and stage actor, who was named People's Artist of the USSR (1950).

== Biography ==
=== Early life and education ===
Nikolay Simonov was born on 4 December 1901, in Samara, Russia. From 1917 to 1919, he studied art at Samara School of Art and Design. From 1919 to 1923, he studied art at the Imperial Academy of Arts. From 1922 to 1924, he studied acting at the Saint Petersburg State Theatre Arts Academy, from which he graduated with honors in 1924.

=== Career ===
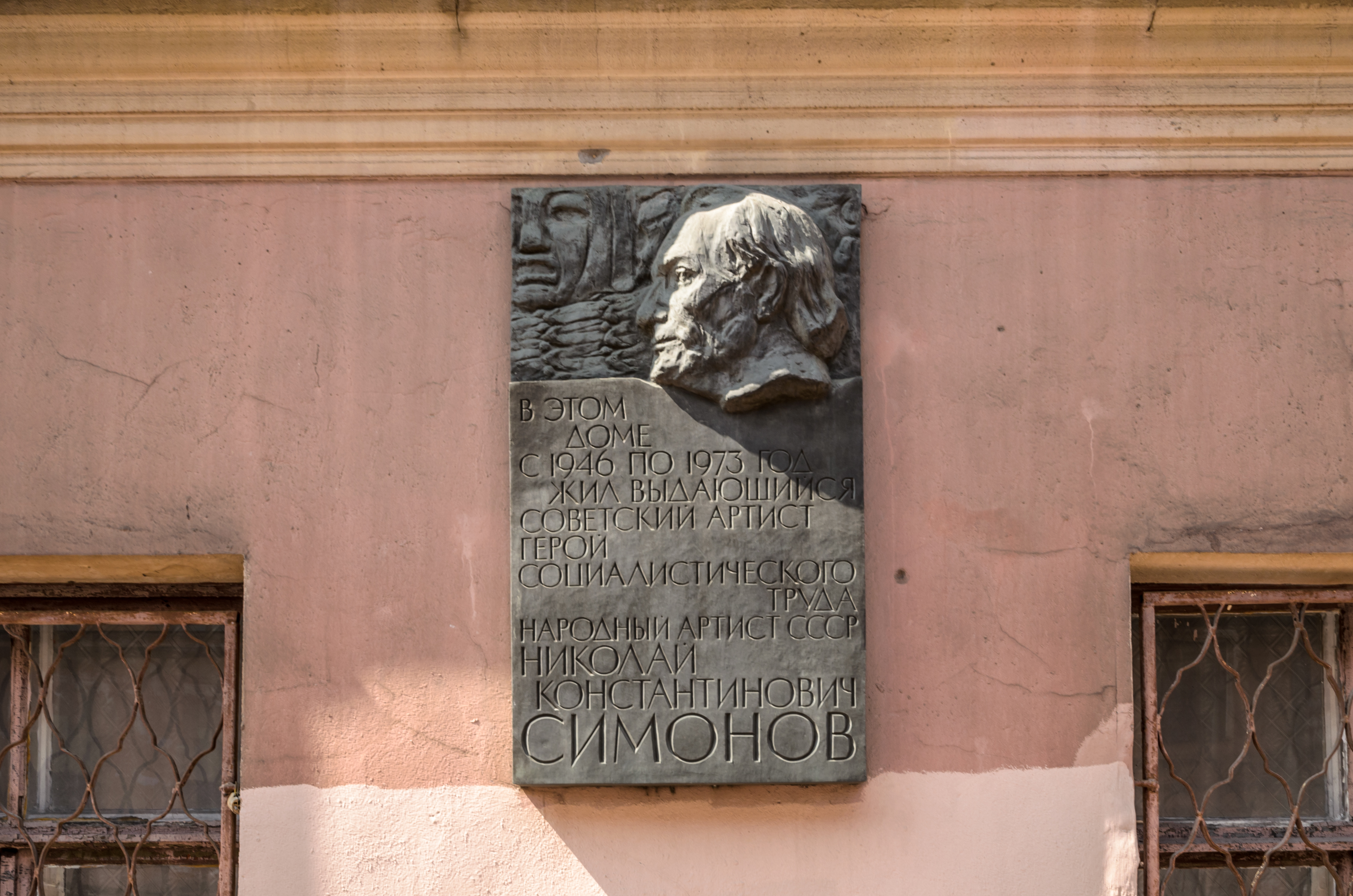
Nikolay Simonov commemorative plaque in Saint Petersburg

From 1924 to 1973, He was a permanent member with the company of Pushkin Drama Theatre in St. Petersburg. During the 1950s and 1960s, he was also the theatre's artistic director.

Simonov made his film debut in 1924 and played supporting roles in five Russian silent films. He shot to fame after his role of Commander Zhikharev in the classic film Chapaev (1934) by the Vasilyev brothers.

Simonov's portrayal of Peter the Great in The Conquests of Peter the Great (1937 and 1938) brought him international fame and numerous awards. This portrayal was the one used to define Peter the Great for American audiences in Frank Capra's 1943 propaganda film The Battle of Russia, which used brief clips from the Soviet films.

Simonov was considered to be a patriarch of the St. Petersburg school of acting. Simonov's stage performances were legendary; several of his stage works were filmed for a historic record. His leading role in The Living Corpse, an adaptation of the book by Leo Tolstoy, is remembered as one of the highest achievements in stage acting in Russian theatre. Simonov's portrayal of Antonio Salieri in Mozart and Salieri from The Little Tragedies by Alexander Pushkin won him a Stanislavski State Prize award in 1962. Simonov regarded acting on stage as superior to acting in film; he supported the similar position of Constantin Stanislavski and Vladimir Nemirovich-Danchenko.

=== Marriage and children ===
Simonov was also the father of a remarkable family. His wife was an actress and his son, Nikolay Nikolaevich Simonov, was a famous surgeon in Russia.

=== Death and afterward ===
Nikolay Simonov died on 20 April 1973, in Leningrad (now St. Petersburg) and was laid to rest in the Necropolis of Masters of Arts at Alexander Nevsky Lavra.

== Filmography ==
- Red Partisans (1924) as Dolgov
- Devyatoe yanvarya (1925)
- Vzduvayte gorny (1925)
- Katerina Izmailova (1927) as Sergey
- Kastus Kalinovskiy (1928) as Kastus Kalinovskiy
- Kapitanskaya dochka (1928) as Grigory Orlov, Count
- Khabu (1928) as Yegor
- Syn rybaka (1929)
- Brother (1929) as Fyodor Gorbachyov
- Kain i Artem (1930) as Artem
- The Sleeping Beauty (1930) as Worker
- A Lad from the Banks of the Missouri (1932) as Iogann Timan
- Miracles (1934) as Fyodor, his son
- Chapaev (1934) as Zhikharev - kombrig (brigade commander)
- Hectic Days (1935) as Tank Commander Mikhail Trofimovich Belokon
- Peter the Great (1937) as Peter the Great – Stalin Prize first degree (1941)
- Peter the Great II (1938) as Peter the Great
- Patriot (1939) as Ilya Golovin
- Vozvrashchenie (1940) as Sergey Petrovich Ivanov
- Ostrov Bezymyannyy (1946) as Major Maleev
- The Battle of Stalingrad (1949, Part I and II) as Lt. Gen. Vasily Chuikov – Stalin Prize first degree (1950)
- Living Dead (1952) as Fyodor Protasov
- Belinsky (1953) as landlord
- Geroite na Shipka (1955) as Otto von Bismarck
- The Gadfly (1955) as Cardinal Montanelli
- Serdtse byotsya vnov (1956) as professor Peskov
- Amphibian Man (1962) as Prof. Salvator
- Gde-to est syn (1962) as Kharlampiy
- Workers' Settlement (1965) as Sotnikov
- On the Same Planet (1966) as Robbins – amerikanskiy polkovnik
- Rytsar mechty (1969) as Boy's Father Boatswain
- Suspicion (1972, TV Movie) as Berlach (final film role)

== Awards and honors ==
- 1938: Order of Lenin
- 1941: Stalin Prize first degree
- 1947: Stalin Prize second degree
- 1950: Stalin Prize first degree
- 1950: People's Artist of the USSR for his role of General Chuikov
- 1966: Stanislavsky State Prize of the RSFSR for the performance of roles Matthias Clausen and Salieri in productions of "Before Sunset" by Hauptmann, and "Little Tragedies" by Pushkin
- 1967: Order of Lenin
- 1971: Hero of Socialist Labour
- 1971: Order of Lenin
