= Annushka (film) =

1959 film

- Russian poster
- Russian: Аннушка
- Directed by: Boris Barnet
- Written by: Efraim Sevela
- Starring: Irina Skobtseva; Anastasiya Georgievskaya; Boris Babochkin; Galina Tokareva; Lev Barashkov
- Cinematography: Viktor Masevich
- Music by: Yuriy Biryukov
- Production company: Mosfilm
- Release date: 1959
- Running time: 71 minutes
- Country: Soviet Union

Annushka (Russian: Аннушка) is a 1959 Soviet drama film directed by Boris Barnet.

== Plot ==
The film tells about a Soviet woman, who survived the loss of her husband as a result of the war, alone raised children.

== Starring ==
- Irina Skobtseva as Annushka
- Anastasiya Georgievskaya as Polina Sergeyevna
- Boris Babochkin as Ivan Ivanovich
- Galina Tokareva as Nina
- Lev Barashkov as Sasha
- Eduard Martsevich as Vovka
- Olga Aroseva as Vovka's mother
- Elena Korolyova as Granata
- Valentina Vladimirova as Nastya
- Stanislav Chekan as russian soldier
- Lev Zolotukhin as Pyotr Denisov
- Yevgeny Morgunov as speculator
