= Sergei Vasilyev (director) =

Soviet film director (1900–1959)

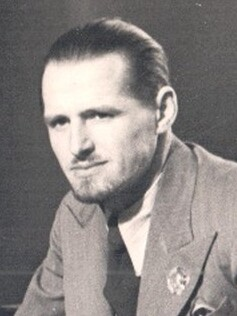
- Born: 4 November 1900; Moscow, Russian Empire
- Died: 16 December 1959 (aged 59); Moscow, Soviet Union
- Occupations: Actor, film director, screenwriter
- Years active: 1923–1958
- Notable work: Chapaev (1934)
- Title: People's Artist of the USSR (1948)
- Spouse: Varvara Myasnikova

Sergei Dmitrievich Vasilyev (Russian: Серге́й Дми́триевич Васи́льев; 4 November 1900, Moscow – 16 December 1959, Moscow) was a Soviet and Russian film director, screenwriter and actor. From 1928 to 1943 together with Georgi Vasilyev (often jointly, though incorrectly credited as the Vasilyev brothers) he co-directed several films, including the influential and critically acclaimed Chapaev (1934). Sergei Vasilyev was granted the honorary title of People's Artist of the USSR in 1948; and received (with Georgi Vasilyev) two Stalin Prizes in 1941 and 1942.

His 1942 film The Defence of Tsaritsyn concerns the Battle of Tsaritsyn during the Russian Civil War, a battle in which Joseph Stalin played a prominent role. In 1942, Tsaritsyn, by then renamed Stalingrad, was in the midst of the decisive Battle of Stalingrad, a turning point of the Second World War.

== Filmography ==
Year	English title	Russian title	Comments
1928	Heroic Deed Among the Ice	Подвиг во льдах	Director; documentary
1930	The Sleeping Beauty	Спящая красавица	Director, screenwriter
1932	A Personal Affair	Личное дело	Director, screenwriter
1934	Chapaev	Чапаев	Director, screenwriter, actor
1937	Volotchayevsk Days	Волочаевские дни	Director, screenwriter
1942	The Defense of Tsaritsyn	Оборона Царицына	Director, screenwriter
1943	The Front	Фронт	Director, screenwriter
1955	Heroes of Shipka	Герои Шипки	Director
1958	The October Days	В дни Октября	Director, screenwriter

== Awards and honours ==
- Honoured Worker of the Arts Industry of the RSFSR (1940)
- People's Artist of the USSR (1948)
- Stalin Prizes;
  - first class (1941) – for the film Chapaev (1934)
  - first class (1942) – for the 1st series of the film The Defence of Tsaritsyn (1941)
- Two Orders of Lenin (1935; 1950)
- Two Orders of the Red Banner of Labour (1950; 1954)
- Order of the Red Star (1944)
- Medal "For Valiant Labour in the Great Patriotic War 1941–1945" (1945)
- Best Director at Cannes (1955) – for the film Heroes of Shipka (the film was nominated for the Palme d'Or)
