= Pyotr Isaev =

Soviet soldier

- Пётр Исаев
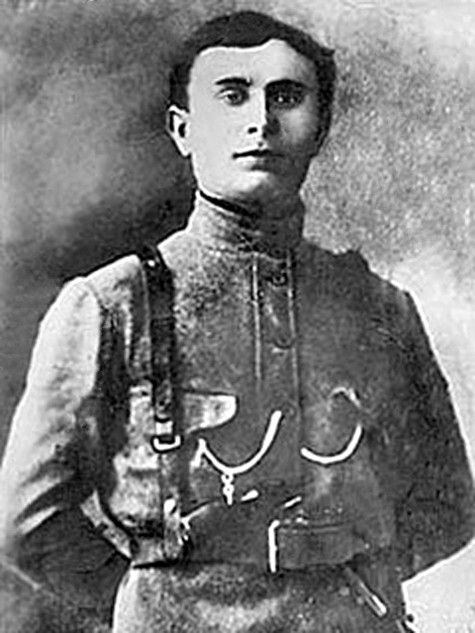
- Isaev in 1918
- Born: July 20, 1890; Korneevka, Nikolaevsky district, Samara Governorate, Russian Empire
- Died: September 5, 1919 (aged 29); Lbishchensk, Ural Oblast, Russian SFSR
- Other names: Petr, Petka, Pete
- Military career
- Allegiance: Russian Empire; Soviet Union
- Rank: Kombat
- Conflicts: World War I; Russian Civil War; Lbischen raid
- Awards: Browning pistol Order of the Red Banner

Pyotr Semyonovich Isaev (Note: Alternatively: Petr) (Russian: Пётр Семёнович Исаев; better known as Petka (Russian: Петька) or Pete; April 20, 1890 – September 5, 1919) was a participant in World War I and the Russian Civil War, assistant to a Red Army commander Vasily Chapayev and commander of the communications battalion.

Thanks to the vivid image of Petka in the film Chapaev, he became the hero of numerous anecdotes about Petka, Vasily Ivanovich and Anka the Machine-Gunner.

== Biography ==
Pyotr was born on July 20, 1890, in the village of Korneevka, Nikolaevsky district, Samara Governorate, Russian Empire. He graduated from the Saratov Realschule.

In World War I, he was a senior non-commissioned officer of the musician team, after being wounded he returned home.

In the spring of 1918, he organized a detachment in Korneevka to suppress the anti-Bolshevik uprising, then in the village of Semyonovka he first met with Vasily Chapayev. Soon he became squadron commander at Chapayev, in the fall he was appointed chief of communications of the 1st brigade of the Chapayev division. Together with Chapayev, he transferred to the 2nd Nikolaev division, where he was the commander of the communications battalion, the assistant to the chief of communications.

=== Versions of death ===
There are several versions of the circumstances of his death.

According to one version, Pyotr died (or shot himself) on September 5, 1919, in a battle during the attack of the Cossacks on the village of Lbischenskaya, where the headquarters of the 25th rifle division was located. According to the version set forth in Dmitry Furmanov's novel Chapaev and then reflected in the film of the same name, after the wounded Chapaev was being transported across the river, Pyotr remained on the shore, fired back and then fired the bullet into himself. According to his grandson, in that battle he was mortally wounded and, together with Chapaev, was buried in an unmarked grave.

According to another version, Isaev shot himself a year later after the death of Chapayev, unable to bear the loss of a close friend.

There is a version that he committed suicide a month after the battle, without finding the body of the deceased commander, or died of wounds at his home after leaving the hospital.

== In culture ==
For the role of Petka in the film Chapaev, Yakov Gudkin was first invited, but ultimately Leonid Kmit was approved.

== Awards ==
For the capture of a White Army spy, Pyotr was awarded a personalized Browning pistol with the inscription "To Pyotr Isaev for courage from the Ural Chekists" (Russian: Петру Исаеву за отвагу от уральских чекистов). Pyotr was also awarded the Order of the Red Banner.

== Personal life ==
He was married to Anna Goldyreva. His grand-niece claims that his wife's name was Fima.

== See also ==
- Pete (game series)
- Red Comrades Save the Galaxy
- Red Comrades 2: For the Great Justice
