= Defense of Tsaritsyn =

Defense of Tsaritsyn may refer to:

- The Battle of Tsaritsyn during the Russian Civil War
- The Defense of Tsaritsyn, a 1942 Soviet film about that battle
