= Boris Babochkin =

Soviet actor, director, and teacher (1904–1975)

- Борис Бабочкин
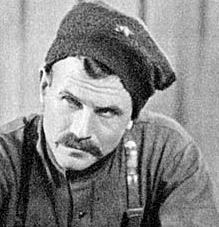
- Babochkin as Chapayev in Chapaev
- Born: 18 January 1904; Saratov, Saratov Governorate, Russian Empire
- Died: 17 July 1975 (aged 71); Moscow, Russian SFSR, Soviet Union
- Occupations: Film and theater actor and director
- Years active: 1921 – 1975
- Spouse: Yekaterina Georgieva
- Awards: Stalin Prize of first degree (1941), Stalin Prize of third degree (1951), USSR State Prize (1977 — posthumously)

Boris Andreyevich Babochkin (Note: Russian: Борис Андреевич Бабочкин, romanized: Boris Andreyevich Babochkin) (18 January 1904 – 17 July 1975) was a Soviet and Russian film and theater actor and director. Boris Babochkin was one of the first internationally recognized stars of the Soviet-Russian cinema. He rose to fame with the title role in the classic film Chapaev (1934) and later, in the 1950s, he played a sharp anti-communist character on stage in Moscow, for which he was censored by the Communist Party of the Soviet Union.

== Biography ==
=== Life on the Volga ===
Babochkin was born on 18 January 1904, in Saratov on the Volga river in Russia. His father, Andrei Babochkin, came from a family of Russian merchants and traders. The father had owned a successful trade business in the city of Saratov on Volga, then sold his business and worked for a railroad. The Babochkins lived in Krasny Kut, a small station near Saratov. His mother, a school teacher, was fond of Russian classical literature, and young Babochkin was brought up in an intellectually stimulating environment. Young Boris Babochkin and his brother were fond of acting and were involved in amateur theatre productions in Saratov. At age 14 Boris joined the Red Army and served for one year in the same front on Volga and the Urals with the legendary commander Chapayev, whom he would later portray, although they never met.

=== Early career ===
In 1920 Babochkin entered a local drama school in Saratov, but he soon dropped out and moved to Moscow to pursue an acting career. At first he enrolled in the well-known drama school of Michael Chekhov affiliated with the Moscow Art Theatre. There Babochkin studied with Michael Chekhov for a few months. He admired Chekhov, but eventually their personalities clashed. In 1921, he left Chekhov's school to join "Molodye Mastera" studio, under Illarion Pevtsov, a well-connected figure in Soviet film and theatre. There, with his elder brother Vitaly Babochkin, Boris worked his first professional season on stage. In the following six years he played seasonal gigs on stage with various troupes in Moscow and Saratov, then in Samarkand and Bishkek in Central Asia, and then in Voronezh, Mogilev in Belarus, and Berdichev in Ukraine.

=== Leningrad ===
From 1927 to 1940 Babochkin lived and worked in Leningrad. He married a young ballerina, Yekaterina Georgieva, and they became involved in the city's cultural life. Babochkin continued his studies of theatre and film, and made his film acting debut at Lenfilm Studio in 1927. In 1934 he played the leading role in Chapaev, a classic film that brought him global fame and local jealousy. During the 1930s he played leading roles at the Leningrad State Pushkin Drama Theater and at the Bolshoi Drama Theater under director Aleksei Dikiy. In 1937, when Dikiy was arrested and imprisoned in the Gulag camps, Babochkin was hurt and suffered an emotional crisis. However, he survived the first wave of Stalin's Great Purge. In 1937 Babochkin stepped in as artistic director of the Bolshoi Drama Theater (BDT) in Leningrad and worked in that position until 1940.

=== Moscow ===
In 1940 Babochkin was summoned by the Soviet leadership and moved back to Moscow, a move that he later described as the biggest mistake in his life. During World War II he made several trips to Leningrad, besieged by the Nazis, where he supported the defenders of Leningrad under the Siege and helped lift their spirits with his performances, while they were struggling to survive. After the war he started a teaching career at the Moscow State Film Institute (VGIK). In 1952 Babochkin became artistic director of the Moscow Drama Theater named after Pushkin. There he invited his old director Aleksei Dikiy to direct Shadows, a play by Saltykov-Shchedrin. In Shadows Babochkin played one of his best roles ever — Klaverov, a corrupt career politician, resembling a typical Soviet bureaucrat. For this role Babochkin was viciously attacked in the main Soviet newspaper Pravda. His critic was none other than Yekaterina Furtseva, who was then Mayor of Moscow and later was made Minister of Culture of the Soviet Union.

Furtseva used all her official power to destroy Babochkin. She banned the play and restricted the world-famous actor, known as Chapayev, from public performances. Furtseva personally ordered that all film studios and drama companies of the USSR should refuse him any jobs, keeping him practically unemployed for three years until he was finally forced to apologize to the Communist Party. Official Soviet censorship, which was under the control of Furtseva, spared no effort in taming the famous actor and manipulating his star power. After that, Babochkin's acting career was restricted to playing only positive, exemplary Soviet characters.

=== Later career ===
Babochkin's acting career was suppressed until the death of his high-ranking Communist opponent Furtseva. The rare exception was his last role in The Flight of Mr. McKinley (1975) for which he was awarded the State Prize of the USSR. From 1955 until his death in 1975, Babochkin was a permanent member of the troupe at the Maly Theatre in Moscow. From 1946 to 1975 he also taught an acting class at State Film Institute (VGIK), where he became a professor in 1966. In his acting career spanning over 55 years, Babochkin played over 200 roles on stage and 25 roles in movies and on television, but his role as Chapayev in the eponymous 1934 film remained the unsurpassed highlight of his film career.

== Recognition ==
Boris Babochkin was the youngest actor designated People's Artist of the RSFSR (1935). He was awarded the Stalin Prize (twice: in 1941 and 1951) and USSR State Prize (1977, posthumously). He also received numerous awards and decorations in recognition of his best known film role as Chapaev.

== Personal life ==
Babochkin was married to Yekaterina Mikhailovna Babochkina (née Georgieva), and the couple had two daughters, Natalia and Tatiana. Outside of his acting career, Babochkin taught a class at Moscow Film School (VGIK); he also wrote numerous articles and critical works about film and theatre. In 1968 he published his autobiography In theatre and film which became a bestseller in the USSR.

Boris Babochkin died of a heart attack while driving his Volga on 17 July 1975, in Moscow, and was interred in Novodevichy Cemetery.

== Sources ==
- Biography of Boris Babochkin in English by: Steve Shelokhonov (2007).
- Autobiography in Russian: (В театре и кино. M. 1968)

== Filmography ==
- Mutiny (1928) as Karavaev
- The Return of Nathan Becker (1932) as Mikulich
- Chapaev (1934) as Vasily Chapayev — Stalin Prize of first degree (1941)
- Girl Friends (1936) as Andrei
- Friends (1938) as Aleksei
- The Defense of Tsaritsyn (1942) as Moldavsky
- Actress (1943) as Pyotr Nikolayevich Markov
- The Front (1943) as Ognyov
- Tale of a True Man (1948) as regiment commander
- Annushka (1959) as Ivan Ivanovich
- The Flight of Mr. McKinley (1975) as Sam Boulder — USSR State Prize (1977 — posthumously)
