= Red Partisans =

1924 film

- Directed by: Vyacheslav Viskovsky
- Written by: Boris Leonidov
- Starring: Nikolay Dirin; Mikhail Lomakin; Nikolai Simonov; Valeri Solovtsov
- Cinematography: Fridrikh Verigo-Darovsky
- Production company: Sevzapkino
- Release date: 1924
- Country: Soviet Union
- Languages: Silent; Russian intertitles

Red Partisans (Russian: Красные партизаны, romanized: Krasnye partizany) is a 1924 Soviet silent war film directed by Vyacheslav Viskovsky.

The film's art direction was by Vladimir Yegorov and Yevgeni Yenej.

== Plot ==
In Siberia, under occupation of the Whites, on the orders of Admiral Kolchak, house searches and mass arrests of the Bolsheviks take place. The underground party committee entrusts Bolshevik worker Tokarev, who managed to avoid arrest, with the organization of a guerrilla unit in the taiga.

Meanwhile, the White Guards occupy one of the Siberian villages, Zubarevka. Violence and looting commence. Peasant Stepan Dolgov, while protecting his wife from the harassment of an officer, kills him and flees into the taiga. Here he meets with Tokarev. Later, they are joined by a group of peasants who have fled from Kolchak's forces. Tokarev and Dolgov form a small guerrilla unit made out of fugitives.

As the White Army declares a general mobilization in Zubarevka, the villagers refuse to join. Tokarev enters the village and leads the male population into his partisan group. Peasants from other villages also join the growing detachment. Tokarev and Dolgov's unit harasses the White forces, disrupting their operations.

Kolchak responds by deploying significant forces to eliminate the partisans. After a fierce battle, the outnumbered guerrillas are forced to retreat. However, Kolchak's attempts to destroy the partisan movement ultimately fail.

As the Red Army begins its offensive along the front, the White Army is pushed eastward, encountering increasing partisan resistance. Together, the Red Army and partisans defeat Admiral Kolchak's forces, resulting in the collapse of the White movement in Siberia.

== Cast ==
- Nikolay Dirin as Officer
- Mikhail Lomakin
- Nikolai Simonov
- Valeri Solovtsov

== Bibliography ==
- Christie, Ian & Taylor, Richard. The Film Factory: Russian and Soviet Cinema in Documents 1896-1939. Routledge, 2012.
