= Chapayevsk =

Town in Samara Oblast, Russia

Chapayevsk Чапаевск
- Town
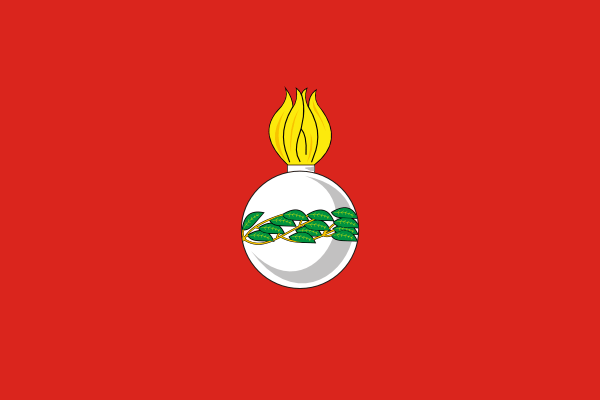
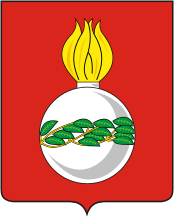
- Flag Coat of arms
- Interactive map of Chapayevsk
- Location of Chapayevsk Chapayevsk (Samara Oblast)
- Coordinates: 52°59′N 49°43′E
- Country: Russia
- Federal subject: Samara Oblast
- Founded: 1908
- Elevation: 50 m (160 ft)

Population (2010 Census)
  - Total: 72,689
  - Estimate (2025): 68,211 (−6.2%)
  - Rank: 217th in 2010

Administrative status
  - Subordinated to: town of oblast significance of Chapayevsk
  - Capital of: town of oblast significance of Chapayevsk

Municipal status
  - Urban okrug: Chapayevsk Urban Okrug
  - Capital of: Chapayevsk Urban Okrug
- Time zone: UTC+4 (MSK+1)
- Postal code: 446100–446116
- OKTMO ID: 36750000001

Chapayevsk (Russian: Чапа́евск) is a town in Samara Oblast, Russia, located 40 kilometers (25 mi) from the city of Samara, on the right bank of the Chapayevka River (a tributary of the Volga River). Population: 72,692 (2010 census); 73,912 (2002 census); 97,984 (1989 Soviet census).

It was previously known as Ivashchenkovo (until 1927), Trotsk (after Leon Trotsky until 1929).

== History ==
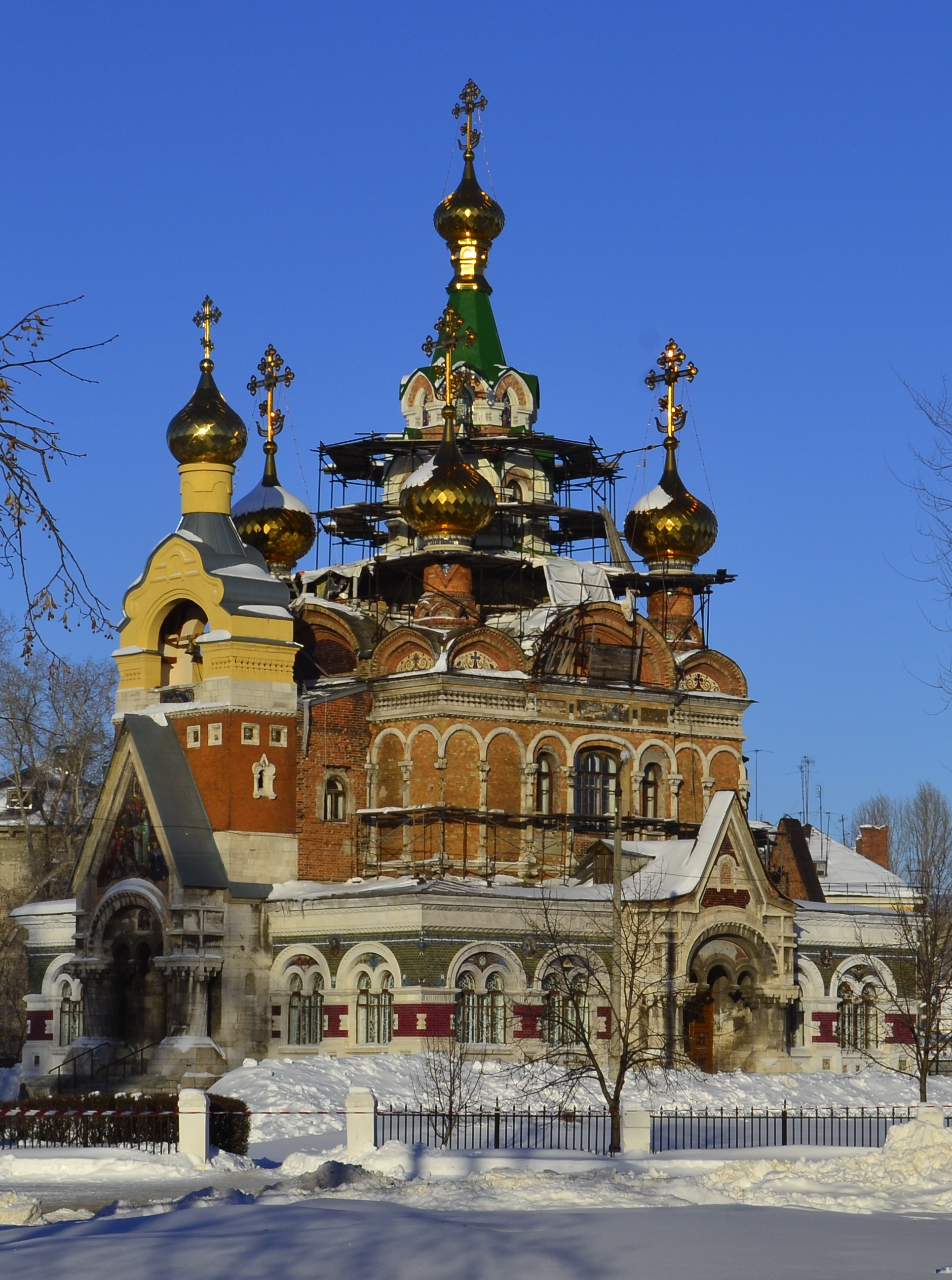
The Church of Saint Sergiy Radonezhsky

The town's history dates back to 1908, when by Nicholas II's decree a military plant was established in the area, where it was given the name Ivashchenkovo. In 1929, the settlement was renamed Chapayevsk after the Red Army commander Vasily Chapayev. The town served as a base for secret military production, hosting four such factories until the dissolution of the Soviet Union in 1991.

On June 18, 2013, several strong explosions rocked the town and several villages around; 5,000 people were evacuated. According to Russian media, at least 34 people were injured in the explosions that originated in the town's ammunition storage facilities.

== Geography ==
The town is located 40 kilometers (25 mi) from the city of Samara, on the right bank of the Chapayevka River (a tributary of the Volga River).

Chapayevsk is known as the "town of death" due to the high amount of toxins present in the environment. According to doctors, more than 80% of children suffer from chronic diseases. Since 1991, the birthrate in the city decreased by 40%. In the women's breast milk dioxin was found at 400 times above the normal level. In 1994, a special committee of the United Nations, after much research announced the town of Chapayevsk as an ecological disaster zone.

== Administrative and municipal status ==
Within the framework of administrative divisions, it is, together with one rural locality, incorporated as the town of oblast significance of Chapayevsk—an administrative unit with the status equal to that of the districts. As a municipal division, the town of oblast significance of Chapayevsk is incorporated as Chapayevsk Urban Okrug.
