= Mumu (1959 film) =

- Russian poster
- Russian: Муму
- Directed by: Anatoliy Bobrovskiy; Evgeniy Teterin
- Written by: Khrisanf Khersonsky; Ivan Turgenev
- Starring: Afanasi Kochetkov; Nina Grebeshkova; Yelena Polevitskaya; Igor Bezyayev; Ivan Ryzhov
- Cinematography: Konstantin Petrichenko
- Edited by: V. Chekan
- Music by: Aleksey Muravlyov
- Production company: Mosfilm
- Release date: 1959
- Running time: 70 minutes
- Country: Soviet Union
- Language: Russian

Mumu (Russian: Муму) is a 1959 Soviet drama film directed by Anatoliy Bobrovskiy and Evgeniy Teterin. It is based on the short story "Mumu" by Ivan Turgenev.

== Plot ==
The film tells about the dumb serf and his faithful dog MuMu.

== Cast ==
- Afanasi Kochetkov as Gerasim
- Nina Grebeshkova as Tatyana
- Yelena Polevitskaya as The Mistress
- Igor Bezyayev as Kapiton
- Ivan Ryzhov as Gavrila
- Evgeniy Teterin as Khariton
- Leonid Kmit as Stepan
- Varvara Myasnikova as Lyubimovna
- Aleksandra Denisova as Housekeeper
- Aleksandra Fyodorova as Ustinya
