= Varvara Myasnikova =

Soviet actress of theater and cinema (1900–1975)

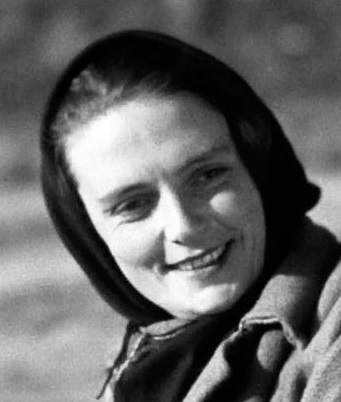
- Born: Varvara Sergeyevna Myasnikova; September 22, 1900; Saint Petersburg, Russian Empire
- Died: April 22, 1978 (aged 77); Moscow, Soviet Union
- Occupation: actress
- Spouse: Sergei Vasilyev

Varvara Sergeyevna Myasnikova (Russian: Варва́ра Серге́евна Мяснико́ва; October 5 [O.S. September 22] 1900 – April 22, 1978) was a Soviet actress.

== Life ==
Myasnikova was born in Saint Petersburg in 1900, the daughter of an insurance agent and a housewife. She had a sister and brother. She started working at Narkompros in 1918, where she also started in a theater group, then joining an experimental theater company within Narkompros. In 1925, the group ended up due to lack of funding, but the actors were hired by the Tovstonogov Bolshoi Drama Theater.

Her film career began in silent cinema in 1928, with the film The Parisian Cobbler (Парижский сапожник). In 1931, she was hired by the state-funded film production unit Lenfilm. In 1929, she acted in Fragment of an Empire (Обломок империи). In 1930, she acted in The Sleeping Beauty (Спящая красавица), which was written and directed by filmmaking duo Georgi and Sergei Vasilyev. In 1934, she acted in another of the Vailyevs' films, Chapayev (Чапаев), playing the role of Anka, a machine gun operator; her performance would inspire girls from the Soviet Union to volunteer in the Red Army, like Nina Onilova. Incidentally, she married Sergei Vasilyev that same year.

The couple had a daughter, named Varvara after her mother. In the same year, she was awarded the title of Emeritus Artist of the Soviet Union for her role in Chapayev, at the Moscow International Film Festival.

With the outbreak of World War II, the Lenfilm team was evacuated to Almaty, Kazakhstan. Myasnikova, her daughter and husband left Leningrad. Her mother and brother, Alekei, died in the Nazi siege of the city in 1942.

In 1947, Myasnikova played the Fairy Godmother in the feature Cinderella (Золушка), by Nadezhda Kocheverova and Mikhail Chapiro, but her participation is very limited in the production. Her marriage to Sergei Vasilyev ended in divorce in 1955 and Myasnikova moved to Moscow with her daughter. There she was hired by Mosfilm and started working in the national theater. In 1959, she played in Vladimir Kaplunovski's The Captain's Daughter and in the adaptation of Ivan Turgenev's novel, Mumu, by Yevgeny Teterin (1959).

== Death ==
Myasnikova died in Moscow on April 22, 1978, at the age of 74; her body was buried in the Serafimovskoe Cemetery in St. Petersburg, next to her mother and brother.

== Filmography ==
- The Parisian Cobbler (Парижский сапожник) (1928)
- Fragment of an Empire (Обломок империи) (1929)
- The Sleeping Beauty (Спящая красавица) (1930)
- Chapayev (Чапаев) (1934)
- The Defense of Tsaritsyn (Оборона Царицына) (1942)
- Cinderella (Золушка) (1947)
- The Captain's Daughter (Капитанская дочка) (1958)
- Mumu (Муму) (1959)
