= Crown Prince of the Republic =

- Russian: Наследный принц Республики
- Directed by: Eduard Ioganson
- Written by: Boris Chirskov; Eduard Ioganson; Rafail Muzykant
- Starring: Pyotr Kirillov; Yevgeniya Pyryalova; Andrei Apsolon; Georgiy Zhzhonov; Georgi Orlov
- Cinematography: Georgi Filatov
- Release date: 1934
- Country: Soviet Union

Crown Prince of the Republic (Russian: Наследный принц Республики) is a 1934 Soviet silent comedy film directed by Eduard Ioganson.

The film tells about a happy-go-lucky couple, Natasha and Sergey. The wife becomes pregnant and happily announces this to her husband, but it upsets him and their life completely changes.

== Plot ==
The film tells the story of a couple living an easy and carefree life. When the wife, Natasha, becomes pregnant and joyfully announces it to her husband, Sergey, his reaction is one of upset, leading to a dramatic shift in their lives. Sergey leaves Natasha and moves in with a group of young architects who occupy one of the rooms in a large house.

Due to a series of unforeseen events, Sergey discovers that the baby found by one of the housemates is his own newborn son. His friends do everything they can to find the missing mother, but Sergey keeps his paternity a secret and tries to place the child in someone else's care.

With the caring involvement of many people, the grief-stricken Natasha eventually finds her lost baby, who is named by the kind-hearted doctor as the hereditary prince of the Republic.

== Cast ==
- Pyotr Kirillov as The Husband
- Yevgeniya Pyryalova as The Wife
- Andrei Apsolon as Andrei, an architect
- Georgiy Zhzhonov as Bachelor-architect
- Georgi Orlov as Bachelor-architect
- Sergei Ponachevny as Bachelor-architect
- Nikolai Urvantsev as The old man
- K. Yegorov as The baby
- Nikolay Cherkasov as Waitor
- Yuri Muzykant as Passenger in the tram
- Mikhail Rostovtsev as Professor
