= The Defense of Volotchayevsk =

1937 Soviet film

- Russian: Волочаевские дни
- Directed by: Vasilyev brothers
- Written by: Vasilyev brothers
- Starring: Varvara Myasnikova; Lev Sverdlin; Yuri Lavrov; Boris Chirkov
- Cinematography: Aleksandr Sigayev
- Music by: Dmitri Shostakovich
- Release date: 1937
- Country: Soviet Union
- Language: Russian

The Defense of Volotchayevsk (Russian: Волочаевские дни) is a 1937 Soviet history war film directed and written by the Vasilyev brothers.

The Japanese squadron arrives at the raid of Vladivostok. The Japanese command landed troops in the Far East to allegedly protect their citizens.

== Plot ==
In 1918, a Imperial Japanese Navy squadron appears off the coast of Vladivostok. On the flagship, Colonel Ushijima (played by Lev Sverdlin), the leader of the Japanese expeditionary corps, converses with an American journalist. The colonel claims his hobby is botany and that he has come to Siberia to collect forget-me-nots found only in the Suchan District (now Partizansky District, Primorsky Krai). In reality, the Japanese seek an excuse for intervention.

The task of orchestrating a provocation is assigned to White Army lieutenant Grishin, who murders a Japanese watchmaker. This act serves as a pretext for the Japanese to land troops in Vladivostok, eventually moving toward the region of Volochaevka near Khabarovsk.

== Cast ==
- Varvara Myasnikova as Masha
- Nikolai Dorokhin as Andrei
- Lev Sverdlin as Col. Ushujima
- Yuri Lavrov as White Guard Officer
- Boris Chirkov as Old Man
- Boris Blinov as Bublik
- Vladimir Lukin as Egor
- Andrei Apsolon
- Pavel Volkov
- Valeri Solovtsov
- Sergey Filippov
