= Chapayev and Void =

1996 novel by Victor Pelevin

Chapayev and Pustota
- Buddha's Little Finger US version title
- Author: Victor Pelevin
- Original title: Чапаев и Пустота
- Language: Russian
- Genre: Psychological novel, Satire
- Publication date: 1996
- Publication place: Russia
- Media type: Print (Hardcover & Paperback)

Chapayev and Pustota (Russian: Чапаев и Пустота), known in the US as Buddha's Little Finger and in the UK as Clay Machine Gun, is a 1996 novel by Victor Pelevin. It follows the dreams of three Moscow mental patients in the early 1990s, with the main protagonist imagining flashbacks to the Russian Civil War, in which he was enlisted by a legendary Bolshevik commander.

Buddha's Little Finger has been compared to the works of Nikolai Gogol and Mikhail Bulgakov; it contains many satirical vignettes, and blurs the line between dream and reality. A film adaption, Buddha's Little Finger by Tony Pemberton, was released in 2015.

== Plot summary ==
The novel is written as a first-person narrative of Peter Pustota (whose surname literally means "void") and in the introduction to this book it is claimed that unlike Dmitriy Furmanov's book Chapayev, this book is the truth.

The book is set in two different times – after the October Revolution and in modern Russia. In the post-revolutionary period, Peter Pustota is a poet who has fled from Saint Petersburg to Moscow and who takes up the identity of a Soviet political commissar and meets a strange man named Vasily Chapayev (loosely based on the real Vasily Chapayev) who is some sort of an army commander. He spends his days drinking samogon, taking drugs and talking about the meaning of life with Chapayev.

Every night (according to his post-revolutionary life) Pustota has nightmares about him being locked up in a psychiatric hospital because of his beliefs of being a poet from the beginning of the century. He shares the room in the hospital with three other men, each with his very individual form of fake identity.

Until the end of the book it isn't clear which of Peter's identities is the real one and whether there is such a thing as a real identity at all.

== Characters ==
=== Revolutionary period ===
==== Peter ====
Peter is an unpolitical monarchist poet who is fleeing from the authorities. After murdering his former schoolmate chekist commander von Ernen he takes up von Ernen's checkist name Fanerny. Apartment he meets Chapayev and after a revolutionary performance which Peter does in a cabaret as Fanerny he is approached by Chapayev. Chapayev tells him that Peter (or Fanerny) is transferred to the Asian Cavalry division which is commanded by Chapayev. Everything that happens to him after boarding a train with Chapayev and his niece Anna is lost from Peter's memory after an injury he suffers in battle. Later he learns from other characters that he had become really close with Chapayev and had found answers to many questions. Peter falls in love with Anna who doesn't seem to find him attractive or interesting. He spends much time talking to Chapayev who is trying to explain the illusionary nature of the world to Peter. Peter's character is based on Pyotr Semenovich Isayev who was Chapayev's assistant in real life.

=== Modern Russia ===
==== Peter ====
In modern Russia Peter wakes up in a psychiatric hospital and has only Peter's memories from the times of the revolution. From his case in the hospital he learns to know that he has had psychological pathologies since the age of fourteen.

==== Serdyuk ====
Semen Serdyuk is an inmate of the 17th psychiatric hospital who shares the room with Peter. He claims that he has been put in the hospital after a misunderstanding he had with some policeman over the illusionarity of the world while lying drunk in some basement. When he is put in a state similar to hypnosis he tells a different story – about himself applying for work in a Japanese firm and performing seppuku when the company that has hired him becomes a subject of a hostile takeover by an archrival company.

==== Volodin ====
Vladimir Volodin is a Russian gangster (so-called "New Russian") and Peter's fellow inmate. He and his two friends (or rather "business partners") had consumed numerous psychedelic mushrooms, which took them to a Valhalla-like place ruled by Baron Sternberg.

==== Maria ====
Maria or Simply Maria (a male character) is another roommate of Peter's in the psychiatric hospital. After a head injury he has partly taken up the identity of "Simply Maria" – a character played by Victoria Ruffo in the soap opera Simplemente María which was very popular in Russia in the 1990s. In his hallucinations he is a manly woman who meets Arnold Schwarzenegger and after flying together with him on a military airplane through Moscow Maria is hit by the Ostankino Tower. His fantasies are full of phallic symbols. The flying scene has references to the films True Lies and Terminator in which Schwarzenegger stars.

== Themes ==
Julia Vaingurt opposed the idea of multiple critics that the novel advocates solipsism. She wrote that "while the protagonist’s search for authentic being and self-definition leads him to disregard the meaning others impose on his life, the novel recognizes the ethical problem of reducing the reality of others.

=== Buddhist motifs in the novel ===
The novel "Chapaev and Void" absorbed the entire cultural layer of Buddhist religion. The work is built on the philosophy of Zen Buddhism, according to which "active penetration into the nature of things means discovering a new world, and at the intuitive level. And this is facilitated by the koans (reasoning) that Pelevin uses in his texts as dialogues between the characters.

In the novel the commander Vasily Ivanovich Chapayev appears as a Zen Buddhist Guru, a guru who instructs his pupil, Peter, opening for him the way to Nirvana. Emptiness (Sanskrit "shunyata") is one of the basic concepts of Buddhism.

Chapaev's armored car, in which Peter makes his escape into emptiness, has slits resembling "half-closed Buddha eyes" for a reason. And the escape itself "is nothing more than a variation on the theme of the Buddhist "liberation" from the world of suffering. Only by abandoning one's "illusory" self and belief in the reality of the world around us through "enlightenment" as "awareness of the absence of thought" can one achieve a "buddha state," i.e., nirvana.

Nirvana is nothing and nowhere. Chapaev acts as a bodhisattva Guru for Peter, rejoicing when he answers the question "Who are you?" with "I don't know," and when asked "Where are we?" – "Nowhere." Awareness of oneself and the world as the Void is the last stage on the path to Nirvana, there is Nirvana itself, which cannot be described.

== Reception ==
According to Julia Vaingurt in 2018, many critics initially "accused the novel of advocating solipsism and radical disengagement."

A reviewer for Publishers Weekly was highly positive, writing that the work "will surely cement the reputation of Pelevin [...] as one of contemporary Russia's leading writers." The reviewer argued that while the novel risks becoming a mess, the "loosely applied Buddhist principles" ultimately make it cohesive. In The New York Times, Scott Bradfield argued that the satire is sometimes overkill, but claimed to admire the "genuine concern for the people who get lost in today's ideological battlefield". Bradfield wrote that "Pelevin has a gift for making complicated philosophical arguments feel both urgent and humane, and his translator, Andrew Bromfield, makes sure even the knottiest passages come through loud and clear."

By 2000, The Observer had listed Buddha's Little Finger among Pelevin's "acclaimed" novels. In 2000, a writer for Kirkus Reviews wrote that it is messier and more "self-indulgent" than other works by Pelevin, but is still quite compelling. The reviewer dismissed the satire on Western values as "clumsily transparent", but praised Pelevin's re-creation of Russia's early 20th-century literary culture. On Salon.com, Craig Offman said that the work is "[a]s astounding as it is frustrating [...] shabby, messy, but often visionary". He said the vignettes are "alternately biting and toothless", dismissing Maria's vision of the airplane piloted by Arnold Schwarzenegger while praising Serdyuk's vision of seppuku with a Japanese businessman. Offman dismissed certain Buddhism-inspired passages, but praised Pelevin as skilled in description and metaphor.

In 2017, scholar Sofya Khagi wrote that the novel is a "now-classic" work.
