= Mutiny (1928 film) =

- Russian: Мятеж
- Directed by: Semyon Tymoshenko
- Written by: Mikhail Bleiman; Semyon Tymoshenko
- Starring: Pyotr Podvalny; Aleksey Alekseev; Tatyana Guretskaya; Boris Babochkin; Pyotr Kirillov
- Cinematography: Leonid Patlis
- Production company: Sovkino
- Release date: 1928
- Running time: 87 min.
- Country: Soviet Union
- Language: Russian

Mutiny (Russian: Мятеж, romanized: Myatezh) is a 1928 Soviet war drama film directed by Semyon Tymoshenko based on the novel of the same name by Dmitry Furmanov.

== Plot ==
Set in 1920 during the Civil War in Central Asia, the film depicts the struggles of the Jarkent Battalion of the Red Army, stationed in Verny (modern-day Alma-Ata). The battalion receives orders from Frunze to march to the Fergana region to combat the Basmachi. However, a group of kulaks, with the support of local merchants and beys, manipulates the battalion’s discontent and incites a revolt. Exploiting war weariness and demagogically stirring anti-Soviet sentiment, the counter-revolutionaries provoke an open mutiny within the ranks.

The rebels seize the Vernensky Fortress, putting the city in peril, as reinforcements from Tashkent are at least two weeks away. In response, Dmitry Furmanov, acting as an envoy of the Revolutionary Military Council, arrives with a group of communists to address the situation. However, the mutineers arrest Furmanov and his comrades, sentencing them to execution. Just before the execution can take place, students from a nearby party school intervene, rescuing the captives and disrupting the mutiny.

Furmanov then seeks additional support from a cavalry regiment. At exactly 10 a.m., as per Frunze’s directive, the reorganized and battle-ready battalion departs to fulfill its mission against the Basmachi, restoring order and ensuring the continuation of the Red Army’s operations in the region.

== Cast ==
- Pyotr Podvalny as Mikhail Frunze
- Aleksey Alekseev as Dmitry Furmanov
- Tatyana Guretskaya as Naya Furmanova
- Boris Babochkin as Karavaev
- Pyotr Kirillov as partisan Eryskin
- Valery Solovtsov as Vinchetsky
- Nikolay Zimenko as Shegabutdinov

== Critical response ==
Film critic Mikhail Bleiman observed:

Working with a benevolent viewer in mind does not educate him, but only excites him for a second. This primitive method was used to make Mutiny. It is made with the expectation of constant reaction, guaranteed applause. That is why the film did not like the filmmakers who watched the work, and liked the Red Army men who watched the events for the first time.
