= Pyotr Kirillov =

Soviet actor, film director, and screenwriter

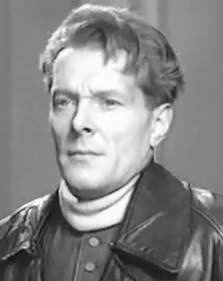
- Born: Pyotr Kirillov; May 17, 1895; Saint-Petersburg, Russian Empire
- Died: January 14, 1942 (aged 46); Leningrad, USSR
- Occupations: actor, film director
- Years active: 1922–1942

Pyotr Klavdievich Kirillov (Russian: Пётр Клавдиевич Кириллов) (17 May 1895 – 14 January 1942) was a Soviet actor, film director, screenwriter.

He died on January 14, 1942, during the Siege of Leningrad.

== Selected filmography ==
- 1928 — Mutiny as partisan Eryskin
- 1934 — Crown Prince of the Republic as Nikolai
- 1936 — The Sailors of Kronstadt as Valentin
- 1938 — The Great Citizen as Bryantsev
- 1941 — Tanker "Derbent" as Bredis
