= Actress (1943 film) =

1943 Soviet comedy film

- Russian: Актриса
- Directed by: Leonid Trauberg
- Written by: Nikolay Erdman; Mikhail Volpin
- Starring: Galina Sergeyeva; Boris Babochkin; Zinaida Morskaya; Vladimir Gribkov; Mikhail Zharov; Yuriy Korshun; Konstantin Sorokin
- Cinematography: Andrei Moskvin
- Music by: Oskar Sandler
- Release date: 1943
- Country: Soviet Union

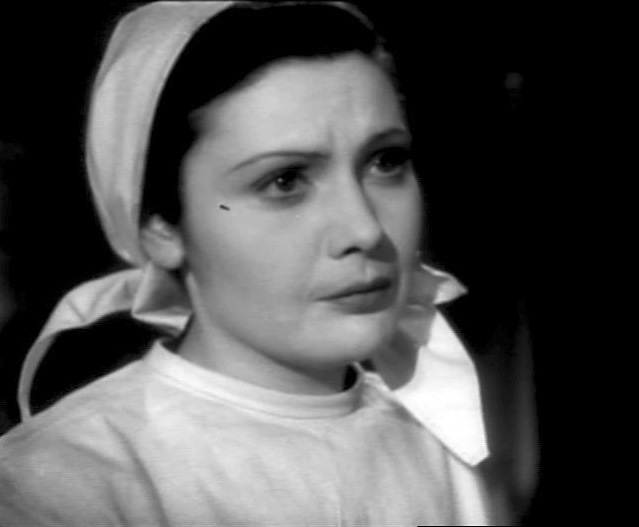
Galina Sergeeva in Actress

Actress, (Russian: Актриса) is a 1943 Soviet war romantic comedy film directed by Leonid Trauberg.

The film tells about the famous actress of the operetta, who decides to leave the profession in the midst of the war, as she thinks that nobody needs anyone else, but she returns to the scene, realizing that the military at the front, in the rear and in hospitals want to hear music.

== Plot ==
Zoya Vladimirovna Strelnikova, a renowned operetta actress, is evacuated to the rear along with the Operetta Theater during the war. She is provided a room in the home of the stern Agafya Lukinichna, whose son, a battalion commander major, is fighting on the front lines. Agafya strongly believes there should be no room for frivolity during wartime and disapproves of Strelnikova's cheerful demeanor.

Under the pressure of Agafya’s constant criticism, Strelnikova resigns from the theater and takes a job as a nursemaid in a military hospital. There, she meets Major Pyotr Nikolayevich Markov, who is recovering from an eye injury. Unbeknownst to her, Markov is Agafya’s son. As they grow closer, Markov confides his deep love for operetta and reveals he once had a crush on a lead actress. Strelnikova begins to develop feelings for him. One day, Markov asks her to play a record he keeps in his bedside table—a recording of Strelnikova herself. When the record accidentally breaks, Strelnikova sings the song live to avoid disappointing him, revealing her true identity as the famous actress.

After his recovery, Markov returns to the front. Inspired, Strelnikova joins the war effort, performing concerts for soldiers on the front lines.

== Cast ==
- Galina Sergeyeva as Zoya Vladimirovna Strelnikova
- Boris Babochkin as Pyotr Nikolaevich Markov (as B. Babochkin)
- Zinaida Morskaya as Agafya Lukinichna (as M. Morskaya)
- Vladimir Gribkov as Anatoliy Sergeevich Obolenskiy (as V. Gribkov)
- Mikhail Zharov as Reciter in hospital (as M. Zharov)
- Yuriy Korshun as Vasya Ivanov, Wounded soldier in hospital (as Yu. Korshun)
- Konstantin Sorokin as Zaytsev (as K. Sorokin)
- Nikolay Temyakov as Zinoviy Aleksandrovich, Theater manager (as N. Temyakov)
- Vladimir Shishkin as Shurik (as V. Shishkin)
