= Lev Barashkov =

Background information
- Born: Lev Pavlovich Barashkov; December 4, 1931; Moscow, USSR
- Died: February 23, 2011 (aged 79) Moscow, Russia
- Occupations: singer, actor
- Label: Melodiya

Lev Pavlovich Barashkov (Russian: Лев Павлович Барашков; December 4, 1931 — February 23, 2011) was a Soviet actor of theater and cinema, pop singer. Honored Artist of the RSFSR (1970). Honored Artist of the Karakalpak Autonomous Soviet Socialist Republic.

== Biography ==
Born December 4, 1931 in Moscow in the family of a military pilot Pavel Nikolayevich (1905–1965) and a worker of aircraft repair workshops Anastasia Yakovlevna (1906–2004) Barashkov's. Children's years of Lyova were held in the Moscow region of Lyubertsy, where the military unit of his father was stationed. Like all friends, he dreamed of becoming a pilot and fighting in the sky with enemies. During the war, the boy fled the house and, calling himself an orphan, tried to become the son of a regiment. But in the village near Podolsk, where he was already driven by his height, the fugitive identified his father's colleague and sent him back. While studying at the Kaluga Pedagogical Institute, I studied in a drama club under the leadership of Zinovy Korogodsky. I played volleyball and football.

After the appointment of Korogodsky as the chief stage director of the Kaliningrad Regional Drama Theater, the year appeared on the professional stage.

In 1956 he entered the GITIS (course of Andrey Goncharov). After graduation, he was invited to Moscow Pushkin Drama Theatre. In the mid 1960s he left the theater and became the soloist of Igor Granov's ensemble Blue Guitars, from 1966 to 1976 he worked in the Moscow Concert.

Alexandra Pakhmutova's song The Main Thing, Guys, Do Not Get Old With a Heart, on the verses of Nikolai Dobronravov and Sergei Grebennikov became the singer's card. It is noteworthy that he was the first performer of this song.

In the period from 1959 to 1974 he played several roles in films, recorded songs for the films Silence and The Elusive Avengers.

He was married to actress and ballerina Lyudmila Barashkova (Butenina). They had a daughter, Anastasia.

Died on February 23, 2011. He was buried at Vagankovskoye Cemetery (23 plot).
