= Chapayevka (river) =

Location
- Country: Russia

Physical characteristics
- Source
  - location: Siny Syrt, Samara Oblast, Russia
- Mouth: Volga
  - location: Saratov Reservoir
  - coordinates: 53.0433°N 49.5525°E
- Length: 298 km (185 mi)
- Basin size: 4,310 km^{2} (1,660 sq mi)
- Discharge
  - average: 2.53 m^{3}/s (89 cu ft/s)

Basin features
- Progression: Volga→ Caspian Sea

The Chapayevka (Russian: Чапа́евка) is a river in Samara Oblast, Russia, a left tributary of the Volga. It origins at the slope of Siny Syrt and flows to the Saratov Reservoir, near Novokuybyshevsk, Samara agglomeration. It is 298 km long and its drainage basin is 4,310 km^{2}. The town of Chapayevsk lies along the river. The river is navigable for 34 km, from its mouth to Chapayevsk. The river has snow feeding and dries up in the upper stream. Since November till April it is used to be frozen. Major inflows are Petrushka, Vetlyanka, Vyazovka.

The river originally was named Mocha. In 1925 it was renamed Chapayevka in honor of the Russian Civil War Red Army combatant Vasily Chapayev.

== Paleontology ==
Fossil remains of Triassic tetrapods are known in the river basin. The first location of fossils was discovered in 1951 opposite the village of Goryainovka, on the right bank of the Chapayevka. Bones of unidentified labyrinthodonts were found in conglomerate outcrops. In subsequent decades, other fossil sites were discovered in this region.

In the summer of 2020, in the ravine, which flows into Chapayevka 0.8 km northeast of Orekhovka village, another location of Early Triassic fossils was discovered, composed of clays, bone-bearing sandstones and conglomerates. Early Olenekian temnospondyls are known from this locality. Occipital parts of the skulls and the right part of the lower jaw of Benthosuchus sushkini, the right part of the lower jaw of Thoosuchus sp. and fragments of jaws and ribs of unidentified amphibians were collected from these deposits.
