= October Days (film) =

1958 film by Sergei Vasilyev

- Russian: В дни октября
- Directed by: Sergei Vasilyev
- Written by: Sergei Vasilyev; Nikolai Otten
- Starring: Vladimir Chestnokov; V. Brener; Leonid Lyubashevsky; Adolf Shestakov; Andro Kobaladze
- Cinematography: Apollinari Dudko
- Edited by: Valentina Mironova
- Music by: Boris Chaikovsky
- Release date: 1958
- Running time: 103 minute
- Country: Soviet Union
- Language: Russian

October Days (Russian: В дни октября) is a 1958 Soviet biographical drama film directed by Sergei Vasilyev.

== Plot ==
In the autumn of 1917, Vladimir Lenin returns to Petrograd in secrecy and hides in a safe house belonging to Fofanova. Meanwhile, on Nevsky Prospect, the bourgeoisie angrily denounce the "German spies," referencing accusations of Bolsheviks being funded by Germany. In the Mariinsky Palace, American journalist John Reed interviews leaders of the Pre-Parliament and the Provisional Government, including Lianozov, Alekseyev, Avksentiev, Gots, and Kerensky, who confidently proclaim their control over Russia. However, in the working-class districts, Red Guards and soldiers are already mobilizing to overthrow the Provisional Government.

The film presents, for the first time in Soviet cinema, the intense debates during the historic meeting of the Bolshevik Central Committee regarding the uprising. Key figures such as Trotsky (declaring, "My position aligns with Lenin’s; we must seize power"), Zinoviev, Kamenev, Uritsky, and a young Stalin are shown in their critical roles.

The climax depicts the October Armed Uprising, including the Storming of the Winter Palace and the Second All-Russian Congress of Soviets, where the establishment of Soviet power is officially proclaimed.

== Cast ==
- Vladimir Chestnokov as Lenin (as V. Chestnokov)
- V. Brener as Krupskaya
- Leonid Lyubashevsky as Sverdlov (as L. Lyubashevskiy)
- Adolf Shestakov as Dzerzhinsiky (as A. Shestakov)
- Andro Kobaladze as Stalin (as A. Kobaladze)
- David Volosov as Uritskiy (as D. Volosov)
- Nina Mamaeva as Margarita Fofanova (as N. Mamayeva)
- Konstantin Kalinis as Podvoyskiy (as K. Kalinis)
- Georgy Satini as Antonov- Ovseyenko (as G. Satini)
- German Khovanov as Yeremeyev (as G. Khovanov)
