= Heroic Deed Among the Ice =

1928 film by Georgi Vasilyev and Sergei Vasilyev

- Russian: Подвиг во льдах
- Directed by: Georgi Vasilyev; Sergei Vasilyev
- Release date: 1928
- Running time: 71 minutes
- Country: Soviet Union
- Language: Silent

Heroic Deed Among the Ice (Russian: Подвиг во льдах) is a 1928 Soviet silent documentary film. It is also known as Exploit on the Ice and Ice-Breaker Krassin. This film is the first collaboration between Georgi Vasilyev and Sergei Vasilyev.

== Subject ==
Heroic Deed Among the Ice details the mission of the ice-breaker Krasin to rescue the crashed crew of Umberto Nobile's arctic airship Italia. The raw material shot without any plan by cameramen who accompanied Krasin was used by Georgi and Sergei Vasilyev to create a coherent and powerful narrative in the tradition of Soviet montage school. Heroic Deed was released in October 1928 and its success helped Georgi and Sergei Vasilyev to realize their ambition to direct.

All the editing notes by Vasilyev survive and have been published, but the film itself is partially lost.
