= Dmitry Furmanov =

Russian writer (1891–1926)

- Дмитрий Фурманов
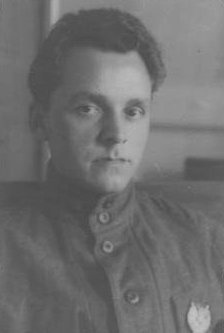
- Furmanov in 1941 (?)
- Born: 7 November [O.S. 26 October] 1891; Sereda-Upino, Kostroma Governorate, Russian Empire
- Died: 15 March 1926 (aged 34); Moscow, RSFSR, Soviet Union
- Burial place: Novodevichy Cemetery
- Education: Imperial Moscow University (1915)
- Occupations: Writer; revolutionary; military and political figure; editor
- Political party: CPSU (after 1918)
- Other political affiliations: Union of Socialists-Revolutionaries-Maximalists (before 1918)
- Spouse: Anna Steshenko

Dmitriy Andreyevich Furmanov (Russian: Дмитрий Андреевич Фурманов; 7 November [O.S. 26 October] 1891 – 15 March 1926) was a Russian revolutionary, military officer and writer. He gained the fame after his literary legacy with the novel Chapaev.

== Biography ==
=== Childhood and youth ===
He was born to a peasant family: Furmanov's father, Andrei Mikhailovich Furmanov, came from peasants of Yaroslavl Governorate; his mother, Evdokia Vasilyevna, was from a shoemaker's family in Vladimir. However, the extract from the metric book of the Ascension Church in the village of Sereda-Upino indicates that the father was "Andrey Semenovich Furmanov, discharged to the reserve of the army". In the exposition of the D. A. Furmanov Memorial Museum in the city of Furmanov, Ivanovo Oblast, a visiting card of the father is presented, which also indicates the name Andrey Semenovich. The same information is indicated by the cultural historian Sergey Borisov: "So, we're moving", — Andrey Semyonovich said quietly... Andrey Semyonovich Furmanov lived a hard life...".

For three years, he attended the Realschule in Kineshma. Although he lived in Kineshma for only about three years (1909–1912), they were important for shaping his worldview and character. It was at the real school that Dmitry Furmanov finally decided to dedicate his life to literature. After graduating in August 1912, he entered Imperial Moscow University at the philological faculty, which he graduated in 1915, but did not manage to pass the state exams. On his way to his place of service, he stopped in Pyatigorsk "to see the land of Lermontov".

=== During the October Revolution and Civil War ===
During World War I, he served with the Red Cross. There he met and married Anna Steshenko. In 1917, he joined the Union of Socialists-Revolutionaries Maximalists, then became an Anarchist. He fled Moscow following the Kornilov affair and settled in Ivanovo, where he provided support to the October Revolution.

From September 1917 — deputy chairman of the local Soviet, supported the October Revolution, and ordered the arrest of striking postal and telegraph employees. He was included in the military section of the local Soviet. In July 1918 he joined the RCP(b). At the head of a Red Guard detachment he participated in the suppression of the Yaroslavl uprising. At this time he became close to Mikhail Frunze, then chairman of the provincial committee of the RCP(b) and military commissar of Ivanovo-Voznesensk Governorate. In autumn 1918 he became secretary of the Ivanovo-Voznesensk district committee of the RCP(b). From September 1918, on Frunze's instructions (who had become commissar of the Yaroslavl Military District), he led propaganda among military units of the district.

In January 1919, when Frunze was appointed commander of the 4th Army of the Eastern Front, Furmanov also went as a political worker to the Eastern Front, where he became commissar of the Aleksandro-Gayskaya group of troops. From March 25 — commissar of the 25th Rifle Division (1st formation), commanded by Vasily Chapayev. On June 30, 1919, due to a conflict with Chapayev (arising from jealousy: Chapayev began an affair with Furmanov's wife Anna Steshenko) he was transferred from the division to Turkestan. From August 1919 to September 1920 — head of the political department of the Turkestan Front, simultaneously from late 1919 — authorized representative of the Revolutionary Military Council of the Republic in Semirechye. June 12–19, 1920 during the uprising in the Verny (Alma-Ata) garrison he played a key role in suppressing the uprising: Furmanov negotiated with the rebels, stalling for time until loyal units arrived (this episode is described in his novel Mutiny).

From August 1920 — on the Kuban, commissar of the landing detachment of E. I. Kovtyukh, urgently formed and sent to repel the Ulagay landing. In one of the battles he was severely concussed. Later for this operation he was awarded the Order of the Red Banner of the RSFSR. After the end of the battles he was appointed head of the political department of the IX Kuban Army. In spring 1921 he was chief editor of the newspaper Krasny Voin.

After his recovery, in 1921, he returned to Moscow, where he was employed by several organizations dealing with military publications and he completed his education at Moscow University. After 1923, he worked for Gosizdat, a publisher of propaganda. He also worked for the Moscow Association of Proletarian Writers.

=== Writing career ===
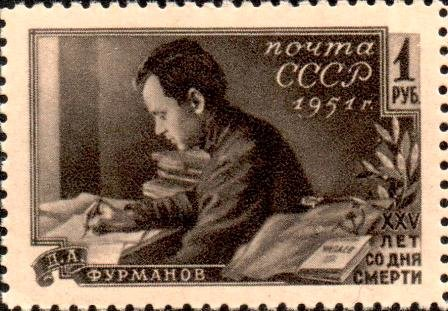
Furmanov at his desk and the book Chapaev. Soviet Union postage stamp, 1951

In June 1921 Furmanov arrived in Moscow, worked in the literary-publishing department of the Political Directorate of the Revvoensovet, member of the Higher Military Editorial Council; from November he headed the editorial office of the journal Voennaya Nauka i Revolyutsiya and at the same time completed his philological education at Moscow University (graduated 1924). In 1922 two portraits of him were created by artist Sergey Malyutin. From September 1923 — at Gosizdat; political editor, then editor of the department of modern fiction.

In 1924–1925 — secretary of the Moscow Association of Proletarian Writers (MAPP).

The novel Chapaev brought him the fame.

In 1934, based on this book, directors Vasilyev brothers made the film Chapaev, which gained enormous popularity in the USSR.

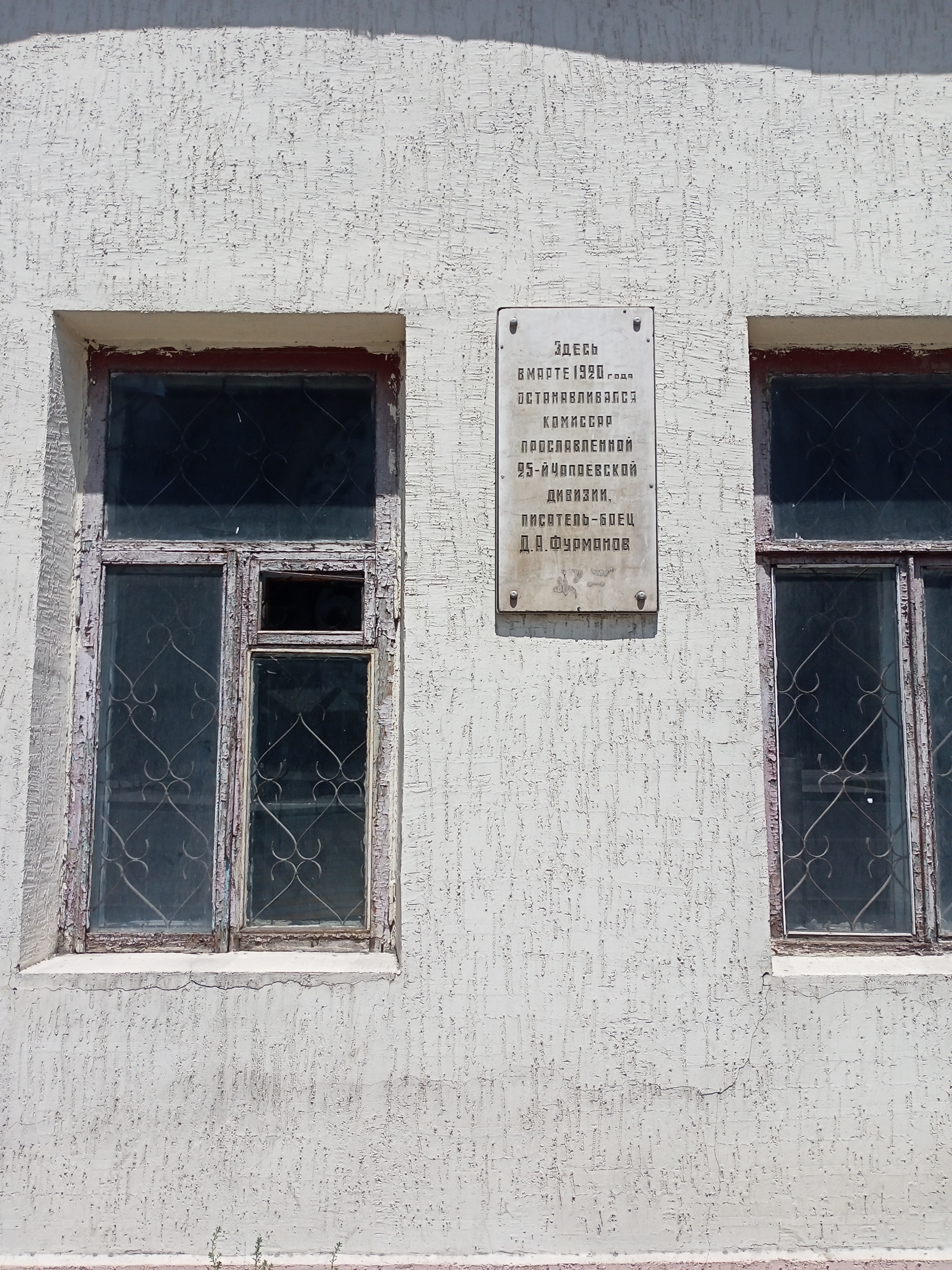
House where D. Furmanov stayed in Taraz

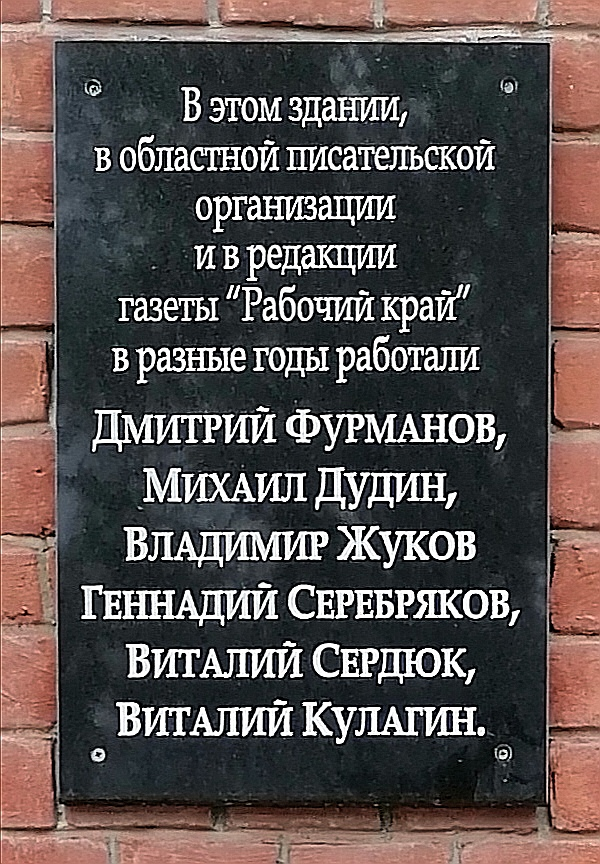
Memorial plaque in Ivanovo, Lenin Avenue, 16

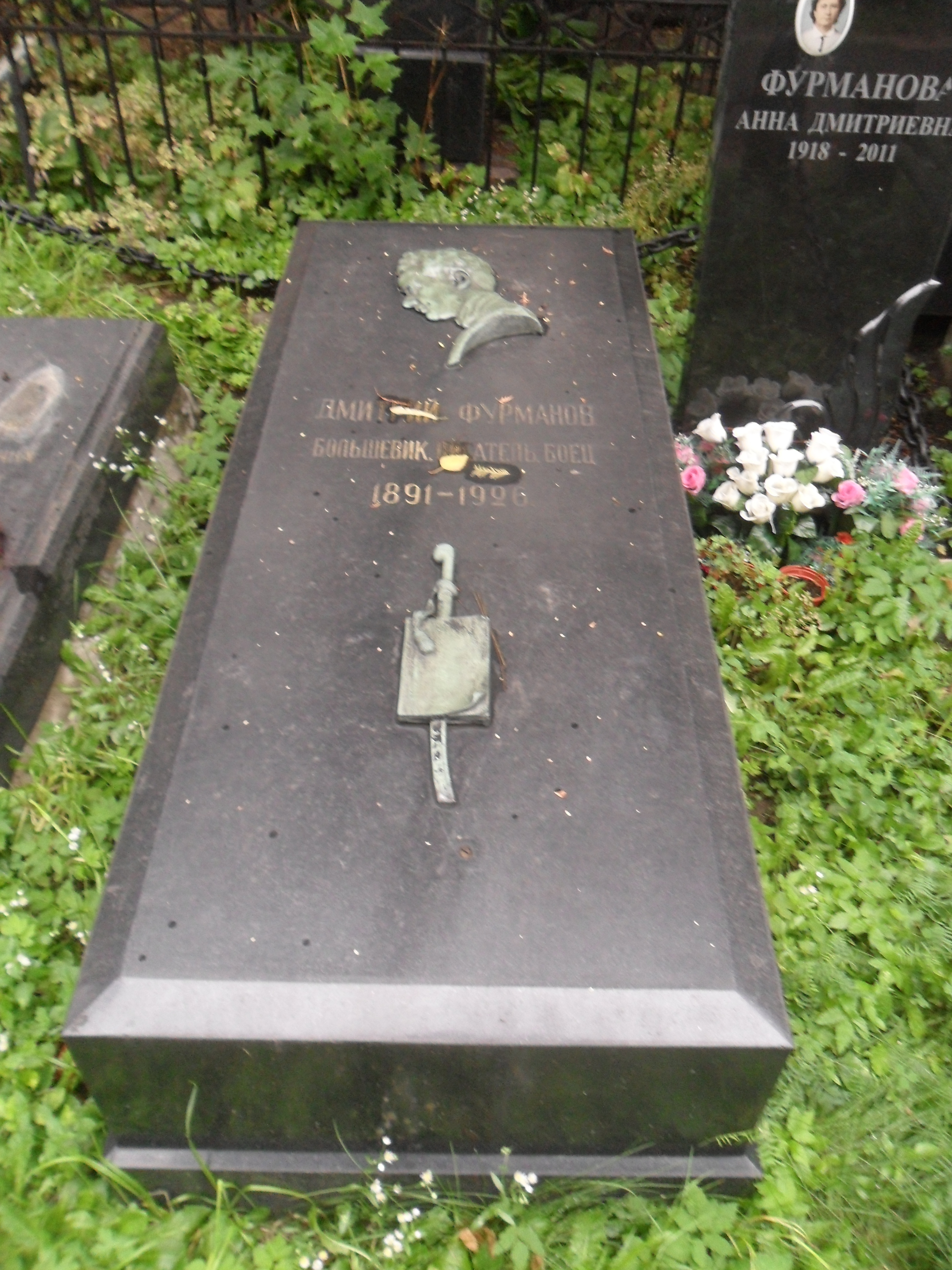
Grave of Dmitry Furmanov at Novodevichy Cemetery

=== Death ===
Furmanov died on March 15, 1926, of meningitis, and was buried at Novodevichy Cemetery (section No. 1, row 44, plot 38). Prominent Soviet military leader General Khlebnikov, a close friend and comrade-in-arms of Furmanov from the Chapayev division, recalled the circumstances of his illness and death:

Our listeners asked Dmitry Andreyevich to write about Frunze the way he wrote about Chapayev. He replied that he himself was thinking about it. Indeed, Furmanov even drew up a plan for the future book, but did not have time to do more. He fell ill with angina, which he considered a trivial disease, but he did not know how to take care of himself. With a high fever he continued to speak at writers' meetings, demanding the implementation of the Central Committee decisions on literature, calling for the cleansing of the writers' ranks from double-dealers, intriguers and squabblers. Angina caused blood poisoning. On March 15, 1926, they called me at work and asked me to come urgently to the Furmanovs — Dmitry Andreyevich had become very ill. At Furmanov's bedside I found several of his closest friends. Among them was sister of Vladimir Ilyich Lenin — Anna Ilyinichna Ulyanova-Yelizarova. Dmitry was delirious. A few hours later he passed away. "A golden man has died," Anna Ilyinichna said with deep pain. That's how it happens in life: a young, vigorous man who passed through forty deaths unharmed, perished from an illness he initially paid no attention to.

== Family ==
- Wife — Anna Nikitichna Furmanova
  - Daughter — Anna Dmitrievna Furmanova (January 7, 1918 – March 16, 2011), participant in the Great Patriotic War, Honorary Citizen of the city of Furmanov.

== Legacy ==
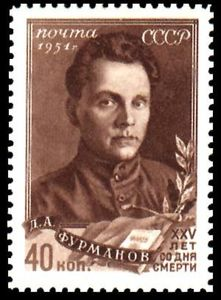
Dmitry Furmanov. Soviet Union postage stamp, 1951

- In 1941 the town of Sereda (Ivanovo Oblast), where the writer D. A. Furmanov was born, was renamed Furmanov.
- In his native town a Memorial Museum of D. A. Furmanov was founded on October 26, 1958 (reopened October 26, 2005).
- A monument to the writer Dmitry Furmanov was erected in Furmanov.
- The Ivanovo Pedagogical College is named after D. A. Furmanov.
- Furmanov Street (Klin)
- In Kineshma the general education lyceum (former school No. 4, pre-revolution real school) bears the name of D. A. Furmanov.
- In Moscow there are Central Library No. 66 and Children's Library No. 32 named after D. A. Furmanov (Begovaya Street, 13 and 1st Botkinsky Proyezd, 4 building 1 respectively).
- In Kazakhstan in the city of Taraz there is a memorial plaque on the house where D. A. Furmanov lived for some time in the 1920s.
- In Kazakhstan in Kostanay Region, Arkalyk district, there is a village named Furmanovo.
- From 1961 to 1973 the Ivanovo Pedagogical Institute (now Ivanovo State University) bore the name of D. A. Furmanov.
- In Almaty there was a bust of D. A. Furmanov in the square behind the Sary-Arka cinema (previously on the former Furmanov Street, corner with Kurmangazy St.).
- In Almaty in the "Severny" square below KBTU on the Alley of Outstanding Figures a bust on a pedestal is installed.
- A comfortable four-deck river cruise ship Project 302 (type Dmitry Furmanov) is named after him.
- Shuya State Pedagogical Institute named after D. A. Furmanov (Ivanovo Oblast).
- Two villages in Marxovsky District, Saratov Oblast (Furmanovo and Furmanovka) are named after Furmanov.
- Streets named after Furmanov exist in many cities of the former USSR, including Barnaul, Yekaterinburg, Degtyarsk, Ivanovo, Izhevsk, Irkutsk, Kazan, Krasnodar, Krasnoyarsk, Lipetsk, Makhachkala, Murmansk, Novosibirsk, Petrozavodsk, Rybinsk, Ryazan, Salavat, Sarapul, Saransk, Slavyansk-na-Kubani, Sterlitamak, Tomsk, Usolye-Sibirskoye, Ufa, Cheboksary, Cheremkhovo, Khabarovsk, Yaroslavl. Previously there was a street in Moscow — Nashchokinsky Lane (not to be confused with Furmanny Lane) and in Saint Petersburg — Gagarinskaya Street. In Almaty (Kazakhstan) Nazarbayev Avenue was formerly Furmanov Street.
- In Oryol there is Furmanov Passage (named November 21, 1949).
- Mount Furmanova on Sakhalin Island is named after D. A. Furmanov.
- Cape Furmanova (Kara Sea, Severnaya Zemlya, October Revolution Island; name assigned in 1953).

== In film ==
- Aleksey Alekseyev — Mutiny (1928)
- Boris Blinov — Chapaev (1934)
- Yury Bogatyryov — Mutiny (1980)
- Lev Prygunov — Fiery Roads (1984)
- Aleksandr Rapoport — Kill the Thrush (2013)
- Yury Baturin — Passions for Chapay (2013)
- Exel Sichrovsky — Buddha's Little Finger (2015)

== Awards ==
- Order of the Red Banner (March 22, 1922) — "for directly participating in combat operations of the expeditionary detachment, by his personal example inspiring the command staff and Red Army men, thereby contributing to the success of the liquidation of Wrangel's landing on the Kuban".

== See also ==
- Portrait of D. A. Furmanov
- Chapayev and Void (novel)
