= The Aerial Cabman =

- Russian: Воздушный извозчик
- Directed by: Gerbert Rappaport
- Written by: Yevgeni Petrov
- Starring: Mikhail Zharov; Lyudmila Tselikovskaya; Boris Blinov; Grigoriy Shpigel; Vladimir Gribkov
- Cinematography: Aleksandr Galperin
- Music by: Yuriy Biryukov
- Production companies: Kazakhfilm; Lenfilm
- Release date: 1943
- Running time: 74 min.
- Country: Soviet Union
- Language: Russian

The Aerial Cabman (Russian: Воздушный извозчик, romanized: Vozdushny izvozchik) is a 1943 Soviet musical comedy film directed by Gerbert Rappaport.

A lonely pilot Baranov falls in love with a high-profile singer Natasha Kulikova, whose parents are categorically against the engagement, but young people are convinced that they will be happy together. But the war divides them.

== Plot ==
The film is set in 1940 and follows Ivan Baranov, an aging pilot for Aeroflot, who captains a PS-84 aircraft. Baranov falls in love with Natasha Kulikova, a young aspiring opera singer, after meeting her during an emergency landing of his plane. However, Natasha's mother opposes their relationship, believing that her daughter would be better suited to marry Svetlovidov, a rising star in the opera world and a future laureate. Despite this opposition, Ivan and Natasha are certain of their love and their ability to build a happy life together. Their plans are interrupted by the outbreak of war, and Baranov requests a transfer to serve as a fighter pilot but is denied.

Frustrated, Baranov laments that his role remains that of a "sky taxi driver," while younger pilots take to the skies in combat. On the day of Natasha's debut at the Moscow Opera Theater, Baranov receives an urgent mission to fly behind enemy lines. His task is to deliver ammunition to Soviet forces and evacuate wounded soldiers. On his return flight, he engages in a dogfight with German planes, managing to shoot one down.

As Baranov attempts to return home, his plane becomes lost in dense fog, bringing him perilously close to Moscow. In his moment of distress, he hears Natasha's voice over the radio, guiding him to safety. Her voice becomes his beacon, saving his life and reuniting the two lovers despite the challenges of war.

== Starring ==
- Mikhail Zharov as Baranov
- Lyudmila Tselikovskaya as Natasha
- Boris Blinov as The Colonel
- Grigoriy Shpigel as Svellovidov
- Vladimir Gribkov as Kulikov
- Mikhail Kuznetsov as Co-pilot
- Tatyana Govorkova as Matilda Kulikova
- Konstantin Sorokin as Zadunajsky
- Vladimir Shishkin as Tolya
- Lyudmila Shabalina as Marusya
