= Boris Blinov =

Soviet actor

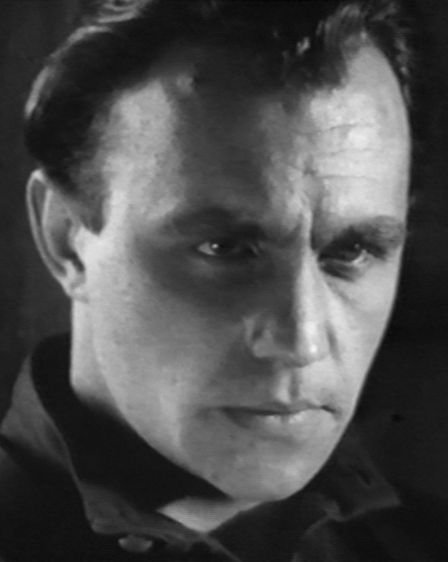
- Born: Boris Vladimirovich Blinov; 19 April 1909; Saint Petersburg, Russian Empire
- Died: 13 September 1943 (aged 34); Almaty, Kazakh SSR, Soviet Union
- Occupation: Actor
- Years active: 1929–1943

Boris Vladimirovich Blinov (19 April 1909 – 13 September 1943) was a Soviet and Russian stage and film actor. Honored Artist of the RSFSR (1935).

== Personal life ==
He was born in Saint Petersburg. In 1929, he became an actor in Bryantsev Youth Theatre.

During the filming of Wait for Me, he contracted typhoid fever. Nevertheless, he continued his work until the filming was done, dying two months before the film's premiere.

== Filmography ==
- Chapaev (1934) – Dmitry Furmanov
- Girl Friends (1935) – injured commissioner
- The Youth of Maxim (1935) – political prisoner (uncredited)
- The Defense of Volotchayevsk (1937) – sailor Bublik
- The Vyborg Side (1939) – Anatoli Zhelezniakov
- Member of the Government (1939) – district committee secretary
- Yakov Sverdlov (1940) – Anatoli Zhelezniakov (uncredited)
- The Girl from Leningrad (1941) – Andrei Morozov
- The Murderers are Coming (1942) – Theo
- The Front (1943) – guard sergeant Ostapenko
- The Aerial Cabman (1943) – colonel Sergeyev
- Wait for Me (1943) – Nikolai Yermolov (final film role)

== Bibliography ==
- Haynes, John. New Soviet Man: Gender and Masculinity in Stalinist Soviet Cinema. Manchester University Press, 2003.
