= The Sleeping Beauty (1930 film) =

1930 film

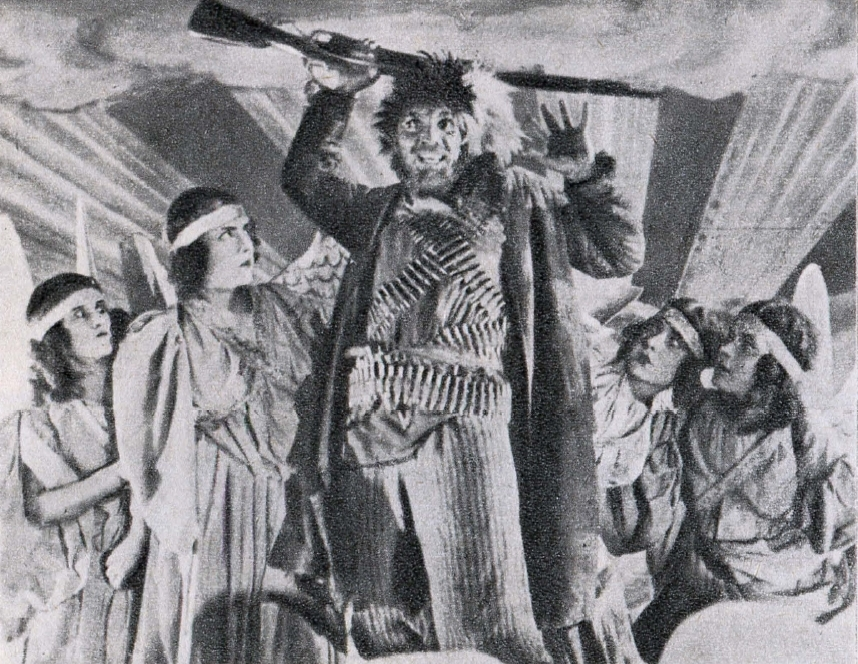
- A still of Nikolay Simonov
- Directed by: Georgi Vasilyev and Sergei Vasilyev
- Written by: Grigori Aleksandrov
- Starring: Konstantin Mukhutdinov; Varvara Myasnikova; Nikolay Simonov
- Cinematography: Yevgeni Shneider
- Production company: Lensoyuzkino
- Release date: 21 November 1930
- Running time: 76 minutes
- Country: Soviet Union
- Language: Russian

The Sleeping Beauty (Russian: Спящая красавица, romanized: Spyashchaya krasavitsa) is a 1930 Soviet drama film directed by Georgi Vasilyev and Sergei Vasilyev, their first feature film.

The main themes of the film are the conflict between old art forms such as ballet and the revolution and the need for creating new, proletarian forms of art.

== Plot ==
Set against the backdrop of the October Revolution and Russian Civil War, the story begins during a performance of The Sleeping Beauty at a theater, where Bolsheviks Rebrov and Georgy distribute revolutionary leaflets with the help of costumer Vera and a cleaner. The revolutionaries evade the police and escape.

During the Civil War, the same theater becomes the venue for a provincial Congress of Soviets chaired by Rebrov. When news arrives that White Army forces have breached the defenses, the attendees leave the theater to join the fight.

After the Whites seize the city, they stage an opera at the theater while simultaneously using it as a site for trials and executions of Bolsheviks. Georgy, captured and awaiting execution, is freed when a "green" partisan group storms the theater. He persuades the partisans to join the Reds but is killed by a bandit during the chaos. Vera, seizing his revolutionary leaflets, rallies the partisans to support the Red Army under Rebrov's leadership.

Years later, the theater hosts another Congress of Soviets. After the session, The Sleeping Beauty is performed again, but this time, young audience members protest, demanding revolutionary art that reflects their new era.

== Cast ==
- Konstantin Mukhutdinov as worker Rebrov
- Varvara Myasnikova as Vera
- Nikolay Simonov as worker
- Ivan Chuvelev
