= Vasilyev brothers =

Georgi Vasilyev (Russian: Георгий Николаевич Васильев, 1899–1946) and Sergei Vasilyev (Russian: Серге́й Дмитриевич Васильев, 1900–1959), usually credited as Vasilyev brothers (Russian: Братья Васильевы) were two Russian Soviet film directors and screenwriters. In spite of the fact that the two collaborators were not actually relatives, they accepted the popular misunderstanding that they were brothers and used it in the credits to their movies.

== Collaboration ==
The two Vasilyevs became acquainted in 1925 on cinema production facilities in Moscow. After the studio Goskino merged with the Moscow branch of Sevzapkino to form Sovkino (later known as Lenfilm), the Vasilyevs found themselves working in the same editing room, often working jointly on the same films.

The feature-length documentary "Heroic Deed Among the Ice" (premiered on October 23, 1928) was their first directing experience. In the credits of their next (and their first feature film), "The Sleeping Beauty", they called themselves the Vasilyev brothers for the first time. The 1934 film "Chapaev" brought the Vasilyev brothers countrywide fame and worldwide professional recognition. The film's premiere took place on November 5 in the Leningrad cinema theatre "Titan". The film instantly became one of the most popular in Soviet history; over 30 million people in the Soviet Union had seen it within a year of its release.

== Joint filmography ==
- 1928 — Подвиг во льдах (Heroic Deed Among the Ice) (feature-length documentary)
- 1930 — Спящая красавица (The Sleeping Beauty)
- 1932 — Личное дело (Тревожные гудки) (A Personal Affair (Alarming Siren))
- 1933 — Невероятно - но факт! (Incredible - But True!) (short documentary)
- 1934 — Чапаев (Chapaev)
- 1937 — Волочаевские дни (The Defense of Volotchayevsk aka Volochayev Days)
- 1942 — Оборона Царицына (Fortress on the Volga aka The Defense of Tsaritsyn), (dilogy)
- 1943 — Фронт (The Front)

== Sergei Vasilyev's filmography (after 1946) ==
- 1950 — Наши песни (Our Songs), (unfinished)
- 1954 — Герои Шипки (Heroes of Shipka)
- 1958 — В дни Октября (October Days), (part 1)

== See also ==
- Vasilyev Brothers State Prize of the RSFSR

== Bibliography ==
- In Russian: Братья Васильевы: Собрание сочинений в 3-х тт. - Москва: Искусство, 1983.
