= The Front (1943 film) =

- Russian: Фронт
- Directed by: Vasilyev brothers
- Written by: Aleksandr Korneychuk
- Starring: Boris Zhukovsky; Boris Babochkin; Pavel Geraga; Boris Dmokhovsky; Vasili Vanin
- Cinematography: Apollinari Dudko
- Music by: Gavriil Popov
- Release date: 1943
- Country: Soviet Union
- Language: Russian

The Front, (Russian: Фронт) is a 1943 Soviet World War II film directed by Vasilyev brothers.

== Plot ==
The film tells about the necessary change of generations in the leadership of the Red Army as a result of the beginning of the Great Patriotic War.

== Cast ==
- Boris Zhukovsky as Ivan Gorlov
- Boris Babochkin as Ognev
- Pavel Geraga as Kolos
- Boris Dmokhovsky as Blagonravov
- Vasili Vanin as Khripun
- Boris Chirkov as Udivitelnyy
- Lev Sverdlin as Gaidar
- Pavel Volkov as Miron Gorlov
- Nikolay Kryuchkov as Sergei Gorlov
- Boris Blinov as Ostapenko
- Zh. Oguzbaev as Shayakhmetov
- N. Kostov as Gomelauri
- A. Chepurnov as Bashlykov
- Anna Petukhova as Marusya (as A. Petukhova)
- Andrei Apsolon
- Vladimir Gremin
- Aleksandr Ilyinsky
- Yuriy Korshun
- Pyotr Sobolevsky
