= Chapaev (film) =

1934 Soviet war film

- Official film poster
- Directed by: Georgi Vasilyev; Sergei Vasilyev
- Based on: Чапаев by Dmitry Furmanov
- Starring: Boris Babochkin; Boris Blinov; Varvara Myasnikova; Leonid Kmit
- Music by: Gavriil Popov
- Production company: Lenfilm
- Release date: 1934
- Running time: 91 minutes
- Country: Soviet Union
- Language: Russian

Chapaev (Russian: Чапаев, IPA: [tɕɪˈpaɪf]) is a 1934 Soviet biographical war film, directed by the Vasilyev brothers for Lenfilm. A heavily-fictionalised biography of Vasily Ivanovich Chapayev (1887–1919), a notable Red Army commander during the Russian Civil War, it is based on the novel of the same name by Dmitry Furmanov, a Russian writer and Bolshevik commissar who fought together with Chapayev.

Soviet dictator Joseph Stalin considered Chapaev to be the best film in Soviet cinematography and watched it more than 30 times between 1934 and 1936. President Vladimir Putin also proclaimed Chapaev to be his favorite film.

== Plot ==
Chapaev (1934)

The film centers around a Red Army division commanded by Vasily Chapayev in their fight against White Army troops commanded by Colonel Borozdin. A Commissar named Furmanov is delegated to the division from Moscow, and although he initially does not get along with Chapayev, he proves his worth by resolving a conflict that arises when Chapayev's men steal from local peasants and the two become good friends.

With the help of Chapayev's adjutant Petka and the machine gunner Anka (who develop a love interest over the course of the film), and with intelligence provided by Borozdin's defecting aide Petrovich, the division manages to repel an attack from the White Army troops.

Higher-ups in Moscow reassign Furmanov to another Red Army division, and the situation soon deteriorates. Under the cover of darkness, Borozdin and his men attack Chapayev's headquarters. Despite their heroic efforts, Petka and Chapayev are killed. Their sacrifices are avenged, however, as Anka alerts the rest of the division and a counterattack is shown to be successful in the final shots of the film.

== Cast ==
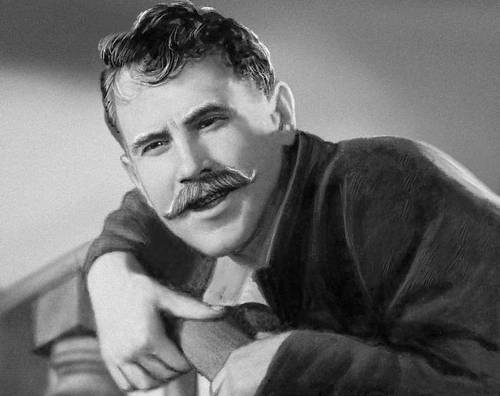
Boris Babochkin as Vasily Chapayev

- Boris Babochkin – Vasily Chapayev
- Boris Blinov – Dmitry Furmanov
- Varvara Myasnikova – Anka
- Leonid Kmit – Petka
- Illarion Pevtsov – Colonel Sergei Nikolayveitch Borozdin
- Stepan Shkurat – Potapov (Petrovich), Borozdin's batman
- Vyacheslav Volkov – Elan Brigade Commander
- Nikolay Simonov – platoon commander Zhiharev
- Elena Volintseva – farmer
- Boris Chirkov – farmer
- Sergei Vasilyev – Lieutenant
- Georgiy Zhzhonov – Teryosha's, Furmanov's orderly
- Mikhail Rostovtsev – Veterinarian
- Andrei Apsolon – Red Army soldier
- Stepan Krylov – Red Army soldier
- Georgi Vasilyev – officer with a cigarette
- Victor Yablonsky – Cossack Plastun (uncredited)
- Emil Gal – veterinary assistant (uncredited)
- Konstantin Nazarenko – trouble-making partisan (uncredited)
- Pavel Leshkov – Borozdin's interlocutor (uncredited)

== Style ==
Chapayev follows the socialist realist style, the dominant form of art in the Soviet Union during the time period. To maintain a "realistic" depiction of the world, the camera work is predictable and repetitive, almost mechanical.

The relationship between Chapayev and Furmanov, which is central to the plot of the film, is typical for a Soviet socialist realist film. Both men are supremely competent in their respective roles as commander and commissar. Chapayev is a heroic figure who represents the common Russian man; he is uneducated, he swears, and he acts disorderly. In contrast, Furmanov, who represents the Party and Communist ideology, is more orderly and domineering; in scenes where the two interact, Furmanov is positioned higher in the frame to indicate his superior status.

== Reception ==
Chapaev premiered on 6 November 1934, in the Leningrad cinema "Titan"; it quickly became one of the most popular films in the Soviet Union. Within the first year it was watched by 30 million people in the USSR alone. Such was the popularity of the film that an editorial in Pravda on 21 November proclaimed, "The whole country will watch Chapaev".

It was awarded "Best Foreign Film" by the US National Board of Review in 1935 and the Grand-Prix of the Paris World Fair in 1937.

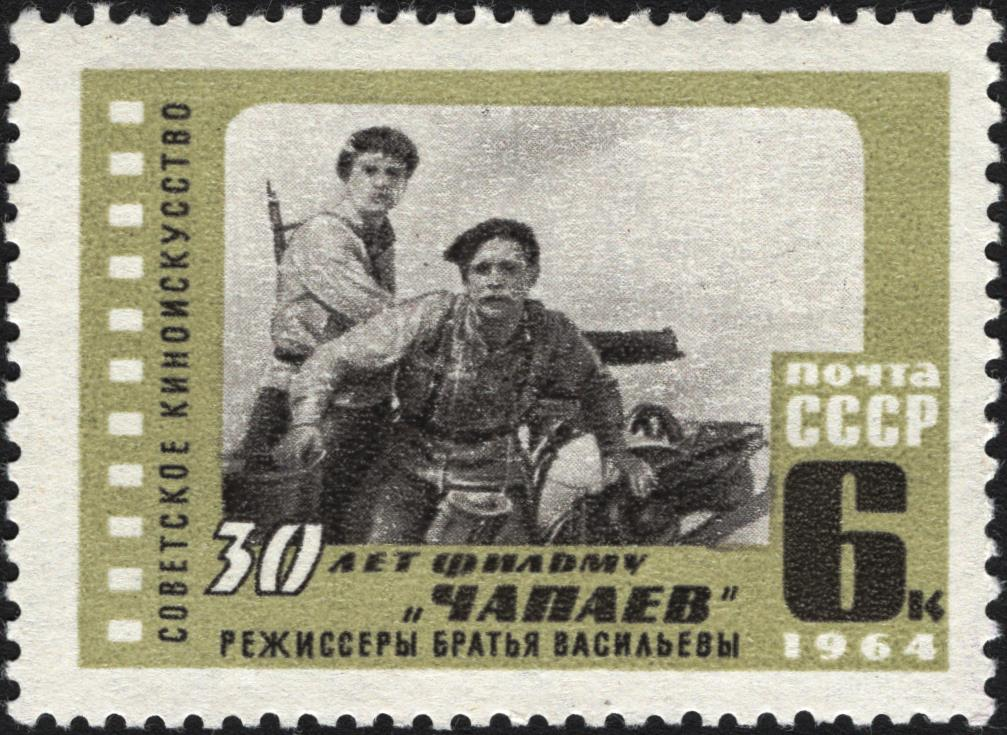
Russian stamp commemorating the 30th anniversary of Chapaev

In a 1978 poll of cinema critics, the film was considered one of the best 100 films in history.

== Influence ==
After the release of the film, Chapayev and his assistants Petka and Anka became Russian folklore characters. These three, together with their political commissar Furmanov, are present in a large number of Russian jokes.

The real Chapayev was already a war hero, but the film increased his heroic status further. When boys would play Reds vs. Whites, they would often imagine themselves to be Chapayev or his heroic adjutant Petka.
