= The Defense of Tsaritsyn =

1942 Soviet drama film

- Russian: Оборона Царицына
- Directed by: Vasilyev brothers
- Written by: Vasilyev brothers
- Starring: Mikheil Gelovani; Nikolay Bogolyubov; Mikhail Zharov; Varvara Myasnikova; Pyotr Nikashin
- Cinematography: Apollinari Dudko; Sergei Ivanov; Aleksandr Sigaev
- Edited by: Stera Gorakova
- Music by: Nikolai Kryukov
- Release date: 1942
- Country: Soviet Union
- Language: Russian

The Defense of Tsaritsyn (Russian: Оборона Царицына) is a 1942 Soviet war film directed by the Vasilyev brothers.

== Plot ==
The film tells about the defense of Tsaritsyn by the Red Army during the Russian Civil War, under the leadership of Stalin and Voroshilov.

== Cast ==
- Mikheil Gelovani as Joseph Stalin
- Nikolay Bogolyubov as Kliment Voroshilov
- Mikhail Zharov as Perchikhin
- Varvara Myasnikova as Katya Davydova
- Pyotr Nikashin as Parkhomenko
- Pavel Kadochnikov as Rudnev
- Vladimir Gremin as Nosovich
- Vasili Sofronov as Ryndin
- Boris Babochkin as Moldavskiy

== Trivia ==
A scene from this movie was featured in the feature film Amelie from 2001, but with different subtitles, referring to Amelie, the main character of the movie.
