= Vasily Chapayev =

Red Army commander (1887–1919)

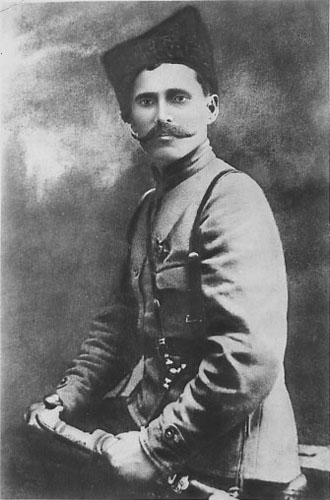
- Born: 9 February 1887; Budayka, Kazan Governorate, Russian Empire (now part of Cheboksary, Chuvashia, Russia)
- Died: 5 September 1919 (aged 32); Ural Oblast, Russian SFSR (now part of West Kazakhstan Region, Kazakhstan)
- Known for: Red Army commander during the Russian Civil War
- Parent(s): Ivan Stepanovich Chapaev, Yekaterina Semyonovna Chapaeva
- Awards: Cross of St. George (3)

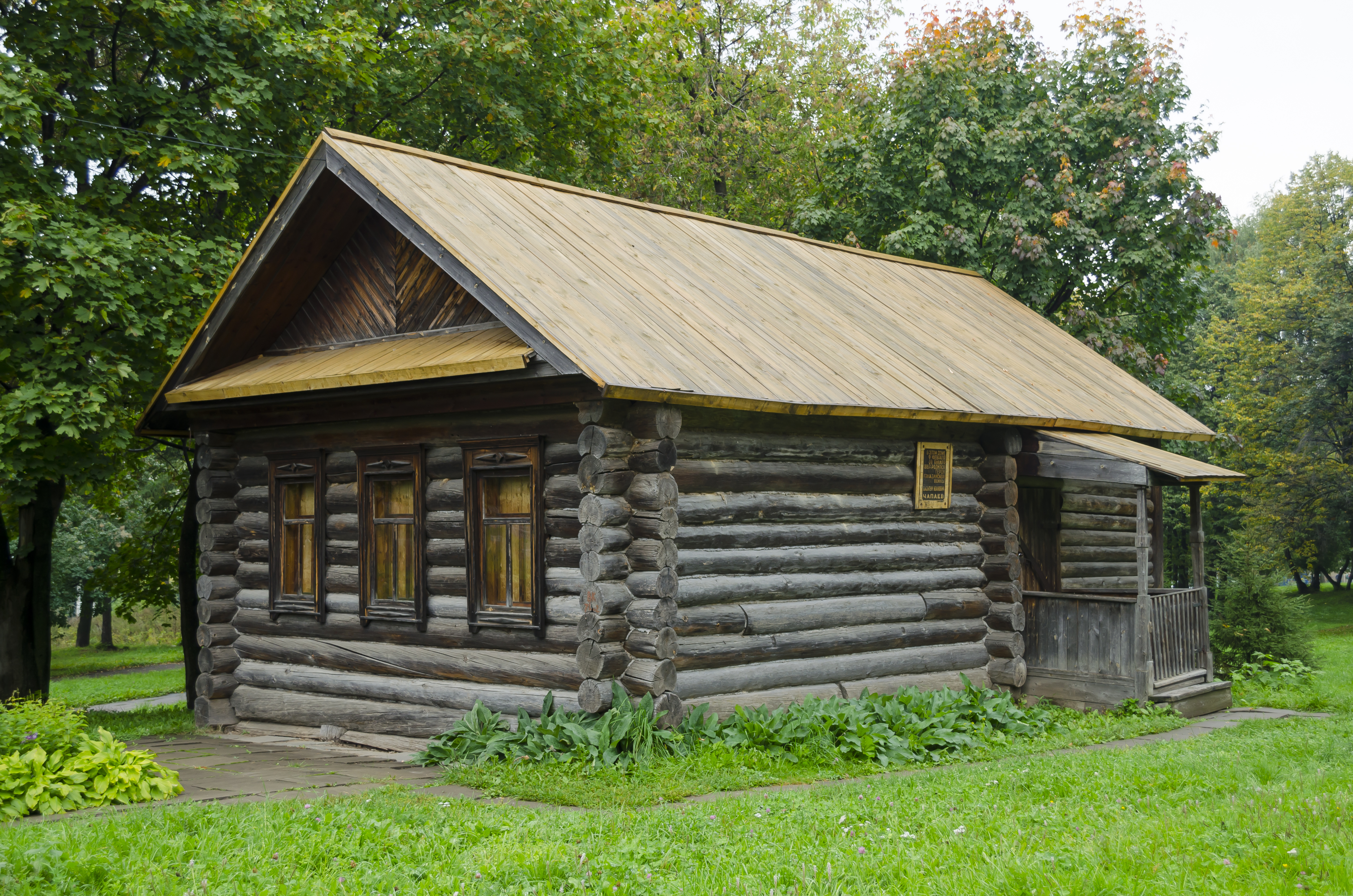
Сhapayev's birthplace (today the house-museum "Chapayevs' Log House"; moved from the original location)

Vasily Ivanovich Chapayev (Note: Also transliterated as Chapaev) (Russian: Василий Иванович Чапаев; 9 February [O.S. 28 January] 1887 – 5 September 1919) was a Russian soldier and Red Army commander during the Russian Civil War.

== Biography ==
Chapayev was born into a poor peasant family in the village of Budayka, now part of Cheboksary. During World War I he fought as a non-commissioned officer and was awarded the Cross of St. George three times.

In September 1917, he joined the Russian Social Democratic Labour Party (Bolsheviks). In December he was elected commander of the 138 Infantry Regiment by a vote of the regiment's soldiers. He commanded the 2nd Nikolaev Division; then from 9 April 1919 he commanded the 25th Rifle Division.

During the Russian Civil War Chapaev participated in campaigns against the Ural Cossacks and the Czechoslovak Legion. As commander of the 25th Rifle division he took part in the capture of Ufa in June 1919.

=== Death ===
On 5 September 1919, the divisional headquarters near Lbishchensk (in present-day Kazakhstan, the settlement was later renamed Chapayev in his honour) were ambushed by White Army forces (Lbishchensk raid). The circumstances of Chapayev's death are uncertain and his body was never recovered. The canonical version — that the wounded Chapayev drowned when trying to cross the Ural River — was particularly popularized by the 1934 film Chapayev (which was approved by Stalin himself and quickly gained cult status not only in the Soviet Union, but among Russian emigrants as well).

Other versions have circulated. In 1926 the newspapers Pravda, Izvestia and Krasnaya Zvezda reported on the arrest of the former Cossack officer Trofimov-Mirsky, who allegedly shot Chapaev after capturing him during a raid on Lbishensk. Chapaev's daughter Klavdiya and his great-granddaughter Yevgeniya wrote about the betrayal of the commander and the organization of his death by Leon Trotsky, as well as about the participation in the conspiracy of Chapaev's partner Pelageya Kameshkertseva. None of the "non-canonical" versions have documentary evidence to support them.

== Private life ==
In 1908 Chapayev became acquainted with Pelageya Metelina, who was 18. Although his father didn't approve of their relations, Chapayev married her. They lived together for 6 years, and had three children, one of whom was Klavdiya Chapayeva. Though there was no official divorce, in 1917 Chapayev started living with the widow of his deceased fellow-soldier Pyotr Kishkertsev. Her name was also Pelageya. Chapayev adopted both of her children. Currently the only relative that remains is his great-great-granddaughter Vasilisa Chapayeva, with her parents Yevgenia Chapayeva and Viktor Pecherin.

== Legacy ==
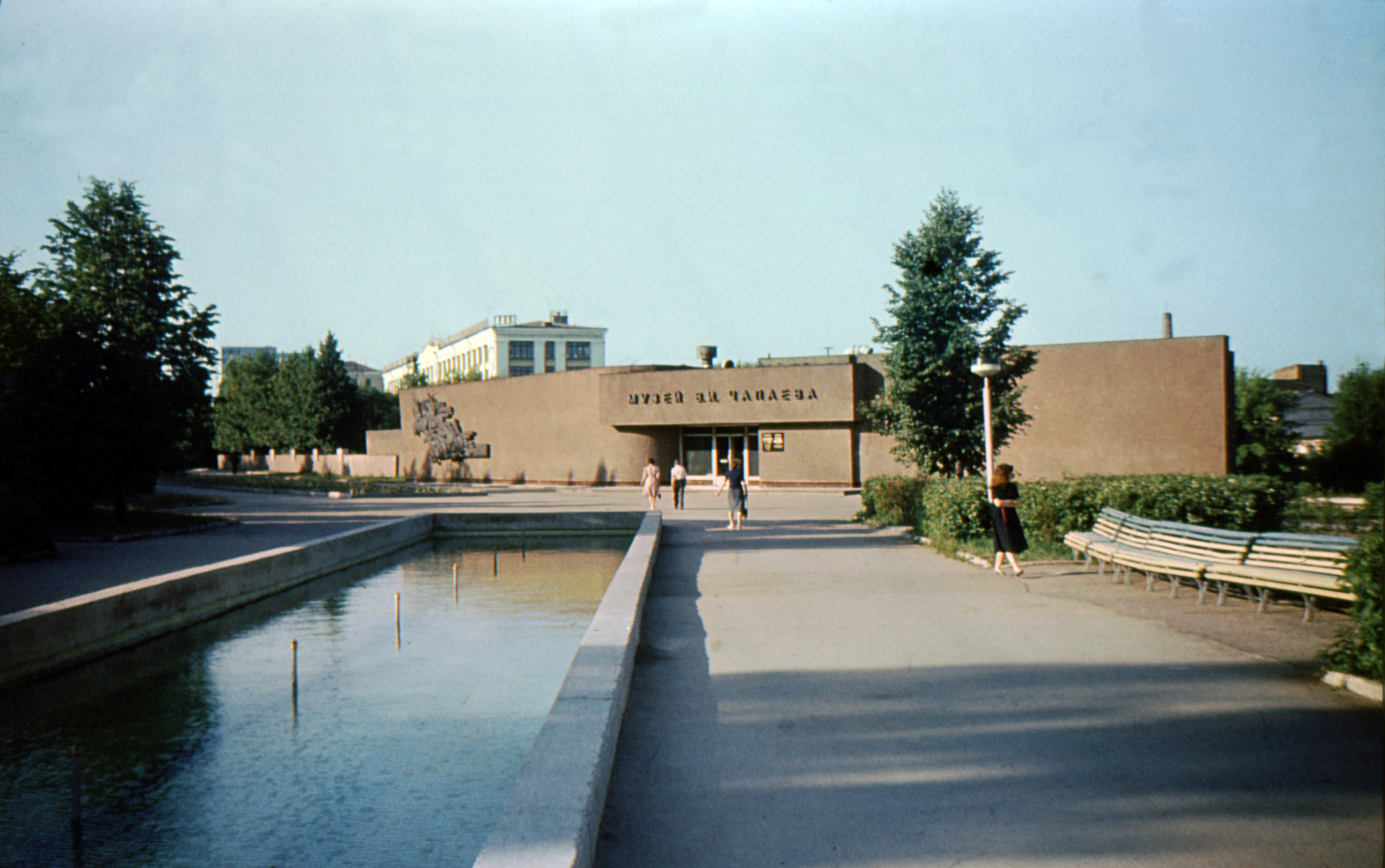
The Chapaev museum in Cheboksary, Russia

Memorial museums of Chapaev were opened in Cheboksary near the place of his birth; in the city of Pugachev (former Nikolaevsk), with a branch in the city of Balakovo, where he spent his childhood and youth. Museums have also been opened in the buildings where the headquarters of the 25th Infantry Division was located during the Civil War: in the village of Krasny Yar in the Ufimsky district of the Republic of Bashkortostan, in the town of Belebey of the Republic of Bashkortostan, in the city of Uralsk and in the village of Lbischenskaya (now the town of Chapaev) at the site of the last battle division chief. In the Soviet years, museums dedicated to Chapaev and the combat path of the 25th division existed in many schools.

Dozens of settlements in the Samara (Chapayevsk), Saratov, Orenburg regions and other regions of Russia are named after Chapaev, Lbishensk in modern Kazakhstan was also renamed in his honor during the Soviet era, Chapaev streets exist in hundreds of settlements on the territory of the former USSR, the Chapaevka River was named after him. In 1937, the Kiev cinema "Lira" on Bolshaya Zhitomirskaya Street, 40 was renamed the "Chapaev cinema".

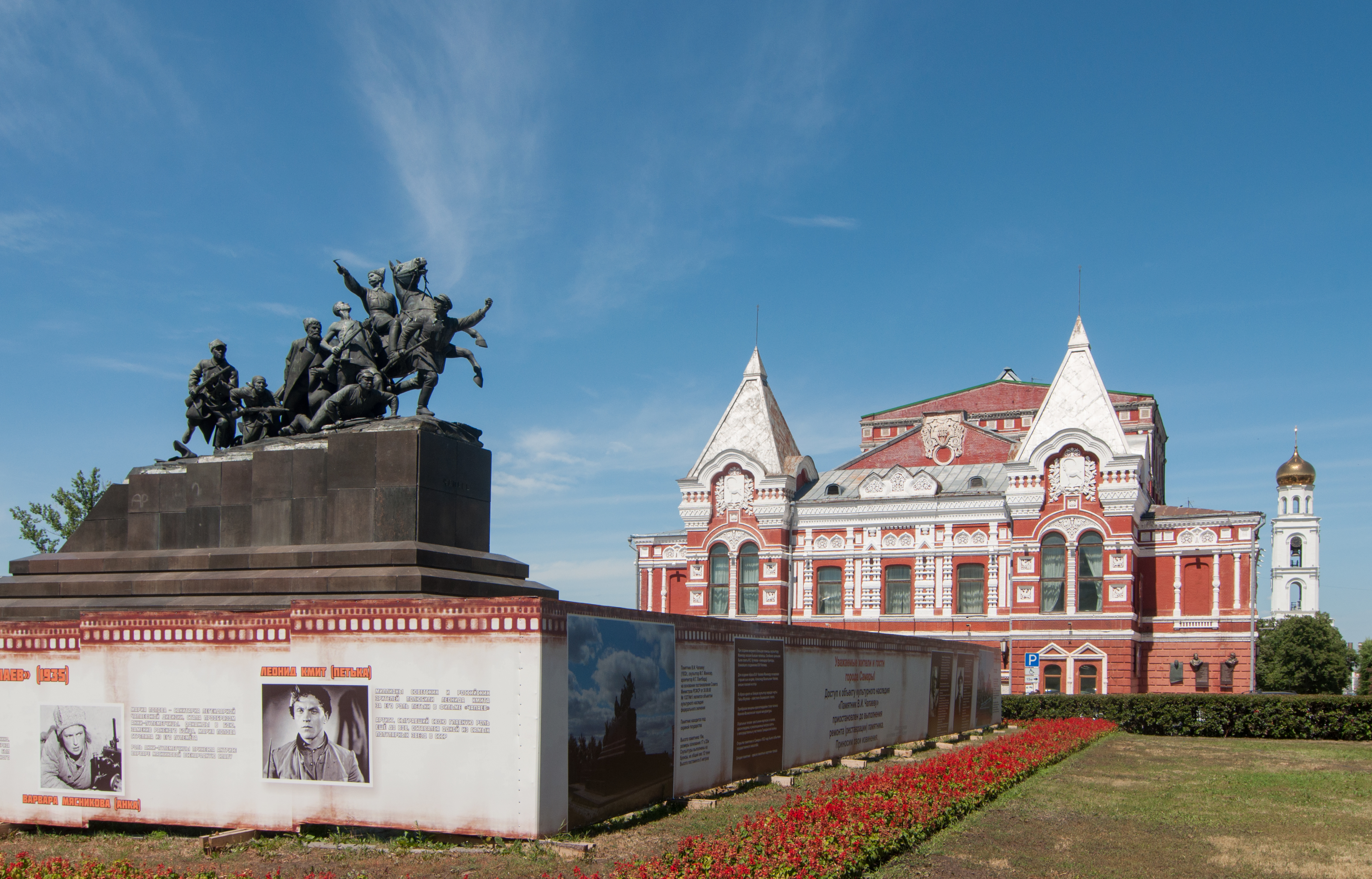
Monument to Chapaev and the drama theatre in Samara, Russia

Monuments to Chapaev were erected in the cities of Samara (1932), in St. Petersburg (1933), in Pugachev (1957), in Cheboksary (1960) (earlier since the 1930s it was located on the territory of VDNKh in Moscow), in the village of Chapaev - a stele at the site of the alleged death and a monument on the central square (1979), in Uralsk (1982), as well as in dozens of other cities and towns of the former Soviet Union. In 1973, for the museum in Uralsk, Efim Deshalyt painted the diorama "The Last Battle of Chapaev", in 1976 for the museum in Chapaev - the diorama "Fight of the Chapaevs in the village of Lbischenskaya" by artists Veniamin Sibirsky and Evgeny Danilevsky.

== In Russian culture ==
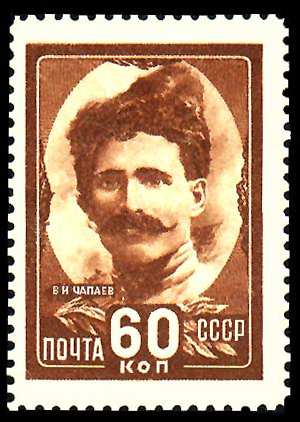
Chapayev on a 1948 Soviet postage stamp

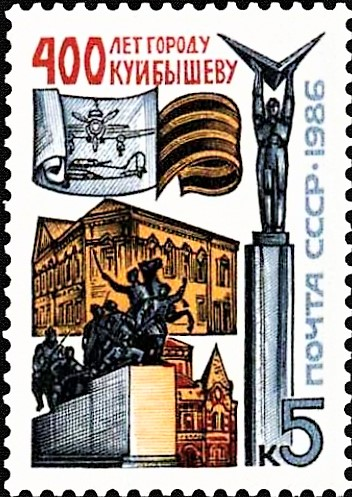
The monument to Chapaev in Samara on a 1986 Soviet stamp commemorating the city's 400th anniversary

After the Soviet Union had been established, Chapayev was immortalized by Soviet propaganda as a hero of the Russian Civil War. In 1923, a Russian writer, Dmitriy Furmanov, who served as a commissar in Chapayev's division wrote a popular novel entitled Chapaev. Later, in 1934, it was made into a film Chapayev by the Vasilyev brothers. The movie became highly popular in the Soviet Union. The German actor and singer Ernst Busch also recorded the song Tschapajews Tod, which talks about his death in the Ural.

More recently, he became one of the central characters in the novel Chapayev and Void by modern Russian writer Viktor Pelevin.

In November 1998, Red Comrades Save the Galaxy, a point-and-click graphic adventure game was developed by S.K.I.F. and published by Buka Entertainment (now 1C Company). The game's protagonist Vasily Ivanovich Chapaev, is inspired by Chapayev.

Chapayev, along with his aide Petka, commissar Furmanov, and Anka the Machine-gunner, became a recurring character in popular Russian jokes.

== See also ==
- Outline of the Russian Revolution and Civil War
- Bibliography of the Russian Revolution and Civil War
- Bibliography of Stalinism and the Soviet Union
- Index of Old Bolsheviks
- Index of articles related to the Russian Revolution and Civil War
- Chapayev, a board game named after Chapayev
- Red Comrades Save the Galaxy, a point-and-click graphic adventure game which features a main character inspired by Chapayev
- Chapayevsk
- Chapayev-class cruiser, a group of cruisers built for the Soviet Navy
- Chapaev Battalion
- Chapaev Peak, a mountain in Kyrgyzstan named after Chapayev

== Bibliography ==
- Дайнес, В. О. (2010). Чапаев. Великие исторические персоны (5000 экз ed.). М.: Вече. ISBN 978-5-9533-4952-9.
