= Vladimir Rapoport =

Soviet cinematographer

Vladimir Abramovich Rapoport (Russian: Владимир Абрамович Рапопорт; 6 November 1907, Vitebsk – 17 June 1975, Moscow) was a Soviet cinematographer, known for his collaboration with film director Sergei Gerasimov.

== Biography ==
Rapoport was born in Vitebsk as Vulf Abramovich Rapoport (Russian: Вульф Абрамович Рапопорт).

He was married to actress Zoya Fyodorova from 1934 to 1939.

In 1943, while filming She Defends the Motherland, he met actress Lidiya Smirnova, with whom he began to live in cohabitation, sharing the apartment together in the Kotelnicheskaya Embankment Building.

He died in Moscow aged 67, and was buried at the Vvedenskoye Cemetery.

== Filmography ==
=== Cinematographer ===
- Golden Mountains (1931)
- Counterplan (1932)
- Girl Friends (1936)
- At the Border (1938)
- Friends (1938)
- The Girl from Leningrad (1941)
- She Defends the Motherland (1943)
- The Young Guard (1948)
- The Star (1949)
- The New China (1950)
- The Village Doctor (1951)
- Vassa Zheleznova (1953)
- Least We Forget (1954)
- And Quiet Flows the Don (1958)
- 20,000 Leagues Across the Land (1961)
- Men and Beasts (1962)
- Comrade Arseny (1964)
- The Journalist (1967)
- Village Detective (1969)
- By the Lake (1969)
- The Love of Mankind (1972)
- Daughters-Mothers (1974)
- Aniskin and Fantomas (1974)

=== Director ===
- Big Fitil (1963)
- Aniskin and Fantomas (1974; together with Mikhail Zharov)

== Awards and honors ==
- Order of the Red Banner of Labour (1939) – for film At the Border
- Two Stalin Prizes second degree:
  - 1942 – for film The Girl from Leningrad
  - 1946 – for film She Defends the Motherland
- Two Stalin Prizes first degree:
  - 1949 – for film The Young Guard
  - 1951 – for film The New China
- USSR State Prize (1971) – for film By the Lake
