= The Love of Mankind =

- Russian: Любить человека
- Directed by: Sergei Gerasimov
- Written by: Sergei Gerasimov
- Produced by: Arkady Kushlyansky
- Starring: Anatoly Solonitsyn; Lyubov Virolaynen; Tamara Makarova; Zhanna Bolotova; Ivan Neganov
- Cinematography: Vladimir Rapoport
- Edited by: Lidiya Zhuchkova
- Music by: Ilya Kataev
- Production company: Gorky Film Studio
- Release date: 1972
- Running time: 167 min.
- Country: Soviet Union
- Language: Russian

The Love of Mankind (Russian: Любить человека, romanized: Lyubit cheloveka) is a 1972 Soviet drama film directed by Sergei Gerasimov.

== Plot ==
The film is about an architect who is passionate about his work and who has not experienced a feeling of love for 35 years of his life. And so he falls in love and begins to live with a woman. And he begins to understand that love brings not only happiness, but also drama.

== Cast ==
- Anatoly Solonitsyn as Dmitri Kalmykov
- Lyubov Virolaynen as Maria
- Tamara Makarova as Aleksandra Vasilyeva Petrushkova
- Zhanna Bolotova as Tanya Pavlova
- Ivan Neganov as Ivan Semyonovich Sarychev
- Mikhail Zimin as Bogachev
- Yuri Kuzmenkov as Yuri Alexandrovich Strumilin
- Nikolai Yeremenko Jr. as Kolya
- Vladimir Kashpur as Rastorguev
- Anatoli Romashin as Arkhangelsky, Maria's ex-husband
