= Nikolay Smorchkov =

Soviet and Russian actor (1930–2021)

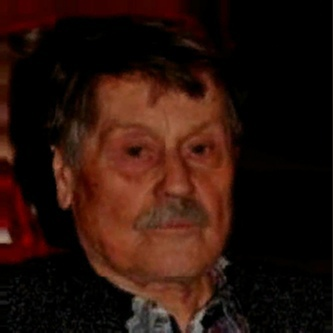
- Born: Nikolay Gavrilovich Smorchkov; 9 August 1930; Ivankovo, Gavrilovo-Posadsky District, Ivanovo Oblast, USSR
- Died: 7 March 2021 (aged 90); Moscow, Russia
- Occupation: actor
- Years active: 1951–2021
- Spouse: Nina Alexandrovna Smorchkova
- Children: 2

Nikolay Gavrilovich Smorchkov (Russian: Николай Гаврилович Сморчков; 9 August 1930 – 7 March 2021) was a Soviet and Russian film actor.

== Biography ==
Nikolay Smorchkov was born on 9 August 1930 in the village of Ivankovo, Gavrilovo-Posadsky District, in a large peasant family named Gavril Ivanovich and Pelageya Matveyevna. In 1933, fleeing Collectivization, the family moved to the village of Orgtrud, which was not far from Vladimir (now the district of the city). Being still in the 7th grade, the future actor caught a movie and decided to become a film actor.

After graduation Smorchkov came to Moscow and entered the VGIK (course of Sergei Gerasimov and Tamara Makarova), where he had to deal specially with removing his pronounced accent. While still in his second year in 1951, he played his first role in Gerasimov's film The Village Doctor. He graduated from VGIK in 1953 with a red diploma. After graduating from the institute, the actor was enrolled in the theater-studio of the film actor and the film studio Mosfilm, where he worked for almost forty years. On the stage of the theater he played in the play The Evening of Old Vaudevilles, went with him on tour, but then completely switched to cinema.

He starred in more than 160 films.

Smorchkov died on 7 March 2021 from COVID-19 amid the COVID-19 pandemic in Russia. He was 90.

== Selected filmography ==
- The Village Doctor (1951) as Zhenya Strukov
- Mysterious Discovery (1953) as sailor
- True Friends (1954) as Alexey Mazayev
- The Cranes Are Flying (1957) as patient in hospital
- Ballad of a Soldier (1959) as soldier
- Female Age-Mates (1959) as Anikin
- Five Days, Five Nights (1960) as soldier
- Ivan's Childhood (1962) as petty officer
- War and Peace (1965—1967) as Russian soldier
- The Secret Agent's Blunder (1968) as freak
- The Red Tent (1969) as sailor
- Gentlemen of Fortune (1971) as police officer
- Liberation (1971) as captain Neustroyev's orderly
- Incorrigible Liar (1973) as MFA employee
- Earthly Love (1974) as builder
- Jarosław Dąbrowski (1976) as non-commissioned officer
- The Days of the Turbins (1976) as First Officer
- Destiny (1977) as partisan
- Air Crew (1979) as airport guard
- Fox Hunting (1980) as militiaman
- Tree Dzhamal (1981) as Gromov
- A Cruel Romance (1984) as Priest
- Alone and Unarmed (1984) as Treshchalov
- Promised Heaven (1991) as Timofeich
- The Thief (1997) as janitor
- Schizophrenia (1997) as police sergeant
- Tycoon (2002) as Old man
- Tins (2007) as veteran
- Space Dogs (2010) as Professor (voice)
