= Korniyenko =

Korniyenko or Kornienko (Ukrainian: Корнієнко Russian: Корниенко) is a Ukrainian-language surname. It is a patronymic surname derived from the first name Korniy (Корній).

Variants: Belarusian: Karneyenka (Карнеенка), Russian: Корнеенко [Korneyenko/Korneenko].

== People ==
- Alexei Kornienko (born 1954), Russian-born Austrian conductor and pianist
- Gennady Kornienko, director of the Russian Federal Penitentiary Service
- Georgy Korniyenko (1925–2006), Soviet diplomat
- Maksym Korniyenko (born 1987), Ukrainian basketball player
- Mikhail Kornienko (born 1960), Russian cosmonaut
- Nelly Korniyenko (1938–2019), Soviet actress
- Oleg Kornienko (born 1973), Russian and Kazakhstani footballer
- Oleksandr Kornienko (born 1984), Ukrainian politician
- Valery Kornienko (born 1961), Soviet pair skater
- Valentyn Kornienko (1939–2011), Ukrainian translator
- Viktor Korniyenko (born 1999), Ukrainian footballer
