= Nikolai Yeremenko Sr. =

- Николай Ерёменко-старший
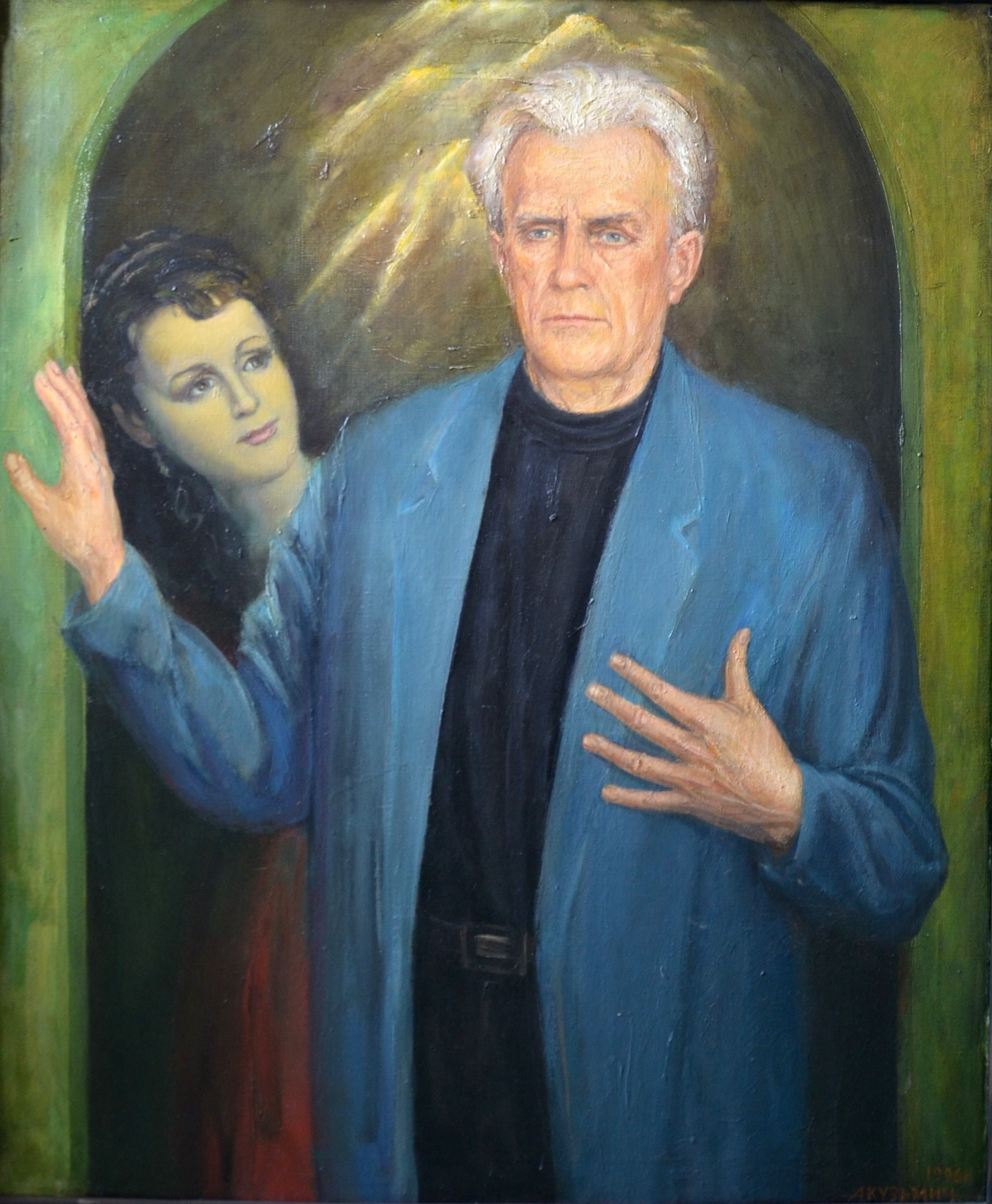
- Portrait, 1996
- Born: Nikolai Nikolaevich Yeremenko; 16 June 1926; Novosibirsk, RSFSR, USSR
- Died: 30 June 2000 (aged 74); Minsk, Belarus
- Occupations: Stage and film actor
- Years active: 1948-2000
- Spouse: Galina Orlova (born 1928)

Nikolai Nikolaevich Yeremenko Sr. (Belarusian: Мікалай Мікалаевіч Яроменка (старэйшы); (Russian: Никола́й Никола́евич Ерёменко-ста́рший) was a Belarusian Soviet film and theater actor. People's Artist of the USSR (1989).

Member of the Great Patriotic War. He managed to survive in a Nazi concentration camp.

After graduating in 1948, the studio theater of the Yakub Kolas Belarusian Drama Theater in Vitebsk, he became a theater actor (1948-1959). Since 1959 an actor of Yanka Kupala National Academic Theatre.

He began acting in films in 1960.

His son was also an actor, Nikolai Yeremenko Jr. (1949-2001).

== Partial filmography ==
- Men and Beasts (1962) as Pavlov
- Flying Days (1966) as aviation regiment commander
- Liberation III: Direction of the Main Blow (1971) as Josip Broz Tito
- Hot Snow (1972) as Drozdovsky
- Sokolovo (1974) as aviation regiment commander
- Eternal Call (1976) as aviation regiment commander
- Soldiers of Freedom (1977) as Josip Broz Tito
- Petrovka, 38 (1980) as Militia General
- The Man Who Doesn't Return (1991) as Viktor Andreevich
