= The Youth of Peter the Great =

- Directed by: Sergey Gerasimov
- Screenplay by: Sergey Gerasimov; Yuri Kavtaradze
- Starring: Dmitri Zolotukhin; Tamara Makarova; Natalya Bondarchuk; Nikolai Yeremenko Jr. Mikhail Nozhkin; Boris Khmelnitsky; Lyubov Germanova; Ivan Lapikov; Lyubov Polekhina; Marina Levtova
- Cinematography: Sergey Filippov, Horst Hardt
- Music by: Vladimir Martynov
- Production company: Gorky Film Studio
- Distributed by: Russian Cinema Council
- Release date: 1980 (USSR)
- Running time: 140 minutes
- Country: Soviet Union
- Language: Russian

The Youth of Peter the Great (Russian: Юность Петра, romanized: Yunost Petra) is a first part of a two-part film, which was based on the novel Peter I, written by Aleksey Tolstoy. The film was directed by a famous Russian director Sergei Gerasimov. The movie is considered to be a classic of Russian historical cinema.

== Plot ==
The film begins with two merchants, Ivan Brovkin and Gypsy discussing the current rumor about the death of the former czar, and no heir on a throne yet, while sitting in a horse-drawn sleigh. Meantime the Streltsy are revolting against czarevna Sophia, and wanting Natalya Naryshkina to be in charge of a nation instead.

One day 17-year-old Peter gone missing, but it turned out that he actually went to German Sloboda to spend time with Franz, one of the German officers, who invited him over to show the hand-made music box that he had made. In the house he was introduced to Anna Montz, whom he met on a lake playing her mandolin in a boat, and with whom he already fell in love with. The guard, who was sent by Peter's mother to find him, was sent home by Peter himself. Peter left the house with promise from an officer: To build him an army, which will suppress the Streltsy. He also promised to promote him to a General, if he will do it. Immediately after Peter left, Franz starts building the army for Peter the Great. Meantime, Peter helps people with building fortresses, with boyars laughing in the back. Peter's mother decided to talk about Peter's marriage with Nikita Moiseyevich. She wants him to marry a girl from okolnichy under the name of Eudoxia Lopukhina, a girl from a noble family, that will be Peter's wife and a throne-keeper. Couple days later, Peter's mom decided to talk to him about the person whom she believes he should marry. But Peter still wants Anna Montz to be his wife, and storms out of the room, despite mothers soothing tone, and a warning of not to panic. Amid the completion of army training for His Majesty, Franz gets promoted to the General, and is awarded with a silver saber.

Meanwhile, Peter organizes a party in his honor, by coming there with Nikita Moiseyevich. Anna Montz congratulates Franz and gives him flowers, but decides to go and dance with Peter instead. After the dance Peter kissed her, but she kissed him back and ran away. Peter chased after her, but he didn't know where she lived. His friend, Alyosha Brovkin, told him where her house is, and together they went. Unfortunately, Anna yelled out of the window that they can't come in into her room, because she prefers to sleep alone for now. After that Peter promised Alyosha to enlist him into the army under His Majesty's service. Next day, Alyosha came with a drum to demonstrate to His Majesty, his duty it the armed forces. Peter admired his drumming skills, and let him be his troop morale raiser. After the inclusion of a new troop morale raiser into an army, one of Peter's friends decided to suggest him to change is mind on Anna Montz, hinting on her being a Lutheran, which in a long run might devastate his nation. Peter however, worries about his assassination, and is desperate of comfortship, which Anna, he thinks will provide. Peter the Great is now officially marries Eudoxia Lopukhina, and as soon as heard of his mother's decision on it, he rushed to the Anna Montz house. Both Anna and Peter saw each other at her house, they hugged and Anna was crying. Peter tried to comfort, in a way that he understands her feeling toward him, but he can't change it. Peter becomes czar in the end of part one.

Part two starts off with merchants Ivan Brovkin and Gypsy meet each other on the market, and started discussing upcoming Russo-Turkish war. One of the Streltsy members found out, that Natalya Naryshkina, the current czarevna of Russia, wants to send all of them to different cities, and leave them in monasteries. Also, she will deny them of Streltsy honor. The Streltsy are also worry that the current czar, Peter the Great, won't defend them either. They believe that killing the czar is the only option. So, to save their own skin, the leader of Streltsy opens his evil plan: The gang of a 100 men will burn the palace, and if the czar will survive they will poke him with pikes and halberdiers till he dies. The plan however, did not work out, because one of the czars guards found out about the evil plan. All of the Streltsy were captured near the palace, and brought to Peter himself. He of course proposed torture by giving the Streltsy leader 35 lashes. Meantime the court reads the accusation letter in which the Streltsy leader mentioned as drunk, and that he was saying "that he wants to kill the czar by throwing grenades inside of the palace, and then kill him if he comes out alive". The leader mentions Vasily Galitzine as a co-conspirator.

The guards then are sent to find and arrest Vasily. They didn't look long, they found him at his house, and ordered him to pack up his stuff. Upon arriving to meet His Majesty, he is greeted with a letter that is being read by a guard, in which says that: "He (Vasily Galitzine will be dishonored of his boyar duty, and will be sent to a monastery with his wife and children for life to a city of Kargopol". Next day, Peter and Franz witnessed His Majesty's dream. The Naval ships are firing. That means, that Russia is one step closer to the war with Turkey. At night Franz suggested Peter to capture Azov and Black Seas, that way Russia will have access to the south seas, instead of relying on only the north ones. The movie ends with Ivan Brovkin coming to Peter the Great with a letter, which he reads by himself to him. In the letter, he asks Peter to allow him using the ships of His Majesty, for trade with other nation. Peter agrees with the idea, and commands to build two more ships, that will be used for trade. For the first time in Russian history, the country have it first commercial fleet. After Ivan left, Peter signs the commercial fleet bill into law.

== Oddities ==
Some German officers speak English in the film, despite their German heritage.

== Cast ==
- Dmitri Zolotukhin — Peter the Great
- Tamara Makarova — Natalya Naryshkina
- Aleksandr Belyavskiy — Lev Naryshkin, Peter's uncle
- Natalya Bondarchuk — Czarevna Sophia
- Nikolai Yeremenko Jr. — Aleksandr Danilovich Menshikov
- Mikhail Nozhkin — Knyaz Boris Alexeyevich Galitzine
- Boris Khmelnitsky — Kuzma Chermnyi
- Lyubov Germanova — Eudoxia Lopukhina
- Ivan Lapikov — Zhemov
- Lyubov Polekhina — Sanka Brovkina
- Marina Levtova — Olga Bulnosova
- Yekaterina Vasillyeva — Antonida Bulnosova
- Pyotr Glebov — Gypsy
- Marina Golub — Verka
- Muza Krepkogorskaya — Sparrow caregiver
- Yuri Moroz — Alyosha Brovkin
- Peter Reusse — Franz Lefort
- Eduard Bocharov — Merchant Ivan Brovkin
- Anatoli Barantsev — Nikita Zotov
- Roman Filippov — Fyodor Romodanovsky
- Vladimir Kashpur — Ovdokim
- Nikolai Grinko — Starets Nektari

== Similar films ==
- At the Beginning of Glorious Days

== Sources ==
- The Youth of Peter the Great at IMDb
