= Valentina Telegina =

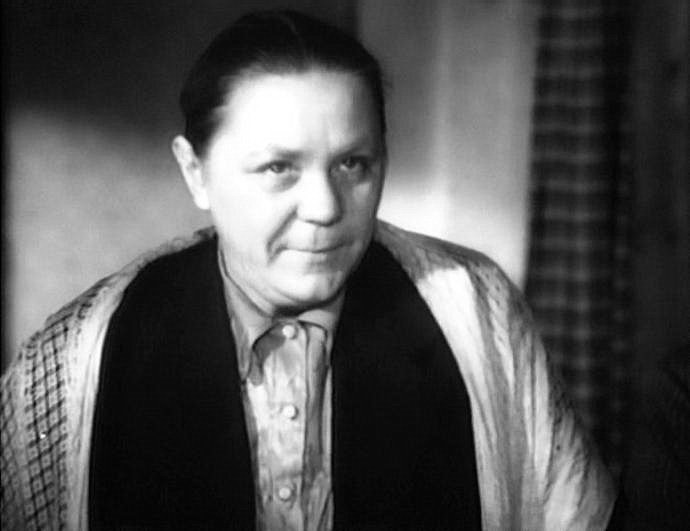
- Born: February 23, 1915; Novocherkassk, Don Host Oblast, Russian Empire
- Died: October 4, 1979 (aged 64); Moscow, RSFSR, Soviet Union
- Occupation: Actress
- Years active: 1934—1978

Valentina Petrovna Telegina (Russian: Валенти́на Петро́вна Теле́гина; February 23, 1915 — October 4, 1979) was a Soviet and Russian actress.

== Biography ==
Valentina Petrovna Telegina was born on February 23, 1915, in Novocherkassk, capital of Don Cossacks (now the Rostov Oblast).

In 1937, she graduated from the Leningrad Institute of Performing Arts, workshop of Sergei Gerasimov.

In 1937 she became an actress of Saint Petersburg Lensoviet Theatre, moving to the Baltic Fleet Theatre in 1940, until 1941.

She started acting in films in 1934. She had her first big role as Motya Kotenkova in Sergei Gerasimov's film Komsomolsk, released in 1938.

After the war she moved to Moscow, working at the Gorky Film Studio from 1946.

She aimed to embody the character of the Russian woman in all its diversity.

Telegina died on October 4, 1979. She was buried in Moscow at the Mitinskoe Cemetery.

== Selected filmography ==
- Komsomolsk (1938) as Motya Kotenkova
- The New Teacher (1939) as Stepanida Ivanovna Lautina
- Member of the Government (1939) as Praskovya Telegina
- The District Secretary (1942) as Darya
- Springtime (1947) as Researcher
- The Train Goes East (1947) as Pasha
- The Precious Seed (1948) as Varvara Stepanovna Kurochkina
- Cossacks of the Kuban (1950) as Avdotya Khristoforovna
- The Village Doctor (1951) as medical orderly
- Sporting Honour (1951) as Vetlugina
- The Frigid Sea (1954) as Terentyevna
- World Champion (1954) as aunt Polya
- Sailor Chizhik (1955) as Avdotya Petrovna
- The Drummer's Fate (1955) as aunt Tanya
- Pavel Korchagin (1956) as moonshiner
- It Happened in Penkovo (1957) as Alevtina
- The House I Live In (1957) as Klavdia Kondratyevna Davydova
- Ballad of a Soldier (1959) as Old woman truck driver
- Resurrection (1960) as Korablyova
- Farewell, Doves (1960) as Mariya Yefimovna
- Man Follows the Sun (1961) as woman reading a letter
- The Alive and the Dead (1964) as Kulikova
- Tale About the Lost Time (1964) as Avdotya Petrovna
- Three Poplars in Plyushcikha (1967) as Fedosia Ivanovna
- We'll Live Till Monday (1968) as school nurse
- Remember Your Name (1974) as nurse in hospital
- Step Forward (1975) as nurse in hospital
- The Luncheon on the Grass (1979) as cook in pioneer camp

== Awards ==
- Honored Artist of the RSFSR (1961)
- People's Artist of the RSFSR (1974)
