= The Star (1949 film) =

1953 film by Aleksandr Ivanov

- Directed by: Aleksandr Ivanov
- Written by: Pavel Furmanskiy; Emmanuil Kazakevich
- Produced by: Pavel Armand; Iosif Gindin; Aleksandr Ivanov
- Starring: Anatoly Verbitsky; Alexey Pokrovsky; Oleg Zhakov
- Cinematography: Sergei Ivanov; Vladimir Rapoport
- Music by: Venedikt Pushkov
- Production company: Lenfilm
- Release date: 21 September 1953
- Running time: 88 minutes
- Country: Soviet Union
- Language: Russian

The Star (Russian: Звезда, romanized: Zvezda) is a 1949 Soviet war drama film directed by Aleksandr Ivanov and starring Anatoly Verbitsky, Alexey Pokrovsky and Oleg Zhakov. The film was completed in 1949, but was not released for four years. It portrays a group of Soviet soldiers who are cut off and surrounded by German troops during the Second World War.

The film was remade in 2002.

== Plot ==
The command of one of the Soviet divisions becomes aware of the alleged enemy counterattack. The scouts sent to the enemy rear to clarify the data do not return. A new group of seven scouts under the code name The Star led by Lieutenant Travkin are sent. When returning after completing the task the group suddenly is faced with the German detachment. Lieutenant Travkin sends one of the scouts with a report, afterwards he and his comrades enter into a mortal battle with the enemy.

== Cast ==
- Anatoly Verbitsky as Group Commander Lieutenant Travkin
- Alexey Pokrovsky as Political Officer Lieutenant Meshcheryakov
- Irina Radchenko as Kate Simakova
- Lidiya Sukharevskaya as Radio operator Tatiana Ulybysheva
- Oleg Zhakov as Colonel Serbichenko
- Movsoum Sanani as Chief of Staff of the Division / Colonel Aliyev
- Nikolay Kryuchkov as Sgt. Mamochkin
- Vasiliy Merkurev as Anikanov
- Pavel Volkov as Scout
- Vladimir Marev as Scout
- Yu Abikh as Scout Yura Golubovsky
- N. Stepanov as Scout Brazhnikov
- Viktor Kulakov as Head of the Division's Intelligence
- Georgy Satini as Degtyarev captain
- Lev Stepanov as German
- Evgeniy Teterin as German General

== Bibliography ==
- Liehm, Mira; Liehm, Antonín J. (1977). The Most Important Art: Eastern European Film After 1945. University of California Press. ISBN 9780520031579 – via Internet Archive.
