= Beloved Beauty =

1958 feature-length stop motion-animated film

- The Tsar's son and Beloved Beauty
- Directed by: Vladimir Degtyaryov
- Written by: Vladimir Degtyaryov (script); Yevgeniy Speranskiy (script + songs); Mikhail Svetlov (songs)
- Starring: Erast Garin; Georgiy Vitsin; N. Malishevskiy; Irina Mazing; Yuriy Khrzhanovskiy; Nina Gulyayeva; Georgiy Millyar; Leonid Pirogov; Maria Vinogradova; Alexey Pokrovsky
- Edited by: V. Yegorova
- Music by: Yuriy Levitin
- Release date: 1958 (USSR)
- Running time: 46 minutes
- Country: USSR
- Language: Russian

Beloved Beauty (Russian: Краса́ ненагля́дная, Krasa nenaglyadnaya) is a 1958 feature-length stop motion-animated film from the Soviet Union. The film, which was made at the Soyuzmultfilm studio, is based on Russian folk tales.

== Plot ==
Once upon a time, there were a Tsar and his wife, the Tsarina. They also had a son, Prince Ivan-Tsarevich. Everything would have been good if Ivan's parents hadn't come one morning and told him about the 'Beloved Beauty', a beautiful girl about whom the nurses sang. Ivan then began to dream of the 'Beloved Beauty'. One day, he decided to venture into the world to find the Beloved Beauty. Ivan-Tsarevich went, and was accompanied by a robber named Bulat who became a sworn brother on the way. They soon found out that Koschei the Immortal had imprisoned the Beauty with him. Ivan-Tsarevich and Bulat defeated Koschei, and Beloved Beauty and Mar'yushka, Koschei's servant, got out. They were then also brought to the Tsar's chambers, and the Tsar organized two weddings and they lived happily ever after.

== Creators ==
	English	Russian
Director	Vladimir Degtyaryov	Владимир Дегтярёв
Scenario	Vladimir Degtyaryov; Yevgeniy Speranskiy	Владимир Дегтярёв; Евгений Сперанский
Art Directors	Vladimir Danilevich; Vadim Kurchevskiy	Владимир Данилевич; Вадим Курчевский
Animators	Pavel Petrov; Lev Zhdanov; K. Mamonov; D. Melamed; Vyacheslav Shilobreyev	Павел Петров; Лев Жданов; К. Мамонов; Д. Меламед; Вячеслав Шилобреев
Camera Operators	Joseph Golomb; Mikhail Kamentskiy	Иосиф Голомб; Михаил Каменецкий
Executive Producer	Nathan Bitman	Натан Битман
Composer	Yuriy Levitin	Юрий Левитин
Sound Operator	Georgiy Martynyuk	Георгий Мартынюк
Puppets / decorations	Oleg Masainov; V. Kalashnikova; Pavel Lesin; V. Kuranov; Roman Gurov; N. Tselikov; N. Solntsev	Олег Масаинов; В. Калашникова; Павел Лесин; В. Куранов; Роман Гуров; Н. Целиков; Н. Солнцев
Voice Actors	Erast Garin (Tsar); Georgiy Vitsin (Truha); N. Malishevskiy; Irina Mazing; Yuriy Khrzhanovskiy; Nina Gulyayeva; Georgiy Millyar (Koshchey the Immortal); Leonid Pirogov (Kremen); Maria Vinogradova; Alexey Pokrovsky	Эраст Гарин (Царь); Георгий Вицин (Труха); Н. Малишевский; Ирина Мазинг; Юрий Хржановский; Нина Гуляева; Георгий Милляр (Кащей Бессмертный); Леонид Пирогов (Кремень); Мария Виноградова; Алексей Покровский
Editor	V. Yegorova	В. Егорова
Vocal parts	Galina Oleynichenko	Галина Олейниченко
Song lyrics	Yevgeny Speranskiy; Mikhail Svetlov	Евгений Сперанский; Михаил Светлов

== The edition on DVD ==
In 2008 was published in the collection of animated films together with "The Night Before Christmas" on DVD under distribution of the Krupnyy Plan company.

- Sound — the Russian Dolby Digital 2.0 Mono;
- Regional code — 0 (All);
- The image — Standard 4:3 (1,33:1);
- Color — PAL.
- Packing — the Collection edition.

== See also ==
- History of Russian animation
- List of animated feature films
- List of stop-motion films
