= Two on the Steppes =

- Russian: Двое в степи
- Directed by: Anatoly Efros
- Written by: Emmanuil Kazakevich
- Starring: Valeri Babyatinsky; Assu Nurekenov; V. Batalova; Svetlana Konovalova; Evgeniya Presnikova; Konstantin Khudyakov
- Cinematography: Pyotr Yemelyanov
- Music by: Dzhon Ter-Tatevosyan
- Release date: 1964
- Country: Soviet Union
- Language: Russian

Two on the Steppes (Russian: Двое в степи) is a 1964 Soviet war drama film directed by Anatoly Efros.

== Plot ==
The film takes place in the summer of 1942, when on the Don the Soviet army tries to repel the German fascists. In the center of the plot is a young lieutenant Ogarkov, who is sent to the division by order of redeployment. He wanders all night in the steppe and cannot cope with the task, for which he must be shot. Convoy Dzhurabaeva leads him to be shot across the steppe, but they gradually become friends.

== Cast ==
- Valeri Babyatinsky as Ogarkov (as V. Baryatinsky)
- Assu Nurekenov
- V. Batalova
- Svetlana Konovalova
- Evgeniya Presnikova
- Konstantin Khudyakov
- Ivan Kuznetsov
- Dmitriy Masanov
- Anatoliy Verbitskiy
