= Romashin =

Romashin (Russian: Ромашин) is a Russian masculine surname, its feminine counterpart is Romashina. It may refer to

- Anatoli Romashin (1931–2000), Russian film and theater actor and director
- Svetlana Romashina (born 1989), Russian competitor in synchronized swimming
