= Yuriy Kuzmenkov =

- Born: Yuriy Alexandrovich Kuzmenkov; 16 February 1941; Moscow, Russian SFSR, Soviet Union
- Died: 11 September 2011 (aged 70); Moscow, Russia
- Occupation: Actor
- Years active: 1963–2011

Yuriy Alexandrovich Kuzmenkov (Russian: Ю́рий Алекса́ндрович Кузьменко́в; 16 February 1941 – 11 September 2011) was a Soviet-Russian screen and stage actor. He was known for portraying working class and military people. He was awarded the Honored Artist of Russia (1980).

== Early life ==
Kuzmenkov was born and grew up in Moscow. He came from a working-class family. His father was a metal worker and his mother was a hairdresser.

Upon graduating high school, Kuzmenkov went to trade school to become a metal lathe operator. He got work in a factory but found that he enjoyed acting and took part in amateur performances at his workplace. As his passion for acting increased, he went to study at the school-studio of Yuri Zavadsky at the Mossovet Theatre.

== Career ==
After graduation in 1964, he stayed on at the Mossovet as a member of the acting troupe.

Kuzmenkov made his screen debut in 1963 in the Soviet film In the Name of the Revolution. He rose to fame in 1970, with movies such as Taymyr Calls You (1970) and Big School-Break (1972).

== Personal life ==
He married theatre actress Galina Vanuyshkina in 1963. Their son, Stepan, is a diplomat.

He died from a heart attack on 11 September 2011.

== Partial filmography ==
- 1965: Our House as passenger with a suitcase
- 1966: Flying Days as Kuzmenkov, entertainer
- 1967: The Journalist as Kuzmenkov, entertainer
- 1968: Two Comrades Were Serving as soldier
- 1969: By the Lake as train passenger
- 1972: The Love of Mankind as Yuri Alexandrovich Strumilin
- 1973: Big School-Break as Fedoskin
- 1974: Autumn as police sergeant major
- 1976: The Age of Innocence as Alka's father
- 1995: What a Mess! as man with a goat
- 2005: Brezhnev as Nikolai Podgorny
