= At the Beginning of Glorious Days =

- Directed by: Sergey Gerasimov
- Screenplay by: Sergey Gerasimov; Yuri Kavtaradze
- Starring: Dmitri Zolotukhin; Tamara Makarova; Natalya Bondarchuk; Nikolai Yeremenko Jr. Mikhail Nozhkin; Boris Khmelnitsky; Lyubov Germanova; Ivan Lapikov; Lyubov Polekhina; Marina Levtova
- Cinematography: Sergey Filippov, Horst Hardt
- Music by: Vladimir Martynov
- Production company: Gorky Film Studio
- Distributed by: Russian Cinema Council
- Release date: 1980 (USSR)
- Running time: 134 minutes
- Country: Soviet Union
- Language: Russian

At the Beginning of Glorious Days (Russian: В начале славных дел, romanized: V nachale slavnykh del) is the second part of a two-part film that started with The Youth of Peter the Great. Both parts were released in the Soviet Union in 1980 and are based on a novel, Peter I, written by Aleksey Tolstoy. The film was directed by Russian director Sergei Gerasimov. The movie is considered to be a classic of Russian historical cinema.

== Synopsis ==
In late 17th-century Russia, Czar Peter the Great orders an attack on Turkey, which refuses to pay taxes to the Russian government. The Russian military is equipped with outdated technology, and they suffer their first defeat. After the defeat the czar orders the building of a fleet, and sends many educated men to study in Germany, France, and Holland. Russian victory over Turkey will not only force the Turks to pay taxes, but also make the Sea of Azov accessible to the Russians.

== Cast ==
- Dmitri Zolotukhin — Peter the Great
- Tamara Makarova — Natalya Naryshkina
- Aleksandr Belyavskiy — Lev Naryshkin, Peter's uncle
- Natalya Bondarchuk — Czarevna Sophia
- Nikolai Yeremenko Jr. — Aleksandr Danilovich Menshikov
- Mikhail Nozhkin — Knyaz Boris Alexeyevich Galitzine
- Boris Khmelnitsky — Kuzma Chermnyi
- Lyubov Germanova — Eudoxia Lopukhina
- Ivan Lapikov — Zhemov
- Lyubov Polekhina — Sanka Brovkina
- Marina Levtova — Olga Bulnosova
- Yekaterina Vasilyeva — Antonida Bulnosova
- Pyotr Glebov — Gypsy
- Marina Golub — Verka
- Muza Krepkogorskaya — Sparrow caregiver
- Yury Moroz — Alyosha Brovkin
- Peter Reusse — Franz Lefort
- Eduard Bocharov — Merchant Ivan Brovkin
- Anatoli Barantsev — Nikita Zotov
- Roman Filippov — Fyodor Romodanovsky
- Vladimir Kashpur — Ovdokim
- Nikolai Grinko — Starets Nektari
