= Galina Polskikh =

Soviet actress

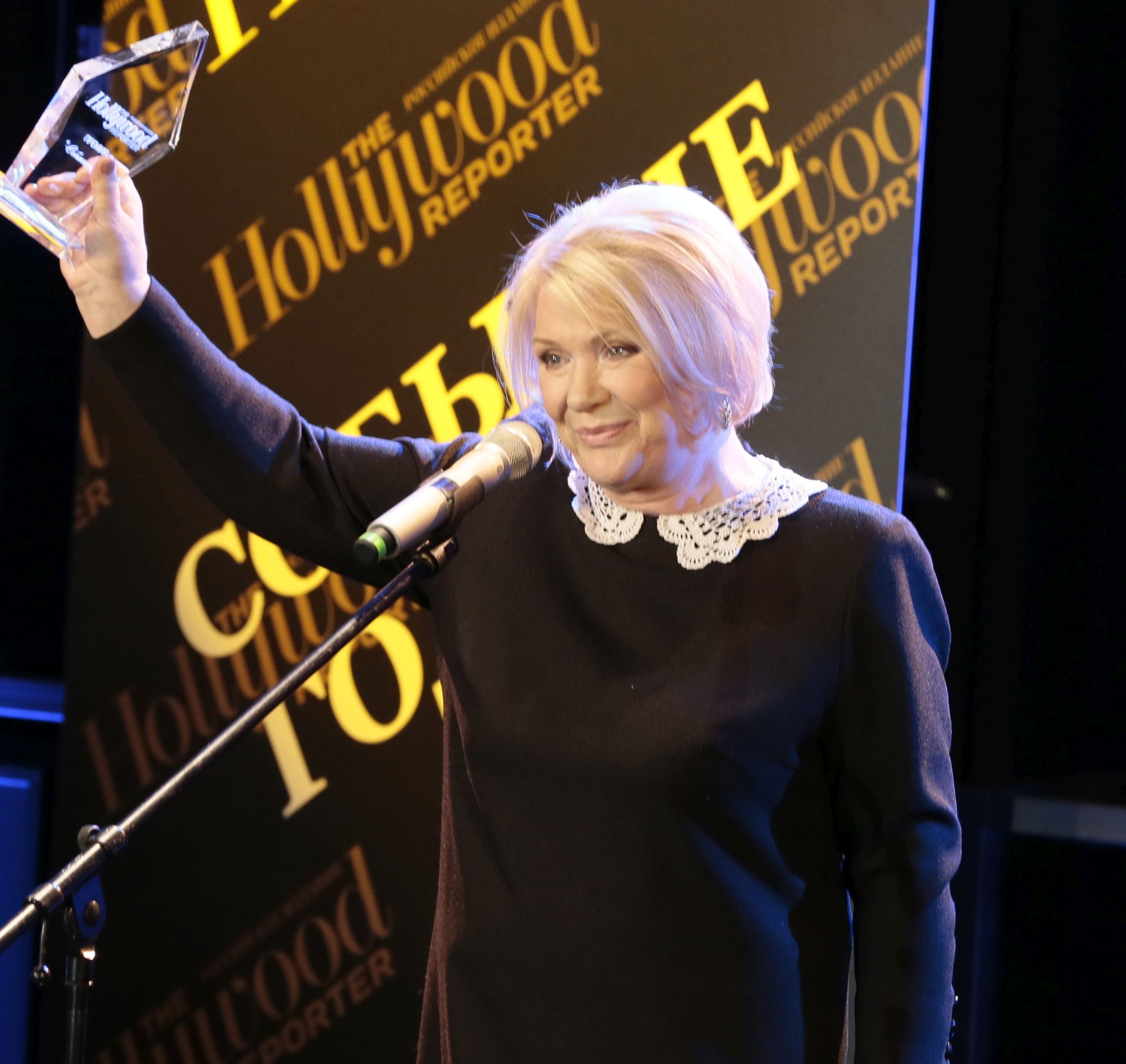
- Born: Galina Aleksandrovna Polskikh; 27 November 1939 (age 86); Moscow, Soviet Union
- Occupation: Actress
- Years active: 1962-present

Galina Aleksandrovna Polskikh (Russian: Гали́на Алекса́ндровна По́льских; born 27 November 1939) is a Soviet and Russian film actress. She has appeared in more than 100 films since 1962. In 1979 she was awarded the title of People's Artist of Russia, and in 1999 Order of Honour (fourth degree). Polskikh became famous after playing lead roles in such Soviet films as Walking the Streets of Moscow (1962), The Journalist (1967) and Expectations (1966).

== Acting career ==
Polskikh was born in Moscow in a poor family. Her father was killed during World War II, and her mother died of typhoid fever several years later. The 8-year-old girl was taken to an orphan asylum where she spent several months before her grandmother, who worked as a janitor, took her to her place. They lived in abject poverty in a small room in a basement floor of a many-storied building. To become a film actress was a cherished dream of a young girl since it was the only chance to tear herself away from destitution. Her dream came true in 1960 when Galina managed to enter All-Union State Institute of Cinematography, the leading film school in the USSR and Russia. Her teacher was Sergei Gerasimov, one of the most prominent and reputable Russian film directors at that time.

Polskikh's film debut took place in 1959 when she played a small role in the film The White Nights. Polskikh became famous after the lead role in The Wild Dingo Dog released in 1962 that dealt with teenager love. Polskih, who was 22 and was already married and had a child, played a 15-year-old high school student. She skillfully portrayed feelings and emotions of a young girl to create a touching female personage.

The lead roles in Walking the Streets of Moscow (1962) and The Journalist (1967) directed by her teacher Sergei Gerasimov made Polskikh one of the most outstanding film stars in the Soviet Union. The distinctive feature of Polskikh's acting was convincing depiction of subtle emotions of female personages in affecting scenes. The films in which she starred reflected very well realities of life in the Soviet Union.

In the 1970s and 1980s the range of actress' roles became wider. She appeared in thrillers, comedies, and patriotic films about the Great Patriotic War. After the disintegration of the USSR in the 1990s the actress continued her career without any noticeable success.

== Selected filmography ==
- The Wild Dog Dingo (Дикая собака Динго, 1962) as Tanya
- I Step Through Moscow (Я шагаю по Москве, 1963) as Alyona
- There Was an Old Couple (Жили-были старик со старухой, 1965) as Galya
- The Journalist (Журналист, 1967) as Shura Okaemova
- Znaki na drodze (Знаки на дороге, 1970) as Jadwiga
- For Family Reasons (По семейным обстоятельствам, 1977) as Galina Arkadievna
- Borrowing Matchsticks (За спичками, 1980) as Kaysa Karchutar
- Fathers and Grandfathers (Отцы и деды, 1982)
- White Dew (Белые Росы, 1983) as Marousia
- Vertical Race (Гонки по вертикали, 1983) as Zosia
- Higher Than Rainbow (Выше радуги, 1986) as Alexandra Ilinichna
- Friend (Друг, 1987) as Eleonora Frantsevna
- A Man from the Boulevard des Capucines (Человек с бульвара Капуцинов, 1987) as Mrs. Thompson
- Bright Personality (Светлая личность, 1988) as Ptashnikova
- Yolki-palki (Ёлки-палки!, 1988) as Klava
- White Nights (Белые ночи, 1992) as Nastya's aunt
- BOOMERang (БУМЕРанг, 2021) as widow

== Honours and awards ==
- People's Artist of RSFSR (1979)
- Order For Merit to the Fatherland, 4th class (1999)
- Vasilyev Brothers State Prize of the RSFSR (1978) for her role in the heroic epic Zina "Front without flanks", "The Front for the front line"
