= Nikolai Yeremenko Jr. =

Russian actor (1949–2001)

- Born: Nikolai Nikolaevich Yeremenko Jr. 14 February 1949; Vitebsk, Byelorussian SSR, Soviet Union (now Belarus)
- Died: 27 May 2001 (aged 52); Moscow, Russia
- Resting place: Eastern Cemetery, Minsk
- Occupations: Actor, film director
- Years active: 1969—2001
- Title: People's Artist of Russia (1994)
- Spouse: Vera Titova
- Awards: Lenin Komsomol Prize (1980)

Nikolai Nikolaevich Yeremenko Jr. (Belarusian: Мікалай Мікалаевіч Яроменка (малодшы), (Russian: Никола́й Никола́евич Ерёменко-мла́дший; 14 February 1949 — 27 May 2001) was a Soviet and Russian theater and film actor, film director of Belarusian origin. He was awarded People's Artist of Russia in 1994.

== Biography ==
Nikolai was born in Vitebsk, in the family of People's Artist of the USSR Nikolai Yeremenko Sr. (1926—2000) and People's Artist of the BSSR Galina Orlova (1928—2021).

In 1967, he entered the VGIK (workshop of Sergey Gerasimov and Tamara Makarova), graduated in 1971 and in the same year was admitted to the troupe of the National Film Actors' Theatre; since 1976 an actor of the Gorky Film Studio.

In cinema, Nikolai Yeremenko made his debut in 1969 acting in the film By the Lake by Gerasimov. According to the results of the annual poll of viewers in the magazine Soviet Screen, Nikolai was recognized as the best actor in 1980 for the role of Sergey Sergeyevich in the film Pirates of the 20th Century.

In the 1990s, Yeremenko decided on the director's debut — Son for Father, where he starred with his father. Since 2001, he was the cultural advisor of the Embassy of Belarus in Moscow.

Nikolai died at the Botkin Hospital in Moscow on 27 May 2001, as a result of a stroke. He was buried on 31 May in Minsk in the Eastern Cemetery, next to his father.

== Personal life ==
He married Vera Titova on 5 May 1975. In this marriage, daughter Olga was born. From a civil marriage with Tatyana Maslennikova, his daughter Tatyana (1990) was born.

== Selected filmography ==
Actor

- By the Lake (1969) as Alexey
- Hot Snow (1973) as Drozdovsky
- The Red and the Black (1976) as Julien Sorel
- 31 June (1978) as Sam Penty, painter
- The Tavern on Pyatnitskaya (1979) as Mikhail Eremin
- Pirates of the 20th Century (1980) as Sergey Sergeyevich
- The Youth of Peter the Great (1980) as Aleksandr Danilovich Menshikov
- At the Beginning of Glorious Days (1980) as Aleksandr Danilovich Menshikov
- Copper Angel (1984) as Sebastien Valdez
- In Search for Captain Grant (1986) as Lord Glenarvan
- Lev Tolstoy (1993) as Aleksandr Goldenweiser
- I Declare War on You (1990) as Erokhin
- White Nights (1992) as tenant
- Trotsky (1993) as Nahum Eitingon
- Empire under Attack (2000) as Vyacheslav von Plehve
- Chivalric Romance (2000) as Nikephoros Bryennios the Younger
- Give Me Moonlight (2001) as Sergei Kupriyanov
- Brigada (2002) as Yuri Rostislavovich, Kosmos' father

Director

- Son for Father (1995)
