= Man and Beast =

Man and Beast may refer to:

- Man and Beast (1963 film), a West German-Yugoslavian war film
- Man and Beast (1917 film), an American silent adventure film

== See also ==
- Men and Beasts, a 1962 Soviet-German drama film
