= Elena Gogoleva =

Soviet and Russian actress (1900–1993)

- Елена Гоголева
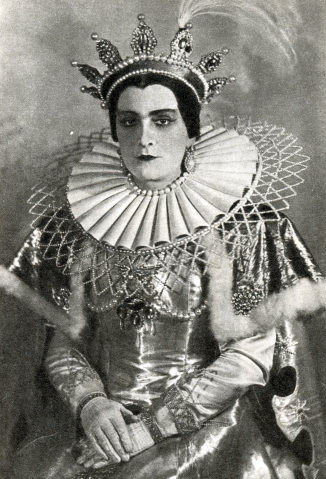
- Gogoleva as Marina Mniszech (1937)
- Born: 7 April, 1900 [O.S. 25 March] Moscow, Russian Empire
- Died: 15 November 1993 (aged 93); Moscow, Russia
- Education: Philharmonic Conservatory
- Occupation: Actress
- Years active: 1918–1993

Elena Nikolayevna Gogoleva (Note: Russian: Елена Николаевна Гоголева, romanized: Yelena Nikolayevna Gogoleva) (7 April, 1900 [O.S. 25 March] – 15 November 1993) was a Soviet and Russian film and stage actress, actress of the Maly Theatre in Moscow from 1918 to 1993. She was a People's Artist of the USSR (1949), Hero of Socialist Labour (1974), and the winner of three Stalin Prizes (1947, 1948, 1949). She joined the Communist Party of the Soviet Union in 1948.

She was born into a military family. Gogoleva's mother was a provincial actress. In 1920, Elena Gogoleva made her debut in cinema, but she did not act in many films, always remaining primarily a theater actress. She also worked on radio and television. More than 150 recordings of literary works and Maly Theater performances with her participation are stored in the collection of the State Television and Radio Fund.

== Filmography ==
- Angelo (1920)
- Gobseck (1936)
- Least We Forget (1954)
- Wings (1956)
- A Glass of Water (1957)
- Two Lives (1961)
- Dostigayev and others (1971)
- The Queen of Spades (1982)

== Awards ==
- Hero of Socialist Labour (1974)
- People's Artist of the USSR (1949)
- Stalin Prize second degree (1947)
- Two Stalin Prizes first degree (1948, 1949)
