= The Wagtail's Army =

- Russian poster
- Russian: Армия «Трясогузки»
- Directed by: Aleksandrs Leimanis
- Written by: Arkadi Mlodik; Aleksandr Vlasov
- Produced by: Marks Cirelsons; Augusts Petersons
- Starring: Viktor Kholmogorov; Yuri Korzhov; Aivars Galviņš; Gunārs Cilinskis; Ivan Kuznetsov
- Cinematography: Māris Rudzītis
- Edited by: Ērika Meškovska
- Music by: Kirill Molchanov
- Production company: Riga Film Studio
- Release date: December 28, 1964
- Running time: 84 min.
- Country: Soviet Union
- Languages: Russian; Latvian

The Wagtail's Army (Russian: Армия «Трясогузки», romanized: Armiya 'Tryasoguzki', Latvian: Cielaviņas armija) is a 1964 Soviet family film directed by Aleksandrs Leimanis. It is an adaptation of the novel of the same name by Alexander Vlasov and Arkady Mlodik.

== Plot ==
The protagonists of this adventure film are a group of homeless boys who decide to assist the Red Army. In a city occupied by the forces of Admiral Kolchak, an uprising is being planned. Suddenly, a train derails, a sabotage operation attributed to a mysterious group calling itself the "Swallow Army." The Kolchak counterintelligence service, furious and desperate, begins a relentless search for the underground conspirators, though without success. Even the Bolsheviks become curious about their enigmatic allies.

It is eventually revealed that the formidable "army" consists of just three homeless boys: a Russian boy nicknamed Swallow, a Latvian named Miki, and a young Romani boy. The film tells the story of how these resourceful and courageous boys aided the Bolsheviks in liberating the city from the White Army forces.

== Cast ==
- Viktor Kholmogorov as Tryasoguzka
- Yuri Korzhov as Gypsy
- Aivars Galviņš as Mika
- Gunārs Cilinskis as Platais (voiced by Artyom Karapetyan)
- Ivan Kuznetsov as Kondrat
- Viktor Plyut as Nikolay
- Aleksey Alekseev as colonel
- Gurgen Tonunts as esaul
- Pavel Shpringfeld as lineman
- Uldis Dumpis as adjutant
- Ivan Lapikov as wounded man

== Sequel ==
On December 23, 1968, the sequel to The Wagtail's Army Again in Battle was released on Soviet screens, also directed by Leimanis.
