= My Love (1940 film) =

- Russian: Моя любовь
- Directed by: Vladimir Korsh-Sablin
- Written by: Iosif Prut
- Starring: Lidiya Smirnova; Ivan Pereverzev; Vladimir Chobur
- Cinematography: David Shlyugleyt
- Edited by: Nadezhda Brilliantshchikova
- Music by: Isaak Dunayevsky
- Production company: Belarusfilm
- Release date: July 8, 1940
- Running time: 80 min.
- Country: Soviet Union
- Language: Russian

My Love (Russian: Моя любовь, romanized: Moya lyubov) is a 1940 Soviet musical comedy film directed by Vladimir Korsh-Sablin.

The film was watched by 19.2 million people at the Soviet box office.

The film tells how the sweet and kind Shura adopts her late sister's son, leading to humorous misunderstandings with her friends and ultimately revealing the truth about imaginary and real feelings.

== Plot ==
Inseparable friends Grisha, Lyosha, and the charming Shura work tirelessly at a factory while attending university in the evenings. Both young men are in love with Shura and decide to confess their feelings to her. Shura chooses Grisha for his confidence and good looks. However, her life takes an unexpected turn when she learns of her twin sister's death. The sister, recently divorced, left behind a young son, Felix, and entrusted Shura to raise him. Shura brings the boy home and, on the advice of a medical professor, pretends that Felix is her own child. Her friends and colleagues are intrigued, with her friend Motya speculating that Felix might be Grisha’s son. Grisha grows frustrated and demands Shura reveal the truth to clear his name, leading to a quarrel between them. In contrast, Lyosha enjoys caring for the child and even confronts Grisha for upsetting Shura.

Shura receives a telegram from her late sister’s ex-husband, also named Alexey, demanding custody of Felix. She meets him at the train station, but Lyosha, having read the telegram, secretly follows her, with Grisha trailing behind. After speaking with Shura, Alexey decides to relinquish his claim on the boy. However, Grisha mistakenly assumes that Lyosha is the father of Felix due to his presence. As gossip spreads, Grisha declares to everyone that Lyosha is the child’s father. Kind-hearted and deeply in love with Shura, Lyosha does not deny the rumor. He follows her to a retreat and proposes marriage. Although Grisha also arrives and attempts to reconcile with Shura, this time she chooses Lyosha.

== Starring ==
- Lidiya Smirnova as Shura
- Ivan Pereverzev as Lyosha
- Vladimir Chobur as Grisha
- Felix Chernousko as Felix
- Maria Klyuchareva as Motya
- Oleg Solyus as Aleksei
- Aleksei Matov as Miron Maksimovich
- Vladimir Shishkin as Venya
- Maria Shlenskaya as grandma
- Naum Sokolov as professor
- Nikolai Trofimov as Misha
