= By the Lake =

- Film poster
- Directed by: Sergei Gerasimov
- Written by: Sergei Gerasimov
- Starring: Oleg Zhakov; Vasily Shukshin; Natalya Belokhvostikova
- Cinematography: Vladimir Rapoport; Vladimir Arkhangelsky
- Music by: Ilya Kataev
- Production company: Gorky Film Studio
- Release date: 1969
- Running time: 184 minutes
- Country: Soviet Union
- Language: Russian

By the Lake (Russian: У озера, romanized: U ozera) is a two-part 1969 Soviet film directed by Sergei Gerasimov. In 1971 the USSR State Prize for this film was awarded to Sergei Gerasimov, cinematographer Vladimir Rapoport, art director Pyotr Galadzhev, and the group of leading actors: Oleg Zhakov, Vasily Shukshin, Natalya Belokhvostikova.

== Plot ==
The film takes place during the first half of the 1960s and is narrated from the perspective of Lena Barmina, the daughter of a scientist. On the shores of Lake Baikal, the construction of a pulp and paper mill is planned, threatening the lake's unique ecosystem. Professor Barmin, a renowned scientist, and his daughter Lena begin a campaign to protect the lake from environmental harm. Barmin and his team staunchly oppose the project, fearing the plant's wastewater will irreparably damage the delicate ecological balance. However, Vasily Chernykh, the plant's director, advocates for building an innovative wastewater treatment system alongside the mill to mitigate environmental harm.

As the story unfolds, Lena experiences her own personal drama when she falls in love with Chernykh, an older, married man. Their complex relationship evolves amidst the backdrop of the ongoing environmental conflict. Lena initially grows closer to Chernykh, but when she learns of his marriage, she decides to end their relationship, prioritizing her principles and future. Meanwhile, Professor Barmin’s unyielding stance against the project takes a toll on his health, culminating in a heart attack that forces him into the hospital.

The character of Professor Barmin was inspired by Mikhail Kozhov, a real-life scientist and expert on the fauna of Lake Baikal, who dedicated his life to studying and preserving the lake's unique ecosystem. The film intertwines themes of environmental activism, personal sacrifice, and the moral complexities of love and duty.

== Cast ==
- Oleg Zhakov as Barmin
- Vasily Shukshin as Chernykh
- Natalya Belokhvostikova as Lena Barmina
- Valentina Telichkina as Valya Korolkova
- Mikhail Nozhkin as Gennady Yakovlev
- Natalya Arinbasarova as Katya Olzoeva
- Nikolai Yeremenko Jr. as Alexey
- Vadim Spiridonov as Konstantin Konovalov
- Yuriy Kuzmenkov as a passenger on a train
- Natalya Bondarchuk as a passenger on a train
- Nina Maslova as a girl in a drama production
