= Masquerade (1941 film) =

- Directed by: Sergei Gerasimov
- Written by: Sergei Gerasimov
- Based on: Masquerade by Mikhail Lermontov
- Starring: Nikolay Mordvinov; Tamara Makarova; Mikhail Sadovsky; Sofiya Magarill
- Cinematography: Vyacheslav Gordanov
- Music by: Venedikt Pushkov
- Release date: 16 September 1941
- Running time: 113 min
- Country: Soviet Union
- Language: Russian

Masquerade (Russian: Маскарад, romanized: Maskarad) is a 1941 Soviet historical drama film directed by Sergei Gerasimov and based on the eponymous play by Mikhail Lermontov. Its release was timed for the centenary of Lermontov's death.

== Plot ==
Yevgeny Arbenin, a gambler, womanizer, and "haughty favorite of fortune," has experienced everything, grown disillusioned with life, and lost his faith in happiness. Believing he has found an ideal of purity and kindness in the young and beautiful Nina, he marries her and begins to lead a quiet, reclusive life. However, his past sins—humiliating, ruining, and trampling others—cannot be forgotten by those he wronged. They are convinced that the devil still resides in his soul.

A tragic twist of fate awakens a fiery jealousy within Arbenin, transforming him from a loving husband into a villain and murderer in just a few days. Consumed by suspicion, he poisons Nina by lacing her ice cream with poison, watching her dying agony with a sense of grim satisfaction, believing he has served justice. However, when he later learns of her innocence, the weight of his guilt drives him to madness. The film poses a haunting question: does divine justice prevail, or is it all the work of cruel fate?

== Cast ==
- Nikolay Mordvinov as Arbenin
- Tamara Makarova as Nina
- Mikhail Sadovsky as Knyaz Zvezdich
- Sofiya Magarill as Baroness Shtral
- Antonin Pankryshev as Kazarin
- Emil Gal as Shprikh
- Sergei Gerasimov as Unknown man
