= The New China =

1950 film

- Directed by: Sergei Gerasimov; Ivan Dukinsky
- Cinematography: Boris Makaseyev; Vladimir Rapoport
- Release date: 1950
- Running time: 105 minute
- Country: Soviet Union
- Language: Russian

The New China, also rendered in English as Liberated China (Russian: Освобождённый Китай, romanized: Osvobozhdyonnyy Kitay), is a 1950 Soviet documentary film directed by Sergei Gerasimov. It was entered into the 1951 Cannes Film Festival, but was excluded from selection as a purely political propaganda film.

== Plot ==
The film chronicles the liberation struggle of the Chinese people, culminating in the proclamation of the People's Republic of China (PRC) on October 1, 1949. It depicts the transformations in the country under the leadership of Mao Zedong following the communist victory, including efforts to eradicate illiteracy, rebuild the economy devastated by years of civil war, and establish a new socialist society.

Significant historical milestones featured in the film include the restoration of industry and agriculture, as well as the signing of the Sino-Soviet Treaty of Friendship, Alliance, and Mutual Assistance in Moscow. These events underscore the close ties between the PRC and the Soviet Union during this pivotal era.
