= She Defends the Motherland =

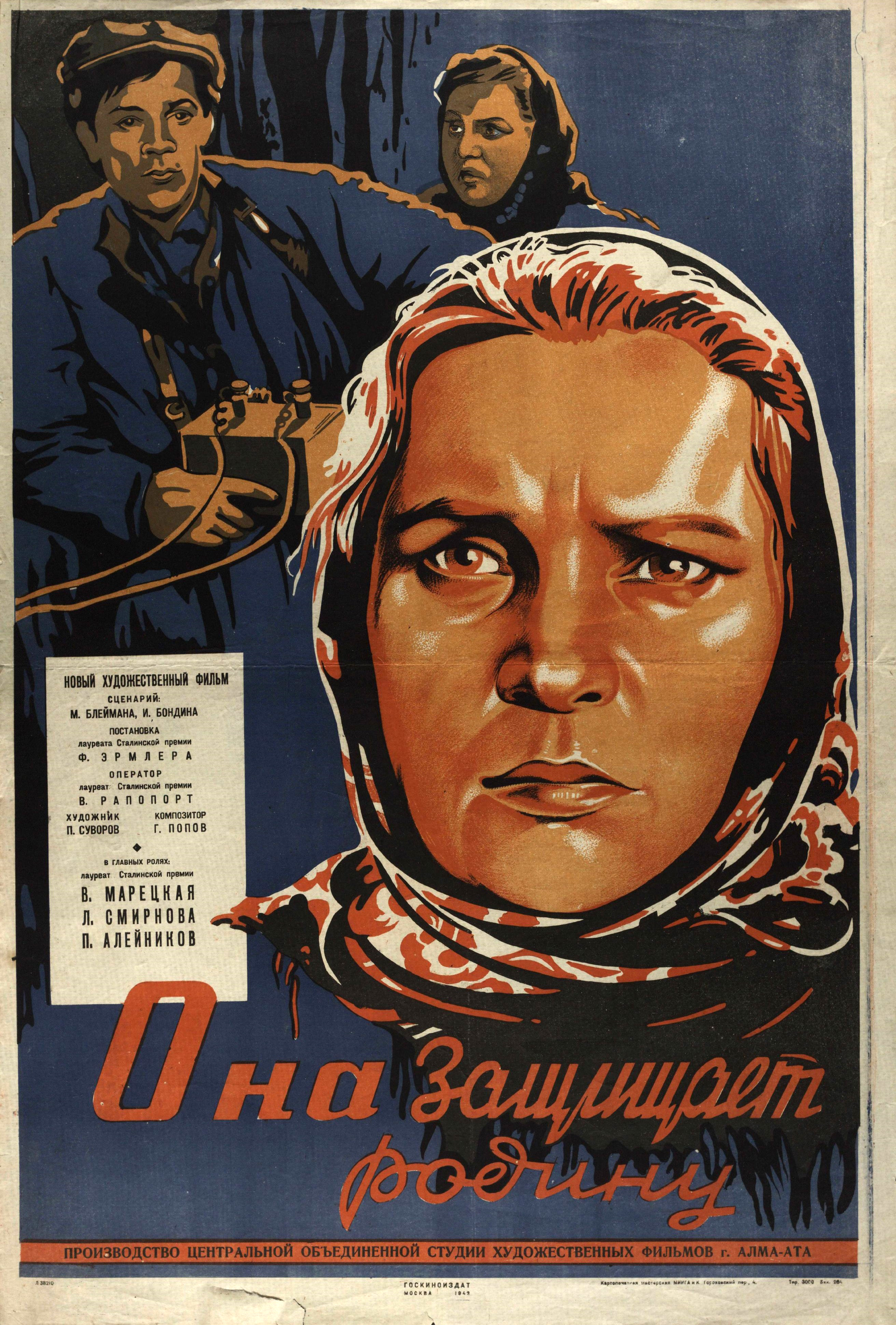
- Russian: Она защищает Родину
- Directed by: Fridrikh Ermler
- Written by: Aleksei Kapler
- Starring: Vera Maretskaya; Nikolay Bogolyubov; Lidiya Smirnova; Pyotr Aleynikov; Ivan Pelttser; Inna Fyodorova; Aleksandr Violinov
- Cinematography: Vladimir Rapoport
- Music by: Gavriil Popov
- Production company: TsOKS
- Release date: May 20, 1943
- Running time: 100 minutes
- Country: Soviet Union

She Defends the Motherland, (Russian: Она защищает Родину) is a 1943 Soviet World War II film starring Vera Maretskaya and directed by Fridrikh Ermler. It was distributed in the United States by Artkino Pictures as No Greater Love, also in 1943, with a dubbed-English soundtrack.

== Plot ==
Praskovya Lukyanova, a rural villager in the USSR, first loses her husband in battle at the outbreak of WWII, and then her only young son, who is run over deliberately by a Nazi tank driven by a soldier wearing an eyepatch, as the Germans take over the village. Thus convicted of the need to fight back, she organizes her fellow villagers in the forest, where they have taken refuge, into a guerilla unit which first thwarts, then overcomes, the fascist invaders.

== Cast ==
- Vera Maretskaya as Praskovya Lukyanova
- Nikolay Bogolyubov as Ivan Lukyanov (as N. Bogolyubov)
- Lidiya Smirnova as Fenya (as L. Smirnova)
- Pyotr Aleynikov as Senya (as P. Alenikov)
- Ivan Pelttser as Stepan Orlov (as I. Peltser)
- Inna Fyodorova as Orlova (as I. Fyodorovna)
- Aleksandr Violinov as Nikolai Nikolayevich (as A. Violinov)
- ? as General Von Falk
- ? as The One-Eyed German Tankist
