= Ivan Stepanov =

- Born: 17 March 1887; Russian Empire
- Died: 30 June 1953 (aged 66); Soviet Union
- Other name: Ivan Grigorevich Stepanov
- Occupation: Art director
- Years active: 1925-1952 (film)

Ivan Stepanov (1887–1953) was a Soviet art director.

== Selected filmography ==
- The Stationmaster (1925)
- The Nightingale (1936)
- The Childhood of Maxim Gorky (1938)
- In the Rear of the Enemy (1941)
- The Ural Front (1944)
- The Young Guard (1948)

== Bibliography ==
- Léon Barsacq. Le décor de film, 1895-1969. H. Veyrier, 1985.
