= They Have a Motherland =

- Russian: У них есть Родина
- Directed by: Aleksandr Faintsimmer; Vladimir Legoshin
- Written by: Sergey Mikhalkov
- Starring: Natasha Zashchipina; Lyonya Kotov; Pavel Kadochnikov; Vera Maretskaya; Vsevolod Sanayev
- Cinematography: Aleksandr Gintsburg
- Music by: Aram Khachaturian
- Release date: 1949
- Running time: 83 minutes
- Country: Soviet Union
- Language: Russian

They Have a Motherland (Russian: У них есть Родина) is a 1949 Soviet World War II film directed by Aleksandr Faintsimmer and Vladimir Legoshin. It is based on a play by Sergey Mikhalkov.

== Plot ==
The film tells about the representatives of Soviet intelligence, who are trying to find in West Germany an orphanage with Soviet children, which is under the supervision of British intelligence.

== Cast ==
- Natasha Zashchipina as Ira Sokolova
- Lyonya Kotov as Sasha Butuzov
- Pavel Kadochnikov as lieutenant colonel Aleksey Petrovich Dobrynin
- Vera Maretskaya as Sasha's mother
- Vsevolod Sanayev as major Vsevolod Vasilyevich Sorokin
- Lidiya Smirnova as orphanage teacher Smayda
- Gennady Yudin as chauffeur Kurt
- Faina Ranevskaya as café owner frau Vurst
- Vladimir Solovyov as Upmanis
- Mikhail Astangov as orphanage chief captain Robert Scott
- Viktor Stanitsyn as colonel Barkley
- Aleksandr Khokhlov as Cook
- Vergily Renin as captain Johnson
- Yudif Glizer as journalist Dodge
