= Seven Brave Men =

- Russian: Семеро смелых
- Directed by: Sergey Gerasimov
- Written by: Sergey Gerasimov; Yuri German
- Starring: Nikolay Bogolyubov; Tamara Makarova; Ivan Novoseltsev; Oleg Zhakov; Pyotr Aleynikov; Andrei Apsolon; Ivan Kuznetsov
- Cinematography: Yevgeni Velichko
- Music by: Venedikt Pushkov
- Release date: 1936
- Running time: 92 minute
- Country: Soviet Union
- Language: Russian

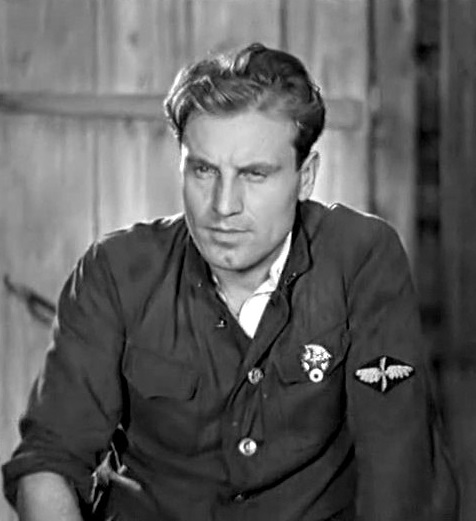
Ivan Novoseltsev in the film "Seven Brave Men"

Seven Brave Men (Russian: Семеро смелых) is a 1936 Soviet action drama film directed by Sergey Gerasimov.

The film tells the story of six researchers who visit the Arctic. When they unpack the cargo, they find another man - Petr Moliboga, with whom they will have to survive the winter.

== Plot ==
The film is inspired by historical events surrounding the Soviet exploration of the Franz Josef Land archipelago in the Arctic. Set in the 1930s, it follows six young Komsomol members who volunteer for a winter expedition in the remote "Joyful Bay." Upon arriving, they discover a stowaway, Petya Moliboga, who joins their ranks, making them seven. The group endures harsh Arctic conditions, showcasing their resilience and camaraderie.

The story draws from the real establishment of the USSR's first permanent polar station, Tikhaya Bay, on Hooker Island in 1929. This station was staffed by seven pioneers who raised the Soviet flag and transmitted the first radiogram to the mainland. The film dramatizes these events, adapting them to align with the Komsomol's ideals and placing them in a slightly later timeline. Despite some creative liberties, the film reflects the spirit of Soviet polar exploration and the bravery of its participants.

== Cast ==
- Nikolay Bogolyubov as Capt. Ilya Letnikov (as N. Bogolyubov)
- Tamara Makarova as Dr. Zhenya Okhrimenko
- Ivan Novoseltsev as Bogun (pilot) (as I. Novoseltsev)
- Oleg Zhakov as Kurt Shefer (radioman) (as O. Zhakov)
- Pyotr Aleynikov as Moliboga (stowaway / cook) (as P. Aleinikov)
- Andrei Apsolon as Osya Korfunkel (meteorologist) (as A. Apsolon)
- Ivan Kuznetsov as Sasha Rybnikov (as I. Kuznetsov)
