= Least We Forget =

- Russian: Об этом забывать нельзя
- Directed by: Leonid Lukov
- Written by: Leonid Lukov; Dmitro Pavlychko; Yakov Smolyak
- Starring: Sergey Bondarchuk; Lidiya Smirnova; Olga Zhizneva; Yelena Gogoleva; Nikolai Plotnikov; Aleksandr Khvylya
- Cinematography: Vladimir Rapoport
- Music by: Matvei Blanter
- Production company: Gorky Film Studio
- Release date: 1954
- Running time: 108 min.
- Country: Soviet Union
- Language: Russian

Least We Forget (Russian: Об этом забывать нельзя, romanized: Ob etom zabyvat nelzya) is a 1954 Soviet film directed by Leonid Lukov.

== Plot ==
The film is based on the real life story of Yaroslav Galan.

The film tells about the confrontation of Garmash, a famous writer, poet and active propagandist of the Soviet government, in Western Ukraine with an organized criminal group that defends and promotes the interests of the West and would kill Garmash if they cannot otherwise silence him.

== Cast ==
- Sergey Bondarchuk as Aleksandr Yakovlevich Garmash
- Lidiya Smirnova as Anna Dashenko
- Olga Zhiznyeva as Yevdokina Sergeyevna Garmash
- Yelena Gogoleva as Mariya Spiridonovna Bantysh
- Nikolai Plotnikov as Vsevolod Yevgenevich Yarchuk
- Aleksandr Khvylya as Leonid Gavrilovich Korshun
- Valentina Ushakova as Galina Korshun
- Vyacheslav Tikhonov as Rostislav Dankovich
- Nikolay Kryuchkov as Rodion Yegorov
- Vera Orlova as Glasha
- Boris Tenin as Maryan Maksimovich, investigator
- Georgi Yumatov as a student
