= Rudin (film) =

1977 Soviet film

- Russian: Рудин
- Directed by: Konstantin Voinov
- Written by: Ivan Turgenev; Nikolai Figurovsky; Konstantin Voinov
- Starring: Oleg Yefremov; Armen Dzhigarkhanyan; Svetlana Pereladova; Lidiya Smirnova; Rolan Bykov
- Cinematography: Mikhail Agranovich; Vladimir Zakharchuk
- Edited by: Ekaterina Karpova
- Music by: Andrey Eshpay
- Release date: 1977
- Country: Soviet Union
- Language: Russian

Rudin (Russian: Рудин) is a 1977 Soviet romance film directed by Konstantin Voinov. It is based on the novel Rudin by Ivan Turgenev.

== Plot ==
The rich landowner Daria Mikhailovna Lasunskaya organizes a salon in which people are waiting a well-read baron and philosopher, but instead comes Dmitry Rudin, who delivers an article at the request of the baron. People warmly receive Rudin. Daria likes him too. He spends two months in the house, but the problem is that despite his intelligence, he is a very cold person.

== Cast ==
- Oleg Yefremov
- Armen Dzhigarkhanyan
- Svetlana Pereladova
- Lidiya Smirnova
- Rolan Bykov
- Oleg Vidov
- Zhanna Bolotova
- Vladimir Sokolov
- Vladimir Korenev
- Lyudmila Shagalova
