= The New Teacher =

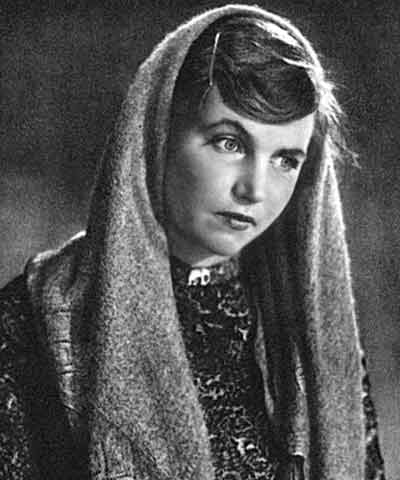
- Russian: Учитель
- Directed by: Sergei Gerasimov
- Written by: Sergey Gerasimov
- Produced by: E. Gal; Grigory Sarkisov
- Starring: Boris Chirkov; Tamara Makarova; Lyudmila Shabalina; Pavel Volkov; Valentina Telegina
- Cinematography: Vladimir Yakovlev
- Music by: Venedikt Pushkov
- Production company: Lenfilm
- Release date: 1939
- Running time: 103 min.
- Country: Soviet Union
- Language: Russian

The New Teacher (Russian: Учитель, romanized: Uchitel) is a 1939 Soviet comedy drama film directed by Sergey Gerasimov.

== Plot ==
A young specialist, Stepan Ivanovich Lautin (played by Boris Chirkov), returns to his hometown after completing his studies in Moscow with plans to build a new school in the village. This news excites everyone except Lautin's father (played by Pavel Volkov), the chairman of the local kolkhoz. The elder Lautin believes his son failed to achieve success in the capital and returned home in disgrace.

The storyline explores a generational conflict alongside the film’s romantic subplot. Stepan’s arrival stirs emotions in his young neighbor, Agrafena Shumilina (played by Tamara Makarova). Seeing that Stepan frequently sends letters, Agrafena assumes he has a romantic interest in the city. Aspiring to match his level, she decides to leave the village to pursue an education.

== Cast ==
- Boris Chirkov as Stepan Ivanovich Lautin
- Tamara Makarova as Agrafena Grunya Shumilina
- Lyudmila Shabalina as Mariya Ivanovna Lautina
- Pavel Volkov as Ivan Fedorovich Lautin
- Valentina Telegina as Stepanida Ivanovna Lautina
- Vera Pomerants as Praskoviya Vasilyevna Lautina
- Ivan Nazarov as Semyon Dimitrivich
- Mikhail Yekaterininsky as Dist. Chm. Aleksandr Sergeyevich Remizov
- Nikolay Sunozov as Konstantin Alexeyvich Khudyakov
- Aleksandra Matveeva as Nastya

== Awards ==
- USSR State Prize II degree (Sergei Gerasimov; Tamara Makarova)
