= Komsomolsk (film) =

- Directed by: Sergei Gerasimov
- Written by: Sergei Gerasimov; Zinoviya Markina; Mikhail Vitukhnovsky
- Cinematography: Aleksandr Gintsburg; Aleksandr Zavyalov
- Production company: Lenfilm Studio
- Release date: 1 May 1938
- Country: Soviet Union
- Language: Russian

Komsomolsk or The Frozen North (also known a City of Youth) is a 1938 Soviet drama film directed by Sergei Gerasimov. Made by Lenfilm, it is a propaganda work set against the backdrop of the construction of the new city of Komsomolsk. Although the film portrays this as the work of the Young Communist volunteers, it was in reality built largely by Gulag prisoners.

== Plot ==
The year is 1932, and the Soviet state is developing at an exceptionally rapid pace. Numerous young men and women, who have joined the Komsomol, travel to the Amur region to build a new, vibrant city named in honor of their organization. However, not everyone shares the enthusiasm for strenuous labor based on unconditional trust into authorities. Among them is a saboteur determined to disrupt the construction plans.

== Cast ==
- Pyotr Aleynikov as Pyotr
- Sergei Gerasimov
- Yevgeniya Golynchik as Cossack Woman
- Bari Haydarov as Kilia
- Leonid Kmit
- Stepan Krylov as Subotin
- Nikolay Kryuchkov as Andrei Sazanov
- Viktor Kulakov as Chekanov
- Ivan Kuznetsov as Butsenko
- Tamara Makarova as Natasha Solovyeva
- Aleksandra Matveeva as Klavka
- Zula Nakhashkiyev as Kilia's Father
- Ivan Novoseltsev as Vladimir Solovyev
- A. Polibin as Organizer of Construction
- G. Shenov as Mavrin
- Valentina Telegina as Motya
- Pavel Volkov as Stepan Nikitich
- Georgi Zhzhyonov

== Western reception ==
The movie played at the Cameo in New York City. The New York Times reported: "The story itself, in detail, is as bewildering as the Siberian night. This observer uncertainly believes that it has something to do with a young wife who joins her recalcitrant husband at Komsomolsk, quarrels with him, works in the kitchen, bears a child, and eventually captures the inevitable saboteurs. Who the latter are and why, goodness only knows! The only certainty is that the power plant gets build, the ship launched (What ship? Don't ask) and the husband and wife are reunited."

== Bibliography ==
- Anna M. Cienciala, Wojciech Materski & N. S. Lebedeva. Katyn: A Crime Without Punishment. Yale University Press, 2008.
