= Great Mourning =

1953 Soviet documentary film

- Russian: Великое прощание
- Directed by: Grigori Aleksandrov; Mikheil Chiaureli; Sergey Gerasimov; Ilya Kopalin; Irina Setkina; Elizaveta Svilova
- Starring: Joseph Stalin
- Music by: Aram Khachaturian
- Release date: 1953
- Running time: 73 minute
- Country: Soviet Union
- Language: Russian

Great Mourning (Russian: Великое прощание) is a 1953 Soviet documentary film.

== Plot ==
The film tells about the funeral arrangements associated with the death of Joseph Stalin.

== Starring ==
- Joseph Stalin as himself
- Lavrentiy Beria as himself
- Georgy Malenkov as himself
- Vyacheslav Molotov as himself
