= Village Detective =

- Directed by: Ivan Lukinsky
- Written by: Vil Lipatov; Irina Mazuruk
- Produced by: Mikhail Kapustin
- Starring: Mikhail Zharov; Tatyana Pelttser; Natalya Sayko; Lidiya Smirnova
- Cinematography: Anatoly Buravchikov; Igor Klebanov; Vladimir Rapoport
- Edited by: Ksenia Blinova
- Music by: Anatoly Lepin
- Production company: Gorky Film Studio
- Release date: March 15, 1969
- Running time: 87 minutes
- Country: Soviet Union
- Language: Russian

Village Detective (Russian: Деревенский детектив, romanized: Derevensky detektiv) is a 1969 Soviet crime comedy film directed by Ivan Lukinsky and based on the novella of the same name by Vil Lipatov. Lyrical detective lives of rural local policeman Aniskin.

Later on the screens came two sequels: Aniskin and Fantomas (1973) and Aniskin Again (1978).

The film tells the story of a rural policeman who employs wit and community insight to solve the theft of an accordion, uncovering a tangled web of jealousy, mischief, and romance in a quiet village.

== Plot ==
The plot centers on Gennady Nikolayevich Pazdnikov, the head of a rural cultural club, whose expensive accordion is stolen. Solving this significant crime, the most notable in the village since 1948, falls to the local policeman, Aniskin. After inspecting the crime scene and speaking with Pazdnikov, Aniskin learns that on the evening before the theft, Pazdnikov had spent time with Evdokiya Pronina, the shopkeeper of the village store. Suspicion initially falls on Pazdnikov’s romantic rival, Grigory Storozhevoy, as both men are vying for Pronina’s affections. Aniskin speaks with Grigory and Evdokiya but refrains from drawing any immediate conclusions. Later that evening, Aniskin encounters the Pankov brothers, known troublemakers, loitering near the club. That night, Aniskin and Pazdnikov conduct an experiment on the outskirts of the village, hoping to lure the thief into revealing themselves by tempting them to play the stolen accordion. This clever tactic leads Aniskin to deduce where the instrument might be hidden and clears Grigory of suspicion.

Aniskin ultimately realizes that the accordion was stolen by the Pankov brothers. They intended to frame Storozhevoy, who had previously clashed with the unruly siblings, knowing he would likely be the first suspect. Instead of formally prosecuting the brothers, Aniskin warns them that if they continue causing trouble, he will ensure they face justice. He confides the truth only to their mother, Praskovya Pankova, while publicly claiming to have found the instrument abandoned in the forest. Meanwhile, Aniskin takes it upon himself to address Evdokiya Pronina’s romantic prospects. He arranges a meeting between her and Storozhevoy, which ends with the two leaving together, suggesting a potential resolution to their romantic entanglements.

== Cast ==
- Mikhail Zharov as Fyodor Ivanovich Aniskin, rural district and a police lieutenant
- Tatyana Pelttser as Glafira Aniskina, his wife
- Natalya Sayko as Zina Aniskina, their daughter
- Lidiya Smirnova as Yevdokia Mironovna Pronina, rural shop clerk
- Roman Tkachuk as Gennady Pozdnyakov, head of the club
- Nikolay Skorobogatov as Ivan Ivanovich, chairman of the kolkhoz
- Georgy Slabinyak as Vitaly Pankov
- Anatoly Kubatsky as Ivan, an old farmer
- Vladislav Balandin as Rafail
- Yuri Chernov as balalaika player Stepan
- Irina Zarubina as milkmaid Praskovya Pankova
- Maria Vinogradova as strict mother

== Awards ==
The film won the award for Best Comedy at the All-Union Film Festival in Minsk.
