= Dark Is the Night (1945 film) =

- Directed by: Boris Barnet
- Written by: Fyodor Knorre
- Starring: Irina Radchenko; Boris Andreyev; Ivan Kuznetsov; Aleksei Yudin
- Cinematography: Sarkis Gevorkyan
- Music by: David Blok
- Production company: Yerevan Film Studio
- Release date: 1 May 1945
- Running time: 1h 13min
- Country: Soviet Union
- Language: Russian

Dark Is the Night (Russian: Однажды ночью, romanized: Odnazhdy nochyu) is a 1945 Soviet World War II film directed by Boris Barnet.

== Plot ==
The film is set during the Great Patriotic War. At night a burning plane crashes on the ruins of an occupied city. The surviving Soviet pilots, among whom are some who are seriously injured, hide from the Nazi persecution. To help them comes a very young Varya, who hides them in her attic. Having lost her mother and sister, she works as a cleaner in the German headquarters. Unbeknownst to the watchmen, she provides the pilots with food and medicine. She is happy about the fact that now there is someone to talk to and someone to help. But the Nazis manage to find out Varya's secret. Having had time to warn the pilots, Varya sacrifices her life in order to save them.

== Cast ==
- Irina Radchenko as Varya
- Boris Andreyev as pilot Khristoforov
- Ivan Kuznetsov as Vyatkin, pilot / Artankin
- Aleksei Yudin as Belugin, school principal / Feldwebel
- V. Leonov as Veselovskiy, grandfather
- B. Vyazemskiy as Dr. Orlov
- Olga Goreva as elderly woman Ulyana
- Nikolai Dupak as pilot Sannikov
- Boris Barnet as German commander Colonel Belts
