= Valentin Chernykh =

Russian screenwriter

- Born: Valentin Konstantinovich Chernykh; 12 March 1935; Pskov, RSFSR, Soviet Union
- Died: 6 August 2012 (aged 77); Moscow, Russia
- Occupations: Screenwriter, playwright, director
- Years active: 1963–2012

Valentin Konstantinovich Chernykh (Russian: Валенти́н Константи́нович Черны́х; 12 March 1935 – 6 August 2012) was a Soviet and Russian screenwriter, playwright and director. He wrote for more than 35 films between 1972 and 2011. He was the Head of the Jury at the 27th Moscow International Film Festival.

== Filmography ==
- A Man at His Place (1972)
- Earthly Love (1974)
- Moscow Does Not Believe in Tears (1979)
- Taste of Bread (1979)
- To Marry a Captain (1985)
- Team 33 (1987)
- Love with Privileges (1989)
- I Declare War on You (1990)
- Tests for Real Men (1998)
- Women's Property (1999)
- Children of the Arbat (2004)
- Our Own (2004)
- Brezhnev (2005)

== Honors and awards ==
- USSR State Prize (1980) – for screenplay to the multiple-part film Taste of Bread (1979)
- Honored Art Worker of the RSFSR (1980)
- Order of the Red Banner of Labour (1985) – for services in development of the Soviet cinema and in connection with 50th birthday
- Order of Friendship (2010) – for services in development of national culture and art, many years of fruitful work
