= I Declare War on You =

- Russian: Я объявляю вам войну
- Directed by: Yaropolk Lapshin
- Written by: Valentin Chernykh
- Starring: Nikolai Badyev; Igor Bityutskiy; Nikolai Yeremenko Jr.; Oleg Korchikov; Dmitri Nalivaichuk
- Cinematography: Rudolf Meshcheryagin
- Music by: Vadim Bibergan
- Release date: 1990
- Country: Soviet Union
- Language: Russian

I Declare War on You (Russian: Я объявляю вам войну) is a 1990 Soviet crime drama film directed by Yaropolk Lapshin.

The film tells about a man who, after long and grueling battles in Cuba and Afghanistan, returns to his hometown to do quiet work, however, circumstances force him to return to his military experience.

== Plot ==
The story is set during the Perestroika period. After his discharge from the army, where he served in Cuba, Afghanistan, Africa, and other conflict zones, retired Lieutenant Colonel Vladimir Yerokhin (played by Nikolai Yeremenko Jr.) returns to his hometown of Krasnogorsk with hopes of leading a peaceful life. However, the state of corruption in his hometown forces him to rely once again on his extensive military experience.

The city is plagued by corruption, with a gang led by a man named Foma (Gennady Saifulin) extorting nearly all local businesses and cooperatives. The police, including Yerokhin’s former classmate Vorotnikov (Oleg Korchikov), are powerless against Foma and his gang, unable to catch them in the act. On his first day back, Yerokhin is attacked by Foma’s thugs when they show up to collect protection money at the cafe run by his friend Tamara (Elena Tonunts). Undeterred, Yerokhin tracks down one of the gang members and seizes his gun. Foma attempts to intimidate Yerokhin by demanding he leave the city, but Yerokhin instead offers Foma the same ultimatum. This marks the beginning of Yerokhin’s personal war against the gang.

== Cast ==
- Nikolai Badyev
- Igor Bityutskiy
- Nikolai Yeremenko Jr. as Erokhin
- Oleg Korchikov as Vorotnikov
- Dmitri Nalivaichuk
- Anzhelika Nevolina as Anya
- Natalya Potapova as Hotel manager
- Gennady Sayfulin as Foma
- Nikolai Sektimenko as Erokhin's friend
- Aleksey Shemes
