= Yuri Vasilyev =

Soviet and Russian actor

Yury Vasilyev
- Юрий Васильев
- Born: Yury Nikolayevich Vasilyev; 12 October 1939; Moscow, USSR
- Died: 4 June 1999 (aged 59); Moscow, Russia
- Occupation: actor
- Years active: 1960–1999
- Spouse: Nelly Korniyenko
- Awards: People's Artist of the Russian Federation (1999)

Yury Nikolayevich Vasilyev (Russian: Ю́рий Никола́евич Васи́льев; October 12, 1939 — June 4, 1999) was a Soviet and Russian stage and film actor. He is best known for film roles in The Journalist (1967) and Moscow Does Not Believe in Tears (1980). He was considered a sex symbol of Soviet cinema.

== Selected filmography ==
- Washington's Story (1960) as Buddy Brooks
- The Journalist (1967) as Yuri Aliabiev
- Fathers and Sons (1974) as Arkady
- Die Fledermaus (1979) as Prince Orlovsky
- Moscow Does Not Believe in Tears (1980) as Rodion Rachkov
- We Are from Jazz (1983) as jazz band leader
- Valentin and Valentina (1985) as Slava
