= Sofya Khalyutina =

Russian and Soviet actress

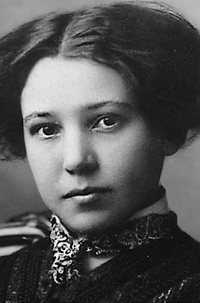
- Born: Sofya Vasilyevna Khalyutina; 22 January 1875; Moscow, Russian Empire
- Died: 10 March 1960 (aged 85); Moscow, Soviet Union
- Occupations: Actress, pedagogue

Sofya Vasilyevna Khalyutina (Russian: Софья Васильевна Халютина, 22 January 1875 – 10 March 1960) was a Russian and Soviet actress, associated with Moscow Art Theatre which she started to perform at in 1898, officially joined in 1901 and spent half a century with.

"The MAT's perpetual teenager in the course of its first decade" (according to Yuri Sobolev), Khalyutina's most memorable parts were Anyutka (The Power of Darkness, Leo Tolstoy, 1902), Dunyasha (The Cherry Orchard by Anton Chekhov, 1904), Tiltil (The Blue Bird by Maeterlinck, 1908), Nastya (The Lower Depths by Maxim Gorky, 1916).

In 1907–1908 Khalyutina read drama in the Adashev Drama School. In 1909 she launched her own theatre college where she was a stage director, reader of drama and manager. It attracted several respected tutors, including Vakhtangov, and lasted till 1914.

After 1917 Khalyutina stayed with MAT and enjoyed more success with Isabella in Valentin Kataev's The Embezzlers (1927), Charlotte (The Cherry Orchard, 1928), Amalia (Fear, Alexander Afinogenov, 1933), Gornostayeva (Lyubov Yarovaya, Konstantin Trenyov, 1936). She was also cast in three films, Andrey Toboltsev (1915), The Ural Front (1944) and Guilty Without Guilt (1945). Khalyutina retired from stage in 1950. She died in Moscow on 10 March 1960.
