= The Ural Front =

- Directed by: Sergey Gerasimov
- Written by: Sergey Gerasimov
- Starring: Tamara Makarova; Viktor Dobrovolsky; Sofya Khalyutina
- Cinematography: Vladimir Yakovlev
- Production company: Mosfilm
- Distributed by: Artkino Pictures (US)
- Release date: August 5, 1944
- Running time: 83 minutes
- Country: Soviet Union
- Language: Russian

The Ural Front (Russian: Большая земля, romanized: Bolshaya zemlya) is a 1944 Soviet World War II film directed by Sergey Gerasimov and starring Tamara Makarova, Viktor Dobrovolsky and Sofya Khalyutina.

The film's sets were designed by the art director Ivan Stepanov. It was distributed in the United States in 1945 by Artkino Pictures.

== Plot ==
The picture begins in August 1941, during the Great Patriotic War. In one town of the Urals, women accompany their husbands to the war. Now they are alone and have to cope with chores by themselves. Anna, the protagonist of the film, displays strong will and organizational skills which are needed.

Industry is evacuated to the Urals, along with equipment, and people come from places where the fighting is underway or could begin soon. These people have become refugees and they need shelter. Anna takes into her house a family - a woman with children and others also follow suit.

== Cast ==
- Tamara Makarova as Anna Sviridova
- Viktor Dobrovolsky as Anikeyev
- Sofya Khalyutina as Maria Gavrilovna
- Vladimir Solovyov as Yegor Sviridov
- Sergei Blinnikov as Prikhodko
- Georgi Kovrov as Chernykh
- Mark Bernes as Kozyrev
- Pyotr Aleynikov as Kostya Korotkov
- Vera Altayskaya as Antonina Ushakova
- Nikolai Konovalov as Kurochkin

== Bibliography ==
- Geoffrey Nowell-Smith. The Oxford History of World Cinema. Oxford University Press, 1996.
