= True Friends (film) =

1954 film

- French film poster
- Directed by: Mikhail Kalatozov
- Written by: Alexander Galich, Konstantin Isaev
- Produced by: Viktor Tsirgiladze
- Starring: Vasili Merkuryev; Boris Chirkov; Aleksandr Borisov; Alexey Gribov
- Cinematography: Mark Magidson
- Edited by: Maria Timofeyeva
- Music by: Tikhon Khrennikov
- Production company: Mosfilm
- Release date: 20 April 1954
- Running time: 102 minutes
- Country: Soviet Union
- Language: Russian

External image
- 1954 Soviet poster of True Friends

True Friends (Russian: Верные друзья, romanized: Vernye druz'ya) is a 1954 Soviet adventure comedy-drama film directed by Mikhail Kalatozov.

The film tells the story of Alexander, Boris, and Vasily, three old friends who now barely see each other as they are busy with their professional lives. They embark on a long-planned voyage on a raft down the Yauza river, which turns into a series of comical accidents but also strengthens their friendship.

== Plot ==
Once, on the outskirts of Moscow, three young friends—Sashka, Borya, and Vaska—dreamed of adventure. While drifting on an old boat along the Yauza River, they fantasized about journeying down a great river and made a pact to reunite someday to fulfill their dream.

Thirty years later, Boris Petrovich Chizhov has become a renowned neurosurgery professor, Alexander Fyodorovich Lapin is a doctor of biological sciences and the director of an Experimental Institute of Animal Husbandry, and Vasily Vasilyevich Nestratov is an academician of architecture. Remembering their childhood promise, Lapin gathers his old friends, and together, they embark on a journey down a great river on a wooden raft.

During their journey, the loyal friends experience numerous adventures. For Lapin, the trip brings happiness as he reunites with a long-lost love. Chizhov showcases his surgical brilliance, performing a life-saving craniocerebral operation on an injured girl at a local hospital. As for Nestratov, the journey transforms his outlook on life, humbling his bureaucratic arrogance and bringing him closer to his roots.

== Cast ==
- Vasili Merkuryev as Vasili Nestratov
- Boris Chirkov as Boris Chizhov
- Aleksandr Borisov as Alexander Lapin
- Alexey Gribov as Nekhoda
- Liliya Gritsenko as Natalya Sergeyevna
- Lyudmila Shagalova as Katya
- Alexey Pokrovsky as junior lieutenant
- Lyudmila Genika-Chirkova as Masha
- Mikhail Pugovkin as club entertainer
- Nikolay Smorchkov as Alexey Mazaev
- Yuri Sarantsev as Sergey

== Production ==
True Friends was made in the aftermath of the death of Joseph Stalin, when political control over Soviet cinema relaxed considerably. Josephin Woll wrote that "his death liberated director Kalatozov... True Friends was his first Thaw project". Its script was submitted for approval in 1952, but it was only authorized for filming after Stalin's death.

== Reception ==
With 30.9 million tickets sold, True Friends was the seventh highest-grossing Soviet film of 1954. Together with Salt of the Earth, it was ex aequo awarded the Crystal Globe in the 1954 Karlovy Vary International Film Festival.

The New York Times critic wrote that the film "makes for a surprisingly relaxed and sometimes infectious adventure". Mira and Antonin Liehm commented that "it is almost incredible how fresh and new this film seemed, with its tame satirical theme". John Wakeman regarded it as a "subtle and often very funny satire". David C. Gillespie opined that it is "an important, largely successful attempt... in addressing the legacy of Stalinism and its effects on the psyche and behaviour of people". Josephine Woll concluded that True Friends "broke little new ground", reflecting the slow start of the Thaw in 1954, but that it satisfied the audience's "hunger" for films that, "banal plot and schematic characters notwithstanding, portrayed their life with some veracity".
