= Brezhnev (film) =

- Written by: Sergey Snezhkin; Valentin Chernykh
- Directed by: Sergey Snezhkin
- Starring: Sergey Shakurov
- Country of origin: Russia
- Original language: Russian

Production
- Producer: Sergey Melkumov
- Running time: 208 minutes
- Production company: Slovo

Original release
- Release: March 28, 2005

Brezhnev (Russian: Брежнев) is a 2005 biographical TV movie about Soviet leader Leonid Brezhnev. It originally aired in four parts on Russia's Channel One.

The movie was an expensive period piece partly filmed in the Kremlin. While nostalgic, the film does not attempt to rehabilitate Brezhnev.

== Cast ==
- Sergey Shakurov as Leonid Brezhnev
- Artur Vakha as Leonid Brezhnev (young)
- Svetlana Kryuchkova as Viktoria Brezhneva
- Marina Solopchenko as Viktoria Brezhneva (young)
- Sergei Garmash as Stepan Kandaurov
- Valeri Zolotukhin as huntsman Igor
- Vasily Lanovoy as Yuri Andropov
- Vadim Yakovlev as Andrei Gromyko
- Igor Yasulovich as Mikhail Suslov
- Valery Ivchenko as Nikolai Tikhonov
- Yuriy Kuzmenkov as Nikolai Podgorny
- Vladimir Menshov as Dmitry Ustinov
- Lev Prygunov as Yevgeniy Chazov
- Aleksandr Filippenko as Georgy Tsinyov
- Vyacheslav Shalevich as Alexei Kosygin
- Afanasy Kochetkov as Konstantin Chernenko
- Sergei Losev as Nikita Khrushchev
- Igor Ivanov as Alexander Shelepin
- Igor Chernevich as Andrey Alexandrov-Agentov
- Valery Bychenkov as Dmitry Polyansky
- Gennadi Bogachyov as Nikolai Shchelokov
- Nikolai Kuznetsov as Frol Kozlov
- Boris Sokolov as Georgy Tsukanov
- Vadim Lobanov as Nikolai Ogarkov
- Alexander Semchev as Aleksandr Bovin
- Oleg Volku as Vladimir Medvedev, deputy chief of the Brezhnev's guard
- Maria Shukshina as the nurse
- Andrey Krasko as the barber Tolik
- Andrei Zibrov as Konovalchuk, sergeant-major
- Sergei Barkovsky as Mikhail Gorbachev
- Vadim Volkov as Gromyko's assistant
