= Lev Tolstoy (film) =

- Russian: Лев Толстой
- Directed by: Sergey Gerasimov
- Written by: Sergey Gerasimov
- Starring: Sergey Gerasimov; Tamara Makarova; Borivoj Navrátil; Aleksey Petrenko; Marina Ustimenko
- Cinematography: Sergey Filippov
- Music by: Pavel Chekalov
- Production company: Gorky Film Studio
- Release date: 1984
- Running time: 168 min.
- Countries: Soviet Union; Czechoslovakia
- Language: Russian

Lev Tolstoy (Russian: Лев Толстой) is a 1984 Soviet drama film directed by Sergey Gerasimov.

== Plot ==
The film tells about the life and death of the great Russian writer Lev Tolstoy.

== Cast ==
- Sergey Gerasimov as Lev Tolstoy
- Tamara Makarova as Sophia Tolstaya
- Borivoj Navrátil as Dushan Petrovich Makovitsky
- Aleksey Petrenko as Vladimir Chertkov
- Marina Ustimenko as Tatiana Sukhotina-Tolstaya
- Yekaterina Vasilyeva as Alexandra Tolstaya
- Yan Yanakiyev as Sergei Tolstoy
- Viktor Proskurin as Andrei Lvovich
- Nikolai Yeremenko Jr. as Aleksandr Goldenweiser
- Aleksey Shmarinov as Sergiyenko
- Vyacheslav Nevinny as Miklekseich
- Vladimir Kashpur as Tolstoy's companion on the train
- František Desset as Nikitin
- Lyudmila Zaytseva as episode
