= Ivan Kuznetsov (actor) =

Russian actor (1909–1976)

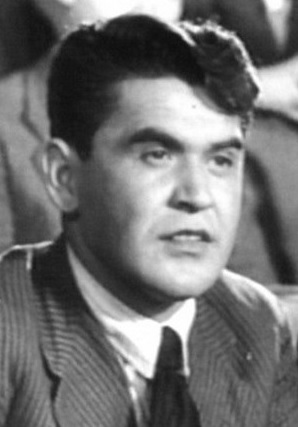
- Kuznetsov in 1939
- Born: 7 June 1909; Saratov, Russian Empire
- Died: 23 August 1976 (aged 67); Moscow, USSR
- Occupation: Actor
- Years active: 1934-1976

Ivan Nikolayevich Kuznetsov (Russian: Иван Николаевич Кузнецов; 7 June 1909 — 23 August 1976) was a Russian actor. He appeared in more than thirty films from 1936 to 1976.

== Selected filmography ==
Year	Title	Role	Notes
1936	Seven Brave Men	Sasha Rybnikov	
1937	The Thirteen	Yusuf Akchurin	
1938	Komsomolsk	Butsenko	
1943	Two Soldiers	Galanin	
1945	Dark Is the Night	Vyatkin	
1953	Incident in the Taiga	Dolgushin	
1964	Kingdom of Crooked Mirrors	Bar	
1964	Wagtails Army		
1964	Two on the Steppes		
