= Daughters-Mothers =

- Russian: Дочки-матери
- Directed by: Sergei Gerasimov
- Written by: Aleksandr Volodin
- Starring: Innokenty Smoktunovsky; Tamara Makarova; Sergey Gerasimov; Lyubov Polekhina; Svetlana Smekhnova
- Cinematography: Vladimir Rapoport
- Edited by: Lidiya Zhuchkova
- Music by: Stanislav Chekin
- Production company: Gorky Film Studio
- Release date: 1974
- Running time: 101 min.
- Country: Soviet Union
- Language: Russian

Daughters-Mothers (Russian: Дочки-матери, romanized: Dochki-materi) is a 1974 Soviet drama film directed by Sergei Gerasimov.

The film tells about a girl who grew up in an orphanage, not knowing her own mother. Suddenly, she receives an old letter that her mother wrote many years ago. She decides to visit Moscow to meet her mother.

== Plot ==
Olga Vasilyeva, a young woman raised in an orphanage and studying at a vocational school, is determined to find the mother she has never met. Olga’s only clue is a letter from her mother, kept in her file at the orphanage. During her vacation, she travels from Sverdlovsk to Moscow, where the return address on the letter leads.

At this address lives Elena Alexeyevna, a ballet teacher, married to a professor at a Moscow technical institute. Although she warmly welcomes Olga, they quickly discover that Elena is not her mother; she simply shares the same name as Olga’s mother. Despite this, Elena sympathizes with Olga and offers to help her in her search, inviting her to visit anytime.

Olga, kind-hearted, straightforward, and resilient, often speaks her mind, which creates tension with Elena’s daughters, Anna and Galina, who are spoiled and disdainful toward the provincial newcomer. Olga’s bluntness also inadvertently stirs conflict between Elena and her husband, Vadim Antonovich, who has been struggling with stalled ambitions in academia. Though her honesty creates awkward situations, Elena continues to support Olga and aids in the search for her mother.

When the vacation ends, Olga returns to her vocational school dormitory at the Ural Heavy Machinery Plant in Sverdlovsk. Surrounded by familiar faces, she still feels deeply alone. Eventually, she receives news from Elena: Vadim Antonovich has found her mother in the town of Toropets, in the Kalinin region. Resolute, Olga prepares for the journey, realizing that her mother might need her help.

== Cast ==
- Innokenty Smoktunovsky as Vadim Antonovich Vasilyev
- Tamara Makarova as Yelena Alekseyevna Vasilyeva
- Sergei Gerasimov as Pyotr Vorobyov
- Lyubov Polekhina as Olga Vasileyeva
- Svetlana Smekhnova as Anya Vasilyeva
- Larisa Udovichenko as Galya Vasilyeva
- Zura Kipshidze as Rezo
- Valentina Khmara as Natasha
