= The Village Doctor =

- Russian: Сельский врач
- Directed by: Sergey Gerasimov
- Written by: Mariya Smirnova
- Starring: Tamara Makarova
- Cinematography: Vladimir Rapoport
- Edited by: Lydia Zhuchkova
- Music by: Nikolay Budashkin
- Production company: Gorky Film Studio
- Release date: 1951
- Running time: 111 min.
- Country: Soviet Union
- Language: Russian

The Village Doctor (Russian: Сельский врач, romanized: Selskiy vrach) is a 1951 Soviet drama film directed by Sergei Gerasimov.

== Plot ==
A young doctor Tatyana Kazakova comes in a direction from Moscow to a small district hospital. Initially, the relationship between her and the head the old doctor Arseny Ivanovich does not add up. But gradually she manages to win the trust of the collective, the sick and gain respect from her senior colleague. Much has to be done together to raise rural health care to a new level.

== Cast ==
- Tamara Makarova as Dr. Tatyana Kazakova
- Grigori Belov as Dr. Arsenyev
- Lena Belsky as Young Mother
- Ivan Bulganov as Sasha
- Anatoly Dudorov as Dr. Anatoly Tyomkin
- Vladimir Gulyaev as Viktor Potapov, steward
- Georgy Millyar as Dmitry Vasilyevich
- Lev Kapustin as Ivan Pospelov
- Klavdiya Khabarova as Nura, nurse
- Aleksandra Kharitonova as Shura, nurse
- Viktor Klyucharev as Andrey Kulik
- Ekaterina Savinova as Dusya Pospelova
- Inna Makarova as Baranova
- Rozina Mandelova as Granny
- Nikolay Smorchkov as Zhenya Strukov
- Vsevolod Sanaev as Nikolai Petrovich Korotkov
- Aleksandr Smirnov as Skvortsov
- Valentina Telegina as Pasha
- Maria Tushova as Head Nurse
- Klara Rumyanova as Lena Zueva

== Interesting facts ==
During filming, the baby, depicting Lena's baby, fell asleep, and the crying of the newborn was voiced by Klara Rumyanova herself.
