= Emmanuil Kazakevich =

- Born: February 24, 1913; Kremenchuk, Russian Empire
- Died: September 22, 1962 (aged 49); Moscow, Soviet Union
- Occupations: writer, playwright, poet
- Writing career
- Notable work: The Blue Notebook

Emmanuil Genrikhovich Kazakevich (Russian: Эммануи́л Ге́нрихович Казаке́вич, Yiddish: עמנואל קאַזאַקעװיטש; February 24, 1913 – September 22, 1962) was a Soviet author, poet and playwright of Jewish origin, writing in Russian and Yiddish.

== Biography ==
=== Early life ===
Kazakevich was born at Kremenchuk in Ukraine (then part of Imperial Russia) in 1913 and received training as an engineer at Kharkiv. In the early 1930s he moved to the Jewish autonomous region of Birobidzhan on the Amur River, where he became the chairman of a local kolkhoz and also ran a theatre. During these years he began writing and publishing poems and stories in Yiddish. In 1941 he was in Moscow, taking part in the defence efforts of the capital and later joining the regular Red Army for frontier service. His war service brought him close to some of the major battles of 1943-45 and finally into the battle for Berlin; by this time he had become assistant director of intelligence in one of the armies involved.

=== Career ===
After 1945 Kazakevich began writing in Russian, and his debut short story Zvezda ("The Star", 1947, adapted to film in 1949 and in 2002 by Nikolai Lebedev) was an instant success and awarded a Stalin Prize for literature. The story describes an army intelligence unit during the Second World War and their raid behind enemy lines. It showcases some of his later recurrent traits: the sharp, lyrical evocation of nature, the interest in moral conflicts and ambiguities, often relating to the transition between war and peace, the sense of humour and psychological observation. Many of his later stories are set during or shortly after the Second World War. Kazakevich's 1948 story "Dvoe v stepi" ("Two in the Steppe", adapted into a 1964 film of the same name and a 2015 film, “On the Road to Berlin"), was fiercely criticized in the Party press but that did not prevent his next story "Vesna na Odere" ("Spring on the Oder River," 1949) from being awarded a second Stalin Prize. His 1960 novella "In the Light of Day" explores ambiguities of guilt, bravery and memory as a soldier makes a visit to the widow of his fallen friend and unit officer.

Kazakevich reached high positions in the Soviet Association of Writers during the 1950s and was aligned with the efforts of de-Stalinization. He kept picking up potentially sensitive subjects, and was likely planning to bring together his writings about Lenin during the revolutionary years into a major novel during his last years. The short novel Sinyaya tetrad (The Blue notebook, 1961) is set during Lenin's stay on the Karelian isthmus in the summer of 1917. The story brings Lenin face to face both with ordinary people and with Grigory Zinovyev. In the novel’s end, Lenin refutes Zinovyev's fears and allegations, but Kazakevich makes no attempt to show the latter as an evil or insincere person, which could have at that time been expected of most Soviet writers as Zinovyev was then considered a traitor or at best a dubious figure. Kazakevich continued with Lenin as a main character in another story, "Enemies", written in his last year. His sudden passing in the summer of 1962 meant any plans for a larger work on Lenin were left unfulfilled.

== Works ==
Short Stories

- Zvezda (“The Star”), 1947
- Dvoe v stepi (“Two in the Steppe”), 1948
- Vesna na Odere (“Spring on the Oder River”), 1949
- “In the Light of Day”, 1960

English translations

- Star: A Story, Foreign Languages Publishing House, 1952.
- Heart of a Friend: A Story, Foreign Languages Publishing House, 1952.
- Hungarian meetings, - his travel notes on Russian, 1955 (The Hungarian Revolution was in 1956).
- The House on the Square, Foreign Languages Publishing House, 1957.
- Selected Works, Progress Publishers, 1978.
- The Blue Notebook, Fredonia Books, 2002.
