= Valentyn Kornienko =

Ukrainian translator

- Born: April 10, 1939; Krasylivka, Kiev region, Ukrainian SSR, Soviet Union
- Died: February 22, 2011 (aged 71); Ternopil, Ukraine
- Education: Kiev University
- Occupation: Translator
- Father: Oleksii Kornienko

Valentyn Oleksiiovych Kornienko (Ukrainian: Валентин Олексійович Корнієнко; 10 April 1939 – 22 February 2011) was a Ukrainian translator and, member of the Writers' Union of Ukraine.

== Biography ==
Kornienko was born in the village of Krasylivka, in Brovary Raion in the Kiev region. After World War II, his family moved to Ternopil, a city in annexed Western Ukraine, where Korniyenko graduated from high school. He continued his studies at the philology faculty at Kiev University, graduating from there in 1961.

After getting his degree, Kornienko returned to Ternopil to work as a school teacher. A few years later, he moved back to Kiev again and spent almost forty years of his career there, working as an editor at the publishing houses Dnipro and Molod, and for the magazines Ukraina and Vsesvit. In 1989, he was elected as a member of the Writers' Union of Ukraine. In 2001, Kornienko returned to Ternopil, where he died on 22 February 2011.

Kornienko was a translator whose work includes translations of Jack London and Mark Twain. He is best known for his 2001 translation of Alice’s Adventures in Wonderland, which was only the second complete Ukrainian version, following the first in 1960. In this work, he replaced British cultural markers with Ukrainian equivalents, leading critic Ivan Dzyuba to say that Ukraine "finally" had its own Alice. In 2009, the Writers' Union of Ukraine awarded Kornienko an honorary diploma.
