= Konstantin Khudyakov =

Russian artist (1945–2026)

Konstantin Vasilyevich Khudyakov (Russian: Константин Васильевич Худяков; 2 January 1945 – 27 June 2026) was a Russian visual artist.

== Life and work ==
Khudyakov was born in Tsarevshchina, Baltai on 2 January 1945. He worked primarily in digital art.

In 2014, he signed the Collective Appeal of Russian Cultural Figures in Support of the President's Position on Ukraine and Crimea.

Khudyakov died on 27 June 2026, at the age of 81.

== Awards ==
- Honored Artist of the Russian Federation.
- 2020: Honorary Badge of the Governor of Saratov Oblast.
