= Anatoli Romashin =

Soviet and Russian film and theater actor and director

- Анатолий Ромашин
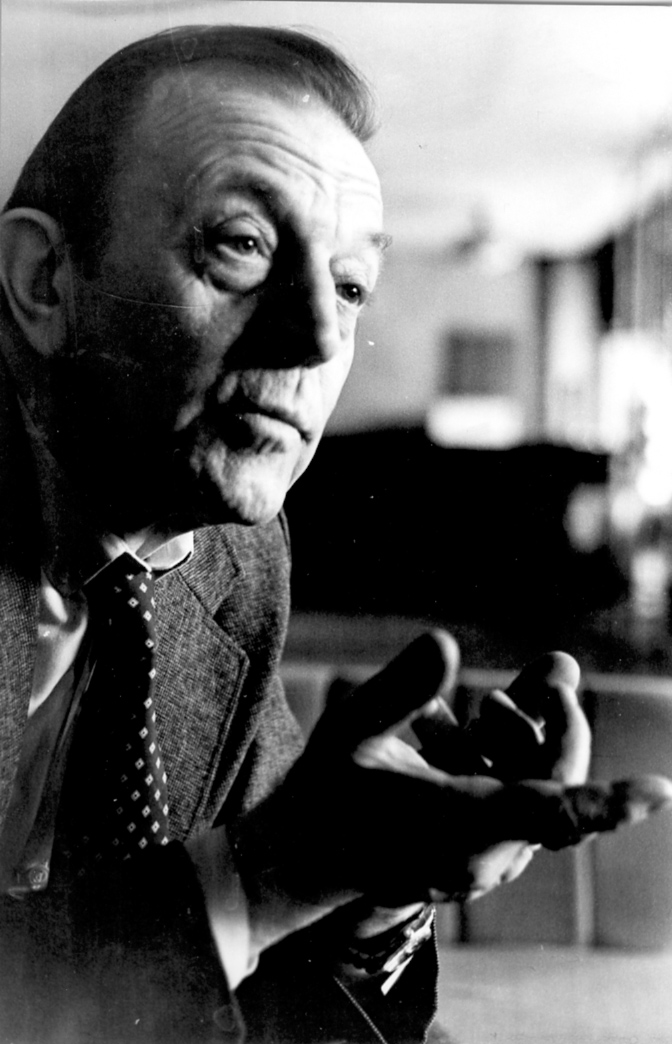
- Romashin in 1991
- Born: Anatoli Vladimirovich Romashin; January 1, 1931; Leningrad, Soviet Union
- Died: August 8, 2000 (aged 69); Pushkino, Pushkinsky District, Moscow Oblast, Russia
- Years active: 1955–2000

Anatoli Vladimirovich Romashin (Russian: Анато́лий Влади́мирович Рома́шин; 1 January 1931 – 8 August 2000) was a Soviet and Russian film and theater actor, director. He won the USSR State Prize (1977) and was a People's Artist of the RSFSR (1982).

== Biography ==
Anatoli Romashin was born in Leningrad on 1 January 1931. His father was a Russian, mother was an Estonian. His brother Vladimir (1932-2012) was an opera singer. He graduated from the Moscow Art Theatre School (course of Victor Stanitsyn) in 1959. Since 1959 - an actor Mayakovsky Theatre.

The actor became widely recognized after the release of the 1974 Elem Klimov's film Agony, where Romashin played the role of Nicholas II.

In recent years, he played in the Moscow Luna Theater under the directorship of Sergei Prokhanov.

According to critics, Romashin was the perfect actor for the role of a Russian intelligent. He often played such roles throughout his acting career.

== Death ==
Romashin was killed in an accident on the evening of August 8, 2000 near the town of Pushkino, Moscow Oblast. The actor was crushed by an old pine tree that he was attempting to cut down with a chainsaw while staying at his dacha. He was buried in the Vagankovo Cemetery. Six months later, the dacha was destroyed by a fire.

== Selected filmography ==
- The Hyperboloid of Engineer Garin (Russian: Гиперболоид инженера Гарина, 1965) as Dr. Wolf
- The Seventh Companion (Седьмой спутник, 1967) as white officer
- Strong with Spirit (Сильные духом, 1967) as Oberleutnant
- Hit Back (Ответный ход, 1971) as Major General Nefedov
- The Love of Mankind (Любить человека, 1972) as Arkhangelsky, Maria's ex-husband
- Agony (Агония, 1974) as emperor Nicholas II
- An Unfinished Piece for Mechanical Piano (Неоконченная пьеса для механического пианино, 1977) as Gerasim Kuzmich Petrin
- Where were you, Odysseus? (Где ты был, Одиссей?, 1978) as SS Sturmbannführer Karl Ehrlich
- The Rooks (Грачи, 1982) as Beloded, investigator
- Anna Pavlova (Анна Павлова, 1983) as Alexandre Benois
- And Then Where Were None (Десять негритят, 1987) as Doctor Armstrong
- Friend (Друг, 1987) as Friend's owner
