= Alexey Pokrovsky =

Russian actor (1924–2009)

- Born: Alexey Nikolayevich Pokrovsky; March 1, 1924; Moscow, RSFSR, USSR
- Died: August 30, 2009 (aged 85); Moscow, Russia
- Occupations: actor, singer
- Years active: 1945–2009
- Spouse: Alina Pokrovskaya

Alexey Nikolayevich Pokrovsky (Russian: Алексе́й Никола́евич Покро́вский; March 1, 1924 – August 30, 2009) was an actor and singer, People's Artist of the RSFSR (1981).

== Biography ==
In 1945 he was accepted into the troupe of the Moscow Art Theater. In 1977 he left the theatre because of divergences in his views with Oleg Yefremov.

From the end of the 1940s he appeared in films, including in the films The Star (1953) and True Friends (1954).

He became well known as a performer of songs and romances. In the 1960s and 1980s, he sang 12 musical and poetic compositions on television, in which the best poems and songs of the era were presented in the interpretation of the artist, who accompanied himself on a small Viennese seven-string Russian guitar. Laureate of the festivals Pesnya goda 1974 and 1975.

He died on August 30, 2009. He was buried in Moscow at the Vagankovskoye Cemetery (plot 26).
