= Flying Days =

1966 Soviet drama film

- Russian: Дни лётные
- Directed by: Nikolai Litus; Leonid Rizin
- Written by: Leonid Rizin
- Starring: Nikolay Olyalin; Yuriy Kuzmenkov; Vladimir Petchenko; Ada Voloshina; Vera Alentova
- Cinematography: Vitaly Kalashnikov
- Edited by: T. Bykov
- Music by: Yevgeni Zubtsov
- Release date: 1966
- Running time: 83 minute
- Country: Soviet Union
- Language: Russian

Flying Days (Russian: Дни лётные) is a 1966 Soviet drama film directed by Nikolai Litus and Leonid Rizin.

== Plot ==
The film follows three young lieutenants serving in an aviation regiment as they navigate the challenges of their early careers. Facing their first successes and setbacks, triumphs and losses, they remain united by their passion for flight.

Having spent their school years devoted to the dream of soaring through the skies, they now train as test pilots for supersonic jets, grappling with tasks that test their skills and resolve. Together, they conquer the heavens, leaving behind earthly concerns and disputes.

However, the life of a test pilot is unpredictable and perilous. A routine training flight can quickly turn into a harsh trial of courage and determination. For these future aces, today's mission is a difficult test, and their ultimate grade will be given by life itself.

== Cast ==
- Nikolay Olyalin as Nikolay Bordyrev
- Yuriy Kuzmenkov as Andrey
- Vladimir Petchenko as Aleksey (as V. Petchenko)
- Ada Voloshina as Lesya (as A. Voloshina)
- Vera Alentova as Lidia Fyodorovna
- Nikolay Eryomenko as Nikolay Nikolayevich (as N. Yeryomenko)
- Nikolai Barmin as general Barabin (as N. Barmin)
- Boris Savchenko as Letchik (as B. Savchenko)

== Literature ==
- Demin, V. "Triptych on 'Elementary Concepts'." Iskusstvo Kino, 1966, no. 11, pp. 39–46.
