= Men and Beasts =

- Russian: Люди и звери
- Directed by: Sergei Gerasimov
- Written by: Sergei Gerasimov; Tamara Makarova
- Starring: Nikolai Yeremenko Sr.; Tamara Makarova; Zhanna Bolotova
- Cinematography: Vladimir Rapoport
- Edited by: Monika Behrendt; L. Suckova
- Music by: Aram Khachaturian
- Release date: 1962
- Running time: 178 minute
- Countries: East Germany; Soviet Union
- Language: Russian

Men and Beasts (Russian: Люди и звери, romanized: Lyudi i zveri) is a 1962 Soviet-German drama film directed by Sergei Gerasimov.

The film tells about a man named Alexei, who returns home after wandering and as a result of misunderstanding by his family he goes to Zaporizhzhia.

== Plot ==
The story follows the dramatic life of Alexei Ivanovich Pavlov, a commander of the Red Army. In January 1942, near Mga, Alexei is captured and taken as a prisoner of war. After being displaced for 17 years and wandering through foreign lands, he decides to return to the Soviet Union. Alexei travels to meet his brother in Sevastopol in southern Ukraine.

During his journey, Alexei meets Anna Andreyevna, a doctor he once saved during the Siege of Leningrad. She is traveling south from Moscow with her daughter, Tanya, and invites Alexei to join them. Along the way, Alexei shares his life story.

The group stops near a reservoir for dinner, and Alexei reminisces about his time in Argentina, where illness caused him to lose his job as a laborer. Friends from his camp, Vasily Klyachko and Savvateev, intervened on his behalf but were met by the estate's mistress, Maria Nikolaevna. These memories fade as Alexei continues his journey the next day.

In a village, a drunken driver causes an accident. Anna treats the injured, while Alexei and Tanya remain behind. Alexei reflects on human nature, explaining that some people are without malice, holding the world together. He recounts his time in concentration camps, including Majdanek, Dachau, and Buchenwald. He describes his escape attempts and eventual liberation by American forces. Following the war, Alexei worked in Sudan, Canada, and Argentina.

More memories surface: Maria Nikolaevna, the estate mistress, employed Alexei as a driver but disparaged Russia after a visit. Alexei clashed with her and later worked in Hamburg as a driver-mechanic for a wealthy German family. He struggled with the family's fascist leanings and eventually quit after altercations with their sons. Betrayed by his old campmates, Alexei attempted suicide but was saved by a kind German woman, Frau Wilde, whom he credited with restoring his faith in humanity.

Arriving in Zaporizhzhia, Alexei visits Anna's relatives and observes the bustling life at a steel plant. A celebration ensues after the successful launch of new machinery. Meanwhile, Alexei's brother, Petr, is revealed to have hidden Alexei's existence for years, under pressure from his wife, Valentina. She burned Alexei’s letters and claimed he was dead. Tanya intervenes, convincing Petr’s family to reunite with Alexei.

The brothers finally meet, but their years apart have made them very different people, highlighting the profound impacts of their respective journeys.

== Cast ==
- Nikolai Yeremenko Sr. as Alexei Ivanovic Pavlov (as Nikolaj Eremenko)
- Tamara Makarova as Anna Andreevna
- Zhanna Bolotova as Tanja
- Mikhail Gluzsky as Vasily Klyachko
- Karla Assmus as Annemarie
- Fredy Barten as Koch
- Evelyn Cron as Brigitte
- Sergey Nikonenko as Yuri Pavlov
- Erika Dunkelmann as Frau Haslinger
- Jürgen Frohriep as Gefreiter
