= Nelly Korniyenko =

Soviet and Russian actress (1938–2019)

- Born: Nelly Ivanovna Korniyenko; 23 May 1938; Moscow, USSR
- Died: 9 May 2019 (aged 80); Moscow, Russia
- Occupation: actress
- Years active: 1959−2019
- Spouse: Yuri Vasilyev
- Awards: People's Artist of the RSFSR (1974)

Nelly Ivanovna Korniyenko (Russian: Не́лли Ива́новна Корние́нко; May 23, 1938 – May 9, 2019) was a Soviet and Russian film and theater actress.

== Career ==
She graduated from Mikhail Shchepkin Higher Theater School (course of Viktor Korshunov). From 1959 she worked at Maly Theatre. She was in the cinema from 1960. She had 17 roles.

She was awarded the title People's Artist of the RSFSR in 1974.

From 1980 to 1988 she taught acting at the Shchepkin Theater School.

== Selected filmography ==
- 1965 - Our House
