= Lidiya Smirnova =

Soviet and Russian actress

- Лидия Смирнова
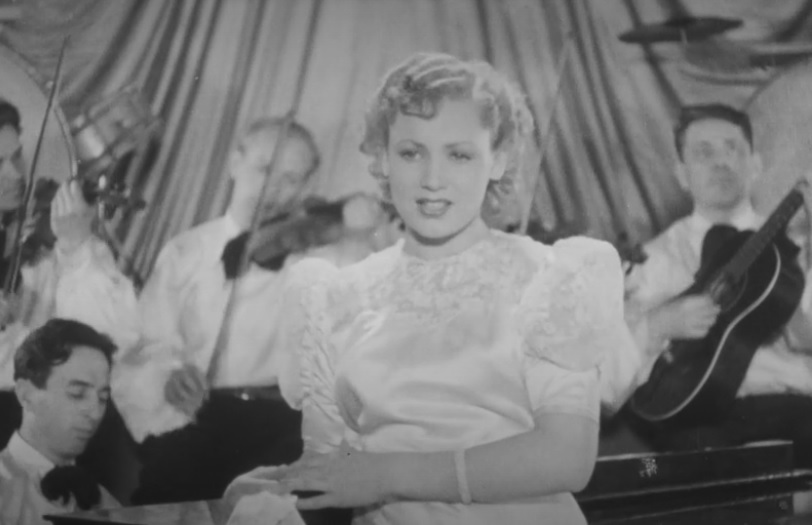
- Smirnova in My Love (1940)
- Born: Lidiya Nikolayevna Smirnova; 13 February 1915; Menzelinsk, Ufa Governorate, Russian Empire
- Died: 25 July 2007 (aged 92); Zelenograd, Russia
- Occupation: Actress
- Years active: 1934–2005
- Awards: People's Artist of the USSR (1974)

Lidiya Nikolayevna Smirnova (Russian: Ли́дия Никола́евна Смирно́ва; 13 February 1915 – 25 July 2007) was a Soviet and Russian stage and film actress. She was awarded People's Artist of the USSR (1974). She was member of the Communist Party of the Soviet Union since 1952.

== Filmography ==
- The New Moscow (1938) as a girl (uncredited)
- My Love (1940) as Shura
- Lad from Our Town (1942) as Varya Lukonina-Burmina
- She Defends the Motherland (1943) as Fenya
- They Have a Motherland (1949) as orphanage teacher Smayda
- The Miners of Donetsk (1951) as Vera Nikolayevna, Trofimenko's wife
- Silvery Dust (1953) as Flossie Bate, prostitute
- Least We Forget (1954) as Anna Dashenko
- Michman Panin (1960) as Grigoryev's wife
- Silence (1963) as Serafima Ignatyevna Bykova
- It Happened at the Police Station (1963) as Zubareva, professor's wife
- Welcome, or No Trespassing (1964) as doctor
- Balzaminov's Marriage (1964) as Akulina Gavrilovna Krasavina, matchmaker
- Village Detective (1969) as Yevdokiya Mironovna Pronina, rural shop clerk
- Ilf and Petrov Rode a Tram (1972) as handler and artistic director of circus
- Rudin (1977) as Darya Mikhailovna Lasunskaya
- Carnival (1981) as chairman of the inspection board
- Premonition of Love (1982) as Marya Georgiyevna

== Awards and honors ==
- Two Orders of the Badge of Honour (one in 1950)
- Stalin Prize, 3rd class (1951) – for her portrayal of Smayda in They Have a Motherland (1949)
- Honored Artist of the RSFSR (1955)
- People's Artist of the RSFSR (1965)
- People's Artist of the USSR (1974)
- Order of the October Revolution (1985)
- Order "For Merit to the Fatherland", 4th class (1995)
- Order "For Merit to the Fatherland", 3rd class (2000)
- Order of Friendship (2005)
- Order of the Red Banner of Labour
