= Tamara Makarova =

Soviet actress (1907–1997)

- Тамара Макарова
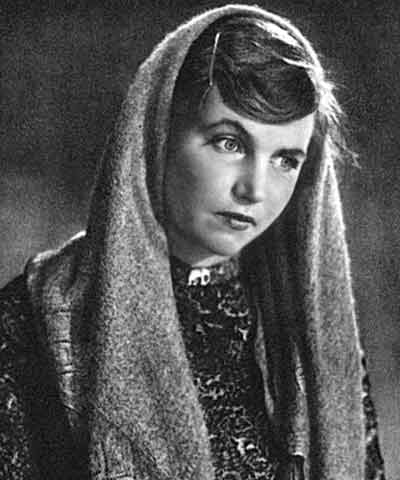
- Makarova in 1939
- Born: August 13, 1907; Saint Petersburg, Russian Empire
- Died: January 19, 1997 (aged 89); Moscow, Russia
- Occupations: Actress, pedagogue
- Years active: 1927–1985
- Spouse: Sergei Gerasimov

Tamara Fyodorovna Makarova (Russian: Тамара Фёдоровна Макарова; 13 August 1907 – 19 January 1997) was a Soviet and Russian film actress and pedagogue. She was awarded the title to the People's Artist of the USSR (1950) and Hero of Socialist Labour (1982).

== Biography ==
Makarova was born in Saint Petersburg. She enrolled in the MASTFOR theater program in 1924, where she first met Sergei Gerasimov. The two began a romantic relationship and soon married. After World War II, they moved to Moscow, where Makarova began to teach at the Russian State University of Cinematography, which was later named after her husband.

== Filmography ==
- Somebody Else's Coat (1927) – typist Dudkina
- The New Babylon (1929) – can-can dancer
- The Deserter (1933) – Greta Zelle
- The Conveyor of Death (1933) – Anna
- Seven Brave Men (1936) – doctor Zhenya Okhrimenko
- Komsomolsk (1938) – Natasha Solovyova
- The Great Dawn (1938) – Svetlana
- The New Teacher (1939) – Agrafena Shumilina
- Masquerade (1941) – Nina
- The Ural Front (1944) – Anna Ivanovna Sviridova
- The Stone Flower (1946) – the Mistress of the Copper Mountain
- The Vow (1946) – Kseniya
- The Young Guard (1948) – Yelena Koshevaya, Oleg's mother
- First-Year Student (1948) – Anna Ivanovna, teacher
- Tale of a True Man (1948) – Klavdiya Mikhailovna
- Three Encounters (1948) – Olimpiada Samoseyeva
- The Village Doctor (1951) – doctor Tatyana Nikolayevna Kozakova
- Men and Beasts (1962) – Anna Andreyevna Soboleva
- The Journalist (1967) – Olga Panina
- The Love of Mankind (1972) – architect Aleksandra Vasilyevna Petrushkova
- Daughters-Mothers (1974) – Yelena Alekseyevna Vasilyeva
- The Youth of Peter the Great (1980) – Natalya Naryshkina
- At the Beginning of Glorious Days (1980) – Natalya Naryshkina
- Lev Tolstoy (1984) – Sophia Tolstaya

== Awards ==
=== State Awards ===
- Hero of Socialist Labour (August 13, 1982)
- Honored Artist of the RSFSR (November 21, 1942)
- People's Artist of the RSFSR
- People's Artist of the USSR (March 6, 1950)
- Stalin Prize, Second Class (1941) — for her role as Agrafena Shumilina in the film "Teacher" (1939)
- Stalin Prize, First Class (1947) — for her role as Ksenia in the film "The Oath" (1946)
- Order of the Badge of Honour (February 1, 1939) — for her performance as Svetlana in the film "The Great Glow" (1938) and Natasha in the film "Komsomolsk" (1938)
- Order of the Red Banner of Labour (1967)
- Two Orders of Lenin (1977, 1982)
- Order of Friendship of Peoples (December 3, 1987) - for services to the development of Soviet cinema
- Medal "For Valiant Labour in the Great Patriotic War 1941–1945"
- Medal "For the Victory over Germany in the Great Patriotic War 1941–1945"
- Jubilee Medal "Twenty Years of Victory in the Great Patriotic War 1941–1945"
- Jubilee Medal "Thirty Years of Victory in the Great Patriotic War 1941–1945"
- Jubilee Medal "Forty Years of Victory in the Great Patriotic War 1941–1945"
- Jubilee Medal "50 Years of Victory in the Great Patriotic War 1941–1945"
- Medal "For the Defence of Leningrad"
- Medal "For the Defence of Moscow"
- Medal of Zhukov
- Medal "Veteran of Labour"
- Jubilee Medal "In Commemoration of the 100th Anniversary of the Birth of Vladimir Ilyich Lenin"
- Medal "In Commemoration of the 250th Anniversary of Leningrad"
- Medal "In Commemoration of the 800th Anniversary of Moscow"
- Jubilee Medal "70 Years of the Armed Forces of the USSR"

=== Other awards ===
- Golden Knight International Film Festival of Slavic and Orthodox Peoples (1992, Prize "For Outstanding Contribution to Slavic Cinema")
- International Film Actors Festival "Sozvezdie" (1993, Prize "For Outstanding Contribution to the Profession")
- Nika Award for the Lifetime Achievement Award in the "Honor and Dignity" category (1995)
- Awards of the President (Russia)#Letter of Gratitude from the President of the Russian Federation (25.12.1995) - in connection with the 100th anniversary of world and Russian cinema, for services to the state and a great contribution to national culture.
