= The Journalist (1967 film) =

1967 Soviet romantic drama film

- Directed by: Sergei Gerasimov
- Screenplay by: Sergei Gerasimov
- Starring: Galina Polskikh; Yuri Vasilyev
- Cinematography: Vladimir Rapoport
- Music by: Pavel Chekalov
- Production company: Mosfilm
- Release date: 1967
- Running time: 226 minutes
- Country: Soviet Union
- Language: Russian

The Journalist (Russian: Журналист, romanized: Zhurnalist) is a 1967 Soviet romantic drama. It was directed and written by Sergei Gerasimov. The film stars Galina Polskikh and Yuri Vasilyev and tells a story of love between a successful Moscow journalist and a girl in a remote city in the Urals.

== Plot ==
The film consists of two parts. In the first part entitled "Encounters" a successful journalist from Moscow Yuri Aliabiev (Y.Vasiliev) travels to a small city in the Urals because a certain Anikina, woman living in the city, writes complaints about local authorities accusing them of dissipation and bribe-taking. Arriving in the city Aliabiev meets Shura Okaemova, a nice-looking girl who works at a local plant. Attracted by Shura's intelligence and beauty Aliabiev attempts to seduce her but Shura rejects his attempts. Aliabiev leaves for Moscow and then on a business trip for Paris.

The second part ("Garden and Spring") tells about Aliabiev's life in Paris where he meets Annie Girardot, attends the rehearsal of Mireille Mathieu and conducts extensive discussions with his new friend, an American journalist, trying to persuade him in the advantages of Soviet way of life. Returning from Paris to Moscow Aliabiev travels to the city in the Urals again. He failed to forget Shura and wants to resume their relationship. On arriving to the city he finds out that Anikina wrote letters to local authorities accusing Shura of a liaison with him. The Komsomol meeting decided to move Shura from her house to a hostel. Aliabiev finds Sura to tell her about his love and they decide to marry.

== Cast ==
- Yuri Vasilyev — Yuri Aliabiev
- Galina Polskikh — Shura Okaemova
- Nadezhda Fedosova — Anikina
- Sergei Nikonenko — Reutov
- Valentina Telichkina — Valya
- Vasily Shukshin — Evgeny Sergeyevich, journalist
- Anatoli Kryzhansky — Sid Barton, an American journalist
- Annie Girardot — Annie Girardot (cameo appearance)
- Mireille Mathieu — Mireille Mathieu (cameo appearance)
- Sergei Gerasimov — Alexei Kolesnikov
- Tamara Makarova — Olga Panina

== Awards ==
The film was awarded the Grand Prix at 5th Moscow International Film Festival in 1967.
