= Vladimir Kashpur =

Russian and Soviet actor

- Владимир Кашпур
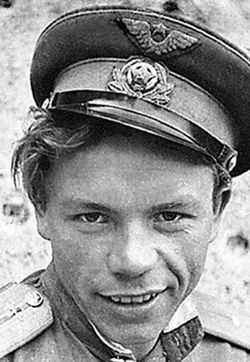
- Kashpur in 1944
- Born: Vladimir Terentyevich Kashpur; 26 October 1926; Severka, Russian SFSR, Soviet Union
- Died: 17 October 2009 (aged 82); Moscow, Russian Federation
- Resting place: Dolgoprudnenskoye cemetery, Dolgoprudny

Vladimir Terentyevich Kashpur (Russian: Владимир Терентьевич Кашпур; October 26, 1926 – October 17, 2009) was a Russian and Soviet actor. A native of Severka, Altai Krai, Kashpur appeared in Ballad of a Soldier and about 115 other films, with roles ranging from Vladimir Lenin to Baba Yaga. Kashpur was also active in the Moscow Art Theatre.

== Selected filmography ==
- Ballad of a Soldier (1959)
- Time, Forward! (1965)
- No Path Through Fire (1968)
- Liberation (1970)
- Commander of the Happy "Pike" (1972)
- Planet Parade (1984)
- Lev Tolstoy (1984)
- New Adventures of a Yankee in King Arthur's Court (1988)
- Cold Summer of 1953 (1988)
- It (1989)
- Taxi Blues (1990)
- Don't Play the Fool (1997)
- Composition for Victory Day (1998)
- The Wedding (2000)
- Bastards (2006)

== Awards ==
- Honored Artist of the RSFSR (1976)
- People's Artist of the RSFSR (1986)
- State Prize of the Russian Federation (2000)
- Order of Honour

== Personal life ==
Wife Lyudmila Grigorievna Kashpur, died in 2009. The couple had a son, Aleksei.

== External sources ==
- Obituary (in Russian)
