= Sergei Gerasimov (film director) =

Soviet film director and screenwriter (1906–1985)

- Сергей Герасимов
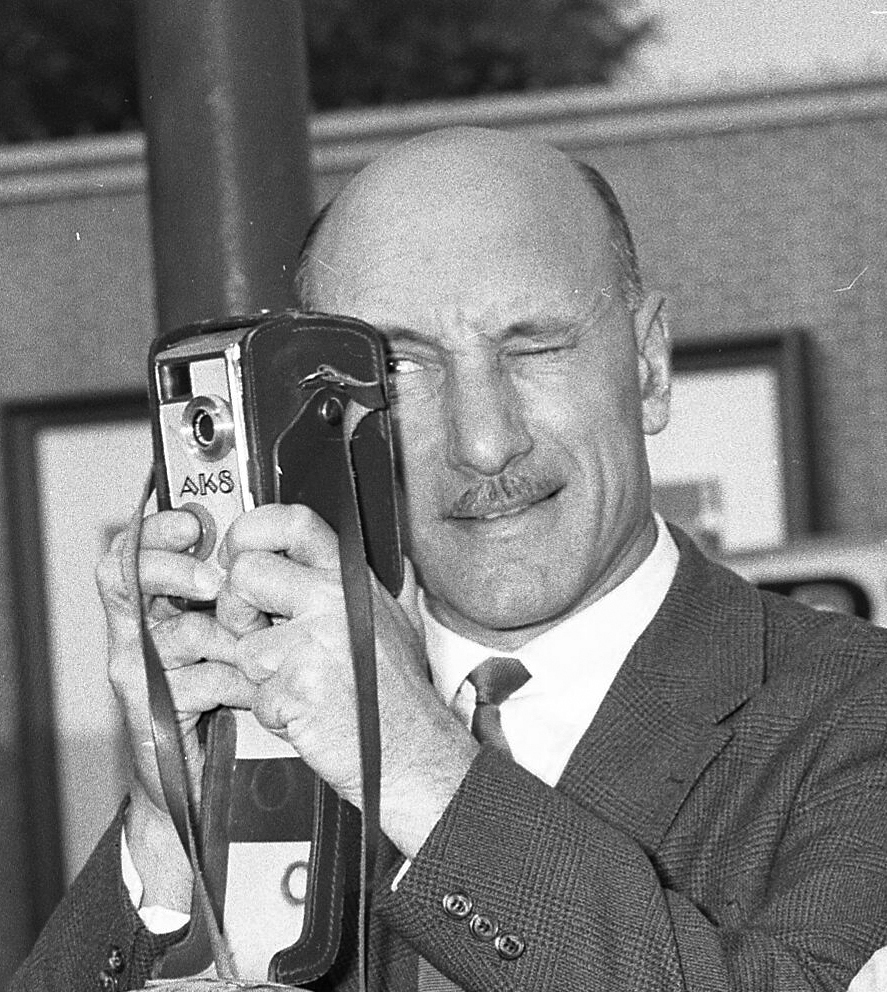
- Gerasimov touring Disneyland, 1958
- Born: 21 May 1906; Kundravy, Orenburg Governorate, Russian Empire
- Died: 26 November 1985 (aged 79); Moscow, Russian SFSR, Soviet Union
- Occupations: Film director; screenwriter; actor
- Years active: 1924–1985
- Spouse: Tamara Makarova

Sergei Apollinariyevich Gerasimov (Russian: Сергей Аполлинариевич Герасимов; 21 May 1906 – 26 November 1985) was a Soviet film director, actor, screenwriter, and pedagogue. The oldest film school in the world, the Gerasimov Institute of Cinematography (VGIK), bears his name.

== Career ==
Gerasimov started his film industry career as an actor in 1924. At first he appeared in Kozintsev and Trauberg films, such as The Overcoat and The New Babylon. Later, he was commissioned to produce screen versions of the literary classics of socialist realism. His epic screenings of Alexander Fadeyev's The Young Guard (1948) and Mikhail Sholokhov's And Quiet Flows the Don (1957–58) were extolled by the authorities as exemplary.

During several decades of their teaching in the VGIK Gerasimov and his wife Tamara Makarova prepared many generations of Russian actors. He also taught acclaimed actor Georgiy Zhzhonov at the Leningrad Theatrical School.

In his last film Gerasimov played Leo Tolstoy, while Makarova was cast as Tolstoy's wife. Gerasimov is buried in the Novodevichy Cemetery of Moscow.

A rare glimpse of Sergei Gerasimov can be found in a one and a half minute behind the scenes documentary featured as part of the Coming From The Movies Set series of Soviet film promos. In this piece Gerasimov can be seen in Norilsk on the set of his film The Love of Mankind. It's a story of two young architects struggling to build a new town in the Polar Regions. The film stars Ivan Negonov as the director of an Iron and Steel Works, Anatoly Solonitsyn as architect Kolmykov, Lyubov Virolainen as architect Arkhipova; and can be found as an extra on the 2003 DVD release of Andrei Tarkovsky's 1974 film The Mirror.

== Moscow Film Festival ==
Gerasimov was the president of the jury at the 1959, 1965, 1969 and the 1985 Moscow International Film Festival. He was a member of the jury in 1961 and 1971.

In 1967 his film The Journalist won the Grand Prix at the 1967 festival.

== Awards and honours ==
- Hero of Socialist Labour (1974)
- Four Orders of Lenin
- Order of the October Revolution
- Order of the Red Banner of Labour, twice (1940, 1950)
- Order of the Red Star (1944)
- People's Artist of the USSR, 1948
- Stalin Prize;
  - 1941 second degree – for the film The New Teacher (1939)
  - 1949 first degree – for the film The Young Guard (1948)
  - 1951 first degree – for the film The New China (1950)
- Lenin Komsomol Prize (1970) – the creation of films about young people, and the Lenin Komsomol a big public

and political activities

- USSR State Prize (1971) – for the film By the Lake (1969)
- Lenin Prize (1984) – for the movies in recent years
- Order of the White Lion, 3rd class (Czechoslovakia)
- Professor of the Gerasimov Institute of Cinematography in Moscow (1946)
- Member of the USSR Academy of Pedagogical Sciences (1978)
- Supreme Soviet of the Soviet Union (1950–1958)
- Doktor nauk (1967)
- Member of the Presidium of the Soviet Peace Committee (since 1950)
- Secretary of the Composers' Union
- Member of the USSR Writers' Union

== Filmography ==
=== Director ===
- Seven Brave Men (1936)
- Komsomolsk (1938)
- The New Teacher (1939)
- Masquerade (1941)
- The Ural Front (1944)
- The Young Guard (1948)
- The Village Doctor (1951)
- The New China (1952)
- Great Mourning (1953)
- And Quiet Flows the Don (1958)
- Men and Beasts (1962)
- The Journalist (1967)
- By the Lake (1969)
- The Love of Mankind (1972)
- Daughters-Mothers (1974)
- Red and Black (1976)
- The Youth of Peter the Great (1980)
- At the Beginning of Glorious Days (1980)
- Lev Tolstoy (1984)

=== Actor ===
- Mishki versus Yudenich (1925)
- The Devil's Wheel (1926)
- The Overcoat (1926)
- The Club of the Big Deed (1927)
- Somebody Else's Coat (1927)
- Little Brother (1927)
- Fragment of an Empire (1929)
- The New Babylon (1929)
- Alone (1931)
- The Deserter (1933)
- Masquerade (1941)
- Daughters-Mothers (1974)
- Lev Tolstoy (1984)

== See also ==
- Gerasimov Institute of Cinematography
