= Erwin Knausmüller =

Soviet and Russian actor (1912–2000)

- Knausmüller in The Saplings (1972)
- Born: January 31, 1912; Linz, Austria-Hungary
- Died: April 1, 2000 (aged 88); Moscow, Russia
- Years active: 1959–1993

Erwin Knausmüller (January 31, 1912 – April 1, 2000) was a Soviet and Russian stage and film actor of Austrian origin.

== Biography ==
In 1932 he graduated from the Academy of Trade in Graz, Austria. He took part in anti-fascist activities. From 1936 he lived and worked in Moscow. Member of the World War II in the ranks of the Soviet Army. Honored with Order of the Patriotic War 2nd Class.

He made his film debut in 1959 in the film by Ilya Gurin The Golden Eshelon. Knausmüller starred in 61 feature films in total.

Erwin Knausmüller died in Moscow on January 4, 2000. Buried in Moscow at the Vvedenskoye Cemetery.

== Selected filmography ==
- The Golden Eshelon (1959) as Friedrich
- Farewell, Doves (1960) as episode
- Peace to Him Who Enters (1961) as german officer
- Judgment of the Mad (1961) as episode
- At Your Threshold (1962) as episode
- Hello, Children! (1962) as Professor Eisenach
- The Third Half (1962) as Major Heinz
- Attack and Retreat (1964) as German colonel
- War and Peace (1965–1967) as Franz von Weyrother
- Royal Regatta (1966) as rewarding man
- Anna Karenina (1967) as Vronsky's steward
- Woman's World (1967) as German corporal
- The Road to 'Saturn' (1967) as German major
- The Secret Agent's Blunder (1968) as Sebastian, Federal Intelligence Service agent
- Liberation (1968–1971) as German general
- Tchaikovsky (1969) as Countess von Mack's steward
- Secret Agent's Destiny (1970) as Sebastian
- The Saplings (1972) as American tourist
- Taming of the Fire (1972) as general
- No Return (1973) as episode
- The Flight of Mr. McKinley (1975) as company guest
- The Beginning of the Legend (1976) as German officer
- Front Beyond the Front Line (1977) as General Schwarzenberg
- Where Were You, Odysseus? (1978) as von Arvid
- TASS Is Authorized to Declare... (1984) as US ambassador to the USSR
- Battle of Moscow (1985) as German officer in Yasnaya Polyana
- To Award (Posthumously) (1986) as German officer
- Visit to Minotaur (1987) as Franz Colwood, Swiss businessman
