= Georgy Drozd =

Soviet and Ukrainian actor

- Born: Georgy Ivanovich Drozd; May 28, 1941; Kyiv, Ukrainian SSR, Soviet Union
- Died: June 9, 2015 (aged 74); Kyiv, Ukraine
- Education: Kyiv National I. K. Karpenko-Kary Theatre, Cinema and Television University
- Occupation: Actor
- Years active: 1962–2014

Georgy Ivanovich Drozd (Ukrainian: Георгій Іванович Дрозд; 28 May 1941, Kyiv – 10 June 2015, Kyiv) was a Soviet and Ukrainian actor, member of the National Union of Cinematographers of Ukraine. People's Artist of Ukraine (1999).

== Biography ==
Born May 28, 1941 in Kyiv in the family working. He graduated from the Kyiv National I. K. Karpenko-Kary Theatre, Cinema and Television University.

He worked at the Lesya Ukrainka National Academic Theater of Russian Drama.

From 1963 to 1978, he was an actor at the Odesa Regional Academic Drama Theatre.

From 1978 to 1984, he was an actor at the Mikhail Chekhov Riga Russian Theatre.

From 1985 to 1988, he was an actor at the Sovremennik Theatre.

From 1988 to 2005, he worked at the Lesya Ukrainka National Academic Theater of Russian Drama in Kyiv.

His son is actor Maxim Drozd.

== Death ==
In 2013 the actor became seriously ill. On June 10, 2015, Georgy Drozd died after a long illness.

== Selected filmography ==
- Faithfulness (1965)
- Countermeasure (1974)
- Where Were You, Odysseus? (1978)
- Twice Born (1983)
- Charlotte's Necklace (1984)
- To Award (Posthumously) (1986)
- Disintegration (1990)
- Dark Waters (1994)
- Cinderella (2002)
- Muhtar's Return (2005)
- A Second Before... (2007)
- House with Lilies (2014)
