= Gennady Nilov =

Russian actor (1936–2025)

Gennady Petrovich Nilov (Russian: Генна́дий Петро́вич Ни́лов; 1 October 1936 – 29 September 2025) was a Soviet and Russian actor.

== Background ==
Gennady Nilov was born in 1936 in the town of Luga, Leningrad Oblast (now St. Petersburg). His father was a clerk, his mother was a cook. Because of the constant changes of residence, the young Gennady had to study three times in the first grade and for this reason he completed his first grade only at the age of 9 in Kyiv.

His uncle on mother's side is Pavel Kadochnikov. After the war, Nilov's family had been sharing the apartment with the famous actor for some time. It was at that time that Gennady expressed his interest in acting. While studying at school, he was the head of the drama club, he used to stage performances and pick costumes for actors himself. When Pavel Kadochnikov was shooting for the movie Secret Agent, Gennady took part as an extra in the movie.

== Career ==
Gennady Nilov graduated from Leningrad state Institute of Theatre, Music and Cinema in 1959. He was appointed a member of the staff of Lenfilm studio, where he worked for 34 years. Popularity came to him after the movie Three Plus Two, where he played the role of sullen physicist.

Gennady Nilov has more than 40 roles played in the cinema.

== Personal life and death ==
First time he got married, while studying at the Institute to the actress Svetlana Zhgun, who studied at the same institute. But their marriage did not last long. He met his second wife (Galina) in 1961. The couple had two sons – Alexey and Anton. Alexey is now a well-known actor of theater and cinema, and Anton works in a firm for the production of automobile tires. Nilov died on 29 September 2025, at the age of 88.

== Filmography ==
- Secret Agent (1947)
- Life in Your Hands (1958)
- The Overcoat (1959)
- Virgin Soil Upturned (1959)
- Iriston's Son (1959)
- Three Plus Two (1963)
- Footprint in the Ocean (1964)
- Nights of Farewell (1965)
- The Snow Maiden (1968)
- Hail, Mary! (1970)
- Mission in Kabul (1970)
- Farewell to St. Petersburg (1972)
- Captain Nemo (1975)
- The Captivating Star of Happiness (1975)
- I Shall Never Forget (1983)
- Anna Karamazoff (1991)
- The White Horse (1993)

== See also ==
- Cinema of the Soviet Union
- List of Soviet films of 1961
