= Blue Road (disambiguation) =

Blue Road is an album by Canadian country rock group Blue Rodeo.

(The) Blue Road(s) may also refer to:

- The Blue Road, an EP by Busby Marou, a duo from Queensland, Australia
- Blue road, an alternative term for a back road in North Carolina, United States
- Blue Road: The Edna O'Brien Story, a documentary about Irish writer Edna O'Brien
- Blue Roads, 1947 Soviet war-adventure-drama film
- The Blue Road (TV series), 2026 South Korean Netflix series

== See also ==
- Finnish regional road 551, part of the Blue Highway from Norway to Russia
