= Alyonka =

1961 film

- Russian poster
- Russian: Алёнка
- Directed by: Boris Barnet
- Written by: Sergei Antonov
- Starring: Natalya Ovodova; Irina Zarubina; Vasiliy Shukshin; Nikolay Bogolyubov; Erast Garin
- Cinematography: Igor Chernykh
- Edited by: L. Galkova
- Music by: Kirill Molchanov
- Production company: Mosfilm
- Release date: 1961
- Running time: 86 minutes
- Country: Soviet Union
- Language: Russian

Alyonka (Russian: Алёнка) is a 1961 Soviet comedy film directed by Boris Barnet.

The film tells about one of the key stages of the organization of the socialist system in Russia, which is shown through the eyes of a girl named Alyonka.

== Plot ==
The film tells the stories of people who came to the Kazakh steppes in the mid-1950s to participate in the Virgin Lands Campaign.

During the harvest season, nine-year-old Alyonka leaves her parents and travels 500 kilometers to the district center to continue her schooling, as the newly established state farm in the Virgin Lands area has no school yet. Along the way, her fellow travelers share stories of their lives and loves during the long journey.

The film is structured as a series of vignettes, with each tale recounted by the characters brought to life through Alyonka’s childlike perspective.

One story follows Elsa Kalnyn (Anda Zaice), a young dentist who moves from Riga to work in the Virgin Lands after graduating from medical school. Facing challenges such as the lack of a proper office and dental chair in the state farm’s medical post, Elsa sets off on an adventurous trip to the district center of Aryk to procure the necessary equipment.

Alyonka herself recounts a humorous episode where she decided to earn five failing grades at school, nearly driving her kind and elderly teacher, Vitaminych (Erast Garin), to despair.

Another tale features Lida (Maya Menglet), a city girl from Moscow, who grows bored with life on a Komsomol construction site in Belogorsk, where her tractor-driver husband, Stepan Revun (Vasily Shukshin), had taken her. The couple moves to the Virgin Lands, but their marital struggles persist, further complicated by the absence of a registry office (ZAGS) in the state farm.

Lastly, the story of Vasilysa Petrovna (Irina Zarubina), a kindhearted Russian woman, is marked by tragedy. Her daughter Liza (Natalya Seleznyova) dies heroically while trying to save the seed reserves. Despite the loss, Vasilysa’s other daughter, living in a Siberian village, resolves to take her late sister’s place and come to the Virgin Lands.

== Cast ==
- Natalya Ovodova as Alyonka Muratova (as Natasha Ovodova)
- Irina Zarubina as Vasilisa Petrovna
- Vasiliy Shukshin as Stepan Revan (as V. Shukshin)
- Nikolay Bogolyubov as Dmitri Prokofitch
- Erast Garin as Konstantin Venyaminovich
- Nikolay Kryuchkov as Roman Semyonovich
- Evgeniy Shutov
- Natalya Seleznyova as Elizaveta
