= A Good Lad =

- Russian: Славный малый
- Directed by: Boris Barnet
- Written by: Aleksei Kapler; Pyotr Pavlenko
- Starring: Evgeniy Grigorev; O. Yakunina; Ekaterina Sipavina; Viktor Dobrovolsky; Nikolay Bogolyubov; L. Tkachev; N. Stepanov
- Cinematography: Sergei Ivanov
- Music by: Nikita Bogoslovskiy; Nikolai Kryukov
- Production company: TsOKS
- Release date: 1942
- Running time: 100 minutes
- Country: Soviet Union

A Good Lad, (Russian: Славный малый) is a 1942 Soviet musical film directed by Boris Barnet.

== Plot ==
The film tells about a pilot from France, who was shot down by the Germans and wound up in a partisan detachment.

== Cast ==
- Evgeniy Grigorev as Nevskiy (as E. Grigorev)
- O. Yakunina as Evdokia
- Ekaterina Sipavina as Katia (as Yelena Sipavina)
- Viktor Dobrovolsky as Claude
- Nikolay Bogolyubov as Doronine
- L. Tkachev as Ichoukine
- N. Stepanov as Vasya
