= Nina Arkhipova =

Soviet and Russian actress

- Russian: Нина Николаевна Архипова
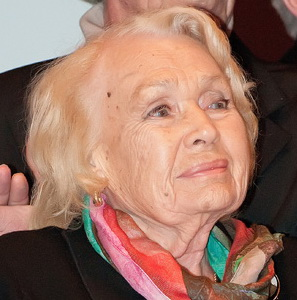
- Born: Nina Nikolayevna Arkhipova; 1 May 1921; Omsk, Soviet Russia
- Died: 24 April 2016 (aged 94); Moscow, Russia
- Education: Russian Academy of Theatre Arts; Moscow State University
- Spouses: Alexander Golubentsev; Boris Gorbatov; Georgy Menglet
- Children: 3
- Parent(s): Nikolai Matveyevich Arkhipov; Maria Nikolayevna Arkhipova

Nina Nikolayevna Arkhipova (Russian: Нина Николаевна Архипова; 1 May 1921 – 24 April 2016) was a Soviet and Russian film and stage actress. She was a People's Artist of the RSFSR (1988).

== Biography ==
She was born in Omsk. The family subsequently moved to Moscow.

Her parents were Nikolai Matveyevich Arkhipov, a Siberian native of Irkutsk, and Maria Nikolayevna from St. Petersburg, who was shot when Nina was ten years old.

As a child, Nina Arkhipova loved to sing, dance, and play the piano. Living in Zamoskvorechye, she frequented the theater and began to think about the acting profession. After high school, she decided to apply not only to the studio theater – at the Vakhtangov and the Maly Theater and Russian Academy of Theatre Arts, but also to the law faculty of Moscow State University. Arkhipova passed exams and was accepted everywhere. She decided to stop the choice on the Boris Shchukin Theatre Institute at the Vakhtangov Theater. Her teacher was the famous Cecilia Mansurova. In 1945 she graduated from drama school. From 1943 to 1951, she worked at the Vakhtangov Theatre.

From 1951 till 2016, she was a leading actress of the Moscow Satire Theatre. Over the years, she performed over 100 roles.

She made her debut in 1946 in the drama Aleksandr Stolper's Our Heart. Four years later, she played Faith in Boris Barnet's Generous Summer. This role is considered one of the most important in her career. It became widely known with the release in theaters of the teleplay Awake and Sing!

In 2014, the actress published a book, Life in the Given Circumstances.

She died in 2016.

== Family ==
- First husband – composer Alexander Golubentsev (1899–1979).
  - Daughter – Natalia Golubentseva (born 1942) – Honored Artist of Russia, more than 30 years working in television, voiced Stepashka (Степашка) in the television show Spokoynoy nochi, malyshi!, Winner of the TEFI. She also voiced Khyrusha temporarily after the death of her co-star Natalia Derzhavina.
- Second husband – writer Boris Gorbatov (1908–1954).
  - Daughter – Elena Ermakova (Gorbatova) (born 1953) – English Teacher
  - Son – Mikhail Gorbatov (1953–2017) – doctor-kardioreanimatolog
- Third husband – actor Georgy Menglet (1912–2001)

== Selected filmography ==
Year	Title	Role
1951	Bountiful Summer	Vera Groshko
1971	Oh, That Nastya!	Ryabinina
1974	Rise and Shine!	Erzhi
1978	Errors of Youth	soldier mom
1983	Quarantine	Aunt Polina
1984	Two Hussars	Older Anna Zaytseva
1984	Extend, Extend, Fascination...	Elena Georgievna
1994	Burnt by the Sun	Yelena Mikhailovna
2011	Burnt by the Sun 2	Yelena Mikhaylovna

== Recognition and awards ==
- Honored Artist of the RSFSR (1967)
- People's Artist of the RSFSR (1988)
- Order of Friendship (1996)
- Medal "In Commemoration of the 850th Anniversary of Moscow"я
