= Nights of Farewell =

- Russian: Третья молодость
- Directed by: Jean Dréville; Isaak Menaker
- Written by: Paul Andréota; Aleksandr Galich; Pierre Guilbert
- Starring: Gilles Ségal; Oleg Strizhenov; Nikolay Cherkasov
- Cinematography: Michel Kelber; Konstantin Ryzhov
- Music by: Yuri Prokofiev; Nadezhda Simonyan
- Release date: 1965
- Running time: 130 minutes
- Countries: Soviet Union; France
- Language: Russian

Nights of Farewell (Russian: Третья молодость; lit. Third Youth) is a 1965 Soviet-French biographical drama film directed by Isaak Menaker and Jean Dréville.

== Plot ==
The film tells about the young dancer Marius Petipa, who is invited to St. Petersburg, which will completely change his life.

== Cast ==
- Gilles Ségal as Marius Petipa
- Oleg Strizhenov as Pyotr Ilyich Tchaikovsky
- Natalya Velichko as Mashenka Surovshchikova
- Nikolay Cherkasov as Aleksandr Gedeonov (voiced by Vladimir Tatosov)
- Marianna Strizhenova as Gedeonov's wife
- Nikolay Trofimov as Petrov, theater worker
- Gennady Nilov as Lev Ivanov
- Alla Larionova as Lyubov Leonidovna
- Vladislav Strzhelchik as Nicholas I of Russia
- Tatyana Piletskaya as pedagogue
- Jacques Ferrière as Anton Minkh
- Pierre Bertin as Petipa's father
- Viviane Gosset as Petipa's mother
- Alexandre Rignault as Bigorne
- Vladimir Yemelyanov as Ivan Vsevolozhsky
