= Pavel Kadochnikov =

Soviet and Russian actor, film director, screenwriter and pedagogue

- Павел Кадочников
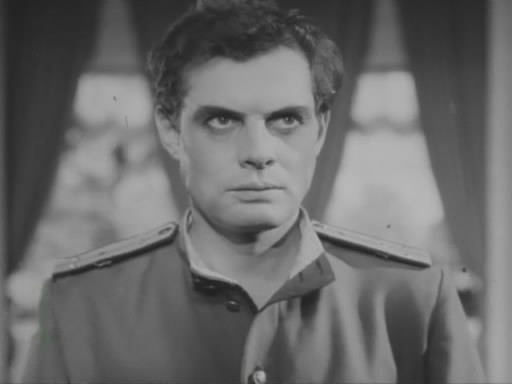
- Kadochnikov in Tale of a True Man (1948)
- Born: Pavel Petrovich Kadochnikov; 29 July 1915; Petrograd, Russian Empire
- Died: 2 May 1988 (aged 72); Leningrad, RSFSR, Soviet Union
- Occupations: Actor, film director, screenwriter, theater pedagogue
- Years active: 1935–1987
- Relatives: Gennady Nilov (nephew); Nina Bergman (granddaughter)

Pavel Petrovich Kadochnikov (Russian: Павел Петрович Кадочников; 29 July [O.S. 16 July] 1915 – 2 May 1988) was a Soviet and Russian actor, film director, screenwriter and pedagogue. He was named People's Artist of the USSR in 1979 and Hero of Socialist Labour in 1985.

== Biography ==
Pavel Kadochnikov was born in Petrograd in 1915. In 1927, he entered a children's artistic studio, dreaming to become a professional artist, but, because of the severe illness of his father, Pavel, as the elder in the family, was forced to become the apprentice to a metal craftsman. However, he continued to study in the studio. In 1929, he entered the actor's department of theatrical school of TYuZ. In 1935, he graduated from Leningrad Theatrical Institute and until 1944 was an actor in Leningrad's New TYuZ.

He began to act in the cinema in 1935. His first role was Mikhas in the film Maturity. Kadochnikov was not pleased the way he looked on the screen in his early roles, and he decided to never play in the cinema again. He did not stand by this decision. In 1937, he accepted Sergei Yutkevich's invitation and appeared in a minor role in the film The Man with the Gun. In many plays he performed several roles; in one of them he performed at once eight roles. In 1940, he played the roles of worker Lenka Sukhov and writer Maxim Gorky in the film Yakov Sverdlov directed by Sergei Yutkevich. In Ivan the Terrible by Sergei Eisenstein he performed the role of Ivan's cousin, the boyar Vladimir Staritsky.

His actor's range can be seen in his lyric roles (Anton Ivanovich is Angry, The Tamer of Tigers) and in the role of Major Fedotov in the Secret Agent by Boris Barnet. The role of Major Fedotov was a cult character of Soviet cinema which mixed the pathetics, manly charm and irony. For the roles he took in the patriotic movies he won the Stalin Prize (in 1948 for the Secret Agent, in 1949 for the role of Aleksey Maresyev in the Tale of a True Man, in 1951 for the role of Kovshov in the film Far from Moscow). Time and again actor appeared in the role of Maxim Gorky. From the 1960s onwards, he began to move away from patriotic roles.

In 1965 Kadochnikov directed his first film Musicians of One Regiment together with Gennadi Kazansky. This film is about the Civil War. It showed his interest in folklore heroes. In 1968 he filmed the fairy tale of Alexander Ostrovsky, titled The Snow Maiden (he also played the role of Berendey). In 1970-1980s, he did roles from the classical repertoire: Triletsky in the An Unfinished Piece for Mechanical Piano, Prince Kuchumov in Easy Money, and the picturesque figures of "Russian old men" (eternal grandfather in Siberiade and uncle Roman in The Seagulls Did Not Fly Here). In Lenin in Paris he plays Paul Lafargue. In later years he played in the character roles (Adventures of Sherlock Holmes, Last Visit); staged films I Shall Never Forget (about the fate of Soviet soldier and his wife, separated by war) and Silver Strings (about the Russian virtuoso balalaika-player Vasily Andreyev).

He is the grandfather of the Danish actress, singer, songwriter and model Nina Bergman and the uncle of the Russian actor Gennady Nilov.

== Filmography ==
=== As actor ===
- Yakov Sverdlov (1940) as Maxim Gorky
- Anton Ivanovich Is Angry (1941) as Aleksey Petrovich Mukhin
- The Defense of Tsaritsyn (1942) as Rudnev
- Ivan the Terrible (1944–1958) as Vladimir Andreyevich Staritsky and Chaldean Clown
- Hello Moscow! (1945) as Konstantin Nikolaevich Zlatogorov (uncredited)
- Robinson Crusoe (1947) as Robinson Crusoe
- Secret Agent (1947) as mayor Aleksey Fedotov – Stalin Prize second degree (1948)
- Blue Roads (1948) as Sergey Ratanov
- Tale of a True Man (1948) as Aleksey Maresyev – Stalin Prize second degree (1949)
- Far from Moscow (1950) as Kovshov – Stalin Prize first degree (1951)
- A Big Family (1954) as Skobolev
- The Boys from Leningrad (1954) as Svetlanov
- Tamer of Tigers (1955) as Fyodor Yermolayev
- Road to Life (1955) as Maxim Gorky
- The Slowest Train (1963) as captain Sergey Sergeyev
- Snow Maiden (1969) as Tsar Berendey
- Farewell to St. Petersburg (1972) as Pavel Maksimov
- Winds Blow in Baku (1974) as Kastanov
- An Unfinished Piece for Mechanical Piano (1977) as Ivan Ivanovich Triletskiy
- The Seagulls Did Not Fly Here (1978) as Roman
- Life of Beethoven (1978, TV Movie) as Romain Rolland
- Siberiade (1979) as prophetic old man
- A Few Days from the Life of I. I. Oblomov (1980) as Pavel Petrovich
- Story of an Unknown Man (1980) as Graf Orlov
- Santa Esperansa (1980) as Don Lorenzo
- Lenin in Paris (1981) as Paul Lafargue
- The Treasures of Agra (1983, (TV Mini-Series) as major Sholto
- Quarantine (1983) as great-grandfather
- The Blonde Around the Corner (1984) as corresponding member Ogurtsov
- Dark Eyes (1987) as 1e Funzionario Pietroburgo
- Silver Strings (1987) as Antip Savelich

=== As director and scenario ===
- Musicians of One Regiment (1965) as director
- The Snow Maiden (1968) as director and scenario
- I Shall Never Forget (1983) as director and scenario
- Silver Strings (1987) as director and scenario
