= Mikhail Bleiman =

Soviet screenwriter

Mikhail Yurievich Bleiman (born 19 May 1904, Rostov-on-Don — 3 December 1973, Moscow) was a Russian and Soviet screenwriter and film critic.

== Life and career ==
Bleiman studied history and philology in Rostov between 1920 and 1923 and at the Valerii Briusov Higher Institute for Literature and Art in Moscow in 1923–1924. He worked as a journalist before specializing in screenplays. Bleiman’s first two scripts were made into satirical shorts: History of an Advance Payment (Istoriia odnogo avansa, 1924), a morality tale about the dangers of alcohol abuse, and The Adventures of Vanka Gvozd (Pokhozhdeniia Vanki Gvozdia, 1924), a mockery of the Orthodox Church. Both were produced by a Komsomol-based company in Bleiman’s hometown Rostov-on-the Don and directed by Manuel Bolshintsov (1902–1954). In 1924, together with M.V. Bolshintsov, A.I. Grisenko, S.I. Brumer and other Rostov Komsomol members, he created the only non-governmental Komsomol film studio in Russia, Yuvkinokomol. At this film studio, according to his script, in 1926 his first full-length (7 parts, 2289 meters) feature military adventure film "Order no. ..." about the exploits of young Rostov revolutionaries was shot.

Bleiman’s most well-known work is the screenplay for Fridrikh Ermler’s The Great Citizen (1937–1939, co-authored with Bolshintsov), a reflection of Stalinist strategies within the Bolshevik Party in the 1930s, showing Joseph Stalin’s struggle against the “leftist and rightist oppositions".

He was one of the creators of the script of the cult film "The Scout's Feat", for which he was awarded the Stalin Prize in 1948.

Bleiman was also successful with war dramas, authoring or co-authoring the scripts for Yuli Raizman’s Moscow Sky (1944), Leonid Lukov’s It Happened in the Donbas (1945), and most notably for Boris Barnet’s Secret Agent (with [[Konstantin Isaev]]), a spy film that won both the director and the screenwriters Stalin Prizes. Bleiman was accused of “formalism” in the early 1930s. In 1948–1949, despite his loyal service to Stalin and the Communist Party, he became one of the major targets of the anti-Semitic campaign “against cosmopolitanism.” Among his noteworthy later screenwriting efforts are the Civil War story Restless Youth (Trevozhnaia molodost’, 1954)—the directing debut of Aleksandr Alov and Vladimir Naumov — and a hugely popular espionage dilogy, The Road to 'Saturn' (1967) and The End of Saturn (1968).

He was also a prolific film critic who regularly published his views on ideological and aesthetic aspects of Soviet cinema.

== Filmography ==
- "Order no.(number)..." (1926)
- Mutiny (1928)
- My Motherland (1933)
- Journey to Arzrum (1936)
- The Great Citizen (1938)
- Nebo Moskvy (1944)
- It Happened in the Donbas (1945)
- Secret Agent (The Scout's Feat) (1947)
- Victorious Return (1947)
- Three Encounters (1948)
- The Road to 'Saturn' (1967)

== Literature ==
- Sergei Yutkevich (1987). Encyclopedic Dictionary of Cinema. Moscow: Soviet Encyclopedia. p. 96.
- Mikhail Bleiman (1973). О кино - свидетельские показания [About Cinema - A Witnesses Account]. Moscow: Iksusstvo.
