= Nikolai Khokhlov =

KGB officer who defected to the US (1922–2007)

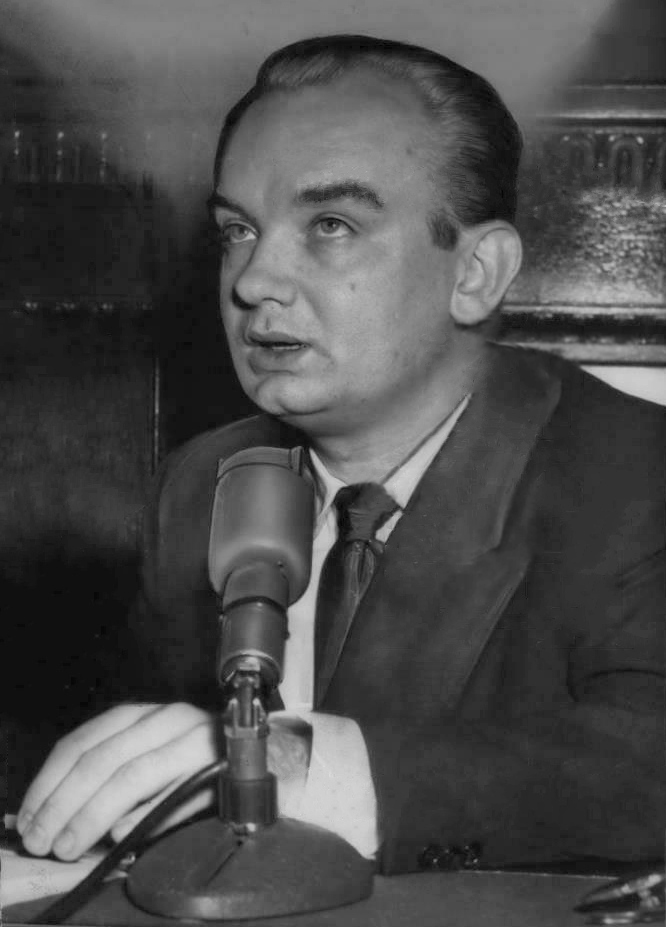
- Khokhlov at U.S. Senate Internal Security Subcommittee in 1954
- Born: 7 June 1922; Nizhny Novgorod, Russian SFSR
- Died: 17 September 2007 (aged 85); San Bernardino, California, U.S.
- Occupation: KGB spy

Nikolai Yevgenievich Khokhlov (Russian: Николай Евгеньевич Хохлов; 7 June 1922 – 17 September 2007) was a KGB officer who defected to the United States in 1954. He testified about KGB activities. The KGB unsuccessfully tried to kill him with poison in 1957.

== Family background ==
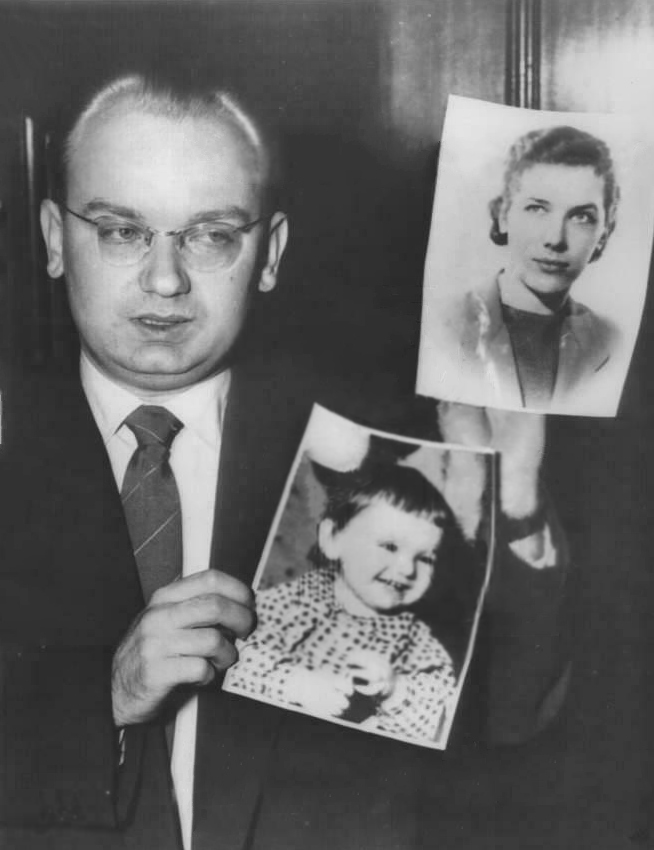
Khokhlov in 1954, holding photos of his first wife and son

Nikolai Khoklov was born in 1922, in Nizhny Novgorod. Khokhlov's parents divorced when he was very young. He was not well-acquainted with his father, who later served as a commissar in the Red Army. During the Battle for Moscow, the elder Khokhlov was transferred to a penal battalion because he had made unfavourable remarks about Joseph Stalin. Khokhlov's father died in the battalion.

His stepfather, a lawyer, volunteered to defend Moscow in 1941 and died in action almost immediately. As Khokhlov later put it, "The army needed cannon fodder".

As a teen, Khoklov was a local actor and whistler, who originally tried enlisting on the frontlines, but was originally rejected due to his bad eyesight.

== NKVD career ==
In October 1941, Khokhlov, then 19 years old, was a member of an NKVD quartet who were trained to commit a spectacular attack against Nazi officers during their victory celebration in the occupied Moscow. The mastermind behind the plan was Mikhail Maklyarskiy, a senior NKVD official. The four young agents would have played a vaudeville group on the celebration. Khokhlov was chosen for his role on his whistling abilities. During the training, he had his first great romance with fellow agent, singer Tasya Ignatova. After the German retreat from the outskirts of Moscow, the deadly show was cancelled.

Nikolai Khokhlov was a member of a successful military unit that fought behind the enemy lines during World War II. He was disguised as a Nazi officer after parachuting into German-occupied Belarus. He played a part in the assassination of Wilhelm Kube, the Nazi Gauleiter of Belarus. After the war, Khokhlov became the prototype for the main character in a 1947 Soviet film, Feat of a Scout ("Подвиг разведчика").

== Assassination mission ==
In 1954, Khokhlov was sent by the KGB to Frankfurt to supervise two men whose task was to kill Georgiy Okolovich, a chairman of the National Alliance of Russian Solidarists. He discussed the situation with his wife, Yana, who said, "If this man is killed, you will be a murderer. I cannot be the wife of a murderer" and decided not to follow the order. Khokhlov went to Okolovich's flat and told him: "Georgiy Sergeyevich, I have come to you from Moscow. The Central Committee of the Communist Party of the Soviet Union has ordered your assassination. The murder is entrusted to my group... I can’t let this murder happen." Khokhlov defected to the United States following his failure to carry out the assassination order. In retaliation, his wife in the Soviet Union was arrested and sentenced to five years of involuntary settlement.

== Poisoning by thallium ==
Khokhlov was treated for thallium poisoning in Frankfurt in 1957, as a result of a failed assassination attempt by the Thirteenth Department of the KGB. This case is often claimed to be the first radiological attack by the KGB, especially when comparison with the poisoning of Alexander Litvinenko is drawn, although it remains unclear what isotope was used, if any. Former KGB officer Stanislav Lekarev claimed, however, that Khokhlov was poisoned by radioactive polonium (not thallium), exactly as Litvinenko was. Litvinenko's poisoning was also initially mistaken for thallium.

== Life in the United States ==
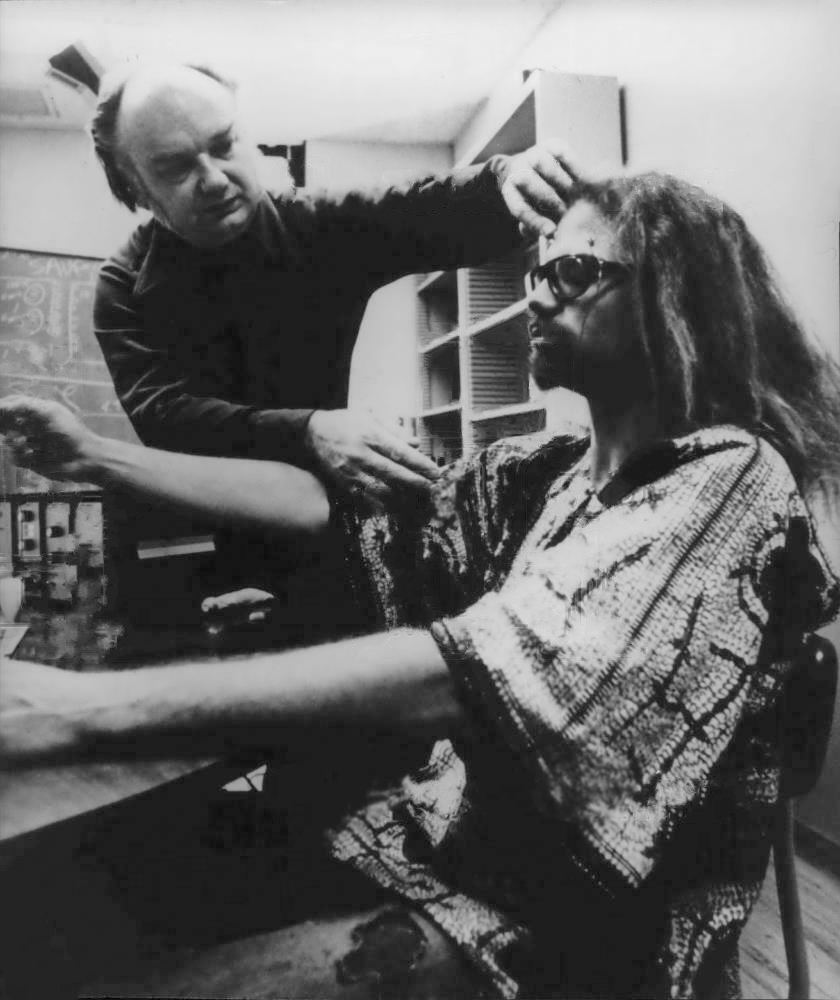
Khokhlov carrying out psychology research at California State University in 1975

After graduating with a PhD from Duke University, Khokhlov taught undergraduate and graduate psychology classes at California State University, San Bernardino from 1968 to 1992. He retired as a professor emeritus in 1993.

In the United States, Khokhlov married again. With his second wife Tanya, he had two daughters and a son, Misha, who died several years later due to a kidney failure.

In 1992, Russian president Boris Yeltsin pardoned Khokhlov. The same year he returned to Moscow for a short stay, for the first time since the 1950s. He later made an e-mail contact with, then eventually met, his son in Russia of whom he had not been previously aware.

Nikolai Khokhlov died of a heart attack in San Bernardino, California, in September 2007. He was buried next to the grave of his son.

== See also ==
- Alexander Litvinenko poisoning
- List of Eastern Bloc defectors

== Books ==
- Nikolai Evgenievich Khokhlov. In the name of conscience . Translated by Emily Kingsbery. New York : David McKay, 1959. In the name of conscience (Russian)
- Boris Volodarsky. Nikolai Khokhlov ("Whistler"), Self-Esteem with a Halo . Vienna-London : Borwall Verlag, 2005. (English)
