= The Great Citizen =

The Great Citizen (Великий гражданин)
- Directed by: Fridrikh Ermler
- Written by: Mikhail Bleiman; Manuel Bolshintsov; Fridrikh Ermler
- Starring: Nikolay Bogolyubov
- Edited by: Ye. Makhankova
- Music by: Dmitri Shostakovich
- Production company: Lenfilm
- Release dates: 13 February 1938; 27 November 1939
- Running time: 252 minutes
- Country: Soviet Union
- Language: Russian

The Great Citizen (Russian: Великий гражданин, romanized: Velikiy grazhdanin) is a 1938 Soviet biopic film directed by Fridrikh Ermler.

A fictionalized biography of Sergei Kirov (the character's name is Shakhov), the film was intended as ideological support for the Great Purges; it depicts life in USSR during the 1920s and 1930s.

== Plot ==
The film follows the life of Pyotr Shakhov (played by Nikolai Bogolyubov), a prominent CPSU(b) leader, across two pivotal time periods: 1925 and 1934 (depicted in the first and second parts, respectively). The story focuses on Shakhov's relentless struggle against members of the Trotskyist-Zinovievite bloc and their leader, Kartashov (Ivan Bersenyev). The narrative is filled with intense dialogues and sharp debates between the ideological adversaries.

Shakhov identifies the director of the "Krasny Metallist" factory, Avdeev, as an opponent of innovation and socialist competition. He replaces Avdeev with a young, committed Bolshevik, Nadya Kolesnikova (Zoya Fyodorova). His instincts prove correct when Avdeev is exposed as a saboteur.

The film reaches its climax with Shakhov's fiery speeches at a factory rally and a conference of labor leaders. His words inspire workers and gain the support of Comrade Maksim, a Central Committee representative (Boris Chirkov). However, Shakhov's enemies within the party are not idle. In the final scene, Shakhov is assassinated by a gunman hiding behind a door in the cultural center he was visiting.

At Shakhov's graveside, Soviet citizens vow to carry on his work and ensure that no enemy will escape justice.

== Production ==
Stalin made direct interventions in Mikhail Bleiman and Manuel Bolshintsov's screenplay. During the making of The Great Citizen four people associated with it were arrested. In the press Ermler and his screenwriters were obliged to condemn the "wrecker" leadership of Lenfilm, most importantly Piotrovski.

== Cast ==
- Nikolay Bogolyubov - Shakhov - the great citizen
- Ivan Bersenev - Kartashov - the conspirator
- Oleg Zhakov - Borovsky - the accomplice
- Zoya Fyodorova - Nadya
- Boris Poslavsky - Sizov
- Aleksandr Zrazhevsky - Dubok
- Boris Chirkov - Maksim, the investigator
- Pyotr Kirillov - Briantsev - the assassin
- Yefim Altus - Katz - Shakhov's helper
- Yelena Yegorova
- Yevgeni Pankov
- Yevgeni Nemchenko - Dronov
- Georgi Semyonov - Kolesnikov
- V. Kiselyov - Gladkikh
- A. Polibin - Solovyev
- Sergei Kurilov
- N. Raiskaya-Dore - Shakhov's mother
- Natalya Rashevskaya - Olga
- K. Ryabinkin - Kryuchkov
