= Secret Agent (1947 film) =

- Directed by: Boris Barnet
- Written by: Mikhail Bleiman; Konstantin Isayev; Mikhail Maklyarsky
- Produced by: Dovzhenko Film Studios
- Starring: Pavel Kadochnikov; Amvrosy Buchma; Viktor Dobrovolsky; Dmitri Milyutenko; Sergey Martinson
- Cinematography: Daniil Demutsky
- Edited by: N. Gorbenko
- Music by: D. Klebanov; Oskar Sandler
- Release date: 1947
- Running time: 87 minutes
- Country: Soviet Union
- Language: Russian

Secret Agent (in Russian: «Подвиг разведчика», romanized: Podvig razvedchika, in Ukrainian: «Подвиг розвідника», romanized: Podvyg rozvidnyka - "a heroic deed of an intelligence agent") is a 1947 Soviet spy film directed by Boris Barnet and based on the novel The Deed Remains Unknown (Russian: «Подвиг остается неизвестным») by Mikhail Maklyarsky. The film stars Pavel Kadochnikov in the leading role. Secret Agent is also known as Secret Mission, Secrets of Counter-Espionage, The Scout's Exploit.

It was the first film about the actions of Soviet intelligence officers behind enemy lines in World War II. The film originated the spy genre in Soviet cinema and had a great influence on all subsequent Soviet spy films, including Seventeen Moments of Spring. It is based on real events from the biography of Nikolai Khokhlov.

The film was the leader of Soviet distribution in 1947 and had 22.73 million viewers.

== Plot ==
Pavel Kadochnikov (right) in Secret Agent (1947)

Soviet intelligence officer Aleksei Fedotov departs for German-occupied Vinnytsia disguised as a German officer named Heinrich Eckert. His purpose is to obtain the secret correspondence of General Kuhn with the Hitler's headquarters. When his radio operator, sent to Aleksei, is executed, Fedotov is forced to search for a contact through the local underground, but accidentally he discovers that one of the underground resistance fighters is a provocateur.

== Cast ==
- Pavel Kadochnikov as major Aleksei Fedotov
- Amvrosy Buchma as Grigory Leschuk
- Viktor Dobrovolsky as Chief
- Dmitri Milyutenko as Berezhnoy
- Sergey Martinson as Willi Pommer
- Mikhail Romanov as Erich von Rummelsburg
- Pyotr Arzhanov as Karpovsky
- Boris Barnet as general von Kuhn
- Yelena Izmailova as Theresa Gruber
- Valentina Ulesova as Nina
- Sergei Petrov as Astakhov
- Viktor Khalatov as Friedrich Pommer
- Valeria Draga-Soumarokova as Frau Pommer
- Aleksei Bykov as Medvedev
- Gennady Nilov as episode

== Awards ==
- 1948 - Stalin Prize of 2nd degree to director, designer (Morits Umansky), scenarios and Pavel Kadochnikov.
