= Nebo Moskvy =

- Film poster
- Russian: Небо Москвы
- Directed by: Yuli Raizman
- Written by: Mikhail Bleiman; Manuel Bolshintsov
- Produced by: Yuli Raizman
- Starring: Pyotr Aleynikov; Nikolay Bogolyubov; Ivan Kuznetsov; Nina Mazaeva; Nikolai Shamin; Pyotr Sobolevsky; Evgeniy Grigorev]; Fyodor Ivanov
- Cinematography: Yevgeniy Nikolayevich Andrikanis
- Production company: Mosfilm
- Distributed by: Artkino Pictures
- Release dates: 1 June 1944 (Rus); 20 January 1945 (USA)
- Running time: 88 minutes
- Country: Soviet Union
- Language: Russian

Nebo Moskvy, (Russian: Небо Москвы) (aka The Moscow Sky and Moscow Skies) is a 1944 Soviet World War II film directed by Yuli Raizman. The film is a Soviet-era wartime film depicting the air defence of Moscow in 1941.

== Plot ==
In September 1941, Lt. Ilya Streltsov (Pyotr Aleynikov), says goodbye to his parents, Streltsov's father (Nikolai Shamin) and mother (Aleksandra Salnikova).

After graduating from a flying school, Streltsov goes to the air regiment consisting of fighter pilots that defend Moscow, the capital of the Soviet Union. The air regiment is under the command of Lt. Col. Balashev (Nikolay Bogolyubov).

Streltsov's love is Zoya Vladimirovna (Nina Mazaeva) who serves as a combat medic in the same unit. He thinks that she is more interested in decorated aces than in a rookie. Capt. Goncharov (Pyotr Sobolevsky), Sr. Lt. Cherbina (Ivan Kuznetsov) and Sr. Lt. Solovyov (Evgeniy Nemchenko) have already become heroes.

Soon Streltsov proves to be a skilled and brave pilot, and he is convinced that Zoya still loves him.

== Cast ==
- Pyotr Aleynikov as Lt. Ilya Streltsov
- Nikolay Bogolyubov as Lt. Col. Balashev
- Ivan Kuznetsov as 1st Lt. Cherbina
- Nina Mazaeva as Zoya Vladimirovna
- Nikolai Shamin as Ivan Ilich Streltsov
- Aleksandra Salnikova as Streltsov's Mother
- Pyotr Sobolevsky as Capt. Goncharov
- Evgeniy Nemchenko as Sr. Lt. Solovyov
- Evgeniy Grigorev
- Fyodor Ivanov as Pilot (uncredited)

== Production ==
The aircraft used in Nebo Moskvy are:

- Polikarpov I-153
- Polikarpov I-16
- Mikoyan-Gurevich MiG-3
- Tupolev TB-3
- Junkers Ju 88 (scale model)
- Heinkel He 111 (scale models and static mockup) (Note: Nebo Moskvy was a "state-sponsored export" from the Soviet Union.)

== Reception ==
Under the title, The Moscow Sky and Moscow Skies, Nebo Moskvy was released worldwide (with English subtitles). Aviation film historian James H, Farmer in Celluloid Wings: The Impact of Movies on Aviation (1984) described the film's "primitive scenario enhanced by vivid scenes of wartime Russia." Aviation film historian Stephen Pendo in Aviation in the Cinema (1985) had a similar opinion, noting, "... the film mixed a tepid plot about a daring Army <sic> pilot who has an affair with an Army nurse with newsreel footage of aerial combat."
