= Natalya Gvozdikova =

Soviet and Russian actress

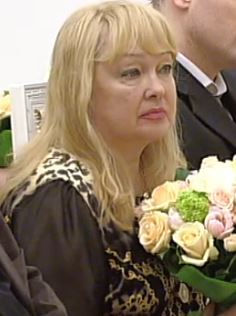
- Born: Natalya Fedorovna Gvozdikova; 7 January 1948 (age 78); Borzya, Chita Oblast, USSR
- Occupation: actress
- Years active: 1970–present
- Awards: Honored Artist of the RSFSR; People's Artist of Russia; USSR State Prize; Medal of Pushkin

Natalya Fedorovna Gvozdikova (Russian: Наталья Фёдоровна Гвоздикова; born 7 January 1948) is a Soviet and Russian film and theatre actress.

== Early life and education ==
Natalia Gvozdikova was born on 7 January 1948 in the Borzya Chita Oblast. Her father was soldier Feodor Titovich Gvozdikov (1911) and mother was Nina Gvozdikova (1921-2005).

== Career ==
Gvozdikova specialized as a theater and film actress (1967-1971, acting course of Sergei Gerasimov and Tamara Makarova). Between 1971–1993 she worked as an actress at the State Theater of the Film Actor.

=== Selected filmography ===
- By the Lake (1969) as girl
- City of First Love (1970)
- Oh, That Nastya! (1971)
- Big School-Break (1973) as Polina
- The Red Snowball Tree (1974) as telegraph operator
- Born by the Revolution (Rozhdyonnaya revolyutsiey; 1974–77) as Mariya Kondratyeva
- Mistress into Maid (1995) as neighbor

== Awards ==
- USSR State Prize (1978)
- Honored Artist of RSFSR (1983)
- Medal of Pushkin
- People's Artist of Russia (2013)

== Personal life ==
Gvozdikova's husband was actor Evgeny Zharikov (1941-2012), a People's Artist of the USSR. Gvozdikova's son is Fedor Zharikov. On the set of the TV series Born by the Revolution she dated her on-screen spouse, actor Evgeny Zharikov, and they got married. Zharikov died on 18 January 2012 in Moscow, at the Botkin hospital from cancer.
