= Oh, That Nastya! =

- Russian: Ох уж эта Настя!
- Directed by: Yuri Pobedonostsev
- Written by: Valentina Spirina
- Produced by: Tagi Aliyev; Yakov Zvonkov
- Starring: Irina Volkova; Sergei Kuskov; Natalya Gvozdikova; Aleksandr Kharitonov; Svetlana Kotikova; Nina Arkhipova
- Cinematography: Aurelius Jacinevicius; Boris Seredin
- Edited by: A. Klebanov
- Music by: Yevgeny Krylatov
- Production company: Gorky Film Studio
- Release date: 1971
- Running time: 77 min.
- Country: Soviet Union
- Language: Russian

Oh, That Nastya! (Russian: Ох уж эта Настя!, romanized: Okh, uzh eta Nastya!) is a 1971 Soviet family film directed by Yuri Pobedonostsev.

The film tells about the schoolgirl Nastya, who always invents outlandish stories, as a result of which she quarrels with a teacher, classmates and sister.

== Plot ==
Nastya Ryabinina loves to dream and imagine, but her homeroom teacher Maryana Borisovna, some classmates, and her older sister Sveta believe that she is lying and should stop telling her made-up stories as if they were real. Nastya tells her classmates about her friendship with a black panther, claims that her mother went to a beautiful city called Aeolis (which doesn't appear on any map), and describes her sister’s friend Sasha Zharikov as a pilot who was kidnapped and held captive by aliens.

In reality, Nastya's mother works at "Aeolis," which stands for Experimental Operations in Construction "Lisichka." She believes that her daughter isn’t lying but rather embellishing events with her imagination. Over time, even Maryana Borisovna starts to believe in Nastya’s sincerity, and the class pioneer leader convinces the other students to accept Nastya into the Pioneer organization. Nastya is formally welcomed into the Pioneers during a solemn moment of silence at a monument honoring fallen soldiers.

== Cast ==
- Irina Volkova as Nastya (Anastasia)
- Tatyana Nevskaya as Lyuba Sitnikova
- Sergei Kuskov as Edik Syroyegin
- Natalya Gvozdikova as Sveta Ryabinina
- Aleksandr Kharitonov as Sasha Zharikov
- Svetlana Kotikova as Maryana Borisovna
- Nina Arkhipova as Ryabinina
- Natalia Yegorova as Olya
- Sasha Avayev as Sasha Avayev
- Yelena Gabrielova as gymnastics coach
- Sergei Prokhanov as counselor
