= Moscow in October =

1927 film

- Film poster (1927)
- Russian: "Москва в Октябре"
- Directed by: Boris Barnet
- Written by: Oleg Leonidov
- Starring: Anna Sten; Boris Barnet; Ivan Bobrov; Aleksandr Gromov; Vasily Nikandrov
- Cinematography: Boris Frantsisson; Konstantin Kuznetsov; Yakov Tolchan
- Production company: Mezhrabpomfilm
- Release date: 7 November 1927
- Running time: 70 minutes
- Country: Soviet Union
- Language: Russian (intertitles)

Moscow in October (Russian: Москва в Октябре, romanized: Moskva v oktyabre) is a 1927 Soviet silent historical drama film directed by Boris Barnet. The picture fared poorly at the box-office and with the critics. The film has been partially lost.

== History ==
The film is timed to coincide with the 10th anniversary of the October Revolution and was withdrawn by order of the "October Jubilee Commission" under the Presidium of the Central Executive Committee of the USSR.

Particular attention was paid to the "party apparatus" Sergei Eisenstein, Vsevolod Pudovkin, Esfir Shub and Boris Barnet. But if Eisenstein's films - "Oktyabr", Pudovkina - "The End of St. Petersburg" and Shub - "The Great Way", became widely known, then Barnet's film was not very popular and was soon removed from the "big screen", made only a few copies of the film.

Despite a small rental in the USSR, special criticism from the press did not follow, as it was known - the script was agreed with ""Eastpart"" and was viewed not only by the commission responsible for the preparation of solemn events, but even at the next plenum of the Central Committee of the Soviet Union.

The film was not completely preserved: several parts were lost during the course of the Second World War.

== Synopsis ==
The painting depicts the staged scenes of the October Bolshevik uprising in Moscow, as well previous events. The film begins with a scene of a meeting: people near the monument to Alexander Sergeevich Pushkin, intertitles: "After the July days there were uninterrupted rallies," which indicates July 1917. The film covers events from this date, right up to the creation Council of People's Commissars, headed by Lenin.

== Cast ==
- Anna Sten
- Boris Barnet
- Ivan Bobrov
- Aleksandr Gromov
- Vasily Nikandrov as Lenin
