= Adventure in Odessa =

1953 film

- Directed by: Vasily Zhuravlyov
- Written by: Georgiy Grebner; A. Speshnev
- Production company: Kiev Film Studio
- Release date: 25 March 1953
- Running time: 78 minutes
- Country: Soviet Union
- Language: Russian

Adventure in Odessa or Inseparable Friends (Russian: Неразлучные друзья, romanized: Nerazluchnye druzya) is a 1953 Soviet comedy drama film directed by Vasily Zhuravlyov and starring Mikhail Kuznetsov, Evgeniy Samoylov and Viktor Dobrovolsky.

== Plot ==
A group of inseparable school friends from Odessa—Gleb, Kolya, and Vadim—discover a sunken sailing ship named Otvazhny ("Brave") and decide to raise it on their own. Gleb designs a lifting mechanism, but their geography teacher, Belov, suggests involving a larger team. The friends, however, insist on working independently, which leads to failure.

The idea of raising the ship captures the imagination of other students, who succeed in lifting the Otvazhny by pooling their efforts. Adults, including workers from a ship repair plant, also lend their support. The proud trio refuses to participate and instead plans to run away to a construction site. Their parents and teacher Belov intervene, convincing them to join the collective effort.

During a storm, Gleb saves the ship and is appointed its captain. The students embark on a journey across the Black Sea aboard the restored Otvazhny, uncovering its history along the way. The film concludes with their return to Odessa, marking the end of their adventure.

== Cast ==
- Mikhail Kuznetsov as Professor Belov
- Evgeniy Samoylov as Gleb's Father
- Viktor Dobrovolsky as School Director
- Aleksandr Antonov as Chairman of the Collective Farm
- Ivan Pelttser as Old Fisherman
- Grigori Pluzhnik as Captain of the fishing ship
- Misha Mokrinsky as Gleb
- Volodya Lushchik as Vadim
- Volodya Sudin as Kolya
- Anatoli Shimanyuk as Vasya
- Natasha Morel as Nina
- Yuri Kritenko as Boatswain

== Bibliography ==
- Rollberg, Peter. Historical Dictionary of Russian and Soviet Cinema. Scarecrow Press, 2008.
