= The Thaw (1931 film) =

1931 film

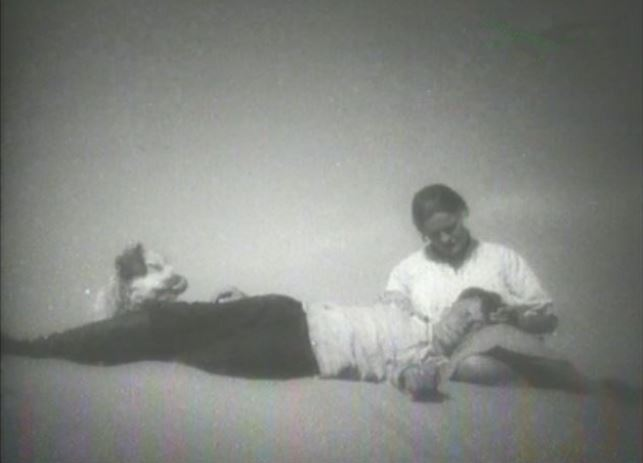
- Russian: Ледолом
- Directed by: Boris Barnet
- Written by: K. Grobunov (novel); O. Meleg; S. Yevlakhov
- Starring: Vera Marinich; Aleksandr Zhukov; Anton Martynov; Sergei Pryanishnikov
- Cinematography: Mstislav Kotelnikov
- Release date: 1931
- Country: Soviet Union

The Thaw (Russian: Ледолом) is a 1931 Soviet silent film directed by Boris Barnet.

== Plot ==
Kulak's son attracts the attention of Anka, the daughter of a poor man. She falls in love with him, Anka becomes pregnant, but the young man throws her. Her life changes when Komsomol Semyon returns home from service in the army.

== Cast ==
- Vera Marinich as Anka
- Aleksandr Zhukov as Skulov
- Anton Martynov as Semen
- Sergei Pryanishnikov as Tarkhanov
