= The Gray Wolves =

- Russian: Серые волки
- Directed by: Igor Gostev
- Written by: Igor Gostev; Sergei Khrushchev; Aleksandr Lapshin; Valentin Olekhnovich; Vladimir Valutsky
- Produced by: Gennady Morozov
- Starring: Rolan Bykov; Aleksandr Belyavsky; Lev Durov; Bogdan Stupka; Aleksandr Mokhov
- Cinematography: Vladimir Fridkin
- Edited by: Tamara Zubova
- Music by: Andrei Petrov
- Production company: Mosfilm
- Release date: 1993
- Running time: 108 min.
- Country: Russia
- Language: Russian

The Gray Wolves (Russian: Серые волки, romanized: Serye volki) is a 1993 Russian political film, directed by Igor Gostev.

== Plot ==
The plot centers on the ouster of Nikita Khrushchev, following a man who attempts to uncover a plot against him.

== Cast ==
- Rolan Bykov as Nikita Khrushchev
- Aleksandr Belyavsky as Leonid Brezhnev
- Lev Durov as Anastas Mikoyan
- Bogdan Stupka as Semichastny
- Aleksandr Mokhov as Sorokin
- Aleksandra Zakharova as Marina
- Aleksandr Potapov as Sergei Khrushchev
- Gennady Sayfulin as Malkov
- Vladimir Troshin as Podgorny
- Yevgeny Zharikov as Shelepin
- Viktor Sergachyov as Suslov
- Pyotr Velyaminov as Nikolai Ignatov
