= Blue Roads =

- Russian: Голубые дороги
- Directed by: Vladimir Braun
- Written by: Grigoriy Koltunov
- Starring: Pavel Kadochnikov; Marina Kalinkyna; Viktor Dobrovolsky; Sergey Stolyarov; Yuri Lyubimov
- Cinematography: Ivan Shekker
- Music by: Vadim Gomolyaka; Yakov Tseglyar
- Release date: 1947
- Country: Soviet Union
- Language: Russian

Blue Roads, (Russian: Голубые дороги) is a 1947 Soviet war adventure drama film directed by Vladimir Braun.

== Plot ==
Despite the fact that the Great Patriotic War has come to an end, in the depths of the sea there are still German mines. One of them is found in the Odessa port and Captain Ratanov begins to neutralize it. But suddenly it explodes, seriously wounding the captain. Will he be able to return to work?

== Cast ==
- Pavel Kadochnikov as Sergey Ratanov
- Marina Kalinkina as Nadezhda Ratanova
- Viktor Dobrovolsky as Sergey Konstantinovich
- Mikhail Romanov as Berezhenko
- Sergey Stolyarov as Razgovorov
- Yury Lyubimov as Yuri Vetkin
- Vladimir Osvetsimsky as Captain Konsovsky
- Arkadi Arkadyev as Kalachenko
- Andrei Sova as Sailor
