= Whistle Stop (1963 film) =

1963 Soviet Union film

- Russian poster
- Russian: Полустанок
- Directed by: Boris Barnet
- Written by: Boris Barnet; Nikolay Pogodin
- Starring: Vasiliy Merkurev; Yekaterina Mazurova; Nadezhda Rumyantseva; Boris Novikov; A. Berezovskaya
- Cinematography: Sergei Poluyanov
- Music by: Kirill Molchanov
- Production company: Mosfilm
- Release date: 1963
- Running time: 71 minutes
- Country: Soviet Union
- Language: Russian

Whistle Stop (Russian: Полустанок) is a 1963 Soviet comedy film directed by Boris Barnet.

The film tells about the academician, who is going for a vacation in the village, but there it is not as calm as he expected it to be.

== Plot ==
Academician Pavel Pavlovich, a prominent scientist, takes a vacation to escape the daily hustle of Moscow. Following medical advice, he opts for a simple Russian village instead of resorts or health spas. Hoping to breathe fresh air, relax, and indulge in his favorite hobby of painting, he settles into a dilapidated barn traditionally used by visiting artists.

However, his expectations of peace and quiet are quickly dashed. The seemingly remote village is brimming with lively, engaging residents and a constant flurry of events—some humorous, others serious. While the people are kind and the incidents are of local significance, one thing is certain: tranquility is nowhere to be found.

== Cast ==
- Vasiliy Merkurev as Pavel Pavlovich (as V. Merkuryev)
- Yekaterina Mazurova as Grandmother Tatyana (as Ye. Mazurova)
- Nadezhda Rumyantseva as Sima - Kolkhoz accountant (as N. Rumyantseva)
- Boris Novikov as Kolkhoz foreman (as B. Novikov)
- A. Berezovskaya as Klavka - milkmaid
- Elizaveta Nikishchikhina as Zoika - shopgirl (as Ye. Nikishchikhina)
- Aleksandr Potapov as Ivan - tractor driver (as A. Potapov)
- Valeri Ryzhakov as Vasya - driver (as V. Ryzhakov)
