= House with Lilies =

- Written by: Maria Beck; Elena Boyko
- Directed by: Vladimir Krasnopolsky; Valery Uskov
- Starring: Sergey Makhovikov; Darya Moroz; Olesya Sudzilovskaya
- Music by: Yevgeny Shiryaev
- Country of origin: Russia; Ukraine
- Original language: Russian

Production
- Producers: Anatoly Chizhikov; Natalia Chizhikova; Sergey Kulikov; Victor Mirsky
- Cinematography: Timur Zelma
- Production companies: Favorite Film; Film.UA

Original release
- Network: Channel One Russia; Inter
- Release: 2013 – 2013

House with Lilies (Russian: Дом с ли́лиями, romanized: Dom s liliami) is a Russian-Ukrainian melodramatic TV series directed by Vladimir Krasnopolsky and Valery Uskov. The authors describe their series as a family saga. The premiere took place in Ukraine on TV channel Inter March 31, 2014. In Russia the premiere was held on Channel One.

== Plot ==
After the end of World War II, war hero Mikhail Govorovov becomes a Regional Party Leader in the Communist Party and moves with his whole family to a country house. At first, Michail does not believe the legends of a curse on the house: neither its owners nor their children and grandchildren will be happy in love.

== Cast ==
- Sergey Makhovikov as Mikhail Ivanovich Govorov
- Darya Moroz as Taisiya, Lilya's mother
- Olesya Sudzilovskaya as Margarita, Govorov's wife
- Nikolai Dobrynin as Dementy Kharitonovich Shulgin
- Anna Gorshkova as Govorov's daughter
- Denis Matrosov as Rodion Kamyshev, Lilya's husband
- Alexey Fateev as Sergey Morozov
- Yevgeny Knyazev as actor Arefiev
- Elena Radevich as Lilya in 16–18 years
- Mikhail Zhigalov as Egorych
- Viktor Rakov as Miron Polischuk, MGB officer
- Boris Khimichev as Rostopchin
- Sergey Batalov as Gavrila Petrovich
- Oksana Shvets as Director of Orphanage
- Georgy Drozd as Karp Semyonovich Luzhnikov

== Awards and nominations ==
TeleTriumph (2015)

- Best Writer (Writer's crew) of the TV movie/series: Maria Bek, Elena Boiko — won

APKIT Awards (2015)

- Best Television Mini-Series (5–24 episodes) — nom

== History of creation ==
Principal photography took place in Kyiv in the summer and autumn of 2013. Some scenes were filmed in London.

Director Vladimir Krasnopolsky about the series: "The action of the film covers almost 60 years. The events unfold in the difficult post-war period. According to the plot, it turned out not to be a love triangle, but a real square. The main character returns from the war to his wife and children, and at this time there is his illegitimate child from a front-line girlfriend, and the woman herself appears in their house as a housewife. The atmosphere is heated to the limit. The actors have a place to turn around."
