= Petrovka, 38 =

- Russian: Петровка, 38
- Directed by: Boris Grigoryev
- Written by: Yulian Semyonov
- Starring: Georgi Yumatov; Vasily Lanovoy; Yevgeni Gerasimov; Lyudmila Nilskaya; Mikhail Zhigalov
- Cinematography: Igor Klebanov
- Edited by: Nina Vasilyeva
- Music by: Georgiy Dmitriev
- Release date: 1980
- Running time: 88 minute
- Country: Soviet Union
- Language: Russian

Petrovka, 38 (Russian: Петровка, 38) is a 1980 Soviet crime film directed by Boris Grigoryev.

The film tells about the employees of the Moscow Criminal Investigation who are investigating the robberies committed by a group of criminals with dark glasses.

== Plot ==
In May 1979, Moscow Criminal Investigation Department officers—Colonel Alexei Pavlovich Sadchikov, Major Vladislav Nikolaevich Kostenko, and Senior Lieutenant Valentin Roslyakov—investigate a series of daring robberies carried out by a gang of criminals wearing dark sunglasses.

With the help of a teenager, Lyonka, who accidentally became acquainted with the gang and was drawn into a failed robbery attempt on a savings bank, the police manage to arrest two gang members known as "Chita" and "Sudar." Forensic experts identify the fingerprints on a pistol as belonging to one of the robbers, and the detained suspects let slip information about "Prokhor," the gang leader.

The investigation leads the detectives to a quiet village near Moscow, where they discover that an unassuming old man is, in fact, Prokhor, the gang's leader. In a shootout, Prokhor critically wounds Roslyakov, but doctors manage to save him. Major Kostenko then apprehends the fleeing Prokhor and presents him with the irrefutable evidence collected in the investigation.

== Cast ==
- Georgi Yumatov as Aleksey Pavlovich Sadchikov
- Vasily Lanovoy as Vyacheslav Nikolayevich Kostenko
- Yevgeni Gerasimov as Valya Poslyakov
- Lyudmila Nilskaya as Alyena
- Mikhail Zhigalov
- Aleksandr Nikiforov as Chita
- Nikolai Eryomenko
- Grigoriy Lyampe
- Aleksandr Egorov as Lyonka Samsonov (as Sasha Yegorov)
- Yuri Volkov as Aleksey Alekseyevich Samsonov
