= Nikolay Bogolyubov (actor) =

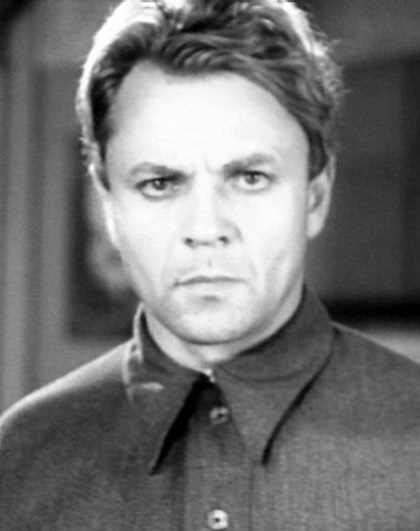
Nikolay Bogolyubov as Shakhov in The Great Citizen (1937—1939)

Nikolay Ivanovich Bogolyubov (Russian: Никола́й Ива́нович Боголю́бов; 22 October 1899 – 9 March 1980) was a Soviet actor born in Ivanovskoye, Russian Empire and a People's Artist of the RSFSR (1945). In 1933 he played in Boris Barnet's Okraina; in 1941, he was awarded the Stalin Prize.

Bogolyubov attended the studio school of the Ryazan town theater and joined its troupe in 1919. In 1923–1926, he studied at the school of the Theater of the Russian Federation (RSFSR), named after its director Vsevolod Meyerhold. From 1938 to 1958, the actor belonged to the Moscow Art Theater.

Bogolyubov made his film debut in 1931 in Yakov Protazanov’s first sound picture Tommy (1931). He also appeared in Boris Barnet’s Outskirts (1933) as the Bolshevik Nikolai who is executed for initiating fraternization with the German enemy at the end of World War I.

Bogolyubov played the role of a dogmatic functionary in Fridrikh Ermler’s Peasants (1935), where he was cast as Nikolai Mironovich, head of the Political Department, who gives his all to transform the “backward farmer’s psychology.” In 1937–1939, Ermler cast Bogolyubov with the role of Party leader Petr Shakhov in The Great Citizen, for which the actor received a Stalin Prize in 1941. He worked with leading Soviet directors, including Sergei Gerasimov (Seven Brave Men, 1936), the Vasilyev brothers (The Defense of Tsaritsyn, 1942, Stalin Prize), and Mikheil Chiaureli (The Vow, 1944; The Fall of Berlin, 1949). Because of his likeness to Marshall Kliment Voroshilov (1881–1969), he became his screen double, for example, in Igor Savchenko’s The Third Blow (1948).

Bogolyubov, who joined the Communist Party in 1950.

== Partial filmography ==
- Tommy (1931) as partisan
- Outskirts (1933) as Nikolai Kadkin
- Seven Brave Men (1936) as Capt. Ilya Letnikov
- The Great Citizen (1938) as Shakhov, the great citizen – Stalin Prize second degree (1941)
- The Oppenheim Family (1939) as Herman Weller
- Lenin in 1918 (1939) as Voroshilov (scenes deleted)
- The Golden Key (1939) as Captain of the airship
- The Defense of Tsaritsyn. 1 episode: Voroshilov's Campaign (1942) as Kliment Voroshilov – Stalin Prize first degree (1942)
- Aleksandr Parkhomenko (1942) as Voroshilov
- Lad from Our Town (1942) as Dr. Burmin
- The Defense of Tsaritsyn. 2nd episode: Defense (1942) as Kliment Voroshilov
- Nebo Moskvy (1944) as Lt. Col. Balashev
- The Vow (1946) as Aleksandr, her eldest son
- Boy from the Outskirts (1948) as Stepan Shubin, factory director
- The Third Blow (1948) as Voroshilov
- The Fall of Berlin (1950) as Factory Superintendent Kumchinsky
- Zhukovsky (1950) as Captain Aleksandr Mozhaysky (uncredited)
- Generali da zizilebi (1963) as Field Marshal
- Liberation III: Direction of the Main Blow (1970) as Kliment Voroshilov (final film role)

== Awards ==
- Stalin Prize first degree (1942, 1946, 1947, 1949, 1950)
- Stalin Prize second degree (1941)

== See also ==
- Vsevolod Meyerhold State Theatre
