= Footprint in the Ocean =

- Russian: След в океане
- Directed by: Oleg Nikolayevsky
- Written by: Kirill Rapoport; Boris Vasilyev
- Starring: Ada Sheremetyeva; Yuri Dedovich; Yevgeny Vesnik; Daniil Netrebin; Pavel Makhotin; Igor Sretensky; Gennadi Nilov; Viktor Uralsky
- Cinematography: Ivan Artyukhov
- Edited by: Lyudmila Chuzo
- Release date: 1964
- Country: Soviet Union
- Language: Russian

Footprint in the Ocean (Russian: След в океане) is a 1964 Soviet adventure film directed by Oleg Nikolayevsky produced by Sverdlovsk Film Studio.

A Soviet scientist develops new scuba gear, which is tested by the best divers in a warship of the Northern Fleet. Western intelligence agencies, in turn, are interested in the unique possibilities of the invention and the scientist’s diaries. And to get them they send a spy in Moscow.

== Plot ==
In Soviet territorial waters near a secluded bay on an island (filmed in Crimea), a team conducts experimental trials of a groundbreaking gas mixture for underwater breathing apparatuses. This innovative mixture is designed to allow divers to safely reach extreme depths of hundreds of meters. The trials involve the inventor of the gas, Sretensky, alongside Dr. Kushlya, Captain Second Rank Igor Belogurov, and elite divers from across the Soviet Navy. However, the secretive nature of the project attracts the attention of foreign intelligence, setting off a chain of espionage attempts to infiltrate the operation.

The Soviet counterintelligence agency sends Senior Lieutenant of State Security Lyudmila Skuratova, disguised as a graduate student named Balashova, to the base where the trials are being conducted. Her mission is to uncover and neutralize enemy agents. She identifies one such operative, a scuba diver working from a foreign schooner stationed in neutral waters. Another agent, the navigator Yeltsov, quickly realizes her identity when he notices discrepancies with the real Balashova’s photograph. In a tense encounter, Yeltsov attempts to eliminate Skuratova, but she outmaneuvers him while gaining the trust of the scuba diver, who believes she is the genuine Balashova. Using this trust, she learns that the diver plans to smuggle Sretensky and critical data onto the schooner.

Skuratova thwarts the espionage operation with decisive action. She intercepts the diver’s radio transmission to a lighthouse keeper, using it to communicate the schooner’s coordinates to a Soviet border patrol ship. When the diver attempts to kill a crew member, Petty Officer Viktor Kondratyev, she intervenes and saves him multiple times. Meanwhile, Kondratyev apprehends Yeltsov after a violent struggle. Skuratova’s swift thinking leads to the capture of the schooner and the neutralization of all enemy agents. Returning to Moscow, she reports the successful completion of her mission. The film closes with a close-up of Skuratova's face, capturing the emotional weight of her ordeal and the resilience required for such a dangerous mission.

== Cast ==
- Ada Sheremetyeva
- Yuri Dedovich
- Yevgeny Vesnik
- Daniil Netrebin
- Pavel Makhotin
- Igor Sretensky
- Gennadi Nilov
- Viktor Uralsky
