= The Third Blow =

1948 film by Igor Savchenko

- Directed by: Igor Savchenko
- Written by: Arkadi Perventsev
- Produced by: Naum Veintrob
- Starring: Aleksei Dikiy; Nikolay Bogolyubov; Ivan Pereverzev; Mark Bernes; Sergey Martinson
- Cinematography: Mikhai Kirilov
- Edited by: the brothers Nikitchenko
- Music by: Natan Rakhlin (conductor) originally composed by Pyotr Tchaikovsky
- Production company: Kiev Film Studios
- Release date: 26 April 1948
- Running time: 106 minutes
- Country: Soviet Union
- Language: Russian

The Third Blow (Russian: Третий удар, romanized: Tretiy udar) is a Soviet 1948 war film directed by Igor Savchenko.

== Plot ==
In April 1944, Joseph Stalin orders the Red Army to liberate the Crimea from the German occupiers. The Wehrmacht's local commanders beg Hitler to allow them to retreat from the vulnerable position, but he refuses. After a fierce battle, the Soviet forces destroy the German and Romanian units defending the peninsula and retake Sevastopol.

== Production ==
The film's title was derived from the third of Stalin's ten blows, the Crimean Offensive of spring 1944, which served as the setting for the story.

The Third Blow was the first of the 'Artistic Documentaries', a series of large-scale Soviet screen productions which were meant to present the official interpretation of the USSR's history, especially the history of the Second World War. As all the artistic documentaries concerned with the war, The Third Blow consisted mainly of battle scenes, strewn with staff meetings of the Red Army's generals and Stalin. In addition, there were short episodes portraying the common soldiers and ordinary people participating in the events.

The film, in compliance with Stalin's cult of personality, presented the Soviet leader in a highly favorable manner, centering on his role as the supreme commander. Aleksei Dikiy, who performed his role, was reportedly Stalin's favorite for depicting himself.

== Reception ==
The film won the 1948 Gottwaldov Workers' Film Festival Award and a 2nd degree Stalin Prize at 1949. Arkadi Perventsev received the Award for Best Writing in the 1948 Karlovy Vary Film Festival for his work on the script.

French film critic André Bazin described the film as Stalinistic propaganda, writing that in The Third Blow: "Stalin mediates alone for a long time and.... He alone decides what measures would be taken... Vasilevsky is still there, but acts solely as a confidant, doubtless to save Stalin from appearing ridiculous by talking to himself."

In the Nikita Khrushchev years, after the de-Stalinization, many of the scenes involving Stalin were edited out of the film and it was re-released at 1965 under the title Southern Knot (Южный узел).

== Selected cast ==
- Aleksei Dikiy as Joseph Stalin
- Nikolay Bogolyubov as Kliment Voroshilov
- Ivan Pereverzev as General Yakov Kreizer
- Mark Bernes as Sailor Chmega
- Sergey Martinson as Adolf Hitler
- Mikhail Astangov as General Erwin Jaenecke
