= Oksana Shvets =

Ukrainian actress (1955–2022)

- Оксана Швець
- Born: Oksana Oleksandrivna Shvets; 10 February 1955; Kiev, Ukrainian SSR, Soviet Union (now Kyiv, Ukraine)
- Died: 17 March 2022 (aged 67); Kyiv, Ukraine
- Education: I. K. Karpenko-Kary Theatre
- Occupation: Actress
- Organizations: Kyiv National Academic Molodyy Theatre
- Title: Merited Artist of Ukraine

Oksana Oleksandrivna Shvets (Ukrainian: Оксана Олександрівна Швець; 10 February 1955 – 17 March 2022) was a Ukrainian actress. She worked for the Kyiv National Academic Molodyy Theatre from its foundation in 1980 until her death, and was awarded the title Merited Artist of Ukraine, one of the highest Ukrainian honours for performing artists, in 1996. She also appeared on stage at the Ternopil Music and Drama Theatre and the Kyiv Theatre of Satire. She played in film and on television, such as in the 2013 Russian-Ukrainian series House with Lilies.

== Biography ==
Born in Kyiv, Shvets was a graduate of the theatre studio at the Ivan Franko Theatre in 1975 and of the faculty of theatre studies of the I. K. Karpenko-Kary Theatre in 1986. Shvets worked at the Ternopil Music and Drama Theatre, and the Kyiv Theatre of Satire. She worked as an ensemble member of the Kyiv National Academic Molodyy Theatre (Young Theatre) from its foundation in 1980 until her death. The company lists many of her roles and plays. She played in the 2013 production of Гоголь-могол (Gogol Mogol) by Nikolai Erdman.

She appeared as Natasha in Anton Chekhov's Three Sisters, directed by O. Uteganov. She performed as Hannah in a 2015 production of Зачарований (Charmed or Enchanted), based on the play Talentless by Ivan Karpenko-Kary. It was directed by Andriy Bilous, the theatre's intendant. Theatre critic Oleg Vergelis praised her performance, finding complexities in the mother-in-law's character, not just bad temper. In a 2016 production of Поступися місцем! (Make Way!) by Viña Delmar, she played the role of Nemi. The play, filmed as Make Way for Tomorrow, and described as a sad comedy, was directed by Dmytro Veselsky. (Note: Make Way! is possibly the production mentioned in some sources as Get Missed!)

In 1996, her long-time engagement and "outstanding achievement in the performing arts" was honoured with the title Merited Artist of Ukraine, one of the highest Ukrainian awards for performing artists.

While best known for her work on the stage, she acted in several films and television series. She appeared in the film Завтра буде завтра (Tomorrow Will Be Tomorrow). Her first television series was Nasledniki (Heirs) in 1976, playing a minor role. In 2003, she appeared in an episode of Повернення Мухтара (Mukhtar Returns), an action-adventure series in Russian running for almost 20 years. She starred in all eight episodes of the Ukrainian series Таємниця Святого Патріка (The Mystery of Saint Patrick) in 2006. In 2013, she appeared in Russian-Ukrainian Дім з ліліями (House with Lilies), a TV series about fictional war hero Michail Govorov and his family from World War II to 2013, as the director of an orphanage.

== Death ==
On 17 March 2022, during the Russian invasion of Ukraine, Shvets died in Russian troops' shelling on a Kyiv residential building where she lived.

== See also ==
- List of productions at the Kyiv National Academic Molodyy Theatre (in Ukrainian)
