= TASS Is Authorized to Declare... =

1984 Soviet TV spy miniseries

- Written by: Yulian Semyonov
- Directed by: Vladimir Fokin
- Theme music composer: Eduard Artemyev
- Country of origin: Soviet Union
- Original language: Russian
- No. of episodes: 10

Production
- Producer: Pyotr Pashkevich
- Cinematography: Igor Klebanov
- Editor: Yelena Zabolotskaya
- Running time: 700 minutes
- Production company: Gorky Film Studio

Original release
- Release: 30 July – 10 August 1984

TASS Is Authorized to Declare... (Russian: ТАСС уполномочен заявить..., translit. TASS upolnomochen zayavit...) is a 1984 Soviet spy miniseries directed by Vladimir Fokin. The series is set in the Cold War era and portrays a struggle between Soviet and American intelligence agencies. It is based on a novel by the same name by Yulian Semyonov (the author of cult spy series Seventeen Moments of Spring). Seventeen Moments star Vyacheslav Tikhonov played KGB General Konstantinov, the protagonist of the "TASS..." series.

Original film music score was composed by Eduard Artemyev as a blend of progressive rock and electronic music.

== Plot ==
Trianon (Boris Klyuyev), a willing mole agent for the Americans, is providing his CIA handlers in Moscow with information on Soviet supplies to the fictional African state of Nagonia which he obtains through his high-positioned expert job. KGB counterintelligence painstakingly identifies him. Trianon kills his fiancee who raised suspicions on his double life and commits suicide when arrested. KGB uses body double in order to secure apprehension of Trianon's CIA handlers.

At the same time in Nagonia, Soviet counterintelligence agent Slavin (Yuri Solomin) risks his life assisting in identifyingTrianon and preventing local CIA resident Glabb (Vakhtang Kikabidze) from staging a coup d'etat in the country by pro-American General Ogano against ruling progressive president Grisso. Several foreign whistleblowers providing Slavin with information are killed by Glabb's order.

As the result of successful KGB operation, the TASS state news agency issues a sensational news bulletin exposing the CIA plot.

== Cast ==
- Vyacheslav Tikhonov as KGB General Konstantinov
- Yury Solomin as Slavin
- Nikolai Zasukhin as Makarov
- Aleksei Petrenko as Paul Dick, journalist
- Ivars Kalnins as Minayev
- Nikolai Mikheyev as Pavel Savelyevich Ozersky
- Nikolai Skorobogatov as Arkhipkin
- Mikhail Gluzsky as Fyodorov
- Irina Alfyorova as Olga Winter
- Vladlen Davydov as Yeryomin
- Boris Khimichev as Michael Welsh
- Georgi Tejkh as Nelson Grin
- Mikhail Zhigalov as Paramonov
- Aristarkh Livanov as Welsh's assistant
- Vladimir Mashchenko as Shargin
- Zhanna Prokhorenko as Paramonova
- Vakhtang Kikabidze as John Glabb, CIA resident to Nagonia
- Eleonora Zubkova as Pilar, Glabb's mistress
- Bolot Bejshenaliyev as Lao
- Vladimir Belousov as Tsyzin
- Vatslav Dvorzhetsky as Professor Winter
- Konstantin Karelskikh as Luns
- Aleksandr Karin as KGB officer
- Vadim Andreev as Dronov, KGB lieutenant
- Boris Klyuyev as Sergey Dubov (Agent 'Trianon')
- Erwin Knausmüller as U.S. Ambassador
- Kalifa Konde as Ogano
- Ermengeld Konovalov as Stau
- Leonid Kuravlyov as Zotov
- Marina Levtova as Olga Vronskaya
- Pavel Makhotin as Yarantsev
- Heino Mandri as Lorence, former CIA resident to Nagonia, killed by Glabb
- Mikk Mikiver as Donald Gee, journalist
- Aleksandr Pashutin as Gmyrya
- Tatyana Plotnikova as Niyazmetova
- Viktor Shulgin as Vogulyov
- Eduard Martsevich as Dmitry Stepanov, a Soviet journalist
- Lyudmila Solodenko as Doctor
- Lembit Ulfsak as Schleyer
- Valentina Titova as Potapenko
- Olga Volkova as Emma Schanz, previous Glabb's wife
- Leonid Yarmolnik as Grechayev
- Georgi Yumatov as Ivan Belyu
- Boris Bystrov as Agafonov, a KGB major, the investigator
- Nadezhda Babkina as cameo
- Stunts by Oleg Fedulov

== See also ==
- Aleksandr Dmitrievich Ogorodnik
