= Mikhail Zhigalov =

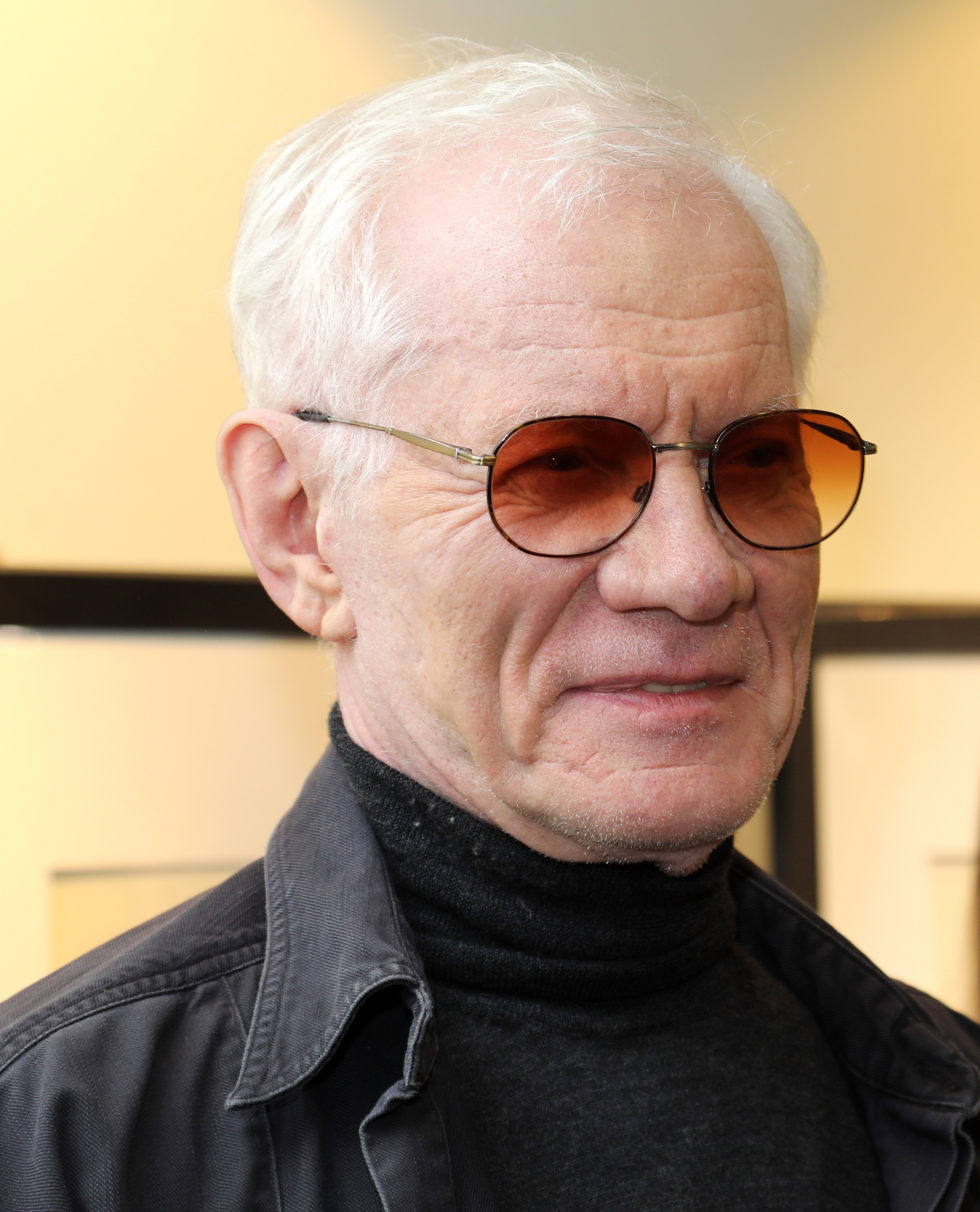
- Mikhail Zhigalov in 2017
- Born: Mikhail Vasilyevich Zhigalov; May 2, 1942 (age 84); Kuibyshev, RSFSR, USSR
- Occupation: Actor
- Years active: 1972–presents
- Spouse: Tatiana Zhigalova

Mikhail Vasilyevich Zhigalov (Russian: Михаил Васильeвич Жигалов; born May 2, 1942) is a Soviet and Russian actor of the Moscow Sovremennik Theatre and cinema. Honored Artist of the RSFSR (1991).

== Biography ==
Mikhail Zhigalov was born in Kuibyshev, Kuybyshevskaya oblast, Russian SFSR, Soviet Union (now Samara, Russia), which was evacuated mother of Mikhail during the Great Patriotic War. Father Mikhail Vasilyevich in 1938, worked in the KGB (the Young Communist League was called on set). After evacuation Zhigalova family returned to Moscow.

After the war, his father Michael was sent to work in Czechoslovakia. Three years later Zhigalova returned to Moscow, where Mikhail tried to go to college. The first attempt did not turn into success and he worked for a year at the plant, and was secretary of the Komsomol organization of workshops. The following year he was able to enter the Moscow Institute of Chemical Engineering. While studying at the institute married.

In 1965 he graduated from the Institute Zhigalov, the distribution was in SRI, the laboratory filtration theory. His career began to emerge successfully, but when the opportunity came in the 10 months to go to England, to return from there to the final thesis, Mikhail refused the opportunity and resigned. His career attracted the actor, and soon the young couple divorced.

In 1970 he graduated from Zhigalov drama studio at the Central Children's Theatre, where the actor worked until 1978, then went to the Sovremennik Theatre, where he created his major theatrical role.

The film was removed in 1972. He worked on more than a hundred movies.

== Selected filmography ==
- 1972 — The Last Day as Lieutenant
- 1975 — For the Rest of His Life as Lieutenant Commander without legs
- 1977 — On Thursday and Never Again as huntsman
- 1979 — Abduction Savoy as terrorist Magnus
- 1980 — Petrovka, 38
- 1984 — TASS Is Authorized to Declare... as auto mechanic Paramonov
- 1986 — To Award (Posthumously)
- 1990 — Vagrant Bus as Vasily
- 1990 — Stalin's Funeral as working
- 1990 — Afghan Breakdown as Colonel Leonid
- 1991 — Lost in Siberia as leader of bitches
- 2002 — Brigada as Criminal authority Luka
- 2013 / 15 — The Junior Team as Stepan Arkadevich Zharsky, coach
- 2013 — House with Lilies as Yegorych
- 2023 — Monsieur Constant of Alan Simon as Mischa Vodyanov
