= Boris Khimichev =

Ukrainian-born Russian actor

- Борис Химичев
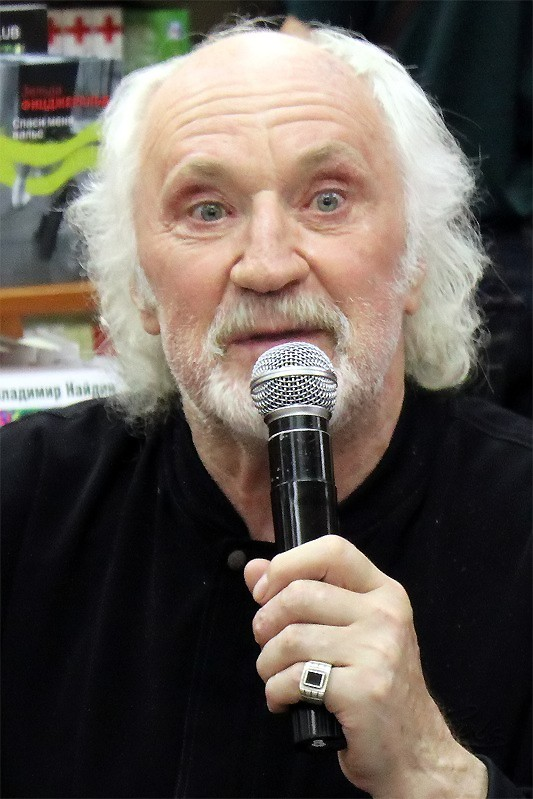
- Khimichev in 2009
- Born: 12 January 1933; Khmelnytskyi Oblast, Ukrainian SSR, Soviet Union
- Died: 14 September 2014 (aged 81); Moscow, Russia
- Occupation: Actor

Boris Petrovich Khimichev (Russian: Борис Петрович Химичев; 12 January 1933 – 14 September 2014) was a Ukrainian-born Russian actor who was named a People's Artist of Russia in 1993.

Khimichev worked at the Mayakovsky Theatre between 1964 and 1982. After his divorce from Tatyana Doronina, the theatre's leading actress, Khimichev joined the troupe of the Mossovet Theatre. He died at the age of 81 from a brain tumor.

== Selected filmography ==
- 1968: The Sixth of July as Telegrafist
- 1969: The Snow Maiden (Снегурочка) as Misghir
- 1974: The Silence of Dr. Evans (Молчание доктора Ивенса) as intelligence agent
- 1977: One-Two, Soldiers Were Going... (Аты-баты, шли солдаты... ) as Yuri Ivanovich
- 1978: Youth With Us (Молодость с нами) as Uralskiy
- 1980: Detective as Kolya Palyony
- 1981: True of Lieutenant Klimov as Admiral
- 1983: The Ballad of the Valiant Knight Ivanhoe (Баллада о доблестном рыцаре Айвенго) (TV Mini-Series) as Brian De Bois-Guilbert
- 1984: TASS Is Authorized to Declare... (ТАСС уполномочен заявить...) as Michael Welsh
- 1986: Boris Godunov (Борис Годунов) as Vasily Mosalsky
- 1988: Gardes-Marines, ahead! (Гардемарины, вперёд!) as Prince Cherkassky
- 1990: La batalla de los Tres Reyes as Zakhary Fluge
- 2013: Yeralash (Ералаш) (TV Series) as grandfather
- 2014: House with lily (Дом с ли́лиями) (TV Series) as Rostopchin
