= It Happened in the Donbas =

- Directed by: Leonid Lukov
- Written by: Sergei Antonov; Mikhail Bleiman
- Cinematography: Aleksandr Gintsburg
- Music by: Nikita Bogoslovsky
- Distributed by: Soyuzdetfilm
- Release date: 11 July 1945
- Running time: 102 minutes
- Country: Soviet Union
- Language: Russian

It Happened in the Donbas (Russian: Это было в Донбассе, romanized: Eto bylo v Donbasse) is a 1945 Soviet war drama film directed by Leonid Lukov based on a screenplay by Sergei Antonov and Mikhail Blajman. The film was produced by Soyuzdetfilm and released after the conclusion of the Second World War, on which it is based.

== Plot ==
The film is about the Soviet youth who fought in the Second World War (referred to in Russia as the Great Patriotic War) against the German invasion in the occupied Donbas region.

== Cast ==
- Tatiana Okunevskaya as Natasha Loginova
- Yelena Tyapkina as Darya Timofeevna
- Vera Altayskaya as Marusya Shelkoplyas
- Yelena Izmailova as Lisa
- Ivan Pelttser as Afanasy Petrovich Kulygin, miner
- Ivan Pereverzev as Stepan Andreyevich Ryabinin
- Mariya Yarotskaya as old woman
- Vladimir Balashov as Pavlik Bazanov
- Sergei Komarov
- Aleksei Konsovsky
- Alexander Mikhailov as member of the YCL
- Boris Poslavsky as Nikolay Sergeyevich Loginov, a doctor
- Heinrich Greif as official labor exchange and the Gestapo
- Vyacheslav Dugin as Anton
- Inna Makarova as partisan
- Yevgeny Morgunov as underground worker
- Mikhail Kuznetsov as underground worker
