= Evgeny Zharikov =

Soviet-Russian film actor (1941–2012)

- Евгений Жариков
- Zharikov in 1974
- Born: 26 February 1941; Moscow, Russian SFSR, Soviet Union
- Died: 18 January 2012 (aged 70); Moscow, Russia
- Occupation: Actor
- Years active: 1961–2012
- Spouses: Valentina Zotova (m. 1962; div. 1974); Natalya Gvozdikova c. (m. 1975)
- Partner(s): Tatyana Sekridova (affair, 1994–2001)
- Children: 3

Evgeny Ilyich Zharikov (Russian: Евгений Ильич Жариков; 26 February 1941 — 18 January 2012), also spelt Yevgeniy Ilich Zharikov and variants, was a Soviet and Russian film actor. He was awarded the USSR State Prize in 1978, and the title People's Artist of the RSFSR in 1989.

== Early life and education ==
Zharikov was born on 26 February 1941, in Moscow as the sixth and last child of the Soviet writer Leonid Zharikov (Ilya Milahievich Zharikov). He had a sister called Nina. He spent his childhood in the Moscow suburbs, near Zagorsk (now Sergiev Posad), with his grandparents, and from the age of four rode horses and mastered crafts.

In 1959, he entered the Gerasimov Institute of Cinematography and first appeared in a film in his second year of study.

== Career ==
In 1964, after graduation, he went to East Germany, where for two years he starred in the title role in the local series Russian for You. After his return in 1966, he acted in theater, television, and film in Moscow. He became a member of the CPSU in 1970.

He came to fame appearing in the 1970s television series Born by the Revolution about the formation of the Soviet militia and its fight against crime in the 1920s. In 1970, at the height of his career, he was injured on the set of the film Death No, Guys! when he fell from a horse at full gallop, which injured his hip and caused a compression fracture of the spine.

From 1988 to 2000, he was President of the Guild of Actors of Soviet Cinema (Russian Film Actors Guild from 1991), and founded the Sozvezdie International Film Festival, organised by the Guild and called "Constellation" in English.

He appeared in nearly 70 films and participated in the dubbing of more than 200 films. He was sometimes compared to French actor Alain Delon, on account of his perceived attractiveness to women.

== Awards ==
- USSR State Prize (1978)
- Honored Artist of RSFSR (1976)
- People's Artist of the RSFSR (1989)
- Order of Honour (1995)
- Order For Merit to the Fatherland 4th class (2001)
- Medal In Commemoration of the 850th Anniversary of Moscow

== Later life and death ==
In 1999 he underwent two complex operations with prosthetics.

He died on 18 January 2012 of rectal cancer at the oncology center at Botkin Hospital in Moscow. He was buried on January 21 in the actors' section in Troyekurovskoye Cemetery.

== Personal life ==
Zharikov's nickname was Zhenya.

His first marriage (1962–1974) was to figure skating coach Valentina Zotova, who was several years older than he was, but they only lived together for a year, and got divorced after 12 years. He had affairs with other women, and infected her with syphilis, which led to a hysterectomy.

He married actress Natalya Gvozdikova (who was married at the time) after they met on the set of the TV series Born by the Revolution (1974–1977). They had a son Fyodor (also spelt Fedor) Zharikov (born 2 August 1976), who studied languages. Fyodor worked for a few years at an aircraft manufacturer, for social services, and later was appointed to a leadership position in the information security service.

From 1994 to 2001, Zharikov had an affair with journalist Tatyana Sekridova (born 1960), who in 1995 gave birth to his son Sergei and daughter Katya. After Sekridova went public with their relationship (reportedly having discovered the existence of a third woman in his life), Zharikov ended it, and Gvozdikova forgave her husband. Zharikov ceased contact with the children of this affair.

== Selected filmography ==
- But What If This Is Love (А если это любовь, 1961) as Sergei
- Ivan's Childhood (Иваново детство, 1962) as Lt. Galtsev
- Three Plus Two (Три плюс два, 1962) as Vadim
- Sold by Air (Продавец воздуха, 1966) as Luke
- Snegurochka (Снегурочка, 1968) as Lel
- Signals — Adventures in Space (Сигналы — Приключения в космосе, Polish: Sygnały MMXX, German: Signale — Ein Weltraumabenteuer, 1970) as Pavel
- Life and Strange Surprising Adventures of Robinson Crusoe (Жизнь и удивительные приключения Робинзона Крузо, 1972) as ship captain
- Anvil or Hammer (Молот и наковальня, Bulgarian: Наковалня или чук, German: Amboss oder Hammer sein, 1972) as Igor
- Born by the Revolution (Рожденная революцией, 1974–1977) as Nikolay Fomich Kondratiev
- It Can't Be! (Не может быть!, 1975) as Nikolay
- Long Road in the Dunes (Долгая дорога в дюнах, Latvian: Ilgais ceļš kāpās, 1980–1981) as Otto Grünberg / Alexander Efimov
- Madame Wong Secrets (Тайны мадам Вонг, 1986) as ship captain
- Private Detective, or Operation Cooperation (Частный детектив, or Операция «Кооперация», 1989) as bootlegger
- The Gray Wolves (Серые волки, 1993) as Alexander Shelepin
- Midnight in Saint Petersburg (Полночь в Санкт-Петербурге, 1995) as Feodor Zavarzin
- The Aristocratic Peasant Girl (Барышня-крестьянка, 1995) as Roschin
- Bless the Woman (Благословите женщину, 2003) as passenger on the train
- I'm Staying (Я остаюсь, 2007) as Dr. Oleg Saprunov
