= Three Plus Two =

1962 film by Genrikh Oganessian

- Polish film poster
- Directed by: Genrikh Oganesyan
- Written by: Sergey Mikhalkov
- Starring: Natalya Kustinskaya; Natalya Fateyeva; Andrei Mironov; Evgeny Zharikov; Gennadi Nilov
- Cinematography: Vyacheslav Shumsky
- Edited by: Erika Meshkovskaya
- Music by: Andrei Volkonsky
- Production companies: Gorky Film Studio; Riga Film Studio
- Release date: July 3, 1963
- Running time: 100 minutes
- Country: Soviet Union
- Language: Russian

Three Plus Two, or 3 + 2 (Russian: Три плюс два, romanized: Try plyus dva) is a 1963 Soviet romantic comedy film directed by Genrikh Oganesyan based on a play by Sergei Mikhalkov, and co-produced by Moscow-based Gorky Film Studio and Soviet Latvian Riga Film Studio.

== Plot summary ==
The film is set in mid-1960s Crimea. Three male friends from Moscow—a veterinarian (Roman), diplomat (Vadim) and physicist (Stepan)—decide to go camping on the seashore. Once arriving at the coast of the Black Sea in their car, they select a deserted area to settle and set up their tents. Refusing all benefits of civilization, they enjoy bathing in the sea and preparing their own food from concentrates, until their privacy is invaded by two uninvited guests – a trainer and an actress (Zoya and Natasha) – who claim their rights to the young men's campsite. Deciding to make camp life as intolerable as possible for the three men, Zoya and Natasha set up camp in an attempt to purge the three friends from the seashore. Ultimately, the war for territory ends with a complete reconciliation of the two sides.

== Filmmaking details ==
The film was shot in both widescreen and fullscreen. For this reason each scene was shot twice.

=== Crimea location details ===
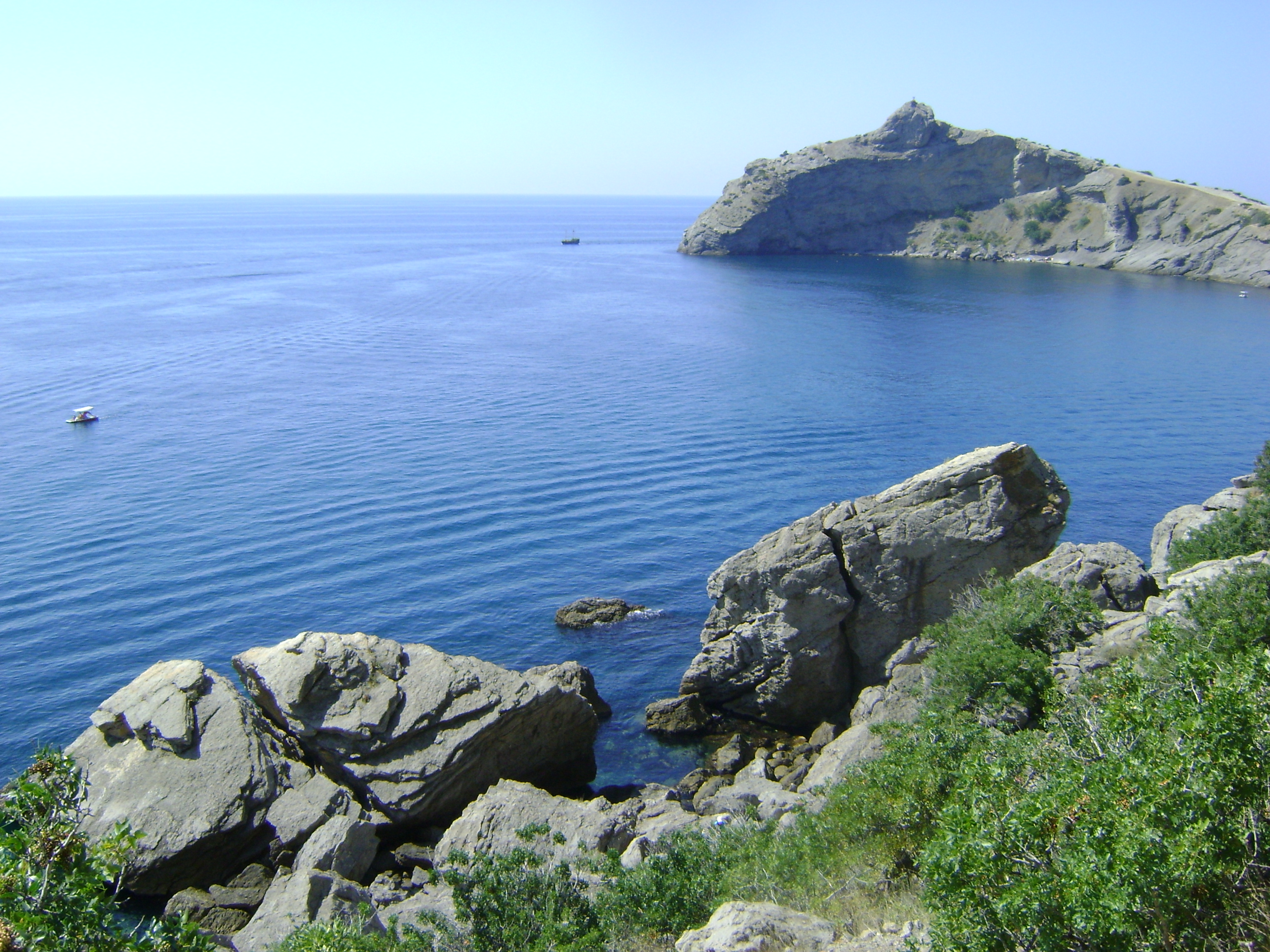
Blue Bay

The primary shooting location of the film was a village named Novy Svet in the Crimean Region of the Ukrainian SSR.

=== Other locations ===
The scenes in the tent and in the cabin of the Volga were shot at the Riga Film Studios. Screen tests prior to the film were also carried out there.

The section with the big cats was filmed in the Leningrad circus. Natalya Fateeva did enter the cage with the tigers bravely leaning on them and stroking them with her palm. Unfortunately these shots were not included in the film, because the tiger tamer, Walter Zapashny, fearing for the actress, kept the tiger by the leash all the time, and sadly his hands appeared in the frame.

“It's a pity that all my heroism was in vain. After all, I stroked the tiger, and leaned on it, once even slightly slapped it with my fist. Although I was in a state of mild shock: before filming, I was told that there would be a six-month-old tiger next to me, and already on the set I saw a huge animal."

The farm, where vet Roman (Mironov) tends the cows, was staged in Moscow.

=== The cars ===
03-45-лдд :- The lads’ car is a GAZ Volga, first generation, “Star” series. The car was built between 1959 and 1961.

18-15-лдг :- The girls' car was a ZAZ-965 “Zaporozhets”, produced in either 1960 or 61.

Both cars were registered in Leningrad, as denoted by the first two letters (in this case лд) on the plates.

=== The music ===
A recurring song played badly during the film by the boys on their guitar and at the end during the closing sequence is "Let them talk", sang by Aida Vedishcheva and Gennady Nilov. The arranger of the film's music was Raimonds Pauls.

== Cast ==
- Natalya Kustinskaya as Natasha, a film actress.
- Natalya Fateyeva as Zarema "Zoya" Pavlovna, circus performer, lion and tiger trainer.
- Andrei Mironov as Roman Lyubeshkin, veterinarian.
- Evgeny Zharikov as Vadim, an English speaking diplomat.
- Gennadi Nilov as Stepan Ivanovich Sundukov, Doctor of Physics and Mathematics.

Not credited

- Oganesyan appears in a cameo as the waiter of the "Chaika" (Seagull) restaurant.
- The remainder of the crew do appear in the title sequences of the longer, widescreen version of the film.
- Some film sites also reference further uncredited cast members such as those who appear in Stepan's flashback scenes of Son of Frankenstein (Basil Rathbone, Boris Karloff, Bela Lugosi, and Lionel Atwill).

== Language used ==
Whilst the majority of the film is in Russian, there are a few limited lines in English. Most of these are spoken by Vadim (the diplomat who presumably was stationed in England or the US). Interestingly, all of the lines are in the context of the film, they are reasonably well pronounced, which is enough to fob off the waiter in the restaurant. Amazingly, during a beach scene Zoya assertively responses back to one of the flirty one liners, albeit in Russian.

It is unknown if Evgeny Zharikov was able to speak English or if his lines were just learnt by rote.

== Popular culture ==
As the film was partially filmed in the famous champagne area of the Crimea and the crew were housed in the chateaux of Prince Golitsyn, it seems only fitting that in 2016, the ISSI wine group released a set of inexpensive red and white wines to celebrate the film . Each bottle is wrapped in paper recreating of a scene from the film using one of the two couples as an illustration.

There is also a “Three plus two” restaurant/guest house in the village where the film was shot. According to photos on their website you get a reasonable view of the headland of Hoba-Kaya across Novosvetovskaya Bay, which are both seen in the movie.

The large boulder in the water close to where Stepan placed his chair and fished is now named the "Sundukov stone" in his honour. In the scale of the whole of the dramatic Crimea coast this rock may be only a small feature. However it is one of the few, untouched and recognizable features left of the original beach and camp site.
