= Bountiful Summer =

- Directed by: Boris Barnet
- Written by: Nikolai Dalyokij; Evgeniy Pomeshchikov
- Starring: Nina Arkhipova; Nikolay Kryuchkov; Viktor Dobrovolsky
- Cinematography: Aleksei Mishurin
- Edited by: Nadezhda Ratmanskaya
- Music by: German Zhukovsky
- Production company: Kiev Film Studio
- Release date: 8 March 1951
- Running time: 87 minutes
- Country: Soviet Union
- Language: Russian

Bountiful Summer (Russian: Щедрое лето, romanized: Shchedroe leto) is a 1951 Soviet musical comedy drama film directed by Boris Barnet and starring Nina Arkhipova, Nikolay Kryuchkov and Viktor Dobrovolsky. The film is set on a collective farm in Ukraine.

It was shot at the Kiev Film Studio in 1950, but released the following year. It was also released in America the same year in a subtitled version by Artkino Pictures. The film was shot using a version of the sovcolor process.

== Plot ==
The film is set in the aftermath of World War II. Petr Sereda, a demobilized soldier, returns to his native collective farm, where he is warmly welcomed and soon takes on the role of chief accountant. At the same time, the community celebrates the arrival of Oksana Podpruzhenko, a celebrated labor heroine and Hero of Socialist Labor.

The farm is led by Nazar, Petr's old friend and wartime comrade, who serves as the kolkhoz chairman. The film follows the collective's efforts to achieve record-breaking agricultural results, showcasing the camaraderie and determination of its workers. Through a series of humorous and lighthearted episodes, it portrays the challenges of farm life, including economic and personal tensions, which are quickly and amicably resolved.

Amidst these challenges, the narrative celebrates the kolkhoz's progress and the spirit of cooperation among its members. Key events include the various stages of the harvest, the ambitious goals of competing brigades, and the evolving relationships between the characters, often punctuated by misunderstandings that resolve with ease. The story culminates in a regional agricultural exhibition, where the collective proudly displays its achievements and a shared vision for modernization.

== Cast ==
- Nina Arkhipova as Vera Groshko
- Nikolay Kryuchkov as Nazar Protsenko
- Viktor Dobrovolsky as Ruban
- Marina Bebutova as Oksana Podpruzhenko
- Anton Dunajsky as Prokopchuk
- Georgi Gumilevsky as Musi Antonovich
- Alla Kazanskaya as Zoological technician
- Muza Krepkogorskaya as Darka
- Mikhail Kuznetsov as Peter Sereda
- Vera Kuznetsova as Ekaterina Matveievna
- Yelena Maksimova as Kolodchka
- Konstantin Sorokin as Teslyuk
- Mikhail Vysotsky as Podpruzhenko
- Zoya Tolbuzina as Vera

== Bibliography ==
- Peter Kenez. Cinema and Soviet Society: From the Revolution to the Death of Stalin. I.B.Tauris, 2001.
