= Where Were You, Odysseus? =

- Written by: Aleksei Azarov
- Directed by: Timur Zoloyev
- Starring: Donatas Banionis; Anatoli Romashin
- Music by: Isaac Schwartz
- Country of origin: Soviet Union
- Original language: Russian

Production
- Cinematography: Vladimir Kromas
- Running time: 211 minutes
- Production company: Odessa Film Studio

Original release
- Release: 1978

Where were you, Odysseus? (Russian: Где ты был, Одиссей?, romanized: Gde ty byl, Odissey?) is a 1978 Soviet three-part television war film directed by Timur Zoloyev.

The film is based on the story of Alexei Azarov's The Road to Zeus, about the actions of Soviet intelligence during the Great Patriotic War.

== Plot ==
In the year 1944, a Soviet intelligence officer acting under the name of the French businessman Auguste Ptigan, accidentally gets into the ranks of Gestapo; who take him for an English spy.

Because of this, the scout gets the opportunity to establish contacts with high ranks of the Gestapo and the Abwehr who understand the inevitability of the defeat of Hitler's army and try to establish contact with the intelligence services of the countries that are part of the anti-Hitler coalition ...

== Cast ==
- Donatas Banionis — Soviet intelligence officer Odyssey (also Ptizhan and Lehman)
- Anatoli Romashin — SS Sturmbannführer Karl Ehrlich
- Irina Tereshchenko — Shafrhurer SS Lotta Bolz
- Georgy Drozd — Oberscharfuhrer SS Vogel
- Lev Perfilov — Doctor Gauk
- Karlis Sebris — Standartenfuhrer SS (Gestapo) Zoller
- Victor Malyarevich — Soviet radio operator Luke
- Erwin Knausmüller — von Arvid
- Peter Kudlai — Standartenfuhrer SS
- Alexander Lazarev — Brigadefuhrer SS Count von Warburg Trottenvalz
