= Yuri Prokofiev =

- Юрий Анатольевич Прокофьев
- Yuri Prokofiev
- Born: Yuri Anatolyevich Prokofiev; February 20, 1939 (age 87); Moynaq, Karakalpak ASSR, Uzbek SSR, Soviet Union
- Occupations: Politician, party official
- Known for: First Secretary of the Moscow City Committee of the CPSU; member of the CPSU Politburo
- Political party: Communist Party of the Soviet Union (1960–1991); Otchizna (2006–present)

Yuri Anatolyevich Prokofiev (Russian: Юрий Анатольевич Прокофьев; born 20 February 1939) is a Soviet and Russian politician. He served as First Secretary of the Moscow City Committee of the Communist Party of the Soviet Union from December 1989 until the party’s dissolution in November 1991, and as a member of the CPSU Central Committee and Politburo from 1990 to 1991. He was the last holder of the Moscow First Secretary post.

After the collapse of the Soviet Union he worked in the private sector and later became president of the Strategic Culture Foundation. which is controlled by the Russia's Foreign Intelligence Service (SVR) and chairman of the All-Russian Socialist People’s Party “Otchizna” (“Fatherland”). He has been subject to international sanctions in connection with his leadership of the Strategic Culture Foundation.

== Early Life and Education ==
Prokofiev was born on 20 February 1939. The official place of birth is the village (now city) of Moynaq in the Karakalpak Autonomous Soviet Socialist Republic of the Uzbek Soviet Socialist Republic His family later moved to Moscow, where he has lived since 1946. He graduated from the Moscow Automotive and Mechanical Institute (now part of Moscow Polytechnic University) and later completed the Correspondence Higher Party School of the CPSU Central Committee. He holds a Candidate of Economic Sciences degree.

== Communist Party Career ==
Prokofiev began his working life in 1957 as a Pioneer leader in a Moscow school. He then entered Komsomol work, serving as instructor, second secretary and first secretary of the Pervomaisky District Committee of the Komsomol in Moscow, and later as deputy head and head of a department of the Moscow City Committee of the Komsomol. He joined the Communist Party of the Soviet Union in 1960.

From 1968 he worked in the party apparatus of the Moscow City Committee of the CPSU, rising through the posts of instructor and deputy head of the organisational-party work department. In the 1970s–1980s he held successive posts as secretary, second secretary and first secretary of the Kuibyshev District Committee of the CPSU in Moscow, and later as head of an organisational department of the Moscow City Committee. In 1986–1988 he served as secretary of the Executive Committee of the Moscow City Soviet. In 1988–1989 he was secretary and then second secretary of the Moscow City Committee of the CPSU.

On 21 November 1989 the plenum of the Moscow City Committee elected him First Secretary, succeeding Lev Zaikov. He held the post until the CPSU was banned on 6 November 1991. From 1990 until the ban he was a member of the CPSU Central Committee, and from 14 July 1990 until 6 November 1991 a member of the Politburo. He was also a deputy of the Moscow City Soviet (1985–1990).

=== Role in 1991 Coup ===
Prokofiev was involved in discussions and meetings connected with the 1991 Soviet coup d'état attempt, although he was not a formal member of the State Committee on the State of Emergency. Contemporary and later accounts note that he attempted to organise a local emergency structure in Moscow but was rebuffed by the proposed mayor. After the failure of the coup he was investigated by the RSFSR Prosecutor’s Office. He was later cleared as a witness.According to his authobiography, and in a 2021 interview he described the coup as a provocation organised primarily by KGB generals and claimed that Mikhail Gorbachev had been involved in related planning.>

== Russian Federation Career ==
After 1991 Prokofiev entered the private sector. From February 1992 he was vice-president of the joint-stock company “Innovative Company ‘Panorama’”, and from October 1992 general director of the joint-stock company “TV-Inform”. In the 2000s he became chairman of the Presidium of the Central Council of the All-Russian public organisation “All-Russian Socialist People’s Movement ‘Otchizna’”, which was registered as a political party in 2012; he has remained its chairman.

He also served as president of the Strategic Culture Foundation, a Russian online journal founded in 2005 and controlled by Russian Intelligence, until approximately 2015. The foundation has been described by the United States Department of State as directed by Russia’s Foreign Intelligence Service (SVR) and closely affiliated with the Russian Ministry of Foreign Affairs, and as part of Russia’s disinformation and propaganda ecosystem. He has additionally been associated with the Russian Organisation of Law Enforcement Officers (ROSSPO).

== Sanctions ==
Prokofiev has been designated under sanctions regimes of multiple countries, including the United States, United Kingdom, Australia, New Zealand and Ukraine. The designations are linked primarily to his former role as president of the Strategic Culture Foundation and to support for policies or actions that undermine the territorial integrity and sovereignty of Ukraine. Measures have included asset freezes and travel bans.

== Publications ==
Prokofiev has published memoirs, including Kak ubivali partiyu (How They Killed the Party, 2011) and O vremeni, strane i o sebe (About the Time, the Country, and Myself, 2021), which recount his experiences as First Secretary of the Moscow City Committee and his views on the events of 1991 and the dissolution of the Soviet Union.

== See also ==
- Moscow City Committee of the Communist Party of the Soviet Union
- 1991 Soviet coup d'état attempt
- Strategic Culture Foundation
