= Lesya Ukrainka National Academic Theater =

Drama theater in Kyiv, Ukraine

Lesya Ukrainka National Academic Theater of Drama
- Bourgogne Theatre
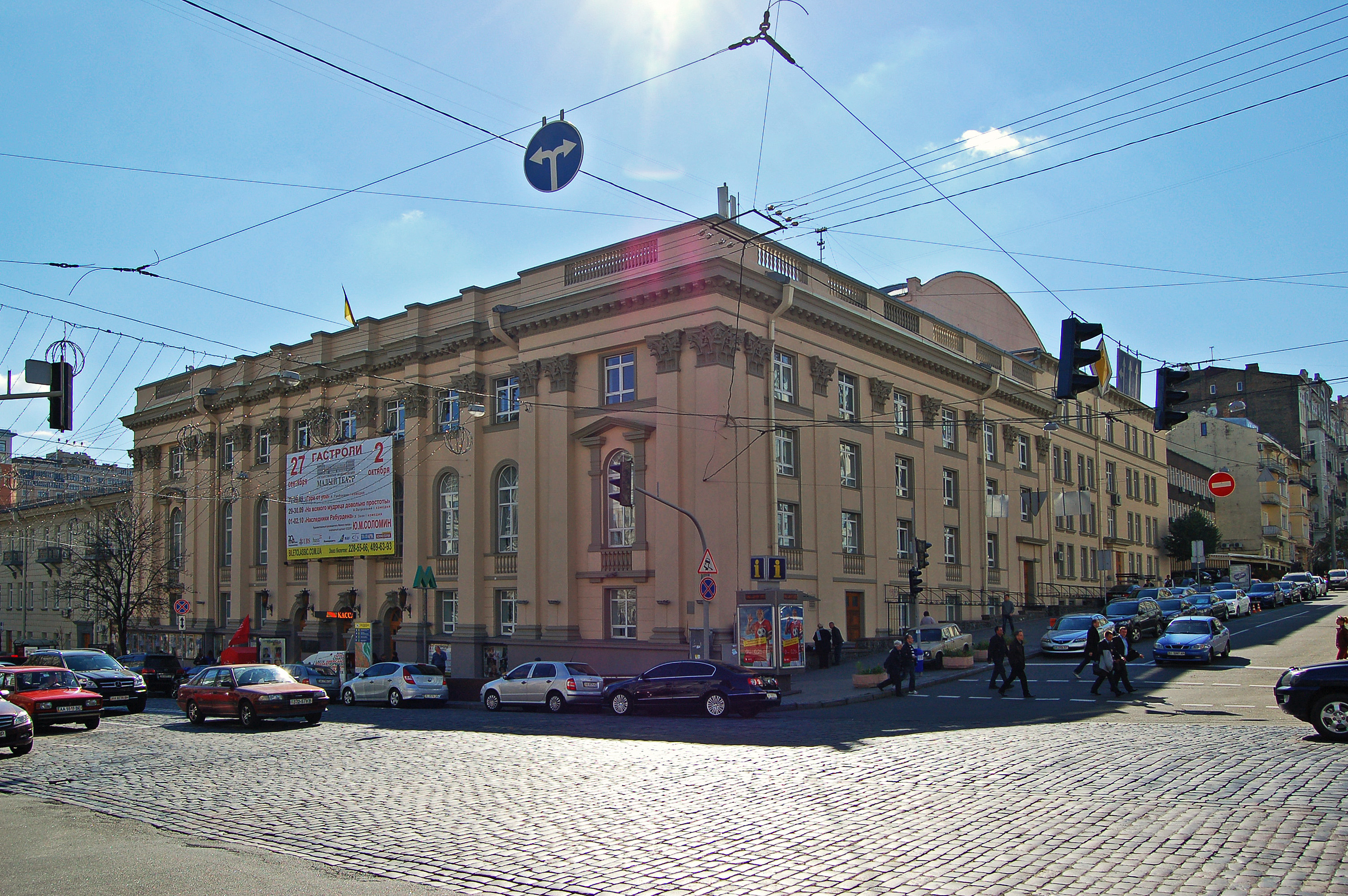
- Interactive map of Lesya Ukrainka National Academic Theater of Drama
- Address: Kyiv; Ukraine
- Coordinates: 50.445°N 30.518611°E
- Operator: Lesya Ukrainka National Academic Theater of Drama

Construction
- Opened: 1875
- Architect: Vladimir Nikolayev

Tenants
- 1875–1891 Kyiv city circus; 1891–1898 Solovtsov Theater; 1896–1914 Cinema theater

Website
- https://lesyatheatre.com.ua/

Immovable Monument of National Significance of Ukraine
- Official name: Будинок Державного академічного театру імені Лесі Українки (Театр Бергоньє), де відбувся перший виступ української професійної трупи М. Кропивницького (Building of the Lesya Ukrainka State Academic Theater (Bourgogne Theater), where the first performance of the Ukrainian professional troupe of M. Kropyvnytsky took place)
- Type: Architecture, History
- Reference no.: 260053-Н

Lesya Ukrainka National Academic Theater (also referred to as Lesya Ukrainka Theater) (Ukrainian: Національний академічний драматичний театр імені Лесі Українки, romanized: Natsionalnyi akademichnyi dramatychnyi teatr imeni Lesi Ukrainky) is a theater in Kyiv, Ukraine. It is located in a building known as Bourgogne Theatre.

The theatre traces its roots to the Solovtsov theatric troupe that existed in Kyiv since 1891 and also performed in the Bourgogne Theatre. Later the troupe was named as the Russian Drama Theatre.

== History ==
=== Bourgogne Theatre ===
The building was originally designed in 1875 by Vladimir Nikolayev and sponsored by a French entrepreneur Augustin Bourgogne. At first it housed the Kyiv city circus. From 1891 to 1898 the building was leased to the first drama company in Kyiv, Solovtsov Theater. In 1896 the theater put on its first cinema showing.

=== Modern times ===
Founded in 1926 the present company has been in the building since 1929, and it was named after Lesya Ukrainka in 1941.

Many current movie actors have started their career in the theater.

In July 2022, due to the February 2022 Russian invasion of Ukraine was renamed from Lesya Ukrainka National Academic Theater of Russian Drama to Lesya Ukrainka National Academic Theater.

== Productions ==
In the 2000s the theater produced plays of Russian and Ukrainian dramatic art. Its repertoire consisted then of plays by famous playwrights such as Fyodor Dostoevsky, Mikhail Bulgakov and others.

In the years prior to the 2022 Russian invasion of Ukraine most of the performances were in Russian. In the announcement (in July 2022) of the renaming from Lesya Ukrainka National Academic Theater of Russian Drama to Lesya Ukrainka National Academic Theater Minister of Culture Oleksandr Tkachenko stated that "Fans of theatrical art will be able to view quality performances of Ukrainian and foreign authors now in Ukrainian." From June 2023 to May 2024 all productions were performed in the Ukrainian language and none were written by Russian authors.

== See also ==
- Ivan Franko National Academic Drama Theater, the original Solovtsov Theater building
