= The Road to "Saturn" =

- Russian: Путь в «Сатурн»
- Directed by: Villen Azarov
- Written by: Vasili Ardamatsky; Villen Azarov; Mikhail Bleiman
- Starring: Mikhail Volkov; Georgiy Zhzhonov; Arkadi Tolbuzin; Yevgeny Kuznetsov; Leonid Chubarov
- Cinematography: Mark Dyatlov
- Music by: Aleksandr Flyarkovsky
- Release date: 1967
- Running time: 83 minutes
- Country: Soviet Union
- Language: Russian

The Road to "Saturn" (Russian: Путь в «Сатурн») is a 1967 Soviet spy action war film directed by Villen Azarov.

== Plot ==
The film tells about Soviet intelligence agents who infiltrated the Saturn, German espionage center, engaged in subversive activities against the Russians. They gained access to classified information that would help them fulfill their mission...

== Cast ==
- Mikhail Volkov as Krylov / Kramer
- Georgiy Zhzhonov as Timerin
- Arkadi Tolbuzin as Drobot (as A. Tolbuzin)
- Yevgeny Kuznetsov as Simakov
- Leonid Chubarov
- Vladimir Ferapontov
- Grigoriy Gay
- Lyudmila Shaposhnikova
- Valentina Talyzina
