= I Shall Never Forget =

- Russian: Я тебя никогда не забуду
- Directed by: Pavel Kadochnikov
- Written by: Pavel Kadochnikov
- Starring: Irina Malysheva; Evgeniy Karelskikh; Pavel Kadochnikov; Viktor Shulgin; Gennadiy Nilov
- Cinematography: Aleksandr Chirov
- Edited by: V. Nesterova
- Music by: Vladislav Kladnitsky
- Release date: 1983
- Running time: 86 minute
- Country: Soviet Union
- Language: Russian

I Shall Never Forget (Russian: Я тебя никогда не забуду) is a 1983 Soviet drama film directed by Pavel Kadochnikov.

== Plot ==
Nurse Polina is trying to save the life of a soldier Fedor and for this, she has to sacrifice her blood. They are sent to the hospital. Time passes and he calls Polina his wife and goes to the front, gets captured, participates in battles in France. Returning home, Fedor finds out that Polina now has a child and she left.

== Cast ==
- Irina Malysheva
- Evgeniy Karelskikh
- Pavel Kadochnikov
- Viktor Shulgin
- Gennadiy Nilov
- Lyubov Sokolova
- Elena Drapeko
- Anatoliy Rudakov
- Lyudmila Kupina
- Elektrina Korneeva-Levitan
