= The Snow Maiden (1968 film) =

1968 film by Pavel Kadochnikov

- Russian: Снегурочка
- Directed by: Pavel Kadochnikov
- Written by: D. Del; Pavel Kadochnikov; Aleksandr Ostrovskiy
- Produced by: Grigory Prusovsky
- Starring: Yevgenia Filonova; Evgeny Zharikov; Irina Gubanova; Boris Khimichev; Pavel Kadochnikov
- Music by: Vladislav Kladnitskiy
- Production company: Lenfilm
- Release date: 1968
- Running time: 90 min.
- Country: Soviet Union
- Language: Russian

The Snow Maiden (Russian: Снегурочка, romanized: Snegurochka) is a 1968 Soviet musical fantasy film directed by Pavel Kadochnikov.

== Plot ==
In the Berendey village, a beautiful but emotionless girl, Snegurochka (the Snow Maiden), appears. Although many young men admire her, including the charming Lel, her heart remains cold, and she shows no affection in return.

Kupava and Mizgir, a betrothed couple, attend a festival with Kupava's friends. However, upon seeing Snegurochka, Mizgir abandons Kupava, publicly declaring that he no longer loves her and has fallen for Snegurochka instead. Accused of inconstancy, Mizgir defends himself, saying, "The heart knows no command. I loved Kupava before, but now I love Snegurochka."

At a gathering, the Berendey king decrees that whoever can win Snegurochka's love before dawn, as the Sun God Yarilo rises, will marry her. As the villagers form couples, Lel pairs with Kupava, giving her a chance to move on from her heartbreak.

Snegurochka, longing to experience love, pleads with her mother, Spring, to grant her the ability to love. She awakens to her feelings and falls in love with Mizgir. However, as they approach Yarilo at sunrise, the sun's warmth melts Snegurochka, and she vanishes.

== Cast ==
- Yevgenia Filonova as Snegurochka
- Evgeny Zharikov as Lel
- Irina Gubanova as Kupava
- Boris Khimichev as Misghir
- Pavel Kadochnikov as Tsar Berendey
- Natalya Klimova as Vesna
- Valeri Malyshev as Brusilo
- Sergey Filippov as Bermyata
- Boris Shcherbakov as young man
- Andrey Apsolon as Bakula
