= To Award (Posthumously) =

- Russian: Наградить (посмертно)
- Directed by: Boris Grigoryev
- Written by: Sergei Aleksandrov
- Starring: Aleksandr Timoshkin; Evgeniy Leonov-Gladyshev; Mikhail Zhigalov; Marina Yakovleva; Georgiy Drozd
- Cinematography: Valeri Ginzburg
- Music by: Georgiy Dmitriev
- Release date: 1986
- Country: Soviet Union
- Language: Russian

To Award (Posthumously) (Russian: Наградить (посмертно)) is a 1986 Soviet crime action film directed by Boris Grigoryev.

== Plot ==
The film takes place in the winter of 1945. The film tells about the front-line intelligence officer Yuri Sosnin, who ended up in the hospital as a result of shell shock. The authorities believed that he was dead and decided to reward him posthumously. After discharge, he got a job as a driver, not remembering anything, and was involved in gang warfare.

== Cast ==
- Aleksandr Timoshkin
- Evgeniy Leonov-Gladyshev
- Mikhail Zhigalov
- Marina Yakovleva
- Georgiy Drozd
- Vladimir Steklov
- Yury Katin-Yartsev
- Georgiy Yumatov
- Marina Levtova
