= Viktor Dobrovolsky =

Soviet and Ukrainian film and theater actor

People's Artist Viktor Dobrovolsky
- Віктор Добровольський
- Born: 23 January 1906; Odesa, Russian Empire
- Died: 28 July 1984 (aged 78); Kyiv, Ukrainian SSR, Soviet Union
- Occupation: Actor
- Years active: 1922–1984

Viktor Mykolaiovych Dobrovolsky (Note: Ukrainian: Віктор Миколайович Добровольський, romanized: Viktor Mykolaiovych Dobrovolskyi; Russian: Виктор Николаевич Добровольский, romanized: Viktor Nikolayevich Dobrovolsky) (23 January 1906 – 28 July 1984), was a Soviet and Ukrainian film and theater actor. People's Artist of the USSR (1960).

== Biography ==
In 1928, he graduated from the drama school at Odessa drama theatre. In 1922, he began his stage career. Worked in theatres of Odessa, Kharkiv, Donetsk. In 1944–1956 — actor in the troupe of Ukrainian music and drama theatre named after Ivan Franko in Kiev. In the years 1964–1984 — the leading actor of the Kiev drama theatre named after Lesya Ukrainka. Since 1926 were in the movie. A member of the Union of cinematographers of the Ukrainian SSR.

Died in Kiev on July 28, 1984. He was buried on Baikove Cemetery.

== Selected filmography ==
- 1926 – Taras Shevchenko
- 1938 – Pyotr Pervyy
- 1940 – Makar Nechay
- 1944 – The Ural Front
- 1947 – Secret Agent
- 1951 – Bountiful Summer
- 1953 – Adventure in Odessa
- 1954 – Komandir Korablya
- 1956 – Trista Let Tomu...
- 1959 – Nebo Zovyot

== Honors ==
- Honoured Artist of the Ukrainian SSR (1943)
- Medal "For Valiant Labour in the Great Patriotic War 1941–1945"
- People's Artist of the Ukrainian SSR (1948)
- People's Artist of the USSR (1960)
- Stalin Prize second degree (1951)
- State Prize of the USSR named after Taras Shevchenko (1983) – for the creation of images of Soviet contemporaries in the performances on stage KATRD name L.Ukrainki
- Order of Lenin (1951)
- Order of the Red Banner of Labor (1966)
- Order of Cyril and Methodius I degree (Bulgaria
