= Boris Barnet =

Soviet film director and screenwriter (1902–1965)

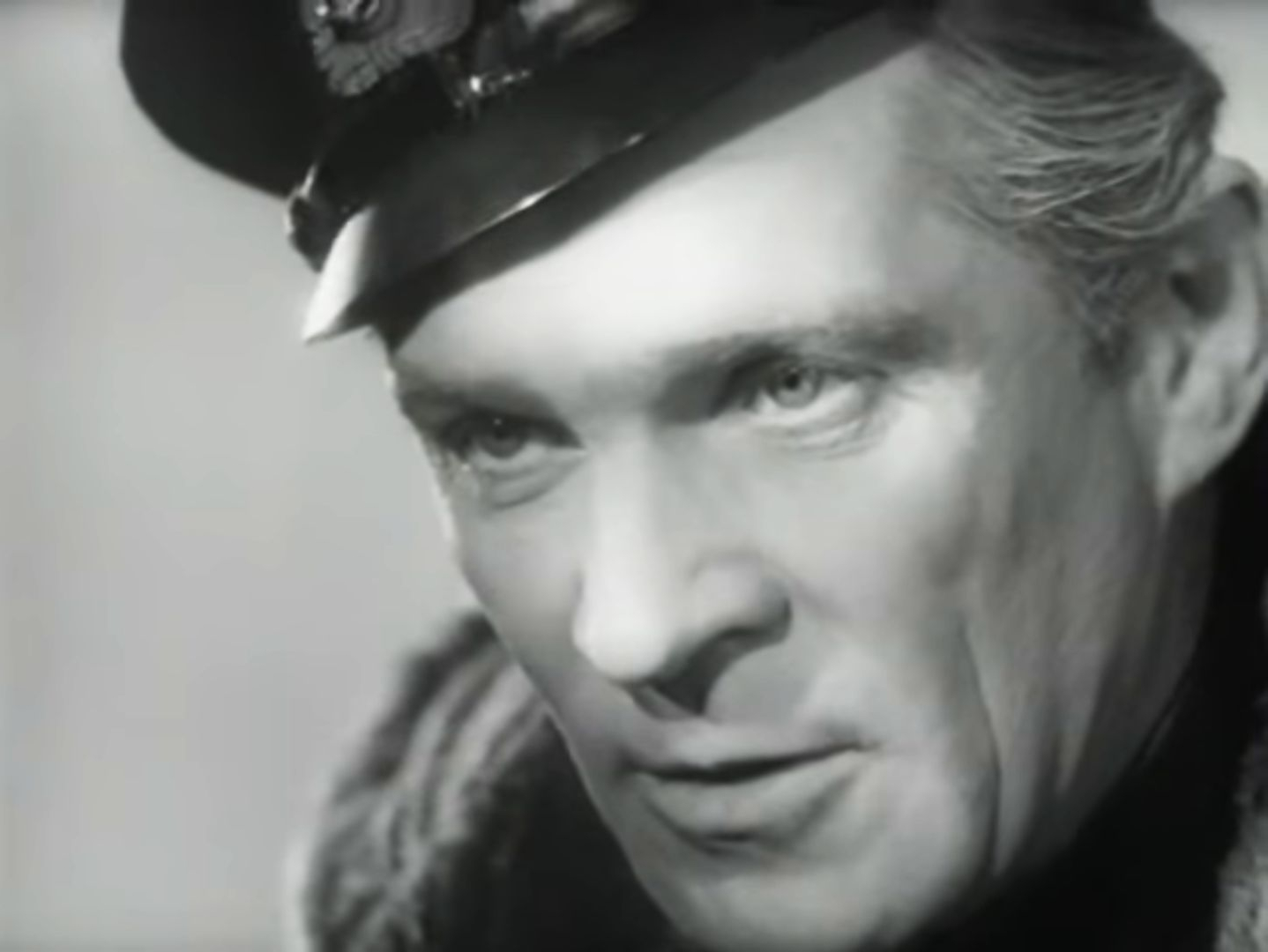
- Barnet in Sinegoriya (1946)
- Born: Boris Vasilyevich Barnet; 18 June 1902; Moscow, Russia
- Died: 8 January 1965 (aged 62); Riga, Latvian SSR, Soviet Union
- Occupations: Film director; screenwriter
- Years active: 1927–1963
- Spouses: Natalia Glan (m. 1926; died 1927); Yelena Kuzmina (m. 1928; div. 1936); Valentina Barnet (divorced); Alla Kazanskaya
- Children: 2, including Olga

Boris Vasilyevich Barnet (Russian: Борис Васильевич Барнет; 18 June 1902 – 8 January 1965) was a Soviet film director, actor and screenwriter of British heritage. He directed 27 films between 1927 and 1963. Barnet was awarded the titles of Merited Artist of the Russian SFSR in 1935 and Merited Artist of the Ukrainian SSR in 1951.

== Early years ==
Boris Barnet was born in Moscow. His grandfather Thomas Barnet was a printer who moved to the Russian Empire from the United Kingdom in the 19th century. A student of the Moscow Art School, he volunteered to join the Red Army at age 18 and was then professionally involved in boxing.

In 1923, Barnet graduated from the Central Military School for Physical Education and worked as a sports teacher. At the same time he studied in Lev Kuleshov's film workshop. Barnet was cast as Cowboy Jeddy in the slapstick The Extraordinary Adventures of Mr. West in the Land of the Bolsheviks (1924) by Kuleshov. Its popularity encouraged him to begin a professional film career; Barnet learned filmmaking technique from scratch, with colleagues and friends such as Vsevolod Pudovkin, Sergei Komarov, Porfirii Podobed, Aleksandra Khokhlova, Sergei Galadzhev, and Leonid Obolenskii. His directorial debut, the comedic thriller Miss Mend (1926, based on a 1923 novel by Marietta Shaginian, codirected with Fedor Otsep), featured car chases and complicated stuntwork, all of which made the film a box-office hit for its production company, Mezhrabpomfilm Studio.

In 1927 he shot his first solo feature, a comedy film, The Girl with a Hatbox, starring Anna Sten. His 1928 melodramatic film The House on Trubnaya, starring Vera Maretskaya, was rediscovered in the mid-1990s and now ranks as one of the classic Russian silent films.

Encouraged in his early efforts by Yakov Protazanov, Barnet emerged in the 1930s as one of the country's leading film-makers, working with the likes of Serafima Birman and Nikolai Erdman. Outskirts (1933), a pacifist story acclaimed at the first Venice Film Festival, is considered one of Barnet's masterpieces. Set in tsarist Russia during World War I, it portrays a group of provincial townsfolk: a shoemaker, his daughter who falls in love with a German POW, and two brothers volunteering for the front.

== Later years and work ==
Barnet's postwar work is exemplified by Secret Agent, the first Soviet spy film. The Stalin Prize-winning film was also years ahead of its time in exhibiting Hitchcockian influence and tricks and helped cement Barnet's reputation abroad.

It was Barnet's gift of artistic invention that made him stand out from the crowd of Soviet colleagues. In a Barnet film, a photograph in the newspaper would unexpectedly come alive, and scenes would often end with a detail introducing the next scene. He would begin a scene with a close up, "so that the space is progressively discovered by changing the axis or by camera movement". Among Russian filmmakers professing their admiration for Barnet was Andrei Tarkovsky. French film historian Georges Sadoul once called him "the best Soviet comedy director."

In 1965, after some years of artistic silence, Barnet committed suicide in Riga, Latvian SSR by hanging himself in a hotel room. He was survived by wife Alla Kazanskaya (1920–2008) and daughter Olga Barnet (1951–2021).

== Filmography ==
As director

- Miss Mend (Мисс Менд) (1926)
- The Girl with a Hatbox (Девушка с коробкой)(1927)
- Moscow in October (Москва в Октябре) (1927)
- The House on Trubnaya (Дом на Трубной) (1928)
- Living Things (Живые дела) (1930)
- The Ghost (Привидения) (1931)
- The Thaw (Ледолом) (1931)
- Outskirts (Окраина) (1933)
- By the Bluest of Seas (У самого синего моря) (1936)
- A Night in September (Ночь в сентябре) (1939)
- The Old Horseman (Старый наездник) (1940) output to the screen in 1959
- A Good Lad (Славный малый) (1942)
- Dark Is the Night (Однажды ночью) (1945)
- Secret Agent (Подвиг разведчика) (1947)
- Pages of Life (Страницы жизни) (1948)
- Bountiful Summer (Щедрое лето) (1950)
- Lyana (Ляна) (1955)
- The Poet (Поэт) (1956)
- The Wrestler and the Clown (Борец и клоун) (1957)
- Annushka (Аннушка) (1959)
- Alyonka (Алёнка) (1961)
- Whistle Stop (Полустанок) (1963)

As actor

- The Extraordinary Adventures of Mr. West in the Land of the Bolsheviks (1924)
- Miss Mend (1926)
- Storm Over Asia (1928)
- The Living Corpse (1929)
- Secret Agent (Подвиг разведчика) (1947)
