= Plotnikova (disambiguation) =

Plotnikova is the feminine form of the surname Plotnikov

Plotnikova may also refer to:

- Plotnikova, Kudymkarsky district, village in Kudymkarsky district, Perm Krai, Russia
- Plotnikova, Ilyinsky district, village in Ilyinsky district, Perm Krai, Russia
- Plotnikova (river), river in the western Kamchatka Peninsula, Russia
