= The Living and the Dead =

The Living and the Dead may refer to:

- The Living and the Dead (1964 film), a Soviet film by Alexander Stolper (based on the Simonov novel)
- The Living and the Dead (2006 film), a British drama by Simon Rumley
- The Living and the Dead (2007 film), a Croatian war movie by Kristijan Milic
- The Living and the Dead (Jolie Holland album), 2008
- The Living and the Dead (Cruachan album), 2023
- The Living and the Dead (Boileau-Narcejac novel), a 1954 novel by Pierre Boileau and Pierre Ayraud
- The Living and the Dead (White novel), a 1941 novel by Patrick White
- The Living and the Dead (Simonov novel), a 1959 novel by Konstantin Simonov
- The Living and the Dead (TV series), a British supernatural drama television series
- The Living and the Dead: Robert McNamara and Five Lives of a Lost War, a 1996 book by Paul Hendrickson
- The Living and the Dead, a 2025 crime novel by Christoffer Carlsson
