= The Road (1955 film) =

- Directed by: Aleksandr Stolper
- Written by: Sergei Yermolinsky
- Starring: Andrei Popov; Nikolai Gritsenko; Yevgeny Leonov
- Music by: Nikolai Kryukov
- Production company: Mosfilm
- Release date: 3 October 1955
- Running time: 103 minutes
- Country: Soviet Union
- Language: Russian

The Road (Russian: Дорога, romanized: Doroga) is a 1955 Soviet action adventure film directed by Aleksandr Stolper and starring Andrei Popov and Nikolai Gritsenko.

== Plot ==
On a newly constructed mountain road in the eastern USSR, dozens of vehicles carrying passengers and cargo are stranded due to heavy snowfall. Among those stuck are a State Security captain and "Swedish Professor Raiding," who is, in fact, Reginald Sniders, a foreign intelligence agent. The next morning, despite the ongoing blizzard, the convoy sets out to tackle the mountain pass.

== Cast ==
- Andrei Popov as Sergei Ignatyevich Baitalin
- Vitaly Doronin as Fyodor Ivanovich
- Nikolai Gritsenko as Ivan Alekseyevich
- Tamara Loginova as Yekaterina Andreyevna Fyodorova
- Lev Sverdlin as Beimbetov
- Viktor Avdyushko as Vasya
- Yevgeny Matveyev as Grigory Ivanovich Polipchuk
- Yevgeny Leonov as Pasha Yeskov
- Nikolai Sergeyev as Pavel Petrovich Falkovsky
- Vladimir Kenigson as Reginald Snyders

== Bibliography ==
- Rollberg, Peter. Historical Dictionary of Russian and Soviet Cinema. Scarecrow Press, 2008.
