= Days and Nights (1944 novel) =

1944 war novel by Konstantin Simonov

Days and Nights (Russian: Дни и ночи) is a 1944 novel by Soviet war correspondent and author Konstantin Simonov about the Battle of Stalingrad. The novel was translated into English and published in the U.S. in November 1945, where it remained on the fiction best seller list for eleven weeks. One American reviewer labeled it "the best Soviet book so far published here about what the Russians call 'The Great Patriotic War'." Simonov would go on to write the more critically acclaimed World War II trilogy, The Living and the Dead, but at the time of his death in 1979, Days and Nights was the work he was most known for internationally.

== Synopsis ==
The novel begins with a quote from Alexander Pushkin's narrative poem Poltava, including the lines:

More than one sudden, bloody lesson
Came at the hands of a foreign foe.
But in the long ordeal,
Surviving all the blows of fate,
Russia grew strong.
Thus a heavy sledge, which smashes glass,
Can also forge a sword.

In September 1942, 29-year-old Captain Alexei Saburov waits at a train station in the village of Eltonskaya, east of the Volga River. He meets Colonel Babchenko and is told to assemble members of a new battalion and ferry across the river to Stalingrad, where the Red Army has been engaged in fierce fighting with German forces for over a month. The river crossing uses a barge and small steamer to transport all the equipment, soldiers, and medical staff. Prior to reaching the west bank of the Volga, the steamer is bombarded by German shells, and numerous passengers fall into the water. Saburov, a tall man and a strong swimmer, rescues an 18-year-old hospital assistant, Anya Klimenko, with whom he had been speaking during the crossing.

In a midnight officers' meeting with Babchenko and Colonel Protsenko, Saburov is ordered to retake three Stalingrad apartment buildings that were recently seized by the Germans. Saburov divides his battalion into three companies; each is tasked with capturing a building in a surprise night attack. The operation succeeds, and Saburov sets up a command post in the basement of the building that he led the attack on. Protsenko visits the command post and warns Saburov how hard it will be—with no reinforcements coming—to fight off German counterattacks and retain control of the buildings:

"[Y]ou've got to teach the men... Day and night you've got to teach them. Because if you don't train a soldier today, then tomorrow he'll get himself killed. And not simply killed. Getting killed, after all—that's what war is for, but to be killed stupidly and cheaply, that's what's sad."

In the morning, the Germans launch an assault on Saburov's building. The battle lasts for three days. Twice the Germans reach the walls of the building, but both times they are repelled. Nazi corpses pile up under the windows. Ammunition is running low. Saburov gives bullets only to those who are good shots, while the rest get grenades. He encounters Anya Klimenko again when she is helping to carry out his wounded. He learns from her that she was raised in Stalingrad. Her mother is still alive, but her father has gone missing in the war, and her eldest brother was killed. Anya collapses from fatigue and sleeps for hours on Saburov's cot while he handles his daily duties in and out of the command post. He realizes during this time that he has started to develop romantic feelings for her.

In a key episode, Ivan Vassiliev, a scout who has become a traitor, attempts to lure Saburov into a Nazi trap. Vassiliev, Saburov, and a soldier named Petrov crawl across no man's land at night to reconnoiter a location that Vassiliev has suggested could be a staging area for an attack to capture a German company. Just before they reach the destination (where German soldiers are waiting), a mortar shell destroys a brick wall and buries Saburov under hundreds of bricks. With his plans for the trap disrupted, Vassiliev fatally stabs Petrov and is intending to do the same to Saburov. But the captain, who by now has recognized that Vassiliev is a German spy, manages to quietly dislodge enough bricks to free his right hand. He speaks in a whisper to Vassiliev so that the latter will have to lean closer to hear. At an opportune moment, Saburov grabs Vassiliev by the throat and strangles him to death. The captain, still pinned under the bricks and suffering from many broken bones, is eventually rescued by his battalion and sent east of the Volga to recover, first in a hospital and then in the nearby home of Anya's mother. There, he and Anya vow their love for each other and make plans to marry.

In early November, the Germans break through to the Volga and cut off telephone communications between Soviet regiments along the river. Saburov is back on duty and assigned a dangerous mission by General Protsenko: to personally deliver a message to Colonel Remizov, who is stranded in an isolated position with his regiment. The mission requires traversing in pitch-black darkness the shore of the west bank of the Volga. Saburov must do so under the German-controlled bluffs, without being detected and shot by sentries, and then climb up the cliff to Remizov's dugout. Next, Saburov must repeat the journey to bring Remizov's reply to the general. The messages involve plans for an offensive that will push the Germans away from the river and restore Soviet communication lines.

For 70 days and nights, the fighting rages on the streets of Stalingrad. Finally, Saburov and the other surviving soldiers hear the roar of Soviet artillery in the distance and understand that a massive Red Army surge is underway, which will tip the balance of forces in their favor in the Battle of Stalingrad.

== Characters ==
- General Pyotr Matveyev, member of the Red Army Military Council
- Colonel Alexander Protsenko (later General), in command of the 693rd Rifle Division
- Lieutenant Colonel Philip Babchenko, in command of a regiment of the 693rd
- Captain Alexei Saburov, in command of the 2nd Battalion of this regiment
- Colonel Sergei Remizov, successor to Babchenko after the latter's death
- Anya Klimenko, nurse and hospital assistant
- Lieutenant Maslennikov, chief of staff to Saburov
- Vanin, political instructor in Saburov's battalion
- Petya, Saburov's orderly
- Konyukov, soldier in Saburov's battalion
- Petrov, soldier in Saburov's battalion
- Vassiliev, scout in Saburov's battalion
- Avdeyev, newspaper correspondent from Moscow

== Publication ==
Simonov's dramatized account of the Battle of Stalingrad first appeared in serialized installments in the Moscow magazine Znamya; it was published as a book in the summer of 1944. As of November 1945, about 400,000 copies had been sold in the Soviet Union.

In the U.S., it debuted in serialized form in New York City's Russian-language newspaper, Novoye Russkoye Slovo. The book was then translated by Joseph Barnes for publication by Simon & Schuster. With a publicity boost from a Book-of-the-Month Club endorsement, the initial printing was for 370,000 copies. Days and Nights entered The New York Times fiction best seller list on November 18, 1945. It remained there until the following February, achieving a highest ranking of #9 in January 1946.

== Reception ==
Days and Nights was published in the USSR while the war was ongoing, and was therefore subject to heightened political scrutiny. The Soviet paper Literatura Iskusstvo complained that Simonov wrote with "a nerveless and indifferent hand", i.e., his novel was not sufficiently emotional and patriotic. The Bolshevik periodical faulted the author for dwelling more on officers than enlisted men: "The portrait of the common soldier, who grew up in Soviet reality, has remained outside Simonov's view. Without this, the picture of the fighting at Stalingrad loses greatly." The character of Vassiliev, a Red Army man who sells out to the Germans, was repugnant to Soviet critics who believed "the book would give a fairer picture of Soviet resistance without the traitor." When the PresLit literary agency learned that Joseph Barnes was creating an English translation, PresLit offered its "official" translation, sent from Moscow. Barnes discovered it had 50 pages less because all passages involving Vassiliev had been removed.

On the eve of the novel's U.S. release, John Hersey predicted in The New Yorker that Days and Nights "will almost certainly be the first work of a Soviet writer to be sold in greater numbers in America than in Russia." Hersey added that one of the attractions of Simonov's work for American readers is that

Everything is understated. The novel is written almost as dryly as if the author were English. Its episodes are extremely stirring, and yet nothing is written in a grand or boastful manner. Simonov focusses throughout the novel on half a dozen characters in a battalion command post. The battalion holds only three shattered, forlorn buildings in Stalingrad. The characters do heroic things, but they behave very much like soldiers of any country and any time doing heroic things—fearfully, dully, wearily, and dutifully. The characters are not fully developed, but they have the virtue of indulging in none of the fulmination which, makes much Soviet writing hard for Americans to stomach.

TIME magazine made a similar point that Days and Nights "is more effective than most contemporary Soviet fiction because the Communist drum-beating is more muffled." A Canadian reviewer stated that "an impressive feature of the book is its honesty. It contains no propaganda, and none of the familiar line about inspired Stalinists exterminating the Hitlerite hordes for the glory of the proletariat. It deals with men strictly as human beings, and leaves politics to the commissars." In Books Abroad, Alfred Werner said the love story between Captain Saburov and Anya Klimenko is "touchingly told, and unforgettable is the account of Saburov and his men who, in defiance of the terrific German fire, seize and hold three apartment houses."

In The New York Times, Gerald W. Johnson wrote that "the superb merit of the book...is its series of portraits of men in battle." He continued:

Mr. Simonov handles his material skillfully, if not altogether perfectly. The conclusion is disappointing—indeed, there is no conclusion. It is rather as if the author, exhausted by his mighty effort, simply quit. Hero and heroine are lost in the vortex of war and one suspects that Simonov really doesn't care what happened to them after that. Yet perhaps it is the only way to end such a story. The book is aptly described on the jacket as "massive" and to try to make it end neatly and tidily would have been atrociously bad art.

== Adaptations ==
A Soviet film adaptation, with a screenplay by Konstantin Simonov and directed by Aleksandr Stolper, was produced by Mosfilm in 1944. The film premiered in the U.S. in April 1946.
