= Wait for Me (1943 film) =

- Directed by: Aleksandr Stolper; Boris Ivanov
- Written by: Konstantin Simonov; Aleksandr Stolper
- Starring: Boris Blinov; Valentina Serova; Lev Sverdlin
- Cinematography: Samuil Rubashkin
- Edited by: Yevgeniya Abdirkina
- Music by: Nikolai Kryukov
- Production company: TsOKS
- Release date: 1 November 1943
- Running time: 90 minutes
- Country: Soviet Union
- Language: Russian

Wait for Me (Russian: Жди меня, romanized: Zhdi menya) is a 1943 Soviet World War II film directed by Boris Ivanov and Aleksandr Stolper and starring Boris Blinov, Valentina Serova and Lev Sverdlin.

The film's art direction was by Artur Berger and Vladimir Kamsky.

== Synopsis ==
Three friends, Misha Weinstein (a journalist) and Nikolai Yermolov and Andrei Panov (both pilots) promise each other to meet after the war.

During a reconnaissance mission, the plane carrying Yermolov and Panov gets shot down by the Nazis, and the two take refuge in an abandoned hut where they decide to defend themselves to the very last breath. Meanwhile, Weinstein is ordered to deliver intelligence to the front line. Panov dies, and Yermolov makes his way to the partisans and becomes a commander of one of the units. At this time, Yermolov's friends believe he has died as well. Only his wife Lisa maintains hope.

Weinstein arrives behind enemy lines to interview a successful guerrilla commander and unexpectedly discovers it is his old friend Yermolov. Weinstein tries to return to friendly territory with the news of Yermolov's survival but his plane is shot down and the correspondent dies. The letter does not reach its destination.

When Yermolov returns home he meets his wife, who in spite of everything has waited for him all this time.

== Cast ==
- Boris Blinov as Nikolai Yermolov
- Valentina Serova as Lisa
- Lev Sverdlin as Misha Weinstein
- Mikhail Nazvanov as Andrei Panov
- Nina Zorskaya
- Yelena Tyapkina as Mariya
- Andrei Apsolon as Gunner
- Lyudmila Glazova
- Pavel Geraga as Fedya
- Andrey Martynov as Partisan
- Ekaterina Sipavina as Pasha

== Bibliography ==
- Rollberg, Peter. Historical Dictionary of Russian and Soviet Cinema. Scarecrow Press, 2008.
