= Lad from Our Town =

- Russian: Парень из нашего города
- Directed by: Boris Ivanov; Aleksandr Stolper
- Written by: Konstantin Simonov
- Produced by: V. Gutin
- Starring: Nikolai Kryuchkov; Lidiya Smirnova
- Music by: Nikolai Kryukov
- Production company: Kazakhfilm
- Release date: 31 August 1942
- Running time: 84 min.
- Country: Soviet Union
- Language: Russian

Lad from Our Town (Russian: Парень из нашего города, romanized: Paren iz nashego goroda) is a 1942 Soviet World War II film directed by Boris Ivanov and Aleksandr Stolper.

The film follows Saratovite Sergey Lukonin, who leaves his bride to attend tank school in Omsk, and later finds himself battling in the Spanish Civil War, surviving captivity and escape, only to face the harsh realities of the Great Patriotic War ahead.

The film is based on the play by Konstantin Simonov.

== Plot ==
In the summer of 1932, Sergey Lukonin, a young man from Saratov (played by Nikolai Kryuchkov), leaves his hometown for the distant city of Omsk to attend a tank school. His fiancée, Varenka, stays behind in Saratov, where she eventually becomes an actress. In 1936, Sergey heads to the Spanish Civil War, where he is captured by the Germans. Attempting to disguise himself as a Frenchman, he is betrayed when the Germans recognize him by his accent and try to force him to admit he is Russian. However, circumstances allow Sergey to escape. He returns to battle, determined to explore the capabilities of Soviet tanks.

In 1941, with the onset of the Great Patriotic War, Sergey, like millions of Soviet citizens, finds himself at the frontlines, where he reunites with an old acquaintance—the German who interrogated him during the Spanish War.

== Songs ==
- March of the Soviet Tankmen Music: Pokrass brothers. Lyrics: Boris Laskin.
- Wait for Me Music: Matvey Blanter. Lyrics: Knstantin Simonov. Performed by Vera Krasovitskaya.
- Romance of Varya Music: Nikolai Kryukov. Lyrics: Natalya Konchalovskaya.

== Cast ==
- Nikolai Kryuchkov as Sergei Lukonin
- Nikolay Bogolyubov as Dr. Arkady Andreyevich Burmin
- Lidiya Smirnova as Varya Lukonina-Burmina
- Vladimir Kandelaki as Vano Guliashvili
- Nikolay Mordvinov as Aleksei Petrovich Vasnetsov
- Nina Zorskaya as Zhenya Burmin
- V. Stepanov as Sevostyanov
- Valery Medvedev as Petka
- Aleksandr Rumnev as translator
- Pyotr Lyubeshkin as Safonov
- Anatoly Alekseyev as Volodya
- Grigory Shpigel as German officer (uncredited)
