= Konstantin Simonov =

Soviet writer (1915–1979)

- Константин Симонов
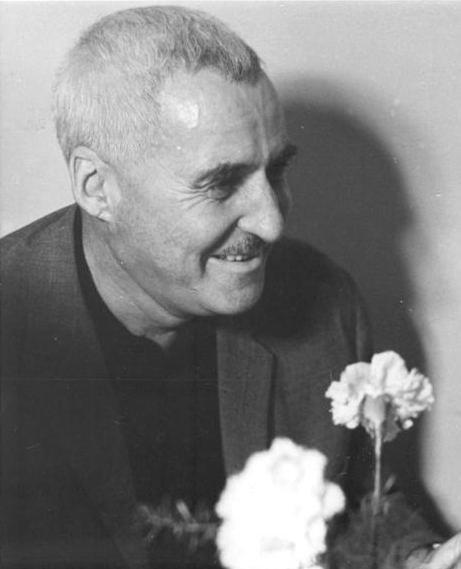
- Simonov in Berlin, 1967
- Born: Kirill Mikhailovich Simonov; 28 November [O.S. 15 November] 1915; Petrograd, Russian Empire
- Died: 28 August 1979 (aged 63); Moscow, Russian SFSR, Soviet Union
- Occupations: War poet, novelist, playwright, war correspondent
- Spouses: Natalya Ginsburg (divorced); Yevgenia Laskina (div. 1940); Valentina Serova (m. 1943; div. 1957)
- Writing career
- Notable works: "Wait for Me"; Days and Nights; The Living and the Dead

Signature
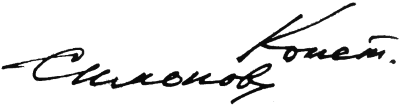

Konstantin Mikhailovich Simonov (Russian: Константин Михайлович Симонов; born Kirill Mikhailovich Simonov; (Note: Russian: Кирилл Михайлович Симонов) 28 November [O.S. 15 November] 1915 – 28 August 1979), was a Soviet author, war poet, playwright and wartime correspondent, arguably most famous for his 1941 poem "Wait for Me".

== Early years ==
Simonov was born in Petrograd in 1915. His mother, Princess Aleksandra Leonidovna Obolenskaya, came of the Rurikid Obolensky family. His father, Mikhail Agafangelovich Simonov, an officer in the Tsar's army, left Russia after the Revolution of 1917 and died in Poland sometime after 1921. Konstantin's mother, Alexandra, remained in Russia with Konstantin. In 1919 his mother married Alexander Ivanishev, a Red Army officer and veteran of World War I.

Konstantin spent several years as a child in Ryazan where his stepfather worked as an instructor at a local military school. They later moved to Saratov, where Konstantin spent the remainder of his childhood. After completing a basic seven-year education in 1930 in Saratov, he went into the factory workshop school (Fabrichno-Zavodskoe Uchilishche-FZU) to become a lathe-turner. In 1931 his family moved to Moscow. After completing his precision-engineering course, Simonov went to work in a factory, where he remained until 1935. During these years he changed his given name from Kirill to Konstantin because he spoke with rhotacism and lambdacism.

The first of Simonov's poems were published in 1936 in the journals Young Guard and October. After graduating from the Maxim Gorky Literature Institute in 1938, he entered the Moscow Institute of History, Philosophy, and Literature. His time there was interrupted when he was sent as a war correspondent to cover the Battle of Khalkhin Gol of May–September 1939 in Mongolia. He returned to the Institute in 1939.

== Works ==
Simonov's first play, The Story of One Love, was written in 1940, and performed on stage at the Memorial Lenin Komsomol Theater in Leningrad. He wrote his second play, A Fellow from Our Town, in 1941. That same year he was impressed by Soviet resistance near Mogilev, when he saw 39 German tanks destroyed in one day. He later described this episode in The Living and the Dead trilogy.

Studying war correspondence at the Lenin Military-Political Academy, Simonov attained the service rank of quartermaster of the second rank. At the beginning of World War II, he received a job with the official army newspaper Krasnaya Zvezda. He rose through the army ranks becoming a senior battalion commissar in 1942, lieutenant colonel in 1943, and a colonel after the war.

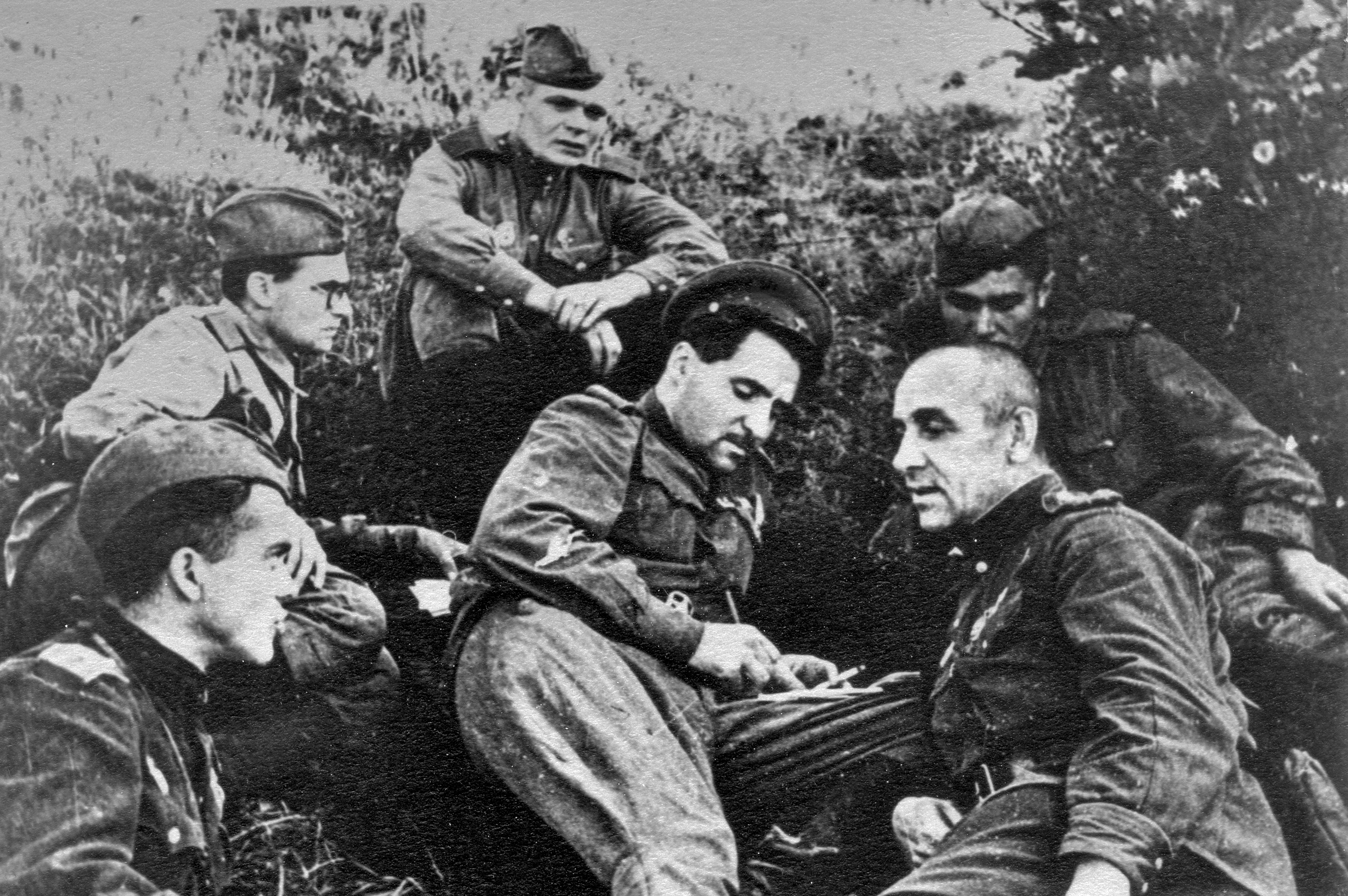
Konstantin Simonov (center) and Ilya Vlasenko (right) during Battle of Kursk, 1943

During the war years, he wrote the plays Russian People, Wait for Me, So It Will Be, the novel about Battle of Stalingrad, Days and Nights, and two books of poems, With You and Without You and War. His poem "Wait for Me", about a soldier in the war asking his beloved to wait for his return, remains one of the best-known poems in Russian literature. The poem was addressed to his future wife, the actress Valentina Serova. Many of his poems for Valentina were included in the book With You and Without You.

As a war correspondent, Simonov served in Romania, Bulgaria, Yugoslavia, Poland, and Germany, where he was present at the Battle of Berlin. After the war his collected reports appeared in Letters from Czechoslovakia, Slav Friendship, Yugoslavian Notebook and From the Black to the Barents Sea: Notes of a War Correspondent.

== Post-war works ==
For three years after the war ended, Simonov served in foreign missions in Japan, the United States and China. From 1958 to 1960 he worked in Tashkent as the Central Asian correspondent for Pravda. His novel Comrades in Arms was published in 1952, and the first part of his World War II trilogy, The Living and the Dead, was published in 1959. In 1961 his play, The Fourth, was performed at the Sovremennik Theatre. In 1963–64 he wrote the novel Soldatami ne rozhdaiutsia, which can be translated as "Soldiers Are Made, Not Born" or "One Isn't Born a Soldier." In 1970–71 he wrote a sequel The Last Summer.

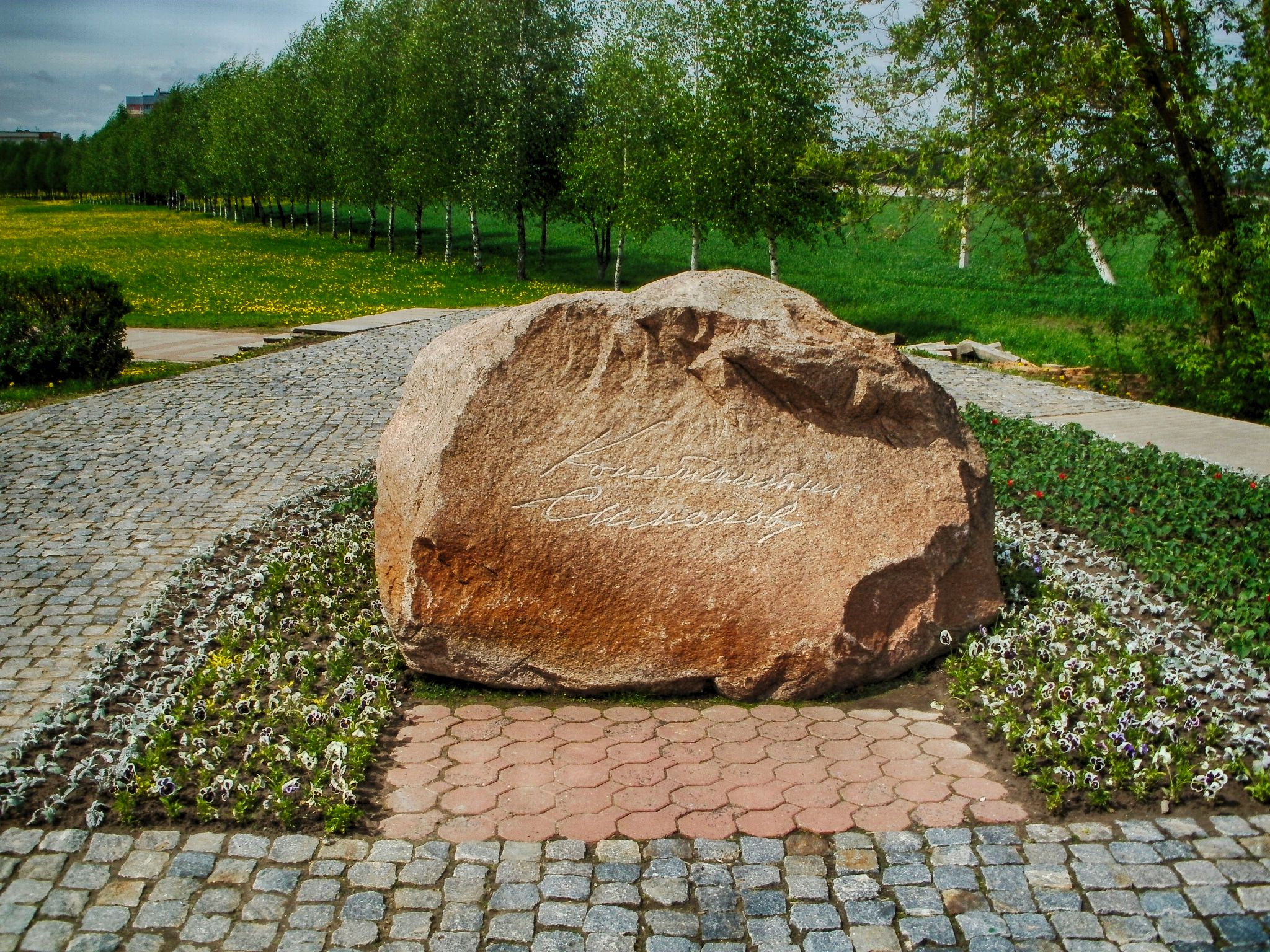
Memorial stone dedicated to the memory of Konstantin Simonov, erected on Buinichi Field, near Mogilev

For two spells, 1946–50 and 1954–58, Simonov was editor in chief of the journal Novy Mir. From 1950 through 1953, he was editor in chief of the Literary Gazette; from 1946 through 1959 and from 1967 through 1979, secretary of the Union of Writers of the USSR. In the year before his death, he tried to create a special archive of memories of soldiers in the archives of the Defense Ministry in Podolsk, Moscow Region, but leaders of the army, in the high echelons, blocked the idea.

Konstantin Simonov died of lung cancer on 28 August 1979 in Moscow. According to his last will, he was cremated, and his ashes were scattered on Buinichi Field near Mogilev.

He is the central character in Orlando Figes' book The Whisperers (2007).

== Awards and honors ==
- Hero of Socialist Labour (27 September 1974)
- Three Orders of Lenin
- Order of the Red Banner (May 1942)
- two Orders of the Patriotic War 1st class
- Order of the Badge of Honour (January 1939)
- Medal "For the Victory over Germany in the Great Patriotic War 1941–1945"
- Medal "For the Defence of Odessa"
- Medal "For the Defence of Stalingrad"
- Lenin Prize (1974)
- Stalin Prize first degree (1942, 1947, 1949)
- Stalin Prize second degree (1943, 1946, 1950)
- Order of the White Lion (Czechoslovak SSR)
- Czechoslovak War Cross 1939–1945 (Czechoslovak SSR)
- Order of Sukhbaatar (Mongolian SSR)
- Vasilyev Brothers State Prize of the RSFSR (1966)

== Film adaptations of Simonov's works ==
Numerous films were released in the Soviet Union on Simonov's scenarios and based on his works:

- Lad from Our Town (1942), directed by Aleksandr Stolper
- Wait for Me (1943), directed by Aleksandr Stolper
- In the Name of the Fatherland (1943), directed by Vsevolod Pudovkin and Dmitriy Vasilyev (play Russian People)
- Days and Nights (1945), directed by Aleksandr Stolper
- The Russian Question (1947), directed by Mikhail Romm
- The Immortal Garrison (1956)
- The Normandy – Neman (1960), joint production by the USSR and France; together with Charles Spaak and Elsa Triolet
- The Alive and the Dead (1964), directed by Aleksandr Stolper, starring Kirill Lavrov, Anatoli Papanov, Oleg Yefremov
- Grenada, Grenada, My Grenada... (1967), documentary, co-directed with Roman Karmen, on the Spanish Civil War
- Retribution (1969), directed by Aleksandr Stolper
- The Case of Polynin (1970), directed by Aleksey Sakharov
- The Fourth (1972), directed by Aleksandr Stolper
- Twenty Days Without War (1976), directed by Aleksei German, starring Yuri Nikulin and Lyudmila Gurchenko
- From Lopatin's Notes (1977), directed by Iosif Reichelgaus and Oleg Tabakov

== Translations ==
- Wait For Me: Selected poems of Konstantin Simonov. Trans. by Mike Munford. Thirsk, UK: Smokestack Books, 2020.
