= Hard Happiness =

- Russian: Трудное счастье
- Directed by: Aleksandr Stolper
- Written by: Yuri Nagibin
- Starring: Mikhail Kozakov; Viktor Avdyushko; Yevgeny Leonov; Veriko Anjaparidze
- Cinematography: Aleksandr Kharitonov
- Music by: Nikolai Kryukov
- Release date: 1958
- Running time: 104 minute
- Country: Soviet Union
- Language: Russian

Hard Happiness (Russian: Трудное счастье) is a 1958 Soviet drama film directed by Aleksandr Stolper.

== Plot ==
The film takes place during the civil war. The film tells about a gypsy named Kolya, who ended up in a Russian village, where he was forced to fight his freedom and happiness.

== Cast ==
- Mikhail Kozakov as Nikolai Nagorny
- Valery Ashurov as young Nagorny
- Viktor Avdyushko as Seryoga Gvozdenko
- Yevgeny Leonov as Agafon
- Nina Golovina as Katya Yermolina
- Veriko Anjaparidze as Nagorny's grandmother
- Antonina Gunchenko as Maria
- Nikolai Lutsenko as Lukyan
- Oleg Yefremov as ginger guy
- Nikita Kondratev as Timoshka
- Nikolay Smorchkov as Nikita
- Radner Muratov as gypsy uncle Petya
- Nikolai Sergeyev as village headman Ovsei Yermolin
- Nikolai Slichenko as gypsy from Lukyan's camp
- Ivan Ryzhov as theater guard
