= Tight Knot (disambiguation) =

Tight Knot is another name of the Soviet film Sasha Enters Life.

Tight Knot may also refer to:

- A track from the Valtari album by Icelandic post-rock band Sigur Rós
- A British-Ukrainian war-game, see 2006 anti-NATO protests in Feodosia
