= Twenty Days Without War =

- Directed by: Aleksey German
- Starring: Yuri Nikulin
- Cinematography: Valeri Fedosov
- Distributed by: Lenfilm
- Release date: January 1976
- Running time: 101 min
- Country: Soviet Union
- Language: Russian

Twenty Days Without War (Russian: Двадцать дней без войны, romanized: Dvadtsat' dney bez voyny) is a 1976 Soviet film based on a story by Konstantin Simonov, directed by Aleksey German and starring Yuri Nikulin and Lyudmila Gurchenko.

The film describes how the romantic views of war as pictured in the Soviet war film industry were actually far different from the harsh realities of front line warfare.

== Plot ==
Major Lopatin (played by Yuri Nikulin) is a military journalist during World War II, who goes back to his hometown of Tashkent (Uzbekistan) in Middle Asia at the end of 1942 to spend a 20-day leave following the Battle of Stalingrad and to see the shooting of a film based on the wartime articles he has written. There he is romantically involved with a woman named Nina (played by Lyudmila Gurchenko).

Lopatin realizes that the romanticized views of warfare on the home front are vastly different from the realities he had encountered.

== Production ==
The film was based on the novel and screenplay of Konstantin Simonov (1915-1979), a military journalist who wrote the famous poem "Wait for Me" during World War II in 1941.

The film was mostly shot in black and white, or very muted color, as looking aged to be visually closed to that wartime.

== Cast ==
- Yuri Nikulin as Major Vasily Nikolaevich Lopatin, military journalist
- Lyudmila Gurchenko as Nina
- Rashid Sadykov as Usman Yusupov, secretary of the Central Committee
- Alexei Petrenko as Yuri Stroganov, pilot Captain
- Angelina Stepanova as Zinaida Antonovna, artistic director of the theater
- Mikhail Kononov as Pasha Rubtsov, voenkor
- Yekaterina Vasilyeva as Rubtsov, widow of Pasha
- Nikolai Grinko as Vyacheslav (voiced by Innokenty Smoktunovsky)
- Lyusyena Ovchinnikova as Ksenia Sergeevna, former wife of Lopatin
- Liya Akhedzhakova as woman with clocks
- Dmitry Bessonov as Vedeneev, Ksenia's new husband
- Zoya Vinogradova as Vera, actress
- Lyudmila Zaytseva as Lidiya, actress playing a female sniper
- Vladimir Mishanin as soldier on the train
- Nikolay Mikheev as Colonel, film consultant (voiced by Igor Efimov)
- Yuri Soloviev as commander
- Vera Karpova as stepmother Nina (uncredited)
- Oleg Korchikov as the driver (uncredited)
- Arkady Trusov as guest-singer (uncredited)
