= The Law of Life (film) =

1940 film by Aleksandr Stolper

- Directed by: Aleksandr Stolper; Boris Ivanov
- Written by: Aleksandr Avdeyenko
- Starring: Daniil Sagal; Aleksandr Lukyanov; Oswald Glazunov
- Cinematography: Sergei Uralov
- Music by: Nikolai Kryukov
- Production company: Mosfilm
- Release date: 7 August 1940
- Running time: 101 minutes
- Country: Soviet Union
- Language: Russian

The Law of Life (Russian: Закон жизни) is a 1940 Soviet drama film directed by Boris Ivanov and Aleksandr Stolper and starring Daniil Sagal, Aleksandr Lukyanov and Oswald Glazunov. Despite its strong endorsement of communist ideology, the film was fiercely attacked in Pravda and withdrawn from release.

== Plot ==
Sergey Paromov requests permission from the rector, Babinov, to hold a farewell evening at the medical institute. Sergey is romantically involved with Babinov's daughter, Natasha. During the event, the secretary of the Komsomol, Ognerubov, unexpectedly appears, promoting "distorted values" to the students in the spirit of "from each according to his ability, to each according to his needs." The evening turns into a drinking party. Sergey Paromov tries unsuccessfully to appeal to the students' conscience, but they, including Natasha, are completely charmed by Ognerubov, with whom Natasha eventually leaves to watch the sunrise by the sea.

Sergey Paromov begins a fight against Ognerubov through written words. Unfortunately, few believe that his struggle is anything more than simple jealousy. However, at a decisive Komsomol meeting, Natasha's sister Nina speaks out, revealing Ognerubov's immoral behavior: he had abandoned her with a child several years earlier. This revelation turns the tide of the meeting in Sergey's favor. The film culminates in Sergei Paromov’s speech about the moral character of a Komsomol member.

In the final scene, Sergey Paromov becomes the new Komsomol secretary.

== Cast ==
- Daniil Sagal as Paramonov
- Aleksandr Lukyanov as Ognerubov
- Oswald Glazunov as Babanov
- Nina Zorskaya as Natasha Babanova
- Elena Kondrateva as Nina Babanova
- Anna Zaporozhets as Klavdiya Stepanovna
- Grigoriy Shpigel as Cheryomushkin
- Mikhail Sidorkin as Vlasych
- Ivan Lyubeznov as Nikolay Zverev
- Aleksey Alekseev as Igor Saratovskiy
- Viktor Bubnov as Ognerubov's visitor
- Natalya Gitserot as Student
- Fyodor Ivanov as Student
- Valentina Karavayeva as Student
- Nadir Malishevsky as Paromov's visitor
- Anna Pavlova as Paromov's secretary
- Aleksandr Smirnov as Student
- Boris Terentev as Ivan Danilovich

== Bibliography ==
- Rollberg, Peter. Historical Dictionary of Russian and Soviet Cinema. Scarecrow Press, 2008.
