= Tale of a True Man =

1948 film by Aleksandr Stolper

- Directed by: Aleksandr Stolper
- Written by: Boris Polevoy; Maria Smirnova
- Produced by: Nikolay Sliozberg
- Starring: Pavel Kadochnikov; Nikolay Okhlopkov; Aleksei Dikiy; Vasili Merkuryev; Tamara Makarova
- Cinematography: Mark Magidson
- Music by: Nikolai Kryukov
- Production company: Mosfilm
- Release date: 1948
- Running time: 96 minutes
- Country: Soviet Union
- Language: Russian

Tale of a True Man (Russian: Повесть о настоящем человеке) is a Soviet feature film directed by Aleksandr Stolper, based on the Russian book of the same name by Boris Polevoy.

For the participation in the film, a number of film actors and the cameraman were awarded the Stalin Prize in 1949.

== Plot ==
At the heart of the dramatic history are the real facts of the biography of the fighter pilot Alexey Maresyev.

In March 1942, during an aerial battle near the Demyansk Pocket, Soviet fighter pilot Alexei Maresyev is shot down, and his plane crashes into a dense forest. As he lies injured, a bear approaches, threatening to attack, but Maresyev calmly retrieves a pistol and shoots the animal before losing consciousness. Upon waking, he discovers his legs are severely injured. Alone in the winter wilderness, 50 kilometers from the nearest Red Army position, he resolves to reach safety. Despite immense pain, he drags himself through the snow, sometimes crawling when his legs fail. After 18 harrowing days, he is discovered by partisans, who transport him to safety.

At the hospital, doctors amputate Maresyev’s feet. Facing life as a young amputee, he struggles with despair. Sharing his hospital room is Commissar Vorobyov, a severely wounded but optimistic man who inspires his fellow patients with tales of resilience, such as the story of Nikolai Ostrovsky, who wrote How the Steel Was Tempered while paralyzed. Vorobyov’s encouragement and an article about a World War I pilot, Lieutenant Karpovich, who flew with a prosthetic foot, rekindle Maresyev’s determination. Convinced that he can return to the skies, Maresyev begins rigorous rehabilitation, devising his own grueling exercise routine to strengthen his legs. Despite excruciating pain, he persists, learning to walk and eventually run on his prosthetics.

Transferred to a sanatorium for further recovery, Maresyev not only regains mobility but also learns to dance, encouraged by a kind nurse, Zinaida. At a medical review, he impresses the doctors by energetically performing a traditional Russian dance, the "Barynya," earning their approval to return to duty. He trains at a pilot school, successfully proving his abilities during a flight with an instructor who is astonished to learn of his prosthetics. Rejoining the frontlines, Maresyev demonstrates his prowess in combat, shooting down two Focke-Wulf Fw 190 fighters flown by German aces and rescuing a younger comrade during a daring mission.

== Cast ==
- Pavel Kadochnikov as Alexey Maresyev
- Nikolay Okhlopkov as commissar Vorobiev
- Aleksei Dikiy as Vasily Vasilyevich
- Vasili Merkuryev as Stepan Ivanovich the foreman
- Tamara Makarova as Klavdia Mikhailovna
- Lyudmila Tselikovskaya as Zinochka
- Lev Sverdlin as Naumov
- Czeslaw Sushkevich as Kukushkin
- Viktor Khokhryakov as Degtyarenko
- Aleksandr Mikhailov as Petrov
- Boris Dobronravov as chairman of the commission
- Boris Babochkin as commander of the regiment
- Lyubov Sokolova as collective farmer Varvara (debut role)
- Sergei Bondarchuk as Gvozdev
- Mikhail Gluzsky as captain Cheslov
- Vladimir Gribkov as Zuyev
- Ivan Ryzhov as patient in the sanatorium

== Awards ==
Stalin Prize

- Aleksandr Stolper (director)
- Mark Magidson (cinematographer)
- Pavel Kadochnikov (actor)
- Vasili Merkuryev (actor)
- Nikolay Okhlopkov (actor)

== See also ==
- List of World War II films
