= Radner Muratov =

- Раднэр Муратов
- Born: Radner Zinyatovich Muratov; 21 October 1928; Leningrad, RSFSR, Soviet Union
- Died: 10 December 2004 (aged 76); Moscow, Russia
- Occupation: Actor
- Years active: 1952–1987

Radner Zinyatovich Muratov (Russian: Раднэр Зинятович Муратов, Tatar: Раднэр Зиннәт улы Моратов, romanized: Radner Zinnät uğlı Moratov; 21 October 1928 – 10 December 2004) was a Soviet and Russian stage and film actor of Tatar ethnicity. He appeared in more than 80 films from 1952 to 1987.

== Partial filmography ==
Film
| Year | Title | Role | Notes |
|---|---|---|---|
| 1952 | The Composer Glinka | Theater bellhop | Uncredited |
| 1953 | A Fortress in the Mountains | Akhmet | |
| 1953 | Chuk and Gek | Exploration expedition member | Uncredited |
| 1955 | Lyana | Grisha | |
| 1955 | Maksim Perepelitsa | Taskirov, Maksim's colleague | |
| 1956 | Early Joys | Akhmet, serves kumis on the fair | Uncredited |
| 1957 | Duel | Gaynan | |
| 1958 | Hard Happiness | Uncle Petya, gypsy | |
| 1959 | Ballad of a Soldier | Alyosha's companion | Uncredited |
| 1960 | The Lady with the Dog | Yalta café waiter | Uncredited |
| 1961 | Mission | Mokei | |
| 1964 | Welcome, or No Trespassing | Pioneer leader in tubeteika | Uncredited |
| 1964 | Uninvented Story | Mikhail | |
| 1964 | Father of a Soldier | Lieutenant | |
| 1964 | The Hockey Players | Restaurant visitor | Uncredited |
| 1965 | Time, Forward! | Zagirov | |
| 1966 | Aybolit-66 | Bandit | |
| 1966 | Little Fugitive | Hospital patient | Uncredited |
| 1967 | Retribution | Medical battalion first sergeant | Uncredited |
| 1968 | The Golden Calf | Zagirov, student on the train | |
| 1968 | The Shield and the Sword | "Shaman" | |
| 1970 | Mission in Kabul | Yusuf | |
| 1971 | The Twelve Chairs | Chess player | |
| 1971 | Gentlemen of Fortune | Vasily Alibaba | |
| 1973 | Incorrigible Liar | Waterer | |
| 1975 | Afonya | Marat Rakhimov | |
| 1975 | It Can't Be! | Militiaman | |
| 1975 | The Lost Expedition | Akhmetka | |
| 1976 | Golden River | Akhmetka | |
| 1979 | Little Tragedies | episode | |
| 1980 | The Evening Labyrinth | Laundry loader | |
| 1983 | Eternal Call | Magomedov | Episode 15 |
| 1985 | Legal Marriage | Militiaman in the department | |
| 1987 | The Kreutzer Sonata | Conductor | (final film role) |
