= Plotnikov =

Plotnikov (feminine: Plotnikova) is a Russian-language patronymic surname derived from nickname plotnik literally meaning the occupation of carpenter. Sometimes it may be transliterated as Plotnikoff or Plotnikow. Notable people with the surname include.

- Aleksandr Plotnikov
- Andrey Plotnikov
- Boris Plotnikov
- Igor Plotnikov
- Irina Plotnikova, Russian pianist
- Ivan Plotnikov
- Jana Plotnikova, Lithuanian acrobatic gymnast
- Klavdiya Plotnikova, Last speaker of the Kamassian language
- Marina Plotnikova
- Nikolai Plotnikov
- Pavel Plotnikov, Soviet World War II pilot, twice Hero of the Soviet Union
- Sergei Plotnikov
- Vadym Plotnikov
- Valeri Plotnikov
- Vasily Plotnikov
- Vladimir Plotnikov (politician) (born 1961), Russian politician
- Vladimir Plotnikov (footballer) (born 1986), Kazakhstani footballer
- William Plotnikov, Russian-Canadian boxer and convert to Islam
- Yelena Plotnikova (born 1978), Russian volleyball player
- Yelena Plotnikova (archer) (born 1977), Kazakhstani archer
- Yevgeni Plotnikov
