= Lenin in 1918 =

1939 film by Mikhail Romm

- Film poster
- Directed by: Mikhail Romm
- Written by: Taisiya Zlatogorova; Aleksei Kapler
- Starring: Boris Shchukin; Mikheil Gelovani; Nikolay Bogolyubov; Nikolay Cherkasov; Nikolay Okhlopkov
- Cinematography: Boris Volchek
- Music by: Nikolai Kryukov
- Production company: Mosfilm
- Release date: 1939
- Running time: 130 minutes 105 minutes (cut version)
- Country: Soviet Union
- Language: Russian

Lenin in 1918 (full film)

Lenin in 1918 (Russian: Ленин в 1918 году, Lenin v 1918 godu) is a Soviet biographical drama film released in 1939. It gives the background of the Russian Civil War after the October Revolution.

The film was directed by Mikhail Romm with E. Aron and I. Simkov as co-directors. The script was written by Aleksei Kapler together with Taisiya Zlatogorova.

== Plot ==
The film depicts events from 1918 in Moscow, at the height of the Russian Civil War, a time marked by famine and devastation. Amidst this turmoil, the Soviet government, led by Lenin and Stalin, works tirelessly within the Kremlin to guide the country out of crisis. Despite the intense pressures of governance, Lenin finds time to meet with emissaries from the people. A pivotal moment in the film is Lenin’s meeting with a wealthy peasant from Tambov.

At the same time, a conspiracy against the government begins to take shape. The plot is uncovered by Commander Matveyev, but the conspirators manage to escape and later organize an assassination attempt on Lenin. The attempt takes place during Lenin's speech at the Michelson Factory, where Fanny Kaplan fires the shot that wounds him.

Lenin endures a prolonged recovery but eventually regains his health and resumes his work, continuing to lead the nation through its challenges. The film captures this critical period in Soviet history, highlighting both the hardships of the time and the resilience of its leaders.

== Cast ==
- Boris Shchukin as Vladimir Lenin
- Mikheil Gelovani as Joseph Stalin (removed from cut version)
- Nikolay Bogolyubov as Kliment Voroshilov
- Nikolay Cherkasov as Maxim Gorky
- Vasily Markov as Felix Dzerzhinsky
- Leonid Lyubashevsky as Yakov Sverdlov
- Zoya Dobina as Nadezhda Krupskaya
- Nikolay Okhlopkov as comrade Vasily, Lenin's assistant and bodyguard
- Klavdiya Korobova as Natalya, Vasily's wife
- Vasili Vanin as Kremlin commandant Matveyev
- Yelena Muzil as Yevdokiya Ivanovna, Lenin's housekeeper
- Iosif Tolchanov as Andrei Fyodorovich, physician
- Aleksandr Khokhlov as professor
- Dmitry Orlov as Stepan Ivanovich Korobov, old St. Petersburg proletarian
- Serafim Kozminsky as Bobylyov, Lenin's assistant
- Nikolai Plotnikov as kulak from Tambov Governorate
- Nikolai Svobodin as Valerian Rutkovsky, socialist revolutionary
- Viktor Tretyakov as Ivan Grigoryevich Novikov, socialist revolutionary
- Natalya Yefron as Fanny Kaplan
- Aleksandr Shatov as Konstantinov, counter-revolutionary conspiracy organizer
- Vladimir Solovyov as Sintsov, chekist-traitor
- Sergei Antimonov as Polyakov (uncredited)
- Viktor Kulakov as Nikolai Bukharin (uncut version, uncredited)
- Rostislav Plyatt as military expert (uncut version, uncredited)
- Georgy Bogatov as Vyacheslav Molotov (uncredited)
- Anatoli Papanov as episode (uncredited)

== Production ==
The shooting started on 10 August 1938 and lasted for eighty-seven days. Shchukin never saw Lenin in real life, but he did intense research, immersing himself in everything related to him. During the production of Lenin in 1918, Boris Shchukin constantly suffered from ill health. Exactly six months after his appearance in the film and while a sequel was being developed Shchukin died.

== International audience ==
During China's Cultural Revolution, Lenin in 1918 along with Lenin in October were the only Soviet feature films repeatedly screened to the public.
