= Lyotchiki =

The Pilots
- Film poster
- Russian: Лётчики
- Directed by: Yuli Raizman; Grigori Levkoyev
- Written by: Aleksandr Macheret
- Starring: Boris Shchukin; Yevgenia Melnikova; Ivan Koval-Samborsky; Aleksandr Chistyakov; Grigori Levkoyev
- Cinematography: Leonid Kosmatov
- Music by: Nikolai Kryukov
- Production company: Moskinokombinat
- Distributed by: Mosfilm
- Release dates: 24 April 1935 (Russia); 10 May 1935 (USA)
- Running time: 80 min.
- Country: Soviet Union
- Language: Russian

Lyotchiki (Russian: Лётчики, romanized: Lyotchiki: ) (aka Men on Wings and The Pilots) is a 1935 Soviet romantic drama film directed by Yuli Raizman and Grigori Levkoyev. Maxim Gorky called him among the best Soviet filmmakers of that time.

== Plot ==
School Commander Nikolai Rogachyov (Boris Shchukin) and famous aerobatic pilot, is in charge of a civilian flying school in Russia. Pilot Sergei Belyaev (Ivan Koval-Samborsky), showing recklessness trying to emulate the test pilot Valery Chkalov), crashes the aircraft assigned to him.

Student flight school Galya Bystrova (Yevgenia Melnikova), who likes Belyaev, unfortunately, seeks to imitate him in the air. Commander Rogachyov falls for young student pilot Gayla, but their difference in age prevents him from declaring his love.

Rogachyov teaches that discipline in the air is necessary to survive as a pilot. Finally, that message begins to make sense to Sergei and Gayla.

== Cast ==
- Ivan Koval-Samborsky as Student Commander Sergei Belyaev
- Yevgenia Melnikova as Flight School Student Galya Bystrova
- Aleksandr Chistyakov as Senior Mechanic Ivan Matveyevich Khrushchev
- Boris Shchukin as Flight School Commander Nikolai Rogachyov
- Grigori Levkoyev as Doctor at airfield (uncredited)
- Inna Fyodorova as Medical attendant (uncredited)
- Zoya Fyodorova as Nurse (uncredited)
- Nikolai Khryashchikov as Appearing (uncredited)
- Maria Klyuchareva as Sanitary (uncredited)
- Ivan Kobozev as Pilot Kobozev (uncredited)

== Production ==
Principal photography for Lyotchiki took place in 1935 on the outskirts of Voronezh, on the airfield (now Holzunov Street in the Northern residential area). (Note: Lyotchiki was a "state-sponsored export" from the Soviet Union.)

== Reception ==
Under the title, The Pilots, Lyotchiki was released worldwide, while in the United States, it was re-titled Men on Wings. Aviation film historian James H, Farmer in Celluloid Wings: The Impact of Movies on Aviation (1984) described the film's "poor production values." Aviation film historian Stephen Pendo in Aviation in the Cinema (1985) had a similar opinion, noting, "unexciting flying scenes."

in the Soviet films of the time, Lyotchiki was considered a classic.
