= Dawn of Paris =

- Russian: Зори Парижа
- Directed by: Grigori Roshal
- Written by: Grigori Roshal; Georgiy Shakhovskoy
- Starring: Nikolai Plotnikov; Yelena Maksimova; Andrei Abrikosov; Viktor Stanitsyn; Dmitri Dorlyak
- Cinematography: Leonid Kosmatov
- Music by: Nikolai Kryukov
- Release date: 1936
- Country: Soviet Union
- Language: Russian

Dawn of Paris (Russian: Зори Парижа) is a 1936 Soviet drama film directed by Grigori Roshal.

The film tells about the Polish revolutionary democrat, Jarosław Dąbrowski, who led the army of the Paris Commune in 1871.

== Plot ==
On March 18, 1871, the Paris Commune is proclaimed, while the government of Adolphe Thiers retreats to Versailles. The army lays siege to Paris. Eugène Gorrot, a shoemaker from Lyon, joins the ranks of the city's defenders. On one of the city’s redoubts, he meets Catherine Millard, a brave and selfless woman who takes up arms during these dire days.

Disunity among the members of the Commune's council poses a grave threat to the besieged city. Although German forces claim neutrality, they sympathize with Thiers, allowing armed troops to approach the outskirts of Paris.

Versailles forces, through bribery, breach the city but are met with resistance at the barricades erected in Parisian streets. One of the Commune’s military leaders, General Jarosław Dąbrowski, calls on everyone capable of resisting to join the fight. Despite the attackers' overwhelming advantage, the Communards engage in a valiant battle to defend their city.

== Cast ==
- Nikolai Plotnikov as General Dombrovsky
- Yelena Maksimova as Catherine Millard (as Ye. Maksimova)
- Andrei Abrikosov as Etienne Millard
- Viktor Stanitsyn as Battalion commander Shtaiper (as V. Stanitsin)
- Dmitri Dorlyak as Eugene Gorrot
- Anatoliy Goryunov as Richet the artist (as A. Goryunov)
- Vladimir Belokurov as Prosecutor Rigot
- Vera Maretskaya as Mother Pinchot
