= Retribution (1969 film) =

- Russian: Возмездие
- Directed by: Aleksandr Stolper
- Written by: Konstantin Simonov; Aleksandr Stolper
- Starring: Kirill Lavrov; Anatoliy Papanov; Lyudmila Krylova; Aleksandr Plotnikov; Yuri Stoskov
- Cinematography: Nikolay Olonovskiy
- Edited by: A. Kamagorowa
- Release date: 1969
- Running time: 126 minute
- Country: Soviet Union
- Language: Russian

Retribution (Russian: Возмездие, romanized: Vozmezdiye) is a 1969 Soviet World War II film directed by Aleksandr Stolper. The film is based on the 1962 novel Nobody Is Born As Soldier (Солдатами не рождаются), part of Konstantin Simonov's novel trilogy The Living and the Dead.

== Plot ==
The film talks about the heroes of the Battle of Stalingrad, which are united by an incredibly strong desire for victory.

== Cast ==
- Kirill Lavrov as Ivan Sinzov
- Anatoliy Papanov as General Serpilin
- Lyudmila Krylova as Tanja Ovsyannikova
- Aleksandr Plotnikov as Kuzmich
- Yuri Stoskov as Levashov
- Yuri Vizbor as Zakharov
- Grigoriy Gay as Berezhnoy (as Grigori Gaj)
- Sergey Shakurov as Ilyin
