= Viktor Avdyushko =

Soviet actor (1925–1975)

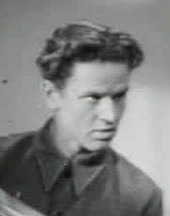
- Born: January 11, 1925; Moscow, Soviet Union
- Died: November 19, 1975 (aged 50); Moscow, Soviet Union
- Occupation: Actor
- Years active: 1948–1975
- Spouse: Liina Orlova

Viktor Antonovich Avdyushko (Russian: Виктор Антонович Авдюшко; January 11, 1925 – November 19, 1975) was a Soviet actor and a People's Artist of the Russian SFSR.

== Biography ==
=== Early life ===
Avdyushko was born to a father who worked as a weight inspector in the Kiyevsky Rail Terminal and to a housewife mother, who also raised one older daughter. Initially a student in the Moscow Aviation Institute, he left it and was admitted into the All-Union State Institute of Cinematography, where he studied under Yuli Raizman. He graduated from the academy in 1949, and joined the regular cast of the Mosfilm studio.

=== Breakthrough ===
He made his debut on screen with a minor role in Sergei Gerasimov's 1948 film The Young Guard. Avdyushko continued to play supporting characters during the following years, in pictures such as Cossacks of the Kuban and Hostile Whirlwinds. He was given his first major appearance in the 1955 Heroes of Shipka, when he depicted the Russian soldier Osnobishin.

In 1957, Avdyushko was cast for the leading role in Mikhail Schweitzer's Tight Knot, adapted from a story by Vladimir Tendryakov. He portrayed Pavel Mansurov, an idealist Kolkhoz general secretary who is corrupted by the power of his office. The film had to be heavily censured in order to be released, and its title was changed to Sasha Comes to Life. The full version was only released in 1988.

=== Summit ===
The actor starred in many films during the 1960s and early 1970s, and performed in fifty until the end of his career, including the 1961 Biennale Jury Prize winning Peace to Him Who Enters and the 1964 The Alive and the Dead, based on Konstantin Simonov's novel. He also worked with foreign studios, mainly East Germany's DEFA: He played in Konrad Wolf's 1958 Sun Seekers and in Frank Beyer's 1963 Naked among Wolves. In 1972, he appeared in The Dawns Here Are Quiet, which was nominated for the Academy Award for Best Foreign Film.

On 26 November 1965, Avdyushko was awarded the title Meritorious Artist of the Russian SFSR. On 28 March 1974, he was granted the title of a People's Artist of the RSFSR He was married to Estonian actress Liina Orlova, with whom he had one daughter, future actress Marija Avdyushko-Taska.

In early 1975, as he was working on a picture in Vladivostok during winter, Avdyushko entered the cold ocean water for a scene. He developed severe Pleural empyema, of which he died seven months later. He is buried in the Vagankovo Cemetery.

== Selected filmography ==
- The Young Guard (1948) as worker
- Cossacks of the Kuban (1950) as stableman
- V mirnye dni (1951) as Stepn Matveyev - vodolaz
- Admiral Ushakov (1953)
- Hostile Whirlwinds (1953) as Kovalyov
- Bogatyr idyot v Marto (1954) as inzhener Aleksey Kolos
- Heroes of Shipka (1955) as Osnobishin
- Urok zhizni (1955) as Vasya
- Doroga (1955) as Vasya
- Solovyov in Prolog (1956) as Fyodor - bolshevik
- Oni vstretilis v puti (1957) as Makar Semyonov
- Sasha vstupayet v zhizn (1957) as Pavel Mansurov
- Vosemnadtsatyy god (1958) as Ivan Gora
- Hard Happiness (1958) as Seryoga Gvozdenko
- Sun Seekers (1958) as Sergei Melnikow
- Khmuroe utro (1959) as Ivan Gora
- Fathers and Sons (1959) as Yevgeniy Bazarov
- Vsyo nachinayetsya s dorogi (1960) as Stepan Bokov
- Russkiy suvenir (1960) as Spikhnulin
- Chudotvornaya (1960) as Kushchin - sekretar raykoma
- V nachale veka (1961) as Prokhor Baskakov
- Peace to Him Who Enters (1961) as Ivan Yamshchikov
- Nash obshchiy drug as Prokhor Korniyets
- Gde-to est syn as Matros
- Naked among Wolves (1963) as Leonid Bogorski
- Introduction to Life (1963) as Bobrov
- The Alive and the Dead (1964) as Sergeant Shestakov
- Gorod - odna ulitsa (1964) as Demidov
- Strogaya igra (1964)
- Thirty Three (1965) as Misha
- Poka front v oborone (1965) as kapitan Shaternikov
- Gde ty teper, Maksim? (1965) as Grigorich
- An Ordinary Miracle (1965) as innkeeper
- Rabochiy posyolok (1966) as Grisha
- Puteshestvennik s bagazhom (1966) as Nikolay Chistov
- Proshchay (1967) as Matvey Podymakhin
- The Red and the White (1967) as sailor
- Zhitiye i vozneseniye Yurasya Bratchika (1967)
- V den svadby (1969) as Nikolay SAlov - brat Nyury
- Subject for a Short Story (1969) as Krestyanin
- Zasada (1969) as Pirozhenko (narrator)
- Liberation I: The Fire Bulge (1970) as Major Maksimov
- Den i vsya zhizn (1970) as Fedor
- Strange People (1970) as predsedatel kolkhoza (segment "Rokovoj vystrel")
- Pesn o Manshuk (1970) as Sukov
- Liberation III: Direction of the Main Blow (1971) as Maksimov
- Konets atamana (1971) as Nikolay Suvorov
- Serdtse Rossii (1971) as Aleksey Vedernikov
- Kogda raskhoditsya tuman (1972) as Pyotr Dyakonov
- The Dawns Here Are Quiet (1972) as assistant platoon commander
- U nas na zavode (1972) as Anikov
- Januskopf (1972) as Slatkow
- A Man at His Place (1973) as Vasiliy Serov
- Nam nekogda zhdat (1973) as Fyodor
- The Great Battle (1973) as Major Maksimov
- I na Tikhom Okeane... (1974) as Nikita Yegorovich Vershinin
- The Rider with Lightning in His Hand (1975) as Andrey Dmitrievich
- Jarosław Dąbrowski (1976) as Wladislaw Ozierow
- When September Comes (1976) as Yevgeniy Viktorovich
- Soldiers of Freedom (1977, TV Mini-Series) as Marshal Ivan Konev (final appearance)
