= Far from Moscow =

1951 film by Aleksandr Stolper

- Directed by: Aleksandr Stolper
- Written by: Vasily Azhayev (novel); Mikhail Papava
- Starring: Nikolay Okhlopkov; Lev Sverdlin; Pavel Kadochnikov
- Cinematography: Yu-Lan Chen; Aleksandr Shelenkov
- Edited by: Anna Kulganek
- Music by: Nikolai Kryukov
- Production company: Mosfilm
- Release date: 1950
- Running time: 103 minutes
- Country: Soviet Union
- Language: Russian

Far from Moscow (Russian: Далеко от Москвы) is a 1950 Soviet war drama film directed by Aleksandr Stolper and starring Nikolay Okhlopkov, Lev Sverdlin and Pavel Kadochnikov. It is based on Vasily Azhayev's 1948 novel of the same title. A major production by Mosfilm, it was awarded the Stalin Prize.

== Plot ==
A team of builders is constructing an oil pipeline in the Russian Far East during World War II. Some workers, including the young engineer Kovshov and the site manager Rogov, believe they should be fighting on the front lines instead of working thousands of kilometers away from the warzone. Conversations with the project leader Batmanov and party organizer Zalkind lead them to reconsider, helping them recognize the critical importance of their work. Witnessing the immense enthusiasm of Soviet workers, they come to understand that their construction site is also a front line in the war effort. Overcoming challenges, including resistance from specialists overly reliant on foreign expertise, and enduring the harsh conditions of the taiga winter, the team implements innovative solutions to complete the pipeline in record time. The oil from the Far East ultimately supports the needs of the front.

== Cast ==
- Nikolay Okhlopkov as Batmanov
- Lev Sverdlin as Zalkind
- Pavel Kadochnikov as Kovshov
- Valerian Kvachadze as Beridze
- Aleksandr Khanov as Topolev
- Grigori Kirillov as Grubskiy
- Tatyana Makhova as Tanya
- Ivetta Kiselyova as Zhenya
- Vladimir Vladislavskiy as Liberman
- Sergei Stolyarov as Pogov
- Mark Bernes as Umara-Magomet
- Leonid Kmit as Makhov
- Stepan Krylov as Solntsev
- Roza Makagonova as Zhenya
- Pavel Olenev as Merzlyakov
- Vladimir Solovyov as Efimov
- Viktor Bubnov as Karpov
- Sergei Gurzo as Petya Gudkin
- P. Ivanov as Genka Pankov
- Georgi Chernovolenko as Fursov
- Aleksandr Khvylya as Pisarev
- Aleksandra Panova as Batmanov's secretary
- Lyubov Sokolova as Olga Fyodorovna, doctor
- Yuri Timoshenko as Operator

== Bibliography ==
- Hopf, Ted. Reconstructing the Cold War: The Early Years, 1945-1958. Oxford University Press, 2012.
