= Days and Nights (1944 film) =

- Russian: Дни и ночи
- Directed by: Aleksandr Stolper
- Written by: Konstantin Simonov
- Produced by: Mosfilm
- Starring: Vladimir Solovyov; Daniil Sagal; Yuriy Lyubimov; Anna Lisyanskaya; Lev Sverdlin
- Cinematography: Yevgeniy Nikolayevich Andrikanis
- Music by: Nikolai Kryukov
- Release date: 1944
- Running time: 90 minute
- Language: Russian

Days and Nights, (Russian: Дни и ночи) is a 1944 Soviet World War II film directed by Aleksandr Stolper. It is based on the novel Days and Nights by Konstantin Simonov about the Battle of Stalingrad.

== Plot ==
The film begins in late summer 1942. New units of the Red Army arrive to defend the city of Stalingrad from invading Nazi German forces. Among the arrivals is Captain Saburov, who ferries across the Volga River to command a battalion. The fighting in the city is street-by-street, building-by-building. Saburov’s battalion drives the Germans out of three large apartment buildings they had captured. The film covers the ensuing days and nights of intense fighting, as Saburov and his men struggle to hold the three buildings, which are under constant German attack.

== Cast ==
- Vladimir Solovyov as Capt. Saburov (as V. Solovyov)
- Daniil Sagal as Vanin (as D. Sagal)
- Yuri Lyubimov as Lt. Maslennikov (as Yu. Lyubimov)
- Anna Lisyanskaya as Anya Klimenko (as A. Lisyanskaya)
- Lev Sverdlin as Col. Protsenko (as L. Sverdlin)
- Mikhail Derzhavin as Gen. Matveev (as M. Derzhavin)
- Viktor Klyucharev as Col. Remizov (as V. Klyucharev)
- Anatoliy Alekseev as Petya (as A. Alekseev)
- Fyodor Ivanov as Soldier (as F. Ivanov)
- Andrey Martynov as Soldier (as A. Martynov)
- Vasiliy Galaktionov as Chief of Staff (uncredited)
- Pavel Geraga as Commander of the Front (uncredited)
- Evgeniy Morgunov as Soldier (uncredited)
