= Lenin in October =

- Directed by: Mikhail Romm; Dmitri Vasilyev
- Written by: Aleksei Kapler
- Starring: Boris Shchukin; Nikolay Okhlopkov; Vasili Vanin
- Music by: Anatoly Alexandrov
- Production company: Mosfilm
- Release date: 7 November 1937
- Running time: 105 minutes
- Country: Soviet Union
- Language: Russian

Film "Lenin in October" (in Russian), 1937

Lenin in October (Russian: Ленин в Октябре, romanized: Lenin v oktyabre) is a 1937 Soviet biographical drama film directed by Mikhail Romm and Dmitri Vasilyev and starring Boris Shchukin, Nikolay Okhlopkov and Vasili Vanin. Made as a Soviet-realist propaganda work by the GOSKINO at the Mosfilm studio, it portrays the activities of Lenin at the time of the October Revolution. All Stalin scenes were expunged from the film for its reissue in 1958 as a result of de-stalinisation.

The movie was followed by Lenin in 1918, which was made two years later.

== Plot ==
The story depicts the events of the October Revolution, the second of the two revolutions of 1917, and Lenin's pivotal role in organizing the Bolshevik uprising. Tensions are high in Petrograd as unrest brews among workers. Lenin secretly arrives at the Petrograd train station and is escorted through the security cordon by his bodyguard, a worker named Vasily. He meets with Joseph Stalin, portrayed as his closest ally. Soon after, a clandestine meeting of the Bolshevik Central Committee is shown, where the uprising is meticulously planned.

The film showcases key moments in Soviet history: preparations for the revolution in Petrograd's factories and workshops, the iconic blank shot fired by the "Aurora" cruiser signalling the beginning of the attack on the Winter Palace, and the storming of the Winter Palace. The narrative emphasizes the betrayals of Lev Kamenev and Grigory Zinoviev, though these treacheries fail to derail the Bolsheviks' plans.

The film concludes with the declaration of the revolution's victory at the Second All-Russian Congress of Soviets of Workers' and Soldiers' Deputies, with Lenin proclaiming: "Comrades! The workers' and peasants' revolution, the necessity of which the Bolsheviks have always spoken of, has been accomplished!"

== Cast ==
- Boris Shchukin as Vladimir Lenin
- Nikolay Okhlopkov as Vasily, bolshevik and Lenin's bodyguard
- Vasili Vanin as Matveyev, bolshevik
- Vladimir Pokrovsky as Felix Dzerzhinsky
- Nikolai Arsky as Blinov, worker
- Yelena Shatrova as Anna Mikhailovna
- Klavdiya Korobova as Natasha, Vasily's wife
- Nikolai Svobodin as Valerian Rutkovsky, the Social Revolutionary
- Viktor Ganshin as Zhukov, the Menshevik
- Vladimir Vladislavsky as Karnaukhov
- Aleksandr Kovalevsky as Alexander Kerensky
- Nikolai Sokolov as Mikhail Rodzianko
- Nikolai Chaplygin as Kirilin
- Ivan Lagutin as Filimonov
- Semyon Goldshtab as Joseph Stalin (in the first version of movie)
- Sergei Tsenin as Pavel Malyantovich (uncredited)
- Anatoli Papanov as worker (uncredited)

== Production ==
Stalin wanted a film that showed the October Revolution and the men responsible for it, just in time for its twentieth anniversary. As soon as Alexei Kapler's scenario was approved by the highest authorities, Lenin in October was put into production on 10 August, already late in the year. The only director available was Mikhail Romm. Lenin in October was ready for release on 7 November, only three months after the shooting commenced.

== International influence ==
During China's Cultural Revolution, Lenin in October (along with Lenin in 1918) were the only Soviet feature films repeatedly screened to the public.

In 2011, Chinese performing artist Guo Degang created a xiangsheng (comedic crosstalk) titled Lenin in 1918. The xiangsheng depicts the plight of traditional opera performers who could no longer perform their repertoire during the Cultural Revolution and resort to mixing highlights from Lenin in October and Lenin in 1918 into an aria.

== Bibliography ==
- Rollberg, Peter (7 November 2008). Historical Dictionary of Russian and Soviet Cinema. Bloomsbury Publishing PLC. ISBN 978-0-8108-6268-5.
