= In the Name of the Fatherland =

- Directed by: Vsevolod Pudovkin; Dmitri Vasilyev
- Written by: Vsevolod Pudovkin; Dmitri Vasilyev; Konstantin Simonov (play)
- Starring: Nikolai Kryuchkov; Mikhail Zharov; Olga Zhizneva
- Cinematography: Era Savelyeva; Boris Volchek
- Production companies: Mosfilm; TsOKS
- Release date: 20 July 1954
- Running time: 94 minutes
- Country: Soviet Union
- Language: Russian

In the Name of the Fatherland (Russian: Во имя Родины, Vo imya Rodiny) is a 1943 Soviet World War II film directed by Vsevolod Pudovkin and Dmitri Vasilyev based on the play Russian People by Konstantin Simonov.

== Cast ==
- Nikolai Kryuchkov as captain Ivan Nikitich Safonov
- Yelena Tyapkina as Marfa Petrovna Safonova, his mother
- Mikhail Zharov as lieutenant paramedic Ivan Ivanovich Globa
- Mariya Pastukhova as Valentina Nikolayevna Anoshchenko
- Vladimir Gribkov as Nikolai Kharitonov, medicine doctor
- Olga Zhizneva as Mariya Nikolayevna Kharitonova
- Fyodor Kurikhin as Aleksandr Vasilyevich Vasin
- Pyotr Aleynikov as Ilyin
- Vsevolod Pudovkin as German general
- Boris Poslavsky as Werner, German colonel
