= Lev Sverdlin =

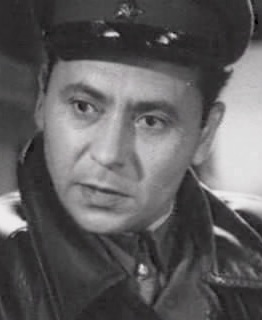
- Sverdlin in Wait for Me, 1943
- Born: Lev Naumovich Sverdlin; 16 November 1901; Astrakhan, Russian Empire
- Died: 29 August 1969 (aged 67); Moscow, Soviet Union
- Occupations: Actor, theater director and pedagogue
- Years active: 1922–1969

Lev Naumovich Sverdlin (Russian: Лев Наумович Свердлин; 16 November 1901 – 29 August 1969) was a Soviet and Russian stage and film actor, theater director and pedagogue.

== Biography ==
Lev Sverdlin was born in Astrakhan to a Jewish family. He served in the Red Army from 1919 to 1922, in the latter year he entered the Russian Institute of Theatre Arts. He began to appear in movies from 1924.

From 1938 to 1941, he worked as an actor in the Vakhtangov State Academic Theatre, then in Mayakovsky Theatre from 1943 to 1969.

He died from pancreatic cancer in Moscow at the age of 67, and was buried in the Novodevichy Cemetery.

== Filmography ==
Year	Title	Role	Notes
1936	By the Bluest of Seas	Yusuf the fisherman	
1936	Circus	Circus spectator	
1937	The Defense of Volotchayevsk	Colonel Ushijima	
1939	Minin and Pozharsky	Grigory Orlov	
1940	Gorky 3: My Universities	Tatar guard	
1942	His Name Is Sukhe-Bator	Damdin Sükhbaatar	
1943	Nasreddin in Bukhara	Nasreddin	
1943	Wait for Me	Mikhail Weinstein	
1943	The Front	Gaidar	
1943	David Bek	Russian ambassador	
1944	Days and Nights	Colonel Protsenko	
1944	The Wedding	Organ grinder	
1945	Simple People	Akbashev representative	Uncredited; released in 1956
1946	The White Fang	Matt	
1946	Cruiser 'Varyag'	Japanese consul	
1948	Tale of a True Man	Naumov	
1949	Alitet Leaves for the Hills	Alitet	
1950	Far from Moscow	Mikhail Borisovich Zalkind	Stalin Prize first degree (1951)
1954	A Tale of the Forest Giant	Vladimir Vasilyevich	
1955	The Road	Beimbetov	
1956	Different Fortunes	Nikolai Kapitonovich Ognev	
1960	It Was I Who Drew the Little Man	Supreme Liar	Voice
1963	The First Trolleybus	Svetlana's father	
1963	All Remains to People	General manager	Uncredited
1967	The Elusive Avengers	Semyon Budyonny	

== Awards and honors ==
- Order of the Red Banner of Labour (1938)
- Honored Artist of the RSFSR (1944)
- People's Artist of the RSFSR (1947)
- Two Stalin Prizes first degree (1947, 1951)
- Stalin Prize second degree (1949)
- People's Artist of the USSR (1954)
- Order of Lenin (1967)
- Medal "For the Victory over Germany in the Great Patriotic War 1941–1945"
- Medal "In Commemoration of the 800th Anniversary of Moscow"

== See also ==
- Vsevolod Meyerhold State Theatre
