= Nikolay Okhlopkov =

Soviet actor and theatre director

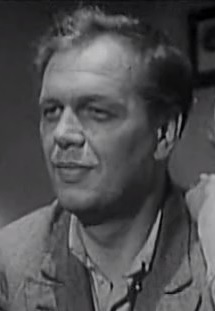
Nikolay Okhlopkov (1937)

Nikolay Pavlovich Okhlopkov (Russian: Никола́й Па́влович Охло́пков; 15 May 1900, Irkutsk – 8 January 1967, Moscow) was a Soviet and Russian stage and film actor and theatre director who patterned his work after Meyerhold. He was named a People's Artist of the USSR in 1948.

== Biography ==
Okhlopkov was born in Irkutsk, Siberia, where he began his acting career in 1918. From 1930, he directed the Realistic Theatre in Moscow, although his directing style was hardly realistic: he was the first to place spectators on the stage around the actors, in order to restore intimacy between the audience and the company. The Realistic Theatre was closed in 1938 and he moved to the Vakhtangov Theatre. In 1943 he established the Mayakovsky Theatre, which continues his traditions to this day. Okhlopkov was awarded the Stalin Prizes six times. He also directed a production of Hamlet at the Moscow Art Theatre in 1954, the first staging of this play after World War II.

== Filmography ==
- The Bay of Death (1926) as sailor
- Lenin in October (1937) as Vasily, Lenin's bodyguard
- Alexander Nevsky (1938) as Vasily Buslayev
- Lenin in 1918 (1939) as Vasily, Lenin's bodyguard
- Yakov Sverdlov (1940) as Feodor Chaliapin
- Kutuzov (1943) as General of the Infantry Michael Andreas Barclay de Tolly
- Light over Russia (1947) as Anton Ivanovich Zabelin, engineer
- Tale of a True Man (1948) as commissar Vorobyov
- Far from Moscow (1950) as Vasily Maksimovich Batmanov
- The Lights of Baku (1950) as Fyodor Yakovlevich Shatrov

== Awards ==
- Stalin Prize first degree (1941, 1947, 1951)
- Stalin Prize second degree (1949 – twice, 1951)

== See also ==
- Vsevolod Meyerhold State Theatre
