= Your Contemporary =

- Russian poster
- Russian: Твой современник
- Directed by: Yuli Raizman
- Written by: Yevgeny Gabrilovich; Yuli Raizman
- Starring: Igor Vladimirov; Nikolai Plotnikov; Antonina Maksimova; Nina Gulyaeva; Tatyana Nadezhdina
- Cinematography: Naum Ardashnikov
- Edited by: Klavdiya Moskvina
- Production company: Mosfilm
- Release date: 1967
- Running time: 140 minutes
- Country: Soviet Union
- Language: Russian

Your Contemporary (Russian: Твой современник, romanized: Tvoy sovremennik) is a 1967 Soviet drama film directed by Yuli Raizman.

It is a continuation of The Communist film.

== Plot ==
Vasily Gubanov, the son of the protagonist from the film The Communist, serves as the director of a massive industrial complex under construction in the Siberian city of Berezovka. The facility is designed to extract "koetan" (a likely reference to synthesis gas) from coal. Previously, Gubanov had championed this method and convinced authorities to begin building the enormous plant. However, he now travels to Moscow with scientist Maxim Nitochkin to advocate for halting the project. Gubanov has come to believe that extracting koetan from coal is outdated and that the transition to a more modern oil-based extraction method is necessary. This change, however, would mean abandoning the colossal construction project, into which tens of millions of rubles have already been invested. Beyond financial concerns, ethical dilemmas arise—thousands of workers have been recruited, and a new city has grown around the project. Declaring the initiative unviable would disrupt countless lives and effectively end Gubanov's career. Nonetheless, as a committed communist, Gubanov feels he cannot continue to push forward with an obsolete project he once fervently supported.

A secondary storyline unfolds alongside this conflict. Gubanov's son, Misha, falls in love with an older woman who has a child. To support his new family, he decides to leave his university studies, a decision that challenges his father's expectations. Gubanov must come to terms with and ultimately accept his son's choice, despite its divergence from his own values and aspirations.

The plot is based on real events surrounding the construction of the Angarsk Petrochemical Complex (referred to at the time as "Plant 16"), reflecting the ethical, personal, and professional challenges tied to large-scale industrial projects in Soviet history.

== Cast ==
- Igor Vladimirov as Vassili Gubanov
- Nikolai Plotnikov as Professor Nitochkyn
- Antonina Maksimova as Yelisaveta Kondratyeva
- Nina Gulyaeva as Soyka
- Tatyana Nadezhdina as Katya
- Lyudmila Maksakova
- Nikolay Kuzmin as Samokhin

== Awards ==
- Film Festival in Leningrad in 1968: First Prize for director Yuli Raizman, Best Actor award for Nikolai Plotnikov, and Best Art Design award for artist G. Turylev.
- Karlovy Vary International Film Festival in 1968: Jury Prize from international acting organizations for the film and actor Nikolai Plotnikov, and a diploma for actress Nina Gulyaeva.
- International Film Festival in Łagów in 1969: "Warsaw Siren" Prize from the critics' club jury.

== Literature ==
Warszawski, Ya. "No Word Against Conscience." Iskusstvo Kino, no. 1, 1968, pp. 9–17.
