= A Man at His Place =

- Russian poster
- Russian: Человек на своем месте
- Directed by: Aleksey Sakharov
- Written by: Valentin Chernykh
- Starring: Vladimir Menshov; Anastasiya Vertinskaya; Armen Dzhigarkhanyan; Lev Durov; Viktor Avdyushko
- Cinematography: Misha Suslov
- Edited by: Antonina Zimina
- Music by: Yuri Levitin
- Production company: Mosfilm
- Release date: 1972
- Running time: 85 minutes
- Country: Soviet Union
- Language: Russian

A Man at His Place (Russian: Человек на своем месте, romanized: Chelovek na svoyom meste) is a 1972 Soviet drama film directed by Aleksey Sakharov.

Semyon Bobrov goes to work at the plant and works there for three years, after which he returns to his native village, where he offers his candidacy for the post of chairman of the collective farm.

== Plot ==
Semyon Bobrov, after finishing his studies, is assigned to work in Leningrad. Following three years at a factory, he returns to his hometown village, where he becomes the chief engineer of a collective farm and quickly proves his capabilities. Unexpectedly, he then nominates himself for the role of chairman. Once appointed, he sets out to reshape the established, quiet routines of village life. His first challenge is to instill discipline, a task made more difficult among people who have known him since childhood. He also eliminates formalities, focusing everyone on independent, productive work.

Bobrov’s primary ambition is to construct a large, modern livestock complex, but this requires a suitable road to be built first. With limited funds from the district, he can afford either the road or the complex, but not both. Using strong negotiation skills, he secures an agreement with Kocharian, the director of a nearby chemical plant, to build a seven-kilometer stretch of highway. Since professional design bureaus are overloaded with work, Bobrov enlists senior students from an architectural institute, inspiring them to design the complex, housing, and infrastructure. Not everyone supports Bobrov’s bold direction, and some members of the farm board voice opposition. At a general assembly, Bobrov requests a vote of confidence, leading to spirited debate that ultimately ends in a decisive victory for those in favor of change.

== Cast ==
- Vladimir Menshov as Semyon Bobrov
- Anastasiya Vertinskaya as Klara Veresova
- Armen Dzhigarkhanyan as Kocharyan
- Lev Durov as Gorbachev
- Viktor Avdyushko as Serov
- Nina Menshikova as Zvygina
- Georgi Burkov as Gavriil Bobrov
- Konstantin Zabelin as Seleznyov
- Viktor Shulgin as Stukalin
- Fyodor Odinokov as uncle Grisha
