= Boris Shchukin =

Soviet actor (1894–1939)

- Борис Щукин
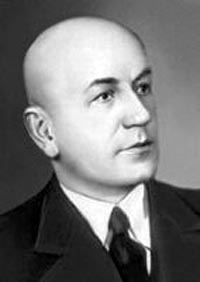
- Born: Boris Vasilyevich Shchukin; 17 April [O.S. 5 April] 1894; Moscow, Russian Empire
- Died: 7 October 1939 (aged 45); Moscow, Russian SFSR, Soviet Union
- Resting place: Novodevichy Cemetery
- Occupations: Actor, theater director, pedagogue
- Years active: 1920–1939
- Awards: People's Artist of the USSR; Stalin Prize

Boris Vasilyevich Shchukin (Russian: Бори́с Васи́льевич Щу́кин; 17 April [O.S. 5 April] 1894 — 7 October 1939) was a Russian and Soviet actor, theater director and pedagogue. In 1936, Shchukin was among the first group of recipients of the honorary title of People's Artist of the USSR. In 1941, he was posthumously awarded the Stalin Prize. He was most famous for his portrayals of Vladimir Lenin.

On October 7, 1939, Shchukin died of cardiovascular disease in Moscow.

== Filmography ==
- Lyotchiki (1935) as Nikolai Rogachyov, commander of aviation school
- Generation of Winners (1936) as Aleksandr Mikhailov
- Lenin in October (1937) as Vladimir Lenin
- Lenin in 1918 (1939) as Vladimir Lenin
