= Vasily Azhayev =

Soviet and Russian writer

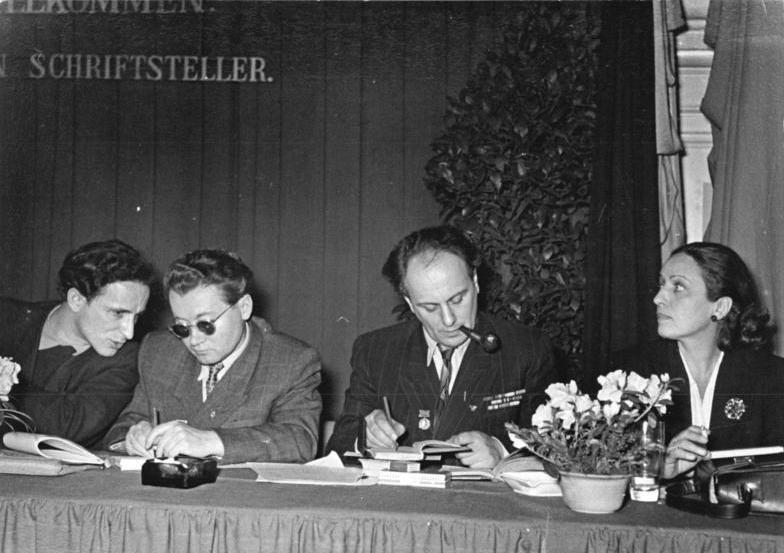
Vasily Azhayev (in sunglasses) with Paul Wiens (left), Yevgeniy Dolmatovsky (right), and Grete Weiskopf, 1954

Vasily Nikolayevich Azhayev (Russian: Васи́лий Никола́евич Ажа́ев; born 12 February [O.S. 30 January] 1915 – April 27, 1968) was a Soviet and Russian writer. He is best known as the author of the novel Daleko ot Moskvy ("Далеко от Москвы"; Far from Moscow), which was published in 1948. The novel was awarded the Stalin Prize of first degree in 1949. It later served as the basis for several eponymous film, stage and TV adaptations, and an opera.

Prior to this, he was repressed during the Great Purge (1935—1937), and was sent to the Far East. After his release, he graduated from the Maxim Gorky Literary Institute by correspondence in 1944. He later wrote an autobiographical novel entitled "The Wagon", which was published after his death in 1988, about his experiences as a political prisoner during the repressions.
