= A Declaration of Love =

- Russian: Объяснение в любви
- Directed by: Ilya Averbakh
- Written by: Pavel Finn; Yevgeny Gabrilovich
- Produced by: Yuri Gubanov; Alexander Pikunov
- Starring: Ewa Szykulska; Yuri Bogatyryov; Kirill Lavrov; Angelina Stepanova; Bruno Frejndlikh
- Cinematography: Dmitry Dolinin
- Edited by: Ye. Sadovskaya
- Production company: Lenfilm
- Release date: 1977
- Running time: 135 min.
- Country: Soviet Union
- Language: Russian

A Declaration of Love (Russian: Объяснение в любви, romanized: Obyasneniye v lyubvi) is a 1977 Soviet romance film directed by Ilya Averbakh.

== Plot ==
The main character is a talented, but timid writer Filippok who, together with his country, is going through the difficult years of revolution, devastation and war. Adversity helps him to overcome the unrequited and devoted love for the widow of the commissar Zinochka, who manages his career in a businesslike manner, not hesitating to start romances with other men. Filippok will describe his life story in a book, which at the end of days will be presented to a terminally ill, but still beloved wife with gratitude for the experience.

== Cast ==
- Ewa Szykulska as Zinochka
- Yuri Bogatyryov as Filippok
- Kirill Lavrov as Gladishev
- Angelina Stepanova as Zinochka in old age
- Bruno Frejndlikh as Filippok in old age
- Anatoli Kovalenko as investigator
- Yuri Goncharov as sailor
- Nikolai Ferapontov as blue-eyed man
- Svetlana Kryuchkova as bride
- Ivan Bortnik as Kroykov
- Lyudmila Arinina as Serafima Petrovna
- Igor Dmitriev as passenger on the ship
