= Sasha Enters Life =

1956 film

- Russian: Саша входит в жизнь
- Directed by: Mikhail Schweitzer
- Written by: Vladimir Tendryakov
- Starring: Oleg Tabakov; Viktor Avdyushko; Nikolai Sergeyev; Ivan Pereverzev; Vladimir Yemelyanov
- Music by: Veniamin Basner
- Production company: Mosfilm
- Release date: 1957
- Running time: 97 min.
- Country: Soviet Union
- Language: Russian

Sasha Enters Life (Russian: Саша входит в жизнь) is a 1957 remake of the 1956 film Tight Knot, a Soviet drama film directed by Mikhail Schweitzer. In 1988 the original film was restored under the original name, Tight Knot.

The film tells how a young man, Sasha, challenges the ruthless ambitions of a district party leader, whose manipulative tactics disrupt the lives of a farming community and entangle Sasha in a conflict that tests his values and personal relationships.

== Plot ==
After the death of the district party committee's senior secretary, the energetic Pavel Mansurov (played by Viktor Avdyushko) assumes leadership of the district. Initially, the heads of the region's large collective farms welcome his efforts. However, they soon realize that Mansurov is more focused on advancing his own career than addressing the farms' needs.

Conflicts escalate as Mansurov sets unrealistic production quotas, which the collective farms cannot meet due to insufficient infrastructure. A veteran leader commits suicide following a harsh exchange with Mansurov, and in an effort to undermine another chairman, Mansurov orchestrates a damning newspaper article. Among his critics is Sasha Komelev (played by Oleg Tabakov), the son of the district's former secretary.

A secondary plot centers on a love triangle. Sasha courts Katya Zelentsova, a member of a youth brigade, and their relationship seems headed for marriage. However, Katya abruptly ends their engagement, confessing her love for Mansurov. Despite the villagers' negative opinion of him, she views Mansurov as a misunderstood, lonely figure. In the film’s conclusion, Katya overhears Mansurov scheming during a party meeting and, devastated, cannot hold back her tears.

== Cast ==
- Oleg Tabakov as Sasha Komelev
- Viktor Avdyushko as Pavel Mansurov
- Nikolai Sergeyev as Ignat Gmyzin
- Ivan Pereverzev as Party Leader
- Vladimir Yemelyanov as Party Leader
- Pavel Volkov as Murgin, collective farm chairman
- Valentina Pugachyova as Katya Zelentsova
- Valentina Berezutskaya as Nastya Baklushina
- Antonina Bogdanova as wife Gmyzina
- Yuriy Medvedev as Meshkov
- Svetlana Konovalova as Anna Mansurova
- Yelena Maksimova as Sasha's mother
- Maya Bulgakova
- Oleg Yefremov
- Valentina Vladimirova as Pozdnyakova

== Reviews ==
- Andrei Plakhov: Another landmark work on the ideological shelf should be considered the Tight Knot by Mikhail Schweitzer, where the criticism of the collective-farm order was clearly too acute for the Khrushchev Thaw to begin with. The film was savagely rewired and released under the idiotic title Sasha Enters Life, which forever discouraged Schweitzer from making a keen social film, and he devoted himself to screen versions of the classics.
- Maya Turovskaya: Tabakov with a good and authentic artlessness conveyed the first desperate grief and uncontrollable immediate joy of his seventeen years, his infantile maturity, touching disturbances of the first failed love and breaking boyish principles, all watercolor and tender play of a barely feminine, shy and direct character. But the actor in it has not yet groped his theme.
