= Angelina Stepanova =

Soviet actress (1905–2000)

- Born: 23 November 1905; Nikolayevsk, Primorskaya Oblast, Russian Empire
- Died: 17 May 2000 (aged 94); Moscow, Russia
- Resting place: Novodevichy Cemetery, Moscow
- Occupation: actress
- Years active: 1924—1988
- Title: People's Artist of the USSR (1960)
- Spouse: Alexander Fadeyev
- Awards: USSR State Prize (1977)

Angelina Iosifovna Stepanova (Russian: Ангели́на Ио́сифовна Степа́нова, IPA: [ɐnɡʲɪˈlʲinə ɪˈosʲɪfəvnə sʲtʲɪˈpanəvə]; 23 November 1905 – 17 May 2000) was a Soviet and Russian stage and film actress, teacher. She was winner of the Stalin Prize of I class (1952) and USSR State Prize (1977). People's Artist of the USSR (1960).

== Biography ==
Stepanova was born on 23 November 1905 in Nikolayevsk (now Nikolayevsk-on-Amur, Khabarovsk Krai) in the family of an insurance agent and a dentist. Studying in a Moscow gymnasium, she was fond of ballet. Since 1921 she studied at the theater school at the Vakhtangov Theatre, which she graduated in 1924, from the same year she worked at the Moscow Art Theatre. She later became a professor at the Moscow Art Theatre School.

Stepanova started her film career in 1932.

== Death ==
She died on 17 May 2000 and was buried at the Novodevichy Cemetery.

== Selected filmography ==
- The House of the Dead (1932) as female student
- The Unforgettable Year 1919 (1951) as Olga Butkevich
- Goodbye, Boys (1964) as Nadezhda Belova, Volodya's mother
- War and Peace (1965–1967) as Anna Pavlovna Scherer
- Day by Day (1972) as Sokolova
- The Flight of Mr. McKinley (1975) as Mrs. Ann Shamway
- They Fought for Their Country (1975) as old cossack woman
- Twenty Days Without War (1976) as Zinaida Antonovna
- A Declaration of Love (1977) as Zinochka in old age
