= Over Tissa =

- Directed by: Dmitri Vasilyev
- Written by: Alexander Avdeenko
- Starring: Valentin Zubkov; Athanasius Kochetkov; Tatyana Konyukhova; Nina Nikitina; Andrey Yanovich Goncharov
- Cinematography: Nikolai Bolshakov
- Edited by: P. Chechyotkina
- Music by: Lev Shvarts
- Production company: Mosfilm
- Release date: 1958
- Running time: 79 minutes
- Country: Soviet Union
- Language: Russian

Over Tissa (Russian: Над Тиссой, romanized: Nad Tissoy) is a 1958 Soviet spy thriller film directed by Dmitri Vasilyev and based on the eponymous book by Alexander Avdeenko. The picture was the box-office leader of the year 1958 in the USSR, it was seen by 45 million viewers.

== Plot ==
The film takes place in the year 1952. A young demobilized sergeant from Berlin is en route, war hero Ivan Belogray. Fellow traveler, head of the timber rafting bureau Dzyuba finds out from Belogray that his parents died in the war and that after the war he corresponded with a girl from Transcarpathia, Theresa Simak, and decided to demobilize and go to this girl to later marry her. The travelers exit at a station and board a truck. On the way Belogray asks the driver to stop at the monument to Soviet soldiers who died during the liberation of Transcarpathia. Driver Skiban sneaks up on Belogray from behind and inflicts a mortal blow. Taking off Belogray's military uniform, picking up his documents and covering up the body with stones, the criminal hides.

A little later the enemy agent illegally penetrates the territory of USSR with the task to blow up the railway bridge across the river Tisza (in the film - Tissa), close to the village where Ivan was going. The saboteur impersonates himself as Belogray and stays at Theresa's. Border guards detain the offender who transported the false Belogray through the border, but the detainee dies, as the saboteur had fed him poisoned brandy. "Belogray" comes into contact with the local resident Dzyuba and passes Skiban a camera disguised as a cigarette case with orders to take pictures of the approaches to the bridge. When doing this he is noticed by the foreman frontier Andrei Smolyarchuk who shares his suspicions with the captain. By chance the foreman meets with Skiban, asks him for a cigarette and in a supposed accident drops his cigarette case down the slope. However the inspection of the cigarette case does not prove successful. Skiban manages to convey the hidden camera-cigarette to the saboteur. However Skiban falls under suspicion, since it was his car which came back late in the evening, when the broadcast of the saboteur was detected. Dzyuba decides to get rid of Skiban, but the driver himself kills the resident although he does not have time to get away from the guards.

Hopelessly in love with Theresa, Andrei talks to "Belogray" and begins to suspect that he does not love her and is not who he claims to be. He tells about his suspicions to the captain, the general decides to arrest the false Belogray. Teresa's mother receives a letter from Berlin with a newspaper containing an article about Belogray and sees photos in the newspaper depicting a completely different person. Theresa goes to the frontier, but her mother does not manage to hide from returned "Belogray" what happened - he wounds the future mother-in-law and goes into hiding. Border guards detain the saboteur, the locals find the real Belogray's body at the pass and bury him near fallen comrades. Smolyarchuk decides to stay to re-enlist.

== Cast ==
- Valentin Zubkov – "Ivan Belogray", aka Clark, enemy saboteur
- Athanasius Kochetkov – Andrei Ivanovich Smolyarchuk, foreman of the border troops
- Tatyana Konyukhova – Theresa Simak
- Nina Nikitina – Maria Vasilyevna Simak, Theresa's mother
- Andrey Yanovich Goncharov – Shaposhnikov, captain of the border troops
- Alexander Khvylya – Gromada, general of the border guards
- Dmitry Dubov – Zubavin, Major of the border guards
- Leonid Chubarov – Voloshenko, border guard
- Victor Solomatin – Stepanov, border guard
- Vladimir Gusev – the real Ivan Fedorovich Belogray
- Stepan Kayukov – Stefan Dzyuba Yanovich, enemy resident
- Nikolai Kryuchkov – Mikhail Skiban, driver of the timber industry, the saboteur
- Konstantin Starostin – Grab, saboteur

== Production ==
Vladimir Vysotsky tried out for the film "Over Tissa" but he failed to get a part in the picture, it was his first film audition.
