= The White Fang =

- Russian: Белый Клык
- Directed by: Aleksandr Zguridi
- Written by: Jack London (novel); Aleksandr Zguridi
- Starring: Oleg Zhakov; Yelena Izmailova; Lev Sverdlin; Nikolai Plotnikov; Osip Abdulov
- Cinematography: Viktor Asmus; Gleb Troyanski; Boris Volchek
- Music by: Viktor Oranskiy
- Release date: 1946
- Country: Soviet Union

The White Fang (Russian: Белый Клык) is a 1946 Soviet children's adventure film directed by Aleksandr Zguridi.

The film is based on the eponymous novel by Jack London. The film tells about a wolf named White Fang, who, as a result of the death of his mother, was an orphan, and a young man named Jack who goes to the Klondike and meets a wolf on the way.

== Plot ==
The story is told by mining engineer Weedon Scott as he recounts his experiences in Alaska to his wife, Alice. During a sled dog journey across the snowy Yukon wilderness, Scott narrowly escapes death when a pack of wolves attacks. White Fang is born to a wild wolf and a feral sled dog that leads the pack. As a pup, he begins to explore and learn about the world under the protection of his parents, who defend their den from predators such as a lynx. However, a storm and flood devastate the family, leaving White Fang as the sole survivor. After wandering through the forest and river, he is discovered and taken in by a Native American boy.

In the Native village, White Fang is tamed and given his name. Eventually, he ends up in a gold prospectors' settlement under the cruel ownership of Beauty Smith, who trains him as a fighting dog through brutal beatings. White Fang faces a formidable opponent, a bulldog, in a vicious and evenly matched fight. When the bulldog gains the upper hand and is about to kill White Fang, Weedon Scott intervenes, saving the wolf-dog and buying him from his abusive owner.

Weedon nurses the injured White Fang back to health. Initially distrustful, White Fang gradually warms to Scott through his patience and kindness, and a deep bond forms between them. One night, Beauty Smith tries to steal White Fang, but the dog defends himself, and Scott and his assistant capture the thief.

As time passes, Scott prepares to return to California. Though he plans to leave White Fang behind, the wolf-dog senses this and becomes despondent. In the story's emotional conclusion, White Fang escapes and reunites with Scott just in time, boarding the steamboat bound for California with his beloved master.

== Cast ==
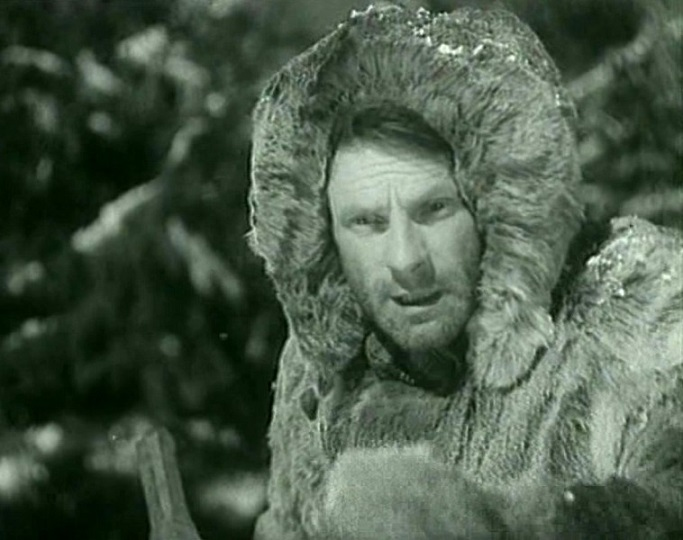
Oleg Žakov in The white Fang

- Oleg Zhakov as Weedon Scott
- Yelena Izmailova as Alisa, his wife
- Lev Sverdlin as Matt
- Nikolai Plotnikov as Handsome Smith, the bar owner (as P. Plotnikov)
- Osip Abdulov as Tim Keenan, the owner of the bulldog
- Ivan Bobrov as Gold prospector (as I. Bobrov)
- Emmanuil Geller as Gold prospector
- Viktor Latyshevskiy as Gold prospector (as V. Latyshevsky)
- Pyotr Repnin as Gold prospector
