= A Tale of the Forest Giant =

- Russian: Повесть о лесном великане
- Directed by: Alexander Zguridi
- Written by: Dmitry Eryomin; Alexander Zguridi
- Starring: Oleg Zhakov; Lyudmila Skopina; Lev Sverdlin
- Cinematography: Nina Yurushkina
- Edited by: N. Dzugutova; Ye. Shkultina
- Music by: Yuri Levitin
- Production company: Mosnauchfilm
- Release date: 1954
- Running time: 79 min.
- Country: Soviet Union
- Language: Russian

A Tale of the Forest Giant (Russian: Повесть о лесном великане, romanized: Povest o lesnom velikane) is a 1954 Soviet children's drama film directed by Alexander Zguridi.

== Plot ==
A group of children found a little moose and began to help him. Suddenly, one poacher kills the leader of a herd of moose, and then the main character, as a result, becomes the leader.

== Cast ==
- Oleg Zhakov as Nikandr Petrovich Dudin
- Lyudmila Skopina as Varvara Mikhailovna Dudina
- Lev Sverdlin as Vladimir Vasilyevich
- Vladimir Dorofeyev as Uncle Yasha
- Vera Kondakova as Nadya
- Viktor Kulakov as Nazarka
- Ivan Kuznetsov as Ostap Andreyevich
- Sergey Morskoy as Valentin Nikolaevich Kruglov
- Gena Rumyantsev as Egorushka
- Maria Yarotskaya as Granny

== See also ==
- In the World of Animals
