= Kirill Lavrov =

Soviet and Russian stage and film actor and director

- Кирилл Лавров
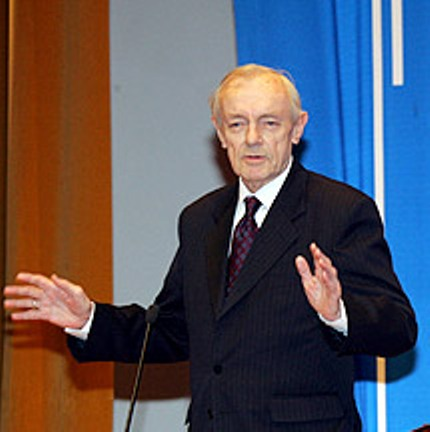
- Lavrov in 2005
- Born: Kirill Yuryevich Lavrov; 15 September 1925; Leningrad, RSFSR, Soviet Union
- Died: 27 April 2007 (aged 81); Saint Petersburg, Russia
- Years active: 1950–2007
- Awards: Lenin Prize; USSR State Prize; Hero of Socialist Labour; Order of Lenin; People's Artist of the USSR; People's Artist of Ukraine (2003)

Kirill Yuryevich Lavrov (Russian: Кирилл Юрьевич Лавров; 15 September 1925 – 27 April 2007) was a Soviet and Russian stage and film actor and director. He was honoured with the following titles; People's Artist of the USSR (1972), Hero of Socialist Labour (1985), Order of Lenin (1985) and People's Artist of Ukraine (2003).

== Biography ==
=== Childhood ===
Kirill Yuryevich Lavrov was born in Leningrad (now Saint Petersburg). He was baptised by the Russian Orthodox Church of St. John the Divine in Lavrushinskoe Podvorie Monastery in Leningrad. Young Kirill Lavrov was brought up in Leningrad, in a multi-ethnic Ukrainian and Russian family with deep roots in St. Petersburg society. His grandfather, Sergey Vassilevich Lavrov (1873—1944) was Dean of College at Russian Humanitarian Society and later was a notable figure among White émigré. His father, Yury Lavrov, was a popular Russian and Ukrainian stage and film actor designated People's Artist of Ukraine in 1948. Young Kirill Yuryevich Lavrov was fond of literature and theater from an early age, and was exposed to a highly stimulating intellectual environment in his family. He was also a good sportsman: he took gymnastics, fencing, skiing, and was a member of the youth football (soccer) team at "Spartak" sports club in Leningrad.

=== War ===
During World War II he was evacuated from besieged Leningrad to Kirov, then to Novosibirsk in Siberia. There he worked as a metal worker at a military-industrial plant. In the beginning of 1943, then 17-year-old Lavrov applied to join the Red Army to fight the Nazis. He was sent for training to Astrakhan at Technical School of Aviation, from which he graduated in 1945. Then he served as an aircraft technician in the Air Force, he was stationed at an Air Force Base on the Kuril Island of Iturup until 1950. There he was also involved in acting with an amateur troupe at a local army club. In 1950 he was discharged from the Red Army.

=== Stage career ===
In 1950, after being discharged from the Red Army, Kirill Lavrov went to Moscow and tried to enter the acting school at Moscow Art Theatre, but he was refused due to incomplete High school education which he could not have because of his military service during the war. Now disappointed and still single at age 25, Kirill Lavrov went to Ukraine and reunited with his parents in Kyiv. There he joined the troupe at Kyiv Lesya Ukrainka National Academic Theater as understudy actor and soon made appearances in classic and contemporary plays. After five years at Kyiv theatre, Kirill Lavrov was invited to become permanent member of the troupe at Leningradsky Bolshoi Drama Theater and moved to Saint Petersburg.

=== Film career ===
In 1955, Kirill Lavrov made his film debut at Lenfilm studios in Vasyok Trubachyov and His Comrades, directed by Ilya Frez. In 1964, Lavrov shot to fame with his leading role as Sintsov in The Alive and the Dead, a war drama by director Aleksandr Stolper. Kirill Lavrov received international acclaim for the leading role as Ivan Karamazov in an Oscar-nominated film The Brothers Karamazov (1969), which he also directed together with his co-star, Mikhail Ulyanov, after the death of the original film director Ivan Pyryev. Among Lavrov's other achievements were his roles in such films as Tchaikovsky (1969), Taming of the Fire (1972), and Trust (1976).

== Personal life ==
Kirill Lavrov was married to a fellow actress Valentina Nikolaeva and the couple had two children; their son, Sergei Lavrov, is a businessman, and daughter Maria Lavrova, is a film and stage actress and a permanent member of the troupe at Bolshoi Drama Theater in Saint Petersburg.

== Filmography ==
=== Actor ===
- 1955: Vasyok Trubachyov and His Comrades
- 1956: Maksim Perepelitsa as Army Photojournalist (uncredited)
- 1964: The Alive and the Dead (Russian: Живые и мертвые) as Ivan Sintsov
- 1966: A Long Happy Life as Victor
- 1969: The Brothers Karamazov as Ivan
- 1970: Tchaikovsky as Władysław Pachulski
- 1970: Lyubov Yarovaya (Russian: Любовь Яровая) as Fyodor Shvandya
- 1972: Taming of the Fire as Andrei Bashkirtsev
- 1976: Story of a Human Heart as Oleg Somov
- 1976: Trust (Russian: Доверие) as Vladimir Lenin
- 1977: A Declaration of Love (Russian: Объяснение в любви) as Gladishev
- 1978: A Hunting Accident as Count Karneyev
- 1978: A Declaration of Love as Gladishev
- 1979: Yaroslavna, the Queen of France as Yaroslav the Wise
- 1979: A Glass of Water (TV Movie) as Henry St. John, Viscount Bolingbroke
- 1980: Journey to Another City as Sergey Kirillov
- 1981: 20 December as Vladimir Lenin
- 1983: Magistral (Russian: Магистраль) as Urzhumov
- 1983: From the Life of a Chief of the Criminal Police as Col. Malych Ivan Konstantinovich
- 1984: Charlotte's Necklace as Seryogin
- 1986: Red Arrow as CEO Valeri Petrovich Kropotov
- 1988: Bread is a Рroper Noun as Communist Shabatin
- 1997: Schizophrenia as Kolobov
- 2000: Tender Age as Grandfather
- 2000: Bandit Petersburg (TV Series) as Mikheev
- 2005: The Master and Margarita (TV Mini-Series) as Pontius Pilate
- 2009: Attack on Leningrad as Radio host (final film role)

== Stage works ==
- Ocean
- Uncle Vanya
- The Three Sisters
- Boris Godunov
- And Quiet Flows The Don
- Before Sunset
- The Quartet

== Honours and awards ==
- Order "For Merit to the Fatherland";
  - 2nd class (2 September 2005) for outstanding contribution to the development of theatrical art, and many years of creative activity
  - 3rd class (13 September 2000) for his great personal contribution to the development of theatrical art
  - 4th class (5 August 1995) for services to the state and many years of fruitful work in the arts and culture
- Hero of Socialist Labour (1985)
- Order of Lenin (1985)
- Order of the October Revolution (1971)
- Order of the Red Banner of Labour (1975)
- Order of the Badge of Honour (1967)
- Medals For Victory over Germany in World War II, Victory over Japan, To commemorate the 30th anniversary of the Soviet Army and Navy, commemorative medals of the anniversary of Victory
- People's Artist of the USSR (1972)
- People's Artist of the RSFSR (1970)
- Honored Artist of the RSFSR (1963)
- People's Artist of Ukraine (2003)
- Lenin Prize (1982) for his role of Lenin in the play On Reading Again... (1980) on the stage LBADT Gorky
- USSR State Prize (1978) a performance of And Quiet Flows the Don by Mikhail Sholokhov, placed on the stage LBADT Gorky (1977)
- Vasilyev Brothers State Prize of the RSFSR (1974) for his role Andrey Ilyitch Bashkirtseva in the movie "The Taming of the Fire" (1972)
- Russian President's Award for Literature and the Arts (1997)
- Russian Presidential Prize for outstanding contribution to the development of Russian cinema (2000)
- Diploma of the Government of Russia (2000)
- Honorary citizen of St. Petersburg (1995)
- Honorary Diploma of the Legislative Assembly of Saint Petersburg (2000)
- Certificate of Merit of the President of Yakutia (2007) [10]
- Winner of Tsarskoye Selo Art Prize (2004)
