= The Living and the Dead (trilogy) =

The Living and the Dead (Russian: Живые и мёртвые, romanized: Zhizvyie i myortvyie) is a trilogy of novels by Konstantin Simonov. It consists of the three novels, The Living and the Dead (Живые и мёртвые, 1959, also translated as Victims and Heroes), Nobody Is Born As Soldier (Солдатами не рождаются, 1962) and The Last Summer (Последнее лето, 1971). The first part was published in English in 1962, the rest of the trilogy is not translated.

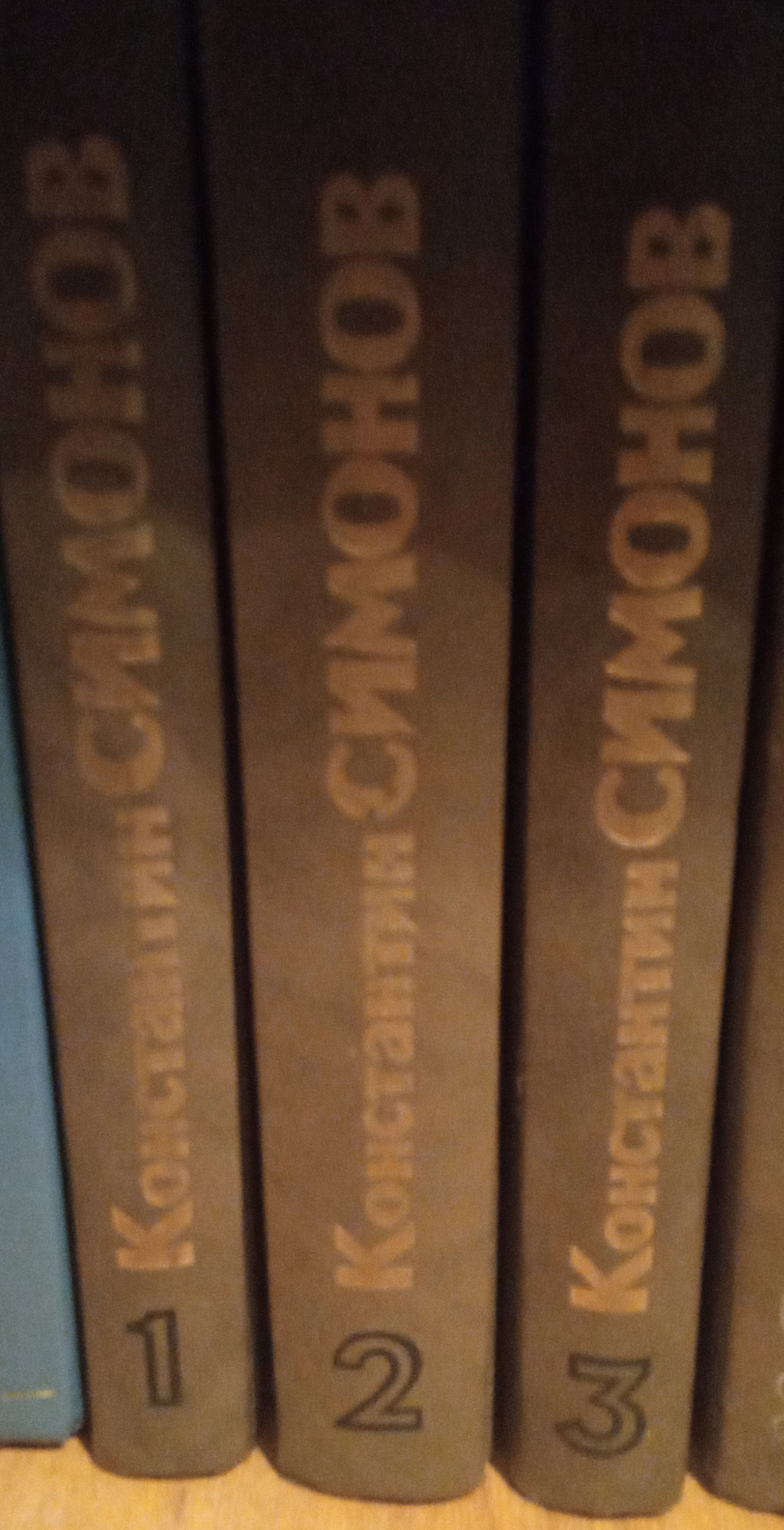
"The Living and the Dead" in Russian language, in three volumes.

The trilogy is probably Simonov's greatest work. As critics noted, "the tragedy of war is depicted as a national tragedy. However, tragedy is not only social, but psychological and moral antagonism too. In that case, it is a conflict between men who share the same views ..."

The first part was filmed as The Alive and the Dead, by Aleksandr Stolper. The second part was filmed in 1969 as Retribution, also by Stolper.
