= Valentina Serova =

Soviet actress (1917–1975)

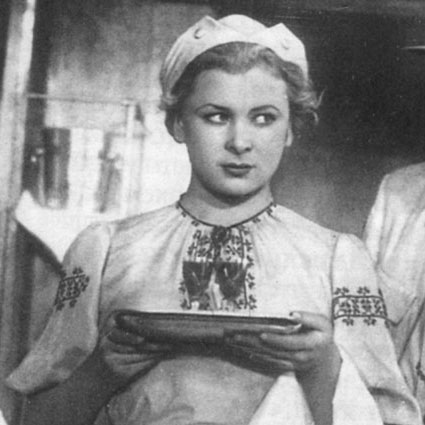
- Valentina Serova in 1939.
- Born: Valentina Polovikova; 23 December 1917; Kharkiv, Ukraine
- Died: 12 December 1975 (aged 57)
- Occupation: Actress

Valentina Vasilyevna Serova (Russian: Валенти́на Васи́льевна Серо́ва; 23 December 1917 – 12 December 1975) was a Soviet film and theatre actress born in the Ukrainian People's Republic. Honored Artist of the RSFSR (1946). She was a winner of the Stalin Prize of the second degree (1947).

== Early life ==
Serova was born Valentina Polovikova (Валентина Половикова) in 1917 in Kharkiv in the family of actress Klavdiya Polovikova (born Didenko) and hydrologist engineer Vasyl Polovyk. She had an affair with the head of Komsomol, Aleksandr Kosarev who was executed on 23 February 1939 during the Great Terror. She escaped being implicated. In 1938, she married her first husband, Anatoly Serov, a Soviet Air Force general, a test and fighter pilot. In 1939 Anatoli Serov died in an air crash together with Polina Osipenko preparing his type rating on the I-16UTI-4.

== Career ==
In 1939, her film A Girl with a Temper had a huge success and she became one of the biggest film stars of the Soviet Union.

In 1940 she met Konstantin Simonov, a famous Soviet author, whom she married in 1943. Simonov's poem "Wait For Me", one of the most famous Russian war poems, is dedicated to her. She subsequently inspired a series of love poems, collected as "With You and Without You" ("С тобой и без тебя"). Their relationship was a troubled one. During the war it was widely rumored that Serova was a mistress of Gen. K.K. Rokossovski.

While it's true that Serova, working as a hospital volunteer, met Rokossovski several times while he was recovering from a shrapnel wound in early 1942, it was not acknowledged. Frontline soldiers saw the two often travelling together. Rokossovski also had another mistress at this time, Dr. Lt. Galina Talanova, with whom he had a daughter in 1945.

== Later years and death ==
Her career declined after the 1940s. Simonov left her in 1957. She became an alcoholic and died in Moscow in 1975.
