= Nikolai Plotnikov =

Russian actor and theatre director (1897–1979)

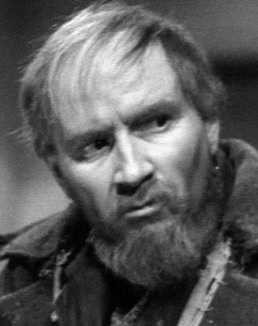
- Plotnikov in 1939
- Born: Nikolai Sergeyevich Plotnikov; 5 November 1897; Vyazma, Vyazemsky Uyezd, Smolensk Governorate, Russian Empire
- Died: 3 February 1979 (aged 81); Moscow, Russian SFSR, Soviet Union
- Occupation: Actor
- Years active: 1920–1979

Nikolai Sergeyevich Plotnikov (Russian: Николай Сергеевич Пло́тников; 5 November 1897 – 3 February 1979) was a Soviet and Russian stage and film actor. People's Artist of the USSR (1966).

== Biography ==
He was born in Vyazma into a family of a hairdresser. As a child, after he lost a majority of his family (mother from tuberculosis, father from myocardial rupture, and both sisters), he was sent to Saint Petersburg to have his uncle look after him. There, he studied in art school of Alexander von Stieglitz (now Saint Petersburg Stieglitz State Academy of Art and Design).

In spring of 1916, he was drafted into the Western Front during World War I. After he returned, he began studying acting in Moscow Art Theatre under supervision of Michael Chekhov.

From 1945 to 1956, he was the director of Film Actor Theater-Study (now National Film Actors' Theatre).

He joined the Communist Party in 1954.

He died in Moscow, and was buried at the Novodevichy Cemetery.

== Filmography ==
- Dawn of Paris (1936) as General Dombrovsky
- The Lonely White Sail (1937) as bearded informant
- The Oppenheim Family (1938) as Edgar Oppenheim
- Lenin in 1918 (1939) as kulak from Tamborsk
- Gorky 2: My Apprenticeship (1939) as Zhikharev
- Gorky 3: My Universities (1940) as Nikiforych
- The Wedding (1944) as the best man
- The Vow (1946) as Ivan Yermilov
- The White Fang (1946) as Handsome Smith
- Ivan Pavlov (1949) as Nikodim Vasilyevich
- The Battle of Stalingrad (1949) as Commissioner Gurov
- The Fall of Berlin (1950) as Walther von Brauchitsch
- Least We Forget (1954) as Vsevolod Yarchuk
- Nine Days in One Year (1962) as Professor Konstantin Ivanovich Sintsov
- Your Contemporary (1967) as Professor Maksim Petrovich Nitochkin
- The Seagull (1972) as Pyotr Nikolayevich Sorin

== Awards and honors ==
- Honored Artist of the RSFSR (1933)
- Stalin Prize, 1st class (1947) – for his role as Ivan Yermilov in The Vow
- People's Artist of the RSFSR (1957)
- People's Artist of the USSR (1966)
- Order of the Red Banner of Labour (1967)
- All-Union Film Festival (1968) — Best Actor (Your Contemporary)
- Karlovy Vary International Film Festival (1968) — Best Actor (Your Contemporary)
- Stanislavsky State Prize of the RSFSR (1970)
- Two Orders of Lenin (1972, 1977)

In Vyazma there is a street named after him.

== Bibliography ==
- Beumers, Birgit. Directory of World Cinema: Russia. Intellect Books, 2011.
