= Plotnikova, Kudymkarsky district =

Plotnikova Плотникова
- Village
- Location within Perm Krai Location within Russia
- Coordinates: 59°01′N 54°44′E
- Country: Russia
- Region: Perm Krai
- District: Kudymkarsky District
- Time zone: UTC+5:00

Plotnikova (Russian: Плотникова) is a rural locality (a village) in Stepanovskoye Rural Settlement, Kudymkarsky District, Perm Krai, Russia. The population was 140 as of 2010. There are 10 streets.

== Geography ==
Plotnikova is located 5 km east of Kudymkar (the district's administrative centre) by road. Malaya Serva is the nearest rural locality.
