= The Living and the Dead (1964 film) =

1964 film

- Film poster
- Directed by: Aleksandr Stolper
- Written by: Aleksandr Stolper; Konstantin Simonov (novel)
- Produced by: Lazar Milkis
- Starring: Kirill Lavrov; Viktor Avdyushko; Anatoli Papanov
- Cinematography: Nikolai Olonovsky
- Edited by: Yekaterina Ovsyannikova
- Production company: Mosfilm
- Release date: 22 February 1964
- Running time: 201 minutes
- Country: Soviet Union
- Language: Russian

The Living and the Dead (Russian: Живые и мёртвые, romanized: Zhivye i myortvye) is a 1964 Soviet World War II drama film directed by Aleksandr Stolper and produced by Mosfilm based on the 1959 novel The Living and the Dead by Konstantin Simonov.

== Plot ==
The film spans the period from the early days of the Great Patriotic War to the middle of winter 1941–1942, culminating in the Soviet counteroffensive near Moscow. This grand narrative of six months of catastrophic retreat followed by a powerful counterstrike is shown through the experiences of one man, Ivan Sintsov (played by Kirill Lavrov), a correspondent for an army newspaper. The war begins while Sintsov is on vacation with his wife, and he tries to return to his unit located in Western Belarus. However, his unit is overrun by the advancing Wehrmacht, making the journey impossible.

Near the town of Borisov, Sintsov meets another officer also attempting to reach his unit. Together, they go to the road to find transportation, but during a German air raid, the officer and the car he stopped are blown up. Sintsov continues his journey alone, eventually being assigned to a military newspaper in Mogilev and later another near Yelnia. The movie describes his work as a war correspondent during these trying times and his encounters with figures like Brigade Commander Fyodor Serpilin (played by Anatoly Papanov), whose steadfastness deeply influences him. Through his experiences, Sintsov transitions from a journalist to a soldier, ultimately fighting as a common infantryman, convinced that he must fulfill his duty in the face of adversity.

== Cast ==
- Kirill Lavrov as Ivan Sintsov
- Viktor Avdyushko as Sergeant Shestakov, commander of the gun
- Anatoli Papanov as General Serpilin
- Aleksei Glazyrin as Malinin
- Oleg Yefremov as Ivanov
- Lyudmila Krylova as Ovsyannikova
- Ludmila Lyubimova as Masha Sintsova
- Lev Lyubetskiy as Commissar
- Vasili Makarov as Nikolay Petrovich Zaichikov
- Roman Khomyatov as Lyusun
- Yevgeny Samoylov as Communist commander of a battalion
- Zinovy Vysokovsky as Mikhail Weinstein, military photographer
- Oleg Tabakov as Krutikov
- Boris Chirkov as Biryukov
- Mikhail Gluzsky as Major General Orlov
- Yevgeni Shutov as policeman
- Valentina Telegina as aunt Pasha Kulikova
- Mikhail Ulyanov as Sergei Filippovich, Army Commander
- Lyubov Sokolova as doctor (episode)
- Vladimir Vysotsky as soldier (episode)
- Alla Budnitskaya as Masha's friend
