= Dmitri Vasilyev (director) =

Soviet and Russian film director

- Born: Dmitri Ivanovich Vasilyev; 21 October 1900; Yeysk, Russian Empire
- Died: 5 January 1984 (aged 83); Moscow, Soviet Union
- Occupation: Film director

Dmitri Ivanovich Vasilyev (Russian: Дмитрий Иванович Васильев; 21 October 1900 – 5 January 1984) was a Soviet and Russian film director. He was a laureate of two Stalin Prizes in 1947 and 1951.

Vasilyev worked as the assistant director to Sergei Eisenstein on Alexander Nevsky (1938). Due to demands that the film be produced rapidly, according to film historian Jay Leyda, Vasiliev took over much of the direction of the film.

Vasilyev’s 1958 film Over Tissa was a major box office success in the Soviet Union, the most viewed film of that year, selling around 45 million tickets, and the third most viewed film of the 1950s.

== Filmography ==
- The Last Night (1936); co-directed with Yuli Raizman
- Lenin in October (1937); co-directed with Mikhail Romm
- Alexander Nevsky (1938); co-directed with Sergei Eisenstein
- In the Name of the Fatherland (1943); co-directed with Vsevolod Pudovkin
- Admiral Nakhimov (1946); co-directed with Vsevolod Pudovkin
- Zhukovsky (1950); co-directed with Vsevolod Pudovkin
- Youth Sports Festival (1951)
- The Mystery of the Eternal Night (1955)
- Over Tissa (1958)
- Operation Cobra (1960), director
- Attack and Retreat (1964); co-directed with Giuseppe De Santis
