= Vladimir Tendryakov =

Soviet short story writer

- Born: December 5, 1923; Makarovskaya, Russian SFSR
- Died: August 3, 1984 (aged 60); Moscow, Soviet Union

Vladimir Tendryakov (Russian: Влади́мир Фёдорович Тендряко́в) (December 5, 1923 – August 3, 1984) was a Soviet short story writer and novelist.

== Biography ==
He was born at Makarovskaya near Vologda in 1923. His father was a civil servant. In 1941, he was drafted into the Red Army and was sent to the front as a radio-operator. He was wounded twice; near Stalingrad and, more seriously, near Kharkov. After his recovery, in 1944, he was demobilized and settled in the Kirov Oblast, where he worked as a school teacher.

In 1945, he relocated to Moscow and entered the All-Russian State Institute of Cinematography. A year later, he transferred to the Maxim Gorky Literature Institute; graduating in 1951.

He had begun to write while still a student and, from 1948 to 1953, published several stories in Ogonyok. He became a professional writer in 1955, during the first wave of Nikita Khrushchev's destalinization. Most of his works faced some degree of censorship and many were not published until the Perestroika period. His novel Assassinating Mirages (Pokushenie na mirazhi) (written 1979-1982), which was critical of the Soviet state, remained unpublished until 1987.

After 1964, he served on the editorial board of the journal Science and Religion. In 1966, he was one of the signatories to the "Letter of 25", opposing Brezhnev's plans to rehabilitate Stalin. In 1967, he became a board member at the Union of Soviet Writers.

Tendryakov as a writer was a foremost ethicist, and most of his works revolve around the problems of moral choice. Thus, his most famous novella "Three, Seven, Ace" (Тройка, Семерка, Туз) is about an ordinary citizen's fear to speak up and save an innocent man from a murder conviction. His novella "Potholes" (Ukhaby) describes an accident victim's life being sacrificed to blind adherence to rules and regulation. His novel Assassinating Mirages is Tendryakov's masterpiece, containing a lifetime of reflections on issues of ethics, violence, cruelty and difficulty of moral choice (the novel's plot revolves around a physicist's attempt to analyse History by creating a computer model of it, then removing the figure of Jesus Christ from the equation and studying the differences that result. The answer comes as a complete surprise.)

Tendryakov died of a stroke in Moscow in 1984, a year before the beginning of Perestroika.

== Works ==
=== English translations ===
- Son-in-Law, Moscow, Foreign Languages Publishing House, [1956 or 1957], 162p.
- Three, Seven, Ace & Other Stories, tr. by David Alger, Olive Stevens and Paul Falla, London, Harvill Press, 1973, ISBN 0-00-271757-3, 252p. Contents:
  - Three, Seven, Ace
  - Justice
  - Creature of a Day
- A Topsy-Turvy Spring: Stories, Moscow, Progress Publishers, 1978, 413p.
- Donna Anna, from The Wild Beach and Other Stories, Ardis Publishers, 1992.
- Bread for a Dog, from 50 Writers: An Anthology of 20th Century Russian Short Stories, Academic Studies Press, 2011.

=== In Russian ===
- Находка (Nakhodka) (1965)
- Не ко двору (Ne ko dvory) (1954)
- Суд (Sud) (1960)
- Тройка, семерка, туз (Troika, semerka, tuz = Three, seven, ace) (1961)
- Ухабы (Ukhaby) (1956)
- Путешествие длиной в век (Puteshestvie dlinoj v vek), in Anthology of Modern Science Fiction in 25 volumes (Библиотека современной фантастики), volume 19, Moscow, Molodaya Gvardiya, 1965 — 1973.
- Ночь после выпуска (Noch' posle vypuska) (1972)
- Чистые воды Китежа (Chistye vody Kitezha)
- Покушение на миражи (Pokushenie na mirazhi)

== Notes ==
- See David Gillespie. "Russian Literature, 1953-1991" in The Routledge Companion to Russian Literature, ed. Neil Cornwell, London, Routledge, 2001, ISBN 0-415-23366-6 p. 230
