= Aleksandr Plotnikov =

Russian footballer

Personal information
- Full name: Aleksandr Aleksandrovich Plotnikov
- Date of birth: 17 February 1979 (age 47)
- Place of birth: Rostov-on-Don, Russian SFSR
- Height: 1.90 m (6 ft 3 in)
- Position: Goalkeeper

Youth career
- 1996–1998: Rostselmash Rostov-on-Don

Senior career*
Years	Team	Apps	(Gls)
1996–1998	Rostselmash Rostov-on-Don	0	(0)
1996–1997	→ Rostselmash-d Rostov-on-Don	35	(0)
1999–2000	Metallist Taganrog		
2001–2002	Biokhimik-Mordovia Saransk	55	(0)
2003–2005	Olimpia Volgograd	73	(0)
2006–2007	Darida Minsk Raion	45	(0)
2008–2010	Dinamo Brest	88	(0)
2011	Zhemchuzhina Sochi	0	(0)
2011–2012	Chernomorets Novorossiysk	8	(0)
2012–2015	Yenisey Krasnoyarsk	80	(0)
- * Club domestic league appearances and goals

Aleksandr Aleksandrovich Plotnikov (Russian: Александр Александрович Плотников; born 17 February 1979) is a Russian former professional footballer who played as a goalkeeper.
