= Wait for Me (poem) =

1941 poem by Konstantin Simonov

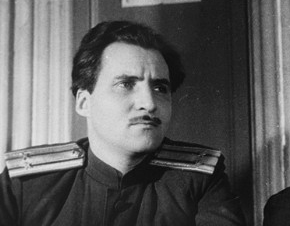
Konstantin Michailowitsch Simonow

Wait for Me (Жди меня), written by the Russian poet and playwright turned war correspondent Konstantin Simonov, is one of the best known Russian World War II poems.

== Writing ==
The poem was written by Simonov over a few days in July 1941 after he left his love Valentina Serova behind to take on his new duties of war correspondent on the battlefront. In 1969, Simonov wrote in a letter to a friend: "The poem Wait for me has no special story. I just went to war, and the woman I loved was in the rear. And I wrote her a letter in verse". Simonov first read Wait for Me in public on October 13, 1941 in Murmansk. Simonov was serving as a war correspondent covering the ordeal of the 14th Army that was defending the Arctic port cities of Archangel and Murmansk against a German offensive launched from Norway and Finland that aimed to take an end to the "Murmansk run" by capturing the two principle Soviet port cities on the Arctic ocean.

Simonov first tried to publish Wait For Me in Na Shturm, the newspaper of the 44th Army in November 1941 to which he had been attached to as a war correspondent. An attempt to publish Wait for Me in the Red Star, the newspaper of the Red Army, was no more successful. Wait for Me was finally published on page 3 of Pravda on 14 January 1942, which first brought the poem to widespread attention. Little was expected of Wait for Me, as indicated by its place on page 3, but the poem became an unexpected hit.

== Reception ==
One of the most popular poems ever written in Russia, Wait for Me was especially popular with the frontoviks (front-line soldiers) in the Great Patriotic War, as Russians call World War II. A number of servicemen cut out the poem from Pravda and mailed it to their girlfriends and wives, who in turn wrote poems declaring that they would wait for their men to return from the war. The popularity of Wait for Me took the Soviet authorities by surprise, but once aware of the enthusiastic public response as countless demands for the poem came in, Wait for Me became an unofficial poetical anthem that symbolized the willingness to endure sacrifices and pain in the pursuit of victory. The way that Wait for Me became popular was quite normal as the frontoviks would cut out from the newspapers poems that they liked and mail it off to their loved ones on the home front, which allowed the authorities to gauge what poems were popular. The American scholars Richard Stites and James von Geldern wrote about the impact of Wait for me that it was : "...heard on the radio throughout the war, recited by millions as though it were a prayer, repeated by women as tears streamed down their faces, and adopted by men as their own expression of the mystical power of a woman's love".

During the war, it was common for Soviet newspapers to publish after-poems (poems written in response to another poem) by various women who declared their willingness to wait for the return of their husbands or boyfriends. Most frontoviks knew Wait for Me by heart, and it was very common for frontoviks to carry a locket with a picture of their wives or girlfriends in it, which a copy of Wait for Me was wrapped around, as a sign of their desire to return to their loved ones and to survive the war. Many soldiers seemed to believe that this would somehow help them to survive the war, as if declaring their love by wrapping the poem around a picture of their loved ones, would protect them and ensure that they would get back home.

A companion piece for Wait for Me was Kill Him!, a viscerally violent poem by Simonov that began with the line "Kill a German!/Kill him soon!", a poem that was popular at the time, but whose popularity faded after the war while the appeal of Wait for Me did not diminish after the war. Much of the popularity of Wait for Me during the war was the sense of longing expressed by the soldier narrator of the poem who promises to return to his woman whose love allows him to endure any suffering along the promise of a return to normality once the war ended. Likewise, much of the appeal of Wait for Me was the intimate and tender feelings expressed by the soldier narrator who wants to survive the war as he only wishes to return to the woman he loves once the war is over. At a time when bombastic war poems were common, Wait For Me stood out in the sense that though the soldier narrator embraces his duty in the Great Patriotic War, he primarily wants to be with the woman he loves, which helped explained why so many servicemen along with their wives and girlfriends embraced the poem as a sort of anthem.

In a cruel twist of fate for Simonov, the woman to whom Wait for Me was dedicated, Valentina Serova, did not wait for him, and instead became the "campaign wife" of Marshal Konstantin Rokossovsky in 1942. The Russian term "pokhodno-polevaya zhena ("field campaign wife") referred to the mistresses of Red Army officers whose relationships had a semi-formal status.

== Music and film adaptions ==
In 1942 Aleksandr Lokshin composed a symphonic poem for mezzo-soprano and orchestra on the verses of Wait for me. Lokshin composed later a version of the same work for baritone, piano and flute-piccolo. In 1943, the poem Wait for Me was turned into a film also entitled Wait for Me that was co-written by Simonov and starred Serova.

== Sources ==
- Grant, Bruce; Barker, Adele Marie (2010). The Russia Reader History, Culture, Politics. Lexington: Duke University Press. ISBN 9780822346487.
- Merridale, Catherine (2005). Ivan's War The Red Army 1939-1945. London: Faber and Faber.
- Grossman, Vasily; Beevor, Antony (2007). A Writer at War A Soviet Journalist with the Red Army, 1941-1945. New York: Knopf Doubleday Publishing Group. ISBN 9780307275332.
- Rothstein, Robert (1995). "Homeland, Home Town, and Battlefield: The Popular Song". In Richard Stites (ed.). Culture and Entertainment in Wartime Russia. Bloomington: Indiana University Press. pp. 77–107. ISBN 9780253209498.
- Geldern, James von; Stites, Richard, eds. (1995). Mass Culture in Soviet Russia: Tales, Poems, Songs, Movies, Plays, and Folklore, 1917–1953. Bloomington, In.: Indiana University Press. ISBN 0-253-20969-2.
- Sokolov, Boris (2015). Marshal K.K. Rokossovsky The Red Army's Gentleman Commander. Warwick: Helion. ISBN 9781912174508.
