= Aleksandr Stolper =

Soviet film director

Aleksandr Borisovich Stolper (Russian: Александр Борисович Столпер; 12 August 1907 – 12 January 1979) was a Soviet film director and screenwriter. He directed 14 films between 1940 and 1977. Aleksandr Stolper was awarded the Stalin Prize in 1949 and 1951 and received the honorary title People's Artist of the USSR in 1977.

== Filmography ==
- The Law of Life (1940)
- Lad from Our Town (1942)
- Wait for Me (1943)
- Days and Nights (1945)
- Our Heart (1946)
- Tale of a True Man (1948)
- Far from Moscow (1950)
- The Road (1955)
- A Unique Spring (1957)
- Hard Happiness (1958)
- The Alive and the Dead (1964)
- Retribution (1967)
- The Fourth (1972)
- Slope: Zero (1977)
