= Nikolai Kryukov (composer) =

Russian composer

Nikolai Nikolayevich Kryukov (Russian: Николай Николаевич Крюков; 2 February 1908 – 5 April 1961) was a Russian composer active in the Soviet era.

Kryukov was prominent in the Soviet film industry, with more than 40 film score credits for films released between 1949 and 1962. His name is attached to the score provided for a 1950 release of Eisenstein's film The Battleship Potemkin (1925).
