= List of Soviet films of 1947 =

A list of films produced in the Soviet Union in 1947 (see 1947 in film).

== 1947 ==
| Title | Original title | Director | Cast | Genre | Notes |
|---|---|---|---|---|---|
1947
| Admiral Nakhimov | Адмирал Нахимов | Vsevolod Pudovkin | Aleksei Dikiy, Ruben Simonov | Biopic | |
| Boy from the Outskirts | Мальчик с окраины | Vasily Zhuravlyov | Yevgeny Samoylov | Drama | |
| Cinderella | Золушка | Nadezhda Kosheverova, Mikhail Shapiro | Janina Żejmo, Aleksei Konsovsky, Erast Garin, Faina Ranevskaya | Fairy tale, musical | |
| For Those Who Are at Sea | За тех, кто в море | Aleksandr Faintsimmer | Mikhail Zharov | Drama | |
| The Humpbacked Horse | Конёк-Горбунок | Ivan Ivanov-Vano | Georgiy Millyar, Georgy Vitsin, Valentina Sperantova, Anatoly Kubatsky | Fairy tale | |
| In the Name of Life | Во имя жизни | Iosif Kheifits, Aleksandr Zarkhi | Viktor Khokhryakov, Mikhail Kuznetsov, Oleg Zhakov, Klavdiya Lepanova | Drama | |
| Light over Russia | Свет над Россией | Sergei Yutkevich | Nikolai Kolesnikov | History | |
| Miklukho-Maklai | Миклухо-Маклай | Aleksandr Razumny | Sergei Kurilov | Drama | |
| Pirogov | Пирогов | Grigori Kozintsev | Konstantin Skorobogatov, Vladimir Chestnokov | Biopic | |
| Private Aleksandr Matrosov | Рядовой Александр Матросов | Leonid Lukov | Anatoliy Ignatyev | Drama | |
| Robinson Crusoe | Робинзон Крузо | Aleksandr Andriyevsky | Pavel Kadochnikov, Yuri Lyubimov | Adventure | |
| Russian Ballerina | Солистка балета | Aleksandr Ivanovsky | Mira Redina | Musical | |
| Secret Agent | Подвиг разведчика | Boris Barnet | Pavel Kadochnikov; Sergei Petrov; Dmitri Milyutenko; Viktor Dobrovolsky | Action | |
| Springtime | Весна | Grigori Aleksandrov | Lyubov Orlova, Nikolai Cherkasov, Faina Ranevskaya | Musical, comedy | |
| The Train Goes East | Поезд идёт на восток | Yuli Raizman | Lidiya Dranovskaya | Comedy | |
| The Village Teacher | Сельская учительница | Mark Donskoy | Vera Maretskaya | Drama | |

== See also ==
- 1947 in the Soviet Union
