= List of Soviet films of 1942 =

A list of films produced in the Soviet Union in 1942 (see 1942 in film).

== 1942 ==
Title	Original title	Director	Cast	Genre	Notes
1942
Antosha Rybkin	Антоша Рыбкин	Konstantin Yudin	Boris Chirkov	Comedy	
The Defense of Tsaritsyn	Оборона Царицына	Vasilyev brothers	Mikheil Gelovani	Drama	
The District Secretary	Секретарь райкома	Ivan Pyryev	Vasili Vanin	Drama	
A Good Lad	Славный малый	Boris Barnet	Evgeniy Grigorev	Musical	
His Name Is Sukhe-Bator	Его зовут Сухэ-Батор	Iosif Kheifits, Aleksandr Zarkhi	Nikolay Cherkasov	Drama	
Kotovsky	Котовский	Aleksandr Faintsimmer	Nikolay Mordvinov	Drama	
Lad from Our Town	Парень из нашего города	Boris Ivanov, Aleksandr Stolper	Nikolay Kryuchkov	Drama	
Mashenka	Машенька	Yuli Raizman	Valentina Karavayeva, Mikhail Kuznetsov	Drama	
Moscow Strikes Back	Разгром немецких войск под Москвой	Leonid Varlamov, Ilya Kopalin		Documentary, war	One of four winners at the 15th Academy Awards for Best Documentary
The Murderers are Coming	Убийцы выходят на дорогу	Vsevolod Pudovkin, Yuri Tarich	Mikhail Astangov, Boris Blinov, Sofiya Magarill, Ada Vojtsik, Oleg Zhakov, Olga Zhiznyeva	War film	
Timour's Oath	Клятва Тимура	Lev Kuleshov			

== See also ==
- 1942 in the Soviet Union
