= List of Soviet films of 1939 =

A list of films produced in the Soviet Union in 1939 (see 1939 in film).

== 1939 ==
| Title | Russian title | Director | Cast | Genre | Notes |
|---|---|---|---|---|---|
1939
| A Girl with a Temper | Девушка с характером | Konstantin Yudin | Valentina Serova, Emma Tsesarskaya, Andrei Tutyshkin | Comedy | |
| Commandant of the Bird Island | Комендант Птичьего острова | Vasili Pronin | Alexei Dolinin | Drama | |
| Courage | Мужество | Mikhail Kalatozov | Oleg Zhakov | Adventure | |
| Doctor Kalyuzhnyy | Доктор Калюжный | Erast Garin | Boris Tolmazov | Drama | |
| Engineer Kochin's Error | Ошибка инженера Кочина | Aleksandr Macheret | Mikhail Zharov | Thriller | |
| The Golden Key | Золотой ключик | Aleksandr Ptushko | Aleksandr Shchagin | Fantasy | |
| Gorky 2: My Apprenticeship | В людях | Mark Donskoy | Aleksei Lyarsky | Drama | |
| Lenin in 1918 | Ленин в 1918 году | Mikhail Romm | Boris Shchukin, Nikolai Okhlopkov | Biopic | |
| Man in a Shell | Человек в футляре | Isidor Annensky | Nikolay Khmelyov | Drama | |
| Member of the Government | Член правительства | Iosif Kheifits, Aleksandr Zarkhi | Vera Maretskaya | Drama | |
| Minin and Pozharsky | Минин и Пожарский | Vsevolod Pudovkin, Mikhail Doller | Aleksandr Khanov, Boris Livanov, Boris Chirkov | History, drama | |
| The New Teacher | Учитель | Sergei Gerasimov | Boris Chirkov | Drama | |
| The Oppenheim Family | Семья Оппенгейм | Grigori Roshal | Vladimir Balashov | Drama | |
| Squadron No. 5 | Эскадрилья № 5 | Abram Room | Yuri Shumsky | War drama | |
| Tractor Drivers | Трактористы | Ivan Pyryev | Marina Ladynina | Drama | |
| Shchors | Щорс | Aleksandr Dovzhenko | Yevgeni Samojlov | Biopic | |
| Stepan Razin | Степан Разин | Ivan Pravov and Olga Preobrazhenskaya | | | |
| The Tale of the Priest and of His Workman Balda | Сказка о попе и о работнике его Балде | Mikhail Tsekhanovsky | | Animation | |
| The Vyborg Side | Выборгская сторона | Grigori Kozintsev, Leonid Trauberg | Boris Chirkov, Valentina Kibardina, Mikhail Zharov | Drama | |
| Vasilisa the Beautiful | Василиса Прекрасная | Aleksandr Rou | V. Sorogozhskaya, Georgy Millyar, Sergei Stolyarov | Fantasy | |
| Virgin Soil Upturned | Поднятая целина | Yuli Raizman | Gavriil Belov | Drama | |

== See also ==
- 1939 in the Soviet Union
