= The Precious Seed =

- Russian: Драгоценные зёрна
- Directed by: Iosif Kheifits; Aleksandr Zarkhi
- Written by: Esfir Buranova
- Produced by: I. Goldin
- Starring: Galina Kozhakina; Boris Zhukovsky; Oleg Zhakov; Pavel Kadochnikov; Vasili Vanin
- Cinematography: Sergei Ivanov
- Edited by: A. Soboleva
- Music by: Venedikt Pushkov
- Production company: Lenfilm
- Release date: 1948
- Running time: 89 min.
- Country: Soviet Union
- Language: Russian

The Precious Seed (Russian: Драгоценные зёрна) is a 1948 Soviet melodrama film directed by Iosif Kheifits and Aleksandr Zarkhi.

== Plot ==
Fifth-year journalism student Antonina Uvarova is sent to a collective farm to complete her diploma project—publishing three issues of a district newspaper titled For a High Yield. In her first issue, she hastily praises a combine operator named Yashkin and mocks the farm's agronomist, Arkhipov. However, she soon learns that Yashkin is in fact a careless worker who leaves behind significant grain losses in the fields. He is supported by the chairman of the district executive committee, Korolyov, whose priority is harvesting as quickly as possible to report high performance, win awards, and gain recognition—regardless of waste. In contrast, Arkhipov insists on minimizing losses and harvesting the crops conscientiously.

With the help of Ivashin, the district party committee secretary, Uvarova gradually uncovers the deeper conflict between Arkhipov and Korolyov. Over time, her sympathies shift toward the principled agronomist, with whom she eventually develops a romantic relationship.

== Cast ==
- Galina Kozhakina as Antonina Uvarova, student, newspaper editor
- Boris Zhukovsky as Korolyov, chairman of the district executive committee
- Oleg Zhakov as Ivashin, district party committee secretary
- Pavel Kadochnikov as Ivan Arkhipov, agronomist
- Vasili Vanin
- Valentina Telegina
- Pyotr Aleynikov
- Rostislav Plyatt
- Pavel Olenev
- Olga Aroseva
- Sergey Filippov
- Lyudmila Shabalina
- Nikolai Dorokhin
- Vladimir Kazarinov
- Aleksandr Melnikov
- Viktor Khokhryakov
- Sergey Filippov
- Tatyana Pelttser
