= The Lights of Baku =

- Directed by: Iosif Kheifits; Rza Tahmasib; Aleksandr Zarkhi
- Written by: Grigori Koltunov; Yevgeni Pomeshchikov
- Starring: Mirza Aliyev; Merziyye Davudova; Nikolai Okhlopkov
- Cinematography: Gavriil Egiazarov
- Music by: Qara Qarayev
- Production company: Baku Film Studio
- Release date: 1950
- Running time: 84 minutes
- Country: Soviet Union
- Language: Russian-Azerbaijani

The Lights of Baku (Russian: Огни Баку, romanized: Ogni Baku) is a 1950 Soviet drama film directed by Iosif Kheifits, Rza Tahmasib and Aleksandr Zarkhi. The film portrays workers in the oil fields of Azerbaijan during the Second World War, when they were of great strategic importance. Scenes featuring Mikheil Gelovani as Joseph Stalin were later cut after the dictator's death when his cult of personality had come under attack from the new Soviet leadership.

The film's sets were designed by the art director Mikhail Yuferov.

== Cast ==
- Mirza Aliyev as Alibala Aliyev
- Merziyye Davudova as Anakhanim
- Nikolai Okhlopkov as Satrov
- Naciba Malikova as Mirvarid
- Inci Eroglu as Fuad
- Nikolay Kryuchkov as Paramanov
- Pyotr Arzhanov as Qarsiya
- Serke Kozhamkulov as Qadir
- Vladimir Gardin as Verfild
- Viktor Stanitsyn as Winston Churchill
- Kh. Malikov as The Oilman
- Mukhlis Dzhanni-zade as Qara
- Heiri Emirzade
- Mikheil Gelovani as Stalin
- Munavar Kalantarli as Sakin
- Aziza Mammadova as Sakin
- Mikayil Mikayilov as Ingilis zabiti
- Nikolai Mordvinov as Lavrentiy Beriya (scenes deleted)
- Rza Tahmasib as Mir Cafar Bagirov
- Emmanuil Geller as Waiter
- Georgiy Georgiu as Member of British mission
- Aleksandr Shatov as Charles Semmer

== Bibliography ==
- Rollberg, Peter. Historical Dictionary of Russian and Soviet Cinema. Scarecrow Press, 2008.
