= Cities and Years =

1930 film

- Russian: Города и годы
- Directed by: Yevgeni Chervyakov
- Written by: Yevgeni Chervyakov; Konstantin Fedin (novel); Dmitri Tolmachyov; Nathan Zarkhi
- Starring: Bernhard Goetzke; Ivan Chuvelyov; Gennadiy Michurin; Sofiya Magarill; Andrei Kostrichkin
- Release date: 1930
- Country: Soviet Union

Cities and Years (Russian: Города и годы) is a 1930 Soviet silent drama film directed by Yevgeni Chervyakov.

== Plot ==
The film is based on the eponymous novel by Konstantin Fedin.

== Cast ==
- Bernhard Goetzke as Col. von Schonau
- Ivan Chuvelyov as Andrei Startsov
- Gennadiy Michurin as Kurt Van
- Sofiya Magarill as Marie Uhrbach
- Andrei Kostrichkin as Albert Birman (as A. Kostrichkin)
- David Gutman as Uhrbach
- M. Semakina as Martha Birman
- Boris Medvedev as Officer
- Pyotr Pirogov as Pole
- Sergei Ponachevny as A man in the cafe
