= Nikolay Mordvinov =

Nikolay Mordvinov may refer to:

- Nikolay Mordvinov (admiral) (1754–1845), Russian admiral
- Nikolay Mordvinov (actor) (1901–1966), Russian actor
