= Baltic Deputy =

1936 film

- Russian: Депутат Балтики
- Directed by: Iosif Kheifits; Aleksandr Zarkhi
- Written by: Iosif Kheifits; Leonid Lyubashevsky; Leonid Rakhmanov; Aleksandr Zarkhi
- Produced by: Igor Chernyak; Pyotr Podvalny
- Starring: Nikolai Cherkasov; Mariya Domashyova; Boris Livanov; Oleg Zhakov; Aleksandr Melnikov
- Cinematography: Mikhail Kaplan; Edgar Shtyrtskober
- Music by: Nikolai Timofeyev
- Production company: Lenfilm
- Release date: 1936
- Running time: 96 min.
- Country: Soviet Union
- Language: Russian

Baltic Deputy (Russian: Депутат Балтики, romanized: Deputat Baltiki) is a 1936 Soviet drama film directed by Iosif Kheifits and Aleksandr Zarkhi.

The premiere of the film in the United States took place on September 3, 1937, and on September 27 in the Pennsylvania it was banned from showing by the censorship board.

== Plot ==
The Bolsheviks seize power in Russia. Students instead of studying are fond of politics. Teachers and scientists do not trust the new government. But the elderly professor Dmitry Illarionovich Polezhaev is able to understand the events that occur in Russia. He begins to train the Baltic sailors, after which he is elected a deputy from the sailors of the Baltic Fleet.

== Cast ==
- Nikolay Cherkasov as Professor Dmitri Illarionovich Polezhayev (рrototype by Kliment Timiryazev)
- Mariya Domashyova as Masha Polezhayeva
- Boris Livanov as Misha Bocharov
- Oleg Zhakov as Vikenti Mikhailovich Vorob'yov
- Aleksandr Melnikov as Red guardsman Kupriyanov (voiced by Yuri Tolubeyev)
- Yakov Malyutin as Pirogov
- Aleksei Matov as doktor
- Fyodor Kurikhin as doctor
