= My Motherland (film) =

- Russian: Моя Родина
- Directed by: Iosif Kheifits; Aleksandr Zarkhi
- Written by: Mikhail Bleiman; Iosif Kheifits; Aleksandr Zarkhi
- Starring: Bari Haydarov; Gennadiy Michurin; Aleksandr Melnikov; Yanina Zheymo; Yun Fa-shu
- Cinematography: Moisei Kaplan
- Music by: Gavriil Popov
- Release date: 1933
- Country: Soviet Union
- Language: Russian

My Motherland (Russian: Моя Родина) is a 1933 Soviet film directed by Iosif Kheifits and Aleksandr Zarkhi.

As a result of the Chinese attack on the Chinese-East Railway, the Russians take prisoner of a soldier named Van. Together with his officer, Van escapes from captivity, but a conflict grows between them.

== Plot ==
A young Chinese laborer, Wang Boxiak (played by Khaidarov), returns to a squalid lodging house after work, where impoverished peasants share space with opium smokers, prostitutes, and livestock. A military patrol arrives and forcibly recruits Wang into the army of the Kuomintang. Meanwhile, at a Soviet border outpost, Red Army soldiers Vasily (Melnikov) and "Baby" (Nazarenko) practice Chinese phrases about class solidarity with the peasants of Manchuria. That evening, Vasily takes his shift on guard duty but is captured by a semi-bandit group of Chinese soldiers allied with remnants of the defeated White Army officers. Among the soldiers is Wang, who witnesses the brutal interrogation of Vasily by Captain Alyabyev (Zhakov) during a raid on a peaceful village.

The Chinese army initiates a direct invasion of Soviet territory, beginning with an attack on a border bridge. A small group of Red Army soldiers valiantly defends their position at the cost of their lives. A massive Soviet counteroffensive repels the invaders. Wang Boxiak, along with many other Chinese soldiers, is taken prisoner, where he observes the stark contrast in the humane treatment of captives by the Soviet forces. After dinner, Wang encounters an officer from his unit, who, feigning friendship and equality, persuades Wang to help him escape. However, once free, the officer reverts to his authoritarian ways, demanding obedience. In a confrontation, Wang kills the officer and returns to the Red Army camp.

In a swift operation, Soviet forces secure several border villages and, following the signing of the Khabarovsk Protocol, return triumphantly to their bases. Chinese peasants and laborers, including Wang Boxiak, bid them farewell as comrades.

== Cast ==
- Bari Haydarov as Van
- Gennadiy Michurin as Vas'ka
- Aleksandr Melnikov as Vasya
- Yanina Zheymo as Olya
- Yun Fa-shu as The Manchurian officer
- Konstantin Nazarenko as Malyutka
- Lyudmila Semyonova as Lyudmila
- Oleg Zhakov as Alyabyev
