= My Beloved (disambiguation) =

My Beloved is a 2012 Philippine television drama romance fantasy series.

My Beloved may also refer to:

- "My Beloved", a song by Kari Jobe from the 2009 album Kari Jobe
- "My Beloved", a song by Crowder from the 2014 album Neon Steeple
- My Beloved (album), a 2014 album by Ahmad Hussain
- My Beloved (film), a 1958 Soviet romance drama film
- Mere Mehboob, or My Beloved, a 1963 Indian film
- Mere Sanam (lit. 'My Beloved'), a 1965 Indian film
