= Vladimir Lepko =

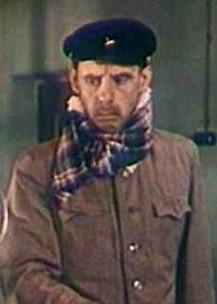
- Vladimir Lepko in The Train Goes East (1947)
- Born: 25 December 1898; Gagra, Russian Empire
- Died: 19 October 1963 (aged 64); Moscow, Soviet Union
- Occupation: Actor
- Years active: 1914–1963

Vladimir Lepko (Russian: Влади́мир Алексе́евич Лепко́; 1898–1963) was a Soviet and Russian actor. People's Artist of the RSFSR (1954).

He died 19 October 1963 and is buried at Novodevichy Cemetery.

== Selected filmography ==
- The Overcoat (1926) (uncredited)
- Lieutenant Kijé (1934) (uncredited)
- Revolt of the Fishermen (1934)
- Lyotchiki (1935)
- The Lonely White Sail (1937)
- Wish upon a Pike (1938)
- The Train Goes East (1947)
- They Have a Motherland (1949)
- Cossacks of the Kuban (1950)
- The Miners of Donetsk (1950) (uncredited)
- True Friends (1954) (uncredited)
- Did We Meet Somewhere Before (1954)
- The Rumyantsev Case (1955)
- Ivan Brovkin on the State Farm (1955)
- Be Careful, Grandma! (1960)
