= Zhakov =

Zhakov (Russian: Жаков) is a Russian masculine surname originating from a nickname Zhak, which referred to an apprentice in a Catholic church; its feminine counterpart is Zhakova. The surname may refer to the following notable people:

- Oleg Zhakov (1905–1988), Russian film actor
