= Red Army Days =

- Directed by: Alexander Zarkhi; Iosif Kheifits
- Starring: Nikolay Simonov; Tatiana Okunevskaya; Nikolai Cherkasov; Janina Żejmo; Alexey Gribov
- Production company: Lenfilm
- Release date: 1935
- Running time: 90 min.
- Country: Soviet Union
- Language: Russian

Hectic Days

Red Army Days (Russian: Горячие денечки, romanized: Goryachie denyochki) is a 1935 Soviet comedy film directed by Alexander Zarkhi and Iosif Kheifits.

== Plot ==
In the provincial town for exercises come tank units of the Red Army. Tank commander Mikhail Belokon (Simon) rents a room at the agricultural school student Tonya Zhukova (Okunevskaya). Between the young people there a romantic attachment. However, each of them believes that the nascent feelings can interfere with more important, in their view, the case in life: to Tonya - tuition at the college for Mikhail - the preparation of military vehicles and soldiers for upcoming maneuvers. Nevertheless, the characters pass by a strip of misunderstanding and explain each other in love.

== Cast ==
- Nikolai Simonov as Tank Commander Mikhail Trofimovich Belokon
- Tatiana Okunevskaya as Tonya Zhukova (as T. Okunyovskaya)
- Yanina Zheymo as Kika, her friend (as Ya. Zheimo)
- Nikolay Cherkasov as Kolka Loshak
- Aleksandr Melnikov as Tank Driver Melnikov
- Matvey Pavlikov as Tank Driver Pavlikov (as N. Pavlikov)
- Aleksey Gribov as Tank Corps Commander Gorbunov (as A. Gribov)
- Vladimir Sladkopevtsev as Terentii Zhukov

== Film crew ==
- Written by: Alexander Zarkhi, Iosif Kheifits
- Directed by:
  - Alexander Zarkhi
  - Iosif Kheifets
- Sorezhisser: Michael Shapiro
- Producer: Michael Kaplan
- Artist: Anatoly Bosulaev
- Composer: Valery Zhelobinsky
- Sound: Arnold Shargorodskii
