= Mother (1955 film) =

1955 film

Mother 1905
- Film poster
- Мать (Mat)
- Directed by: Mark Donskoy
- Written by: Mark Donskoy; Maxim Gorky; Nikolai Kovarsky
- Produced by: Mark Donskoy; Aleksandr Kozyr
- Starring: Vera Maretskaya; Aleksey Batalov; Tatyana Piletskaya
- Cinematography: Oleksiy Mishurin
- Edited by: N. Gorbenko
- Music by: Lev Shvarts
- Production company: Kiev Film Studio
- Release date: 1955
- Running time: 104 minutes
- Country: Soviet Union
- Language: Russian

Mother (Russian: Мать, translit. Mat, also released as 1905) is a 1955 Soviet drama film directed by Mark Donskoy and based on the 1906 eponymous novel by Maxim Gorky. It was entered into the 1956 Cannes Film Festival.

== Plot ==
In 1905, in Nizhny Novgorod, Vlassov and his son Pavel are workers in a large factory, where they, like many others, are exploited. Vlassov succumbs to alcoholism, leaving Pavel to confront the harsh realities of their lives. Pavel becomes aware of the widespread misery and begins to organize workers, encouraging them to rise up against their oppressors.

Initially submissive and hesitant, Pavel's mother gradually adopts her son's revolutionary ideals. She struggles internally but learns to read to better understand the movement. She becomes actively involved, distributing revolutionary pamphlets during the preparation of a strike.

Despite Pavel's repeated arrests, imprisonments, and eventual sentencing to forced labor and exile in Siberia, his mother continues his work. Her transformation leads her to realize that only revolution can bring justice to the oppressed.

== Cast ==
- Vera Maretskaya as Pelagea Nilovna Vlassovna, the mother
- Aleksey Batalov as Pavel Vlassov
- Tatyana Piletskaya as Sasha
- Andrei Petrov as Andrei Nakhodka
- Sergei Kurilov as Nikolai Ivanovich
- Liliya Gritsenko as Sophia Ivanovna
- Pavel Usovnichenko as Rybin
- Pavel Volkov as Nikolai Suzov
- Nikifor Kolofidin as Mr. Vlassov
- Ivan Neganov (as I. Neganov) as Agent
- Vladimir Marenkov as Vesoshukov
