= Peat-Bog Soldiers =

1938 Soviet film

- Болотные солдаты
- Directed by: Aleksandr Macheret
- Written by: Aleksandr Macheret; Yury Olesha
- Starring: Oleg Zhakov; Vasili Vanin; Aleksey Konsovsky; Alexey Gribov
- Music by: Lev Shvarts
- Release date: 1938
- Running time: 69 minutes
- Country: Soviet Union
- Language: Russian

Peat-Bog Soldiers (Болотные солдаты) is a 1938 Soviet drama film directed by Aleksandr Macheret and written by Yury Olesha.

== Plot ==
The National Socialists send a German underground worker to a concentration camp. With the help of his friends, he decides to flee from there.

== Cast ==
- Oleg Zhakov as Paul
- S. Shirokova as Marie
- Ivan Kudryavtsev as Tiedemann
- Aleksandr Zrazhevsky as Bischoff
- Vasili Vanin as The Camp Commander
- S. Muratov as Oswald
- Boris Pyasetsky as Belz
- Aleksey Konsovsky as Franz Müller
- Igor Doronin as Robert
- Alexey Gribov as Schultz
- Ivan Koval-Samborsky as Walter
- Andrei Fayt as Garms
