= Asya (film) =

- Russian: Ася
- Directed by: Iosif Kheifits
- Written by: Iosif Kheifits; Ivan Turgenev
- Starring: Elena Koreneva; Igor Kostolevsky; Vyacheslav Yezepov
- Cinematography: Genrikh Marandzhyan
- Edited by: Raisa Izakson
- Music by: Oleg Karavaychuk
- Production company: Lenfilm
- Release date: 1977
- Running time: 98 min.
- Country: Soviet Union
- Language: Russian

Asya (Russian: Ася) is a 1977 Soviet romantic drama film directed by Iosif Kheifits. It is an adaptation of the 1857 novella Asya by Ivan Turgenev.

== Plot ==
The film is set on the banks of the Rhine. The protagonist N.N. is a strange girl named Asya, who has an extraordinary power of love.

== Cast ==
- Elena Koreneva as Asya
- Igor Kostolevsky as Gagin
- Vyacheslav Yezepov as N.N.
- Gertrud Brendler as episode
- Kirill Gun as cashier at the shipping company
- Yuri Medvedev as russian man in a German restaurant

== Production ==
Andrei Mironov auditioned for the role of Gagin.

== Awards ==
Prizes for Best Actress (Elena Koreneva) Locarno International Film Festival (Switzerland, 1976), at the Taormina Film Fest (Italy, 1978), and International Film Festival in Cobourg (France, 1977).
