= Tatiana Okunevskaya =

Soviet and Russian actress

- Татьяна Окуневская
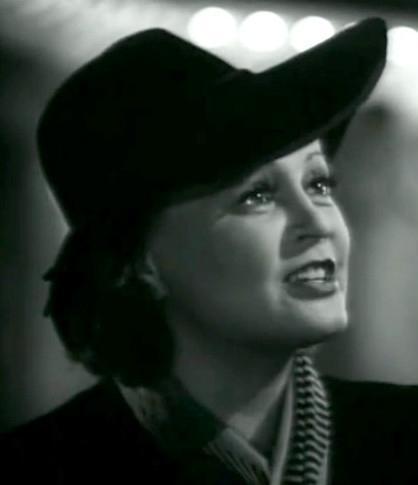
- Okunevskaya in 1947
- Born: 3 March 1914; Zavidovo, Moscow Governorate, Russian Empire
- Died: 15 May 2002 (aged 88); Moscow, Russia
- Occupation: Actress

Tatiana Kirillovna Okunevskaya (Russian: Татьяна Кирилловна Окуневская; 3 March 1914 – 15 May 2002) was a Soviet and Russian actress.

== Life ==
Tatiana Okunevskaya was born on 3 March 1914 in Zavidovo, Moscow Governorate. She was active in Soviet film and theatre from 1933 to 1948, whereupon she was raped by Lavrentiy Beria at his residence, arrested for alleged anti-state agitation and propaganda, and sentenced to ten years labour at Steplag. Beria picked her up under the pretense of bringing her to perform for the Politburo. Instead, he took her to his dacha where he offered to free her father and grandmother from NKVD prison if she submitted. He then raped her telling her "scream or not, it doesn't matter." Beria already knew her relatives had been executed months earlier. Okunevskaya was arrested shortly after the assault and sentenced to solitary confinement in the Gulag, which she survived.

Following her release in 1954, she returned to the theatre, where she worked until 1959. From 1959 to 1979, she worked as an artist for Gosconcert (the Soviet State Concert Company) and Mosconcert (its Moscow equivalent). Her previously robust health declined rapidly due to complications from surgery in 2000, ending in her death in Moscow in 2002 at the age of 88.

== Selected filmography ==
- Hectic Days (1935)
- It Happened in the Donbas (1945)
- Boy from the Outskirts (1947)
- The Captivating Star of Happiness (1975)
- Resident Return (1982)
- House for the Rich (2000)
