= Sofiya Magarill =

Soviet actress

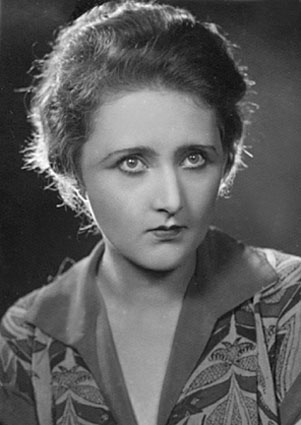
Sofia Magarill

Sofiya Zinovevna Magarill (Russian - Со́фья Зино́вьевна Магари́лл; 5 April 1900 – 15 October 1943 in Alma-Ata) was a Soviet film actress.

== Life ==
Sofia Magarill studied at the A. Morozov Theater Studio, and in the FEKS workshop under the direction of G. Kozintsev and L. Trauberg, she graduated in 1925. Magarill began her career in cinema in 1924. From 1933 to 1936, she completed an acting school at Lenfilm under the direction of Boris Zon. She worked in the Leningrad New Theater. From 1941 she was an actress of TSOKS - Central United Film Studio, which operated in Alma-Ata, Kazakh SSR (now Almaty, Kazakhstan), from 1941 to 1944, where she died October 15, 1943, from typhus.

== Filmography ==
- The Club of the Big Deed (1927)
- Kastus Kalinovskiy (1928)
- The New Babylon (1929)
- Cities and Years (1930)
- Lieutenant Kijé (1934)
- Masquerade (1941)
- The Murderers are Coming (1942)
