= Nikolai Manoshin =

Soviet footballer and coach (1938–2022)

Personal information
- Full name: Nikolai Alekseyevich Manoshin
- Date of birth: 6 March 1938
- Place of birth: Moscow, Russian SFSR, USSR
- Date of death: 10 February 2022 (aged 83)
- Position: Midfielder

Youth career
- FShM Moscow

Senior career*
Years	Team	Apps	(Gls)
1956–1962	Torpedo Moscow	91	(4)
1963–1966	CSKA Moscow	82	(0)
Total		173	(4)

International career
1960–1961	USSR	8	(0)

Managerial career
- 1967–1969: CSKA Moscow (assistant)
- 1970: SKA Kyiv
- 1973: CSKA Moscow (assistant)
- 1975: CSKA Moscow (assistant)
- 1976: CSKA Moscow (director)
- 1977: ?, Somalia
- 1978–1980: ?, Yemen
- 1981: CSKA Moscow (director)
- 1988–1991: ?, Mali
- * Club domestic league appearances and goals

Nikolai Alekseyevich Manoshin (Russian: Николай Алексеевич Маношин; 6 March 1938 – 10 February 2022) was a Russian football player and coach.

== International career ==
Manoshin made his debut for USSR on 17 August 1960 in a friendly against East Germany. He was selected for the 1962 FIFA World Cup squad, but did not play in any games at the tournament.

== Personal ==
Wife: Galina Dashevskaya

He died on 10 February 2022, at the age of 83.

== Honours ==
Torpedo Moscow

- Soviet Top League: 1960
- Soviet Cup: 1960

Individual

- Top 33 players year-end list: 1960, 1961, 1962
