= About Love (1970 film) =

1970 film

- Russian: О любви
- Directed by: Mikhail Bogin
- Written by: Mikhail Bogin; Yuri Chulyukin; Yuri Klepikov
- Produced by: David Prober
- Starring: Victoria Fyodorova; Sergey Dreyden; Eleonora Shashkova; Vladimir Tikhonov; Oleg Yankovsky; Valentin Gaft
- Cinematography: Vladimir Chumak
- Edited by: Lyudmila Butuzova
- Music by: Yevgeny Krylatov
- Production company: Gorky Film Studio
- Release date: 1970
- Running time: 72 min.
- Country: Soviet Union
- Language: Russian

About Love (Russian: О любви, romanized: O lyubvi) is a 1970 Soviet romantic drama film directed by Mikhail Bogin.

== Plot ==
Thirty-year-old Galina, smart, charming, and beautiful, works as a restorer at the Catherine Palace in Leningrad, immersing herself fully in her craft. Though she seems made for love, true feelings have eluded her. Hoping to help her find companionship, her friend Vera introduces her to her husband’s colleagues: Mitya Velikhov, a young, talented engineer who quickly becomes captivated by Galina, and Andrei, a quiet, enigmatic man who captures her heart.

While Mitya pursues Galina with genuine intentions, spending time with her and their friends, she finds herself drawn to Andrei. Their fleeting encounters leave her unsure of his feelings, and she is hesitant to reveal her own—especially as Andrei is married. Galina throws herself into her work, and despite briefly connecting with Mitya, she ultimately declines his marriage proposal, feeling unable to settle for anything less than her elusive, deeper love. But there is no real feeling and no.

== Cast ==
- Victoria Fyodorova as Galya
- Sergey Dreyden as Mitya
- Eleonora Shashkova as Vera
- Vladimir Tikhonov as Petya
- Oleg Yankovsky as Andrei
- Valentin Gaft as Nikolai
- Stanislav Churkin as Little engineer
- Nina Mamaeva as Polina Ivanovna
- Elena Solovey as Rita
- Eleonora Aleksandrova as Nina
- Bibi Andersson as Nikolai's girlfriend
- Lyudmila Arinina as episode

== History of Creation ==
The real prototype of the main character is the sculptor-restorer Liliya Mikhailovna Shvetskaya.
