= Anatoly Smiranin =

Russian actor (1892-1971)

- Born: Anatoly Smiranin; 24 December 1892
- Died: 15 February 1971 (aged 78)
- Occupation: Actor
- Years active: 1918–1966

Anatoly Dimitrievich Smiranin (Russian: Анатолий Дмитриевич Смиранин; 24 December 1892 – 15 February 1971) was a Soviet actor. He was awarded the title People's Artist of the Georgian SSR in 1946.

== Selected filmography ==
- 1944 — The Last Hill
- 1946 — Robinson Crusoe (1947 film)
- 1961 — Amphibian Man
- 1966 — The Game Without Draw
