= Vasili Vanin =

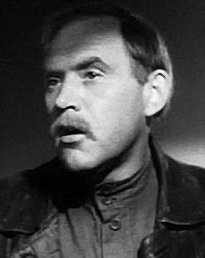
- Born: Vasili Vasilyevich Vanin; 13 January 1898; Tambov, Russian Empire
- Died: 12 May 1951 (aged 53); Moscow, Soviet Union
- Resting place: Novodevichy Cemetery
- Occupation(s): Actor, theater director, pedagogue
- Awards: People's Artist of the USSR

Vasili Vasilyevich Vanin (Russian: Васи́лий Васи́льевич Ва́нин; 13 January 1898 – 12 May 1951) was a Soviet and Russian stage and film actor, theatre director and pedagogue. He was given the award People's Artist of the USSR in 1949.

== Biography ==
Vasili Vanin was born on 13 January 1898 in Tambov, in the family of a small railway employee. Having lost his father early, in 1906 he was assigned to an orphanage/ Between 1924 and 1950 he was actor and director in the Mossovet Theatre; from 1950 the leader of the Moscow Pushkin Drama Theatre.

== Filmography ==
- Tommy (1931)
- The Return of Maxim (1937)
- Lenin in October (1937)
- Peat-Bog Soldiers (1938)
- Lenin in 1918 (1939)
- Member of the Government (1939)
- Valery Chkalov (1941)
- Kotovsky (1942)
- The District Secretary (1942) – Stalin Prizes second degree (1943)
- The Front (1943)
- The Liberated Earth (1946)
- Light over Russia (1947)
- The Precious Seed (1948)

== Honors and awards ==
- Honored Artist of the RSFSR (1933)
- People's Artist of the RSFSR (1947)
- People's Artist of the USSR (1949)
- Three Stalin Prizes second degree (1943, 1846, 1949)

== Bibliography ==
- Christie, Ian / Taylor, Richard. The Film Factory: Russian and Soviet Cinema in Documents 1896-1939. Routledge, 2012.
