= Viktor Koval =

Russian writer and actor (1947–2021)

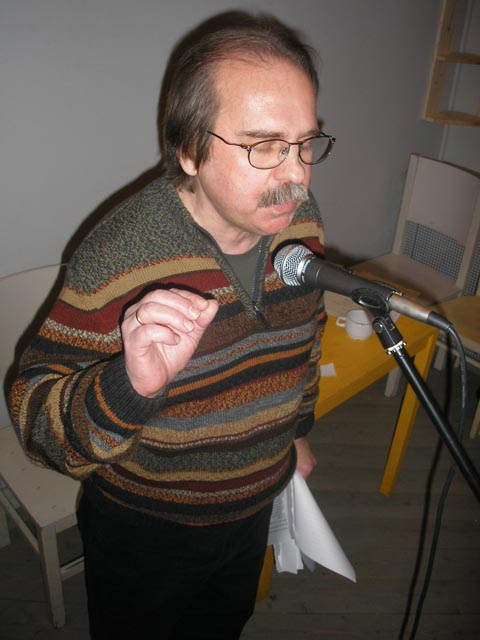
- Koval in 2007. Photo of poet Igor Sid.
- Born: Viktor Stanislavovich Koval; 29 September 1947; Moscow, Russian SFSR
- Died: 1 February 2021 (aged 73); Moscow, Russia
- Occupations: Writer; Actor

Viktor Stanislavovich Koval (Russian: Виктор Станиславович Коваль; 29 September 1947 – 1 February 2021) was a Russian-Soviet writer, poet, artist, and actor.

== Biography ==
Koval was born into a family of servicemen. A child actor, he appeared in a number of films from 1955 to 1961. He attended the Moscow Polygraphic Institute in the school of arts, and subsequently drew illustrations for books, magazines, and newspapers. He became a well-known poet in the 1970s, and participated in poetry festivals in Yaroslavl, Volgograd, London, Gothenburg, Milan, and so on. He was a member of the Union of Artists of Russia and Writers' Union of Moscow. In 2007, he received the Golden Calf Award, given by the Literaturnaya Gazeta.

Viktor Koval died of COVID-19 in Moscow, on 1 February 2021, at the age of 73, during the COVID-19 pandemic in Russia.

== Filmography ==
- Vasyok Trubachyov and His Comrades (1955)
- The Rumyantsev Case (1955)
- Khrabryy zayats (1955)
- An Unusual Summer (1956)
- Pod zolotym orlom (1957)
- Druzok (1958)
- Ljubuška (1961)
