= Kira Golovko =

Soviet and Russian actress

Kira Golovko PAR
- Born: Kira Nikolaevna Ivanova (Russian: Кира Николаевна Иванова); 11 March 1919; Yessentuki, Russian SFSR
- Died: 16 August 2017 (aged 98); Moscow, Russia
- Occupations: actress theatre teacher
- Years active: 1946–2007
- Spouse: Arseniy Golovko (deceased)
- Children: Natalia; Mikhail
- Awards: People's Artist of Russia

Kira Golovko, née Ivanova (11 March 1919 – 16 August 2017) was a Soviet and Russian theater and film actress, winner of the Stalin Prize (1947) and People's Artist of the RSFSR (1957).

== Life and career ==
Ivanova was born in Yessentuki, the great-niece of the poet Vyacheslav Ivanov. In 1937, she entered the Moscow Institute of Philosophy, Literature and Art to study Russian literature. In 1938 she was accepted into the auxiliary of the troupe of the Gorky Moscow Art Theatre. In 1957 she returned to the Moscow Art Theater, where she served until 1985. From 1958 to 2007, she taught at the Moscow Art Theater School. Her students included Natalia Yegorova, Boris Nevzorov, and Nikolai Karachentsov. She died on August 16, 2017, age 98. She was the widow of Soviet Admiral Arseniy Golovko, who served as Soviet Commander of the Red Banner Northern Fleet during World War II.

== Filmography ==
Year	Title	Role	Notes
1946	The Great Glinka	Anna Kern	
1947	Light over Russia	Masha Zabelina	
1948	First-Year Student	Nina Vasilyevna	
1952	The Lower Depths	Natasha	
1964	The Chairman	Nadezhda Petrovna	
1965; 1966; 1967	War and Peace	Countess Rostova	part 1-5
1968	Sofiya Perovskaya	Perovskaya's mother	
1969	Golfstrim	Yekaterina Nikolayevna	
1970	Payback	registry office employee	
1971	And There Was Evening, and There Was Morning ...	Berseneva	
1973	The Tracer	episode	
1974	And on the Pacific Ocean...	Nadezhda Lvovna	
1975	Unforgotten Song	Ganna Maksimovna	
1977	Own Opinion	episode	
1979	Faithfully and Truthfully	Vladislav Minchenko's mother	
1981	My Eternal Love	Olga Zubova	
1984	The Lonely Merchant's Win	mother	
1986	Boris Godunov	Ksenia's mother	
1987	The Confrontation	neighbour	(final fim role)
