= Courage (1939 film) =

- Russian: Мужество
- Directed by: Mikhail Kalatozov
- Starring: Aleksey Bondi; Dmitri Dudnikov; Zula Nakhashkiyev; Konstantin Sorokin; Oleg Zhakov
- Production company: Lenfilm
- Release date: 1939
- Country: Soviet Union
- Language: Russian

Courage (Russian: Мужество, romanized: Muzhestvo) is a 1939 Soviet adventure film directed by Mikhail Kalatozov.

== Plot ==
The film tells about the pilot of the civil air fleet Aleksey Tomilin, who suddenly decides from now on to avoid extreme situations and fly only in a straight line, but everything changes drastically when a saboteur sits next to him.

== Cast ==
- Oleg Zhakov as Aleksey Tomilin - pilot
- Dmitry Dudnikov as Mustafa Khadzhi - Japanese army spy
- Konstantin Sorokin as Vlasov - pilot
- Aleksey Bondi as Squadron leader
- Aleksandr Benyaminov as Yusuf - barman
- Fyodor Fedorovsky as Captain Bystrov
- Pyotr Nikashin as Kostya Kuzmin - flight engineer
- Zula Nakhashkiyev as Dugar
- Tamara Nagayeva as Faizi - pilot
- Nikolai Urvantsev as Dispatcher (uncredited)
