= The Last Hill =

- Russian: Малахов курган
- Directed by: Iosif Kheifits; Aleksandr Zarkhi
- Written by: Iosif Kheifits; Boris Voytekhov; Aleksandr Zarkhi
- Starring: Nikolay Kryuchkov; Boris Andreyev; Akaki Khorava; Maria Pastukhova; Fyodor Ishchenko
- Cinematography: Arkadi Koltsaty
- Music by: Andrei Balanchivadze
- Release date: 1944
- Country: Soviet Union

The Last Hill, (Russian: Малахов курган) is a 1944 Soviet World War II film directed by Iosif Kheifits and Aleksandr Zarkhi.

== Plot ==
The film tells about five sailors fighting on Malakhov Kurgan for Sevastopol.

== Cast ==
- Nikolay Kryuchkov as Cmdr. Boris Likhachyov
- Boris Andreyev as Maj. Zhukovskiy
- Akaki Khorava as Vice-Admiral (as A. Khorava)
- Maria Pastukhova as Mariya Perventsova (as M. Pastukhova)
- Fyodor Ishchenko as Sailor (as F. Ishchenko)
- Nikolay Gorlov as Sailor (as N. Gorlov)
- Yevgeni Perov as Sailor (as E. Perov)
- Igor Tkachuk as Sailor (as I. Tkachuk)
- Zura Lejava as Sailor (as Z. Lezhava)
- Nikolai Dorokhin as Sgt. Sizov (as N. Dorokhin)
- Anatoly Smiranin as Narrator (voice) (as A. Smiranin)
