= Member of the Government =

- Russian: Член правительства
- Directed by: Iosif Kheifits; Aleksandr Zarkhi
- Written by: Ekaterina Vinogradskaya
- Produced by: M. Chernova; Iosif Kheifits; S. Reitman; Aleksandr Zarkhi
- Starring: Vera Maretskaya; Vasili Vanin; Nikolay Kryuchkov; Ivan Nazarov; Valentina Telegina
- Cinematography: Aleksandr Gintsburg
- Edited by: Ye. Bazhenova
- Music by: Nikolai Timofeyev
- Production company: Lenfilm
- Release date: 1939
- Running time: 106 min.
- Country: Soviet Union
- Language: Russian

Member of the Government (Russian: Член правительства, romanized: Chlen pravitelstva) is a 1939 Soviet drama film directed by Iosif Kheifits and Aleksandr Zarkhi.

== Plot ==
Aleksandra Sokolova, the wife of a peasant and a former farm laborer who becomes a deputy of the Supreme Soviet of the Soviet Union, overcoming collectivization problems and difficulties in her personal life.

== Cast ==
- Vera Maretskaya as Aleksandra Grigoryevna Sokolova
- Vasili Vanin as Yefim Yefimovich Sokolov
- Nikolay Kryuchkov as Nikita Sokolov, blond brother-in-law
- Ivan Nazarov as Fedot Petrovich Krivosheyev
- Valentina Telegina as Panya, fat woman
- Boris Blinov as The District Party Secretary
- Vasili Merkuryev as Party Undersecretary Stashkov
- Aleksey Konsovsky as Petka, teen groom
- Aleksandra Matveeva as Duska, teen bride
- Konstantin Sorokin as Kuzma, beefy kolkhoz rowdy
- Yelizaveta Uvarova as Duska's mother
- Aleksandr Melnikov as Escort (uncredited)

== Awards and nominations ==
- New York Film Critics Circle Awards — Best Foreign Language Film (nom)
