= Don Diego and Pelagia =

1928 film

- Directed by: Yakov Protazanov
- Written by: Vasili Lokot
- Cinematography: Yevgeni Alekseyev
- Production company: Mezhrabpomfilm
- Release date: 24 February 1928
- Country: Soviet Union
- Languages: Silent; Russian intertitles

Don Diego and Pelagia (Russian: Дон Диего и Пелагея, romanized: Don Diego i Pelageya) is a 1928 Soviet silent comedy drama directed by Yakov Protazanov.

The film's art direction was by Sergei Kozlovsky.

== Plot ==
Stationmaster Yakov Ivanovich Golovach identifies with the knightly protagonist of a historical novel, 'Don Diego' One day, he is caught in the act by the female residents of nearby villages who have come to the station to meet the arriving mail train and sell their foodstuffs. Their laughter at his antics embarrasses and enrages him.

In a fit of anger, Yakov Ivanovich decides to enforce railway rules strictly, targeting violators who cross the tracks illegally. He manages to detain only an elderly peasant woman, 80-year-old Pelageya Dyomina, who is slow to avoid him.Yakov files a complaint against her. During the trial, he argues that her actions risked derailing a train or a robbery at the station. This results in Pelageya being sentenced to three months in prison.

Pelageya's husband seeks assistance from local figures, including a priest and a visiting member of the Society for the Study of Rural Life, but is unsuccessful.

The local Komsomol secures a review of the case, resulting in Pelageya's release. The couple subsequently joins the organization.

== Cast ==
- Mariya Blyumental-Tamarina as Pelageya Diomina
- Anatoliy Bykov as 'Don Diego', station master
- Vladimir Mikhaylov as Pelageya's husband
- I. Levkoyeva as Natasha, member Komsomol
- Ivan Yudin as Misha, cell secretary Komsomol
- Vladimir Popov as Miroshka, guard Volispolkom
- Daniil Vvedenskiy as Night watcher
- Aleksandr Gromov as Uchraspred
- Mikhail Zharov as himself
- B. Gusiev as Militia man
- Yelena Tyapkina as Pope's Wife
- Ivan Pelttser as Bureaucrat
- Sergei Tsenin as Bureaucrat
- Osip Brik as Bureaucrat
- Nikolay Ivakin as Cooperative Shop Employee
- Lev Fenin as Postman's Guest
- Vera Maretskaya as Girl in trial
- Sofya Levitina as Woman in Jail
- Andrei Gorchilin
- Chuveliov

== Bibliography ==
- Christie, Ian & Taylor, Richard. The Film Factory: Russian and Soviet Cinema in Documents 1896-1939. Routledge, 2012.
