= First-Year Student =

- Russian: Первоклассница
- Directed by: Ilya Frez
- Written by: Evgeniy Shvarts
- Starring: Natalya Zashchipina; Tamara Makarova; Tatyana Barysheva; Kira Golovko; Igor Iroschkin; Katya Ivanova; Yelena Yegorova
- Cinematography: Gavriil Egiazarov
- Edited by: A. Soboleva
- Music by: Dmitri Kabalevsky; Michail Siw
- Release date: 1948
- Country: Soviet Union

First-Year Student (Russian: Первоклассница) is a 1948 Soviet children's film directed by Ilya Frez.

== Plot ==
The film tells about a girl named Marusya Orlova, who went to school. A teacher and new friends will help her to become a disciplined, sociable and sympathetic person.

== Cast ==
- Natalya Zashchipina as Marusja (as Natasha Zashchipina)
- Tamara Makarova as Teacher
- Tatyana Barysheva as Grandmother
- Kira Golovko
- Igor Iroschkin as Seresha
- Katya Ivanova as Mother
- Yelena Yegorova
