= The Rumyantsev Case =

- Directed by: Iosif Kheifits
- Written by: Yury German; Iosif Kheyfits
- Starring: Aleksey Batalov; Ninel Podgornaya; Sergey Lukyanov; Nikolai Kryuchkov
- Cinematography: Lev Sokolsky; Moses Magid
- Music by: Venedict Pushkov
- Production company: Lenfilm
- Release date: March 8, 1956
- Running time: 97 minutes
- Country: Soviet Union
- Language: Russian

The Rumyantsev Case (Russian: Дело Румянцева, romanized: Delo Rumyantseva) is a 1956 Soviet crime drama film directed by Iosif Kheyfits.

== Plot ==
Young truck-driver Sasha Rumyantsev, trying to avoid running over a child, has an accident, his car crashes into a brick wall. Rumyantsev receives minor injuries, but his occasional passenger, a girl named Klavdya, is injured more seriously. Rumyantsev faces prosecution, but the investigator finds out the real reason of the accident and finds Rumyatsev innocent.

Sasha and Klavdya fall in love with each other, they are ready for living together and plan a wedding, but Rumyantsev falls into trouble again ... Rumyantsev's chief Korol'kov, scoundrel and drunkard, draws Sasha into his illegal enterprise. Because of Korol'kov, Rumyantsev becomes an accomplice in theft: he carries stolen goods in his truck. Rumyantsev is arrested, the police captain who investigates the case is unconditionally sure that the driver is guilty. However, the experienced сolonel Afanasyev believes Rumyantsev and exposes the real criminals.

== Production ==
- Production design by Isaak Kaplan, Berta Manevich
- Set decoration by Yu. Freydlin
- Makeup department by V. Sokolov

== Cast ==
- Aleksey Batalov as Sasha Rumyantsev, truck-driver
- Ninel Podgornaya as Klavdya Naumenko, the student, Rumyantsev's bride
- Sergey Lukyanov as Sergey I. Afanasyev, police colonel
- Pyotr Lobanov as Samokhin, a police captain, inspector of OBKhSS
- Gennadi Yukhtin as Paul Evdokimov, truck-driver, Rumyantsev's friend
- Vladimir Lepko as Vasily Lemekhov, truck-driver
- Yevgeny Leonov as Mikhail Snegirev, truck-driver
- Inna Makarova as Nonna Snegireva, Mikhail Snegirev's wife
- Nikolay Kryuchkov as Korol'kov, chief of operations department
- Viktor Chekmaryov as Shmyglo, a repeat offender, the ringleader of a gang of plunderers
- Ants Eskola as Prus, director of the shop, plunderer
- Arkady Trusov as Yakov Egorovich, truck-driver, Rumyantsev's eldest friend
- Ivan Selyanin as Vassily Stepanovich, truck-driver, Rumyantsev's eldest friend
- Lyudmila Golubeva as Lyuba, the student, Claudia's friend
- Yevgeny Losakevich as Zoya Pavlovna, Claudia's aunt
- Viktor Koval as Sasha, orphan, an adopted Paul Evdokimov
