= Kastus Kalinovskiy (film) =

1928 film

- Original film poster
- Directed by: Vladimir Gardin
- Starring: Nikolai Simonov; V. Plotnikov; Kondrat Yakovlev
- Cinematography: Naum Aptekman; A. Akmolinsky
- Production company: Belgoskino
- Release date: 1928
- Running time: 72 minutes
- Country: Soviet Union
- Languages: Silent; Russian intertitles

Kastus Kalinovskiy (Russian: Кастусь Калиновский) is a 1928 Soviet silent historical drama film directed by Vladimir Gardin. It portrays the nineteenth century revolutionary Konstanty Kalinowski.

== Plot ==
Uprisings start in the western provinces of the Russian Empire. Peasants seize carts loaded with bread. Magnates and the gentry support them, seeking to get leadership and a union with Poland. Count Wielkopolski becomes leader of nobility. One of his units is commanded by his son, Stanislav (a.k.a. "Stas"). Russian landowner Count Orlov mercilessly exploits his serfs. Yas Rudenok sends his sister, Maryla, to Kastus Kalinovskiy, the leader of rebellious peasants, to ask for help.

By order of the Military Governor-General Count Muravyov to "pacify the region" the Cossacks are sent. Stanislaw Wielkopolski's squad of Polish Confederates fight with them, but at the same time robs the peasants. Yasya tries to resist, but is beaten. Kalinovskiy shows up with a detachment and tells Stas, with whom he got acquainted when they studied at the St. Petersburg University: "It is not with them you are at war." The sentinels report that the enemies are approaching. Stas is forced to ask for Kalinovskiy's help. Peasant groups helps break up the Cossacks and capture a fortified castle where Kalinovskiy bases his general headquarters. At the bazaar Maryla distributes leaflets and Kastus gives a speech, rousing the farmers to the cause. Both are cleverly hiding from the police. Meanwhile, Wielkopolski Sr. tries to win over the peasants on his side: he invites them to his estate, starts a conversation about land, freedom and national unity. Kalinovskiy who is present, warns them to not trust Wielkopolski Sr.; the slogan of the people is bread and land.

Kalinovskiy faces attempted capture. Stanislaw who gives chase, is taken as a prisoner by the detachment of Kalinowski. Stas' sister Jadwiga, knowing Kastus from youth, helps her brother to escape. Interests of the nobles and peasants finally diverge. Avengers of Count Muravyov shoot the participants of the uprising, and the magnates and gentry go to the Governor-General of the delegation with a petition of loyalty to the king. Wielkopolski Sr. offers even to place a military unit in his estate in order to catch Kalinowski. At this time Kastus disguised as an officer and with knowledge of the password manages to rob the royal treasury.

Muravyov declares Kalinovskiy as an outlaw. Peasant groups storm and capture Wielkopolski's castle. In a duel Kalinowski kills Stanislaw. But the invaders are approaching. The rebels are defeated. The uprising is suppressed. Kalinowski is captured. Before the execution at the scaffold he turns to the people with his farewell speech: "Hear me, Belarus! I believe - there will be a free Belarus, for the working people, laborers and peasants!" "We hear you!"- is the response.

== Cast ==
- Nikolai Simonov as Kastus Kalinovskiy
- V. Plotnikov as Wielkopolski
- Kondrat Yakovlev as Mikhail Muravyov-Vilensky
- Aleksei Feona as Bishop Skublinski
- Grigoriy Ge as Archbishop Krasinski
- Konstantin Khokhlov as Count Orlov
- Nikolai Komissarov as Yas Rudenok
- Boris Livanov as Stanislav Skrirmunt
- Vladimir Vladomirskiy as Cossack Yesaul
- Sofiya Magarill as Yadviga
- Gennadiy Michurin as Danzas
- Pavel Samoylov as Fool for Christ
- Adam Terekh as Military Prosecutor
- Florian Zhdanovich as Priest at the Execution
- Boris Platonov as Young Gypsy at the Market
- Konstantin Karenin

== Bibliography ==
- Klossner, Michael. The Europe of 1500-1815 on Film and Television: A Worldwide Filmography of Over 2550 Works, 1895 Through 2000. McFarland & Company, 2002.
- Igor Avdeev, Larisa Zaitseva All Belarus Films: Catalog-Handbook. Feature films (1926—1970). — Minsk: Belaruskaya navuka, 2001. — Volume 1. — 240 pages. — ISBN 985-08-0023-2
