= Wind in the Face =

1930 film

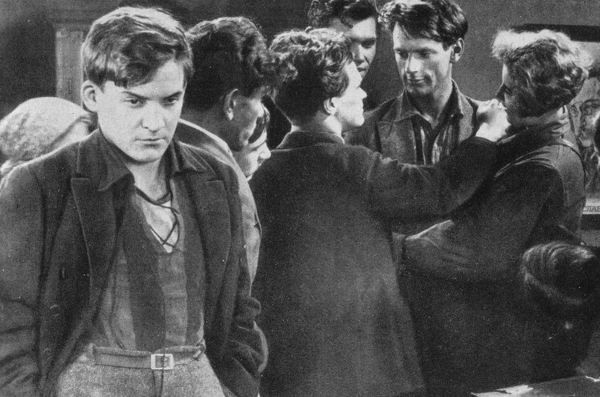
- A scene from Wind in the Face (1930)
- Russian: Ветер в лицо
- Directed by: Iosif Kheifits; Aleksandr Zarkhi
- Written by: Iosif Berkhin; Nikolay Lvov; Nikolai Shpikovsky
- Starring: Zoya Gleizarova; Aleksandr Melnikov; Oleg Zhakov
- Cinematography: Mikhail Kaplan; Hecho Nazarjants
- Release date: 1930
- Running time: 80 minutes
- Country: Soviet Union
- Language: Russian

Wind in the Face (Russian: Ветер в лицо, romanized: Veter v litso) is a 1930 Soviet drama film directed by Iosif Kheifits and Aleksandr Zarkhi.

== Plot ==
The film tells about a group of Komsomol members who, in the early 1920s, remake the beer hall under the communal hostel. The organizer of the commune Boris together with his wife Nina leads a child and move to the apartment of the parents of the spouse, but they become very uncomfortable there and Boris moves back to the commune. Their city is under threat of flooding. Will the Komsomols save the factory's assets?

== Cast ==
- Aleksandr Melnikov as Valerian
- Oleg Zhakov as Boris
- Zoya Gleizarova as Nina
- Aleksandr Melnikov

== Bibliography ==
- Irina Graschenkova. https://books.google.com/books?id=KQMSDgAAQBAJ&pg=PT394 Cinema anthropology XX / 20]: Man, 2014. ISBN 9785906131492
