= Looking for a Person =

- Russian: Ищу человека
- Directed by: Mikhail Bogin
- Written by: Agniya Barto
- Produced by: Alexander Budkevich
- Starring: Oleg Zhakov; Rimma Manukovskaya; Eleonora Aleksandrova
- Cinematography: Sergey Filippov
- Edited by: Maria Rodionova
- Music by: Yevgeny Krylatov
- Production company: Gorky Film Studio
- Release date: 3 August 1973
- Running time: 97 min.
- Country: Soviet Union
- Language: Russian

Looking for a Person (Russian: Ищу человека, romanized: Ishchu cheloveka) is a 1973 Soviet drama film directed by Mikhail Bogin.

The film is based on true stories about separation and meetings, about the search for loved ones, which continued many years after the Second World War.

== Plot ==
Set in the 1970s across Leningrad, Moscow, Klin, and Uzbekistan, the film follows people separated from loved ones during World War II who are now trying to reunite with them years later. At its center is Ivan Grigoryevich, a radio host (played by Oleg Zhakov) dedicated to helping people find missing family members through a national radio program. Having lost his entire family in 1942, Ivan, now retired, volunteers his time at the radio station, immersing himself in the hopes and struggles of others also seeking reconnection. The film presents multiple search stories, some successful, some disappointing, often relying on nothing more than faint childhood memories as clues.

One central storyline is that of Valentina Rudakova (played by Rimma Manukovskaya), who has been searching for her daughter Alla, whom she lost during the war. Valentina’s story weaves throughout the film as she meets several women who could potentially be her daughter. Despite repeated heartbreak and Ivan’s suggestion to end her search, Valentina remains determined. In the end, she forms a bond with Alla Kuznetsova (played by Liya Akhedzhakova), choosing to stay with her, even though she realizes that this Alla is not her biological child.

== Cast ==
- Oleg Zhakov as Ivan Grigorievich
- Rimma Manukovskaya as Valentina Dmitrievna Rudakova
- Eleonora Aleksandrova as Nina Lykova
- Lyudmila Antonyuk as Nina's mother
- Gennadiy Yalovich as Nina's brother
- Liya Akhedzhakova as Alla Kuznetsova
- Mikhail Asafov as Velekhov
- Sergey Dreyden as architect
- Natalya Gundareva as Klava
- Lyudmila Ivanova as switchman
- Valentin Nikulin as a visitor to the bath
- Raisa Ryazanova as weaver
