= Galina Dashevskaya =

Soviet and Russian film and stage actress

Galina Samuilovna Dashevskaya (Russian: Галина Самуиловна Дашевская) (May 8, 1941-June 18, 2020) was a Soviet and Russian film and stage (Mossovet Theatre) actress.

Husband: Nikolai Manoshin.

== Awards ==
- 2002: Merited Artist of the Russian Federation
