= Yevgeny Krylatov =

Soviet and Russian composer (1934–2019)

- Евгений Крылатов
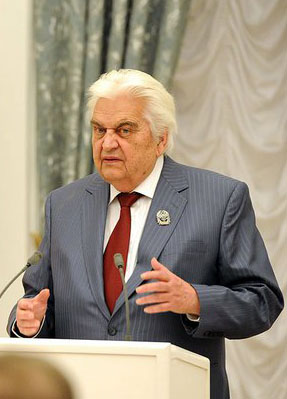
- Krylatov in 2015
- Born: Yevgeny Pavlovich Krylatov; February 23, 1934; Lysva, Soviet Union
- Died: May 8, 2019 (aged 85); Moscow, Russia
- Education: Moscow Conservatory (1953 – 1959)
- Known for: Composing music for films
- Children: Maria Krylatova

Yevgeny Pavlovich Krylatov (Russian: Евге́ний Па́влович Крыла́тов; 23 February 1934 – 8 May 2019) was a Soviet and Russian composer who wrote songs for over 120 Soviet and Russian movies and animated films.

== Biography ==
Krylatov was born on 23 February 1934 in Lysva in the working class family of Pavel Krylatov and his wife Zoya.

Krylatov graduated from Perm Music School in the Moscow Conservatory (1953–1959); having studied at once in two faculties: in the class of the composition with Professor Mikhail Chulaki and in the class of piano with Professor Vladimir Nathanson. After graduating he found himself impoverished, lacking work or a permit to reside in Moscow. He would go on to compose music for more than 150 feature and animated films.

He died in Moscow on May 8, 2019, survived by his daughter Maria.

== Filmography (selection) ==
1. 1961: Absolutely Seriously (Совершенно серьезно) with Anatoly Lepin and Nikita Bogoslovsky
2. 1968: Film, Film, Film (Фильм, фильм, фильм) with Aleksandr Zatsepin
3. 1969: Umka (Умка)
4. 1970: Umka is Looking for a Friend (Умка ищет друга)
5. 1970: About Love (О любви)
6. 1971: Oh, That Nastya! (Ох уж эта Настя!)
7. 1972: Property of the Republic (Достояние республики)
8. 1973: Looking for a Man (Ищу человека)
9. 1974: Woodpeckers Don't Get Headaches (Не болит голова у дятла)
10. 1976: The Little Mermaid (Русалочка)
11. 1978: Three from Prostokvashino (Трое из Простоквашино)
12. 1979: The Adventures of the Elektronic (Приключения Электроника)
13. 1979: Aquanauts (Акванавты)
14. 1980: Do Not Part with Your Beloved (С любимыми не расставайтесь)
15. 1982: Charodei (Чародеи)
16. 1984: Guest from the Future (Гостья из будущего), in particular, the song "The Beautiful Afar"
17. 1987: Lilac Ball (Лиловый шар)
18. 1989: Don't Leave... (Не покидай...)
19. 2011: Fairytale.Is (Сказка. Есть)

== Awards ==
Krylatov was given several awards over the course of his career:

- The People's Artist of Russia in 1994
- The Certificate of honor of the Moscow City Duma on February 18, 2004
- Given a Memorial sign on the "Square of Stars" on February 19, 2004
- Certificate of Honor of the Government of Moscow on March 3, 2009
- The Order of Honor on June 2, 2010
- an award from the president in 2015 for developments to Russian art

== Legacy ==
The documentary film "Evgeny Krylatov. The Soundtrack of the Epoch", dedicated to Krylatov's life and creativity, is directed by Oleg Karnasyuk (Ukraine, 2014).

Children's Music School No.2 in Perm was named in honour of Yevgeny Krylatov in 2018.

== Personal life ==
Krylatov was married to Sevila Sabitovna Krylova (née Karamanova; 1936–2014), a lawyer and younger sister of composer Alemdar Karamanov. Together they had two children: Pavel Krylatov (born 1958), a screenwriter, and Maria (1965–2020), a musicologist and teacher.
