= Mossovet Theatre =

Theatre in Moscow, Russia

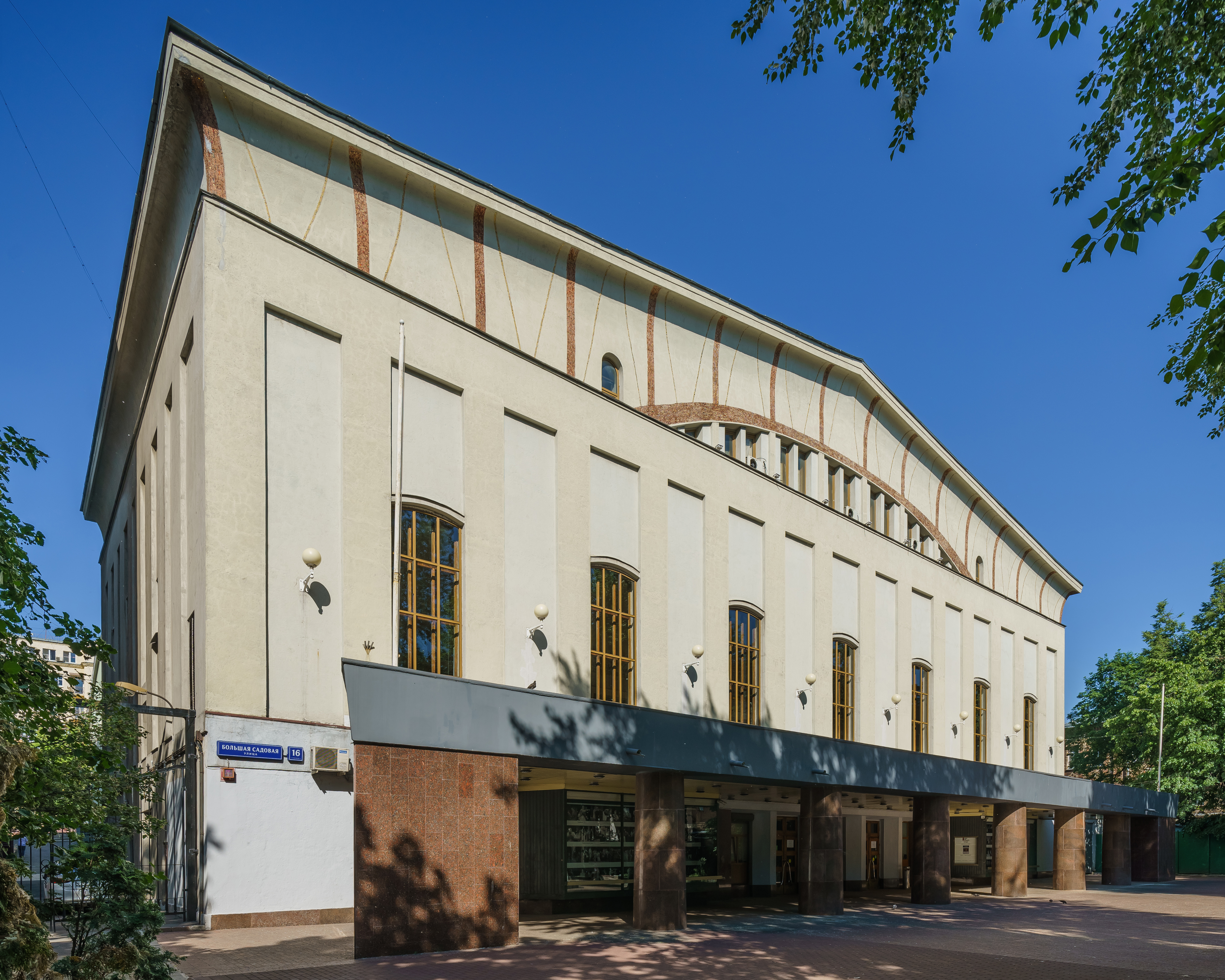
- Interactive map of Mossovet Theatre
- Address: Bolshaya Sadovaya, 16; Moscow; Russian Federation

Construction
- Opened: 1923
- Years active: 1923–present

Website
- mossovet.theatre.ru

Mossovet State Academic Theatre (Государственный академический театр имени Театр Моссовета) is one of the oldest theatres of Moscow, opened in 1923 and based at Bolshaya Sadovaya, 16.

== History ==
"Mossovet" stands for "Moscow Soviet", or "Moscow City Council".

Mossovet Theater was created in 1923 by the theatre entrepreneur S.I.Prokofiev, first as the Theater of Moscow Provincial Council of Trade Unions (MGSPS). In 1925–1940 it was led by E.O. Lyubimov-Lanskoy and in 1938 changed its name to the Theatre of Moscow City Council (Teatr Moscovskovo soveta) later to be shortened to its present form.

The theatre progressed greatly during the reign of actor and director Yury Zavadsky (the protégé of Konstantin Stanislavski) which started in 1940 and lasted up to 1977. In those years the Mossovet became home to such Soviet stage stars as Vera Maretskaya, Nikolai Mordvinov, Faina Ranevskaya, Lyubov Orlova, Rostislav Plyatt, Boris Ivanov, Georgiy Zhzhonov, Gennady Bortnikov, Mikhail Kozakov, Yury Kuzmenkov. In 1964 the theatre for its artistic achievements was given the Academic Theatre status.

With the arrival of Pavel Khomsky in the mid-1970s the Mossovet Theatre started to experiment, using several scenes: In the Foyer, the Small Scene and the (120 seats-strong) Under the Roof scene – the latter opened in 1990 with the premier of Pyotr Fomenko's Kaligula. The theatre's Main scene (894 seats) features mostly classical adaptations, along with productions of contemporary directors (Pavel Khomsky, Yuri Eremin, Andrey Konchalovsky, Nina Tchusova and others). At the present, the Mossovet troupe includes Margarita Terekhova, Sergey Yursky, Olga Ostroumova, Valentin Gaft, Alexander Domogarov, Evgeniy Steblov, Alexander Filippenko, Alexander Lenkov, Olga Kabo, Gosha Kutsenko, Evgenya Kryukova, Valery Yaryomenko, Ekaterina Guseva and Margarita Shubina, among many others.

== Troupe ==
=== Past ===
- Valeriya Dementyeva (1923–1933)
- Stepan Kuznetsov (1923–1935)
- Tatyana Pelttser (1923 – 1930, 1931 – 1934, 1938 – 1940)
- Nikolay Firsov (1923–1940)
- Boris Volkov (1924–1940)
- Yelena Shatrova (1924–1925)
- Boris Babochkin (1925–1927)
- Sergey Godzi (1926–1976)
- Tamara Oganezova (1925–1976)
- Nikolay Litvinov (1926–1930)
- Nina Knyagninskaya (1928)
- Alexander Viner (1928)
- Raisa Karelina-Raich (1933–1948)
- Nikolay Yakushenko (1934–1935)
- Vladimir Zeldin (1935–1938)
- Olga Viklandt (1935–1949)
- Nikolay Parfyonov (1935–1989)
- Arkady Vovsy (1936–1938)
- Sergey Dneprov (1936–1953)
- Pavel Geraga (1939–1968)
- Vera Maretskaya (1940–1978)
- Ivan Pelttser (1940–1946)
- Boris Olenin (1937 – 1938, 1942)
- Alexander Shatov (1938–1946)
- Nikolay Mordvinov (1940–1966)
- Boris Lavrov (1941–1978)
- Olga Yakunina (1942–1986)
- Mikhail Nazvanov (1942–1950)
- Rostislav Plyatt (1943–1989)
- Sergey Tseits (1943–1994)
- Vsevolod Sanayev (1943–1946)
- Osip Abdulov (1943–1953)
- Sara Bregman (1944–1982)
- Boris Ivanov (1944–2002)
- Konstantin Mikhaylov (1944–1988)
- Lyudmila Shaposhnikova (1944–2003)
- Alexander Gorbatov (1944–1949)
- Boris Novikov (1948)
- Anatoly Adoskin (1948 – 1961, 1968)
- Ethel Kovenskaya (1949–1972)
- Faina Ranevskaya (1949 – 1955, 1963 – 1984)
- Mikhail Sidorkin (1949–1963)
- Mikhail Pogorzhelsky (1949–1995)
- Alla Sevastyanova (1949–1963)
- Georgy Slabinyak (1950–1976)
- Elena Starodomskaya (1950–1959)
- Varvara Soshalskaya-Rozalion (1950–1991)
- Valentina Serova (1951–1959)
- Tamara Thernova (1953–1991)
- Mikhail Lvov (1954–1989)
- Lyubov Orlova (1955–1975)
- Elvira Brunovaskaya (1957–1999)
- Vadim Kucherovsky (1957–1964)
- Rudolf Rudin (1958–1962)
- Vadim Beroyev (1958–1972)
- Valentina Talyzina (1958)
- Serafima Birman (1959–1977)
- Gennady Nekrasov (1960–1985)
- Iya Savvina (1960–1977)
- Nikolai Afonin (1961–2008)
- Nikolai Burlyayev (1961–1966)
- Vladimir Seleznyov (1962–1971)
- Oleg Anofriev (1962–1973)
- Irina Kvitinskaya (1962–2004)
- Gennady Bortnikov (1963–2007)
- Valery Zolotukhin (1963–1964)
- Vladimir Shibankov (1963–1964)
- Galina Dashevskaya (1964-2020)
- Vladimir Dyomin (1964–1974)
- Yuriy Kuzmenkov (1964–2011)
- Galina Vanuyshkina (1964–1985)
- Leonid Markov (1966 – 1986, 1987 – 1991)
- Zemphira Tsakhilova (1966–1975)
- Georgy Zhzhyonov (1968–2005)
- Irina Kalinovskaya (1969–1973)
- Vyatcheslav Persiyanov-Dubrov (1970–1974)
- Marina Neyolova (1973–1974)
- Vladimir Konkin (1973–1974)
- Yan Arlazorov (1974–1989)
- Igor Starygin (1974–1983)
- Sergey Prokhanov (1974–1990)
- Aristarkh Livanov (1977–1986)
- Irina Muravyova (1977–1991)
- Lyudmila Drebneva (1978–1989)
- Natalya Medvedeva (1979–1981)
- Natalya Tenyakova (1979–1989)
- Andrey Nikolayev (1981–1994)
- Boris Nevzorov (1984–1986)
- Yulia Zhzhyonova (1984–2005)
- Pavel Khomsky (1985)
- Svetlana Shershneva (1985)
- Nikolai Prokopovich (1986–2005)
- Vitaly Solomin (1987–1988)
- Dmitry Prodanov (1987–1997)
- Irina Klimova (1988 – 1993, 1999)
- Nikolay Baskanchin (1992–2008)
- Aleksey Shkatov (1992–1995)
- Yevgeniya Kryukova (1993)
- Dmitry Osherov (1994–2008)

=== Present ===
- Vladimir Sulimov (1960)
- Tatyana Bestayeva (1961)
- Nina Drobysheva (1962)
- Margarita Terekhova (1964 – 1983, 1987)
- Alexander Lenkov (1965)
- Evgeniy Steblov (1969)
- Georgiy Taratorkin (1974)
- Sergey Yursky (1978)
- Boris Khimichev (1982)
- Olga Ostroumova (1983)
- Yelena Valyushkina (1984)
- Margarita Shubina (1989)
- Alexander Domogarov (1995)
- Alexander Domogarov (1995)
- Olga Kabo (2002)
- Yekaterina Guseva (2003)
- Gosha Kutsenko (2008)
