= Sergey Dreyden =

Russian actor (1941–2023)

- Сергей Дрейден
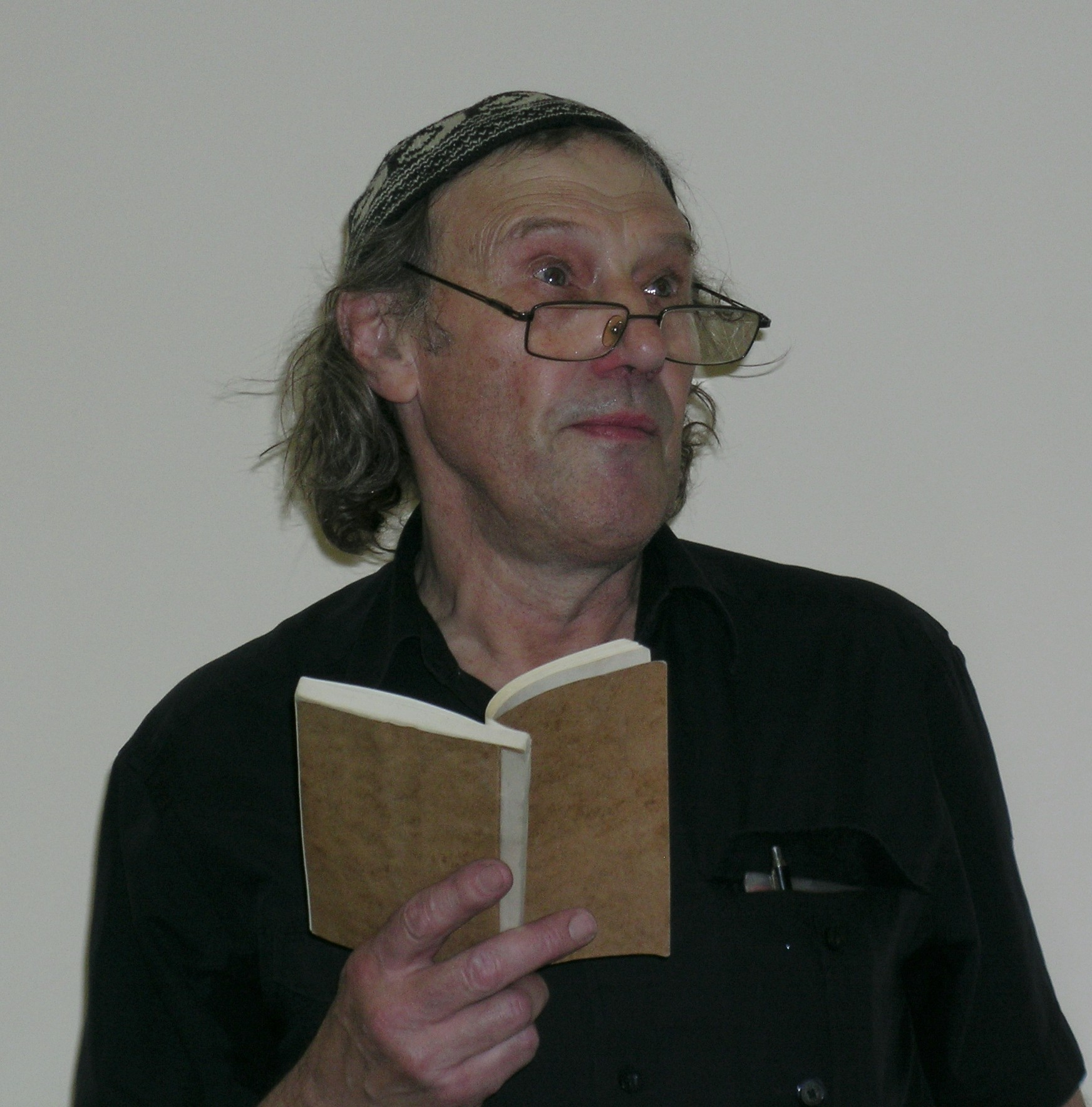
- Dreyden in 2011
- Born: Sergey Simonovich Dreyden; 14 September 1941; Novosibirsk, Russian SFSR, USSR
- Died: 8 May 2023 (aged 81); Saint Petersburg, Russia
- Education: Russian State Institute of Performing Arts
- Occupation: Actor
- Years active: 1962–2023

Sergey Simonovich Dreyden (Russian: Серге́й Си́монович Дре́йден; 14 September 1941 – 8 May 2023), also credited as Sergey Dontsov (Russian: Серге́й Донцо́в), was a Russian actor and star of Alexander Sokurov's Russian Ark.

== Life ==
Sergey Simonovich Dreyden was born in Novosibirsk to theatre director Simon Dreiden and actress Zinaida Dontsova, both of whom were evacuated from Leningrad. He was Jewish on his father's side.

Dreyden listed an impressive host of credits, including his starring role in the 100th anniversary of The Cherry Orchard at the Moscow Art Theatre.

Dreyden died in Saint Petersburg on 8 May 2023, at the age of 81.

== Awards ==
Dreyden was the winner of two National Theatre Award Golden Masks (2000, 2001), the third highest theater prize of St. Petersburg Golden Sofit (1998, 2011, 2012) and the Prize of the Russian Academy Nika Award (2010).

== Selected filmography ==
- About Love (1970) as Mitya
- Looking for a Man (1973) as architect
- Window to Paris (1993) as Chizhov
- The Circus Burned Down, and the Clowns Have Gone (1998) as Aleksei
- Russian Ark (2002) as Marquis de Custine
- Daddy (2004) as Meyer Wolf
- Remote Access (2004) as Sergey's father
- The Fall of the Empire (2005, TV) as Grokhovskoy
- Van Goghs (2019) as Masha's grandfather
- A Siege Diary (2020) as Olga's father
- Petrov's Flu (2021) as old man
