= Robinson Crusoe (1947 film) =

- Directed by: Aleksandr Andriyevsky
- Written by: Aleksandr Andriyevsky, Daniel Defoe (novel)
- Music by: Lev Shvarts (born 17.11.1898 - died 24.02.1962)
- Release date: 20 February 1947
- Running time: 85 minutes
- Language: Russian language

Robinson Crusoe (Russian: Робинзон Крузо, romanized: Robinzon Kruzo) is a 1947 Soviet adventure 3D film.

== Plot ==
The story of the film is based on the 1719 novel Robinson Crusoe by Daniel Defoe.

== Cast ==
- Pavel Kadochnikov - Robinson Crusoe
- Yuri Lyubimov - Friday
- Anatoly Smiranin - Father of Robinson
- E. Sanikidze - Mother of Robinson
- V. Pavlenko - Liza

== Background ==
The film is the first glasses-free stereoscopic feature film, the first Soviet 3D feature film.

Sergei Eisenstein wrote about the film and its use of 3D in 1948: "Will the cinema of the future be stereoscopic? Will tomorrow follow today?" and further: "Mankind has for centuries been moving toward stereoscopic cinema... The bourgeois West is either indifferent or even hostilely ironical toward the problems of stereoscopic cinema.".
