= Light over Russia =

- Russian: Свет над Россией
- Directed by: Sergei Yutkevich
- Written by: Nikolai Pogodin
- Starring: Mikheil Gelovani; Nikolay Okhlopkov; Nikolai Kryuchkov; Kira Golovko
- Music by: Aram Khachaturian
- Release date: 1947
- Running time: 68 min.
- Country: Soviet Union
- Language: Russian

Light over Russia (Russian: Свет над Россией, romanized: Svet nad Rossyey) is a 1947 Soviet history propaganda film directed by Sergei Yutkevich.

The film illustrates the memories of a sailor who survived the Revolution and the Great Patriotic War.

The film was shelved and was not released in cinemas.

== Premise ==
The film is based on the play Kremlovskiye Kurrants by Nikolai Pogodin.

The story is told through the recollections of Alexander Rybakov, a sailor who participated in the October Revolution, guarded Vladimir Lenin, and fought against the fascists during World War II.

The central theme of Light Over Russia is the realization of the plan for the electrification of the entire country (GOELRO), implemented in Russia under the leadership of the Bolshevik Party, led by Lenin and Joseph Stalin, during the 1920s and 1930s.

The film also reflects the story of Herbert George Wells' visit to Moscow and his meeting with the "Kremlin dreamer" Vladimir Lenin, who invited the writer to come to Russia ten years later to witness the implementation of the GOELRO plan. Wells, who wrote the essay Russia in the Dark, visited the USSR in 1934 and was amazed to find that the plan was not only completed but also exceeded expectations in several areas.

== Cast ==
- Nikolai Kolesnikov as Vladimir Lenin
- Mikheil Gelovani as Joseph Stalin
- Vasily Markov as Felix Dzerzhinsky
- Boris Olenin-Girshman as Gleb Krzhizhanovsky
- Nikolay Okhlopkov as Anton Ivanovich Zabelin, engineer
- Kira Golovko as Masha Zabelina (credited as K. Ivanova)
- Nikolai Kryuchkov as Aleksandr Rybakov, sailor
- Benjamin Zuskin as watchmaker
- Sergei Tsenin as H. G. Wells
- Boris Livanov as Vladimir Mayakovsky
- Vasili Vanin as soldier
- Boris Tolmazov as Lastochkin, Red Army soldier
- Vladimir Maryev as Red Army soldier
- Sergey Filippov as speculator
- Yelena Yelina as Lidiya Mikhailovna, Zabelin's wife
- Maria Yarotskaya as Dasha, servant of Zabelins
- Lidiya Sukharevskaya as Yelena Vyacheslavovna, frightened lady
- Yelena Tyapkina as lady with knitting
- Rostislav Plyatt as Optimist
