= In the Name of Life =

- Directed by: Iosif Kheifits; Aleksandr Zarkhi
- Written by: Yevgeni Gabrilovich; Sergei Yermolinsky; Iosif Kheifits; Aleksandr Zarkhi
- Starring: Viktor Khokhryakov; Mikhail Kuznetsov; Oleg Zhakov; Klavdiya Lepanova
- Cinematography: Vyacheslav Gordanov
- Music by: Venedikt Pushkov
- Production company: Lenfilm Studio
- Distributed by: Sovexport
- Release date: 1947
- Running time: 101 minutes
- Country: Soviet Union
- Language: Russian

In the Name of Life (Russian: Во имя жизни, romanized: Vo imya zhizni) is a 1947 Soviet drama film directed by Iosif Kheifits and Aleksandr Zarkhi and starring Viktor Khokhryakov, Mikhail Kuznetsov and Oleg Zhakov.

== Plot ==
Three young surgeons are working on the problem of cell recovery – two of them give up but Dr Petrov continues his research. In difficult times, he supports the budding actress Lena Pogodina, with whom he is in love.

== Cast ==
- Viktor Khokhryakov as Doctor Vladimir Petrov
- Mikhail Kuznetsov as Doctor Aleksandr Kolesov
- Oleg Zhakov as Doctor Aleksei Rozhdestvensky
- Klavdiya Lepanova as Lena
- Lyudmila Shabalina as Vera
- Mikhail Rostovtsev as Uchenyi
- Nikolai Cherkasov as Lukich, the attendant
- Margarita Gromyko as Anushka
- Aleksandr Zrazhevsky
- Boris Kudryavtsev
- Vladimir Dorofeyev

== Bibliography ==
- Liehm, Mira / Liehm, Antonín J. The Most Important Art: Eastern European Film After 1945. University of California Press, 1977.
