= The Murderers Are Coming =

The Murderers are Coming
- Directed by: Vsevolod Pudovkin; Yuri Tarich
- Written by: Manuel Bolshintsov; Bertolt Brecht (play)
- Starring: Mikhail Astangov; Boris Blinov; Sofiya Magarill; Ada Vojtsik; Oleg Zhakov; Olga Zhiznyeva
- Cinematography: Era Savelyeva; Boris Volchek
- Music by: Nikolai Kryukov
- Production companies: Mosfilm; TsOKS
- Release date: 1942
- Running time: 64 minutes
- Country: Soviet Union
- Language: Russian

The Murderers are Coming (Russian: Убийцы выходят на дорогу, romanized: Ubiytsi vikhodyat na dorogu) is a 1942 Soviet war film directed by Vsevolod Pudovkin and Yuri Tarich based on the 1938 play Fear and Misery of the Third Reich by Bertolt Brecht. The film was not allowed to be screened by Soviet censors, with a number of reasons suggested as to why.

This was Sofya Magarill's last film performance.

== Plot ==
The film paints a vivid picture of "two Germanys," weaving multiple storylines to explore the human and moral complexities within Nazi Germany.

One narrative follows drunken soldiers of the Third Reich wandering through unfamiliar streets, discussing national unity. Startled by an old man peeking from a window, they panic and shoot him before fleeing. Another thread involves a woman who receives a "gift from the Führer" as part of the Winter Relief Program—potatoes, apples, and five marks—despite having donated double the amount herself. Her pregnant daughter resents the gesture, revealing her husband’s frustration with rising prices. The soldiers' search of the young woman’s home ends in tension, and the mother hurls a piece of the gifted apple at them in helpless defiance. In another scene, a young couple, Anna and Theo, argue about their strained finances and the reality of life under Hitler, with Theo dismissing Anna's concerns. As suspicions grow, Anna finds chalk marks on her back, a chilling sign of surveillance, and warns her brother Franz of potential danger.

Other vignettes delve into the lives of a conflicted family and workers grappling with war’s brutality. A husband and wife fear retribution after their son, a member of the Hitler Youth, reads aloud about executions and seemingly leaves to report them. Their terror dissipates when he returns with candy instead. A factory worker's wife, mourning her brother's death on the Eastern Front, shares unsettling rumors of German pilots executing parachuting comrades to protect secrets. Her anguished, anti-regime remarks horrify her neighbor and husband. Meanwhile, on the snow-covered terrain of the Soviet Union, three looters abandon a wounded comrade. Upon realizing they've left stolen goods with him, two return to find only sled tracks and their partner missing. Haunted by these signs, they attempt to flee but encounter Soviet partisans. In a final act of defiance, the captain tries to overpower a female partisan but is fatally shot, leaving the partisans to recover their wounded prisoner.

== Cast ==
- Mikhail Astangov - Franz
- Boris Blinov - Theo
- Sofiya Magarill
- Ada Vojtsik - Marta
- Oleg Zhakov
- Olga Zhiznyeva - Clara
- Aleksandr Antonov - Müller, German soldier

== Production ==
During the script development stage, the film bore the title The School of Baseness. Vsevolod Pudovkin and Manuel Bolshentsov worked on the screenplay in late 1941. The working title was changed after the film was placed on the production schedule, replacing G. L. Roshal’s cancelled cinematic pamphlet The Killers Take to the Road.

Since the accompanying documentation has been lost, it is impossible to establish the exact production timeline; however, according to film scholars Evgeny Margolit and Vyacheslav Shmyrov, the change in the production schedule suggests that filming did not begin until March 1942 at the earliest.

== Release ==
Upon the completion of the production process, the film was not released for distribution. According to director D. I. Vasilyev, it was shelved by the studio's artistic council even before being screened for the top leadership. Margolit and Shmyrov posit that the film's premise did not align with the official Soviet line—which, through the medium of "poster cinema," sought to reinforce the "image of the enemy"—and was therefore shelved for many years. They also suggest that a possible contributing factor may have been perceived allusions to the Stalinist regime; however, film critic Mikhail Trofimenkov strongly disagreed with this assessment, arguing that such associations could not have arisen during that period—not only in the minds of the filmmakers but, more significantly, in the minds of the film's censors.
