= Rza Tahmasib =

Azerbaijani film director and actor

- Rza Təhmasib
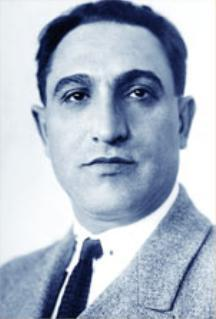
- Born: Rza Tahmasibbeyov; 20 April 1894; Nakhchivan City, Russian Empire
- Died: 14 February 1980 (aged 85); Baku, Azerbaijan SSR, Soviet Union
- Education: Azerbaijan Institute of Theatre
- Occupations: Film director, actor, professor, translator

Rza Abbasgulu oglu Tahmasib (Azerbaijani: Rza Təhmasib; 20 April 1894, Nakhchivan City – 14 February 1980, Baku) was an Azerbaijani film director and actor. He also worked as a professor of theatre, and translator of play scripts from Russian into Azeri.

== Early life ==
Tahmasib was born as Rza Tahmasibbeyov to a wealthy merchant family, on 20 April 1894 in Nakhchivan City, Russian Empire. He received his primary education at Maktab-i Tarbiyya school in Nakhchivan, where he learned Russian, Persian and Arabic languages. He continued his education at a three-year Russian school in his hometown. His interest to theatre was invoked by actor Huseyn Arablinski who was touring Nakhchivan with his troupe in 1907.

In 1910 he left for Tiflis where he studied at a School of Commerce and joined an amateur actors' club at Shaitan Bazaar. Constantly travelling between Nakhchivan, Tiflis and Erivan, he often participate in both amateur and professional theatre activities in all of the three cities. In 1918, Tahmasib moved to Baku to enter the program of Oriental Studies at the Azerbaijan State University. That same year he got married and had a son (who soon died by drowning in the Volga River), but the marriage did not last long. In his final year of university, Tahmasib switched to the program of Education. In 1933 he was invited by Sergei Eisenstein to Moscow to pursue a degree in film directing at the Gerasimov Institute of Cinematography and accepted the invitation, having been involved in theatre throughout the 1920s. In 1934 he married a widowed primary school teacher and had three more children.

== Contributions ==
In 1943, Tahmasib directed the movie Sabuhi (1943), a tribute to writer and philosopher Mirza Fatali Akhundov. However Tahmasib's celebrated masterpiece is considered to be the musical comedy Arshin mal alan ("The Cloth Peddler", 1945), which was a screen adaptation of Uzeyir Hajibeyov's operetta of the same name, composed in 1913. The film was a success not only in Azerbaijan, but throughout the Soviet Union. For directing Arshin mal alan, Tahmasib received the Stalin Prize in 1946.

In 1947, Tahmasib acquired a Ph.D. degree and taught at the Azerbaijan Institute of Theatre (now Azerbaijan State University of Culture and Arts). He also translated plays and theatre-related research articles from Russian to Azeri. His other films include Bakinin ishiglari ("The Lights of Baku", 1950, in which Tahmasib himself starred), Mahni bela yaranir ("A Song Is Created Thus", 1959) and Onu baghishlamag olarmi? ("Can He Be Forgiven?", 1960).
