= Mikhail Astangov =

Soviet actor

- Михаил Астангов
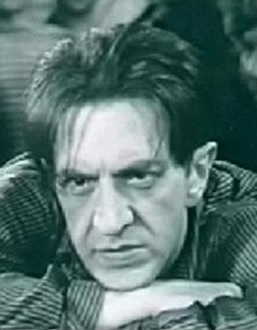
- Born: Mikhail Fyodorovich Ruzhnikov; 3 November 1900; Warsaw, Congress Poland, Russian Empire
- Died: 20 April 1965 (aged 64); Moscow, Russian SFSR, Soviet Union
- Occupations: Actor, pedagogue

Mikhail Fyodorovich Astangov (Note: Russian: Михаил Фёдорович Астангов, romanized: Mikhail Fyodorovich Astangov) (3 November [O.S. 21 October] 1900 – 20 April 1965, born Ruzhnikov) (Note: Russian: Ружников, romanized: Ruzhnikov) was a Soviet and Russian stage and film actor. Astangov was born in Warsaw and died in Moscow. People's Artist of the USSR (1955).

== Filmography ==
- The Conveyor of Death (1933) – Prince Sumbatov
- Convict (1936) – Konstantin "Kostya" Dorokhov
- The Oppenheim Family (1939) – Prof. Bernd Vogelsang
- Minin and Pozharsky (1939) – Sigismund III Vasa
- Suvorov (1941) – Count Aleksey Arakcheyev
- Dream (1941) – Stanislav Komorovsky
- Kotovsky (1943) – Prince Karakozen/his son
- The District Secretary (1942) – Nazi Col. Makenau
- The Murderers are Coming (1942) – Franz
- The Young Fritz (1943, short) – Teacher
- Fifteen-Year-Old Captain (1945) – Sebastian Pereira, alias Negoro
- Miklukho-Maklai (1947) – Dr. Brandler
- The Russian Question (1947) – McPherson – Stalin Prize first degree (1948)
- The Third Blow (1948) – General Erwin Jaenecke
- The Battle of Stalingrad (1949) – Adolf Hitler
- They Have a Motherland (1949) – Orphanage chief captain Robert Scott – Stalin Prize third degree (1951)
- Maksimka (1952) – Captain of ship "Betsy", slave dealer
- Sadko (1952) – Maharaja
- Princess Mary (1955) – Dr. Verner
- The Mexican (1955) – Kelly
- The Hyperboloid of Engineer Garin (1965) – Mr. Rolling
- Going Inside a Storm (1965) – Arkady Borisovich Golitsyn (final film role)

== Awards ==
- Stalin Prize first degree (1948)
- Stalin Prize second degree (1950)
- Stalin Prize third degree (1951)
- People's Artist of the USSR (1955).
