= Russian Ballerina =

- Russian: Солистка балета
- Directed by: Aleksandr Ivanovsky
- Written by: Aron Erlikh; Aleksandr Ivanovsky
- Produced by: Yefim Khayutin
- Starring: Mira Redina; Viktor Kazanovich; Olga Zhiznyeva; Vladimir Gardin; Galina Ulanova
- Cinematography: Arkadi Koltsaty
- Edited by: A. Soboleva
- Music by: Venedikt Pushkov
- Production company: Lenfilm
- Release date: 1947
- Running time: 73 min.
- Country: Soviet Union
- Language: Russian

Russian Ballerina (Russian: Солистка балета, romanized: Solistka baleta) is a 1947 Soviet musical film directed by Aleksandr Ivanovsky.

== Plot ==
A graduate of the choreographic school is looking for a new style for the part in the ballet The Sleeping Beauty. A student of the Conservatory Aleksey falls in love with a young ballerina.

== Cast ==
- Mira Redina as Natasha Subbotina
- Viktor Kazanovich as Aleksey Ozerov
- Olga Zhiznyeva as Nelidova, Ballet Teacher
- Vladimir Gardin as Lyubomirsky
- Galina Ulanova as Prima Ballerina Sinelnikova
- Vladimir Preobrazhenskiy as Sinelnikova's partner
- Nonna Yastrebova as Olga Vereyskaya
- Nina Boldyreva as Olga's mother
- Konstantin Adashevsky as Olga's father
- Aleksandra Trishko as Natasha's grandmother
- Tatyana Piletskaya as episode
