= The Train Goes East =

- Russian: Поезд идёт на восток
- Directed by: Yuli Raizman
- Written by: Leonid Malyugin
- Starring: Lidiya Dranovskaya; Leonid Gallis; Mariya Yarotskaya; Mikhail Vorobyov; Konstantin Sorokin
- Cinematography: Igor Gelein; Arkadi Koltsaty
- Edited by: Tatyana Likhachyova
- Music by: Tikhon Khrennikov
- Production company: Mosfilm
- Release date: 1947
- Running time: 91 min.
- Country: Soviet Union
- Language: Russian

The Train Goes East (Russian: Поезд идёт на восток) is a 1947 Soviet romantic comedy film directed by Yuli Raizman.

The film tells how on Victory Day, on the Moscow-Vladivostok train, Captain Lavrentiev meets with agronomist Zinaida Sokolova. At first they do not like each other, but at one of the stations they get to know each other better against a background of various amusing situations.

== Plot ==
On the evening of May 9, 1945, as thousands celebrated Victory Day in the streets and squares of Moscow, a train departed from the Northern Station bound for Vladivostok. Among the passengers were Zina Sokolova, a young horticulturist from Moscow who had recently graduated from the Timiryazev Agricultural Academy, and Lavrentyev, a naval officer from Leningrad. The two had briefly met earlier at the telegraph window in the station. Lavrentyev initially mistook Zina's lively and spontaneous demeanor for frivolity.

Their journey took an unexpected turn when they missed their train at one of the stops. Forced to continue their travels together, they encountered various people and glimpsed life across the Soviet Union. Their adventure led them to a massive factory built in the taiga, where they boarded a factory plane to continue eastward. After an emergency landing, they traversed the forest in a horse-drawn cart, spent a night at a collective farm’s machine-tractor station, and eventually returned to the railway.

As the journey neared its end in Vladivostok, Zina and Lavrentyev realized they had fallen in love. Their heartfelt confession took place just before reaching their destination. Parting ways at the station, they both knew their separation would not last long.

== Cast ==
- Lidiya Dranovskaya as Sokolova
- Leonid Gallis as Lavrentev
- Mariya Yarotskaya as Zakharova
- Mikhail Vorobyov as Berezin
- Konstantin Sorokin as Train superintendent
- Vladimir Lyubimov as Factory manager
- Vladimir Lepko as Announcer at the station
- Andrei Petrov as Goncharenko
- Alexander Khvylya as Matvey Ivanovich
- Vladimir Dorofeyev as Uncle Egor
- Mariya Andrianova as Praskovya Stepanovna
- Valentina Telegina as Pasha
- Vladimir Belokurov as officer
