= Mira Redina =

Ballet Dancer

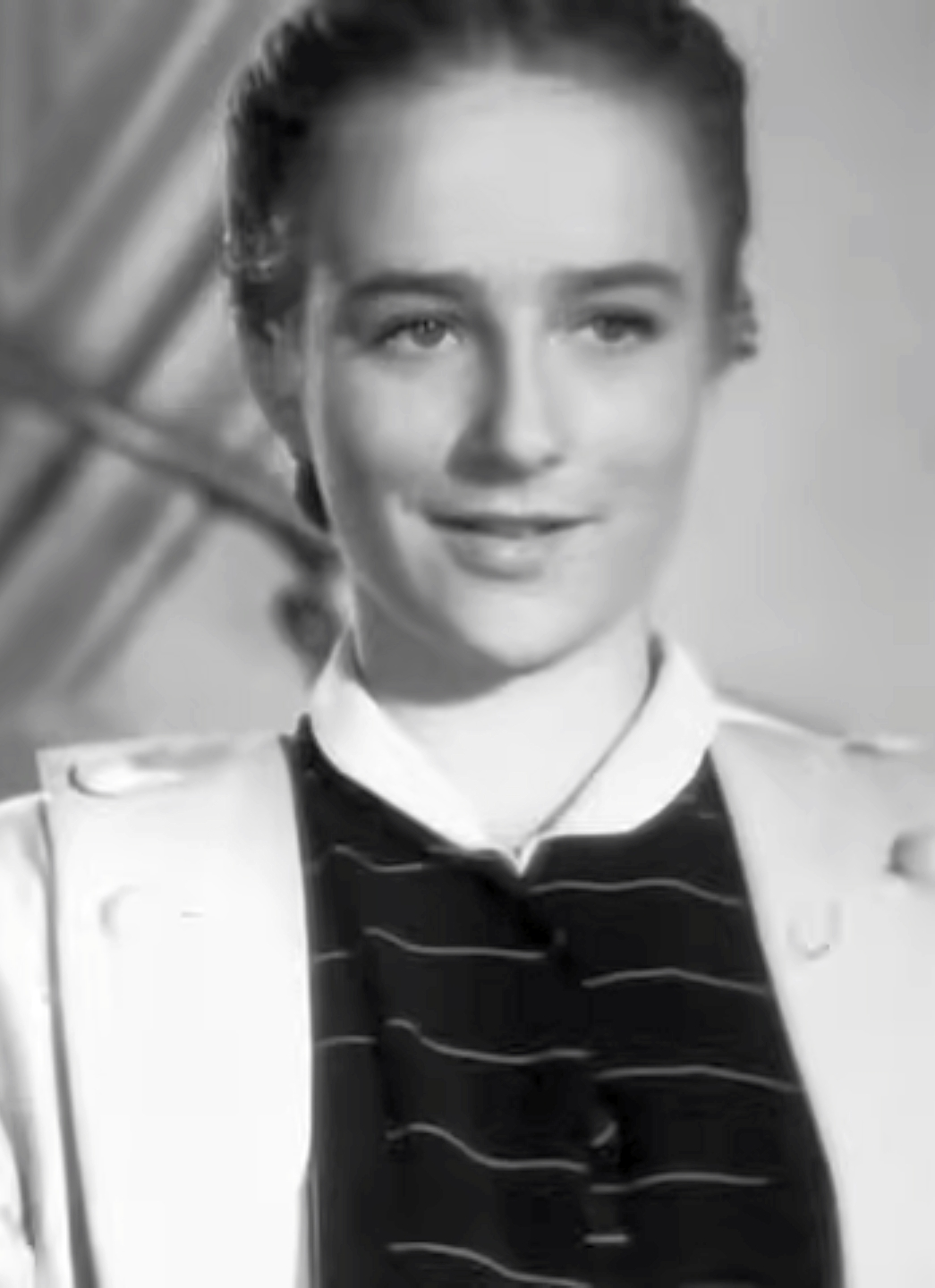
- Mira Redina in 1946
- Born: Mira Yevgenyevna Redina; 2 February 1926; Kaluga, Russian SFSR, Soviet Union
- Died: 2 July 2011 (aged 85); Russia
- Occupations: Ballerina; Choreographer; Actress
- Spouse: Yuri Fantalov
- Children: 1

Mira Yevgenyevna Redina (Russian: Мира Евгеньевна Редина; 2 February 1926 – 2 July 2011) was a ballet dancer, in 1944 to 1965 soloist of the Stanislavski and Nemirovich-Danchenko Moscow Academic Music Theatre. Starred in the movie Russian Ballerina (1947). Honored Artist of the RSFSR (1957).

== Biography ==
Mira Redina was born in Kaluga in Yevgeny Redin's family of February 2, 1926. She studied at the Moscow State Academy of Choreography, the class teachers Elizaveta Gerdt and Maria Kozhukhova. Among her classmates were Raisa Struchkova and Violetta Bovt. During the war, together with the school was evacuated to Vasilsursk.

After graduating in 1944, Redina joined the Moscow Musical Theatre Stanislavsky and Nemirovich-Danchenko, where she danced until 1965. He performed principal roles in ballets by Nikolay Holfin, Alexey Chichinadze and Vladimir Burmeister.
