= Boy from the Outskirts =

- Russian: Мальчик с окраины
- Directed by: Vasily Zhuravlyov
- Written by: Vadim Kozhevnikov; Iosif Prut
- Starring: Yevgeny Samoylov; Sergei Lukyanov; Aleksandra Vasilyeva; Tatiana Okunevskaya; Maya Markova
- Cinematography: Yuli Fogelman
- Music by: Sergei Pototsky
- Production company: Soyuzdetfilm
- Release date: 1947
- Running time: 82 min.
- Country: Soviet Union
- Language: Russian

Boy from the Outskirts (Russian: Мальчик с окраины, romanized: Malchik s okrainy) is a 1947 Soviet drama film directed by Vasily Zhuravlyov.

== Plot ==
In the family of the engineer Skvortsov, on one of the outskirts of Moscow, Andrey's son, the future designer of a high-speed firearm, is growing, but for now an inquisitive and hard-working kid dreaming of studying. Ahead of the Revolution and the Great Patriotic War.

== Cast ==
- Yevgeny Samoylov as Andrey Skvortsov
- Sergei Lukyanov as father of Andrey
- Aleksandra Vasilyeva as mother of Andrey
- Tatiana Okunevskaya as Ira
- Maya Markova as Lida
- Yuri Lyubimov as Kostya Smirnov
- Aleksandr Zrazhevsky as Ryabushkin
- Nikolai Annenkov as Professor Aleksandr Semyonov
- Boris Poslavsky as Ivan Avdeyevich
- Nikolay Bogolyubov as Stepan Shubin
- Anatoli Gonichev as Andrey in childhood
- Aleksandr Sokolov as Kostya in childhood
- Igor Gorlov as Petya
- Irina Mazuruk as Lida in childhood
- Georgiy Millyar as member of examination board
- Andrei Abrikosov as member of Central Committee of the All-Union Communist Party
- Vyacheslav Novikov as Master
- Pavel Shpringfeld as pilot
- Yelena Yegorova as Yelena Georgiyevna
- Ivan Ryzhov as guard at the entrance of arms factory
