= Dmitri Tolmachyov =

Russian footballer

Personal information
- Full name: Dmitri Alekseyevich Tolmachyov
- Date of birth: 25 February 1996 (age 30)
- Height: 1.90 m (6 ft 3 in)
- Position: Defender

Senior career*
Years	Team	Apps	(Gls)
2013–2016	FC Baikal Irkutsk	15	(1)
2016–2017	FC Smena Komsomolsk-na-Amure	17	(0)
2017–2019	FC Zenit Irkutsk	25	(0)
2020	FC Zenit Irkutsk	6	(0)
2022–2023	FC Irkutsk (amateur)		
2023	FC Irkutsk	11	(0)
- * Club domestic league appearances and goals

Dmitri Alekseyevich Tolmachyov (Russian: Дмитрий Алексеевич Толмачёв; born 25 February 1996) is a Russian former football player.

== Club career ==
He made his debut in the Russian Professional Football League for FC Baikal Irkutsk on 25 May 2015 in a game against FC Dynamo Barnaul. He made his Russian Football National League debut for Baikal on 12 March 2016 in a game against FC Yenisey Krasnoyarsk.
