= My Beloved (film) =

- Russian: Дорогой мой человек
- Directed by: Iosif Kheifits
- Written by: Iosif Kheifits; Yuri German
- Starring: Aleksey Batalov; Inna Makarova; Pyotr Konstantinov; Leonid Bykov; Boris Chirkov
- Cinematography: Mikhail Magid; Lev Sokolsky
- Music by: Venedikt Pushkov
- Release date: 1958
- Running time: 102 minute
- Country: Soviet Union
- Language: Russian

My Beloved (Russian: Дорогой мой человек) is a 1958 Soviet war romance film directed by Iosif Kheifits.

== Plot ==
The film tells about the doctor Vladimir Ustimenko, who loves his work with all his heart and Varya Stepnov, who as a child wanted to become a famous actress, but became a geologist. Suddenly there comes a war that separates them...

== Cast ==
- Aleksey Batalov
- Inna Makarova
- Pyotr Konstantinov
- Leonid Bykov
- Boris Chirkov
- Ivan Pereverzev
- Yuriy Medvedev
- Tsetsiliya Mansurova
- Lidiya Shtykan
- Pyotr Kiryutkin
- Pavel Usovnichenko
- Mikhail Yekaterininsky
