= His Name Is Sukhe-Bator =

- Russian: Его зовут Сухэ-Батор
- Directed by: Iosif Kheifits; Aleksandr Zarkhi
- Written by: Zakhar Khatsrevin; Boris Lapin
- Starring: Nikolay Cherkasov; Semyon Goldshtab; Maksim Shtraukh; Lev Sverdlin
- Cinematography: Boris Petrov
- Music by: Boris Arapov; Venedikt Pushkov
- Release date: 1942
- Countries: Soviet Union; Mongolia

His Name Is Sukhe-Bator, (Russian: Его зовут Сухэ-Батор) is a 1942 Soviet historical drama film directed by Iosif Kheifits and Aleksandr Zarkhi.

== Plot ==
The film tells about the founder of the Mongolian People's Revolutionary Party, Damdin Sukhe-Bator.

== Cast ==
- Nikolay Cherkasov as Baron Ungern
- Semyon Goldshtab as Josef Stalin
- Maksim Shtraukh as V.I. Lenin
- Lev Sverdlin
