= Vera Maretskaya =

Soviet and Russian actress

- Вера Марецкая
- Born: 31 July 1906; Barvikha, Moskovsky Uyezd, Moscow Governorate, Russian Empire
- Died: 17 August 1978 (aged 72); Moscow, Russian SFSR, Soviet Union
- Occupation: Actress
- Years active: 1924–1976

Vera Petrovna Maretskaya (Russian: Вера Петровна Марецкая; 31 July 1906 – 17 August 1978) was a Soviet Russian stage and film actress. She was a recipient of People's Artist of the USSR (1949) and Hero of Socialist Labour (1976).

== Early years ==
Vera Petrovna Maretskaya was born in Barvikha, Moscow Governorate. She helped her father Pyotr, who was a candy bar vendor at Moscow Circus. Maretskaya was auditioned by Yevgeny Vakhtangov and studied at Vakhtangov Theatre School, from which she graduated as an actress in 1924. That same year she became permanent member of Theatre-Studio led by Yuri Zavadsky.

He soon became her first husband, and they had one son. They remained lifelong friends and stage partners, even after the end of their brief marriage.

== Life and career ==
In 1925, Maretskaya made her film debut in The Tailor from Torzhok. She played roles in fifteen silent films. In 1937 Maretskaya suffered from the political execution of her two brothers, journalists Dmitry and Grigory, who were the followers of opposition politician Nikolai Bukharin.

Maretskaya appealed to the Soviet government to spare their lives, but her appeal was ignored. Her brothers were executed by gunshots during the purges of the "Great Terror" under the dictatorship of Joseph Stalin. She lost her second husband, a young actor, named Georgy Troitsky, who was killed in action in 1941, during the Second World War. She took care of her own two children, and also adopted the children of her executed brothers. She was supported by Yuri Zavadsky.

By 1940, she was made one the faces of Soviet propaganda films. She shot to fame after the leading role in 'Chlen pravitelstva' (Member of the Government 1940) by directors Aleksandr Zarkhi and Iosif Kheifits. For that role she was awarded the Stalin Prize. At that time Zavadsky's Theatre-Studio merged with the Mossovet Theatre, and in 1940, Maretskaya became a permanent member of the Mossoveta Theatre.

== Later years ==
Maretskaya suffered from breast cancer during the last ten years of her life, and was later diagnosed with brain cancer, but continued her acting career on Moscow Radio. At that time she created popular radio shows based on her adaptations of Woman Without Love and The Art of Living, both by writer André Maurois.

== Honors and awards ==
- Hero of Socialist Labour (1976)
- Stalin Prize first degree (1948)
- Stalin Prize second degree (1942, 1946, 1951)
- People's Artist of the USSR (1949).

== Death ==
Maretskaya died on 17 August 1978, aged 72, and was laid to rest in Novodevichy Cemetery in Moscow.

== Filmography ==
- His Call (1925) as Varya
- The Tailor from Torzhok (1925) as Katya
- Don Diego and Pelagia (1927) as Girl in court
- The Yellow Ticket (1927) as Prostitute
- The House on Trubnaya (1928) as Paranya Pitunova, housekeeper
- The Living Corpse (1929) as Lady
- Two-Buldi-Two (1929) as Revolutionary committee secretary
- The Four Visits of Samuel Wolfe (1934) as Olga
- Dawn of Paris (1936) as Mother Pichot
- Member of the Government (1939) as Aleksandra Sokolova
- The Artamonov Business (1941) as Natalya Yevseyevna Artamonova
- Kotovsky (1942) as Olga, doctor
- She Defends the Motherland (1943) as Praskovya Ivanovna – Stalin Prize second degree (1946)
- The Wedding (1944) as Anna Martynovna Zmeyukina
- The Village Teacher (1947) as Varvara Vasilyevna Martynova – Stalin Prize first degree (1948)
- They Have a Motherland (1949) as Sasha's mother
- The Night Before Christmas (1951) as Solokha the Witch (voice)
- Mother (1955) as Pelageya Nilovna Vlasova
- An Easy Life (1964) as Vasilisa Sergeyevna Muromtseva
