= The District Secretary =

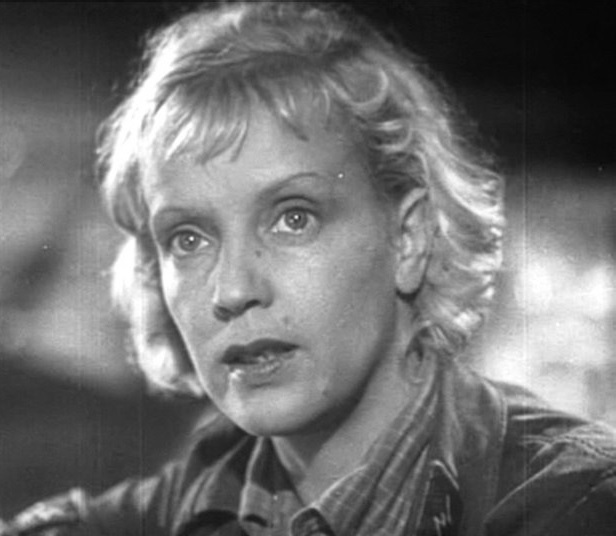
- Marina Ladynina in the movie
- Russian: Секретарь райкома
- Directed by: Ivan Pyryev
- Written by: Iosif Prut
- Starring: Vasili Vanin; Marina Ladynina; Viktor Kulakov; Mikhail Astangov; Boris Poslavsky
- Cinematography: Valentin Pavlov
- Edited by: Anna Kulganek
- Music by: Boris Volsky
- Production company: TsOKS
- Release date: 1942
- Running time: 91 min.
- Country: Soviet Union
- Language: Russian

The District Secretary, (Russian: Секретарь райкома) is a 1942 Soviet World War II film directed by Ivan Pyryev.

== Plot ==
The film takes place in the first year of the Great Patriotic War. The plot is based on the fight between the commander of the partisan detachment and the Secretary of the District Committee of Kochet with Colonel Makenau.

== Starring ==
- Vasili Vanin as District Secretary Stepan Gavrilovich Kochet
- Marina Ladynina as Natasha
- Viktor Kulakov as Lt. Herman Albrecht, alias Lt. Orlov
- Mikhail Astangov as Nazi Col. Makenau
- Boris Poslavsky as Semyen Abramovich Rotman
- Mikhail Kuznetsov as Sasha Rusov
- Mikhail Zharov as Gavril Fedorovich Rusov
- Tatyana Govorkova as The Hostess (uncredited)
- Yevgeni Grigorev as Vasiliy Glushchenko (uncredited)
- Leonid Kulakov as German (uncredited)
- Sofya Levitina as Lady at the identity parade (uncredited)
