= Kotovsky (film) =

- Russian: Котовский
- Directed by: Aleksandr Faintsimmer
- Written by: Aleksei Kapler
- Starring: Nikolai Mordvinov; Vasili Vanin; Nikolay Kryuchkov; Vera Maretskaya; Mikhail Astangov
- Cinematography: Mikhail Gindin
- Music by: Sergei Prokofiev
- Production company: TsOKS
- Release date: 1942
- Running time: 72 minutes
- Country: Soviet Union
- Language: Russian

Kotovsky, (Russian: Котовский) is a 1942 Soviet biopic propaganda film directed by Aleksandr Faintsimmer.

== Plot ==
The film tells about Grigory Kotovsky, a famous participant in the Russian Civil War, who several times managed to escape from prison and never lost on the battlefield.

== Cast ==
- Nikolai Mordvinov as Kotovsky (as N. Mordvinov)
- Vasili Vanin as Kharitonov (as V. Vanin)
- Nikolay Kryuchkov as Kabanyuk / Zagari (as N. Kryuchkov)
- Vera Maretskaya as The doctor (as V. Maretskaya)
- Mikhail Astangov as Knyaz Karakozen / Yego syn (as M. Astangov)
- Konstantin Sorokin as Ordinarets (as K. Sorokin)
- Evgeniy Grigorev as Selyanin (uncredited)
- Ivan Klyukvin
