= The Miners of Donetsk =

- Directed by: Leonid Lukov
- Written by: Vladimir Alekseev; Boris Gorbatov
- Starring: Aleksei Gribov; A. Mansvetov; G. Pasechnik; Viktor Khokhryakov; Mikheil Gelovani
- Cinematography: Mikhail Kirillov
- Music by: Tikhon Khrennikov
- Production company: Gorky Film Studios
- Release date: 16 May 1951
- Running time: 108 minutes
- Country: Soviet Union
- Language: Russian

The Miners of Donetsk or Miners of the Don (Russian: Донецкие шахтёры, romanized: Donetskie shakhtyory) is a 1951 Soviet drama film directed by Leonid Lukov. The film is about the life of miners in Donbas. New technologies are introduced which the miners embrace with enthusiasm.

== Plot ==
At one of the leading coal mines in Donbas, a new coal harvester is being tested. However, the machine proves to be imperfect. Its designer, Trofymenko (Vladimir Druzhnikov), continues working on improving the apparatus. Esteemed miner Stepan Nedolya (Boris Chirkov), young miner Vasya Orlov (Andrei Petrov), and the mine supervisor Gorovoy (Vasiliy Merkuryev) advocate for the adoption of advanced, more efficient labor methods.

Within the ranks of the miners, changes are underway. Some workers must make way for more qualified personnel, while others leave to attend technical institutes, with the aim of returning to their home mines as engineers. These developments reflect a broader transformation in the workforce, emphasizing education and innovation in the mining industry.

== Cast ==
- Aleksei Gribov
- A. Mansvetov
- G. Pasechnik
- Viktor Khokhryakov
- Mikheil Gelovani
- Sergei Lukyanov
- Vasiliy Merkurev as Gorovoi
- Anastasiya Zuyeva
- Vitali Doronin as Pavel Nedolya
- Klara Luchko
- Andrei Petrov
- Vladimir Druzhnikov as Trofimenko
- Lidiya Smirnova as Vera
- Oleg Zhakov
- Pyotr Aleynikov
- Boris Chirkov as Stepan Nedolya
- Semyon Svashenko as Engineer

== Bibliography ==
- Rollberg, Peter. Historical Dictionary of Russian and Soviet Cinema. Scarecrow Press, 2008.
