= Iosif Kheifits =

Soviet film director (1905–1995)

- Иосиф Хейфиц
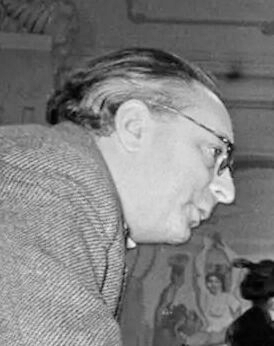
- Born: 17 December [O.S. 4 December] 1905; Minsk, Russian Empire (present-day Belarus)
- Died: 24 April 1995 (aged 89); Saint Petersburg, Russia
- Occupations: Film director; Screenwriter
- Years active: 1928–1989

Iosif Yefimovich Kheifits (Note: Russian: Иосиф Ефимович Хейфиц, romanized: Iosif Yefimovich Kheyfits; Belarusian: Іосіф Яфімавіч Хейфіц, romanized: Iosif Yafimavich Khyeyfits; Sometimes romanized as Josef Heifitz, Josif Heifits (Oxford Companion to Film, 1976, p. 326)) (17 December [O.S. 4 December] 1905 – 24 April 1995) was a Soviet film director, winner of two Stalin Prizes (1941, 1946), People's Artist of USSR (1964), Hero of Socialist Labor (1975). Member of the Communist Party of Soviet Union since 1945.

== Life and career ==
Kheifets was born 17 December 1905 in Minsk. In 1927 he graduated from the Leningrad Technical-Screen Art (present-day Saint Petersburg State Institute of Film and Television). In 1928, he graduated from the cinema faculty of Institute of History of Art. In 1928, Iosif Kheifets came to work at the film studio Sovkino (present-day Lenfilm Studio). In film, he first made his debut as a screenwriter, with Aleksandr Ivanov and Aleksandr Zarkhi he created the scripts for films The Moon Is to the Left and Transport of Fire.

Then, Iosif Kheifits became a director, while from 1928 to 1950 he worked with Aleksandr Zarkhi, headed the 1st Komsomol stage brigade of Sovkino, releasing films on the Soviet youth: Wind in the Face (1930), Noon (1931), and the comedy Hectic Days (1935). Baltic Deputy (1937) featured how Russian scientist Professor Polezhayev (based on the life of Kliment Timiryazev, starring Nikolay Konstantinovich Cherkasov) joined the October Revolution. A significant performance was in Member of the Government (1939), a film centered on the image of a Russian peasant woman (starring Vera Maretskaya), who took the difficult path from a farmhand to a deputy of the Supreme Soviet. Together with Zarkhi, Kheifits set such films as His Name Is Sukhe-Bator (1942), The Last Hill (1944), and the 1945 documentary The Defeat of Japan. In the 1950s, Kheifits directed such films as A Big Family, Rumyantsev Case, and My Beloved. He later turned towards the Russian classics, filming works of Anton Chekhov, Ivan Turgenev, and Aleksandr Kuprin: Lady with the Dog, The Bad Good Man, Asya, and Shurotchka.

In 1970, his film Hail, Mary! was entered in the 7th Moscow International Film Festival. In 1975 he was a member of the jury at the 9th Moscow International Film Festival.

Deep exposition of the inner nature of characters and a refined understanding of cinematic language can be listed as distinctive features of his work.

His films hosted renowned performances by many actors, such as Iya Savvina, Alexei Batalov, Anatoly Papanov, Oleg Dal, Vladimir Vysotsky, Lyudmila Maksakova, Ada Rogovtseva, Elena Koreneva, Stanislav Sadalskiy.

Kheifits was honored with various film awards, including at the Cannes Film Festival. Kheifits's last work was the dramatic film Vagrant Bus, which was released in 1989.

Iosif Kheifits died on 24 April 1995. He was buried at the cemetery in Komarovo.

== Filmography ==
=== Assistant director ===
- 1928 - The Moon Is to the Left
- 1930 - Transport of Fire

=== Director ===
- 1930 - Wind in the Face
- 1931 - Noon
- 1933 - My Motherland
- 1935 - Hectic Days
- 1936 - Baltic Deputy
- 1939 - Member of the Government
- 1942 - His Name Is Sukhe-Bator
- 1944 - The Last Hill
- 1946 - In the Name of Life
- 1948 - The Precious Seed
- 1950 - The Lights of Baku
- 1953 - Spring in Moscow
- 1954 - A Big Family
- 1955 - The Rumyantsev Case
- 1958 - My Beloved
- 1961 - The Horizon
- 1960 - Lady with the Dog
- 1963 - A Day of Happiness
- 1966 - In S. City
- 1971 - Hail, Mary!
- 1973 - The Bad Good Man
- 1975 - The Only One
- 1977 - Asya
- 1979 - First Time Married
- 1983 - Shurotchka
- 1986 - The Accused
- 1988 - Whose Are You, Old People?
- 1989 - Vagrant Bus

=== Written scenarios ===
- 1928 - The Moon Is to the Left
- 1935 - Red Army Days
- 1939 - Member of the Government
- 1944 - The Last Hill
- 1986 - The Accused
- 1989 - Vagrant Bus

== Awards and prizes ==
- Stalin Prize, second class (1941); for the film "Baltic Deputy" (1936)
- Stalin Prize of the first degree (1946); for the documentary "The defeat of Japan" (1945)
- People's Artist of the USSR (1964)
- Hero of Socialist Labour (1975)
