= Viktor Khokhryakov =

Soviet actor and theatre director

- Виктор Хохряков
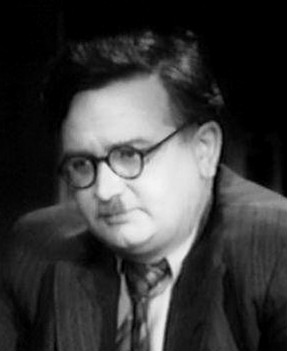
- Khokhryakov in 1948
- Born: 26 July 1913 [O.S. 13 July] Ufa, Russian Empire
- Died: 20 September 1986 (aged 73); Moscow, Russian SFSR, Soviet Union
- Occupations: Actor; Theater director
- Years active: 1947–1974

Viktor Ivanovich Khokhryakov (Note: Russian: Виктор Иванович Хохряков, romanized: Viktor Ivanovich Khokhryakov) (26 July 1913 [O.S. 13 July] – 20 September 1986) was a Soviet Russian film actor, theater actor and director. He played the composer Alexander Glazunov in the 1954 film Rimsky-Korsakov.

People's Artist of the USSR (1973). Winner of two Stalin Prizes (1949, 1951).

== Biography ==
Victor Khokhryakov was born on July 13 (26), 1913 in Ufa.

Work in the theater began in the auxiliary structure of the Bashkir Academic Drama Theater Mazhit Gafuri (1926).

In 1933 he graduated from the Leningrad College of Performing Arts.

== Selected filmography ==
- In the Name of Life (1946)
- Michurin (1948)
- The Young Guard (1948)
- The Miners of Donetsk (1951)
- Rimsky-Korsakov (1954)
- Seven Nannies (1962)
- Earthly Love (1974)
- Destiny (1977)

== Bibliography ==
- Mitchell, Charles P. The Great Composers Portrayed on Film, 1913 Through 2002. McFarland / Company, 2004.
