= Nikolay Mordvinov (actor) =

- Born: Nikolay Dmitriyevich Mordvinov; 15 February 1901; Yadrin, Kazan Governorate, Russian Empire
- Died: 26 January 1966 (aged 64); Moscow, Soviet Union
- Occupations: Actor, theater director
- Years active: 1925–1965

Nikolay Dmitriyevich Mordvinov (15 February 1901 – 26 January 1966) was a Soviet and Russian stage and film actor and theater director. He appeared in nine films from 1936 to 1965. People's Artist of the USSR (1949).

== Filmography ==
Year	Title	Role	Notes
1941	Bogdan Khmelnitsky	Bohdan Khmelnytsky	Stalin Prize first degree (1942)
1941	Masquerade	Yevgeny Arbenin	
1942	Kotovsky	Grigory Kotovsky	
1942	Lad from Our Town	Aleksei Petrovich Vasnetsov	
1946	In the Mountains of Yugoslavia	Slavko Babić	
1949	The Fall of Berlin	Lavrentiy Beria (removed in 1953)	
1950	The Lights of Baku	Lavrentiy Beria (removed from the finished film)	
1950	Brave People	Kozhin	
1951	The Miners of Donetsk	Lavrentiy Beria	

== Awards and honors ==
- Honored Artist of the RSFSR (1935)
- Stalin Prize first degree (1942)
- Two Stalin Prize second degree (1949, 1951)
- Honored Artist of the Kazakh SSR (1943)
- Medal "For the Defence of Moscow" (1945)
- Medal "For Valiant Labour in the Great Patriotic War 1941–1945" (1946)
- Order of the Red Banner of Labour (1947)
- People's Artist of the RSFSR (1947)
- People's Artist of the USSR (1949)
- Lenin Prize (1965)
- Medal "In Commemoration of the 800th Anniversary of Moscow"
