= Nikolay Cherkasov =

Soviet and Russian actor (1903–1966)

- Николай Черкасов
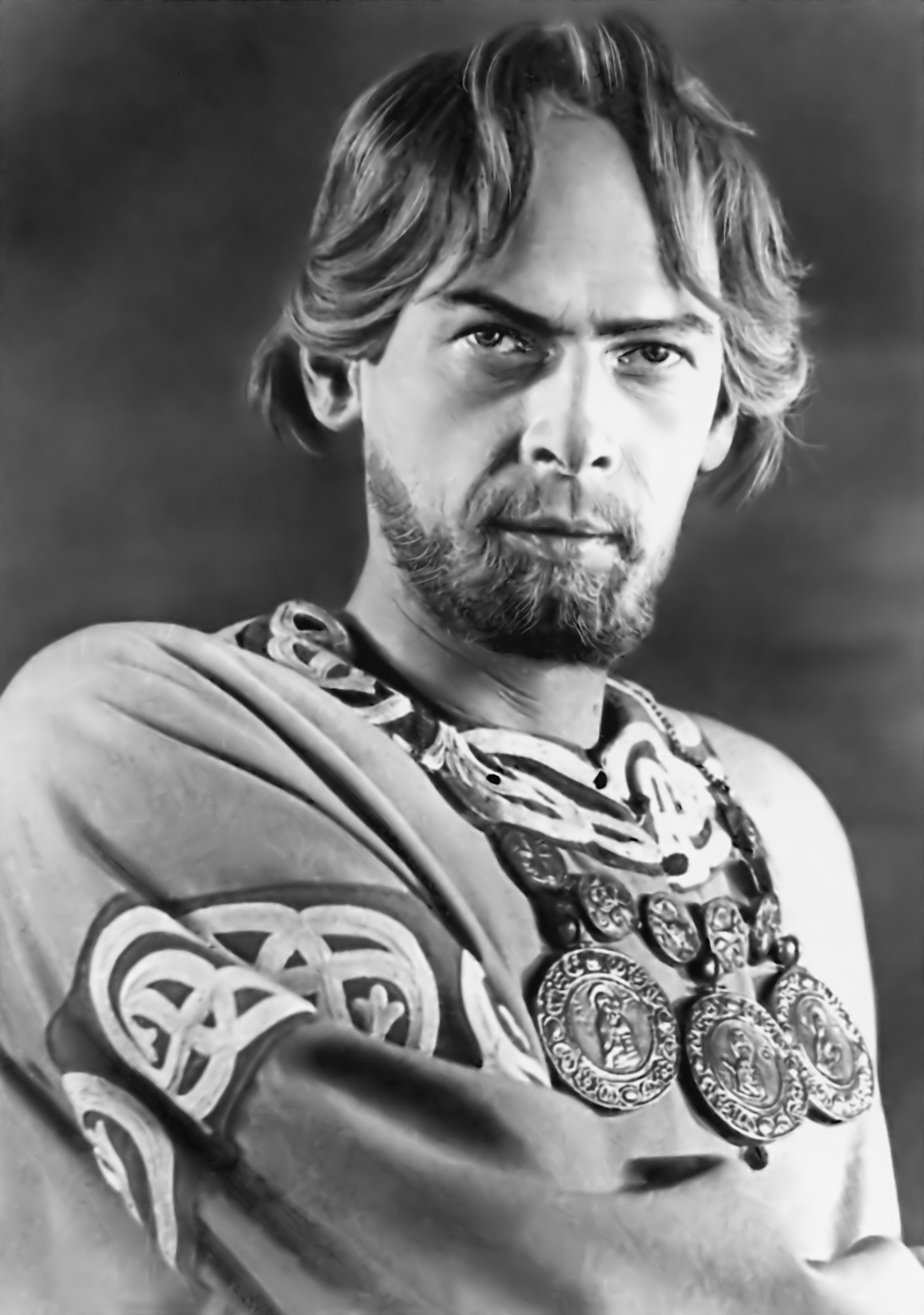
- Cherkasov in Alexander Nevsky, 1938
- Born: July 27, 1903; Saint Petersburg, Russian Empire
- Died: September 14, 1966 (aged 63); Leningrad, Russian SFSR, Soviet Union
- Resting place: Tikhvin Cemetery
- Occupation: Actor
- Years active: 1918–1965
- Awards: Stalin prize (1941, 1946, 1950, 1951 − twice)

Nikolay Konstantinovich Cherkasov (Note: Russian: Николай Константинович Черкасов, romanized: Nikolay Konstantinovich Cherkasov) (27 July [O.S. 14 July] 1903 – 14 September 1966) was a Soviet and Russian actor. He was named People's Artist of the USSR in 1947.

He is best known for his collaboration with director Sergei Eisenstein, playing the title roles in the historical epics Alexander Nevsky (1938) and Ivan the Terrible (1944/1958).

== Early life ==
He was born in Saint Petersburg (later Petrograd in 1914, and Leningrad from 1924 to 1991) into the family of a railway clerk. From 1919 he was a mime artist in Petrograd's Maryinsky Theatre, the Bolshoi Theatre, and elsewhere. After graduating from the Institute of Stage Arts in 1926, he began acting in the Young Spectator's Theatre in Leningrad.

== Career ==
Cherkasov debuted in film with a supporting role as the hairdresser Charles in Vladimir Gardin’s Pushkin biopic The Poet and the Tsar (1927). Cherkasov was one of Stalin's favorite actors and played title roles in Sergei Eisenstein's monumental sound films Alexander Nevsky (1938) and Ivan the Terrible (Part I, 1944; Part II, 1946, though it was suppressed by Soviet authorities and not released widely until 1958). He also played Jacques Paganel in the 1936 adaptation of Jules Verne's The Children of Captain Grant. In the 1947 comedy Springtime, Cherkasov appeared alongside other icons of Soviet cinema, Lyubov Orlova and Faina Ranevskaya. For the role of Alexander Popov in the film Alexander Popov in 1951, he received a Stalin Prize of the second degree. In 1957, Cherkasov portrayed Don Quixote in director Grigori Kozintsev's screen adaptation of the novel.

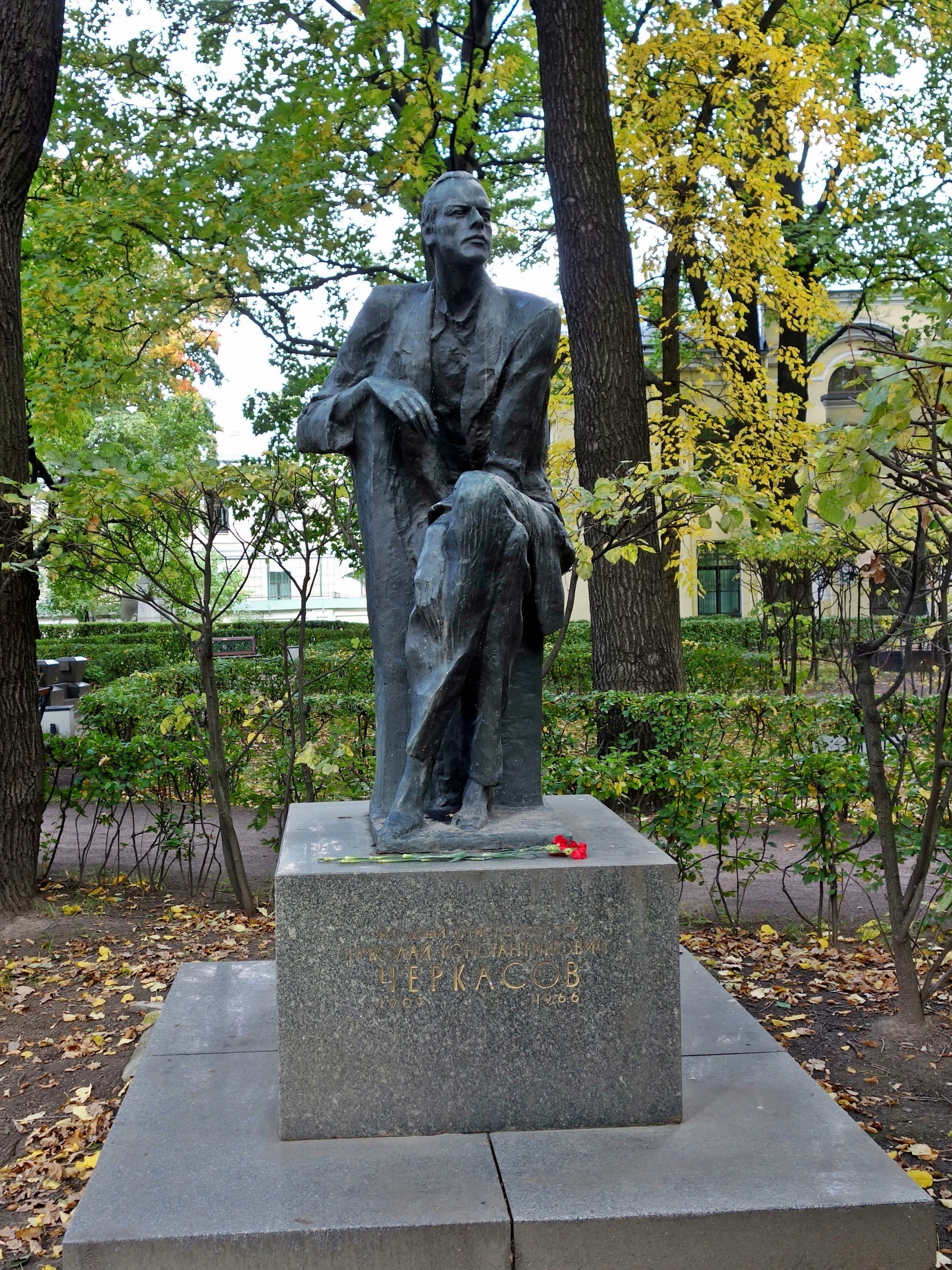
Cherkasov's grave, Tikhvin Cemetery, Saint Petersburg

In 1941, Cherkasov was awarded the Stalin Prize; in 1947, he was named a People's Artist of the USSR. He wrote his memoirs, "Notes of a Soviet Actor" in 1951. He died in Leningrad in 1966 and was buried in Tikhvin Cemetery, the "Necropolis of the Masters of Art", at the Alexander Nevsky Lavra.

The image of Cherkasov in the role of Alexander Nevsky is on the Soviet Order of Alexander Nevsky, because there are no known portraits of Nevsky himself.

== Filmography ==
Year	Title	Role	Notes
1927	The Poet and the Tsar	Charles, the barber	
1928	His Excellency	Tall clown	
1928	My Son	Pat	
1929	Moon Left	Kalugin	lost film
1929	Sibling	episode	
1930	Riders of the Wind	Komsomol member	
1932	The Counter	episode	
1934	Crown Prince of the Republic	Waitor	
1934	Do I Love You?	student	
1934	Who is Your Friend	policeman	
1935	Happiness	episode	
1935	Red Army Days	Kolka Loshak	
1935	Marriage of Jean Knokke	Captain Hans Pfal	
1935	The Border	Gaidul	
1936	Girl Friends	White army Officer	
1936	The Children of Captain Grant	Jacques Paganel	
1937	Baltic Deputy	Professor Dmitriy Illarionovich Polezhayev	
1937-1938	Pyotr Pervyy (part 1, 2)	Alexei Petrovich, Tsarevich of Russia	
1937	For the Soviet Homeland	Commander-in-Chief	
1938	Treasure Island	Billy Bones	
1938	Alexander Nevsky	Alexander Nevsky	Stalin Prize of first degree (1941)
1938	Friends	Beta the Ossesian	
1939	Lenin in 1918	Maxim Gorky	
1940	Concert on Screen	Concert MC	
1942	The Defense of Tsaritsyn	Peasant	Uncredited
1942	His Name Is Sukhe-Bator	Baron Ungern	
1943	Sixty Days	Antonov	
1945; 1958	Ivan the Terrible (part 1, 2)	Ivan the Terrible	Stalin Prize of first degree (1946)
1947	In the Name of Life	Lukich, the attendant	
1947	Springtime	Arkadi Mikhailovich Gromov, director	
1947	New Home	Mikhail Andreevich Kostousov, academician of architecture	
1947	Pirogov	Lyadov	
1948	Pamyati S. M. Eyzenshteyna	Self	
1949	Ivan Pavlov	Maxim Gorky	
1949	Alexander Popov	Alexander Popov	Stalin Prize of second degree (1951)
1949	The Battle of Stalingrad (part 1, 2)	Franklin D. Roosevelt	
1949	Happy Sailing	captain Levashov	Stalin Prize of third degree (1950)
1950	Mussorgsky	Stasov, the critic	Stalin Prize of first degree (1951)
1953	Rimsky-Korsakov	Stasov, the critic	
1955	They Knew Mayakovsky	Mayakovsky	
1957	Sung by Yves Montand	Self	uncredited
1957	Don Quixote	Don Quixote	
1962	Wakengo Rapids Are Noisy	Captain Stanton	tv-movie
1963	Dunaevsky's Melodies	Self	
1963	All Remains to People	Academician Fyodor Alekseevich Dronov	Lenin Prize (1964)
1965	Nights of Farewell	Gedeonov	
1965	Great Friendship Pages	narrator	
1966	Little Tragedies	Baron	last role
