= Aleksandr Zarkhi =

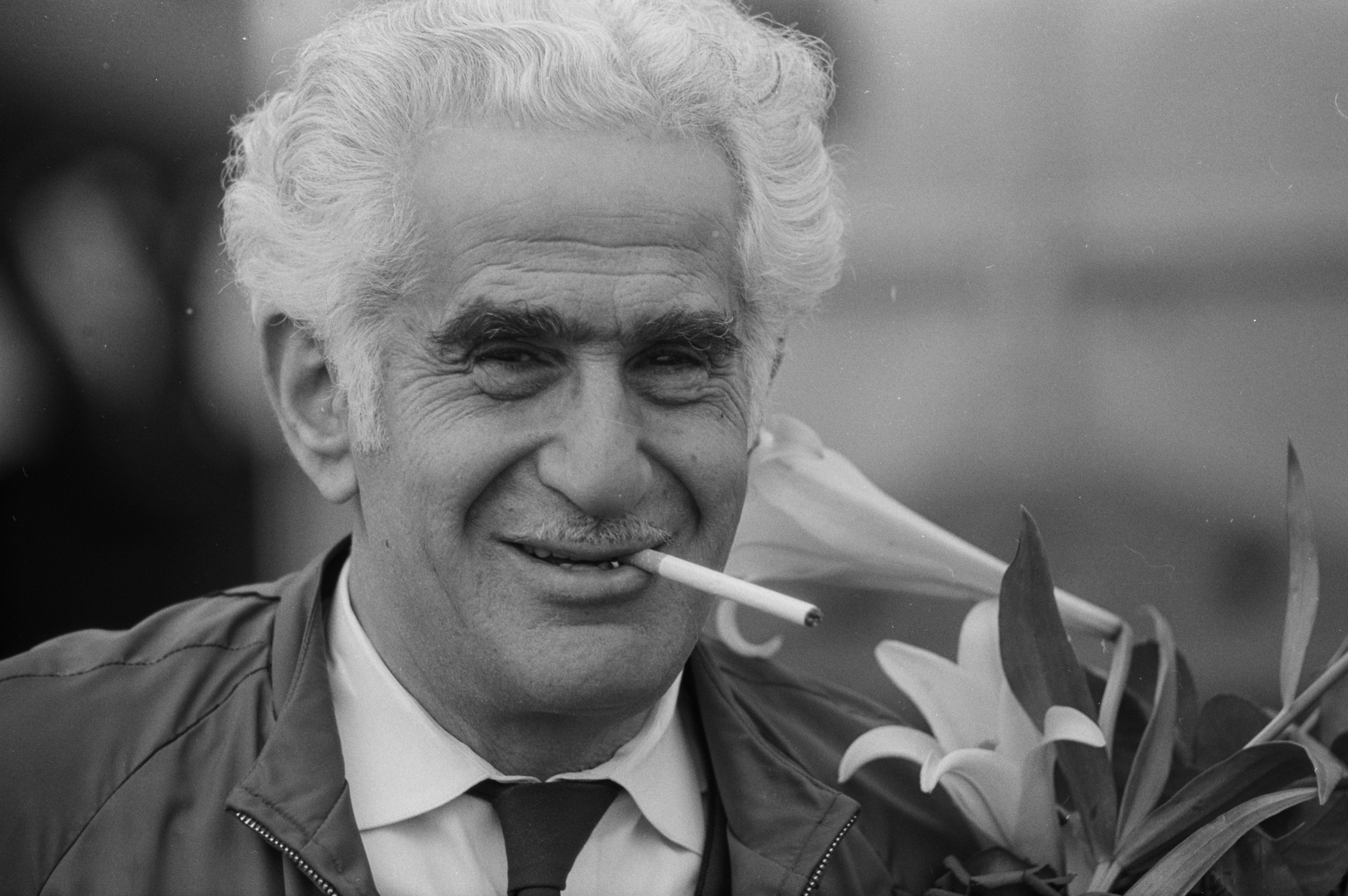
- Born: Aleksandr Grigoryevich Zarkhi; 18 February 1908; Saint Petersburg, Russian Empire
- Died: 27 January 1997 (aged 88); Moscow, Russia
- Occupations: Film director, screenwriter
- Years active: 1928–1986

Aleksandr Grigoryevich Zarkhi (Russian: Александр Григорьевич Зархи; 18 February 1908 – 27 January 1997) was a Soviet and Russian film director and screenwriter. People's Artist of the USSR (1969). Hero of Socialist Labour (1978).

His film Twenty Six Days from the Life of Dostoyevsky was nominated for the Golden Bear at the 31st Berlin International Film Festival in 1981.

== Filmography ==
- The Song of Metal (Песнь о металле) (1928); documentary
- Wind in the Face (Ветер в лицо) (1930); co-directed with Iosif Kheifits
- Noon (Полдень) (1931); co-directed with Iosif Kheifits
- My Motherland (Моя Родина) (1933); co-directed with Iosif Kheifits
- Hectic Days (Горячие денечки) (1935); co-directed with Iosif Kheifits
- Baltic Deputy (Депутат Балтики) (1937); co-directed with Iosif Kheifits
- Member of the Government (Член правительства) (1940); co-directed with Iosif Kheifits
- His Name Is Sukhe-Bator (Его зовут Сухэ-Батор) (1942); co-directed with Iosif Kheifits
- The Last Hill (Малахов курган)(1944); co-directed with Iosif Kheifits
- In the Name of Life (Во имя жизни) (1946); co-directed with Iosif Kheifits
- The Precious Seed (Драгоценные зерна) (1948); co-directed with Iosif Kheifits
- The Fires of Baku (Огни Баку) (1950); co-directed with Iosif Kheifits and Rza Tahmasib
- Kolkhoz Rassvet (Колхоз "Рассвет") (1951); documentary
- Pavlinka (Павлинка) (1952); TV play
- Nesterka (Нестерка) (1954)
- The Height (Высота) (1957)
- People on the Bridge (Люди на мосту) (1960)
- My Younger Brother (Мой младший брат) (1962)
- Hello, Life! (1963)
- Anna Karenina (Анна Каренина) (1967)
- Towns and Years (Города и годы) (1973)
- Story of an Unknown Actor (Повесть о неизвестном актере) (1976)
- Twenty Six Days from the Life of Dostoyevsky (Двадцать шесть дней из жизни Достоевского) (1981)
- Chicherin (Чичерин) (1986)

== Awards and honours ==
- Three Orders of the Red Banner of Labour (1940)
- Two Stalin Prizes (1941, 1946)
- People's Artist of the RSFSR (1965)
- People's Artist of the USSR (1969)
- Hero of Socialist Labour (1978)
- Order of Lenin (1978)
- Order of the October Revolution (1986)
