= Oleg Zhakov =

Soviet actor (1905–1988)

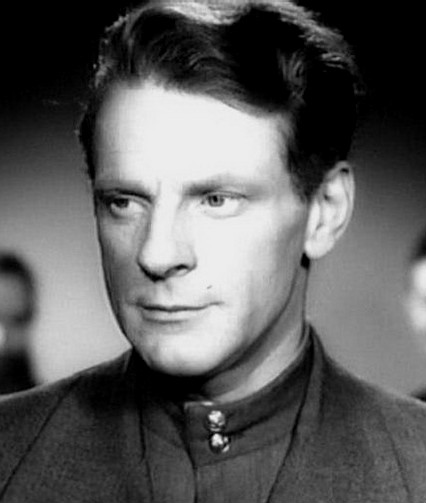
Zhakov in 1948

Oleg Petrovich Zhakov (Russian: Олег Петрович Жаков; 1 April 1905 – 4 May 1988) was a Soviet and Russian film actor who was born in Sarapul, Vyatka Governorate. He performed in more than sixty films between 1927 up to 1988. People's Artist of the USSR (1969). Winner of USSR State Prize (1971) and the Stalin Prize of the second degree (1946).

He graduated from the Leningrad College of Performing Arts (1929).

He starred in more than a hundred films.

After 1957 he lived in Pyatigorsk, where he died on May 4, 1988. He was buried at Krasnoslobodskoye Сemetery in Pyatigorsk.

== Selected filmography ==
Film
Year	Title	Role	Notes
1973	Looking for a Man	The Man	
1969	By the Lake	Alexander Alexandrovich Barmin	
1968	The Seven Cervi Brothers	Alcide Cervi	
1955	The Shadow Near the Pier	Major Lyudov	
1954	A Tale of the Forest Giant	Nikandr Petrovich Dudin	
1953	Hostile Whirlwinds	Georgy Pyatakov	
1953	The Great Warrior Skanderbeg	Tanush Thopia	
1948	The Precious Seed	Ivashin	
1946	The White Fang	Weedon Scott	
1946	In the Name of Life	Rozhdestvensky	
1944	Ivan the Terrible	Heinrich von Staden	
1942	The Murderers are Coming	captain	
1938	The Great Citizen	Sergey Vasilevich Borovsky	
1938	Professor Mamlock	Rolf Mamlok	
1938	Peat-Bog Soldiers	Paul	
1937	For the Soviet Motherland	Toivo Antikainen	
1936	The Sailors of Kronstadt	Regiment Commander Draudin	
1930	Wind in the Face	Boris	
1929	The New Babylon	communard	
1927	The Club of the Big Deed	Hussar	
1926	The Overcoat	an official in the cloak	
