= Yakov Protazanov filmography =

A list of films directed by Yakov Protazanov.

Title	Original title	Notes
1909
The Fountain of Bakhchisaray	Бахчисарайский фонтан	
1911
The Convict's Song	Песня каторжанина	
The Song of the Prophet Oleg	Песнь о вещем Олеге	
1912
Anfisa	Анфиса	
Departure of a Grand Old Man	Уход великого старца	
1913
Nailed Down	Пригвожденный	
For the Honour of the Russian Flag	За честь русского знамени	
How the Child's Soul Cried	Как рыдала душа ребенка	
The Bought Husband	Купленный муж	
The Executioner's Son	Сын палача	
The Broken Vase	Разбитая ваза	
A Chopin Nocturne	Ноктюрн Шопена	
How Fine, How Fresh the Roses Were	Как хороши, как свежи были розы...	
The Keys to Happiness	Ключи счастья	co-directed with Vladimir Gardin
What the Violin Lamented	О чем рыдала скрипка	
The Brand of Pleasures Past	Клеймо прошедших наслаждений	
Moment Musical	Музыкальный момент	
One Had Fun, Another Paid	Один насладился, другой расплатился	
1914
Do Your Duty	Сделайте ваше одолжение	
By a Mother's Hand	Рукою матери	
If a Woman Wants, She Can Fool the Devil	Женщина захочет - черта обморочит	
Tango	Танго	
Passing Life By	Мимо жизни	
Guardian of Virtue	Блюститель нравственности	
The Dance with the Vampire	Танец с вампиром	
A Work of Art	Произведение искусства	
The Arena of Vengeance	Арена мести	
The Devil	Дьявол	
Amor, Arthur and Co.	Амур, Артур и К	
The Face of War	Лицо войны	
The Anger of Dionysus	Гнев Диониса	
The Monkey Saved Them	Обезьянка выручила	
Dance Among the Swords	Пляска среди мечей	
The Christmas Tree	Елка	
Drama by the Telephone	Драма у телефона	
The Living Mannequin	Живой манекен	
Christmas in the Trenches	Рождество в окопах	
On Trial	На скамье подсудимых	
1915
Wisdom Tooth	Зуб мудрости	
War and Peace	Война и мир	co-directed with Vladimir Gardin
The Plebeian	Плебей	
The Deputy	Депутат	
The Seagull	Чайка	
Nikolai Stavrogin	Николай Ставрогин	
My Conscience and I	Я и моя совесть	
On the Outskirts of Moscow	На окраинах Москвы	
Natasha Proskurova	Наташа Проскурова	
Don't Go Asking Her Questions	Не подходите к ней с вопросами	
Sashka the Seminarian	Сашка-семинарист	co-directed with Cheslav Sabinsky
Mystery of Nizhny Novgorod Fair	Тайна нижегородской ярмарки	
1916
The Dance of Death	Пляска смерти	
Give Her Something, For the Sake of Christ!	Нищая	
I'll Hitch Up a Troika of Swift Dark Brown Horses	Запрягу я тройку борзых, темнокарих лошадей	
God's Judgement	Суд божий	
The Queen of Spades	Пиковая дама	
The Woman with a Dagger	Женщина с кинжалом	
The Song Remained Unfinished	И песнь осталась недопетой	
Family Happiness	Семейное счастье	
Tasia	Тася	
Covet Not Thy Neighbour's Wife	Не пожелай жены ближнего твоего	
She Wanted Happiness So Madly, So Passionately	Так безумно, так страстно хотелось ей счастья	
Sin	Грех	
Down Mother Volga	Вниз по матушке, по Волге	
Miss Mary	Панна Мэри	
1917
In the Power of Sin	Во власти греха	co-directed with G. Azagarov
The Public Procurator	Прокурор	
Andrei Kozhukhov	Андрей Кожухов	
No Bloodshed!	Не надо крови	
The Road to Calvary	Крестный путь	
Those Damned Millions	Проклятые миллионы	
Satan Triumphant	Сатана ликующий	
The Stormy Sea Drew Her	Ее влекло бушующее море	
1918
Little Ellie	Малютка Элли	
A Knight of the Spirit	Богатырь духа	
Father Sergius	Отец Сергий	
The Man at the Railing	Человек у решетки	
Jenny the Maid	Горничная Дженни	
1919
The Dumb Watchman	Немой страж	
The Black Flock	Черная стая	
The Queen's Secret	Тайна королевы	
Now Hope, Now Blind Jealousy	То надежда, то ревность слепая	
A Woman's Golgotha	Голгофа женщины	
Truth	Правда	
1920
Member of Parliament	Член парламента	
1921
For a Night of Love	Pour une nuit d'amour	
Justice Above All	Justice d'abord	
The Meaning of Death	Le Sens de la mort	
1922
The Shadow of Sin	L'Ombre du péché	
1923
A Narrow Escape	L'Angoissante aventure	
Pilgrimage of Love	Der Liebe Pielgefahrt	
1924
Aelita	Аэлита	
1925
His Call	Его призыв	
The Tailor from Torzhok	Закройщик из Торжка	
1926
The Three Million Trial	Процесс о трех миллионах	
1927
The Forty-First	Сорок первый	
Man from the Restaurant	Человек из ресторана	
Don Diego and Pelageia	Дон Диего и Пелагея	
1928
The White Eagle	Белый орел	
1929
Ranks and People	Чины и люди	
1930
St. Jorgen's Day	Праздник святого Йоргена	
1931
Tommy	Томми	
1934
Marionettes	Марионетки	
1936
Love's Strangeness	О странностях любви	
Without a Dowry	Бесприданница	
1938
Class Seven	Семиклассники	
1940
Salavat Yulayev	Салават Юлаев	
1943
Nasreddin in Bukhara	Насреддин в Бухаре	
