= List of Soviet films of 1934 =

A list of films produced in the Soviet Union in 1934 (see 1934 in film).

== 1934 ==
Title	Russian title	Director	Cast	Genre	Notes
1934
Chapaev	Чапаев	Vasilyev brothers	Boris Babochkin, Boris Blinov	War film	
Accordion	Гармонь	Igor Savchenko	Zoya Fyodorova	Musical, comedy	
Boule de Suif	Пышка	Mikhail Romm	Galina Sergeyeva	Drama	
Crown Prince of the Republic	Наследный принц Республики	Eduard Ioganson	Pyotr Kirillov	Comedy	
Dokhunda	Дохунда	Lev Kuleshov	Kamil Yarmatov, T. Rakhmanova	Drama	
The Four Visits of Samuel Wolfe	Четыре визита Самюэля Вульфа	Aleksandr Stolper	Andrei Abrikosov	Drama	
Jolly Fellows	Весёлые ребята	Grigori Aleksandrov	Lyubov Orlova, Leonid Utyosov	Musical	
Lieutenant Kijé	Поручик Киже	Aleksandr Faintsimmer	Mikhail Yanshin	Comedy	
Marionettes	Марионетки	Yakov Protazanov	Sergei Martinson, Anatoli Ktorov, Nikolai Radin, Valentina Tokarskaya	Comedy	
A Petersburg Night	Петербургская ночь	Grigori Roshal, Vera Stroyeva	Lyubov Orlova	Drama	
The Private Life of Pyotr Vinogradov	Частная жизнь Петра Виноградова	Aleksandr Macheret	Boris Livanov	Comedy	
Three Songs About Lenin	Три песни о Ленине	Dziga Vertov		Documentary	

== See also ==
- 1934 in the Soviet Union
