= St. Jorgen's Day =

1930 film

- Official film poster
- Directed by: Yakov Protazanov
- Written by: Harald Bergstedt (novel); Yakov Protazanov (screenplay); Ilya Ilf, Yevgeni Petrov and Sigizmund Krzhizhanovsky (cues)
- Cinematography: Pyotr Yermolov
- Music by: Sergei Boguslavsky
- Release date: 1930
- Running time: 83 minutes
- Country: Soviet Union
- Languages: Russian; Part-talkie with Russian intertitles

St. Jorgen's Day, (Holiday of St. Jorgen, The Feast of St. Jorgen, Russian: Праздник Святого Йоргена, romanized: Prazdnik svyatogo Yorgena) is a 1930 Soviet, partly silent comedy film by Yakov Protazanov and starring Igor Ilyinsky.

Uncredited are the original novel by Harald Bergstedt, and the cues written by Ilf and Petrov (with the additional contribution of Sigizmund Krzhizhanovsky).

The film tells the story of a cunning thief impersonating a saint during a rigged religious festival, causing chaos among the clergy and authorities while plotting his escape with stolen wealth and newfound allies.

== Plot summary ==
The story takes place in a fictional European country on the eve of the religious festival of Saint Jorgen, the highlight of which is the selection of his "bride" who receives a significant monetary prize. The candidates for this role are relatives of clergymen, and the elections are rigged. The bishop, a high-ranking church official, promotes his own relative, Oleandra, for the position. To attract more parishioners, the bishop employs modern technology, commissioning a film titled The Life and Miracles of Saint Jorgen.

Meanwhile, the thief Korkis escapes from prison with the help of his accomplice, Schultz. On a train, Korkis meets Oleandra. Blending into a crowd of parishioners, the pair arrive at the church. Realizing how much money the clergy pocket, they plot to rob the church. Schultz creates a duplicate key, lets Korkis into the church, and locks the door behind him. However, Schultz is spotted by the police and pretends to be disabled to avoid suspicion.

When a church procession arrives unexpectedly, Korkis is caught off guard. Thinking quickly, he disguises himself as Saint Jorgen and steps out to greet the crowd. Asked to perform a miracle, he notices Schultz, "heals" him, and then forgives everyone’s sins free of charge. This causes an uproar among the clergy and authorities, who bribe the impostor to leave. Korkis, Oleandra, and Schultz flee the town together.

In the final scene, the bishop introduces a new saint, Franz, unveiling an icon depicting Schultz holding a crutch.

== Cast ==
- Igor Ilyinsky as Franz Schulz
- Anatoly Ktorov as Michael Korkis
- Mikhail Klimov as adjunct of the St. Jorgen church
- Ivan Arkadin as treasurer of St. Jorgen Church
- Mariya Strelkova as Oleandra
- Vladimir Uralsky as conductor of the railway
- Anatoly Goryunov as relic seller

== Credited crew ==
- Director: Yakov Protazanov
- Script: Yakov Protazanov, Vladimir Shveitser
- Operator: P. Yermolov
- Co-director: Porfiri Podobed
- Composer: Sergei Bugoslavsky
- Soundmaster: D. Blok
- Zvuk: S. Yurtsev, N. Ozornov
- Orchestra and chorus of Mezhrabpom-Film
- Tagefon sound system

== Part-talkie ==
Films from this period often combine silent and sound sequences.

Most of St. Jorgen's Day was shot without recorded sound. These sequences have Russian intertitles, an orchestral and choral score, and occasional sound effects (e.g. the sound of a hand knocking on a door) or added dialogue. A specific scene can use sound effects and intertitles together. The often-impressive exterior scenes were shot silent on location. Interspersed throughout the film are short indoor scenes with recorded sound. The opening credit sequence uses sound, with the principal performers speaking in costume as their characters.

== Quotes ==
- «The primary task for a thief profession and for a saint is to vanish at right time!»
- «Learn how to handle it without a jemmy!»
- When I was just an infant... My dear poor mother had dropped me from the ...nth floor...
- - Please, make one more miracle - an ascension!
  - And how about ascendables? (Korkis, talking about money)

== See also ==
- The Tailor from Torzhok
- The Three Million Trial
- A Kiss From Mary Pickford
