= Olga Zhizneva =

Soviet actress

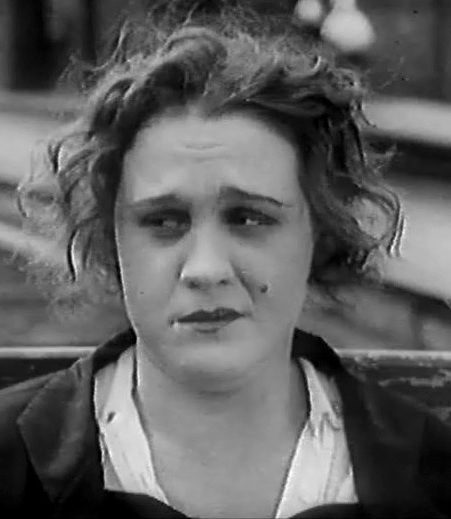
- Born: Olga Andreyevna Neumann; April 17, 1899; Saint Petersburg, Russian Empire
- Died: November 10, 1972 (aged 73); Moscow, Soviet Union
- Occupation: Actress
- Years active: 1925–1971
- Spouse: Abram Room

Olga Andreyevna Zhizneva (Russian: Ольга Андреевна Жизнева; April 17, 1899 – November 10, 1972) was a Soviet and Russian stage and film actress. People's Artist of the RSFSR (1969).

== Selected filmography ==
- Property of the Republic (1971) as Princess Tikhvinskaya
- Late Flowers (1969) as Princess Priklonskaya
- We'll Live Till Monday (1968) as Melnikov's Mother
- The Shield and the Sword (1968) as baroness
- An Unusual Summer (1957) as Vera Izvekova
- Admiral Ushakov (1953) as Empress Catherine II of Russia
- The Foundling (1939) as Natasha's mother
- The Three Million Trial (1926) as the banker's wife
- His Call (1925) as Lulu
- The Tailor from Torzhok (1925) as young lady

== See also ==
- Vera Kholodnaya
- Igor Ilyinsky
- Anel Sudakevich
