= Harald Bergstedt =

Danish writer

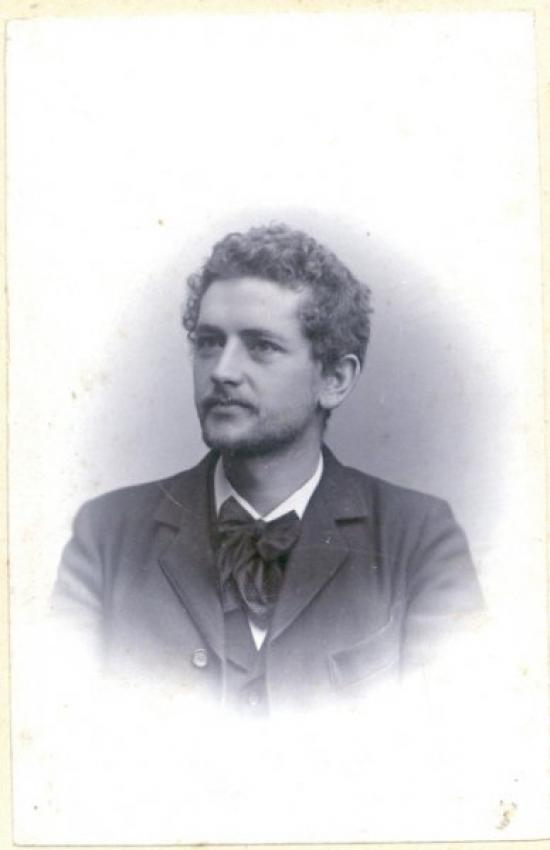
Harald Bergstedt, ca. 1910.

Harald Bergstedt (Harald Alfred Petersen; 10 August 1877 in Køge – 19 September 1965 in Copenhagen) was a Danish writer, novelist, playwright and a poet.

Author of the genre and satire verses (collections: Song of the province / Sange fra provinsen, 1913—1921; Wide Wings, 1919; Songs for all the Winds, 1927).

His social novel Alexandersen (1918) became a satire on a bourgeois culture.

His novel Factory of the Saints (1919, Russian translation 1924) became a prototype for Yakov Protazanov's 1930 film St. Jorgen's Day — a satire on the church and its ministers' hypocrisy.

Before the Second World War, he was a social democrat and was an immensely popular poet. Several still popular Danish children's songs have lyrics by Bergstedt ("Hør den lille stær", "Solen er så rød, mor", "Jeg ved en lærkerede"). In 1942-1945 during the German occupation of Denmark, he worked for a Nazi newspaper in Denmark, "Fædrelandet", and in 1946 was sentenced two years in prison for "cooperation with the Nazis". For this reason his songs was banned from being played on Danmarks Radio until 1963.

In 1948, he published a verse collection named Songs in the Jail with his thoughts on his life and works.
