= Sigizmund Krzhizhanovsky =

Russian and Soviet writer, playwright, philosopher, and historian (1887–1950)

- Сигизмунд Кржижановский
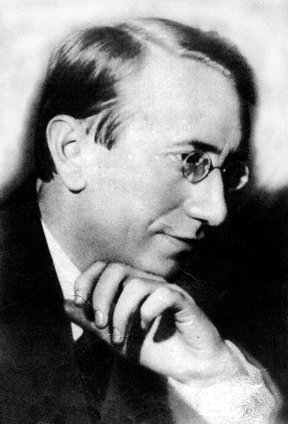
- Krzhizhanovsky, c. 1910
- Born: 11 February 1887; Kiev, Russian Empire
- Died: December 28, 1950 (aged 63); Moscow, Russian SFSR, Soviet Union

Sigizmund Dominikovich Krzhizhanovsky (Russian: Сигизмунд Доминикович Кржижановский, [sʲɪɡʲɪzˈmunt dəmʲɪˈnʲikəvʲɪtɕ kʐɨʐɨˈnofskʲɪj], (Note: The Russian Cyrillic transliteration of the Polish digraph [rz] is [рж]. Hence, the Russian transliteration retains the Polish-style pronunciation of this diagraph, namely /ʐ/.) Polish: Zygmunt Krzyżanowski; 11 February [O.S. 30 January] 1887 – 28 December 1950) was a Russian and Soviet writer, playwright, philosopher, and historian, who described himself as "known for being unknown". He published only nine stories and a few essays in his lifetime. The majority of his writings were published posthumously.

Krzhizhanovsky wrote screenplays for The Feast of St Jorgen (1929) by Yakov Protazanov and for the stop-motion animated feature film The New Gulliver (1935). He was left uncredited both times. He died in obscurity in 1950. A scholar discovered Krzhizhanovsky's archive in 1976, and started publishing his short stories in 1989. Posthumously, Krzhizhanovsky has gained fame for his short parables and phantasmagoric stories. At least one of them is noted for its Kafkaesque style.

== Life ==
Krzhizhanovsky was born in Kiev (now in Ukraine) to a Polish family on 11 February 1887.

Krzhizhanovsky was active among Moscow's literati in the 1920s, while working for Alexander Tairov's Chamber Theater. Several of Krzhizhanovsky's stories became known through private readings and a few publications. His writing style might have been influenced by Robert Louis Stevenson, G. K. Chesterton, Edgar Allan Poe, Nikolai Gogol, E. T. A. Hoffmann, and H. G. Wells.

In 1929 he penned a screenplay for Yakov Protazanov's acclaimed film The Feast of St Jorgen, yet his name did not appear in the credits. He also wrote the screenplay for the 1935 stop-motion animated feature film The New Gulliver, but, again, was left uncredited. One of his last short stories, "Дымчатый бокал" ("The Smoke-Colored Goblet," 1939), tells the story of a goblet miraculously never running out of wine, which is sometimes interpreted as a wry allusion to the author's fondness for alcohol.

Krzhizhanovsky died in Moscow, but his burial place is not known.

== Legacy ==
In 1976, scholar Vadim Perelmuter discovered Krzhizhanovsky's archive and in 1989 published one of his short stories. As the five volumes of his collected works followed, Krzhizhanovsky emerged from obscurity as a remarkable Soviet writer, who polished his prose to the verge of poetry. His short parables, written with an abundance of poetic detail and wonderful fertility of invention – though occasionally bordering on the whimsical – are sometimes compared to the ficciones of Jorge Luis Borges. "Quadraturin" (1926), the best known of such phantasmagoric stories, is a Kafkaesque tale in which allegory meets existentialism.

== Bibliography ==
=== Novellas ===
- Странствующее «Странно» (1924), Stravaging “Strange”. Included in the collection translated by Joanne Turnbull (Columbia University Press, 2023) ISBN 978-0-23119-947-6
- Клуб убийц букв (1926), The Letter Killers Club, trans. Joanne Turnbull (New York Review Books, 2011) ISBN 978-1-59017-450-0
- Возвращение Мюнхгаузена (1927-1928), The Return of Munchausen, trans. Joanne Turnbull (New York Review Books, 2016) ISBN 978-1-68137-028-6
- Материалы к биографии Горгиса Катафалаки (1929), Material for a Life of Gorgis Katafalaki. In Stravaging “Strange”, trans. Joanne Turnbull (Columbia University Press, 2023) ISBN 978-0-23119-947-6
- Воспоминания о будущем (written 1929; published 1989), Memories of the Future. Included in the collection translated by Joanne Turnbull (New York Review Books, 2009) ISBN 978-1-59017-319-0

=== Short story collections ===
- Сказки для вундеркиндов (1919-1927), Fairy-tales for Wunderkinder
- Чужая тема (1927-1931), Someone Else's Theme
- Чем люди мертвы (1932-1933), What Men Die By
- Неукушенный локоть (Рассказы о Западе) (1940), Unbitten Elbow
- Мал мала меньше (1937-1940), One Smaller Than the Other
- Сборник рассказов 1920-1940-х годов (1940), Collected Stories: 1920s-1940s

=== Plays ===
- That Third Guy: A Comedy from the Stalinist 1930s with Essays on Theater, trans. Alisa Ballard Lin (The University of Wisconsin Press, 2018) ISBN 978-0-29931-710-2

=== Essays and stories published in his lifetime ===
- Якоби и „Якобы“ (1919), Jacobi and 'As If'
- Штемпель: Москва (1925), Postmark: Moscow. In Autobiography of a Corpse, trans. Joanne Turnbull (New York Review Books, 2013) ISBN 978-1-59017-670-2
- Поэтика заглавий (1931), "The Poetics of Titles", trans. Anne O. Fisher, in Countries That Don't Exist: Selected Nonfiction, edited by Jacob Emery and Alexander Spektor (Columbia University Press, 2022) ISBN 978-0-23120-237-4

=== Translated stories and collections ===
- "Quadraturin", trans. Joanne Turnbull, in Russian Short Stories from Pushkin to Buida (Penguin, 2005) ISBN 978-0-140-44846-7
- 7 Stories, trans. Joanne Turnbull (GLAS New Russian Writing, 2006) ISBN 5-7172-0073-0
- Memories of the Future, trans. Joanne Turnbull (New York Review Books, 2009) ISBN 978-1-59017-319-0
- Autobiography of a Corpse, trans. Joanne Turnbull (New York Review Books, 2013) ISBN 978-1-59017-670-2
- Unwitting Street, trans. Joanne Turnbull (New York Review Books, 2020) ISBN 978-1-68137-488-8
- Countries That Don't Exist: Selected Nonfiction, edited by Jacob Emery and Alexander Spektor (Columbia University Press, 2022) ISBN 978-0-23120-237-4
- Stravaging “Strange”, trans. Joanne Turnbull (Columbia University Press, 2023) ISBN 978-0-23119-947-6
