= Sergey Martinson =

Soviet actor (1899–1984)

- Сергей Мартинсон
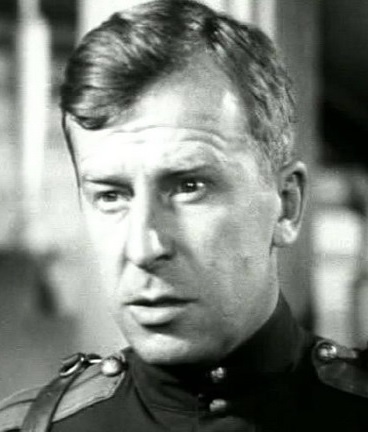
- Born: Sergey Aleksandrovich Martinson; 6 February [O.S. 25 January] 1899; Saint Petersburg, Russia
- Died: 2 September 1984 (aged 85); Moscow, Soviet Union
- Occupation: Actor
- Years active: 1923–1984

Sergey Aleksandrovich Martinson (Russian: Сергей Александрович Мартинсон; 6 February [O.S. 25 January] 1899 – 2 September 1984) was a Soviet and Russian stage, film and voice actor. He received the title of People's Artist of the RSFSR (1964).

== Biography ==
He was born in Saint Petersburg into a family of Swedish and Russian descent. His parents adored theater and took their son to many performances. As a schoolboy, Sergey played in a theatrical studio.

After one year of education in the Technological institute, he decided to become a professional actor. At the entrance exams he read Boris Godunov's monologue from Pushkin's play. The exam board roared with laughter, but refused to accept him. He later joined the theatrical institute from a second attempt.

Martinson worked in several theaters. From 1924 to 1941, he played in the Theatre of the Revolution. From 1925 to 1926, 1929 to 1933, and 1937 to 1938, he was the leading actor of Vsevolod Meyerhold's theatre. He was cast by Meyerhold in the plays The Government Inspector, Mandate and others. From 1933 to 1936, he worked in the music hall.

He married his first wife, Yekaterina Ilyinichna Ilyina (1900, St. Petersburg – 1985, New York), an actress, in 1927, whom he met during his acting studies; their daughter, Anna (1928 – 2012, New York), later a successful artist and costume designer, married the Russian conductor and violist Rudolf Barshai (1924–2010). Although they had never officially divorced, he married his second wife, dancer Lola Dobrokhotova, who was later exiled by the government for alleged connections to "foreign elements" and died in exile; they had a son, Aleksandr (1939–2003). His third wife, Luisa (1929–2018), was a woman 30 years junior to Martinson. They had a daughter, Natasha (born 1956) and divorced several years later.

== Filmography ==
=== Films ===
- The Adventures of Oktyabrina (1924) – Coolidge Kerzonovich Poincaré
- The Devil's Wheel (1926) – Orchestra conductor
- Little Brother (1927) – Trust director
- The Deserter (1933) – Passerby
- Marionettes (1934) – G, the Barber
- Revolt of the Fishermen (1934) – Herr Bredel, fishing magnate
- Loss of Sensation (1935) – Dizer, music hall artist
- Treasure Island (1937) – Bradley
- The Oppenheim Family (1938) – Gutwetter, poet
- Stepan Razin (1939) – Fyodor Shpyn
- The Golden Key (1939) – Duremar
- Anton Ivanovich Is Angry (1941) – Kerosinov, composer
- We from the Urals (1943) – Dance club manager
- Silva (1944) – Count Boni
- The Wedding (1944) – Ivan Mikhailovich Yat, telegrapher
- Secret Agent (1947) – Willi Pommer
- The Third Blow (1948) – Adolf Hitler
- Przhevalsky (1951) – Andrei Ivanovich Shatilo, professor
- Sadko (1952) – Inok
- Attack from the Sea (1953) – Ferdinand I of the Two Sicilies
- Ilya Muromets (1956) – Boyar Mishatychka
- A Crazy Day (1956) – Miusov
- The Idiot (1958) – Lebedev
- Scarlet Sails (1961) – Philip, coal miner
- The Night Before Christmas (1961) – Osip Nikiforovich, diak
- Wind of Freedom (1961) – Innkeeper
- Funny Stories (1962) – Lyuska the dog's owner
- Tale about the Boy-Kibalchish (1964) – Agent 518
- Tale About the Lost Time (1964) – Prokofy Prokofyevich the Evil Wizard
- Thirty Three (1965) – Valentin Petrovich, Rozochka's father
- The Tale of Tsar Saltan (1966) – Saltan's guardian
- The Beautiful Girl (1969) – Lonely old man with cane
- Ruslan and Ludmila (1972) – Byzantine ambassador
- Armed and Dangerous (1977) – Mr. Trott
- The New Adventures of Captain Wrongel (1978) – Sir Vant, bandit leader
- The Hound of the Baskervilles (1981) – Mr. Frankland
- And Life, and Tears, and Love (1983) – Yegoshkin

=== Voice acting ===
- The Lost Letter (1945) – Witch
- The Enchanted Boy (1955) – Rat leader
- The Snow Queen (1957) – The Raven
- The Adventures of Buratino (1959) – Mantis the Doctor
- It Was I Who Drew the Little Man (1960) – Chalk-drawn Little Man / Eight-legged creature
- Cipollino (1961) – Prince Lemon / One of Lemon's soldiers
- The Key (1961) – Zmei Gorynych's second head
- The Wild Swans (1962) – Monk
- Adventures of Mowgli (1967–1971) – Tabaqui
