= A Crazy Day =

- Russian: Безумный день
- Directed by: Andrey Tutyshkin
- Written by: Valentin Kataev
- Starring: Igor Ilyinsky; Sergey Martinson; Serafima Birman; Anastasiya Georgievskaya; Rostislav Plyatt; Irina Zarubina
- Cinematography: Konstantin Petrichenko
- Edited by: Lyudmila Pechieva
- Music by: Nikita Bogoslovskiy
- Production company: Mosfilm
- Release date: 1956
- Running time: 67 min.
- Country: Soviet Union
- Language: Russian

A Crazy Day (Russian: Безумный день) is a 1956 Soviet musical comedy film directed by Andrey Tutyshkin.

== Plot ==
The manager wants the creche to open on time and he is ready to do everything possible for this. But the trouble is: the bureaucrat does not want to put the resolution necessary for this on the last working day. To achieve his goal, the manager will pretend to be another person.

== Cast ==
- Igor Ilyinsky as Zajtsev
- Sergey Martinson as Miusov
- Serafima Birman as Doctor
- Anastasiya Georgievskaya as sister-mistress
- Rostislav Plyatt as Dudkin
- Irina Zarubina as Dudkina
- Vladimir Volodin as door-keeper
- Nina Doroshina as Shura
- Igor Gorbachyov as Konstantin Galushkin
- Olga Aroseva as Miusov's Secretary
- Zinaida Naryshkina as old typist
- Sergei Blinnikov as client
- Tamara Loginova as Klava Ignatyuk
