= Girl Friends (1936 film) =

- Directed by: Lev Arnshtam
- Written by: Lev Arnshtam; Nikolai Tikhonov; Raisa Vasilyeva
- Produced by: Adrian Piotrovsky
- Starring: Zoya Fyodorova; Yanina Zhejmo; Irina Zarubina
- Cinematography: Vladimir Rapoport; Arkadi Shafran
- Edited by: Tonka Taldy
- Music by: Dmitri Shostakovich
- Production company: Lenfilm
- Release date: 19 February 1936
- Running time: 2,611 meters (95 minutes)
- Country: Soviet Union
- Language: Russian

Girl Friends (Russian: Подруги, romanized: Podrugi) is a 1936 Soviet war romance film, directorial debut of Lev Arnshtam. The film tells story of the friendship among three girls from Petrograd who grow up together and become nurses during the Russian Civil War. The film was released in the US in 1936 as Three Women.

== Cast ==
- Zoya Fyodorova - Zoya
- Yanina Zhejmo - Asya
- Irina Zarubina - Natasha
- Boris Chirkov - Senka
- Boris Babochkin - Andrei
- Nikolay Cherkasov - White Army officer
- Vasili Merkuryev
- Boris Blinov
- Maria Blumenthal-Tamarina
- Pavel Volkov
- Stepan Kayukov
- Stepan Krylov
- Boris Poslavsky
- Serafima Birman
- I. Antipova
- D. Pape
- Varvara Popova
- Vera Popova
- Pavel Sukhanov
