= Serafima Birman =

Soviet and Russian actress, theatre director and writer

- Серафима Бирман
- Born: 10 August 1890; Kishinyov, Bessarabia Governorate, Russian Empire
- Died: 11 May 1976 (aged 85); Leningrad, Russian SFSR, Soviet Union
- Resting place: Novodevichy Cemetery
- Occupations: Actress; theatre director
- Years active: 1911–1972
- Spouse: Alexander Talanov

Serafima Germanovna Birman (Russian: Серафима Германовна Бирман; 10 August [O.S. 29 July] 1890 – 11 May 1976) was a Soviet Russian actress, theatre director and writer. She was named People’s Artist of the RSFSR in 1946.

== Biography ==
Serafima Birman was born in Kishinyov in the Russian Empire (modern-day Chișinău, Moldova) into a Russian Orthodox family. Her father German Mikhailovich Birman was a Stabs-kapitan who served in the 51st reserve infantry battalion of the Imperial Russian Army. He came from raznochintsy, but was granted personal nobility after making a successful military career. He resigned rather early and died in 1908. Serafima described him as a "lonely, unsociable man... who had little success at finishing things, like the Moldovan-Russian dictionary he was writing for years". Her mother Elena Ivanovna Birman (née Botezat) "was a complete opposite". She came from a wealthy Moldovan family, studied in a finishing school and married as a teenager. At the time German met and married her, she was already a 19-year-old widow with two daughters. Serafima also had a younger brother, Nikolai.

=== Theatre ===
She grew up in Kishinyov and graduated from a local gymnasium for girls with a gold medal. At the age of 11 she visited a theatre and became obsessed with it. One of her stepsisters, then a student at the Saint Petersburg medical university, was offered to play a small part in Konstantin Stanislavski's play. She brought Serafima a signed photo of him and suggested to enter the Moscow Art Theatre. In 1908 she left for Moscow and entered drama courses led by Alexander Adashev; among her fellow students was Evgeny Vakhtangov. Konstantin Fyodorovich Kazimir, a well-known Bessarabian State Duma deputy and philanthropist, supported her and paid for the first year of studying.

In 1911 Birman graduated from the courses and became an actress of the Moscow Art Theatre with the help of Vasily Kachalov, one of her teachers who sent a recommendation letter straight to Vladimir Nemirovich-Danchenko. From 1913 on she also performed at the First Studio led by Stanislavski. She played her first big role of Ortensia in the 1914 adaptation of The Mistress of the Inn play. In 1924 the First Studio was turned into the Moscow Art Theatre II by its actors led by Michael Chekhov. Same year Birman debuted as a theatre director with Love – A Golden Book, an adaptation of Aleksey Tolstoy's play. After a number of internal conflicts the theatre was finally closed in 1936.

Birman and other actors then joined the Mossovet Theatre where she continued staging plays. One of her biggest successes was Maxim Gorky's Vassa Zheleznova where she also performed in the main part which she considered the role of her life. In 1938 one of the actors Ivan Bersenyev founded the Lenin Komsomol Theatre and invited some of the leading Mossovet actors to join him, including Birman. In 1943 she relaunched Vassa Zheleznova and directed other adaptations of classic plays such as Leo Tolstoy's The Living Corpse and Edmond Rostand's Cyrano de Bergerac. She served there until 1958 and then returned to the Mossovet Theatre where she stayed for the rest of her life.

She also published articles and several non-fiction books dedicated to her profession and Russian theatre in general: Actor and Character (1934), Actor's Labour (1939), The Path of an Actress (1959 and 1962), Meetings Granted by Fate (1971).

=== Cinema ===
Birman's first roles in cinema date back to 1918: she played a small part in But He, Rebellious, Seeks for Tempest... crime drama and Lady Sophia Entwistle in the Buried Alive adaptation of Arnold Bennett's satirical book. Both films were directed by Alexandre Volkoff shortly before his emigration and are considered to be lost today. She returned to big screen during the mid-1920s and played several comedy roles and episodes in a number of silent films, most notably a neighbor in Yakov Protazanov's The Tailor from Torzhok (1925) and Madame Irène in Boris Barnet's The Girl with a Hatbox (1927). Her unusual appearance and expressive acting attracted comedy directors: between 1956 and 1957 she played two memorable grotesque characters in Andrey Tutishkin's Crazy Day and Alexander Stolbov's An Ordinary Man. She also voiced some animated films.

Yet her biggest success came with Ivan the Terrible directed by Sergei Eisenstein in 1944 during the war. Birman played the main antagonist – Yefrosinya Staritskaya, mother of Vladimir of Staritsa – who wanted to see him as a new Russian Tsar and led the plot against Ivan the Terrible. Eisenstein first planned Faina Ranevskaya for this part, but she was rejected by censors supposedly because of her "openly Semitic features". Either way, Birman's character has been widely praised since. In 1946 she was awarded the Stalin Prize and the rank of People's Artist of the RSFSR for it. Same year the second part The Boyars' Plot was finished where she reprised the role of Yefrosinya, although the film was met with harsh criticism and banned for 12 years.

=== Death ===
In 1969 Birman's husband Alexander Talanov, a Russian writer and journalist, died of illness aged 68. Serafima took his death hard. She soon became mentally ill and left the theatre. She was taken by her relatives to Leningrad where she went through treatment in mental hospitals until her death in 1976. As one of her close friends Rostislav Plyatt wrote in his memoirs, "She tried to stage The Blue Bird with her ward neighbors, hasting to demonstrate the work to her beloved Stanislavski! Irrepressible, she even died Birman-style – no day without theatre!.." She was buried at the Novodevichy Cemetery in Moscow near her husband. While biographers usually state the couple was childless, according to the actor Stanislav Sadalsky Birman actually left some descendants.

== Selected filmography ==
Year	Title	Role	Notes
1925	The Tailor from Torzhok	Shirinkina's neighbor	
1926	The Three Million Trial	a lady with a rose	uncredited
1927	The Girl with a Hatbox	Madame Irène	
1927	The End of St. Petersburg	a lady with a fan	uncredited
1936	Girl Friends		uncredited
1938	Friends	Mussa's mother	
1938	A Man with a Gun	Varvara Ivanovna	
1941	Valery Chkalov	American woman	uncredited
1944	Ivan the Terrible	Efrosinia Staritskaya	
1946	Ivan the Terrible. Part II: The Boyars' Plot	Efrosinia Staritskaya	
1956	Crazy Day	Dr. Anna Pavlovna	
1957	Don Quixote	housekeeper	
1957	An Ordinary Man	aunt Constance Lvovna	
1960	It Was I Who Drew the Little Man	voice only	animation
1965	Rikki-Tikki-Tavi	Chuchundra/Nagaina (voice only)	animation
