= Varvara Popova =

Soviet stage and film actress

- Born: Varvara Aleksandrovna Popova; 17 December 1899; Moscow, Russian Empire
- Died: 31 October 1988 (aged 88); Moscow, Soviet Union
- Occupation: Actor
- Years active: 1925–1972

Varvara Aleksandrovna Popova (Russian: Варвара Александровна Попова) (17 December 1899 - 31 October 1988) was a Soviet stage and film actress. She appeared in early silent films by Yakov Protazanov and Mikhail Doller, but most of her credits date from the 1960s, when she was in demand for character roles, generally as a grandmother, peasant woman, etc. She appeared in several fairy-tale films by Aleksandr Rou. For many years she was a member of the company of the Vakhtangov Theatre.

== Selected filmography ==
- 1925 - His Call - Katya Sushkova
- 1957 - The Snow Queen (1957 film) - Granny
- 1963 - Fitil - Old woman on the pier
- 1964 - The Chairman - Samokhina
- 1964 - Jack Frost - Old blind woman
- 1965 - Time, Forward! - Old woman in the hut
- 1967 - Woman's World - Komarikha
- 1969 - The Brothers Karamazov - Matryona
- 1969 - Barbara the Fair with the Silken Hair - Stepanida
- 1973 - The Golden Horns - Grandmother Anastasia
