= The Fountain of Bakhchisaray (film) =

- Russian: Бахчисарайский фонтан
- Directed by: Yakov Protazanov
- Written by: Yakov Protazanov; Alexander Pushkin (poem)
- Produced by: Alexander Drankov
- Starring: Vladimir Shaternikov; Maria Korolyova; E. Uvarova
- Cinematography: Giovanni Vitrotti
- Release date: 1909
- Country: Russian Empire

The Fountain of Bakhchisaray (Russian: Бахчисарайский фонтан, romanized: Bakhchisarayskiy fontan) is a 1909 Russian short drama film directed by Yakov Protazanov. It is a lost film.

== Plot ==
The Crimean Khan Giray brings a girl Maria to the harem, which causes jealousy of Zarema, who loves Khan more than anything else. Zarema speaks about this to Maria, who is eager for freedom and understands that this is possible only after death. Khan, when he learns of Maria's death, gives the order to execute Zarema and build a fountain of tears.

== Cast ==
- Vladimir Shaternikov as khan
- Maria Korolyova as Zarema
- E. Uvarova
