= Irina Zarubina =

Soviet actress

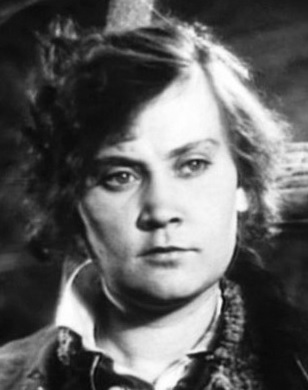
- Born: Irina Petrovna Zarubina; April 22, 1907; Kazan, Kazan Governorate, Russian Empire
- Died: May 20, 1976 (aged 69); Leningrad, RSFSR, Soviet Union
- Occupation: Actress

Irina Petrovna Zarubina (Russian: Ири́на Петро́вна Зару́бина; April 22, 1907 – May 20, 1976) was a Soviet and Russian actress. People's Artist of the RSFSR (1951).

== Biography ==
She was born on April 22, 1907, in Kazan.

In 1929, she graduated from the Russian State Institute of Performing Arts, after which she worked at the Leningrad Theater of the Proletcult.

In 1935, she joined the Leningrad Comedy Theater.

She died on May 20, 1976. She was buried at Komarovsky cemetery in Saint Petersburg.

== Filmography ==
- The Storm (1933) – Varvara Kabanova
- House of Greed (1933) – Yevpraksiya
- Girl Friends (1936) – Natasha
- Friends (1938) – Vera
- Peter the Great (1938) – Afrosinya
- Gorky 2: My Apprenticeship (1939) – Natalya
- Vasilisa the Beautiful (1940) – Malanya Savvichna
- Valery Chkalov (1941) – Actress
- Two Friends (1954) – Olga Nikolayevna, teacher
- A Crazy Day (1956) – Zoya Valentinovna Dudkina
- Different Fortunes (1956) – Stepan Ogurtsov's aunt
- The Captain's Daughter (1958) – Vasilisa Yegorovna
- Alyonka (1961) – Vasilisa Petrovna
- The First Trolleybus (1963) – Trolleybus passenger
- Three Fat Men (1966) – Accompanist
- Village Detective (1969) – Praskovya Pankova, milkmaid
