= Iosif Tolchanov =

Soviet actor

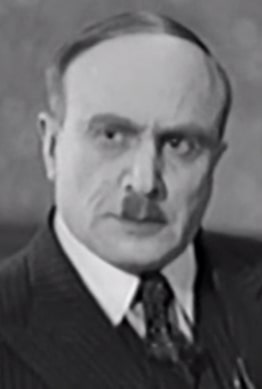
- Tolchanov in 1938
- Born: Starkovsky; 11 April 1891; Moscow, Russian Empire
- Died: 24 August 1981 (aged 90); Moscow, Russian SFSR, Soviet Union
- Occupation: Actor
- Years active: 1924–1980

Iosif Tolchanov (Russian: Иосиф Толчанов) was a Soviet actor. He was named an Honored Artist of the USSR in 1962.

== Biography ==
Iosif was born on 11 May 1891 in Moscow. From 1911 to 1914 he studied at the University of Liège in Belgium, after which he entered the Mamonov Studio in Moscow. In 1918 he became a member of the Vakhtangov studio. In 1920 he began teaching, he worked in an Uzbek theater studio, in the Yakutsk GITIS studio, in the Shchukin Theater School.

== Selected filmography ==
- 1924 — Aelita
- 1925 — The Tailor from Torzhok
- 1939 — Lenin in 1918
- 1953 — Attack from the Sea
