= A Kiss from Mary Pickford =

1927 film by Sergei Komarov

A Kiss From Mary Pickford
- Movie poster
- Directed by: Sergei Komarov
- Starring: Igor Ilyinsky; Anel Sudakevich; Mary Pickford; Douglas Fairbanks; Vera Malinovskaya
- Cinematography: Sergei Komarov
- Distributed by: Mezhrabpom-Rus
- Release date: 9 September 1927
- Running time: 6 reels
- Country: Soviet Union
- Language: Silent (Russian intertitles)

A Kiss from Mary Pickford

A Kiss From Mary Pickford (Russian: Поцелуй Мэри Пикфорд, romanized: Potseluy Meri Pikford) is a 1927 Soviet silent comedy film made and directed by Sergei Komarov and co-written by Komarov and Vadim Shershenevich. The film, starring Igor Ilyinsky, is mostly known today because of a cameo by popular American film couple Mary Pickford and Douglas Fairbanks, who play themselves. The scenes featuring the couple were shot during their visit to the USSR. A legend claims that Pickford and Fairbanks did not know that footage of them would be used in a Soviet fiction film. In reality, the couple knowingly participated to the project as a gesture towards the Russian film industry.

A print of the film still exists and is preserved at the Library of Congress. The film was shown during the Berlin International Film Festival in February 1991 and at San Francisco Silent Film Festival Winter Festival at the Castro Theatre in February 2009.

== Plot ==
Goga Palkin is a theatre check-taker in love with a beginner actress named Dusya. She has a crush on Douglas Fairbanks and only wants to date someone famous like a Hollywood star. After a chance meeting and a kiss from Mary Pickford, Goga becomes a local celebrity, and a lot of girls chase him through the streets. The popularity of her admirer makes Dusya jealous, and she falls for him.

== Cast ==
- Igor Ilyinsky as Goga Palkin
- Anel Sudakevich as Dusya Galkina
- Abram Room
- Mary Pickford as herself (cameo)
- Douglas Fairbanks as himself (cameo)
- Vera Malinovskaya as herself (cameo)
- Vasili Bokarev as a young man
- Olga Bazanova (appearing)
- Vera Marinich (appearing, uncredited)

== See also ==
- The Three Million Trial
- The Tailor from Torzhok
