= The White Eagle =

1928 film

- Directed by: Yakov Protazanov
- Written by: Oleg Leonidov; Yakov Protazanov; Yakov Urinov
- Based on: The Governor, a 1906 short story by Leonid Andreyev
- Starring: Vasili Kachalov; Anna Sten; Vsevolod Meyerhold
- Cinematography: Pyotr Yermolov
- Production company: Mezhrabpomfilm
- Release date: 9 October 1928
- Running time: 67 minutes
- Country: Soviet Union
- Languages: Silent; Russian intertitles

The White Eagle (Russian: Белый орёл, romanized: Belyy oryol) is a 1928 Soviet silent historical drama film directed by Yakov Protazanov and starring Vasili Kachalov, Anna Sten and Vsevolod Meyerhold. Set in Tsarist times, it is based on the short story The Governor (1906) by Leonid Andreyev.

== Plot ==
The White Eagle (1928)

The film takes place in 1905. Governor-liberal attempts to prevent a strike in the city but the workers refuse to obey. The governor gives an order to shoot the strikers and suppresses the uprising with force while children die in the crossfire. As a reward, he is represented with the order of "White Eagle", but the governor is haunted by pangs of conscience.

== Cast ==
- Vasili Kachalov as Governor
- Anna Sten as Governor's wife
- Vsevolod Meyerhold as Dignitary
- Ivan Chuvelyov
- Andrey Petrovsky as Chief of Police
- Pyotr Repnin as Bishop
- Ye. Volkonskaya
- Mikhail Zharov
- Yuri Vasilchikov
- Aleksandr Gromov as Revolutionary

== Bibliography ==
- Christie, Ian & Taylor, Richard. The Film Factory: Russian and Soviet Cinema in Documents 1896-1939. Routledge, 2012.
