= The New Gulliver =

- Soviet theatrical poster
- Directed by: Aleksandr Ptushko
- Written by: Sigizmund Krzhizhanovsky (uncredited); Aleksandr Ptushko; Grigori Roshal
- Based on: Gulliver's Travels by: Jonathan Swift
- Starring: Vladimir Konstantinovich Konstantinov (Gulliver); Ivan Yudin; Shaolin Santiago (unconfirmed)
- Cinematography: Nikolai Renkov
- Music by: Lev Shvarts
- Production company: Mosfilm
- Distributed by: Gosudarstvennoe Upravlenie Kinematografii i fotografii (1935-Soviet Union); Serlin-Burstyn (1935-US); Artkino Pictures (1940-Argentina); Sovexportfilm (1948-Austria)
- Release date: 25 March 1935
- Running time: 75 min
- Country: Soviet Union
- Language: Russian

The New Gulliver (Russian: Новый Гулливер, Novyy Gullivyer) is a Soviet stop motion-animated fantasy adventure film. It was the first to make such extensive use of puppet animation, running almost all the way through the film (it begins and ends with short live-action sequences). The film was released in 1935 to widespread acclaim and earned director Aleksandr Ptushko a special prize at the International Cinema Festival in Milan. The part of Gulliver was played by Vladimir Konstantinov, who was born in 1920 and died in 1944 near Tallinn in the Second World War. This was his first and only film role.

== Plot ==
The story, a Communist re-telling of the 1726 novel Gulliver's Travels by Jonathan Swift, is about a young boy who dreams of himself as a version of Gulliver who has landed in Lilliput suffering under capitalist inequality and exploitation.

The pioneer Petya Konstantinov (Vladimir Konstantinov), as an award for the best young OSVOD member of Artek, receives his favorite book — Gulliver's Travels by Jonathan Swift. Together with other pioneers who repaired the sailboat "Artek" with their own hands, he goes on for a walk to the Adalara's islands which are near the summer camp. There, during vacation, children ask the leader to read them aloud Petya's book. Petya falls asleep while reading and finds himself in the world described in the book.

In the dream, Petya travels by ship, but during sailing, his vessel is attacked by pirates. Together with three captives, the boy fights with them and wins, but at this moment, the pirate ship crashes into the rocks. The teenager recovers ashore, surrounded and tied up by Liliputians. He is put to sleep with a potion. At this time in the parliament, there is a debate on what to do with the new Gulliver. Ministers on behalf of the king make the decision to use Gulliver for military purposes. The boy is transported to the city by means of 15 tractors and a special platform. Petya is awoken by the king who puts a sceptre up to his nose. He learns about the decision which was made by the parliament, but disagrees with it. After that under his feet a military parade passes.

At this time, somewhere in cellars, a meeting of workers passes. Strike is appointed next day. The workers decide to find out who he is and find Petya's notebook on Russian language from which they learn that he is for the mighty union of workers from all around the world.

Petya is fed from the conveyor, with a crane being used to feed him. The whole Royal Court is present, and the corps de ballet performs. When they start singing to him how well people live under the leadership of the wise king, Petya interrupts the singer and starts singing the pioneer song. It is picked up by workers in the cellars. The court disperses in horror.

The police chief decides to kill Petya, and instructs employees of the underground plant to make a batch of weapons. The workers warn him, and the police learns about it immediately, but at this time, strike already begins. Workers take over the arsenal. The police tries to poison the boy, but he doesn't swallow the poison and spits it out, having pretended that he has died. Military operations begin. Insurgents are thrown to the sea by armed forces of Liliputia, but Petya goes into action, he seizes the royal ships. Workers on the earth develop success, undermine land mines and tanks. The guard and the court runs away. The king does not manage to hold on to the tower and, when falling, seizes an arrow of the tower clock. Petya blows in the horn which inexplicably appears in his hands, removes the bell from the city tower belfry and then shakes it in a manner of a hand bell. Then he proclaims: "The meeting of free Liliputiya I declare open!" and wakes up from the laughter of companions as he said the last phrase aloud.

== Creators ==
	English	Russian
Scenario	Grigory Roshal; Alexander Ptushko	Григорий Рошаль; Александр Птушко
Directing	Directed by the honored artist of the republic A. L. Ptushko	Постановка заслуженного артиста республики А. Л. Птушко
The director of photography	N. S. Renkov	Н. С. Ренков
The operator	I. Shkarenkov	И. Шкаренков
The artist of dolls	Sarrah Mokil	Сарра Мокиль
The artist of scenery	Y. Shvets	Ю. Швец
Sculpture	Olga Tayozhnaya	Ольга Таёжная
Painting	A. Nikulin	А. Никулин
Properties	A. Zharenov	А. Жаренов
The composer	Lev Shvarts	Лев Шварц
The sound technician	A. Korobov	А. Коробов
The text of songs	Samuil Bolotin	Самуил Болотин
The chief of group	A. Minin	А. Минин
Animator	Fyodor Krasniy (in credits it isn't specified)	Фёдор Красный (в титрах не указан)

== Awards ==
- 1934 — the 2nd International film festival in Venice, the award "For the Best Program"
- 1935 — the International film festival in Moscow, the certificate of honor of Mosfilm studio
- The certificate of honor Sarr Mokil "For expressive types"

== History ==
After experimenting with various animation techniques from 1928 to 1932, including the combination of puppets and live action in the same frame, Ptushko (along with the animation crew he had assembled over the years) began work on his first feature film. Written and directed by Ptushko, The New Gulliver was one of the first feature-length films to combine stop-motion animation with live-action footage (one of the first were made by Willis O'Brien, who was responsible for The Lost World and King Kong).

After the film's success, Ptushko was allowed by Mosfilm to set up his own department, which became known as "the Ptushko Collective," for the making of stop-motion animated films. This group of filmmakers would produce another fourteen animated shorts from 1936 to 1938, and a new feature, The Golden Key, in 1939.

== "My Liliputian-Girl" ==
In the children's movie, there was also a place of the parody to the song of the impresario Fo-Lya "My Liliputian-Girl" (the text — Samuil Bolotin, music — Lev Schvarts) became a classic, alongside Vertinsky's songs which it parodied. The song goes:

My liliputian-girl, come to me,
We will stay minute alone!
With you it is careless as a bird, I will be turned,
My liliputian-girl, my dream!
My liliputian-girl, my love,
Having mixed words, I sing without words:
"La-la-la-la-la, la-la-la, la-la-la-la-la-la!"
My liliputian-girl, my dream!

== Technique ==
The New Gulliver featured 3,000 different puppets. Each of the puppets had a detachable head, which made them capable of a wide range of expressions and personality. A live actor and mechanically operated puppets were used in some shots, while in others, both the Lilliputians and the boy were animated puppets (a full-size puppet of the boy was constructed).

The main puppet characters (the Abbott, the Dandy, the Financier, the King, the Chief of Police, the Prime Minister) had, according to Ptushko, "from two to three hundred interchangeable heads with various facial expressions".

== Production ==
- Many scenes in which dolls and the living actor participated, were removed frame by frame, as usual animation movies. Thus it was necessary to the actor not to move for a long time while phases of the movement of dolls were removed.
- When scoring animated part of the movie Liliputians spoke by the accelerated voices of adults. Petya, on the contrary, spoke the slowed-down teenager's voice.
- Figures of capitalists were molded in the spirit of posters of those times: ugly, big-bellied, on thin legs. At the same time each figure was peculiar, individual. Figures of workers were less ugly, but all are stuck together on one template, from plasticine, on a wire framework. Their figures entirely from one-color material, with well traced lines of persons, but thus it is impossible even to understand, whether there are shirts on them.
- In the movie eras sometimes mix up:
  - capitalists drive about in cars, but in ancient wigs;
  - Fo-Lya is represented in a dress coat, but wears the fitting leggings and a wig;
  - soldiers use gas masks, but are dressed in armor (though in general their silhouettes reminds the French soldiers of the end of World War I — the Intermilitary period).
  - The chief of secret police is dressed in a "musketeer's" suit of the 17th century, with jack boots and a wide hat with a feather, and the first minister already of fashion of the beginning of the 18th century — in a wig, a camisole and drawers. At the same time police officers are dressed as classic English "bobbies" — in raincoats, capes and high helmets, and firefighters are equipped in the form typical for the first half of the 20th century and the 1930s.
- Small mistake: though Petya in a dream was in English clothes, at it found a matchbox, the member book of Osvodovets and a notebook on the native language, all with inscriptions in Russian. Liliputians, certainly, both read and speak Russian, all resolutions and decrees are also in Russian. But on an arsenal "ARSENAL" (Latin script) is written.
- Ilya Ilf and Evgeny Petrov mention in the book One-storey America that during a walk on Broadway they saw New Gulliver in an American cinema.

== Reception ==
Writing for The Spectator in 1936, Graham Greene gave the film a good review, commenting that "even if the theme seems to us a little dusty, [...] the execution and invention awake our admiration". Comparing the story to Alice in Wonderland, Greene notes that "there are moments of delightful satire", and praises "the marvellous ingenuity of the puppets [as] beyond praise. One soon begins to regard them as real people and to give critical applause to the performers."

Charlie Chaplin gave high praise to the movie. Czech directors, founders of Czech animation Karel Zeman, Jiri Trnka and Hermina Tyrlova acknowledged the influence of the film on their work. The New Gulliver "served as an example of the innovative use of the possibilities of the animated screen, and in particular the art of the film puppet, an immediate inspirational impulse in the work".

== Video release ==
At the beginning of the 1990s, the movie was released on videotapes by the film association "Krupnyy Plan". At the beginning of the 2000s, it was reissued on VHS by the Master Teyp company.

On 10 March 2005, the movie was released on DVD by Soyuz Video studio. Restored versions of the movie on DVD were also issued by the Retro-klub, Vostok V, Videobaza and Music-treyd company.
