= Anatoly Ktorov =

Soviet actor (1898–1980)

- Анатолий Кторов
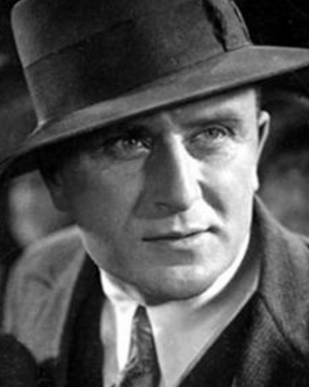
- Born: Anatoly Petrovich Viktorov; 24 April 1898 [O.S. 12 April] Moscow, Russian Empire
- Died: 30 September 1980 (aged 82); Moscow, Russian SFSR, Soviet Union
- Occupation: Actor
- Years active: 1920–1980

Anatoly Petrovich Ktorov (Note: Russian: Анатолий Петрович Кторов, romanized: Anatoly Petrovich Ktorov) (24 April 1898 [O.S. 12 April] – 30 September 1980; born Viktorov) (Note: Russian: Викторов, romanized: Viktorov) was a Soviet and Russian stage and film actor. People's Artist of the USSR (1963).

== Early years ==
He was born Anatoly Petrovich Viktorov on April 24, 1898, in Moscow. His grandfather was a successful merchant, his father, named Pyotr Viktorov, was an industrial engineer. His mother was a pianist and singer.

Young Ktorov was brought up in artistic environment of Moscow's cultural milieu. He attended Classical Gymnasium in Moscow, and was fond of acting in school drama class. In 1916, at age 18, Ktorov became a student at the Acting School of Fyodor Komissarzhevsky, a stern acting coach who was critical of Ktorov's stuttering. But Ktorov, who was a shy person in real life, demonstrated his remarkable persistence and determination; he practiced his lines several hundred times. In 1917, Ktorov made his acting debut on stage of Komissarzhevsky Theatre. Ktorov's stuttering was noticeable only in his real life off-stage, but he never stuttered on-stage. However, director Komissarzhevsky did not believe in Ktorov, and his career seemed to be limited to cameo roles. Ktorov's fate was changed by Illarion Pevtsov who believed in Ktorov's talent and took him as protégé.

In 1919, Pevtsov introduced Ktorov to Vera Popova. She was an established actress and experienced acting coach, she also recognized Ktorov's talent and took him under her wing. Eventually Popova became Ktorov's partner on stage and in life.

== Career in cinema ==
From 1920 to 1933, Ktorov was a permanent member of the troupe at Korsh Theatre in Moscow. There he played leading roles in classic dramas and comedies, as well as in contemporary plays, with Vera Popova as his permanent stage partner.

In 1925, Ktorov shot to fame with the leading role in the silent movie The Tailor from Torzhok (1925) by director Yakov Protazanov. He also gave an impressive performance in Protazanov's St. Jorgen's Day (1930). The highlight of Ktorov's career was his brilliant performance as Paratov in Without a Dowry (1936), a classic film by Yakov Protazanov.

From 1933 to 1980, Ktorov was a permanent member of the troupe at Moscow Art Theatre.

== Later years ==
Anatoly Ktorov was designated People's Artist of the USSR (1963), was awarded the Stalin Prize (1952), and received numerous decorations for his contribution to the art of film and theatre. He gave remarkable performances in his last film roles, which are considered to be his best works, one as Prince Bolkonsky in War and Peace (1967) by director Sergei Bondarchuk, and then as the King in The Ambassador of the Soviet Union (1969).

Anatoly Ktorov died of natural causes on September 30, 1980, in Moscow, and was laid to rest in Vvedenskoye Cemetery in Moscow, Russia.

== Filmography ==
- The Ambassador of the Soviet Union (1969) as King
- War and Peace (1965-1967) as Prince Nikolai Andreyevich Bolkonsky
- Shkola zlosloviya (1952) as Joseph Surface
- Without a Dowry (1936) as Sergei Sergeyevich Paratov
- Marionettes (1934) as "Do" - The Prince
- Zheleznaya brigada (1931)
- St. Jorgen's Day (1930) as Kokris
- Kto ty takoy? (1927)
- Krug (1927)
- The Three Million Trial (1926) as Cascarilla
- Chess Fever (short) (1925) as Tram Passenger
- His Call (1925) as Vladimir Zaglobin
- The Tailor from Torzhok (1925) as young man

== Awards and honors ==
- Honored Artist of the RSFSR (1938)
- Medal "For the Defence of Moscow" (1945)
- Medal "For Valiant Labour in the Great Patriotic War 1941–1945" (1946)
- Medal "In Commemoration of the 800th Anniversary of Moscow" (1948)
- People's Artist of the RSFSR (1948)
- Stalin Prize, 1st class (1952) – for his role as Coco in the play "The Fruits of Enlightenment"
- People's Artist of the USSR (1963)
- Order of Lenin (1967)
- Two Orders of the Red Banner of Labour (1973, 1978)

== See also ==
- Igor Ilyinsky
- Yakov Protazanov
- Ivan Mosjoukine
