= Tale about the Boy-Kibalchish =

Tale about Boy-Kibalchish
- Russian: Сказка о Мальчише-Кибальчише
- Directed by: Yevgeny Sherstobitov
- Written by: Yevgeny Sherstobitov
- Produced by: Aleksey Yarmolski
- Starring: Sergei Ostapenko; Sergei Tikhonov; Anatoly Yurchenko; Sergey Martinson
- Cinematography: Mikhail Belikov
- Music by: Vladimir Rubin; Azon Fattakh
- Release date: 1964
- Running time: 80 minute
- Country: Soviet Union
- Language: Russian

Tale about Boy-Kibalchish (Russian: Сказка о Мальчише-Кибальчише) is a 1964 Soviet children’s war film directed by Yevgeny Sherstobitov and based on a story “A Tale about a War Secret, about the Boy Nipper-Pipper, and His Word of Honour” by Arkady Gaidar.

The film tells about a boy nicknamed Kibalchish, a person of strong moral values, who fights against the corrupt, manipulative, egoistic, impudent rich men.

== Plot ==
The film begins with a dedication to Soviet children and pioneers, setting the stage for a story taking place shortly after the Civil War, when the Red Army had driven out the "cursed bourgeois" forces, ushering in a time of peace. However, the tranquility is disrupted by the arrival of a bourgeois spy, Agent 518, who infiltrates the boys' village. The agent manipulates a greedy and cowardly boy, Malchish-Plohish, promising him rewards if he betrays the community by aiding the bourgeois cause. Despite Agent 518's efforts, the boys refuse to reveal the secret of their strength, a symbol of unity and resilience.

When news arrives that the bourgeois army is attacking, the fathers leave for the front lines, entrusting their children to defend their land. Under the leadership of Malchish-Kibalchish, the boys organize to resist the enemy. Despite sabotage caused by Malchish-Plohish, who accepts bribes of honey and jam to hinder the defense, the boys valiantly stand their ground. They fight courageously against the invading forces, enduring bombardments and hardships while keeping the community's secret safe.

Ultimately, the bourgeois army overpowers the boys after Malchish-Plohish’s betrayal, but the bravery of Malchish-Kibalchish and his comrades becomes a powerful symbol of resistance.

== Cast ==
- Sergei Ostapenko – Boy-Kibalchish
- Sergei Tikhonov – Boy-Plokhish
- Anatoly Yurchenko – Messenger
- Sergey Martinson – Agent 518
- Leonid Gallis – Main Bourgeois
- Dmitry Kapka – Main General
