= Treasure Island (1938 film) =

- Directed by: Vladimir Vaynshtok
- Written by: Robert Louis Stevenson (novel); Oleg Leonidov; Vladimir Vaynshtok
- Based on: Treasure Island; 1883 novel by Robert Louis Stevenson
- Starring: Osip Abdulov; Mikhail Klimov; Nikolai Cherkasov
- Cinematography: Mikhail Kirillov
- Edited by: M. Shitova
- Music by: Nikita Bogoslovsky
- Production company: Gorky Film Studio
- Release date: 5 January 1938
- Running time: 92 minutes
- Country: Soviet Union
- Language: Russian

Treasure Island (Russian: Остров сокровищ, romanized: Ostrov sokrovishch) is a 1938 Soviet adventure film directed by Vladimir Vaynshtok and starring Osip Abdulov, Mikhail Klimov and Nikolai Cherkasov. It is an adaptation of Robert Louis Stevenson's novel Treasure Island. The film was one of several British literary classics turned into films in the Soviet Union during the era. A number of changes were made to introduce anti-British elements and to promote leninist-marxist ideology. The book's character of Jim Hawkins is transformed into a young woman named Jenny, and the characters are attempting to find the treasure in order to fund an Irish and anti-British rebellion. An English language version was directed by David Bradley.

== Plot summary ==
Set at the end of the 18th century, the story reinterprets the events of Treasure Island, diverging significantly from the original novel. Irish rebels in need of funds to purchase weapons discover a map of Treasure Island among the belongings of pirate Billy Bones, who was killed by another pirate. Jenny, the daughter of an innkeeper, and Dr. Livesey, one of the rebellion leaders, join forces with Captain Smollett and financier Trelawney to outfit a ship, the Hispaniola. Unbeknownst to them, many crew members are pirates. Disguised as a boy, Jenny signs on as a cabin boy under the name Jim to accompany the voyage.

As the search for treasure unfolds, Trelawney betrays the group by siding with the pirates. After numerous perilous adventures, Dr. Livesey, Jenny (who reveals her true identity), and their allies find the treasure. However, Jenny is captured by the pirates and held aboard the Hispaniola under the watch of Israel Hands and George Merry. The pirates fight among themselves, with Hands killing Merry and attacking Jenny. Dr. Livesey saves her by shooting Hands.

The heroes capture the ship's boatswain, Long John Silver, but he resists and is killed in a duel with Captain Smollett. The rebels abandon the remaining pirates on the deserted island and return to Ireland with the treasure to secure weapons and continue their uprising.

== Cast ==
- Klavdiya Pugachova as Jenny Hawkins
- Osip Abdulov as John Silver
- Mikhail Klimov as Trelawney
- Nikolai Cherkasov as Billy Bones
- Aleksandr Bykov as Captain Smollett
- Iona Bij-Brodsky as George Mari
- Pyotr Galadzhev as Ben Gunn
- Aleksandr Levshin
- Nikolai Michurin
- Mikhail Tsaryov as Dr. Livesey
- Vladimir Yershov
- L. Meshcherin
- V. Yakushenko

== Bibliography ==
- Evgeny Dobrenko & Marina Balina. The Cambridge Companion to Twentieth-Century Russian Literature. Cambridge University Press, 2011.
