= The Tailor from Torzhok =

1925 film by Yakov Protazanov

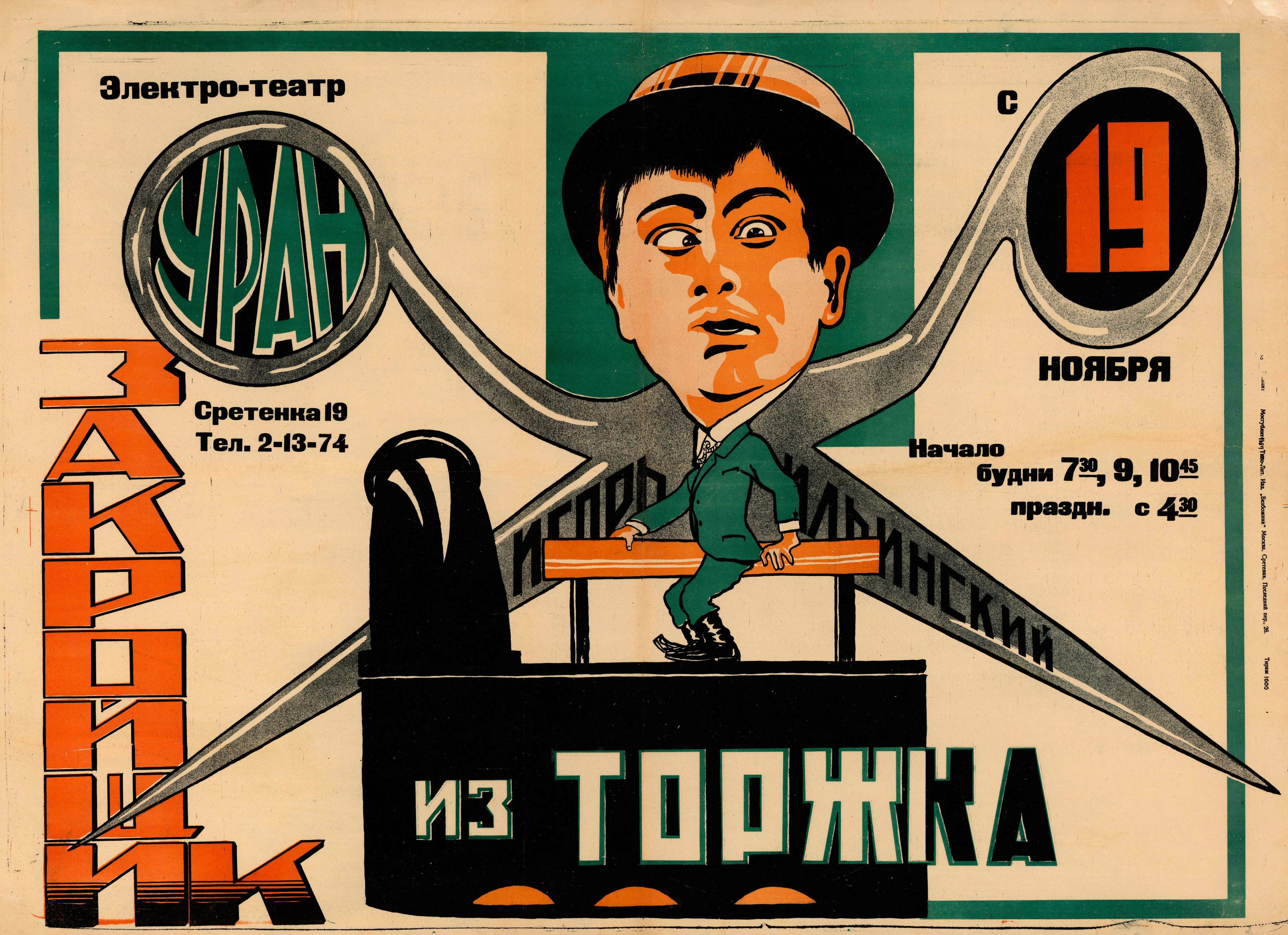
- Original film poster
- Directed by: Yakov Protazanov
- Written by: Valentin Turkin
- Starring: Igor Ilyinsky
- Cinematography: Pyotr Yermolov
- Production company: Mezhrabpom-Russ
- Release date: 1925
- Running time: 65 minutes
- Country: Soviet Union
- Language: Silent film (Russian intertitles)

The Tailor from Torzhok

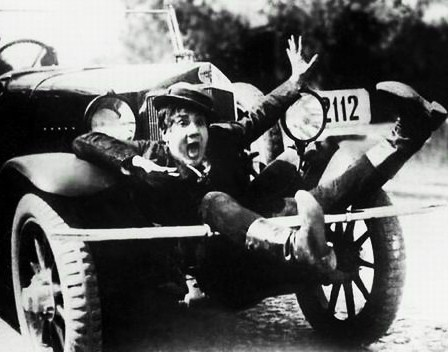
A scene from the film

The Tailor from Torzhok (Russian: Закройщик из Торжка, romanized: Zakroyshchik iz Torzhka) is a 1925 Soviet silent comedy film directed by Yakov Protazanov and starring Igor Ilyinsky. The picture was commissioned as publicity for the State Lottery Loan.

== Plot ==
The film takes place in Soviet Russia during the NEP in a small provincial town. Petya Petelkin is a humble tailor of a sewing workshop belonging to the widow Shirinkina. The widow decides to marry her employee and Petya buys a lottery ticket hoping to win so that he can present her with a fancy gift.

He wins the big prize, starts dreaming of having his own shop, but the winning ticket disappears and passes from hand to hand. This is the beginning of a series of comic adventures. Petya is on the verge of committing suicide, but eventually everything ends well.

== Cast ==
- Igor Ilyinsky as Petya Petelkin
- Olga Zhizneva as Young Lady
- Anatoly Ktorov as Young Man
- Vera Maretskaya as Katya
- Lidiya Deykun as Widow Shirinkina
- Iosif Tolchanov
- Serafima Birman as Neighbor
- Eva Milyutina
- Vladimir Uralsky as Labour Union official

== See also ==
- The Three Million Trial
- A Kiss from Mary Pickford
- Miss Mend

== Bibliography ==
- Leyda, Jay (1960), Kino: A History of the Russian and Soviet Film, New York: Macmillan, OCLC 1683826.
- Aleinikov, Moisei, ed. (1957), Yakov Protazanov: O tvorcheskom puti rezhissera (in Russian), Moscow: Iskusstvo, OCLC 13571289.
