= His Call =

1925 film

- Directed by: Yakov Protazanov
- Written by: Vera Eri
- Starring: Varvara Popova
- Cinematography: Louis Forestier
- Production company: Mezhrabpom-Russ
- Release date: 17 February 1925
- Running time: 62 minutes (1700 meters)
- Country: Soviet Union
- Language: Silent film (Russian intertitles)

His Call (Russian: Его призыв, romanized: Yego prizyv) is a 1925 Soviet silent drama film directed by Yakov Protazanov. It was also released as 23 January (Russian: 23 января) in the Soviet Union and as Broken Chains in the United States.

== Plot ==
The main protagonists of the film are Katya, the daughter of a factory worker, and Andrey, the son of the former owner of the factory who illegally returns to the USSR to find treasures hidden by his father. The film title refers to the Communist Party's appeal, after Lenin's death, to enlarge its membership.

== Cast ==
- Varvara Popova as Katya Sushkova
- Maria Blumenthal-Tamarina as Katya's grandmother
- Ivan Koval-Samborsky as Andrey
- Olga Zhizneva as Lulu
- Anatoly Ktorov as Vladimir Zaglobin
- Vera Maretskaya as Varya
- Mikhail Zharov as Worker
- Tatyana Mukhina as Girl
