= Valentina Tokarskaya =

Russian actress

- Валентина Токарская
- Born: Valentina Georgievna Tokarskaya; February 3, 1906; Odessa, Russian Empire (now Ukraine)
- Died: September 30, 1996 (aged 90); Moscow, USSR
- Occupation: Actress

Valentina Georgievna Tokarskaya (Russian: Валентина Георгиевна Токарская; 3 February 1906 – 30 September 1996) was a Russian film and stage actress.

== Selected filmography ==
- Malenkie komedii bolshogo doma (TV movie) (1975) Kira Platonovna
- Dro itsureba gantiadisas (1965)
- Ispytatelnyy srok (1960) The croupier
- Delo N. 306 (1957) Karasyova
- Marionetki (1934) "Mi" - The Singing Star
