= Mikhail Klimov =

Russian actor

- Михаил Климов
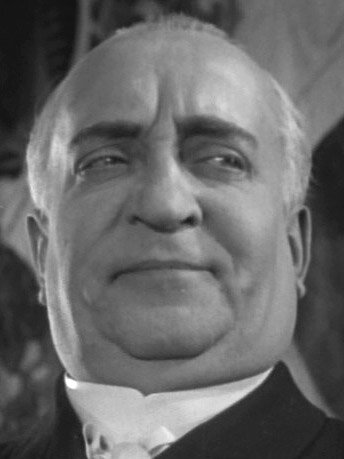
- Klimov in 1933
- Born: November 20, 1880; Saint Petersburg, Russian Empire
- Died: July 9, 1942 (aged 61); Tbilisi, Georgian SSR, Soviet Union
- Occupation: Actor
- Years active: 1903–1942

Mikhail Mikhailovich Klimov (Russian: Михаил Михайлович Климов; November 20, 1880 – July 9, 1942) was a Soviet and Russian stage and film actor. People's Artist of the USSR (1937).

From 1909 to 1940, he was a leading actor of the Maly theatre. During the 1920s and 1930s, he was also a popular film actor, he usually played roles of the main hero's antagonists.

He died in Tbilisi in 1942, and was buried and was buried in the Staro-Veriyskoye Cemetery.

== Filmography ==
Year	Title	Role	Notes
1926	The Three Million Trial	Banker Ornano	
1927	Man from the Restaurant	Shtoss the manager	
1929	The Lame Gentleman	Volkov	
1930	St. Jorgen's Day	Vicar	
1934	Marionettes	A, The Prime Minister	
1937	Without a Dowry	Mokiy Parmyonych Knurov	
1938	Treasure Island	Squire Trelawney	
1942	Giorgi Saakadze	Prince Andukapar	Voice, role played by Shalva Gambashidze

== Awards and honors ==
- Honored Artist of the RSFSR (1928)
- People's Artist of the RSFSR (1933)
- People's Artist of the USSR (1937)
- Order of the Red Banner of Labour (1937)
