= Without a Dowry (film) =

- Directed by: Yakov Protazanov
- Written by: Yakov Protazanov; Vladimir Shveitser
- Starring: Nina Alisova; Anatoly Ktorov; Mikhail Klimov
- Production company: Mezhrabpomfilm
- Release date: 26 January 1937
- Running time: 81 minutes
- Country: Soviet Union
- Language: Russian

Without a Dowry (Russian: Бесприданница, romanized: Bespridannitsa) is a 1937 Soviet drama film directed by Yakov Protazanov and starring Nina Alisova. It was based on Alexander Ostrovsky's play Without a Dowry (1878).

== Plot ==
Larisa Ogudalova is of marriageable age, but while she has many suitors, they all demand a dowry she does not possess. Among her admirers, the unremarkable Yuli Karandyshev is the only one to propose marriage, and Larisa reluctantly agrees. As preparations for the wedding commence, the dashing nobleman Sergey Paratov, whom Larisa once loved, arrives in town. Old feelings are reignited, and Larisa impulsively runs away with Paratov for an outing across the Volga River.

During their picnic, Larisa and Paratov have a decisive conversation in which he confesses that he is already engaged. This revelation shatters Larisa, and upon their return, she confronts Karandyshev. In a heated exchange, Karandyshev asserts his claim over her, but Larisa finds him pitiable and insignificant.

Overwhelmed by humiliation and jealousy, Karandyshev fatally shoots Larisa, declaring, "If I can't have you, no one will!" For Larisa, disillusioned by the harsh realities of life, death becomes a tragic release.

== Cast ==
- Nina Alisova – Larisa Dmitriyevna Ogudalova
- Olga Pyzhova – Kharita Ignatyevna Ogudalova
- Anatoly Ktorov – Sergei Sergeyevich Paratov
- Mikhail Klimov – Mokiy Parmyonych Knurov
- Boris Tenin – Vasily Danilych Vozhevatov
- Vladimir Balikhin – Yuly Kapitonych Karandyshev
- Vladimir Popov – Arkady "Robinzon" Shablitsev
- Varvara Ryzhova – Yefrosinya Potapovna
