= Nasreddin in Bukhara =

- Directed by: Yakov Protazanov
- Written by: Viktor Vitkovich; Leonid Solovyov (novel)
- Starring: Lev Sverdlin
- Cinematography: Daniil Demutsky
- Music by: Boris Arapov; Mukhtar Ashrafi
- Production company: Uzbekfilm
- Release date: 2 August 1943
- Running time: 86 minutes
- Country: Soviet Union
- Language: Russian

Nasreddin in Bukhara (Russian: Насреддин в Бухаре, romanized: Nasreddin v Bukhare) is a 1943 Soviet comedy film directed by Yakov Protazanov, based on the novel by Leonid Solovyov Disturber of the Peace about Nasreddin.

== Plot ==
Nasreddin arrives in the city of Bukhara with his donkey after many adventures around half the world. The city is bustling as a bazaar is taking place and the Emir is scheduled to hold court.

At the city gate, Nasreddin's ingenuity is immediately tested as he must find a way to enter without paying the numerous taxes. After succeeding, he discovers a young, pretty girl named Gyuldjan at a pond, drawing water with a jug. He falls in love with her at once and calls her "little toad". In return, she compares him to a donkey. Suddenly, there is a commotion at the pond because a man is about to drown. After several failed rescue attempts, Nasreddin shows the correct way to save him. Recognizing the man as wealthy, Nasreddin holds a coin towards the drowning man, who reaches for it and thus gets closer to the shore until he is safe. The rescued man is Jafar, a usurer who had recently threatened the potter Niyaz to take him to court if he didn't repay a loan of 100 tangas plus 300% interest and 10 tanga costs immediately.

Jafar does indeed take the potter to court, where Niyaz pleads with the Emir for a delay in repaying his debt. However, he is granted only one hour. If Niyaz cannot come up with the money in that time, he and his family will be forced to serve the creditor as slaves. Nasreddin, observing this, comforts the potter and promises to obtain the required 410 tangas. With a humorous story about his donkey's cleverness, Nasreddin wins over the people in a tavern. When he reveals he is the world-renowned trickster Nasreddin, they decide to help him gather the 410 tangas. Although none of them have money, each gives items they can spare, even if they are old or broken. Nasreddin finds a buyer who, after lengthy negotiations, pays the entire amount; it is the usurer Jafar. Jafar tells him that he has long desired the prettiest girl in Bukhara and plans to marry her at noon. Just before the deadline, Nasreddin pays Jafar the demanded amount for Niyaz. When Niyaz's daughter Gyuldjan also thanks him, Nasreddin realizes she is the "little toad", which delights him. Jafar seeks revenge and tells the Emir about the beautiful girl, suggesting she would fit well among his wives. The Emir orders his servants to bring Gyuldjan to the palace, intending to visit her in the harem that night. The abduction is successful, and Gyuldjan, prepared for the night with the Emir, falls ill immediately.

The Emir is furious that Nasreddin is still at large, even though the Turkish sultan from Istanbul informed long ago that he had Nasreddin beheaded and the Shah of Tehran claimed that he had cut him into pieces. The Emir deploys spies throughout the city to locate Nasreddin and offers a reward of 3,000 tangas. However, finding him is not easy, as Nasreddin disguises himself in women's clothing, with his face covered. When the Emir learns that Nasreddin is on the bazaar in women's attire, he orders all women checked, provoking the anger of the Muslim men present. This leads to a wild brawl, allowing Nasreddin to disappear unnoticed.

Amidst the chaos, the healer and astrologer Hussein-Husliya arrives in Bukhara from Baghdad, seeking the Emir's palace. Nasreddin sees his chance to enter the Emir's palace to rescue Gyuldjan. With a trick, he convinces the scholar to swap clothes with him, explaining that the Emir plans to behead him. In his new identity, Nasreddin gains the Emir's trust. He even takes over the interrogation of the real Hussein-Husliya, who has been captured. He is also asked to heal the sick girl in the harem, which he may enter only in the Emir's company. Now knowing the way, he sets out to free Gyuldjan. Distracting the guard at the harem, he rescues the "little toad" and diverts the palace guards. He reveals himself as Nasreddin, whose capture reward the Emir has raised to 10,000 tangas. The guards, eager for the reward, chase him, allowing Gyuldjan to leave the palace unhindered. Nasreddin escapes, reverts to his scholar disguise, and returns to the Emir for safety.

As the Emir is about to execute the potter Niyaz in the marketplace, Nasreddin, still disguised as Hussein-Husliya, intervenes. He persuades the Emir to free all accused if he reveals Nasreddin's whereabouts, but his protector must be executed, which the Emir agrees to. Nasreddin then reveals himself, is arrested, and the prisoners are freed, as the Emir himself is Nasreddin's protector. Nasreddin is sentenced to death by drowning, tied in a sack, and taken to the pond. On the way, he exploits the greed of his carriers, who leave him alone in the sack for a while. He convinces the passing usurer Jafar that he is voluntarily in the sack because it cures all ailments, and they swap places. When the carriers realize they've been tricked, they beat the man in the sack and carry him to the pond, where they throw him in, causing Jafar to drown miserably. At the pond, Nasreddin reveals himself to the mourning crowd, leading to great jubilation. He asks for silence so he and Gyuldjan can leave the city forever, undisturbed.

== Cast ==
- Lev Sverdlin - Nasreddin
- M. Mirzakarimova - Gyuldjan
- Konstantin Mikhailov - The Emir
- Emmanuil Geller - Djafar
- Vasili Zaychikov - Niyaz, Gyuldjan's father
- Stepan Kayukov - Bakhtiyar, the wazir
- Matvei Lyarov - Arslanbek
- Nikolai Volkov - Hussein-Husliya
- A. Talitov - Yusup
- Asad Ismatov - Ali
- Ivan Bobrov
- M. Mirakilov
- A. Pirmukhamedov
