= Departure of a Grand Old Man =

Departure of a Grand Old Man (Уход великого старца)
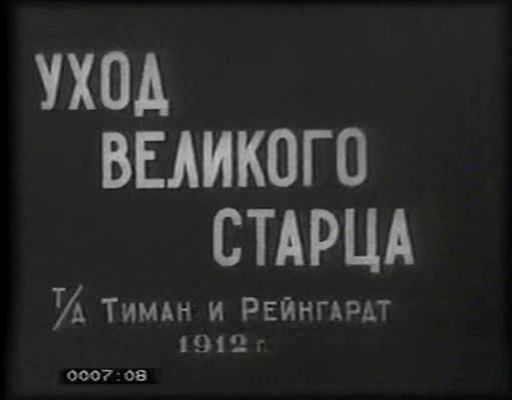
- Directed by: Yakov Protazanov; Elizaveta Thiman
- Written by: Isaak Teneromo
- Produced by: Pavell Thiman
- Starring: Olga Petrova; Vladimir Shaternikov; Mikhail Tamarov; Elizaveta Thiman
- Cinematography: Aleksandr Levitsky; Georges Meyer
- Production company: P. Thiman and F. Reinhardt
- Release date: 1912
- Running time: 31 minutes
- Country: Russian Empire
- Languages: Silent film Russian intertitles

Departure of a Grand Old Man (Russian: «Уход великого старца», romanized: Ukhod velikovo startza) is a 1912 Russian silent film about the last days of author Leo Tolstoy. The film was directed by Yakov Protazanov and Elizaveta Thiman, and was actress Olga Petrova's first film.

== Plot ==
Departure of a Grand Old Man (1912)

The film depicts a group of peasants who come to the home of Leo Tolstoy to ask for land. We see the old sage attempting to help the peasants while his wife Sofia Andreevna is counting money and quarreling.

Overwhelmed, Tolstoy is driven to the edge of suicide. It ends with Tolstoy on his death bed being visited by Jesus. The film was banned because of the negative portrayal of Tolstoy's wife Sofia Tolstaya, who threatened to sue the filmmakers for libel.

== Cast ==
- Olga Petrova as Sofia Tolstaya
- Vladimir Shaternikov as Leo Tolstoy
- Leo Tolstoy as himself (from documentary footage filmed by Alexander Drankov)
- Mikhail Tamarov as Vladimir Chertkov
- Elizaveta Thiman as Alexandra Lvovna Tolstaya

== Citations ==
- Kenez, Peter, Cinema and Soviet Society: 1917-1953 (Cambridge: Cambridge University Press, 1992)
