= Igor Ilyinsky =

Soviet actor and director (1901–1987)

- Игорь Ильинский
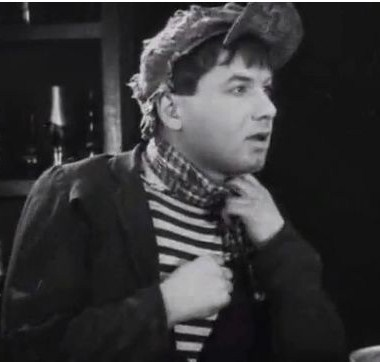
- Ilyinsky in The Three Million Trial (1926)
- Born: 24 July 1901 [O.S. 11 July] Moscow, Russian Empire
- Died: 13 January 1987 (aged 85); Moscow, Russian SFSR, Soviet Union
- Resting place: Novodevichy Cemetery
- Spouse(s): Tatiana Ilyinskaya (m. 1920–1945) Tatyana Yeremeeva (m. 1951)

Comedy career
- Genres: Slapstick, mime
- Igor Ilyinsky's voice Recorded in 1952

Igor Vladimirovich Ilyinsky (Note: Russian: Игорь Владимирович Ильинский, romanized: Igor Vladimirovich Ilyinsky) (24 July 1901 [O.S. 11 July] – 13 January 1987) was a Soviet and Russian stage and film actor, director and comedian. He was a Hero of Socialist Labour (1974) and a People's Artist of the USSR (1949).

== Early years ==
Igor Ilyinsky was born on 24 July 1901 in Moscow. At age 16 he entered the Theatre Studio of Theodore Komisarjevsky and in half a year debuted on the professional stage at Komissarzhevskaya Theatre. His first theatre role was that of the "Old Man" in Aristophanes' play Lysistrata. In 1920, he joined the Vsevolod Meyerhold State Theatre. The young actor's style was in correspondence with the principles of Meyerhold, and so Ilyinsky soon became the central actor of that theatre. He worked with Meyerhold on several of his most famous productions: Mistery-Buffo (1921), The Forest (1924), The Magnanimous Cuckold (1926), Woe to Wit (1928), The Bedbug (1929). Alongside Erast Garin, he was the most prominent actor in the Meyerhold Theater and this is where he learned the acting technique called Biomechanics.

== Career in silent cinema ==
In the mid-1920s Ilyinsky started to appear in movies, where he also played vivid comic characters. In 1924, Yakov Protazanov featured him in his futuristic film Aelita, which was followed by his role in Protazanov's comedy The Tailor from Torzhok (1925). In 1926, he appeared in three films.

“I can act on the roof of a train carriage, on the radiator of a moving car, on back of a galloping horse, or while swimming in the sea”.

== 1930s–1950s ==
In 1938 he joined the Maly Theatre that had been his favourite one since school years. Afterwards Ilyinsky stayed in the Maly Theatre for almost fifty years and even staged several plays there himself. Ilyinsky would later write that it was Russian classic literature that had helped him overcome the crisis and feeling that he had been unable to create new characters, different from the previous ones. An outstandingly prolific period in the actor's life was related to his work with the film director Grigori Aleksandrov. In 1938 Ilyinsky splendidly acted as Byvalov in the comedy Volga-Volga (for this role, he was awarded the Stalin Prize in 1941). He deliberately avoided any comic traits in his character to create a common image of a red-tapist.

The starting point for him was the gracious and stirring character of Lyubov Orlova. He decided to create a totally contrasting character, which he succeeded in. That role brought Ilyinsky the State Prize. Stalin reportedly watched the film sixteen times. At Vyacheslav Molotov's birthday party, Stalin flung Ilyinsky a remark: “Ah, Byvalov! You are a bureaucrat and I am a bureaucrat. We shall understand each other”. The success of that movie determined the development of Soviet film comedy for the next several decades. However, after the film Ilyinsky almost stopped his film acting. In the mid-1950s Ilyinsky finally got a chance to act in a movie. It was a light comedy, A Crazy Day. The character created by Ilyinsky was a repetition of what he had done 20 years earlier. He managed to play a truly starry film role only 18 years after Volga-Volga. It was the role of the bureaucrat Ogurtsov in the smash-hit comedy Carnival Night, directed by Eldar Ryazanov.

“I was not going to feature the great Igor Ilyinsky in Carnival Night - I felt timid, and understood that being a coryphaeus he would suppress me. When Pyryev offered him for the role of Ogurtsov, I just panicked: he was my idol from childhood, the famous actor of the Meyerhold Theatre! And me, directing my first film, on the other scale!” (Eldar Ryazanov)

== Later years ==
In the Maly Theatre at the same time Ilyinsky shifted to portrayals of deeply tragic characters, in particular, from Fyodor Dostoyevsky and Leo Tolstoy. In the late 1960s Ilyinsky went into stage directing. His first stage production was the stage version of Gustave Flaubert's popular novel Madame Bovary. The last period of Ilyinsky's career was marked by his portrayal of Leo Tolstoy in the play Turning Full Circle and of Firs, and his performance in The Cherry Orchard by Anton Chekhov. As a very old person, Igor Ilyinsky acted a lot on the radio – almost blind, he was accompanied to the studio.

== Personal life ==
His first marriage was to actress Tatyana Ivanovna Ilyinskaya, who died of typhus during the Great Patriotic War. Igor Ilyinsky took her death very hard, and according to his son, he almost committed suicide.

His second wife was the Maly Theater actress Tatyana Yeremeyeva (real name - Bitrich; 1913–2012). They had a son, Vladimir Ilyinsky.

== Death ==
Igor Ilyinsky died on 13 January 1987, aged 85. His widow, actress Tatyana Yeremeeva, died on 29 November 2012, aged 99.

== Legacy ==
- A minor planet 3622 Ilinsky, discovered by Soviet astronomer Lyudmila Zhuravleva in 1981 is named after Igor Ilyinsky.

== Filmography ==
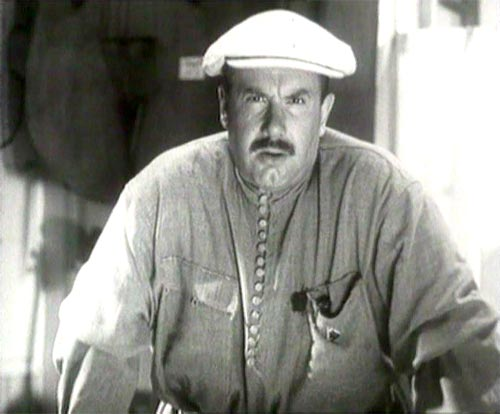
Igor Ilyinsky as Byvalov in the film Volga-Volga (1938).

- 1924: Aelita as Kravtsov, amateur sleuth
- 1924: Papirosnitsa ot Mosselproma as Nikodim Mityushin, bookkeeper
- 1925: The Tailor from Torzhok as Petya Petelkin
- 1926: The Three Million Trial as Tapioka
- 1926: Miss Mend as Tom Hopkins, clerk
- 1927: A Kiss From Mary Pickford as Goga
- 1928: The Doll with Millions as Pierre Cuisinai
- 1930: St. Jorgen's Day as Franz Schulz
- 1931: Shakhta 12-28 as The Angel
- 1936: Once in the Summer as Teleskop / professor Sen-Verbuda
- 1938: Volga-Volga as Byvalov
- 1952: Enough Stupidity in Every Wise Man as Krutitsky
- 1952: Woe from Wit as Anton Antonovich Zagoretski
- 1952: Wolves and Sheep as Appolon Murzavetsky
- 1956: Crazy Day (Безумный день) as Zajtsev
- 1956: Carnival Night as Serafim Ivanovich Ogurtsov
- 1962: Hussar Ballad as Mikhail Kutuzov
- 1962: Dinner Time (short) as Pyotr Petrovich
- 1969: An Old Acquaintance (film) as Ogurtsov
- 1974: Sea Cadet of Northern Fleet as man from the queue
- 1976: This Is the House That Jack Built (short) as narrator (voice)

== Honours and awards ==
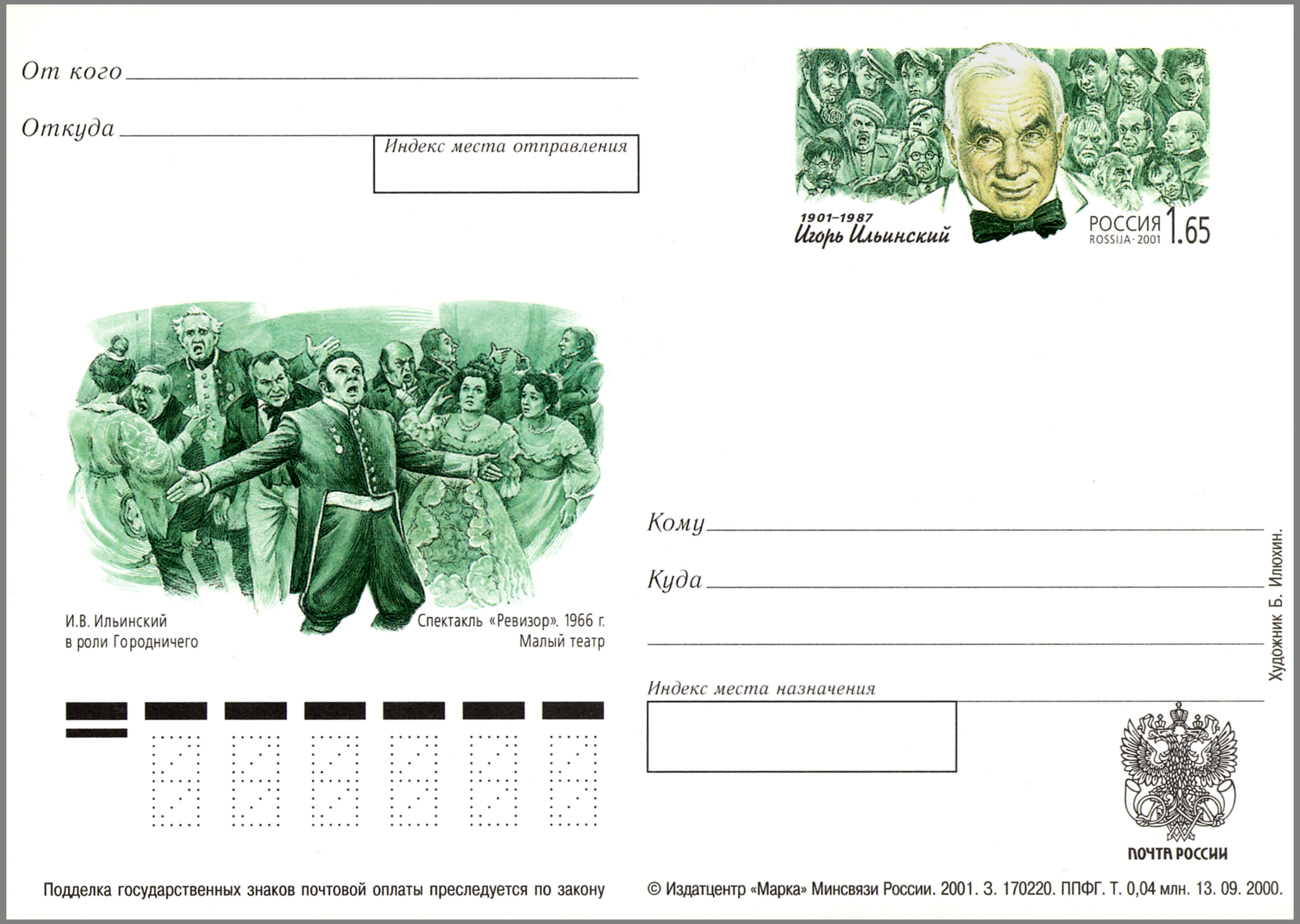
Igor Ilyinsky as the Governor in The Government Inspector (Maly Theatre, 1952). The postal card issued to commemorate the birth centenary of the actor. Russian Post, 2001.

- Hero of Socialist Labour (1974)
- Honored Artist of the RSFSR (1942)
- People's Artist of the RSFSR (1945)
- People's Artist of the USSR (1949)
- Three Orders of Lenin (1967, 1971, 1974)
- Order of the October Revolution (1986)
- Order of the Red Banner of Labour, three times (1939, 1949 and 1961)
- Order of Friendship of Peoples (1981)
- Lenin Prize (1980)
- Three Stalin Prizes first degree:
  - for his role as Byvalov in the 1938 film Volga-Volga (1941)
  - for his role of garlic in the play "In the steppes of Ukraine" by Oleksandr Korniychuk (1942)
  - for his role in the play "Unforgettable 1919" by Vsevolod Vishnevsky (1951)

== See also ==
- Vsevolod Meyerhold
- Vsevolod Meyerhold State Theatre
- Yakov Protazanov
- Pyotr Chardynin
