= Marionettes (film) =

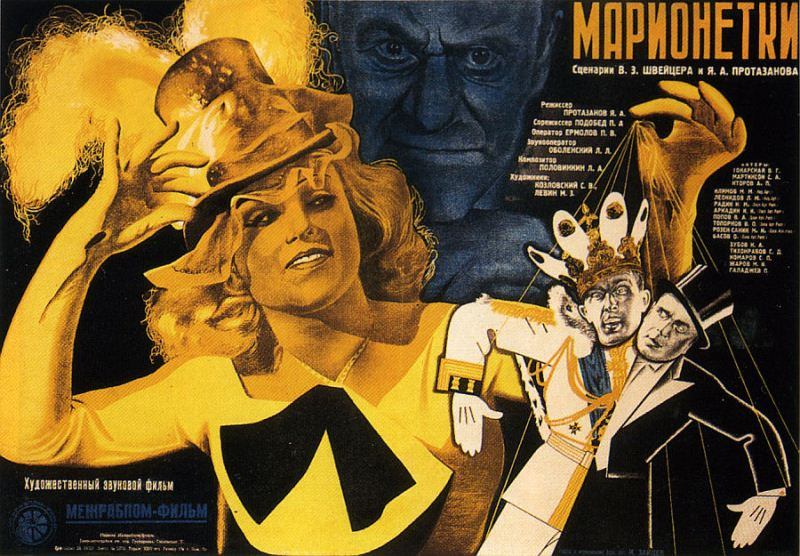
- Theater Poster in the USSR
- Directed by: Yakov Protazanov; Porfiri Podobed
- Written by: Vladimir Shveitser; Yakov Protazanov
- Starring: Anatoly Ktorov; Nikolai Radin; Valentina Tokarskaya
- Music by: Leonid Polovinkin
- Production company: Mezhrabpomfilm
- Release date: 3 February 1934
- Running time: 97 minutes
- Country: Soviet Union
- Language: Russian

Marionettes (Russian: Марионетки) is a 1934 Soviet satirical antifascist film directed by Yakov Protazanov and Porfiri Podobed.

The film is a hybrid of several genres: musical comedy, social satire and political propaganda.

== Plot ==
The film begins with a prologue in which a master of ceremonies (Ivan Arkadin) introduces the principal cast - all of whom are named after the seven notes of the musical scale (Do, Re, Mi, Fa, So, La, and Ti) - in the form of marionettes on a puppet stage.

The scene then transitions to the fictional European constitutional monarchy of Boufferia, which is racked by economic chaos and political unrest. The nation's major political factions - monarchists, liberals, fascists, and socialists - squabble fruitlessly in parliament, while the common people grow increasingly radicalized by the example of the USSR, with which Boufferia shares a heavily militarized border. The king is unable to exert a stabilizing influence, being only a boy of seven, so the country's secret rulers - a cabal of wealthy capitalists - decide to replace him with a more mature and capable figure. They conclude that most suitable candidate is the prince Do (Anatoly Ktorov), a dissipated playboy living abroad and mired in debt.

The prince accepts the throne, but on the way to Boufferia, he has too much to drink, leans too far out an airplane window, and falls out, unnoticed by the other passengers and aircrew. When the plane lands, the cheering crowd mistakes Do's valet and barber So (Sergey Martinson) for the prince, and - despite his inarticulate protests - he is acclaimed as the new sovereign and carried off to the palace.

Meanwhile, prince Do miraculously survives his fall from the airplane into a river, and manages to make it to shore. However, he finds himself in the vicinity of the Soviet-Boufferian border, and is promptly arrested by an overzealous detachment of frontier guards, who mistake him for a Bolshevik infiltrator.

The frightened So is arrayed in royal regalia and crowned. At first mute with terror, he is pressed on policy questions by parliamentary delegations, and in a panic blurts out non-sequiturs relating to his area of expertise, personal grooming. His answers are willfully misinterpreted in the spirit of whatever the inquiring parties wish to hear, and the "prince" is acclaimed as a font of Solomonic wisdom. In particular, when asked about measures to resolve the state crisis, So suggests "hot compresses and lead lotions," delighting the leader of the fascist faction, Fa (Konstantin Zubov), who construes the answer as a gnomic endorsement of political violence.

Gradually, So comes to feel more and more confident in his assumed role and begins to make more assertive statements, earning the support of a reactionary coalition consisting of the fascists, the archbishop Re and the cabal of capitalists that had recalled him from exile. Meanwhile, prince Do manages to extricate himself from the border post and make it to the capital and the palace, where no one recognizes him. He assumes the position of barber-valet to king So; the latter immediately recognizes him, but his initial terror is quickly replaced with confidence once he realizes that his position is unassailable. Prince Do's glamorous fiancée, the singer and actress Mi (Valentina Tokarskaya) arrives from abroad and is shocked to find So in the royal apartments, haughtily ordering around Do, who awkwardly tries to preserve his dignity in front of Mi. The cabal schemes to touch off a Boufferian-Soviet war by having a border artillery battery launch an unprovoked surprise attack against the USSR; simultaneously, prince Do finally loses his temper and assaults So for his insolence, chasing him around the palace. At the exact moment the cannon at the border fortress fires, the irate real prince beans the impostor over the head with a heavy volume entitled "The Philosophy Of Fascism," presented to him earlier by an intellectual sycophant.

At this point, the film transitions to the same tableau being enacted by marionettes, which freeze in position. The master of ceremonies appears again and assures the viewers that all they have seen is just a petty display of absurdity, and the marionettes fall lifeless as the unseen puppeteer above lets go of the strings.

== Cast ==
- Anatoly Ktorov – C, the Prince
- Nikolai Radin – D, the Archbishop
- Valentina Tokarskaya – E, The Singing Star, the Prince's Fiancée
- Konstantin Zubov – F, the Fascist
- Sergey Martinson – G, the Barber
- Mikhail Klimov – A, The Prime Minister
- Vladimir Popov – White General
- Leonid Leonidov – The Munitions Manufacturer
- Ivan Arkadin – Master of Ceremonies
- Vasily Toporkov – Director of the Marionette Theater
- Pyotr Galadzhev – Scribe
- Mikhail Zharov – Head of Frontier Post
