= People's Artist of the RSFSR =

Soviet title of honor

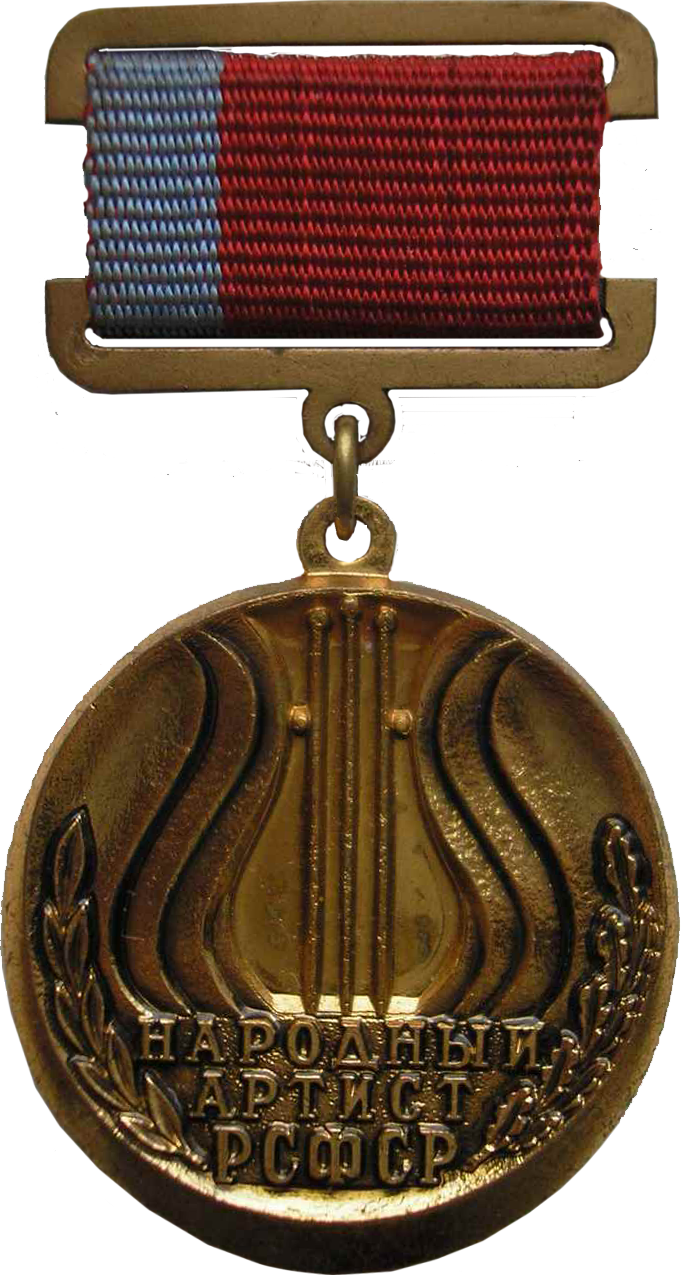

People's Artist of the RSFSR (Russian: Народный артист РСФСР, Narodnyj artist RSFSR) was an honorary title granted to Soviet Union artists, including theatre and film directors, actors, choreographers, music performers, and orchestra conductors, who had outstanding achievements in the arts, and who lived in the Russian Soviet Federative Socialist Republic (RSFSR). This title was one rank below Honored Artist of the RSFSR and one above People's Artist of the USSR.

The title was introduced on 10 August 1931. In 1992, after the Russian SFSR was renamed as the Russian Federation, it was replaced by People's Artist of Russia.

== List ==
=== The year of assignment is not set ===
- Alexander Kramov (1885–1951), actor, theater director
- Tamara Makarova (1907–1997), film actress
- Vera Michurina-Samoilova (1866–1948), theater actress
- Nikolay Svetlovidov (1889–1970), theater and film actor
- Yevdokiya Turchaninova (1870–1963), theater actress
- Alexandra Yablochkina (1866–1964), theater actress

=== 1918 ===
- Feodor Chaliapin (1873–1938), opera singer (bass)

=== 1920s ===
1920

- Maria Ermolova (1853–1928), dramatic actress

1922

- Alexander Glazunov (1865–1936), composer
- Vladimir Davydov (1849–1925), dramatic actor, theater director
- Mikhail Ippolitov-Ivanov (1859–1935), composer, conductor and musical figure
- Alexander Sumbatov (Yuzhin) (1857–1927), actor, playwright, theater worker

1923

- Vladimir Nemirovich-Danchenko (1858–1943), theater director. People's Artist of the USSR (1936).
- Vsevolod Meyerhold (1874–1940), director
- Leonid Sobinov (1872–1924), opera singer (lyric-dramatic tenor)
- Konstantin Stanislavsky (1863–1938), theater director. People's Artist of the USSR (1936).

1924

- Elena Leshkovskaya (1864–1925), dramatic actress
- Glikeriya Fedotova (1846–1925), actress

1925

- Yekaterina Geltzer (1876–1962), ballerina
- Antonina Nezhdanova (1873–1950), opera singer. People's Artist of the USSR (1936).
- Václav Suk (1861–1933), conductor
- Ivan Ershov (1867–1943), opera singer. People's Artist of the USSR (1938).

1926

- Pavel Olenev (1869–1932), theater actor
- Ivan Moskvin (1874–1946), actor. People's Artist of the USSR (1936).

1927

- Yuri Yuryev (1872–1948), actor. People's Artist of the USSR (1939).

1928

- Maria Blumenthal-Tamarina (1859–1938), film and theater actress. People's Artist of the USSR (1936).
- Alexander Golovin (1863–1930), theater artist, painter
- Vasily Kachalov (1875–1948), theater actor. People's Artist of the USSR (1936).
- Olga Knipper-Chekhov (1868–1959), actress. People's Artist of the USSR (1937).
- Leonid Leonidov (1873–1941), actor and director of theater and cinema. People's Artist of the USSR (1936).

1929

- Stepan Kuznetsov (1879–1932), theater actor

=== 1930s ===
1931

- Robert Adelheim (1860–1934), theater actor
- Raphael Adelheim (1861–1938), theater actor
- Aleksandr Goldenweiser (1875–1961), pianist, composer. People's Artist of the USSR (1946).

1932

- Ulirh Avranek (1853–1937), opera choirmaster, conductor, cellist
- Nikolai Monakhov (1875–1936), actor
- Illarion Pevtsov (1879–1934), theater and film actor

1933

- Ksenia Derzhinskaya (1889–1951), opera singer. People's Artist of the USSR (1937).
- Mikhail Klimov (1880–1942), actor. People's Artist of the USSR (1937).
- Maria Lilina (1866–1943), actress
- Yevsey Lyubimov-Lanskoy (1883–1943), actor, theater director
- Varvara Massalitinova (1878–1945), actress
- Nadezhda Obukhova (1886–1961), opera singer. People's Artist of the USSR (1937).
- Vasily Petrov (1875–1937), opera singer (bass)
- Varvara Ryzhova (1871–1963), actress. People's Artist of the USSR (1937).
- Prov Sadovsky (Jr.) (1874–1947), actor. People's Artist of the USSR (1937).
- Mikhail Tarkhanov (1877–1948), actor. People's Artist of the USSR (1937).

1934

- Pavel Andreev (1874–1950), opera singer. People's Artist of the USSR (1939).
- Agrippina Vaganova (1879–1951), ballet dancer
- Evgeny Lepkovsky (1866–1939), actor
- Leonid Savransky (1876–1966), singer (dramatic baritone)
- Nikolay Sinelnikov (1885–1939), actor
- Nikolai Sobolshchikov-Samarin (1868–1945), actor
- Elena Stepanova (1891–1978), opera singer. People's Artist of the USSR (1937).
- Vasily Tikhomirov (1878–1956), ballet dancer and choreographer
- Lev Steinberg (1870–1945) — conductor, composer. People's Artist of the USSR (1937).
- Nikolai Yakovlev (1869–1950), actor. People's Artist of the USSR (1944).

1935

- Boris Babochkin (1904–1975) — actor and director
- Vladimir Gardin (1877–1965) — actor and director
- Reinhold Glière (1875–1956), composer
- Boris Gorin-Goryainov (1883–1944), actor
- Alisa Koonen (1889–1974) — actress
- Solomon Mikhoels (1890–1948), actor, theater director
- Alexander Tairov (1885–1950) — actor and director

1936

- Samuil Samosud (1884–1964), conductor

1937

- Elena Gogoleva (1900–1993), actress
- Lydia Koreneva (1885–1982), actress
- Nikolai Kostromskoy (1874–1938), actor
- Mikhail Lenin (1880–1961), actor
- Vasily Lubentsov (1886–1975), singer
- Mikhail Narokov (1879–1958), actor
- Nikolai Ozerov (1887–1953), opera singer (lyric-dramatic tenor)
- Nikolai Rybnikov (1879–1956), actor
- Ruben Simonov (1899–1968), actor, theater and film director, teacher
- Yuri Fire (1890–1971), conductor
- Nikander Khanaev (1890–1974), opera singer
- Faina Shevchenko (1893–1971), theater and film actress

1938

- Olga Androvskaya (1898–1975), actress
- Boris Asafyev (1884–1949), composer
- Claudia Elanskaya (1898–1972), actress
- Vladimir Ershov (1896–1964), actor
- Anastasia Zueva (1896–1986), actress
- Boris Livanov (1904–1972), actor and director
- Leonid Nikolayev (1878–1942), pianist, composer
- Lev Pulver (1883–1970), composer and musician
- Vasily Sakhnovsky (1886–1945), theater director, theater critic
- Ivan Slonov (1882–1945), director
- Viktor Stanitsyn (1897–1976), actor, director
- Ilya Sudakov (1890–1969), actor and director
- Vasily Toporkov (1889–1970), actor and director

1939

- Aleksander Bryantsev (1883–1961), actor, theater director, founder and head of Russia's first theater for children.
- Vladimir Durov (1909–1972), circus performer, trainer.
- Pavel Zhuravlenko (1887–1948), opera artist (bass), operetta and cinema, concert performer and director
- Benjamin Zuskin (1899–1952), Jewish actor
- Sergey Migay (1888–1959) — opera singer, baritone.
- Nikolay Pechkovsky (1896–1966) — opera singer, tenor.
- Sofia Preobrazhenskaya (1904–1966) — opera singer (mezzo-soprano)
- Lev Pulver (1883–1970) — composer and musician
- Nikolai Simonov (1901–1973) — theater and film actor, theater director.
- Igamberdy Tashkent (1866–1963) — circus performer, tightrope walker.
- Nikolay Cherkasov (1903–1966), theater and film actor
- Boris Eder (1894–1970) — circus performer, trainer (tamer) of predatory animals, founder of the Soviet school of work with circus predators.

=== 1940s ===
1940

- Sergey Vasilenko (1872–1956), composer and conductor
- Pavel Gaideburov (1877–1960), actor
- Vladimir Kandelaki (1908–1994), singer (bass-baritone).
- Nadezhda Kemarskaya (1899–1984), opera singer (lyric-coloratura soprano).
- Arkady Polyakov (1893–1966), theater and film actor.
- Konstantin Skorobogatov (1887–1969), theater and film actor, theater director.
- Galina Ulanova (1910–1998), ballerina.
- Grigory Yaron (1893–1963), operetta artist, director

1941

- Maria Goldina (1899–1970), opera singer (mezzo-soprano) and teacher
- Konstantin Igumnov (1873–1948), pianist
- Maya Meltzer (1899–1984), opera singer, director

1942

- Yuri Zavadsky (1894–1977), director
- Nikolai Okhlopkov (1900–1967), actor, director
- Alexey Popov (1892–1961), director

1943

- Nikolai Golovanov (1891–1953), conductor
- Alexey Gribov (1902–1977), theater and film actor
- Mikhail Kedrov (1894–1972), actor, theater director
- Tsitselia Mansurova (1896–1976), actress
- Vera Maretskaya (1906–1978), actress
- Dmitry Orlov (1892–1955), theater actor
- Nina Sokolovskaya (1867–1952), actress

1944

- Osip Abdulov (1900–1953), theater and film actor, theater director
- Elena Granovskaya (1877–1968), actress
- Mikhail Zharov (1899–1981), actor
- Peter Kazmin (1892–1964), folklorist, choral conductor
- Arnold Margulyan (1879–1950), conductor
- Aleksander Orlov (1873–1948) — Russian and Soviet conductor
- Ivan Rostovtsev (1873–1947), director, actor
- Vasily Sofronov (1884–1960), actor
- Boris Sushkevich (1887–1946), director, actor

1945

- Nikolay Akimov (1901–1968) — theater artist, theater director, painter and book graphic artist
- Ivan Bersenev (1889–1951) — actor, theater director
- Nikolai Bogolyubov (1899–1980) — actor
- Leonid Volkov (1893–1976) — actor
- Konstantin Zubov (1888–1956) — actor, theater and film director, theater teacher
- Igor Ilyinsky (1901–1987) — actor, theater and film director, master of artistic expression (reader)
- Nikolai Petrov (director) (1890–1964), theater director
- Joseph Tolchanov (1891–1981), theater and film actor, theater director

1946

- Serafima Burman (1890–1976), actress
- Georgy Vasiliev (1892–1949), actor and theater director.
- Leonid Vivien (1887–1966), actor, theater director.
- Alexander Gedike (1877–1957), composer, organist, pianist.
- Sofia Giatsintova (1895–1982), actress and theater director.
- Anatoly Goryunov (1902–1951), actor
- Mikhail Derzhavin (1903–1951), actor
- Alexander Doroshenko (1874–1950), actor
- Boris Zakhava (1896–1976), theater director, actor
- Semyon Kozolupov (1884–1961), cellist.
- Stepan Muratov (1885–1957), actor and theater director.
- Alexander Sveshnikov (1890–1980), choral conductor.
- Vladimir Henkin (1883–1953), actor
- Alexander Khokhlov (1892–1966), theater and film actor

1947

- Elizaveta Alekseeva (1901–1972), theater actress
- Maria Babanova (1900–1983) theater and film actress
- Alexander Baturin (1904–1983), opera singer (bass-baritone).
- Mikhail Bolduman (1898–1983), theater and film actor
- Vasily Vanin (1898–1951), theater and film actor, theater director.
- Vladimir Volodin (1896–1958), theater and film actor
- Vladimir Voronov (1890–1985), actor
- Pavel Geraga (1892–1969), theater and film actor
- Alexey Dikiy (1889–1955), theater and film actor, theater director.
- Daria Zerkalova (1901–1982), dramatic actress
- Alexander Zrazhevsky (1886–1950), theater and film actor.
- Alexey Ivanov (1904–1982), opera singer
- Yakov Itin-Malyutin (1886–1964), theater and film actor.
- Nadezhda Kazantseva (1911-2000), singer (coloratura soprano).
- Olga Kovaleva (1881–1962), singer (contralto)
- Elena Kruglikova (1907–1982), opera singer (lyric soprano)
- Ivan Kuvykin (1893–1950), choirmaster.
- Grigory Leondor (1894–1959), theater actor and director.
- Olga Lepeshinskaya (1916-2008), ballerina
- Andrey Lobanov (1900–1959), theater director.
- Semyon Mezhinsky (1889–1978), actor
- Alexander Melik-Pashayev (1905–1964), conductor
- Nikolay Mordvinov (1901–1966), actor
- Panteleimon Nortsov (1900–1993), opera singer (lyric baritone)
- Georgii Nelepp (1904–1957), opera singer
- Sergey Obraztsov (1901–1992), actor and director of the puppet theater
- Vasily Orlov (1896–1974) — theater and film actor.
- Lyubov Orlova (1902–1975), theater and film actress
- Anna Orochko (1898–1965), theater and film actress, director
- Pavel Pol (1887–1955), theater and film actor
- Sergei Prokofiev (1891–1953), composer
- Faina Ranevskaya (1896–1984), actress
- Natalia Rozhdestvenskaya (1900–1997), singer (soprano).
- Lev Sverdlin (1901–1969), actor, theater director
- Nikolai Sereda (1890–1948), singer.
- Angelina Stepanova (1905-2000), theater and film actress.
- Boris Khaikin (1904–1978), conductor
- Alexandra Khalileeva (1907–1971), singer (lyric-coloratura soprano).
- Aram Khachaturian (1903–1978), composer
- Platon Tsesevich (1879–1958), opera artist (bass cantante), chamber singer.
- Alexander Cheban (1886–1954), theater and film actor, theater director.
- Yuri Shaporin (1887–1966), composer
- Vissarion Shebalin (1902–1963), composer.
- Dmitri Shostakovich (1906–1975), composer, pianist.
- Natalia Shpiller (1909–1995), opera singer.
- Maxim Strauch (1900–1974), actor, director.
- Mikhail Yanshin (1902–1976), actor, director

1948

- Boris Aleksandrov (1905–1994), composer, conductor
- Vera Bendina (1900–1974), actress
- Sergey Blinnikov (1901–1969), actor and director
- Vsevolod Verbitsky (1896–1951), actor
- Vladimir Gotovtsev (1885–1976), actor
- Nikolai Dorokhin (1905–1953), actor
- Alexey Zhiltsov (1895–1972), actor
- Alexander Komissarov (1904–1975), actor
- Anatoly Ktorov (1898–1980), actor.
- Ivan Kudryavtsev (1898–1966), actor.
- Nina Litovtseva (1878–1956), actress and director.
- Pavel Massalsky (1904–1979), actor.
- Boris Petker (1902–1983), actor.
- Vladimir Popov (1889–1968), actor.
- Vera Popova (1889–1983), actress.
- Maria Titova (1899–1994), actress.
- Sofia Halutina (1875–1960), actress

1949

- Nikolay Annenkov (1899–1999), theater and film actor
- Grigori Belov (1895–1965), theater and film actor
- Alexander Borisov (1905–1982), theater and film actor.
- Olga Viklandt (1911–1995), theater and film actress
- Vladimir Vladislavsky (1891–1970), theater and film actor
- Alexander Gruzinsky (1899–1968), theater and film actor
- Abdullah-Amin Zabuirov (1891–1963), Bashkir actor
- Stepan Kayukov (1898–1960), theater and film actor
- Georgy Kovrov (1891–1961), theater and film actor
- Vladimir Lebedev (1870–1952), storyteller, dramatic artist
- Nikolay Levkoev (1891–1982), actor
- Pyotr Leontiev (1883–1951), theater and film actor.
- Himaletdin Mingazhev (1889–1955), actor, playwright, theater theorist.
- Boris Olenin (1903–1961), theater actor
- Rostislav Plyatt (1908–1989), theater and film actor
- Nikolai Pokrovsky (1896–1961), actor and theater director
- Lev Prozorovsky (1880–1954), actor, theater director
- Nikolai Ryzhov (1900–1986), theater and film actor
- Alexander Sashin-Nikolsky (1894–1967), actor
- Sofya Fadeeva (1901–1989), theater and film actress
- Nikolai Shamin (1886–1966), theater and film actor
- Elena Shatrova (1892–1976), theater and film actress

=== 1950s ===
1950

- Khalil Abzhalilov (1896–1963), theater and film actor
- Boris Andreyev (1915–1982), theater and film actor
- Mikhail Astangov (1900–1965), theater and film actor
- Claudia Goncharenko-Goncharova (1894–1960), theater actress
- Alexander Dovzhenko (1894–1956), actor, director
- Isaak Dunayevsky (1900–1955), composer
- Alexander Zguridi (1904–1998), film director of popular science cinema
- Boris Ilyin (1901–1979), actor
- Pavel Karganov (1883–1961), actor
- Nikifor Kolofidin (1902–1978), actor
- Nikolai Kryuchkov (1911–1994), theater and film actor
- Yelena Kuzmina (1909–1979), film actress
- Ivan Lobanov (1891–1969), theater actor
- Valentina Sperantova (1904–1978), theater and film actress
- Boris Tenin (1905–1990), theater and film actor
- Maria Tokareva (1894–1965), actress
- Alexandra Chudinova (1896–1971), actress
- Nikolay Yakushenko (1897–1971), theater and film actor

1951

- Elizaveta Antonova (1904–1994), opera singer (contralto).
- Grigory Bolshakov (1904–1974), opera singer (tenor).
- Ivan Burlak (1893–1964), opera singer (baritone).
- Valery Bure-Nebelsen (1889–1955), theater actor.
- Mikhail Gabovich (1905–1965), ballet dancer
- Vera Davydova (1906–1993), opera singer (mezzo-soprano)
- Maria Domasheva (1875–1952), actress
- Natalia Dudinskaya (1912–2003), ballet dancer.
- Alexey Ermolaev (1910–1975), ballet dancer
- Rostislav Zakharov (1907–1984), choreographer and director
- Bronislava Zlatogorova (1904–1995), opera singer (contralto)
- Elena Karyakina (1904–1979), theater and film actress.
- Valentina Kibardina (1907–1988), theater and film actress
- Nikolai Kolesnikov (1898–1959), theater and film actor.
- Alexey Krivchenya (1910–1974), opera singer (bass)
- Alexander Larikov (1890–1960), theater and film actor
- Pavel Lisitsian (1911–2004), opera singer (baritone).
- Maria Maksakova Sr. (1902–1974), opera singer (lyrical mezzo-soprano)
- Asaf Messerer (1903–1992), ballet dancer, choreographer
- Vitaly Politsemako (1906–1967), theater and film actor
- Vladimir Ratomsky (1891–1965), theater and film actor
- Pyotr Selivanov (1905–1980), opera singer (baritone).
- Maria Semenova (1908-2010), ballerina
- Konstantin Sergeev (1910–1992), ballet dancer
- Yuri Tolubeyev (1906–1979), theater and film actor.
- Elizaveta Shumskaya (1905–1988), opera singer (lyric-coloratura soprano).
- Valentin Yantsat (1905–1967), theater and film actor

1952

- Andrey Abrikosov (1906–1973), theater and film actor
- Anastasia Leskova (1903–1990), actress
- Sergei Lukyanov (1910–1965), theater and film actor

1953

- Nikolai Mikhailov (1902–1969), actor, director
- Mikhail Nikolsky (1907–1971), actor, director, artist
- Sergey Papov (1904–1970), theater and film actor
- Sergey Romodanov (1899–1975), theater and film actor
- Yevgeny Samoylov (1912–2006), theater and film actor
- Vladimir Chestnokov (1904–1968), theater and film actor

1954

- Grigory Antoshenkov (1898–1970), actor.
- Grigory Ardarov (1888–1956), actor, director
- Natalia Belevtseva (1895–1974), actress of the Maly Theater
- Vladimir Belokurov (1904–1973), actor
- Pallady Bogdanov (1881–1971), choirmaster
- Nadezhda Borskaya (1885–1963), actress
- Nikolai Bravin (1883–1956), operetta artist
- Alexander Gauk (1893–1963), conductor, composer
- Judith Gleaser (1904–1968), actress
- Lyubov Dobrzhanskaya (1908–1980), theater and film actress
- Sergei Yeltsin (1897–1970), opera conductor.
- Elena Zhilina (1890–1963), actress
- Dmitry Kabalevsky (1904–1987), composer
- Grigory Kirillov (1900–1977), director
- Pyotr Konstantinov (1899–1973), actor
- Vladimir Lepko (1898–1963), actor
- Vladimir Lyubimov (1897–1971), theater and film actor
- Ivan Marin (1905–1983), theater and film actor
- Zaituna Nasretdinova (1923–2009), ballerina
- Claudia Polovikova (1896–1979), actress
- Yevgeny Samoylov (1912–2006), theater and film actor
- Nikolai Svobodin (1898–1965), actor
- Konstantin Sinitsyn (1912–1976), actor
- Lyudmila Skopina (1903–1992), actress
- Boris Smirnov (1908–1982), actor
- Boris Tolmazov (1912–1985), director and actor
- Alexander Khanov (1904–1983), actor
- Alexander Khovansky (1890–1962), actor
- Antony Khodursky (1903–1972), actor
- Tikhon Khrennikov (1913–2007), composer

1955

- Zaituna Bikbulatova (1908–1992), theater actress
- Banu Valeeva (1914–2003), opera singer (lyric-coloratura soprano)
- Valiakhmet Galimov (1908–1994), actor and director
- Boris Zhukovsky (1900–1963), actor
- Tatiana Zimina (b. 1928), ballerina
- Alexander Ilyinsky (1896–1956), operetta artist
- Galimjan Karamyshev (1903–1977), actor
- Nikolai Kolesnikov (1893—?), actor
- Viktor Koltsov (1898–1978), actor
- Viktor Kuznetsov (1911–1981), actor
- Veniamin Lizunov-Arkanov (1905–1973), singer
- Ivan Lyubozhnov (1909–1988), actor, reader
- Vasili Merkuryev (1904–1978), theater and film actor
- Bariyat Muradova (1914-2001), actress
- Ekaterina Myazina (1898–1963), actress
- Lydia Myasnikova (1911–2005), opera singer
- Vassili Nebolsin (1898–1958), conductor.
- Lev Oborin (1907–1974), pianist
- Grigory Oskotsky-Gross (1901–1959), operetta artist
- Nadezhda Petipa-Chizhova (1896–1977), actress
- Ivan Petrov (1920–2003), opera singer
- Sviatoslav Richter (1915–1997), pianist
- Khalaf Safiullin (1921–1965), ballet dancer
- Vladislav Sokolovsky (1898–1964), actor
- Guzel Suleymanova (1927–1969), ballerina
- Alexander Sutyagin (1915–1991), opera singer
- Gabdrakhman Khabibullin (1904–1969), singer
- Vasily Tselikovsky (1900–1958), conductor

1956

- Ivan Alekseev (1913–1990), singer
- Svyatoslav Astafyev (1907–1990), actor
- Sergey Balashov (1903–1989), pop artist, master of artistic expression
- Veniamin Bityutsky (1902–1980), actor
- Mikhail Buyny (1903–1975), actor
- Nadezhda Goncharova (1902–1963), actress
- Elizaveta Dalskaya (1899–1962), actress
- Zara Dolukhanova (1918–2007), singer
- Konstantin Ivanov (1907–1984), conductor
- Olga Kaziko (1900–1963), actress
- Olga Kashevarova (1905–1977), singer
- Konstantin Laptev (1904–1990), singer
- Fyodor Lopukhov (1886–1973), ballet dancer, choreographer
- Leonid Makariev (1892–1975), actor and director
- Georgy Menglet (1912-2001), actor
- Heinrich Neuhaus (1888–1964), pianist
- Valentina Nikitina (1895–1975), theater actress
- Maya Plisetskaya (1925-2015), ballerina
- Vasily Razumov (1892–1973), actor
- Vera Redlich (1894–1992), actress and director
- Nina Rusinova (1896–1986), actress
- Nadezhda Slonova (1906–2002), actress
- Raisa Struchkova (1925–2005), ballerina
- Georgy Tovstonogov (1913–1989), director, People's Artist of the USSR (1957)
- Vladimir Thapsaev (1910–1981), Ossetian theater and film actor
- Vera Firsova, (1918–1993), opera singer
- Zoya Shebuyeva-Chekmasova (1900–2007), actress
- Ksenia Erdeli (1878–1971), harpist, People's Artist of the USSR (1966)
- Lavrenty Yaroshenko (1909–1975), singer

1957

- Elena Agaronova (1903–1985), actress
- Victor Ageev (1887–1962), actor
- Mikhail Arensky (1895–1980), actor
- Sergey Biryukov (1897–1962), actor
- Nikifor Boykinya (1901–1998), opera singer
- Boris Bregvadze (1926-2012), ballet dancer, choreographer
- Sergey Brzhesky (1900–1985), theater actor
- Ivan Bugaev (1919–1980), opera singer
- Galiya Bulatova (1906–1985), actress
- Munira Bulatova (1914-2011), singer
- Eugenia Wolf-Israel (1897–1975), actress
- Naydana Gendunova (1913–1984), actress of the Buryat Drama Theater
- Spiridon Grigoriev (1910–1986), chief director of the Yakut Musical Drama Theater.
- Edouard Grikurov (1907–1982), conductor
- Lilia Gritsenko (1917–1989), theater and film actress
- Nikolay Gritsenko (1912–1979), theater and film actor
- Niyaz Dautov (1913–1986), opera singer
- Vera Dubrovina (1917-2000), ballet dancer
- Irina Zarubina (1907–1976), theater and film actress
- Inna Zubkovskaya (1923-2001), ballerina
- Kira Ivanova-Golovko (1919-2017), actress
- Nina Kazarinova (1907–1999), actress
- Kamal III (1900–1968), actor
- Aleksander Kasyanov (1891–1982), composer
- Kuratsa Kashirgova (1899–1974), harmonica player
- Mikhail Kolesov (1895–1965), actor
- Alexander Kolobaev (1901–1980), actor
- Mikhail Kondratiev (1906–1984), actor
- Tatyana Lavrova (1911–2004), opera singer (lyric-coloratura soprano)
- Olga Lebzak (1914–1983), actress
- Leonid Lukov (1909–1963) — film director
- Askold Makarov (1925-2000), ballet dancer
- Irina Maslennikova (1918-2013), opera singer
- Vano Muradeli (1908–1970), composer
- Fakhri Nasretdinov (1911–1986), opera singer
- Alexander Nikitin (1908–1984), chief director of the Rostov Regional Drama Theater named after M. Gorky
- Nikolai Plotnikov (1897–1979), actor, director
- Boris Pokrovsky (1912–2009), opera director
- Elena Ponsova (1907–1966), actress
- Daniil Pokhitonov (1878–1957), conductor
- Nikolai Prozorov (1907–1988), actor
- Alexander Ptushko (1900–1973), film director, cinematographer, animator, screenwriter, artist
- Arkady Raikin (1911–1987), actor, director
- Natalia Rashevskaya (1893–1962), actress and director
- Maryam Rahmankulova (1901–1990), singer (mezzo-soprano) and composer
- Alexandra Remizova (1903–1989), actress
- Pyotr Reshetnikov (1915–1960), actor of the Yakut Musical Drama Theater.
- Sirkka Rikka (1912–2002), singer
- Nikolai Rodionov (1906-2000), actor
- Toivo Romppainen (1901–1976), actor
- Magafura Saligaskarova (1922-2015), singer
- Georgy Salnikov (1909–1983), theater actor
- Pavel Serebryakov (1909–1977), pianist
- Boris Smirnov (1908–1982), actor
- Nikolai Smirnov-Sokolsky (1898–1962), actor
- Tamara Smirnova-Valentinova (1911—??), actress
- Evgeny Sokovnin (1904–1973), opera director.
- Vasily Solovyov-Sedoy (1907–1979), composer
- Nikolay Sosnin (1884–1962), actor
- Mukharbi Sonov (1916–1957), actor
- Galina Stanislavova (1920–2003), opera singer
- Anna Strizhova (1898–1971), actress
- Elizaveta Tima-Kachalova (1884–1968), actress
- Elizaveta Tomberg (1909–1988), actress, People's Artist of the USSR (1959)
- Vladimir Uskov (1907–1980), actor
- Tatiana Ustinova (1909–1999), Chief choreographer of the M. E. Pyatnitsky State Russian Drama Choir.
- Boris Fenster (1916–1960), ballet dancer
- Bruno Freundlich (1909–2002), actor
- Fuad Khalitov (1909–1981), actor
- Vasily Khvatov (1891–1975), director and conductor of the orchestra of the M. E. Pyatnitsky State Russian Folk Choir.
- Gabdulla Shamukov (1909–1981), theater actor
- Sergei Shaposhnikov (1911–1973), opera singer
- Georgy Shebuyev (1891–1974), actor
- Alla Shelest (1919–1998), ballerina
- Nisson Shkarovsky (1904–1964), conductor
- Ninel Yultieva (1926-2014), ballerina
- Elena Junger (1910–1999), actress
- Sergey Yutkevich (1904–1985), film director, People's Artist of the USSR (1962)
- Irma Jaunzem (1897–1975), chamber singer
- Ivan Yashugin (1907–1992), singer (bass)

1958

- Viktor Akimov (1902–1980), actor
- Vladimir Andrianov (1906–1985), Soviet actor and theater director
- Suren Babloev (1918–1979), choral conductor, People's Artist of the USSR (1978)
- Leonid Baratov (1895–1964), Soviet theater director
- Irina Bugrimova (1910-2001), circus performer and trainer
- Ivan Vutiras (1914–1976), singer
- Lev Golovanov (1926-2015), dancer
- Boris Dolin (1903–1976), film director
- Anna Egorova (1915–1995), singer
- Isidor Zak (1909–1998), conductor
- Tamara Seifert (1918–2005), dancer
- Yulia Zolotareva (1929-2010), opera singer
- Ivan Kartashov (1909–1981), ballet dancer
- Pyotr Kirsanov (1902–1977), actor
- Maria Knebel (1898–1985), actress, director, theater teacher
- Georgy Kolyshkin (1904–1985), choral conductor
- Galina Kramova (1900–1974), actress
- Lydia Krupenina (Grevtsova) (1928-2016), ballet dancer.
- Kuzma Lozhkin (1909–1981), actor
- Anatoly Lyudmilin (1903–1966), conductor
- Konstantin Massalitinov (1905–1979), choral conductor
- Alexander Mashkov (1909–1999), actor
- Maria Mordasova (1915–1997), singer
- Konstantin Nassonov (1895–1963), actor
- Pyotr Nekrasov (1889–1963), actor, director
- Valery Nelsky (1906–1990), dramatic actor
- Tamara Oganezova (1895–1976), theater actress
- Stepan Ozhigin (1916–1992), theater actor
- Vera Okuneva (1891–1976), actress
- Alexander Pastunov (1906–1960), actor
- Oleg Popov (1930-2016), circus performer, clown
- Emile Renard-Kio (1894–1965), illusionist
- Mikhail Rumyantsev (1901–1983), circus performer
- Vladislav Sokolov (1908–1993), choral conductor, People's Artist of the USSR (1966)
- Mikhail Tuganov (1900–1974), circus performer
- Joseph Tumanov (1909–1981), actor, theater director
- Leonid Utesov (1895–1982), singer, actor, People's Artist of the USSR (1965).
- Valentin Filatov (1920–1979), circus performer
- Alexey Chernov (1908–1979), theater and film actor.
- Firs Shishigin (1908–1985), theater director

1959

- Vasily Alchevsky (1904–1975), operetta artist
- Serafim Anikeev (1904–1962), theater and film actor
- Badma Baldakov (1918–1974), opera singer
- Veronika Borisenko (1918–1995), opera singer
- Buda Vampilov (1920–2002), actor
- Leonid Gallis (1911–1977), theater and film actor
- Choizhi-Nima Geninov (1907–1965), actor of the Buryat Drama Theater.
- Vladimir Zeldin (1915-2016), theater and film actor
- Zinaida Zorich (1892–1971), dramatic actress
- Vladimir Ivanovsky (1912–2004) — opera singer
- Daria Karpova (1914–2003), actress
- Leonid Lavrovsky (1905–1967). Choreographer, People's Artist of the USSR (1965)
- Toivo Lankinen (1907–1970), actor
- Lydia Mosolova (1918–1996), actress
- Nadezhda Nadezhdina (1908–1979), ballerina, choreographer
- Alexander Ognivtsev (1920–1981), opera singer
- Alexander Parchment (1906–1969), theater director
- Nadezhda Petrova (1919-2011), singer
- Andrey Popov (1918–1983), theater and film actor, director
- Valentin Popov (1907–1987), singer
- Grigori Roshal (1899–1983), film director
- Larisa Sakhyanova (1930-2001), ballerina, People's Artist of the USSR (1963)
- Helmer-Rainer Sinisalo (1920–1989), composer and flutist
- Antonina Sobolshchikova-Samarina (1892–1971), actress, People's Artist of the USSR (1968)
- Vladimir Halmatov (1912–1969), actor
- Vsevolod Yakut (1912–1991), theater and film actor
- Nikolai Yanet (1893–1978), operetta artist

=== 1960 ===
- Rabadan Abakarov (1917–1995), circus performer, tightrope walker, acrobat
- Ekaterina Alexandrovskaya (1899–1973), theater and film actress
- Boris Alekseev (1911–1973), theater actor
- Lyudmila Antonyuk (1921-2001), theater and film actress
- Evgeny Belyaev (1926–1994), singer
- Konstantin Vinogradov (1899–1980), choirmaster
- Olga Vlasova (1906–1993), operetta actress
- Yaragi Hajikurbanov (1917–1997), circus performer, tightrope walker
- Meer Gerst (1908–1986), director
- Feodosia Dembitskaya (1901–2002), actress
- Nikolai Dubinsky (1911–1973), actor
- Veronika Dudarova (1916–2009), conductor
- Vladimir Dudin (1909–1982), director
- Kuna Dyshekova (1917–2003), actress
- Dmitry Zhuravlev (1900–1991), actor, master of artistic expression
- Ivan Zagorsky (1899–1973), actor, director
- Mikhail Zimbovsky (1889–1970), dramatic actor
- Alexander Ivanov (1898–1984), film director, People's Artist of the USSR (1964)
- Serafima Ikaeva (1909–1993), actress
- Galina Isaeva (1915–2006), ballerina
- Varvara Karginova (1908–1975), theater and film actress
- Tamara Kariayeva (1915–1989), actress
- Tatiana Karpova (1916-2018), actress
- Vladimir Kozel (1919–1988), theater and film actor
- Antonina Kolotilova (1890–1962), choirmaster
- Irina Kolpakova (born 1933), ballerina
- Georgy Kugushev (1896–1971), actor and director
- Alim Kurumov (1911–1974) was a Kumyk theater actor and director.
- Muradkhan Kukhmazov (1914–1986), actor
- Martin Lusinyan (1896–1983), operetta artist
- Anatoly Marenich (1905–1972), operetta artist
- Vasily Mikhailov (1898–1961), actor
- Zainab Nabieva (1912–1994), actress
- Nikolai Nepokoychitsky (1910–1969), theater actor
- Vera Orlova (1918–1993), theater actress
- Alla Osipenko (born 1932), ballet dancer
- Tatiana Peltzer (1904–1992), theater and film actress, later People's Artist of the USSR
- Sergey Prostyakov (1911–1997), actor
- Alexey Sergeev (1919–1998), singer, People's Artist of the USSR (1967)
- Elena Fadeeva (1914–1999), theater and film actress
- Yuli Khmelnitsky (1904–1997), director
- Lyudmila Chernysheva (1908–1963), actress

== Miscellaneous ==
This title is not to be confused with the title which is spelled in Russian Народный художник РСФСР, and which was granted for achievements in the visual arts.
