= The Three Million Trial =

1926 film by Yakov Protazanov

- Directed by: Yakov Protazanov
- Written by: Yakov Protazanov; Umberto Notari (play)
- Starring: Igor Ilyinsky; Anatoly Ktorov; Mikhail Klimov; Olga Zhizneva
- Cinematography: Pyotr Yermolov
- Production company: Mezhrabpom-Russ
- Release dates: 23 August 1926 (USSR); 29 October 1933 (USA)
- Running time: 66 minutes (1,931 metres)
- Country: Soviet Union
- Language: Silent film (Russian intertitles)

The Three Million Trial (Russian: Процесс о трех миллионах) is a 1926 Soviet silent comedy film starring Igor Ilyinsky and directed by Yakov Protazanov based on the play The Three Thieves (Italian: I tre ladri) by Umberto Notari. It was also released as Three Thieves in the United States.

== Plot ==
The Three Million Trial (1926)

The story takes place in early 20th-century Italy. Banker Ornano (Mikhail Klimov) sells his house for three million rubles, but since it's the weekend, he cannot deposit the money in the bank and must carry it with him. He leaves the city for his country home for a short period, but returns immediately, worried about the money. Meanwhile, his wife, Noris, sends a note to her lover, informing him of the three million rubles in the house. However, the note is intercepted due to the machinations of one of the three thieves at the center of the film.

The note falls into the hands of Cascarilla (Anatoly Ktorov), a suave thief and adventurer, who quickly devises a plan to steal the money. At the same time, Tapioca (Igor Ilyinsky), a small-time burglar, breaks into the house on the same night, unknowingly complicating Cascarilla's scheme.

As Cascarilla tries to charm Noris and claim the fortune, Tapioca inadvertently disrupts the plan. When the two criminals argue over the spoils, Ornano unexpectedly returns, and the police arrest Tapioca while Cascarilla manages to escape.

The story reaches its climax in a courtroom trial, where Cascarilla plans to free Tapioca. He throws a suitcase of counterfeit money into the courtroom, causing a distraction. Amid the confusion, Cascarilla quietly helps Tapioca escape, giving him a share of the stolen money before parting ways.

== Cast ==
- Igor Ilyinsky – Tapioka
- Anatoly Ktorov – Cascarilla
- Mikhail Klimov – Ornano, the Banker
- Olga Zhizneva – Noris, the Banker's wife
- Nikolai Prozorovsky – Guido
- Vladimir Fogel – Man with binoculars
