= Yakov Protazanov =

Russian film director and screenwriter

- Яков Протазанов
- Born: 23 January 1881; Moscow, Russian Empire
- Died: 8 August 1945 (aged 64); Moscow, Russian SFSR, Soviet Union
- Resting place: Novodevichy Cemetery
- Occupations: Film director; screenwriter
- Years active: 1907–1943
- Notable work: The Queen of Spades (1916); Aelita (1924); St. Jorgen's Day (1930)
- Spouse: Frida Protazanova

Yakov Alexandrovich Protazanov (Russian: Яков Александрович Протазанов; 4 February (O.S. 23 January) 1881 – 8 August 1945) was a Russian and Soviet film director and screenwriter, and one of the founding fathers of cinema of Russia. He was an Honored Artist of the Russian SFSR (1935) and Uzbek SSR (1944).

== Biography ==
Born in the Vinokurov family estate to educated Russian parents, both of whom belonged to the merchantry social class. His father Alexander Savvich Protazanov came from a long generation of merchants and was a hereditary distinguished citizen of Kiev (an inherited privilege first granted to Yakov's great-grandfather, a merchant also named Yakov Protazanov who moved with his family to Kiev from Bronnitsy). Alexander worked with the Shibaev brothers of the family of Old Believers whose father Sidor Shibaev was among the pioneers of the oil industry.

Yakov's mother Elizaveta Mikhailovna Protazanova (nee Vinokurova) was a native Muscovite. She finished the Elizabeth Institute for Noble Maidens. Her brother Mikhail Vinokurov was close friends with the Sadovsky theatrical family and made a great impact on young Protazanov.

In 1900 Yakov graduated from the Moscow Commercial College and started working as a merchant, although he wasn't happy about his choice of profession. In 1904 he left Russia and spent several years in France and Italy, self-educating. After his return in 1906 Protazanov joined the Gloria film company in Moscow as a screenwriter and director's assistant. He also met his future wife there — Frida Vasilievna Kennike, who happened to be a sister of one of the Gloria's co-founders.

In 1910 Gloria became part of the cinema factory headed by Paul Thiemann and Friedrich Reinhardt. Protazanov was finally given a director's chair, although, according to his memories, he took part in basically every filming process, including cinematography, stage property and bookkeeping. His most notable works of that period are The Song of the Prophet Oleg based on Alexander Pushkin's poem and Departure of a Grand Old Man about the last days of Leo Tolstoy. In 1914 he joined Joseph N. Ermolieff's film studio where he worked up till his emigration in 1920.

In the period between 1911 and 1920 Protazanov wrote and directed some 80 features, including The Queen of Spades (1916) and Father Sergius (1918), which have been acclaimed as his masterpieces. Ivan Mozhukhin starred in many of his early films.

He emigrated to Europe in 1920 following the Russian Civil War along with Ermolieff's group where he worked at various French- and German-based film studios. He returned to Russia in 1923. The following year he produced his most well-known film Aelita, based on Alexei Tolstoy's novel. It was one of the first science fiction movies to depict a space flight and an alien society.

His next film The Tailor from Torzhok was released to a great success and established him as one of the leading comedy directors. He discovered many talents, such as Igor Ilyinsky, Mikhail Zharov, Anatoli Ktorov, Vera Maretskaya, Yuliya Solntseva, Georgy Millyar, Serafima Birman, Nikolai Batalov and Mikhail Klimov. One of the most popular Russian fairy tale directors Alexander Rou also started as Protazanov's assistant.

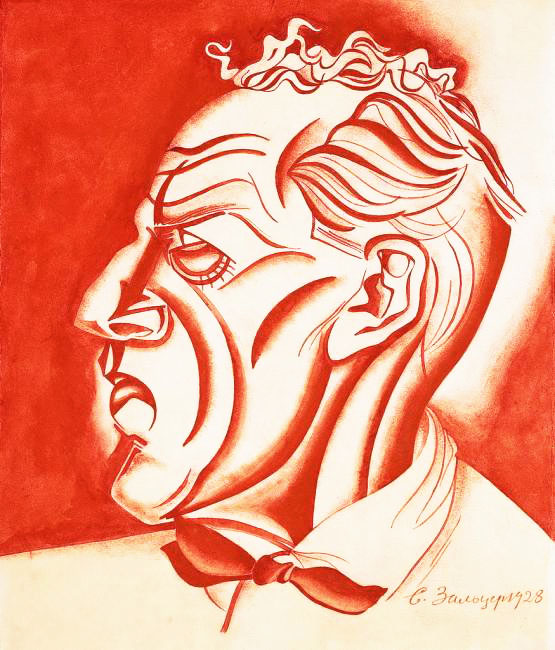
Yakov Protazanov, 1928

In 1928 he directed The White Eagle that featured Vsevolod Meyerhold and Vasili Kachalov in the leading roles — one of their rare appearances on the big screen. His last acclaimed feature was a screen version of Alexander Ostrovsky's play Without Dowry in 1937. The cast featured many celebrated actors from the Maly Theatre.

During the Great Patriotic War he was evacuated to Tashkent along with some other members of Mosfilm and Lenfilm. Around the same time his health started declining; on his way to Tashkent he suffered a heart attack. He managed to produce only one more movie — Nasreddin in Bukhara (1943) – itself set in Uzbekistan.

His only son Georgy was killed in one of the final battles, which also affected Protazanov. He spent his last days working on the adaptation of Alexander Ostrovsky's comedy play Wolves and Sheep. Among his other plans were film adaptations of War and Peace and Oliver Twist.

Protazanov died on 8 August 1945 and was buried at the Novodevichy Cemetery. He was survived by his wife Frida and his elder sisters – Lidia Aristova, Valentina Protazanova and Nina Anjaparidze.

== Selected filmography ==
- Departure of a Grand Old Man (1912)
- The Queen of Spades (1916)
- Satan Triumphant (1917)
- Father Sergius (1918)
- The Pilgrimage of Love (1923)
- Aelita (1924)
- The Tailor from Torzhok (1925)
- His Call (1925)
- The Case of the Three Million (1926)
- Man from the Restaurant (1927)
- The Forty-first (1927)
- Don Diego and Pelagia (1928)
- The White Eagle (1928)
- Ranks and People (1929); co-directed with Mikhail Doller
- St. Jorgen's Day (1930)
- Tommy (1931)
- Marionettes (1934)
- About Oddities of Love (1936)
- Without Dowry (1937)
- Salavat Yulayev (1941)
- Nasreddin in Bukhara (1943)
