= List of Soviet films of 1927 =

A list of films produced in the Soviet Union in 1927 (see 1927 in film).

== 1927 ==
| Title | Russian title | Director | Cast | Genre | Notes |
|---|---|---|---|---|---|
1927
| Anne | Аня | Olga Preobrazhenskaya | | | |
| Bed and Sofa | Третья Мещанская | Abram Room | Lyudmila Semyonova, Nikolai Batalov | Satire | discusses polygamy, abortion |
| The Big Cockroach | Тараканище | Alexander Ivanov | | Animation | Lost film |
| The Club of the Big Deed | Союз Великого дела | Grigori Kozintsev, Leonid Trauberg | Sergei Gerasimov, Andrei Kostrichkin, Pyotr Sobolevsky, Oleg Zhakov, Yanina Zhejmo | History, drama | |
| The Decembrists | Декабристы | Aleksandr Ivanovsky | Vladimir Maksimov, Yevgeni Boronikhin, Varvara Annenkova | Drama | |
| The Diplomatic Pouch | Сумка дипкурьера | Alexander Dovzhenko | M. Buyukli, A. Klymenko, Heorhii Zelondzhev-Shypov | Thriller | |
| The End of St. Petersburg | Конец Санкт-Петербурга | Vsevolod Pudovkin | Aleksandr Chistiakov | History, drama, action | |
| The Forty-First | Сорок первый | Yakov Protazanov | Ada Vojtsik, Ivan Koval-Samborsky | War film | |
| The Girl from a Far River | Девушка с далекой реки | Yevgeni Chervyakov | Roza Sverdlova | Drama | |
| The Girl with a Hatbox | Девушка с коробкой | Boris Barnet | Anna Sten, Vladimir Mikhailov, Vladimir Fogel | Romantic comedy | |
| Jews on Land | Евреи на земле | Abram Room | | Documentary, short | |
| In the Quagmire | В трясине | Ivane Perestiani | Pavel Yesikovsky | Drama | |
| A Kiss from Mary Pickford | Поцелуй Мэри Пикфорд | Sergei Komarov | Igor Ilyinsky, Anel Sudakevich, Mary Pickford, Douglas Fairbanks, Vera Malinovskaya | Comedy | |
| Little Brother | Братишка | Grigori Kozintsev and Leonid Trauberg | Pyotr Sobolevsky, Yanina Zhejmo, Sergei Martinson, Andrei Kostrichkin, Sergei Gerasimov | Comedy | Lost film |
| Man from the Restaurant | Человек из ресторана | Yakov Protazanov | Michael Chekhov, Vera Malinovskaya, Ivan Koval-Samborsky | Drama | |
| Moscow in October | Москва в Октябре | Boris Barnet | Boris Barnet, Ivan Bobrov, Aleksandr Gromov, Vasili Nikandrov | Drama, history, biopic | Partially lost |
| The Poet and the Tsar | Поэт и Царь | Vladimir Gardin and Yevgeni Chervyakov | Yevgeni Chervyakov | | |
| Prostitute | Проститутка | Oleg Frelikh | Vera Georgiyevna Orlova, Olga Bonus, E. Yarosh | Drama | |
| His Excellency | Его превосходительство | Grigori Roshal | Leonid Leonidov, Mariya Sinelnikova, Yuliy Untershlak | Drama | |
| The Slave | Раба | Arkadi Yalovoy | Hasmik, B. Madatova, Nina Manucharyan | Drama | |
| Somebody Else's Coat | Чужой пиджак | Boris Shpis | Andrei Kostrichkin, Sergei Gerasimov, Pyotr Sobolevsky, Yanina Zhejmo, Tamara Makarova | Comedy | |
| Three Friends and an Invention | Два друга, модель и подруга | Alexei Popov | S. Lavrentyev, Alexei Popov, Olga Tretyakova | Comedy, romance | |
| The Whirlpool | Водоворот | Pavel Petrov-Bytov | Tatyana Guretskaya | | |
| The Yellow Ticket | Земля в плену | Fyodor Otsep | Anna Sten | Drama | |
| Your Acquaintance | Ваша знакомая | Lev Kuleshov | Aleksandra Khokhlova | Drama | Lost film |
| Women of Ryazan | Бабы рязанские | Ivan Pravov, Olga Preobrazhenskaya | Kuzma Yastrebitsky, Olga Narbekova, Yelena Maksimova | Drama | |
| Zare | Зарэ | Hamo Beknazarian | Maria Tenazi, Hrachia Nersisyan, Avet Avetisyan | Drama | |
| Zvenigora | Звeнигopа | Alexander Dovzhenko | Georgi Astafyev | Drama | |

== See also ==
- 1927 in the Soviet Union
