= List of Soviet films of 1931 =

A list of films released in the Soviet Union in 1931 (see 1931 in film).

Title	Russian title	Director	Cast	Genre	Notes
1931
Alone	Одна	Grigori Kozintsev and Leonid Trauberg	Yelena Kuzmina, Pyotr Sobolevsky, Sergei Gerasimov	Drama	
And Quiet Flows the Don	Тихий Дон	Ivan Pravov and Olga Preobrazhenskaya			
Anush	Ануш	Ivan Perestiani			Armenian SSR
The Dam	Плотина	Vladimir Petrov			lost film
Deed of Valour	Дело доблести	Mikheil Gelovani			
Enthusiasm	Энтузиазм: Симфония Донбасса	Dziga Vertov			
Fire	Огонь	Mark Donskoy			lost film
Forty Hearts	Сорок сердец	Lev Kuleshov		Drama	
Golden Mountains	Златые горы	Sergei Yutkevich	Boris Poslavsky	Drama	
Iron Brigade	Железная бригада	Dmitri Vasilyev and Mikhail Verner			lost film
Italian	Итальянка	Leonid Lukov			
Komsomol is my Motherland	Родина моя — комсомол	Leonid Lukov		Documentary	
A Lad from the Banks of the Missouri	Парень с берегов Миссури	Vladimir Braun			
Mine 12-28	Шахта 12-28	Aleksei Kapler			
Nail in the Boot	Гвоздь в сапоге	Mikhail Kalatozov			
Noon	Полдень	Iosif Kheifits and Aleksandr Zarkhi			
Out of the Way!	Хабарда	Mikheil Chiaureli			
Road to Life	Путевка в жизнь	Nikolai Ekk	Nikolai Batalov, Yvan Kyrlya	Drama	
Roots of Commune	Корешки коммуны	Leonid Lukov			
Rubicon	Рубикон	Vladimir Vajnshtok			lost film
Sniper	Снайпер	Semyon Timoshenko	Boris Shlikhting	Drama	
The Thaw	Ледолом	Boris Barnet			
Tommy	Томми	Yakov Protazanov	Aleksei Temerin	Drama	

== See also ==
- 1931 in the Soviet Union
