= Gogoliad =

1973 unfinished score by Dmitri Shostakovich

- Unfinished film score by Dmitri Shostakovich
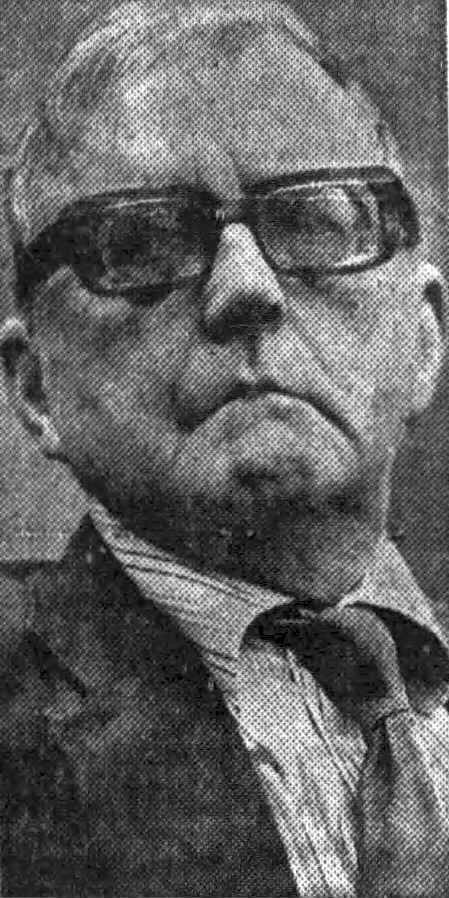
- Shostakovich in June 1973
- Native name: Гоголиада
- Composed: March–May 1973
- Published: Unpublished
- Scoring: Orchestra

Gogoliad (Russian: Гоголиада, romanized: Gogoliada), also referred to as Saint Petersburg Days (Russian: Петербургские дни, romanized: Peterburgskiye dni), and Petersburg Tales (Russian: Петербургские повести, romanized: Peterburgskiye povesti), is an unfinished film score composed by Dmitri Shostakovich. It was intended for the namesake film that was to have been directed by Grigori Kozintsev.

== Background ==
=== Origins ===
Dmitri Shostakovich and Grigori Kozintsev first began working with each other on the film The New Babylon in 1929. Shortly after the film's premiere, the director was invited to attend rehearsals for Shostakovich's opera The Nose, based on the namesake short story by Nikolai Gogol, at the Maly Opera in Leningrad. He was impressed by how "the Gogolesque fantasmagoria turned into noise and light" in the opera. After a lapse of over thirty years, the opera began to be revived around the world in the early 1960s. One of these productions was mounted in 1969 at the Deutsche Staatsoper in East Berlin, from which an in-house tape was made that was presented to the composer.

=== Development ===
Kozintsev notated his first ideas for what would become Gogoliad on November 2, 1969, during production of his King Lear. His initial sketch revolved around Akaki Akakievich Bashmachkin, the central character from "The Overcoat" by Nikolai Gogol, one of the stories in the collection Petersburg Tales. In 1926, Kozintsev had directed with Leonid Trauberg a silent film based on the same story. In a subsequent note made on December 29, 1969, Kozintsev said he envisioned Gogoliad to be a musical film which would depict Saint Petersburg similarly to how New York City was portrayed in West Side Story. Other reference points for the development of the film included 8½, Rosemary's Baby, and Zabriskie Point.

The director also sought to express how quotidian life gives way to explosions of emotions like catastrophes; a quality he felt was the essence of Russian art as descended from Gogol, through Fyodor Dostoyevsky, Vsevolod Meyerhold, and finally to Shostakovich. A notebook entry from March 3, 1971, stated that Kozintsev wanted Shostakovich to provide music similar in tone to that of his recent works, in particular the Fourteenth Symphony.

=== Composition ===
In March 1973, Kozintsev discussed The Nose with Shostakovich, which led to the subject of the Gogoliad. Over the course of the next two months, Shostakovich worked on sketches and outlines for the film's score. Kozintsev hoped to apply Shostakovich's structural conception of his opera The Nose to the new film. He described the film as a "symphony" which would weave together various strands of Gogol's art. At the head of the draft for the script, Kozintsev noted that the film needed to be worked out in close cooperation with Shostakovich. They agreed to begin pre-production work in late 1973, after the composer returned from a trip to the United States. He presented the director with a copy of the Deutsche Staatsoper's recording of The Nose for study.

Their project ended when Kozintsev died on May 11, 1973. Shostakovich learned while traveling of Kozintsev's death. "What I shall do for cinema now, I don't know", he said to Izvestia. John Riley, author of a monograph on Shostakovich's film music, observed that the unrealized Gogoliad "closed the loop [of the composer's film career] in two ways: with the director who... had been his first cinema collaborator; and with Gogol, the writer who had brought them together".

In early 1975, Shostakovich reported that he was contemplating working on a diptych consisting of operas based on The Overcoat and Anton Chekhov's The Black Monk.
