= Andrei Moskvin =

Soviet cinematographer

Andrei Nikolayevich Moskvin (Russian: Андрей Николаевич Москвин; 14 February 1901, Tsarskoye Selo – 28 February 1961, Leningrad) was a Soviet cinematographer, renowned for his work with Grigori Kozintsev and Leonid Trauberg.

== Selected filmography ==
- The Devil's Wheel (1926); directed by Grigori Kozintsev and Leonid Trauberg
- The Overcoat (1926); directed by Grigori Kozintsev and Leonid Trauberg
- Somebody Else's Coat (1927); directed by Boris Shpis
- The Club of the Big Deed (1927); directed by Grigori Kozintsev and Leonid Trauberg
- Little Brother (1927); directed by Grigori Kozintsev and Leonid Trauberg
- The New Babylon (1929); directed by Grigori Kozintsev and Leonid Trauberg
- Alone (1931); directed by Grigori Kozintsev and Leonid Trauberg
- The Youth of Maxim (1935); directed by Grigori Kozintsev and Leonid Trauberg
- The Return of Maxim (1937); directed by Grigori Kozintsev and Leonid Trauberg
- The Vyborg Side (1938); directed by Grigori Kozintsev and Leonid Trauberg
- The Young Fritz (1943); directed by Grigori Kozintsev and Leonid Trauberg
- Actress (1943); directed by Leonid Trauberg
- Ivan the Terrible (1945); directed by Sergei Eisenstein
- Simple People (1946); directed by Grigori Kozintsev and Leonid Trauberg
- Pirogov (1947); directed by Grigori Kozintsev
- Belinsky (1953); directed by Grigori Kozintsev
- The Gadfly (1955); directed by Aleksandr Faintsimmer
- Stories About Lenin (1957); directed by Sergei Yutkevich
- Don Quixote (1957); directed by Grigori Kozintsev
- The Lady with the Dog (1960); directed by Iosif Kheifits
