= Whirlpool (disambiguation) =

A whirlpool is a swirling body of water.

Whirlpool may also refer to:

== Films ==
- Whirlpool (1934 film), a 1934 American drama film directed by Roy William Neill
- Whirlpool (1949 film), a 1949 American film directed by Otto Preminger
- Whirlpool (1959 film), a 1959 film directed by Lewis Allen, starring O. W. Fischer and Juliette Gréco
- Whirlpool (1970 film), a 1970 thriller film directed by José Ramón Larraz
- The Whirlpool (1918 film), a 1918 American crime drama film directed by Alan Crosland
- The Whirlpool (1927 film), a 1927 Soviet silent film
- The Whirlpool (2022 film), a 2022 Russian mystical thriller film

== Music ==
- Krútňava or The Whirlpool, a 1949 opera by Eugen Suchoň
- Whirlpool, a Buckethead album
- Whirlpool (Chapterhouse album)
- Whirlpool (Some Velvet Sidewalk album)
- "Whirlpool" (song), a 1991 song by the Meat Puppets
- Whirlpool, a 1990s British band signed to Creation Records and featuring Gem Archer

== Novels ==
- The Whirlpool (Urquhart novel), a 1986 novel by Jane Urquhart
- The Whirlpool (Gissing novel), an 1897 novel by George Gissing

== Other uses ==
- The whirlpool bath, an alternate name for a hot tub
- Whirlpool tub, a bathtub
- Whirlpool Corporation, a household appliance manufacturer
- Whirlpool (hash function), a cryptographic hash function
- Whirlpool Galaxy, aka M51, located in the constellation Canes Venatici
- Whirlpool (website), an Australian website for broadband users
- Niagara Whirlpool, a giant whirlpool on the Canadian side of the Niagara River
