= List of Soviet films of the 1930s =

A list of films produced in the Soviet Union between 1930 and 1939:

== 1930s ==
- Soviet films of 1930
- Soviet films of 1931
- Soviet films of 1932
- Soviet films of 1933
- Soviet films of 1934
- Soviet films of 1935
- Soviet films of 1936
- Soviet films of 1937
- Soviet films of 1938
- Soviet films of 1939

== See also ==
- Cinema of the Soviet Union
- Censorship in the Soviet Union
