= The Vyborg Side =

1939 film by Grigori Kozintsev and Leonid Trauberg

- Film poster
- Directed by: Grigori Kozintsev; Leonid Trauberg
- Written by: Grigori Kozintsev; Leonid Trauberg; Lev Slavin
- Starring: Boris Chirkov
- Cinematography: Andrei Moskvin; Georgi Filatov
- Production company: Lenfilm
- Release date: 2 February 1939
- Running time: 3277 meters (121 minutes)
- Country: Soviet Union
- Language: Russian

The Vyborg Side full film

The Vyborg Side (Russian: Выборгская сторона, romanized: Vyborgskaya storona) is a 1939 Soviet drama film directed by Grigori Kozintsev and Leonid Trauberg, the final part of trilogy about the life of a young factory worker, Maxim. It was preceded by The Youth of Maxim (1935) and The Return of Maxim (1937). The film was also released in the United States under the title New Horizons.

== Background ==
The Vyborg Side is a traditional industrial area in Saint Petersburg, Russia, on the right bank of the River Neva delta. It is named because of its situation at the start of the road to Vyborg, a formerly important city taken from Swedish Empire by Russian army under Peter I in early 18 century during the Great Northern War and securing the existence of Russia's new capital Saint Petersburg. The Vyborg Side was filled with industrial enterprises of different complexity, producing sugar, textiles, timber and later, since the 19th century, many kinds of heavy industry products. There were factories e.g. by Ericsson and the Nobel family. Working and living conditions for workmen were varied, but generally considered harsh, and illegal Socialist propaganda of various political factions successfully spread among workers in the last decades of 19th century and early decades of the 20th century. There were strikes, and World War I caused both battle losses and famine in the city. Not surprisingly factory workers supported in 1917 the February revolution that overthrew monarchy and the October Revolution that promised to end private ownership of factories and actually of workers' lives. People's militia was formed on the Vyborg Side to counteract any attempts of counter revolution and maintain public order. These detachments were called Red Guards. Vladimir Lenin before the October Revolution returned from hiding in semi-autonomous Finland to a safe house on the Vyborg Side, from whence on the eve of the revolution he was conducted to the revolutionary headquarters in Smolny by a Finnish bodyguard of his to head the developments.

== Plot ==
The film begins with Red Guards, led by Maksim, storming the Winter Palace during the October Revolution. Following the revolution, Maksim is appointed State Commissar in charge of the national bank. Faced with sabotaging underlings who destroy and hide vital documents, Maksim dedicates himself to learning the complexities of banking and restoring order. With the support of a small team, he manages to stabilize operations and sign the first budget of the Soviet state.

Meanwhile, SR conspirator Ropshin and the anarchist Dymba incite a raid on wine warehouses, drawing in Evdokia, a soldier's widow desperate for survival. Maksim intervenes to halt the chaos and has Dymba arrested. Later, with Evdokia’s assistance, Maksim uncovers a conspiracy by a group of tsarist officers planning to assassinate Lenin on the day of the Constituent Assembly's opening. Maksim thwarts the plot, ensuring Lenin's safety.

As the Civil War intensifies, Maksim joins the Red Army in its struggle against German occupation. His transition from a revolutionary to a defender of the new Soviet state underscores his commitment to the cause and his pivotal role in the early days of the republic.

== Cast ==
- Boris Chirkov - Maksim
- Valentina Kibardina - Natasha
- Mikhail Zharov - Platon Vassilievich Dymba
- Natalya Uzhviy - Yevdokia Ivanovna Kozlova
- Yuri Tolubeyev - Yegor Bugai
- Anatoli Kuznetsov - Worker's Deputy Turayev
- Boris Zhukovsky - Defense Attorney
- Aleksandr Chistyakov - Mishchenko
- Nikolai Kryuchkov - soldier
- Vasili Merkuryev - student
- Mikheil Gelovani - Stalin
- Leonid Lyubashevsky - Sverdlov
- Maksim Shtraukh - Lenin
- Ivan Nazarov - Lapshin
- Dmitri Dudnikov - Ropshin
