= Boris Shpis =

Soviet film director and screenwriter

- Born: Boris Vasilyevich Shpis; 1903
- Died: 1939
- Occupation: Film director
- Years active: 1924–1935

Boris Vasilyevich Shpis (Russian: Борис Васильевич Шпис; 1903–1939) was a Soviet film director and screenwriter.

== Biography ==
Boris Shpis was a stage designer who joined Grigori Kozintsev and Leonid Trauberg's Factory of the Eccentric Actor (FEKS) in 1924 and worked as assistant director in all their films up to and including The Club of the Big Deed. When in 1927 Kozintsev and Trauberg decided not to continue work on the comedy Somebody Else's Coat, Shpis persuaded them to let him finish the film. The film, however, has not been released and is considered to be lost.

In 1928 Boris Shpis started to work as director, first at Soyuzkino studios (now Lenfilm) and later, together with Rashel Milman, at Belgoskino Studio (now Belarusfilm). In 1937 Shpis and Milman returned to Lenfilm to reorganize and lead all film editing done at the Studio. But soon, in the Great Purge, Boris Shpis was arrested and shot.

== Filmography ==
Director

- Somebody Else's Coat (1927)
- Blue Collars (1928)
- Snow Boys (1928)
- Road into the World (1929)
- Avenger (1930)
- The Return of Nathan Becker (1932); co-directed with Rashel Milman
- Engineer Goff (1935); co-directed with Rashel Milman

Screenwriter

- Road into the World (1929)
- Avenger (1930)
- The Return of Nathan Becker (1932)

Actor

- The Overcoat (1926)
