= Mishki versus Yudenich =

1925 film by Grigori Kozintsev and Leonid Trauberg

- Directed by: Grigori Kozintsev; Leonid Trauberg
- Written by: Grigori Kozintsev; Leonid Trauberg
- Starring: Aleksandr Zavyalov
- Cinematography: Fridrikh Verigo-Darovsky
- Production company: Sevzapkino
- Release date: 23 May 1925
- Running time: 2,650 meters (25 minutes)
- Country: Soviet Union
- Languages: Silent film Russian intertitles

Mishki versus Yudenich (Russian: Мишки против Юденича, romanized: Mishki protiv Yudenicha) is a 1925 Soviet silent comedy film directed by Grigori Kozintsev and Leonid Trauberg. Acting debut of Yanina Zhejmo. The film is believed to be lost.

== Plot ==
The film is a comedy about adventures of a boy named Mishka and a bear at the headquarters of General Nikolai Yudenich during the Russian Civil War, which had been fought between 1917 and 1922.

== Cast ==
- Alexander Zavyalov as Mishka, paperboy
- Polina Pona as white spy
- Sergei Gerasimov as shpik
- Andrei Kostrichkin as shpik
- Yevgeny Kumeyko as General Yudenich
- Emil Gal as photographer
- Yanina Zhejmo as youngster
