= Alexander Grinberg =

Russian photographer

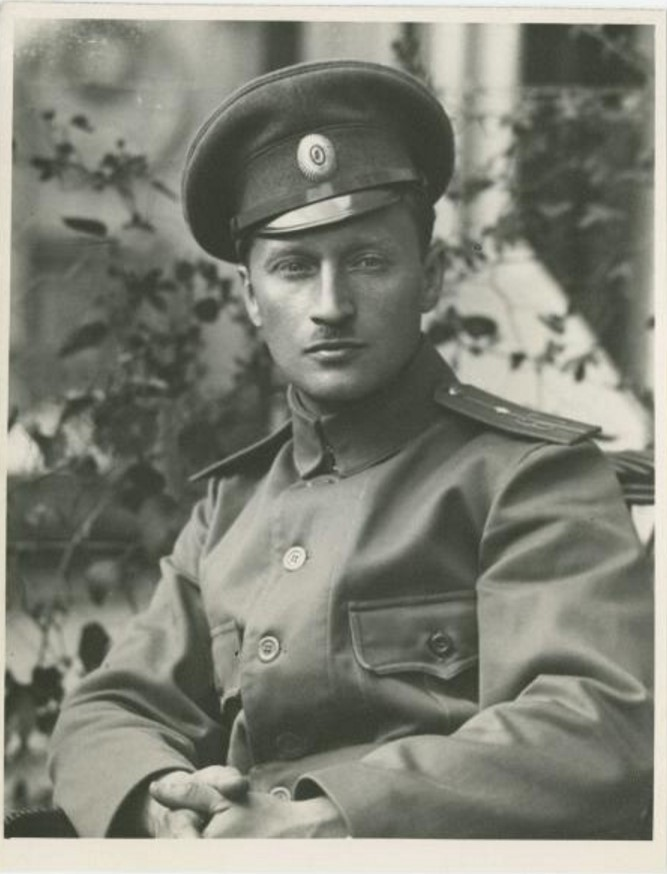

Aleksandr Danilovich Grinberg (Russian: Александр Данилович Гринберг; 1885–1979) was a photographer. In 1908 he was awarded the silver medal in the all-Russian photo exhibition in Moscow and the gold medal in the international photo-exhibition in Dresden.

Since 1929, the year of the "Great Break", with the turn in the Soviet politics toward arts, his erotic photography was declared inappropriate for Soviet morale, as a feature of the "overindulged idleness of the rich". His works came under increasing criticism in the context of government views of socialist morality. Nevertheless, he risked exhibitions of semi-naked women, and was eventually sentenced to Gulag labor camps (1936–1939) "for distribution of pornography".

== Filmography ==
- 1921 — Story of Seven Who Were Hanged
- 1926 — A Descendant of an Arab
- 1927 — Three Friends and an Invention
