= The Adventures of Oktyabrina =

1924 film by Grigori Kozintsev and Leonid Trauberg

- Directed by: Grigori Kozintsev; Leonid Trauberg
- Written by: Grigori Kozintsev; Leonid Trauberg
- Cinematography: Fridrikh Verigo-Darovsky; Ivan Frolov
- Production companies: Sevzapkino; FEKS
- Release date: 9 December 1924
- Running time: 980 meters (35 minutes)
- Country: Soviet Union
- Languages: Silent film Russian subtitles

The Adventures of Oktyabrina (Russian: Похождения Октябрины, romanized: Pokhozhdeniya Oktyabriny) is a 1924 Soviet/Russian silent film, an eccentric comedy, directed by Grigori Kozintsev and Leonid Trauberg. This film is presumed lost, as it and many other early Russian films are believed to have been destroyed in a studio fire in 1925.

FEKS (ФЭКС) stands for «Фабрика эксцентрического актёра», "Factory of the Eccentric Actor", and The Adventures of Oktyabrina was their first work.

== Synopsis ==
Oktyabrina, a female Komsomol member and a building superintendent evict a "Nepman" to the roof of the building for persistent non-payment of the rent. There the Nepman opens a bottle of beer, from which a "Coolidge Kerzonovich Poincaré" emerges. The name is concocted to be an epitome of evil, made from the names of the anti-Soviet politicians of the time, routinely bashed in the Soviet press. Together the Nepman and the genie plot to rob Gosbank, but are deterred by Oktyabrina with the help of fellow Komsomol members and engineering marvels of the time.

== Cast ==
- Zinaida Tarakhovskaya – Oktyabrina
- Yevgeny Kumeiko – Nepman
- Sergey Martinson – Coolidge Kerzonovich Poincaré
- Antonio Tserep – Advertiser
- Fyodor Knorre – MOPR member
- Yevgeny Kyaksht – Pope
- Nikolai Boyarchikov – Janitor
