= Hamlet (1964 film) =

1964 film by Grigori Kozintsev

- Directed by: Grigori Kozintsev; Iosif Shapiro (co-director)
- Written by: William Shakespeare; Boris Pasternak; Grigori Kozintsev
- Starring: Innokenty Smoktunovsky; Mikhail Nazvanov; Elza Radziņa; Anastasiya Vertinskaya
- Cinematography: Jonas Gricius
- Music by: Dmitri Shostakovich
- Distributed by: Lenfilm
- Release date: June 24, 1964
- Running time: 140 minutes
- Country: Soviet Union
- Language: Russian

Hamlet (Russian: Гамлет, romanized: Gamlet) is a 1964 film adaptation in Russian of William Shakespeare's play of the same title, based on a translation by Boris Pasternak. It was directed by Grigori Kozintsev and Iosif Shapiro, and stars Innokenty Smoktunovsky as Prince Hamlet.

== Premise ==
Kozintsev's film is faithful to the architecture of the play, but the text (based on Pasternak's translation) is heavily truncated, achieving a total running time of 2 hours 20 minutes (from a play which can last as long as four hours in full performance). The opening scene of the play is cut entirely, along with scenes 1 and 6 of Act IV, but other scenes are represented in sequence, even though some are drastically shortened. (Hamlet's final speech is reduced simply to "The rest is silence.") There is some resequencing of material in Act IV to illustrate the outwitting of Rosencrantz and Guildenstern on the voyage to England. Kozintsev seeks constantly to represent the content of the play in visual terms, and there are notable sequences which are constructed without the use of dialogue (e.g. the opening scene in which Hamlet arrives at Elsinore to join the court's mourning, and the vigil awaiting the appearance of the ghost).

Unlike Laurence Olivier's 1948 film, which removed most of the play's political dimension to focus on Hamlet's inner turmoil, Kozintsev's Hamlet is as political and public as it is personal. Kozintsev observed of his predecessor: "Olivier cut the theme of government, which I find extremely interesting. I will not yield a single point from this line." Where Olivier had narrow winding stairwells, Kozintsev has broad avenues, peopled with ambassadors and courtiers. The castle's role as a prison is emphasised. The camera frequently looks through bars and grates, and one critic has suggested that the image of Ophelia in an iron farthingale symbolises the fate of the sensitive and intelligent in the film's tough political environment. The film also shows the presence of ordinary people in ragged clothes, who are like the grave digger: good-hearted and only wishing to live peacefully.

== Cast ==
Kozintsev cast some actors whose first language was not Russian (the Latvian Elza Radziņa as Gertrude, and Estonians Rein Aren, Ants Lauter and Aadu Krevald) so as to bring shades of other traditions into his film. But for the central role, he chose the Russian actor Innokenty Smoktunovsky who had extensive experience in the theatre. Traditional in appearance, he nevertheless had an individual manner of acting, characterised by reserve as well as nervous intensity, which distinguished the film from other versions.

- Prince Hamlet — Innokenty Smoktunovsky
- Claudius — Mikhail Nazvanov
- Gertrude — Elza Radziņa
- Polonius — Yuri Tolubeyev
- Laertes — Stepan Oleksenko
- Ophelia — Anastasiya Vertinskaya
- Horatio — Vladimir Erenberg
- Rosencrantz — Igor Dmitriev
- Guildenstern — Vadim Medvedev
- Fortinbras — Aadu Krevald

== Production ==
=== Background ===
Grigori Kozintsev had been a founder member of the Russian avant-garde artist group the Factory of the Eccentric Actor (FEKS), whose ideas were closely related to Dadaism and Futurism. In 1923 he had been planning to perform Hamlet as a pantomime in the experimental manner of FEKS, but the plan was not put into effect, and Kozintsev's energies shifted into the cinema. However, he returned to the theatre in 1941 with a Leningrad production of King Lear. Then, in 1954 Kozintsev directed a stage production of Hamlet at the Pushkin Theatre in Leningrad, using Boris Pasternak's translation; this was one of the first Soviet productions of the play in the post-Joseph Stalin era.

Kozintsev also wrote extensively about Shakespeare and a major chapter in his book Shakespeare: Time and Conscience is devoted to his thoughts on Hamlet together with a historical survey of earlier interpretations. In an appendix entitled "Ten Years with Hamlet", he includes extracts from his diaries dealing with his experiences of the 1954 stage production and his 1964 film.

=== Cinematography ===
Although shot in black-and-white, this was the first film version of the play in a widescreen format (Sovscope, an anamorphic system similar to CinemaScope) and stereophonic sound (4-track stereo). The camera is continually mobile and extended shots (average length 24 seconds) enable the physical exploration of the spaces of the court and castle. Of the castle itself, Kozintsev said: "The general view of the castle must not be filmed. The image will appear only in the unity of the sensations of Elsinore's various aspects. And its external appearance, in the montage of the sequences filmed in a variety of places". Many of the exteriors were filmed at the fortress of Ivangorod, on the border between the Russian and Estonian SSRs.

Much of the film takes place out of doors. Apart from the backdrop of the castle, the imagery of the film is dominated by elements of nature. Kozintsev saw this as a vital way in which he could give visual form to the text: "Strangely enough they have always sought to film Hamlet in studios, but it seems to me that the key to reincarnating Shakespeare's words in visual imagery can only be found in nature". "It seems that the basic elements of the plastic arts are formed against a background of nature. In decisive places, they should oust period stylization (of the Tudor era, and of English affectation) and express the essentials. I have in mind stone, iron, fire, earth, and sea". These elements are present throughout, including the opening shot in which the cliff-top castle is represented by its shadow falling across the surging waters of the sea, and the final scene in which Hamlet walks out of the dark palace to sit against the rock facing the sea as he dies.

== Release ==
The film was released in June 1964 while Nikita Khrushchev was first secretary of the USSR.

== Critical reception ==
Innokenty Smoktunovsky as Hamlet.

When the film appeared in 1964, it received a number of prizes both in the Soviet Union and abroad (see below). Soviet director Fridrikh Ermler praised the film for its realism, scenery, and social messaging. He contrasted Smoktunovsky's Hamlet with Laurence Olivier's in the 1948 film, who sits on the throne and is hailed as king just before his death: "Our Hamlet is an enemy to all of Elsinore, to the kingdom of violence, inhumanity, and lies. Reconciliation is impossible." Lyudmila Pogozheva also referred to the realism of the film and its emphasis on "questions near to and important for our times." She described the lead actor's performance as particularly suited to the film's overall purpose: "Everything that Smoktunovsky does in the film is absolutely far from poses, declamations, 'plays', from theatrical cothurnus and theatrical emphasis. Everything is simple, elegant, psychologically motivated, vital, direct."

Its reception among British and American reviewers was generally favourable, despite the fact that this version of a prized work of English literature was not made in English. The New York Times reviewer took up this point: "But the lack of this aural stimulation—of Shakespeare's eloquent words—is recompensed in some measure by a splendid and stirring musical score by Dmitri Shostakovich. This has great dignity and depth, and at times an appropriate wildness or becoming levity". The author noted the strengths of the film: [Kozintsev] "is concerned with engrossing the eye. And this he does with a fine achievement of pictorial plasticity and power.... Landscape and architecture, climate and atmosphere play roles in this black-and-white picture that are almost as important as those the actors play".

In academic literature, the film has continued to receive prominent attention in studies of the methods of filming Shakespeare, especially in a play which consists so much of internal thought.

The British director Peter Brook regarded the film as being of special interest, even though he had reservations about its ultimate success: "The Russian Hamlet has been criticized for being academic, and it is: however, it has one gigantic merit—everything in it is related to the director's search for the sense of the play—his structure is inseparable from his meaning. The strength of the film is in Kozintsev's ability to realise his own conception with clarity.... But the limitation lies in its style; when all is said and done, the Soviet Hamlet is post-Eisenstein realistic—thus super-romantic—thus, a far cry from essential Shakespeare—which is neither epic, nor barbaric, nor colorful, nor abstract nor realistic in any of our uses of the words."

The film was released twice in the USA (1964, 1966), though only excerpts from the film have been shown on U.S. television. In the UK the film was nominated for BAFTA awards in 1965, for Best Film and for Best Actor, and it was shown for many years in repertory at London's Academy Cinema, in its annual Shakespeare season.

== Awards ==
- 1964 Special Jury Prize of Venice Film Festival (Won) - Grigori Kozintsev.
- 1964 Golden Lion of Venice Film Festival (Nominated) - Grigori Kozintsev.
- 1964 Best film on the Wiesbaden Shakespeare Film Festival.
- 1964 On the All-Union Film Festival
  - Special Jury Prize for The outstanding realization of the Shakespeare's tragedy and best music - Dmitri Shostakovich.
  - Prizes of the Soviet Union of Painters - E. Yeney, S. Virsaladze.
  - Prize of the Soviet Union of Cinematographers - Innokenty Smoktunovsky.
- 1965 USSR State Prize (Won) - Grigori Kozintsev, Innokenty Smoktunovsky.
- 1966 BAFTA Award for Best Film (Nominated) - Grigori Kozintsev.
- 1966 BAFTA Film Award for Best Foreign Actor (Nominated) - Innokenty Smoktunovsky.
- 1966 Special Jury Prize of San Sebastian Film Festival (Won) and Prize of the Nation Federation of film societies of Spain.
- 1967 Golden Globe for Best Foreign-Language Foreign Film (Nominated).

== Notes and references ==
=== Sources ===
- Catania, Saviour (2001). ""The Beached Verge": On Filming the Unfilmable in Grigori Kozintsev's Hamlet" (PDF). EnterText. 1 (2). Brunel University: 302–16. ISSN 1472-3085. Archived from the original (PDF) on 2015-09-23.
- Collick, John (1989). "Grigori Kozintsev's Hamlet and Korol Ler". Shakespeare, Cinema and Society. Manchester University Press. pp. 128–49. ISBN 9780719024481.
- Crowther, Bosley (15 September 1964). "Hamlet (1964)". The New York Times.
- Eidsvik, Charles (1980). "Thought in film: the case of Kozintsev's Hamlet". West Virginia University Philological Papers. 26. West Virginia University: 74–82. ISSN 0362-3009.
- Guntner, J. Lawrence (2000). "Hamlet, Macbeth and King Lear on Film". In Jackson, Russell (ed.). The Cambridge Companion to Shakespeare on Film. Cambridge University Press. pp. 120–40. ISBN 9780521639750.
- Kott, Jan (1979). "On Kozintsev's Hamlet". Literary Review. 22: 383–407.
- Kozintsev, Grigori (1967). Shakespeare: Time and Conscience. Translated by Joyce Vining. London: Dennis Dobson. OCLC 147034.
- Reeves, Geoffrey; Brook, Peter (1966). "Finding Shakespeare on Film. From an Interview with Peter Brook". Tulane Drama Review. 11 (1). The MIT Press: 117–21. doi:10.2307/1125272. ISSN 0886-800X. JSTOR 1125272.
- Sokolyansky, Mark (2007). "Grigori Kozintsev's Hamlet and King Lear". In Jackson, Russell (ed.). The Cambridge Companion to Shakespeare on Film. Cambridge University Press. pp. 203–15. ISBN 9780521685016.
