= I Love You, Life! =

- Russian: Люблю тебя, жизнь!
- Directed by: Mikhail Yershov
- Written by: Mikhail Berestinsky
- Starring: Gennadi Vernov; Ariadna Shengelaia; Irina Bunina; Aleksey Kozhevnikov; Galina Inyutina
- Cinematography: Vladimir Burykin
- Edited by: Mariya Bernatskaya
- Music by: Oleg Karavaychuk
- Release date: 1960
- Running time: 86 minute
- Country: Soviet Union
- Language: Russian

I Love You, Life! (Russian: Люблю тебя, жизнь!) is a 1960 Soviet anti-religious drama film directed by Mikhail Yershov.

The film tells about Timofey Korneyev, who works in a confectionery factory and decides to join the party. One day he meets an unusual boy named Yegor, who mumbles something about God. Timofey learns that Yegor's grandfather leads the Jehovah's sect. Moreover, Grunya, who works with Timofey in the same factory, also goes to this sect. Timofey considers it necessary to free them.

== Plot ==
In late 1950s Leningrad, young engineer Timofey Korneyev works at a confectionery factory. A recent member of the Communist Party, he strives to improve workplace culture and simplify operations in the most challenging departments. His efforts gain the support of the factory director, although they approach problem-solving in different ways.

By chance, Timofey meets a boy named Yegorka and his dying grandfather. He soon discovers that their home serves as a gathering place for Jehovah’s Witnesses. Determined to rescue the boy from their influence, Timofey takes action to remove him from the situation. Despite the arrival of Terenty, who intends to take over the grandfather’s role in watching over Yegorka, Timofey successfully brings the boy into his care.

At the same factory, Grunya, a deeply religious young woman who attended the Jehovah’s Witness meetings, works in the chocolate department. She catches the attention of Zhenya Sukhorukov, the factory’s resourceful and romantic supply manager and Timofey’s loyal friend. Zhenya delicately and patiently tries to win Grunya’s affection, showing her a different way of life. Gradually, Grunya overcomes her initial distrust and ultimately leaves behind her past beliefs for a new path.

== Cast ==
- Gennadi Vernov as Timofey Borisovich Korneyev (as G. Vernov)
- Ariadna Shengelaia as Lena Topilina (as A. Shengelaya)
- Irina Bunina as Grunya (as I. Bunina)
- Aleksey Kozhevnikov as Zhenya Sukhorukov (as A. Kozhevnikov)
- Galina Inyutina as Zinaida Mikhaylovna Topilina (as G. Inyutina)
- Vladimir Chestnokov as Pavel Nikolayevich Topilin (as V. Chestnokov)
- Vera Kuznetsova as Kseniya Grigoryevna Korneyeva (as V. Kuznetsova)
- Maya Blinova as Galysheva (as M. Blinova)
- Aleksandr Afanasev as Terentiy (as A. Afanasyev)
