= Boris Chirkov =

Soviet actor (1901–1982)

- Борис Чирков
- Chirkov on a 2026 postcard of Russia
- Born: 13 August 1901; Brianka, Yekaterinoslav Governorate, Russian Empire (present-day Ukraine)
- Died: 28 May 1982 (aged 80); Moscow, Russian SFSR, Soviet Union
- Occupations: Actor, pedagogue
- Years active: 1926–1982

Boris Petrovich Chirkov (Note: Russian: Борис Петрович Чирков, romanized: Boris Petrovich Chirkov) (13 August 1901 – 28 May 1982) was a Soviet and Russian actor and pedagogue.

Chirkov was awarded the Hero of Socialist Labor title (1975) and three Orders of Lenin (1938, 1967, 1975). For his movie roles, he won four Stalin Prizes (1941, 1947, 1949, 1952) and a Stanislavski Prize (1979).

== Life and career ==
Chirkov was born in Brianka on 13 August 1901. He graduated from the Leningrad Institute of Stage Arts in 1926. He appeared in 50 films between 1928 and 1975. From 1945-1950 he was director of Moscow Theatre-Studio of the Film Actor.

Chirkov was especially celebrated for his performances in the Maksim trilogy: The Youth of Maxim (1935), The Return of Maxim (1937), and The Vyborg Side (1938). He was awarded Stanislavsky State Prize of the RSFSR (1979), two Stalin Prizes first degree (1941, 1952) and two Stalin Prizes second degree (1947, 1949). People's Artist of the USSR (1950) and Hero of Socialist Labour (1975). Chirkov died in Moscow on 28 May 1982.

== Selected filmography ==
- My Son (1928) – Patashon
- Luna sleva (1929) – Orskiy
- Rodnoy brat (1929) – Grishka
- Alone (1931) – Man Talking on the Phone
- Pesnya o shchastye (1934) – Chief disciplinary section
- Chapaev (1934) – Peasant
- The Youth of Maxim (1935) – Maksim
- Girl Friends (1936) – Senka
- Lenochka i vinograd (1936)
- The Return of Maxim (1937) – Maksim
- The Defense of Volotchayevsk (1937) – Old Man
- The Great Citizen (1938) – Maksim, the investigator
- Chelovek s ruzhyom (1938) – Yevtushenko
- The Vyborg Side (1938) – Maksim
- Minin and Pozharsky (1939) – Roman
- The New Teacher (1939) – Stepan Ivanovich Lautin
- Boyevoy kinosbornik 3 (1941) – (segment "Antosha Rybkin")
- This Is the Enemy (1942)
- Aleksandr Parkhomenko (1942) – Nestor Makhno
- Antosha Rybkin (1942) – Antosha Rybkin
- The Front (1943) – Udivitelnyy
- Partizany v stepyakh Ukrainy (1943) – Grandfather Taras
- Kutuzov (1944) – Lavilov
- Ivan Nikulin: Russian Sailor (1945) – Zakhar Fomichyov
- The Great Glinka (1946) – Mikhail Ivanovich Glinka
- The Court of Honor (1948) – Andrey Vereyskiy akademik
- Three Encounters (1949) – Nikanor Samoseev
- Dream of a Cossack (1951) – Kondratyev
- The Miners of Donetsk (1951) – Stepan Nedolya
- The Boarder (1953)
- True Friends (1954) – Chishov
- Dimitrovgradtsy (1956) – Sobolev
- For the Power of the Soviets (1956) – Secreatary Chernoivanenko
- Svoimi rukami (1956) – Rudenko
- Ryadom s nami (1958) – Stletov
- Dorogoy moy chelovek (1958)
- Kievlyanka (1958) – Yakov Petrovich Sereda
- Mechty sbyvayutsya (1959) – Pavel Andreyevich Leshchuk
- Poteryannaya fotografiya (1959)
- Nasledniki (1960)
- Svoya golova na plechakh (1961) – Kolkhoz Chairman
- Gorizont (1962) – Likhobaba
- A Trip Without a Load (1963) - Ded na aerodrome
- Greshnyy angel (1963) – Religioznyy starik
- Kain XVIII (1963) – Lavatory Worker
- The Alive and the Dead (1964) – Gavrila Biryukov
- Möcüzälär adasi (1964)
- Golubaya chashka (1964)
- Artakarg handznararutyun (1966) – Police spy
- Pervyy posetitel (1966)
- Myatezhnaya zastava (1967)
- Seven Old Men and a Girl (1970, TV Movie)
- Shutite? (1971) – (segment "Vanderbul' bezhit za gorizont")
- Izhorskiy batalon (1972) – Vanechka
- Po sobstvennomu zhelaniyu (1973)
- Rosa (1975)
- Gorozhane (1976) – Stariy master
