= Pirogov (film) =

1947 film by Grigori Kozintsev

- Directed by: Grigori Kozintsev
- Written by: Yury German
- Starring: Konstantin Skorobogatov; Vladimir Chestnokov
- Cinematography: Andrei Moskvin; Anatoli Nazarov; Naum Shifrin
- Music by: Dmitri Shostakovich
- Production company: Lenfilm
- Release date: 16 December 1947
- Running time: 92 minutes
- Country: Soviet Union
- Language: Russian

Pirogov (Russian: Пирогов) is a 1947 Soviet biopic film directed by Grigori Kozintsev, based on the life of Russian scientist and doctor Nikolay Ivanovich Pirogov (1810-1881). Pirogov is famous for being the founder of field surgery. It was Kozintsev's first solo directorial feature film.

== Cast ==
- Konstantin Skorobogatov - Pirogov
- Vladimir Chestnokov - Ipatov
- Sergei Yarov - Skulachenko
- Aleksei Dikiy
- Olga Lebzak - Vakulyna
- Nikolay Cherkasov - Lyadov
- Andrei Kostrichkin
- Tatyana Piletskaya - Vakulyna
