= Pyotr Sobolevsky =

Soviet actor

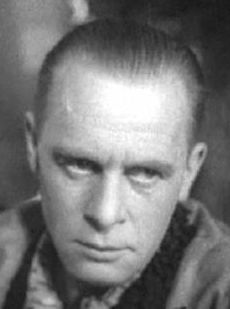
- Born: Pyotr Stanislavovich Sobolevsky; 22 May 1904; Tomsk, Tomsk Governorate, Russian Empire (now Russia)
- Died: 26 July 1977 (aged 73); Moscow, Soviet Union (now Russia)
- Occupation: Actor
- Years active: 1926–1973

Pyotr Stanislavovich Sobolevsky (Russian: Пётр Станиславович Соболевский; 22 May 1904 – 26 July 1977) was a Soviet actor. He appeared in more than 50 films between 1926 and 1973.

== Biography ==
Sobolevsky was born on 22 May 1904 in Tomsk. He studied at the Factory of the Eccentric Actor (FEKS) under Grigori Kozintsev and Leonid Trauberg. He graduated from the Leningrad Institute of Theater in 1932. Pyotr Sobolevsky died on 26 June 1977 in Moscow and was buried at Vvedenskoye Cemetery.

== Selected filmography ==
- The Devil's Wheel (1926)
- The Overcoat (1926)
- Somebody Else's Coat (1927)
- The Club of the Big Deed (1927)
- Little Brother (1927)
- The New Babylon (1929)
- Alone (1931)
- Sniper (1931)
- To Live (1933)
- Ball and Heart (1935)
- The Sailors of Kronstadt (1936)
- Minin and Pozharsky (1939)
- Behind Enemy Lines (1941)
- Two Friends (1941)
- Moscow Skies (1944)
- Golden Path (1945)
- Admiral Nakhimov (1946)
- Maksimka (1952)
- Admiral Ushakov (1953)
- The Secret of Two Oceans (1956)
- The First Date (1960)
- Alyosha's Love (1960)
- The Duel (1961)
- Optimistic Tragedy (1963)
- Strong with Spirit (1967)
- Turn On the Polar Lights (1972)
