= Yuri Tolubeyev =

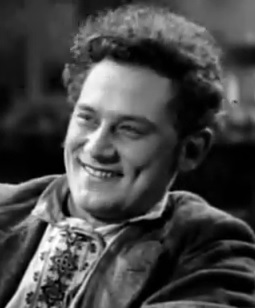
- Born: 1 May 1906; St. Petersburg, Russian Empire
- Died: 28 December 1979 (aged 73); Leningrad, RSFSR, USSR

Yuri Vladimirovich Tolubeyev (Russian: Юрий Владимирович Толубеев, May 1, 1906, St. Petersburg, Russian Empire - December 28, 1979, Leningrad, USSR) was a Soviet theatrical and cinema actor. People's Artist of the USSR (1956). Winner of the Lenin (1959) and Stalin Prize (1947). Hero of Socialist Labour (1976).

His son, Andrei Tolubeyev, also became an actor.

== Partial filmography ==
- Sovershennoletiye (1935) - seaman Andrey
- Na otdykhe (1936) - Lebedev
- The Return of Maxim (1937) - Loudmouthed Worker in Natasha's Office
- Shakhtery (1937) - Vasiliy Ivanovich Chub
- Tayga zolotaya (1937)
- Doch rodiny (1937) - Chairman of the meeting
- Shakhtyory (1937)
- Professor Mamlock (1938) - Fritz
- The Vyborg Side (1939) - Yegor Bugai
- Doktor Kalyuzhnyy (1939)
- Patriot (1939) - Grigori Novikov
- The Girl from Leningrad (1941) - Maj. Braginsky
- Prints i nishchiy (1943) - Henry VIII of England
- The Turning Point (1945) - Lavrov
- Simple People (1945) - Yeryomin, works director
- Ostrov Bezymyannyy (1946) - Nikolay Krasinskiy
- Aleksandr Popov (1949) - Petrushevsky
- Konstantin Zaslonov (1949) - sekretar TsK KP Belorussii
- The Battle of Stalingrad (1949) - Andrey Aleksandrovich Zhdanov
- Velikaya sila (1950) - Abuladze
- The Inspector-General (1952) - Mayor Anton Antonovich Skvoznik-Dmukhanovsky
- Belinsky (1953) - Schepkin
- Chest tovarishcha (1953) - general Pashkov
- Les (1953)
- Unfinished Story (1955) - Nikolai Sladkov
- Don Quixote (1957) - Sancho Panza
- Den pervyy (1958) - Lomovoy izvoznik
- The Overcoat (1959) - Petrovich
- Gorizont (1962)
- Hamlet (1964) - Polonius
- Avariya (1965) - Anton Afanasyevich Pilipenko - sledovatel iz Gorskoy prokuratury
- His name was Robert (1967) - Inspector
- Chronicles of a Dive Bomber (1968) - Kuzmich, air mechanic
- Udar! Eshchyo udar! (1968) - Professor Vakhramov
- Interventsiya (1968)
- Nochnaya smena (1971) - Pavel Yegorovich Ponomaryov
- Property of the Republic (1972) - Prokofiy Dobrovo
- Pyataya chetvert (1972) - Kondrykov
- Mechenyy atom (1973) - Sergey Konstantinovich
- Front Beyond the Front Line (1978) - Professor Belyaev (final film role)

== Awards ==
- Stanislavsky State Prize of the RSFSR (1974)
