= The Devil's Wheel =

1926 film by Grigori Kozintsev and Leonid Trauberg

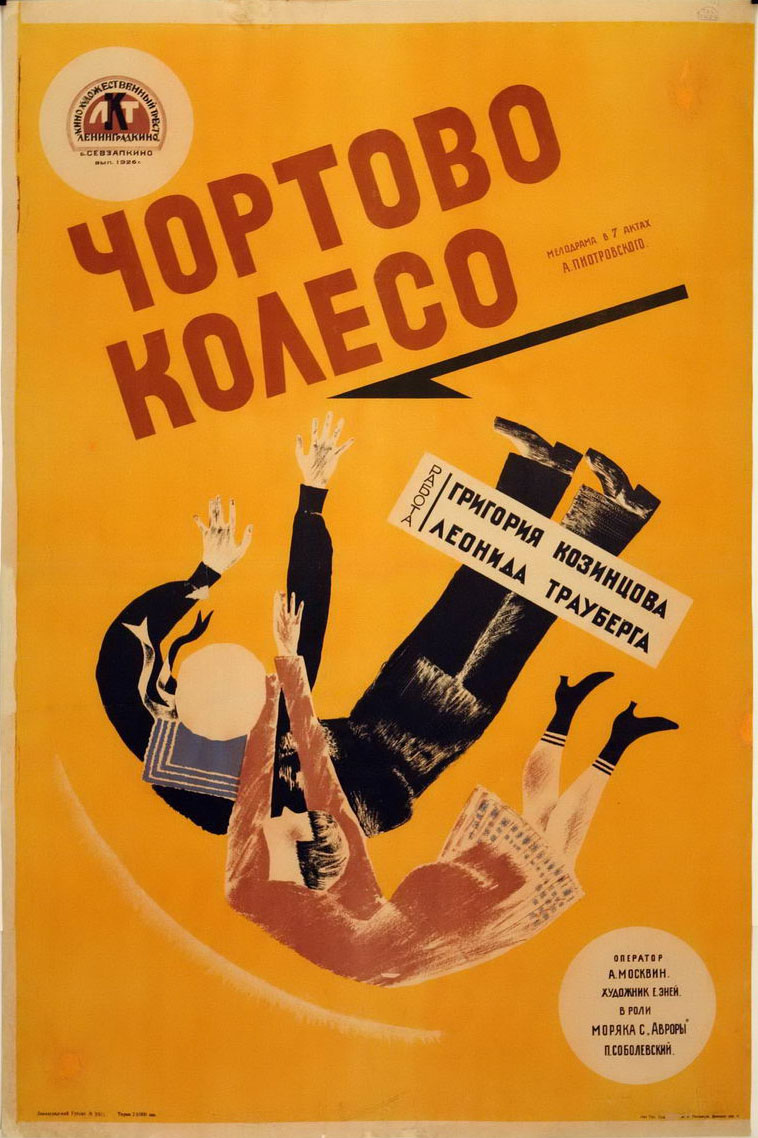
- Directed by: Grigori Kozintsev; Leonid Trauberg
- Written by: Adrian Piotrovsky; Veniamin Kaverin (story)
- Starring: Pyotr Sobolevsky; Sergei Gerasimov; Yanina Zhejmo; Sergey Martinson
- Cinematography: Andrei Moskvin
- Production company: Leningradkino
- Release date: 16 March 1926
- Running time: 2,650 meters (112 minutes)
- Country: Soviet Union
- Languages: Silent film Russian intertitles

The Devil's Wheel (Russian: Чёртово колесо, romanized: Chyortovo koleso) is a 1926 Soviet silent crime action film directed by Grigori Kozintsev and Leonid Trauberg.

== Plot ==
During a walk in the garden of the People's House, sailor Ivan Shorin meets Valya and, having missed the scheduled time is late for the ship which is departing for a cruise. The next morning he has to go to a distant foreign trek and his slight delay has turned into a desertion. The young people are sheltered by artists who turn out to be ordinary punks. Not wanting to become a thief, Ivan runs away and surrenders himself to the authorities. After the trial of his friends and just punishment, he returns to his former life.

== Cast ==
- Pyotr Sobolevsky – Ivan Shorin, sailor from the cruiser "Aurora"
- Lyudmila Semyonova – Valka, street girl
- Sergei Gerasimov – Magician "Human-Question", leader of the bandit gang
- Emil Gal – Entertainer Coco, "Question"'s friend
- Yanina Zhejmo – Girl from the gang
- Sergey Martinson – Orchestra conductor
- Andrei Kostrichkin – One of the inhabitants of the bandits' den
- Nikolai Gorodnichev – Punk "Superintendent"
- Antonio Tserep – Cellar owner
