= Three Friends and an Invention =

1927 film

- Russian: Два друга, модель и подруга
- Directed by: Aleksei Popov
- Written by: Mikhail Karostin; Aleksei Popov
- Starring: S. Lavrentyev; Aleksei Popov; Olga Tretyakova; Sergei Yablokov
- Cinematography: Alexander Grinberg; Gleb Troyanski
- Release date: 1927
- Country: Soviet Union

Three Friends and an Invention (Russian: Два друга, модель и подруга, romanized: Dva druga, model i podruga, lit. 'Two Friends a Model, and a Girlfriend') is a 1927 Soviet film directed by Aleksei Popov.

The film is a light-hearted satire about the misadventures of two friends who are young workers at a soap-making factory.

== Plot ==
Ahov and Mahov, young workers at a small soap factory, invent a machine capable of significantly accelerating the production of soap packaging. However, they face many hardships, including bureaucratic indifference from the factory's director, who shows no interest in either the inventors or the manufacturing process. Additionally, they are opposed by nepmen like Ardalion Medalionov, a private entrepreneur and packaging supplier who sees their invention as a threat to his business.

While the local Komsomol organization is ready to support the workers, a demonstration of the machine ends in failure due to Medalionov sabotaging it. Pursued by Medalionov and his accomplices, Ahov, Mahov, and Dasha—a fellow factory worker whom they frequently flirt with—set off with their machine on a makeshift raft to reach a district center. However, Medalionov has already slandered them as crazed inventors, leading local authorities to detain the trio in a port warehouse, labeling them dangerous lunatics.

With Dasha's help, they manage to escape but encounter the same bureaucratic resistance at the district level. Undeterred, they continue their journey, enduring numerous adventures aboard a steamboat. Finally, thanks to their alliance with the Komsomol, the friends achieve reasonable results in their inventive labor and pursuits when they reach the provincial capital, where their machine is at last recognized and appreciated.

== Production ==
From the book Memories and Reflections on Theater written by the film's director, Aleksei Popov:

I was sick at the thought of making a comedy. During this time, there was literally a cry, "There are no Soviet comedies, there are no films on the material of our Soviet life." Under the influence of these requirements and the many failures in the field of comedy, my desire to make a modern comedy film was born.

There was one more circumstance that directly pushed us on the path to the creation of a Soviet comedy. At this time, the American film Our Hospitality featuring Buster Keaton was released here to massive success. We very much liked the humor of this comedy. The first railroad was shown on screen with all the entertaining oddities of a journey. Besides Buster Keaton's talented performance, an atmosphere of the hilarity and absurdity of pre-industrial times came through well in the film.

This atmosphere encouraged us to make the film Three Friends and an Invention. We wanted to produce a film about modern people, who are active and cheerful, and in the background capture the fading elements of Russian provincial life, both absurd and yet charming in their own way. The main characters were young worker-inventors. In the struggle for their invention they had to make a great journey from the countryside to the district capital.

They took a steamboat (here I used funny episodes from our own travels on the river Unzha in the Kostroma province), and then rode on a makeshift raft along small rivers, walked on foot, while carrying their cumbersome invention on their back, and fought fiercely with the bureaucrats.

The newspaper Pravda then noted, "Until now, the hero of our comedies was an ill-fated figure, which being the center of comedic positions, was endowed primarily with negative traits. The hero usually portrayed a Nepman, a rascal, a swindler, etc. Two Friends, broke sharply from this erroneous tendency. Here, the funny inventor friends, on the same side as all of the sympathies of the author, entirely infect the viewers. Soviet comedy began to look for its hero."

In the film were the actors Sergei Yablokov from Kostroma Studio, Sergei Lavrentyev from the Theater of the Revolution, Olga Tretyakova, and others. The film saw quite large and prolonged success and, as they say, paved the road for a variety of Soviet comedies. The motion picture was repeatedly renewed and even shown in America.

A. D. Popov said that the idea was born in him, as a response to the comedy Ole & Axel, which was running successfully on Soviet screens. And really, it was easy to notice in the main role of the film – small, nimble Akhov and tall, ungainly Makhov – the features of their cinematic inspirations, Ole and Axel. Nevertheless, Popov's comedy was both very modern and genuinely accessible. It scathingly ridiculed bureaucracy, was full of cheerful humor in its portrayal of a far province, a quiet backwater corner, where one can begin a new life. Popov lovingly resurrected onscreen these quiet, lost places, fields of rye, flowing spring waters, and his scenic sketches of everyday episodes that were full of their own sharp and precise observations.

By some measure, this film could be considered the first Soviet road movie. The heroes make their way to the district center on a steam boat, then move onto a makeshift float, encountering the same bureaucratic obstacles everywhere.

== Cast ==
- Sergei Lavrentyev as Akhov
- Aleksei Popov
- Olga Tretyakova as Dasha
- Sergei Yablokov as Makhov
