= Belinsky (film) =

1953 film by Grigori Kozintsev

- Directed by: Grigori Kozintsev
- Written by: Grigori Kozintsev; Yury German
- Starring: Sergei Kurilov; Aleksandr Borisov; Georgy Vitsin; Yuri Lyubimov; Yuri Tolubeyev; Mikhail Nazvanov
- Cinematography: Andrei Moskvin; Sergei Ivanov; Mark Magidson
- Music by: Dmitri Shostakovich
- Production company: Lenfilm
- Release date: 4 June 1953
- Running time: 102 minutes
- Country: Soviet Union
- Language: Russian

Belinsky (Russian: Белинский) is a 1953 Soviet biopic film directed by Grigori Kozintsev, based on the life of Russian literary critic Vissarion Belinsky (1811–1848). The production of the film was completed in 1951 but it was not released until 1953, following the reshooting of various scenes demanded by Stalin.

== Plot ==
Vissarion Grigoryevich Belinsky—a Russian thinker, writer, literary critic, publicist, and Westernizer philosopher—lived a remarkable but brief life. Initially captivated by Hegelian philosophy, particularly its assertion that "all that is real is rational," Belinsky passionately embraced this idea. However, as he delved deeper into the realities around him, he became a fervent critic of their irrationality.

Belinsky argued that Russian literature did not truly exist until the works of Nikolai Gogol emerged. Nevertheless, he dedicated a series of articles to Russian writers in the journal Otechestvennye Zapiski (Notes of the Fatherland), which were later compiled into a separate volume. This collection effectively served as a history of Russian literature, spanning from Mikhail Lomonosov to Alexander Pushkin.

== Cast ==
- Sergei Kurilov as Vissarion Belinsky
- Aleksandr Borisov as Alexander Herzen
- Georgy Vitsin as Nikolai Gogol
- Yuri Lyubimov as Frolov
- Yuri Tolubeyev as Mikhail Shchepkin
- Vladimir Chestnokov as Nikolay Nekrasov
- Mikhail Nazvanov as Nicholas I
- Igor Gorbachyov as student
- Arkadi Trusov as sergeant
- Nikolay Simonov as landlord
- Olga Aroseva as actress
- Nikolay Trofimov as typographic worker
- Bruno Freindlich as Professor Shcheplovidov
