= Tamilla Agamirova =

Russian actress (1928–2021)

- Born: 21 May 1928; Baku, Azerbaijan SSR, Transcaucasian SFSR, Soviet Union
- Died: 31 August 2021 (aged 93); Nikolina Gora, Moscow, Russia
- Spouse: Nikolai Slichenko

Tamilla Sujaevna Agamirova (Russian: Тамилла Суджаевна Агамирова, 21 May 1928 – 31 August 2021) was a Soviet and Azerbaijani film and theatre actress, and the wife of the chief director of the Romen Theatre, Nikolai Slichenko.

== Biography ==
Agamirova was born in Baku in the Azerbaijan Soviet Socialist Republic in 1928 and graduated from the Baku Theater Institute, now known as the Azerbaijan State University of Culture and Arts, in 1951. Since 1952, she performed in the Romen Theater in more than 50 different roles in Russian and foreign performances. Her first role on stage at the Romen was in the play Stubborn Hearts, for which she was nominated for the Stalin Prize. Agamirova died on 31 August 2021 at the age of 93.

== Awards and honours ==
In 2019, she was awarded the Order of Honor for "a great contribution to the development of national culture and art".

== Partial filmography ==
- Don Quixote
- Matteo Falcone
