= The Young Fritz =

1943 film by Leonid Trauberg and Grigori Kozintsev

- Directed by: Grigori Kozintsev; Leonid Trauberg
- Written by: Samuil Marshak
- Starring: Mikhail Zharov
- Cinematography: Andrei Moskvin
- Music by: Lev Shvarts
- Production company: Lenfilm
- Release date: 1943
- Running time: 30 minutes
- Country: Soviet Union
- Language: Russian

The Young Fritz (Russian: Юный Фриц, romanized: Yunyi Frits) is a 1943 Soviet short film directed by Grigori Kozintsev and Leonid Trauberg based on a short satiric poem by Samuil Marshak.

== Plot ==
The film presents a satirical account of the upbringing of the "true Aryan," depicted as a lecture by Professor "Antrepalogy" (Maxim Shtraukh), who strikes with his pointer on skulls, showcasing exhibits of the "pure race." The illustrated biography of the young Fritz unfolds like a puppet show, where young Fritz (Mikhail Zharov), initially reduced to the size of a newborn, begins to grow in his cradle and eventually transforms into a huge brute, stomping across a map of Europe with his stormtrooper boots, conquering it entirely.

At the end of the film, Fritz is placed in a Soviet zoo because "for science, any beast is necessary."

== Cast ==
- Mikhail Zharov - Fritz
- Maksim Shtraukh - Examining professor
- Mikhail Astangov - Teacher
- Vsevolod Pudovkin - Officer
- Yanina Zhejmo
- Mikhail Vysotsky - Father
- Lydia Atmanaki - Mother
- Lyudmila Shabalina - Tour guide in Museum of the Future
- Konstantin Sorokin - Franz
