= The Boarder (1953 film) =

1953 film by Vladimir Basov

- Polish film poster
- Directed by: Vladimir Basov; Mstislav Korchagin
- Written by: Ivan Turgenev (play)
- Cinematography: Konstantin Brovin; Konstantin Petrichenko
- Music by: Mikhail Ziv
- Release date: 1953
- Running time: 100 minutes
- Country: Soviet Union
- Language: Russian

The Boarder (Russian: Нахлебник, romanized: Nakhlebnik) is a 1953 Soviet historical drama film directed by Vladimir Basov and Mstislav Korchagin and starring Boris Chirkov, Sergei Kurilov and Lidiya Dranovskaya. It is based upon the play Fortune's Fool (1848) by Ivan Turgenev.

== Synopsis ==
After years of absence from St. Petersburg comes Eletskaya (Lidiya Dranovskaya) to her estate together with her husband (Sergei Kurilov). The young couple are met by a poor nobleman Kuzovkin (Boris Chirkov), a boarder at the home of Eletskaya. Her husband and the surrounding landowners who are laden with boredom from the monotony of the provincial life, make fun of the old man, humiliating his personal dignity. Unable to withstand the bullying, Kuzovkin publicly declares that the woman of the house is his daughter. At the insistence of Eletskiy, the old man leaves the house of his daughter.

== Cast ==
- Boris Chirkov as Vasiliy Semonovich Kuzovkin (impoverished nobleman)
- Sergei Kurilov as Pavel Nikolaevich Eletskiy (St. Petersburg official)
- Lidiya Dranovskaya as Olga Petrovna Korina (wife of Eletskiy)
- Pavel Springfeld as Flegont Aleksandrovich Tropachev (neighbour, landowner)
- Sergey Komarov as Ivan Kuzmich Ivanov (Kuzovkin's friend)
- Aleksandra Denisova as Praskovya Ivanovna (matron)
- Georgiy Georgiu as Narciss Konstantinovich Trembinsky (butler)
- Stepan Krylov as Karpachev (neighbour of modest means)
- Rimma Shorokhova as Masha (maid)
- Vladimir Uralskiy as Egor Alekseich (administrator)
- Maria Vinogradova as Vaska (cossack)

== Bibliography ==
- Rollberg, Peter. Historical Dictionary of Russian and Soviet Cinema. Scarecrow Press, 2008.
