= The Return of Maxim =

1937 film by Grigori Kozintsev and Leonid Trauberg

- Bulgarian film poster
- Directed by: Grigori Kozintsev; Leonid Trauberg
- Written by: Grigori Kozintsev; Leonid Trauberg; Lev Slavin
- Starring: Boris Chirkov
- Cinematography: Andrei Moskvin
- Production company: Lenfilm
- Release date: May 23, 1937
- Running time: 3082 meters (112 minutes)
- Country: Soviet Union
- Language: Russian

The Return of Maxim

The Return of Maxim (Russian: Возвращение Максима) is a 1937 Soviet drama film directed by Grigori Kozintsev and Leonid Trauberg, the second part of trilogy about the life of a young factory worker, Maxim. It was preceded by The Youth of Maxim (1935).

The film continues the story of Maxim, who is now an idealistic revolutionary navigating political intrigue, labor strikes, and armed resistance in pre-World War I Russia, risking everything to ignite the spark of proletarian revolution. It was followed by The Vyborg Side (1939).

== Plot ==
The prologue reveals that Maxim, the protagonist of the first film in the trilogy, The Youth of Maxim, has become an experienced revolutionary. Twice arrested, he manages to escape custody both times.

The main story is set in 1914. In the lobby of the building where the Fourth State Duma of the Russian Empire is in session, various deputies from different social strata engage in dialogue, with many interactions portrayed satirically. Standing apart from the crowd is Turaev, a member of the Bolshevik faction of the Social Democrats, who meets with Natasha, a party courier operating under the alias "Comrade Elena." Together, they head to a working-class district in St. Petersburg for agitation efforts.

Maxim, now operating under the alias "Comrade Fyodor," leads a strike committee meeting disguised as a social gathering in a tavern. He firmly rejects attempts by Mensheviks to weaken the demands of striking workers. During the discussion, it is revealed that a military contract, which the strike aimed to disrupt, has been secretly transferred to another factory. The factory owners and an accountant named Platon Dymba—a drunken troublemaker and a skilled billiards player—are the only ones aware of the contract's location. Maxim gains Dymba’s trust and learns the order is now at the Northern Factory. The Bolsheviks organize a strike there, eventually mobilizing the entire St. Petersburg proletariat.

The workers erect barricades and engage in armed clashes with authorities. However, by late July 1914, the gendarme forces suppress the uprising. Seeking revenge, Dymba attacks Maxim and attempts to kill him.

On August 1, 1914, Russia enters World War I. The party sends Maxim to the front lines as a regular soldier, where he continues his revolutionary activities, conducting political agitation among the troops.

== Cast ==
- Boris Chirkov - Maksim
- Valentina Kibardina - Natasha
- Anatoli Kuznetsov - Worker's Deputy Turayev
- Aleksandr Zrazhevsky - Vassili Kuzmich Yerofeyev, worker
- Aleksandr Chistyakov - Mishchenko, white-wooly mustached worker
- Vasili Vanin - Nikolai
- Yuri Tolubeyev - Loudmouthed Worker in Natasha's Office
- Aleksandr Bondi - Menshevik Troublemaker
- Mikhail Zharov - Platon Vassilievich Dymba
- Nikolai Kryuchkov
- Vasili Merkuryev
- Mikheil Gelovani
- Stepan Kayukov
- Leonid Lyubashevsky
- Maksim Shtraukh
- Mikhail Tarkhanov
