= Simple People =

1945 film by Grigori Kozintsev and Leonid Trauberg

- Directed by: Grigori Kozintsev; Leonid Trauberg
- Written by: Grigori Kozintsev; Leonid Trauberg
- Starring: Yuri Tolubeyev
- Cinematography: Andrei Moskvin; Anatoli Nazarov
- Edited by: V. Mironova
- Music by: Dmitri Shostakovich
- Production company: Lenfilm
- Release date: 1956
- Running time: 2,147 meters (approx. 68 minutes)
- Country: Soviet Union
- Language: Russian

Simple People (Russian: Простые люди) is a 1945 Soviet war romance film directed by Grigori Kozintsev and Leonid Trauberg. The film, along with the second part of Eisenstein's Ivan the Terrible was harshly criticized by Andrei Zhdanov and banned. A version of the film, released in 1956 during Khrushchev Thaw, was disowned by Kozintsev because the reediting was done without his participation.

== Plot ==
As Nazi forces advance toward Leningrad, the last plane departs from an aviation factory's airfield, and the factory is slated for evacuation. Workers, including elderly men, women, and teenagers, journey across the country to distant Uzbekistan, while the skilled workforce fights on the front lines. Despite challenges, the factory is expected to begin producing planes within two months.

Upon arrival, the evacuees set up machinery under open skies and begin working, joined by thousands of new recruits, many grieving the loss of loved ones. The factory director, Yeremin, endures his own tragedy: his wife goes missing during the evacuation. Despite the personal blow, Yeremin tirelessly oversees every aspect of the factory's operations, ensuring progress. His resilience is rewarded when he reunites with his wife, who had suffered captivity and lost her health and memory during the German occupation.

Under the care of doctors, she recovers, and on the day the factory produces its first aircraft, she is discharged from the hospital. Together with Yeremin and the entire factory team, she shares the joy of this labor triumph.

== Cast ==
- Yuri Tolubeyev - Yeryemin
- Olga Lebzak - Yeryemina
- Boris Zhukovsky - Makeev
- F. Babadzhanov - Akbashev
- Yekaterina Korchagina-Aleksandrovskaya - grandmother
- I. Kudryavtseva - Varvara
- Larisa Yemelyantseva - Sasha
- Vladimir Kolchin - Ivanov
- Tatyana Pelttser - Plaksina
- Anatoli Chiryev - Romka
- Aleksandr Larikov - Kizlyakov
- Konstantin Adashevky - the cook
