= Vladimir Chestnokov =

Soviet actor (1904–1968)

- Владимир Честноков
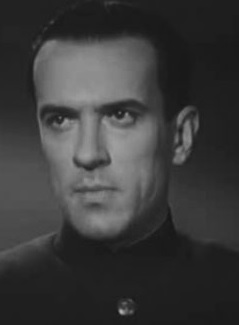
- Chestnokov in Fourth Рeriscope, 1939
- Born: April 12, 1904; Saint Petersburg, Russian Empire
- Died: May 15, 1968 (aged 64); Leningrad, Russian SFSR, Soviet Union
- Occupation(s): Film actor, stage actor, theater teacher
- Awards: People's Artist of the USSR (1960)

Vladimir Ivanovich Chestnokov (Note: Russian: Владимир Иванович Честноков, romanized: Vladimir Ivanovich Chestnokov) (April 12, 1904 [O.S. March 30] – May 15, 1968) was a Soviet film and theater actor, theater teacher. Chestnokov was born in Saint Petersburg. People's Artist of the USSR (1960). Winner of the Stalin Prize of the first degree (1950) and the USSR State Prize (1967). Member of the CPSU (b) since 1941. Chestnokov died in Leningrad in 1968.

== Filmography ==
- Professor Mamlock (1938) as Dr. Hellpach
- Fourth Рeriscope (1939) as Grigory Krainev, submarine commander
- The Defeat of Yudenich (1941) as Lyudenkvist
- Father and Son (1941) as Sergey
- Mittens (1942) as Fedya Dorozhkin (short)
- Marine Вattalion (1944) as commander
- Pirogov (1947) as Ipatov
- Alexander Popov (1949) as Lyuboslavsky
- Taras Shevchenko (1951) as Nikolay Chernyshevsky
- Belinsky (1953) as Nikolay Nekrasov
- The Gadfly (1955) as Domenichino
- His Тime will Сome (1958) as Fyodor Dostoevsky
- October Days (1958) as Vladimir Lenin
- I Love You, Life! (1960) as Topilin
- The Very First (1961) as Academician Andrey Arkadyev
- 713 Requests Permission to Land (1962) as Richard Gunther
- Executions at Dawn (1964) as Dmitri Mendeleev
- Green Сoach (1967) as Sosnitsky
- Pervorossiyane (1967) as Lenin
