= The Turning Point (1945 film) =

1945 film by Fridrikh Ermler

- Russian: Великий перелом
- Directed by: Fridrikh Ermler
- Written by: Boris Chirskov
- Starring: Mikhail Derzhavin, Sr; Pyotr Andriyevsky; Yuri Tolubeyev; Andrei Abrikosov
- Cinematography: Arkadi Koltsaty
- Production company: Lenfilm
- Release date: 1945
- Running time: 108 minutes
- Country: Soviet Union
- Language: Russian

The Turning Point (Russian: Великий перелом, romanized: Velikij perelom) is a 1945 Soviet, Russian-language World War II film directed by Fridrikh Ermler based on a screenplay by Boris Chirskov. The film was one of the earlier Palme d'Or winners of 1946. It was produced by GOSKINO at Kinostudiya Lenfilm (Lenfilm Studio), distributed in the US by Artkino Pictures, and restored in 1967 at Lenfilm Studio. The film's working title was General of the Army (Russian: Генерал армии).

== Plot ==
During the Great Patriotic War, German and fascist forces advance toward the Volga River. The Wehrmacht concentrates troops to seize a Russian city on the Volga's banks. The Soviet high command fears that the fall of the unnamed city (marked on maps as "Stalingrad") could have catastrophic consequences for the Eastern Front, provoking an attack on the USSR by Japan and other nations. General V. V. Vinogradov, commanding the front, suggests retreating to avoid disaster and save the army, but General Krivenko argues against it. The Supreme Command of the Soviet Armed Forces appoints General K. S. Muravyov to lead the front and orders: "The city must not be surrendered; prepare to defeat the German forces!" Muravyov prepares an active defence for the city and reunites with his wife, Liza, who also serves in the army.

Muravyov believes the key to victory is to buy time without depleting strategic reserves, exhausting the enemy before delivering a decisive blow. He feels his opponent, the German general von Klaus, has overestimated his strength and underestimated the Red Army. Muravyov reluctantly orders the evacuation of industrial enterprises to be halted because "an empty city will not be defended." General Vinogradov is reassigned as chief of staff. Heavy German attacks are constantly reinforced but Muravyov refuses to send soldiers or tanks from his own strategic reserves. The German forces are halted, but not before occupying significant portions of the city. Muravyov's wife dies in the fighting.

Muravyov replaces General Krivenko, who advocates for a flanking counterattack, with the cautious and strategic General Panteleev. An expert on fortifications, Panteleev believes the city’s defensive position offers significant advantages, depriving the enemy of their key asset: mobile tank units. He proposes measures for active defense. Muravyov stresses that the city must not be surrendered, urging the defense of every building on the western bank of the Volga, and predicts von Klaus will use his best divisions inside the city, creating an opportunity for Soviet forces to encircle the Germans.

Soviet intelligence reports the timing of the German final assault, and Muravyov plans a concentrated artillery strike to weaken the approaching German forces. When a barrage of artillery strikes the German concentrations on time, the Soviets anxiously await their decision: will the Germans proceed with the attack or delay? Muravyov’s plan proves correct as despite heavy losses, von Klaus launches his offensive, triggering the Soviet counterattack.

Soviet forces, bolstered by strategic and front-line reserves, push the Germans back with a counteroffensive. Muravyov successfully executes the Supreme Command's plan, trapping and destroying the enemy forces. Von Klaus and his staff are captured, but Muravyov refuses to engage with him, stating, "Now, it’s Manstein who interests me." He emphasizes this victory is only part of a greater offensive, with the new objective being "To the west, to Berlin."

== Cast ==
- Mikhail Derzhavin, Sr as Col. Gen. Muravyev
- Petr Andrievsky as Col. Gen. Vinogradov
- Yuri Tolubeyev as Lavrov
- Andrei Abrikosov as Lt. Gen. Krivenko
- Aleksandr Zrazhevsky as Lt. Gen. Panteleev
- Nikolay Korn
- Mark Bernes as Minutka Driver
- Vladimir Marev
- Pavel Volkov as Stepan
