= The Overcoat (1926 film) =

1926 film by Grigori Kozintsev

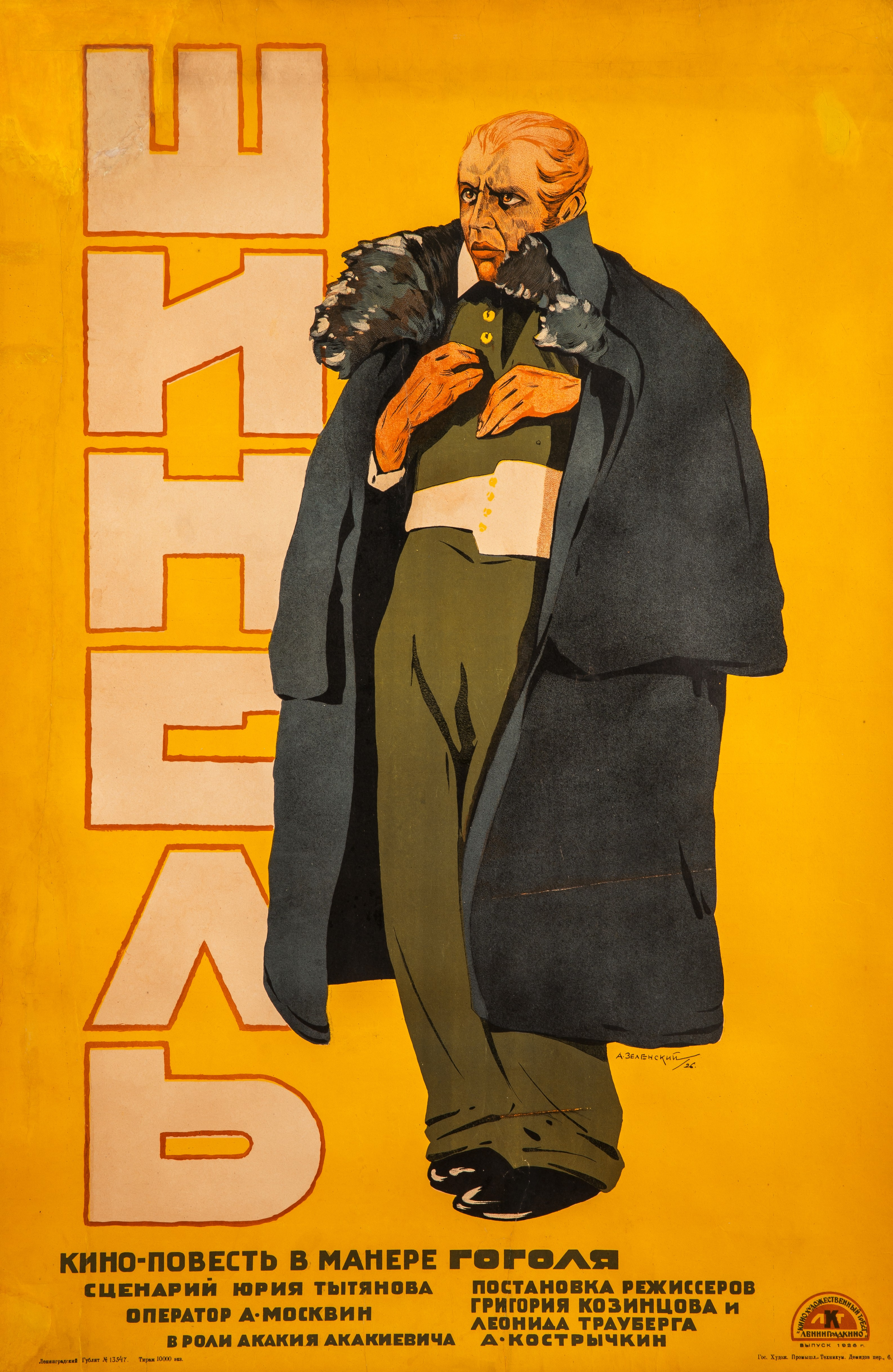
- Directed by: Grigori Kozintsev; Leonid Trauberg
- Written by: Yury Tynyanov; Nikolai Gogol
- Starring: Andrei Kostrichkin; Aleksei Kapler; Boris Shpis; Pyotr Sobolevsky; Yanina Zhejmo
- Cinematography: Yevgeni Mikhailov; Andrei Moskvin
- Production company: Lenfilm
- Release date: 1926
- Running time: 65 minutes
- Country: Soviet Union
- Language: Silent film (Russian intertitles)

The Overcoat (Russian: Шинель, romanized: Shinel) is a 1926 Soviet drama film directed by Grigori Kozintsev and Leonid Trauberg, based on the Nikolai Gogol stories "Nevsky Prospekt" and "The Overcoat".

Charlie Chaplin was invited to play the lead role, but as an alien resident in the United States, was threatened by US government officials with being refused entry back into the country if he made the film and it contained Soviet propaganda.

== Plot ==
Arriving in St. Petersburg, landowner Ptitsin (Nikolai Gorodnichev) tries to achieve with the help of bribes a favorable decision of his litigation concerning a neighbor. With swindler and blackmailer Yaryzhka (Sergei Gerasimov) he finds a functionary who is willing to take the money. Cautious Bashmachkin (Andrei Kostrichkin) to whom the briber comes, does not want to take on the dangerous enterprise, although he can not resist the charms of a beautiful female stranger (Antonina Eremeeva) whom he met on the Nevsky Prospekt. Later Akaky Akakievich finds out that the woman of his dreams is only an accomplice to swindlers. Fearing punishment, the frightened bureaucrat becomes even more reclusive, all the more carefully isolating himself off from people.

Years later, the already aged and decrepit titular counselor Bashmachkin is forced at the cost of enormous efforts, down to saving the last penny to order a new custom overcoat from tailor Petrovich (Vladimir Lepko). It represents for him so much that it is impossible for him not to fall in love with the tailor's creation. The old campaigner literally becomes rejuvenated when he tries on the new clothing with a warm fur collar. Fellow officers have arranged a little party in honor of the colleague, but that night poor Bashmachkin is robbed on his way home from the festivities. He tries to complain and goes with his trouble to the authorities. Nobody wants to listen to him and he is kicked out, and some time later heartbroken Akakiy dies peacefully, a senseless death ending a meaningless life.

== Cast ==
- Andrei Kostrichkin as Akakiy Akakievich Baschmachkin
- Antonina Eremeeva as girl, "heavenly creation"
- Aleksei Kapler as "insignificant man" / "significant man"
- Emil Gal as tailor
- Sergei Gerasimov as Yaryzhka, swindler-blackmailer
- Oleg Zhakov as Baschmachkin's colleague
- Yanina Zhejmo as tailor's assistant
- Vladimir Lepko as tailor Petrovich
- Pavel Berezin as functionary
- Tatiana Ventzel as barber
- Pyotr Sobolevsky as functionary
- Ksenia Denisova as Agrafena
- Nikolai Gorodnichev as Pyotr Petrovich Ptitsin
- Boris Shpis

== Reception ==
In An Outline of the History of Soviet Cinema, film historian Nikolai Lebedev described the film as a "grotesque" adaptation of Gogol's humanistic novella. Lebedev drew attention to "the actors' whimsical, fantastical performances, the surreal sets, the contrasting juxtapositions of dream and reality, the mystical-romantic lighting, and the grotesque framing of shots", which he said used cinematic means to "play with reality". He also wrote that the complexity of form in the film "had been taken to its logical extreme: at times, the viewer couldn't make out what was happening on screen." The Russian Guild of Film Critics placed The Overcoat in its list of the 100 best films in the history of Russian cinema.
