= Alone (1931 Soviet film) =

1931 film

- Directed by: Grigori Kozintsev; Leonid Trauberg
- Written by: Grigori Kozintsev; Leonid Trauberg
- Starring: Yelena Kuzmina; Pyotr Sobolevsky; Sergei Gerasimov; Maria Babanova
- Cinematography: Andrei Moskvin
- Music by: Dmitri Shostakovich
- Production company: Soyuzkino
- Release date: 10 October 1931 (Soviet Union)
- Running time: 80 minutes
- Country: Soviet Union
- Language: Russian

Yelena Kuzmina is both the star and the main character of the film.

Alone (Russian: Одна, romanized: Odna, meaning "Alone") is a Soviet film released in 1931. It was written and directed by Grigori Kozintsev and Leonid Trauberg. It was originally planned as a silent film, but it was eventually released with a soundtrack comprising sound effects, some dialogue (recorded after the filming) and a full orchestral score by Dmitri Shostakovich. The film, about a young teacher sent to work in Siberia, is in a realist mode and addresses three political topics then current: education, technology, and the elimination of the kulaks.

== Plot ==
The film tells the story of a newly graduated Leningrad teacher, Yelena Kuzmina. She goes furniture shopping with her fiance, Petya, and in a fantasy sequence she imagines teaching a class of neat, obedient city schoolchildren. Instead, she is assigned to work in the Altai Mountains of Siberia. Reluctant to leave, she appeals to remain in the city. Although her request is granted (by a faceless Nadezhda Krupskaya, seen only from behind), she is eventually spurred by the government's condemnation of 'cowards' such as her to accept the post.

Yelena arrives in a remote village, where the two authority figures are the feckless representative of the Soviet and the Bey — the local version of the kulak. The villagers live a primitive life, practicing shamanist religion (symbolised by the totem of a dead horse on a pole) and living entirely off their herd of sheep. The children become devoted to Yelena, but their education is hampered both by their primitive condition and by the insistence of the Bey that they work as shepherds rather than attending school. The representative of the Soviet refuses to help Yelena against the Bey; although he has received posters calling on people to expel the kulaks from the collective farms, his only comment is that the posters "look pretty".

Undaunted, Yelena takes her lessons to the children working with the sheep. The Bey, however, has illegally sold the sheep to some sheep traders, who begin to slaughter the animals. Yelena declares that she will travel to the regional centre to find out about Soviet regulations concerning dealings in sheep, but on the way she is thrown off a sled by one of the sheep traders and becomes lost in a snowstorm.

Yelena is found just in time by a rescue party from the village. They overthrow the representative of the Soviet and summon help for Yelena, who needs an emergency operation in order to survive. Telegraph messages to and from the capital result in an aeroplane being sent to rescue Yelena, who promises that she will soon return. The final shot of the film shows the aeroplane soaring above the totemic dead horse.

== Cast ==
- Yelena Kuzmina as teacher Yelena Kuzmina
- Pyotr Sobolevsky as Kuzmina's fiancé
- Sergei Gerasimov as local council chairman
- Maria Babanova as chairman's wife
- Liu-Sian Van as kulak
- Yanina Zhejmo as young teacher
- Boris Chirkov as voice on the phone

== History ==
The totem of a dead horse is used to represent the primitive condition of the villagers.

Shaman instead of a medicine and hard labor in the Altai village, 1930s, fragment of the film

Alone was one of many films produced by the partnership between Grigori Kozintsev and Leonid Trauberg, which began in the mid-1920s and continued until Trauberg was denounced in the anti-Semitic purge of 1948. Their previous film, The New Babylon, had been subject to censorship in 1929.

Production of Alone began in the same year, but under the first five-year plan the political content of films was now more tightly prescribed. The film therefore set out to address three key areas of political concern: the promotion of education, the elimination of the kulaks, and the introduction of advanced technology. Another key element was realism, which comes through in the use of the actress's real name for the main character, and in the ethnographic detail with which the lives of the villagers is depicted. The plot was inspired in part by two newspaper stories about teachers in peril: one who committed suicide, and one who was airlifted to safety.

Altai nature and sounds of vargan, fragment of the film

The film was shot on location in Leningrad and, over a period of seven months, in the Altai Mountains of Kazakhstan. It was originally planned as a silent film, but it was eventually decided to add a sound track to accompany it. This included sound effects and some dialogue (recorded after shooting, although the film mainly used written intertitles to show speech), but the main part was a full orchestral score in over 60 numbers by the young composer Dmitri Shostakovich, his opus 26. Shostakovich had also worked with the directors and writers on The New Babylon, as well as spending several years as a cinema pianist. His score includes parts for a throat-singer and for a theremin, which appears in the section depicting Yelena lost in the snowstorm, as well as a musical depiction of the aeroplane's engine, played by three tubas. He later re-used the music from the finale in the opening of his ballet The Limpid Stream (Op. 39).

The film was premiered on 10 October 1931 at the Splendid Palace in Leningrad. It was extremely popular, and was shown abroad as well as across Russia. As was usual for the time, it ran in cinemas for several years, but as with The New Babylon it again fell foul of tightening political controls. Although some of the more sarcastic elements of Shostakovich's score had been removed before release, the authorities had not censored the ironic use of the song How happy our days shall be! when Yelena realises her solitude. The figure of the lazy party boss was also a prime example of 'cultural pessimism', while the darkness and dramatism of the film provoked severe criticism in the mid-1930s, and it was eventually withdrawn from circulation.

The sixth of the film's seven reels (showing the kidnap and attempted murder of Yelena) was destroyed in the Siege of Leningrad, along with parts of Shostakovich's score. The film was revived for a showing in The Hague in 1984, while for a 2003 live performance in Den Bosch the missing music was reconstructed by Mark Fitz-Gerald from a surviving copy of the soundtrack. Similar performances have since taken place in France, Switzerland, Germany and the UK. A recording of music from the film was made in 1995, by the Byelorussian Radio and TV Symphony Orchestra under Walter Mnatsakanov.

Early in 2008 the Naxos label released a recording of part studio and part live performances made in late 2006, and including two tracks that had not been used in the film.
