= Sniper (1931 film) =

1931 film

- Russian: Снайпер
- Directed by: Semyon Timoshenko
- Written by: Semyon Timoshenko
- Starring: Boris Shlikhting; Pyotr Sobolevsky; Vladimir Gardin; Emil Gal
- Cinematography: V. Donashevsky
- Release date: 1931
- Country: Soviet Union
- Language: Russian

Sniper (Russian: Снайпер) is a 1931 Soviet war drama film directed and written by Semyon Timoshenko.

== Plot ==
The film begins during the First World War. A former metallurgist goes to France as part of the Russian Expeditionary Force and there he kills a German sniper. Examining the documents of the sniper, he learns that the dead man also worked at a metallurgical plant, as a result of which he comes to the idea of the need for solidarity between the workers. After the war, returning to his homeland - to Russia, where he is employed by a brigade leader at the depot at the railway border station. Suddenly a group of bandits attacked the station. Defending himself and the station, the protagonist destroys the leader of the gang, who turns out to be his former commander.

== Cast ==
- Boris Shlikhting as The Captain
- Pyotr Sobolevsky as The Soldier
- Pyotr Kirillov as German Sniper
- Vladimir Gardin as Colonel
- Emil Gal as French officer
- Pyotr Pirogov as Worker
- Leonid Kmit as Worker Viktor
