= Maria Tenazi =

Armenian actress (1903–1930)

- Մարիա Թադևոսյան
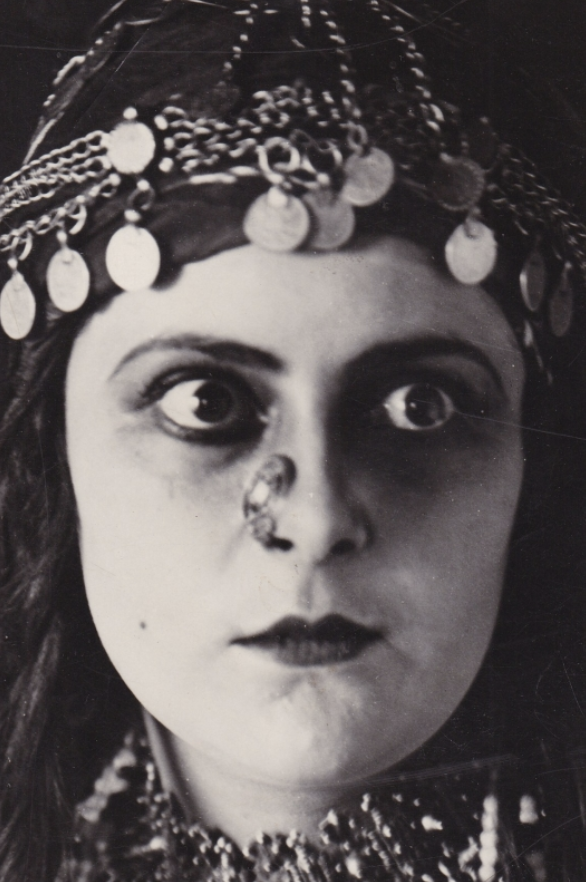
- Born: Mariya Aleksandrovna Tadevosyan; May 1, 1903; Baku, Russian Empire (now Azerbaijan)
- Died: May 1, 1930; Kobuleti, Adjara, Georgian Soviet Socialist Republic (now Georgia)
- Other names: Maria Tadevosyan, Maria Alexander Tadjosyan, Mariya Tadevosyan
- Education: N. Petrashevskaya Trade School
- Occupation: Actress
- Years active: 1924–1930

Maria Tenazi (née Mariya Aleksandrovna Tadevosyan; 1903–1930) (Armenian: Մարիա Թադևոսյան; Russian: Мария Александровна Тадевосян) was a Soviet Armenian silent film actress. She was the star of film Zare (1926), the first Armenian film dedicated to Kurdish culture.

== Biography ==
Mariya Aleksandrovna Tadevosyan was born on May 1, 1903, in Baku, Russian Empire (now Azerbaijan). She attended the N. Petrashevskaya Trade School in Tbilisi, where she studied painting.

Russian film director Vladimir Barsky was traveling and looking for scenic landscapes for Iron Hard Labor, a film about the fight of Georgian laborers for their rights before Russian Revolution in 1917. He was traveling between the small town of Alaverdi and Tbilisi, and on his journey he noticed Tenazi working at a copper foundry. In 1924, director Barsky hired her to act in Iron Hard Labor, her first film, which starred Mikheil Chiaureli and Akaki Khorava.

In 1925, Tenazi was given the starring role in the Barsky film The Secret of the Lighthouse. Her final film was Shelter of Clouds, she became sick while filming. She died of tuberculosis on her birthday, May 1, 1930, in Kobuleti, Georgian Soviet Socialist Republic (now Georgia), at the age of 27.

== Filmography ==
- 1924 – Iron Hard Labor (Russian: Железная каторга)
- 1924 – The Railway
- 1925 – The Secret of the Lighthouse (Russian: Тайна маяка), as Aishe, the daughter
- 1926 – Zare (Armenian: Զարե)
- 1926 – The Ninth Wave
- 1927 – In the Quagmire (Russian: В трясине, romanized: Gaplangva) as Marusya
- 1927 – Shelter of Clouds (Russian: Навстречу жизни)

== See also ==
- List of Armenian films of the 1920s
