= Somebody Else's Coat =

1927 film

- Directed by: Boris Shpis
- Written by: Veniamin Kaverin (story)
- Starring: Andrei Kostrichkin; Sergei Gerasimov; Pyotr Sobolevsky; Yanina Zhejmo; Tamara Makarova
- Cinematography: Andrei Moskvin; Ivan Tikhomirov
- Production company: Lensovkino
- Release date: 1927
- Running time: 63 minutes
- Country: Soviet Union
- Language: Silent film (Russian intertitles)

Somebody Else's Coat (Russian: Чужой пиджак, romanized: Chuzhoy pidzhak) is a 1927 Soviet comedy film directed by Boris Shpis, based on Veniamin Kaverin's short story "Government Inspector".

== Cast ==
- Andrei Kostrichkin - Chuchugin
- Sergei Gerasimov - Skalkovsky
- Pyotr Sobolevsky - Galaev
- Yanina Zhejmo - Gulka
- Tamara Makarova - Dudkina
