= The Youth of Maxim =

1935 film by Grigori Kozintsev and Leonid Trauberg

- Film poster
- Directed by: Grigori Kozintsev; Leonid Trauberg
- Written by: Grigori Kozintsev; Leonid Trauberg
- Starring: Boris Chirkov
- Cinematography: Andrei Moskvin
- Production company: Lenfilm
- Release date: 27 January 1935
- Running time: (98 minutes)
- Country: Soviet Union
- Language: Russian

The Youth of Maxim

The Youth of Maxim (Russian: Юность Максима) is a 1935 Soviet historical drama film directed by Grigori Kozintsev and Leonid Trauberg, the first part of trilogy about the life of a young factory worker named Maxim. It was followed in 1937 by The Return of Maxim.

== Plot ==
On New Year’s Eve of 1910, St. Petersburg's aristocracy and middle class celebrate the dawn of a new decade, while the revolutionary underground continues its struggle. Among them is the aging revolutionary "Polivanov," also known as "Sedoy," who moves between clandestine locations, encountering a mix of loyalty, cowardice, and outright betrayal. Despite being under surveillance, he manages to evade the authorities and continue his work.

By spring, three comrades from the working-class Narva District—Maxim, Dema, and Andrei—rescue an underground activist, Natasha, from a police informant. That same day, Andrei dies from injuries sustained on a faulty factory machine. Distraught, Dema turns to alcohol, while Maxim grows closer to the revolutionary proletariat. When another young worker dies in the factory, his funeral transforms into an impromptu demonstration. Maxim and Natasha call for a strike, but the police quickly suppress the disorganized workers. Amid the chaos, Dema kills a police officer while trying to defend Maxim. All three are arrested, and in prison, Maxim shares a cell with Sedoy. One night, they hear Dema being taken to his execution, shouting his goodbyes to his comrades. The prisoners respond by singing the revolutionary anthem, "Warszawianka."

Later, Maxim is released but is forbidden from living in most European provinces of the Russian Empire (a scene missing in many versions of the film). He throws himself into underground work, helping organize a secret workers' conference in a nearby forest. At the meeting, Sedoy reads an address from Vladimir Lenin. However, the gathering is disrupted by police, and everyone is arrested. Maxim narrowly escapes with the help of a train crew, hiding in a coal tender. Together with Natasha, he writes and distributes a passionate proclamation calling for continued resistance. Tasked by the Russian Social Democratic Labour Party (RSDLP), Maxim adopts the alias Pavel Agafonovich Malakhanov and heads to Nizhny Novgorod to support the struggle of the Sormovo workers.

== Cast ==
- Boris Chirkov - Maksim
- Valentina Kibardina - Natasha
- Mikhail Tarkhanov - Polivanov
- Stepan Kayukov - Dmitri "Dyema" Savchenko
- Aleksandr Kulakov - Andrei
- Boris Blinov
- S. Leontyev
- M. Shelkovsky
- Vladimir Sladkopevtsev
- Leonid Lyubashevky
- Pavel Volkov - The workman with the accordion (uncredited)
