= Little Brother (1927 film) =

1927 film

- Directed by: Grigori Kozintsev; Leonid Trauberg
- Written by: Grigori Kozintsev; Leonid Trauberg
- Starring: Pyotr Sobolevsky; Sergei Gerasimov; Yanina Zhejmo; Sergey Martinson
- Cinematography: Andrei Moskvin
- Production company: Sovkino
- Release date: 30 April 1927
- Running time: 1,584 meters (67 minutes)
- Country: Soviet Union
- Languages: Silent film Russian intertitles

Little Brother (Russian: Братишка, romanized: Bratishka) is a 1927 Soviet silent comedy film directed by Grigori Kozintsev and Leonid Trauberg. The film is believed to be lost.

== Plot ==
A driver of an old truck is convinced that his vehicle, "Bratishka," (Little Brother) still has many miles left to drive. However, the company director, wanting to save the business from unnecessary problems, sells the truck for a low price. The former driver of "Bratishka" decides to quit his job and join the new owner of the vehicle.

== Cast ==
- Pyotr Sobolevsky as Driver
- Sergei Gerasimov as Second driver
- Yanina Zhejmo as Girl
- Emil Gal as Port worker
- Tatyana Guretskaya as Conductor
- Sergey Martinson as Trust director
- Andrei Kostrichkin as Second trust director
