= Forty Hearts =

1931 film

- Russian: Сорок сердец
- Directed by: Lev Kuleshov
- Written by: Aleksandr Andriyevsky
- Cinematography: Konstantin Kuznetsov
- Release date: 1931
- Country: Soviet Union
- Language: Russian

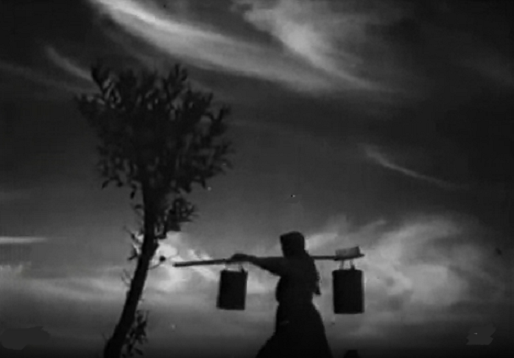
Scene from the movie "Forty Hearts"

Forty Hearts (Russian: Сорок сердец) is a 1931 Soviet drama film directed by Lev Kuleshov.

== Plot ==
The film tells about forty district power stations under construction, which are expected to give energy to the Soviet Union.
