= In the Quagmire =

1927 film

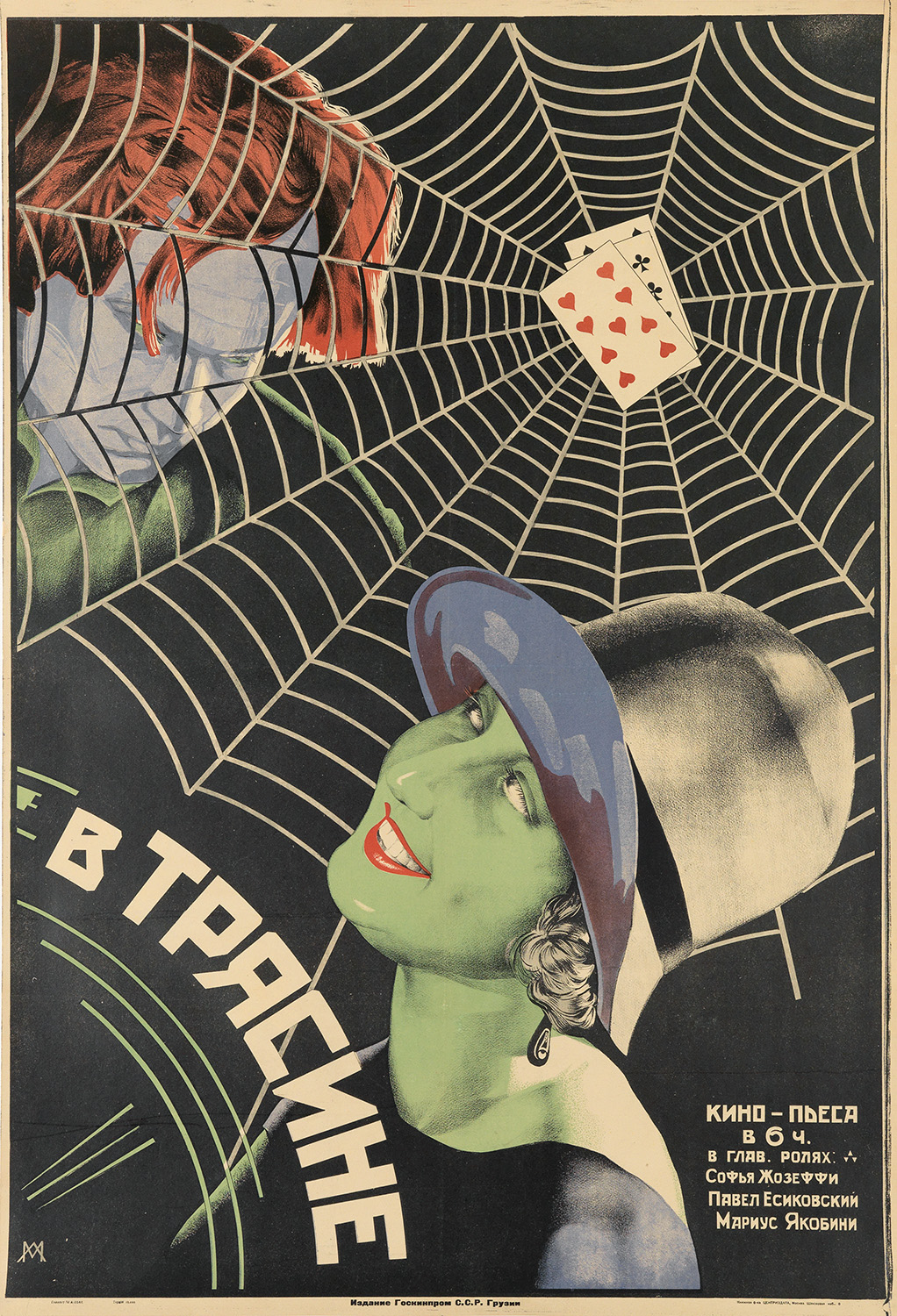
- В трясине
- Directed by: Ivane Perestiani
- Written by: Sergo Kldiashvili; Nikoloz Shengelaia
- Cinematography: Aleksandre Digmelovi
- Production company: Sakhkinmretsvi
- Release date: 1927
- Running time: 70 minutes
- Countries: Georgian Soviet Socialist Republic; Soviet Union
- Languages: Silent; Georgian intertitles

In the Quagmire (Russian: В трясине, romanized: Gaplangva) is a 1927 Georgian Soviet Socialist Republic silent film directed by Ivane Perestiani.

== Plot ==
Vasily is an aspiring writer and Apollon works as a bank teller. They spend all their free time in the casino, and gambling starts to feel like an addiction. Apollon uses his government money for bets and ended up in prison. Vasily grieves the loss of his friend.

== Cast ==
- Pavel Yesikovsky as Apollon Kazachkov
- Piotr Morskoy as Vasily Reztsov
- Maria Tenazi as Marusya
- Ivan Kruchinin as Grandpa of Marusya
- L. Privalov as Vasil Safonov
- Marius Jakobini
- Sofia Jozeffi
- K. Lavretski

== Bibliography ==
- Rollberg, Peter. Historical Dictionary of Russian and Soviet Cinema. Scarecrow Press, 2008.
