= Don Quixote (1957 film) =

1957 film by Grigori Kozintsev

- 1957 film poster by Vladimir Kononov
- Directed by: Grigori Kozintsev
- Written by: Evgeny Schwartz
- Starring: Nikolay Cherkasov; Yuri Tolubeyev
- Music by: Gara Garayev
- Distributed by: Lenfilm
- Release date: 15 October 1957
- Running time: 110 minutes
- Country: Soviet Union
- Language: Russian

Don Quixote (Russian: Дон Кихот, translit. Don Kikhot) is a 1957 Soviet drama film directed by Grigori Kozintsev. It is based on Evgeny Schwartz's stage adaptation of Miguel de Cervantes's novel of the same name. It was entered into the 1957 Cannes Film Festival.

The film was exhibited in the mid-1960s by Australian University film clubs receiving the productions of Sovexportfilm. It was the first film version of Don Quixote to be filmed in both widescreen and color.

== Plot ==
Hidalgo Alonso Quixano, deeply enamored with chivalric romances, decides to become a knight himself and embarks on a journey of adventure. Taking the name Don Quixote, he sets out with his loyal squire, Sancho Panza, to perform heroic deeds in defense of the downtrodden and in honor of his imagined lady love.

However, his noble quests often turn into absurd and futile endeavors. Though mocked and frequently beaten by those he encounters, Don Quixote remains steadfast in his belief in justice and the inherent goodness of humanity.

== Cast ==
- Nikolay Cherkasov as Don Quixote de la Mancha / Alonso Quixano
- Yuri Tolubeyev as Sancho Panza
- Serafima Birman as The Housekeeper
- Lyudmila Kasyanova as Aldonsa
- Svetlana Grigoryeva as The Niece
- Vasily Maksimov as The Priest
- Viktor Kolpakov as The Barber
- Tamilla Agamirova as Lady Altisidora
- Georgy Vitsin as Sanson Carrasco
- Bruno Freindlich as The Duke
- Lidiya Vertinskaya as The Duchess
- Galina Volchek as Maritornes
