= Andrei Kostrichkin =

Soviet actor (1901–1973)

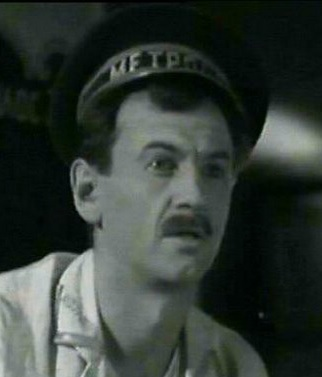
- Born: Andrei Aleksandrovich Kostrichkin; 24 August 1901; St. Petersburg, Russian Empire (now Russia)
- Died: 28 February 1973 (aged 71); Leningrad, Soviet Union (now Russia)
- Occupation: Actor
- Years active: 1925–1971

Andrei Aleksandrovich Kostrichkin (Russian: Андрей Александрович Костричкин; 24 August 1901 – 28 February 1973) was a Soviet actor. He appeared in more than 50 films between 1925 and 1971.

Honored Artist of the RSFSR (1935).

Wife actress Yanina Zhejmo. Kostrichkin's daughter Yanina works on duplicating films.

== Selected filmography ==
- Mishki versus Yudenich (1925)
- The Devil's Wheel (1926)
- The Overcoat (1926)
- The Club of the Big Deed (1927)
- Little Brother (1927)
- Somebody Else's Coat (1927)
- The New Babylon (1929)
- The Black Sail (1929)
- Our Girls (1930)
- Twenty Two Misfortunes (1930)
- Cities and Years (1930)
- Dead Soul (1930)
- Alone (1931)
- A Man from Prison (1931)
- The Fugitive (1932)
- Three Soldiers (1932)
- Conquerors of the Night (1933)
- The First Platoon (1933)
- Lieutenant Kijé (1934)
- Annenkovshina (1934)
- Ian Knuck's Wedding (1935)
- Treasure of the Sunken Ship (1935)
- Late for a Date (1936)
- Conduit (1936)
- Nightingale (1936)
- Zangezur (1938)
- David Guramishvili (1945)
- Train Departs at 10 (1947)
- Pirogov (1947)
- Tracks in the Snow (1955)
- Other People's Relatives (1955)
- Bonfire of Eternity (1956)
- Road of Truth (1956)
- Danika O'Connor (1956)
- Stepan Kolchugin (1957)
- The Storm (1957)
- Unpaid Debt (1959)
- Two Lives (1961)
- Devil's Dozen (1961)
- Executed at Dawn (1964)
- Three Fat Men (1966)
- The Snow Queen (1966)
- Sing Song, Poet (1973)
