= The Whirlpool (1927 film) =

1927 film

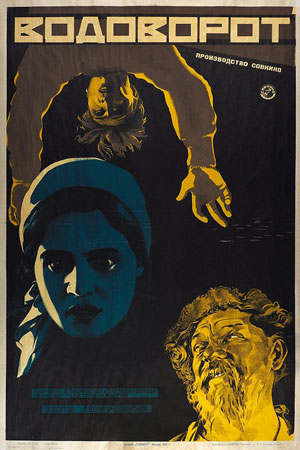
- Directed by: Pavel Petrov-Bytov
- Written by: Pavel Petrov-Bytov; Olga Vishnevskaya
- Starring: Tatyana Guretskaya; F. Mikhajlov
- Cinematography: Fridrikh Verigo-Darovsky
- Production company: Sovkino
- Release date: 1927
- Country: Soviet Union
- Languages: Silent; Russian intertitles

The Whirlpool (Russian: Водоворот, romanized: Vodovorot) is a 1927 Soviet silent film directed by Pavel Petrov-Bytov.

== Plot summary ==
The film tells the story of a young woman named Helga, played by Dorothy Sebastian, who lives in a small fishing village in Norway. Helga is engaged to Olaf, a local fisherman, and their relationship is seemingly idyllic.

However, their peaceful lives are disrupted when Helga encounters a charismatic and wealthy artist named Anatol, portrayed by Ben Lyon. Anatol seduces Helga, and she becomes infatuated with him, ultimately breaking off her engagement with Olaf.

As Helga falls deeper into Anatol's web, she becomes entangled in a whirlpool of deceit, manipulation, and emotional turmoil. Anatol's true nature is revealed, and Helga discovers the dark side of their relationship. She realizes that she has been manipulated and used by Anatol for his own gain.

Struggling to break free from the destructive whirlpool of emotions, Helga must confront her choices and make difficult decisions. The film explores themes of love, betrayal, and the consequences of one's actions.

== Cast ==
- Tatyana Guretskaya
- F. Mikhajlov

== Bibliography ==
- Christie, Ian & Taylor, Richard. The Film Factory: Russian and Soviet Cinema in Documents 1896-1939. Routledge, 2012.
