= Aleksey Popov (director) =

Russian actor and film director (1892-1961)

Aleksey Dmitrievich Popov (Алексей Дмитриевич Попов; 1891-1961) was a leading Soviet theatre director who managed the Soviet Army Theatre between 1935 and 1960. He was awarded three Stalin Prizes and was named a People's Artist of the USSR in 1946. His son Andrei was also a notable actor.

Popov made his directorial debut in 1923 at Vakhtangov's studio and gained wide recognition as the chief director of the Revolution Theatre in 1931-35. After moving to the Red Army Theatre in 1935, Popov "perfected the bombastic style of the battle drama on the enormous firing range of a stage". Popov's theatre became known for monumental war-themed productions with expressionistic touches.

Popov was appointed Dean of the GITIS theatre academy shortly before his death. He authored several lengthy theoretical works and a book of memoirs. His disciples include Georgy Tovstonogov, Anatoly Efros and Leonid Kheifets.

== Awards ==
- Stalin Prize first degree (1943)
- Stalin Prize second degree (1950)
- Stalin Prize second degree (1951)
- People's Artist of the USSR (1948)
