= The Club of the Big Deed =

1927 film by Grigori Kozintsev and Leonid Trauberg

- Directed by: Grigori Kozintsev; Leonid Trauberg
- Written by: Yury Tynyanov; Yulian Oksman
- Starring: Sergei Gerasimov; Andrei Kostrichkin; Pyotr Sobolevsky; Oleg Zhakov; Yanina Zhejmo
- Cinematography: Andrei Moskvin
- Production company: Sovkino
- Release date: 23 August 1927
- Running time: 2,100 meters (76 minutes)
- Country: Soviet Union
- Languages: Silent film Russian intertitles

Full film in Russian

The Club of the Big Deed or The Union of a Great Cause (Russian: Союз Великого дела, romanized: S.V.D. - Soyuz velikogo dela) is a 1927 Soviet silent historical drama film directed by Grigori Kozintsev and Leonid Trauberg about the 1825 Decembrist revolt.

== Plot ==
The film centers around the Decemberist uprising in southern Russia, taking place during the winter of 1825, just before and during the rebellion. The story follows Medoks, a swindler and adventurer, who wins a ring with the initials "S. V. D." in a gambling den. These initials originally belonged to the fiancée of the man who lost the game, and throughout the film, their meaning changes multiple times, symbolizing different interpretations such as "Happiness Drives Fools," "The Union of Great Deeds," "Follow… Betray… Finish!" and "The Union of Merry Deeds."

Medoks, a cardsharp, declares the first interpretation of the initials to be "Happiness Drives Fools" and seeks to enter local society by asking the wife of General Vishnevsky for help. She refuses, but when Officer Sukhanov arrives to arrest Medoks, the swindler shows him the ring, claiming it represents the "Union of Great Deeds." Sukhanov, believing Medoks to be part of an anti-tsarist conspiracy, refrains from carrying out the arrest. Medoks later provides a new, more sinister interpretation of the initials, "Follow… Betray… Finish!" and becomes embroiled in the political scheming of the rebellion.

Sukhanov falls in love with the wife of the Decemberist leader, General Vishnevsky, while Medoks, for money, betrays the rebel leaders, leading to the failure of the uprising. As Medoks celebrates in a gambling house, he mocks Sukhanov and attempts to kill him. However, Vishnevskaya, having received a letter from Medoks, saves Sukhanov. Medoks, disguised as Colonel Sokovnin, approaches General Weissemar, who was involved in suppressing the rebellion, and proposes using the ring to lure imprisoned rebels into a trap. Sukhanov eventually breaks into the prison and orchestrates a daring escape for the rebels. As they flee through a secret passage to a church, they face a standoff with soldiers, but the rebels manage to avoid bloodshed, and only one soldier shoots Sukhanov. In the film's original version, Sukhanov dies, but in the version tailored for European audiences, he survives.

== Cast ==
- Emil Gal as Gambler
- Sergei Gerasimov as Medoks
- Konstantin Khokhlov as General Vishnevsky
- Andrei Kostrichkin as Servant of Medoks
- Sofiya Magarill as Vishnevskaya
- Mikhael Mishel as General Weismar
- Pyotr Sobolevsky as Sukhanov
- Oleg Zhakov as Young soldier
- Yanina Zheymo as Circus actress

== Reception ==
In a 2008 survey of their 10 favourite Russian films by Seans magazine, film critic Nina Tsyrkun listed it eighth, and film historians Nikolai Izvolov and Maya Turovskaya respectively listed it eighth and ninth.
