= Leonid Trauberg =

Soviet film director, screenwriter

- Born: Leonid Zakharovich Trauberg; 17 January 1902; Odessa, Russian Empire (now Ukraine)
- Died: 14 November 1990 (aged 88); Moscow, Soviet Union (now Russia)
- Occupations: Film director Screenwriter
- Years active: 1924–1961

Leonid Zakharovich Trauberg (Russian: Леонид Захарович Трауберг, 17 January 1902 – 14 November 1990) was a Soviet film director and screenwriter. He directed 17 films between 1924 and 1961 and was awarded the Stalin Prize in 1941. Trauberg was Jewish, and was fiercely attacked by Soviet authorities during the so-called "anti-cosmopolitan" period following World War II.

== Biography ==
Leonid Trauberg was born 17 January 1902 (there is conflicting information that he was born the previous year) in Odessa. His father, Zahar Davidovich Trauberg (1879, Odessa – 1932, Leningrad) was a publisher and a journalist, an employee of "Southern Review" and "New Gazette" newspaper (1918), later director of the printing house LUCS (Leningrad Union of Consumer Societies) in Leshtukov Lane, 13; mother, Emilia Solomonovna Weiland (1881, Bessarabia Orhei – 1934, Leningrad), was a homemaker. With the move to Petrograd, the family settled in the house number 7, Apt. 4 Kolomna street.

In December 1921, together with Grigori Kozintsev, G. K. Kryzhitsky and Sergei Yutkevich he wrote the "Manifesto of the Eccentric Theater", which was announced during a debate organized by them. In 1922, Kozintsev and Trauberg organized a theater workshop "Factory of the Eccentric Actor" (FEKS), and in the same year staged an eccentric re-imagining of the play Marriage by Nikolai Gogol. For two years they staged three more plays based on their own material, and in 1924 moved their experiments in the area of eccentric comedy in film, transforming the theater workshop into the Film School FEKS.

The Adventures of Oktyabrina (1924) – the first short film of Kozintsev and Trauberg was a continuation of their theatrical experiences based on their own script; it was an attempt to combine politics (to expose the NEPman who helped the imperialists) with outright buffoonery and according to Yury Tynyanov, "a rampant collection of tricks, which the directors amassed, starved for movies." In the second eccentric short film Mishki versus Yudenich (1925) which no longer starred variety and circus actors who joined the directors from the theater (among them was Sergey Martinson), instead the actors were students of the film school, including Sergei Gerasimov, Janina Żejmo, Andrei Kostrichkin.

The first feature film of Kozintsev and Trauberg – romantic melodrama The Devil's Wheel (1926), scripted by Adrian Piotrovsky – was already a mature work. Love for dazzling eccentricity was combined with a convincing display of urban life. In this film was established the constant creative collective of FEKS's; not including the directors, it included the cinematographer Andrei Moskvin and artist Evgeny Eney, who worked with Kozintsev during almost all of his films.

In the years 1926–1932, Leonid Trauberg taught at the Leningrad Institute of Performing Arts, in 1926–1927 he was the head of the film department of the Leningrad Theatre Institute. In 1961–1965 he taught at the USSR State Committee for Cinematography at VKSR.

He died on 13 November 1990 and was buried in Moscow at Kuntsevo Cemetery.

== Family ==
- Brother – Ilya Z. Trauberg, film director.
- Brother – Victor Z. Trauberg (11 July 1903 Odessa – 13 September 1974, Leningrad), editorial staff member of the magazine "Life Theater", subsequently employed as a doctor.
- Wife (1924) – Vera Lande-Bezverkhova (3 February 1901 Odessa – 7 January 1998, Moscow), dancer, ballerina, film actress.
- Daughter – interpreter Natalia L. Trauberg.

== Awards ==
- Stalin Prize of the first degree (1941) – for the Maxim trilogy (1934, 1937, 1938)
- Honored Artist of the RSFSR (1967)
- People’s Artist of the RSFSR (1987)
- Nika Award for "Honor and Dignity" (1988)
- Order of Lenin
- Order of the Red Banner of Labour (1939) – for the film The Vyborg Side (1938)

== Filmography ==
Note: all films before 1947 are co-directed with Grigori Kozintsev

- The Adventures of Oktyabrina (Похождения Октябрины) (1924)
- Mishki versus Yudenich (Мишки против Юденича) (1925)
- The Devil's Wheel (Чёртово колесо) (1926)
- The Overcoat (Шинель) (1926)
- The Club of the Big Deed (С.В.Д.) (1927)
- Little Brother (Братишка) (1927)
- The New Babylon (Новый Вавилон) (1929)
- Alone (Одна) (1931)
- The Youth of Maxim (Юность Максима) (1934)
- The Return of Maxim (Возвращение Максима) (1937)
- The Vyborg Side (Выборгская сторона) (1938)
- The Young Fritz (Юный Фриц) (1943)
- Actress (Актриса) (1943)
- Simple People (Простые люди) (1946)
- The Soldiers Marched On (Шли солдаты) (1958)
- Dead Souls (Мертвые души) (1960)
- Wind of Freedom (Вольный ветер) (1961); co-directed with Andrei Tutyshkin

== Literature ==
- Дубин, А. С. (2008). "Дома №7, 11 и 15–17 на Коломенсой улице" (PDF). История Петербурга. pp. 27–36. Archived from the original (PDF) on 2 December 2013.
- Нусинова, Н. (2003). "Памяти учителя". Kinovedcheskie Zapiski. No. 63. Киноведческие записки. pp. 207–216. ISSN 0235-8212. Archived from the original on 11 November 2012.
- Нусинова, Н. (2012). ""Фридка очень меня любил". Беседа с А. Н.Кольцатым (22.II.1994, Лос-Анджелес)" (PDF). Kinovedcheskie Zapiski. No. 100/101. Киноведческие записки. pp. 391–418. ISSN 0235-8212. Archived from the original (PDF) on 3 December 2013.
