= Yanina Zhejmo =

Soviet actress (1909–1987)

- Born: Yanina Boleslavovna Zhejmo; 29 May 1909; Volkovysk, Russian Empire (now Vawkavysk, Belarus)
- Died: 29 December 1987 (aged 78); Warsaw, Polish People's Republic
- Occupation: Actress
- Years active: 1925–1975
- Spouse(s): Andrei Kostrichkin; Iosif Kheifits; Leon Jeannot

Yanina Boleslavovna Zhejmo (Russian: Янина Болеславовна Жеймо; Polish: Janina Bolesławowna Żejmo; 29 May 1909 – 29 December 1987) was a Soviet actress with Polish parents. She appeared in more than 30 films between 1925 and 1955.

== Partial filmography ==
- Mishki versus Yudenich (1925, Short) - youngster
- The Devil's Wheel (1926, Short)
- The Overcoat (1926)
- Somebody Else's Coat (1927) - Circus actress
- Little Brother (1927, Short)
- The Club of the Big Deed (1927)
- The New Babylon (1929) - Therese, a seamstress
- Road to the World (1929)
- The Blue Express (1929)
- Alone (1931) - Young Teacher
- Man from Prison (1931)
- Seeking Asylum (1932)
- My Motherland (1933) - Olya
- Song of Happiness (1934) - Anuk
- Red Army Days (1935) - Kika, her friend
- Girl Friends (1936) - Asya
- Lenochka i vinograd (1936)
- Enemies (1938) - Nadya
- A Soldier Was Returning (1939) - Froska Kotko - Semen's sister
- Doctor Kalyuzhnyy (1939)
- Adventures of Korzinkina (1941, Short) - Korzinkina
- Boyevoy kinosbornik 12 (1942) - (segment "Vanka")
- Two Soldiers (1943) - Nurse
- The Young Fritz (1943) - Pchyolka (segment 'Pchyolka' / 'The bee')
- March–April (1944) - Cadet Katya Veselova
- We from the Urals (1944) - Vera Zavarina
- Cinderella (1947) - Cinderella
- Two Friends (1954) - Kostya's mother
- The Snow Queen (1957) - Gerda (voice) (final film role)
