= Grigori Kozintsev =

Soviet film director (1905–1973)

- Григорий Козинцев
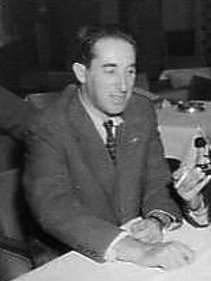
- Kozintsev in 1958
- Born: Grigori Moiseyevich Kozintsov; 22 March [O.S. 9 March] 1905; Kiev, Kiev Governorate, Russian Empire (present-day Ukraine)
- Died: 11 May 1973 (aged 68); Leningrad, Russian SFSR, Soviet Union
- Occupations: Film director; Theater director; Screenwriter; Pedagogue
- Years active: 1919–1973

Grigori Mikhailovich Kozintsev (Note: Russian: Григорий Михайлович Козинцев, romanized: Grigory Mikhaylovich Kozintsev; Ukrainian: Григорій Михайлович Козінцев, romanized: Hryhorii Mykhailovych Kozintsev) (born Grigori Moiseyevich Kozintsov; (Note: Russian: Григорий Моисеевич Козинцов, romanized: Grigory Moiseyevich Kozintsov; Ukrainian: Григорій Мойсейович Козинцов, romanized: Hryhorii Moiseiovych Kozyntsov)22 March [O.S. 9 March] 1905 – 11 May 1973) was a Soviet theatre and film director, screenwriter and pedagogue. He was named People's Artist of the USSR in 1964. In 1965 he was a member of the jury at the 4th Moscow International Film Festival. Two years later he was a member of the jury of the 5th Moscow International Film Festival. In 1971 he was the president of the jury at the 7th Moscow International Film Festival.

== Biography ==
Grigori Kozintsev was born in the Jewish family of a doctor, therapist and pediatrician Moisei Isaakovich Kozintsov (1859–1930) and his wife Anna Grigorievna Lurie was from a rabbinical family from Kiev. His mother's sister was the gynecologist and scientist-physician Roza Lurie. The mother's brother was the dermatologist Alexander G. Lurie (1868–1954), a professor and chair of venereal skin diseases at the Kiev Postgraduate Medical Institute (1919–1954).

Kozintsev spent his early childhood in Novozybkov of Chernigov Governorate, where his father served as the district sanitary inspector, as well as a doctor of the Novozybkov girls' school and where Kozintsev entered the first grade of the Novozybkov school.

Since 1913, after moving from Novozybkov, he studied at the Kiev-Pechersk Gymnasium, since 1915 – the 5th gymnasium in Pechersk. The father admitted patients at the commercial clinic "Kvisisana" on the Large Zhitomir Street, 19, and at a free dispensary in the surgical hospital, built by philanthropist Babushkin on the Tverskaya Street, 7. The family lived in a house number 22, Apt. 2 on Mariinsko Annunciation Street (later Saksaganskogo Street). In 1919 together with his sister Lyubov, he attended a private school-studio of painting of Aleksandra Ekster. Together with other students of the school he took part in a celebratory avant-garde design of the Kiev streets.

The theater attracted him most of all; he began work with participation in the mural decorations of the famous spectacle of Kote Marjanishvili Fuente Ovejuna by the Spanish playwright Lope de Vega. He worked in the Solovtsov Theater from the age of 14. With Mardzhanov and his friends Sergei Yutkevich, Michał Waszyński and Aleksei Kapler he created a puppet theater, and then the experimental theater "Harlequin", in which he staged a play that he wrote himself, and finally carried out a street performance based on the folk play King Maximilian. In early 1920 he went to Petrograd and entered the class of Nathan Altman in the Free Art Workshops (formerly Imperial Academy of Arts (today the St. Petersburg State Academic Institute of Painting, Sculpture and Architecture named after I. Y. Repin) and at the same time directed at the Studio Theater Comic Opera, led by Kote Marjanishvili.

In December 1921, Kozintsev contributed the "Salvation in the Trousers" section to the Manifesto of the Eccentric Theater, (the other contributors were Leonid Trauberg, G. K. Kryzhitsky and Sergei Yutkevich), which was announced during a debate organized by them. In 1922, Kozintsev and Trauberg organized an avant-garde theater workshop Factory of the Eccentric Actor (FEKS), and in the same year staged an eccentric re-imagining of the play Marriage by Nikolai Gogol. For two years they staged three more plays based on their own material, and in 1924 moved their experiments in the area of eccentric comedy in film, transforming the theater workshop into the Film School FEKS.

In 1924 he began working at the film studio Sevzapkino (now Lenfilm) initially directing short films alongside Trauberg. The Adventures of Oktyabrina (1924) – their first short film was a continuation of their theatrical experiences based on their own script; it was an attempt to combine politics (to expose the NEPman who helped the imperialists) with outright buffoonery and according to Yury Tynyanov, "a rampant collection of tricks, which the directors amassed, starved for movies." In the second eccentric short film Mishki versus Yudenich (1925) which no longer starred variety and circus actors who joined the directors from the theater (among them was Sergey Martinson), instead the actors were students of the film school, including Sergei Gerasimov, Janina Żejmo, Andrei Kostrichkin.

The first feature film by Kozintsev and Trauberg was romantic melodrama The Devil's Wheel in 1926, scripted by Adrian Piotrovsky. Love for dazzling eccentricity was combined with a convincing display of urban life. In this film was established the constant creative collective of FEKS's; not including the directors, it included the cinematographer Andrei Moskvin and artist Evgeny Eney, who worked with Kozintsev during almost all of his films.

FEKS's next film, The Overcoat (1926), a film adaptation of "St. Petersburg stories" by Nikolai Gogol, became one of the masterpieces of Soviet silent cinema. A script by the famous Russian writer Yury Tynyanov helped evolve his directorial vision, expressive visual choices and eccentric, on the verge of grotesque acting of actors led to the creation of a film which was stylistically in "the manner of Gogol."

The vigorous and organized working team FEKS sought in every movie to search for a new direction, and in 1927 also released a contemporary comedy Little Brother (1927) based on their own script, and immediately followed up with the historical melodrama The Club of the Big Deed (1927), scripted by Yury Tynyanov and G. Oxman, based on the material of the Decembrist uprising. Both films enjoyed success with the audience, especially The Club of the Big Deed which the famous Russian critic Viktor Shklovsky described as "the most elegant film of the Soviet Union".

Beginning in August 1927, Kozintsev was a teacher at the Leningrad Institute of Performing Arts, which was merged with the film school FEKS.

Starting from their first sound picture Alone (1931) which used experimental montage sound techniques, a new period began in the work of Kozintsev and Trauberg. This included the Maxim trilogy: The Youth of Maxim (1935); The Return of Maxim (1937) and The Vyborg Side (1939). The trilogy received acclaim in the Soviet Union but was banned as propaganda in the United States until the 1960s. Pirogov in 1947 was his first feature film that he directed on his own.

Kozintsev worked briefly in theater, staging the plays King Lear (1941), Othello (1943) and Hamlet (1954).

Beginning in 1944, and under the title of professor from 1960, Kozintsev led the director's workshop VGIK. Among his graduates were Eldar Ryazanov, Stanislav Rostotsky, Benjamin Dorman, and Vasily V. Katanyan.

His Don Quixote (1957) became a classic film adaptation, the first film version in colour. In 1962 Kozintsev published the book Our contemporary William Shakespeare, which became the theoretical preparation for his two outstanding Shakespearean adaptations: Hamlet (1964), (Lenin Prize, 1965; Special Prize of the International Film Festival in Venice, 1964) and King Lear (1970).

In 1964 he was given the title People's Artist of the USSR.

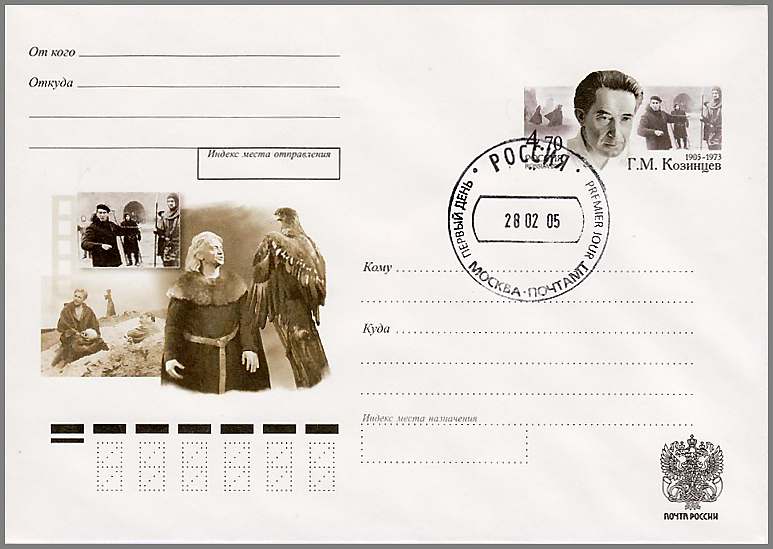
Russian 2005 commemorative envelope for Kozintsev's 100th birthday

In 1965–1971 Kozintsev led a directing workshop at the Lenfilm. He also wrote a historical and theoretical monograph "Deep Screen" (1971) and "Space Tragedy" (published posthumously in 1973).

He died on 11 May 1973 in Leningrad and was buried at Literatorskie Jetty of Volkovo Cemetery.

== Filmography ==
Note: all films before 1947 are co-directed with Leonid Trauberg

Year	Original title	English title	Notes
1924	Похождения Октябрины	The Adventures of Oktyabrina	director; screenwriter; film is lost
1925	Мишки против Юденича	Mishki versus Yudenich	director; screenwriter; film is lost
1926	Чёртово колесо	The Devil's Wheel	director
1926	Шинель	The Overcoat	director
1927	С.В.Д.	The Club of the Big Deed	director
1927	Братишка	Little Brother	director; screenwriter; film is lost
1929	Новый Вавилон	The New Babylon	director; screenwriter
1931	Одна	Alone	director; screenwriter
1934	Юность Максима	The Youth of Maxim	director; screenwriter
1937	Возвращение Максима	The Return of Maxim	director; screenwriter
1938	Выборгская сторона	The Vyborg Side	director; screenwriter
1943	Юный Фриц	The Young Fritz	director; film is lost
1946	Простые люди	Simple People	director; screenwriter
1947	Пирогов	Pirogov	director
1953	Белинский	Belinsky	director; screenwriter
1957	Дон Кихот	Don Quixote	director
1964	Гамлет	Hamlet	director; screenwriter
1971	Король Лир	King Lear	director; screenwriter
