= Art and culture in the Gulag labor camps =

Art and culture took on a variety of forms in the forced labor camps of the Gulag system that existed across the Soviet Union during the first half of the twentieth century. Theater, music, visual art, and literature played a role in camp life for many of the millions of prisoners who passed through the Gulag system. Some creative endeavors were initiated and executed by prisoners themselves (sometimes in secret), while others were overseen by the camp administration. Some projects benefited from prisoners who had been professional artists; others were organized by amateurs. The robust presence of the arts in the Gulag camps is a testament to the resourcefulness and resilience of prisoners there, many of whom derived material benefits and psychological comfort from their involvement in artistic projects.

== Theater and music ==
One of the most visible forms of art within the Gulag was performance. Many prisoners, from experienced actors and musicians to total amateurs, either participated in or attended theatrical productions in the camps. Occasionally, even camp officials became involved: in his memoir Dear America!, Thomas Sgovio describes a production in which the leading role was played by the head of the Camp Administration.

=== Early Gulag theaters ===
The phenomenon of Gulag theater dates back almost as far as the existence of Gulag. Prisoners at Solovetsky prison camp, the USSR's first Gulag camp, started an amateur theater group as early as 1923. Initially, the actors had no access to scripts, so they relied on memorized classics for material. The troupe was not officially recognized, and performers were given no special treatment; they often rehearsed after a full day of labor. The following year, however, the quality of performances at the camp greatly improved with the influx of a group of professional actors who had been arrested together.

=== Notable Gulag theaters ===
By the 1940s, many work camps had developed theater troupes, some completely amateur and others highly accomplished. Directors of certain Gulags became competitive about producing the best theatrical performances, and officials like the commander at Unzhlag would hand-pick talented prisoners to participate. According to Lev Kopelev, the priority that Unzhlag's commander placed on high-quality theater led the camp to become known as an “asylum for artists."

Talent was plentiful among Gulag prisoners, a number of whom had professional performing experience. The singers Vadim Kozin and Lidia Ruslanova, the actresses Valentina Tokarskaya and Zoya Fyodorova, and a host of other illustrious performers spent time in Gulag camps. Sometimes, too, non-prisoners were hired to supplement the camp's supply of performers. (This was the case in the theater at Vorkuta, where a professional director from Moscow was hired for certain shows.) The commander at Ukhtizhimlag, a camp in Ukhta, organized what writer and prisoner Lev Razgon called “a real opera troupe” featuring a soprano from the Harbin operetta, a dancer from the Bolshoi Ballet, and a well-known viola-player. The troupe's director was Konstantin Egert, an actor from the Maly Theater who had starred in the 1926 film The Legend of the Bear’s Wedding. Performances at Ukhta rivaled those of professional companies in cities like Moscow. The imposing building that once housed the Ukhtizhimlag theater still stands in Ukhta today.

The Dalstroy industrial construction trust, whose operation was based mainly on labor camps in the Kolyma region centered around the city of Magadan, emerged as a cultural hub with the arrival of director Ivan Fedorovich Nikishov in 1939. Nikishov and his staff sought to bolster their own prestige by creating a flourishing arts scene at Magadan. To that end, they built several new theaters and playhouses throughout the city.

Dalstroy developed a renowned theater troupe known as the Sevvostlag Club (Klub USVITL), which included many professional singers and dancers from among the local camps’ prisoners. The troupe performed mainly for the higher-up officials in Magadan but also sent “cultural brigades” to entertain officials and prisoners throughout Kolyma.

=== Types of performances staged ===
Gulag theater represented a wide variety of genres, from drama to dance performances to operas and operettas. Material was often (although not entirely) controlled by camp officials, who would make requests and censor plays and songs that a troupe intended to stage. Soviet propaganda was encouraged, and a certain amount of pro-Soviet material did end up being performed, including plays like The Russian Question (which follows an American journalist whose bosses force him to slander the USSR).

Most troupes, however, preferred the classics and popular pieces. In its early years, the theater at Solovetsky performed Anton Chekhov’s Uncle Vanya, Maxim Gorky’s Children of the Sun, and plays by Leonid Andreyev and Nikolai Gogol; it also held acrobatic and orchestral performances and films. At Vorkuta, performers staged the operas Eugene Onegin (by Alexander Pushkin) and Rigoletto (by Giuseppe Verdi). One troupe at Magadan performed operettas including Marketplace of Brides, Rose-Maria, and selections from Dona Juanita and Kholopka. The actress Tamara Petkevich appeared in Chekhov’s Jubilee and The Bear. Lev Razgon reports that performers at Ustvymlag staged “the most fashionable plays of the day,” including Gusev's Glory and Korneichuk's Plato Krechet, and singers sang popular songs like “ The Blue Scarf,” “Seagull,” and “You are waiting, Lizaveta.” He also recalls attending a performance of Emmerich Kálmán’s opera Silva.

Often, the stress and isolation of Gulag life prompted prisoners and officials alike to request positive and optimistic works rather than melancholy ones. Comedic acts were usually a great success. The theater troupe at Veselaya performed Shkvarkin’s comedy A Stranger’s Child and Karatygin’s vaudeville Dear Uncle on Three Legs, and Dimitri Panin’s memoir The Notebooks of Sologdin recounts the antics of a professional clown named Feigin.

=== Prison bands ===
More than other types of performance, music in the Gulag was often closely involved with the actual labor. Several camps incorporated music into the prisoners’ workdays. Sometimes, individual musicians or entire bands would accompany prisoners as they assembled in brigades and marched to work. Kazimierz Zarod describes how the camp band, consisting of a mix of amateurs and professionals who “together...made quite good music,” would be stationed at the gate each morning to play military-style music as prisoners set off for work. Tenor Vadim Kozin, Eddie Rosner's band performed in Kolyma region.

=== Treatment of performers ===
The treatment of performers involved in Gulag theater varied widely over time and among the different camps. Solovetsky's earliest theater group was completely voluntary and self-organized, and the actors (all amateurs) were afforded no special privileges. Like other prisoners, they put in full workdays clearing forests, and they had to schedule rehearsals during the few hours they had free. The musicians who comprised the band in Kazimierz Zarod's camp were also treated like non-performers: after the prisoners had passed through the gates on their way to work in the forest, the musicians simply put down their instruments and joined the march at the end of the line.

As the theater became a more prominent part of Gulag life, though, performers did begin to enjoy certain advantages, from work exemptions to better living quarters. Many performers were given extra rations and more comfortable beds and assigned easy or “soft” jobs instead of the hard labor demanded of other prisoners. In Unzhlag during the 1940s, performers were regularly employed to be nurses or clean the hospital; at Dmitlag, members of the camp orchestra received special clothing, including officers’ boots. Actors and musicians at Ustvymlag were registered as part of the “weak team,” occupying spots that would otherwise have been filled by the ailing and crippled, to avoid their having to go out to work. Sgovio recalls that all of the camp musicians slept in an unusually luxurious barrack and had “soft jobs—the cook, the barber, the bath manager, the accountants, etc.” Inmates who had been famous artists prior to their arrest might receive even more preferential treatment: the well-known tenor Pechkovsky, for example, was housed separately from other workers and regularly dined with officials’ wives on delicacies like butter and hot port wine. For non-celebrity prisoners, winning officials’ favor with a successful performance could sometimes mean the difference between keeping one's position and being transferred to a more strenuous job or a harsher camp. Dimitri Panin writes about a clown named Feigin who saved himself from transfer to a penal camp by performing a humorous dance for camp officials at their New Year's Eve party.

Many artists felt they gained spiritual as well as material benefits from being allowed to perform. Playing a role helped actors forget the brutal reality of their situation and provided a temporary escape from the hunger and oppression that characterized imprisonment. Georgy Feldgun, a violinist in the Dalstroy orchestra, reported that he “breathed the full air of freedom” while performing. Prisoners who had no performing experience sometimes taught themselves acting or music so they too could experience the relief it provided; Alexander Dolgun, for example, arranged for a fellow inmate to teach him guitar chords so he could play while the other men in the barracks sang. To actress Tamara Petkevich, the circumstances of the Gulag made performing an even deeper emotional experience; a particularly moving performance could feel like “the resurrection of the normal world.”

But even when they reaped material and psychological benefits, performers were still considered prisoners, and most aspects of their lives were far from comfortable. After a performance, singers in the renowned Ukhta opera troupe changed from their colorful costumes into plain uniforms and were ushered back to their quarters by guards who cursed and prodded them impatiently. Razgon describes witnessing this process and being shocked to see the faces that had appeared “handsome, young, happy and elegant” in the operetta overcome by exhaustion and despair, “just like the rest of us.” In The Gulag Archipelago, Aleksandr Solzhenitsyn recalls how, at the larger theaters in Vorkuta, Norilsk, and Solikamsk, armed guards waited behind the scenes to escort performers whose acts had been well-received back to camp and to lead those who had not been so successful to the punishment block. Although they may have had lighter work, performers were still treated like slaves; they were still at the mercy of camp officials, and female actresses were often forced to become commanders’ mistresses. Indeed, even though they enjoyed superior treatment, actors in the Gulag faced the unique psychological pressure of having to portray free men and women while remaining enslaved themselves. It may have been this challenge that led to particularly high suicide rates among performers.

Still, involvement in a camp theater almost always meant a reprieve from at least some of the hardships of Gulag life. Actress Tatyana Leshchenko-Sukhomlina wrote in her autobiography that being accepted into her camp's theatrical troupe was “a great stroke of luck, for it meant working in a warm building and countless other benefits.” Simeon Vilensky, a Gulag survivor who later studied theater in the camps, confirmed that, all things considered, prisoners who participated in theatrical performances had a higher likelihood of survival than their counterparts who worked in the mines.

=== Significance of theater to non-performers ===
Even prisoners who were not directly involved in Gulag theater benefited from the opportunity to attend performances, which may explain why they seldom displayed resentment toward the performers (in spite of the preferential treatment members of theatrical troupes enjoyed). Just as actors saw participating in theater as a respite from the harsh conditions of the Gulag, performances afforded prisoner audiences a distraction from their plight and the moral support they needed to survive brutal workdays. Simeon Vilensky recalled that actors, singers, and dancers in the camps “helped other people to remain people.”

Camp officials benefited at least as much as ordinary prisoners from the entertainment their theaters offered. Some of the most renowned troupes, such as Dalstroy's during the 1940s, performed almost exclusively for camp staff. Many directors came to view the quality of their camp theater as a status symbol and competed with one another to produce the most impressive performances. Theater troupes were regularly sent on tour to exhibit their talent to officials at neighboring camps.

Officials also took advantage of the camp performances as a way of motivating and rewarding other workers. Sometimes musicians accompanied prisoners as they marched to work in the mornings; at other camps, bands were reserved for special occasions, playing only for workers who met or exceeded their production quota. Razgon recalled that the theatrical club in Vozhael occasionally performed for whichever of several nearby camps achieved the best “output.” Soviet cultural critic Boris Gusman, who had served as assistant director of the Bolshoi Theatre and director of the Music Committee for the Soviet Arts Counsel, died in Vozhael in 1944.

== Propaganda and the arts ==
In addition to prisoner-generated art, a certain amount of culture and creativity in the Gulags was encouraged—even mandated—by the government. The Cultural-Educational Department, or Kulturno-Vospitatelnaya Chast (KVCh), was an organization conceived with the ostensible goal of “re-educating” prisoners to help them adjust to the expectations, conditions, and purposes of the camps. The earliest KVChs (which formed in the 1920s under the title “Political Educational Sections”) were meant to provide a communist substitute for prison priests and religious services. In practice, their main function was to supply propaganda intended to boost the camps’ production. They also served simply to keep inmates occupied, since excessive free time might, authorities feared, lead prisoners to revert to their former criminal habits.

The KVCh at each camp was headed by a free employee charged with selecting and supervising instructors, workers who usually enjoyed more comfortable treatment than other prisoners and were not required to participate in hard labor. By the 1940s, every camp was supposed to have at least one KVCh instructor and a building (called the KVCh “club”) where performances, lectures, and discussions could be held. Generally, the KVCh's efforts targeted criminal prisoners rather than political ones, who were considered unlikely to respond to re-education. Theoretically, at least, inmates chosen to be instructors should come from lower-class backgrounds, and in some KVCh-produced theatricals, political prisoners were allowed only to play instruments, not to speak or sing.

The extent of the KVCh's involvement in prisoners’ lives varied. Gustav Herling recalled that the KVCh at his camp did nothing except maintain a small library and sometimes organize inmate performances. The KVCh at Aleksandr Solzhenitsyn's camp was slightly more active: it was responsible for, among other duties, producing three amateur theatrical performances each year and supplying materials for artists to decorate the compound. At other camps, the KVCh published newspapers, hung propagandistic posters, organized lectures, deployed brigades of prisoners to encourage other workers with pro-Soviet songs, showed films, and sponsored various other “self-taught creative activities,” including sports and board games.

Although the KVCh was supposed to provide opportunities for artistic expression, apathetic officials and heavy censorship sometimes hindered its effectiveness. At some camps, though the KVCh purported to produce regular theatrical shows, the only performances that actually took place were for the benefit of outsiders. Solzhenitsyn describes the chief of his KVCh, expecting a visit from a superior officer, ordering a bewildered worker with almost no musical experience to organize a choir. Herling reported that the selection at his KVCh library was limited to multiple copies of Stalin’s Problems of Leninism, other pro-Soviet texts, and a few Russian classics. Material for performances was similarly restricted; if prisoners tried to contribute to the planning of shows, KVCh officials scrutinized the program and any potentially subversive pieces were axed.

Despite these frustrations, though, most inmates took full and enthusiastic advantage of the creative opportunities offered by the KVCh. Even workers who had no interest in theater often enlisted in performances because the rehearsal schedule allowed them more liberty to move around the camp. For others, the excitement of participation even in KVCh-supervised shows offered a welcome “reminder...that life despite everything still exists.” Herling describes how prisoners who were already exempt from work for medical reasons would volunteer eagerly to help clean and decorate the “cultural” barrack before a concert. Originally intended to inspire prisoners to work harder, the KVCh became, for many, a much-needed source of moral support in the face of isolation, hunger, exhaustion, and dehumanizing labor conditions.

== Visual art ==
Visual art in the Gulag camps was either controlled through the KVCh or practiced in private and concealed.

=== Visual art in the KVCh ===
In the KVCh, artists were commissioned to contribute to the décor of the camp. This work was known as "soft labor," and the artists chosen for the job were considered to become "trusties" of the officials. Some artists felt morally opposed to such work, but the luxuries it provided, including access to better food, made the work enviable among prisoners.

Artists in the KVCh were responsible for maintaining the camp's image. Among other tasks, they were assigned to paint number tags for inmates, communist slogans and placards for the camps, bulletins with updated work percentages of the brigades, and portraits of Stalin. Some artists were assigned to paint idealized portraits of fellow inmates, which could be sent home in place of photographs to mask the horrors of the prisoners’ lives. The culture clubs and barracks were also decorated by KVCh artists. Painters reproduced famous nineteenth-century Russian paintings, often of the Peredvizhniki School, to be hung in the administrative buildings. Thomas Sgovio, an Italian-American artist, was provided with an art studio in the OLP Mestprom where he and two other artists worked full-time to reproduce famous paintings which were then sold to the free-citizens.

=== Ingenuity of Gulag artists ===
In the absence of standard art supplies, artists in the Gulag had to create their own, working from what materials they could scrounge up in the camps. Artists who did not have the luxury of rule-bending officials or the structure of the KVCh to support them had to be especially innovative.

Artists learned to use whatever they could get their hands on. Paint could be made by mixing dried powdered clay with oatmeal. Those with access to swine used pig's blood to thicken and color paint and bristles collected in the pig sties to make paintbrushes. Some artists even learned to make specialized media. Sgovio learned from fellow artists to make oil paints by mixing dried house paint with sunflower-seed oil. Mikhail Sokolov was able to make miniature textured landscapes using clay mixed with tooth powder and powdered medicine. To make canvases, foot-rags, floor mops and flour bags were stretched out against wooden parcel boxes.

To make thread for knitting and embroidery, inmates collected loose threads from rags and underwear and held them together with soap. Needles were made from fishbones saved after meals or dug out from frozen waste piles, pieces of wire sharpened to points, or the teeth of combs. Using wire needles and ink made from the rubber of galoshes, burned to ash and mixed with water and sugar, Sgovio developed a technique for tattooing fellow inmates.

The sets and costumes for theater productions showcased artists’ abilities to make something out of nothing. Cotton wool was transformed into wigs; medical gauze and fishing nets became lace; bast matting could be made to look like velvet; mess hall stools and canes could be combined to make fine furniture. By a stretch of imagination, artists were able to transform the artifacts of their base conditions into standard scenery, creating for themselves an escape into normalcy.

=== Treatment of artists ===
Treatment of artists varied from camp to camp. Officially, art produced outside of the bounds of the KVCh was prohibited. However, some officials bent the rules, allowing artists to work on the side and sometimes even providing the necessary supplies. In the Solovetsky camps, treatment of artists varied across time. In the 1920s, many artists were allowed to work freely and even given the liberty to produce their own magazine, Solovietski Ostrova ("Solovetsky Islands"). By the late 1930s, however, with the division of the Gulag into penal colonies and hard labor camps, rules were more strictly enforced and the private production of artwork was suppressed.

Some officials took advantage of the presence of skilled artists. Artists were often ordered to paint portraits of the officials and their families. Sgovio was once ordered by the Commandant of Nekiskan to decorate his room, with the most prominent request being a full-sized portrait of “a beautiful nude woman,” to be painted on a bed-sheet. In the absence of specialized craftspeople, artists were often made to work outside of their area of expertise. Anna Andreeva, a painter by trade, recalled being asked to decorate tombstones, make crockery and fix and make new toys for the children of officials. Despite his complete lack of experience with carpentry, Sgovio was assigned in Gerba to work in the carpenter brigade, solely on the basis of a good profile sketch of the “Work Assigner.”

Artists were also employed by camp administrators for special tasks. Oleg Ditmar, a colleague of Sgovio in the Mestprom art studio, worked in the Administration Hospital painting water-colors of patients as visual documentation to be sent to Moscow for case studies. Mikhail Rudakov was assigned to similar work in the hospital of Vorkutlag. In camps with no KVCh and no official staff positions for artists, administrators sometimes bent the rules to allow artists to work for them. In OLP Ekspeditionni, Sgovio was added to the “sick list” so that he could fulfill the unofficial and undocumented position of sign-painter.

=== Art among inmates ===
Artists often received requests from fellow inmates for artwork in exchange for extra rations. The Vory, an organized gang of thieves in the camps, were frequent customers, having stolen enough stores to be able to provide art supplies and pay artists for their work. Sgovio tattooed several of the Vory with nude females, mermaids, text, and even, upon request, a large portrait of Lenin on the chest, so that the recipient "wouldn’t get shot by a firing squad."

Sketches of nude women were a common request among inmates, becoming the objects of desire for inmates who had not seen women in years. Sgovio was often asked to sketch nude women for inmates as well as officials. These sketches formed the center of ‘masturbation orgies’ among inmates.

Some inmates also requested artwork to send to their loved ones. Sgovio added a sketched bouquet of roses to a prisoner's love letter, receiving white bread and tobacco in exchange.

=== Survival by art ===
Art became for some artists a means of survival in the camps. By securing soft jobs and access to better food, artists were able to outlive their fellow inmates. Even in the absence of official positions, working on the side earned them extra gruel, water, white bread, butter, sugar, tea and tobacco. In Chai-Urya, known as the “Valley of Death,” Sgovio was on the verge of starvation when the bread distributor requested pictures of nude girls, providing the brigade with extra bread in exchange. Once the word spread that an artist had talent, life in the camps became easier. When the Work Allocator in Chai-Urya heard that Sgovio was an artist, he commissioned him to paint a reproduction of Three Hero-Knights, by Vassnyetsov. For two weeks Sgovio was given extra food and allowed the luxury of sitting and painting all day, during which time he could feel the flesh returning to his starved body.

=== Famous Gulag artists ===
Among the prisoners of the Gulag camps were several well-known artists: Mikhail Sokolov, Boris Sveshnikov, Mikhail Rudakov, Vasily Shukhaev, Solomon Gershov, Ülo Sooster, Lev Kropivinitsky, and Fedot F Suchkov.

==== Mikhail Sokolov ====
Mikhail Ksenofontovich Sokolov was a prolific painter and the head of the Proletkult art studio in Moscow (1910), professor at Moscow Art College (1923–25), Yaroslavl Art and Teacher-Training secondary school (1925–35) and Moscow Institute of Painters’ and Graphic Artists’ Professional Development (1936–38). He was arrested 1938 and sentenced to seven years in the Taiga station of the Kemerovo region. While imprisoned he produced miniature landscapes in secret, in the privacy of his bunk.

==== Boris Sveshnikov ====
He was arrested in 1946 along with fellow students for radical anti-Soviet comments and sentenced to eight years in camp. While imprisoned in the Vetlosian camp, he worked in an art shop during his night-watch shift in the woodworking brigade. After release in 1954, Sveshnikov illustrated books for such prominent authors as Hoffman, Maeterlinck, Goethe, and Andersen, among others.

==== Mikhail Rudakov ====
Mikhail Rudakov, a specialist in book illustration, design and painting, was arrested in 1943 and sentenced to five years in the Vorkutlag camp. There he worked in the hospital, sketching patients. In 1949 he was released from prison, but forced to remain in the Arkhangelsk region. There he served as stage designer at the Kotlas Drama Theatre.

==== Vasily Shukhaev ====
Vasily Shukhaev was a painter and professor of painting at the Academy of Arts in Leningrad and the Academy of Architecture in Moscow (1935–37). He was arrested in 1937 and served eight years in the Kolyma camps, where he was eventually assigned work as stage designer for the Magadan Theatre of Music and Drama.

==== Solomon Gershov ====
Solomon Gershov was arrested in 1932 for criticizing the Revolution Artists Association. Upon arrest, all of his works were destroyed. He was released in 1934, only to be arrested again in 1948; all of his works destroyed yet again. While serving his second term of 15 years, he was employed as a designer. His paintings have been exhibited in the USSR, London, Washington, New York, Paris and Philadelphia.

==== Ülo Sooster ====
Ülo Sooster, while serving his ten-year sentence in Karlag, made portraits of camp inmates in secret. Many of these were found by officials and destroyed, but some survived until his release in 1956. He remained active as a painter and book illustrator after his release, contributing to exhibitions for the Moscow department of the Soviet Artists Union.

==== Lev Kropivinitsky ====
Lev Kropivinitsky was imprisoned in the Balkhash area and forced to remain there even after his release from prison. He worked at the Balkhash Palace of Culture, where he was in charge of stage design, direction, and management of the art studio. His graphic art is now displayed in over 100 exhibitions in Russia, the US, France and Czechoslovakia.

==== Fedot Suchkov ====
Now known for his work as a sculptor and poet, Fedot Fedotovich Suchkov was first introduced to sculpting while in the confines of the Minlag camp. After his release, he authored memorial sculptures dedicated to his friends and former inmates Varlam Shalamov and Alexander Solzhenitsyn.

== Literature ==
Although backbreaking labor, dehumanizing treatment, and vigilant officials made reading and writing spiritually and logistically difficult, Gulag life did, for many, involve some form of literature, whether written or oral. Many prisoners also wrote about their experience in the camps after they were released.

=== Access to books ===
The quantity and type of literature available to Gulag prisoners was limited at best. Many camps did have libraries, but although a few contained impressive collections—Solovetsky's, for example, at one point housed about 30,000 books—others had meager and sometimes heavily censored offerings. Prisoners were often prohibited from having books of their own, especially ones with content that was seen as possibly anti-communist. Alexander Dolgun describes how the camp commandant would regularly visit his barracks and confiscate poetry books or books discussing religion. Prisoners did occasionally manage to conceal books, as in the case of a woman who lent Gustav Herling a copy of Fyodor Dostoyevsky’s The House of the Dead.

But while some prisoners plotted to sneak illicit reading material into the camps, others resisted even the literature the Gulag administration offered. Uneducated inmates often found scholarly pursuits like reading to be too strenuous in addition to everything else they had to endure. Officials who tried to teach illiterate prisoners would fail because the task of learning to read was too taxing for men and women already coping with starvation and exhaustion.

=== Prisoner-produced publications ===
Cut off from the outside world, some camps put out their own newspapers and magazines. The earliest prisoners at Solovetsky took advantage of the monks’ old lithography equipment at the camp to print several periodicals of their own, including the Solovetskie Ostrova ("Solovetsky Islands") and the Solovetskoi Lageram ("Solovetsky Camps"). They published cartoons; poetry and fiction, which often expressed prisoners’ loneliness and longing for their families and homes; and scholarly articles, which covered topics ranging from local architecture to island wildlife to fur farming. This much journalistic freedom was unusual, however; in many other camps, newspapers were closely monitored or even produced by the administration, so that they contained mainly propaganda.

=== Storytelling and recitation ===
Even heavy censorship, though, could not smother many prisoners’ creative spirit. Storytelling was a common pursuit among inmates, who would recount their experiences, tales of their own invention, or stories they recalled from books and movies. Alexander Dolgun once recited the plot of Les Misérables to attentive listeners, and Janusz Bardach told the story of The Three Musketeers.

Having an audience could pay off; inmates and officials alike would offer rewards in exchange for literary entertainment. Karol Colonna-Czosnowski was paid with food and tobacco by members of a gang of camp thieves for telling stories of the famous American gangsters Al Capone and John Dillinger. Leonid Finklestein was known for his skillful storytelling, and in return for his stories he was given special treatment—extra water breaks—by the brigadier leader. Many others describe how they were able to survive the camps mainly by entertaining the officials with stories and retellings of classic novels.

Reciting poetry, original or memorized, was another common practice. Like storytelling, poetry recitation could yield material rewards from an appreciative audience. Eugenia Ginzburg received water from fellow inmates each time she recited a poem, as a reward for “service to the community.” Saying poems aloud could be a social activity and a bonding experience for prisoners; Ginzburg recalls reciting poetry with her cellmate Julia Karepova for six hours a day during one period. Aleksei Smirnov tells in his memoirs of two scholars who together fabricated a fictitious eighteenth-century French poet and wrote his made-up verses.

For some prisoners, even the silent, private recollection of classic poetry was enough to make Gulag life tolerable: the writer Varlam Shalamov called poetry his “secret savior,” and Eugenia Ginzburg wrote in a poem of her own composition about the solace she found in reciting verses by Pushkin and Alexander Blok. Even in her cell, she wrote, she was “not alone” if she had poetry to keep her company. “They had taken my dress, my shoes and stockings, and my comb,” she recalled, “...but [poetry] it was not in their power to take away.”

=== Exiled writers ===
Just as many actors and artists were condemned to exile, a number of writers spent time in the Gulags as well. Circumstances in most camps made it difficult for these prisoners to continue writing: if the hard labor and brutal, dehumanizing conditions did not crush their creativity and motivation, the scarcity of materials like pen and paper posed logistical obstacles. Strictness varied from camp to camp, but physical writing was often prohibited, with the exception of the pro-Soviet jingles and captions the camp administration assigned some poets to compose. Private journaling was not favorably regarded. Anything Eugenia Ginzburg and her cellmate wrote, for example, had to be erased, because censors would confiscate their notebooks monthly. In many camps, prisoners who kept records or diaries could be punished if their notebooks were discovered.

Still, many writers in the Gulag (and some prisoners who had not written prior to their exile) managed to compose prose and especially poetry, often memorizing it without ever actually committing it to paper. Ginzburg wrote verses expressing both her despair and the comfort poetry gave her; Janusz Bardach invented stories to keep himself occupied through the mind-numbing days. Aleksandr Solzhenitsyn initially took notes on his experiences, but after they were destroyed he memorized his text using a complicated mnemonic process that involved laying out a configuration of matchstick fragments and rearranging them as he recited each line to himself.

=== Literature inspired by the Gulag ===
Many literary works have been published about the Gulag by former prisoners. Three of the most famous such Russian writers are Aleksandr Solzhenitsyn, Eugenia Ginzburg, and Varlam Shalamov. A Polish writer Gustaw Herling-Grudziński was liberated from a camp in 1941, left Soviet Union with Polish Armed Forces in the East and published his A World Apart in 1951. A number of ex-prisoners wrote memoirs describing their experiences in the camps, many of which have been translated into English.
