= Cinderella (1960 film) =

1960 film

- Russian: Хрустальный башмачок
- Directed by: Aleksandr Rou; Rostislav Zakharov
- Written by: Charles Perrault; Rostislav Zakharov
- Starring: Raisa Struchkova; Maryana Kolpakchi; Aleksandr Pavlinov; Yelena Ryabinkina; Elena Vanke
- Cinematography: Aleksandr Gintsburg
- Edited by: V. Bitiukova
- Music by: Sergei Prokofiev
- Release date: 1960
- Running time: 84 minute
- Country: Soviet Union
- Language: Russian

Cinderella (Russian: Хрустальный башмачок) is a 1960 Soviet dance film directed by Rostislav Zakharov and Aleksandr Rou and performed by the Bolshoi Ballet.

== Plot ==
The film is a screen version by Sergei Prokofiev's Cinderella ballet.

== Cast ==
- Raisa Struchkova as Cinderella
- Gennadi Ledyakh
- Elena Vanke
- Lesma Chadarayn
- Natalya Ryzhenko
- Aleksandr Pavlinov
- Ekaterina Maximova
- Maryana Kolpakchi
- Yelena Ryabinkina
- Natalya Taborko
