= The Skylarks are Singing =

1953 film by Uładzimier Korš-Sablin

- Directed by: Uładzimier Korš-Sablin; Kanstancin Sańnikaŭ
- Written by: Kandrat Krapiva
- Cinematography: Aleksandr Gintsburg
- Production company: Belarusfilm
- Release date: 1953
- Running time: 78 minutes
- Country: Soviet Union
- Language: Russian

The Skylarks are Singing (Russian: Поют жаворонки, romanized: Poyut zhavoronki) is a 1953 Soviet Belarusian comedy film directed by Uładzimier Korš-Sablin and Kanstancin Sańnikaŭ.

== Plot ==
Mikola Veras, the brigade leader of the "Nova Niva" (New Cornfield) collective farm, and Nastya, the agronomist of the "Svetly Put" (The Bright Path) collective farm, are planning to get married. However, they come from different collective farms, and a problem arises: where should the newlyweds live? In "Nova Niva," the wages are higher, and they receive more bread per workday, but there is no electricity, radio, or club. The chairman of the collective farm, Pytlevanny, considers these to be insignificant details. The party committee comes to the couple's aid. After uncovering the chairman's mistakes, the party leadership points out the unacceptable state of affairs in the social sphere. In the fall, after a rich harvest and with electricity now in their homes, Mikola and Nastya celebrate their wedding.

== Cast ==
- Liliya Stepanovna Drozdova as Nascia
- Ivan Šaciła as Mikoła Vieras
- Lidzija Ržeckaja as Aŭdoćcia
- Viera Poła as Paŭlina
- Uładzimier Dziadziuška as Pytlovannyj
- Hleb Hlebaŭ as Symon Vieras
- Pavel Molchanov as Regional Committee Secretary
- Barys Płatonaŭ as Tumiłovič
- Leanid Barančyk
- Kanstancin Siankievič
- Maryja Zinkievič as Collective Farmer

== Bibliography ==
- Prominent Personalities in the USSR. Scarecrow Press, 1968.
