= Who Laughs Last =

- Russian: Кто смеётся последним
- Directed by: Vladimir Korsh-Sablin
- Written by: Kandrat Krapiva
- Starring: Leonid Rakhlenko; Lidiya Shinko; Gleb Glebov; Vladimir Vladomirskiy; Liliya Drozdova
- Cinematography: Aleksandr Gintsburg
- Music by: Dmitri Kaminsky
- Release date: 1954
- Country: Soviet Union

Who Laughs Last (Russian: Кто смеётся последним) is a 1954 Soviet Belarusian comedy film directed by Vladimir Korsh-Sablin.

== Plot ==
The film tells about the scientist Tulyaga, telling his colleagues the story of how one person on the street thought that Tulyaga walking by is the White Guard Podgaetski himself, as a result of which Tulyaga was frightened and asked the passer-by to keep silent about it. But, as it turned out, they were eavesdropped by the gossip Zelkin, who later passed this information on to the director of the institute, or, to be more exact, ignorant, by the blame that got this post, to Gorlokhvatsky. Zelkin also spreads rumors that the new work of Chernous, who abused Zelkin, received negative reviews. The director decides to use the situation for personal purposes. But, as we all know well, he laughs best who laughs last.

== Cast ==
- Leonid Rakhlenko as Aleksandr Petrovich Gorlokhvatskiy
- Lidiya Shinko as Anna Pavlovna Gorlokhvatskaya
- Gleb Glebov as Nikita Semyonovich Tulyaga
- Vladimir Vladomirskiy as Aleksandr Petrovich Chernous
- Liliya Stepanovna Drozdova as Vera Mikhaylovna
- Ivan Shatillo as Mikhail Pavlovich Levanovich
- Boris Platonov as Zyolkin
- Zinaida Brovarskaya as Zina Zyolkina
- Lidiya Rzhetskaya as Katya
- Genrikh Grigonis as Nikifor
- Pavel Molchanov as Nikolay Vasilyevich Anikeyev
