= Mick Gordon (director) =

Northern Irish writer, film and theatre director

Mick Gordon (born 1970) is a Northern Irish writer, film and theatre director. Currently he is Guest Lecturer, MA Creative Writing, Queens University Belfast where he is also a PhD candidate - Translating Artificial Intelligence into Theatre.

== Personal ==
Mick Gordon was born in Belfast. He graduated from Wadham College, Oxford in 1992, with a First Class Honours Degree in Modern History. He lives in Northern Ireland, with his wife Sophie Hayles and their two children.

== Career ==
From 2012 to 2015 Gordon was Artistic Director of Aarhus Teater, Denmark. Previously he was Trevor Nunn's Associate Director at the Royal National Theatre in London and was Director of the National's Transformation Season. And Artistic Director of the Gate Theatre in London. He founded the charitable theatre company On Theatre to work in collaboration with experts from fields such as neurology, psychology, philosophy and theology. He has produced and directed over 100 theatre productions. He is the author of eight plays, and a collection of essays. His mentors were Peter Brook and Brian Friel.

== Awards ==
- 1996 John S Cohen Bursary Royal National Theatre Studio London UK
- 1998 Critics’ Circle Most Promising Newcomer London UK
- 1999 Art ACE Award Best Production Buenos Aires Argentina
- 2000 Peter Brook Award for Most Outstanding Theatre UK
- 2000 Closer ACE Award Best Production Buenos Aires Argentina
- 2001 My Fair Lady ACE Award Best Production Buenos Aires Argentina
- 2003 Betrayal Public Award Best Production Stockholm Sweden
- 2005 NESTA Dreamtime Award UK
- 2007 Grimms' Tales Best Production Belgrade Serbia
- 2008 Deepcut Five awards Edinburgh Festival UK
- 2013 Danish Reumart Award, Aarhus Theatre

== Directing ==
- 1993 Alice in Wonderland Playhouse Oxford
- 1993 The Telephone European Chamber Opera Hong Kong
- 1994 Cosi fan Tutte European Chamber Opera Hong Kong
- 1994 Tosca Playhouse Epsom
- 1995 Rigoletto Holland Park Opera London
- 1995 La Cenerentola Holland Park Opera London
- 1996 La Traviata Holland Park Opera, London
- 1996 The Soldiers Tale Institut Français, London
- 1996 Arabian Nights BAC London
- 1996 Renard National Youth Ballet London
- 1996 The Promise Battersea Arts Centre, London
- 1997 The Tales of Hoffmann National Theatre Studio London
- 1997 Hamlet National Theatre Studio London
- 1997 Measure for Measure English Touring Theatre
- 1998 Une Tempete Gate Theatre London
- 1998 Volunteers Gate Theatre London
- 1999 On Death (Intimate Death) Gate Theatre London
- 1999 Art National Theatre Buenos Aires
- 1999 Mad Dog Old Courthouse Belfast
- 1999 Salome Riverside Studios, London
- 1999 Marathon Gate Theatre London
- 2000 Trust Royal Court Theatre, London
- 2000 Closer Teatro Nacional Cervantes, Buenos Aires
- 2000 On Love Gate Theatre London
- 2001 My Fair Lady Teatro Nacional Cervantes, Buenos Aires
- 2001 Godspell Festival Theatre, Chichester
- 2001 The Walls National Theatre London
- 2002 Monkey! Young Vic Theatre, London
- 2002 Le Pub! National Theatre London
- 2002 A Prayer for Owen Meany National Theatre London
- 2003 Betrayal Strindbergs Intima Teater, Stockholm
- 2004 The Real Thing Strindbergs Intima Teater Stockholm
- 2005 A Play in Swedish English and Italian Royal Dramatic Theatre, Stockholm
- 2005 On Ego Soho Theatre London
- 2006 War Strindbergs Intima Teater, Stockholm
- 2006 Winners, Losers Strindbergs Intima Teater, Stockholm
- 2006 Optic Trilogy Royal Dramatic Theatre, Stockholm
- 2006 On Religion (Grace) Soho Theatre London
- 2007 Grimms' Tales Dusko Radovic Belgrade
- 2008 On Emotion Soho Theatre London
- 2008 Dancing at Lughnasa Lyric Theatre Belfast
- 2009 The Home Place Grand Opera House, Belfast An Granian Theatre Letterkenny
- 2009 The Ride of Your Life Polka Theatre, London
- 2009 Deep Cut Tricycle Theatre, London, Sherman Theatre, Cardiff, Traverse Theatre, Edinburgh
- 2010 The Tempest OSC/Wadham College 400th Anniversary
- 2010 Translations Curve Theatre Leicester
- 2010 Bea Soho Theatre, London
- 2011 Sweeney Todd Aarhus Theatre, Denmark
- 2011 Both Sides Belfast International Theatre Festival
- 2012 Uncle Vanya Lyric Theatre (Belfast)
- 2012 Ghosts Aarhus Theatre
- 2013 Dancing at Lughnasa Aarhus Theatre
- 2014 The Visit Aarhus Theatre
- 2015 On/Off Aarhus Theatre
- 2016 Door into the Dark Seamus Heaney Home Place
- 2017 Sinners Lyric Theatre (Belfast)
- 2017 Making History FrielFest
- 2018 The Music Room BBC NI
- 2018 Living Quarters FrielFest
- 2019 A Deal's a Deal RTE Storylands

== Writing ==
- 2005 On Ego Oberon Books
- 2005 On Love Oberon Books
- 2005 On Death (Intimate Death) Oberon Books
- 2006 On Religion (Grace) Oberon Books
- 2007 Conversations on Religion Continuum Books
- 2008 On Emotion Oberon Books
- 2009 The Ride of Your Life Oberon Books
- 2009 Identity and Identification Black Dog Publishing
- 2009 Conversations on Truth Continuum Books
- 2010 Pressure Drop Oberon Books
- 2010 Theatre and the Mind Oberon Books
- 2011 Bea Oberon Books
- 2015 ON/OFF Aarhus Teater
- 2019 Hvad med teaterhistorien? (What about Theatre History?) Contributor
