= Beskin =

Beskin is a surname. Notable people with the surname include:

- Beth Beskin (born 1959), American politician
- Emmanuil Beskin (1877–1940), Russian theatre critic and historian
- Sivan Beskin (born 1976), Israeli poet, translator, and literary editor
