= The Rich Landowner and the Farmhand =

1953 film

- Directed by: Latif Faiziyev; Aleksandr Gintsburg
- Release date: 1953
- Running time: 81 minute
- Country: Soviet Union
- Language: Russian

The Rich Landowner and the Farmhand (Russian: Бай и батрак, romanized: Bay i batrak) is a 1953 Soviet film directed by Latif Faiziyev and Aleksandr Gintsburg.

== Cast ==
- Yayra Abdullaeva
- Gani Agzamov as Domla Imam
- Shukur Burkhanov
- Abid Dshalilov as Salikhbay
- Sora Eshontoraeva as Dzhamilya
- Malik Kayumov as Gafur's friend
- Sharif Kayumov
- Zamira Khidoyatova as Rakhimakhola
- Kudrat Khodzhaev as Head of the uyezd
- Lutfulla Nazrullaev as Holmat
- Nabi Rakhimov as Aleksey
- Zainab Sadriyeva as Poshissim
- Sagdi Tabibullayev as Ellig-bashi
- Dzhura Tadzhiyev
- Amin Turdiyev as Kadurkul-Mingbashi
- Maryam Yakubova as Khondoza

== Bibliography ==
- Prominent Personalities in the USSR. Scarecrow Press, 1968.
