= Pavel Molchanov (actor) =

Soviet actor

- Born: Pavel Stepanovich Molchanov; 14 March 1902; Ivolsk, Gomelsky Uyezd, Mogilev Governorate, Russian Empire
- Died: 24 February 1977 (aged 74); Minsk, Byelorussian SSR, Soviet Union
- Occupations: Actor, theater director

Pavel Stepanovich Molchanov (Belarusian: Павел Сцяпанавіч Малчанаў; 14 March 1902 – 24 February 1977) was a Soviet and Belarusian stage and film actor and theater director. People's Artist of the USSR (1948).

== Filmography ==
- The Unforgettable Year 1919 (1951) – Vladimir Lenin
- The Skylarks are Singing (1953) – Regional committee secretary
- Children of the Partisan (1954) – Sobolev
- Who Laughs Last (1954) – Nikolai Vasilyevich Anikeyev

== Awards and honors ==
- People's Artist of the Byelorussian SSR (1940)
- Stalin Prize, 2nd class (1946)
- People's Artist of the USSR (1948)
- Two Orders of the Red Banner of Labour (1940, 1955)
- Medal "For Valiant Labour in the Great Patriotic War 1941–1945"
- Jubilee Medal "In Commemoration of the 100th Anniversary of the Birth of Vladimir Ilyich Lenin"
