= Nikolai Figurovsky =

- Born: Nikolai Nikolaevich Figurovsky; 7 December 1923; Chukhloma, Kostroma Governorate, USSR
- Died: 14 June 2003 (aged 79); Moscow, Russia
- Occupations: Film director, screenwriter, writer
- Years active: 1948–1984
- Awards: State Hamza Prize

Nikolai Nikolaevich Figurovsky (Russian: Николай Николаевич Фигуровский; 7 December 1923 – 14 June 2003) was a Soviet film director, screenwriter, writer and professor at VGIK. Honored Artist of the Byelorussian SSR (1964).

== Biography ==
Nikolai Figurovsky was born in Chukhloma (modern-day Kostroma Oblast of Russia) into a family of a village schoolteacher Nikolai Mikhailovich Figurovsky who came from a long generation of Russian Orthodox priests. His grandfather Mikhail Ivanovich Figurovsky, a village priest, was arrested and sentenced to death in 1937 during the Great Purge. His brother Yuri Figurovsky (1925—2005), a constructor of radiolocation equipment, served as the head of the Tikhomirov Scientific Research Institute of Instrument Design between 1962 and 1969, while his cousin-uncle Nikolai Alexandrovich Figurovsky (1901—1986) was a prominent Soviet chemist and a professor at the MSU Faculty of Chemistry; he also had family ties with the Russian space scientist Anatoli Blagonravov.

During the 1930s his family moved to the Ternovka village of the Central Black Earth Oblast where he finished the secondary school in 1941. He served in the signal corps during the Great Patriotic War. After the war he entered the director's faculty at VGIK, the course led by Igor Savchenko which he finished in 1951. As a student he played a small part in The Young Guard movie directed by Sergei Gerasimov.

Between 1953 and 1984 he worked at Mosfilm, Belarusfilm, Uzbekfilm, Gorky and Dovzhenko Film Studios, directing six films and writing 30 screenplays. Among his famous works were two movies directed by Lev Kulidzhanov: the 1961 drama When the Trees Were Tall which entered the 1962 Cannes Film Festival and Crime and Punishment (1970) based on the novel by Fyodor Dostoevsky which was selected for the 31st Venice International Film Festival and awarded the Vasilyev Brothers State Prize of the RSFSR in 1971. For the latter Figurovsky also proposed an idea of an extended six- or seven-part TV version to be released simultaneously, but this was too ahead of its time.

He directed another two notable movies at Belarusfilm: the 1954 spy film Children of the Partisan which became the first Belarusian color motion picture and the 1958 war drama The Clock Has Stopped at Midnight (1958) which turned into one of the Soviet box office leaders of 1959 (8th place with 34.8 mln viewers).

In 1970 Figurovsky also headed the screenwriting workshop at VGIK; among his students were the screenwriter Yuri Arabov and the Russian producer, founder of the CTB Film Company Sergey Selyanov. He was the author of two textbooks on screenwriting as well as a novel The Aquarius Sign (1985) about the intelligentsia in the pre-revolutionary Russia. A member of the Union of Soviet Writers since 1962.

He died on 14 June 2003 and was buried at the Vostryakovsky Cemetery in Moscow.

== Family ==
- First wife (1951–1958) — Emma Trifovovna Figurovskaya (née Pavlikova), an economist, also a VGIK graduate. They had a son Yuri Figurovsky (1951—2011) and a daughter Elena Kosheleva (born 1956).
- Second wife (1959–1961) — an actress Rita Ivanovna Gladunko (1929–1996) who left him for Viktor Avdyushko.
- Third wife (1963–2003) — an actress and a writer Valentina Pavlovna Kutsenko (born 1930). They had a son Nikolay Figurovsky (born 1966).

== Selected filmography ==
Year	Title	Original title			
Year	Title	Original title	Director	Screenwriter	Notes
1948	The Young Guard	Молодая гвардия			Actor (Anatoly "Thunderstorm" Popov)
1954	Children of the Partisan	Дети партизана	✓		Co-directed with Lev Golub
1957	Miles of Fire	Огненные вёрсты		✓	
1958	The Clock Has Stopped at Midnight	Часы остановились в полночь	✓	✓	
1960	Spring Thunderstorms	Весенние грозы	✓	✓	
1961	When the Trees Were Tall	Когда деревья были большими		✓	
1961	Mission	Командировка		✓	
1967	Spring on the Oder	Весна на Одере		✓	
1969	Crime and Punishment	Преступление и наказание		✓	Actor (Koch)
1973	Moscow-Cassiopeia	Москва — Кассиопея			actor (journalist)
1975	Sokolovo	Соколово		✓	
1984	Reporting from the Line of Fire	Репортаж с линии огня		✓	
