= Aleksandr Gintsburg =

Soviet cinematographer (1907–1972)

- Born: Aleksandr Ilyich Gintsburg; 1 March 1907; Rahachow, Mogilev Governorate, Russian Empire
- Died: 10 March 1972 (aged 65); Moscow, Soviet Union
- Occupations: Cinematographer, film director
- Years active: 1928–1970

Aleksandr Ilyich Gintsburg (Russian: Александр Ильич Гинцбург; 1 March 1907 – 10 March 1972) was a Soviet cinematographer and film director. He graduated from the Leningrad Phototechnicum in 1927 and from the Leningrad Electrotechnical Institute in 1934.

== Filmography ==
=== Cinematographer ===
- Counterplan (1932; together with Zhozef Martov and Vladimir Rapoport)
- Komsomolsk (1938)
- Member of the Government (1939)
- Valery Chkalov (1941)
- His Name Is Sukhe-Bator (1942)
- Two Soldiers (1943)
- It Happened in the Donbas (1945)
- Private Aleksandr Matrosov (1947)
- They Have a Motherland (1949)
- The Skylarks are Singing (1953)
- Who Laughs Last (1954)
- Cinderella (1960; also co-screenwriter)

=== Film director ===
- The Rich Landowner and the Farmhand (1953; together with Latif Fayziyev)
- The Hyperboloid of Engineer Garin (1965; also co-screenwriter)

== Awards and honours ==
- Order of the Badge of Honour (23 May 1940)
- Order of the Polar Star (Mongolia) (1942; for the film His Name Is Sukhe-Bator)
- Honored Artist of the Byelorussian SSR (1955)
- Honoured Worker of the Arts Industry of the RSFSR (1969)
