= Children of the Partisan =

- Russian: Дети партизана
- Directed by: Nikolai Figurovsky; Lev Golub
- Written by: Grigoriy Koltunov
- Starring: Viktor Komissarov; Natalya Zashchipina; Pavel Volkov; Pavel Molchanov; L. Mozolevskaya; Oleg Zhakov; Pavel Shpringfeld
- Cinematography: Andrey Bulinskiy
- Music by: Dmitri Lukas; Gavriil Popov
- Release date: 1954
- Running time: 83 minute
- Country: Soviet Union

Children of the Partisan (Russian: Дети партизана) is a 1954 Soviet spy film directed by Nikolai Figurovsky and Lev Golub.

== Plot ==
Young Suvorov cadet Mihas, whose father heroically died in the war, visits his grandfather, Yakub, a forester living in a region once marked by partisan battles against German forces. As they explore the forest and its history, they cross paths with a nearby geological base, home to Glushka, a guide secretly working for foreign intelligence. Glushka photographs classified maps and hides the film, which is accidentally discovered by siblings Grechny. When Mihas and the others try to alert the authorities, Glushka, desperate to protect his treacherous past and present, attempts to lead them into a deadly swamp. With the help of Yakub, the children are rescued, and Glushka is apprehended and handed over to state security officials.

== Cast ==
- Viktor Komissarov as young partisan Mihas
- Natalya Zashchipina
- Pavel Volkov
- Pavel Molchanov
- L. Mozolevskaya
- Oleg Zhakov
- Pavel Shpringfeld
- Grigoriy Shpigel
- Ekaterina Savinova
- Vladimir Balashov
- L. Timofeyeva
- Ya. Zashtoft
- Yu. Pashkin
- Ye. Buzuk
- V. Marsikov
- G. Sudnik
