= Liliya Stepanovna Drozdova =

Soviet actress Liliya Stepanovna Drozdova in the 1964 film Sumka, polnaya serdets.

Liliya Stepanovna Drozdova (June 12, 1927 – July 5, 2011), also known as Lilia Drozdova, was an actress in the Soviet Union, awarded the title People's Artist of the RSFSR. Her career included both cinema and theatre. She married Soviet conductor Israel Borisovich Gusman.

== Film career ==
Drozdova was born in Baýramaly in the Turkmen Soviet Socialist Republic in 1927. She fought in World War II, where she was awarded the Order of the Badge of Honor, the Order of the Patriotic War, and other medals. After the war, in 1950 Drozdova graduated from the Theatre Institute in Minsk, and became an actress. Drozdova performed in a number of roles including The Skylarks are Singing (1953), Sumka, polnaya serdets (1964) with Mikhail Pugovkin, Who Laughs Last (1955), and Nesterka (1955) with Erast Garin.

Drozdova married the Soviet conductor Israel Borisovich Gusman, and settled with him in Nizhny Novgorod.

== Theatre ==
Beginning in 1957, Drozdova began performing at the Gorky Nizhny Novgorod Academic Drama Theater, where her memorial was held after her death. Altogether Drozdova played in over 40 roles during her film and stage career. In 1971 Drozdova was awarded the title People's Artist of the RSFSR. During her long career she also won the Laureate of the USSR State Prize, the title Honored Artist of Belarus, and the Laureate of the NI Sobolshchikov Prize.

== See also ==
- Cinema of the Soviet Union
