= Red Heat (1988 film) =

1988 film directed by Walter Hill

- Theatrical release poster
- Directed by: Walter Hill
- Screenplay by: Walter Hill; Harry Kleiner; Troy Kennedy Martin
- Story by: Walter Hill
- Produced by: Walter Hill; Gordon Carroll Mario Kassar
- Starring: Arnold Schwarzenegger; Jim Belushi; Peter Boyle; Ed O'Ross
- Cinematography: Matthew F. Leonetti
- Edited by: Donn Aron; Carmel Davies; Freeman A. Davies
- Music by: James Horner
- Production company: Carolco Pictures
- Distributed by: Tri-Star Pictures
- Release dates: June 17, 1988 (Los Angeles & New York)
- Running time: 103 minutes
- Country: United States
- Languages: English, Russian
- Box office: $34.9 million (US)

Red Heat is a 1988 American buddy cop action comedy thriller film directed, co-written, and co-produced by Walter Hill and starring Arnold Schwarzenegger as Soviet policeman Ivan Danko, and Jim Belushi as Chicago police detective Art Ridzik. The film centers on the duo who, finding themselves on the same case, work as partners to catch a cunning and deadly Georgian drug kingpin, Viktor Rostavili (Ed O'Ross), who killed Danko's previous partner. Most of the scenes set in the Soviet Union were actually shot in Hungary. Schwarzenegger was paid $8 million for his role in the film. The film is dedicated to the memory of Bennie Dobbins, who died while filming in Austria.

== Plot ==
Moscow City Police officers Ivan Danko and Yuri Ogarkov lead a sting operation against Georgian mafia kingpin Viktor Rostavili, who manages to evade capture and in the ensuing firefight kills Ogarkov, before fleeing to the United States. There, Rostavili is arrested for a minor traffic violation in Chicago and Danko is subsequently dispatched to America to retrieve the felon, under strict orders not to reveal the true nature of Rostavili's extradition.

Upon arriving in Chicago, Danko is met by Chicago Police Department detectives Art Ridzik and Max Gallagher. As he is interrogating Rostavili, Danko confiscates a mysterious key from him. While Rostavili is being transported to the airport, the group is ambushed by several men, and Gallagher is shot and killed, allowing Rostavili to escape. Against the wishes of the American authorities, Danko remains in Chicago to apprehend Rostavili, and Ridzik is assigned to be his minder. Through an informant, Danko and Ridzik learn that Rostavili is working with local drug dealers called The Cleanheads under the guidance of imprisoned criminal kingpin Abdul Elijah, to purchase and smuggle cocaine into the Soviet Union. The duo confront Rostavili's American wife, dance school instructor Cat Manzetti, but are led into an ambush where Rostavili demands that Danko return his key, forcing the pair to retreat.

Danko and Ridzik go to the hospital to interrogate one of Rostavili's henchmen who was injured during the earlier ambush, but he is killed by another one of Rostavili's accomplices disguised as a nurse. Danko subsequently shoots and kills the assassin. Ridzik's superior, Commander Lou Donnelly, confiscates Danko's gun, as he is not licensed to carry one in the United States, and orders him to cease the investigation. Ridzik, who still wants to avenge his partner's murder, secretly gives Danko his spare gun. Manzetti is then murdered by Rostavili.

Returning to his hotel, Danko is attacked by Rostavili's men. While Danko kills them off, Rostavili sneaks into his room and steals the key. Ridzik takes Danko to visit a locksmith, where they match the key to ones produced for lockers at a bus terminal. Rostavili uses the key to retrieve his drug shipment, and steals an empty bus just as Danko and Ridzik arrive. Chasing him in another bus, Danko and Ridzik cause Rostavili to crash into an oncoming freight train. As Rostavili crawls out of the wreckage, he kills the engineer, and is killed by Danko in the process. Later, Ridzik takes Danko to the airport. As a token of their new friendship, they exchange wristwatches. Danko tells Ridzik they are policemen, not politicians, so it is okay for them to like each other. The scene closes with Danko saluting while in Red Square in Moscow.

== Cast ==
- Arnold Schwarzenegger as Captain Ivan Danko
- James Belushi as Detective Sergeant Art Ridzik
- Peter Boyle as Commander Lou Donnelly
- Ed O'Ross as Viktor Segdavich Rostavili / Viktor Rosta
- Larry Fishburne as Lieutenant Charlie Stobbs
- Gina Gershon as Catherine "Cat" Manzetti
- Richard Bright as Detective Sergeant Max Gallagher
- J. W. Smith as Salim
- Brent Jennings as Abdul Elijah
- Gretchen Palmer as Hooker
- Pruitt Taylor Vince as Night Clerk
- Michael Hagerty as Pat Nunn
- Brion James as "Streak"
- Kurt Fuller as Detective
- Gloria Delaney as Intern
- Oleg Vidov as Yuri Ogarkov
- Savely Kramarov as Gregor Moussorsky
- Gigi Vorgan as Officer Audrey
- Peter Jason as TV announcer
- Joey D. Vieira as Man at Phone Booth

== Production ==
=== Development and writing ===
The film was based on an original story by Walter Hill. He says he conceived of the idea for Red Heat because he and Arnold Schwarzenegger had long wanted to work together:

I didn't want to do sci-fi and it's tough to use Arnold credibly in an American context with his accent. I thought it would be interesting if he could play a Russian cop in the US. I wanted to do a traditional John Wayne/Clint Eastwood larger-than-life movie. You then ask the question: Will the American audience accept an unapologetic Soviet hero, someone who will not defect at the end of the movie?

According to Schwarzenegger, when Hill approached him he did not have a complete script – he just had the basic premise and the scene in which Danko rips off a henchman's leg to discover it is wooden and contains cocaine. Schwarzenegger agreed to make the movie on the basis of this and Hill's track record, in particular his earlier buddy action comedy 48 Hours.

The wooden leg scene originally came from a script by Harry Kleiner that had been sent to Hill. Hill did not want to do the script but loved the scene and paid Kleiner for it. "I think it's the best scene in the movie", said Hill later. "The movie, after he left Moscow, I never thought was much good, but I thought that was a terrific scene."

Hill says he deliberately chose to tone down the Schwarzenegger persona, making him more realistic and less prone to wisecracks. Hill:

I had confidence in him as an actor. I didn't want him just to throw a Volkswagen over a building. Arnold has an ability to communicate that cuts through cultures and countries. They just love to see this guy win. But everyone thinks it's his muscles. It's not that at all: it's his face, his eyes. He has a face that's a throwback to a warrior from the Middle Ages or ancient Greece.

Schwarzenegger says Hill told him to watch Greta Garbo's performance in Ninotchka (1939) "to get a handle on how Danko [his character] should react as a loyal Soviet in the West. I got to learn a little Russian, and it was a role for which my own accent was a plus."

The music score was done by James Horner. "I told James I wanted something like you're in the Olympics and you've just won a gold medal", said Hill. "I wanted something heroic." The second movement ("Philosophers") of Sergei Prokofiev's Cantata for the 20th Anniversary of the October Revolution was used in the opening and closing titles of the film.

Hill says he wanted to use buses rather than cars in the climactic action scene because it would be more interesting. "Also, I thought it was very appropriate for Arnold. He doesn't fit well in cars."

He described the film as "in an odd way, it's a traditional love story between these two guys".

Arnold Schwarzenegger's name in the pseudo-Russian typeface adopted for the titles of Red Heat

The script was constantly rewritten during the shoot. Among the writers who worked on it were Hill himself, Harry Kleiner, Troy Kennedy Martin, Steven Meerson & Peter Krikes, and John Mankiewicz & Daniel Pyne. "You've got to understand that Walter likes to create as he goes along", said a source close to the production. "Also, the project was put together quickly based on an idea of his--a Russian cop in Chicago. There was no script." A spokesman for the Writers Guild said Hill was a member in very good standing: "He does tend to hire a lot of people but he pays well above minimums and we feel he's been quite straightforward about screen credit."

Film title designer Wayne Fitzgerald created a new typeface for the film, a morph of English and Russian alphabets. For example, he removed the bar in "A" so that it imitates the Russian Л (Λ), and flipped letters N and R, so that they coincide with Russian И and Я, respectively.

=== Filming ===
Filming had begun on August 26, 1987; the first half of the opening scene was shot in Budapest's Rudas Thermal Bath. It features a brawl between naked men, including Schwarzenegger. He approved the scene saying that "Whenever the scene calls for nudity and it fits into the movie, I don't mind that. But if it is exploiting the whole idea and is thrown in for no reason, then it bothers me and I stay away from it."

The second half was shot in Austria because Budapest had no snow. The film shot in Moscow for four days, primarily at Red Square, which became possible due to the rapid warm up of the cultural and political relations between the Soviet Union and United States. Despite obtaining permission to film in Moscow, the film crew was unsure about exactly where they could shoot; hence many "Moscow" scenes were eventually filmed in Budapest. For example, Buda Castle was used as the Soviet Ministry of Internal Affairs.

=== Weapons ===
In the film, Danko is using "the best Soviet gun of 9.2 mm caliber designed by Podbyrin". Hill wanted it to be an unusually large and threatening weapon resembling the Walther P38. Tim LaFrance designed the gun at his workshop in San Diego, starting from Desert Eagle as an inspiration; hence the gun was nicknamed the "Hollywood Eagle". After release of the movie, its copies were sold in the United States as "Pobyrin pistol".

As to the weapon of the main villain, Viktor Rostavili, Hill wanted it to be a concealed, mafia-style gun. LaFrance designed it as a modified derringer, which was strapped to a forearm using a spring-based system. The gun was hidden in a sleeve, and slid into the hand after a certain hand movement.

== Music ==
The Cantata for the 20th Anniversary of the October Revolution movement "The Philosophers" was used in the opening and closing titles of the film. The soundtrack for Red Heat is known for Horner reusing motifs from his soundtrack for 48 Hrs. (which would be again recycled to varying degrees in Commando and Another 48 Hrs.). James Horner is infamous for recycling major elements and motifs of previous works as well as those of other composers.

== Release ==
Red Heat opened in Los Angeles and New York on June 17, 1988. It was distributed by TriStar Pictures.

== Reception ==
=== Box office ===
The film opened at the top spot at the box office, it grossed $35 million in the US, but was far outpaced by Schwarzenegger's other comedy film in 1988, Twins.

Schwarzenegger later wrote the film "wasn't the smash I'd expected. Why is hard to guess. It could be that audiences were not ready for Russia, or that my and Jim Belushi's performances were not funny enough, or that the director didn't do a good enough job. For whatever reason, it just didn't quite close the deal."

Walter Hill said the film "did pretty well at the domestic box office but not as well as what we hoped it would do. It was big foreign. It was a very big seller on cassette. Did the movie do poorly, medium or well?"

=== Critical response ===
On Rotten Tomatoes the film has an approval rating of 68% based on reviews from 28 critics, with an average rating of 5.4/10. The site's consensus states: "Red Heat's overreliance on genre formula is bolstered by Walter Hill's rugged direction and a strong touch of humor." On Metacritic the film has a score of 61% based on reviews from 13 critics, indicating "generally favorable reviews". Audiences polled by CinemaScore gave the film an average grade of "B" on an A+ to F scale.

Roger Ebert of the Chicago Sun-Times gave it 3 out of 4, and wrote: "The film is punctuated by violence, a great deal of violence, although most of it is exaggerated comic-book style instead of being truly gruesome. Walking that fine line is a speciality of Hill." Variety gave it a positive review, stating "Schwarzenegger [...] is right on target with his characterization of the iron-willed soldier, and Belushi proves a quicksilver foil.

Hal Hinson of The Washington Post panned the film: "Red Heat is poorly, or even indifferently, made. It's a joyless exercise, and too much angry resignation seeps in for it to be very funny or very entertaining." Film historian Leonard Maltin seemed to agree with Hinson, calling the film "...cheerless and foul-mouthed, with two of the least-appealing characters imaginable as the good guys."

== Other media ==
The film was released for sale on video by International Video Entertainment on December 29, 1988.

=== Video game ===
A video game based on the film was released in 1989, for various computer platforms.
