= Israel Borisovich Gusman =

Soviet conductor and professor of music

Israel Borisovich Gusman (August 18, 1917 – January 29, 2003) was a Soviet conductor and professor of music at the Nizhny Novgorod Conservatory. The son of music critic and victim of the Great Purges Boris Gusman, Israel performed music at the front in Ukraine and Poland during World War II, and later served as musical conductor for the Kharkiv Orchestra and for the Bolshoi Theatre. In 1978, Gusman was awarded the prestigious People's Artist of the RSFSR.

== Early life ==
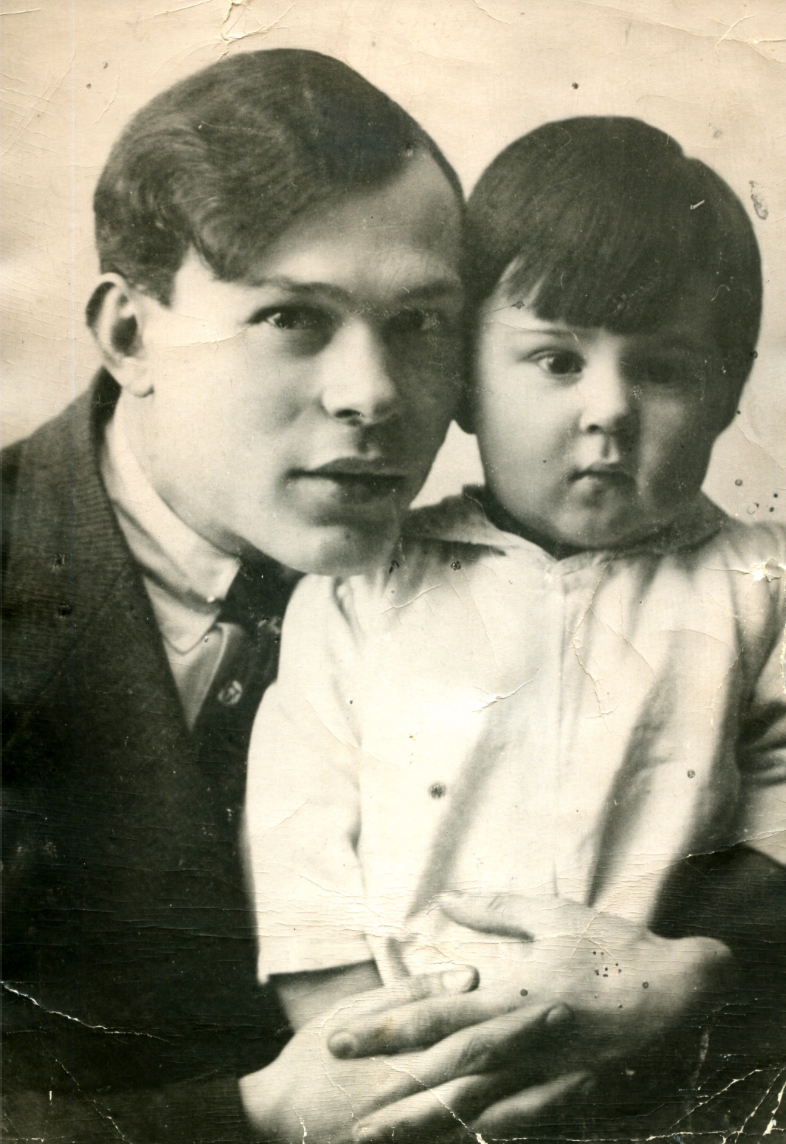
Israel Borisovich Gusman with his father Boris Gusman, c.1918-1920.

Israel Gusman was born on August 18, 1917, in Nizhny Novgorod, the son of the famous music critic Boris Evseevich Gusman. Later, the Gusman family moved to Moscow. In 1931, the young Gusman graduated from the Gnessin School of Music and entered the military conducting department of the Moscow Conservatory. During his studies, he began working in the orchestra of the Musical Theater, and then in the Moscow Philharmonic Orchestra.

== Career ==
=== World War II ===
Gusman served in the Red Army from 1938 to 1940, and was called up again in 1941. In 1943, Gusman was appointed head of the orchestra of the 4th Ukrainian Front. He gave concerts for parts of the front and the population in the Ukraine, Poland, Czechoslovakia and Germany.

=== Kharkiv Orchestra and Bolshoi Theatre ===
In 1946, a year after the war ended, Gusman became a laureate of the All-Union Review of Young Conductors in Leningrad. Beginning in 1947, Gusman headed the Kharkiv Philharmonic Orchestra. After that, he combined performances with teaching duties.

Between 1957 and 1987, Gusman headed the symphony orchestra of the Gorky (now Nizhny Novgorod) Philharmonic. He became one of the main organizers of the USSR's first festival of "Contemporary Music", which has been regularly held since 1962. While at the Gorky, Gusman conducted for pianist Oleg Kagan playing Maurice Ravel, with Sviatoslav Richter in attendance. Mstislav Rostropovich and VT Spivakov studied under Gusman's tutelage.

From 1963 to 1964, Gusman also worked as a conductor at the Bolshoi Theater, conducting in productions of the operas The Queen of Spades and Boris Godunov. Alan Blyth writes that a recording of Gusman conducting Rachmaninoff at the Bolshoi, with Ivan Kozlovsky at the piano, represents "a marvellous over-the-top orchestration and consummate vocal style and expression." As a guest conductor, Gusman performed with the largest symphony ensembles of the USSR (the State Orchestra, the Bolshoi Symphony Orchestra of the Central Television, the Leningrad Philharmonic Orchestra, the state orchestras of Ukraine, Belarus, the Baltic states and others). In addition, Gusman regularly performed outside the USSR.

In 1978, Gusman was awarded the title of People's Artist of the RSFSR. In 1981, he was named a professor at the Gorky Conservatory. In 1996, Gusman was awarded the title of "Honorary Citizen of the Nizhny Novgorod Region."

== Death ==
Gusman died in Nizhny Novgorod on 29 January 2003. He was buried in the Bugrovsky cemetery. The ceremony was attended by Galina Vishnevskaya, Mstislav Rostropovich, Liliya Stepanovna Drozdova (People's Artist of the Russian Federation, Gusman's widow), artistic director of the Nizhny Novgorod Philharmonic Society O. N. Tomina and other well-known cultural figures of Nizhny Novgorod.

In June 2004, a memorial plaque to Gusman was installed on the wall of No. 6 Varvarskaya Street in Nizhny Novgorod. The plaque takes the form of an open piano and is made of black marble. In the upper part of the board, against the background of the staff, there is a bust image of Gusman at the conductor's stand. Below, the text is carved in gold: "In this house from 1970 to 2003 there lived an outstanding conductor and musical figure, People's Artist of Russia, Honorary Citizen of the Nizhny Novgorod Region, Israel Borisovich Gusman."

== Awards ==
- Order of the Patriotic War II degree (1945) - by order of the Armed Forces of the 4th Ukrainian Front No.: 115 / n dated: 04/22/1945, the head of the educational orchestra of the 4th Ukrainian front, captain of the administrative service, Gusman, was awarded the Order of the Patriotic War, 2nd degree for conducting over 100 concerts in the battle formations of troops during the Carpathian operation and personally trained 35 musicians, later sent to the troops.
- Order of the Patriotic War II degree (1985).
- Order of the Red Banner of Labor.
- Medal "For the Defense of Moscow."
- Medal "For the victory over Germany."

== Bibliography ==
- Belyakov V., Blinova V., Bordyug N. Opera and concert activity in Nizhny Novgorod - the city of Gorky. - Gorky, 1980.
- Gusman I.B.// Who is who in the Nizhny Novgorod region. - Nizhny Novgorod, 1998.
