= Boris Gusman =

Soviet film and music critic (born 1892)

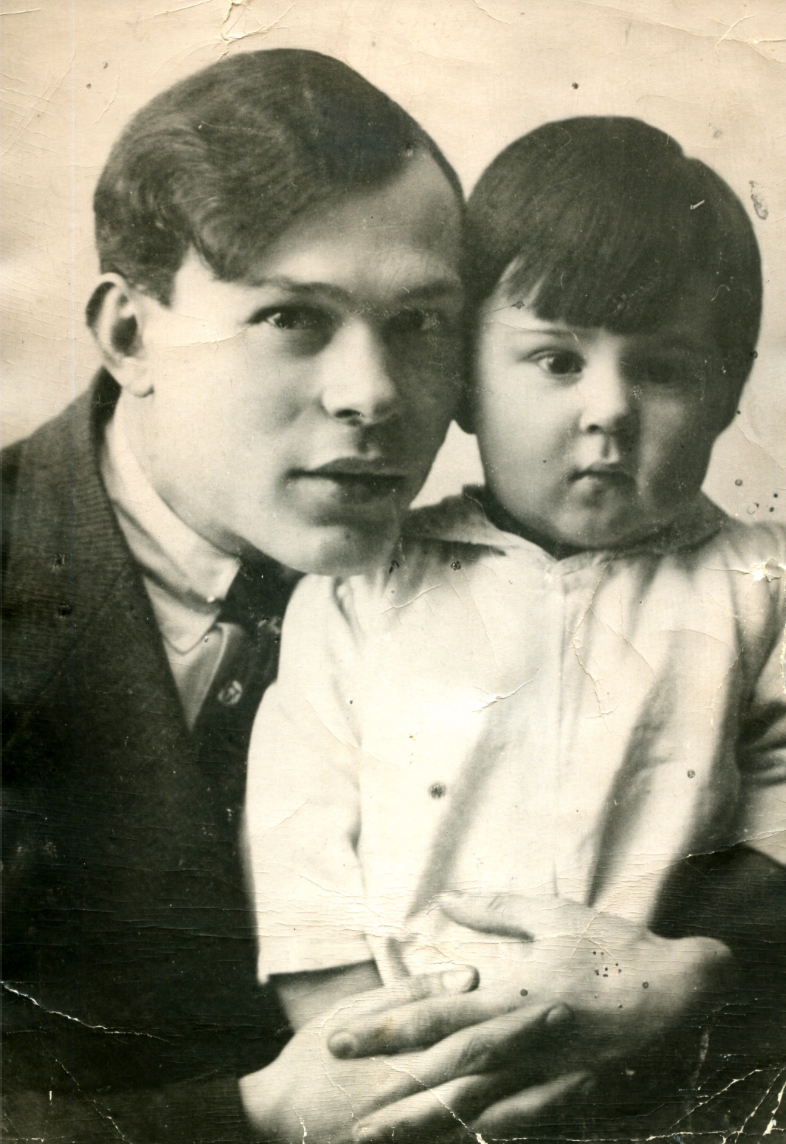
Boris Gusman with his son Israel Borisovich Gusman, c.1918-1920.

Boris Yevseyevich Gusman (16 December 1892 – 3 May 1944) was a Soviet author, screenwriter, theater director, and columnist for Pravda. As deputy director for the Bolshoi Theatre and later director of the Soviet Radio Committee Arts Division, Gusman played an important role in promoting Sergei Prokofiev's music in the USSR and internationally. Gusman was arrested during the Great Purges of the late 1930s, and died in a labor camp in 1944. His son Israel Borisovich Gusman would later become a prominent musical conductor.

== Life ==
=== Pravda and art criticism ===
As a young man Gusman was a violinist and played for the St. Petersburg Symphony Orchestra of the Sheremetev family. Prior to the Russian Revolution and during the First World War, Gusman associated with intellectuals and critics around the Enchanted Wanderer magazine, including Dimitri Kruchkov and Victor Khovin, both members of the Ego-Futurist movement. In 1917 he moved to Nizhny Novgorod to marry the daughter of a merchant, who soon gave birth to their son, Israel Gusman. Gusman also became active in the local Bolshevik branch in Novgorod; he joined the Communist Party in 1918, and by 1920 was named the editor of its newspaper, the Nizhny Novgorod Workers' Leaflet (later the Nizhny Novgorod Commune).

It was in 1921 that Gusman and his family moved to Moscow, where he began writing for Pravda. He was recognized as an important film critic, and from 1923 onwards headed Pravda's theatre section. Gusman rejected arguments among some Soviet filmmakers, associated with the Proletkult movement, that contributing to a new Soviet cinema required abandoning the history of film altogether. Gusman wrote that the new cinema "must be built brick by brick, making use of everything that is healthy about the New World, and that which is good about the old." Gusman responded favorably to candid films pioneered by Dziga Vertov called Kino-Pravda. He described them as "lively… striking… and interesting," but criticized the lack of connection between scenes and the absence of unifying themes.

=== Musical career ===
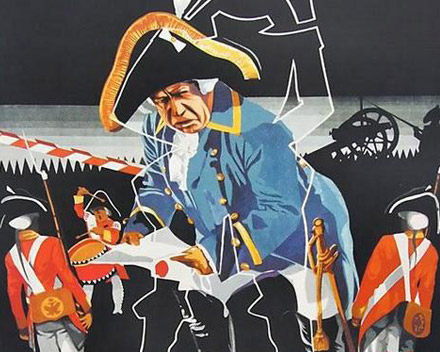
In his work with the Bolshoi Theatre and Soviet Radio, Gusman promoted Prokofiev's musical score for Lieutenant Kijé (1934), a poster for which is shown above.

In 1929 Gusman, as deputy director, led the State Bolshoi Academic Theater's effort to stage Prokofiev's Pas d'Acier with new cast and choreography. Gusman remained with the Bolshoi Theatre through 1930, and in 1933 became head of the arts division of the Soviet Central Radio Administration. Gusman played a central role in working with Prokofiev in the musical and cinematic production of Lieutenant Kijé. Following the success of the film, in 1934 Gusman organized a broadcast concert of the music with Moscow Radio Orchestra.

In 1934, Gusman negotiated a contract between Prokofiev and the All-Union Radio Committee, helping the composer return to Russia. Gusman also offered him a tremendous sum of 25,000 rubles for one of a series of commissioned works: the Cantata for the Twentieth Anniversary of October, to commemorate the October Revolution of 1917. Gusman also commissioned Prokofiev to write a Collective Farm Suite, a Dance Suite, and a suite from the music for Egyptian Nights. Though Gusman remained an important supporter of Prokofiev's music, neither he nor the composer ever witnessed a performance of the Cantata: the work was banned, and both men died before its performance in 1966.

=== Purges and death ===
In 1937, Gusman lost his position as director of the Moscow Radio Orchestra, and was assigned a smaller post at a Tchaikovsky museum in Klin. That same year, Gusman and his wife adopted Svetlana and Yuri Larin, the infant children of Anna Larina and Nikolai Bukharin, who had been arrested. Bukharin was shot in 1938.

Arrested in one of a series of purges targeting Soviet artists and cultural leaders in 1937–38, Gusman was accused of having written ideologically unsound scripts in the past. While initial purges targeted those linked (or accused of links) to Trotskyism, Gusman's arrest came alongside later, wider purges. Gusman's wife was arrested as well. Gusman himself died on May 3, 1944, in Vozhael (Ustvymlag Gulag camp).

Gusman's son Israel survived the purges, and would go on to head the Gorky Philharmonic Symphony Orchestra from 1957 until 1987.

== Filmography ==
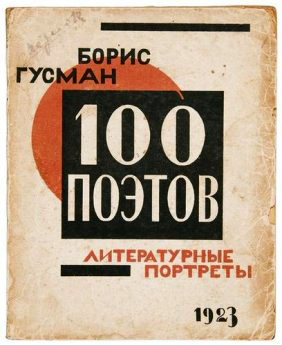
Cover of Gusman's 1923 book, 100 Poets, designed by Mikhail Ksenofontovich Sokolov

- 1928: The Living Corpse, adapted from a story by Leo Tolstoy.
- 1929: Merry Canary, a story about intelligence and espionage.
- 1935: On the Strangeness of Love, a Vaudeville comedy set in Crimea.

== Books ==
- 1923: Literary portraits: one hundred poets (Tver)

== See also ==
- Cinema of the Soviet Union
- Kino-Pravda
- Music of the Soviet Union
- Socialist realism
