= Emmanuil Beskin =

Emmanuil Martynovich Beskin (1877 - 20 January 1940) was a theatre critic and historian in the Russian Empire and later the Soviet Union. He wrote over 2,000 articles and reviews.

He was educated as a lawyer, but became involved in theatre criticism in the early 1900s writing for the magazines "Ramp", "Ramp and Actor", and in Teatral'riaia gazeta (Theatre Gazette). He provided a series of "Moscow Letters" for Theatre and Art from 1909 to 1913. From 1921 to 1922 he was editor of the newspaper "Theater Moscow". He was chief editor of Rabis from 1927 - 1934.

He contributed the essay “On the new ways” to the 1922 theatre criticism anthology, On Theatre

== Books ==
- The History of the Russian Theatre, (1928)
- A. I. Sumbatov-Yuzhin, (1936)
- M. N. Yermolova (1853-1928), (1936)
