= Mikhail Sokolov =

Russian painter

- Born: Mikhail Ksenofontovich Sokolov; September 6, 1885; Yaroslavl, Russian Empire
- Died: September 29, 1947 (aged 62); Moscow, Soviet Union
- Education: Yaroslavl Art School; Stroganov Moscow State Academy of Arts and Industry
- Known for: Painting
- Movement: Russian avant-garde Graphics; Illustration

Mikhail Ksenofontovich Sokolov (Russian: Михаи́л Ксенофо́нтович Соколо́в; 1885-1947) was a Russian painter, graphic artist and illustrator active in Soviet Avant-garde arts activity.

== Biography ==
Sokolov studied at the Yaroslavl Art School and from 1904 to 1907 he studied at the Stroganov Moscow State Academy of Arts and Industry. He then spent two years in the Imperial Baltic Fleet. His first exhibition was through participation in the Mir iskusstva (World of Art) exhibition of 1917. This showed the influence of the French art from the late 19th and early 20th century.

Sokolov taught at the studios in Tver (1920-1922) whilst also taking on graphic work. This included work for Тверской издательство (Tver Publishing House), which was privatised following the introduction of the New Economic Policy.

Prior to 1938, he worked as a teacher at various places including the Institute of Advanced Training of Artists and Designers. However in 1938, Sokolov put on trial and sentenced in march to seven years in Siberian labour camps. He was released early in 1943 owing to sickness and settled in Rybinsk.

== Gallery ==
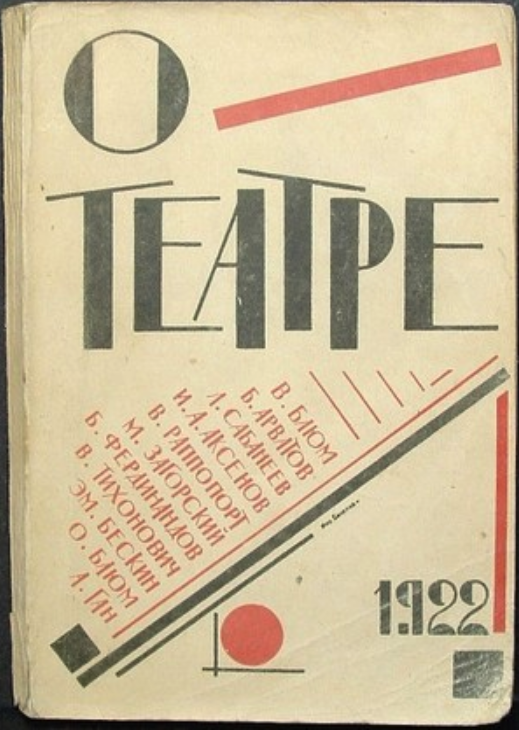
Book cover (1923): O Teatre (Tver) anthology

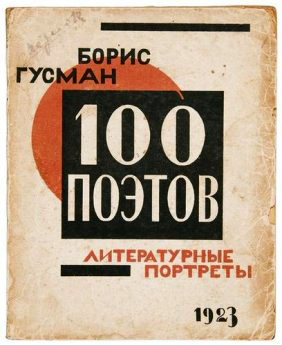
Book cover (1923): Literary Portraits: One Hundred Poets (Tver) by Boris Gusman

== Personal life ==
He was married three times: to Nadezhda Shtemberg from 1917 to 1919, to Marina Baskakova from 1927 to 1935, to Nadezhda Vereshchagina-Rozanova in 1947.
