= On Theatre =

Russian book

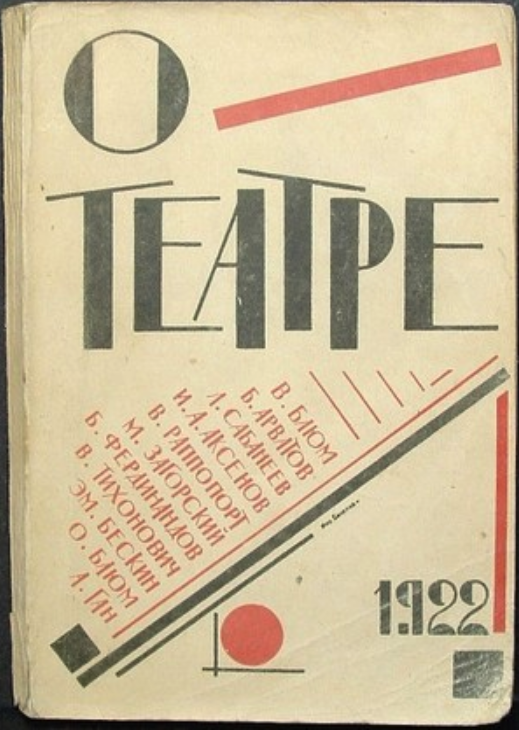
- Cover artist: Mikhail Ksenofontovich Sokolov
- Language: Russian
- Genre: Non-fiction
- Publisher: Тверской издательство; (Tver Publishing House)
- Publication place: Russia

On Theatre was a Russian book published to celebrate the fifth anniversary of the Russian Revolution. It was published by Тверской издательство (Tver Publishing House) based in Tver. This publishing house had been recently privatised following the introduction of the New Economic Policy.

The publishers remarked on the volume:

"When publishing this collection, the Publishing House was guided by the need to start summarising those experiments and achievements in the field of theatre, which have marked the years after Great October.

"The old 'foundations' and 'traditions' of the theatre have been destroyed. Carefully protected by academisation, they are at best of interest for the museum and archive interest and cannot satisfy the creative, seeking spirit of the proletariat.

"New theatrical theory, the construction is in favour. Many bold experiments have been done in recent years. Still, all this is still in the stage of fermentation and research.

"But one thing is clear in any case — the theatre of RSFSR is the theatre of the present and the future, but not the past (it can borrow only those forms it needs from the past). The creators of the modern theatre can only be people who have sociologically broken with the past.

"It is this sociological break with the past, the introduction to the theatre of a single great movement along the path of the proletarian dictatorship to socialism - and this is the common platform of the authors of this collection.

"In different ways, the authors strive towards a common goal - the ideological break with the bourgeois theatre, the destruction of theatrical mysticism, the formulation of the scientific construction of the theatre, in consonance with our time and our aspirations."

== Contents ==
- Vladimir Ivanovich Blum (1877 - 1941) - “On the Pass”
- Emmanuil Beskin (1877 - 1940) - “On the new ways”
- Boris Alekseevich Ferdinand (1889 - 1959) - “Theatre Today”
- Aleksei Gan (1895 - 1942) - "The Struggle for Mass Action"
- Ivan Alexandrovich Aksenov (1884 - 1935) - “Theatre on the Road”
- Valentin Vladimirovich Tikhonovich (18?? - 19??) - “Proletarian Theatre”
- Mikhail Borisovich Zagorsky (1885 - 1951) - “Theater and spectator of the epoch of revolution”
- Boris Arvatov (1896 - 1940) - “Theatre as a Production”
- Oscar Blum (18?? - 19??) - "Actor and Director”
- Victor Romanovich Rappaport (1889 - 1943) - “Theatrical Theories and Modern Science”
- Leonid Sabaneyev (1881 - 1968) - "Music, the stage and the contemporary problem of art"
