= Lev Razgon =

Soviet writer (1908–1999)

- Лев Эммануилович Разгон
- Born: Lev Emmanuilovich (Mendelevich) Razgon; 1 April 1908; Horki, Horki Raion, Mogilev Governorate, Belarus, Russian Empire
- Died: 8 September 1999 (aged 91); Moscow, Russia
- Education: Moscow State Pedagogical Institute
- Occupation: Writer
- Spouse(s): Oksana Glebovna Bokiy, Rika Efremovna Berg
- Writing career
- Notable awards: Andrei Sakharov Prize for Writer's Civic Courage

Lev Emmanuilovich Razgon (Russian: Лев Эммануи́лович Разго́н; 1 April 1908 – 8 September 1999) was a Soviet Russian journalist, writer, a prisoner of the Gulag from 1938 to 1942 and again from 1950 to 1955 and, latterly, a human rights activist.

Razgon was born in Belorussia to the family of Mendel Abramovich Razgon and Glika Izrailevna Shapiro. In the 1920s they moved to Moscow and in 1932, he graduated from the history faculty of the Moscow State Pedagogical Institute.

His career before his arrest in 1938 was in great measure due to his marrying into the new Soviet elite and, in particular, two men: his wife Oksana's father Gleb Boky, a high-ranking NKVD officer, and her step-father Ivan Moskvin, a leading figure in the Central Committee.

Later in life, Razgon fell into the category of Gulag detainees who rejoined the Communist Party after their release. He did not resign from the Party until 1988.

== Life before arrest ==
After moving to Moscow Razgon met and married Oksana, the daughter of Gleb Boky and step-daughter of Ivan Moskvin, who were influential friends and patrons until their own arrest in 1937.

At Ivan Moskvin's apartment, for instance, Razgon met the future head of the NKVD Nikolai Yezhov. With a pass supplied by Moskvin he attended the 17th Congress of the All-Union Communist Party (Bolsheviks), the "1934 Congress of Victors" at which, he reports, Stalin received many more negative votes than Sergei Kirov when the Congress members voted to re-appoint members to the Central Committee.

Razgon's account of these years began to appear in printed form during perestroika, serialised in issues of the Ogonyok weekly. Subsequently, they were published as a book True Stories (Nepridumannoe, 1988), and it was only in a separate and slightly later publication in the Ogonyok library series that Razgon first admitted he had worked for Gleb Boky's organisation.

=== Lev Razgon and the NKVD ===
A 2005 handbook detailing The Most Secret Relatives of Soviet writers and other public figures summarises Razgon's biography as follows: a Pioneer leader, he then began to work for the Central Bureau of Young Pioneers and as an editor at Molodaya gvardiya publishers; he worked for the NKVD until Gleb Boky's arrest; and went back to the Children's Literature publishing house (Detizdat).

While admitting Boky's bloody past, in Petrograd in 1918 and in Central Asia during the 1920s, Razgon describes the Special Department as a counter-intelligence operation rather than anything to do with arrests and interrogations. "Its job was to protect the secrets of the Soviet State and try to find out those of others," he wrote, and suggested it had some parallel in its functions and purpose with the US National Security Agency.

On 18 April 1938, Razgon was arrested and spent the next 17 years in prisons, camps, and exile. He began his service in Ustvymlag, Komi ASSR.

== Life in the Gulag ==
Razgon's account of life (and death) in the Gulag in True Stories (1988) is one of the most detailed sources there is: it contains a unique chapter, for instance, describing various camp bosses he observed and worked under. There are almost as many references to his memoirs in Anne Applebaum's Gulag: A history of the Soviet Camps (2003), as there are to Alexander Solzhenitsyn's Gulag Archipelago (1974).

Razgon describes the respect he received for being the son-in-law of Gleb Boky (shot in November 1937) and an existence in which he usually worked in the office as a norm-setter, not out in the forest with the rest of the convicts, felling trees. At one point in his memoirs he takes issue with Solzhenitsyn and speaks out on behalf of "trusties" like himself, and the camp medical service, who together made things easier for ordinary inmates.

A less flattering account has been offered by Anton Antonov-Ovseyenko, Razgon's junior by 11 years. Antonov-Ovseyenko also spent time in the Gulag; his famous Bolshevik/Red Army father was executed during the Great Purges of the late 1930s. Razgon was an "honoured provocateur", in Antonov-Ovseyenko's words, and was arrested and sentenced together with a group of "too assiduous torturers"; he did not push a wheelbarrow in a camp, he did not fell wood in the taiga, and he was not dying of starvation. Instead he worked as a norm setter, and helped the camp director and its "godfather", i.e. the supervisor of the NKVD department for internal security.

In 1955, Razgon was released.

== Return to Moscow ==
Unlike many others, Razgon did not have to wait long for rehabilitation, after which he could settle in Moscow again and resume his writing. Between the 1960s and 1980s (see Publications, below) he published a number of books while privately writing about his years in the Gulag.

The memoirs were not sent abroad to be published during the Brezhnev years nor did they circulate in samizdat, unlike the memoirs of Evgenia Ginzburg or Olga Adamova-Sliozberg. It is evident, nevertheless, that Roy Medvedev had access to what he had written and incorporated some incidents they describe in his Let History Judge, first published in an English edition in 1972.

Razgon waited until Gorbachev became General Secretary of the Communist Party of the Soviet Union before beginning to publish excerpts from his memoirs in a variety of Soviet literary magazines. In 1988, the Ogonyok magazine published Lev Razgon's memoir about "The President's Wife", an "unbelievable but true" story about the wife of the first Soviet's head of state Mikhail Kalinin, Ekaterina Kalinina, who was imprisoned in the labour camps of the far northern Komi: this was confirmation that Stalin made hostages of his closest colleagues' family members (another was Yelena Zhemchuzhina, the wife of Vyacheslav Molotov) to ensure they behaved as he wanted.

=== Encounter with an executioner ===
Those arrested during the Great Purges of the late 1930s were either "first category arrests", i.e. listed for execution, or "second category arrests", listed for imprisonment and exile.

Some of those in the 1st category were tortured to secure confessions that they were secret Trotskyists, agents of foreign powers and so on. After show trials of the kind mounted in Moscow from 1936 to 1938, the accused were shot. Boky's confession was not good enough and, according to NKVD records examined by Razgon in the late 1980s, his father-in-law was shot on 15 November 1937 shortly after being found guilty.

Others were executed almost immediately. In his chapter about "Niyazov", whom he met in 1977 at Moscow's Cardiology Institute, Razgon tells what that former NKVD executioner had to say concerning the hundreds and thousands of victims of such operations, despatched with a bullet to the back of the head and buried at concealed locations all over the Soviet Union.

=== Memorial and the Clemency Commission ===
In 1988, Razgon and many others (e.g. Bulat Okudzhava) left the CPSU. For a while he joined the Italian Radical Party.

In 1989, Razgon was among the founders of the Memorial Society. He was also a member of the International PEN Club.

With many other prominent writers Razgon joined the Clemency Commission created by Boris Yeltsin and worked to secure the commutation of all death sentences to terms of imprisonment, arguing for the abolition of death penalty in Russia and reform of the judicial system.

In October 1993, during the confrontation between President Yeltsin and the Supreme Soviet, Razgon was one of the signatories of the Letter of Forty-Two.

== Publications ==
- Shestaja Stantsiya (The Sixth Station, 1964)
- Odin God i Vsya Zhizn (One Year and All Life, 1973)
- Sila Tyazhesti (Force of Gravity, 1979)
- Zrimoe Znanie (Visible Knowledge, 1983)
- Moskovskie Povesti (The Moscow Stories, 1983),

=== Glasnost years ===
- Nepridumannoye (True Stories, 1988),
- Pered Raskrytymi Delami (Before Opened Case Files Cases, 1991),

=== The 1990s ===
- Plen v Svoyom Otechestve (A Captive in One's Homeland, 1994), an expanded version of True Stories
- Pozavchera i Segodnya (The Day before Yesterday and Today, 1995)

=== In translation ===
Razgon's memoirs (Непридуманное, Nepridumannoe, 1988) have been translated into French, Italian and English and five other languages

- La vie sans lendemains, Horay: Paris, 1991 (in French)
- (in Italian)
- True Stories, published in US (1995) and in the UK (1997)
- Sin inventar NADA. El Polvo Anonimo del Gulag, 2013 (in Spanish) (Spanish Edition)
- Χωρίς Επινοήσεις, Athens 1990 (in Greek)

== Awards ==
In 1998, to mark Razgon's 90th birthday, he was awarded the Order of Merit for the Fatherland of the fourth class for his personal contribution to Russian literature and his active participation in the country's democratic reforms. Razgon also received the Andrei Sakharov Prize for Writer's Civic Courage.
