= Ivan Nikishov =

Soviet General

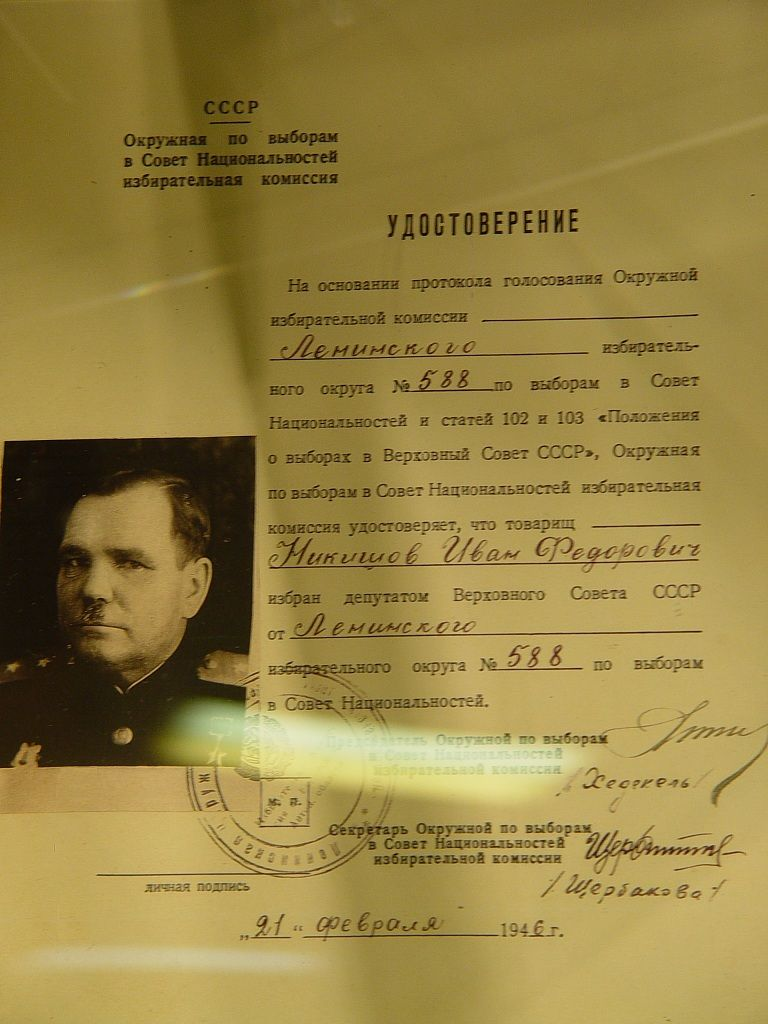
Certificate of a deputy of the Supreme Soviet of the USSR, issued by I. F. Nikishov 21.02.1946 From the exposition of the Magadan Regional Museum of Local Lore.

Ivan Fyodorovich Nikishov (Russian: Ива́н Фёдорович Ники́шов; 10 September 1894 – 5 August 1958) was a Soviet NKVD Lieutenant General and director of Dalstroy.

== Biography ==
Nikishov was born in Varkino, in the Vologda Governorate of the Russian Empire in a peasant family. He volunteered for the Red Army in 1918 during the Civil War and joined the Communist Party in 1919. He entered a career in the NKVD and became its head for Azerbaijan in 1937, where he directed the purges. In 1938 and 1939 he was the head of the NKVD at Khabarovsk.

In 1940 Nikishov was appointed director of the Dalstroy organization. At Magadan he divorced his wife and married the commandant of the women's camp, Alexandra Gridassova (rus.). The couple established a life of luxury in the Siberian wilderness replete with servants, cooks, chauffeurs, and a cultural brigade for entertainment. Nikishov increased the gold production from the Kolyma mines. His difficulties in securing supplies for his operation were solved when the Lend-Lease program went into effect; he could divert cargo delivered to Magadan for services in the Gulag. Ships of the Dalstroy fleet were sent to the United States for overhaul and repair for their duty to transport prisoners to the Gulag. In 1944, Nikishov and NKVD general Goglidze were successful in presenting to Henry A. Wallace, the American Vice President, a sanitized version of the Dalstroy enterprise. On 20 January 1944, he was awarded the title Hero of Socialist Labour for increasing the production of raw materials in Dalstroy.

Investigations for abuse of state funds and debauchery were initiated and he retired in 1948. He died in his bath in 1956.

Nikishov was a candidate member of the Central Committee of the Communist Party of the Soviet Union from 1939 to 1952.

== Awards and honors ==
- Hero of Socialist Labour (1944)
- Four Orders of Lenin (1940, 1943, 1944, 1945)
- Two Orders of the Red Banner (1936, 1944)
- Order of Kutuzov, 1st class (1945)
- Order of the Red Banner of Labour (1941)
