= Ustvymlag =

Gulag labor camp

Coordinates: 62.8478°N 51.3275°E

Ustvymlag or Ust-Vym corrective labor camp (Russian: Устьвымлаг, Усть-Вымский ИТЛ) was a Gulag labor camp in the Soviet Union, Komi ASSR, with the headquarters in the village of Ust-Vym, later moved to Vozhayol. It was created from a detachment of Ukhtpechlag (Ухтпечлаг) on August 16, 1937. After the dismantling of the Gulag system, it remained a corrective labor camp of the Soviet penal system until 1960.

The main industry of the camp was logging and related production. The maximal occupation of 24,245, registered in 1943.

In 1942, a labor detachment of Volga Germans "mobilized for labor" was housed in the camp. Since 1945, it also detained prisoners of war.

It should not be confused with the earlier Ust-Vym corrective labor camp (1931-1932) used to man the constructions of the Syktyvkar-Ukhta road and Pinyug-Syktyvkar railway.

== Notable inmates ==
- Jānis Alksnis, Soviet military commander and military scientist
- Georgy Astakhov, Soviet diplomat
- Dāvids Beika, Soviet Latvian activist and intelligence officer
- Valenting Gudievsky, Russian criminal boss, "thief in law"
- Boris Gusman, Soviet author, screenplay writer, theater director, and columnist for Pravda
- Ekaterina Kalinina, wife of Mikhail Kalinin, the chair of the Presidium of the Supreme Soviet and formally the head of the Soviet state
- Bishop Veniamin (Milov)
- Archbishop Varlaam (Pikalov)
- Lev Razgon, Soviet journalist and activist
- Georgy Statsevich, Soviet functionary
- Mikhail Viktorov, Soviet NKVD functionary
