= Rostislav Zakharov =

Soviet and Russian choreographer, ballet dancer and opera director

Rostislav Vladimirovich Zakharov (Russian: Ростислав Владимирович Захаров; September 7, 1907 – January 15, 1984) was a Soviet and Russian choreographer, ballet dancer and opera director. He was a professor at the Russian Institute of Theatre Arts (GITIS) in Moscow (1946–1983). Zakharov was awarded the Stalin Prize twice and designated the People's Artist of the USSR (1969).

Zakharov is best known for choreographing The Fountain of Bakhchisaray with music by Boris Asafiev (1934) and Cinderella (1945). The art of choreographer Zakharov made up an entire epoch in the history of the Soviet and world ballet and opera theater. As a choreographer Zakharov had his own unique philosophy of dance art. He influenced the art of ballet, making it a truly realistic and democratic art. At the beginning of the 20th century, the ballet theater began to move away from romanticism and get closer to the great world classical literature. Zakharov was at the origins of a new ballet direction –ballet drama. Due to his deep knowledge of Konstantin Stanislavsky theater system, choreographer Zakharov created a new ballet performance where high dance imagery and classical dance techniques were closely combined with great acting skills. Zakharov's ballet performances revealed the performing talents of Galina Ulanova, Marina Semenova, Maya Plisetskaya, Konstantin Sergeev, Mikhail Gabovich and many generations of world-famous ballet stars.

== Biography ==
Zakharov was born on September 7, 1907, in the city of Astrakhan on the Volga River. In 1926 he graduated from the Leningrad Choreographic School (currently Agrippina Vaganova Academy of Russian Ballet, St. Petersburg). Graduated from the Leningrad Theater Institute (directing department in 1932, directing department in 1948 completed as an externship). After graduating from the Leningrad Choreographic School, he was sent with a group of dancers to Ukraine to promote ballet art. In 1926–1929 he was a soloist and choreographer at both Kharkiv and Kyiv ballet. In 1927, while working in the theater, he organized a ballet studio in Kiev, where he taught the basics of classical, duet and folk dance. On the basis of the studio, he created and staged his first one-act ballet "The Sailor's Dream". It was followed by a ballet based on Ricardo Drigo's Harlequinade and later a concert program with numbers from Faust and Prince Igor. In 1929 he staged the ballet Don Quixote. Zakharov successfully combined his studies at the Leningrad Theater Institute Leningrad Theatre Institute (until 1932). During the period of 1932–1936 Zakharov became a choreographer of the Theater of Opera and Ballet named after S.M. Kirov Saint Petersburg (now the Mariinsky Theater), where in 1934 he staged his most famous ballet The Fountain of Bakhchisarai to the music of Boris Asafiev based on the poem by Alexander Pushkin. It was the ballet The Fountain of Bakhchisarai that marked the beginning of the Soviet choreographic Pushkiniana and opened the world to a new method of directorial work in ballet - “drama ballet”. At present, the ballet The Fountain of Bakhchisarai is performed in many theaters in Russia and around the world. Also on the stage of the theater named after S.M. Kirov he staged ballets Lost Illusions by Boris Asafiev (1936), The Red Poppy and The Bronze Horseman (1949) by Reinhold Glière, dances in the operas Khovanshchina by Modest Mussorgsky (1933) and Huguenots to Giacomo Meyerbeer’s music (1935).

In 1936–1956 he became the chief choreographer and opera director of the Bolshoi Theater, where he staged ballets: The Fountain of Bakhchisarai (new version 1936), Prisoner of the Caucasus (1938) and The Lady-Peasant (1946) by B. Asafiev, Cinderella (1945) by S. Prokofiev, Don Quixote (1940) by L. Minkus, Taras Bulba (1940) by V. Soloviev-Sedoy. The legendary dance "Gopak", which has been performed with great success on stages of the world's best theaters for over 80 years, is a variation of Ostap from the ballet Taras Bulba.

Zakharov did not confine his work to choreography, also he staged operas at the Bolshoi Theater, combining the work of choreographer with staging and directing work: Ruslan and Lyudmila by M. Glinka (1937; 1956 Prague), Carmen by J. Bizet (1943), Wilhelm Tell by G. Rossini (1943). Opera Carmen directed by Zakharov had been performed at the Bolshoi Theater for over 40 years, and in 1959 the role of Jose was performed by the great Italian tenor Mario Del Monaco. Zakharov staged dances in operas - the Polish Ball scene in the opera Ivan Susanin by M. Glinka, Naina's Gardens in the opera Ruslan and Lyudmila by M. Glinka, as well as War and Peace by S. Prokofiev, Aida by G. Verdi.

From 1945 to 1947 Zakharov was the director and artistic director of the Moscow Choreographic School (now the Bolshoi Ballet Academy. Moscow). In 1946 Zakharov founded the world's first choreography department for ballet dancers. After he left staging work, Zakharov devoted himself to teaching. He became a permanent head of the choreography department of the State Institute of Theater Arts GITIS (Moscow), in 1951 he received a title of professor. He taught students the art of choreography. Among his students were figures from the Soviet and foreign ballet theater: Igor Smirnov, Alexander Lapauri, Natalia Konyus, Mikhail Lavrovsky, Andrey Petrov, Dmitry Bryantsev, Anatoly Borzov, Jiri Blazek and Marilena Totova (Czechoslovakia), Nadezhda Kiradzhieva (Bulgaria), Vera Bokkadoro (France), etc. Since 1947, he regularly participated in the Worldwide Festivals of Youth and Students as chief ballet master and was one of the leaders of the Soviet delegation. Zakharov staged ballet and opera performances in theaters in Prague, Zagreb, Budapest, Cairo and many others.

Zakharov was repeatedly invited to the Finnish National Opera in Helsinki and staged his world famous ballets Cinderella by S. Prokofiev (1957) and The Fountain of Bakhchisarai by B. Asafiev (1956; 1972 new version) where the stars of the Finnish classical ballet Margaretha von Bahr and Ulrika Hallberg brilliantly danced.

Zakharov was an author of articles and books such as The Art of a Choreographer(1954), Notes of a Choreographer (1976), A Word about Dance (1977), Composition of a Dance (1983;1989), etc.

Zakharov died in Moscow on January 15, 1984. He is buried at the Vagankovsky Cemetery in Moscow.

== Family ==
Wife - Maria Gennadievna Smirnova (1903–1983), Ballerina and choreographer. In 1926–1929 Maria Smirnova was a soloist at both Kharkiv and Kyiv ballet. Worked with her husband, Rostislav Zakharov, as the ballet tutor and the teacher over his ballet productions.

Son - Vladimir Rostislavovich Zakharov (1931–1989), Ballet dancer, Choreographer. Graduate from the Moscow academic choreographic school (Bolshoi Ballet Academy), the ballet soloist of the Bolshoi Theater, Moscow.

Granddaughter - Olga Vladimirovna Zakharova.

Voronezh Choreographic School & Bolshoi Ballet Academy.

Choreographer, Ballet teacher, Art Manager.

As the ballet teacher and an assistant of choreographer Andrei Petrov worked at the Kremlin Ballet Theatre with the famous worldwide ballet stars, great dancers, choreographers, composers and artists – Yury Grigorovich, Vladimir Vasiliev, Yekaterina Maksimova, Nina Timofeeva, Vladislav Agafonnikov, Boris Messerer, Viktor Volsky.

== See also ==
- List of Russian ballet dancers
