= Kandrat Krapiva =

Belarusian writer, playwright, and activist (1896–1991)

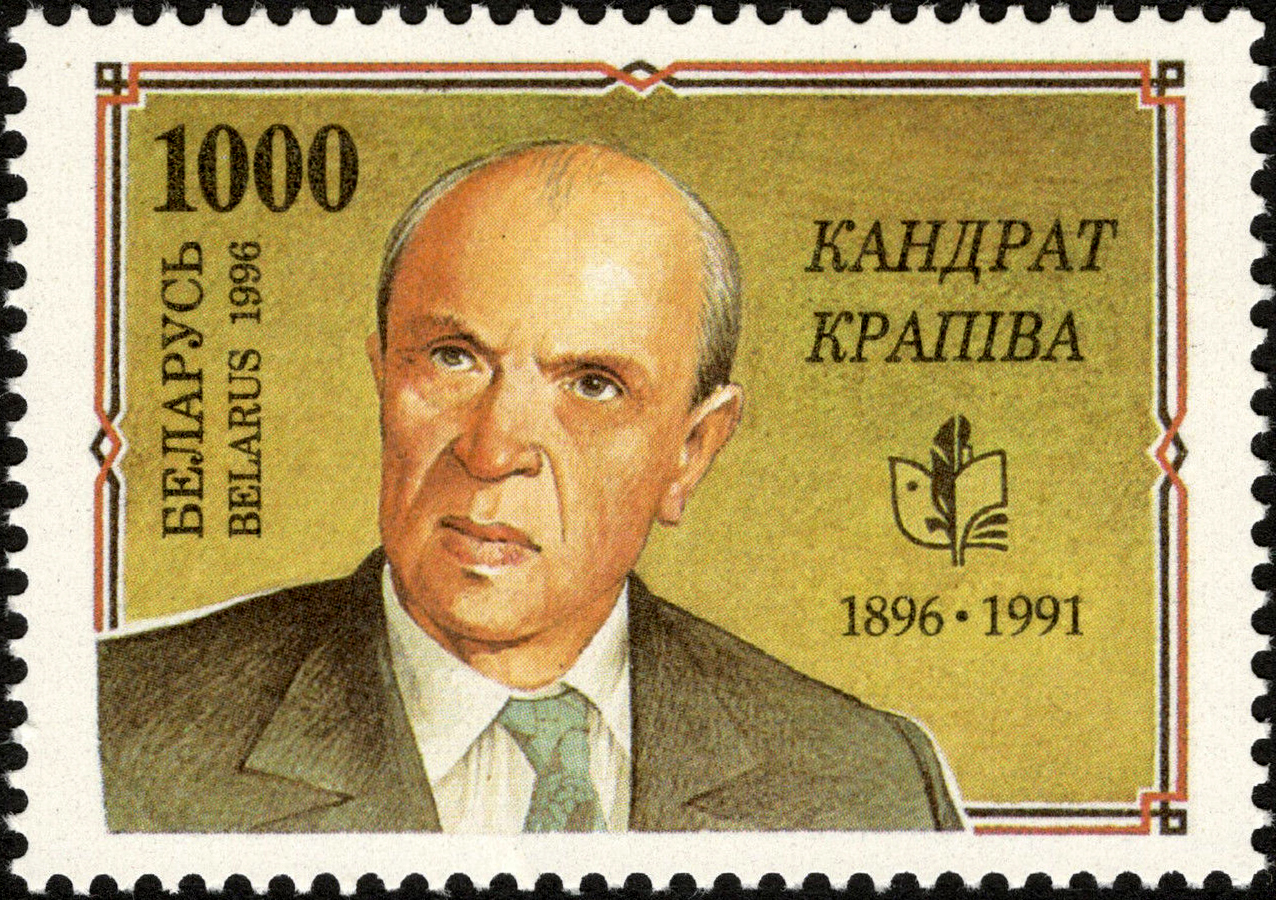
- Krapiva on a 1996 stamp of Belarus
- Born: 5 March 1896; Village Nizok, Minsky Uyezd, Minsk Governorate, Russian Empire
- Died: 7 January 1991 (aged 94); Minsk, Byelorussian SSR, Soviet Union
- Occupations: Writer, playwright, poet, translator, critic

Kandrat Krapiva (Belarusian: Кандра́т Крапіва́, 5 March 1896 – 7 January 1991) was a Soviet and Belarusian writer, playwright, social activist, and literary critic. He was the winner of two Stalin Prizes in 1941 and 1951 and winner of the USSR State Prize in 1971. From 1950 he was a member of the Academy of Sciences of the Belorussian SSR. He was a writer for the magazine, "Połymia".

== Biography ==
Krapiva served in the Tsarist army from 1915, the Red Army from 1920 to 1923, and was involved in the Soviet annexation of Western Belarus in 1939, the Winter War (1939-1940) and the German-Soviet War (1941–45).

He began his literary career in 1922, writing fables, poems, narrative poems, and short stories. Among his notable short stories are The Nettle (1925), Fables (1927), Neighbors (1928), and Live Phenomena (1930). He published the novel The Miadzviedzičy in 1932. He was also a notable playwright, writing plays such as The Partisans (1937), a heroic drama, and He Who Laughs Last (1939), a comedy which earned him the Stalin Prize in 1941. Post-war plays include With the People (1948) and People and Devils (1958).
