= Vozhayol =

Rural settlement in Komi Republic, Russia

Coordinates: 62°50′40″N 51°19′44″E

Vozhayol or Vozhael (Russian: Вожаёль) is a rural settlement in Knyazhpogostsky District of Komi Republic, Russia. Formerly an urban settlement (1942/1944–1991), now it is an administrative unit of the Trakt municipality.

The Ustvymlag, a forestry gulag that held a maximum of 24,000 prisoners and operated from 1937 until the 1960s, was relocated into Vozhayol.
