= A Simple Case =

1932 film

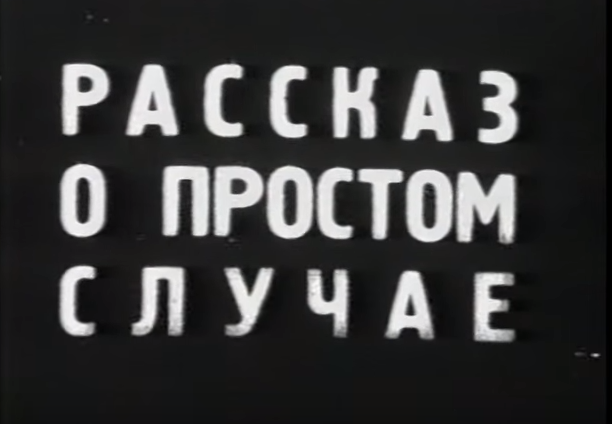
- Film title
- Directed by: Vsevolod Pudovkin; Mikhail Doller
- Written by: Aleksandr Rzheshevsky; Mikhail Koltsov
- Starring: Aleksandr Baturin
- Cinematography: Georgi Bobrov; Grigori Kabalov
- Production company: Mezhrabpom
- Release date: 3 December 1932
- Running time: 96 minutes (2,633 meters)
- Country: Soviet Union
- Language: Russian

A Simple Case (Russian: Простой случай; Prostoy sloochay) is a 1932 Soviet film directed by Vsevolod Pudovkin and Mikhail Doller. Pudovkin was publicly charged with formalism for this experimental sound film and was forced to release without its sound track.

== Plot ==
Set after the end of the Russian Civil War, the story follows three close friends and former Red Army commanders—Langovoy, Zhyoltikov, and their elder comrade Uncle Sasha—who return to their hometown to serve in the military headquarters. While Uncle Sasha and Zhyoltikov remain bachelors and share a room, Langovoy lives with his wife, Mashenka, whom he married during the war. Mashenka was a loyal comrade on the battlefield and remains a loving, supportive partner in peacetime.

When Langovoy falls seriously ill, Mashenka's devotion shines as she spends sleepless nights nursing him back to health. After his recovery, she departs to visit her family for a brief respite. During her absence, Langovoy rescues a woman from an accident and becomes infatuated with her, leading to quiet disapproval from his friends. Upon Mashenka's return, she is heartbroken by the betrayal, while Langovoy is consumed with guilt. Ultimately, he decides to reconcile with Mashenka, seeking and earning her forgiveness.

== Cast ==
- Aleksandr Baturin - Langovoy
- Yevgeniya Rogulina - Mashenka
- Aleksandr Chistyakov - Uncle Sasha
- V. Kuzmich - Zheltikov
- Mariya Belousova
- Anatoli Gorchilin - worker
- A. Chekulayeva
- Ivan Novoseltsev - Vasya
- Afanasi Belov - Grisha
- Vladimir Uralsky - Wounded soldier
