= Mikhail Doller =

Soviet film director and screenwriter

- Born: Mikhail Ivanovich Doller; 1889; Vilno, Russian Empire (now Vilnius, Lithuania)
- Died: 15 March 1952 (aged 62–63); Moscow, Soviet Union (now Russia)
- Occupations: Film director Screenwriter

Mikhail Ivanovich Doller (Russian: Михаил Иванович Доллер, 1889 – 15 March 1952) was a Soviet film director and screenwriter. He worked as co-director with Vsevolod Pudovkin and was awarded Stalin Prize twice in 1941.

== Life ==
Mikhail Doller was born in Vilno, Russian Empire (now Vilnius, Lithuania). He graduated from Vilno Theater School in 1910 and during 1912-1922 worked as an actor and director in various theaters. In 1922-1924 Doller studied in Lev Kuleshov master class. Worked as film director at Mezhrabpom in 1925-1936 and at Mosfilm studio since 1936.

== Filmography ==
director

- 1925 - Bricks (Кирпичики); co-directed with Leonid Obolensky
- 1926 - Ekh, yablochko! (Эх, яблочко!); co-directed with Leonid Obolensky
- 1927 - The End of St. Petersburg (Конец Санкт-Петербурга); co-directed with Vsevolod Pudovkin
- 1928 - Ranks and People (Чины и люди); co-directed with Yakov Protazanov
- 1932 - A Simple Case (Простой случай); co-directed with Vsevolod Pudovkin
- 1934 - Revolt of the Fishermen (Восстание рыбаков) as producer; director: Erwin Piscator
- 1938 - Victory (Победа); co-directed with Vsevolod Pudovkin
- 1939 - Minin and Pozharsky (Минин и Пожарский); co-directed with Vsevolod Pudovkin
- 1941 - Suvorov (Суворов); co-directed with Vsevolod Pudovkin

actor

- 1925 - The Death Ray (Луч смерти)
- 1928 - Salamander (Саламандра)
- 1932 - Horizon (Горизонт)
