= Dar al-Hikma (Iraqi publishing house) =

Dar al-Hikma (Arabic: دار الحكمة, 'House of Wisdom') was an underground publishing house, set up by the Iraqi Communist Party in September 1945. It published literature on politics, science, economy and culture. It issued Arabic translations on Friedrich Engels' Origin of the Family, Maxim Gorky's Mother and texts of Stalin on dialectics and historical materialism. The main source for the literature published was English-language books brought from the Soviet Union. Party members working with bookstores in Baghdad and Amarah enabled the sales of the books. Dar al-Hikma was financed by contributions from party members, the party managed to gather 6,000 Iraqi dinars for the purpose. Dar al-Hikma had a short life-span.
