= Vera Baranovskaya =

Russian actress (1885–1935)

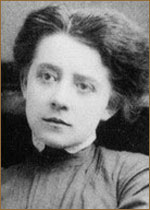
- Vera Baranovskaya
- Born: Vera Vsevolodovna Baranovskaya; 1885; Saint Petersburg, Russia
- Died: 7 December 1935 (aged 49–50); Paris, France
- Occupation: Actress
- Years active: 1916–1935

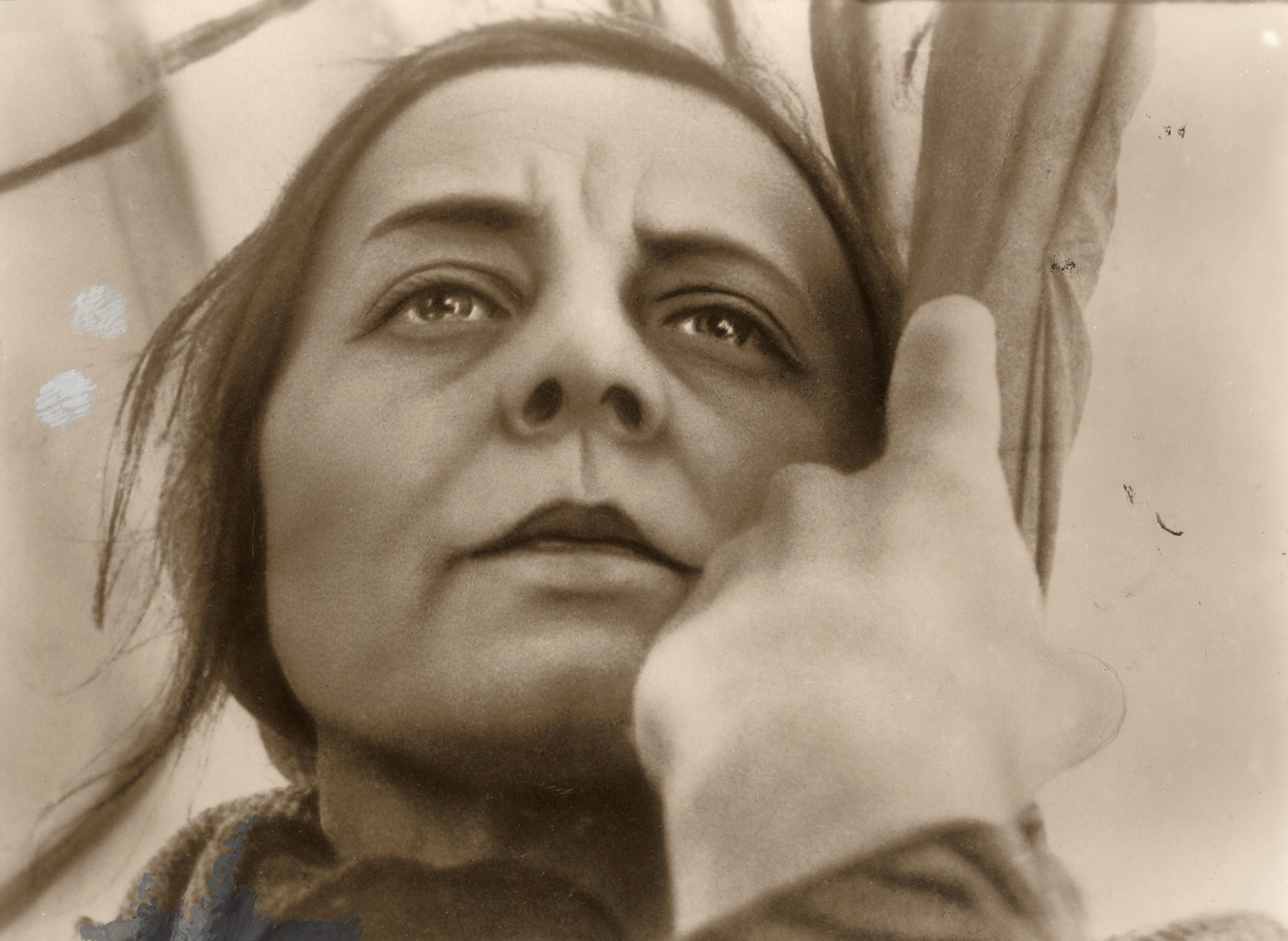
Baranovskaya as Pelageya Vlasova in Mother (1926)

Vera Vsevolodovna Baranovskaya (Russian: Вера Всеволодовна Барановская; 1885 – 7 December 1935) was a Russian and Soviet actress. She performed in more than twenty films between 1916 and 1935.

== Biography ==
Baranovskaya was born in 1885 Saint Petersburg, Russia. She studied acting at the Moscow Art Theatre, where her teacher was Konstantin Stanislavsky. She became member of the Moscow Art Theater troupe in 1903. In 1915, she began to perform independently in theaters in Kharkov, Odessa, Tiflis, Kazan, and other cities.

Baranovskaia’s screen debut was in The Thief-Benefactor (1916), an Anton Chekhov adaptation.

In 1922, she founded the artistic-theatrical workshop ("Mastbar") in Moscow.

In the 1920s, she worked in Germany and Czechoslovakia.

In 1926, Vsevolod Pudovkin cast her as Nilovna, the heroine of his revolutionary tragedy Mother, an adaptation of Maksim Gorky’s 1906 novel. Baranovskaia, who was 40 at the time of shooting, portrayed a much older woman who is devoted to her son and ultimately accepts the inevitability of class struggle. Pudovkin also cast Baranovskaia as the harsh worker’s wife who undergoes a transformation in The End of St. Petersburg (1927). One of her last roles in Soviet cinema was in Abram Room’s social drama Pits (1928).

In 1928, Baranovskaia left the USSR for Czechoslovakia, Germany, and later France, where she continued acting. Sometimes she played parts of proletarians, as in Mikhail Dubson’s Poison Gas (1929) and Carl Jung-hans’s Such Is Life (1929). Her last part, was of a duchess in Max Neufeld’s adaptation of a Viennese operetta, Eternal Waltz (1935).

She died in 1935 in Paris.

== Selected filmography ==
Film
Year	Title	Role	Notes
1926	Mother	Pelageya Nilovna Vlasova	
1927	The End of St. Petersburg	Bolshevik worker's wife	
1929	Revolt in the Reformatory	Fritz's Mother	
1929	Such Is Life	Washerwoman	
1929	Misled Youth	Witwe Kröger	
1929	The Age of Seventeen		
1929	Poison Gas		
1930	Tonka of the Gallows		
1930	St. Wenceslas		
1931	Reckless Youth		
1932	The Night at the Hotel		
1932	Monsieur Albert	La duchesse	
1934	At the End of the World		
