= Anatoli Golovnya =

Soviet cinematographer (1900–1982)

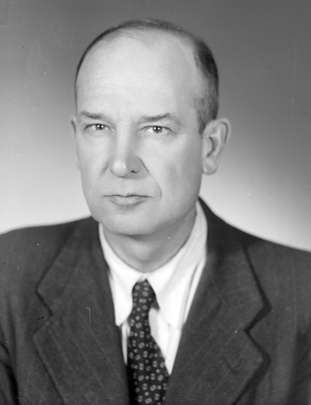
Anatoly Dmitriyevich Golovnya (1900–1982) - Soviet cinematographer, film theorist, teacher

Anatoly Dmitriyevich Golovnya (Russian: Анатолий Дмитриевич Головня; 1 February 1900, Simferopol – 25 June 1982, Moscow) was a Soviet cinematographer, renowned for his work with Vsevolod Pudovkin (with whom he was awarded the Stalin Prize in 1951). In 1969 he was a member of the jury at the 6th Moscow International Film Festival. He was a professor at Moscow's renowned Institute of Cinema (VGIK). One of his students at VGIK was Mikhail Vartanov.

== Selected filmography ==
- Chess Fever (1925)
- Mother (1925)
- The Bricks (1925)
- Mechanics of the Brain (1926)
- Man from the Restaurant (1927)
- The End of St. Petersburg (1927)
- Storm Over Asia (1928)
- The Living Corpse (1929)
- The Deserter (1933)
- Victory (1938)
- Minin and Pozharsky (1939)
- Suvorov (1941)
- Elusive Ian (1942)
- Admiral Nakhimov (1946)
- Zhukovsky (1950)
