= Mat' =

Mat' may refer to:

- Mother (1926 film) (Russian: Мать, Mat)
- Mat (profanity) in the Russian language
