= Anna Zemtsova =

Soviet silent film actress and theorist (1893–1965)

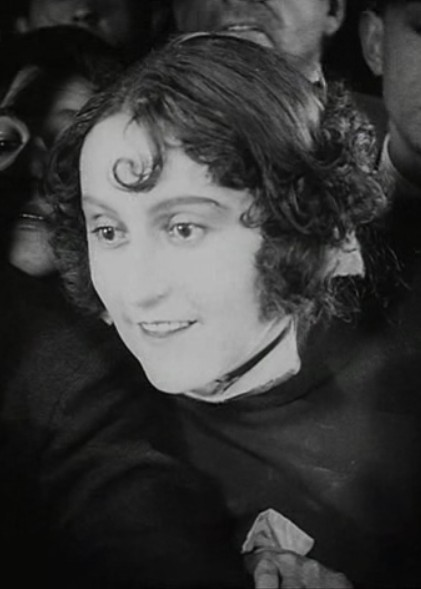
Anna Zemtsova in the 1925 film Chess Fever

Anna Nikolaevna Zemtsova (Russian: Анна Николаевна Земцова; 1893–1965), also known as Anna Li (Russian: Анна Ли), Anna Pudovkina or Anna Zemcova, was a Soviet silent film actress and film theorist. She was married to Vsevolod Pudovkin.

== Career ==
Anna Zemtsova-Selivanova started her career as an actress in the film of Khanzhonkov Studio Boulevard Slush (1918), directed by Boris Chaikovskii. She used the pseudonym Anna Li.

She published three articles in the film newspaper Kino, focused on film theory that signed as Anna Li. Her article The Screen and Rhythm apparently had a powerful effect on Lev Kuleshov.

From 1922 to 1924, Zemtsova supported Vsevolod Pudovkin, which family was succumbing to tuberculosis. Pudovkin assured that she encouraged him for pursuing a career as a filmmaker.

She designed a garment called "The Chameleon" that could transform into twenty outfits, included a coat and a dress. However, Zemtsova stopped her designing activities in 1924.

She appeared in the silent short film Chess Fever (1925) as the heroine, the wife of the hero who is chess addicted. The movie was directed by her husband Vsevolod Pudovkin. She played in the later films of Pudovkin Mother (1926) and The End of Saint Petersburg (1927).

She also played in the German film Klippen der Ehe (Dyk Rudensky, 1930), produced by Gestus-Film GmbH.

She was married to Pudovkin from 1923 until the death of the director in 1953.

== Filmography ==
- Chess Fever (1925)
- The End of St. Petersburg (1927)
- Mother (1926)
