= Revolt of the Fishermen =

1934 Soviet film by Erwin Piscator

- Восстание рыбаков (Wosstanije rybakow)
- Directed by: Erwin Piscator, Mikhail Doller
- Screenplay by: Georgi Grebner
- Produced by: W. Tschaika, Mezhrabpomfilm
- Starring: Dmitri Konsowski: Andreas (Bruyn), a young fisherman who lives with Kedennek; Sergei Martinson: Bredel, owner of the shipping company; Aleksei Dikiy: Martin Kedennek, fisherman from St. Barbara; Judif Gliser: Marie Kedennek, his wife; Nikolai Gladkow: (Johann) Hull, revolutionary sailor from Port Sebastian; F. Ivanov: Nehr, imprisoned fisherman; Emma Tsesarskaya: Katharina, Nehr's wife; Vera Yanukova: Marie, prostitute and temporary help for Desak; Wassili Kowrigin: Kerdhuys, fisherman from Wyk; Konstantin Dawidowski: Priest; Konstantin Eggert: Garrison commander of Port Sebastian; Nikolai Iswolski: Desak, innkeeper in St. Barbara; Alexander Safroschin: Bruyk, boat owner from St. Barbara; Andrei Fait: Soldier; Vladimir Lepko: Fisherman; Alexander Timontajew: Soldier; Ivan Bobrov: Nick; Vladimir Uralsky: Soldier
- Edited by: M. Schitowa
- Music by: Ferenc Szabó, Vladimir Fere, Nikolai Tschemberski
- Release date: 1934
- Running time: 88 (92) minutes
- Country: Soviet Union
- Language: Russian

The Revolt of the Fishermen (Russian Восстание рыбаков, Wosstanije rybakow) is a feature film and early sound film based on the novel Revolt of the Fishermen of Santa Barbara by Anna Seghers, which was made between 1931 and 1934 on behalf of the German-Russian Mezhrabpomfilm company in the Soviet Union. The original intention was to produce a German and a Russian version directed against the growing Nazi movement. Due to considerable organizational deficits and differences between the film company and the director, only the Russian version could be completed. This was the feature film debut of German director Erwin Piscator.

The film deals with a strike among the workers of the Bredel shipping company. The strike is triggered by an accident during fish processing, which the workers attribute to the excessive pace of work on the shipping company's fishing fleet. After the death of a strike leader, the strike escalated and spread from deep-sea fishermen to independent coastal fishermen in the region. The film was shot in the Ukraine, the Russian peninsula of Kola and Moscow.

In its editing effects, long tracking shots and lighting direction, the Revolt of the Fishermen is stylistically similar to the works of Soviet film directors Sergei Eisenstein and Vsevolod Pudovkin from the transition period from silent to sound film. However, due to the technique of the moving camera and its independent sound direction, the feature film also contrasts with the Russian film tradition.

The Revolt of the Fishermen premiered in the Soviet Union in October 1934. An export version with subtitles was distributed in other European countries the following year. The film was presented for the first time in West Germany during the 6th West German Short Film Festival in March 1960. It has since been presented in film societies, arthouse cinemas and film festivals such as the Berlinale 2012, but the "precarious condition of copies slowed down a wider reception".

== Plot ==
The Revolt of the Fishermen deals with a strike among the impoverished deep-sea fishermen and sailors of the coastal town of Port Sebastian (also: San Sebastian), which is triggered by deteriorating working conditions on the ships of the shipowner Bredel. The fishermen on one of Bredel's ships bring in the catch. A shark has come on board as by-catch and tries to eat a small fish while it is still dying. The sailors gutting the fish are repeatedly told to work faster. The pace of work on the ships in Bredel's fishing fleet has increased considerably, as the shipowner now only employs three men per shift instead of four. When a worker cuts off his thumb with a shark knife, the fishermen spontaneously stop working in protest.

In view of the accident, the deep-sea fishermen call on the captain to reduce the work intensity. Four men per shift are to be employed again. When the captain rejects this demand, the deep-sea fishermen decide to go on strike. The fishing fleet had to return to the port of the main town of Port Sebastian. At the shipping company office in Port Sebastian, the sailors are deprived of their wages. The garrison commander and the shipowner Bredel witness the orderly departure of the striking sailors. The commander deploys soldiers.

Strike leader Hull calls for a joint strike between the deep-sea fishermen from Port Sebastian and the coastal fishermen from the surrounding area, whose economic situation is slightly better than that of the deep-sea fishermen. However, joint industrial action does not materialize as the shipowner Bredel offers the small-scale fishermen in the area the prospect of one hundred percent more pay for their catch. The small-scale fishermen then set sail for Bredel, but lose half of their catch in stormy seas. The deep-sea fishermen, on the other hand, win their case against the shipping company and initially resume work. Bredel breaks his promise to pay the coastal fishermen a wage supplement. When the coastal fishermen realize that Bredel does not intend to keep his promise, they finally join forces with the deep-sea fishermen from Port Sebastian. In Desak's inn in the small coastal town of St. Barbara, the deep-sea and coastal fishermen discuss a joint labor dispute. However, the meeting is blown up by an act of arson.

A group led by the moderate fisherman Kerdhuys decides against going on strike and wants to go fishing for Bredel the day after the unsuccessful meeting in St. Barbara. In the morning, Martin Kedennek, an individualist from St. Barbara, and his people, who want to go on strike against the shipping company, ambush Kerdhuys and his comrades-in-arms. Kedennek tries to stop Kerdhuys from breaking the strike with a knife. When Kedennek attacks Kerdhuys, he is struck down by a bullet from one of the soldiers mobilized by the garrison commander. The next morning, there is another direct confrontation in the dunes between strikers and a group of coastal fishermen led by the well-off boat owner Bruyk, who - like Kerdhuys the day before - want to set sail for Bredel. Andreas, a young fisherman who lives with the Kedennek family, also joins the strikebreakers for the sake of appearances. Secretly, however, Andreas is planning an explosive attack on Bruyk's fishing boat.

The mood in the coastal fishing communities is tense. The mourning fishermen from the entire coastal region flock to Martin Kedenek's funeral. The shipowner Bredel arranges for more soldiers to be sent to St. Barbara as he fears an escalation of the conflict. Bredel asked the clergyman to hold back the mourners at the grave. The situation at the gravesite threatens to get out of hand. The fishermen's displeasure at a sermon by the priest, who strongly condemns Kedennek's actions, erupts in a cry from the widow, Marie Kedennek. Marie Kedennek knocks the Bible out of the clergyman's hand and tears it up. Meanwhile, the soldiers in St. Barbara are looking for the revolutionary sailor Hull from Port Sebastian, whom Bredel has identified as the real ringleader of the strike movement. The soldiers trash Desak's pub and rape Marie, a prostitute who works for Desak as a temporary help and who is having an affair with Andreas. The funeral is interrupted by explosions on Bruyk's ship, which Andreas has caused. The explosions are the signal for a revolt by the coastal fishermen against the shipowner and the summoned military, who approach the cemetery in firing lines.

Fierce fighting breaks out between the insurgent fishermen and their wives and the military, during which the saboteur Andreas is shot dead as he flees. After conquering strategically important military positions, the numerically superior insurgents led by strike leader Hull win the unequal battle. In the turmoil of the uprising, Bredel manages to escape.

== Relationship to the original literary work ==
The feature film is based on the novel Revolt of the Fishermen of St. Barbara by Anna Seghers, for which the author was awarded the Kleist Prize in 1928. Piscator made significant changes to the story. He turned the pessimistic ending of the original, in which the fishermen's misery is described in detail, into a militant appeal for the popular front against Nazi Germany. The director pointed out that he had initially moved the plot of the film "from northern Spain to northern Germany", thus enabling the main characters "to come into contact with those who had a similar social position at the time[.] It corresponded to the small fisherman, the small farmer." Piscator's geographical considerations initially relate to the unfinished German version of the film. Film scholar Günther Agde also interprets the completed Russian film version from 1934 as a " virtually placeless, but clearly non-Russian film." Piscator originally wanted to reach a German film audience and the unionized and politically unorganized classes in Germany, who seemed to him to be particularly susceptible to National Socialism. Anna Seghers had already shown that these classes were "dependent to the point of being drained". He, on the other hand, wanted to illustrate how it was possible to remain independent by organizing oneself into a trade union.

According to theater scholar Peter Diezel, Piscator's film adaptation was in line with the strategic guideline of Thälmann's KPD leadership of the "anti-fascist united front and the inclusion of the petit-bourgeois classes". However, this manifested itself as a "rather brutal approach" towards Anna Seghers, as it meant nothing less than a "deconstruction of her narrative text". To this end, as he later summarized, Piscator had introduced a seamen's union in his film adaptation, who worked on the "trawlers sent out by large fisheries and had started a strike over the removal of the fourth man in a work group." Meanwhile, the small-scale fishermen continued to work and had thus essentially become strikebreakers; a series of won and lost strikes followed. According to Piscator, however, "since the organized helped the unorganized, even when it was no longer about their own cause, these strikes turned from purely economic to political actions and - at least I hoped so - into a call against a system like the one the Nazis intended."

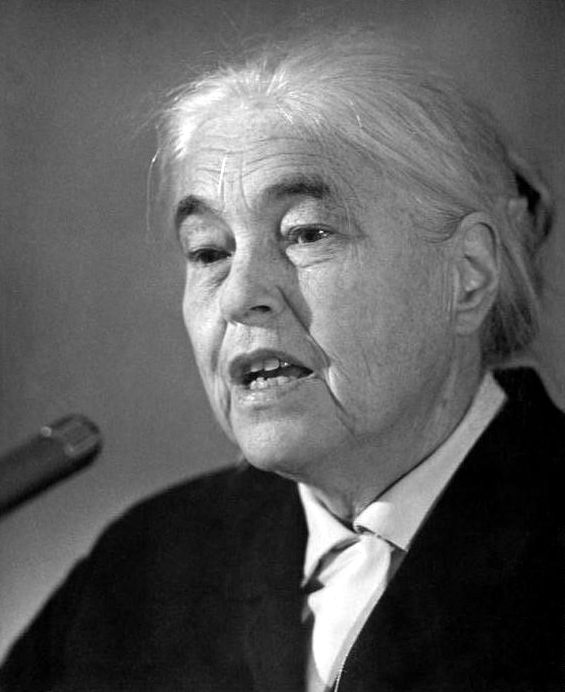
Anna Seghers (1966)

Seghers expert Helen Fehervary also concludes that Piscator deconstructs an essential element of his literary model: the subject of Seghers' model is the "failed strike of the fishermen against the shipping company that controls their wages and their entire lives. In the end, the boats leave under the same conditions that gave rise to the uprising. The everyday life of class relations is thus restored." This element of failure in Seghers' original bears witness to the revolutionary history in Central Europe after the First World War. At the beginning of Seghers' story, the failure of the insurgents is visualized with an allegorization of the uprising: Long after the uprising of the fishermen, the insurrection had "still sat on the empty, white summer-bare marketplace" and "calmly thought of its own, whom it had born, raised, cared for and sheltered for what was best for them". This allegorical moment is missing in Piscator's film, as it is aimed at a successful uprising.

While the geographical setting of Seghers' story is indeterminable, Piscator imagined "a story explicitly set on the German North Sea coast", which evokes the naval and Spartacus uprisings of 1918 and 1919: "In Kedenek's martyrdom, there are echoes of Karl Liebknecht's assassination in January 1919; the funeral procession and burial scenes echo the resonance of the mourning masses that accompanied Liebknecht's coffin through the streets of Berlin. " According to Fehervary, Grebner's script largely adhered to Seghers' original in terms of the plot and characterization of the figures. However, the decisive difference between the story and the film lies at the end, namely the revolt of armed sailors, which does not occur in Seghers. While Seghers retrospectively depicts a failed uprising, in Piscator's film armed sailors come to the aid of the poorly prepared and organized fishermen. After the final battle, the film ends "with a victory song, beaming faces and a happy ending for everyone except the Bredel shipping company and its hired soldiers." Here, behind the camera, one senses the film director's "deeply felt, one might almost say desperate, call for activism in times of crisis."

Cultural scientist Simone Schofer distinguishes the psychological characterization style of the original book from the "politicized" portrayal of characters in the film. Seghers places more emphasis on individuals and extensively depicts individual reactions and feelings in order to make the development of the uprising comprehensible to the reader. The feature film, on the other hand, aims to describe the uprising itself, so that individual actions are not always fully revealed to the viewer. However, in the film, the female characters, who in Seghers' work were mainly absorbed in stereotypical roles in the household and at the hearth, are more strongly exposed and actively involved in the economic and political struggle. While Seghers' narrative is characterized by an emphatically unsentimental, sober form of representation, Piscator is primarily concerned with awakening the revolutionary consciousness of a working-class community in the masses and calling for a united struggle.This can be clearly seen in the "somewhat unrealistic victory of the fishermen over the soldiers" at the end of the film, after an unequal battle with bare hands and sticks against machine guns. Although Seghers' original was "attuned to the inevitable tragedy of defeat" from the outset, her work is nevertheless not at odds with Piscator's intentions. Also in her case, the men did not give up hope for the uprising and by the following year the uprising was still "squatting in the town squares".

== Film analysis ==
Soon after Piscator's death, the State Film Archive of the GDR published an undated information sheet on the Revolt of the Fishermen in its "Film Sheets" series, according to which Piscator, a man of the theater, had mastered the wide range of cinematic expression in his only film. The constant alternation between close-ups, long shots and long tracking shots, the atmospheric lighting direction and the symbolic visual language are emphasized as striking film-aesthetic design elements: "The close-up and detail shots repeatedly bring order to the crowd scenes and constantly force the viewer to make a personal statement. It is both symbolic and at the same time of expressive atmospheric power." The author of the information sheet refers, for example, to the opening symbol of the dying shark devouring a fish with its last convulsions, to a knife flashing in the sand as the workers' fronts face each other, and to the soldiers' boots that freeze Marie shortly before the rape sequence.

Incidentally, the film's highlights are due to a montage technique based on Eisenstein's silent films, through which the dramaturgical contrasts are heightened to "incredible speed". In addition to the camera work, the crowd scenes and the cross-cutting, the still young sound direction is also cited: "The sound becomes particularly effective in the functional incorporation of songs and battle songs, which are heard again and again at the climax of the action." The choir of deep-sea fishermen forms a counterpoint to the action surrounding the small-scale fishermen as a static, reflective element.

The German scholar Klaus Gleber describes the preferred use of "editing effects and montage" as characteristic of Piscator's film: "The latter is used both contrastively (while the priest invokes the divine right of power, the soldiers rage) and symbolically reinforcing (surf as an illustration of the uprising). Close-ups and long tracking shots are just as much a part of the inventory as the image, which is geared towards the viewer's power of association." The communication scientist Hermann Haarmann also emphasizes the rapid camera movements and tracking shots - unusual for the time -, oblique camera work and rapid editing sequences. However, Piscator's film always maintained a "balance between aesthetic innovation and outdated schematization", especially with regard to the rather conventional character acting including physiognomy, posture and clothing on the one hand and an avant-garde formal language borrowed from epic theater on the other. The avant-garde formal language includes the brief introduction of the protagonists through their faces at the beginning of the film, the spoken and superimposed commentaries - the intertitles are reminiscences of silent films - as well as the choral element of the music. The fact that a chorus intervenes in the action after each "film chapter" is due to Bertolt Brecht's Lehrstück-Theater, from which Piscator borrows.

Jasmin Arnold recognizes a film aesthetic innovation in the fact that Piscator interspersed the "sounds of the ships with words, chants and choirs." With regard to the montage principles, she points out that Piscator did not use them everywhere, but only where they seemed appropriate. He left long discussions uncut and approached the speakers. For cultural scientist Bianca Schemel, the cinematic use of the chorus, which is often "too static and wooden", shows Piscator's origins in theater directing. Schemel also refers to the special effect of rear projection that Piscator uses in the assassin Andreas' escape from the military: "Andreas' escape and his pursuit by the soldiers are filmed with a special effect, the rear projection. In this, part of the scene is filmed first and the actor is then shot again in front of the film that has already been shot."

Hermann Haarmann also points to the film's "meaningful lighting direction", which is handled with virtuosity in connection with nature motifs and landscape images, among other things: "Pipe and cigarette smoke rises everywhere and at all times, enveloping heads or silhouettes in backlighting - silhouettes also confirm the use of strongly symbolizing light." At the same time, the intense "emphasis on the elements (sea with ebb and flow, rising and subsiding storm, moonlit night and bright day)" intensifies the "impressive play of light. These motifs from nature converge in the demonstrative intensification of the social conflict as a quasi-naturally developing conflict between the strikers, the strikebreakers and the soldiers bought by the state, the church and the bourgeoisie to do the dirty work."

== Topics ==
On the occasion of the film's re-screening at the Berlinale 2012, film scholar Günter Agde emphasizes the close look at the "work in the details of its execution", which the Revolt of the Fishermen shares with other productions by Mezhrabpomfilm. For example, the "furious beginning" of the film shows "a wealth of details of fishing at sea, salvaging and landing in the harbor." At the same time, however, this presentation of different forms of work revealed "an almost naïve trust on the part of the filmmakers in the physical strength of the workers, which pointed beyond the films." Apart from the technological side of the topic of "work", these film sequences would have given the cinema audience of the time interesting insights into the everyday life of Soviet working environments. In this respect, these images had their own documentary value beyond the film itself. The treatment of the topic of work quickly shifts from the initial focus on concrete work processes to aspects such as the intensification of work, organized labour disputes and their violent suppression.

The film is characterized by the desire to counter the growing Nazi movement at the end of the Weimar Republic with an anti-fascist united front, in line with the KPD policy of the time, for which the petty bourgeois classes were to be won over. Based on the labour dispute between the deep-sea fishermen and the petty-bourgeois coastal fishermen, who, unlike the deep-sea fishermen, owned their means of production, with the shipping company, Piscator wanted to demonstrate the necessity of a joint, organized struggle. In 1975, a West German study on Piscator's work in Soviet emigration had already pointed out that the petty bourgeoisie, constantly threatened with proletarianization by big capital and increasingly so during the crisis, was becoming a potential accomplice of fascism, which promised a solution to the crisis but concealed its means of solving it. Here, "the avant-garde of the proletariat had to create clarity and point out the revolutionary alternative." The necessity and success of such a policy were the subject of Piscator's film.

Exile research in the GDR in the 1970s also picked up on this thematic focus of the film. The united front theme becomes particularly clear at the end of the film, where a chanting choir formulates a call to all exploited people to join the united front. But even the beginning of the film reflects this concept. Since, according to GDR exile researcher Renate Waack-Ullrich, the film aims to enlighten the middle classes, who are afflicted by petty-bourgeois ideology, about their own social situation, Piscator begins it "not with the story of the [coastal] fishermen, but with the increasingly intensifying main contradiction between capitalists and the working class: Bredel's fishing vessel."

According to Renate Waack-Ullrich, the fishermen, as representatives of the petty bourgeoisie, are only "introduced into the action when the main contradiction between the capitalists and the working class is exposed. The outcome of the strike depends on whether the fishermen side with the capitalists or the sailors - this is shown primarily visually." Their actions are then depicted in the following decisive stages: how they allow themselves to be misled into breaking the strike by Bredel's false promises, how most of them do not want to understand that they have long been proletarianized despite their material plight, and how only several deaths in their own ranks bring them to desperate joint action. At the end of the film, even the moderate fisherman and unsuccessful strikebreaker Kerdhuys finally realizes that only a joint industrial action can lead to success.

According to communication scientist Hermann Haarmann, Piscator positioned his film project "exactly where there is a need for argumentation: in the agitation of the middle classes, who are objectively threatened with proletarianization, but at the same time believe every promise of social advancement." The seductiveness of ideology and propaganda does the rest. Since the middle classes were the basis for the success of fascism, Piscator placed particular emphasis on small-scale fishermen in line with the classical theory of fascism, which "holds the social status between the classes, between the bourgeoisie and the proletariat, responsible for the National Socialist conflagration". However, Haarmann interprets the underlying political intention of the film project as deceptive. Given a divided workers' movement, whose factions had accused each other of breaking their word and left the field to fascism at the end of the Weimar Republic, the desire of intellectual KPD sympathizers, who at the beginning of the 1930s "still hoped for a turnaround and wanted to work towards it", was illusory.

== Adverse production circumstances ==
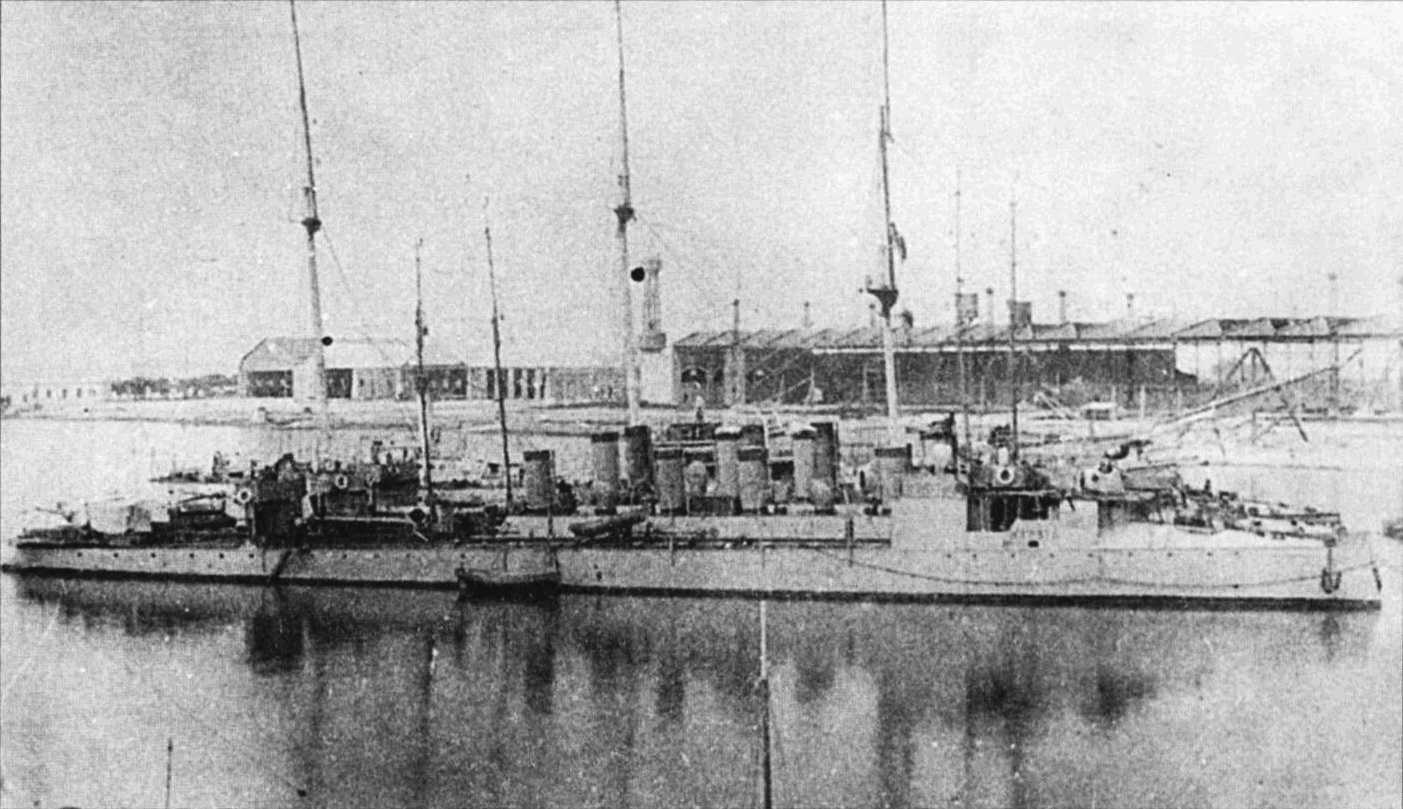
Not available: Destroyer of the Soviet Black Sea Fleet (1924)

In the summer of 1930, Piscator had initially planned to film Theodor Plievier's successful debut novel Des Kaisers Kulis, which dealt with the precarious working conditions on the ships of the imperial navy. According to the German scholar Klaus Gleber, however, the realization of an elaborate film with revolutionary content in Germany would have faced "considerable difficulties, especially as the 'Münzenberg Group' did not have the necessary means of production." The left-wing media entrepreneur Willi Münzenberg therefore put Piscator in touch with the Soviet joint-stock company Mezhrabpomfilm. During negotiations in Moscow, Piscator reached an agreement with Mezhrabpomfilm in September 1930 on a film version of the Plievier novel. In April 1931, he traveled to Moscow with an initial synopsis for the screenplay. Piscator had asked to use ships from the Soviet Black Sea Fleet for the filming. He wanted to use these ships to recreate the 1916 Battle of Jutland, which is the subject of Plievier's novel. It was only weeks after his arrival in Moscow that Mezhrabpomfilm informed him that his application to use the Black Sea Fleet had been rejected. The Soviet Foreign Minister, People's Commissar for Foreign Affairs Maxim Litvinov, feared diplomatic entanglements with the German Reich in this case and refused.

Anna Seghers' novel Revolt of the fishermen of St. Barbara was quickly selected as a substitute. Peter Diezel assumes that the intensive study of the 1918 sailors' mutiny and thematic analogies between Plievier's and Seghers' works contributed to Piscator's decision to choose Anna Seghers' story as a suitable replacement.

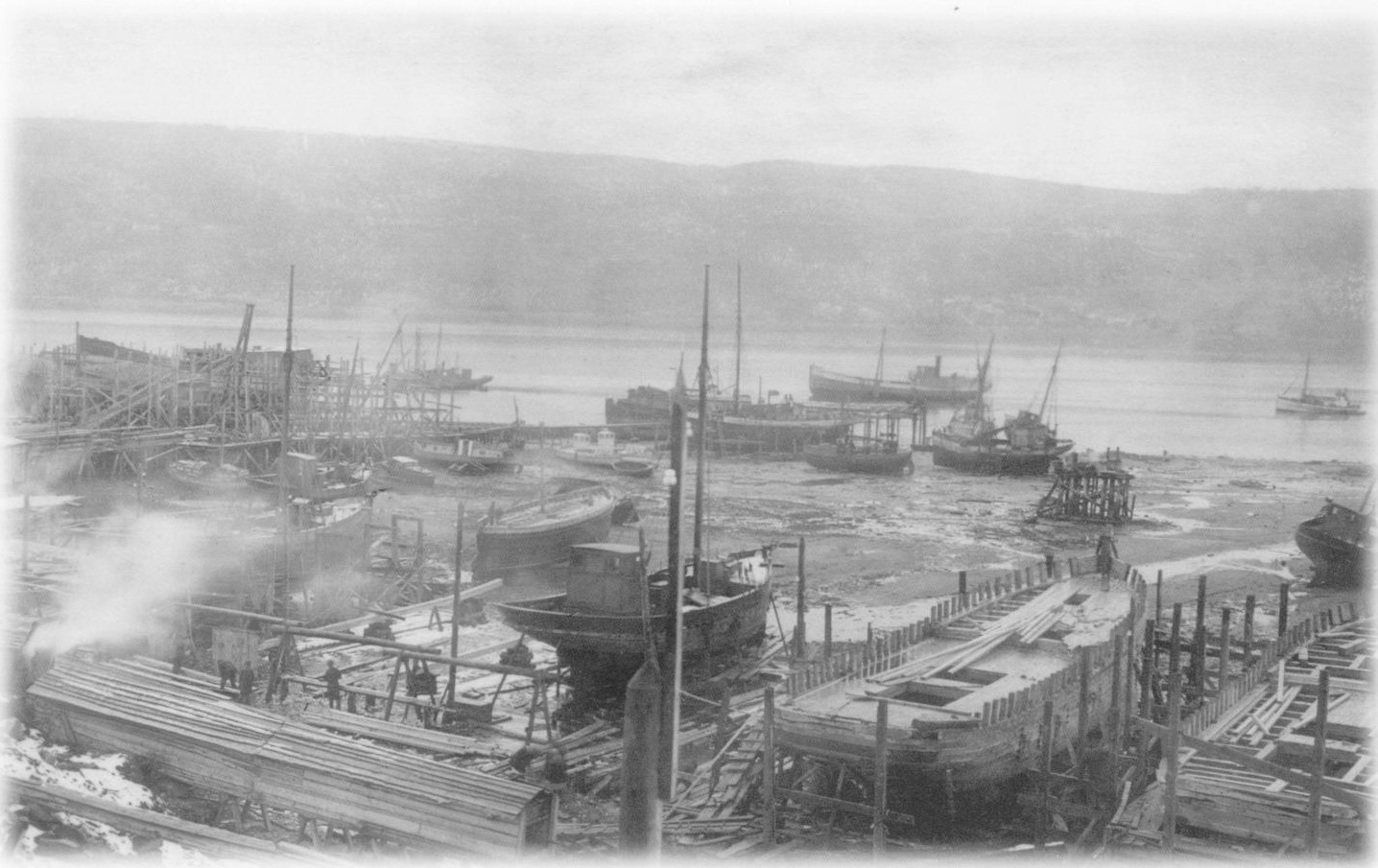
The Port of Murmansk (1928)

As subsequent dubbing was not yet possible at the time for technical reasons, both a German and a Russian version of the film were to be shot. The screenplay for the planned German version of the Revolt of the Fishermen was to be written by the Austrian-British writer Anna Wiesner, who had also worked on Piscator's screenplay for Des Kaisers Kulis. The Russian version of the screenplay was written by the scenarist Georgi Grebner. Although Piscator had virtually no experience in the film industry, Meschrabpom-Film had set aside just five or at most six months to work on the script and shoot the film, which meant that considerable problems were inevitable.

In July 1931, Piscator began filming the first shots of nature in the port city of Murmansk on the Arctic Ocean. The Arctic film motifs and the long summer twilight phases made a lasting impression on him: "These magnificent white nights there in the north, which last for three months, or the nets frozen in the ice." Later that month, during a stay in Berlin, he hired fourteen German and Austrian actors for the film project, including Lotte Lenya as the prostitute Marie and Paul Wegener as the shipowner Bredel. At the beginning of August 1931, indoor filming was to begin in the Meshrabpom studio in Moscow, but a fire broke out. A fire destroyed two of a total of three studios, including the decorations that had been set up in them, and required weeks of renovation work.

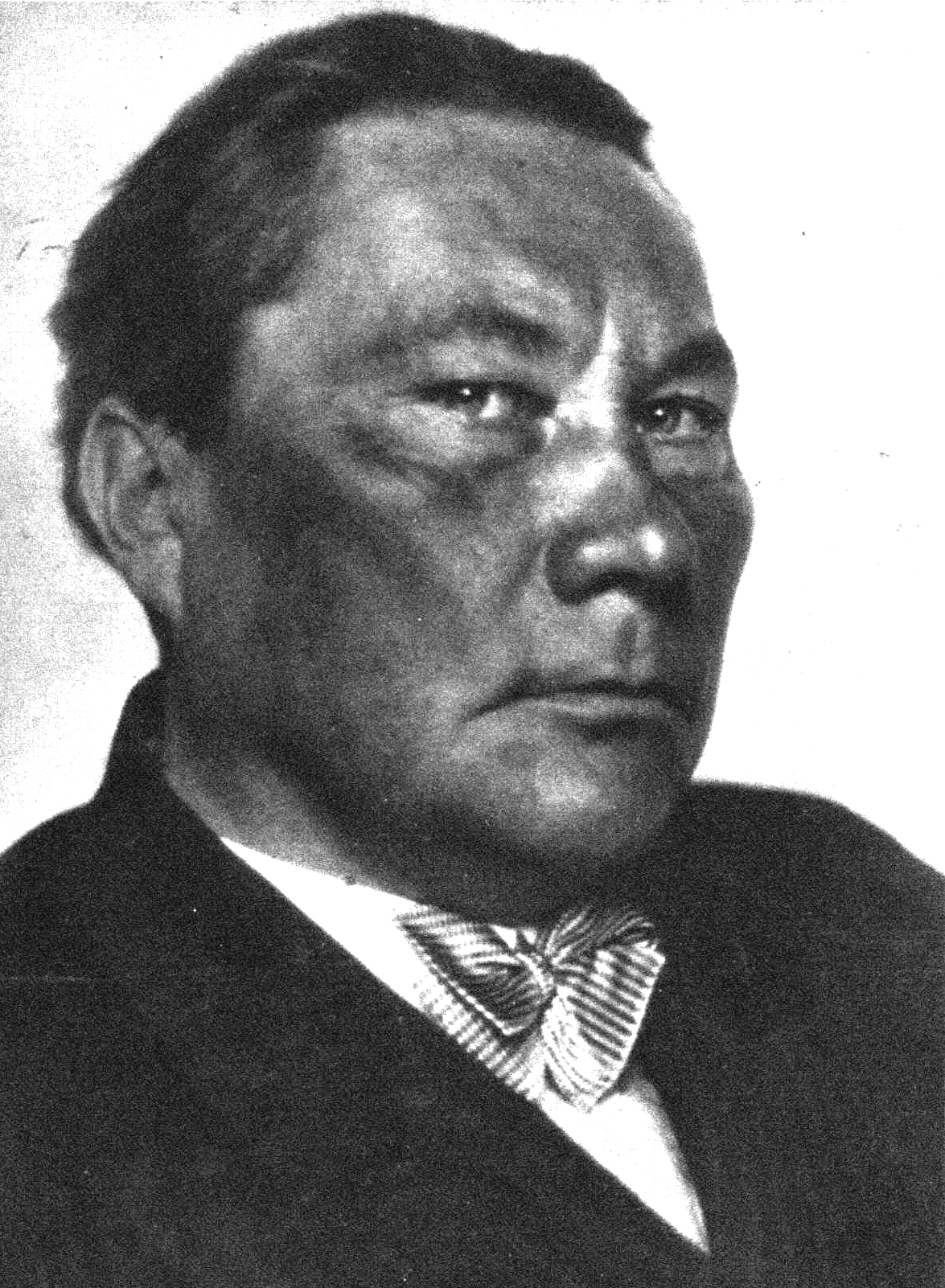
Paul Wegener (1932), actor playing Bredel in the canceled German version of the film

Piscator decided without much hesitation to prepare the exterior shots on the Ukrainian Black Sea coast near Odesa instead, but material shortages and transportation difficulties for the decoration led to delays. The director spent a considerable amount of his time waiting "for the provision of financial resources, film crews and material". Disputes arose over the scope of the buildings for the St. Barbara film village. Piscator threatened to cancel the work and renegotiated his contract with Mezhrabpomfilm in August 1931. When filming could finally have started in Odessa in mid-September 1931, stormy weather hindered the work. Mezhrabpomfilm then ordered the Soviet film director Lev Kuleshov to Odesa to provide Piscator with administrative support. Kuleshov was to work out a detailed shooting schedule for the film. At the same time, Piscator was given director Mikhail Doller as his first assistant. When they fell behind schedule again, the only option was to stop work temporarily, as the contracts with the German actors had already expired in November 1931.

Piscator repeatedly complained to political authorities such as the Central Committee of the Communist Party of the Soviet Union about the desperate production conditions and the poor supervision of the ambitious film project by Mezhrabpomfilm. At the beginning of 1932, the Mezhrabpomfilm directors informed Piscator that the plan for a German version of the film would be dropped and that only a Russian version could be shot. Once again, a new contract was negotiated. After months of interruption, Piscator was able to resume filming in Odessa in late spring and summer 1932 with Soviet actors. Cooperation with the Soviet actors, who came from different acting traditions (Stanislavski, Meyerhold, Mayakovsky), proved difficult. In the fall of 1932, the film was shot in the rebuilt Mezhrabpomfilm studios in Moscow. In the spring of 1933, the National Socialists' rise to power finally shattered Piscator's intention of reaching a wider German audience with a political film. It was not until the fall of 1933 that he was able to take on the film music, but had to replace the composer Yuri Shaporin with younger colleagues due to insufficient cooperation. At the same time, it became apparent that film editing would take another few months. In the spring of 1934, Piscator completed the film project, which had taken almost three years with interruptions. The film cleared the final hurdle and was released by the main cinema administration. The official film premiere was set for October 1934.

== Film poster ==
The film poster for the original Russian version from 1934 was designed by commercial artist Michail Weksler. The poster for the black-and-white film is designed in color. The film title is set off from the actual illustration at the top edge of the poster in white letters on a red background. The poster shows three characters from the film, the strike leader Kedennek, the boatman Bruyk with his characteristic tobacco pipe and the prostitute Marie in the background, on a sea background in strong yellow and green tones. Kedennek and Bruyk are identified as sailors and coastal fishermen by features such as striped clothing, slouch hats, pipes and spade beards. The poster thus focuses on the two contrasting positions within the communities of coastal fishermen, some of whom, following Kedennek, join the sailors' strike or, like the relatively well-off boat owner Bruyk, set out as "strikebreakers" to fish for Bredel. The upper image segment contains details of other film artists involved. (Western) European distribution companies advertised the subtitled export version for the (Western) European market, in some cases with their own film poster.

== Reception at the time ==
A few months before the official premiere in Moscow cinemas, a differentiated appraisal of the film was published in May 1934 in the Moscow-based Deutsche Zentral-Zeitung by the Soviet critic Sergei Dinamov, who was captivated by the artistic quality of the film and "completely spellbound". Nevertheless, Dinamov complained that the plot was so complicated that "in the middle of the film, all the threads get tangled up and it becomes difficult to follow the story." A few weeks after Dinamov's review, the trade magazine "Kino", published by the Association of Filmmakers (ARRK), published a drastic review. The prominent author of this review, the avant-garde writer Osip Brik, criticized the film for its "consistent pathos", the "diverging styles" and the "lack of dramatically growing tension." Brik blamed the management of Mezhrabpomfilm for the supposed failure of the project - a common approach for attacks on unpopular film projects at the time. The film company had not supported Piscator sufficiently in his foray into film directing and had not familiarized him with the actual needs of the Soviet cinema audience. Jasmin Arnold assumes that Brik carried out his attack on Meschrabpom "with the approval of state authorities." The communication scientist Hermann Haarmann also interpreted the criticism as part of a "staged press campaign", which Brik had started under official pressure.

The following month, Piscator seconded a group of renowned directors of the Mezhrabpomfilm around Vsevolod Pudovkin in Izvestia, who praised Revolt of the Fishermen as a "realistic work", praised the "closeness to life and authenticity of the individual portrayal of its heroes", defended the film as " clever tendency art" and sharply attacked Brik.

Piscator's feature film premiered in Moscow cinemas on October 5, 1934. Whether it was also shown in other parts of the country besides Moscow and presumably Leningrad is by no means certain, given the considerable lack of films in Soviet cinemas at the time. After the premiere in the Deutsche Zentral-Zeitung, the Austrian critic Hugo Huppert attributed the film a high topical value in view of the "events in Spain" - that is, an uprising by the Spanish socialists and the bourgeois Catalan government prior to the Spanish Civil War. The Hungarian film critic Béla Balázs, who reviewed the film for the Rote Zeitung, did not yet recognize "a perfect masterpiece" in the Revolt of the Fishermen, but nevertheless described Piscator as a great film director in view of the "special nuances of the characters". The Revolt of the Fishermen was the first sound film that fulfilled the expectation of a "differentiated, so to speak psychologically deeper, so to speak three-dimensional characterization". This can be seen in the impressive performance of the female characters as well as in the many nuances of the political characters.

The writer Ernst Ottwalt criticized in the German edition of the magazine Internationale Literatur, published in Moscow, that Revolt of the Fishermen lacked "clarity and was difficult to understand", but also decisively rejected Brik's argument. Piscator had "dared [...] to portray the cause instead of the occasion, instead of the external, superficial tension of the plot its inner lawfulness with all consistency in artistic and political terms." The following year, Mezhrabpomfilm distributed an export version of Revolt of the Fishermen, for which subtitles were produced in several languages. The export version could not be shown in Nazi Germany, but - even after the dissolution of Meschrabpom-Film in July 1936 - it was shown in several major Western European cities such as Zurich, Brussels and Paris. A Spanish film poster from 1936 points to screenings in Spain. There may also have been screenings in Copenhagen and Warsaw, as copies of the film were later found there.

The communist writer Arthur Koestler, who had attended a closed screening in Zurich, criticized the film in the Parisian exile press in view of its "profound dishonesty", as Piscator unrealistically assumed that the long road from the mass misery of the fishermen to the victorious revolution would be without complications. The investigative journalist Leo Lania, who reviewed the film for the exile organ Pariser Tageszeitung, took the opposite view. In Lania's view, Piscator had broken new aesthetic ground as a film director, similar to his theater work, as the Revolt of the Fishermen combined various stylistic elements into a work of art that could claim to convey "important approaches for the further development of a great political mass drama".

== Rediscovery in Germany ==
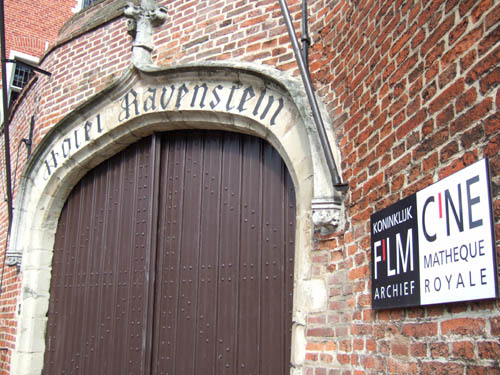
Cinémathèque royale de Belgique, Brussels

At the 6th West German Short Film Festival, which was held in Oberhausen in February and March 1960, the film was officially screened for the first time in West Germany on March 4, 1960, in a trimmed, 65-minute print. The founder of the West German Short Film Festival, Hilmar Hoffmann, had learned of the existence of two 16-mm copies of the film in the Cinémathèque royale de Belgique and the Cinémathèque française the previous year. The director of the Belgian Cinémathèque, Jacques Ledoux, had agreed to a screening of The Fishermen's Revolt as part of a retrospective in Oberhausen. The Film-Telegramm was impressed by the dynamic crowd scenes: "Ant-like, nervous and feverish, the back and forth swaying of fear and anger in the shooting scenes - the counter-movements of the masses culminate in the spirited counter-cutting of the images to create oppressive drama. " The magazine Filmforum praised the masterful direction of the images: "When a clenched fist stretches towards the ceiling and is captured by the camera together with a lamp, when the Bible of the unctuous clergyman is torn apart at the funeral and the sharp sea wind drives the leaves across the cemetery [...] - the image content is always skillfully assigned to the sequence of events." Subsequently, the film was increasingly shown in West German film clubs. Piscator was pleased with the positive media response in West Germany, but found the Belgian copy of his film "dreadful and completely wrongly edited."

The film became known to a wider West German audience when it was shown on West German television (NDR) on February 20, 1965, with an introduction by Hilmar Hoffmann. The film critic Dietrich Kuhlbrodt described the film on the occasion of the television premiere as an "irreplaceable document of German film history" and praised Piscator's "further development of Eisenstein's and Pudowkin's montage principles." The official premiere in the GDR followed on May 1, 1965, in the "Archivfilmtheater" Camera, the cinema of the State Film Archive of the GDR, in East Berlin. An information sheet from the GDR State Film Archive characterized the Revolt of the Fishermen as one of the "top works of the sound film era in the Soviet Union" and placed the film in a row with other masterpieces: "With its thrillingly topical message, the magnificently adequate form that compels passionate partisanship, it [i.e. the work] has earned an honorable place in film history alongside such masterpieces as 'Chapayev' or 'The Road to Life'. " In November 1975, the film was also shown in a "new adaptation" on GDR television (DFF 2) on the occasion of Anna Seghers' 75th birthday.

A restored version, which had been reconstituted from several film prints, was presented by Neue Visionen Filmverleih in Berlin on March 1, 2001. Hermann Haarmann commented the following year in the Frankfurter Allgemeine Zeitung: "Piscator's film is a work of art of special quality, which not only borrows from the greats of 'Russian film' (Alfred Kerr) such as Eisenstein and Pudovkin, but also independently develops the young medium in terms of visual and sound dramaturgy. Against Eisenstein's advice, Piscator insists on moving the camera. He attaches it to the bow of a ship or lets it go on a roundabout. Cross-fades are another creative device. However, this was by no means acceptable to Joseph Stalin, who expressed his disapproval of the foreigner Piscator in a private preview in the Kremlin."

Piscator's feature film was the object of an installation by Frankfurt artist Jeronimo Voss, which was shown at the Frankfurter Kunstverein (2010), in a Berlin gallery (solo exhibition, 2011), at the Vienna Secession (2013) and at the Württembergischer Kunstverein Stuttgart (2013/14). Voss based his work on the experience of the failure of Piscator's intention - at the time of the film's premiere, the NSDAP, against which the film was supposed to be directed, was already in power. Voss worked with a video and overhead projector and ink drawings on film. According to the journalist Hili Perlson, Voss' phantasmagorical reconstruction of Piscator's film project of the 1930s was not lost to history, "but rather sets its failure as a starting point for the present." In its "Retrospective 2012: The Red Dream Factory", the 2012 Berlinale featured the German premiere of a 60-minute silent version of the film. The silent film version was accompanied by fragments of a film score by Hanns Eisler. Eisler had composed two polyphonic choruses with piano accompaniment for the original German version of the film in the early summer of 1931, which premiered in Berlin on February 12, 2012. The choral fragments were found in the Hanns Eisler Archive of the Berlin Academy of Arts. Seven decades after its premiere, the film remained dramaturgically effective, as documented by the impressions of one critic: "When the lights go on in the hall, you feel a little disheveled. With the ears still in a time when something was about to happen, with the eyes already back in festival mode [...]."

== Bibliography ==
- Arnold, Jasmin (2003). Die Revolution frisst ihre Kinder. Deutsches Filmexil in der UdSSR (in German). Marburg: Tectum. ISBN 9783828884793.
- Diezel, Peter (2008). "Erwin Piscators Film "Aufstand der Fischer"". Argonautenschiff (Yearbook of the Anna Seghers Gesellschaft Berlin und Mainz E. V.) (16). Berlin: 68–79.
- Diezel, Peter (2004). "Im ständigen Dissens. Erwin Piscator und die Meshrabpom-Film-Gesellschaft". Filmexil (20): 39–56.
- Fehervary, Helen (2008). "Landschaften eines Aufstands – und wie sie sich bewegen. Erwin Piscators und Thomas Langhoffs Verfilmungen von Anna Seghers' "Aufstand der Fischer von St. Barbara"". Argonautenschiff (Yearbook of the Anna Seghers Gesellschaft Berlin und Mainz E. V.) (16). Berlin: 80–88.
- Haarmann, Hermann, ed. (2002). Erwin Piscator am Schwarzen Meer. Briefe, Erinnerungen, Photos. Berlin: Bostelmann & Siebenhaar. ISBN 3934189830.
- Kruze, Norman (1994). "Fil'm Ervina Piskatora "Vosstanie rybakov"". Kinovedicheskie Zapiski. 24: 120–139.
- Schemel, Bianca (2001). "Erwin Piscator und „Wosstanije rybakow" (Aufstand der Fischer)". In May, Rainhard; Jackson, Hendrik (eds.). Filme für die Volksfront. Erwin Piscator, Gustav von Wangenheim, Friedrich Wolf – antifaschistische Filmemacher im sowjetischen Exil. Berlin: Stattkino Berlin. pp. 89–111. ISBN 3000075402.
