= Dubasov =

Dubasov (Russian: Дубасов) is a Russian masculine surname originating from the noun dubas (a fool);, its feminine counterpart is Dubasova. It may refer to

- Beáta Dubasová (born 1963), Slovak singer
- Fyodor Dubasov (1845–1912), Russian admiral
- Ivan Dubasov (1897–1988), Russian artist
- Nikolay Dubasov (1869–1935), Russian pianist and music teacher
- Prokhor Dubasov (1743–1823), Russian soldier
