= Storm over Asia (1928 film) =

1928 film

- Directed by: Vsevolod Pudovkin
- Written by: O. Brik; I. Novokshonov
- Starring: I. Inkizhinov; A. Tchistakov; L. Dediseff; A. Sudkaveich
- Cinematography: Anatoli Golovnya
- Release date: 1928
- Running time: 125 minutes
- Country: Soviet Union
- Languages: Silent film; Russian intertitles

Storm over Asia (Russian: Потомок Чингисхана, Potomok Chingiskhana, "The Heir to Genghis Khan") is a 1928 Soviet film directed by Vsevolod Pudovkin, written by Osip Brik and Ivan Novokshonov, and starring Valéry Inkijinoff. It is the final film in Pudovkin's "revolutionary trilogy", alongside Mother (1926) and The End of St. Petersburg (1927).

== Plot ==
Storm Over Asia

In 1918 a young and simple Mongol herdsman and trapper is cheated out of a valuable fox fur by a European capitalist fur trader. Ostracized from the trading post, he escapes to the hills after brawling with the trader who cheated him. In 1920 he becomes a Soviet partisan, and helps the partisans fight for the Soviets against the occupying British army. However he is captured by the British when they try to requisition cattle from the herdsmen at the same time as the commandant meets with a reincarnated Grand Lama. After the trapper is shot, the army discovers an amulet that suggests he is a direct descendant of Genghis Khan. They find him still alive, so the army restores his health and plans to use him as the head of a puppet regime. The trapper is thus thrust into prominence as he is placed in charge of the puppet government. By the end, however, the "puppet" turns against his masters in an outburst of fury.

== Historical portrayal ==
The British were never in Mongolia, much less ruling it as shown in the film, whereas the Soviet Union was heavily active spreading political influence by discrediting the unstable Bogd Khanate, whilst working towards the establishment of a Mongolian Soviet puppet state. However, given the variety of clues to the fictionalized narrative of the film (e.g. the military decorations that seem to resemble the German Empire juxtaposed together with the flag of the Union Jack), it's improbable that the film was ever received as a documentary. According to Slavicist John MacKay, it seems "the studio was trying to make a kind of all-purpose anti-imperialist, pro-Soviet film, transferable to many locales, rather than an analysis of a specific setting." As to some historical accuracy, Anti-Bolshevik monarchist troops led by rogue "mad baron" Roman von Ungern-Sternberg did invade Mongolia in October 1920, vying for territorial control with the Chinese.

Unlike such films as October 1917 or Battleship Potemkin, which are about revolutions in European Russia, Storm over Asia concerns itself with a distorted, fictionalised British occupation of Southeastern Siberia and Northern Tibet.

While film plot was heavily fictional, some film footage, such as Cham dance, was filmed during an actual ceremony at Tamchinsky datsan.

== Cast ==
- Valéry Inkijinoff — Bair, the Mongol [The Son - U.S.] (as Valeri Inkishanov)
- I. Dedintsev — The British Commandant
- Aleksandr Chistyakov — The Russian Rebel Leader
- Viktor Tsoppi — Henry Hughes, unscrupulous fur-buyer.
- F. Ivanov — The Lama
- V. Pro — British missionary, translates amulet
- Boris Barnet — British soldier, pipe smoker
- Karl Gurniak — British soldier
- I. Inkizhinov — Bair's Father
- L. Belinskaya — The Commandant's Wife
- Anel Sudakevich — Commandant's blonde daughter

== Reception ==
On the review aggregator website Rotten Tomatoes, Storm over Asia has an 83% approval rating based on 6 reviews, with an average rating of 8.70/10.

In a 2008 survey by Seans magazine, film historian Nikolai Izvolov listed it seventh among his 10 favourite Russian films. The Russian Guild of Film Critics placed Storm over Asia in its list of the 100 best films in the history of Russian cinema.

The film was rejected by the British Board of Film Censors due to the "brutal conduct" of the British Army troops depicted, as well as "on the ground that the film is provocative of or likely to cause a breach of the peace." It was eventually passed with a PG certificate in 1989.
