= Minin and Pozharsky (film) =

1939 film by Vsevolod Pudovkin, Mikhail Doller

- Directed by: Vsevolod Pudovkin; Mikhail Doller
- Written by: Viktor Shklovsky
- Starring: Aleksandr Khanov; Boris Livanov
- Cinematography: Anatoli Golovnya
- Music by: Yuri Shaporin
- Production company: Mosfilm
- Release date: 3 November 1939
- Running time: 3647 meters (109 minutes)
- Country: Soviet Union
- Language: Russian

Minin and Pozharsky (Russian: Минин и Пожарский, romanized: Minin i Pozharskiy) is a 1939 Soviet historical drama directed by Vsevolod Pudovkin and Mikhail Doller, based on Viktor Shklovsky's novel "Russians at the Beginning of the XVII Century".

The film is about the Time of Troubles, Russia's struggle for independence led by Dmitry Pozharsky and Kuzma Minin against the Polish Invasion in 1611–1612. It was the first of several important Soviet films to show Poland as an aggressor.

In 1941, Pudovkin, Doller, Livanov, and Khanov received the Stalin Prize.

== Plot ==
The film begins in the summer of 1610, in a rural area devastated by the Polish invaders. Merchants Kuzma Minin and Nelyub Ovtsyn arrive by cart. Minin finds a wounded peasant named Roman on a burning ruin and takes him away from the ruined village. On the way, Roman regains consciousness and talks to the merchants, during which Minin expresses the thought that they must save Russia from the Poles. Roman says goodbye to the merchants and leaves. By winter, Roman finds himself at a monastery near Moscow, where he meets Prince Dmitry Pozharsky and, at the request of a servant named Stepan, temporarily takes care of the horses. However, an unexpected visitor, the nobleman Grigory Orlov (Roman’s former master), arrives at the monastery, and Roman hides in the stable. Stepan discovers the truth about Roman and, after finding him hiding, confronts him. But Prince Pozharsky intervenes and stops the fight, advising Roman to go to Moscow to his estate.

Roman leaves, and the prince returns to his chambers, where he finds Orlov drunk and consuming the monastery’s supplies. The prince prepares to rest, but Orlov tries to engage him in conversation and persuades him to drink with him. Pozharsky remains firm, and Orlov, frustrated, sits down to drink beer alone. At this moment, one of Orlov's servants informs him of a petitioner, and he goes outside, where he encounters a Greek monk. The monk hands Orlov a letter addressed to the commander of the Polish garrison in the Kremlin, and Orlov agrees to deliver it to Moscow. The scene then shifts to the Sretensky Gates in Moscow, where the Poles block the passage, even throwing carts with logs into the river. Roman is searched aggressively, while Orlov passes without obstruction, angering the crowd. Meanwhile, in the Kremlin, the boyars discuss matters with the overseer of Usvyat, Yan Sapieha. Orlov arrives and delivers the letter to Sapieha, staying in the Kremlin with the invaders and traitorous boyars. The letter reveals that the First Volunteer Army is approaching Moscow and that an uprising led by Prince Pozharsky is planned. Sapieha orders the burning of Moscow, and the Poles begin carrying out the order.

Roman gathers a crowd of peasants at Prince Pozharsky’s estate, where an experienced warrior orders them to rise up against the invaders. The Poles are ambushed and attacked with logs. As some areas attempt to extinguish the fires, Prince Pozharsky leads the peasants to the positions of an old gunsmith and rebel, Fyodor Zotov. Meanwhile, Polish infantry emerges from the Kremlin gates and clashes with the rebels. The prince is injured by gunfire, and a new unit of Polish infantry arrives to assist. Despite Zotov’s warnings, Pozharsky leads his forces in an unsuccessful attack. As a result, most of the rebels, including Roman, retreat from the city, while the prince’s wife accompanies her wounded husband in a sleigh to his family estate. On the way, they meet the advanced forces of the First Zemsky Militia, led by the voivode Prokopy Lapyunov from Ryazan. Lapyunov listens to the princess's complaints and explains the conflict with boyar Dmitry Trubetskoy and ataman Ivan Zarutsky. Stepan and the princess help the prince to stand in the sleigh, showing him the ruined city and the peasants’ retreat. Overcome with grief, the prince faints.

As time passes, the Poles capture Smolensk, the Swedes seize Novgorod, and the Cossacks under Ataman Zarutsky kill Prokopy Lapyunov, leading to the disbandment of the First Volunteer Army. In the fall of 1611, Minin gathers the people of Nizhny Novgorod at a village assembly. He tries to explain the idea of organizing a new militia, but his proposal is met with resistance from other merchants, led by Nelyub. Nelyub continues to oppose Minin’s idea at a city meeting near the Kremlin, but Minin remains steadfast, suggesting they raise money for the militia. Suddenly, an old beggar appears in the square and gives Minin all his money, sparking a strong patriotic response. Eventually, the Second Volunteer Army is formed under Minin and Pozharsky, and they march toward Moscow.

Meanwhile, Polish King Sigismund Vasa learns of this and consults with the Jesuit de Mallo, who had previously delivered a letter to Orlov. The Jesuit suggests assassinating Pozharsky, and the Lithuanian hetman Yan Karol Khodkevich prepares to march on Moscow. Under persuasion, Stepan agrees to kill the prince and attempts to do so when Swedish mercenaries arrive at the Second Volunteer Army's camp. However, Roman, now among the militiamen, saves the prince, informing him of the activities of Prince Trubetskoy and Ataman Zarutsky, and the planned march to Moscow by Hetman Khodkevich. The prince continues his march. Meanwhile, Orlov infiltrates the camp of the First Volunteer Army and converses with Boyar Dmitry Trubetskoy and Ataman Ivan Zarutsky. The Second Volunteer Army advances to Moscow and defeats the forward units of the Lithuanian hetman. Khodkevich discusses his plans for the next day’s battle and is confident of victory. At the same time, the traitors Stepan and Orlov attempt to sneak a group of Poles into Moscow but fall into an ambush set by Prince Pozharsky. Roman kills Orlov and orders Stepan’s execution.

The next morning, a fog temporarily covers Moscow, and the militia’s cavalry crosses the river as the decisive battle begins. Prince Pozharsky sets up artillery at Zotov's fortified positions and addresses his army. Meanwhile, Hetman Khodkevich, now supported by Swedish mercenaries, orders an attack. The militia's gunners and archers open fire on the Poles, and a hand-to-hand combat ensues between the militia, armed with halberds, and the mercenaries. Khodkevich attempts to help his troops with reinforcements, but it is in vain. The Polish hussars strike the militia’s positions, dealing a severe blow. Dissatisfied with waiting, the Cossacks switch sides and join the militia, while Polish garrison soldiers in the Kremlin fire cannons and emerge from the gates with banners and joyful songs. Pozharsky and Minin devise a plan to defeat the enemy, launching a counterattack led by the militia cavalry, which breaks the Polish formations. Khodkevich flees the battlefield, and his defeated forces retreat in disgrace. The Polish garrison in the Kremlin surrenders, and the militia enters Moscow victorious.

The film ends with a speech by Minin and Pozharsky to the people at the Lobnoye Mesto.

== Cast ==
- Aleksandr Khanov as Kuzma Minin
- Boris Livanov as Prince Dmitri Pozharsky
- Boris Chirkov as Ra Hetman Jan Karol Chodkiewicz
- Lev Sverdlin as Grigori Orlov
- Vladimir Moskvin as Stepan Khoroshev, stablehand-conspirator
- Sergei Komarov as Count Vasili Andreyevich Trubetskoi
- Yevgeny Kaluzhhky as Ivan Zarutsky
- Lev Fenin as Lt. Smith, Swedish mercenary
- Mikhail Astangov as King Sigismund III of Poland
- Ivan Chuvelyov as Peasant Conspirator-Leader
- Vladimir Dorofeyev as Ovtsyn
- Yelizaveta Kuzyurina as Pozharskaya
- Nina Nikitina as Palashka
- Pyotr Sobolevsky as Anokha, peasant
- Yevgeni Gurov as Jesuit de Mallo
- Mikhail Gluzsky as Pozharsky's servant
- Andrei Fajt as Polish man
