= Ferenc Szabó (composer) =

Hungarian composer (1902–1969)

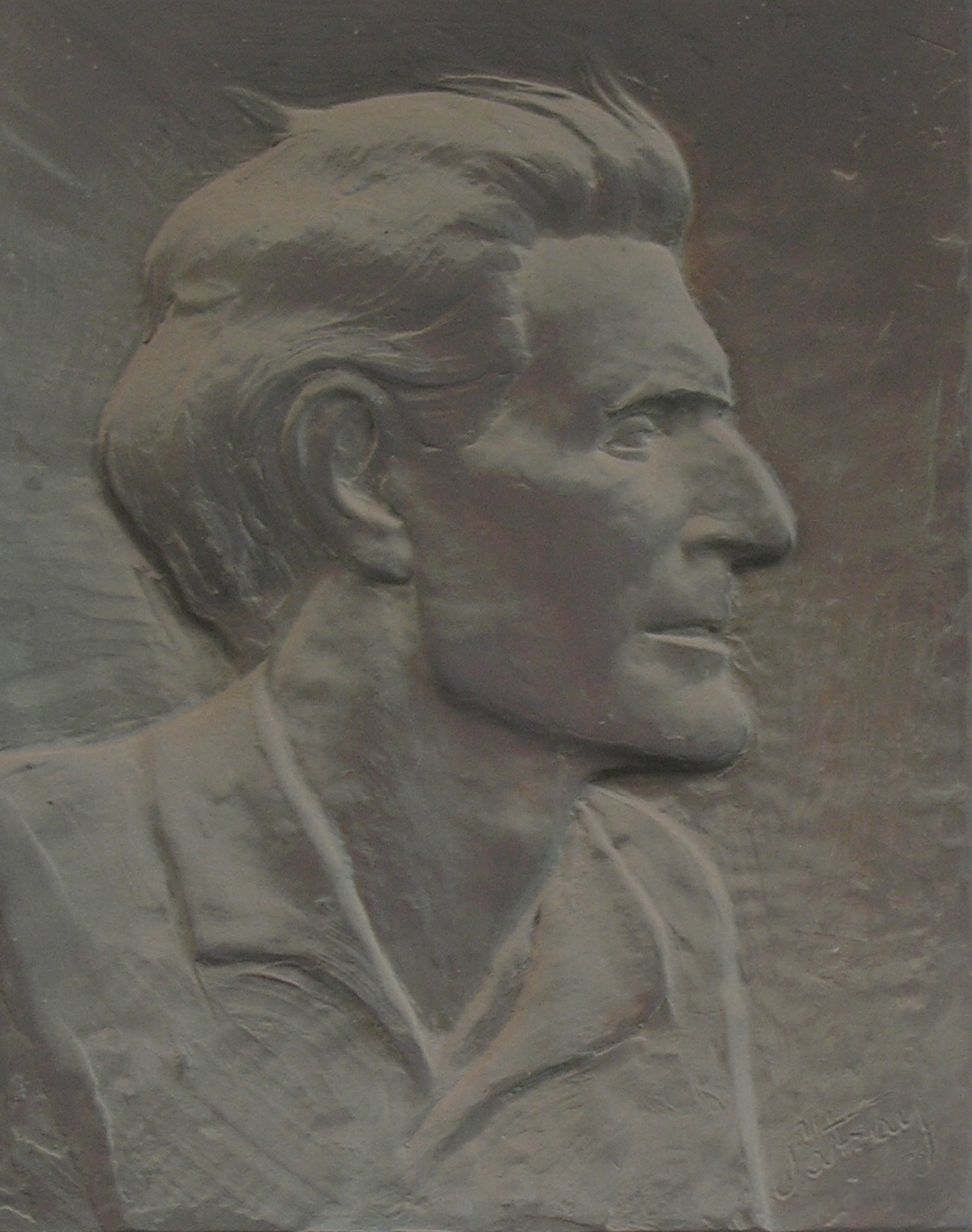
Ferenc Szabó

Ferenc Szabó (Hungarian: [ˈsɒboː ˈfɛrɛnt͡s], 27 December 1902, Budapest – 4 November 1969, Budapest) was a Hungarian composer. As a communist, Szabó was obliged to emigrate through Berlin (1931) to the USSR (1932). He became a respected figure in Soviet musical life, and found the opportunities to explore common ground between the concert hall and mass music-making on a far higher level. Besides composing a number of mass songs and film scores (notably for Erwin Piscator's Revolt of the Fishermen (1934), and Lúdas Matyi (1949)), he transcribed the Sinfonietta, originally for chamber orchestra, for an orchestra of domrï (plucked folk instruments). He wrote numerous orchestral works as well and one opera, Légy jó mindhalálig (1969).

He was and remained a committed and staunch Stalinist till the end of his life, and composed many works lauding Soviet premier Joseph Stalin and his accomplishments. Eventually he fell out of favor with the Hungarian Communist Party after his accusations as an informer during the show trials in Moscow in the 1930s became better known. As a result of his accusations a number of fellow Communist Party members had been executed by Stalin's secret police. He was stripped unceremoniously of all his public posts and died in obscurity.

== Sources ==
- János Maróthy. The New Grove Dictionary of Opera, edited by Stanley Sadie (1992), ISBN 0-333-73432-7, 1-56159-228-5
