= Zhukovsky (film) =

1950 film by Vsevolod Pudovkin and Dmitri Vasilyev

- Directed by: Vsevolod Pudovkin; Dmitri Vasilyev
- Written by: Anatoli Granberg
- Starring: Yuri Yurovsky
- Cinematography: Anatoli Golovnya; Tamara Lobova
- Music by: Vissarion Shebalin
- Production company: Mosfilm
- Release date: 13 July 1950
- Running time: 90 minutes
- Country: Soviet Union
- Language: Russian

Zhukovsky (Russian: Жуковский) is a 1950 Soviet biopic directed by Vsevolod Pudovkin and Dmitri Vasilyev, based on the life of Russian scientist Nikolai Zhukovsky (1847–1921), the founding father of modern aero- and hydrodynamics. In 1950 Pudovkin received the Best Director award at the 5th Karlovy Vary International Film Festival for this film. In 1951 Pudovkin, Shebalin, Golovnya, and Belokurov received the Stalin Prize.

== Plot ==
The film explores the life and achievements of Nikolay Yegorovich Zhukovsky, a pioneering scientist and the father of modern aerodynamics. During the early days of aviation, when many pilots lost their lives due to the flaws in aircraft design, Zhukovsky’s experiments were seen as extraordinarily risky. However, he found a brave ally in military pilot Pyotr Nesterov, who became the first in the world to perform the famous "loop-the-loop," now known as the "Nesterov Loop."

Zhukovsky laid the foundation for modern aerodynamics, developing calculations that enabled the construction of safer flying machines. In a conversation between Dmitri Mendeleev and Zhukovsky, Mendeleev recounts a soldier’s testimony about witnessing Alexander Mozhaysky's successful airplane test. The film dramatizes this unrealized flight and criticizes the tsarist government for abandoning research into heavier-than-air flight due to bureaucratic rigidity and reliance on foreign authorities.

The film portrays Dmitry Ryabushinsky in a negative light, reflecting the Soviet Union's disdain for prominent figures of the Russian emigration. Although Riabouchinsky was recognized internationally for his scientific contributions—being elected a corresponding member of the Paris Academy of Sciences—he is depicted not as a scientist but as a self-serving entrepreneur. His incompetence is emphasized, including a scene where Zhukovsky abruptly silences Riabouchinsky during a discussion with students, highlighting his inability to contribute meaningfully to the conversation.

== Cast ==
- Yuri Yurovsky – Nikolai Zhukovsky
- Ilya Sudakov – Dmitri Mendeleev
- Vladimir Belokurov – Sergey Chaplygin
- Vladimir Druzhnikov – Pyotr Nesterov
- Sofiya Giatsintova – Anna Nikolaevna, Zhukovsky's Mother
- Mikhail Nazvanov – Dimitri Riabouchinsky
- Oleg Frelikh – Aleksandr Stoletov, professor of the Moscow university
- Rostislav Plyatt – journalist
- Georgi Yumatov – Kasyanov
