= Mother (1926 film) =

1926 film by Vsevolod Pudovkin

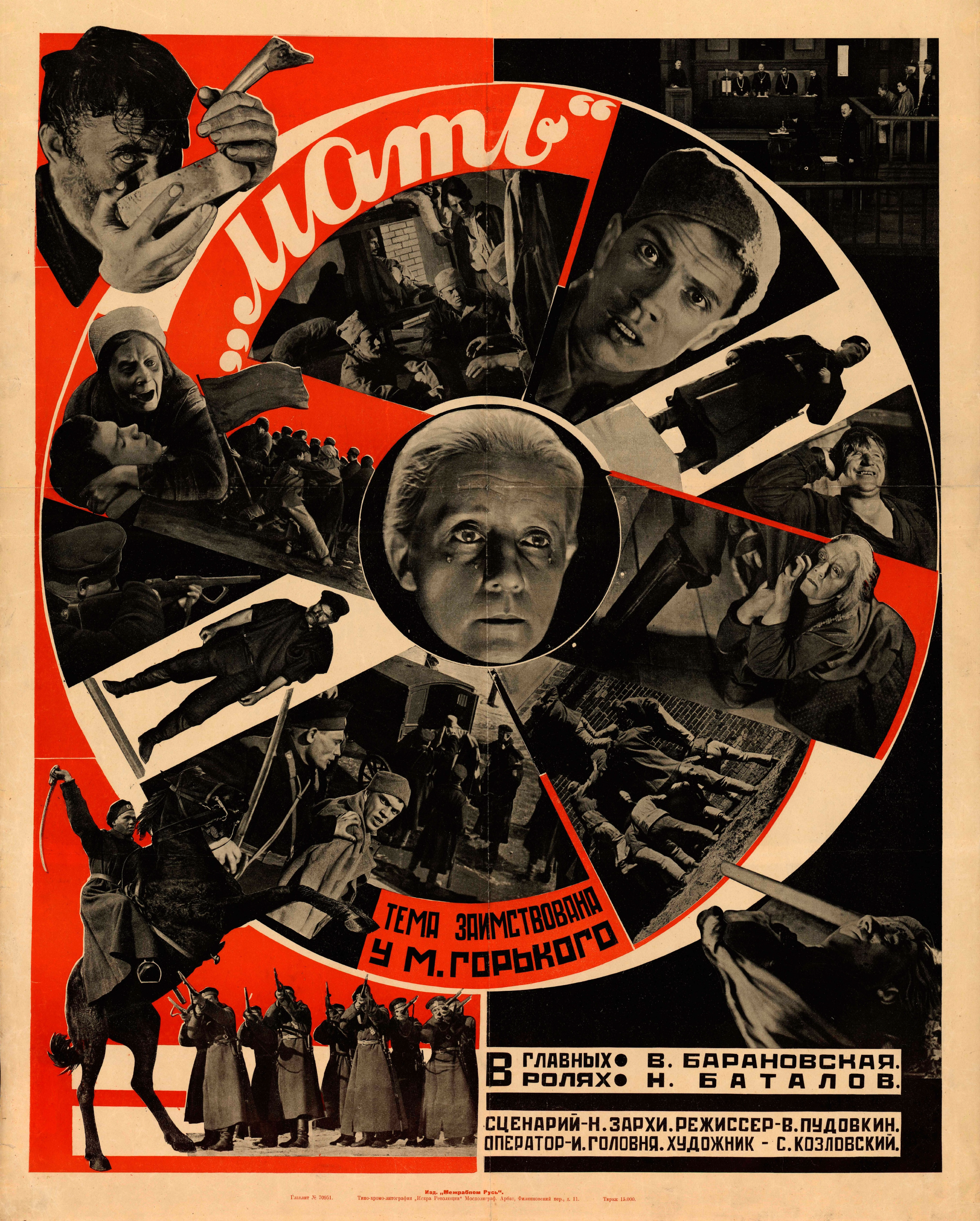
- Directed by: Vsevolod Pudovkin
- Written by: Nathan Zarkhi
- Based on: The Mother by Maxim Gorky
- Starring: Vera Baranovskaya; Nikolai Batalov
- Cinematography: Anatoli Golovnya
- Music by: David Blok (1935); Tikhon Khrennikov (1970)
- Production company: Mezhrabpomfilm
- Release date: 11 October 1926
- Running time: 89 minutes
- Country: Soviet Union
- Languages: Silent film Russian intertitles

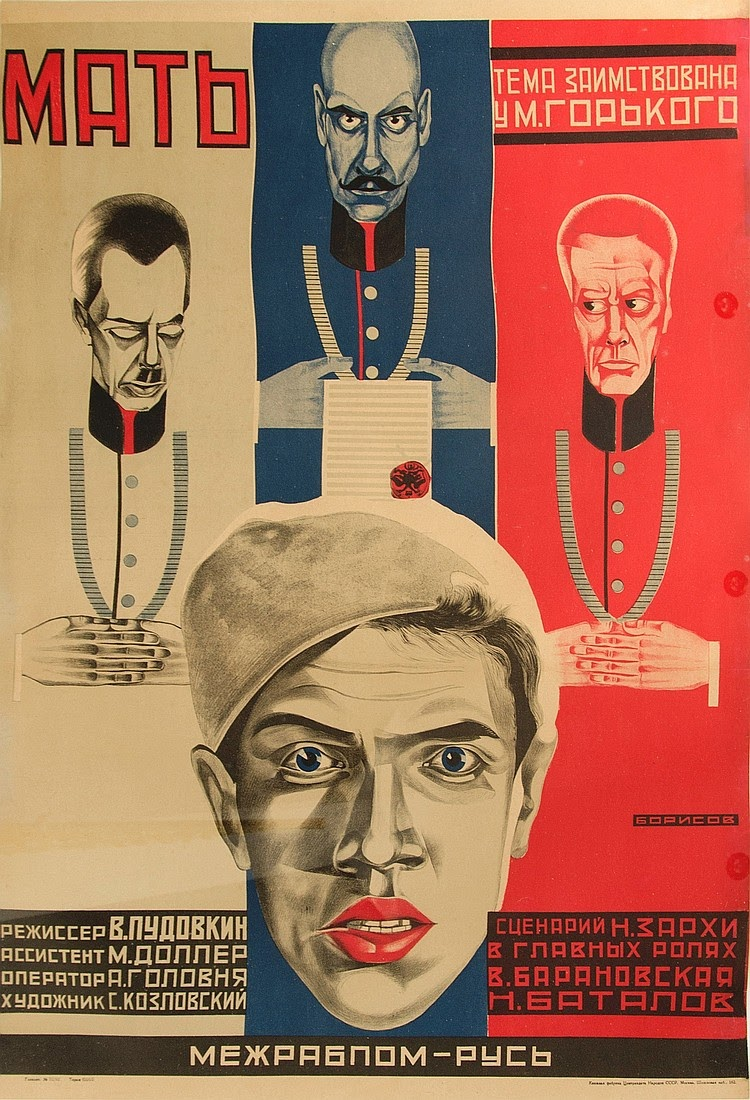
Poster by Grigory Borisov

Mother (Russian: Мать, Mat) is a 1926 Soviet drama film directed by Vsevolod Pudovkin. It depicts the radicalization of a mother, during the Russian Revolution of 1905, after her husband is killed and her son is imprisoned. Based on the 1906 novel The Mother by Maxim Gorky, it is the first installment in Pudovkin's "revolutionary trilogy", alongside The End of St. Petersburg (1927) and Storm Over Asia (aka The Heir to Genghis Khan) (1928). It received positive reviews from critics.

== Plot summary ==
Mother (1926)

Russia, 1905. Vlasov is a pipefitter at a factory, an alcoholic, and an abusive husband and father. His long-suffering wife, Pelageya, is protected by their adult son, Pavel. Pavel later agrees to hide a small cache of handguns for local revolutionary socialists under the floorboards of the family home. His mother secretly observes this. Vlasov — a large, hulking man — is plied with vodka by agents of the Black Hundred, a reactionary group, who plan to use him as a thug against the instigators of a planned workers' strike at the factory. During the mayhem of the failed strike, Vlasov is accidentally shot to death by a revolutionary. Pelageya is devastated and pleads with her son to cooperate with the Tsarist police and army who are pressing his case. He refuses. Naively thinking that revealing her son's hidden cache will redeem him, Pelageya betrays her son's secret to the authorities. He is, nevertheless, arrested and tried for sedition under the cool gaze of a bust of Nicholas II and the contemptuous glare of local bourgeois society. His judges are bored with the proceedings and his defense council is incompetent. He receives a sentence of heavy labor for life. Pelageya now makes common cause with the revolutionaries who are planning to foment a prison break during a May Day protest. In the prison yard, the inmates overwhelm the guards and escape. Pavel escapes separately and makes a daring flight across the river on ice floes while under fire. Pavel and his mother are briefly reunited, but he is shot dead by Tsarist troops in the very act of embracing her. Now thoroughly radicalized, Pelageya becomes a defiant standard-bearer holding aloft the socialist flag and is gloriously trampled to death under the hooves of a cavalry charge. A final montage presents images of fortresses, churches, factories and, lastly, the battlements and towers of the Kremlin with the same flag waving triumphantly on top.

== Cast ==
- Vera Baranovskaya as Pelageya Nilovna Vlasova, the Mother
- Nikolai Batalov as Pavel Vlasov, the Son
- Aleksandr Chistyakov as Vlasov, the Father
- Anna Zemtsova as Anna, a Revolutionary Girl
- Ivan Koval-Samborsky as Vessovchtchnikov, Pavel's Friend
- Vsevolod Pudovkin as Police Officer
- V. Savitsky as Isaik Gorbov, the Foreman
- N. Vidonov as Misha, a Worker
- F. Ivanov as Prison Warden (uncredited)
- Ivan Bobrov as Young Prisoner (uncredited)
- Vladimir Uralsky as Student (uncredited)
- Aleksandr Gromov as Revolutionary (uncredited)

== Style ==
Pudovkin wrote in his book Film technique and Film acting that "In my earlier film, Mother, I tried to affect the spectators, not by the psychological performances of an actor, but by plastic synthesis through editing." Grigori Roshal praised Pudovkin for his innovative style; "Being the first to introduce the idea of creating characterizations by means of montage in films, he has done in the cinema what Dickens did in novels."

== Reception and legacy ==
On the review aggregator website Rotten Tomatoes, Mother has a 100% approval rating based on 5 reviews, with an average rating of 8.50/10. The film was banned in the United Kingdom in 1930 after the Masses Stage and Film Guild applied for permission to screen it in London. The film was voted number 8 on the prestigious Brussels 12 list at the 1958 World Expo. In 1968, Mother underwent a restoration at Mosfilm, adding a soundtrack by Tikhon Khrennikov. In a 2008 survey by Seans magazine, film scholar Nikolai Izvolov and film critic Evgeniya Leonova respectively listed it sixth and fourth among their 10 favourite Russian films.
