= Mother (novel) =

1906 novel by Maxim Gorky

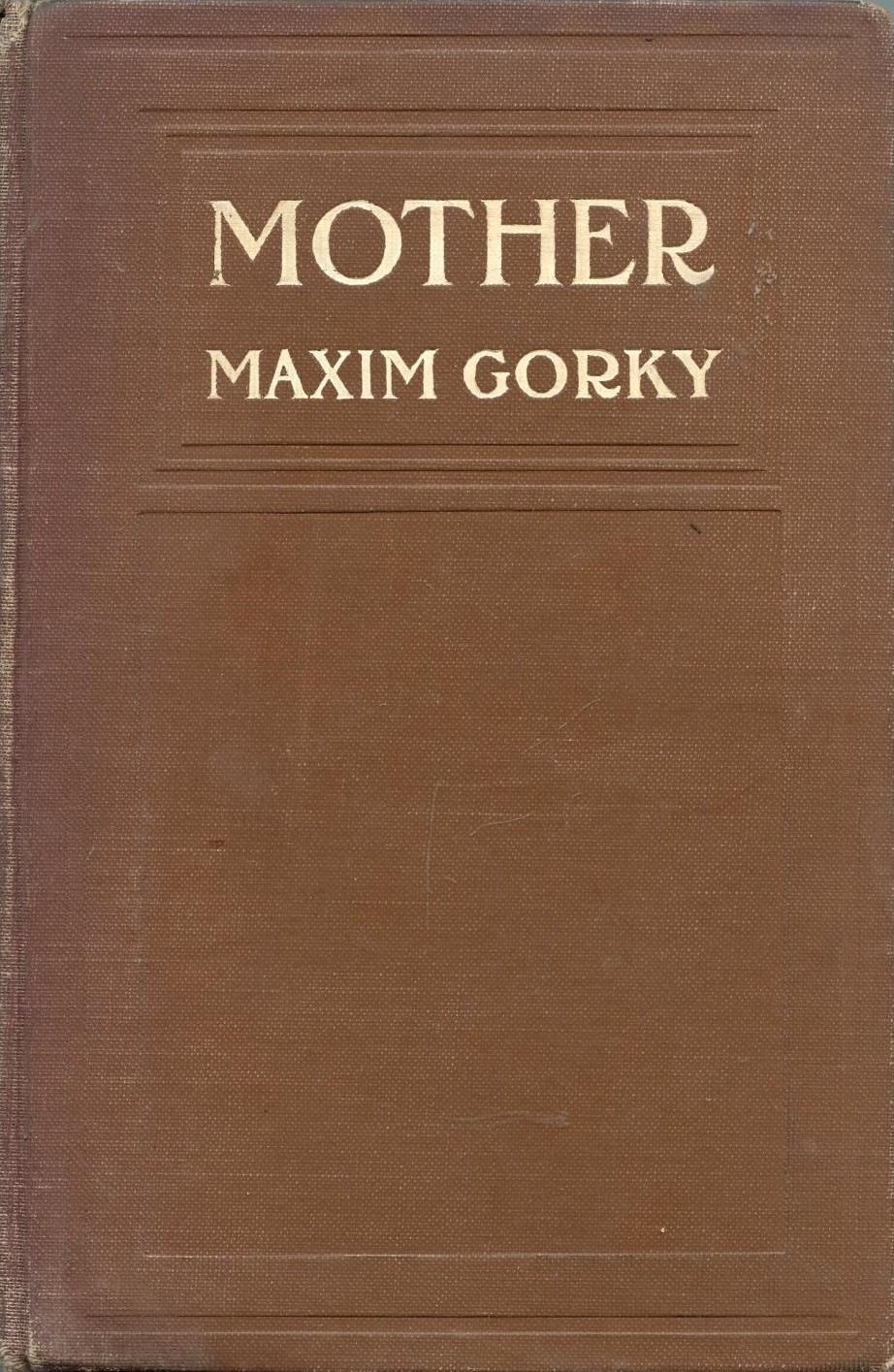
- First edition in United States (1907)
- Author: Maxim Gorky
- Original title: Мать
- Illustrator: Sigmund de Ivanowsky
- Language: Russian
- Genre: Political novel, social realism
- Publisher: D. Appleton & Company
- Publication date: 1907
- Publication place: United States
- English publication date: 1907
- Dewey Decimal: 891.733
- LC Class: PZ3.G678 M
- Original text: Мать at Russian Wikisource

Mother (Russian: Мать, romanized: Mat') is a novel written by Maxim Gorky in 1906 about revolutionary factory workers. It was first published, in English, in Appleton's Magazine in 1906, then in Russian in 1907.

Although Gorky was highly critical of the novel, the work was translated into many languages, and was made into a number of films. The German playwright Bertolt Brecht and his collaborators based their 1932 play The Mother on this novel. Modern critics consider it possibly the least successful of Gorky's novels; however, they call it Gorky's most important novel written before 1917.

== Background ==
Gorky wrote the novel on a trip to the United States in 1906. The political agenda behind the novel was clear. In 1905, after the defeat of Russia's first revolution, Gorky tried to raise the spirit of the proletarian movement by conveying the political agenda among the readers through his work. He was trying to raise spirit among the revolutionaries to battle the defeatist mood.

Gorky was personally connected to the novel as it is based on real life events, revolving around Anna Zalomova and her son Pyotr Zalomov. Gorky, being a distant relative of Anna Zalomova who visited Gorky's family when he was a child, had a deeper connection to the story. The event took place during a May Day demonstration in Sormovo in 1902. The shipbuilding town of Sormovo was near Gorky's native town, Nizhny Novgorod, where after the arrest of Piotr Zalomov by tsarist police, his mother, Anna Zalomova followed him into revolutionary activity.

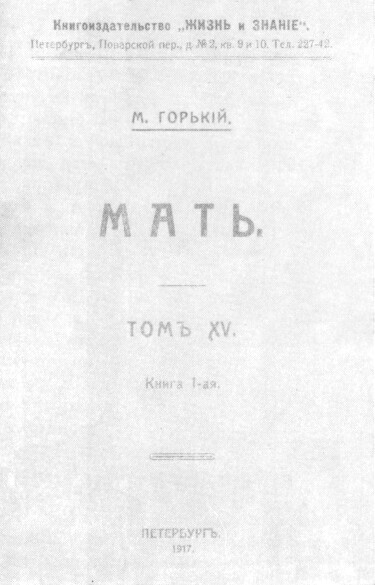
First Russian edition, 1917

The novel was first published by Appleton's Magazine in the US and later by Ivan Ladyzhnikov Publishers in Germany. In Russia, it was published legally only after the February Revolution because of the Tsarist censorship.

== Plot ==
In his novel, Gorky portrays the life of a woman whose husband and son work in a Russian factory doing hard manual labour. She has to combat poverty and hunger, among other hardships. Pelageya Nilovna Vlasova is the real protagonist; her husband, a heavy drunkard, physically assaults her and leaves all the responsibility for raising their son, Pavel Vlasov, to her, but unexpectedly dies. Pavel noticeably begins to emulate his father in his drunkenness and stammer, but suddenly becomes involved in revolutionary activities. Abandoning drinking, Pavel starts to bring books and friends to his home. Being illiterate and having no political interest, Nilovna is at first cautious about Pavel's new activities. However, she wants to help him. Pavel is shown as the main revolutionary character; the other revolutionary characters of the novel are Vlasov's friends, the anarchist peasant agitator Rybin and the Ukrainian Andrey Nakhodka, who expresses the idea of Socialist internationalism. Nevertheless Nilovna, moved by her maternal feelings and, though uneducated, overcoming her political ignorance to become involved in revolution, is considered the true protagonist of the novel.

== Popular and critical reception ==
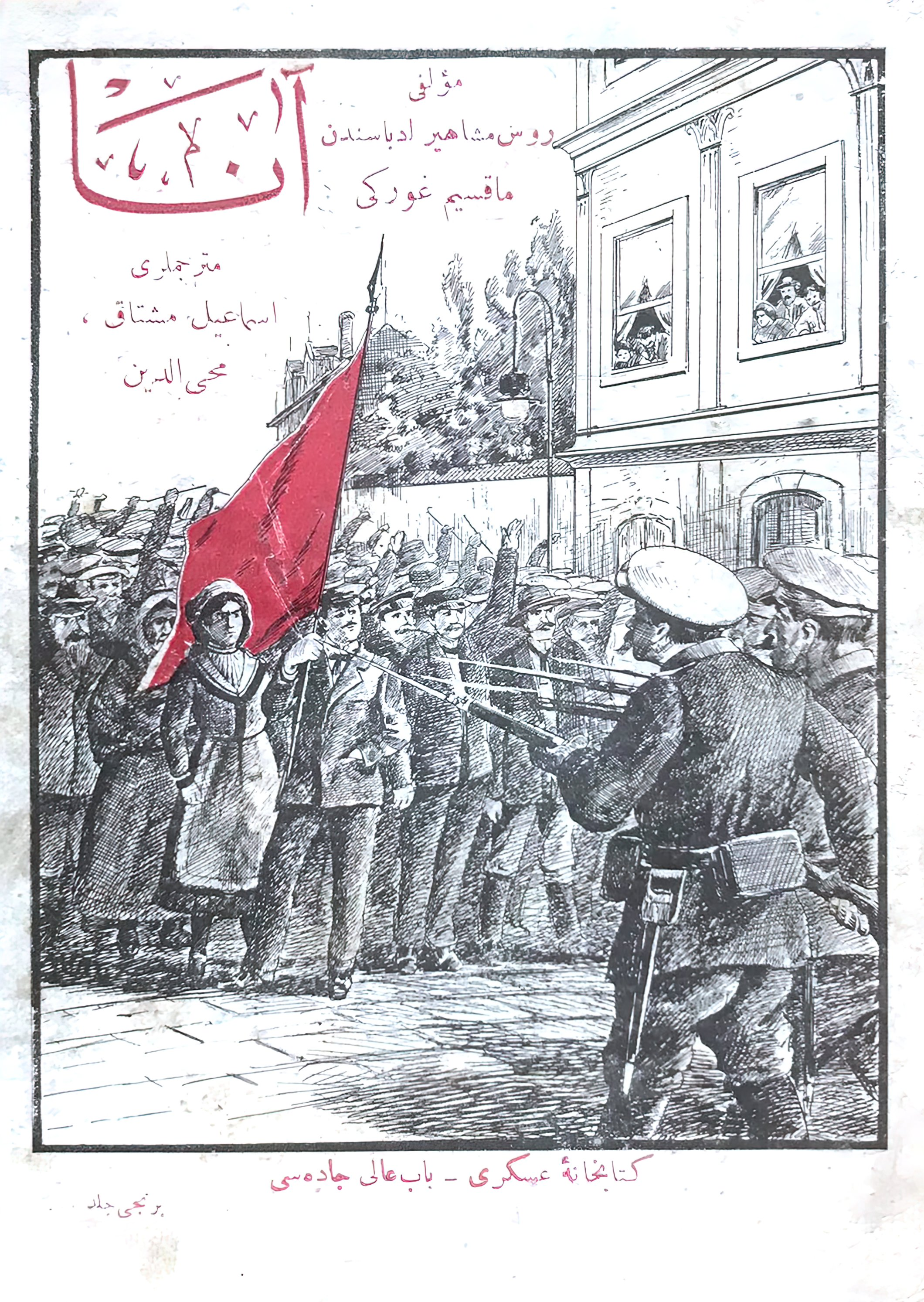
Cover of the 1911 Ottoman Turkish translation

Mother is the only big novel of Gorky on the Russian revolutionary movement; however, of all his novels, it is possibly the least successful. Nevertheless, it remains the best known work of Gorky among the author's other novels. Modern critics consider it Gorky's most important pre-revolutionary novel as it is his only long work devoted to the Russian revolutionary movement and because of the vivid image of his "God-Builder" ideas. As Richard Freeborn writes, it is important, as it is his only work, written specifically about the proletariat during the proletarian revolution. More to it, while Gorky's other works are more or less autobiographical, in Mother Gorky "moved nearly towards pure fictional invention."

After Gorky's return to the Soviet Union, the novel was declared by authorities as "the first work of Socialist realism", and Gorky as its "founder". Nevertheless, Gorky himself was highly critical of Mother, saying that it was "an unsuccessful thing, not only in its external appearance, because it is long, boring and carelessly written, but chiefly because it is insufficiently democratic."

Numerous artistic flaws of Mother and Gorky's other novels, written before 1910 have been widely described in reviews and critical essays by Korney Chukovsky, Andrei Sinyavsky, Ilya Serman, Marylin Minto and many others. As Minto notes, Nilovna's portrayal is very successful, but the other characters are one-dimensional. Freeborn notes that the other characters are little more than "eloquent mouthpieces" of their points of view, although Gorky fixes the flaw by projecting them through Nilovna's apprehension of them.

== Themes ==
The Bolsheviks praised the novel as a paean to socialist ideals, but its message encompasses more than mere class struggle. It is full of Biblical allusions: the revolutionaries are portrayed as saints, ready for martyrdom; Pavel speaks with 'the ardour of a disciple'; the Gospels are quoted to convey ideas about truth-searching. 'They’ve deceived us with God too!' says one of the characters before leaving the factory to go around villages, determined to open people’s eyes to the way they are being exploited: by the priests, the authorities, the 'gentlefolk'. 'People won't believe the naked word — suffering's needed, the word has to be washed in blood,' he warns, his words sounding especially ominous now, after a century of revolutions. The book's central theme is the mother's awakening from a life of fear and ignorance...

— The Spectator, 2016

== Adaptations ==
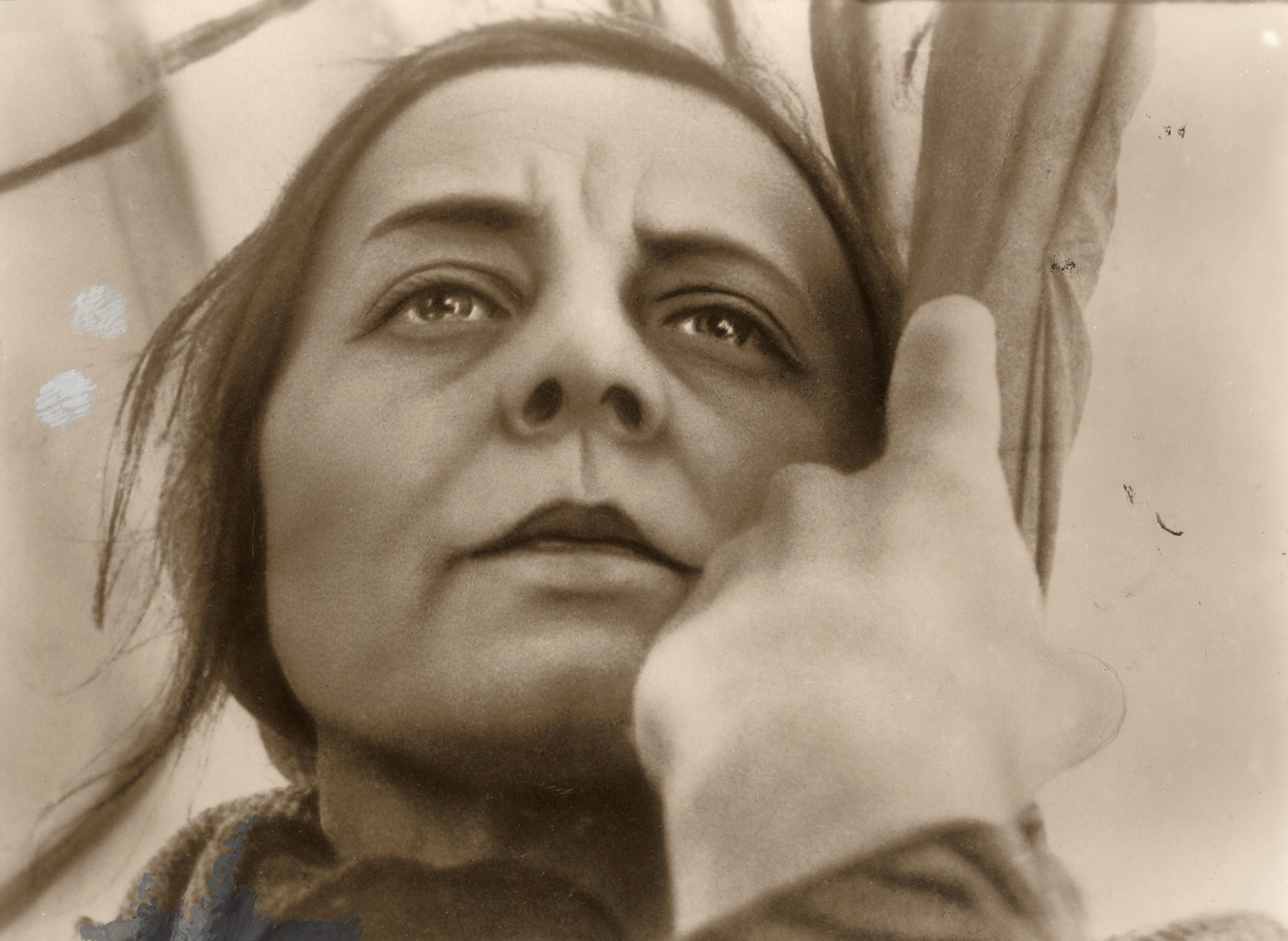
Vera Baranovskaya as Pelageya Vlasova in Mother (1926)

Being considered one of the most influential novels of the century worldwide, Mother was made in 1926 into a silent film under Vsevolod Pudovkin's direction with the same name. In the following years, in 1932 the novel was dramatized into a play by German playwright Bertolt Brecht in Die Mutter. In the later years, the novel was adapted in two other films of the same name; Mark Donskoy's Mother which released in 1955 and Gleb Panfilov's Mother (1990). Ilaignan, a 2011 Indian Tamil-language period action film directed by Suresh Krishna is based on the novel.

== English translations ==
- 1906: anonymous, D. Appleton & Company, public domain
- 1947: Isidore Schneider
- 1949: Margaret Wettlin
- 2016: Hugh Aplin (published by Alma Books)
