= Suvorov (film) =

1941 film by Mikhail Doller, Vsevolod Pudovkin

- Film poster
- Directed by: Vsevolod Pudovkin; Mikhail Doller
- Written by: Georgiy Grebner; Nikolai Ravich
- Starring: Nikolai Cherkasov-Sergeyev; Aleksandr Khanov; Mikhail Astangov
- Cinematography: Anatoli Golovnya; Tamara Lobova
- Music by: Yuri Shaporin
- Production company: Mosfilm
- Release dates: 23 January 1941 (USSR); 19 September 1941 (U.S.)
- Running time: 2948 metres (108 minutes)
- Country: Soviet Union
- Language: Russian

Suvorov (Russian: Суворов) is a 1941 Soviet film directed by Vsevolod Pudovkin and Mikhail Doller, based on the life of Russian general Alexander Vasilyevich Suvorov (1729 – 1800), one of the few great generals in history who never lost a battle. The film premiered in Russia 23 January 1941 (i.e., before the German invasion five months later). It was released as General Suvorov in the USA. In 1941 Pudovkin, Doller, Cherkasov-Sergeyev, and Khanov received the Stalin Prize for the film.

== Plot ==
The film begins with the Polish campaign following the Battle of Sokółka, a relevant event in light of Poland's defeat in 1939. The narrative then explores Suvorov's conflicts with Emperor Paul I, his reinstatement from exile in Konchanskoye, and the dramatic events of the Swiss campaign. During this campaign, a spy infiltrates Suvorov's headquarters but is exposed and executed. The film culminates with the iconic storming of the Devil's Bridge in Switzerland, highlighting Suvorov's indomitable leadership and tactical genius.

== Cast ==
- Nikolai Cherkasov-Sergeyev as Alexander Vasilyevich Suvorov
- Aleksandr Khanov as Platonych
- Mikhail Astangov as Aleksey Andreyevich Arakcheyev
- Apollon Yachnitsky as Pavel I
- Georgi Kovrov as Prokhor
- Sergey Kiligin as Pyotr Bagration
- Vsevolod Aksyonov as Meshchersky
- A. Antonov as Colonel Tyurin, commander of the Azov regiment
- Yuri Domogarov as Matvei Platov (uncredited)
- Anatoli Solovyov (actor) as Ivan Sinitsa (uncredited)
- А. Smirnov as Aleksey Gorchakov (uncredited)
- E. Gurov as Franz von Weyrother (uncredited)
- Galina Kravchenko as Lopukhina (uncredited)
