= Victory (1938 film) =

- Directed by: Vsevolod Pudovkin; Mikhail Doller
- Written by: Nathan Zarkhi; Vsevolod Vishnevsky
- Cinematography: Anatoli Golovnya
- Music by: Yuri Shaporin
- Production company: Mosfilm
- Release date: 1938
- Running time: 77 minutes
- Country: Soviet Union
- Language: Russian

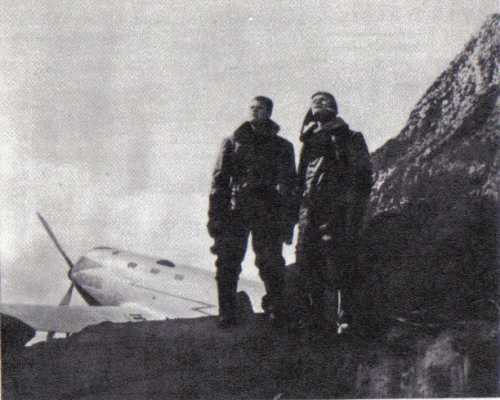
Frame from the movie "Victory" (USSR, 1938)

Victory (Russian: Победа, romanized: Pobyeda) is a 1938 Soviet drama film directed by Vsevolod Pudovkin and Mikhail Doller.

== Premise ==
The plot revolves around the round-the-world flight of three Soviet pilots.

== Cast ==
- Yekaterina Korchagina-Aleksandrovskaya - Mother Samoylova
- Vladimir Solovyov - Klim Samoylov, stratoplane pilot
- S. Ostroumov - Lomov
- N. Sanov - Gudiashvili
- Aleksandr Grechanyy - Gorelov
- L. Kalyuzhnaya - Liza, Klim's wife
- Z. Karpova - Anya
- Luka Lyashenko - Fomin
