= Mechanics of the Brain =

1926 film

- Directed by: Vsevolod Pudovkin
- Cinematography: Anatoli Golovnya
- Production company: Mezhrabpom-Rus
- Release date: 20 November 1926
- Running time: 90 minutes (1,850 metres)
- Country: Soviet Union

Mechanics of the Brain (Russian: Механика головного мозга, romanized: Myekhanika golovnogo mozga) is a 1926 Soviet documentary film directed by Vsevolod Pudovkin, a popularization of Ivan Pavlov's studies in classical conditioning. The picture is considered the first Russian popular science film. The motion picture is the first independent work of Pudovkin as a director and also marks the start of his collaboration with cinematographer Anatoli Golovnya.

Pudovkin joined Mezhrabpom-Rus film studio in 1925 and, as his first job, was assigned to make a popular science film about Ivan Pavlov's work. The filming started in May 1925 and proceeded for more than a year. The many delays were caused by constant shuttling between the Pavlov's laboratory in Leningrad and the film studio in Moscow as well as difficulties with filming conditioned animals who were easily distracted by the lights and sounds of the filming process.

The film depicts Pavlov's experiments on both animals and orphans, by a variety of methods, one of which was to implement a device to collect saliva into the orphans cheek.

Twenty years later, Pudovkin told an interviewer:

The only significance this first film of mine has is that it made me realize that I could work on my own. Up to then such idea seemed absolutely impossible to me, although Kuleshov assured me that I was fully able to...
