= Prokhor Dubasov =

Russian batman

Prokhor Ivanovich Dubasov (Russian: Прохор Иванович Дубасов; 1743—1823) was a Russian person, notable for serving as batman to general Alexander Suvorov from around 1760 until Suvorov's death. He appears in several literary and historical works related to the general and was known by the nickname 'Proshka'. Alexander I of Russia awarded Dubasov an annual pension of 1200 roubles. He is played in the film Suvorov by Georgy Kovrov.
