= The End of St. Petersburg =

1927 film

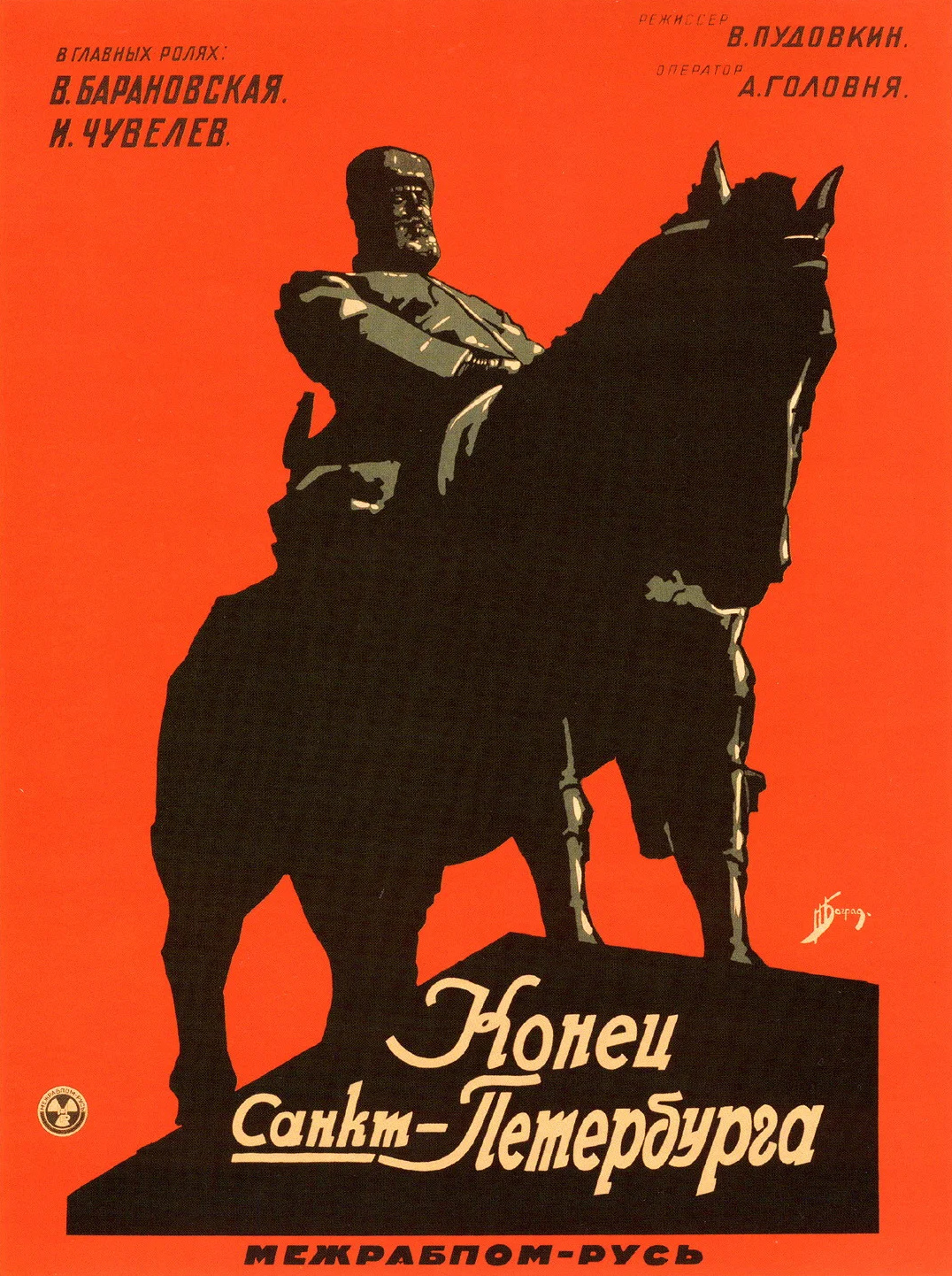
- Directed by: Vsevolod Pudovkin; Mikhail Doller
- Written by: Nathan Zarkhi
- Starring: Aleksandr Chistiakov; Vera Baranovskaia; Ivan Chuvelev; V. Obolenskii
- Cinematography: Anatoli Golovnya
- Distributed by: Mezhrabpom
- Release date: 14 December 1927
- Running time: 87 minutes (Kino DVD edition)
- Country: Soviet Union
- Languages: Silent film Russian intertitles

The End of St. Petersburg (Russian: Конец Санкт-Петербурга, romanized: Konets Sankt-Peterburga) is a 1927 silent drama film directed by Vsevolod Pudovkin and produced by Mezhrabpom. Commissioned to commemorate the tenth anniversary of the October Revolution, The End of St Petersburg was to be one of Pudovkin's most famous films and secured his place as one of the foremost Soviet montage film directors. A historical-political film, it covers a period from 1913-1917, including the injustice of the Tsar regime, the First World War, and the Bolsheviks's rise to power in 1917.

Political figures of the time are not shown; the emphasis is on the struggle of ordinary people for their rights and for peace against the power of capital and the autocracy. The film forms part of Pudovkin's 'revolutionary trilogy', alongside Mother (1926) and Storm Over Asia (aka The Heir to Genghis Khan) (1928). The film inspired the composer Vernon Duke to write his eponymous oratorio (completed in 1937).

The End of St. Petersburg (1927)

== Plot ==
A peasant boy leaves his rural community and arrives in St. Petersburg to obtain employment. He stays in the basement apartment of a Bolshevik worker. When the workforce at the Lebedev factory goes on strike, the Bolshevik worker's wife fears their family will starve.

The boy is offered a job in the Lebedev factory. He naively tells the management which employees started the strike, and he leads them to the Bolshevik worker's home. This results in the Bolshevik worker and his fellow communists being arrested. The boy is shocked by the consequences of his actions.

The boy goes to the factory office, hoping to convince the boss to free the Bolshevik worker. After a violent fight with the management, the boy is arrested and forcibly enlisted in the Imperial Russian Army. Meanwhile, the aristocracy decides to enter World War I.

The war continues for three years, during which the Russian military suffers many casualties. In 1917, the Imperial government has prioritized making weapons over feeding its people, and starving citizens riot. The Tsar is overthrown and the Provisional Government is instated, to the delight of the upper class.

The working class decides to overthrow the capitalist ministers. The Russian soldiers are called back from the front to support the Provisional Government and "save the Revolution from communist traitors." The Bolshevik worker appears as the soldiers get ready to march on the city. The boy appears and makes his way to the front and orders the soldiers to lower their weapons, which they obey. The Bolshevik worker convinces the military to join the Soviet cause.

The Soviets attack the Winter Palace and, after a violent battle, emerge victorious. The next morning, the wife comes looking for her husband. She shares potatoes with the soldiers and tends to the boy, who had been wounded. She is happily reunited with her husband in a church. The film declares "St. Petersburg is no more," and "Long live the City of Lenin."

== Cast ==
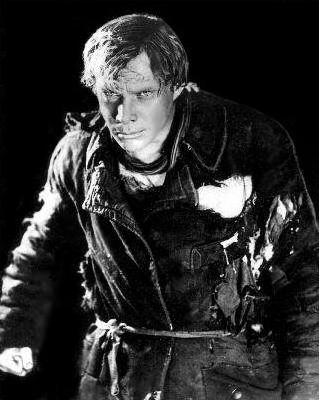
Ivan Chuvelev in film

- Alexander Chistyakov - Bolshevik worker
- Vera Baranovskaya - His wife
- Ivan Chuvelev - Peasant boy
- Sergey Komarov - Bailiff
- Nikolai Khmelyov - Speculator
- Alexander Gromov - Bald Bolshevik
- Vladimir Obolensky - Lebedev, manufacturer
- Mikhail Tereshkovich - Journalist
- Mark Tsibulskiy - Speculator
- Vladimir Chuvelev - Scab
- Vsevolod Pudovkin - Soldier (uncredited)
- Vladimir Fogel - German officer (uncredited)
- Serafima Birman - Lady with a fan (uncredited)
- Victor Tsoppi - Anti-German "patriot" in a top hat (uncredited)

== Reception ==
On the review aggregator website Rotten Tomatoes, The End of St. Petersburg has a 75% approval rating based on 8 reviews, with an average rating of 7.9/10.
