= Gorky Film Studio =

Film studio in Moscow, Russia (e. 1915)

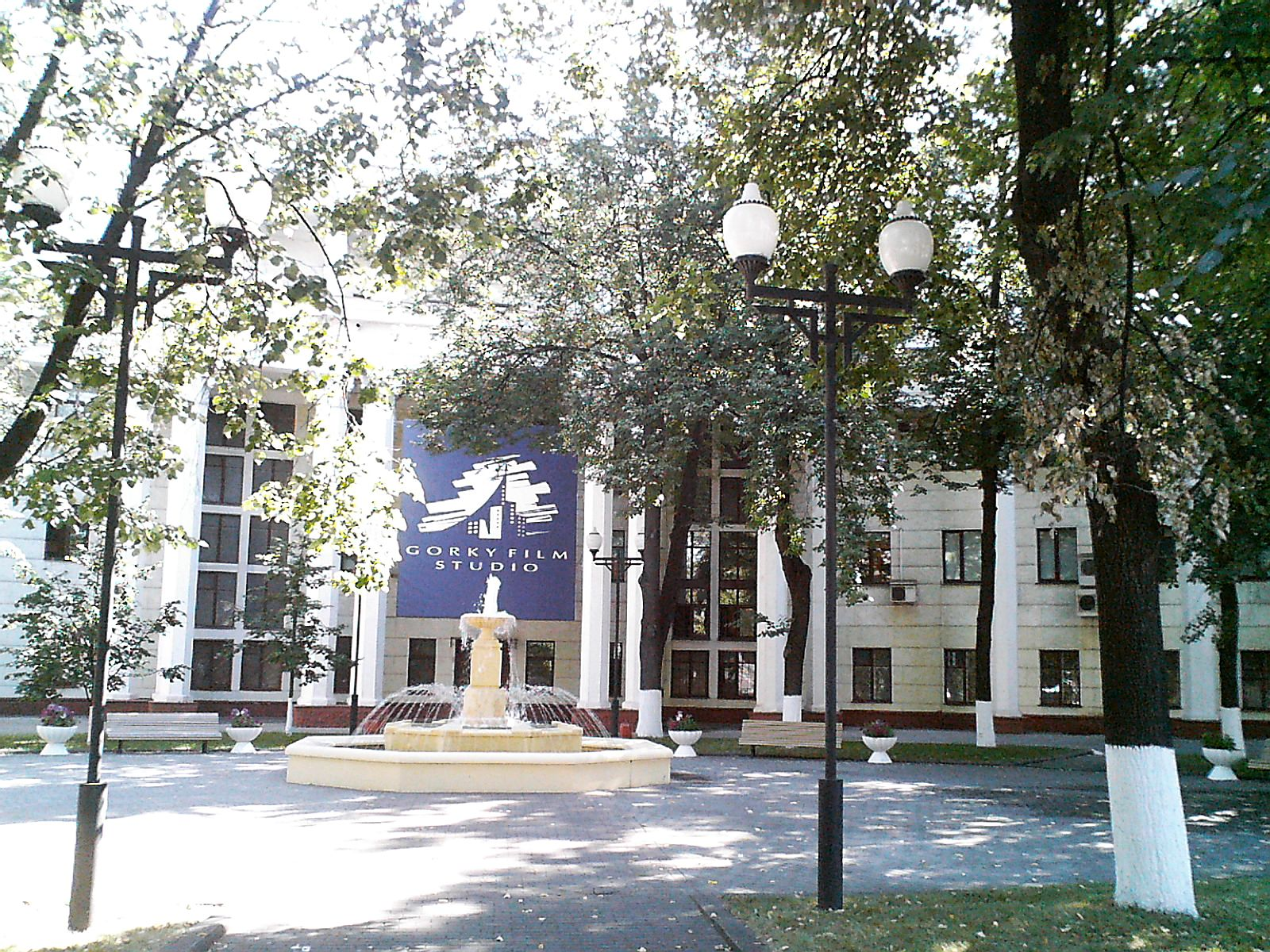
- Company type: Joint-stock company
- Industry: Motion pictures
- Founded: 1915; 111 years ago
- Headquarters: Moscow, Russia
- Key people: Yuliana Slashcheva (CEO); Lika Blank (general producer); Dmitry Pristanskov (chairman of the board of directors)
- Products: Motion pictures Television programs
- Owner: Government of Moscow
- Website: www.gorkyfilm.ru

Gorky Film Studio (Russian: Киностудия имени Горького) is a municipally-owned film studio in Moscow, Russia. By the end of the Soviet Union, Gorky Film Studio had produced more than 1,000 films. Many film classics were filmed at the Gorky Film Studio throughout its history and some of these were granted international awards at various film festivals. It is one of the oldest active film studios in Russia.

== History ==
In 1915, Mikhail Semenovich Trofimov, a merchant from Kostroma, established the Rus' film production unit (Russian: "Киноателье «Русь»") with studio facilities. In 1936, the studio was transferred to Butyrskaya Street in Moscow. The Rus' studio, employing many actors from Konstantin Stanislavski's Moscow Art Theatre, specialized in film adaptations of Russian classics (e.g., Tolstoy's Polikushka, 1919).

In 1924, the Rus' studio was renamed into the International Workers Relief agency (Russian: Международная рабочая помощь (Межрабпом)), abbreviated as Mezhrabpom-Rus' (Russian: Межрабпом-Русь). The first Soviet (sci-fi) film, Aelita, was filmed at this studio in 1924.

Four years later, the studio was renamed Mezhrabpomfilm (Russian: Межрабпомфильм), changing its name once again in 1936 to Soyuzdetfilm (Russian: Союздетфильм), the world's first film studio which specialized in films for children. The first Soviet sound film, Road to Life, was made there in 1931. Five years later, the first Soviet color film, Grunya Kurnakova, followed.

During World War II the film studio was evacuated to Dushanbe and merged with Tadjikfilm. Upon returning to Moscow, the studio was given the name of Maxim Gorky (in 1948). Between 1963 and 2004 its full name was Maxim Gorky Central Film Studio for Children and Youth (Russian: Центральная киностудия детских и юношеских фильмов им. М. Горького).

Since the 1950s, the Gorky Film Studio has been involved in dubbing foreign features.

By the end of the Soviet Union, Gorky Film Studio had produced more than 1,000 films. Many film classics were shot at Gorky Film Studio throughout its history and some of these were granted international awards at various film festivals.

Since 2015, the film studio has included the branches of the Central Studio of Popular Science and Educational Films (Tsentrnauchfilm) (Russian: Центрнаучфильм), Cinema and Photo Research Institute (NIKFI) (Russian: Научно-исследовательский кинофотоинститут (НИКФИ)), Lennauchfilm (Russian: Леннаучфильм).

In October 2019, Yuliana Slashcheva, chairman of the board of the SMF Studio (Soyuzmultfilm), was appointed General Director of the Gorky Film Studio.

According to the new development strategy approved by the board of directors in 2020, in the coming years, the Gorky Film Studio should sell non-core assets, restore the film studios, update the technical base and become a leader in Russia in the production of popular science and documentary films, feature films for young and family audiences, as well as a creative cluster for young directors, screenwriters and producers.

Since 2020, the Production Center of the Gorky Film studio has been completely updated. The studio has released several feature films with the support of the Ministry of Culture of the Russian Federation: the romantic comedy “No size love” (Russian: Любовь без размера), the teenage dramas “Firefly” (Russian: Светлячок) and “Freedom” (Russian: Я свободен).

Since 2020, the film studio has regularly held pitches for documentary filmmakers as part of the Gorky.Doc project, an annual Open call for feature film scriptwriters, film festivals, industrial conferences and exhibitions with the support of the Ministry of Culture of the Russian Federation. The film studio is the official organizer of the International festival of popular science films “World of knowledge” which is held annually in St. Petersburg. On December 10, 2020, the first annual industrial conference was organized. In 2020, the first annual film music festival – Soundtrack was held with the participation of the Moscow Production Center. In December 2020, an exhibition of costumes from movie fairy tales was opened at the film studio. At the same time, a film with fashion historian Alexandre Vassiliev about costumes in cinema "Believe in a Fairy Tale" (Russian: Поверить в сказку) was released.

On June 1, 2021, a VOD platform Kinopoisk HD has premiered a new educational series co-produced by Yandex and the Gorky Film Studio “I want to know everything!” (Russian: Хочу всё знать!). The series has become a modern version of the popular Soviet and Russian newsreel published by Tsentrnauchfilm. A theme song was written and performed by the singer – Monetochka.

15 new feature films, 40 documentary and popular science projects are currently in production and development.

In 2021, the film studio is working on a new film adaptation of Galina Shcherbakova's story "Could One Imagine?" (Russian: Вам и не снилось), a teenage drama with horror elements "Puppet master" (Russian: Кукольник), family comedies "Uncle from Chicago" (Russian: Дядя из Чикаго), "My Dad is the Сhieftain!" (Russian: Мой папа – вождь!) and other fiction full-length films.

In the fall, 2021, Gorky Film Studio is planning to open a museum and a film school, as well as a children's center as part of the GORKY PLUS project.

In November 2021, Russian prime-minister Mikhail Mishustin ordered to allocate more than 1,1 billion roubles to modernize old rooms, to build new facilities and to buy new equipment by 2026.

== Selected films and TV productions ==
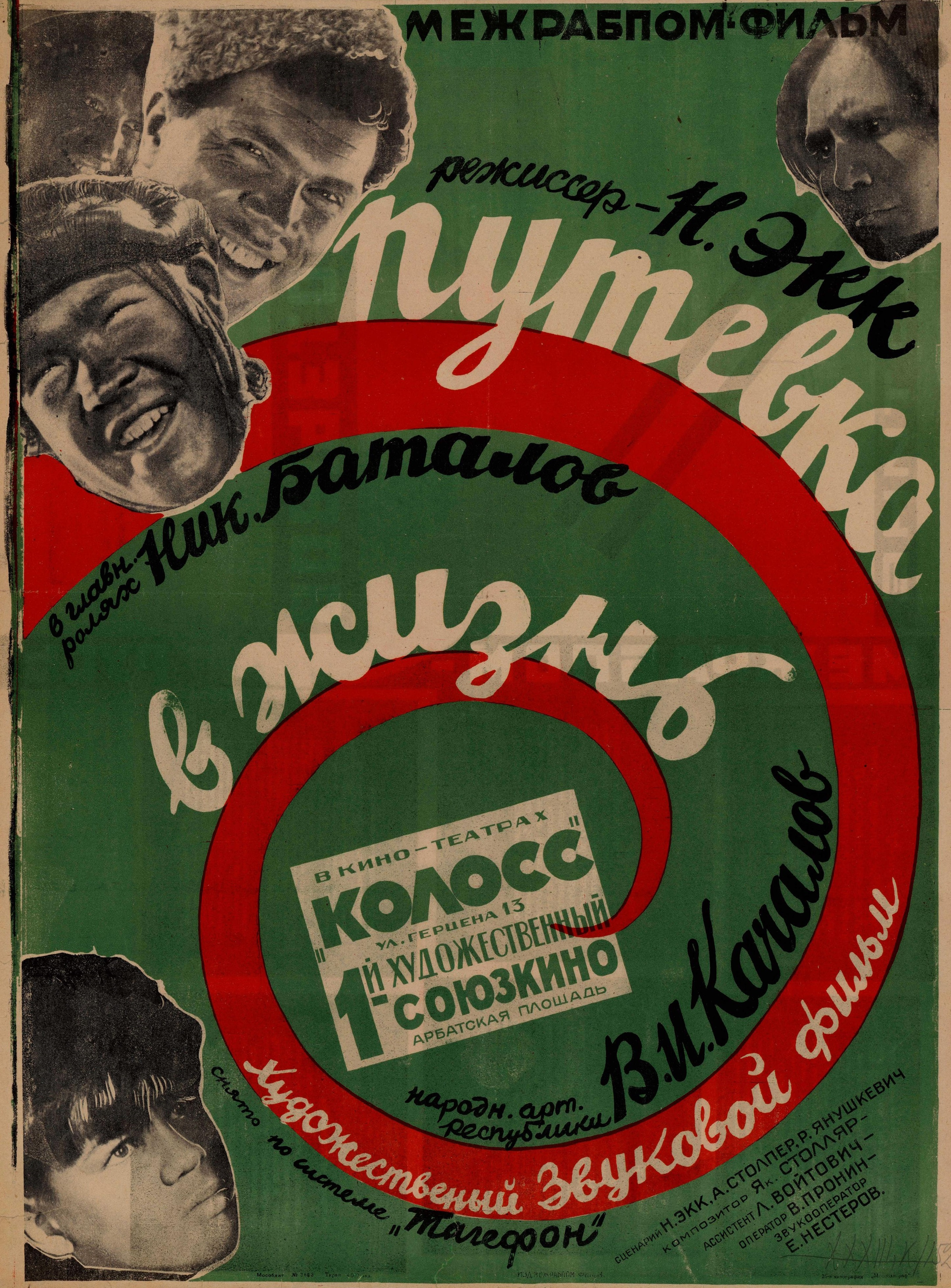
Poster of first Soviet sound film Road to Life (1931).

- 1924 Аэлита / Aelita (silent film), directed by Yakov Protazanov (science-fiction)
- 1926 Мать / Mother (silent film), directed by Vsevolod Pudovkin
- 1927 Конец Санкт-Петергбурга / The End of St. Petersburg (silent film), directed by Vsevolod Pudovkin
- 1931 Путевка в жизнь / Road to Life (first Soviet sound film), directed by Nikolai Ekk
- 1934 Восстание рыбаков / Revolt of the Fishermen (drama), directed by Erwin Piscator
- 1936 Груня Корнакова (Соловей-соловушко) / The Nightingale (first soviet color film), directed by Nikolai Ekk
- 1957 Дом, в котором я живу / The House I Live In (drama), directed by Lev Kulidzhanov
- 1964 Морозко / Jack Frost (fantasy film), directed by Alexander Rou
- 1967 Комиссар / Commissar (drama), directed by Aleksandr Askoldov
- 1973 Семнадцать мгновений весны / Seventeen Moments of Spring (war film), directed by Tatiana Lioznova (TV production)
- 1975 Тайна горного подземелья / The Mystery of the Mountain Dungeon (adventure film), directed by Lev Mirsky
- 1976 Несовершеннолетние / The Age of Innocence (youth drama film), directed by Vladimir Rogovoy
- 1981 Шестой / The Sixth One (ostern), directed by Samvel Gasparov
- 1984 Медный ангел / Copper Angel, directed by Veniamyn Dorman
- 1985 Гостья из будущего / Guest from the Future (science-fiction), directed by Pavel Arsenov (TV production)
- 1988 Маленькая Вера / Little Vera (drama), directed by Vasili Pichul
- 1988 Лиловый шар / Lilac Ball (science fiction), directed by Pavel Arsenov
- 1989 Подземелье ведьм / The Witches Cave (science-fiction), directed by Yuri Moroz
- 1989 Князь Удача Андреевич/ Prince Luck Andreevich (Mystery), directed by Gennadi Baisak
- 1999 Восемь с половиной долларов / 8 ½ $ (crime, comedy), directed by Grigori Konstantinopolsky
- 2004 Арье / Arie (drama), directed by Roman Kachanov
- 2022 Кукольник / The Doll Master (horror), directed by Sergey Kuznetsov and Roman Amsler
