= Vladimir Uralsky =

Russian actor

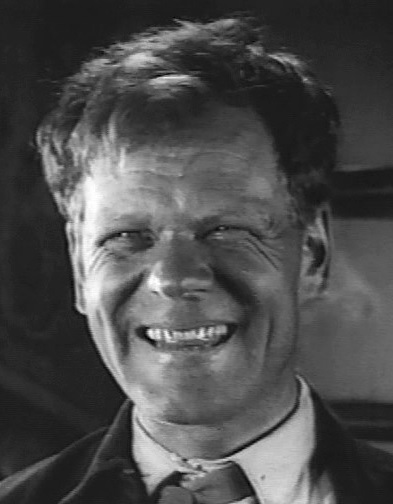
- Vladimir Uralsky in 1928.
- Born: Vladimir Mikhailovich Popov; 28 August 1887; Orenburg, Russian Empire
- Died: 15 May 1955 (aged 67); Moscow, Soviet Union
- Occupation: Actor
- Years active: 1924–1955
- Children: Viktor Uralsky

Vladimir Mikhailovich Uralsky (Russian: Владимир Миха́йлович Уральский) was a Russian and Soviet stage and film actor. Uralsky appeared in more than 100 films.

== Selected filmography ==
- 1924 — Aelita
- 1925 — Strike
- 1925 — Battleship Potemkin
- 1928 — Zvenigora
- 1930 — St. Jorgen's Day
- 1939 — The Fighters
- 1946 — The Great Glinka
- 1948 — The Young Guard
- 1948 — First-Year Student
