= Vsevolod Pudovkin =

Soviet-Russian film director, screenwriter and actor

- Всеволод Пудовкин
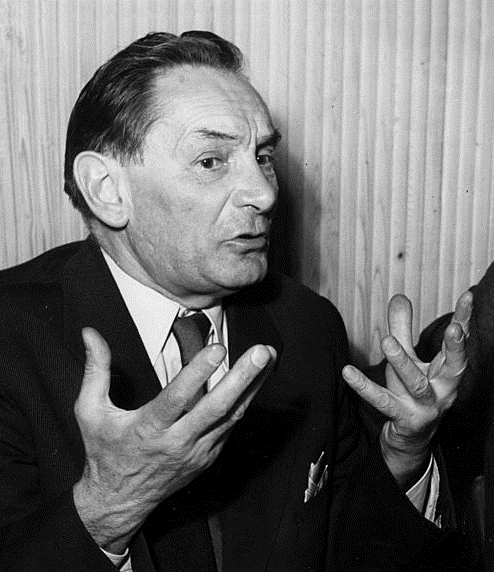
- Pudovkin in Italy, 1951
- Born: 28 February 1893; Penza, Penza Governorate, Russian Empire
- Died: 30 June 1953 (aged 60); Dubulti, Jūrmala, Latvian SSR, Soviet Union
- Education: Moscow State University
- Occupations: Film director; screenwriter; actor; pedagogue
- Years active: 1921–1953

Vsevolod Illarionovich Pudovkin (Russian: Всеволод Илларионович Пудовкин, IPA: [ˈfsʲevələt ɪl(ː)ərʲɪˈonəvʲɪtɕ pʊˈdofkʲɪn]; 28 February 1893 – 30 June 1953) was a Soviet film director, screenwriter and actor who developed influential theories of montage. Pudovkin's masterpieces are often contrasted with those of his contemporary Sergei Eisenstein; Eisenstein utilized montage to glorify the power of the masses, while Pudovkin preferred to concentrate on the courage and resilience of individuals. He was granted the title of People's Artist of the USSR in 1948.

== Biography ==
Vsevolod Pudovkin was born in Penza into a Russian family, the third of six children. His father Illarion Yepifanovich Pudovkin came from peasants of the Penza Governorate, the village of Shuksha and worked in several companies as a manager and a door-to-door salesman. Vsevolod's mother Yelizaveta Aleksandrovna Pudovkina (née Shilkina) was a housewife.

A student of engineering at Moscow University, Pudovkin saw active duty during World War I, being captured by the Germans. During this time he studied foreign languages and did book illustrations. After the war, he abandoned his professional activity and joined the world of cinema, first as a screenwriter, actor and art director, and then as an assistant director to Lev Kuleshov.

In 1924, he married Anna Zemtsova. Pudovkin asserted that his wife encouraged him for pursuing a career as a filmmaker.

His first notable work was a comedy short Chess Fever (1925) co-directed with Nikolai Shpikovsky. José Raúl Capablanca played a small part in it, with a number of other cameos presented. In 1926 he directed what would become one of the masterpieces of silent movies: Mother, where he developed several montage theories that would make him famous. Both movies featured Pudovkin's wife Anna Zemtsova in supporting female parts (she left cinema shortly after).

The film is not shot, but built, built up from the separate strips of celluloid that are its raw material.

— Vsevolod Pudovkin

His first feature was followed by The End of St. Petersburg (1927), and Storm over Asia (also known as The Heir of Genghis Khan, 1928), titles which compose a trilogy at the service of the bolshevik revolutionary policy.

In 1928, with the advent of sound film, Pudovkin, Sergei Eisenstein and Grigori Aleksandrov signed the Manifest of Sound, in which the possibilities of sound are debated, and always understood as being in a state of tension and nonsynchronization with the image. This idea would be brought to bear in his next pictures: A Simple Case (1932) and The Deserter (1933), works that do not match the quality of earlier work. The Heir to Genghis Khan (or Storm over Asia; 1928). Pudovkin was publicly charged with formalism for his experimental sound film A Simple Case, which he was forced to release without its sound track. In 1935 he was awarded the Order of Lenin.

After an interruption caused by health concerns, Pudovkin returned to movie making, this time with a number of historical epics: Victory (1938); Minin and Pozharsky (1939) and Suvorov (1941). The last two were often praised as some of the best movies based on Russian history, along with the works of Sergei Eisenstein. Pudovkin was awarded Stalin Prize first degree for both of them in 1941.

During World War II he was evacuated to Kazakhstan where he directed several patriotic war movies. He also played a small part in the Ivan the Terrible movie (as God's fool). With the end of war he returned to Moscow and continued his work at the Mosfilm studio, making biographical and war movies. In 1947 he was awarded another Stalin Prize first degree for his work on Admiral Nakhimov, and in 1950 — his second Order of Lenin and Stalin Prize second degree for Zhukovsky. His last work was The Return of Vasili Bortnikov (1953).

Apart from directing, screenwriting and acting, Pudovkin was also an educator and a journalist, author of several books on film theory, professor at VGIK, president of the cinema section at VOKS (since 1944) and a member of the Soviet Peace Committee.

Vsevolod Pudovkin died on 30 June 1953 in Dubulti, Latvian SSR after a heart attack. He was buried at the Novodevichy Cemetery. One of the streets in Moscow is named after Pudovkin (see Pudovkin street).

== Filmography ==
Year	Original Title	English Title	Role	Notes
1920	В дни борьбы	In the Days of Struggle		Actor
1921	Серп и молот	Sickle and Hammer	Andrey	Screenwriter; assistant director
1921	Голод... голод... голод...	Hunger... Hunger... Hunger...		screenwriter; assistant director
1923	Слесарь и канцлер	Locksmith and Chancellor		Screenwriter
1924	Необычайные приключения мистера Веста в стране большевиков	The Extraordinary Adventures of Mr. West in the Land of the Bolsheviks	Shban	Art director
1925	Луч смерти	The Death Ray	Father Revo - Fascist Boss	Screenwriter; assistant director; art director
1925	Шахматная горячка	Chess Fever		Director (with Nikolai Shpikovsky)
1926	Механика головного мозга	Mechanics of the Brain		Director; screenwriter
1926	Мать	Mother	Police Officer	Director
1927	Конец Санкт-Петербурга	The End of St. Petersburg	German Officer	Director
1928	Потомок Чингиз-Хана	Storm over Asia		Director
1929	Живой труп	The Living Corpse	Fyodor Protasov	
1929	Веселая канарейка	The Happy Canary	Illusionist	
1929	Новый Вавилон	The New Babylon	Police intendent	
1932	Простой случай	A Simple Case		Director (with Mikhail Doller)
1933	Дезертир	The Deserter		Director
1938	Победа	Victory		Director (with Mikhail Doller)
1939	Минин и Пожарский	Minin and Pozharsky		Director (with Mikhail Doller)
1941	Суворов	Suvorov		Director (with Mikhail Doller)
1941	Пир в Жирмунке	Feast in Zhirmunka		Director (with Mikhail Doller)
1942	Убийцы выходят на дорогу	The Murderers are Coming		Director (with Yuri Tarich); screenwriter
1943	Во имя Родины	In the Name of the Fatherland	German General	Director (with Dmitri Vasilyev); screenwriter; actor
1943	Юный Фриц	The Young Fritz	Officer	Short, actor
1945; 1958	Иван Грозный	Ivan the Terrible	Nikola, Simpleton Beggar	Actor (final film role)
1947	Адмирал Нахимов	Admiral Nakhimov	Prince Menshikov	Director
1948	Три встречи	Three Encounters		Director (segment)
1950	Жуковский	Zhukovsky		Director
1952	Возвращение Василия Бортникова	The Return of Vasili Bortnikov		Director (with Dmitri Vasilyev)

== Published works ==
- Film Technique and Film Acting Grove Press. 1958.
