= List of Bulgarian films of the 1950s =

A list of the most notable films produced in Bulgaria during the 1950s ordered by year of release. For an alphabetical list of articles on Bulgarian films see Category:Bulgarian films.

== Number and awards ==
Bulgaria produced 39 films, either alone or with other countries, during the 1950s. Four of thоse (Geroite na Shipka in co-production with the Soviet Union, Tochka parva, Zemya and Sterne in co-production with East Germany) got a Golden palm nomination at the Cannes Film Festival. Geroite na Shipka (1955), Pod Igoto (1952) and Trevoga (1951) went on to become some of the most viewed Bulgarian films. Geroite na Shipka got 5,8 mill views and ranks second in the all-time Bulgarian rang-list, Pod Igoto is 5th with 5 mill views and Trevoga – 10th with 3,8 mill.

== Notable actors ==
The most notable actors from the period were Ivan Dimov ("Kalin orelat", "Pod igoto", "Geratzite"), Konstantin Kisimov ("Kalin orelat", "Pod igoto", "Tochka parva", "Geroite na Shipka") and Apostol Karamitev ("Pod igoto", "Geroite na Shipka", "Lyubimetz 13").

== List ==
Title	Title (Latin) English	Director	Length	Cast	Notes	IMDB link
1950
Калин Орелът	Kalin Orelat; Kalin the eagle	Boris Borozanov	89 min	Ivan Dimov, Boris Ganchev, Mariya Yasnikova and Konstantin Kisimov	Black and White drama	
1951
Тревога	Trevoga; Alarm	Zahari Zhandov	115 min	Stefan Savov and Nadya Stanislavova	Black and White drama about a Bulgarian family's tragedy during World War II	
Утро над родината	Utro nad Rodinata; Dawn Over the Homeland	Kamen Kalchev	82 min	Lubomir Kabakchiyev, Apostol Karamitev, Georgi Georgiev-Getz and Rangel Vulchanov	Black and White drama	
1952
Данка	Danka	Krastyu Belev	83 min	Milka Tuykova, Ivanka Dimitrova and Miroslav Mindov	Black and White Drama	
Наша земя	Nasha zemya Our land	Anton Marinovich and Stefan Surchadzhiev	103 min	Apostol Karamitev, Milka Tuykova, Georgi Georgiev-Getz, Iossif Surchadzhiev and Lubomir Kabakchiyev	Black and White Drama	
Под игото	Pod igoto Under the Yoke	Dako Dakovski	118 min	Miroslav Mindov, Lili Popivanova, Petar Dimitrov, Ivan Dimov and Konstantin Kisimov	Black and White Drama based on Ivan Vazov's novel of the same name	
1954
Граница	Granitza; The border	Nikola Minchev	21 min	Kunka Baeva, Ivan Bratanov and Georgi Georgiev-Gocheto	Short film	
Песен за човека	Pesen za choveka Song of Man	Borislav Sharaliev	111 min	Dinko Dinev, Ivan Bratanov, Apostol Karamitev and Leo Conforti	Black and White film based on the famous Nikola Vaptsarov poem	
Септемврийци	Septemvriytzi; Septembrists (The Heroes of September)	Zahari Zhandov	117 min	Asparuh Temelkov and Boris Ganchev	Black and White drama dedicated to the uprising, which broke out in Bulgaria in September 1923	
Снаха	Snaha; Daughter-In-Law	Anton Marinovich	116 min	Petar Dimitrov, Margarita Duparinova and Leo Conforti	Black and White drama based on novel	
1955
Героите на Шипка	Geroite na Shipka; Shipka Heroes	Sergei Vasilyev	137 min (123 min in the Soviet Union)	Ivan Pereverzev, Viktor Avdyushko and Apostol Karamitev	Black and White historical film about the Battle of Shipka Pass. Best director award and a Golden palm nomination at the Cannes Film Festival.	
Неспокоен път	Nespokoen pat Troubled Road, a Man Decides	Dako Dakovski	116 min	Ivan Bratanov, Tzvetana Nikolova, Georgi Georgiev-Getz and Petar Dimitrov	Black and White drama based on a novel by Stoyan Daskalov	
Празник	Praznik; Feast	Dimitar Petrov	24 min	Olga Kircheva, Mihail Dzhunov and Leo Conforti	a short black and white comedy	
1956
Две победи	Dve pobedi Two Victories	Borislav Sharaliev	92 min	Nikola Popov, Assen Milanov, Nikolina Lekova and Rangel Vulchanov	Black and White musical comedy	
Димитровградци	Dimitrovgradtsy; People of Dimitrovgrad	Nikola Korabov and Ducho Mundrov	109 min	Georgi Kaloyanchev, Mariya Rusalieva and Ivan Dimov	Black and White drama	
Една българка	Edna balgarka A Bulgarian Woman	Nikolay Borovishki	22 min	Penka Vasileva and Lyubomir Bobchevski	short black and white film based on Ivan Vazov's short novel	
Екипажът на Надежда	Ekipazhat na Nadezhda; The Crew from Nadezhda	Kiril Ilinchev	95 min	Nikola Marinov and Veselin Marinov	black and white drama	
Следите остават	Sledite ostavat The Traces Remain	Petar Vasilev	100 min	Stefan Danailov and Vera Dragostinova	black and white adventure comedy based on Pavel Vezhinov's novel	
Това се случи на улицата	Tova se sluchi na ulitzata It Happened in the Street	Yanko Yankov	87 min	Apostol Karamitev, Petrana Lambrinova and Leo Conforti	black and white comedy	
Точка първа	Tochka parva Item One	Boyan Danovski	77 min	Rumyana Chokoyska, Zheni Bozhinova and Konstantin Kisimov	Drama — received a Golden palm nomination at the 1956 Cannes Film Festival.	
1957
Години за любов	Godini za lyubov Years of Love	Yanko Yankov	77 min	Stefan Dobrev, Antoniya Yaneva, Nevena Kokanova, Ivan Andonov and Georgi Kaloyanchev	black and white comedy	
Животът си тече тихо...	Zhivotat si teche tiho... Life Flows Slowly by...	Hristo Ganev and Binka Zhelyazkova	120 min	Bogomil Simeonov, Georgi Georgiev-Getz, Emilia Radeva and Ivan Bratanov	black and white drama	
Земя	Zemya; A Land (Earth)	Zahari Zhandov	102 min	Bogomil Simeonov, Slavka Slavova and Ginka Stancheva	black and white drama based on the novel of Elin Pelin; Golden palm nomination at the 1957 Cannes Film Festival	
Лабакан	Labakan	Václav Krška	75 min	Eduard Cupák, Karel Fiala and Alexander Milkovski	Czechoslovakia/Bulgaria co-production based on the fairytale of Wilhelm Hauff	
Легенда за любовта	Legenda za lyubovta Legend of Love	Václav Krška	82 min	Apostol Karamitev, Emilia Radeva and Frantisek Smolík	Czechoslovakia/Bulgaria fantasy co-production based on Nazim Hikmet's play	
Тайната вечеря на седмаците	Taynata vecherya na sedmatzite Secret Supper of the Sedmak Family	Dako Dakovski	101 min	Ivan Bratanov, Nikolay Doychev and Maria Shopova	Black and White drama	
Урокът на историята	A Lesson in History	Lev Arnshtam and Hristo Piskov	91 min	Stefan Savov, Tzvetana Arnaudova, Apolon Yachnitzkiy and Gennadi Yudin	Soviet Union/Bulgaria co-production drama about Georgi Dimitrov and Leipzig Trial	
1958
Гераците	Geratzite; The Gerak Family	Anton Marinovich	96 min	Georgi Stamatov, Ivan Dimov and Maria Shopova	Black and White drama based on the novel by Elin Pelin	
Големанов	Golemanov	Kiril Ilinchev	84 min	Nikola Popov, Andrey Chaprazov and Penka Ikonomova	Black and White comedy based on the novel by Stefan Kostov	
Законът на морето	Zakonat na moreto The Law of the Sea	Yakim Yakimov	96 min	Georgi Georgiev-Getz, Bogomil Simeonov and Ani Damyanova	Black and White drama	
Любимец 13	Lyubimetz 13; Favourite No. 13	Vladimir Yanchev	89 min	Apostol Karamitev, Ginka Stancheva and Georgi Partsalev	Black and White comedy about twin brothers (an excellent footballer and an undependable gambler) that switch places. One of the most beloved Bulgarian films ever.	
На малкия остров	Na malkiya ostrov On a Small Island	Rangel Vulchanov	94 min	Ivan Kondov, Konstantin Kotsev and Ivan Andonov	Black and White drama	
Ребро Адамово	Rebro Adamovo; Adam's Rib	Anton Marinovich	n/a	Emilia Radeva, Georgi Popov and Georgi Kaloyanchev	Black and White drama	
Сиромашка радост	Siromashka radost Poor Man's Joy	Anton Marinovich	84 min	Ivan Dimov, Georgi Stamatov, Vyara Kovacheva, Kosta Tsonev, Ivan Bratanov and Vera Dragostinova	Black and White drama based on a number of Elin Pelin stories	
Хайдушка клетва	Haydushka kletva The Oath of the Haidouks	Petar Vasilev	98 min	Apostol Karamitev, Ginka Stancheva, Konstantin Kisimov and Ivan Bratanov	Black and White drama based on a novel by Orlin Vasilyev	
1959
В навечерието (Russian)	Nakanune; On the Eve	Vladimir Petrov	88 min	Lubomir Kabakchiyev, Irina Milopolskaya and Boris Livanov	Black and White Soviet Union/Bulgaria co-production based on the novel by Ivan Turgenev	
Командирът на отряда	Komandirat na otryada The Commander of the Detachment	Ducho Mundrov	108 min	Kosta Tsonev, Ivan Dimov, Tzvetana Nikolova and Ivan Bratanov	Black and White drama	
Stars (Sterne)	Звезди (Cyrillic); Stars	Konrad Wolf	Bulgaria:103 min/Germany:92 min	Sasha Krusharska, Jürgen Frohriep, Georgi Naumov, Leo Conforti, Grigor Vachkov and Itzhak Finzi	East Germany/Bulgaria co-production. Won Grand prize of the jury and got a Golden palm nomination at the Cannes Film Festival.	
Малката	Malkata; The Little Girl	Nikola Korabov	95 min	Rumyana Kefirova, Margarita Ilieva, Ivan Dimov and Georgi Kaloyanchev	Drama based on a novel by Lyuben Stanev	
