= List of monuments and memorials removed following the Russian invasion of Ukraine =

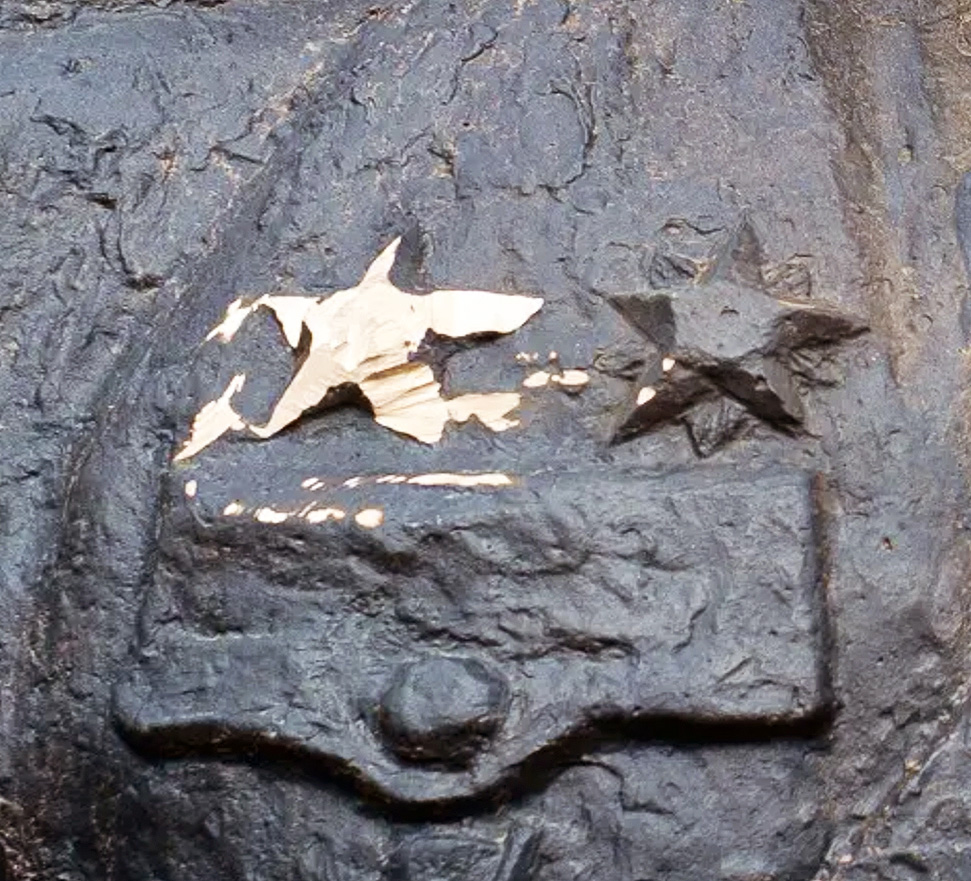
The controversial Bronze Soldier of Tallinn monument, vandalized in protest of the Russian invasion on Ukraine, 12 April 2022.

During the Russian invasion of Ukraine, that had commenced in February 2022, a number of Soviet-era monuments and memorials were demolished or removed, or commitments to remove them were announced in former Eastern Bloc Soviet satellite states, as well as several other countries formerly occupied by the Soviet Union.

== Background ==
In Ukraine, following the annexation of Crimea by the Russian Federation, between 2015 and 2020, around 2,000 monuments and symbols linked to Ukraine's communist past were removed. In 2017 Poland passed a de-communism law requiring such communist and totalitarian regime symbols to be removed.

== National response ==
Estonia

In November 2022, the Estonian Ministry of Foreign Affairs had counted 322 monuments and tombstones that may be subject to removal. It was decided that 244 of these would be dismantled, with 56 removed by December 2022.

Latvia

On July 14, 2022, Latvian Saeima approved the removal of 69 monuments, memorials, and other objects glorifying Soviet and Nazi regimes selected by the Heritage Administration, the Latvian Artists Union and Museum of the Occupation of Latvia. By 14 November, all 69 monuments had been removed, as well as an additional 55 Nazi and Soviet glorifying objects removed on the municipalities' own initiative.

Lithuania

Lithuania decided in April 2022 to complete the removal of all Russian monuments, begun in 1991, including those in cemeteries.

Poland

Poland began removing monuments following the 2016 law to de-communise Poland. The invasion of Ukraine generated an increased desire to remove such items, with 20 removed by August 2022 with 40 more scheduled for removal.

Ukraine

Ukraine had removed over 2,000 monuments to Russian communism by 2020 in accordance with the de-communism law of 2015, including 1,320 statues or busts of Lenin. Additional monuments were removed after the Russian invasion of Ukraine.

According to governor Maksym Kozytskyi, 312 monuments were removed in 2013 in Lviv Oblast. In January 2024 the Lviv Oblast became the first oblast to remove all Soviet Union-era monuments.

== Monuments removed ==
Monument/Memorial	Location	Country	Removal announced	Removed	Means of removal	Ref
Narva tank	Narva	Estonia	August 16, 2022	August 16, 2022	Government removal	
"Monument to the Liberators of Soviet Latvia and Riga from the German Fascist Invaders" (Red Army monument)	Riga	Latvia	May 12, 2022	August 25, 2022	Government removal	
Monument to the Fourth Unit of the Red Army's First Latvian Guerilla Brigade	Alsviķi Parish	Latvia	N/A	August 26, 2022	Vandalized	
Memorial Stone "To the Soviet Liberators of Madliena from the German Fascist Invaders"	Madliena	Latvia	N/A	April 26, 2022	Government removal	
Monument "To the Soviet Defenders of Liepāja"/Grenade Thrower	Liepāja	Latvia	N/A	October 25, 2022	Government removal	
Monument "To the Soviet Liberators of Daugavpils"	Daugavpils	Latvia	N/A	October 31, 2022	Government removal	
Monument "To the Liberators of Rēzekne"/Alyosha	Rēzekne	Latvia	N/A	November 9, 2022	Government removal	
World Peace monument	Helsinki	Finland	N/A	August 4, 2022	Government removal	
Medals from the Bronze Soldier of Tallinn	Tallinn	Estonia	N/A	12 April 2022	Vandalized	
Monument to the Red Army	Brzeg	Poland	24 August 2022	24 August 2022	Government removal	
Bust of Vladimir Lenin	Kotka	Finland	4 October 2022	4 October 2022	Government removal	
Bust of Vladimir Lenin	Turku	Finland	28 April 2022	28 April 2022	Government removal	
Monument of Gratitude to the Red Army	Glubczyce	Poland	27 October 2022	27 October 2022	Government removal	
Monument of Gratitude to the Red Army	Byczyna	Poland	27 October 2022	27 October 2022	Government removal	
Monument of Gratitude to the Red Army	Staszow	Poland	27 October 2022	27 October 2022	Government removal	
Monument of Gratitude to the Red Army	Bobolice	Poland	27 October 2022	27 October 2022	Government removal	
Monument of friendship between Russia and Ukraine	Kyiv	Ukraine	28 April 2022	28 April 2022	Government removal	
Monument to the Liberator Soldier	Kharkiv	Ukraine	N/A	23 May 2023	Vandalized	
Statues of Soviet World War Two soldiers	Antakalnis Cemetery, Vilnius	Lithuania	22 November 2022	6 December 2022	Government removal	
Soviet state emblem emblazoned on the Motherland Monument statue	Kyiv	Ukraine	1 August 2023	1 August 2023	Government removal	
Monument to the Soviet Army, Sofia	Sofia	Bulgaria	1993	December 2023	Government removal	
Mykola Shchors monument	Kyiv	Ukraine		December 2023	Government removal	
Nikolai Vatutin monument	Kyiv	Ukraine	8 February 2023	9 February 2023	Government removal	
Catherine the Great statue	Odesa	Ukraine	November 2022	29 December 2022	Government removal	
312 unnamed statues	Lviv Oblast	Ukraine		2023	activists and local residents	
Monument to the War Glory of the Soviet Army	Lviv	Ukraine		23 July 2021	Government removal	
Alexander Pushkin monument	Riga	Latvia	3 March 2023	30 May 2023	Government removal	
Michael Andreas Barclay de Tolly monument	Riga	Latvia	16 October 2024	30 October 2024	Government removal	

== See also ==
- Anti-Sovietism
- Decommunization
- Demolition of monuments to Vladimir Lenin in Ukraine
- Demolition of monuments to Alexander Pushkin in Ukraine
