= Gennady Myasnikov =

Soviet production designer

Gennady Alekseyevich Myasnikov (Russian: Геннадий Алексеевич Мясников; 12 September 1919 – 16 January 1989) was a Soviet production designer and artist. He was nominated for an Academy Award for Best Art Direction for his work on the epic film War and Peace (1967). He was born in Sosnovka (now Perm Krai), and died in Moscow.

== Filmography ==
- The Stone Flower (1946); together with Mikhail Bogdanov
- Michurin (1948); together with Bogdanov
- Three Encounters (1948)
- Brave People (1950); together with Bogdanov
- Przhevalsky (1951); together with Bogdanov
- Hostile Whirlwinds (1953); together with Bogdanov
- Heroes of Shipka (1954)
- The First Echelon (1955)
- The Communist (1957); together with Bogdanov
- Pardesi (1957); together with Bogdanov
- Russian Souvenir (1960); together with Bogdanov
- The Cossacks (1961); together with Bogdanov
- Hussar Ballad (1962); together with Bogdanov
- War and Peace (1967); together with Bogdanov
- Matters of the Heart (1973)
- The Last Victim (1975)
- A Strange Woman (1977)
