= Accidental Meeting =

Accidental Meeting may refer to:

- Accidental Meeting (1994 film), an American made-for-television thriller film
- Accidental Meeting (1936 film), a Soviet action comedy film
