= Admiral Nakhimov =

Admiral Nakhimov may refer to:

- Russian Admiral Pavel Nakhimov
- Admiral Nakhimov (film), a 1947 Soviet film directed by Vsevolod Pudovkin
- Ships named after the admiral:
  - SS Admiral Nakhimov
  - Admiral Nakhimov, a Russian armoured cruiser
  - Former name of the Soviet cruiser Chervona Ukraina
  - Admiral Nakhimov, a Sverdlov-class cruiser
  - Admiral Nakhimov, a Kresta II-class cruiser
  - Russian battlecruiser Admiral Nakhimov, formerly Kalinin, a Kirov-class battlecruiser
