= Ukraine on Fire =

Ukraine on Fire may refer to:

- Ukraine on Fire (novel), a 1966 novel by Oleksandr Dovzhenko
- Ukraine on Fire (film), a 2016 film by Oliver Stone

== See also ==
- Ukraine in Flames, a 1943 film by Oleksandr Dovzhenko and Yuliya Solntseva
- Winter on Fire: Ukraine's Fight for Freedom, a 2015 film by Evgeny Afineevsky
