= Ukraine on Fire (novel) =

1966 novel by Oleksandr Dovzhenko

- Author: Oleksandr Dovzhenko
- Language: Ukrainian
- Genre: cinema novel
- Published: 1966

Ukraine on Fire (Ukrainian: «Україна в огні», romanized: Ukraina v ohni) is a cinema novel by Oleksandr Dovzhenko about the events of the Second World War in Ukraine, the fate of an rural family and ordinary peasants.

== History of writing and publication ==
Oleksandr Dovzhenko began writing the novel Ukraine on Fire at the beginning of the Second World War. The author was strongly impressed by the terrible destruction and the many victims, so he quickly organized his experiences and observations into a journalistic essayUkraine on Fire and the stories On Barbed Wire (1942), Victory (1942), and Unforgettable (1942). The author read his works in the frontline near the village of Pomerky to a member of the Military Council, Lieutenant General Nikita Khrushchev, who liked the work very much.

In August 1943, in the village of Mali Prokhody, Kharkiv Oblast, Nikita Khrushchev gathered a group of intellectuals to speak to the soldiers. At the time, everyone was looking forward to listening to a true story about the war written by Oleksandr Dovzhenko. However, it suddenly turned out that the manuscript of Ukraine on Fire had disappeared. As it became known later, the film story ended up on the desk of Lavrentiy Beria, who passed the text on to Stalin for consideration.

Fragments of the script appeared in print in September 1943. The Soviet authorities immediately reacted to this text by expressing indignation. On November 26, 1943, Oleksandr Dovzhenko wrote in his diary: "...Stalin did not like my story “Ukraine on Fire”, and he banned it from publication and from staging."

On the night of January 30–31, 1944, a special meeting of the Politburo of the CPSU was convened with the participation of Molotov, Beria, Mikoyan, Khrushchev, and others, where the “Kremlin crucifixion” of Oleksandr Dovzhenko took place. The author himself recalls this day as follows:

Today is the anniversary of my death. On January 31, 1944, I was brought to the Kremlin. There I was chopped to pieces and the bloody parts of my soul were scattered for shame and disgrace at all gatherings… I held on for a year and fell. My heart could not bear the burden of untruth and evil. I was born and lived for good and love. I was killed by the hatred of the great at the moment of their smallness

— from the diary of Oleksandr Dovzhenko

The publication was personally prohibited by Stalin, as he angrily criticizes the writer and his work. He calls Ukraine on Fire "an attempt to revise Leninism," "a speech against the party, against the Soviet government, against the kolkhoz villagers". Stalin's main accusations were the nationalistic orientation of the work and the neglect of the ideas of internationalism.

Oleksandr Dovzhenko was fired from his job, which meant that he was completely removed from cinematic activity. In 1949, the author's last lifetime film, Michurin, was released.

The first edition of the film story Ukraine on Fire appeared in 1966 with significant changes, and the full publication of the work was published in 1983.

== Main characters ==
Lavrin Zaporozhets was the father of five sons; at the request of the Nazis, he was elected village elder; he killed Zabroda and Ludwig von Kraus; he was accused of betraying the Soviet government.

Tetiana was the Lavrin's wife; killed by Erich von Kraus.

Theis kids:

- Roman was a border guard;
- Ivan was an artilleryman;
- Savka was a Black Sea sailor;
- Hryhorii was an agronomist;
- Trohym was a plowman;
- Olesia was Vasyl Kravchyna's beloved, the ideal Ukrainian girl.

Grandfather Demyd was a beekeeper who was hanged because his bees had stung German soldiers.

Kuprian Khutornyi was the father of Khrystia and Petro.

Khrystia Khutirna was Olesia's friend; she is the most tragic female character in the novel; she marries Antonio Palmo to survive.

Petro Khutirnyi was a deserter; he became a policeman; he mortally injured his father.

Ernst von Kraus was an old colonel of German intelligence; the “ruler” of the Ukrainian lands.

Antonio Palma was a captain of the Italian penal detachment; he was the husband of Khrystia Khutirna.

Vasyl Kravchyna was a Red Army tanker; he was Olesia's lover.

Ludwig von Kraus was a lieutenant; son of Ernst von Kraus; viceroy on the territory of Ukraine.

Levchykha was a fellow villager of Lavrin Zaporozhets; she came to feed him in the concentration camp.

== Plot ==
The film introduces us to a family of soldiers, the Zaporozhets, who are seeing their sons off to the front. Before the boys can leave, a bombing raid begins, killing Savko and wounding his mother. The other sons are able to escape.

Daughter Olesia invites Vasyl to spend the night at her place. She is afraid that enemies will come and abuse her, so she decides to give him her honor. Vasyl, hesitantly, agrees.

The Germans capture the village, and now Colonel Ernst von Kraus and his son Ludwig Kraus are in power in the local community. The young Kraus's strategy is to pit Ukrainians against each other, so he elects the police, the headman, and the police chief from among his fellow villagers.

Lavrin Zaporozhets becomes a headman. He makes a list of young people who are to be taken to work in Germany. Olesia is not on the list, so the villagers begin to show their dissatisfaction. Finally, the girl leaves Ukraine.

Lavrin planned to escape the youth with the help of partisans, but it did not work. The man was punished and arrested for his betrayal. Lavrin Zaporozhets and his fellow villagers manage to escape. They kill young Kraus, for which the old colonel burned the village.

Olesia gets to Germany, where Ukrainian girls are trafficked. This is how the girl ends up with Kraus's wife. After a terrible suffering, Olesia Zaporozhets manages to return to her homeland, Ukraine. Here she waited for her beloved Vasyl.

Roman Zaporozhets with his father was driving into his native burned village. A wagon was following them, the wounded shouted "hurray" and cried with joy. The soldiers praised Kravchyna's artillerymen, who were wounded but happy to have fulfilled their great mission. Olesia stood by a well with buckets. The army was marching west. The soldiers drank the water and cheerfully thanked her. She wanted to run to find Vasyl, but something told her that he would come to her. And he did. "It was him and not him... Something was different about him, something immeasurable, indescribable." Vasyl was also struck by her change and said: "How beautiful you are!" as he stroked her graying head. Lavrin, Roman, and Ivan Zaporozhets came to the burned house. Only their mother, grandfather Demyd, Savka, and Hryhorii were not among them... They stood together around the stove and sang their mother's favorite song: Oh, I'm going to go to my family for a walk, I have a rich family... In the morning, Olesia again sent off her entire family to war

— Oleksandr Dovzhenko, Ukraine on Fire

Oleksandr Dovzhenko pointed out that in his work there are "traces of the battle between the screenwriter and the writer". The writer's persona wanted to express itself as vividly as possible. For this reason, the work contains insert stories, episodes, memories, analytical reflections, and lyrical digressions. Nevertheless, Dovzhenko, a screenwriter, created life collisions of characters that quickly replaced each other.

== Features and topics ==
Ukraine was the first target of German attacks in the USSR. The battles that took place on its fields were the most terrible and largest, causing the entire country to suffer and burn in fire. The author portrays these events with regret, pain, and a strong sense of animosity towards the enemies.

The rye is burning for many kilometers, burning, trampled by people and wagons... Airplanes are roaring. Bombs are flying. Horsemen scatter like birds across the field... Screaming, crying, and the high-pitched cry of wounded horses.

=== The problem of betrayal ===
Complete confusion among the population, confusion in the army before the sudden iron invasion. The sons of Kupriyan Khutornyi, one of the protagonists of the film, became deserters, returned home, and justified themselves to their father:

Dad, we lost a general. He shot himself, even if the ground didn't accept him... We're lost. The bridges, Dad, are destroyed. We can't swim.

The writer is looking for the reasons for the treason and speaks about them in direct authorial addresses to the reader. These words sound like an angry indictment of the state policy for the education of young people:

In the terrible great hour of their people's life, they had neither the intelligence nor the greatness of soul. Under the pressure of the most difficult situations, they did not go east with their great company, which was later destined to surprise the world with its exploits. Accustomed to typical carelessness, deprived of knowledge of the solemn prohibition and the sanctity of the call, their sluggish natures did not rise to the heights of understanding the course of history, which called them to a gigantic battle, to the extraordinary. And none of the glorious great-grandfathers of history, the great warriors, were of any help to them, because they were not taught history. The close relatives of the revolutionary heroes did not help either, because their memory was not honored in the village. Among the first blows of fate, they lost their oath, because the word "sacred" did not ring a solemn bell in their hearts. They were spiritually unarmed, naive, and short-sighted.

Even the enemies know about this Achilles' heel of the Ukrainian people. German officer Ernst von Kraus tells his son:

These people are completely devoid of the ability to forgive each other for their disagreements, even in the name of common, high interests. They have no state instinct… You know, they don't study history. It's amazing. For twenty-five years they have been living with negative slogans of rejecting God, property, family, and friendship! They have only an adjective left of the word "nation." They have no eternal truths. That is why there are so many traitors among them…

=== The problem of refugees and the split of the nation from within ===
The war brought the whole of Ukraine to its feet. Thousands of refugees, mostly urban residents, were travelling to the east. And the villagers, tied to the land by 'thousand-year ties', could not all leave, so they looked after those who were leaving and spoke:

I wonder where they are going, I hope they don't get hurt! I wish they would run and not stop! But why are they being transported in cars? Maybe they could use the cars for something else!

Those who were going to the rear asked each other:

Listen, why aren't they running away? Do you see? They're not running away? — Well, I see. Why should they run away? They're waiting for the Germans.

This is how the nation was split from within, and this is another of the tragic consequences of the war that will be felt by the people for many years after the war ended. And as the front approached, the gap between those who were going to the rear and those who were leaving or staying deepened:

Trucks of various munitions, military trades, departments, and supplies flew by. The cold, angry drivers seemed to see nothing on the road. Neither did the passengers. Many of them were worthless people who lacked a deep understanding of the national tragedy. Underdevelopment of ordinary human relations, boring formalism, departmental indifference, or simply lack of human imagination and stupid selfishness drove them on state rubber wheels past the wounded.

=== The problem of women in war ===
The worst thing was that "middle-ranking statesmen" were fleeing themselves and accusing others of panic and hiding the truth. Vasyl Kravchyna, hearing the head of the executive committee of one town, N. Lymanchuk, talking to two girls about retreating, bitterly exclaimed to them:

Run away, my sisters, run away. For the Germans will come, mutilate you, infect you with diseases, and drive you into captivity, and this incombustible closet," — Vasyl pointed to his head, which is going to run away, will return later and judge you for debauchery.

This is exactly what happened to the heroine of the work, Khrystia, and hundreds of other girls. They had to go through all the circles of Nazi hell and then stand trial before cold and soulless 'fireproof cabinets' that decided that they were the leaders of state policy, the party line.

=== War atmosphere ===
It was a long, very long war. And a lot of blood was shed, as the writer notes, "more than could have been shed. And suffering".

The author shows the depth of the people's grief during the occupation: they had to plow instead of horses and oxen, and send the nation's best men and women to Germany for hard labor, suffer humiliation, die in fires, at the point of German guns, and on gallows. This is just one of the horrific episodes depicted in the movie. Ernst von Kraus, who was being pursued by partisans, did not sleep well. And the payback for this was direful:

Hundreds of poor people, shot, maimed, with stars carved on their chests and foreheads, burned that night in the village, locked in burning barns and churches. Ukrainian children paid the price for the German painful dream with severe torment in the fire.

The inexorable war has swept across the Ukrainian land more than once, increasing the number of victims and devastation. The author presents an evil landscape that makes feel creepy:

The horizons were covered in smoke. Rolls of fire rolled from east to west and from west to east with thunder and roar more than once. Dead tanks blackened the fields with their formidable carcasses, like extinct monsters in the desert. And wherever you went, wherever you walked, you could smell the spirit of an unburied human corpse. The mined, unmown fields were full of ominous secrets.

Immeasurable was the tragedy of ordinary soldiers who bore the brunt of the battle for their homeland. Neither animals, nor birds, nor reptiles could withstand these battles:

Such was the terrible world in battle. Only human being could stand the battle…

Dovzhenko's description of the fighting takes several pages, it is the pain of a wounded heart, a cry of the soul:

People, come to your senses!

He incorporates his personal observations and experiences into his writing, presenting them to his readers with great talent:

Air waves and violent whirlwinds from flying large shells and mine explosions pulled people off the ground, twisted them up like an autumn leaf, and threw them to the ground.

The whole air came into frantic motion, the whole atmosphere sounded, roared, exploded, quacked and thundered with thousands of thunderbolts, the air was on fire. The soldiers' shirts were on fire.

... Seven times the fighters met the enemy. Seven of the heaviest German attacks were beaten to smithereens, into dust and smoke. Thirty-six enemy tanks were already burning in front of them and carried their formidable glory to the sky. The corpses of the enemy lay in great numbers between the tanks.

There were many such fatal battles, and they often ended in one:

We gave everything away. Everything to the last thread. We fought with life, with the war, with the enemies to the fullest. We did not get wise, did not hide in the reserves and rear, did not acquire relatives at our simple artillery posts. We did not squeeze much use out of our small talents, …we did not like to show off either in their whole form or in their wounded state or in any kind of valor…

=== Heroes and victims of war ===
The author mentions the names of the heroes who defended the land against the Nazi horde. The list includes not only Ukrainians but also Russians, Georgians, and representatives of various nationalities who fought together against the Germans. The accusation of nationalism against Dovzhenko seems groundless, as the author acknowledges the contribution of all nationalities in the fight against the Germans.

The writer admires the courage of his heroes, glorifies their feat for centuries, although his heart was bleeding for the lost strength and lives.

How the people fought! It was as if centuries of indomitable stubbornness and fighting generosity suddenly unleashed in the Vernyhoras, Trukhanovs, Vovkas, and Yakimaks. Their native homeland multiplied their anger and the strength of their fighting spirit. They seemed to have grown into the ground, and when the Germans were very close, they stood up as one and attacked right against the middle of the formidable German rampart.

=== Ending ===
The story ends as it begins, with a happy reunion of the Zaporozhets family. The mother's favourite song is heard again, although without her (the mother died along with her village). Now Olesia, as the keeper of the family, has to accompany her family off to war:

Early in the morning, Olesia would again send her entire family to the war, so that evil people would never think that he was not generous with the blood and fire sent to him by the shameful history of Europe.

== Nowadays ==
Ukraine on Fire is included in the modern educational program for grades 10–11 in Ukraine.

Against the backdrop of Russian invasion of Ukraine, was created the documentary series Ukraine on Fire 2. The title is a reference to Dovzhenko's story.

== See also ==
- Arsenal (1929 film)
- Shchors (film)
