= Mykola Shchors =

Ukrainian communist military commander (1895–1919)

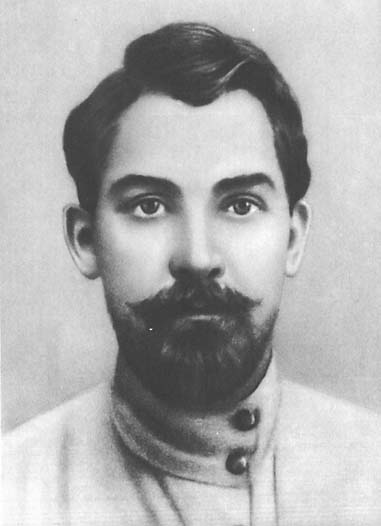
- Born: 6 June 1895; Snovsk, Chernigov Governorate, Russian Empire
- Died: 30 August 1919 (aged 24) near Biloshytsya, Volyn Governorate, Ukrainian People’s Republic
- Military career
- Allegiance: Russian Empire (1914–1917); Soviet Ukraine (1918–1919)
- Branch: Russian Imperial Army; Red Army
- Service years: 1914–1919
- Rank: Comdiv
- Unit: Bohun Regiment
- Commands: Bohun Regiment; 2nd Brigade (1st Ukrainian Soviet Division); 44th Rifle Division
- Conflicts: World War I Ukrainian–Soviet War †
- Awards: Honorary weapon

Signature
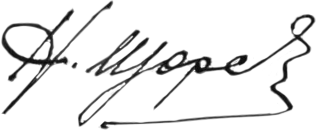

Mykola Oleksandrovych Shchors (Ukrainian: Мико́ла Олекса́ндрович Щорс; Russian: Никола́й Алекса́ндрович Щорс; 6 June [O.S. 25 May] 1895 – 30 August 1919) was a member of the Russian Communist Party and a participant in the Russian Civil War, serving as Red Army commander. In 1918–1919 he fought against the newly established Ukrainian People's Republic. Later he commanded the Bohunsky regiment, brigade, 1st Soviet Ukrainian division and 44th Rifle Division against the Ukrainian People's Republic and their Polish allies. Shchors was killed following the evacuation of Kyiv in 1919. After being ignored for more than a decade, Shchors became celebrated as a hero in the Soviet Union following the mid-1930s.

== Early life ==
Mykola Shchors was born in the village of Snovsk of Gorodnya uyezd (Chernigov Governorate) into a Ukrainian kulak family. His father, Oleksandr Mykolayovich, was a locomotive engineer, according to the official Soviet historiography. He came from a town of Stowbtsy (Minsk Governorate) "in search of better life" to Snovsk where he was able to build a house.

Mykola Shchors was the family's oldest child. His siblings were Konstantin (1896–1979), Akulina (1898–1937), Yekaterina (1900–1984), and Olga (1900–1985).

In 1905 Mykola enrolled in a parish church school. In 1906 Mykola's mother died giving a birth to another child. About six months after the death of his wife, Mykola's father remarried, this time to Maria Konstantinovna Podbelo. Aleksandr and Maria had five more children: Grigori, Zinaida, Boris, Raisa, and Lidia. In 1909 Mykola Shchors graduated from his church school.

== World War I ==
In 1910 Shchors enrolled in a military medical college (uchilishche) in Kyiv, which had been established in 1833. The school was typically attended by the children of retired soldiers. Among its graduates were Ivan Ohienko, Ostap Vyshnya, and Mykhailo Donets. The state scholarship provided free enrollment which had to be repaid by army service.

Shchors graduated from the school in 1914 and, upon receiving the rank of a junior physician assistant, was transferred to the Vilna Military District. In September 1914, when the Russian Empire entered World War I, Shchors went to the front lines as part of the 3rd Light Artillery Division near Vilnius, where he served as a medical assistant and was wounded in battle.

Upon recovery in 1916, Shchors enrolled in the accelerated four-month program at Vilnius Military School, which had been evacuated to Poltava in 1915. The school was preparing Under officers and praporshchiks and specialized in tactics, navigation, and trench warfare. Upon graduation in May 1916 Shchors was sent as a praporshchik to a reserve regiment in Simbirsk. In September he transferred to the 335th Anapa Regiment of the 84th Infantry Division (South-Western Front). For his courage and tactical knowledge, Shchors was promoted to a rank of junior lieutenant (podporuchik). However, the trench warfare affected his health and he was diagnosed with tuberculosis and once again sent to the rear.

== Revolutionary period ==
Upon his release on 30 December 1917 from the Simferopol City hospital Shchors was released from military service due to his poor health. At the beginning of 1918 he returned to Snovsk. In January 1918 the government of Soviet Russia attacked the Ukrainian People's Republic, accusing the latter of sabotaging the frontlines of the Russian Imperial Army and impeding the military maneuvers of the Red Army. In less than three weeks, the Red Guards occupied most of Left-bank Ukraine. Just before elections to the Ukrainian Constituent Assembly, the Red Army under Mikhail Muravyov captured Kyiv. The government of Ukraine appealed to foreign powers for military aid, finding it in the Central Powers that were keen to destroy the Russian Revolution.

Sometime after his return to Ukraine, he became acquainted with the chairman of a local Cheka Fruma Rostova (real name Khaikina), whom he married in the fall of 1918. Rostova was in her early 20s and was conducting so-called "cleaning" (zachistka) in the region, an ambiguous Cheka term. Khaikina has been accused of ordering the execution of hundreds of civilians, including women and young children. Around that time, Shchors enrolled in the Russian Communist Party (bolshevik).

In March–April 1918 he commanded a joint detachment of Novozybkovsky district that fought against the Ukrainian and German armies as a part of the 1st Insurgent Division. In September 1918 he formed the 1st Bohun Regiment and led it against occupying German forces and the externally supported Ukrainian State army but not after initially being defeated by Ukrainian greycoats. In November 1918 he took command of the 2nd brigade of the 1st Ukrainian Soviet division (Bohun and Tarashcha regiments) and conquered Chernihiv, Kyiv and Fastiv from the Ukrainian Directory. From 5 to 13 February 1919 Shchors was mayor of Kyiv.

Between 6 March and 15 August 1919 Shchors again led the 1st Ukrainian Soviet division in its offensive and took control of Zhytomyr, Vinnytsia, and Zhmerynka from the Ukrainian People's Republic. Then he decisively defended the main forces of the Ukrainian People's Republic near Sarny – Rivne – Brody – Proskuriv.

In summer 1919 the Polish army began a major offensive. Shchors attempted to hold the line near Sarny – Novohrad-Volynsky – Shepetivka, but was forced to retreat east by the more numerous, better trained, and better equipped Poles. The 1st Ukrainian Soviet division merged with the 44th Rifle Division and Shchors was appointed its commander. Under his command the division defended the Korostensky railroad junction, allowing the evacuation of Kyiv and the escape of the southern group of the 12th Army from encirclement.

== Death ==
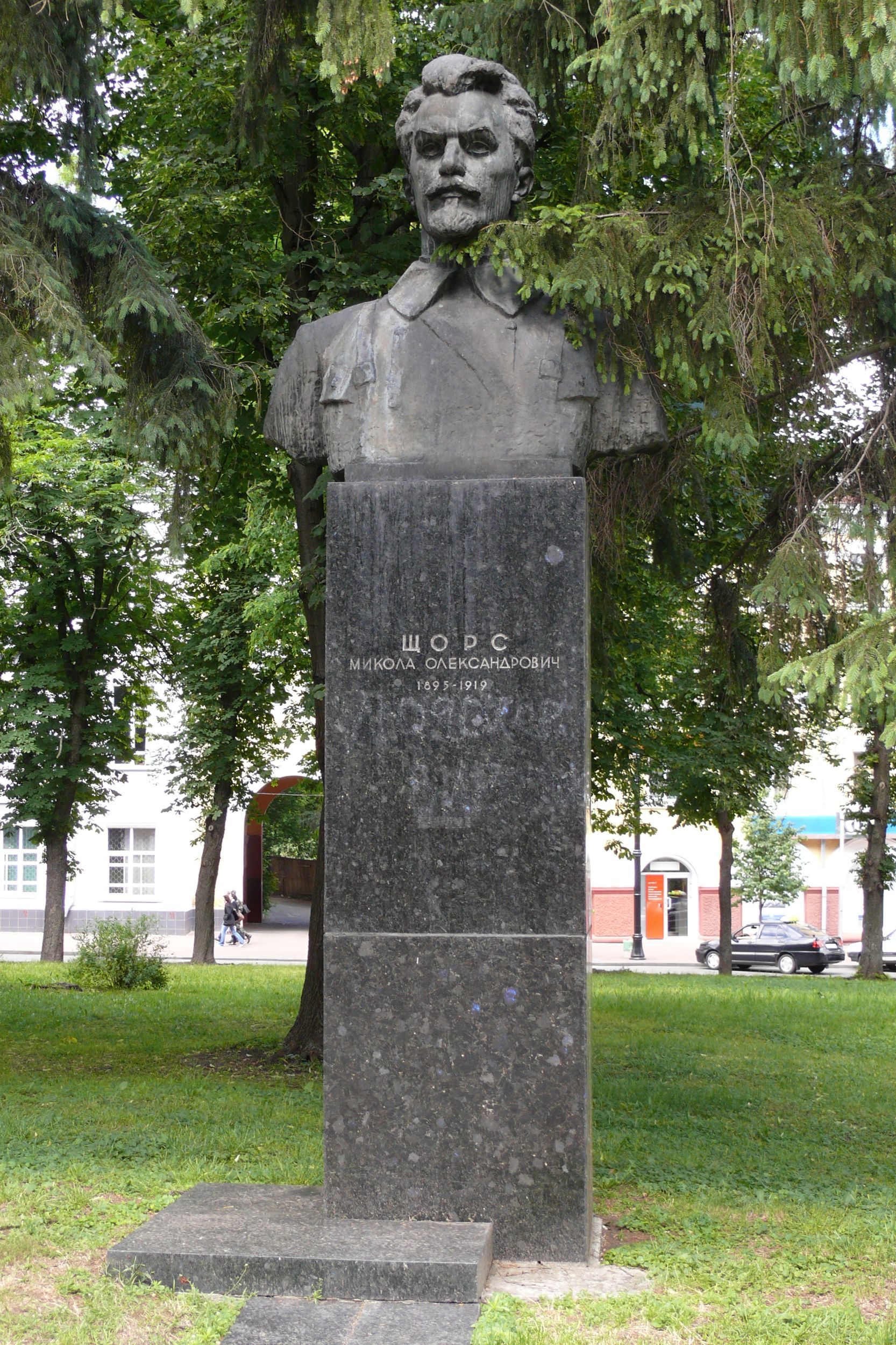
Monument to Mykola Shchors in Chernihiv in 2012, this monument was dismantled in April 2015, just after Ukrainian decommunization laws were passed

According to an official report, while fighting in the front lines of Bohun regiment, Shchors was killed in obscure circumstances fighting the Ukrainian Galician Army near the Biloshytsi village (near Korosten) in Zhytomyr Oblast on 30 August 1919. Shchors died after receiving a bullet in the back of his head. While imprisoned in 1937 Ivan Dubovoy admitted that he had killed his superior commander Shchors. Shchors body was buried in Samara, even though Shchors had no links with this city. In 1926 the cemetery where Shchors was buried was closed and his widow did not request a reburial, so his grave was removed.

== Personal life ==
Shchors' widow's maiden name was Fruma Khaikina. Her revolutionary name was Rostova, after the heroine of War and Peace, Natasha Rostova. Their daughter married noted Soviet physicist Isaak Khalatnikov.

== Legacy ==
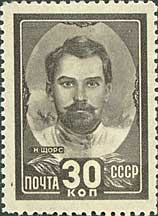
Shchors on a 1944 Soviet stamp

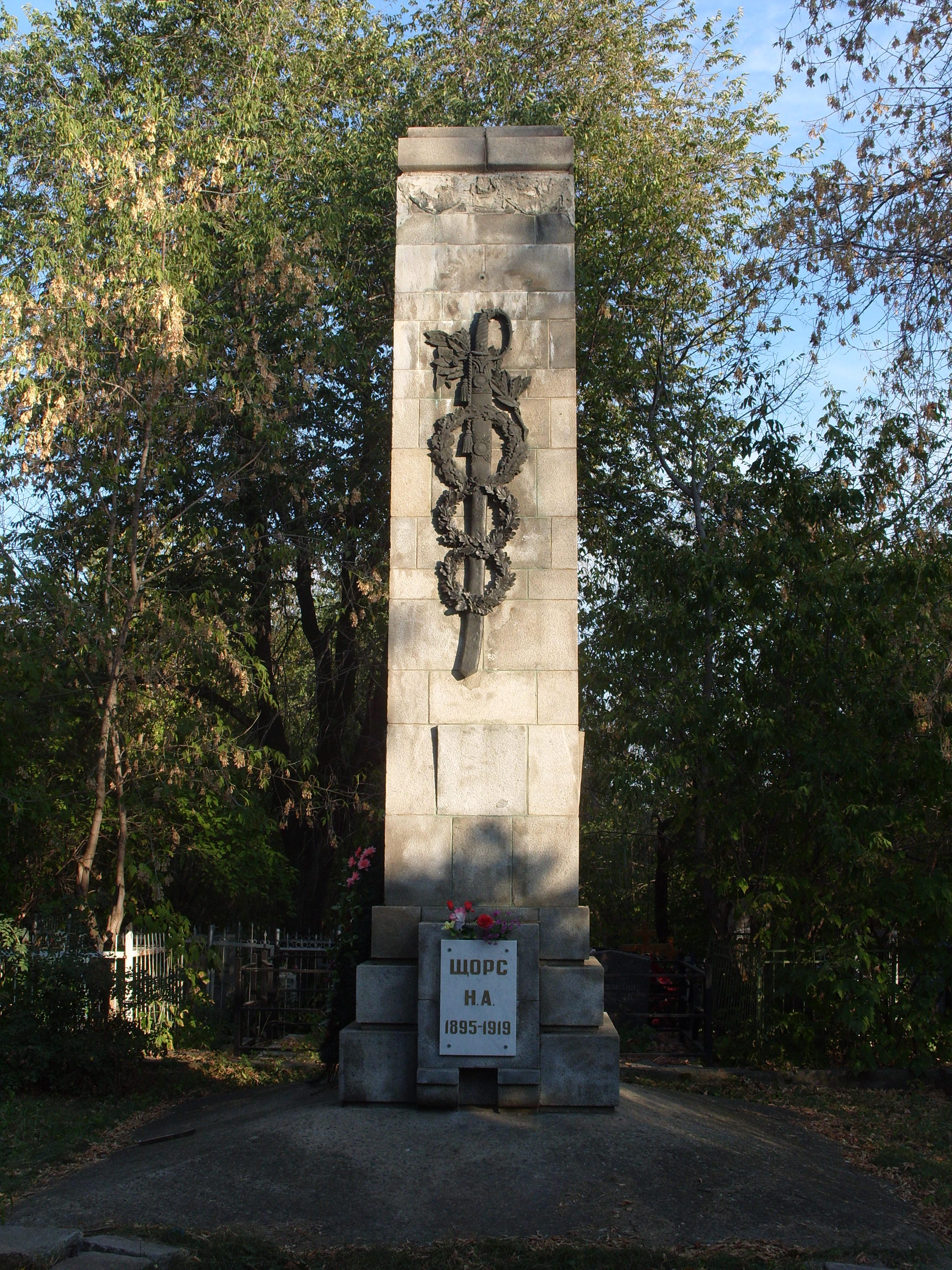
Grave memorial monument in Samara

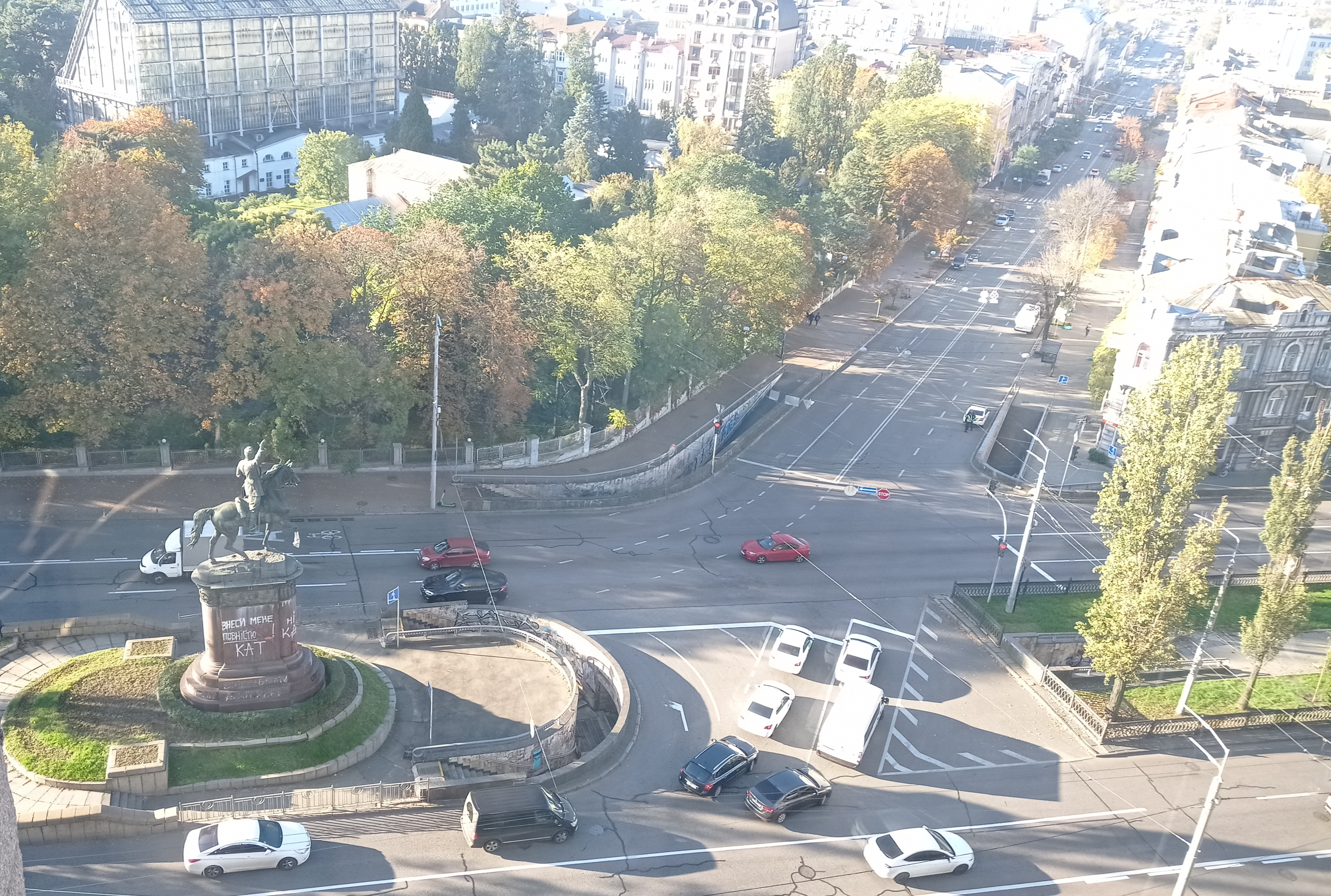
Shchors monument in Kyiv in 2022, including graffiti, translating to slogans such as "demolish me completely!" and "butcher". Demolished 9 December 2023.

Snovsk, a city in Ukraine was called Shchors between 1935 and 2016. Following 1935 in the Soviet Union many streets, avenues, parks, collective farms and villages were renamed to include Shchors name in their name. In the 1930s, 1940s and 1950s the Soviet authorities issued numerous orders to erect monuments to Shchors in many cities.

Shchors is the hero of an eponymous 1938 opera by Borys Lyatoshynsky. In 1939 Aleksandr Dovzhenko made a film titled Shchors, which was awarded the State Prize of the Soviet Union in 1941. Petro Kralyuk of the National University of Ostroh Academy claimed in 2020 that this film was ordered to be made by Joseph Stalin to make Shchors a mythical hero. When personally awarding Dovzhenko the Order of Lenin in February 1935 Stalin told him "give us a Ukrainian Chapayev." Yevgeny Samoylov played Shchors in the movie. A famous Soviet song, "Song about Shchors", was composed by Matvey Blanter, the author of "Katyusha".

His childhood home in Snovsk was converted into a memorial museum in August 1939.

In 1947 and 1948 Shchors' destroyed grave (in 1926) was searched for. In 1949 the grave of Shchors was refound (by Ivan Feraponov who had buried him and remembered where his grave was). The ashes were reburied in the Kuibyshev City Cemetery of Samara, and later a granite obelisk was erected on the grave.

In Kyiv a 7-ton monument to Shchors that was erected in 1954, the year of the 300th anniversary of the Pereiaslav Agreement, was dismantled on 9 December 2023.
