= Invisible Jan =

- Russian: Неуловимый Ян
- Directed by: Isidor Annensky; Vladimir Petrov
- Written by: Aleksandr Stolper; Olga Ziv
- Starring: Evgeniy Samoylov; Evgeniya Gorkusha; Yuri Aleqsi-Meskhishvili; Giorgi Davitashvili; K. Dobjinski
- Cinematography: Anatoli Golovnya; Tamara Lobova
- Music by: Andrei Balanchivadze
- Release date: 1943
- Country: Soviet Union

A still from the film

Invisible Jan, (Russian: Неуловимый Ян) is a 1943 Soviet World War II film directed by Isidor Annensky and Vladimir Petrov.

The film tells about the confrontation between Czechoslovak patriots and German fascists.

== Plot ==
Armed with forged documents, former Prague University student Jan Smudek, a survivor of a concentration camp, travels across the roads of Czechia in a comfortable car. Using every secluded spot he can find, Jan broadcasts radio messages urging the people to actively resist fascism. Every day, precisely at noon, his broadcasts deliver the truth about the Soviet Union.

Nazi agents relentlessly hunt for the elusive patriot, but whenever it seems like capture and death are inevitable, ordinary citizens come to his aid, ensuring his mission continues.

== Starring ==
- Evgeniy Samoylov as Jani (as E. Samoylov)
- Evgeniya Gorkusha as Milcha (as Evgenia Gorkusha-Shirshova)
- Yuri Aleqsi-Meskhishvili as Jaroslavi
- Giorgi Davitashvili as Professor
- K. Dobjinski as Drabeki
