= Mikhail Bogdanov (artist) =

Russian production designer (1914–1995)

Mikhail Aleksandrovich Bogdanov (Russian: Михаи́л Алекса́ндрович Богда́нов; 17 November 1914, Vyborg – 20 September 1995, Moscow) was a Soviet and Russian production designer. He was nominated, along with Gennady Myasnikov, for an Academy Award for Best Art Direction for his work in the epic film War and Peace (1967).

== Filmography ==
- The Stone Flower (1946)
- Michurin (1949)
- Heroes of Shipka (1955)
- The Communist (1957)
- Pardesi (1957)
- Hussar Ballad (1962)
- War and Peace (1967)
