= Yevgeny Samoylov =

Soviet and Russian actor (1912–2006)

- Евгений Самойлов
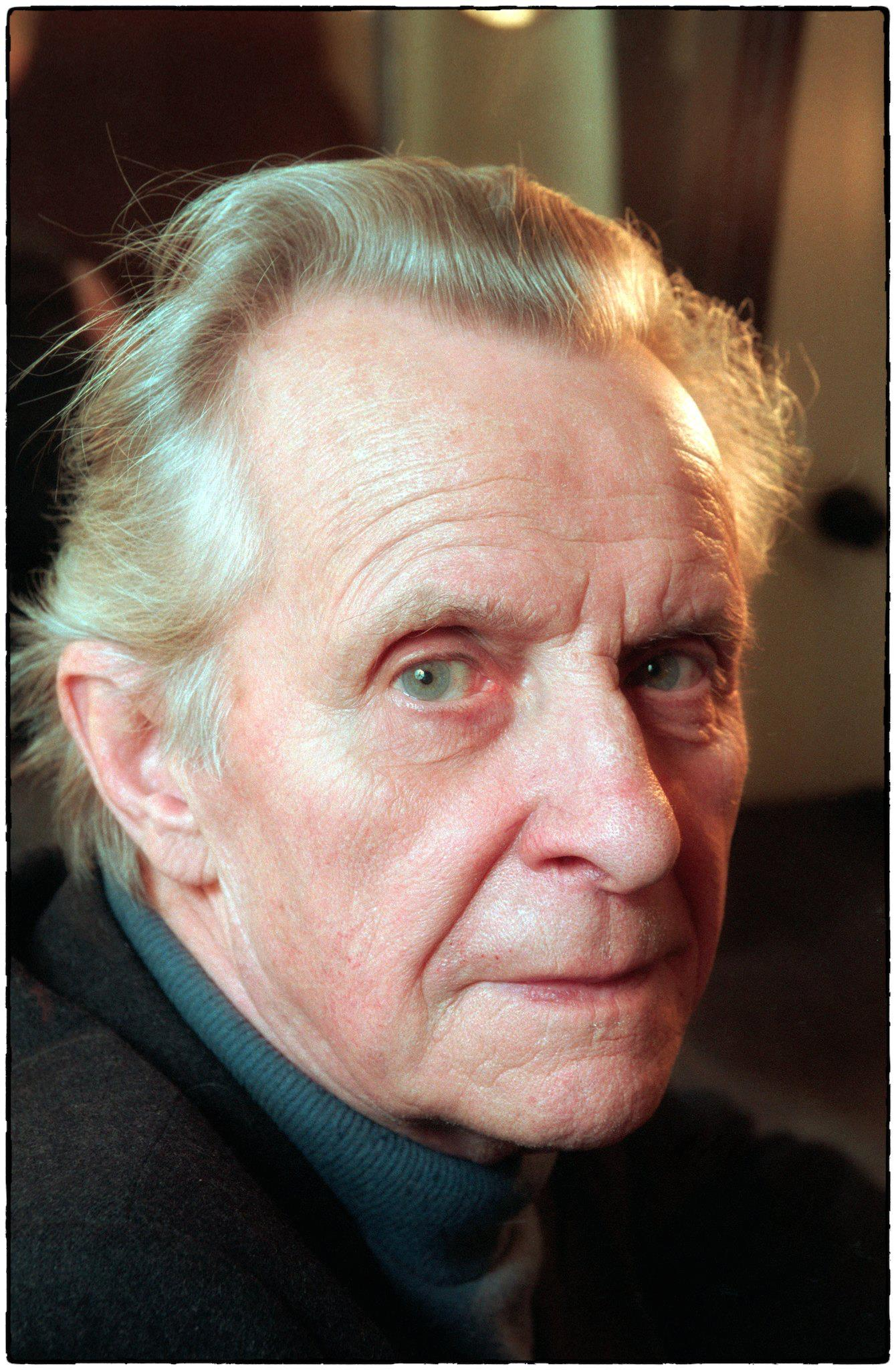
- Samoylov in 1997
- Born: Yevgeny Valerianovich Samoylov; 16 April 1912; Saint Petersburg, Russian Empire
- Died: 17 February 2006 (aged 93); Moscow, Russia
- Resting place: Vagankovo Cemetery; Moscow, Russia
- Occupation: Actor
- Years active: 1932–2003
- Children: Tatiana Samoilova; Aleksandr Samoilov

Yevgeny Valerianovich Samoylov (Russian: Евгений Валерианович Самойлов; 16 April 1912 – 17 February 2006) was a Soviet actor who gained prominence in youthful heroic parts and was named a People's Artist of the USSR in 1974. He was the father of Tatiana Samoilova, best known for her lead role in The Cranes Are Flying (1957).

== Biography ==
Born 16 April 1912, in Saint Petersburg, he was educated in Leningrad, starting his career at a local theatre. In 1934, he was noticed by Vsevolod Meyerhold who invited him to join his own troupe in Moscow. Samoylov worked with Meyerhold for four years. He got his most substantial roles in Meyerhold's theatre playing Hernani in Hugo's drama and Chatsky in Woe from Wit.

When Meyerhold was arrested and purged in 1938, Samoylov was in the middle of rehearsing for Pushkin's Boris Godunov (the role of Grigory Otrepyev) and Ostrovsky's How the Steel Was Tempered (the role of Pavka Korchagin). His acting career seemed to be unhampered, however. Samoylov's appearance as the Soviet commander Shchors in Alexander Dovzhenko's film of the same name won him the Stalin Prize for 1941. He proceeded to become an iconic film actor of the Joseph Stalin era, playing against Lyubov Orlova in Bright Path and Marina Ladynina in Six P.M. (1944 film; 1946 Stalin Prize). One of his favourite film roles was that of General Skobelev in Heroes of Shipka (1955).

After the Meyerhold theatre was disbanded, Samoylov moved to Nikolay Okhlopkov's Mayakovsky Theatre, where he would work until the director's death in 1967. His role of Oleg Koshevoy in the first stage version of The Young Guard won him another Stalin Prize. One of the highlights of his career was Hamlet in Okhlopkov's production of 1954. It was the first post-war production of the play in the country and led to Okhlopkov's joint work with Peter Brook. In 1961, he was cast as Jason in the first-ever Russian production of Medea by Euripides. Six years later, he appeared in the role opposite Aspasia Papathanassiou of Greece.

In 1967, Samoylov rejoined his colleagues from the Meyerhold Theatre in the Maly Theatre. The greatest success of his declining years was the role of Prince Ivan Shuisky in Tsar Fyodor Ioannovich (1973). "It was a genuine Christian man, living in Christ; I have never seen anything like this", says Georgy Sviridov, who composed music for the production. Samoylov's last film roles came in the movies directed by Sergei Bondarchuk, such as Waterloo and Boris Godunov. The actor celebrated his 90th birthday acting on the stage of the Maly Theatre in 2002. He died on 17 February 2006, aged 93, in Moscow

== Partial filmography ==
- Accidental Meeting (1936) as Grigoriy Rybin
- Tom Sawyer (1936) as Doctor Robinson
- Shchors (1939) as Nikolay – Stalin Prize first degree (1941)
- Tanya (1940) as Aleksei Nikolaevich Lebedev
- Four Hearts (1941) as Don Pablo
- Invisible Jan (1942) as Jani
- David Bek (1944) as Kasyanov
- Six P.M. (1944) as Lieutenant Vasili Ivanovich Kudryashev – Stalin Prize second degree (1946)
- Four Hearts (1945) as First Lieutenant Pyotr Nikitich Kolchin
- Admiral Nakhimov (1947) as Lt. Burunov
- Boy from the Outskirts (1948) as father of Andrey
- Taras Shevchenko (1951) as Nikolay Aleksandrovich Speshnev
- The Unforgettable Year 1919 (1951) as Nekhlyudov's son
- Adventure in Odessa (1953) as Nikolay Yefanov, otets Gleba
- Heroes of Shipka (1955) as General Skobelev
- The Crash of the Emirate (1955) as Mikhail Frunze
- Unfinished Story (1955) as Aleksandr Aganin
- The Alive and the Dead (1964) as commander of a battalion
- The Enchanted Desna (1964) as Colonel Aleksandr Petrovich
- Waterloo (1970) as Cambronne
- They Fought for Their Country (1975) as Marchenko
- Boris Godunov (1986) as monk Pimen

== Awards and honors ==
- Honored Artist of the RSFSR (1947)
- People's Artist of the RSFSR (1954)
- Order of the Red Banner of Labour (1972)
- People's Artist of the USSR (1974)
- Order of the October Revolution (1982)
- Order "For Merit to the Fatherland", 4th class (1997)
- Order "For Merit to the Fatherland", 3rd class (2002)
- Golden Mask (2002)
- Medal "For the Defence of Moscow"
- Medal "For the Development of Virgin Lands"
- Medal "For Valiant Labour in the Great Patriotic War 1941–1945"
- Medal "In Commemoration of the 800th Anniversary of Moscow"
- Medal "In Commemoration of the 850th Anniversary of Moscow"
- Medal "Veteran of Labour"
- Stalin Prize first degree (9141)
- Two Stalin Prizes second degree (1946, 1947)
