= After the Fire Over Russia =

1929 film directed by Boris Grezov

- Directed by: Boris Grezov
- Written by: Boris Grezov
- Starring: Tacho Kolarov; Baronesa Loudon; Konstantin Kisimov; Titi Tarnovska
- Cinematography: Vladimir Termen
- Music by: Maestro Georgi Atanasov
- Release date: 23 September 1929
- Running time: 65 minutes
- Country: Bulgaria
- Languages: Silent; Bulgarian intertitles

After the Fire Over Russia (Bulgarian: След пожара над Русия, romanized: Sled pozhara nad Rusiya) is a 1929 Bulgarian silent drama film directed by Boris Grezov and starring Tacho Kolarov, Baronesa Loudon and Konstantin Kisimov. The film is based on a novel by Pancho Mihaylov. It portrays the lives of a group of White Russians who fled into exile in Bulgarian to work in local mines following the Russian Revolution.

== Cast ==
- Tacho Kolarov as Aleksey Arseniev
- Baronesa Loudon as Nataliya Noykova
- Konstantin Kisimov as Garbitzata
- Titi Tarnovska as Rositza
- Dimitar Keranov as Inzhener Pavel Noykov
- Vladimir Karpov as Stepan
- Docho Kasabov as Dyado Ivan
- Ivan Kasabov
- Vasil Karakanovski
- Rayna Chukleva
- Mihail Slavov

== Bibliography ==
- Taylor, Richard. The BFI companion to Eastern European and Russian cinema. British Film Institute, 2000.
