= Boris Grezov =

Bulgarian actor and film director (1889–1968)

- Born: 4 April 1889; Plovdiv, Bulgaria
- Died: 3 March 1968 (aged 78); Bern, Switzerland
- Other name: Boris Grezhov
- Occupations: Actor, Director, Screenwriter
- Years active: 1920-1949 (film)

Boris Grezov or Boris Grezhov (Bulgarian: Борис Грежов) (April 4, 1889 – March 3, 1968) was a Bulgarian actor and film director. Grezov was one of the pioneers of early Bulgarian cinema, making important silent films such as Maiden's Rock (1922) and After the Fire Over Russia (1929).

== Selected filmography ==
=== Director ===
- Maiden's Rock (1922)
- After the Fire Over Russia (1929)

== Bibliography ==
- Marcel Cornis-Pope & John Neubauer. History of the Literary Cultures of East-Central Europe: Junctures and disjunctures in the 19th and 20th centuries. Volume IV: Types and stereotypes. John Benjamins Publishing, 2010.
- Taylor, Richard. The BFI companion to Eastern European and Russian cinema. British Film Institute, 2000.
