= Tamara Lobova =

Soviet cinematographer (1911–2007)

- Born: Tamara Grigoryevna Lobova; 17 November 1911; Pogar, Russian Empire
- Died: 15 November 2007 (aged 95); Moscow, Russia
- Occupation: Cinematographer
- Spouse: Anatoli Golovnya

Tamara Grigoryevna Lobova (Russian: Тамара Григорьевна Ло́бова; 1911 — 2007) was a Soviet cinematographer who was one of the first women to take up the trade. She was married to fellow cinematographer Anatoli Golovnya, and the pair shot many films together. She was a laureate of the Stalin Prize, second degree (1951).

== Selected filmography ==
- Heart Does Not Forgive (1961)
- The Dragonfly (1954)
- Zhukovsky (1950)
- Admiral Nakhimov (1947)
- Invisible Jan (1942)
- Fighting Film Collection No. 6 (1941)
- General Suvorov (1941)
- Minin and Pozharsky (1939)
- Ruslan and Ludmila (1938)
- No Mistake (1935)
