= Maiden's Rock =

1922 film

- Directed by: Boris Grezov
- Written by: Boris Grezov
- Starring: Boris Grezov; Katya Syoyanova; Vyara Salplieva-Staneva
- Cinematography: Albert Davidov; Charl Keneke
- Production company: Aktzionerno Druzhestvo Luna
- Release date: 30 September 1922
- Country: Bulgaria
- Languages: Silent; Bulgarian intertitles

Maiden's Rock (Bulgarian: Momina skala) is a 1922 Bulgarian silent drama film directed by Boris Grezov and starring Grezov, Katya Syoyanova and Vyara Salplieva-Staneva.

== Cast ==
- Boris Grezov as Stoyan
- Katya Syoyanova as Lilyana
- Vyara Salplieva-Staneva as Gyula
- Mihail Goretzki as Bozhichko, selski kmet
- Dimitar Stoyanov as Trichko
- Yordan Minkov as Doychin, bashtata na Trichko
- Dimitar Keranov as Mladen, priyatel na Stoyan
- Ivan Stanev as Asen. mlad tziganin
- Cherneva as Adzhara, stara tziganka
- Petko Chirpanliev as Hyusein, Tziganski stareyshina

== Bibliography ==
- Marcel Cornis-Pope & John Neubauer. History of the Literary Cultures of East-Central Europe: Junctures and disjunctures in the 19th and 20th centuries. Volume IV: Types and stereotypes. John Benjamins Publishing, 2010.
