= Ivan Naumovich Dubovoy =

Soviet military officer

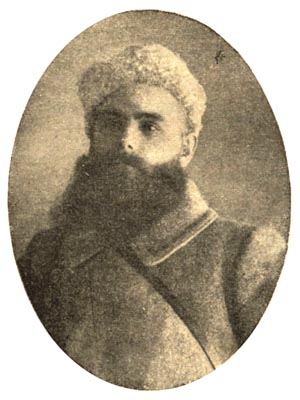
- Dubovoy in 1923
- Born: September 24, 1896; Chyhyryn, Kiev Governorate, Russian Empire]
- Died: July 29, 1938 (aged 41) Kharkov, Ukraine SSR, Soviet Union
- Allegiance: Russian Empire; Soviet Union
- Branch: Imperial Russian Army; Soviet Red Army
- Service years: 1916–1917 (Russian Empire); 1918–1937 (Soviet Union)
- Rank: Komandarm 2nd rank
- Commands: 1st Ukrainian Soviet Army; 44th Rifle Division; Kharkov Military District
- Conflicts: World War I; Russian Civil War; Battle of Kiev; Battle of Tsaritsyn; Polish–Soviet War

Ivan Naumovich Dubovoy (Russian: Ива́н Нау́мович Дубово́й; Ukrainian: Іва́н Нау́мович Дубови́й; September 24, 1896 – July 29, 1938) was a Ukrainian Soviet army commander. He fought for the Imperial Russian Army in World War I before going over to the Bolsheviks in the subsequent Civil War. With fellow Ukrainian Ivan Fedko he secured his hometown for the Red Army. He was a recipient of the Order of the Red Banner.

During the Great Purge, he was arrested on August 21, 1937. On July 28, 1938, he was sentenced to death by the Military Collegium of the Supreme Court of the Soviet Union and executed the following day. After the death of Joseph Stalin, he was rehabilitated in 1956.

== Early years ==
Ivan Dubovoy was born in Chmyrivka in the Chyhyryn district of the Kyiv province (now Cherkasy region, Chihyryn district) into a peasant family. The natives of that region, including his father Naum Ipatiyovych, who worked at the mines of Yuzivka, filled the ranks of the proletariat of Donbas and Kryvorizhye.

== The First World War ==
During the First World War he served in the Tsarist army in the 30th Siberian Rifle Regiment from November 1916. In the memoirs of Nikita Khrushchev, it is mentioned that in 1917, Dubovoy graduated from the school of ensigns. From the "History of Campaigns and Battles..." it is known that this event took place in Irkutsk after the February Revolution. Dubovy became a Red Guardsman and, together with like-minded people, spoke out against the cadets of that school. In the summer of 1917, he joined the ranks of the RSDLP(b).

== Revolution ==
After the October Revolution, he again found himself in Donbas, where he organized Red Guard units at the beginning of 1918. He quickly made a military career: from March 1918 he held the position of military commissar, then commandant, and finally chief of communications of the Central Headquarters of the Red Guards of Donbas.

== From Tsaritsyn to Ukraine ==
Since the summer of 1918, when the Bolsheviks lost power in the Donbas, Dubovoy participated in the defense of Tsaritsyn as part of the Red Guard units. In October of the same year, he became deputy chief of staff of the 10th Army, which was part of the Southern Front of the Russian Army led by Pavel Sytin, later replaced by Pēteris Slavens after prolonged infighting between Sytin, supported by Leon Trotsky, and Kliment Voroshilov, who was backed by Joseph Stalin. Stalin was recalled from Tsaritsyn and Voroshilov, with whom Dubovoy was on fairly friendly terms, was transferred to the post of Chief of Staff of the 1st Cavalry Division.

At the end of 1918, Voroshilov's stay on the banks of the Volga ended when he received the post of People's Commissar for Internal Affairs of Ukraine. In the same way, Ivan Dubovoy's career path also led to Ukraine. At the beginning of 1919, the "brothers" in the defense of Tsaritsyn, who were assigned various positions by fate, received the name "Tsaritsyn" among the Ukrainian military.

== In Ukraine ==
In February 1919, Dubovoy was appointed as Deputy District Military Commissar of the Kyiv district, then deputy to S.K. Matsyletskyi, who led the newly formed Kyiv Front Army. After the creation of the First Ukrainian Soviet Army he held the position of chief of staff, and from the end of May until the end of June he performed the duties of army commander. At that point, having joined the 12th Army of the Western Front of the Red Army, Dubovoy was appointed commander of the 44th Division, created from the 3rd Russian Frontier Army. The division had already suffered losses and was very small in number. After its reinforcement by the more powerful First Ukrainian Soviet Army, the new entity was headed by Mykola Shchors, with Dubovoy as his deputy.

With the death of Shchors on August 30, 1919, Dubovoy took command of the 44th Division, with a short break from September 10 to October 23, while the investigation into the circumstances of Shchors' death continued. Under his leadership, the division fought the "White Poles" and the forces led by Anton Denikin.

== Military career ==
Dubovoy's merits during the war did not go unnoticed by the leadership of the Red Army: from 1924, he held the position of commander of the 14th Corps of the Bolshevik Russian Army, stationed near Kyiv and in Chernihiv. At that time, the corps consisted of the 7th Chernihiv, 45th Volyn and 46th rifle divisions.

In 1926, he completed advanced training courses for senior command staff, and in 1927 he went to Germany for a two-month internship in the Reichswehr troops. Since 1929, he had been appointed as an assistant, and then in 1934, a deputy commander of the troops of the Ukrainian Military District. While working in this position, he was again sent to Germany, where Dubovoy was further acquainted with new weapons, strategy, and tactics.

In 1935, he was made the commander of the troops of the Kharkiv Military District, and a member of the Military Council under the People's Commissariat of Defense of the USSR, commander of the 2nd rank. He published "My Memories of Shchors" in 1935.

== Arrest and execution ==
Dubovoy was arrested on August 20, 1937, by the NKVD, allegedly because of a careless word in defense of his fellow communist fighters, who were subject to repression. While imprisoned he admitted that he had killed his superior Red Army commander Mykola Shchors. According to the verdict of the Military Collegium of the Supreme Court of the USSR dated July 28, 1938, Dubovoy was killed in the Kharkiv NKVD prison. The family was transferred to the Gulag concentration camps of the NKVD.

Dubovoy was rehabilitated on July 14, 1956.

== Compositions ==
- My memories of Nikolay Shchors. To: vartі, 1935.

== Memorials ==
In Kyiv, a street named for Stalin was renamed for Dubovoy in 1961. In Kharkov, a street was formerly named after him.

== Bibliography ==
- Черушев Н. С. Командарм Дубовой Киев: Политиздат Украины, 214 с. 1986
