= Battle of Kiev (December 1919) =

Coordinates: 50.40°N 30.54°E

- Part of the Russian Civil War
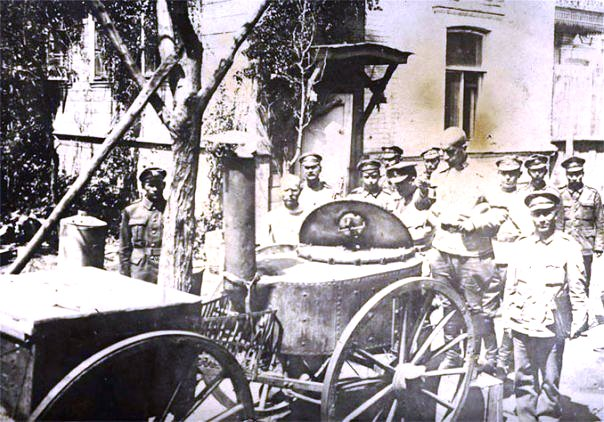
- General Bredov checking a field kitchen in Kyiv, September 1919
Date	December 10–16, 1919
Location	Kiev (Kyiv, Ukraine)
Result	Bolshevik victory

Belligerents
Red Army	(Russia) White Army

Commanders and leaders
Sergei Mezheninov; Ivan Fedko; Ivan Naumovich Dubovoy	(Russia) Abram Dragomirov

The Battle of Kiev of December 1919 was the last of a series of battles fought that year over Kiev, the capital of Ukraine during the Russian Civil War. Following the capture of the city in late August 1919, White forces were expelled from the city by Bolshevik troops.

== Prelude ==
On 14 October 1919 troops of the Red Army retreating from the area of Odesa captured Kyiv after breaking the Volunteer Army's front on the Irpin river. Commanded by Iona Yakir and Yan Gamarnik, the Bolshevik force numbered 5,000 soldiers and forced the White administration and many civilians to retreat across the Dnieper to Darnytsia and Brovary. For the next four days, Kyiv was a scene of fierce battles between the Red Army and white forces attempting to recapture the city. Many officers and part of the personnel of the local Cadet Corps were executed by the Bolsheviks, who also plundered numerous shops and storage facilities.

The White forces established their defensive positions in Pechersk. Following the arrival of storm troops organized by general Dragomirov, White forces under command of Bredov and Nepenin started clearing the city. After heavy fighting in the areas of St. Nicholas Gates and Mariinsky Park, the Bolsheviks started a retreat. On 16 October the counterattacking troops rejoined with part of the officers blocked in the central part of the city and cleared the Podil district. On 17 October the Whites established control over Shuliavka, and on the next day reached the districts of Bilychi and Kurenivka, reestablishing control over the city.

On 20 October a military parade of White troops was organized in St. Sophia Square under the command of general Dragomirov, who awarded participants of the battle. On 22 October metropolitan Antony Khrapovitsky headed a memorial service for the victims of fights in St Volodymyr's Cathedral, which was followed by their funeral at Baikove Cemetery. Following the expulsion of Bolsheviks, an anti-Jewish pogrom started in the city. The temporary loss of control over the city led to a significant fall in the White Army's authority among the local population. During late November and early December several episodes of mass panic emerged, caused by rumours of Kyiv's evacuation in front of a new Bolshevik advance.

== Battle ==
The Kiev operation (December 10–16, 1919) was an offensive operation of the 12th Army under command of Sergei Mezheninov against some 9,000 White Guard troops under command of Dragomirov.

The 58th Infantry Division of the 12th Army was advancing to Kiev from the west, and the 44th Infantry Division from the east. On December 10, the 44th Infantry Division of the 12th Army withdrew to the Dnieper River. On 11 December the Bolsheviks captured Darnytsia and started shelling the city. On 12 December Red Army established its positions in Mykilska Slobidka, and on the next day made an unsuccessful attempt to cross the river. On 14 December generals Bredov and Dragomirov left the city along with the local administration.

On 15 December the White forces supported by aviation performed a counterattack and forced the Reds to abandon Mykilska Slobidka. Simultaneously, a duel between armoured trains employed by both sides took place in the area of Irpin. Due to severe frost, the Dnieper river was covered with ice, and the Bolsheviks used that fact to their advantage. On the night of 15 to 16 December, with the assistance of local fisherman P. K. Alekseenko (Alekseyev), the 44th Infantry Division under command of Ivan Naumovich Dubovoy forced the Dnieper, which was just starting to freeze.

Early on the morning of December 16, the Reds unexpectedly attacked the Whites' positions from the rear and occupied the bridges. After a twelve-hour battle, the Whites retreated. On the same day, the 58th Infantry Division under command of Ivan Fedko entered the city.

== Aftermath ==
The defeat of White forces led to their final retreat from Kyiv.
