= Aleksei Dikiy =

Russian and Soviet actor and theatre director (1889–1955)

- Born: Aleksei Denisovich Dikij; 24 February 1889; Ekaterinoslav, Russian Empire
- Died: 1 October 1955 (aged 66); Moscow, USSR
- Years active: 1909 – 1955
- Awards: Stalin Prize first degree (1946, 1947, 1949, 1950), Stalin Prize second degree (1949)

Aleksei Dikiy (Russian: Алексей Денисович Дикий) (24 February 1889 – 1 October 1955) was a Soviet actor and director who worked at Moscow Art Theatre and later worked with Habima Jewish theatre in Tel Aviv. He was arrested and imprisoned in Gulag under the dictatorship of Joseph Stalin but later played the role of Joseph Stalin in several films.

== Biography ==
=== Ukraine ===
He was born Aleksei Denisovich Dikiy on 24 February 1889 in Ekaterinoslav, Russian Empire. At a young age he moved to Kharkiv, where his sister, Maria Sukhodolska-Dikova, was a popular actress, and she helped him to become an actor. Young Dikiy made his acting debut at the age of 6, on stage of the Kharkiv Drama under the directorship of Oleksi Sukhodolskiy.

=== Moscow ===
In 1909 he moved to Moscow with the assistance of I. Uralov, actor of Moscow Art Theatre. There Dikiy studied acting under S. Khalyutina and K. Mardzhanov. Then Dikiy studied under Konstantin Stanislavski and Vladimir Nemirovich-Danchenko, and was hired as an actor at the Moscow Art Theater in 1910. He admired the stage works of Michael Chekhov and was his partner on stage. In 1922 Dikiy followed Michael Chekhov in the formation of the second Moscow Art Theater, MKhAT-2. There his artistic rivalry with Michael Chekhov turned into a bitter dispute, and Dikiy left Moscow Art Theatre in 1928. At that time he also worked as director with the Jewish Chamber Theatre in Moscow.

=== Tel Aviv ===
In 1928 Aleksei Dikiy received an invitation to work in Tel Aviv as director with Habima, the Jewish theatre troupe that had originated in Russia. Dikiy directed two successful Hebrew-language plays for Habima in the 1928–29 season. On 29 December 1928 he premiered The Treasure, a translation of the Yiddish play Der Oytser by Sholem Aleichem, which became an artistic and financial success. On 23 May 1929 he premiered David's Crown, an adaptation of The Hair of Absalom by Calderón. With the success of Dikiy's directorship Habima became established as a national Jewish theatre, and Dikiy gained an international reputation as an innovative director.

=== Repressions ===
In 1931, back in Moscow, Dikiy started his own theater-studio in Moscow and also taught an acting class. In 1934 Dikiy collaborated with Dmitri Shostakovich on production of the opera Katerina Izmailova (a.k.a. Lady Makbeth of Mtsensk District). Dikiy's production of Katerina Izmailova had over 100 performances in Leningrad and Moscow, and was considered a highlight of his directing career. However, in 1936, Joseph Stalin saw the opera and severely criticized the work of both Dmitri Shostakovich and Dikiy. After Stalin's criticisms both Shostakovich and Dikiy suffered from serious troubles in their lives and careers.

=== Leningrad ===
In 1936, Dikiy was ordered out of Moscow, then he was appointed the director of the Bolshoi Drama Theater (BDT) in Leningrad. There he began his lifelong collaboration and friendship with actor Boris Babochkin. At that time many Russian intellectuals were terrorized by purges and repressions, known as the "Great Terror" under the dictatorship of Joseph Stalin. In 1937 Aleksei Dikiy was arrested on false accusations of anti-Soviet activity. In reality he was a victim of behind-the-scenes manipulations against him by other jealous actors. Dikiy was sentenced and exiled to a Gulag prison-camp in Siberia, where he spent four years until his release in 1941.

=== Comeback ===
Dikiy was not allowed to return to work either in Leningrad or in Moscow, instead he lived and worked in the Siberian city of Omsk for several years during the Second World War. In 1944 Dikiy was cast in the title role as Prince Kutuzov in a Soviet propaganda film Kutuzov (1944), which was also known outside of Russia as 1812. For that role Dikiy was awarded the Stalin Prize and was allowed to work in Moscow as a theater director. His most important works as director were Blokha by Nikolai Leskov and Teni (Shadows) by Mikhail Saltykov-Shchedrin.

=== Stalin ===
After serving time in one of Stalin's Gulag prison-camps in Siberia, Aleksei Dikiy was cast to portray Joseph Stalin in several propaganda films. Stalin approved Dikiy for the role. Stalin became interested in the brilliant actor, after he saw the film Kutuzov (1944). Then Stalin saw Dikiy's performance in the role as Stalin, and sent his security officers to get Dikiy delivered to Kremlin for a brief meeting. Stalin had a drink and told Dikiy that his imprisonment was a must, and that everyone in the country must undergo such experience in exile and prison-camps. Later Dikiy told his students that he played the role of Joseph Stalin as a dangerous, scary, power-hungry dictator. Stalin liked the image of himself made by Dikiy in films.

=== Recognition ===
Stalin was moved by Dikiy's talent and awarded the actor with the Stalin Prize five times, in 1946, 1947, 1949 twice, and 1950. "I am playing not a human, but a granite monument" said Dikiy, alluding to Stalin. Dikiy was designated People's Artist of the USSR (1949). He was nominated for 'Best Actor' and received a special mention at the 1947 Venice Film Festival for the title role in Admiral Nakhimov.

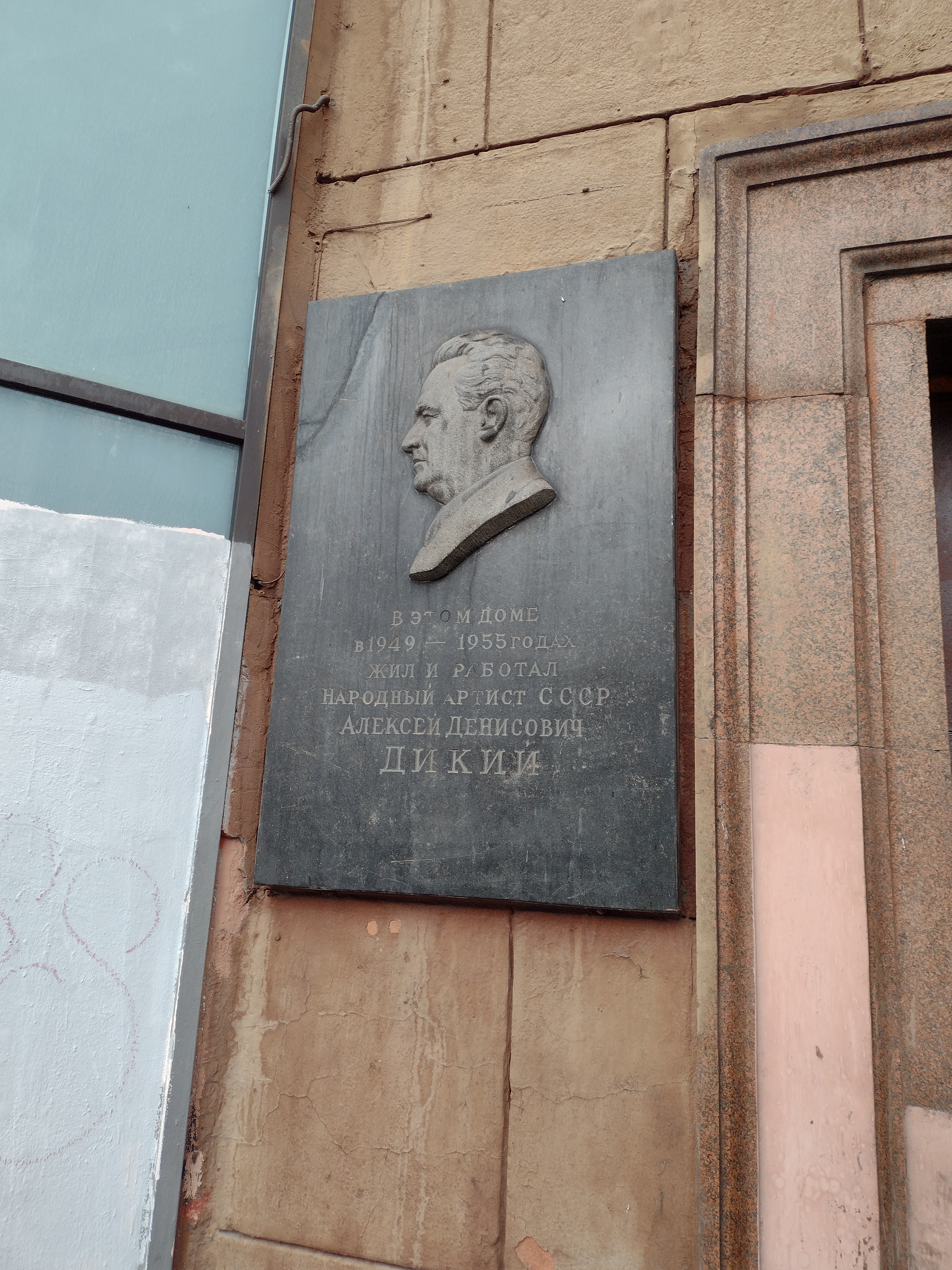
Historical plaque on his home in Moscow.

=== More repressions ===
In 1953 Dikiy directed his last stage production, the play Teni (Shadows), by Saltykov-Shchedrin. Under Dikiy's direction his friend and partner Boris Babochkin played one of his best roles ever – Klaverov, a corrupt career politician, alluding to a typical Soviet bureaucrat. For that work Babochkin was viciously attacked in the official Soviet newspaper Pravda by Ekaterina Furtseva, who was then a Mayor of Moscow and later was made Minister of Culture of the Soviet Union. Furtseva became enraged with Dikiy and Babochkin's satirical portrayal of the Soviet bureaucracy with allusions to the Soviet leadership. She banned the play, and censored both Babochkin and Dikiy from public performances and kept them virtually unemployed for three years until Babochkin was finally forced to repent to the Communist Party.

=== Death ===
Dikiy suffered from many traumatic experiences in his life. The last blow was being a powerless witness of censorship and public humiliation of his friend Boris Babochkin. Official attacks by the Soviet Communist Party caused Dikiy severe emotional trauma, which led to alcoholism, depression and other health problems.

Aleksei Dikiy died of a heart failure on 1 October 1955 in Moscow and was laid to rest in Novodevichy Monastery Cemetery in Moscow.

== Selected filmography ==
actor

- Admiral Nakhimov (1947) – Stalin Prize first degree (1947)
- Pirogov (1947)
- The Third Blow (1948) – Stalin Prize second degree (1949)
- Tale of a True Man (1948)
