= Accidental Meeting (1936 film) =

1936 film by Igor Savchenko

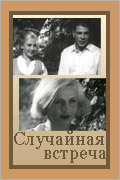
- Russian: Случайная встреча
- Directed by: Igor Savchenko
- Written by: Igor Savchenko
- Starring: Galina Pashkova; Yevgeny Samoylov; Pyotr Savin; Ivan Lobyzovskiy; Konstantin Nassonov; Sergey Nikonov; Valentina Ivashova
- Cinematography: Yuli Fogelman
- Music by: Sergei Pototsky
- Release date: 1936
- Country: Soviet Union
- Language: Russian

Accidental Meeting (Russian: Случайная встреча) is a 1936 Soviet romantic musical film directed and written by Igor Savchenko.

== Plot ==
A new sports instructor, Grisha, arrives at a factory producing children's toys, where Irina, a dedicated and skilled worker, is employed. Recognizing Irina's exceptional talent as a track-and-field athlete, Grisha begins training her for an upcoming national competition in Moscow. As they spend time together, the two fall in love and eventually marry.

Their happiness is disrupted when Irina discovers she is pregnant. Grisha, concerned that this will derail their training and her athletic career, reacts with frustration. Feeling unsupported, Irina decides to raise the child on her own and leaves her husband. Despite the challenges, her coworkers rally around her, offering both emotional and practical support as she juggles motherhood and her athletic ambitions.

With their encouragement and her determination, Irina continues her training. At the national competition in Moscow, she achieves a remarkable victory, securing first place and proving her resilience as both an athlete and a mother.

== Cast ==
- Galina Pashkova as Irina
- Yevgeny Samoylov as Grigoriy Rybin (as E. V. Samoylov)
- Pyotr Savin as Pyotr Ivanovich (as P. N. Savin)
- Ivan Lobyzovskiy as Petya Solovyov, aka Pyatak (as I. A. Solovyov)
- Konstantin Nassonov as The Factory director (as K. A. Nasonov)
- Sergey Nikonov as The driver (as S. N. Nikonov)
- Valentina Ivashova as Tanya (as V. Ivasheva)
