= Shchors (film) =

- Directed by: Oleksandr Dovzhenko; Yuliya Solntseva
- Written by: Oleksandr Dovzhenko
- Starring: Yevgeni Samojlov; Ivan Skuratov; Aleksandr Grechanyy; Aleksandr Khvylya; Nikolai Makarenko; Pyotr Masokha
- Cinematography: Yuri Goldabenko; Yuriy Yekelchik
- Edited by: O. Skripnik
- Music by: Dmitri Kabalevsky
- Distributed by: Kiev Film Studio
- Release date: January 1939
- Running time: 92 minutes
- Country: Soviet Union
- Language: Russian

Shchors (Russian: «Щорс») is a 1939 Soviet biopic film directed by Oleksandr Dovzhenko and Yuliya Solntseva. Commissioned by Joseph Stalin, the film is a biography of the partisan leader and Ukrainian Bolshevik Nikolai Shchors. Shchors is played by Yevgeny Samoylov (1912–2006).

== Synopsis ==
Cheered up by the revolutionary zeal, courage and energy of their leader, Nikolai Alexandrovitch Shchors, in 1919 the peasants and workers' groups gathered in the civil war- devastated Ukraine, to defeat the foreign conquerors and enemies of the revolution. Shchors and his troops advance to Kiev, the seat of the bourgeois nationalists under their leader Symon Petliura, and take over the city. Other villages and towns fall. A bitter struggle with major losses blazes about Berdychiv. But Shchors' revolutionary forces remain victorious.

However, it does not take long until a new danger threatens: this time the Polish Pans enter Ukraine, and General Dragomirov marches to Kiev. Shchors, however, gathers the revolutionary forces of the country and brings them to a victorious counter-attack.

== Cast ==
- Yevgeny Samoylov as Nikolay Shchors (as E. Samoylov)
- Ivan Skuratov as Bozhenko
- Luka Lyashenko as Severin Chernyak / Grandpa Chizh (as L. Lyashenko)
- Yu. Titov as Burdenko - Commander
- P. Krasilich as Gavrichenko - Commander
- Aleksandr Grechany as Mikhaylyuk - Commander (as A. Grechanyy)
- Nikolai Makarenko as Antonyuk - Commander (as N. Makarenko)
- Yuriy Bantysh as Soldier (as Yu. Bantysh)
- Dmitry Barvinsky as Soldier (as D. Barvinskiy)
- Dmitry Kostenko as Soldier (as D. Kostenko)

== Production ==
Petro Kralyuk of the National University of Ostroh Academy claimed in 2020 that this film was ordered to be made by Joseph Stalin in order to make Mykola Shchors a mythical hero. The script had to be reworked more than once, throwing out already filmed episodes of the film and shooting new ones. The film was made during Stalin's Great Purge during which many of Mykola Shchors fellow fighters were executed after being convicted of being traitors. The stress this caused lead to director Oleksandr Dovzhenko having a heart attack.
