= Admiral Nakhimov (film) =

1946 film by Vsevolod Pudovkin

- Directed by: Vsevolod Pudovkin
- Written by: Igor Lukovsky
- Starring: Aleksei Dikiy; Ruben Simonov
- Cinematography: Anatoli Golovnya; Tamara Lobova
- Music by: Nikolai Kryukov
- Production company: Mosfilm
- Release date: 2 January 1947
- Running time: 93 minutes (2,541 meters)
- Country: Soviet Union
- Language: Russian

Admiral Nakhimov (Russian: Адмирал Нахимов) is a 1947 Soviet biopic film directed by Vsevolod Pudovkin, based on the life of Russian Admiral Pavel Nakhimov (1802-1855). In 1946 Pudovkin, Golovnya, Lukovsky, Kryukov, Dikiy, Simonov, and Knyazev received the Stalin Prize.

== Production ==
The movie had to be remade after the Communist Party of the Soviet Union viewed it as having historical inaccuracies and too many "parties and dancing." Therefore, they recruited Vsevolod Pudovkin to recreate the film, where he removed the love story, "toned down" the dance scenes, and made other changes.

Admiral Nakhimov (1946)

== Plot ==
The film tells the story of Admiral P. S. Nakhimov (1802–1855), a talented Russian naval commander known for his progressive views on naval warfare. In 1853, as war with Turkey looms, Nakhimov, a bearer of the proud combat traditions of the Russian navy, proposes a direct strike by the Russian fleet on the Bosporus to protect the Black Sea coast from Turkish invasion. However, the narrow-minded and arrogant courtier Menchikov rejects Nakhimov's plan. Turkey declares war on Russia.

With a small fleet, Nakhimov charges into Sinop Bay, boldly forcing a battle against the much larger Turkish fleet. He defeats it, capturing a group of Turkish admirals, including Osman Pasha. The brilliant Russian victory in the Battle of Sinop enrages Russia's enemies. A powerful anti-Russian coalition forms, led by British conservatives and French Emperor Napoleon III. The combined Anglo-French-Turkish fleet, including many steam-powered ships, approaches the Crimean shores and blocks Sevastopol.

Russian sailors flood their own sailing fleet, blocking enemy ships from entering Sevastopol Bay. The defense of Sevastopol begins, with Admiral Nakhimov at its heart. During the repulsion of an enemy attack, Nakhimov is killed at Malakhov Kurgan. Over his body, the defenders of Sevastopol swear allegiance and devotion to their homeland.

== Cast ==
- Aleksei Dikiy as Admiral Nakhimov
- Ruben Simonov as Pasha Osman
- Leonid Knyazev as Pyotr Koshka
- Boris Olenin as Jean-Jacques Pelissier
- Vladimir Vladislavsky as Capt. Lavrov
- Yevgeny Samoylov as Lt. Buronov
- Vsevolod Pudovkin as Prince Menshikov
- Nikolai Chaplygin as Kornilov
- Vasili Kovrigin as Baranovsky
- Pyotr Sobolevsky as Feofan Khristoforovich Ostreno
- Alexander Khokhlov as Napoleon III
- Pavel Gaideburov as Lord Raglan
- Georgy Gumilevsky as sailor
- Emmanuil Geller as episode
- Gennady Rozhdestvensky as Conductor
- Nikolai Brilling as Captain Evans

== Response ==
=== Criticism ===
Stalin said this about the film: "Pudovkin, for instance, undertook the production of a film on Nakhimov without studying the details of the matter, and distorted historical truth. The result was a film not about Nakhimov but about balls and dances with episodes from the life of Nakhimov".

=== Awards ===
- Award at the 8th Venice International Film Festival for the best crowd scenes, an honorary diploma for his performance as Nakhimov (Aleksei Dikiy)
- Best Cinematography at the Locarno International Film Festival in 1947.
- Stalin Prize I degree in 1947 (awarded to director Vsevolod Pudovkin, cinematographer Anatoli Golovnya, screenwriter Igor Lukowski, composer Nikolai Kryukov, actors Aleksei Dikiy, Ruben Simonov, Leonid Knyazev).
