= Konstantin Kisimov =

Bulgarian actor (1897–1965)

Konstantin Vasilev Kisimov
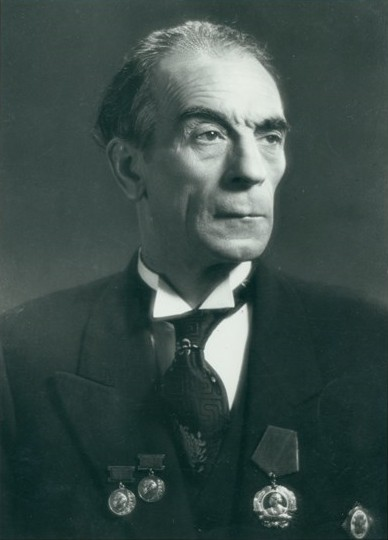
- Kisimov in 1954
- Born: 16 April 1897; Veliko Tarnovo, Bulgaria
- Died: August 16, 1965 (aged 68); Balchik, Bulgaria

Konstantin Vasilev Kisimov (Bulgarian: Константин Василев Кисимов) was a Bulgarian stage and film actor born in 1897, deceased in 1965.

== Biography ==
He was born in the family of revolutionaries and enlighteners. His father had studied International law in Cambridge University. Naturally Konstantin followed his example and started studying law in the Sofia University and then in the Sorbonne. His love for the stage changed his life. He was admitted to the Acting school of the Ivan Vazov National Theatre and spent there a year before going in on a specialization in Paris in 1924 from where he returned in 1928. At first he was devoted to the theatre, but soon started his career in cinema. He took part in some of the first Bulgarian movies. He went on to become one of the most famous Bulgarian actors until the 1960s. His most notable role was that of Kolcho Slepetsa (Kolcho The Blind) in Pod igoto (1952). Other notable appearances include those in Kalin Orelat (1950), Geroite na Shipka (1955) and Hitar Petar (1960). Konstantin Kisimov died in a car accident in Balchik where he had taken part in a play. A number of Bulgarian theatres and theatrical schools bear his name.

== Filmography ==
- After the Fire Over Russia (1929) as Garbitzata
- Bezkrustni grobove (1931) as Rangel
- Gramada (1936) as Tzeko
- Izkuplenie (1947) as Stoyan Hadzhigladnev
- Kalin orelat (1950) as Dyado Stoyan
- Pod igoto (1952) as Kolcho slepetza
- Geroite na Shipka (1955) as Suleiman Pasha
- Tochka parva (1956) as Barmaley
- Haydushka kletva (1958) as Yordancho Krastata
- Stublenskite lipi (1960) as Dyado Mishon
- Hitar Petar (1960) as Hadzhi Kostaki
- Vyatarnata melnitza (1961) as Dyado Balyu
- Privarzaniyat balon (1967) as Slepiyat (final film role)
