= Zahari Zhandov =

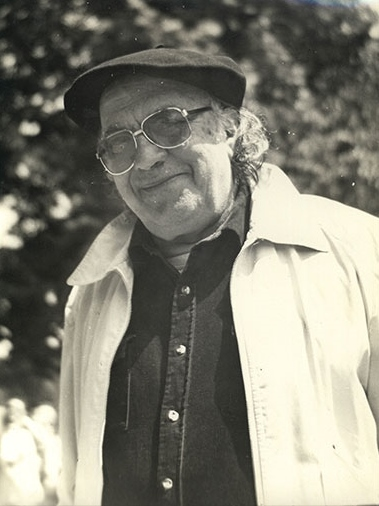
Zahari Zhandov

Zahari Zhandov (Bulgarian: Захари Жандов) (1 June 1911 – 2 February 1998) was a Bulgarian film director, script writer and cinematographer. He was born on 1 June 1911 in the city of Rousse. At first he studied mathematics and then administrative sciences at Free University of Political and Economic Sciences, today UNWE in Sofia. His debut in film-making was with the a short documentary One Day in Sofia (Edin den v Sofia, 1946). Later he came to direct films like Shibil (1968), Birds Come Flying to Us (Ptitzi dolitat, 1971) and The Master of Boyana (Boyanskiyat maystor, 1981). Zhandov got a Golden palm nomination at the Cannes Film Festival in 1957 for the film Earth (Zemya). In 1969 he was a member of the jury at the 6th Moscow International Film Festival.

He died on 2 February 1998 in Sofia.

== Career ==
=== Director ===
- One Day in Sofia (Edin den v Sofia) (1946)
- People in the Clouds (Hora sred oblatzite) (1946)
- Alarm (Trevoga) (1951)
- Septembrists (Septemvriytzi) (1954)
- Earth (Zemya) (1957)
- Beyond the Horizon (Otvad horizonta) (1960)
- The Black River (Chernata reka) (1964)
- Awakened After Ages (Razbudeni sled vekove) (1964)
- Shibil (1968)
- Birds Come Flying to Us (Ptitzi dolitat) (1971)
- The Master of Boyana (Boyanskiyat maystor) (1981)

=== Writer ===
- One Day in Sofia (Edin den v Sofia) (1946)
- People in the Clouds (Hora sred oblatzite) (1946)
- Awakened After Ages (Razbudeni sled vekove) (1964)
- Shibil (1968)
- Birds Come Flying to Us (Ptitzi dolitat) (1971)
- The Master of Boyana (Boyanskiyat maystor) (1981)

=== Cinematographer ===
- One Day in Sofia (Edin den v Sofia) (1946)
- People in the Clouds (Hora sred oblatzite) (1946)
- Alarm (Trevoga) (1951)
