= Georgi Stamatov =

Bulgarian writer

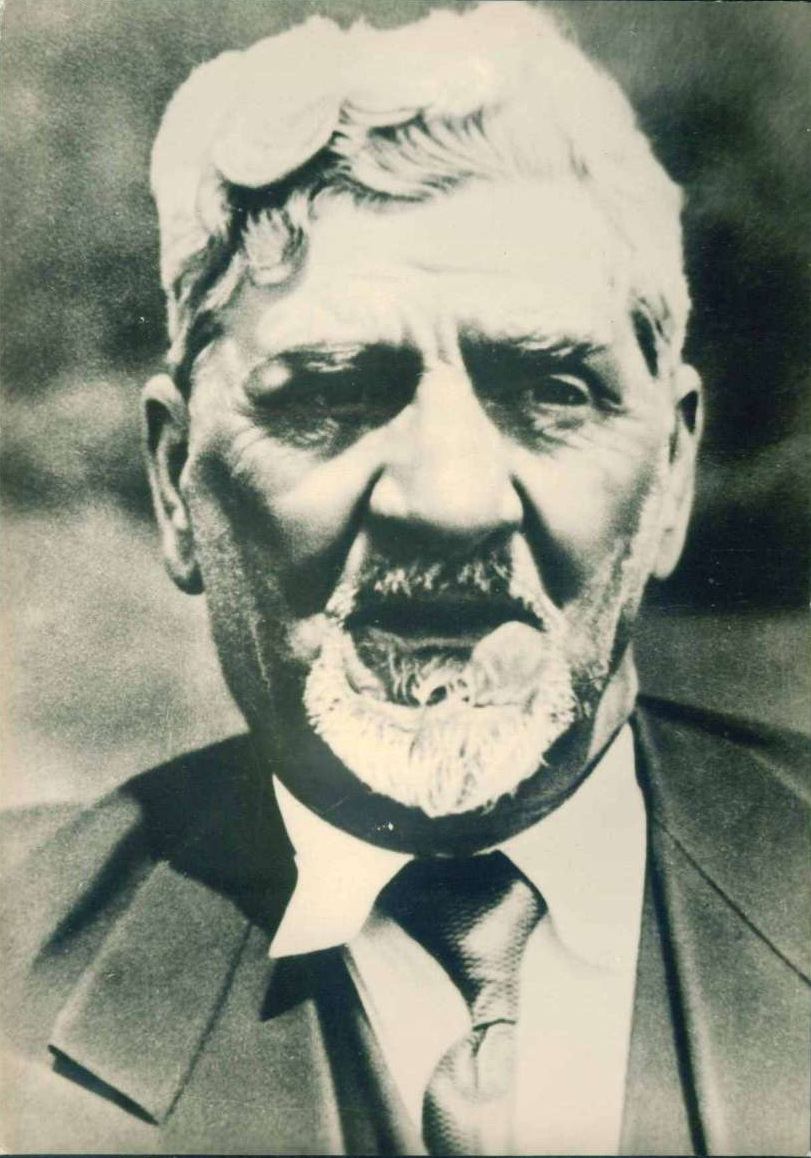
Portrait of G. P. Stamatov

Georgi Porfiriev Stamatov (Bulgarian: Георги Порфириев Стаматов, 25 May 1869 – 9 November 1942) was a Bulgarian writer.

He is not to be confused with the actor and director Georgi Stamatov (1893–1965).

He was born in Tiraspol, Bessarabia (then part of the Russian Empire), and until his teens believed himself to be Russian. His father moved to Bulgaria after the war of liberation in 1879, and Georgi joined him three years later. He graduated from military school in Sofia, and was an officer in an artillery regiment for a short time, but did not care for this career and instead began to study law at Sofia University. For most of his life he worked as a judge.

Although his first published work was a poem (1890), he did not consider himself a poet and for the most part wrote pessimistic and ironic short stories set in provincial cities. His first story was published in the journal Thought in 1893, and much of his work is scattered among periodicals, with small book-size compilations appearing in 1905, 1915, and 1929. He died in Sofia in 1942.

== Selected works ==
=== Stories (selected) ===
- "Dimo Vestovoy"
- "Paladin"
- "Little Sodom"
- "Viryanov"
- "Narzanovi"

== Gallery ==
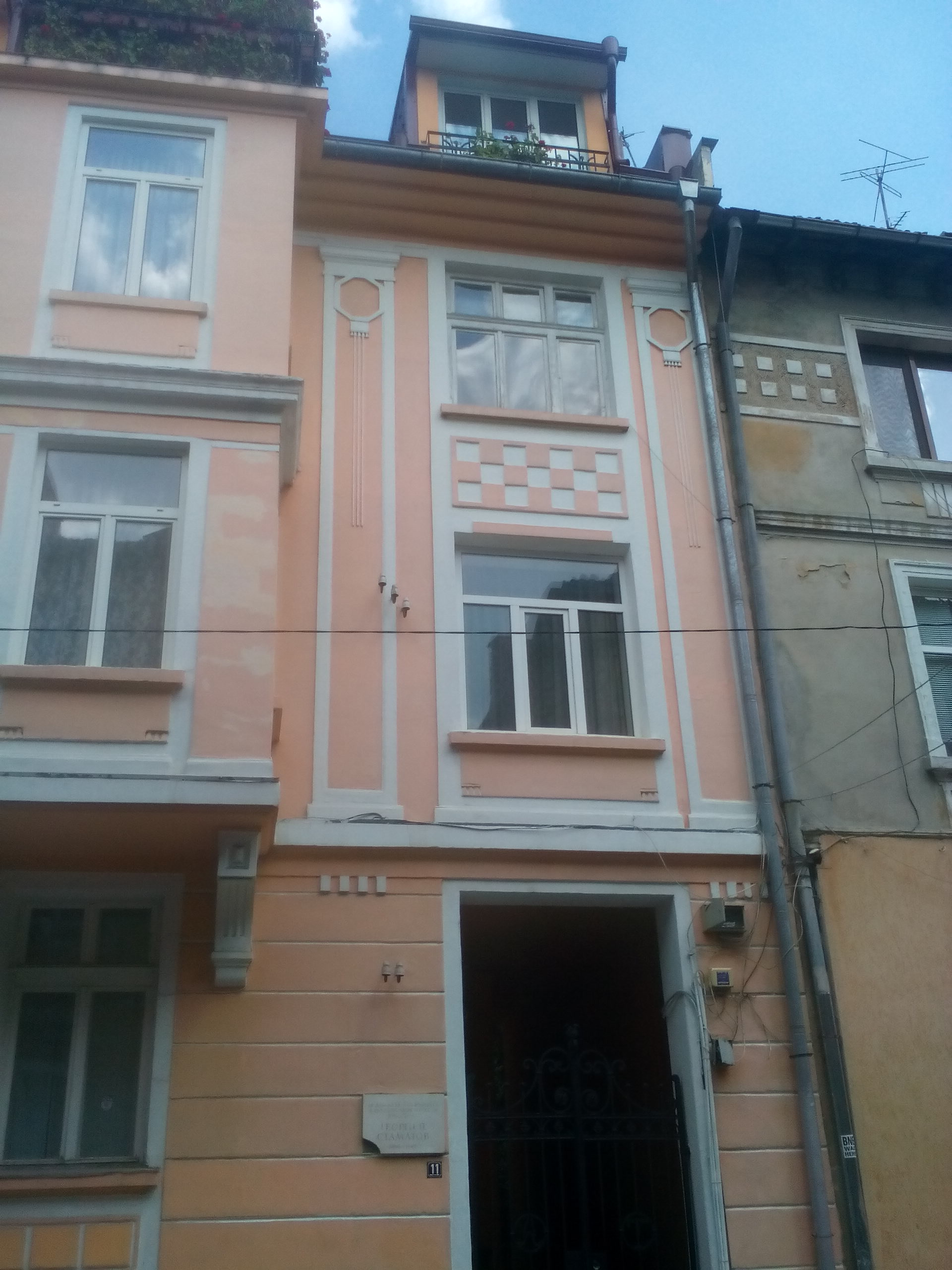
The house in Sofia where Stamatov spent the last years of his life

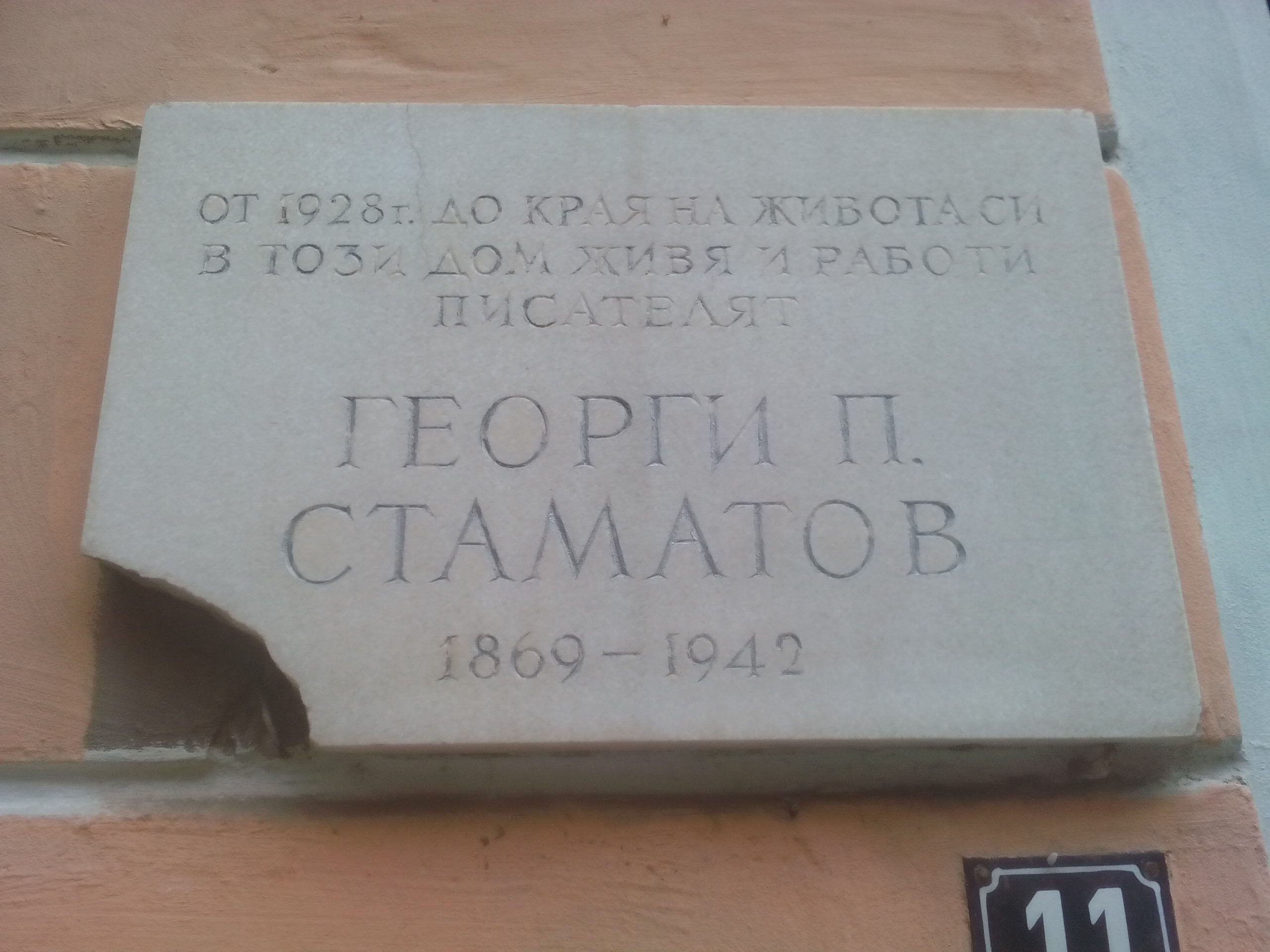
G. P. Stamatov's memorial plaque

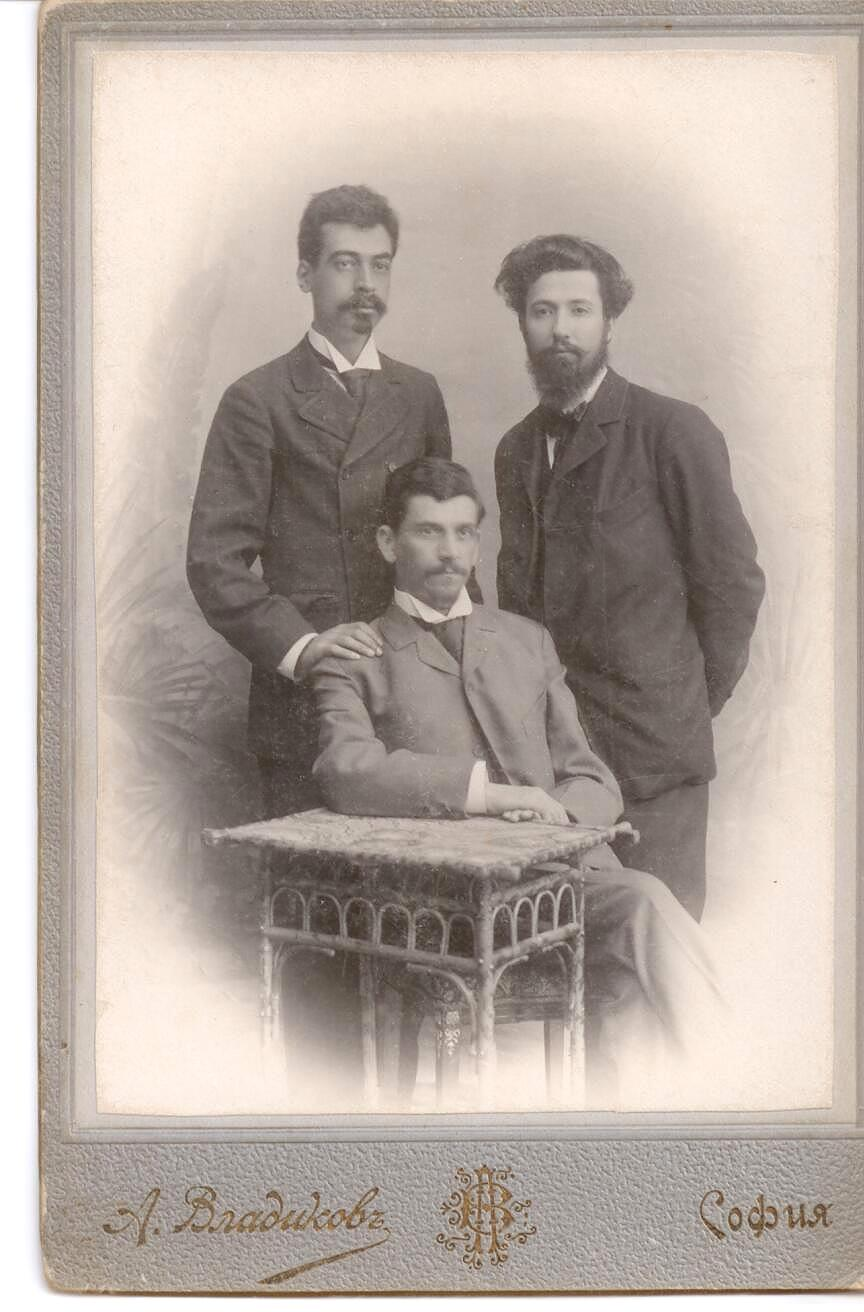
Photo of Peyo Yavorov, Mihail Gerdzhikov and Georgi P. Stamatov, 1901-1902
