= Earth (1957 film) =

1957 film

- Земя
- Directed by: Zahari Zhandov
- Written by: Veselin Hanchev; Elin Pelin
- Produced by: Doncho Todorov
- Starring: Bogomil Simeonov
- Cinematography: Boncho Karastoyanov
- Edited by: Elena Popova
- Release date: 4 March 1957
- Running time: 102 minutes
- Country: Bulgaria
- Language: Bulgarian

Earth (Bulgarian: Земя, romanized: Zemya) is a 1957 Bulgarian drama film directed by Zahari Zhandov. It was entered into the 1957 Cannes Film Festival.

== Cast ==
- Bogomil Simeonov - Enyo
- Slavka Slavova - Stanka
- Ginka Stancheva - Tzveta
- Elena Hranova - Tzveta's Mother
- Stefan Petrov - Ivan
- Kunka Baeva - Ana
- Borislav Ivanov - Bazuneka
- Nikolay Doychev - Ilcho
- Lyubomir Bobchevski
- Naicho Petrov
- Hristo Dinev
- Stefan Kuyumdzhiev
- Dimitar Peshev
- Mara Andonova
- Nikola Dadov
- Teofan Chranov
- Trifon Dzhonev
