= Item One =

1956 film

- Directed by: Boyan Danovski
- Written by: Valeri Petrov
- Produced by: Hristo Karaneshev
- Starring: Rumyana Chokoyska
- Cinematography: Vasil Holiolchev
- Edited by: Borislav Penev
- Release date: 26 November 1956
- Running time: 77 minutes
- Country: Bulgaria
- Language: Bulgarian

Item One (Bulgarian: Точка първа) is a 1956 Bulgarian drama film directed by Boyan Danovski. It was entered into the 1956 Cannes Film Festival.

== Cast ==
- Rumyana Chokoyska - Veska
- Zheni Bozhinova - Veska's mother
- Ruzha Delcheva - the chairwoman
- Konstantin Kisimov - Barmaley
- Asen Ruskov - Maestroto
- Veselin Boyadzhiev - Uragan
- Hristo Hranov - Shishko
- Dimo Bakalov - Kircho
- Stefan Dimitrov - Vladko
- Panayot Mihaylov - Vasich
- Ivan Bratanov - the chimney-sweeper
- Ivan Tonev - the workman
- Rangel Vulchanov -
