= Lyubimets 13 =

- DVD cover
- Directed by: Vladimir Yanchev
- Written by: Lyuben Popov; Vladimir Yanchev
- Produced by: Dimitar Geoshev
- Starring: Apostol Karamitev; Ginka Stancheva
- Cinematography: Georgi Georgiev
- Edited by: Donka Dimcheva
- Music by: Petar Stupel
- Distributed by: Bulgarian Cinematography; Feature Films Studio of Sofia
- Release date: 15 December 1958
- Running time: 89 minutes
- Country: Bulgaria
- Language: Bulgarian

Lyubimets 13 (Bulgarian: Любимец 13, English: Favourite 13) is a comedy movie released in Bulgaria in 1958. It was directed by Vladimir Yanchev and written by Lyuben Popov and Vladimir Yanchev. The film tells an amusing story about the efforts of three soccer clubs to attract the player of the day. But when the player’s twin brother - a hopeless gambler - decides to take the initiative...
And to put the thin lid on it all, a pretty girl stays in the middle...

== Plot ==
They are two brothers… and they are twins. Radoslav is a young and talented soccer player, playing in a team from Varna, while Radosvet is an impossible gambler, chased by the police. Radoslav meets the beautiful Elena on the beach and they fall in love. However, she is from Sofia and soon takes the train home. After a bit of confusion, instead of the address of Elena, Radoslav gets a completely useless piece of paper. Elena seems like a lost dream but he is soon determined to go to Sofia, walk along the streets and find her.

In the meantime, three soccer teams, one of which from Sofia, decide to bid for Radoslav and send agents to Varna to negotiate with him. As Radoslav is already in Sofia, the negotiators encounter Radosvet. Of course, our gambler decides to take the best out of the situation and, pretending to be Radoslav, signs a contract with the club from Sofia.

Now both brothers are in Sofia. Radoslav keeps on searching for his Elena without the slightest suspicion of his brother’s intrigues. But Radosvet is the one hitting the jackpot, meeting Elena. However, his behavior is unbearably impudent; she slaps his face and does not want to see him anymore. Clearly, she does not suspect that this is not Radoslav. A few moments later, when by the will of fortune, she finally meets the true Radoslav, all her anger is transferred over him. He manages to clarify the situation and they both go to see the first game of Radosvet, who plays with number 13. Of course, the team of Radosvet is defeated, after a myriad of comic situations. It becomes clear to everyone that both brothers have switched places. Radoslav gets the offer to go to play in Sofia, but he declines it and with Elena leaves for Varna.

== Cast ==
- Apostol Karamitev - Radoslav and Radosvet
- Ginka Stancheva - Elena
- Lyubomir Bobchevski - The Old Man
- Elena Hranova - Granny Tinka
- Pencho Petrov - Strogov
- Georgi Radanov - Valyo Valchanov
- Nadezhda Vakavchieva - Mammy Nevyana
- Georgi Karev - Gogo
- Petko Karlukovsky - Petzi
- Magda Kolchakova - Pena
- Encho Bagarov - Rasho Chukov
- Georgi Partsalev - Gocho Polyanski
- Lyubomir Bodurov - The Tenor
- Leo Konforti
- Georgi Kaloyanchev

== Special notes ==
- Boyana Film is often credited for making the Bulgarian films after 1950. However, the studio was officially established in 1962, accommodating the previously available facilities.
