= Apostol Karamitev =

Bulgarian actor (1923–1973)

- Born: 17 October 1923; Burgas, Bulgaria
- Died: 9 November 1973 (aged 50); Sofia, Bulgaria

Apostol Milev Karamitev (Bulgarian: Апостол Милев Карамитев) (1923–1973) was a Bulgarian actor, popular throughout the 1960s.

== Biography ==
He studied acting under the guidance of B. Danovski. Later he specialized in Moscow, Leningrad, Prague and Warsaw. His debut was in the movie "Utro nad rodinata" (Dawn over the Fatherland) in 1951. Arguably, his most famous role was that of the twin-brothers Radosvet and Radostin in the black and white classic Lyubimetz 13 (Favourite number 13). He died before finishing his last film, "Svatbite na Yoan Asen" (The marriages of Yoan Asen), and Kosta Tsonev had to take over his role.

== Filmography ==
- Utro nad Rodinata (1951) as Velizarov
- Pod igoto (1952) as Dyakon Vikenti
- Nasha Zemya (1952) as Kapitan Velkov
- Pesen za Choveka (1954) as Budinov
- Geroite na Shipka (1955) as Petka
- Tova se Sluchi na Ulitzata (1956) as Misho
- Legenda za Lyubovta (1957) as Ferhad
- Haydushka Kletva (1958) as Strahil
- Lyubimetz 13 (1958) as Radoslav / Radosvet
- Patyat Minava prez Belovir (1960) as Inzhener Stamen Petrov
- Három Csillag (1960) as Mihail
- Noshtta Sreshtu 13-i (1961) as Todor Primov / Petar Primov
- Dvama pod Nebeto (1962) as Stefo
- Spetzialist po Vsichko (1962) as Apostol
- Ritzar bez Bronya (1966) as Vuychoto na Vanyo
- Byalata Staya (1968) as Petar Aleksandrov
- Heimlichkeiten (1968) as Colonel Damyanov
- Svoboda Ili Smart (1969) as David Todorov
- Edin Snimachen Den (1969) as Aktyorat
- Svatbite na Yoan Asen (1975) as Yoan Asen (final film role)
