= Sosnovka, Sosnovskoye Rural Settlement =

Sosnovka Сосновка
- Selo
- Location within Perm Krai Location within Russia
- Coordinates: 57°26′N 57°37′E
- Country: Russia
- Region: Perm Krai
- District: Beryozovsky District
- Time zone: UTC+5:00

Sosnovka (Russian: Сосновка) is a rural locality (a selo) and the administrative center of Sosnovskoye Rural Settlement, Beryozovsky District, Perm Krai, Russia. The population was 215 as of 2010.
