= Mykola Shchors monument =

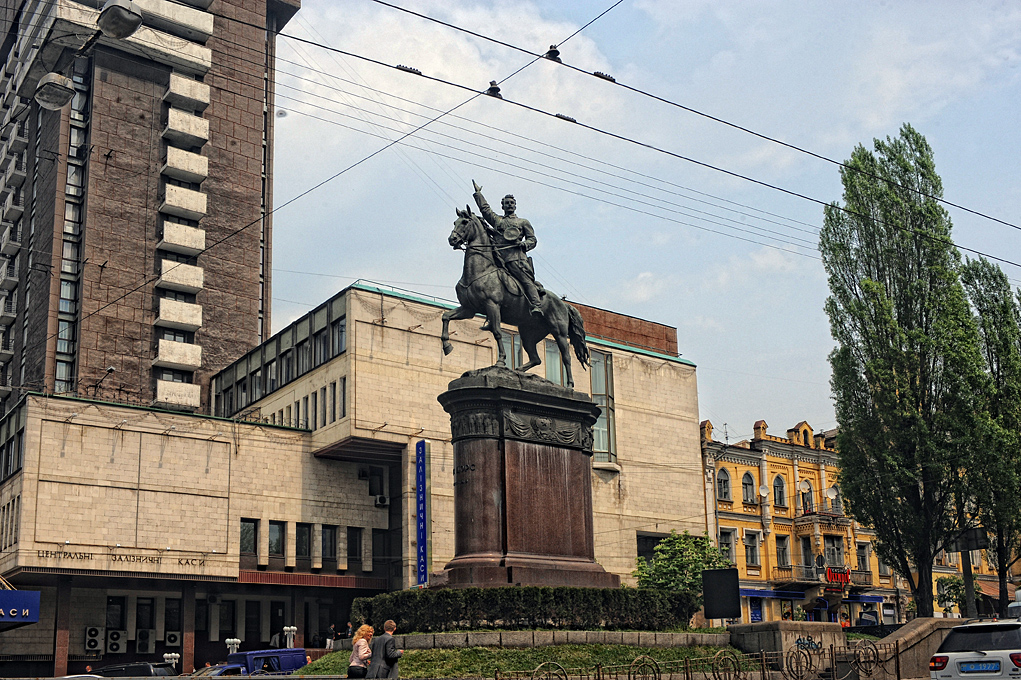
- Shchors monument in Kyiv in 2011
- Interactive map of Mykola Shchors monument
- Location: Intersection of Symona Petliury Street and Taras Shevchenko Boulevard in Kyiv, Ukraine
- Coordinates: 50°26′43″N 30°30′03″E
- Designer: Sculptors Mykhailo Lysenko, Mykola Sukhodolov, Vasyl Borodai and architects Oleksandr Vlasov and Oleksiy Zavarov
- Type: Equestrian statue
- Material: Bronze and granite
- Height: 13.8 m (45 ft)
- Beginning date: 1940
- Completion date: 1954
- Opening date: 1954
- Dedicated to: Mykola Shchors
- Dismantled date: 9 December 2023

The Mykola Shchors monument was an equestrian statue to Red Army commander (and member of the Russian Communist Party) Mykola Shchors erected in 1954, and located at an intersection of Symona Petliury Street and Taras Shevchenko Boulevard, Kyiv, Ukraine, that was dismantled on 9 December 2023.

== History ==
Mykola Shchors was a participant in the Russian Civil War serving as Red Army commander, member of the Russian Communist Party. In 1918–1919 he fought against the newly established Ukrainian government of the Ukrainian People's Republic. Later he commanded the Bohunsky regiment, brigade, 1st Soviet Ukrainian division and 44th rifle division against the head of the Ukrainian People's Republic and their Polish allies. Shchors was killed in battle with soldiers of the Ukrainian Galician Army near the Biloshytsi village (near Korosten) in Zhytomyr Oblast on 30 August 1919. Shchors died after receiving a bullet in the back of his head. After being ignored for more than a decade Shchors became a glorified character in the Soviet Union following the mid-1930s.

The initiator of the monument had been Joseph Stalin in 1936. In the 1930s (and 1940s and 1950s) the Soviet authorities issued numerous orders to erect monuments to Shchors in many cities in the Soviet Union. Work on this monument began in 1940, but World War II held back the unveiling of the monument to 1954. The monument was unveiled in 1954 specifically for the anniversary of the 300th anniversary of the Pereiaslav Agreement of 1654.

The monument was an equestrian statue with a total height of 13.8-meter. The statue was made of bronze and placed on a granite pedestal 6.5-meter high. This pedestal was decorated with a cornice and a frieze with bas-reliefs depicting episodes of the Ukrainian–Soviet War. The monument weighed a reported 7 tons.

Following the February 2014 Revolution of Dignity the authorities planned to dismantle the monument in accordance with the law prohibiting names of Communist origin and Ukrainian nationalists had desecrated the monument (multiple times). During the Russian aerial attacks of the 2022 Russian invasion of Ukraine the monuments of Kyiv were sandbagged and protected, the only exception being the monument to Shchors. The monuments was dismantled on 9 December 2023. It was moved to the Ukraine State Aviation Museum.

== Gallery ==
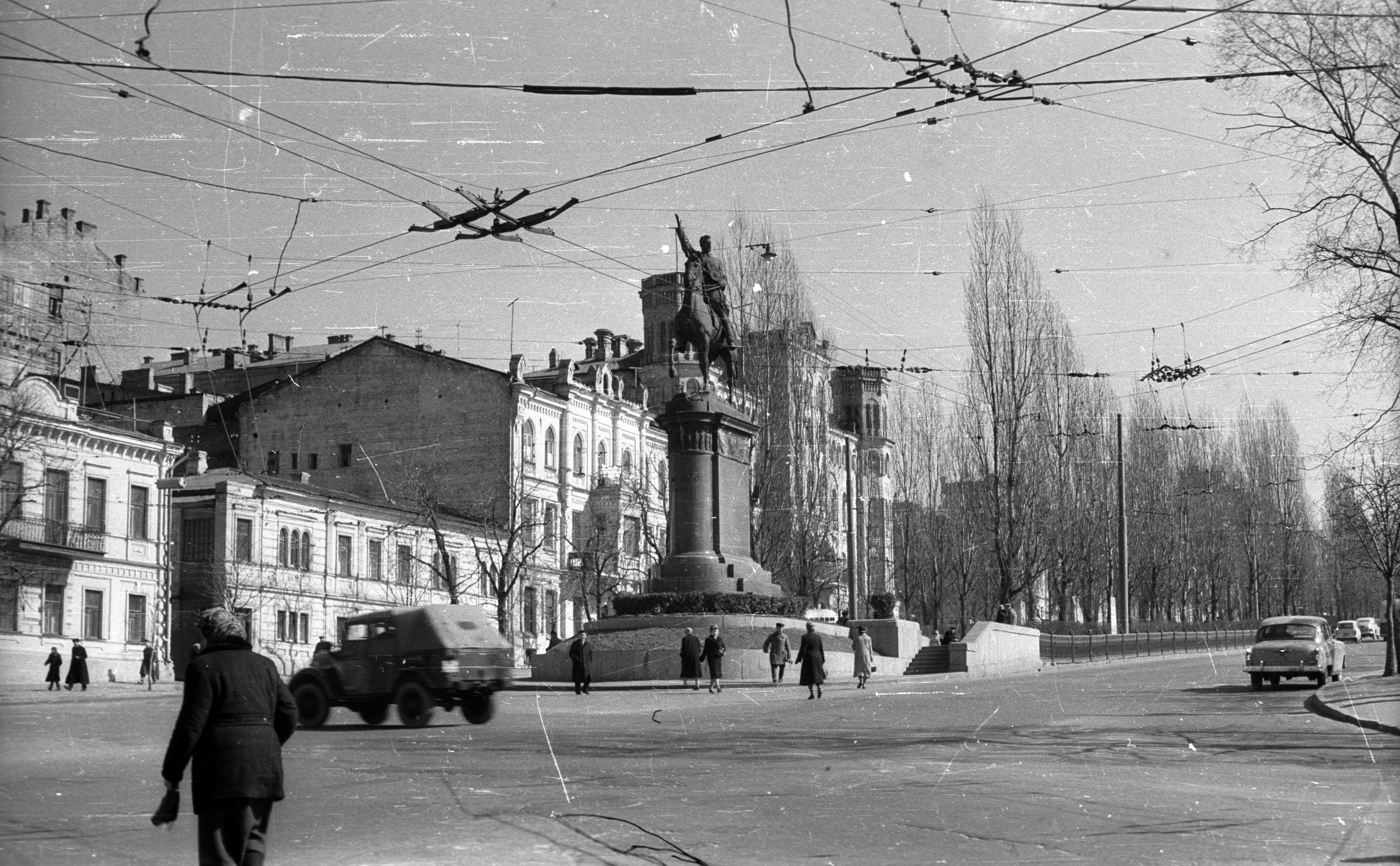
Shchors monument in Kyiv in 1961

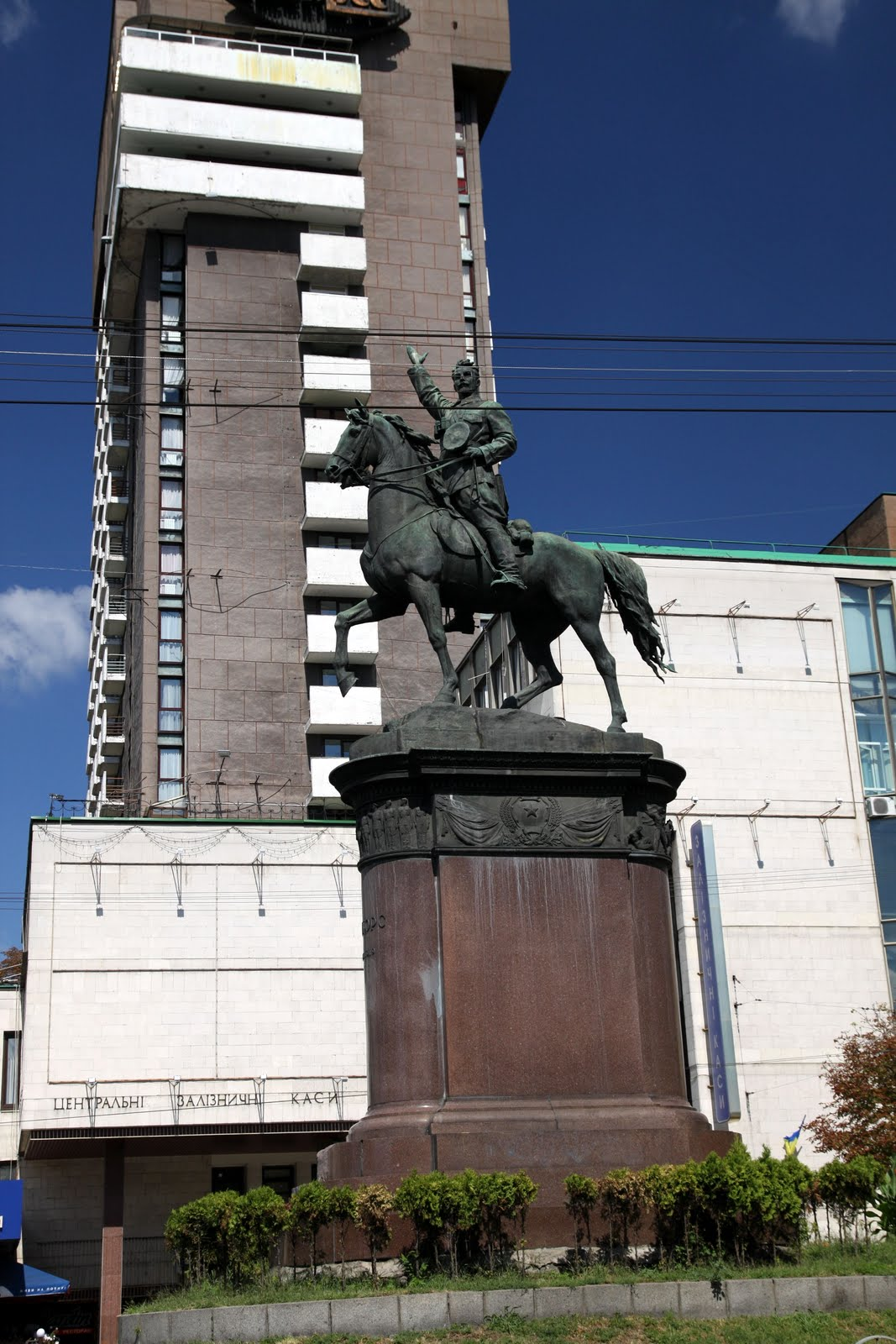
Shchors monument in Kyiv in 2010

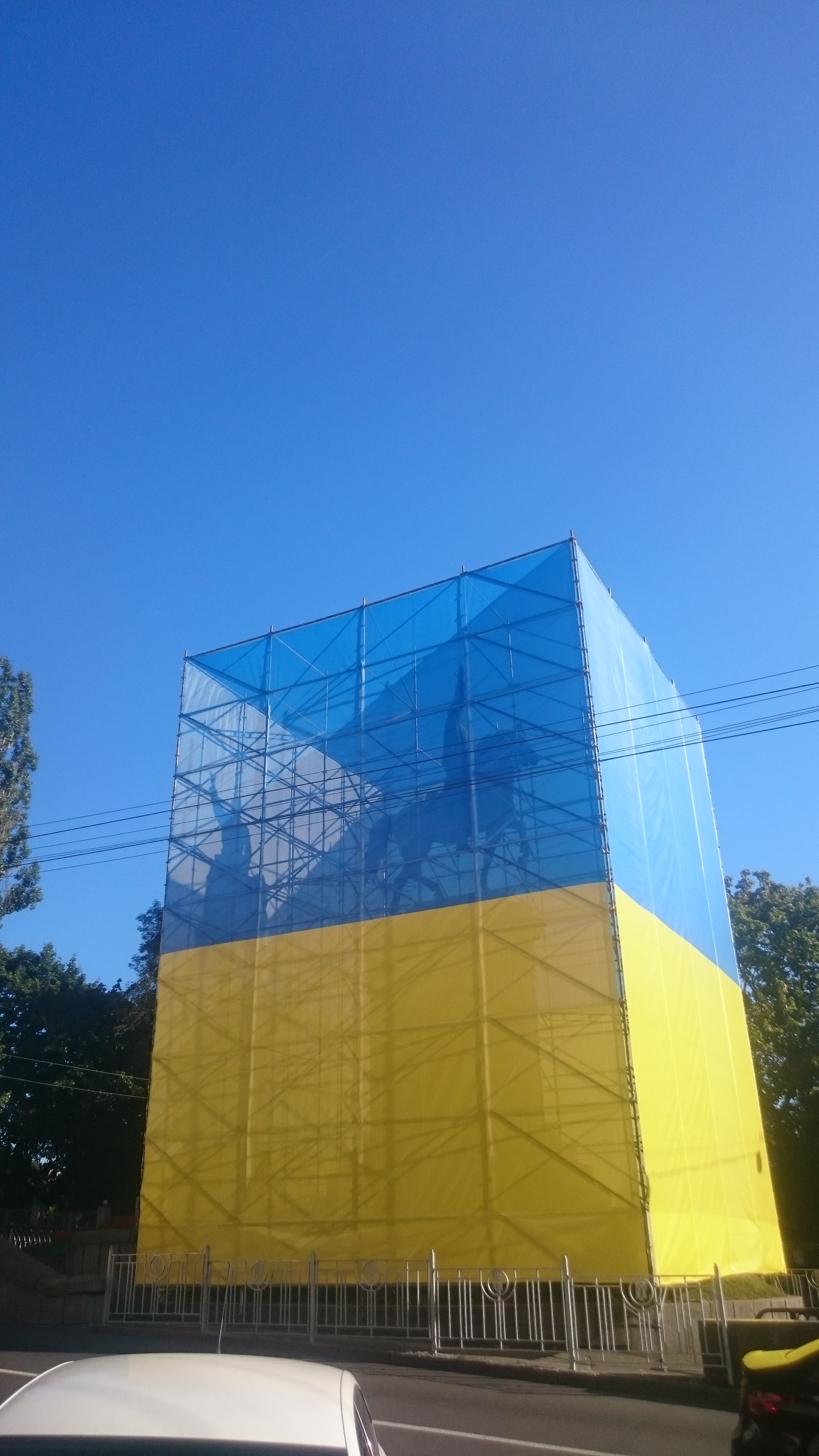
The monument in Kyiv in 2016

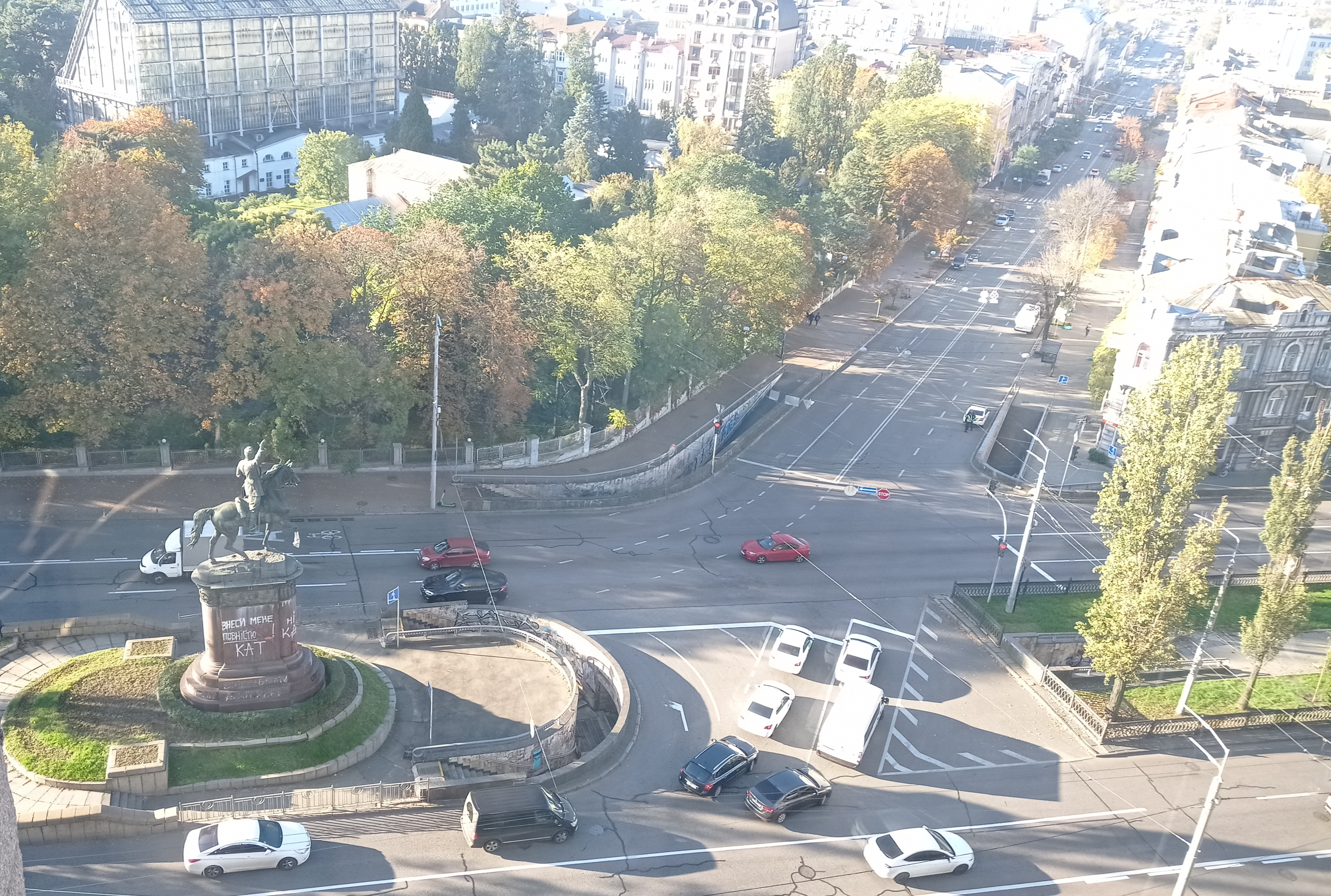
The monument in 2022, including graffiti, translating to slogans such as "demolish me completely!" and "butcher"

== See also ==
- Demolition of monuments to Vladimir Lenin in Ukraine
- Demolition of monuments to Alexander Pushkin in Ukraine
