= Heroes of Shipka =

Geroi Shipki
- Geroite na Shipka – Original Bulgarian poster
- Directed by: Sergei Vasilyev
- Written by: Arkadi Perventsev
- Starring: Ivan Pereverzev; Apostol Karamitev; Viktor Avdyushko; Georgi Yumatov
- Cinematography: Mihail Kirilov
- Edited by: Yelena Bazhenova
- Music by: Petar Stupel, Nikolay Kryukov
- Distributed by: Lenfilm
- Release date: 25 February 1955 (USSR)
- Running time: 137 minutes
- Countries: Soviet Union; Bulgaria
- Languages: Russian; Bulgarian

Geroite na Shipka (Bulgarian: Героите на Шипка; Russian: Герои Шипки, Geroi Shipki; in English: Shipka heroes; US title: Heroes of Shipka) is a 1955 Soviet Union/Bulgarian co-production historical drama film. It tells the story of the famous Battle of Shipka Pass during the Russo-Turkish War of 1877–78. The production companies behind the film are Boyana Film, Bulgar Film and Lenfilm.

The film won the Best Director Award at the 1955 Cannes Film Festival.

== Cast ==
- Ivan Pereverzev as Katorgin
- Viktor Avdyushko as Osnobishin
- Georgi Yumatov as Cossack Sashko Kozir
- Konstantin Sorokin as Makar Lizyuta
- Petko Karlukovsky as Borimechkata
- Apostol Karamitev as Petka
- Anatoli Alekseyev as Timofei
- Yevgeny Samoylov as Gen. Skobelev
- Aleksandr Smirnov as Strukov
- Nikolai Massalitinov as Gorchakov
- Nikolai Simonov as Otto von Bismarck
- Bruno Freindlich as Gyula Andrássy
- Stefan Pejchev as Panayot
- Zheni Bozhinova as Boyka
- Katya Chukova as Ionka
- Vladimir Taskin as Benjamin Disraeli
- Dako Dakovski as Sultan Abdul Hamid II
- Konstantin Kisimov as Suleiman Pasha
- Encho Tagarov as Osman Pasha
- Vladimir Chobur as Stoletov
- Sergei Papov as Iosif Gurko
- Gancho Ganchev as Dukmasov

== Crew ==
- Original Music:

Nikolai Kryukov
Filip Kutev

- Cinematography:

Mikhail Kirillov

- Film Editing

Yelena Bazhenova

- Production Design

Mikhail Bogdanov
Gennady Myasnikov
Georgi-Dzhon Popov

- Costume Design

Nevena Baltova
Pepa Misirkova
Yevgenia Slovtsova

- Makeup

Vasili Goryunov

- Sound Department

Boris Antonov
Aleksandr Babij
Kuzman Shopov
