= List of Soviet films of 1940 =

A list of films produced in the Soviet Union in 1940 (see 1940 in film).

== 1940 ==
Title	Russian title	Director	Cast	Genre	Notes
1940
The Beloved	Любимая девушка	Ivan Pyryev	Marina Ladynina	Drama	
Disappearance of 'The Eagle'	Гибель «Орла»	Vasily Zhuravlyov	Nikolai Annenkov	Thriller	
Experiments in the Revival of Organisms	О́пыты по оживле́нию органи́зма	D.I. Yashin		Documentary	
The Foundling	Подкидыш	Tatyana Lukashevich	Veronika Lebedeva, Dima Glukhov, Faina Ranevskaya	Comedy, drama	
Gorky 3: My Universities	Мои университеты	Mark Donskoy	Nikolai Valbert	Drama	
The Law of Life	Закон жизни	Boris Ivanov, Aleksandr Stolper	Daniil Sagal	Drama	
Musical Story	Музыкальная история	Aleksandr Ivanovsky, Gerbert Rappaport	Sergei Lemeshev	Musical comedy	
My Love	Моя любовь	Vladimir Korsh	Lidiya Smirnova	Comedy	
Siberians	Сибиряки	Lev Kuleshov			
Salavat Yulayev	Салават Юлаев	Yakov Protazanov	Arslan Muboryakov	Biopic	
Tanya	Светлый путь	Grigori Aleksandrov	Lyubov Orlova, Yevgeny Samoylov, Elena Tyapkina	Musical comedy	
Timur and His Team	Тимур и его команда	Aleksandr Razumny			
Yakov Sverdlov	Яков Свердлов	Sergei Yutkevich	Leonid Lyubashevsky	Drama	

== See also ==
- 1940 in the Soviet Union
