= List of Soviet films of 1929 =

A list of films produced in the Soviet Union in 1929 (see 1929 in film).

== 1929 ==
Title	Original title	Director	Cast	Genre	Notes
1929
Arsenal	Арсенал	Alexander Dovzhenko	Semen Svashenko, Mykola Nademsky	War film	
The Blue Express	Голубой экспресс	Ilya Trauberg	Sergei Minin	Drama	
Comet	Комета	Valéry Inkijinoff	Galina Kravchenko, Pyotr Repnin, N.P. Belyaev	Drama	Lost film
Flag of a Nation	Флаг нации	Vladimir Shmidtgof	Boris Azarov, Sergei Minin, Yuri Sergeevich Lavrov	Drama	
Fragment of an Empire	Обломок империи	Fridrikh Ermler	Emil Gal, Sergey Gerasimov	Drama	
The General Line	Старое и новое	Sergei Eisenstein	Marfa Lapkina	Drama	
The Happy Canary	Веселая канарейка	Lev Kuleshov	Galina Kravchenko, Andrey Fayt, Ada Vojtsik, Sergey Komarov	Adventure	
An Hour with Chekhov	Чины и люди	Mikhail Doller, Yakov Protazanov	Mikhail Tarkhanov, Mariya Strelkova, Andrey Petrovsky, Ivan Moskvin	Comedy	
The House on the Volcano	Дом на вулкане	Hamo Beknazarian	Hrachia Nersisyan, T. Ayvazyan, Tatyana Makhmuryan	Drama	
The Lame Gentleman	Хромой барин	Konstantin Eggert	Mikhail Klimov	Drama	
The Last Attraction	Последний аттракцион	Ivan Pravov, Olga Preobrazhenskaya	Naum Rogozhin, Raisa Puzhnaya, Alexander Sashin, Ivan Bykov	Adventure	
The Living Corpse	Живой труп	Fyodor Otsep	Vsevolod Pudovkin, Maria Jacobini, Viola Garden	Drama	
Man with a Movie Camera	Человек с киноаппаратом	Dziga Vertov		Documentary, experimental	
My Grandmother	Chemi bebia	Kote Mikaberidze	Aleksandre Takaishvili, Bella Chernova	Comedy, experimental	
The New Babylon	Новый Вавилон	Grigori Kozintsev, Leonid Trauberg	Yelena Alexandrovna Kuzmina, Pyotr Sobolevsky, Sergei Gerasimov, Vsevolod Pudovkin	History, drama	
Post	Почта	Mikhaïl Tsekhanovskii		Animation, short	
Road into the World	Дорога в мир	Boris Shpis	Valeriy Solovtsov, Yanina Zhejmo, Alexander Zavyalov	History	
Saba	Саба	Mikheil Chiaureli	Aleksandre Jaliashvili, Veriko Anjaparidze	Drama	
In Spring	Весной	Mikhail Kaufman		Documentary	
Third Youth	Третья молодость	Vladimir Shmidtgof	Yuri Sergeevich Lavrov, Nikolay Lebedev, Andrei Lavrentiev	Comedy	Lost film
Turksib	Турксиб	Viktor Alexandrovitsh Turin		Documentary	
Two-Buldi-Two	Два-Бульди-два	Nina Agadzhanova, Lev Kuleshov	Sergey Komarov, Vladimir Kochetov, Anel Sudakevich	Drama	

== See also ==
- 1929 in the Soviet Union
