= Two-Buldi-Two =

1929 film

- Russian: Два-Бульди-два
- Directed by: Nina Agadzhanova; Lev Kuleshov
- Written by: Osip Brik; Philip Hopp
- Starring: Sergey Komarov; Vladimir Kochetov; Anel Sudakevich; Andrey Fayt
- Cinematography: Aleksandr Shelenkov; Pyotr Yermolov
- Release date: 1929
- Country: Soviet Union
- Language: Russian

Two-Buldi-Two (Russian: Два-Бульди-два) is a 1929 Soviet silent film directed by Nina Agadzhanova and Lev Kuleshov.

The film tells the story of circus performers during the Civil War.

== Plot ==
Two-Buldi-Two (1929)

The film is set in 1919, during the Russian Civil War. A small Russian town is under threat of capture by the White Guard forces. The Bolsheviks call on the population to defend the town. The son of an old clown, Buldi Jr., leads the formation of a militia made up of circus performers.

Despite fierce fighting, the well-armed White forces manage to capture the town. Days of White terror ensue, and Buldi Jr. is arrested and faces execution. His father pleads with the White Colonel to spare his son, as they are about to perform their long-awaited joint act, "Two-Buldi-Two," a dream of the old clown's life.

Even on the day of the performance, the old man waits for his son's arrival, unaware that the Colonel has already ordered his execution. The old clown, as usual, steps into the ring alone. Suddenly, during his act, Buldi Jr. bursts into the circus, pursued by soldiers. The agility and strength of the circus performer helps him outwit his pursuers and escape through the circus dome window. Buldi Sr. applauds his son enthusiastically.

Later, Buldi Jr. meets his father again, who has now come to understand the meaning and goals of the revolutionary struggle, among the ranks of the Red Army.

== Cast ==
- Sergey Komarov
- Vladimir Kochetov
- Anel Sudakevich
- Andrey Fayt
- S. Sletov
- Mikhail Zharov
- Vera Maretskaya
- Nikolai Yarochkin
- Aleksandr Chistyakov
- S. Polyakov
- Vladimir Uralskiy
- Aleksandr Gromov
