= Dokhunda =

- Russian: Дохунда
- Directed by: Lev Kuleshov
- Written by: Sadriddin Aini; Osip Brik
- Produced by: G. Kharlamov
- Starring: Kamil Yarmatov; T. Rakhmanova; Semyon Svashenko; Sergey Komarov; R. Petrov
- Cinematography: Konstantin Kuznetsov
- Release date: 1934
- Country: Soviet Union
- Language: Russian

Dokhunda (Russian: Дохунда) is a 1934 Soviet drama film directed by Lev Kuleshov.

== Plot ==
The film tells about the powerless laborer Edgor, who is popularly called "Dokhunda", who starts a new life in Tajikistan. The film is based on the novel with the same title by Tajik national poet Sadriddin Ayni, but the project was regarded with suspicion by the authorities as possibly exciting Tajik nationalism, and stopped. No footage survives. In 1956, director Boris (Besion) Kimyagarov (1920–1979) was finally able to get approval for a movie version of Dokhunda.

== Cast ==
- Kamil Yarmatov as Edgor
- T. Rakhmanova as Giulnor
- Semyon Svashenko as Sabir
- Sergey Komarov as Azim-Shakh
- R. Petrov as Big Chief Oaqsaqual
