= Miss Mend =

1926 film

- Directed by: Boris Barnet; Fedor Ozep
- Written by: Boris Barnet; Fedor Ozep; Vasili Sakhnovsky
- Starring: Igor Ilyinsky; Boris Barnet; Vladimir Fogel; Natalya Glan; Sergei Komarov
- Cinematography: Yevgeni Alekseyev
- Production company: Mezhrabpom-Rus
- Release date: 1926
- Running time: 250 minutes
- Country: Soviet Union
- Language: Silent

The full film

Miss Mend (also known as The Adventures of the Three Reporters) is a 1926 Soviet spy film, originally realised in three parts, directed by and starring Boris Barnet and Fyodor Otsep. It is loosely based on the adventure novels Mess-Mend by Marietta Shaginyan. The story follows the adventures of three reporters who try to stop a biological attack on the USSR by powerful Western businessmen.

The surviving print is just over four hours long. The film was restored by David Shepard, and released on DVD in December 2009 by Flicker Alley.

== Cast ==
- Natalia Glan - Vivian Mend, secretary
- Boris Barnet - Barnet Champion, tabloid-press reporter
- Vladimir Fogel - Vogel, press-photographer
- Igor Ilyinsky - Tom Hopkins, clerk
- Ivan Koval-Samborski - Arthur Stern
- Sergey Komarov -Chiche
- Peter Repnin - bandit
- Natalia Rozenel - Elizabeth Stern
- Vladimir Ural - policeman
- Dmitri Kapka - passenger
- Mikhail Zharov -
- Michael Rosen Sanin -
- Tatiana Mukhina - homeless Kolka
- Anel Sudakevich - stenographer
- Irina Volodko -
- P. Poltoratsky -
- S. Goetz - John, Vivian's nephew
