= Vladimir Fogel =

Russian actor (1902–1929)

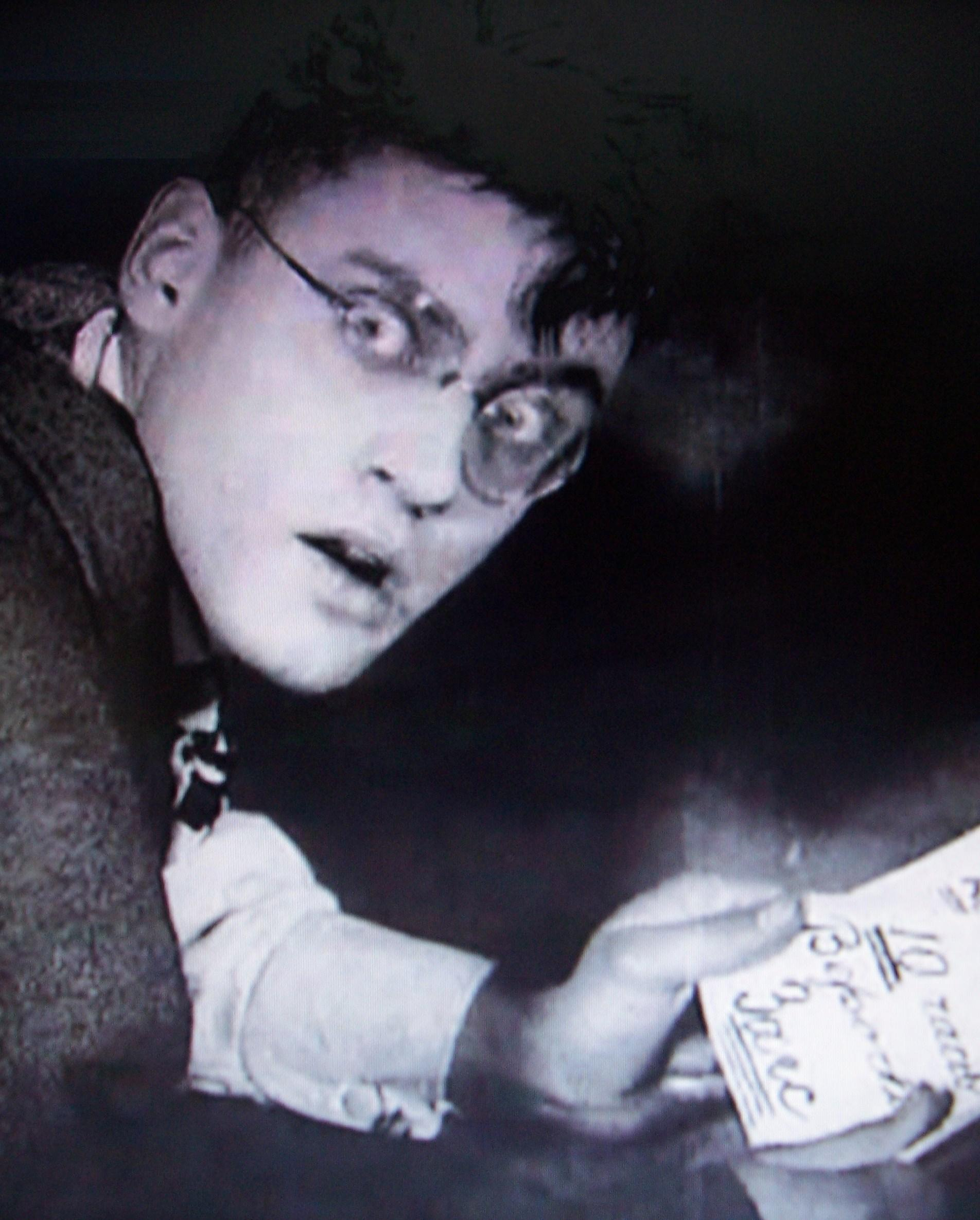
- Fogel in Chess Fever (1925)
- Born: 1902; Moscow, Russia
- Died: 9 June 1929 (aged 26–27); Moscow, Soviet Union
- Occupation: Actor
- Years active: 1924–1928
- Spouse: Tamara Atamanova
- Children: 1

Vladimir Pavlovich Fogel (Russian: Владимир Павлович Фогель; 1902 – 9 June 1929) was a Russian silent film actor.

== Biography ==
Vladimir Fogel was born in Moscow. His family name comes from his German father, an immigrant who worked as an accountant despite hardly speaking any Russian. Fogel's education in the Saint Petersburg State Institute of Technology was terminated by the October Revolution. After spending some years traveling around Russia, he returned to Moscow and enrolled to the newly opened National Film School to study acting.

His teacher was Lev Kuleshov, who later called Fogel an "ingenious cinema actor — the best in our generation." Kuleshov was the one who introduced Fogel to the world of cinema with The Extraordinary Adventures of Mr. West in the Land of the Bolsheviks (1924) where he played a small part and also dubbed Boris Barnet during his most dangerous trick: climbing on the cable that tears and sends him straight into the window. He had bigger roles in Kuleshov's other films, such as The Death Ray and By the Law. Among Fogel's fellow students were acclaimed Soviet actors and directors: Vsevolod Pudovkin, Boris Barnet, Porfiri Podobed, Aleksandra Khokhlova, Valéry Inkijinoff, Sergei Komarov. All of them formed what became known as Kuleshov's Collective. Besides acting and directing, they also studied acrobatics, boxing, driving, fencing, photography and other disciplines. According to Kuleshov, Fogel mastered all of them and was capable of basically everything.

From 1924, Fogel had worked in cinema. His first big role happened in 1925 in the popular comedy short Chess Fever, co-directed by Pudovkin. Fogel quickly turned into one of the leading Soviet comedy actors of the silent era, along with Igor Ilyinsky, who was his partner in Miss Mend and The Doll With Millions. Despite his comedy career, Kuleshov saw him as a serious drama actor and thus gave him a tragic role of a murderer in Jack London's adaptation By the Law, which is often praised as Fogel's best role. Another acclaimed drama film with Fogel in the lead was Bed and Sofa, loosely based on the lives of Vladimir Mayakovsky, Lilya Brik, and her husband.

The actor worked very intensively, making four movies per year, which led to nervous breakdowns and health problems. In 1929 he committed suicide which came as a great shock to everyone. As Lev Kuleshov wrote, "Fogel, mercilessly overloaded with uninteresting work, became schizophrenic and committed suicide. Seems like it was an inherited illness. His brother, a flying ace, ended similarly: he jumped out of a plane after setting a flight altitude record."

Fogel was buried at the Donskoye Cemetery.

== Filmography ==
- The Extraordinary Adventures of Mr. West in the Land of the Bolsheviks (1924) as cocky young man
- Luch Smerti (1924) as fascist
- Chess Fever (1925) as The Boy
- The Three Million Trial (1926) as Man with a binocular
- Po Zakonu (1926) as Michael Dennin
- Miss Mend (1926) as Vogel - Reporter
- The Girl with a Hatbox (1927) as Fogelev
- Bed and Sofa (1927) as Volodia, the friend
- The End of St. Petersburg (1927) as German Officer
- Who Are You? (1927)
- Kukla s millionami (1928) as Paul Cuisinai
- Dom na Trubnoy (1928) as Mr. Golikov - hairdresser
- The Yellow Ticket (1928) as Baron's son-in-law (as V.P. Fogel)
- Salamander (1928) as Bankier

== See also ==
- Igor Ilyinsky
- Anna Sten
- Anatoli Ktorov
