= Porfiri Podobed =

Soviet filmmaker and actor

- Порфирий Подобед
- Born: 16 October 1886
- Died: 9 November 1965 (aged 79); Moscow, Russian SFSR, Soviet Union
- Occupations: Film director, actor
- Spouse: Lydia Redega-Podobed

Porfiri Artemyevich Podobed (Russian: Порфирий Артемьевич Подобед; 16 October [O.S. 3 October] 1886 — 9 November 1965) was a Soviet film director, actor and manager at the Moscow Art Theatre.

== Early life ==
Porfiri Podobed came from a Russian Orthodox family of Artemy Podobed and Elena Fyodorovna Karry (1868–1932), a well-known opera singer at the Bolshoi Theatre and a stepsister of Vasily and Vladimir Nemirovich-Danchenko. In 1910 Porfiri finished the Sea Cadet Corps in Saint Petersburg in the rank of michman. As a Gardes-Marine he took part in the 1908 Messina earthquake rescue and was awarded for it. In 1909, he was promoted to midshipman, and on December 6, 1912, to lieutenant.

In 1915 Podobed joined the World War I. He served aboard the Gangut battleship and took part in the Gulf of Finland mining for which he was awarded the 3rd class Order of Saint Stanislaus. On 19 October a mutiny happened among the lower ranking members which led to an investigation and a trial. According to the memoirs of one of the rebels, Dmitry Ivanov, Podobed was relieved of duty for expressing support for the sailors, but was later restored and returned to war. Ivanov also claimed that Podobed helped underground revolutionaries. Following the October Revolution he took part in the Russian Civil War and served in the Soviet Navy headquarters under Aleksandr Nemits.

== Career ==
In 1918 Podobed took a managing position at the Moscow Art Theatre headed by his relative Vladimir Nemirovich-Danchenko. He left it in 1919, but regained in 1921 following the demobilization and worked there up until 1926. He was one of the founders of the MKhAT Museum. His correspondence with Nemirovich-Danchenko contains many important facts about the theatre life during the New Economic Policy. Also in 1918 Podobed performed his first role in the Swamp Mirages drama movie directed by Victor Tourjansky and based on the Swamp Lights novel by Vasily Nemirovich-Danchenko. The film was released only in 1923 and is considered lost today.

In 1919 Podobed joined the Moscow Film School and then — the famous Kuleshov's Collective headed by Lev Kuleshov where he studied cinematography along with Vsevolod Pudovkin, Boris Barnet, Vladimir Fogel and other acclaimed actors/directors. Kuleshov highly regarded his discipline and commitment, and in 1924 he gave Podobed the leading role of a goofy American John West in one of the first Soviet comedies The Extraordinary Adventures of Mr. West in the Land of the Bolsheviks. He later performed in several other movies by Kuleshov.

In 1929 Vsevolod Meyerhold decided to make his directorial debut with Eugeny Bazarov, a film adaptation of the Fathers and Sons novel by Ivan Turgenev. He invited Podobed to be his assistant. The troubled pre-production lasted for three years, and the movie was finally abandoned.

From 1930 to 1943 Podobed worked predominately with Yakov Protazanov, first as a camera assistant and then — as an assistant director and a co-director. From 1942 on he worked at Mosnauchfilm (known as Voentechfilm during the World War II) dedicated to popular science and educational films. He also taught filmmaking from 1920 to 1939.

== Death ==
Porfiri Podobed died on 9 November 1965 aged 79. He was buried at the Moscow Armenian Cemetery near his mother Elena Karry and his wife fr:Lydia Redega (Lydia Konstantinovna Redega-Podobed (1888–1946)), a ballerina and ballet master at the Moscow Art Theatre Musical Studio.

== Filmography ==
Year	Title	Original title		
Year	Title	Original title	Function	Role
1918/1923	Swamp Mirages (lost film)	Болотные миражи	actor	
1924	The Extraordinary Adventures of Mr. West in the Land of the Bolsheviks	Необычайные приключения мистера Веста в стране большевиков	actor	Mr. John West
1925	The Death Ray	Луч смерти	actor	engineer Podobed
1926	By the Law	По закону	actor	Dutchy
1927	The Yellow Ticket	Земля в плену	actor	
1929	Eugeny Bazarov (unfinished film)	Евгений Базаров	assistant director	
1929	The Living Corpse	Живой труп	actor	
1929	Adventures of Munchausen (animation)	Похождения Мюнхгаузена	actor	cameo
1930/1935	St. Jorgen's Day	Праздник святого Йоргена	camera assistant/co-director	
1931	The Thaw	Ледолом	assistant director	
1932	The House of the Dead	Мёртвый дом	assistant director	
1932	Horizon	Горизонт	actor	Dan
1934	Marionettes	Марионетки	co-director	
1936	About Oddities of Love	О странностях любви	co-director	
1937	Youth	Юность	consultant	
1940	Salavat Yulayev	Салават Юлаев	second unit director	
1956	Automatic Workshop (documentary)	Цех-автомат	director	
19??	Toys	Игрушки	co-director	
