= The Death Ray (1925 film) =

1925 film

- Directed by: Lev Kuleshov
- Written by: Vsevolod Pudovkin
- Starring: Porfiri Podobed; Vsevolod Pudovkin; Vladimir Fogel; Aleksandra Khokhlova; Leonid Obolensky
- Cinematography: Aleksandr Levitsky
- Production company: Goskino
- Release date: 1925
- Running time: 125 minutes
- Country: Soviet Union
- Language: Silent film

The Death Ray (Russian: Луч смерти, romanized: Luch smerti) is a 1925 Soviet science fiction film directed by Lev Kuleshov. The first and last reels of the film have been lost. This film ran at 2 hours, 5 minutes, making this one of the earliest full length science fiction films. Despite the fact that many sources claim the inspiration for the film to be the novel The Garin Death Ray by Aleksei Tolstoy, this is not the case. It is impossible, since the book was published two years after the film, in 1927. Furthermore, the film has many similarities with a book by Valentin Kataev, called Lord of Iron, published in 1924. Moreover, the theme of death rays was very popular at the time because of the 1923 claim of British inventor Harry Grindell Matthews to have created a "death ray".

== Plot ==
The film takes place in an unspecified Western capitalist country where a fascist government is attempting to suppress a socialist uprising. The revolutionary leader Thomas Lamm is imprisoned by the government but he escapes to the Soviet Union. There he meets the engineer Podobed who invents the "death ray" – a device which explodes gunpowder and fuel mixtures at a distance.

Father Revo, a fascist intelligence agent, steals the invention and brings it back to his country. The government begins using it as an instrument for suppressing labor strikes. However, the workers end up seizing the device and use it to blow up bombers in the air which are sent against them.

== Reception ==
The film received negative reviews on its release and did not do well at the box-office. Kuleshov explained the film's failure as the result of its experimental nature and that the main goal of the picture was to merely display that the director was capable of making professional films at a low budget.

== Cast ==
- Porfiri Podobed as Engineer Podobed
- Vsevolod Pudovkin as Father Revo
- Vladimir Fogel as Fascist Fog
- Aleksandra Khokhlova as Sister Edith and Female Shooter
- Leonid Obolensky as Mayor Hard, Boss of the Fascists
- Sergei Komarov as Thomas Lann
- Andrei Fajt as agent
- Mikhail Doller
- Lev Kuleshov

== See also ==
- 1925 in science fiction
