= Your Acquaintance =

1927 film

- Directed by: Lev Kuleshov
- Written by: Aleksandr Kurs
- Cinematography: Konstantin Kuznetsov
- Edited by: Lev Kuleshov
- Production company: Sovkino
- Release date: 25 October 1927
- Country: Soviet Union
- Languages: Silent; Russian intertitles

Your Acquaintance (Russian: Ваша знакомая, romanized: Vasha znakomaya) is a 1927 Soviet short silent drama film directed by Lev Kuleshov and starring Aleksandra Khokhlova, Pyotr Galadzhev and Yuri Vasilchikov. Only a fragment of the film still survives.

The film's art direction was by Vasili Rakhals and Alexander Rodchenko.

== Plot ==
The film is set in Moscow, during the years of the NEP. Journalist Khokhlova falls in love with Petrovsky, a responsible officer at an industrial plant. This infatuation has a negative impact on her work and the girl is fired. Meanwhile Petrovsky's wife returns. This situation reveals the true nature of the lover who is an egoist and a vulgarian. The girl is near suicide however the tragic denouement is prevented by Vasilchikov who has been in love with the journalist for a long time, a modest editor of the department "Working inventions."

== Cast ==
- Aleksandra Khokhlova as Khokhlova - journalist
- Pyotr Galadzhev as Secretary
- Yuri Vasilchikov as Vasilchikov
- Boris Ferdinandov as Petrovski
- Anna Chekulaeva as Petrovsky's wife
- Aleksandr Gromov as Typographer

== Bibliography ==
- Christie, Ian & Taylor, Richard. The Film Factory: Russian and Soviet Cinema in Documents 1896-1939. Routledge, 2012.
