= Inzhavinsky District =

Inzhavinsky District Инжавинский район (Russian)
- District
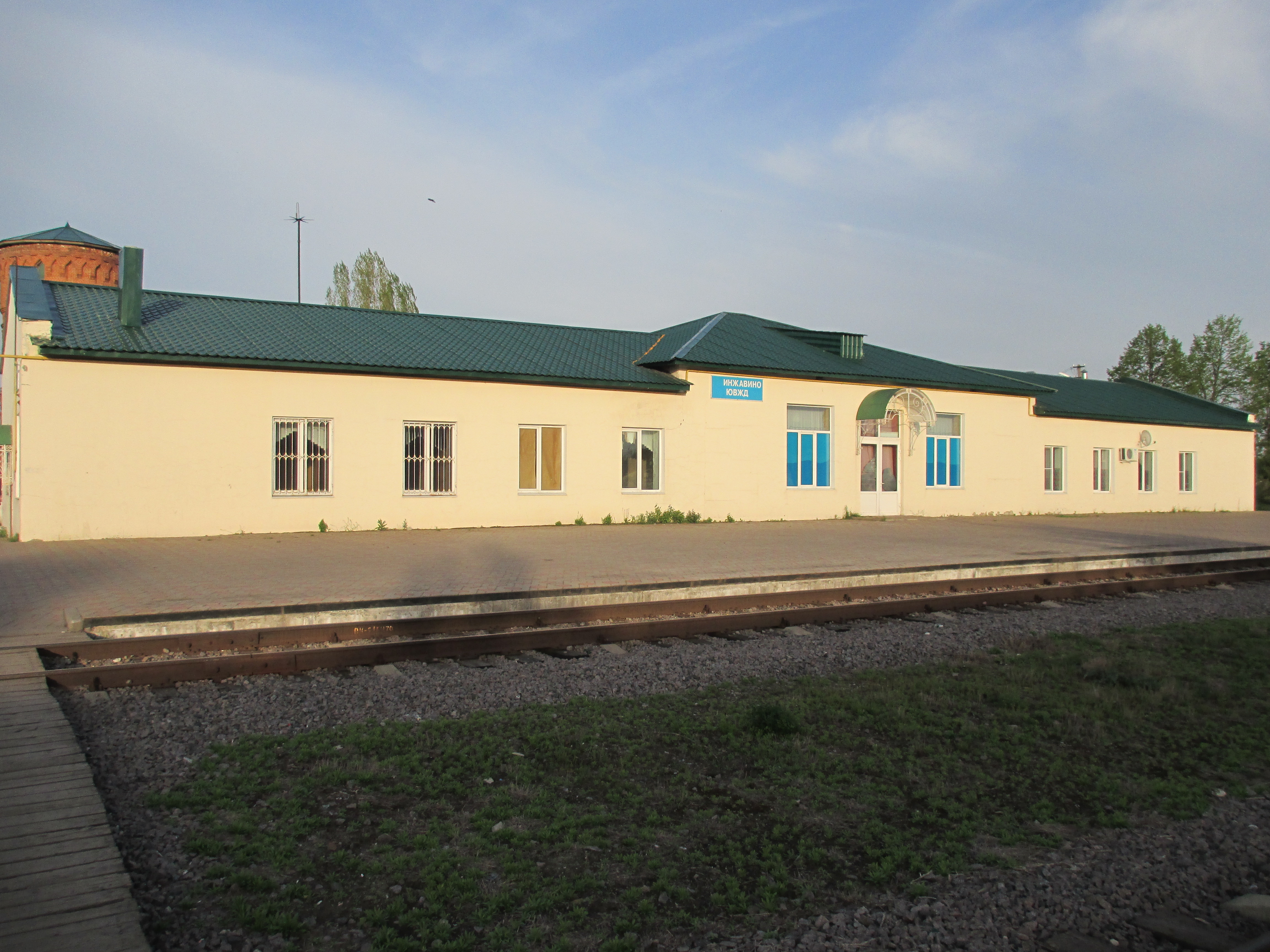
- Train station in Inzhavino, Inzhavinsky District

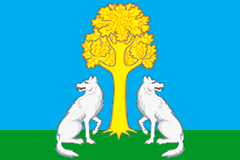
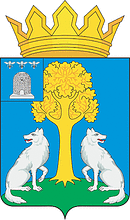
- Flag Coat of arms
- Location of Inzhavinsky District in Tambov Oblast
- Coordinates: 52°19′N 42°30′E
- Country: Russia
- Federal subject: Tambov Oblast
- Established: 1928
- Administrative center: Inzhavino

Area
  - Total: 1,830 km^{2} (710 sq mi)

Population (2010 Census)
  - Total: 23,184
  - Density: 12.7/km^{2} (32.8/sq mi)
  - Urban: 41.4%
  - Rural: 58.6%

Administrative structure
  - Administrative divisions: 1 Settlement councils, 13 Selsoviets
  - Inhabited localities: 1 urban-type settlements, 98 rural localities

Municipal structure
  - Municipally incorporated as: Inzhavinsky Municipal District
  - Municipal divisions: 1 urban settlements, 13 rural settlements
- Time zone: UTC+3 (MSK)
- OKTMO ID: 68608000
- Website: http://r53.tambov.gov.ru/

Inzhavinsky District (Russian: Инжа́винский райо́н) is an administrative and municipal district (raion), one of the twenty-three in Tambov Oblast, Russia. It is located in the east of the oblast. The district borders with Kirsanovsky District in the north, Turkovsky District of Saratov Oblast in the east, Uvarovsky District in the south, and with Rzhaksinsky District in the west. The area of the district is 1,830 square kilometers (710 sq mi). Its administrative center is the urban locality (a work settlement) of Inzhavino. Population: 23,184 (2010 Census); 27,843 (2002 census); 33,964 (1989 Soviet census). The population of Inzhavino accounts for 41.4% of the district's total population.

== People ==
- Nikolay Annenkov (1899-1999)
