= Neurocinema =

Study of the effects of movies on the brain

Neurocinema, or neurocinematics, is the study of how watching movies, or particular scenes from movies, impacts the nervous system. By measuring the response in the human brain to any given movie or scene, neuroscientists can examine what areas are activated across subjects.

== History ==
Although these studies began in the 2000s, this idea has been around since the early years of film. This is demonstrated with Sergei Eisenstein's experiments with montage theory and Lev Kuleshov's famous “Kuleshov Effect”. These Russian filmmakers studied American filmmakers such as D.W. Griffith and discovered that film was a “malleable” art. The Kuleshov Effect proved that the juxtaposition of a series of images together can create ideas and emotions in an audience's mind. This revolutionized propaganda in the Soviet Union to spread the influence and collective strength of a new revolutionary Marxist state after the revolution of 1917.

This idea has grown ever since. Alfred Hitchcock referred to this idea of film saying, “[Film] creation is based on an exact science of audience reactions”. He said this long before MRI technology was even fathomable. In more recent years marketing agencies have had their foot in the door with these studies in terms of neuromarketing. They use “fMRI, EEG, galvanic skin response, eye-tracking and other biometric approaches” to screen trailers to show studios and production companies how to best market a film for distribution.

== Science ==
These studies are conducted with viewers’ laying on their backs with a mirror above them. Movies are projected onto those mirrors and sound is transmitted by the subjects wearing high-fidelity MRI compatible headphones. As the viewers’ watch these films they are being monitored in fMRI machines that map the brains activity. When the studies are conducted the participants are told they can look where ever they please, which is referred to as “free-viewing”, and they were told they could stop the study at any point. All the participants in the study had similar eye movement and stimulation in areas of the brain when shown certain movies, scenes or clips of video regardless of the “free-viewing” method that was in place. This was documented by a new method of “Inter-Subject Correlation” in which they mapped the brain activity of the participants and aligned them over the same timeline.
