= Alisher Navoi (film) =

- Russian: Алишер Навои
- Directed by: Kamil Yarmatov
- Written by: Viktor Shklovskiy; Aleksei Speshnyov; Izzat Sultanov; Uygun
- Starring: Razzoq Hamroyev; Asad Ismatov; Abid Dshalilov
- Cinematography: Mikhail Krasnyansky
- Music by: Reinhold Glière; Talib Sadykov
- Production company: Uzbekfilm
- Release date: 1947
- Running time: 100 min.
- Country: Soviet Union
- Language: Russian

Alisher Navoi (Russian: Алишер Навои) is a 1947 Soviet drama film directed by Kamil Yarmatov about the life of the famous poet and statesman Alisher Navoi.

== Plot ==
Prince Husayn Bayqara, heir to the fragmented empire of Timur, and poet Alisher Navoi share a close bond from their school days. After Husayn ascends to the throne, Alisher assists him in governing the state, much like Aristotle guiding Alexander the Great. Following a period of successful wars, peace prevails, and Alisher takes on the role of tutor to Husayn’s grandson.

The tranquility is soon shattered when Prince Yadgar Muhammad Mirza, a relative of the sultan, invades, destroying a dam and depriving peasants of water. Before the battle, Vizier Majaveddin betrays the sultan, but Alisher devises a strategy that leads to victory. When Husayn confronts Yadgar, he spares his life. However, Yadgar later seizes the Herat fortress. Husayn hesitates to deploy the army, influenced by the vizier’s advice. Alisher secretly infiltrates the fortress with loyal allies, including stonemason Jalaleddin, Mansur (the vizier's son), and cook Abul-Malik. They capture Yadgar, intending to bring him to Husayn to expose the traitor. Yadgar, however, manipulates Mansur by warning of his father’s execution, prompting Mansur to kill Yadgar to protect the secret. Alisher assumes responsibility for Yadgar’s death and delivers his head to Husayn. The sultan appoints Alisher as chief emir and Mansur as tax collector in Herat.

In Herat, peasants and artisans revolt, refusing to pay taxes and barricading themselves in the city. Initially, Husayn plans to use force but instead sends Alisher to mediate. Alisher enters the city, where the people reveal their suffering due to unfair water distribution favoring the bey. Mansur is deemed guilty and executed, and the city surrenders. However, the beks demand Alisher’s removal. To persuade the sultan, they gift him a woman named Guli. Alisher, in love with Guli, asks Husayn to let her go with him. During their journey, Guli dies from poison administered by the vizier.

Alisher retreats into solitude and, in his old age, returns to court. The vizier deceives and kills Husayn’s grandson. In the end, Alisher and Husayn meet one final time before parting forever.

== Cast ==
- Razzoq Hamroyev as Alisher Navoi
- Asad Ismatov as Sultan Husayn Mirza Bayqara
- Abid Dshalilov as Majdeddin
- Tamara Nazarova as Guli
- Saat Talipov as Yadygar
- Rakhim Pirmukhamedov as Abul-Malik
- Lutfulla Nazrullaev as Jelaleddin
