= Cosmic Voyage =

Cosmic Voyage may refer to:

- Cosmic Voyage (1996 film), a short documentary film
- Cosmic Voyage (1936 film), a Soviet science fiction silent film
