= Komil Yormatov =

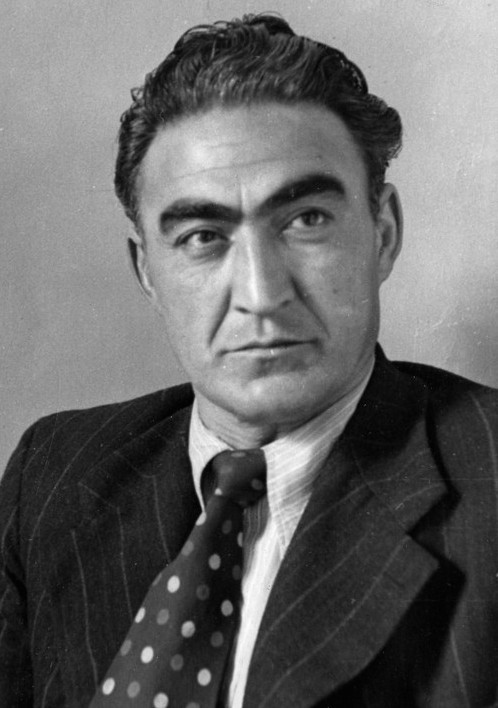
Komil Yormatov

Komil Yormatov (Tajik: Комил Ёрматов; 2 May 1903 in Konibodom – 17 November 1978 in Moscow) was a prominent actor and director in the cinema of Tajikistan during the Soviet era. He later moved to Uzbekistan and then to Moscow.

== Biography ==
A member since his juvenile years of the Communist Party of the Soviet Union, he went to Moscow to study under Valentin Turkin at the Moscow Film School, where he graduated in 1931. Before graduation, he had already starred in the Soviet propaganda movies The Jackals of Ravat (1927), From the Arch of the Mosque (1928), both directed by Kasimir Gertel (1889–1938), and The Last Bek (1930).

After graduating in Moscow, Yormatov went back to his native Tajikistan to help with the newly established state cinema company Tajikkino, where he started his directing career. In 1932, Yormatov directed Honored Right and On the Faraway Frontier. Both were Soviet patriotic documentaries, the first about the mobilization of Tajiks in the Soviet army, and the second describing the life of border guards at the Afghan frontier.

In 1934, Yormatov both directed and starred as the leading actor in the first full-length feature film produced in Tajikistan, Emigrant. The script had been written by the Armenian poet Gabriel El-Registan and the film was approved by the authorities for distribution throughout the Soviet Union, as it argued that Tajiks who remained in Socialist Tajikistan had a better life than those who emigrated from the Soviet Union. It was one of the last Soviet silent movies.

In 1934, leading Russian director Lev Kuleshov was sent to Tajikistan to improve the quality of local movies. He worked for two years at a movie based on the novel Dokhunda by Tajik national poet Sadriddin Ayni, starring Yormatov, but the project was regarded with suspicion by the authorities as possibly exciting Tajik nationalism, and stopped. No footage survives.

In 1939, Tajikkino produced Friends Meet Again by Yormatov, which exalted economic progress under Joseph Stalin but also denounced infiltration by foreign spies, a typical Stalinist theme. In 1940, Yormatov moved to Uzbekistan, where producing films was easier than in Tajikistan, and then to Russia. In 1947, he directed Alisher Navoi, on the life of poet, politician, and mystic Ali-Shir Nava'i. The movie won the Stalin Prize and consecrated Yormatov as a nationally famous patriotic Soviet director. When he visited Vietnam in 1957, the local vice-minister of culture told him that Alisher Navoi was one of the first Soviet movies screened for the guerrilla fighters during the First Indochina War.

In 1952, Yormatov directed Pakhta-oi, a patriotic film for children about the production of cotton, and in 1957 achieved again national success in the Soviet Union with Avicenna, a film on the life of Ibn Sina. His later movies were less successful, as a new generation of Soviet filmmakers was moving away from the patriotic tunes typical of Yormatov, but he assumed a semi-official role as an ambassador of Soviet cinema throughout the world, until his death in Moscow on 17 November 1978.

In 2013, Tajik director Safarnek Soliev Kamil directed a documentary celebrating the 110th anniversary of the birth of Yormatov. It was selected to open the 2014 Didor International Film Festival in Dushanbe, the most important film festival in Tajikistan.

== Awards ==
- Hero of Socialist Labor (28 April 1973)
- People's Artist of the USSR (18 March 1959)
- People's Artist of the Uzbek SSR (23 February 1955)
- Three Order of Lenin (4 November 1967, 22 June 1971, 28 April 1973)
- Order of the Red Banner of Labor (13 May 1964)
- Two Order of the Badge of Honor (23 May 1940 and 16 January 1950)
- Stalin Prize 2nd class (1948)
- State Hamza Prize (1967)
