= Kuleshov effect =

Concept in film editing

Example clip of a modern Kuleshov sequence, where footage of a man's face is intercut with three different shots

The Kuleshov effect (Russian: Эффект Кулешова) is a film editing (montage) effect demonstrated by Russian filmmaker Lev Kuleshov in the 1910s and 1920s. It is a cognitive phenomenon by which viewers derive more meaning from the interaction of two sequential shots than from a single shot in isolation. Prior to the 1960s, the phenomenon was sometimes known as the Pudovkin effect and the Mozzhukhin experiment.

== Kuleshov's experiment ==
When, where, and how Lev Kuleshov created this later cinematic research is not precisely known. He, like his collaborator Vsevolod Pudovkin, recounted differing versions, beginning soon after the work was done. No film or photo documentation is known to survive (if any edited film was ever created at all). Kuleshov edited a short film in which a shot of the expressionless face of Tsarist-era movie star Ivan Mozzhukhin (later known by the French name Ivan Mosjoukine) was alternated with various other shots (a bowl of soup, a girl in a coffin, a woman on a divan). The film was shown to an audience who believed that the expression on Mosjoukine's face was different each time he appeared, depending on whether he was "looking at" the bowl of soup, the girl in the coffin, or the woman on the divan, showing an expression of hunger, grief, or desire, respectively. The footage of Mosjoukine was actually the same shot each time. Vsevolod Pudovkin (who later claimed to have been the co-creator of the experiment) described in 1929 how the audience "raved about the acting ... the heavy pensiveness of his mood over the forgotten soup, were touched and moved by the deep sorrow with which he looked on the dead child, and noted the lust with which he observed the woman. But we knew that in all three cases the face was exactly the same."

Kuleshov used the experiment to indicate the usefulness and effectiveness of film editing. The implication is that viewers brought their own emotional reactions to this sequence of images, and then moreover attributed those reactions to the actor, investing his impassive face with their own feelings. Kuleshov believed this, along with montage, had to be the basis of cinema as an independent art form.

The experiment itself was created by assembling fragments of pre-existing film from the Tsarist film industry, with no new material. Mosjoukine had been the leading romantic "star" of Tsarist cinema, and familiar to the audience.

== Impact ==
Kuleshov demonstrated the necessity of considering montage as the basic tool of cinema. In Kuleshov's view, the cinema consists of fragments and the assembly of those fragments, the assembly of elements which in reality are distinct. It is therefore not the content of the images in a film which is important, but their combination. The raw materials of such an art work need not be original, but are prefabricated elements which can be disassembled and reassembled by the artist into new juxtapositions.

The montage experiments carried out by Kuleshov in the late 1910s and early 1920s formed the theoretical basis of Soviet montage cinema, culminating in the famous films of the late 1920s by directors such as Sergei Eisenstein, Vsevolod Pudovkin and Dziga Vertov, among others. These films included The Battleship Potemkin, October, Mother, The End of St. Petersburg, and The Man with a Movie Camera.

The effect has also been studied by psychologists and is well known among modern film-makers. Alfred Hitchcock refers to the effect in his conversations with François Truffaut, using actor James Stewart as the example. In the famous "Definition of Happiness" interview which was part of the CBC Telescope program, Hitchcock also explained in detail many types of editing to Fletcher Markle. The final form, which he calls "pure editing", is explained visually using the Kuleshov effect. In the first version of the example, Hitchcock is squinting, and the audience sees footage of a woman with a baby. The screen then returns to Hitchcock's face, now smiling. In effect, he is a kind old man. In the second example, the woman and baby are replaced with a woman in a bikini, Hitchcock explains: "What is he now? He's a dirty old man."

== Research ==
The Kuleshov effect has been studied by psychologists only in recent years. Prince and Hensley (1992) recreated the original study design but did not find the alleged effect. The study had 137 participants but was a single-trial between-subject experiment, which is prone to noise in the data. Dean Mobbs et al. did a within-subject fMRI study in 2006 and found an effect for negative, positive, or neutral valence. When a neutral face was shown behind a sad scene, it seemed sad; when it was shown behind a happy scene, it seemed happy. In 2016, Daniel Barratt et al. tested 36 participants using 24 film sequences across five emotional conditions (happiness, sadness, hunger, fear, and desire) and a neutral control condition. Again, they showed that neutral faces were rated in accordance with the stimuli material, confirming the 2006 findings of Mobbs et al.

Thus, despite the initial problems in testing the Kuleshov effect experimentally, researchers now agree that the context in which a face is shown has a significant effect on how the face is perceived.

To find out whether the Kuleshov effect can also be induced auditorily, Andreas M. Baranowski and Heiko Hecht intercut different clips of faces with neutral scenes, featuring happy music, sad music, or no music at all. They found that the music significantly influenced participants’ emotional judgments of facial expression.

== See also ==
- Creative geography was another Kuleshov experiment demonstrating the usefulness of montage.
- Neurocinema
- Uncanny valley
- Hysteresis
