= Dzhulbars =

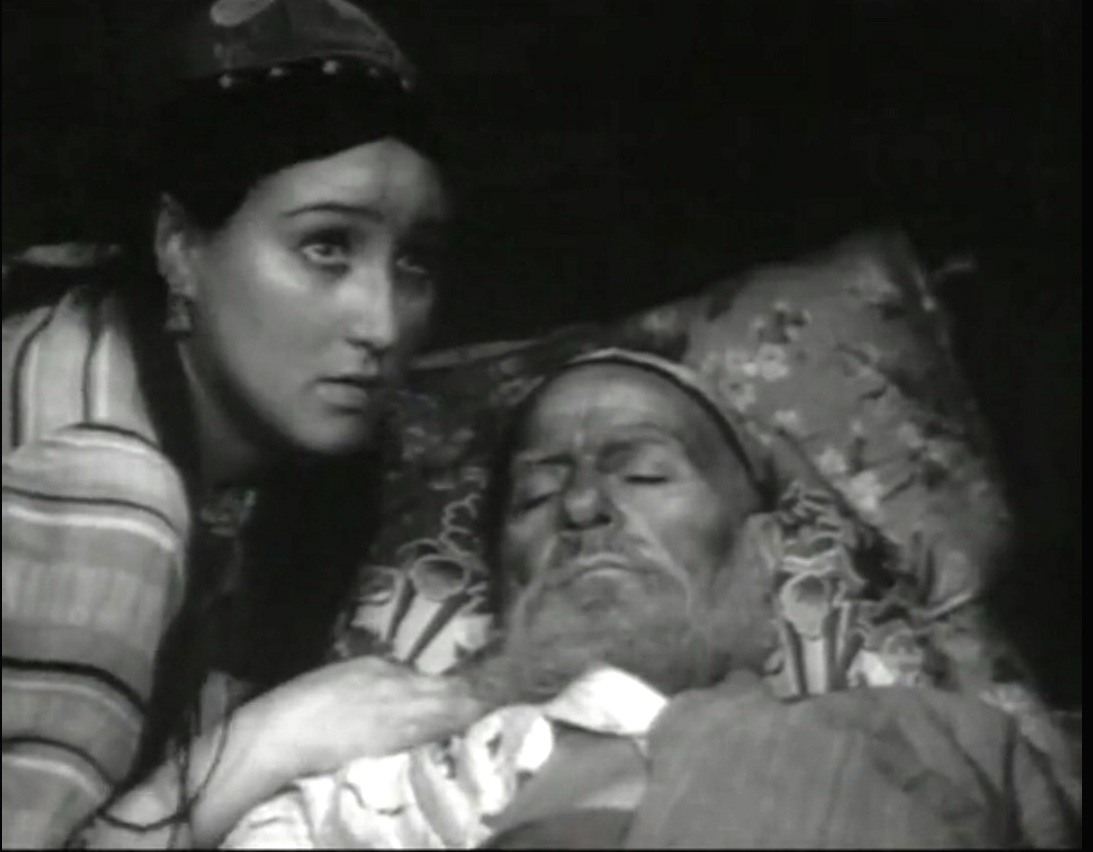
- A scene in Dzhulbars
- Russian: Джульбарс
- Directed by: Vladimir Schneiderov
- Written by: Vladimir Schneiderov; Gabriel Ureklyan
- Starring: Nikolay Cherkasov-Sergeyev; Natalya Gitserot; Nikolay Makarenko; Ivan Bobrov; Andrey Fayt; N.P. Teleshov
- Cinematography: Aleksandr Shelenkov
- Release date: 1935
- Country: Soviet Union
- Language: Russian

Dzhulbars (Russian: Джульбарс) is a 1935 Soviet action film directed by Vladimir Schneiderov.

== Plot ==
The basmachi organize an attack on a peaceful caravan heading to mountain villages, and take prisoners the old guide Sho-Murad along with his granddaughter Peri. Border guards with sheepdog Julbars fight to save the captives.

== Cast ==
- Nikolay Cherkasov-Sergeyev as Sho-Murad (as N.P. Cherkasov)
- Natalya Gitserot as Peri (as Natasha Gitserot)
- Nikolai Makarenko as Tkachenko (as N.N. Makarenko)
- Ivan Bobrov as Abdullo (as I.V. Bobrov)
- Andrey Fayt as Kerim (as A.A. Fajt)
- N.P. Teleshov as Beggar
