= The Doll with Millions =

1928 film

- Directed by: Sergei Komarov
- Written by: Oleg Leonidov; Fedor Ozep
- Starring: Igor Ilyinsky
- Cinematography: Konstantin Kuznetsov
- Production company: Mezhrabpom-Russ
- Release date: 25 December 1928
- Running time: 67 minutes
- Country: Soviet Union
- Language: Silent film (Russian intertitles)

The Doll with Millions (Russian: Кукла с миллионами, romanized: Kukla s millionami) is a 1928 Soviet silent comedy film by Sergei Komarov starring Igor Ilyinsky.

== Plot ==
The Doll with Millions (1928)

In Paris, a millionaire widow Madame Collie has died. Her will leaves all her property to her granddaughter - Maria Ivanova, who lives in Moscow. The girl has also inherited shares of "Trippoli Channel" worth millions hidden in a doll. Pierre and Paul Cuisinai, who believe that they have been unfairly left out of the will, set off to Moscow to find Maria and propose to her in order to earn a fortune.

== Cast ==
- Igor Ilyinsky as Paul Cuisinai
- Vladimir Fogel as Pierre Cuisinai
- Galina Kravchenko as Blanche
- Ada Vojtsik as Maria Ivanova
- Vladimir Chuvelyov
- Aleksandr Gromov
- Sergey Komarov
- Pavel Poltoratskiy

== Bibliography ==
- Christie, Ian & Taylor, Richard. The Film Factory: Russian and Soviet Cinema in Documents 1896-1939. Routledge, 2012.
