= Horizon (1932 film) =

1932 film

- Russian: Горизонт
- Directed by: Lev Kuleshov
- Written by: Lev Kuleshov; Georgi Munblit; Viktor Shklovsky
- Produced by: F. Akimov; N. Alekseev; A. Kapustyansky
- Starring: Nikolai Batalov; Dmitriy Kara-Dmitriev; Sergey Komarov; Yelena Kuzmina; Andrei Gorchilin
- Cinematography: Konstantin Kuznetsov
- Edited by: Ksenia Blinova; K. Skomorovskaya
- Production company: Mezhrabpomfilm
- Release date: November 10, 1932
- Country: Soviet Union
- Language: Russian

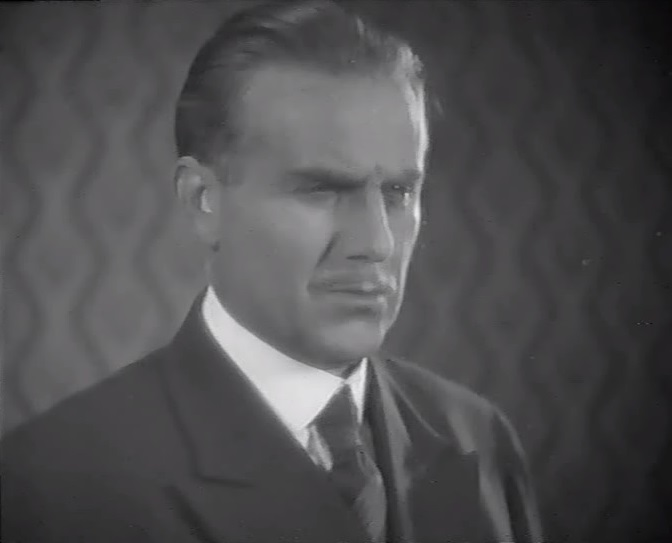
Michail Doller in Horizon

Horizon (Russian: Горизонт, romanized: Gorizont) is a 1932 Soviet film directed by Lev Kuleshov.

== Plot ==
The film tells about the Jew Lev Horizon, who emigrated to the United States. There he joined the ranks of the army, went to Russia and transferred to the side of the Soviet army.

== Cast ==
- Nikolai Batalov as Lev Abramovich Horizon
- Dmitriy Kara-Dmitriev as The Watchmaker
- Nikolai Gladkov as Kid
- Andrei Gorchilin as Monya
- Sergey Komarov as Subofficer / American policeman / Priest
- Yelena Kuzmina as Rose, Isaak's Daughter
- Mikhail Doronin as Isaak Horizon, Lev's Uncle
- Mikhail Doller as Smith
- Konstantin Khokhlov as Manufacturer
- Nikolai Kryuchkov as partisan
- Andrei Fajt as officer
- Ye. Sheremetyeva as First Girl
