= Siberians (film) =

- Russian: Сибиряки
- Directed by: Lev Kuleshov
- Written by: Aleksandr Vitenzon
- Produced by: O. Kolodny
- Starring: Aleksandra Kharitonova; Aleksandr Kuznetsov; Aleksandr Pupko; Mariya Vinogradova; Daniil Sagal
- Cinematography: Mikhail Kirillov
- Music by: Zinovi Feldman
- Release date: 1940
- Country: Soviet Union
- Language: Russian

Siberians (Russian: Сибиряки) is a 1940 Soviet adventure drama film directed by Lev Kuleshov.

== Plot ==
Siberians (1940)

On one New Year the old hunter tells two middle-school students the story of how Stalin presented his tobacco pipe to one hunter for help with his escape from exile. According to legend, the hunter died during the Civil War, and the pipe remained with his friend. The guys are interested in this story and they decide to find this pipe.

== Cast ==
- Aleksandra Kharitonova as Valia
- Aleksandr Kuznetsov as Serezha
- Aleksandr Pupko as Petja
- Mariya Vinogradova as Galka
- Daniil Sagal as Aleksei - hunter and Valia's uncle
- T. Alcheva as Anna Fedorovna
- Georgiy Millyar as Grandfather Jakov
- Aleksandra Khokhlova as Pelagueia
- Andrey Fayt as Dr. Vasili Vasilievich
- Andrei Gorchilin as Kolkhoz' chief
- Sergey Komarov as Terentij
- Dmitriy Orlov as Doshindon
- Mikheil Gelovani as Josef Stalin
