= On the Red Front =

1920 film

- Directed by: Lev Kuleshov
- Written by: Lev Kuleshov
- Cinematography: Pyotr Yermolov
- Production company: VGIK
- Release date: 1920
- Country: Russia
- Languages: Silent; Russian intertitles

On the Red Front (Russian: На красном фронте, romanized: Na krasnom fronte) is a 1920 Soviet silent war drama film directed by Lev Kuleshov.

== Plot ==
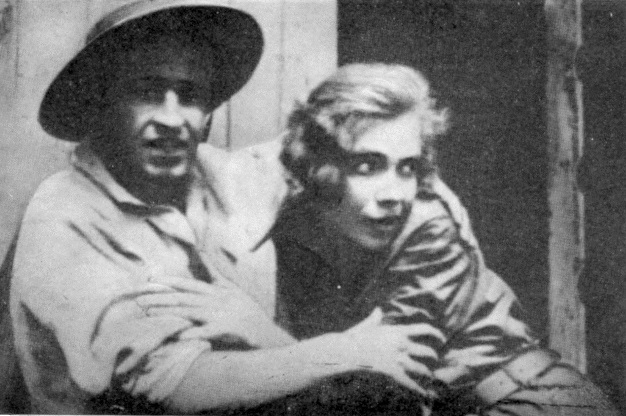
Still from the film

During the Russian Civil War, the commander of a Red Army unit entrusts a courier with a secret report to deliver to headquarters. Along the way, a Polish spy ambushes the courier, steals the confidential document, and attempts to escape.

Undeterred, the Red Army soldier pursues the spy, with the help of a passing vehicle that allows him to catch up to a train where the spy has taken refuge. The two engage in a dramatic fight atop the roof of a railway carriage. After a fierce struggle, the Red Army courier defeats his opponent and successfully delivers the critical dispatch to headquarters.

== Cast ==
- Aleksandra Khokhlova as Polish peasant
- Lev Kuleshov as Polish Peasant
- Leonid Obolensky as Red Army soldier
- A. Reikh as Polish spy

== Bibliography ==
- Christie, Ian & Taylor, Richard. The Film Factory: Russian and Soviet Cinema in Documents 1896-1939. Routledge, 2012.
