= Galina Kravchenko =

Soviet actress (1905–1996)

- Born: Galina Sergeevna Kravchenko; 11 February 1905; Kazan, Russian Empire
- Died: 5 March 1996 (aged 91); Moscow, Russia
- Occupation: Actress
- Years active: 1924-1971

Galina Sergeevna Kravchenko (Russian: Галина Сергеевна Кравченко; 11 February 1905 – 5 March 1996) was a Soviet actress.

== Biography ==
Galina Kravchenko was born on 11 February 1905 in Kazan, Russian Empire (now Kazan, Tatarstan, Russia). After the Russian revolution of 1917, she moved to Moscow; there her mother worked in the Soviet Government. In 1923, in her mother's Moscow office young Kravchenko met Vsevolod Pudovkin, who was very impressed with her natural beauty and talent, and recommended her to the acting school at State Institute of Cinema (VGIK). From 1924 - 26 she studied acting under Vladimir Gardin, graduating as actress. During the 1920s and 1930s Kravchenko was a staff actress with Mezhrabpom Film Studio. She enjoyed a stellar career in Soviet silent films.

Kravchenko was married to popular actor Andrei Fajt, and the couple was part of Moscow cultural milieu during the 1920s and early 1930s. During the 1930s she was married to the son of the powerful Soviet leader, Lev Kamenev, who was a political opponent of Joseph Stalin. After the party leader Sergey Kirov was assassinated on 1 December 1934, Kamenev was secretly tried and sentenced, on false accusations for having contributed to the crime. In August 1936, however, Kamenev and Zinovyev were tried again in the first public-show trial of the Great Purge. Accused of conspiring to assassinate Stalin and other Soviet leaders, Kamenev was brutally pressured and eventually confessed to the fabricated charges in the vain hope of saving his family. He was shot, and his wife perished in the Gulag. Five decades later, Lev Kamenev was cleared of charges by the Soviet Supreme Court in 1988. Kravchenko suffered a blow to her acting career and personal life. She was censored under the dictatorship of Joseph Stalin, and was practically unemployed for more than 20 years. After the death of Stalin, Kravchenko returned to Moscow and struggled to survive until the late 1950s, when Nikita Khrushchev initiated the "Thaw" in cultural life in the Soviet Union. At that time, Kravchenko was an almost forgotten aging actress, and her career was limited to playing bit parts as mothers and grandmothers in low-budget Soviet films.

Kravchenko made a comeback as Maria Lvovna Kuragina, the omnipresent socialite in War and Peace (1967) by director Sergei Bondarchuk. At that time, Bondarchuk was not a member of the Soviet Communist party, so he was dare to cast many actors who were previously censored under Stalin, including Kravchenko. She later wrote a book of memoirs describing her joy of working with Bondarchuk in War and Peace.

Kravchenko was designated Honorable Actress of Russia in 1980. Both her late husband and her father-in-law, Lev Kamenev, were posthumously cleared of all charges during Mikhail Gorbachev's reforms.

Kravchenko died on 5 March 1996 in Moscow.

== Selected filmography ==
- Knysh's Gang (1924) as episode
- Aelita (1924) as cameo (uncredited)
- The Cigarette Girl from Mosselprom (1924) as actress
- The Marriage of the Bear (1925) as episode (uncredited)
- Tale of the Woods (1926) as Wanda
- Kukla s millionami (1928) as Blanche
- Bulat-Batır (1928) as Elena von Brandt
- The Happy Canary (1929) as Brio
- Zhit (1933) as The Actress
- The Great Consoler (1933) as Annabel Adams
- A Girl with a Temper (1939) as mother of a lost child
- Suvorov (1941) as Lopukhina (uncredited)
- War and Peace (1967) as Maria Lvovna Kuragina
- Express on Fire (1981) as passenger with dog
- Anna Pavlova (1983) as episode
- Mother Mary (1983) as episode
