= The Yellow Ticket (1928 film) =

1928 film

- Directed by: Fyodor Otsep
- Written by: Fyodor Otsep
- Starring: Anna Sten; Ivan Koval-Samborsky; Mikhail Narokov
- Cinematography: Louis Forestier
- Production company: Mezhrabpomfilm
- Release date: 7 February 1928
- Running time: 80 minutes
- Country: Soviet Union
- Languages: Silent; Russian intertitles

The Yellow Ticket or Earth in Captivity (Russian: Земля в плену, romanized: Zemlya v plenu) is a 1928 Soviet silent drama film written and directed by Fyodor Otsep and starring Anna Sten, Ivan Koval-Samborsky and Mikhail Narokov.

== Plot ==
Retired soldier Yakov Koval returns to his village to his wife Maria and their daughter after long military service in the tsarist army. The family unsuccessfully tries to survive as tenant farmers, since the plot of land leased to them by the landowner Belskiy is stony and infertile.

In order to prevent their property, which has been seized due to unpaid debt, from being sold at auction, Maria agrees to work in the city household of the landowner Belsky as a wet nurse. Employers exploit Maria's illiteracy and naivety for their own gain. The landowner Belsky's daughter — woman whose child she is nursing — completely alters the contents of Yakov's desperate letters, and the drunken Baron's son-in-law sexually assaults Maria.

Maria works under the delusion that her wages are keeping her family afloat. She has no idea they are homeless until Yakov and their daughter finally appear at the doorstep, exhausted and broken. Seeing Maria all dressed up and carefree, Yakov believes the butler's words that she has become a concubine for the Baron's son-in-law and forgotten about her family as they never received any news or money from her. Angry and devastated, he tells her that their toddler has died — he pushes her away and leaves with their daughter.

Due to stress, Maria's milk dries up, and she is promptly fired and kicked out to the streets. Caught in a police raid, she is mistaken for a prostitute and issued the infamous "yellow ticket". With such a document in hand, she cannot get an honest job. Her descent becomes a reality as she eventually turns to prostitution to survive. It is within a brothel that she learns of Yakov’s fate from client: he has been crippled in a workplace accident and can no longer work. She goes to find her husband and their daughter, and in their reunion, they both find the strength to strive for a new beginning.

== Cast ==
- Anna Sten as Maria, young farmer's wife
- Ivan Koval-Samborsky as Jacob
- Mikhail Narokov as Belskiy
- Vladimir Fogel as Baron's son-in-law
- Anel Sudakevich as Anya – Baron's married daughter
- Sofya Yakovleva as Katarina
- Pyotr Baksheyev as Doorman, butler
- Nikolai Batalov as Maria's fellow villager
- Ivan Chuvelyov
- Konstantin Gradopolov
- Sofya Levitina
- Vera Maretskaya as Prostitute
- Porfiri Podobed

== Bibliography ==
- Phillips, Alastair & Vincendeau, Ginette. Journeys of Desire: European Actors in Hollywood. British Film Institute, 2006.
