= By the Law =

1926 film

- Directed by: Lev Kuleshov
- Screenplay by: Viktor Shklovsky; Lev Kuleshov
- Based on: "The Unexpected" (1905) and "Just Meat" (1906) by Jack London
- Starring: Aleksandra Khokhlova; Sergei Komarov; Vladimir Fogel
- Cinematography: Konstantin Kuznetsov
- Production company: Goskino
- Release date: 3 December 1926
- Country: Soviet Union
- Language: Silent film

By the Law (Russian: По закону, romanized: Po Zakonu) is an 83-minute silent action drama film released on 3 December 1926. The film was directed by Lev Kuleshov and produced by the Soviet production company Goskino.

The narrative is based on the short story "The Unexpected" (1905) by Jack London. The plot concerns a group of gold prospectors in the Yukon region of Canada during the Klondike Gold Rush.

== Plot ==
A five-person gold mining expedition originally from Western Europe finds a large deposit in the Yukon during the Klondike Gold Rush. The group is composed of Michael (Irish), Hans Nelson (Swede and leader of the expedition) and his wife Edith (English), Dutchy (Dutch) and Harky.

Michael, the one who handles all the manual work and found gold for the group, gets frustrated as the other members still treat him as a subaltern. One day, Michael enters the cabin with a rifle for hunting or protection and, in a moment of madness, shoots dead Dutchy and Harky. The remaining two, Hans Nelson and his wife Edith, disarm him. Hans Nelson wants to kill Michael, but his wife Edith opposes the idea. They face the dilemma of whether to administer justice themselves or risk waiting for the thaw and then trying to return to civilization to render the offender to the public court.

== Cast ==
- Aleksandra Khokhlova as Edith Nelson
- Sergei Komarov as Hans Nelson
- Vladimir Fogel as Michael Dennin
- Pyotr Galadzhev as Harkey
- Porfiri Podobed as Dutchy
- Fred Forell as Jack

== Production ==
After trying his filmmaking skills in different genres, Lev Kuleshov decided to make a film using minimal resources and a strictly limited number of actors ("chamber film"). After reading the Jack London short story "The Unexpected" and "The Meat", he wrote a script with Viktor Shklovsky based on the narrative.

Kuleshov and co-screenwriter Shklovsky initially thought that the studio would be interested in a low-budget feature with three actors in one setting but the script was rejected and only after an article appeared in support of the picture in the magazine "Soviet Screen" was the film greenlit.

For the role of Edith Nelson Lev Kuleshov cast his wife, actress Aleksandra Khokhlova.

The filming was done in the Moscow Oblast, not far from the Tsaritsynsky ponds. The shore of the Moscow River and two trees near the water created the illusion of the wild northern Yukon. On the riverside, a house of prospectors was placed in which the interior scenes were shot.

Shooting conditions were extremely difficult; cold winter scenes were shot in April and inundation occurred. The decoration of the house was flooded, the crew was knee-deep in water and actors often faced electric shocks because of the damaged insulation of the wires.

== Reception ==
The film was received positively abroad in non-English speaking countries; in Anglo regions it was released only in 1939. In Paris, the film was well-received by critics.

In a 2008 survey by Seans magazine, film critic Andrey Shemyakin listed it seventh among his 10 favourite Russian films. The Russian Guild of Film Critics placed By the Law in its list of the 100 best films in the history of Russian cinema.
