= Leonid Obolensky =

Soviet actor (1902–1991)

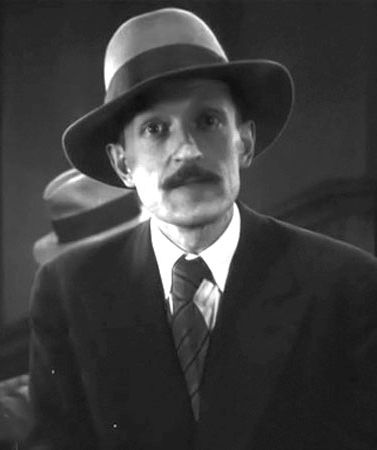
- Born: 21 January 1902; Arzamas, Russian Empire
- Died: 17 November 1991 (aged 89); Miass, Chelyabinsk Oblast, USSR
- Occupation: actor
- Years active: 1919—1991
- Spouse: Irina Obolenskaya

Leonid Leonidovich Obolensky (Russian: Леонид Леонидович Оболенский; 21 January 1902 – 17 November 1991) was a Russian and Soviet actor. Born into the family of the Soviet diplomat Leonid Leonidovich Obolensky (1873−1930) in Arzamas, he studied at the Gerasimov Institute of Cinematography.

== Selected filmography ==
- On the Red Front (1920) as Red Army soldier
- The Extraordinary Adventures of Mr. West in the Land of the Bolsheviks (1924) as dandy
- The Death Ray (1925) as Mayor Hard
- St. Jorgen's Day (1930) as film director
- A Very English Murder (1974) old lord Warbeck
- Walnut Bread (1978) as Andrius's grandfather
- The Casket of Maria Medici (1980) as Bertrand Marti
- Faktas (1981) as Alexandre
