= The Happy Canary =

1929 film

- Directed by: Lev Kuleshov
- Written by: Boris Gusman; Anatoli Marienhof
- Cinematography: Boris Frantsisson; Pyotr Yermolov
- Edited by: Lev Kuleshov
- Production company: Mezhrabpomfilm
- Release date: 5 March 1929
- Running time: 73 minutes
- Country: Soviet Union
- Languages: Silent; Russian intertitles

The Happy Canary or The Gay Canary (Russian: Весёлая канарейка, romanized: Vesyolaya kanareyka) is a 1929 Soviet silent adventure film directed by Lev Kuleshov and starring Galina Kravchenko, Andrey Fayt and Ada Vojtsik.

The film's sets were designed by the art director Sergei Kozlovsky.

== Plot ==
Actress Brio working in a cafe "The Happy Canary", does not suspect that her new acquaintances Brianski and Lugovec are Communists sent by an underground committee to fight the enemy's counter-intelligence ...

== Cast ==
- Galina Kravchenko as Brio
- Andrey Fayt as Lugovec
- Ada Vojtsik as Lugovec' wife
- Sergey Komarov as Brianski
- Yuri Vasilchikov as Assistant Chief Secret Service
- Mikhail Doronin as Chief Secret Service
- Vladimir Kochetov as French communist soldier
- Vsevolod Pudovkin as Illusionist
- Aleksandr Chistyakov as Workman
- N. Kopysov as Workman
- Aleksandr Zhutaev as Workman

== Reception ==
Henri Barbusse described Gay Canary as "an amusing picture of the fever of revels and intrigues which took possession of Odessa during the foreign occupation ten years ago".

== Bibliography ==
- Christie, Ian & Taylor, Richard. The Film Factory: Russian and Soviet Cinema in Documents 1896-1939. Routledge, 2012.
