= Mess-Mend =

1924 Soviet adventure novel

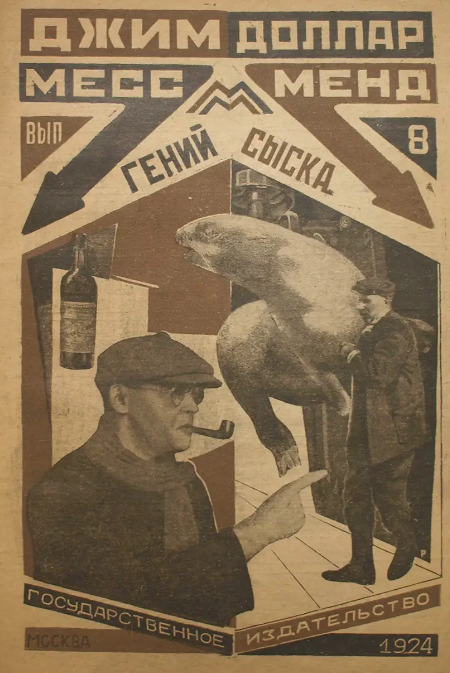
Mess-Mend, issue 8

Mess-Mend: Yankees in Petrograd (Russian: Месс-Менд, или Янки в Петрограде) is a Soviet adventure novel by Marietta Shaginyan with elements of fantasy and mystery. It was first serialized as a pseudotranslation under the pen name Jim Dollar in ten weekly installments published akin to dime novels by Gosizdat during March and April 1924, illustrated by Alexander Rodchenko. The novel is about the struggle of the international clandestine workers' organization Mess-Mend against the international capitalist conspiracy. Its dynamic, entertaining style made it very popular in the Soviet Union.

Mess-Mend had two sequels, also under the pen name Jim Dollar: Lori Len Metallist [Laurie Lane, Metalworker]. Moscow: Gosizdat, 1924; and Месс-Менд, или Международный вагон [Mess-Mend, or International Train Car], first serialized in the evening supplement to Red Newspaper in October-December 2025, later retitled as Doroga v Bagdad [The Road to Baghdad].

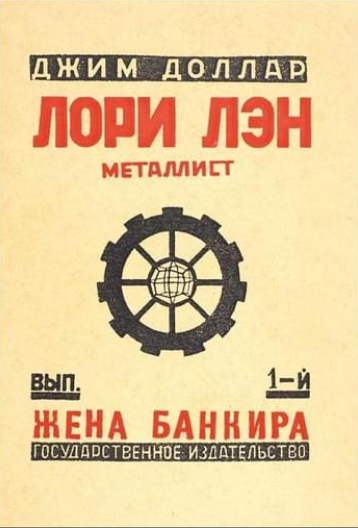
Book cover for Lori Len, issue 1

In 1926, on an occasion of the release of Miss Mend, a Soviet film loosely based on the novel, Shaginyan published a short brochure "How I wrote Mess-Mend".

In 1956 Shaginyan published a reworked version of the book described as "novel-fairytale" in Detgiz publishing house, which included "How I wrote Mess-Mend".

German translation: Mess Mend oder Die Yankees in Leningrad, 1987.

English translation by Samuel Cioran, Ann Arbor: Ardis, 1991.
