= The Great Consoler =

1933 film

The Great Consoler (Великий утешитель)
- Film poster
- Directed by: Lev Kuleshov
- Written by: O. Henry; Lev Kuleshov; Aleksandr Kurs
- Produced by: Ivan Gorchilin
- Starring: Konstantin Khokhlov
- Cinematography: Konstantin Kuznetsov
- Edited by: Lev Kuleshov
- Release date: 1933
- Running time: 95 minutes
- Country: Soviet Union
- Language: Russian

The Great Consoler (Russian: Великий утешитель, translit. Velikiy uteshitel) is a 1933 Soviet drama film directed by Lev Kuleshov and starring Konstantin Khokhlov. The film is based on the facts from the biography of the American writer O. Henry and on his two novels.

== Plot ==
The Great Consoler (1933)

Saleswoman Dulcie dreams of a better, beautiful world. Her dreams are based on the stories of writer Bill Porter, who became a victim of a judicial verdict and began his literary career in prison. No special misdemeanors are attributed to him and he even enjoys the right of free movement. The administration appreciates the writer because while serving his sentence he writes beautiful stories with happy endings.

Soon, however the successful writer has to face the obvious injustices going on in the prison. In particular, the writer's friend, Jim Valentine is severely beaten for politically motivated reasons. However, Valentine is offered freedom in exchange for help in opening a safe. This proposal allows Porter to think about the imminent departure of his friend from prison. Fantasies on this topic become the basis for a new story.

But the prison administration does not keep the promise and Valentine soon dies. His death is marked by a revolt of prisoners who are dissatisfied with the existing order. Dulcie's pipe dreams are also destroyed and she ends up killing her roommate.

And Bill Porter comes to the conclusion that he is not able to resist the existing order but that someday another one will come.

== Cast ==
- Konstantin Khokhlov - Bill Porter
- Ivan Novoseltsev - Jim Valentine - aka Ralph D. Spenser
- Vasili Kovrigin - Warden
- Andrei Fajt - Det. Ben Price
- Daniil Vvedensky - Jailguard
- Weyland Rodd - Black convict
- O. Rayevskaya - Jim's mother
- S. Sletov - Jailguard
- Aleksandra Khokhlova - Dulcie
- Galina Kravchenko - Annabel Adams
- Pyotr Galadzhev - E. Adams - banker / reporter
- Vera Lopatina - Sadie
- Mikhail Doronin - Innkeeper
- Andrei Gorchilin - Convict

== Production ==
The Great Consoler was done extremely efficiently and did not exceed the budget. The picture was filmed in forty days; editing and soundtrack were completed in sixteen days. The cinematography was done using Soviet manufactured film stock. Kuleshov when making the film, relied heavily on rehearsals, making sure that the actors would totally replicate the results on screen.
