= Disappearance of 'The Eagle' =

- Russian: Гибель «Орла»
- Directed by: Vasily Zhuravlyov
- Written by: Georgiy Grebner; Konstantin Zolotovskiy
- Starring: Nikolai Annenkov; Viktor Gromov; Sergey Stolyarov; Mikhail Troyanovskiy; Sergey Komarov; Lev Fenin
- Cinematography: Yuli Fogelman
- Music by: David Blok; Vano Muradeli
- Release date: 1940
- Country: Soviet Union

Disappearance of 'The Eagle', (Russian: Гибель «Орла») is a 1940 Soviet adventure film directed by Vasily Zhuravlyov.

== Plot ==
The film takes place in 1920 during the civil war, the Soviet army fights on the outskirts of Novorossiysk. At the berths of the port is one of the most powerful domestic ships - the Eagle. The boatswain of the ship Mikhail Gruzdev was able to persuade Captain Chistyakov to put a red flag on the ship, the settlement of which the ship left Novorossiysk, and Gruzdev went in search of him.

== Cast ==
Disappearance of 'The Eagle' (1940)

- Nikolai Annenkov as Fyodor Platonovich Chistyakov
- Viktor Gromov as Mikhail Terentevich Gruzdev
- Sergey Stolyarov as Fyodor Fyodorovich Chistyakov
- Mikhail Troyanovskiy as Ilya Mitrofanovich Svetlov
- Sergey Komarov
- Lev Fenin
- Andrey Fayt
- Pyotr Sobolevsky as Vasiliy Ivanovich Pylnov
- Nikolay Gorlov as Ivan Petrovich
- Ivan Bobrov as Zhukov
