= Mikhail Narokov =

Russian actor

- Born: Mikhail Semyonovich Yakubov; March 10, 1879
- Died: June 25, 1958 (aged 79); Moscow, RSFSR, Soviet Union
- Occupations: Actor, theater director
- Years active: 1896–1949

Mikhail Semyonovich Narokov (Russian: Михаил Семёнович Нароков) was a Soviet and Russian stage and film actor and theater director. People's Artist of the RSFSR (1937).

== Selected filmography ==
- The Alarm (1917) as Zheleznov, millionaire
- The Yellow Ticket (1927) as Belsky, landlord
- Man from the Restaurant (1927) as Karasyov, manufacturer

== Awards and honors ==
- People's Artist of the RSFSR (1937)
- Two Orders of the Red Banner of Labour (1937, 1949)
