= The House on Trubnaya =

1928 film

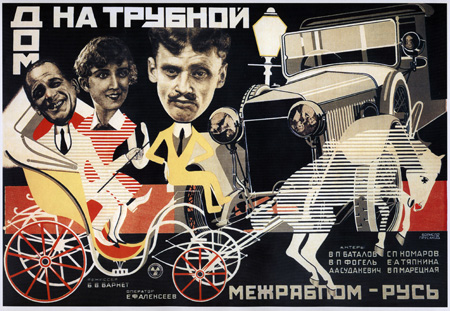
- Film poster
- Directed by: Boris Barnet
- Written by: Bella Zorich; Viktor Shklovsky; Anatoli Marienhof; Vadim Shershenevich; Nikolai Erdman
- Starring: Vera Maretskaya; Vladimir Fogel
- Cinematography: Yevgeni Alekseyev
- Production company: Mezhrabpom-Rus
- Release date: 1928
- Running time: 84 minutes
- Country: Soviet Union
- Language: Russian

The House on Trubnaya (Russian: Дом на Трубной, romanized: Dom na Trubnoy) is a 1928 comedy film directed by Boris Barnet and starring Vera Maretskaya.

== Plot ==
The House on Trubnaya (1928)

The film is set in Moscow at the height of the 1921–28 New Economic Policy. The petty-bourgeois public carries out their philistine life full of bustle and gossip in the house on the Trubnaya Street. One of the tenants, Mr. Golikov (Vladimir Fogel), owner of a hairdressing salon, is looking for a housekeeper who is modest, hard-working and non-union. A country girl nicknamed Paranya, full name Praskovya Pitunova (Vera Maretskaya) seems like a suitable candidate to him. Soon the house on Trubnaya receives the shocking news that Praskovya Pitunova has been elected deputy of the Mossovet by the maids' Trade Union.

== Cast ==
- Vera Maretskaya as Parasha Pitunova - housemaid
- Vladimir Fogel as Mr. Golikov - hairdresser
- Yelena Tyapkina as Mrs. Golikova
- Sergei Komarov as Lyadov
- Anel Sudakevich as Marisha-maid
- Ada Vojtsik as Fenya
- Vladimir Batalov as Semyon Byvalov - chauffeur
- Aleksandr Gromov as Uncle Fedya
- Vladimir Uralsky (as V. Uralsky)

== Production ==
The script, then entitled "Parasha" and written by Bella Zorich, circulated at the Mezhrabpom-Rus studio for a long time without getting made into a film. The screenplay was written for Sergei Komarov, but after discussion it was decided that Boris Barnet would adapt the film. Zorich said that the story of the new Cinderella – Paranya Pitunova – was supposed to show how the Leninist slogan "Every cook must learn to govern the state" was interpreted in a distorted way by the philistine laymen. However Boris Barnet, when starting work on the film immediately commenced with modifying the script; the screenplay faced numerous rewrites by a multitude of authors including Viktor Shklovsky, Nikolai Erdman, Anatoli Marienhof and Vadim Shershenevich. The finished picture lost much of its satiric tone.

== Reception ==
The Russian Guild of Film Critics placed The House on Trubnaya in their list "The 100 best films of national cinema". In a 2008 survey by Seans magazine, film critic Stanislav F. Rostotsky listed it second among his 10 favourite Russian films.
