= Konstantin Khokhlov =

Russian and Soviet actor (1885–1956)

- Константин Хохлов
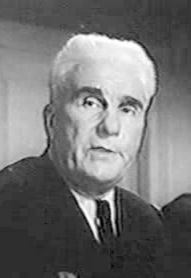
- Born: 1 November 1885 [O.S. 20 October] Moscow, Russia
- Died: January 1, 1956 (aged 70); Leningrad, Russian SFSR, Soviet Union
- Occupations: Actor; Theater director; Teacher
- Years active: 1916–1948
- Spouse: Aleksandra Khokhlova (m. 1914, divorced)

Konstantin Pavlovich Khokhlov (Note: Russian: Константин Павлович Хохлов, romanized: Konstantin Pavlovich Khokhlov; Ukrainian: Костянтин Павлович Хохлов, romanized: Kostiantyn Pavlovych Khokhlov) (1 November 1885 [O.S. 20 October] – 1 January 1956) was a Russian and Soviet stage and film actor, theater director, teacher. Khokhlov had an active career in Ukraine and Russia. He received the title of People's Artist of the USSR (1944).

== Selected filmography ==
- 1918 — Be Silent, My Sorrow, Be Silent
- 1927 — The Club of the Big Deed
- 1932 — Horizon
- 1933 — The Great Consoler
- 1936 — Journey to Arzrum
