= The Extraordinary Adventures of Mr. West in the Land of the Bolsheviks =

1924 film by Lev Kuleshov

- Film poster
- Directed by: Lev Kuleshov
- Written by: Nikolai Aseyev; Vsevolod Pudovkin; Lev Kuleshov
- Starring: Porfiri Podobed; Boris Barnet; Aleksandra Khokhlova; Vsevolod Pudovkin
- Cinematography: Aleksandr Levitskii
- Edited by: Aleksandr Levitsky
- Release date: 27 April 1924
- Running time: 86 minutes
- Country: Soviet Union
- Languages: Silent; Russian and English intertitles

The Extraordinary Adventures of Mr. West in the Land of the Bolsheviks (Russian: Необычайные приключения мистера Веста в стране Большевиков, romanized: Neobychainye priklyucheniya mistera Vesta v strane bolshevikov) is a 1924 Soviet silent comedy film directed by Lev Kuleshov. Kuleshov considered the film a "verification" of his theories around editing and montage, and he drew inspiration from American cinema, which he found more engaging than Russian cinema.

The film follows J. S. West and Cowboy Jeddy, two Americans who visit the Soviet Union after the Russian Revolution. West is wealthy but naive, and he expects the country to be barbaric. A Soviet gang leader exploits West's fears by staging a fake arrest and trial, then offers to "rescue" him in exchange for money. When West is actually rescued by the Soviet police, he realizes his expectations and stereotypes were wrong and celebrates the country.

Upon its initial release, the film garnered popularity among Soviet audiences; however, Soviet critics criticized its emphasis on American themes and its lack of political engagement. Despite its initial popularity, the film was censored two years after its release. Today, critics and historians often consider Mr. West the beginning of a "golden age" of Soviet cinema. The movie satirizes American perceptions of the Soviet Union.

== Plot ==
J. S. West, director of the YMCA, plans to visit the Soviet Union. His wife reads magazine articles that portray Russians as barbarians, and asks him to bring Cowboy Jeddy as a bodyguard. When West and Jeddy arrive in Moscow, a thief steals one of their suitcases and brings it to a gang leader named Zhban. Realizing that West is wealthy and distrusts Russians, Zhban concocts a plan to scam him.

West and Jeddy hire a taxi, but Jeddy gets separated and forgets the car's license plate. Frustrated and concerned for West's safety, he hijacks a carriage. When the police try to arrest him, Jeddy escapes by fleeing along rooftops, then unexpectedly reunites with Ellie, a woman he once saved from being mugged in the United States. Ellie vouches for his character, explaining that he falsely believed Russians were savages, and convinces the police to let him free.

Zhban returns West's suitcase, claiming he recovered it from a barbarian, and invites West to stay with him for safety. He gives West a fake tour of Moscow, which purportedly shows that the Moscow State University and Bolshoi Theatre have been destroyed. One of Zhban's gang members, the Countess, tries to seduce West. Zhban hires another group of criminals to dress as exaggerated Russian stereotypes, kidnap West and the Countess, stage a show trial, and sentence them to death. Zhban then "rescues" West and the Countess in exchange for West's money.

Zhban's scheme is interrupted by the police, who arrive with Jeddy and Ellie. The police give West a real tour of Moscow, showing him the still-standing University and Theatre and a military parade. Impressed, West sends home a telegram asking his wife to burn the magazines and hang up a picture of Vladimir Lenin.

== Cast ==
- Porfiri Podobed as J. S. West
- Boris Barnet as Cowboy Jeddy
- Aleksandra Khokhlova as The Countess
- Vsevolod Pudovkin as Zhban
- Sergey Komarov as The One-Eyed Man
- Leonid Obolensky as The Dandy
- Valia Lopatina as Ellie

== Background ==
The Extraordinary Adventures of Mr. West in the Land of the Bolsheviks was produced and set in the aftermath of the Russian Revolution. Led by Vladimir Lenin, the Bolsheviks overthrew the Russian government, executed the Tsar and his family, fought a civil war, and established the communist Soviet Union. Western countries largely condemned the revolution's violence; the United States would not diplomatically recognize the Soviet Union until 1933.

Lenin nationalized the country's film industry in 1919, but his 1921 New Economic Policy required it to fund itself. The state paid for new Soviet cinema with profits from imported American films. These imported films were extremely popular, leading Lev Kuleshov to coin the term amerikanshchina (American-itis).

Many Russian filmmakers left after the revolution, but Kuleshov stayed and worked to develop a new Soviet cinema. He organized a workshop called the Kuleshov Collective to develop a new approach to filmmaking. His approach was informed by film shortages. The workshop staged theatrical "films without film", using curtains and lighting to represent cuts and close-ups and a "spacial metric grid" to visualize the hypothetical movie screen. He developed a preference for short shots over long shots to avoid mistakes. Kuleshov believed editing distinguished film from theater, and considered montage as fundamental to cinema as harmony is to music. He rejected Konstantin Stanislavski's acting method, which focused on psychology and emotion. Instead, Kuleshov wanted his actors to emphasize precise, legible movements. He found Hollywood action and slapstick more engaging than the work of Russian directors like Aleksandr Khanzhonkov, and felt cinema should be efficient and industrial to help its audience embrace modernity.

== Production ==
In 1924, the Kuleshov Collective released The Extraordinary Adventures of Mr West in the Land of the Bolsheviks as its first feature. Kuleshov himself directed the film, and his students, including Boris Barnet and Vsevolod Pudovkin, played the lead roles. The movie was filmed from 15 December 1923 to 7 April 1924.

Nikolai Aseyev wrote an initial script for the film, but Kuleshov and Pudovkin extensively rewrote it. Kuleshov later said they kept only the characters' names. The plot may have been influenced by a 1923 story in Krokodil called "The Adventures of Mr. Stupidhead in Russia", which also featured a foreigner who believes Russia is barbaric; when Mr. Stupidhead instead sees a functional society, he assumes it's a facade. The film's working title was How Will This End? Its ultimate title alludes to adventure stories like The Legend of the Glorious Adventures of Tyl Ulenspiegel in the Land of Flanders and Elsewhere.

Kuleshov and his actors choreographed scenes and rehearsed using stopwatches and metronomes to avoid wasting film. In one scene, Boris Barnet fell while traversing a tightrope, claiming that Kuleshov left him hanging for a half hour while criticizing his insufficient training.

== Style ==
The Extraordinary Adventures of Mr. West in the Land of the Bolsheviks

The Extraordinary Adventures of Mr. West in the Land of the Bolsheviks is a satirical comedy. Kuleshov considered the film a "verification" of his approach to montage and production, and Rimgaila Salys describes it as a "compendium" of his cinematic ideas. The film includes chases and stunts inspired by popular American cinema, rapid editing, slow motion, flashbacks, and re-contextualized documentary footage. Kuleshov includes visual jokes (such as Zhban getting hit with a žban), parodies of religious icons, and references to films like Neighbors, The Cabinet of Dr Caligari, and Dr Mabuse the Gambler. The cinematography and editing reflect the characters' mindsets: when West is homesick, the film superimposes American faces onto Soviet women, and when Jeddy forgets West's license plate number, it shows the number 999 dissolve into 666. Instead of simply providing exposition, the title cards offer comments like "Comfort is a relative concept". In one instance, an intertitle explains that West sees the room spinning, and the camera shows the spinning room that he perceives.

Kuleshov arranged objects, characters, and motion along grid lines and 45 degree angles, which he felt made the action easiest for audiences to understand. For example, when Jeddy crosses the tightrope between buildings, the wire is horizontal and the buildings are vertical. In one scene, a jug is placed close to the camera to emphasize its eventual destruction; Kuleshov determined the most impactful framing of the jug using a mathematical formula he devised.

The actors' performances are physical and exaggerated. In contrast, the production design is minimalist. Many scenes avoid sets by using close-ups or filming against solid black backgrounds. This was partly a stylistic choice to focus on the actors and key objects, and partly a response to material shortages.

== Themes and analysis ==
J. S. West is modeled on Harold Lloyd. He is gullible, effeminate, bourgeois, naive, prudish, and excessively patriotic, waving an American flag when arriving in Moscow and wearing American flag socks. Jeddy, modeled on Tom Mix and Douglas Fairbanks, is a caricature of a cowboy, complete with a lasso and gun. His appearance and behavior are conspicuously out of place in snow-covered Moscow. West and Jeddy are satirical characters, but they are portrayed as well-intentioned and more noble than the Russian criminals. For example, West's patriotism inspires him to fight like a "real American" to defend himself and the Countess. As Jeddy learns that Russia does not match his stereotypes, he also stops looking like a stereotypical cowboy. By the end of the film, he wears plain contemporary clothes.

The film satirizes Western perceptions of the Soviet Union, but it has also been read as critiquing the Soviet Union itself. Rimgaila Salys says the film showcases the negative effects of Lenin's New Economic Policy. Vlada Petrić suggests that West's kidnapping and show trial, as well as the police raid that saves him, echo the tactics of the Soviet secret police. He argues that Soviet audiences would have recognized the implication that the gang does represent the Bolsheviks after all, and he interprets West's final telegram as mocking unrealistic communist rhetoric. Peter Christensen believes the name "J. S. West" not only alludes to the Western world and the Wild West, but also to Edward Bellamy's 1888 novel Looking Backward, in which a time traveler named Julian West visits a utopian Socialist future. In Christensen's analysis, this allusion emphasizes the Soviet Union's failure to achieve Bellamy's ideals. He notes that the film depicts Russia as a nation of poor criminals, and that the ending merely celebrates pre-revolutionary architecture, not anything created by the Bolsheviks themselves. Conversely, Marina Levitina does interpret the film's final shot of a Russian radio tower as a boast of new technological achievements.

Greta Matzner-Gore observes that the film is built around nested and metatextual imitations, highlighting cinema's potential to mislead. West's kidnappers imitate pictures of Americans who were imitating stereotypical Russians, but in reality, the "Americans" in the photos were played by the same Russian actors who "imitate" them. She notes that the film compares Zhban to a film director, commanding actors in a performance and orchestrating visual effects to deceive Mr. West, and that West remains equally credulous throughout the film. He accepts the police officer's tour exactly as he accepted Zhban's fake tour, and he's impressed by the military parade, which a title card asserts is "real" although it's actually an editing trick. Likewise, David Gillespie finds the ending "ambivalent". He notes that the film consistently emphasizes false images of Russia, and therefore the audience can't be confident the closing images are actually true. The ending includes an incongruous scene of factory workers, which is unconnected to the plot and not observed by West himself. Denise Youngblood speculates Kuleshov may have been forced to include the scene, but Miguel Gaggiotti suggests the film juxtaposes the workers' naturalism against the artificiality of the parade, emphasizing that the parade is merely another performance.

== Reception and legacy ==
Audiences responded positively to Mr. West's accessible American style, and it was Kuleshov's most popular film. In retrospect, it is considered the beginning of a "golden age" of Soviet cinema. Peter Christensen notes that the film has endured better than other Soviet comedies of the time, and David Gillespie considers it a "masterpiece of technique". The film also has historical value as a record of Moscow in the 1920s, showcasing architecture like the original Cathedral of Christ the Saviour. In a 2008 survey by Seans magazine, film critic Veronika Khlebnikova listed it fifth among her 10 favourite Russian films.

Despite the film's success, Kuleshov was criticized for his focus on aesthetics and technique over ideology and his focus on American characters; six of Kuleshov's 13 films would feature American characters and themes. In particular, Viktor Shklovsky criticized the film for not being sufficiently Russian. Critics unfavorably compared Kuleshov to Sergei Eisenstein and Vsevolod Pudovkin, whose films were unequivocally pro-Bolshevik. By September 1926, Mr. West was censored. Despite this backlash, Kuleshov was eventually awarded the Order of Lenin shortly before his death in 1970.
