= Sadriddin Ayni =

Tajik writer and intellectual (1878–1954)

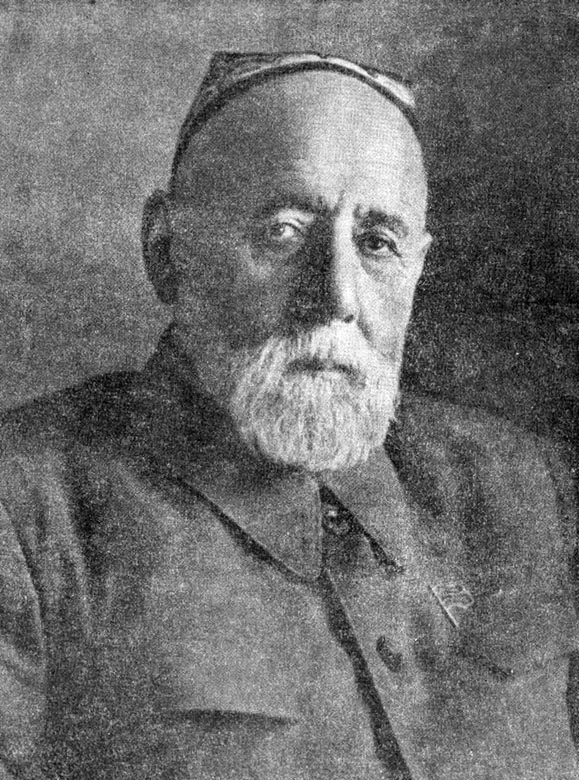
- Sadriddin Ayni
- Born: 15 April 1878; Sāktare, Emirate of Bukhara, Russian Empire (now Gʻijduvon District, Bukhara Region, Uzbekistan)
- Died: 15 July 1954 (aged 76); Stalinabad, Tajik SSR, USSR (now Dushanbe, Tajikistan)
- Awards: Order of Lenin (3); USSR State Prize; Hero of Tajikistan; Order of Outstanding Merit

Sadriddin Ayni (Note: Also spelled as Sadriddin Aini) (Tajik: Садриддин Айнӣ, Persian: صدرالدين عينى, Russian: Садриддин Саидмуродович Саидмуродов; 15 April 1878 – 15 July 1954) was a Tajik intellectual who wrote poetry, fiction, journalism, and history, as well as a dictionary. He is regarded by Tajiks as Tajikistan's national poet and one of the most important writers in the country's history.

== Biography ==
Ayni was born into a peasant family in the village of Sāktare in what was then the Emirate of Bukhara (now Gʻijduvon District). His mother Zevar came from the village of Mahalla-i Bālā of Shofirkon tuman (now Bukhara Region of the Republic of Uzbekistan). He became an orphan at 12 and moved to join his older brother in Bukhara, where he attended the Mir-i Arab madrasa and learned to write in Arabic.

Studying in madrasa, Ayni simultaneously worked as a janitor and cook. The future writer was closely acquainted with prominent Bukhara intellectuals, among whom were Sadr-i Ziya, Damulla Ikram and others. Sadriddin Ayni was a participant of the movement of enlighteners - jadids.

An important moment in the life of the future writer was the communication with the workers of the cotton ginning plant at Kızıltepe station, where he worked from September 1915 to April 1916. It was there that he found the heroes of his first novels, published many years later.

But before becoming a writer, before unconditionally and joyfully accepting the October Revolution, Ayni had to pass another moral and physical test.

In April 1917, in front of the Emir's residence in Bukhara, there was a performance by the extreme reactionary forces of the Emirate, mainly representatives of the clergy. Ayni refused to participate in this demonstration of loyalty. For this he was seized at home by furious fanatics and publicly punished: he received 75 blows with sticks. The tormented Ayni was thrown into the grim dungeon that is Obhona Prison. He would have shared the hard fate of many of his fellow citizens, if soon Bolsheviks, whom the Soviet of Workers' and Soldiers' Deputies of Kogon had sent to help the victims of the Emir's terror, had not come to the rescue. On the square in front of the prison a spontaneous rally arose. It was then that Ayni for the first time stood up under the red banner of the revolution.

In the early 1920s, Ayni helped to propagate the Russian Revolution in Uzbekistan and Tajikistan. In 1934, he attended the first Soviet Congress of Writers as the Tajik representative. By purporting national identity in his writings, he was able to escape the Soviet censors that quieted many intellectuals in Central Asia. He was member of the Supreme Soviet of Tajikistan for 20 years, was awarded the Order of Lenin three times, and was the first president of the Academy of Sciences of Tajik SSR. After 1992, his writing helped to bind together a sense of Tajik nationalism that survived the collapse of the Soviet Union.

Ayni gave indigenous Tajik literature in Tajikistan a boost in 1927 by writing Dokhunda, the first Tajikistani novel in the Tajik language. In 1934 and 1935, leading Russian director Lev Kuleshov worked for two years in Tajikistan at a movie based on Dokhunda but the project was regarded with suspicion by the authorities as possibly exciting Tajik nationalism, and stopped. No footage survives. Ayni's four-volume Yoddoshtho (Memoirs), completed 1949-54 are famous and widely read. In 1956, Tajik director Boris (Besion) Kimyagarov (1920–1979) was finally able to get approval for a movie version of Dokhunda.

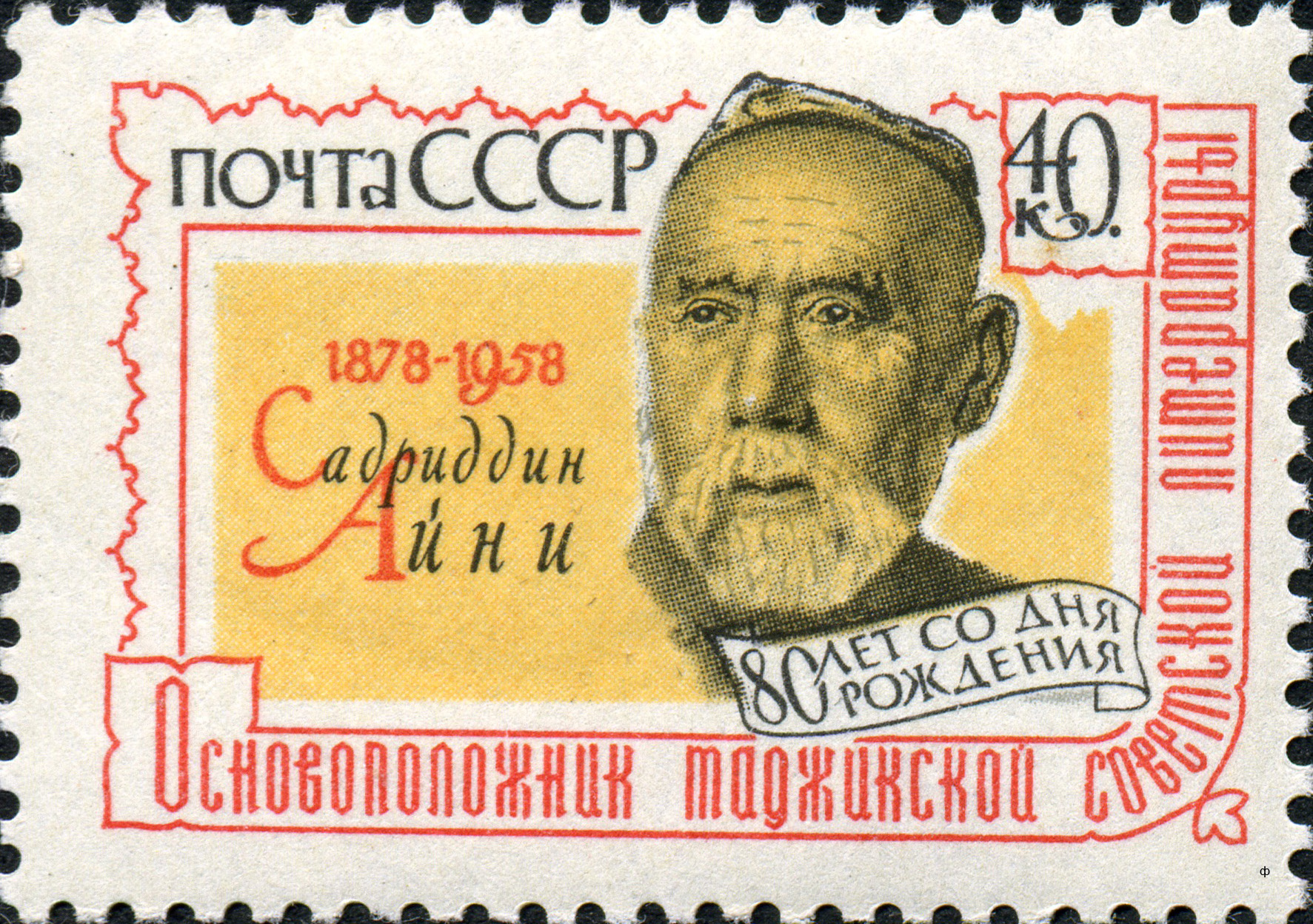
Sadriddin Ayni on a 1958 Soviet stamp

Ayni's early poems were about love and nature, but after the national awakening in Tajikistan, his subject matter shifted to the dawn of the new age and the working class. His writings often criticized the Amir of Bukhara. Two well-known are The Slave and The Bukhara Executioners.

Prior to the opening of the tomb of Timur, he was warned by a group of elderly men about the tomb being cursed, but ignored the warning as a legend created to deter grave robbers. Shortly after the tomb was opened, Hitler invaded the Soviet Union.

Ayni died in Dushanbe on 15 July 1954. There is a mausoleum in his honor where he is buried.

== Translations ==
Ainī, Sadriddin, and John R. Perry. 1998. The sands of Oxus: boyhood reminiscences of Sadriddin Aini. Costa Mesa, Calif: Mazda Publishers.
