= Journey to Arzrum (film) =

- Russian: Путешествие в Арзрум
- Directed by: Moisei Levin
- Written by: Mikhail Bleiman; Ilya Zilbershtein
- Starring: Dmitry Zhuravlyov; Serafim Azanchevsky; Konstantin Khokhlov; Georgy Sochevko; Nikolay Ryzhov
- Cinematography: Nikolay Ushakov
- Music by: Nikolay Strelnikov
- Production company: Lenfilm
- Release date: 1936
- Running time: 72 min.
- Country: Soviet Union
- Language: Russian

Journey to Arzrum (Russian: Путешествие в Арзрум, romanized: Puteshestvie v Arzrum) is a 1936 Soviet drama film directed by Moisei Levin.

== Plot ==
The film is an adaptation of Alexander Pushkin's eponymous travel account of his journey to the Caucasus, Armenia, and Arzrum (modern Erzurum) in eastern Turkey during the Russo-Turkish War (1828–29).

== Cast ==
- Dmitry Zhuravlyov as Alexander Pushkin
- Serafim Azanchevsky as Ivan Paskevich
- Konstantin Khokhlov as Nurtsev
- Georgy Sochevko as Chernishev
- Nikolay Ryzhov as Rayevsky
- Lev Kolesov as Buturlin
- Georgy Semyonov as Somichyov
