= Ada Voytsik =

Soviet actress

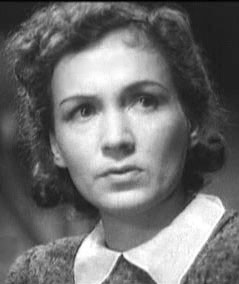
- Born: Ada Ignatievna Voytsik; 1 August 1905; Moscow, Russian Empire
- Died: 2 September 1982 (aged 77); Moscow, USSR
- Occupation: Actress
- Years active: 1926-1971

Ada Ignatievna Voytsik (Russian: Ада Игнатьевна Войцик; 1 August 1905 – 2 September 1982) was a Soviet actress and recipient of the title of RSFSR Honored Artist (1935).

== Biography ==
Ada Ignatievna Voytsik was born on 1 August 1905 in Moscow.

In 1923 Ada graduated from secondary school and entered the acting department of the State College of Cinematography (today known as VGIK), where she graduated in 1927.

She started acting in cinema in the year 1925. In 1934 Ada Voytsik joined the staff of the Mosfilm film studio.

She married director Ivan Pyryev and they had a son, Erik Pyryev (1931-1970), who also subsequently became a director.

In 1941 together with the studio she was evacuated to Alma-Ata.

On her return to Moscow in 1943, Ada became an actress at the National Film Actors' Theatre, where she worked until her retirement in 1961.

In the last years of her life, Ada Voytsik did not appear in films.

Ada Voytsik lived through the death of her son and husband. She died in Moscow on 2 September 1982 at the age of 77, and was buried in the Khovanskoye Cemetery, in Moscow.

== Selected filmography ==
- Kak Mitya Tyurin zanimalsya fizkulturoy (1926)
- Rasplata (1926) as Lisa
- The Forty-First (1927) as Maryutka
- Raznostoronniy treugolnik (1927) as Wifey
- Bulat-Batır (1928) as Asma
- Svoi i chuzhiye (1928) as Shura
- The House on Trubnaya (1928) as Fenya
- The Doll With Millions (1928) as Maria Ivanova
- The Happy Canary (1929) as Brio's wife
- Ukhod za bolnym (1929) as Nurse
- Nenavist (1930) as Stefa
- Konveer smerti (1933) as Luisa
- Partiynyy bilet (1936) as Anna Kulikova
- The Oppenheim Family (1939) as Liselotte Lavendal Oppenheim
- The Murderers are Coming (1942) as Marta
- Dream (1943) as Vanda
- Once There Was a Girl (1944) as Nastenka's Mother
- Ivan the Terrible (1945/1958) as Elena Glinskaya
- Attack from the Sea (1952) as Queen Carolina
- Syn (1955)
- Puti i sudby (1956) as Maria Vasilyevna
- Delo N. 306 (1956) as Yelizaveta Nekrasova
- Raznye sudby (1956) as Mariya Morozova
- Moya doch (1956) as Lidiya Arkadyevna
- Prizvaniye (1957) as Maria Pavlovna
- Rozhdyonnye burey (1958) as Yadviga Rayevskaya
- Ivan the Terrible Part II (1958) as Elena Glinskaya
- Soldatskoye serdtse (1959) as Anna Kryshko
- Sampo (1959) as Mother of Lemminkäinen
- Lyuboy tsenoy (1959) as Shura's mother
- Kolybelnaya (1960) as Yekaterina Borisovna
- Nine Days in One Year (1962) as Maria Tikhonovna
- Vyzyvaem ogon na sebya (1963, TV Mini-Series)
- All the King's Men (1971, TV Mini-Series) (final appearance)
