= Aleksandra Khokhlova =

Russian and Soviet actress (1891–1985)

- Александра Хохлова
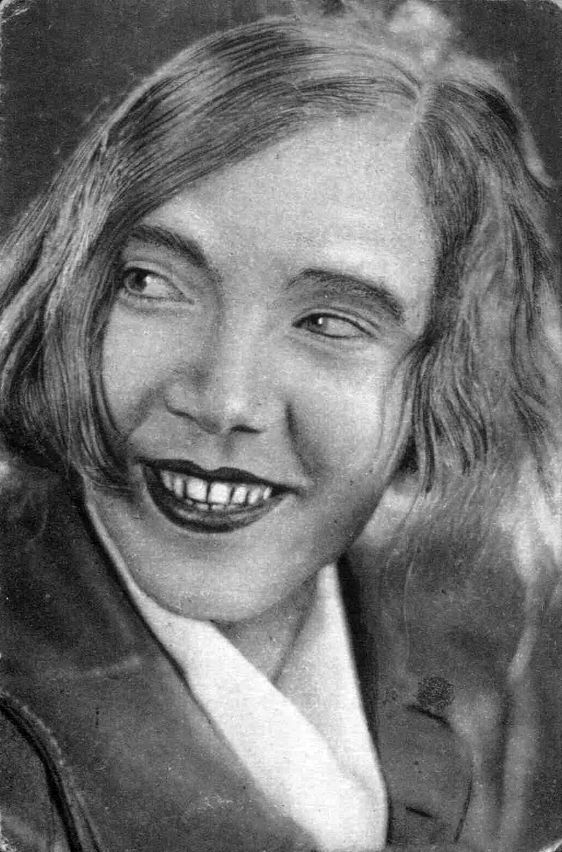
- Khokhlova in 1933
- Born: Alexandra Sergeyevna Botkina; 3 November 1891; Berlin, Germany
- Died: 22 August 1985; Moscow, Soviet Union
- Resting place: Novodevichy Cemetery, Moscow
- Occupations: Actress; theatre director; writer; educator
- Spouses: Konstantin Khokhlov (m. 1914, divorced) Lev Kuleshov (m. 1923; died 1970)
- Children: 1
- Relatives: Pavel Tretyakov (grandfather); Sergey Botkin (grandfather); Mikhail Botkin (great-uncle); Vasily Botkin (great-uncle); Eugene Botkin (uncle)

Aleksandra Sergeyevna Khokhlova (née Botkina; Russian: Александра Сергеевна Хохлова, 3 November 1891 – 22 August 1985) was a Russian and Soviet actress, theatre director, writer, and educator.

== Biography ==
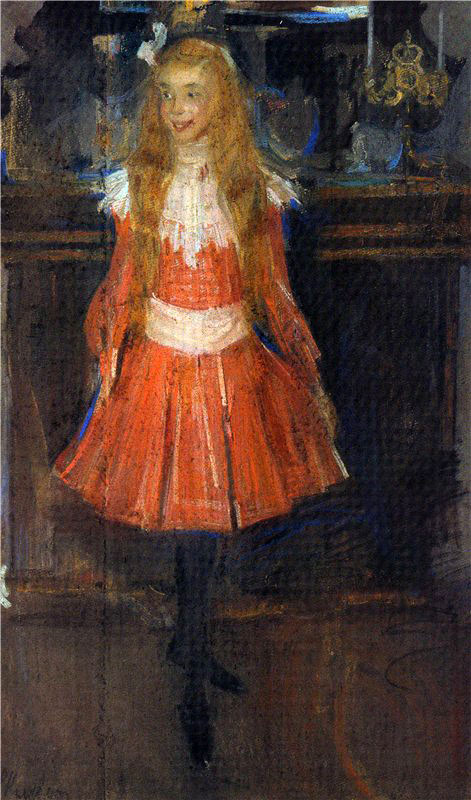
"Little Foxy" by Filipp Malyavin, 1902

The daughter of Sergei Botkin (1859–1910), a physician, and Alexandra Pavlovna Botkina (née Tretyakova, 1867–1959), Alexandra Sergeyevna Botkina was born in Berlin, Germany. She had a sister, Anastasia, and was the granddaughter of Pavel Tretyakov, a philanthropist and patron of the arts. In 1914, she married actor Konstantin Khokhlov. They had one child together, a son named Sergei.

She appeared as a supporting actress in the 1916 film Uragan ('Hurricane') directed by Boris Sushkevich and in the 1918 film Iola directed by Władysław Starewicz. In 1919, she passed the entrance exam for the State Institute of Cinematography in Moscow. There she met Lev Kuleshov who would become her partner in film and in life. Khokhlova appeared in the 1920 film Na krasnom fronte ('On the Red Front') directed by Kuleshov; he also acted in the film, which combined archival footage with staged film sequences. Khokhlova's career in film was cut short when she fell out of favour because of her family's wealth and connections with Tsar Nicholas II.

Besides acting and directing, Khokhlova also taught a workshop at the state institute with Kuleshov. In 1935, she received the title of Merited Artist.

With her husband, she published a memoir 50 Let v Kino ('50 Years in Cinema').

Khokhlova died in Moscow at the age of 93.

== Selected filmography ==
=== Acting roles ===
- Zheleznaia Piata (The Iron Heel) (1919) directed by Vladimir Gardin
- Neobychainye prikliucheniia mistera Vesta v strane bolshevikov (The Extraordinary Adventures of Mr. West in the Land of the Bolsheviks), comedy (1924) directed by Lev Kuleshov
- Luch smerti (The Death Ray) (1925) directed by Lev Kuleshov, Kholhlova was also assistant director
- Po zakonu (By the Law) (1926) directed by Lev Kuleshov
- Vasha znakomaia (Your Acquaintance) (1927) directed by Lev Kuleshov
- Velikii uteshitel' (The Great Consoler) (1933) directed by Lev Kuleshov, Kholhlova was also assistant director
- Sibiryaki' (Siberians) (1940) directed by Lev Kuleshov

=== Directing ===
- Delo s zastezhkami (An affair of the clasps) (1929)
- Sasha (1930)
- Igrushki (Toys) (1933)

=== Assistant director ===
- My s Urala (We from the Urals) (1943), directed by Lev Kuleshov
