= Nikolay Annenkov =

Soviet and Russian actor (1899-1999)

- Николай Анненков
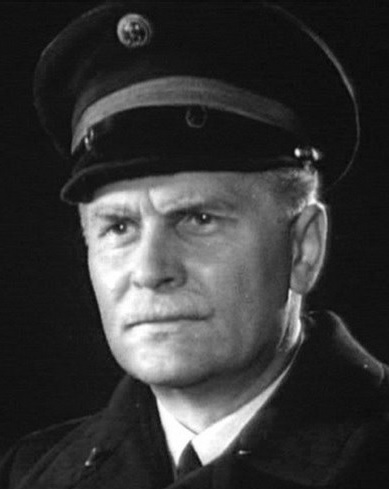
- Annenkov in the Disappearance of 'The Eagle' (1940)
- Born: September 20, 1899; Inzhavino, Russian Empire
- Died: September 30, 1999 (aged 100); Moscow, Russia
- Occupation: Actor

Nikolay Aleksandrovich Annenkov (Russian: Николай Александрович Анненков; 20 September [O.S. 8 September] 1899 – 30 September 1999, born Kokin) (Note: Russian: Кокин, romanized: Kokin) was a Soviet actor who was the longest-lived People's Artist of the USSR before Igor Moiseyev and Vladimir Zeldin.

Annenkov was born in Inzhavino, Tambov Governorate and worked in the Maly Theatre from 1924 until his centenary and was awarded three Stalin Prizes. Annenkov celebrated his 100th birthday playing on stage but died only 10 days later in Moscow.

He acted in the 1955 film The First Echelon.

== Honours and awards ==
- Honored Artist of the RSFSR (1937)
- People's Artist of the RSFSR (1949)
- Stalin Prizes:
  - second degree (1947) – for his role of Lieutenant-Maximov in the play "For those who are in the sea!" BA Lavrenev
  - first degree (1948) – for his role Lavrov in the play "The great strength of" BS Romashova
  - first degree (1949) – for his role Alexei Dobrotvor in the movie "The Court of Honour" (1948)
- People's Artist of the USSR (1960)
- Hero of Socialist Labour (1990)
- Four Orders of Lenin
- Order of the October Revolution
- Order of the Red Banner of Labour
- Order of Friendship of Peoples
- Order of the Badge of Honour
- Order "For Merit to the Fatherland"; 2nd and 3rd classes
- Jubilee Medal "In Commemoration of the 100th Anniversary of the Birth of Vladimir Ilyich Lenin"
- Medal "For Battle Merit"
- Medal "For the Defence of Moscow"
- Medal "For the Victory over Germany in the Great Patriotic War 1941–1945"
- Medal "For Valiant Labour in the Great Patriotic War 1941–1945"
- Medal "Veteran of Labour"
- Jubilee Medal "Twenty Years of Victory in the Great Patriotic War 1941–1945"
- Jubilee Medal "Thirty Years of Victory in the Great Patriotic War 1941–1945"
- Jubilee Medal "Forty Years of Victory in the Great Patriotic War 1941–1945"
- Jubilee Medal "50 Years of the Armed Forces of the USSR"
- Jubilee Medal "60 Years of the Armed Forces of the USSR"
- Jubilee Medal "70 Years of the Armed Forces of the USSR"

== See also ==
- List of centenarians (actors, filmmakers and entertainers)
