= Inzhavino =

Inzhavino Инжавино
- Urban-type settlement
- Interactive map of Inzhavino
- Location of Inzhavino Inzhavino (Tambov Oblast)
- Coordinates: 52.3269°N 42.4973°E
- Country: Russia
- Federal subject: Tambov Oblast
- Administrative district: Inzhavinsky District
- Founded: 1705

Population (2010 Census)
  - Total: 9,592
  - Estimate (2021): 7,738 (−19.3%)
- Time zone: UTC+3 (MSK)
- Postal code: 393310
- OKTMO ID: 68608151051

Inzhavino (Russian: Инжа́вино) is an urban locality (an urban-type settlement) in Inzhavinsky District of Tambov Oblast, Russia. Population: 9,592 (2010 census); 10,588 (2002 census); 12,627 (1989 Soviet census).
