= Marietta Shaginyan =

Soviet writer, historian and activist of Armenian descent (1888–1982)

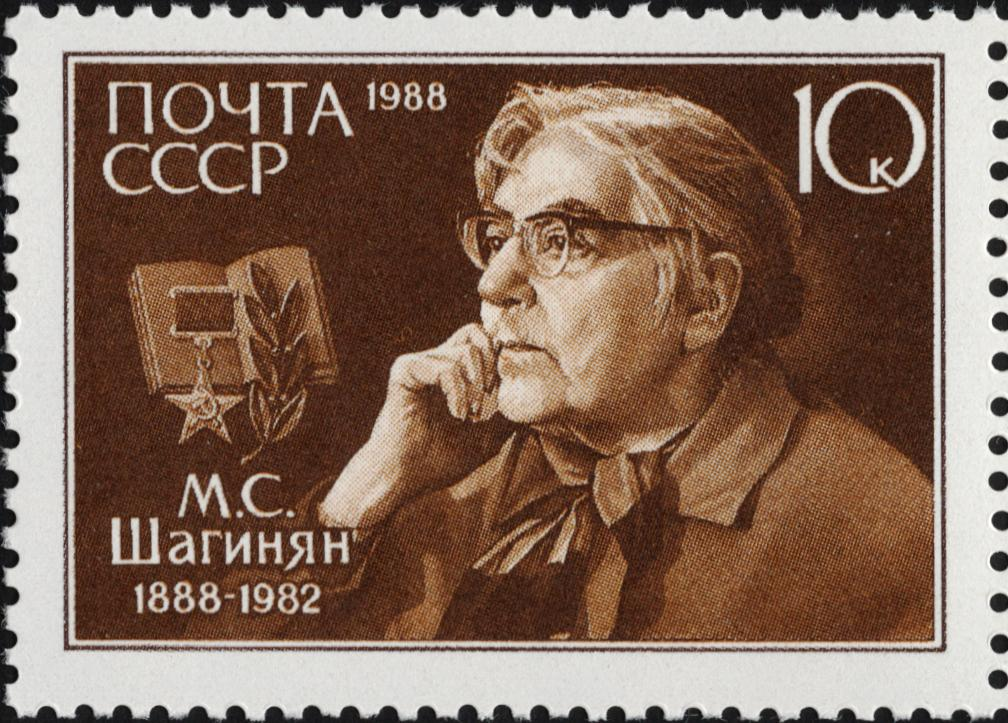
- Soviet stamp featuring Shaginyan
- Born: April 2, 1888; Moscow, Russian Empire
- Died: March 20, 1982 (aged 93); Moscow, Russian SFSR, Soviet Union
- Resting place: Moscow Armenian Cemetery
- Occupations: writer and activist

Marietta Sergeevna Shaginyan (Russian: Мариэ́тта Серге́евна Шагиня́н; Armenian: Մարիետա Սերգեյի Շահինյան, April 2, 1888 – March 20, 1982) was a Soviet writer, historian of Armenian descent. She was one of the "fellow travelers" of the 1920s led by the Serapion Brotherhood and became one of the most prolific communist writers experimenting in satirico-fantastic fiction.

== Career ==
Shaginyan was born in Moscow. Her father was a doctor. She received a private education, and in 1912 obtained a degree in History and Philosophy, and began her career as a writer.

In February 1912 Shaginyan wrote to the composer Sergei Rachmaninoff, signing herself "Re". This was the first of many letters written between them over the next 5 years, many quoted in Bertensson & Leyda. Later in 1912, Rachmaninoff asked her to suggest poems he could set as songs. Many of her suggestions appeared in his Op. 34 set of that year (list of titles in Bertensson & Leyda). The first group, from Pushkin's poem "The Muse" of 1828, he dedicated to her. In 1913 she dedicated her first set of published poems, "Orientalia", to him. Rachmaninoff left Russia in 1917, never to return, and their correspondence ceased at that point.

Shaginyan wrote the novels Mess Mend: Yankees in Petrograd (1923), Three Looms (1929), Hydrocentral (1930–31). In 1931, she wrote to Joseph Stalin asking him to write a foreword to Hydrocentral, and received a reply, dated 20 May, in which Stalin apologised, saying he would have liked to have written one, but was too busy to do so. Reputedly, she carried the note, wrapped in cellophane, in the handbag she always kept with her.

Before and during the Great Purge, she was conspicuously loyal to Stalin personally. In 1934, evidently aware of the tension between Stalin and Russia' most renowned living writer, and the nominal head of the Soviet Writers' Union, Maxim Gorky, in private conversation she denounced Gorky as an "anarchist" and "a petit bourgeois populist." During the mass arrests when Nikolai Yezhov was chief of the NKVD, she had a signed half page article in Pravda in which she claimed that prisoners now known to have been forced to make false confessions under torture were doing so voluntarily out of a sense of responsibility to soviet society. She is also reputed to have complained about fellow writers that "Just because a few people have been arrested, they make all this fuss!"

In August 1938, the first part of her novel A History Exam - the Ulyanov Family, a fictional account of the early life of Lenin was published in the magazine Krasnaya Nov. It had been read and approved by Lenin's widow, Nadezhda Krupskaya, and his brother Dmitri Ulyanov, but caused a scandal because it revealed that Lenin was part Kalmyk. On 5 August, the novel was banned, by order of the Politburo, Shaganyan and Krupskaya were reprimanded, and the editor responsible, Vladimir Yermilov, was sacked. For the next 18 years, she was forced to stop writing in this genre and turned to essay writing. This resolution was overturned by the Central Committee as "erroneous and fundamentally wrong" on 11 October 1956, after which a revised version of the novel was published, and a sequel, The First All-Russian in 1965. The two books won her the Lenin Prize in 1972.

Shaginian spent much of her time in Koktebel, Crimea, where she had bought a summer house for her family. The Russian bohemian elite gathered in Koktebel every summer and stayed there until September, spending time at the Voloshin house. She died in Moscow at the age of 93.

== Personality ==
There is a scathing portrayal of Shaginyan in the memoirs of Nadezhda Mandelstam. She alleged that in the 1920s, Shaginyan made a habit of kissing the hand of Anna Akhmatova whenever they met. "This always put Akhmatova in a frenzy, and at the mere sight of Shaginyan, she fled or dived into the nearest doorway." But after Akhmatova had been denounced by Stalin's culture chief Andrei Zhdanov in 1948, Shaginyan visited the provinces to explain that Akhmatova was "decadent." Mandelstam also claimed that Shaginyan - a "tiny wizened figure" and a "deaf old bore with her thoughts on Lenin and Goethe, and her discovery of a direct relationship between a miner's lamp, the useful activities of Faust, and the famous plan for electrification" - was unusual in that she made a "terrible fuss" if any suspected police spy came near her, when most soviet citizens simply put up with them, but Mandelstam suspected that she sometimes deliberately screamed at people whom she knew were not informers, to deter genuine spies. "Why am I always harping on this woman?" Mandelstam added, finally. "The point is that she was a typical figure of our times, and furthermore she blurted out things on which others were silent."

== Family ==
Marietta's daughter Mireille Shaginian was a painter, who was married to Victor Tsigal, a Russian painter and sculptor. Their son Serega Tsigal is an artist in Moscow. His wife was Lyubov Polishchuk a Russian actress. Serega's daughter Marietta Tsigal followed her mother's steps into acting. She was named after her great grandmother. Marietta Shaginian has two great great grandchildren Anastasia Shaginian and her brother Andrei.

== Legacy ==
A minor planet 2144 Marietta discovered in 1975 by Soviet astronomer Lyudmila Chernykh is named in her honor.

== Books ==
- Originally published under the alias Jim Dollar
  - Mess-Mend: Yankees in Petrograd., 1923; trans. Samuel Cioran. Ann Arbor: Ardis, 1991.
  - Lori Len Metallist [Laurie Lane, Metalworker]. Moscow: Gos-Izd, 1924.
  - Doroga v Bagdad [The Road to Baghdad]. St. Petersburg, 1925.
- Gidrotsentral [HydroCentral]. Leningrad, 1929.
- Armianskaya literatura i iskusstvo [Literature and Art of Armenia]. Yerevan, 1961.
- Taras Shevchenko. Moscow, 1964.
