= Damulla Ikram =

Damulla Ikram (Persian: دامولا اکرام; 1847–1925) was a scholar and teacher in the Emirate of Bukhara.

== Sources ==
- Bečka, J. (1998). "Ekrām, Moḥammad". In Yarshater, Ehsan (ed.). Encyclopædia Iranica (Online ed.). Encyclopædia Iranica Foundation. ISBN 978-0710090959.
