= Vladimir Schneiderov =

Vladimir Schneiderov (Russian: Владимир Адольфович Шнейдеров; 1900–1973) was a Soviet-era explorer and educational film director. A member of the CPSU since 1926, he was awarded the People's Artist of the RSFSR in 1969.

He was targeted by the KGB for alleged anti-Soviet statements. The alleged documents against him were destroyed by the KGB member who recruited CIA agent Aldrich Ames in the 1980s.

== Filmography ==
- 1924 По Самарканд, (About Samarkand)
- 1924 По Узбекистану (About Uzbekistan)
- 1925 Великий перелёт
- 1928 Подножие смерти
- 1930 Эль-Йемен (Аl-Yemen) (About Yemen)
- 1931 На высоте 4500
- 1933 Два океана
- 1934 Золотое озеро (fiction: U.S. title, The Golden Taiga)
- 1935 Джульбарс (фильм)
- 1937 Ущелье Аламасов (фильм)
- 1938 Гайчи
- 1946—1959 киносерия «Путешествия по СССР» (series: Travels in the USSR)
- 1953 Происхождение жизни (Origins of life)
- 1958 Под небом древних пустынь (фильм) (Under the ancient desert sky)
- 1960 Чарльз Дарвин (Charles Darwin)
- 1962 Жозеф Марти (Joseph Martin)

== Awards ==
- Order of Lenin
- Order of the Red Banner of Labor
- Order of the Red Star (14 April 1944)
- Honored Artist of the RSFSR (6 January 1955)
- People's Artist of the RSFSR (29 September 1969)
