= Uygun =

Uygun is a Turkish surname. Notable people with the surname include:

- Bülent Uygun (born 1971), Turkish footballer and manager
- Gürkan Uygun (born 1974), Turkish actor
- Korkut Uygun (born 1975), Turkish chemical engineer and medical researcher
- Samin Uygun, Turkish footballer
- Uyg‘un, (1905–1990), an Uzbek poet, dramatist, writer, and politician
