= Creative geography =

Film editing technique

Creative geography, or artificial landscape, is a film editing technique invented by the early Russian filmmaker Lev Kuleshov sometime around the 1920s. It is a subset of montage, in which multiple segments shot at various locations and/or times are edited together such that they appear to all occur in a continuous place at a continuous time. Creative geography is used constantly in film and television, for instance when a character walks through the front door of a house shown from the outside, to emerge into a sound stage of the house's interior.

It was during the filming of his 1918 film The Project of Engineer Prite, that Lev Kuleshov, pioneer of the assembly as the main pillar of a movie, began to investigate and experiment. The assembly was an unexplored field and devoted part of his career as a director to develop theoretically various articles around it. He accidentally discovered the technique that is being described: the creative geography. He lacked plans for the characters in the film watching electric poles, and to solve the problem, he decided to shoot on the one hand, the characters, looking out of the field, and on the other hand, the poles. The characters were not in the same location of the posts, in fact, they were recorded in different areas of Moscow. However, the assembly achieved the effect of creative geography, that is, it seemed that they were in the same place.

A notable and innovative example of creative geography is the TARDIS time machine on Doctor Who, which looks like a police call box on the outside but is much larger on the inside. The viewer knows that the actors are stepping into a prop and then filming at a sound stage that represents the interior, but, via creative geography and suspension of disbelief, the transition is made seamless.

An extreme example of creative geography occurred in the film Just a Gigolo in a dialogue scene featuring the characters played by David Bowie and Marlene Dietrich. Bowie and Dietrich actually filmed their respective parts separately, in two different rooms months apart: editing and shot-matching were employed in an attempt to convince the audience that these two people were in the same room at the same time. At one point, Dietrich's character gives a memento to Bowie's character: to achieve this, she handed the prop to an "extra actor", who then walked out of frame. In a separate shot, a different "extra actor" (playing the same person) walked into frame and gave the prop to Bowie.

== See also ==
- Continuity editing
