= Cosmic Voyage (1936 film) =

- Theatrical poster
- Directed by: Vasili Zhuravlov
- Written by: Aleksandr Filimonov; Konstantin Tsiolkovsky
- Produced by: Boris Shumyatskiy
- Starring: Sergei Komarov; Kselniya Moskalenko; Vassili Gaponenko; Nikolai Feoktistov; Vasili Kovrigin
- Production company: Mosfilm
- Release date: January 21, 1936
- Running time: 70 minutes
- Country: Soviet Union
- Language: Silent film with Russian intertitles

Cosmic Voyage or The Space Voyage (Russian: Космический рейс, romanized: Kosmicheskiy reys: Fantasticheskaya novella) is a 1936 Soviet science fiction silent film directed by Vasili Zhuravlov and produced by Mosfilm. It was one of the earliest films to represent a realistic spaceflight, including weightlessness as well as one of the last Soviet silent era films.

== Plot ==
In the year 1946, the Soviet space program is undergoing turmoil. Professor Sedikh, who is planning to lead the first crewed exploration to the Moon, is denounced by his rival Professor Karin as being too old and too mentally unstable for the mission. Professor Sedikh, aided by his assistant Marina and a youth named Andryusha, disregard Professor Karin's authority and make a successful landing on the Moon. Although a few problems occur at the Moon, including the discovery of a damaged oxygen tank and Professor Sedikh becoming trapped under a fallen boulder, the expedition is a success and the cosmonauts return to Moscow.

== Cast ==
- Sergei Komarov as Pavel Ivanovich Sedikh
- Ksenia Moskalenko as Marina, Karin's assistant
- Vassili Gaponenko as Andryusha Orlov
- Nikolai Feoktistov as Capt. Viktor Orlov
- Vasili Kovrigin as Professor Karin
- Andrey Karasyov
- Sergey Stolyarov

== Production ==
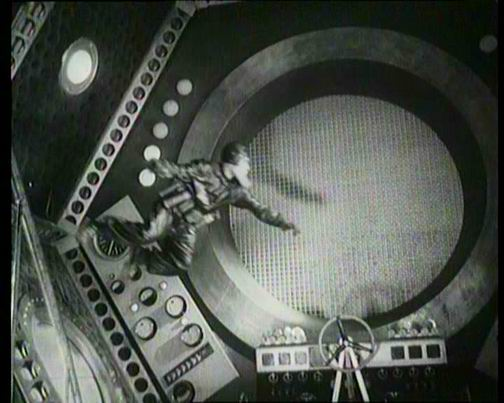
Sergei Komarov as a cosmonaut

Kosmicheskiy reys: Fantasticheskaya novella was initially conceived in 1924 by Russian filmmaker Vasili Zhuravlov, but it was not pursued for production until 1932, when Komsomol (the Communist Union of Youth) recommended the creation of film that would spur an interest in space studies. Zhuravlov consulted with Konstantin Tsiolkovsky, the noted aeronautical theorist and rocket science engineer, on the screenplay. Tsiolkovsky died shortly after the film was completed.

Two spaceships in the film were named after the Soviet leaders Joseph Stalin and Kliment Voroshilov. The film's cosmonauts enter liquid-filled chambers to buffer the impact of takeoff and landing, and they communicate their landing to the Earth by spelling out "CCCP" (the Russian-language acronym for "USSR") with reflective substances spread across the lunar surface.

Kosmicheskiy reys: Fantasticheskaya novella was shot as a silent film and had only a brief release in early 1936 before being removed from circulation by Soviet censors, who felt that stop-motion animated sequences of cosmonauts hopping across the low-gravity lunar surface were antithetical to the spirit of "socialist realism." It was not widely seen again until the 1980s.

== Sources ==
- David Christopher, "Stalin's "Loss of Sensation": Subversive Impulses in Soviet Science-Fiction of the Great Terror," Journal of Science Fiction, Vol. 1, No. 2 (May, 2016), 18-35.
