= Salavat Yulayev (film) =

- Directed by: Yakov Protazanov
- Written by: Stepan Zlobin; Galina Spevak
- Starring: Arslan Muboryakov
- Cinematography: Aleksandr Shelenkov
- Music by: Aram Khachaturian
- Production company: Soyuzdetfilm
- Release date: 1940
- Running time: minutes
- Country: Soviet Union
- Language: Russian

Salavat Yulayev (Russian: Салават Юлаев) is a 1940 Soviet film directed by Yakov Protazanov, about Bashkir national hero, poet Salawat Yulayev (1754-1800) and Pugachev's Rebellion.

== Synopsis ==
Son of the village elder, young Salavat, is forced to permanently leave his native village for physically assaulting an officer of the king. A runaway convict Khlopusha, helps him escape from pursuing soldiers. Salavat does not trust Khlopusha, because he thinks of every Russian as an enemy. But the shared shackles and forced labor in the mines bring them closer together. The friends manage to escape from prison. Two years Salavat and Khlopusha wander around the vast expanses of the Urals. In one of the Cossack farms they meet Pugachev and become his staunch supporters. Salavat is sent home to his native village. The people elevated by them flock to Pugachev's banner. Together with the Russian peasants and workers of the Ural fortified factories, the Bashkir cavalry led by Colonel Salavat is in combat. To fight Pugachev, the tsarist government sends perfectly armed regular troops under the command of Michelson. Betrayal of the Cossack elders helps aggressors to cause serious damage to the people on Pugachev side. Khlopusha is killed in combat. Pugachev is captured by the traitors. Rich Bashkirs manages to find Salavat, and they give him over to the authorities but his friends manage to organize an escape. Far away in the mountains, parting with his associates, Salavat encourages them: "The Bashkir people will live at ease!"

== Cast ==
- Arslan Muboryakov
- Mikhail Bolduman
- Sergei Blinnikov
- Nikolai Kryuchkov
- Nina Nikitina
- Irina Fedotova
- Lev Potyomkin
- Andrei Fajt
- Georgy Millyar

Salavat Yulaev (film)
