= Andrei Fayt =

Soviet actor (1903–1976)

Andrei Fajt
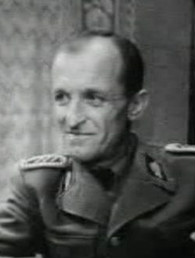
- Born: 29 August 1903; Nizhny Novgorod, Russian Empire
- Died: 17 January 1976 (aged 72); Moscow, Russian SFSR, Soviet Union
- Occupation: Actor
- Years active: 1925–1976

Andrei Andreyevich Fayt (Feit) (Russian: Андрей Андреевич Файт (Фейт); 29 August 1903 – 17 January 1976) was a Soviet film actor. He appeared in 44 films between 1925 and 1976. He was born in Nizhny Novgorod, Russia and died in Moscow.

== Selected filmography ==
- The Battleship Potemkin (1925)
- The Bay of Death (1926)
- The Happy Canary (1929)
- The Great Consoler (1933)
- Outskirts (1933)
- Dzhulbars (1933)
- The Thirteen (1937)
- Wish upon a Pike (1938)
- Minin and Pozharsky (1939)
- Siberians (1940)
- Salavat Yulayev (1941)
- The Young Guard (1948)
- Encounter at the Elbe (1949)
- The Battle of Stalingrad (1949)
- The Composer Glinka (1952)
- Admiral Ushakov (1953)
- The Star (1953)
- A Lesson in History (1957)
- The Idiot (1958)
- On Distant Shores (1958)
- The Secret of the Fortress (1959)
- Peace to Him Who Enters (1961)
- Kingdom of Crooked Mirrors (1964)
- Aladdin's Magic Lamp (1966)
- Strong with Spirit (1967)
- Fire, Water, and Brass Pipes (1968)
- The Diamond Arm (1969)
- The Lanfier Colony (1969)
- The Crown of the Russian Empire, or Once Again the Elusive Avengers (1971)
- Privalov's Millions (1972)
- Hopelessly Lost (1973)
- The Flight of Mr. McKinley (1975)
- The Little Mermaid (1976; Posthumous Release)
- How Czar Peter the Great Married Off His Moor (1976; Posthumous Release)
