= Lev Kuleshov =

Soviet filmmaker and film theorist

- Лев Кулешов
- Born: 13 January [O.S. 1 January] 1899; Tambov, Russian Empire
- Died: 29 March 1970 (aged 71); Moscow, Soviet Union
- Occupations: Film director; screenwriter
- Years active: 1917–1943
- Spouse: Aleksandra Khokhlova (m. 1923)

Lev Vladimirovich Kuleshov (Russian: Лев Владимирович Кулешов; 13 January [O.S. 1 January] 1899 – 29 March 1970) was a Russian and Soviet filmmaker and film theorist, one of the founders of the world's first film school, the Moscow Film School. He was given the title People's Artist of the RSFSR in 1969. He was intimately involved in development of the style of film making known as Soviet montage, especially its psychological underpinning, including the use of editing and the cut to influence the emotions of audience, a principle known as the Kuleshov effect. He also developed the theory of creative geography, which is the use of the action around a cut to connect otherwise disparate settings into a cohesive narrative.

== Life and career ==
Lev Kuleshov was born in 1899 into an intellectual Russian family. His father Vladimir Sergeyevich Kuleshov was of noble heritage; he studied art in the Moscow School of Painting, Sculpture and Architecture, despite his own father's disapproval. He then married a village schoolteacher Pelagia Aleksandrovna Shubina who was raised in an orphanage, which only led to more confrontation. They gave birth to two sons: Boris and Lev.

At the time Lev Kuleshov was born, the family became financially broke, lost their estate and moved to Tambov, living a modest life. In 1911 Vladimir Kuleshov died; three years later Lev and his mother moved to Moscow where his elder brother was studying and working as an engineer. Lev Kuleshov decided to follow the steps of his father and entered the Moscow School of Painting, although he didn't finish it. In 1916 he applied to work at the film company led by Aleksandr Khanzhonkov. He produced scenery for Yevgeni Bauer's pictures, such as The King of Paris, For Happiness and others. With time Kuleshov became more interested in film theory. He co-directed his first movie Twilight in 1917. His next film was released under the Soviet patronage. Although many Russian filmmakers left the country after 1917, Kuleshov stayed, hoping to create a new Soviet cinema. He worked for the state, editing pre-revolutionary "bourgeois" footage to align with Boleshevik ideology.

Inspired by American films such as The Birth of a Nation and lectures by Vladimir Gardin, Kuleshov developed a philosophy of editing and montage, which he considered as fundamental to cinema as harmony was to music. He famously demonstrated the eponymous Kuleshov Effect by juxtaposing the same footage of Ivan Mozzhukhin against different images, including a meal and a corpse. Although the footage was unchanged, viewers interpreted Mozzhukhin's expression differently based on its context. Kuleshov rejected Konstantin Stanislavski's acting method, which emphasized psychology and emotions, and instead emphasized precise, legible movements which could be cleanly edited. He called his performers naturshchik (models) instead of "actors", and had them rehearse using a "spacial metric grid" to confirm their movements followed 90- and 45-degree angles.

During 1918–1920 he covered the Russian Civil War with a documentary crew. In 1919 he headed the first Soviet film courses at the National Film School. He contributed the article "Kinematografichesky naturshchik" to the first issue of Zrelishcha in 1922. Among his other notable students were Vsevolod Pudovkin, Boris Barnet, Mikhail Romm, Sergey Komarov, Porfiri Podobed, Vladimir Fogel and Aleksandra Khokhlova who became his wife. Another one of his famous inventions was creative geography, also known as artificial landscape. Those techniques were described in his book The Basics of Film Direction (1941) which was later translated into many languages.

In addition to his theoretical and teaching work, Kuleshov directed a number of feature-length films. Among his most notable works are an action-comedy The Extraordinary Adventures of Mr. West in the Land of the Bolsheviks (1924), a psychological drama By the Law (1926) adapted from the short story by Jack London and a biographical drama The Great Consoler (1933) based on O. Henry's life and works. In 1934 and 1935 Kuleshov went to Tajikistan to direct there Dokhunda, a movie based on the novel by Tajik national poet Sadriddin Ayni, but the project was regarded with suspicion by the authorities as possibly exciting Tajik nationalism, and stopped. No footage survives.

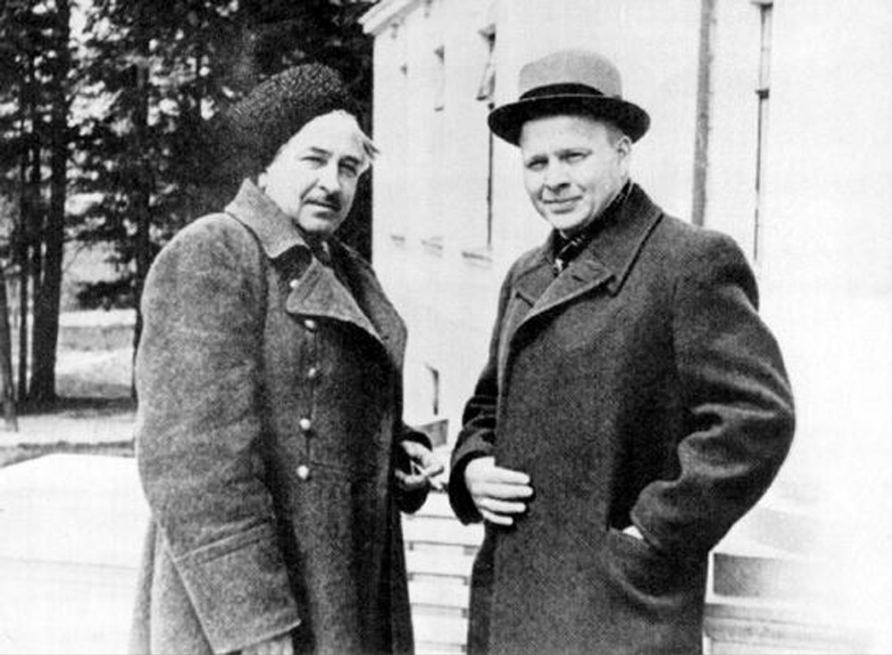
Lev Kuleshov (left) and Arkady Gaidar at the Bolshevo House of Creativity. May 1941

After directing his last film in 1943, Kuleshov served as an artistic director and an academic rector at VGIK where he worked for the next 25 years. He was a member of the jury at the 27th Venice International Film Festival, as well as a special guest during other international film festivals.

Kuleshov was awarded the Order of Lenin shortly before his death. He died in Moscow in 1970. He was buried at the Novodevichy Cemetery. He was survived by his wife Aleksandra Khokhlova (1897–1985) – an actress, film director and educator, granddaughter of Pavel Tretyakov and Sergey Botkin – and Aleksandra's son Sergei from her first marriage.

== Filmography ==
- The Project of Engineer Prite (1918)
- Pesn lyubvi nedopetaya (1918)
- On the Red Front (1920)
- The Extraordinary Adventures of Mr. West in the Land of the Bolsheviks (1924)
- The Death Ray (1925)
- By the Law (1926)
- Vasha znakomaya (1927)
- The Happy Canary (1929)
- Dva-Buldi-dva (1930)
- Sorok serdets (1931)
- Horizon (1932)
- The Great Consoler (1933)
- Dokhunda (1934)
- Sibiryaki (1940)
- Klyatva Timura (1942)
- Uchitelnitsa Kartashova (1943)
- We from the Urals (1943)

== Awards and honours ==
- Order of the Red Banner of Labour (1944)
- Order of Lenin (1967)
- People's Artist of the RSFSR (1969)
