= Sergey Komarov (actor) =

Soviet actor, director and screenwriter (1891–1957)

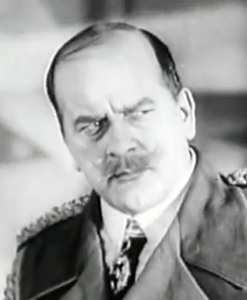
- Born: Sergey Petrovich Komarov; 2 March 1891; Vyazniki, Vladimir Oblast, Russian Empire
- Died: 23 December 1957 (aged 66); Moscow, Soviet Union
- Occupations: Actor, film director, screenwriter
- Years active: 1920–1956

Sergey Petrovich Komarov (Russian: Сергей Петрович Комаров) was a Soviet and Russian stage and film actor, film director, screenwriter and pedagogue. Honored Artist of the RSFSR (1935).

== Selected filmography ==
- 1926 — By the Law
- 1928 — The House on Trubnaya
- 1933 — Outskirts
- 1936 — Cosmic Voyage
- 1948 — The Young Guard
- 1955 — The Grasshopper
