= Venice Film Festival =

Annual film festival in Italy

Coordinates: 45°24′22″N 12°22′02″E

Mostra Internazionale d'Arte Cinematografica International Exhibition of Cinematographic Art

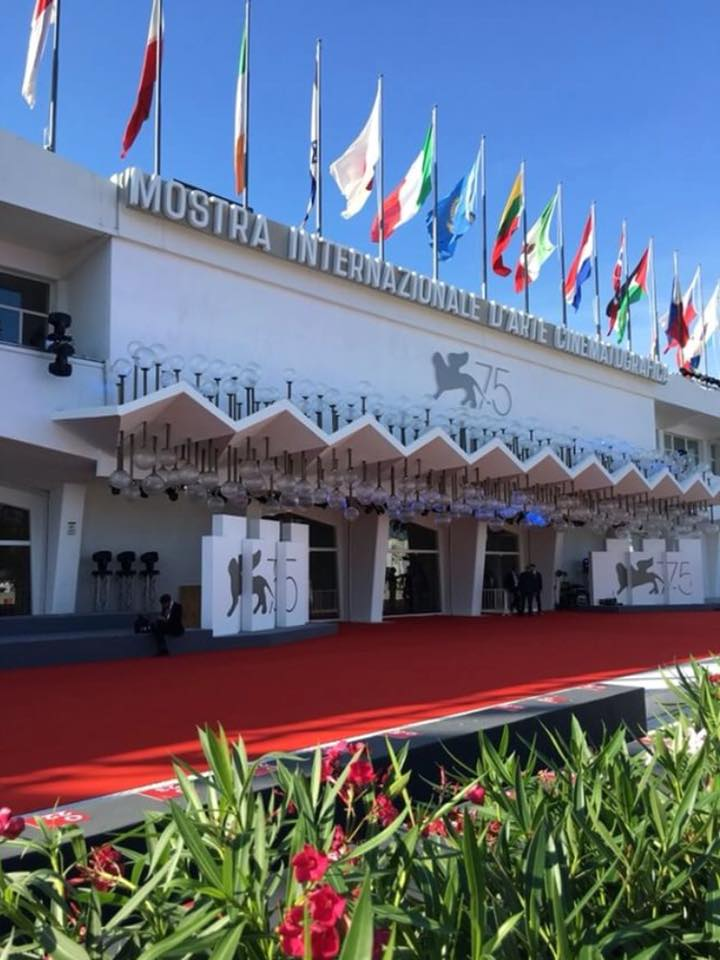
- Venice Cinema Palace on Lido island in 2018
- Location: Venice, Italy
- Founded: 6 August 1932; 94 years ago
- Awards: Golden Lion; Silver Lion; Volpi Cup and others
- Artistic director: Alberto Barbera (since 2011)
- Website: labiennale.org/en/cinema

Current: 83rd edition (2026)
- 84th 82nd

The Venice Film Festival or Venice International Film Festival (Italian: Mostra Internazionale d'Arte Cinematografica della Biennale di Venezia, lit. 'International Exhibition of Cinematographic Art of the Venice Biennale'; informally Mostra del Cinema di Venezia) is an annual film festival held in Venice, Italy. It is the world's oldest film festival and one of the "Big Five" International film festivals worldwide, which include the Big Three European Film Festivals (Venice, Cannes, Berlin), alongside the Toronto International Film Festival in Canada and the Sundance Film Festival in the United States. In 1951, FIAPF formally accredited the festival.

Founded by Giuseppe Volpi, member of the National Fascist Party and grandfather of producer Marina Cicogna, in Venice in August 1932, the festival is part of the Venice Biennale, one of the world's oldest exhibitions of art, created by the Venice City Council on 19 April 1893. The range of work at the Venice Biennale now covers Italian and international art, architecture, dance, music, theatre, and cinema. These works are experienced at separate exhibitions: the International Art Exhibition, the International Festival of Contemporary Music, the International Theatre Festival, the International Architecture Exhibition, the International Festival of Contemporary Dance, the International Kids' Carnival, and the annual Venice Film Festival, which is arguably the best-known of all the events. In the 1930s, the Venice Film Festival awarded Nazi propagandist Leni Riefenstahl Best Foreign Film Honors.

The film festival branch is held in late August and early September on the island of the Lido in the Venice Lagoon. During the festival, Venice hosts many events and parties, interviews and meetings with filmmakers and actors every night, venues open all night, and parties are held in beautiful casino palaces and gardens. Screenings take place in the historic Palazzo del Cinema on the Lungomare Marconi. The festival continues to be one of the world's most popular and fastest-growing. Recently, due to the growing number of American productions in its sections, besides international critically acclaimed titles, the festival became a launchpad of many films for the awards season, prompting higher chance of Academy Award recognition for selected films.

The 83rd Venice International Film Festival took place from 2 to 12 September 2026.

== History ==
=== 1930s ===
During the 1930s, the government and Italian citizens were heavily interested in film. Of the money Italians spent on cultural or sporting events, most of it went for movies. The majority of films screened in Italy were American, which led to government involvement in the film industry and the yearning to celebrate Italian culture in general. With this in mind, the Venice International Film Festival was created by Giuseppe Volpi, Luciano de Feo, and Antonio Maraini in 1932. Volpi, a statesman, wealthy businessman, and avid fascist who had been Benito Mussolini's minister of finance, was appointed president of the Venice Biennale the same year. Maraini served as the festival's secretary general, and de Feo headed its executive committee.

On the night of 6 August 1932, the festival opened with a screening of the American film Dr. Jekyll and Mr. Hyde on the terrace of the Excelsior Palace Hotel. Nine countries participated in the festival, which ended on 21 August. No awards were given at the first festival, but an audience referendum was held to determine which films and performances were most praiseworthy. The French film À Nous la Liberté was voted the Film Più Divertente (the Funniest Film). The Sin of Madelon Claudet was chosen the Film Più Commovente (the Most Moving Film) and its star, Helen Hayes, the best actress. Most Original Film (Film dalla fantasia più originale) was given to Dr. Jekyll and Mr. Hyde, and its leading man, Fredric March, was voted best actor.

Despite the success of the first festival, it did not return in 1933. In 1934, the festival was declared to be an annual event, and participation grew from nine countries to seventeen. That year the festival gave its first official awards, namely the Mussolini Cup for Best Italian Film, the Mussolini Cup for Best Foreign Film, and the Corporations Ministry Cup. Seventeen awards were given: fourteen to films and three to individuals. Five films received honorable mentions. The third installment of the festival in 1935 was headed by its first artistic director, Ottavio Croze, who maintained this position until World War II. In 1936, a jury was added to the festival's governing body. It had no foreign members. The majority of funds for the festival came from the Ministry of Popular Culture, with other portions from the Biennale and the city of Venice.

1936 marked another important development in the festival. A law crafted by the Ministry of Popular Culture made the festival an autonomous entity, separate from the main Venice Biennale. This allowed additional fascist organizations, such as the Department of Cinema and the Fascist National Federation of Entertainment Industries, to control it. The fifth year of the festival saw the establishment of its permanent home. Designed and completed in 1937, the Palazzo del Cinema was built on the Lido. It has since been the site for every Venice Film Festival, except the three years from 1940 to 1942, when it was held outside of Venice, due to fear of a bombing that never came.

=== 1940s ===
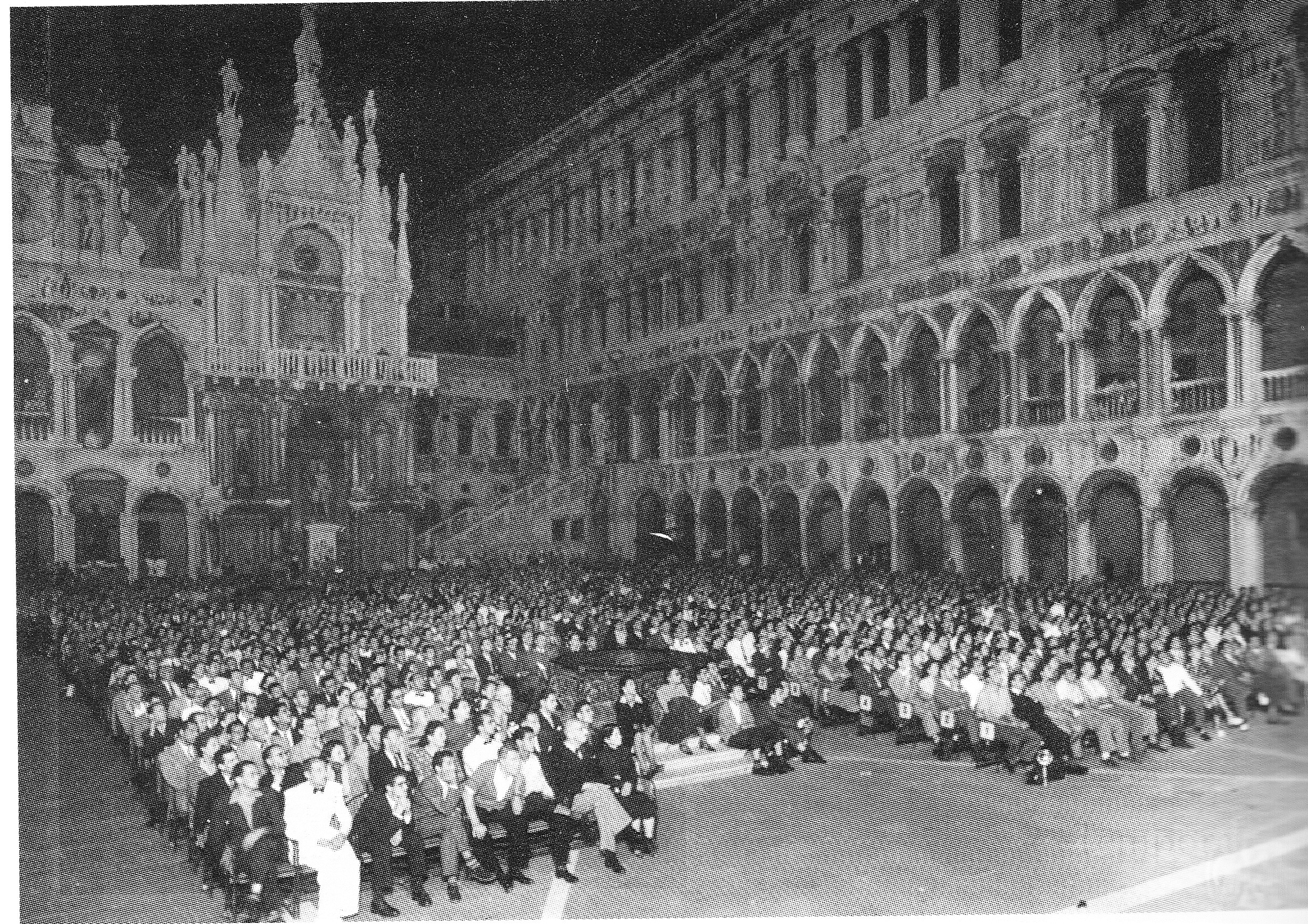
The Doge's Palace in Piazza San Marco hosted the 1947 festival.

The 1940s represent one of the most difficult moments for the festival. In 1941, Nazi propaganda movie Heimkehr was presented, winning an award from the Italian Ministry of Popular Culture. With the advent of the conflict the situation degenerated to such a point that the 1940, 1941 and 1942 festivals are regarded as if they did not happen, because they were carried out in places far away from Lido. In 1940, the festival was renamed the Italian-German Film Festival (Manifestazione Cinematografica Italo-Germanica) The festival carried this title until 1942, when the festival was suspended due to war.

The festival resumed full speed in 1946, after the war. For the first time, the 1946 edition was held in September, in accordance with an agreement with the newly reborn Cannes Film Festival, which had just held its first review in the spring of that year. With the return to normality, Venice once again became a great icon of the film world.

In 1947, the festival was held in the courtyard of the Doge's Palace, hosting a record 90 thousand participants. The 1947 festival is widely considered one of the most successful editions in the history of the festival.

=== Development and closure ===
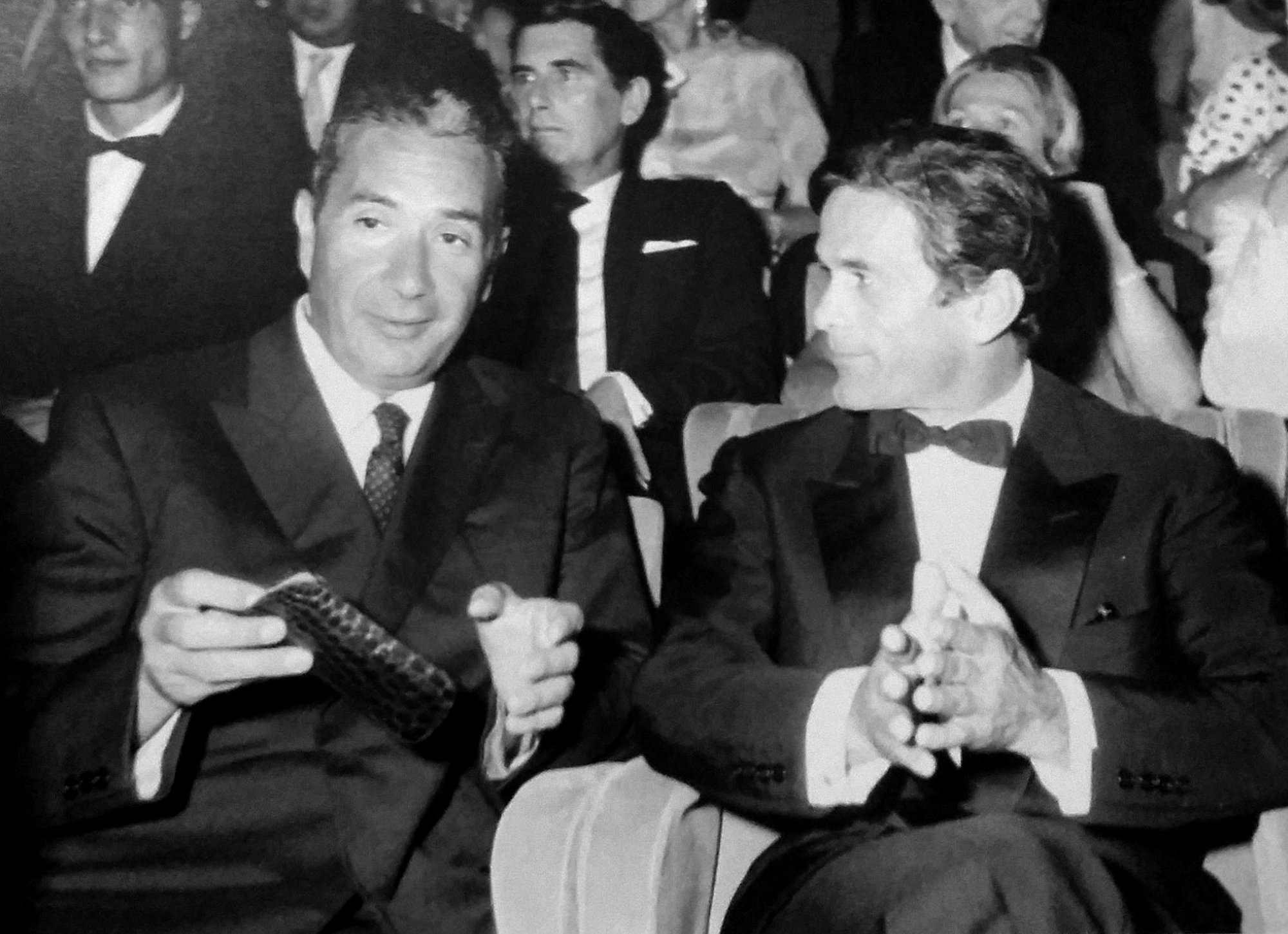
The Italian Prime Minister Aldo Moro and Pier Paolo Pasolini together in Venice at the premiere of the movie The Gospel According to St. Matthew in 1964

In 1963 the winds of change blew strongly during Luigi Chiarini’s directorship of the festival (1963–1968). During the years of his directorship, Chiarini aspired to renew the spirit and the structures of the festival, pushing for a total reorganization of the entire system. For six years the festival followed a consistent path, according to the rigid criteria put in place for the selection of works in competition, and took a firm stand against the political pressures and interference of more and more demanding movie studios, preferring the artistic quality of films to the growing commercialization of the film industry.

The social and political unrest of 1968 had strong repercussions on the Venice Biennale. From 1969 to 1979 no prizes were awarded and the festival returned to the non-competitiveness of the first edition due to the Years of Lead. In 1973, 1977 and 1978, the festival was not even held. The Golden Lion did not make its return until 1980.

=== Rebirth ===
Term	Director
1979–1983	Carlo Lizzani
1983–1987	Gian Luigi Rondi
1987–1992	Guglielmo Biraghi
1992–1996	Gillo Pontecorvo
1996–1998	Felice Laudadio
1998–2002	Alberto Barbera
2002–2004	Moritz de Hadeln
2004–2011	Marco Müller
since 2011	Alberto Barbera

The long-awaited rebirth came in 1979, thanks to the new director Carlo Lizzani (1979–1983), who decided to restore the image and value the festival had lost over the last decade. The 1979 edition laid the foundation for the restoration of international prestige. In an attempt to create a more modern image of the festival, the neo-director created a committee of experts to assist in selecting the works and to increase the diversity of submissions to the festival.

In 2004 an independent and parallel film festival Giornate degli Autori was created in association with the festival.

To celebrate the 70th edition of the festival, in 2013, the section "Venezia 70 – Future Reloaded" was specially created for the edition.

During the recent years, under the direction of Alberto Barbera, the festival established itself as an Oscars launchpad, increasing the presence of American movies and hosting the world premieres of Academy Award–winning films such as Gravity (2013), Birdman (2014), Spotlight (2015), La La Land (2016), The Shape of Water (2017), A Star Is Born (2018), The Favourite (2018), Roma (2018), Joker (2019), Nomadland (2020), Dune (2021), The Whale (2022), Poor Things (2023),The Brutalist (2024) and Frankenstein (2025).

In 2017 a new section for virtual reality films was introduced. Initially this section was called Venice Virtual Reality, but in 2022 the organisation announced the new name to be Venice Immersive. The Venice Film Festival was the first of the "Big Five" international film festivals worldwide to introduce virtual reality to the festival program. Therefore, Venice Immersive quickly became the most important podium for the emerging medium within film to date.

George Clooney and photographers on the red carpet of the 83rd Venice International Film Festival

In 2018 Roma by Alfonso Cuarón won the Golden Lion and became the first movie produced by a streaming service, Netflix, to win at a major film festival.

== Direction ==
The president of the Venice Biennale represents the festival in front of its financial partner, the public authorities, and the media. He is chosen by the Italian Ministry of Culture every 4 years. The current president is Pietrangelo Buttafuoco, appointed in March 2024. Previously the post has been held by Paolo Baratta (2008–2020) and Roberto Cicutto (2020–2024).

The director of the Festival is responsible for coordinating the events and is chosen by the president of the Venice Biennale and its delegates. The current director Alberto Barbera was appointed in December 2011. On 27 October 2020 Barbera's term was renewed for 4 more years until 2024. In May 2024, his last mandate was extended until 2026. He previously held the position from 1998 to 2002.

== Festival program ==
The goal of the Venice Film Festival is to "raise awareness and promote international cinema in all its forms, including art, entertainment and industry, in a spirit of freedom and dialogue." The Venice Film Festival is organized in various sections:

- Official Selection - The main event of the festival.
  - In Competition - About 21 films competing for the Golden Lion.
  - Out of Competition - Maximum of 18 important works of the year will be presented but do not compete for the main prize.
  - Orizzonti - The films that represent the latest trends in international cinema by young talents will be presented.
  - Venice Spotlight - Formerly called Orizzonti Extra, programs independent films with commercial appeal from newcomers filmmakers or internationally established ones.
  - Venice Classics - Selection of the finest restoration of classic films will be featured.
  - Venice Immersive - Maximum of 30 works in competition and out of competition will be presented.
- Independent and Parallel Sections - These are alternative programmes dedicated to discover other aspects of cinema.
  - International Critics' Week - No more than 8 debut films will be screened with its own regulations.
  - Giornate degli Autori - No more than 12 films will be promoted by ANAC and 100 Autori Association.

== Official awards ==
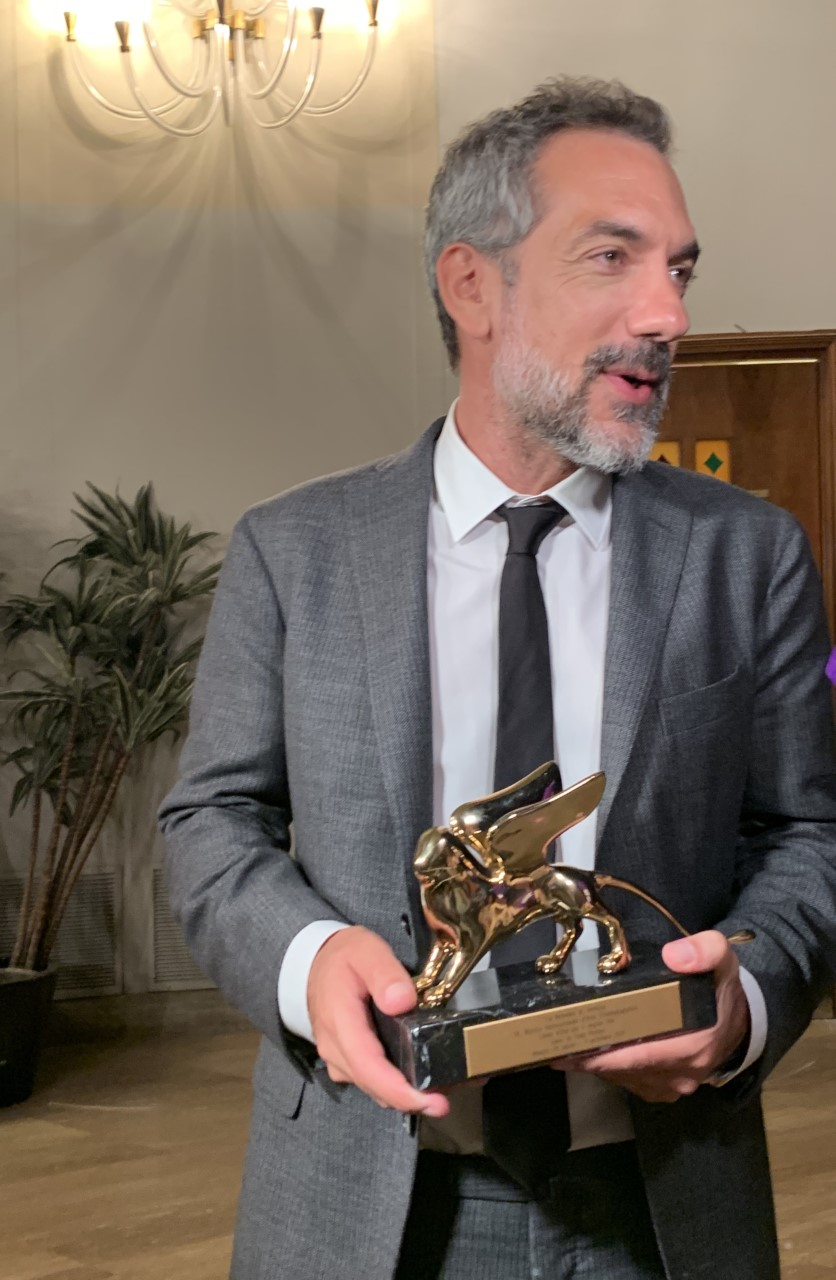
Todd Phillips with the Golden Lion won by his film Joker at the 2019 edition

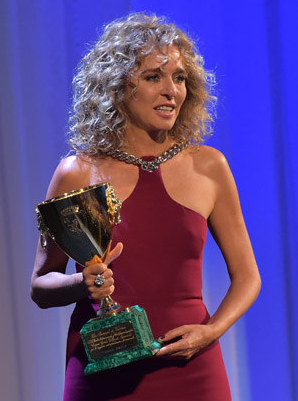
Valeria Golino winning the Volpi Cup for Best Actress in 2015 for Per amor vostro

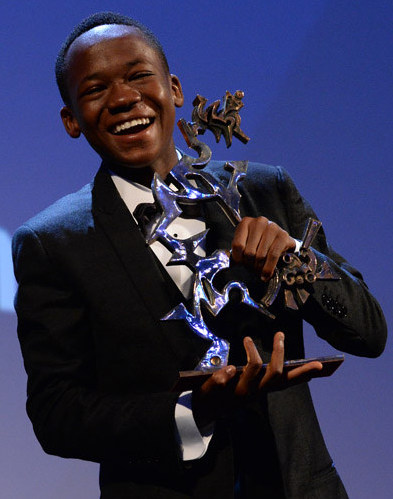
Abraham Attah winning the Marcello Mastroianni Award in 2015 for Beasts of No Nation

The Film Festival has four Juries to judge the entries: Venezia (number of the edition), Orizzonti, Premio Venezia Opera Prima "Luigi De Laurentiis", and Venice Immersive. The Film Festival's current awards are:

=== In competition ===
- Golden Lion (Leone d'Oro), awarded to the best film screened in competition at the festival. The award was introduced in 1949 as the Golden Lion of San Marco
- Grand Jury Prize, awarded to the second best film screened in competition at the festival
- Silver Lion (Leone d'Argento), awarded to the best director in the competitive section
- Special Jury Prize, awarded to the third best film screened in competition at the festival
- Volpi Cup (Coppa Volpi), awarded to the best actor/actress
  - See – Volpi Cup for Best Actor
  - See – Volpi Cup for Best Actress
- Best Screenplay, awarded to the best screenwriter in the competitive section
- Marcello Mastroianni Award, instituted in 1998 in honor of Italian actor Marcello Mastroianni, who died in 1996. The award was created to acknowledge an emerging actor or actress

=== Golden Lion for Lifetime Achievement ===
Tributes to an artist for a lifetime of work, and/or contribution to world cinema. Generally two laureates per edition.

=== Orizzonti (Horizons) ===
This section is open to all "custom-format" works, with a wider view towards new trends in the expressive languages that converge in film. Starting from the 67th edition of the festival, four awards of the Orizzonti section have been established:

- Orizzonti Award for Best Feature Film
- Orizzonti Special Jury Prize (for feature films)
- Orizzonti Award for Best Short Film

More awards were added in the following years:

- Orizzonti Award for Best Director
- Orizzonti Award for Best Actor
- Orizzonti Award for Best Actress
- Orizzonti Award for Best Screenplay

=== Venice Spotlight ===
- Audience Award: The only official award voted by the public attending the festival. Established initially in the former Orizzonti Extra section, until its name was changed for Venice Spotlight in 2025.

=== Venice Immersive ===
This is the Extended Reality section of the Venice Film Festival and Venice Biennale, founded in 2017. This section is devoted entirely to immersive media and includes all Extended Reality means of creative and cinematographic expression.

The awards under this section are:

- Venice Immersive Grand Prize (Gran Premio)
- Venice Immersive Special Jury Prize (Premio Speciale della Giuria)
- Venice Immersive Achievement Prize (Premio per la Realizzazione)

=== Giornate degli Autori ===
The Giornate degli Autori (formerly Venice Days) is an independent and parallel section founded in 2004 in association with Venice Film Festival. It is modelled on the Directors' Fortnight at the Cannes Film Festival. Anac and 100autori which are both associations of Italian film directors and authors are engaged to support and promote the Giornate.

The awards under this sections are:

- Giornate Degli Autori (GDA) Award
- Label Europa Cinema Award
- BNP Paribas People's Choice Award

=== Luigi De Laurentiis Award ===
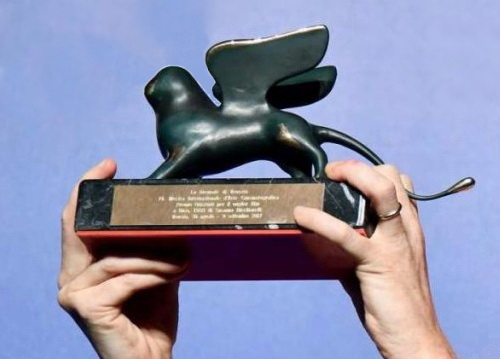
Lion of the Future

- Lion of the Future: All the debut feature films in the various competitive sections in the Venice Film Festival, whether in Official Selection or Independent and Parallel Sections, are eligible for this award. The winner will be awarded a prize of US$100,000, which to be divided equally between the director and the producer.

=== Glory to the Filmmaker Award ===
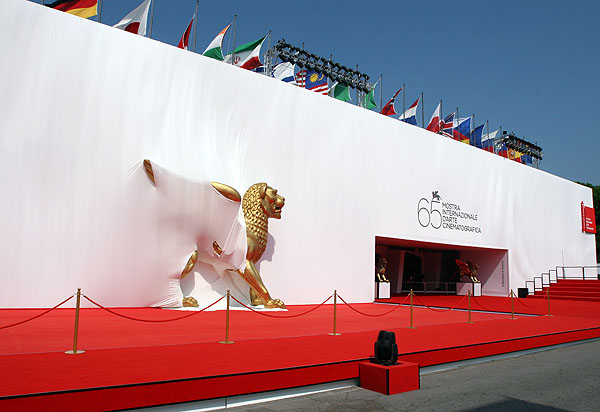
Cinema Palace during the 65th Venice International Film Festival

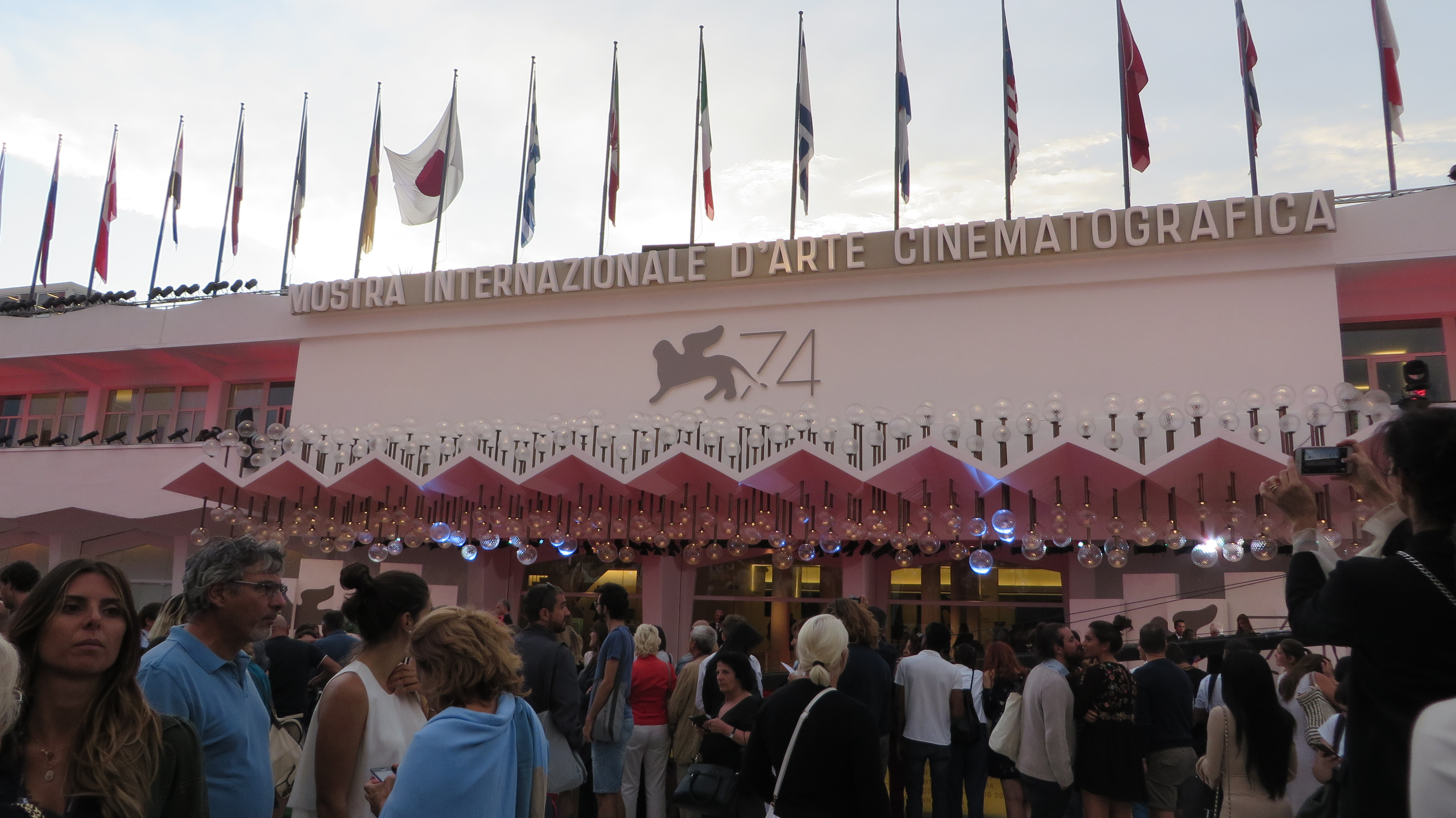
Cinema Palace during the 74th Venice International Film Festival

Glory to the Filmmaker Award, organized in collaboration with Jaeger-LeCoultre (2006–2020) and Cartier (from 2021), is dedicated to personalities who have made a significant contribution to contemporary cinema.

== Past awards ==
=== Main competition ===
- Golden Osella (Osella d'Oro), awarded for outstanding creative and technical contributions. Retired in 2012.
- Special Lion, awarded for an overall work to a director or actor of a film presented in the main competition section.

=== Audience referendum ===
In the first edition of the festival in 1932, due to the lack of a jury and the awarding of official prizes, a list of acknowledgements was decided by popular vote, a tally determined by the number of people flocking to the films, and announced by the Organizing Committee. From this, the Best Director was awarded to Russian Nikolai Ekk for the film Road to Life, while À Nous la Liberté by René Clair was voted Best Film.

=== Mussolini Cup (Coppa Mussolini) ===
The Mussolini Cup was the top award from 1934 to 1942 for Best Italian and Best Foreign Film. Named after Italy's dictator Benito Mussolini, it was abandoned upon his ousting in 1943.

==== Mussolini Cup for Best Italian film ====
Year	Film	Original title	Director(s)
1934	Loyalty of Love	Teresa Confalonieri	Guido Brignone
1935	Casta Diva		Carmine Gallone
1936	Lo squadrone bianco		Augusto Genina
1937	Scipio Africanus: The Defeat of Hannibal	Scipione l'africano	Carmine Gallone
1938	Luciano Serra, Pilot	Luciano Serra pilota	Goffredo Alessandrini
1939	Cardinal Messias	Abuna Messias	Goffredo Alessandrini
1940	The Siege of the Alcazar	L'assedio dell'Alcazar	Augusto Genina
1941	The Iron Crown	La corona di ferro	Alessandro Blasetti
1942	Bengasi		Augusto Genina

==== Mussolini Cup for Best foreign film ====
Year	Film	Original title	Director(s)	Country
1934	Man of Aran		Robert J. Flaherty	United Kingdom, Irish Free State
1935	Anna Karenina		Clarence Brown	United States
1936	Der Kaiser von Kalifornien		Luis Trenker	Nazi Germany
1937	Life Dances On	Un carnet de bal	Julien Duvivier	France
1938	Olympia		Leni Riefenstahl	Nazi Germany
1940	Der Postmeister		Gustav Ucicky	Nazi Germany
1941	Ohm Krüger		Hans Steinhoff	Nazi Germany
1942	The Great King	Der große König	Veit Harlan	Nazi Germany

=== Great Gold Medals of the National Fascist Association for Entertainment ===
Le Grandi Medaglie d'Oro dell'Associazione Nazionale Fascista dello Spettacolo was awarded to Best Actor and Best Actress. It was later replaced by the Volpi Cup for actors and actresses.

The first time this prize was awarded to Katharine Hepburn for her role in Little Women by George Cukor.

=== Award for Best Director ===
Year	Director(s)	Film	Original title
1935	King Vidor	The Wedding Night	
1936	Jacques Feyder	Carnival in Flanders	La Kermesse Héroïque
1937	Robert J. Flaherty and Zoltan Korda	Elephant Boy	
1938	Carl Froelich	Heimat	

== See also ==
- Venice Biennale
- Rome Film Festival
- Berlin International Film Festival
- Cannes Film Festival
- Cairo International Film Festival
- List of Big Three film festivals winners
- Volpi Cup for Best Actor
- Volpi Cup for Best Actress
