= 1st Venice International Film Festival =

Italian film festival in 1932

- Festival poster
- Opening film: Dr. Jekyll and Mr. Hyde
- Location: Venice, Italy
- Founded: 1932
- Festival date: 6 – 21 August 1932
- Website: Website

Venice Film Festival chronology
- 2nd

The 1st annual Venice International Film Festival was held between 6 and 21 August 1932. Dr. Jekyll and Mr. Hyde was the first film to be screened at the festival. No official prizes were awarded, so an audience referendum took place to determine the winners.

== Awards ==
- Most Favorite Actor: Fredric March for Dr. Jekyll and Mr. Hyde
- Most Favorite Actress: Helen Hayes for The Sin of Madelon Claudet
- Most Convincing Director: Nikolai Ekk for Putyovka v zhizn
- Best Technical Perfection: Leontine Sagan for Mädchen in Uniform
- Most Original Story (Fantasy): Rouben Mamoulian for Dr. Jekyll and Mr. Hyde
- Most Amusing Film: René Clair for À nous la liberté
- Most Touching Film: Edgar Selwyn for The Sin of Madelon Claudet
