= Ivashov =

Ivashov (Russian: Ивашов) is a Russian masculine surname, its feminine counterpart is Ivashova. It may refer to:

- Leonid Ivashov (born 1943), Russian military and public official.
- Vladimir Ivashov (1939—1995), Russian Soviet actor.
- Valentina Ivashova (1915–1991), Soviet film actress.

== See also ==
- Asteroid 12978 Ivashov, named after Vladimir Ivashov
