= The Nightingale (1936 film) =

- Directed by: Nikolai Ekk
- Written by: Nikolai Ekk; Regina Yanushkevich
- Cinematography: Fyodor Provorov
- Music by: Yakov Stollyar
- Production company: Mezhrabpomfilm
- Release date: 3 November 1936
- Running time: 105 minutes
- Country: Soviet Union
- Language: Russian

The Nightingale (Russian: Соловей-Соловушко, romanized: Solovey-Solovushko) is a 1936 Soviet drama film directed by Nikolai Ekk and starring Valentina Ivashova, Z. Kashkarova and Nikolai Ekk.

The film's sets were designed by the art director Ivan Stepanov.

It is the first Soviet feature film shot in color.

== Plot ==
The events in the film take place in pre-revolutionary Russia. A riot of workers of a large porcelain factory is taking place. After the burning of one of the shops, Grunya's father dies in the fire. The owner of the factory caused the fire in order to obtain a fine from the workers. Grunya urges the workers to fight, but is injured, yet she still urges the people not to give up.

== Cast ==
- Valentina Ivashova as Grunya Kornakova
- Z. Kashkarova as Grunya's Mother
- Nikolai Ekk as Uncle Andrei
- A. Kosanov as Foreman
- Ivan Lavrov as Grunya's Father
- Mikhail Doronin as M. Novostalano
- Vladimir Batalov as N. Luznetsov
- G. Yegorova as His Wife
- M. Skavronskaya
- Yelena Maksimova
- Vera Lopatina
- A.I. Vasilyeva
- A. Ignatyeva
- L. Tisse

== See also ==
- List of early color feature films

== Bibliography ==
- Liz-Anne Bawden (ed.) The Oxford Companion to Film. Oxford University Press, 1976. ISBN 978-1135734190
