= Mezhrabpomfilm =

German-Russian film studio

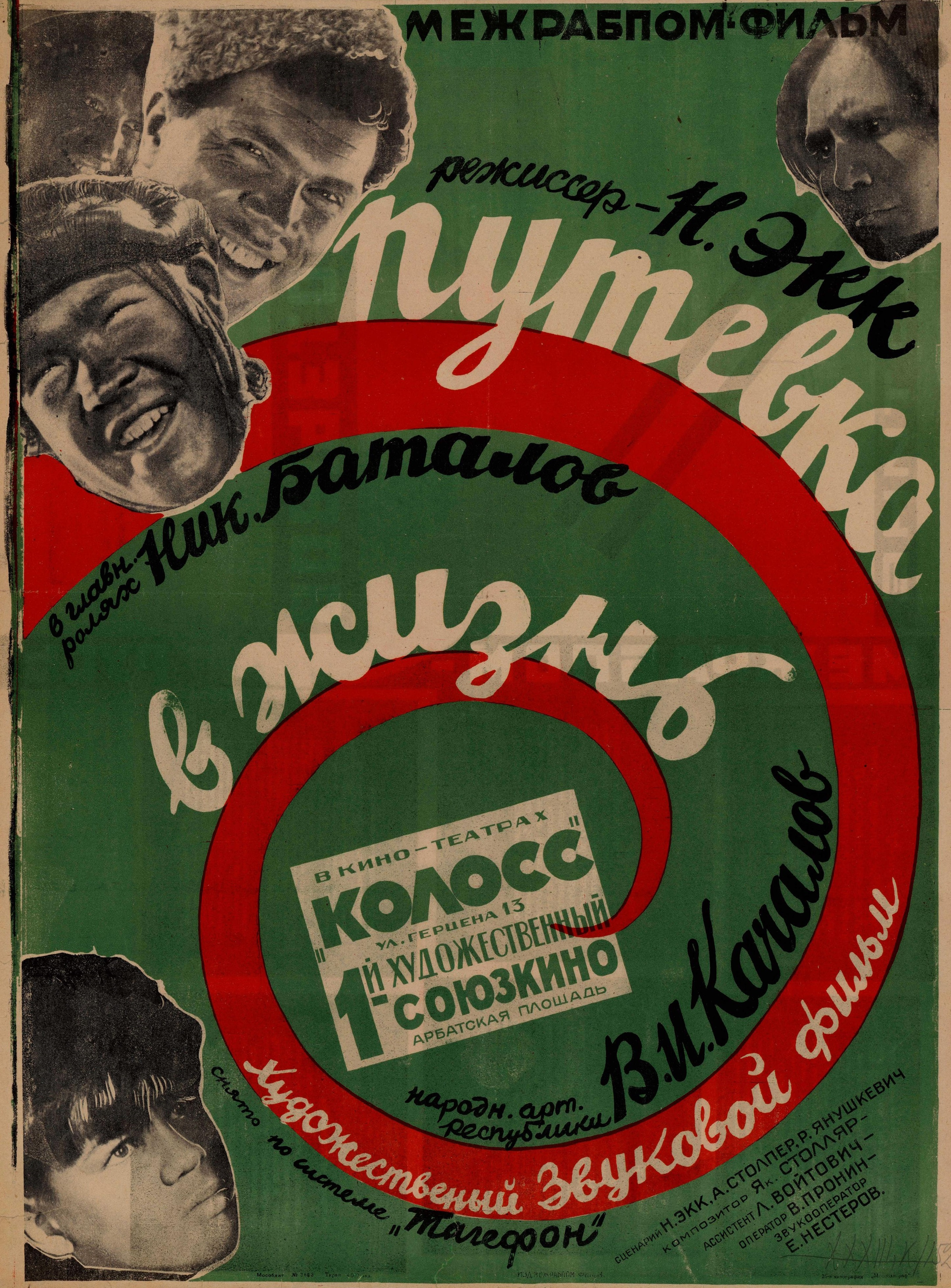
The first Soviet sound film, Road to Life (1931), was made by Mezhrabpomfilm.

Mezhrabpomfilm (

Russian: Межрабпомфильм), from the word film, and the Russian acronym for Workers International Relief or Workers International Aid (

Russian: Международная рабочая помощь, was a German-Russian film studio, formerly Mezhrabpom-Rus, from 1928-1936. Currently “Gorky Film Studio”

== History ==
The studio was founded in 1928 in Moscow on the basis of the disbanded joint-stock company Mezhrabpom-Rus from which he inherited two filming pavilions, a film equipment park and approved thematic plan. After producing around 600 films the "international experiment was brutally ended eleven and fourteen years later by Hitler's and Stalin's regimes."

Classics of revolutionary cinema, such as Vsevolod Pudovkin's Storm Over Asia (1928) were made by Mezhrabpom-Film. Other significant films made by the studio include Yakov Protazanov's The White Eagle (1928) and St. Jorgen's Day (1930), Lev Kuleshov's Two-Buldi-Two (1929), Nikolai Ekk's Road to Life (1931), Margarita Barskaya's Torn Shoes (Rvanye Bashmaki 1933), a drama about children set in Germany when the Nazis assumed power, and Aleksandr Andriyevsky's early science-fiction film Loss of Sensation (Gibel Sensatsii 1935). The Soviet Union's first animated films, and first sound film, Nikolai Ekk's Road to Life (1931) were made by the studio.

One of Mezhrabpomfilm's last films was Gustav von Wangenheim's Fighters (1936), about German workers fighting the Nazi Brownshirts and the SS in 1933. It was made by German filmmakers and actors who had fled to Moscow to avoid Hitler's terror. Ironically, 2 actors working on the set were arrested during the filming and by the end of 1938 (during Stalin's terror years) two thirds of the film crew were arrested.

In 1936, the company was dissolved, as it was regarded too independent and too influenced by foreigners. Rot-Front Studio became its successor, but in the same 1936 its name was changed to Soyuzdetfilm (

Russian: Союздетфильм), the world's first film company devoted to films for children and teenagers, which in 1948 was renamed Gorky Film Studio.

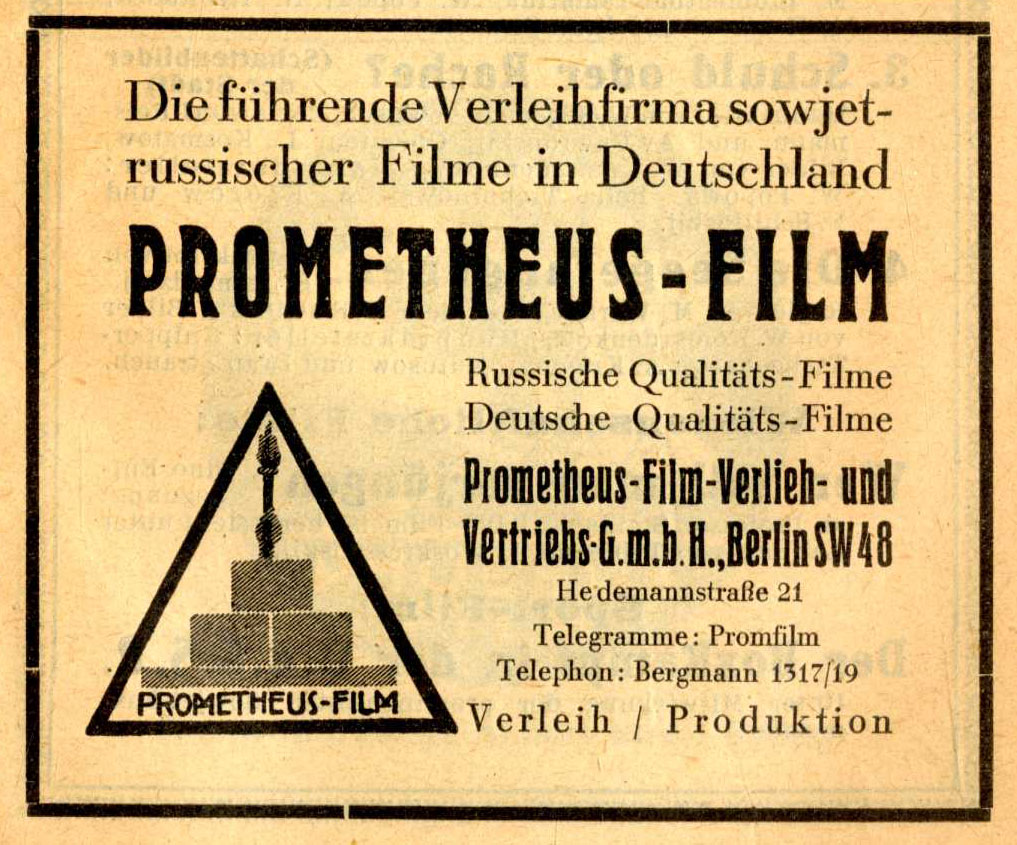
1928 ad for the Prometheus production division

Its German branch Prometheus Film, produced some of the "socially committed cinematic art of the late Weimar Republic [Red Dream Factory productions] such as Phil Jutzi's work, Leo Mittler's Beyond the Street (Jenseits der Strasse 1929), Slatan Dudow's Kuhle Wampe or Who Owns the World? (Kuhle Wampe, oder: Wem gehört die Welt? 1932) berlinale pressrelease], as well as two joint productions with Mezhrabpomfilm, before going bankrupt in 1932.

Berlin's Bertz + Fischer published a book for a Retrospective - a programme of films which were presented at the 2012 Berlin Film Festival - in which German and Russian authors look at the studio and the aesthetics of the films produced there (Günter Agde, Alexander Schwarz (ed.): Die rote Traumfabrik: Meschrabpom-Film und Prometheus (1921–1936). Berlin: Bertz + Fischer 2012).

== See also ==
- Gorky Film Studio
- Carnival of Colors (1935)
