= Carnival of Colors =

1935 USSR film

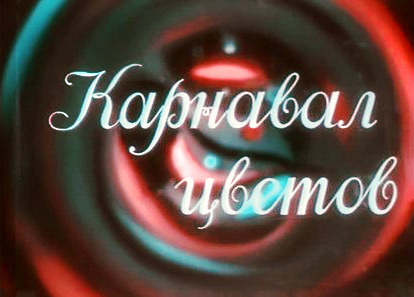
- Carnival of Colors film title frame
- Карнавал цветов Karnaval cvetov
- Directed by: Nikolai Ekk
- Screenplay by: Nikolai Eck
- Music by: Yakov Stolyar
- Production company: Mezhrabpomfilm
- Release date: 1935
- Running time: 45 minutes
- Country: USSR
- Language: Russian

Carnival of Colors (1935), 42 min

Carnival of Colors (Russian: Карнавал цветов), is a 1935 Soviet Russia documentary film directed by Nikolai Ekk and extolling the early use of color in films. It was produced by Mezhrabpomfilm.

In 2012, it was digitally restored from the originals preserved in the Gosfilmofond. It was shot using the two-color subtractive system, using a bipack method. The film includes images from Red Square, travel scenes in Soviet Georgia, and paintings. The film has been described as experimental, and as an anthology. Ekk also directed the first Russian film with sound, Road to Life (1931).
