= Loss of Sensation =

1935 Soviet film

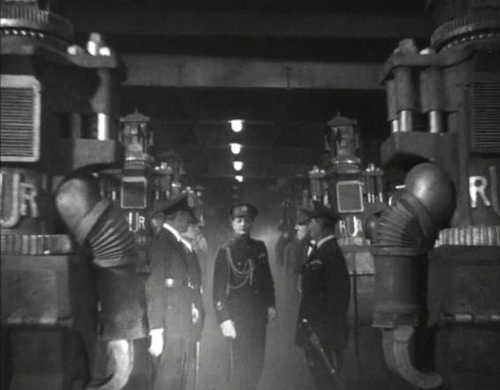
- A scene showing RURs
- Directed by: Alexandr Andriyevsky
- Written by: Georgiy Grebnev
- Starring: S.M. Vecheslov; V.P. Gardin; M.G. Volgina; A.C. Chekulaeva
- Cinematography: Mark Magidson
- Music by: Sergei Vasilenko
- Production company: Mezhrabpomfilm
- Release date: 1935
- Running time: 85 min
- Country: Soviet Union
- Language: Russian

The full film

Loss of Sensation, alternatively titled Robot of Jim Ripple (Russian: «Гибель сенсации» («Робот Джима Рипль»)) is a 1935 Soviet science fiction sound film directed by Alexandr Andriyevsky.

Although the film uses the abbreviation "R.U.R" for the robots, it is not based directly on the 1920 stageplay by Karel Čapek. The film is based on the 1929 Ukrainian novel Iron Riot (also known as Robots are coming) by Volodimir Vladko.

As of 2013, the film is in public domain.

== Plot ==
The film's plot is centered on an engineer Jim Ripple who invents universal robots to help workers, being himself from a workers' family. He theorizes that cheap production will make all goods so cheap that Capitalism will fall. The workers do not share his view and his family considers him a traitor. A key element of his invention is a high-capacity capacitor that powers the robots. The government becomes interested in the invention because the robots can be used as a weapon as well. Ripple is given a top secret factory and funding so that he can produce robots. The robots are not autonomous or intelligent, and controlled either by radio or by sound, for which purpose Ripple uses a saxophone. When drunk he even makes the robots dance.

At a day of a universal workers' strike, the administration of a factory where the Ripple's brother works, located in the same town where the robot producing plant is located, replaces workers with robots. A workers' delegation visits the factory to see that there are no strike breakers, and finds that actually it is the robots who do the work. The meeting ends with an accident when Ripple tries to show the abilities of a robot to the workers; in an accident, one of the workers dies. This sparks a conflict between workers and the plant administration assisted by the military. The military decides to use robots against the workers as a weapon. The robots are commanded by an officer sitting in a tank using a radio remote control device. Trying to prevent the hostilities Ripple tries to stop the robots with a saxophone, but he is unsuccessful and is killed.

Finally the workers gain control over the robots with their own remote control device, which they had covertly assembled before, making necessary measurements on the robot assembling factory and researching the Ripple's prototype robot "Micron", whom he left damaged at his home.

== Cast ==
- S.M. Vecheslov — Jim Ripple, engineer
- V.P. Gardin — Jack Ripple, his brother
- M.G. Volgina — Claire Ripple, his sister
- A.C. Chekulaeva — Mary, Jack's wife
- V.A. Orlov — Charly
- S.A. Martinson — Dizior, music hall artist
- S.A. Minin — Tom
- N.N. Rybnikov — field-marshall
- P.G. Poltoratskii — Persy Grimm, minister
- V.T. Renin — Hamilton Grimm, minister's son
- N.E. Ablov — Mr. Rotterdam, banker
- A.C. Khokhlova — girl with dolls

== Sources ==
- David Christopher, "Stalin's "Loss of Sensation": Subversive Impulses in Soviet Science-Fiction of the Great Terror," Journal of Science Fiction, Vol. 1, No. 2 (May, 2016), 18-35.
