= Yvan Kyrlya =

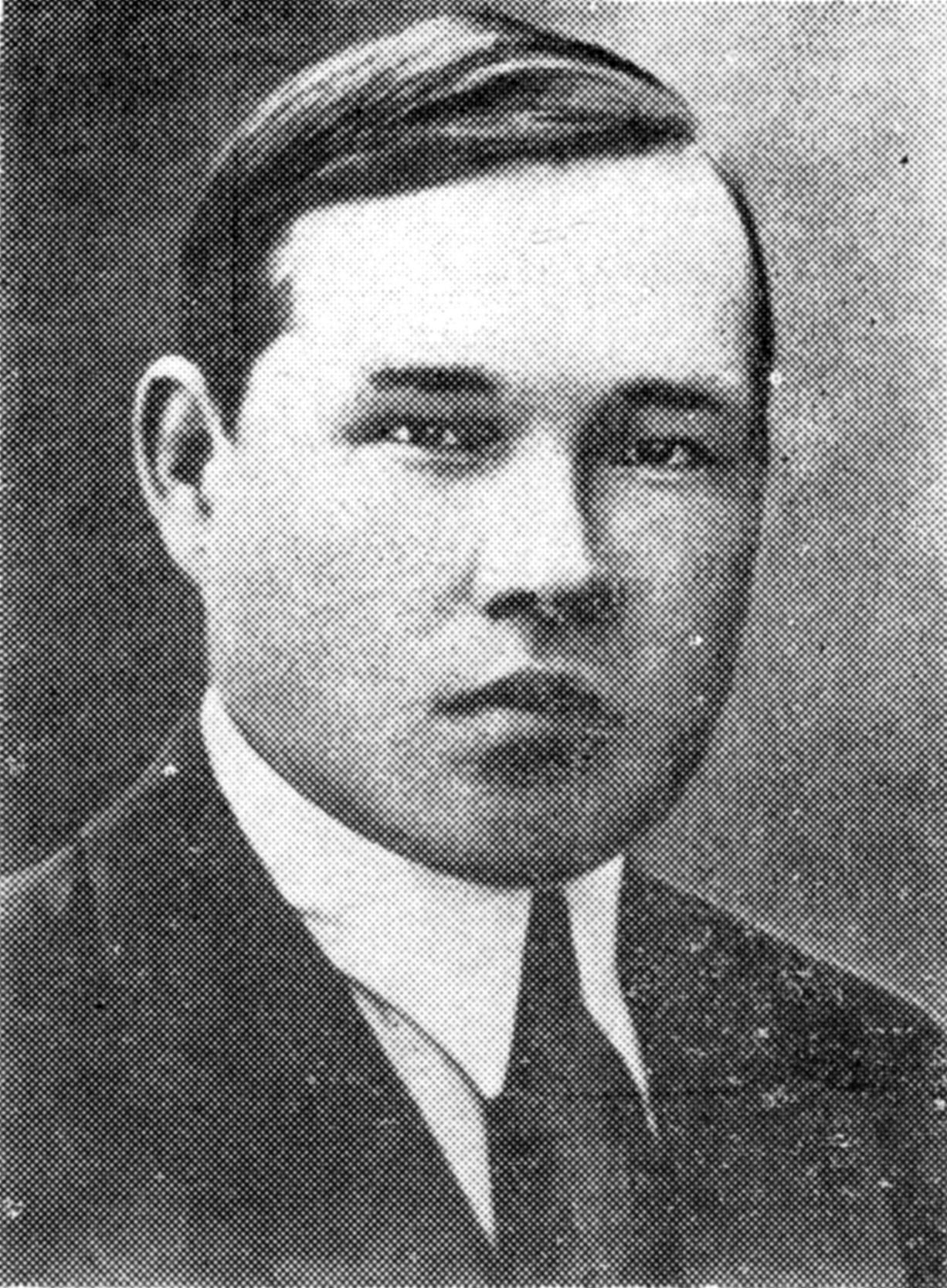
Yvan Kyrlya

Yvan Kyrlya (real name Kirill Ivanovich Ivanov) (Russian: Йыва́н Кы́рла; 17 March 1909, Kupsola – July 1943) was a Mari Soviet actor and poet, famous for his role of Mustafa Fert in the first Soviet sound film Road to Life (Putyovka v zhizn) (1931).

== Biography ==
Born into a poor peasant family, as a boy Kyrlya had to work as a farm labourer, a herdsman, and also beg. In the autumn of 1926 the Komsomol Committee of Mari Autonomous Region assigned him to study at workers' courses in Kazan University. Noticing his artistic gift the teachers gave him an assignment to the Actor's Department of the State Cinematography School in 1929.

Among the students of ethnic studios, Kyrlya was engaged in crowd scenes during production of the first Soviet sound feature film Road to Life. After watching its first episode the film director Nikolai Ekk took notice of the young actor and cast him for the role of the waifs’ leader Mustafa.

After graduation the actor worked at the Vostokfilm studio; in 1934–1936 he played the lama in Buddha’s Vicar by director Yevgeni Ivanov-Barkov. In 1937, Kyrlya moved to Yoshkar-Ola, the capital of Mari-El, to play in the Mari State Drama Theatre. In addition to his talent as an actor, Kyrlya was also a poet. Three books of his poetry were published in his lifetime.

Little is known about the last years of his life. There is a version that on 23 April 1937 he was arrested and sentenced to 10 years on a charge of “counter-revolutionary activity”. According to official data, Kyrlya died in one of the Ural prison camps in July 1943.

One of the streets of Yoshkar-Ola was named after Yvan Kyrlya in March 1969.
