= Alberto Barbera =

Italian film critic and festival curator (born 1950)

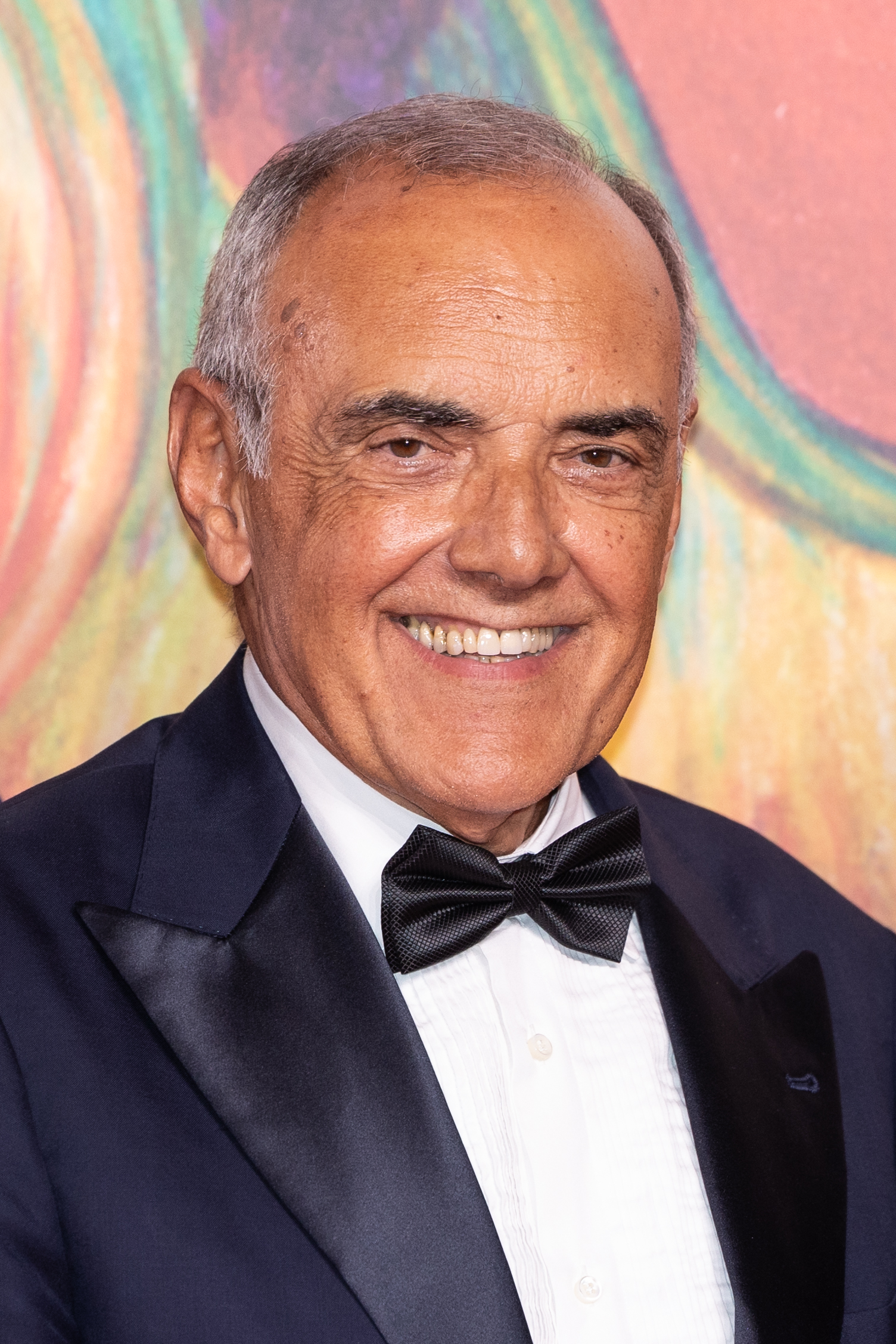
- Barbera in 2024
- Born: 20 February 1950 (age 76); Biella, Italy
- Occupation: Film critic

Alberto Barbera (born 20 February 1950) is an Italian film critic and festival curator, who is director of the Venice Film Festival.

== Life and career ==
Born in Biella, Barbera graduated in modern literature with a thesis about cinema history, and then started collaborating with the Turin film association AIACE, being its president between 1977 and 1989. Between 1980 and 1983 he was the film critic of the newspaper Gazzetta del Popolo, and later collaborated with several publications, including La Stampa, as well as with radio and television programs. In 1982, he began a long collaboration with the Turin Film Festival, first as press officer, then as secretary-general and member of the selection committee from 1984 to 1988, and finally as director from 1989 to 1998.

Between December 1998 and April 2002 Barbera was president of the Venice Film Festival, heading three editions (1999, 2000 and 2001). In 2004, he was nominated director of the National Museum of Cinema in Turin, a role he held until 2016. In December 2011, Barbera was appointed president of the Venice Festival for the second time. He was confirmed in this role for two more mandates, with the last term set to expire in 2024. In May 2024, his last mandate was extended until 2026. In March 2026, his tenure was prolonged, setting its new end date in 2028.

== Awards and accolades ==
- 2000 — titled Chevalier des Arts et des Lettres in France;
- 2019 — ranked one of the 500 most influential persons in show business by Variety;
- 2021 — International Achievement in Film Award by Variety;
- 2022 — Special Mention at Gotham Awards.
