= Palazzo del Cinema di Venezia =

Cinema in Venice, Italy

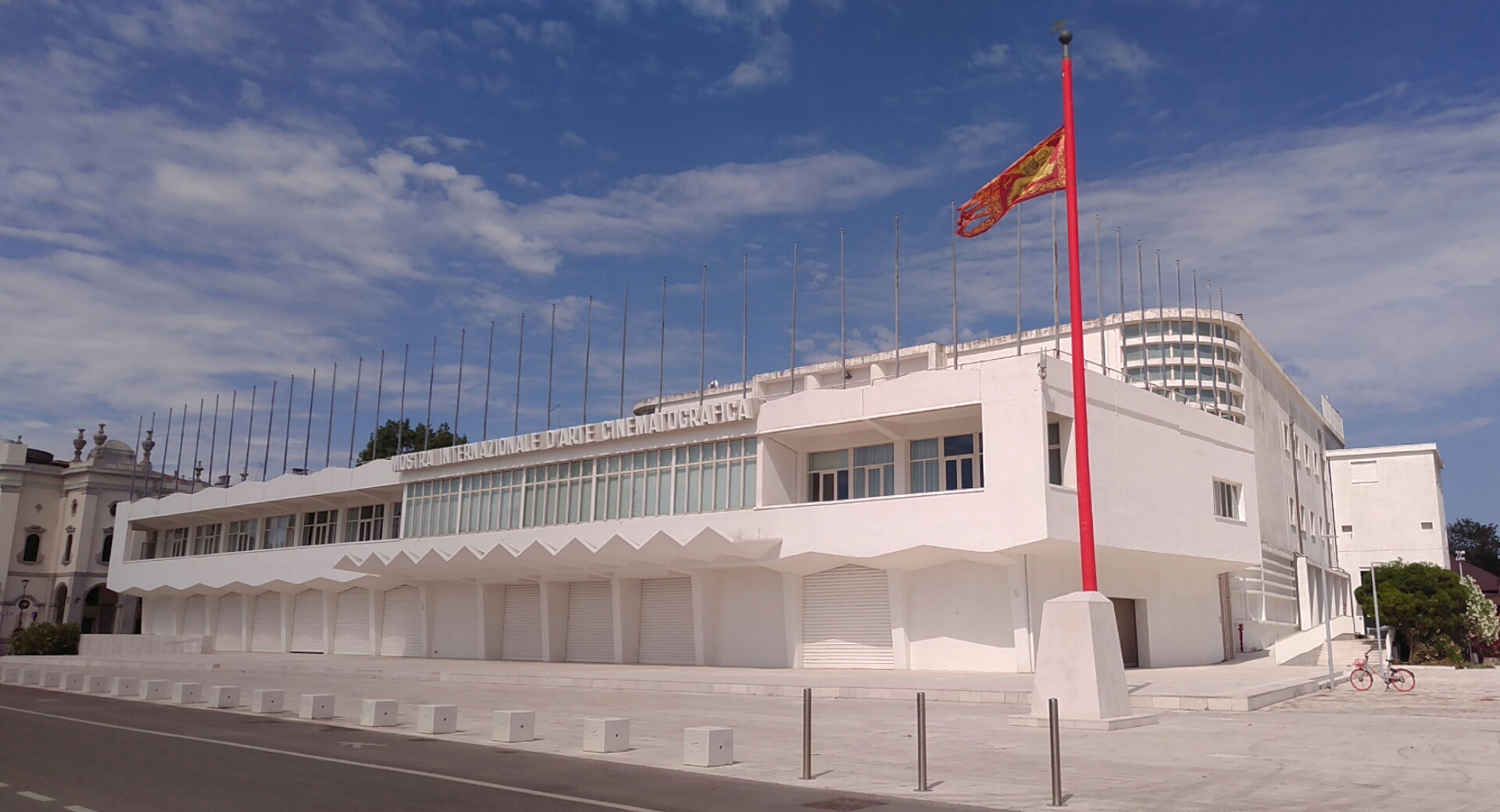
Palazzo del Cinema di Venezia

Palazzo del Cinema di Venezia is the place that hosts the Venice Film Festival and congress activities, located in Lido di Venezia, Venice, Italy.

== Description ==
There are three theaters in Palazzo del cinema: la Sala Grande with over 1 032 seats, the Zorzi (48 seats) and Pasinetti (119 seats) theatres.

== History ==
The first cinema exhibition was held on the terrace of the Hotel Excelsior on August 6, 1932. But, with the growing success, it became necessary to build a proper and prestigious venue; this took place between 1936 and 1937, based on a project by the engineer Luigi Quagliata, faithful to the dictates of modernism. The Casino was built in the same area, based on a project by the Chief Engineer of the Municipality, Eugenio Miozzi, who also took care of the layout of the entire area where the Austrian Fort of the Quattro Fontane stood. The urban plan envisaged the symmetrical construction of three buildings in the rationalist style, with the Casino in the center, the cinema building on the left and a third mirror building on the right, intended to house an ice skating rink, which was not built due to the onset of the Second World War. The Palazzo del Cinema, inaugurated on 10 August 1937 for the fifth edition of the Exhibition was then made up of a simple hall and a thousand-seat cinema hall (the present Great Hall). Following the continuous success of the festival, it became necessary to expand the building, which was entrusted to Quagliata himself in 1952. The overall project included the expansion of the Great Hall, an open arena, other cinemas, offices and services.; but only the forepart and the uncovered arena were built.
