= Valentina Ivashova =

Soviet actress

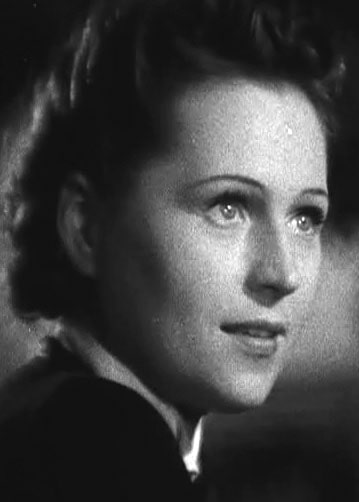
- Valentina Ivashyova (1942)
- Born: 12 July 1915; Russian Empire
- Died: 5 July 1991 (aged 75); Kiev, Soviet Union
- Other name: Valentina Semyonovna Ivashova
- Occupation: Actress
- Years active: 1936-1988 (film)

Valentina Semyonovna Ivashova (Ukrainian: Валентина Семенiвна Ивашова, Russian: Валентина Ceмёнoвна Ивашёва; 1915–1991) was a Soviet film actress. She was sometimes credited as Vera Ivashova.

== Selected filmography ==
- The Nightingale (1936)
- Young Pushkin (1937)
- Alexander Nevsky (1938)
- Rainbow (1944)
- Sorochinskaya Yarmarka (1948)

== Family ==
Valentina Ivashova was married to Soviet film director Nikolai Ekk.

== Bibliography ==
- Georges Sadoul & Peter Morris. Dictionary of Films. University of California Press, 1972.
