= Road to Life (1931 film) =

1931 film

Road to Life (Putyovka v zhizn)
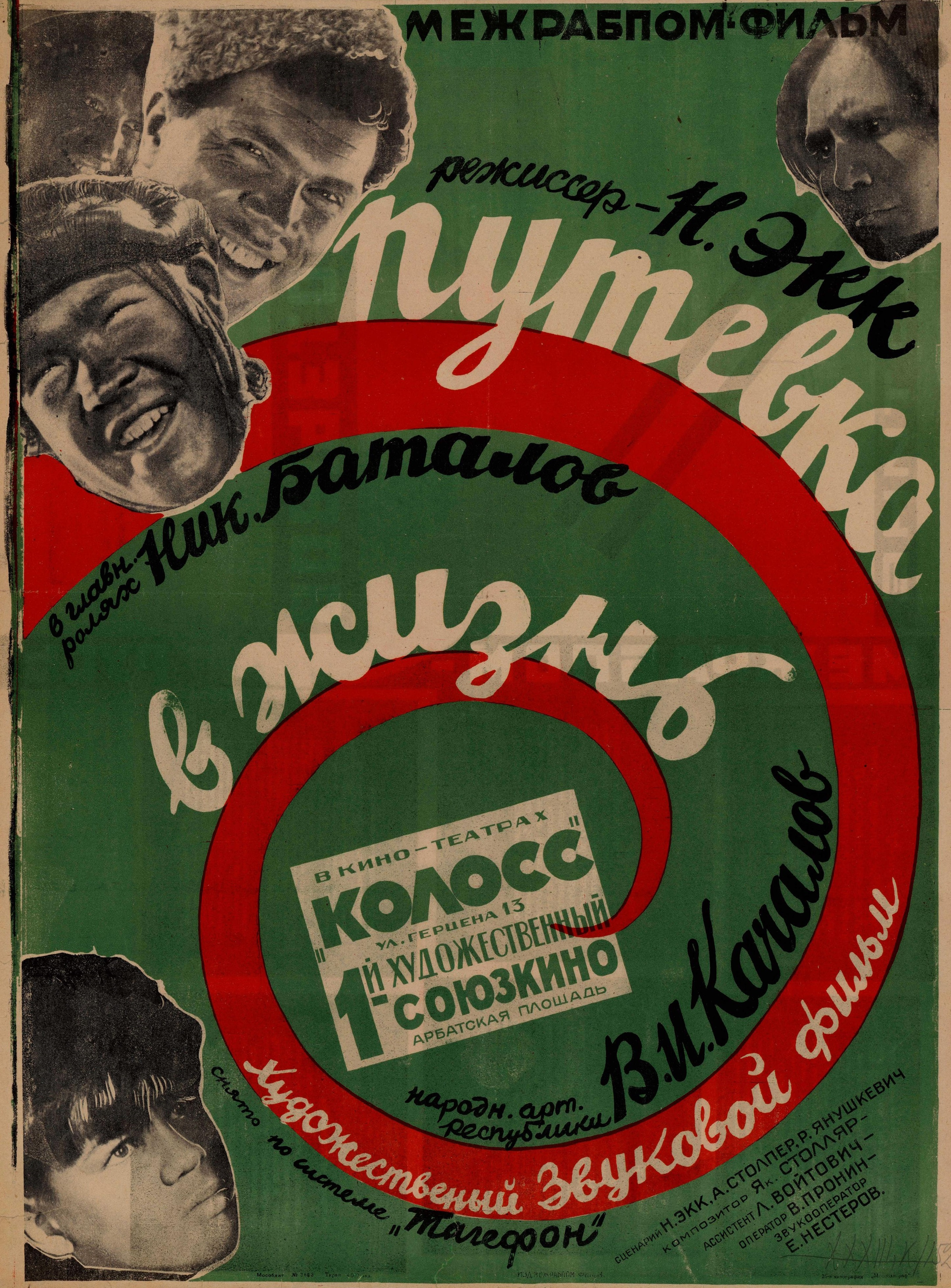
- Theatrical release poster
- Directed by: Nikolai Ekk
- Written by: Nikolai Ekk; Anton Makarenko
- Starring: Nikolai Batalov; Yvan Kyrlya; Mikhail Dzhagofarov
- Cinematography: Vasili Pronin
- Music by: Yakov Stollyar
- Production company: Mezhrabpom Films
- Release date: 30 September 1931 (Germany)
- Running time: 119 minutes
- Country: Soviet Union
- Languages: Russian, Mari

Road to Life (Russian: Путёвка в жизнь, romanized: Putyovka v zhizn) is a 1931 Soviet crime drama film written and directed by Nikolai Ekk. The film won an award at the 1932 Venice International Film Festival, which went to Ekk for Most Convincing Director.

It was the first sound film in the Soviet Union, and the first to be win a Best Director award at any film festival.

== Plot summary ==
In Moscow operates one of the countless gangs of street kids – Zhigan's gang. The boys who belong to it have been living on the street for a long time. In December 1923 police forces conduct a raid, and catch about a thousand homeless children. Almost all of them are distributed to orphanages. But there are several dozen minors who run away from all the orphanages to which they are sent. For example, Mustafa has escaped 8 times and had to be returned 15 times by the authorities. What is one supposed to do with them? This leads to a decision to send them over to a house of correction, that is, a prison for minors.

Sergeev offers another solution: to create a labor commune. The children will work as carpenters, shoemakers, carpenters, remain free citizens, they will feed themselves. But not with theft, instead with work ... Good intentions as always, are good only in theory. In practice, the former street kids do not immediately become honest hard workers ...

== Cast ==
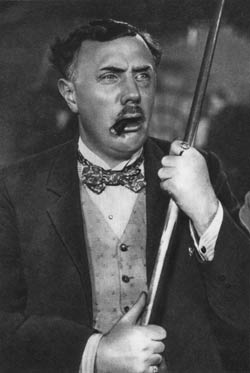
Zharov as Tomka Zhigan

- Nikolai Batalov as Nikolai Sergeiev
- Yvan Kyrlya as Dandy Mustapha
- Mikhail Dzhagofarov as Nikolai 'Kolka' Rebrov
- Aleksandr Novikov as Vaska Busa
- Mikhail Zharov as Fomka Zhigan
- Glikeriya Bogdanova-Chesnokova as a girl from a gang of Zhigan (not in the titles, the episode was cut and remains in the general plans only)
- Mariya Andropova as Maria Skriabina
- Vladimir Vesnovsky as Mr. Rebrov
- Mariya Gonfa as Lelka, aka 'Maziha'
- Bozhak Besprizornykh

== Production ==
The film was shot on the territory of the Bolshevskaya labor commune named after Genrikh Yagoda (established in February 1924). Several scenes were filmed on the territory of the Annunciation Monastery in Sarapul. The arrival of street children in the labor commune, as well as scenes of street rebellion, were all filmed in the village of Kolomenskoye. The Church of the Ascension in Kolomenskoye is also shown in the film.

This is the first appearance in film of actors Rina Zelyonaya and Georgiy Zhzhonov.

Old residents of the city of Dzerzhinsk (Lyuberetsky District) believe that the film tells the story of a labor commune located in the area of the Ugresha Monastery. They say that at Lyubertsy Dzerzhinsky on a single-track is a place where Zhigan killed Mustafa.

== Awards ==
The film's director Nikolai Ekk was named as the best director by a poll of viewers of the 1st Venice International Film Festival (1932).

== Legacy ==
While Genrikh Yagoda served as a comissar, Bolshevskaya commune being dedicated to him brought it certain advantages. After the arrest of Genrikh Yagoda in April 1937, the commune was broken and dispersed, Matvei Pogrebinsky shot himself, his books ("Factory of people", edited under Maxim Gorky, and others) were removed from libraries and destroyed. However, the film, due to its high international acclaim, was not withdrawn from circulation, but all mention of the commune itself were excised from the footage.
