= Nikolai Ekk =

Soviet and Russian film director and screenwriter

- Born: Nikolai Vladimirovich Ivakin; 14 June 1902; Riga, Russian Empire (now Latvia)
- Died: 14 July 1976 (aged 74); Moscow, Soviet Union (now Russia)
- Occupations: Film director Screenwriter

Nikolai Vladimirovich Ekk (Russian: Николай Владимирович Экк; 14 June 1902 – 14 July 1976) was a Russian film director and screenwriter in the Soviet Union. His surname was Ivakin (Russian: Ивакин) and "Ekk" was a pseudonym.

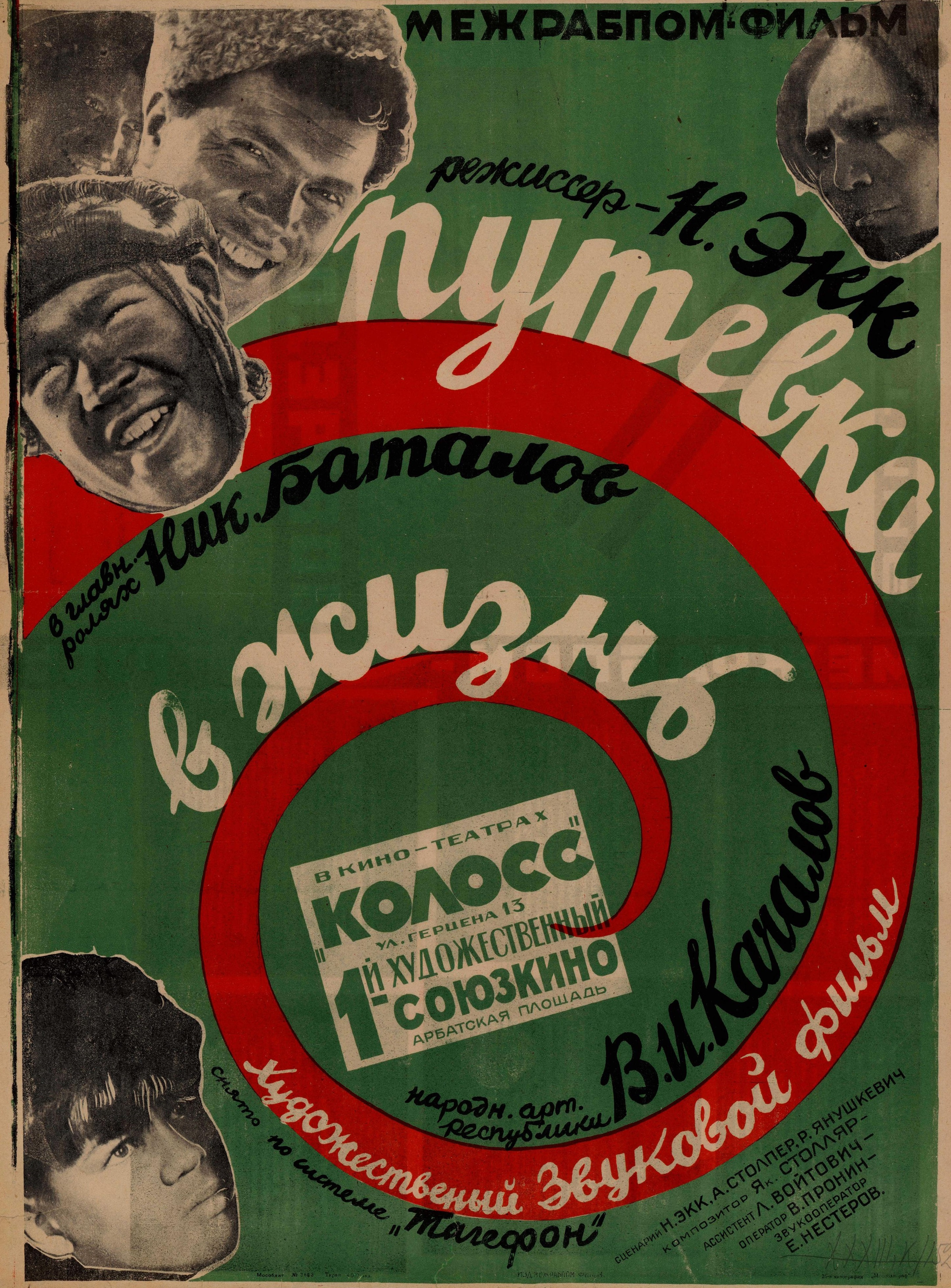
Poster of first Soviet sound film Road to Life (1931).

Born in Riga, he studied acting and directing in the theater of Vsevolod Meyerhold. He directed six feature films between 1929 and 1967. Among them was the first Soviet sound film Road to Life and the first Soviet color motion picture film The Nightingale.

== Filmography ==
- How Should and How Shouldn't (Как надо и как не надо) (1929)
- Road to Life (Путёвка в жизнь) (1931)
- Carnival of Colors (1935)

Carnival of Colors (1935), 42 min

- The Nightingale (Груня Корнакова) (1936)
- The Fair of Sorochyntsi (Сорочинская ярмарка) (1938)
- When the Snow Is Falling... (Когда падает снег...) (1962)
- A Man in a Green Glove (1967)
- The Nile and The Life (1968)
- Those People of the Nile (1972), writer

== Family ==
Nikolai Ekk was married to Ukrainian film actress Valentina Ivashova.

== See also ==
- Vsevolod Meyerhold State Theatre
