= Max Husmann =

Swiss citizen

Dr Max Husmann
- Born: 9 March 1888; Proskurov, Ukraine
- Died: 19 February 1965 (aged 76); Rome, Italy
- Occupation: Educator
- Known for: Helping to initiate, organise and mediate Operation Sunrise, the surrender of German troops in northern Italy in 1945.

Max Husmann (9 March 1888 – 19 February 1965) was a Swiss citizen who helped instigate and orchestrate Operation Sunrise (by Winston Churchill referred to as Crossword), the secret negotiations that led to the surrender of German troops in Italy in 1945, the beginning of the end of World War II.

Ending the war was a monumental task, largely because of the tenacity and loyalty of German officers who continued to fight on even when facing disaster. Max Husmann played a crucial role in persuading high-ranking officers of the Wehrmacht and the SS to force a surrender of German troops in spite of Hitler's orders.

Husmann was also central to ensuring the Operation kept going throughout the difficult months of spring 1945.

Max Husmann was a teacher who founded Institut Montana, a residential school near Zug in Switzerland, in 1926, based on the belief that education could help build a more tolerant and more peaceful world.

== Biography ==
Max Husmann was born in Proskurov, in current day Ukraine, but when he was ten years old his family emigrated to Switzerland, perhaps because of their Jewish origins. The Husmanns settled in Zürich, where Max gained the Swiss Matura and went on to study mathematics at the ETH and then earn his doctorate in 1915. Having helped to pay for his studies by giving private lessons, he set up a college, which was to merge with the Institut Minerva, to tutor students for entry to the ETH.

In 1925, Husmann bought the old Hotel Schönfels on the Zugerberg overlooking Lake Zug as a site where he could found a school. The Institut Montana opened the following year, and then expanded, acquiring the Felsenegg in 1937 making space to create sports grounds, dig a swimming pool, and equip science laboratories and workshops. By 1938 there were almost three hundred boys on the school roll.

Montana only just survived the war years, suffering severe losses in numbers of students and staff, and having its buildings requisitioned for troops and refugees. In 1946, Husmann handed day-to-day management to Dr Josef Ostermayer but also founded the Max Husmann Foundation to safeguard the principles on which he had founded the school. He lived much of the rest of his life in Rome, where he died of an arteriosclerosis in 1965. He was buried in Zug.

== Husmann the Peace-Broker ==
In February 1945, an Italian baron, Luigi Parrilli, contacted Max Husmann with information about an alleged German plan to scorch the earth of northern Italy, destroying agriculture, industry and homes as the Allied advance put the Wehrmacht into retreat. Parrilli claimed to have contacts among German officers ready to negotiate a surrender and avert this catastrophe. Husmann passed the intelligence to Colonel Max Waibel of the Swiss Nachrichtendienst, with whom he already had a working and friendly relationship. Waibel contacted Allen Dulles of the American Office of Secret Services who was working quietly, given Switzerland's neutral status, out of Bern.

Husmann's role in the secret Operation was in part logistical, meeting and accompanying the German negotiators, Guido Zimmer, Eugen Dollmann and Obergruppenführer Karl Wolff, on their discrete journeys from the Swiss-Italian border to meetings in Lugano, Ascona, Zürich and Lucerne. But he was also highly involved in the mediations that enabled Germans and Allies to find a point from which to pursue fruitful discussions. Max Waibel described several crucial stages of the Operation where Husmann's skills at reasoning were the key to unlocking negotiations that would otherwise have reached an impasse.

A critical episode, according to Waibel's report, was Wolff's journey to Zürich to meet Allen Dulles for the first time. Husmann accompanied the Germans across the Alps, ensuring that the presence of high ranking Nazi officials on Switzerland's neutral territory remained undiscovered. Waibel described in detail the dialogue shared between the Obergruppenführer and the school-master in a curtained compartment of the train. The words reflect those later used by Wolff about his move from absolute belief in Hitler to recognition that it was against the interests of the German people to continue the war. Husmann again acted as an intermediary at Ascona on March 19, when the Allied Generals Lemnitzer and Airey were sent from headquarters at Caserta to meet with the Germans to discuss the surrender.

The following weeks, as March turned into April and Allied troops launched a fierce offensive against the German troops still holding on to Italy, the Operation met and overcame a series of setbacks - the danger that Himmler and Hitler were picking up on Wolff's covert visits to Switzerland, increasing tensions between the Anglo-American and Soviet Allies and strenuous arguments between Wolff and the German Generals in command of the troops in northern Italy about the laying down of arms. When Allied headquarters sent orders to Dulles to call off the Operation, Waibel and Husmann held the situation together with the German emissaries at Waibel's home near Lucerne. Their decision was vindicated when the order was rescinded and arrangements made for the signing of the surrender document on April 29, 1945. It was the first surrender of WWII and the only capitulation before the death of Adolf Hitler was announced on May 1.

On Husmann's contribution to the Operation Waibel wrote –

No one was better qualified for such a task than Dr Husmann, an excellent schoolmaster who possessed not only a rare ability to enter the mind of his interlocutor but also had an exceptional facility and promptness of speech in a discussion. With no exaggeration, Dr Husmann deserves all the credit for exerting a decisive intellectual influence over the SS leaders who took part in the various negotiations. This Swiss teacher would complete his task with astonishing success; in fact, he, a civilian, managed to convince high and very high-ranking SS officers that their ideal world and their position of power were actually founded on error and would therefore soon collapse. ( p38)

After some initial publicity in 1945, details about Operation Sunrise were kept out of the public eye, especially in Switzerland where, for a complex set of reasons concerning the politics of neutrality and war-time economics ( pp 274–286) Husmann and Waibel were commanded not to speak or write anything about the Operation. Waibel's report was published in 1981, the first account in which Husmann's role was fully described. On the 60th anniversary of Operation Sunrise, in 2005, the significance of Switzerland to the negotiations, and roles played by Waibel and Husmann, was officially recognised by the Swiss government.

== Husmann defends Karl Wolff at Nuremberg ==
On May 12 Karl Wolff was arrested and transferred to Nuremberg to face charges for his involvement in Nazi atrocities. Max Husmann appeared in court on behalf of Wolff as did the other members of the Sunrise coterie – Allen Dulles, Lyman Lemnitzer, Gero von Gaevernitz, Terence Airey. Dulles and the rest of the Anglo-American team denied that deals had been made with Wolff during the course of the Operation, although he had shown courage and commitment to ending the war and so deserved leniency. Husmann (like Parrilli) maintained that immunity to war crime prosecution had been discussed and agreed. In August 1947, he wrote a letter at the request of Telford Taylor, chief counsel of the U.S. prosecution, stating that such promises had been made although Dulles was unable to confirm this in writing because of the delicate political situation. Although Operation Sunrise involved making "a pact with the devil", the advantages of securing the surrender were given precedence ( pp179/80). Research has since demonstrated that it is most likely that deals were made that traded working towards surrender against protection in war crimes trials, and that this accounts for the lenient sentence eventually served on Karl Wolff.

== Husmann the Educator ==
Documents from the 1920s and 1930s describing the early years of Institut Montana show that Max Husmann founded the school with specific aspirations about education and its goals. These were summarised in a paper given to educators at Harrow College in 1938 by Husmann's colleague, Huldreich Sauerwein. In Husmann's vision, an international boarding school housing a community of learners would help develop in young people the tolerance of and respect for other cultures that would guard against war; attention to the skills of thinking would help build a generation that would be strong against the evils of propaganda; and the teachings of Pestalozzi about attention to the individual child would help create a more thoughtful society.
