= Eugen Dollmann =

German diplomat (1900–1985)

Eugen Dollman
- Born: 8 August 1900; Regensburg, Kingdom of Bavaria, German Empire
- Died: 17 May 1985 (aged 84)
- Education: Ludwig-Maximilians-Universität München
- Known for: Work for German intelligence within the SS

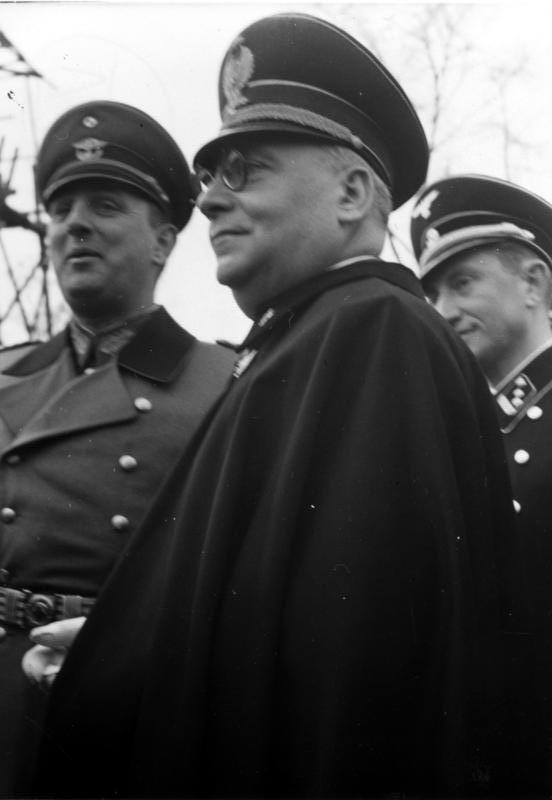
Left to right: Kurt Daluege, General Palma, Dollmann

Eugen Dollmann (8 August 1900 – 17 May 1985) was a German diplomat and member of the SS.

== Early life and family ==
The son of Paula Dollmann (born Schummerer) and Stefan Dollmann, he was born in 1900 in Regensburg. Dollmann graduated in 1926 at the Ludwig-Maximilians-Universität München as Doktor der Philosophie. From 1927 to 1930, Dollmann studied in Rome the history of the Farnese family and Italian art history.

He was living at the Piazza di Spagna where he worked as interpreter. There he met Heinrich Himmler, who introduced him to Karl Wolff. In 1934 Dollmann became Italienkorrespondent of the Münchner Neueste Nachrichten. In 1935 he became Chief of the NSDAP/AO Press office in Italy, and in 1937 he became SS-Obersturmbannführer.

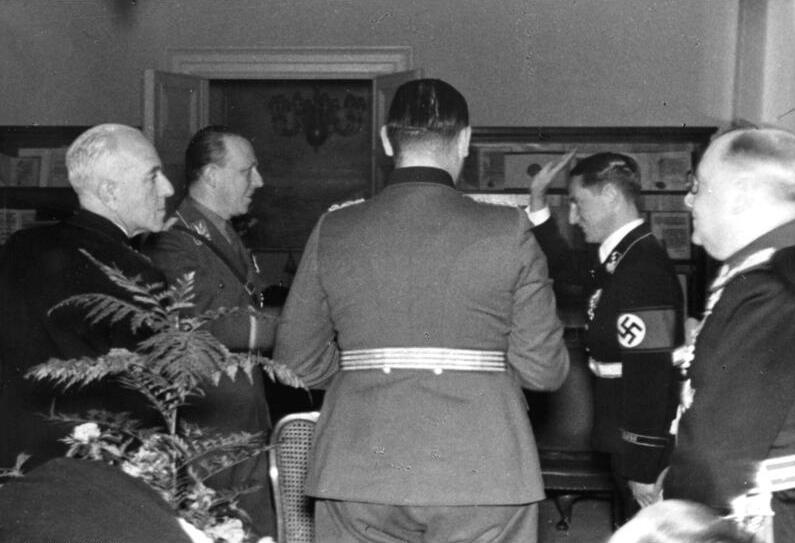
from left to right: Italian Police officer Arturo Bocchini, Wolf-Heinrich von Helldorf, Kurt Daluege, Dollmann (as Himmler's representative in Rome), General Palma.

== Diplomatic career ==
He helped Virginia Agnelli escape from detention, and with her help was able to arrange a meeting between SS-Obergruppenführer Karl Wolff and Pope Pius XII to negotiate the peaceful German evacuation of Rome. Later, as Befehlshaber der Polizei, he was Adjutant of Karl Wolff in a villa on the Lake Garda. On 20 July 1944 Dollmann was official interpreter at the meeting of Adolf Hitler and Benito Mussolini, at the Wolfsschanze, immediately after the 20 July plot.

He was friends with notable Italian anti-Semites Julius Evola and Roberto Farinacci.

Around 8 May 1945, Dollmann was protected from criminal prosecution of his involvement in war crimes by Cardinal Alfredo Ildefonso Schuster, Archbishop of Milan, with whom he had discussed the possibility for a separate peace between Nazi Germany and the Western Allies (Operation Sunrise). He hid Dollmann in a mental institution in Laveno-Mombello.

In 1946, Dollmann returned to Rome, was detected in a movie theater and arrested. He was liberated after an intervention by James Jesus Angleton of the CIA, who accompanied him to Bern to see Allen Welsh Dulles. He lived in Switzerland under a false identity. In 1952, Dollmann was expelled from Switzerland to Italy on the grounds of having had a homosexual relationship with a Swiss police official. Padre Parini helped him transfer to Spain, where he was employed by Otto Skorzeny in San Sebastián in the arms trade.

The Italian Intelligence Service issued false travel documents for Dollmann through Carlo Rocchi, a confidence man of the CIA in Milan. With these, Dollmann traveled into the Federal Republic of Germany. Dollmann was held in custody for one month for passport fraud.

Upon his release he lived in Munich in Das Blaue Haus, a boarding house at the back of the Munich Kammerspiele. He continued working as translator and made the translation for the German synchronization of La Dolce Vita by Federico Fellini.

He died in 1985 in Munich. The Italian historian Gianfranco Bianchi was executor of his will.

Dollmann formed the basis for the character of Major Bergmann in the film, Rome, Open City (1945) by Roberto Rossellini. He is also a character in the novel A Dark Song of Blood (2002) by Ben Pastor, set in Rome in 1944, and in Soviet TV-series Seventeen Moments of Spring (1973).

== Post-war life ==
After the war, Dollman would maintain contacts with the CIA director Allen Dulles, as well as continuing communication with the Grand Mufti of Jerusalem Haj Amin Al-Husseini.
