= Max Waibel =

Swiss soldier (1901–1971)

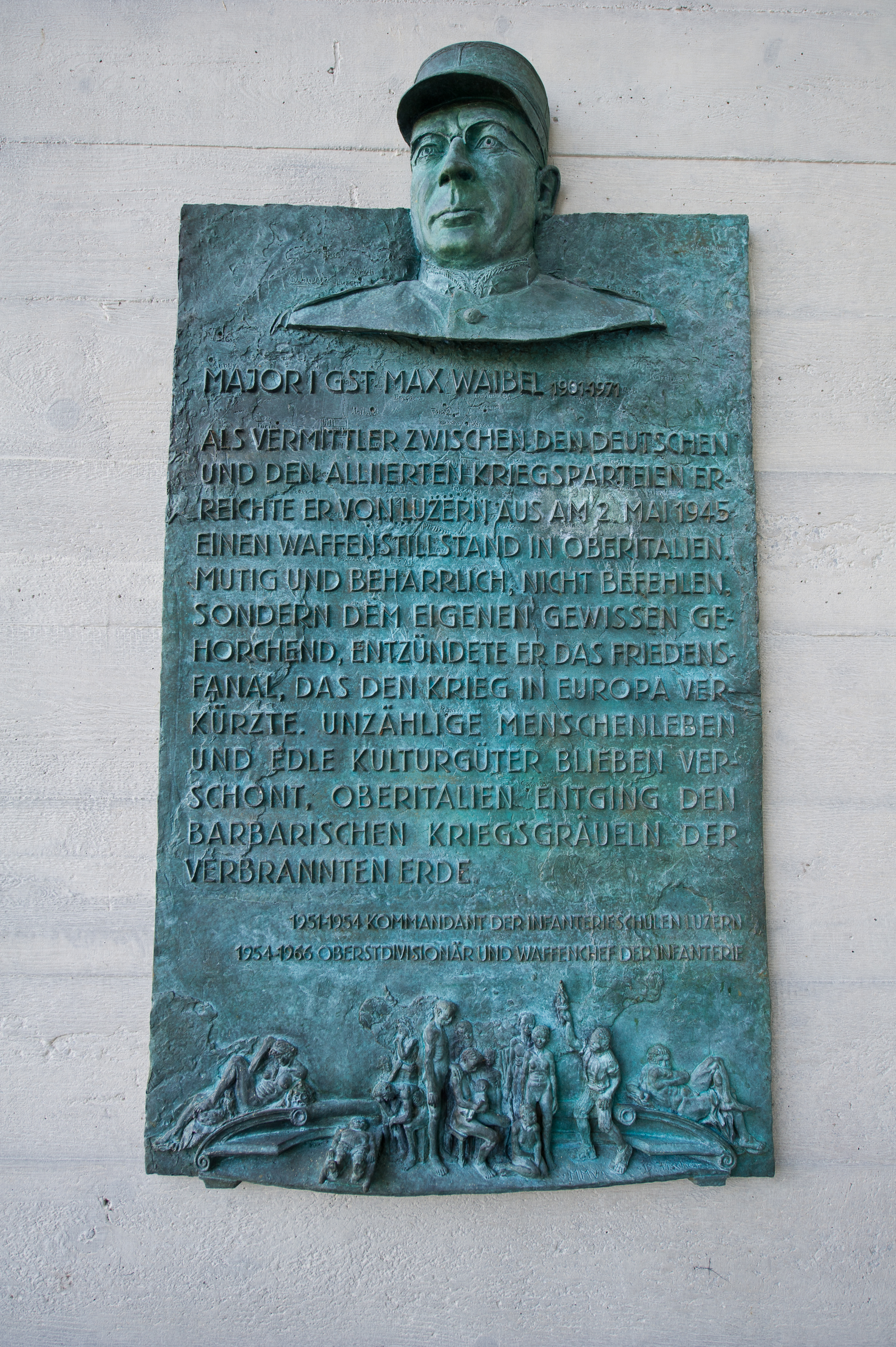
- Born: May 2, 1901; Basel
- Died: January 20, 1971 (aged 69); Lucerne
- Spouse: Margrit Schwytzer von Buonas
- Military career
- Allegiance: Switzerland
- Other work: Bank chairman

Max Waibel (2 May 1901 – 20 January 1971) was a Swiss army officer who played an important part in arranging the end of World War II in Italy.

== Life ==
Waibel was born in Basel in 1901, the son of Heinrich Adolf Waibel and Anna Sutter. He studied in Basel, Frankfurt and Giessen, receiving a doctorate in Political Sciences in 1923. From 1927 he took over the function of commanding officer of the Waffenplatz in Lucerne. In 1935 he was transferred to the General Staff and sent to the War Academy in Berlin in 1938. When war broke out in 1939, he returned to Switzerland and took over the management of the Rigi/Lucerne signal intelligence centre.

In 1940, Waibel was one of the founders of the Officers' League, which wanted to take on the fight against any invading German troops on their own should the Federal Council decide to surrender. Together with his deputy Bernhard Mayr von Baldegg, Waibel was arrested, but soon released and promoted to Major at the end of 1940. He participated in Swiss resistance organisation the Aktion Nationaler Widerstand, and was also associated with the Red Orchestra. He then headed the Intelligence Section 1 (NS-1, Rigi) of the Swiss Armed Forces and assigned Christian Schneider to forward militarily relevant information to the Soviet Union.

He was the authoritative mediator for SS General Karl Wolff arranging German capitulation in northern Italy. Secret meetings took place with him in Lucerne, in which the American CIA secret service chief Allen Dulles also took part. At the same time he was in contact with the Italian partisans. After the war, Waibel met with Allied generals who thanked him for his peace mediation. According to historian Edgar Bonjour, Operation Sunrise ended the war six to eight weeks earlier and preserved the rich cultural heritage of northern Italy from German destruction in the event of a forced retreat. In 1953 Max Waibel was promoted to Division Colonel.

Max Waibel was married to Margrit Schwytzer von Buonas from the Lucerne patrician family of the same name, and lived with his family in the prestigious Dorenbach mansion, in whose stately salons the mentioned negotiations took place. The meetings were held under great secrecy and threatened several times to fail, presenting every time a logistical masterpiece. Meetings were also held in the Hotel Schweizerhof in Lucerne and in Ascona and Lugano etc., with Generals Lemnitzer and Airey.

After retiring, Waibel became chairman of the bank of Ernst Brunner, a businessman who had become rich in penicillin trading. In 1970, the bank collapsed. Waibel gave a farewell Christmas party and then shot himself.

== Memorial ==
60 years after the end of the war, a memorial plaque was inaugurated in the presence of his family at the Army Training Center in Lucerne. Present was the Swiss Federal President Samuel Schmid and the ambassadors of the US, Russia, France and Italy. In his speech, former Secretary of State Franz Blankart said that Waibel would have been stopped by the Federal Council, had they known about his activities.

The inscription on the plaque reads:

As mediator between the German and the Allied warring parties he reached, in Lucerne on 2 May 1945, a truce in northern Italy. Courageous and opinionated, obeying not commands but his own conscience, he lit the beacon of peace which brought the war in Europe to an early close. Innumerable human lives and noble cultural assets were spared, Northern Italy escaped the barbaric war atrocities of the scorched earth.
