= Parrilli =

Parrilli is an Italian surname. Notable people with the surname include:

- Luigi Parrilli
- Nanci Parrilli (born 1953), Argentine politician
- Oscar Parrilli (born 1951), Argentine lawyer and politician
