= Fatima Grimm =

German translator (1934–2013)

- Born: Helga Lili Wolff; 25 July 1934; Munich, Nazi Germany
- Died: 6 May 2013 (aged 78); Hamburg, Germany
- Occupations: Translator, author and speaker on the subject of Islam in Germany
- Father: Karl Wolff

Fatima Grimm (25 July 1934 – 6 May 2013) was a German translator, author and speaker on the subject of Islam. She gained prominence as a Muslim convert in Germany and as a functionary in the German Muslim League in Hamburg.

== Life and work ==
Fatima Grimm, born Helga Lili Wolff, was the daughter of SS-Obergruppenführer, Karl Wolff, wartime Chief of Staff to Heinrich Himmler. In 1960 she converted to the Islamic creed in the Munich apartment of Ibrahim Gacaoglu. In 1962, Grimm moved to Czechoslovakia with her then-husband Omar Abdul Aziz, a Czech Muslim. Three years later she returned with her husband to Germany, where she was involved in the Munich municipality. Grimm and her husband divorced in 1983. On 1 April 1984, she married the widowed German convert Abdulkarim Grimm (1933–2009) and moved to Hamburg with him.

In the following decades, Grimm wrote and translated several books and wrote numerous articles, some of which appeared in the Al-Islam magazine. For several years Grimm was also in charge of the magazine. As a journalist Grimm devoted herself mainly to issues such as education and the role of women in Islam. A short-lived children's magazine, You and Islam,) was managed by her.

In addition, Grimm worked on a German translation of the Qur'an by a group of mostly women, including Halima Krausen and Eva-Maria El-Shabassy. The group planned a re-translation of the English translation of the Qur'an by Abdullah Yusuf Ali. The translation contained detailed comments from Abdullah Yusuf Ali, Muhammad Asad, al-Qurtubi, Sayyid Qutb, Daryabadi, Ibn Katheer, Mawdudi, al-Suyuti, and Abdul Hameed Siddiqi, that have been adopted and translated directly to comments from Sufis or Shiites. She worked for almost 16 years on 24 booklets of Al-Islam and in five volumes in SKD Bavaria, which the publisher of Abdel-Halim Khafagy published. Grimm's translation belongs alongside that of Muhammad Rassoul. Muhammed, who was from Central Council of Muslims in Germany (ZMD), wrote a guide for translating the Qur'an in 1999. According to the guide "oRIENTation," of the Institute of Islamic Studies of the Free University of Berlin, Grimm's translation was a good traditionalist and interpretive translation, and was "to the purpose of mission for orientation," describes the studies, which say she was "not recommended". The website of the ZMD, islam.de, called Grimm's Koran translation, which was accompanied by contemporary comments, her "probably greatest legacy." It states that it is the first jointly Sunnis and Shiite-developed Koran translation into German. "Islamic scholars have not dealt with their work," but "in the new departments for Islamic theology," wrote Hamida Behr in her obituary for Grimm.

A few weeks before his death in 1984, Grimm's father, Karl Wolff, made the Islamic profession of faith. At his grave, his daughter gave the funeral prayer in the presence of representatives of the Islamic Center of Munich (ICM).

From April 1999, Grimm was an honorary member of the advisory board of the ZMD. In addition, she and her husband Abdul Karim sat on the board of the German Muslim League eV Hamburg, and was a member of the Liberal Islamic Federation.

Grimm came to prominence because of a lecture that she gave for the first time in 1975, which was published in 1995 under the title The Education of Our Children from IZM. This "controversial publication of Fatima Grimm" claims, that a lack of Islamic education leading children to becoming a "mass of half-educated nationalists, communists or humanists."

Khadija Katja Wöhler-Khalfallah characterizes Grimm as an example of fundamentalist, anti-secular and jihadist polemic, quoting an essay about woman and family life in Islam written by Grimm and Aisha Lemun: " [...] This effort (jihad), can presently be carried out both with the sword and with the feather, with the blade as with a scalpel, or even with a sewing machine or a wooden spoon. Jihad is a struggle against all forces who attack Islam from within and without. Whether these attacks aim to mock Islam to weaken its traditions and customs or to undermine his political power, they must in any case be taken very seriously, because they seek to destroy the roots of our heritage."

The Constitutional Protection Report 2010 of the Baden-Württemberg State Office for State Protection noted that in essay one written by Grimm and published by IZM, it advocated the reintroduction of the Hadd punishments.

Grimm had a daughter, which died during childhood, and a son from her first marriage; and three stepchildren from her second marriage. She died on the evening of 6 May 2013 following a long illness in Hamburg.

== Publications ==
- Sayyid Abu-l-A'la Maudoodi- Belief and life in Islam (Herder-Library band 397th). Translated from Spanish by Fatima Heeren-Sarka. Issued on behalf of the Islamic Foundation, London. Herder, Freiburg im Breisgau, inter alia, 1971.
- Family Life in Islam- Speech delivered at the International Islamic Conference, London, on 8 April 1976. Mohammad Yusuf Khan, Lahore, 1976.
- Woman in Islam- Papers delivered at the International Islamic Conference, held in London from 3 to 12 April 1976. Islamic Council of Europe, Leicester 1976. ISBN 0-86037-004-6. Reissue by Islamic Foundation, Markfield 2007. ISBN 978-0-86037-004-8.
- Al-Islam (ed.): Kurshid Ahmad : principles of Islamic education (Series of the Islamic Center of Munich No. 3). Bulletin of the Islamic Center of Munich. eds., In cooperation with The Islamic Foundation. Translated from Spanish by Fatima Heeren. Islamic Center of Munich, Munich 1976. 4th edition in 1997 and 2005, ibid issued by the Islamic Community in Germany, ISBN 978-3-89263-003-6 or ISBN 3-89263-003-8.
- with Aisha Lemu example: Kvinden i Islam verden. Scientific Research House, Kuwait and Islamisk Ungdomsforbund, Valby 1978. ISBN 87-980656-4-5.
- Sound Foundations of Muslim families at the most fundamental social unit of the Islamic community. The Muslim Students Association of The United States & Canada, Bloomington, Indiana 1978.
- Zakat (Series of the Islamic Center of Munich. No. 6). In cooperation with the Muslim Students Association of the United States & Canada, Islamic Correspondence Course and the Waterval Islamic Institute. Translated from Spanish by Fatima Heeren. Islamic Center of Munich, Munich 1978
- Islamisk familieliv. Alif, Frederiksberg 1987 (reprint ibid 1994 ISBN 87-87728-74-5).
- Ahmad Kamil H. Darwish: What is Islam in collaboration with Darqawi Siddigyyah Zawiah of Tangier, Morocco?. Translated from Spanish by Fatima Heeren. Islamic Center of Munich, Munich 1978. ibid edition, 1997. ISBN 3-89263-000-3.
- Sayyid Abu'l-A'la Maudood: belief and life in Islam. Translated from Spanish by Fatima Heeren-Sarka. Islamic Foundation, Leicester, 1978. ISBN 0-86037-029-1 and ISBN 0-86037-028-3.
- Muhammad Ahsan manazir: Islam, faith and life. Translated by Ahmad al-Denffer and Fatima Heeren-Sarka. Islamic Foundation, Leicester, 1978. ISBN 0-86037-034-8.
- Fasting (Series of the Islamic Center of Munich. No. 5). 3rd edition By the Islamic Center of Munich in cooperation with The Muslim Students Association of the United States & Canada. Translated from Spanish by Fatima Heeren. Islamic Center of Munich, Munich 1978 (reprint 1982).
- Muhammad (Series of the Islamic Center of Munich. No. 7). In cooperation with the Muslim Students Association of the United States & Canada. Translated from Spanish by Fatima Heeren. Islamic Center of Munich, Munich 1978.
- Said Ramadan : Islamic law. Theory and practice. Translated by Fatima Heeren. Harrassowitz, Wiesbaden 1980. ISBN 3-447-02078-4.
- Taha Jabir Al-Alwani: Draft Alternatives Culture Plan. Translated by Fatima Grimm and Hanna Niemann. Muslim Student Association in Germany, Marburg 1992. ISBN 3-932399-12-9.
- Taha J. al-Alwani and Imad al Din Khalil: The Koran and the Sunnah. The time-space factor. Translated by Fatima Grimm and Maryam Reissmann. International Institute of Islamic thought, Herndon, Virginia, 1994 (ISBN 1-56564-053-5) and Muslim Student Association in Germany, Marburg 1994 (ISBN 3-932399-11-0).
- Sayyid Abu'l-A'la Maududi: belief and life in Islam (Series of the Islamic Center of Munich No. 24). Translated from Spanish by Fatima Heeren-Sarka. Islamic Center of Munich, Munich (also International Islamic Federation of Student Organizations, Kuwait) 1994. ISBN 3-89263-024-0.
- Inner peace (lectures about Islam. No. 2). 3rd edition. Islamic Center of Munich, Munich 1995. ISBN 3-89263-602-8.
- Information Center Islamic Center of Munich (ed.): The education of our children (Lectures on Islam No. 3). Editorial: Tilmann Schaible. Islamic Center of Munich, Munich 1995. ISBN 3-89263-603-6. 2nd revised by Tilmann Schaible edition. Dâr-us-Salaam, Garching, 2000. ISBN 3-932129-63-6.
- Sayyid Abul A'la Maududi: Islamic life (Series of the Islamic Center of Munich No. 17). Translated into German by Ayisha Niazi and Fatima Heeren. Islamic Center of Munich, Munich (also International Islamic Federation of Student Organization, Kuwait) 1996. ISBN 3-89263-017-8.
- Said Ramadan: Islamic law. Theory and practice. Translated by Fatima Heeren. 2nd edition, published by the Muslim Student Association in Germany eV in cooperation with the Islamic Council in Germany eV Editing by Amena El-Zayat. Muslim Student Association in Germany, Marburg 1996. ISBN 3-932399-00-5.
- other: Tarǧamat Ma'aanee'l-Glorious Quran ila'l-Luga al-almānīya (The Meaning of the Qur'an). 5 volumes. SKD Bavaria, Munich 1996–1997. ISBN 3-926575-40-9.
- with Aisha Lemu example: women and family life in Islam (Series of the Islamic Center of Munich No. 20); translated by Abdullah Hammam. 3. Edition. Islamic Center of Munich, Munich 1999. ISBN 3-89263-020-8.
- Tilmann Schaible (ed.): Fatima Grimm and Timann Schaible: How do I make prayer in Islam (elementary knowledge Islam No. 2)? Dâr-us-Salaam, Garching bei Munich, 2000. ISBN 3-932129-02-4.
- Islam through the eyes of a woman. 2nd, revised edition. SKD Bavaria-Verlag, Munich 2002. ISBN 3-926575-92-1.
- Selection from the ocean of mercy. The teachings of Großscheikhs our master Shaykh 'Abdullah ad-Daghestani an-Naqshbandi. Explains through his representative and successor Nazim al-Qubrusi. Compiled, translated and edited by Hassan P. Dyck and Fatima Heeren. 2nd edition, revised edition by Abd al-Hafidh Wentzel. Warda-Publ., Hellenthal 2005. ISBN 978-3-939191-03-2 or ISBN 3-939191-03-5.
- Muhammad Ahmad Rassoul (ed.): Inner Peace. 3rd, improved and expanded edition. Islamic Library, Cologne 2006. ISBN 3-8217-0075-0.
- Muhammet Mertek (ed.): Short Suras from the Koran and a few selected prayers; translated by Fatima Grimm. Fountain-Verlag, Offenbach am Main 2009. ISBN 978-3-935521-50-5.
- Ali Ünal (ed.): The Qur'an and its translation. With comments and annotations; translated by Fatima Grimm and Wilhelm Willeke. Fountain-Verlag, Offenbach am Main 2009. ISBN 978-3-935521-45-1 or ISBN 978-3-935521-46-8.
- Fatima Grimm (ed.) Cloth feeling. Stories of life with and without headscarves. Narrabila Verlag, Berlin, 2013. ISBN 978-3-943136-06-7.
