= Institut Montana Zugerberg =

Location
- Zugerberg in Canton of Zug, Switzerland
- Coordinates: 47.1443°N 8.5338°E

Information
- School type: Private international boarding school
- Motto: My Place to Grow
- Religious affiliation: Secular
- Established: 1926
- Authorizer: Council of International Schools (CIS), Canton of Zug, IBO, Cambridge CIE (IGCSE Programme)
- Director: Alexander Biner
- Staff: ~120
- Faculty: 70
- Gender: Co-educational
- Enrollment: ~380 (150 boarding students)
- Student to teacher ratio: 1:4
- School fees: Boarding students CHF 75,000 per annum (varies according to age group), extern students CHF 31,000 per annum (varies according to age group)
- Website: montana-zug.ch

Institut Montana Switzerland is a Swiss international day and boarding school located on Mt. Zugerberg, overlooking the city of Zug and its lake. It opened on May 3, 1926. Today it is a co-educational school that takes around 380 students. Over 55 nationalities are represented on campus. Institut Montana accepts students aged 6 to 19 from all parts of the world. The school is divided into four sections: a Swiss bilingual elementary school and a Swiss bilingual secondary school, both following the Lehrplan 21 (de); a Swiss senior high school offering the Swiss Matura; and an international school that follows the Cambridge Lower Secondary, Cambridge IGCSE and International Baccalaureate diploma programmes.

== History ==
Institut Montana Zugerberg was founded by Dr Max Husmann, who purchased the site in 1925. The next year the school opened with six pupils. The campus was extended with the acquisition of the nearby Hotel Felsenegg in 1937 and the construction of laboratories, workshops, sports fields and a swimming pool. The belief that an international education would contribute towards maintaining peace across Europe guided the school's developing pedagogy.

World War II devastated pupil numbers, but Institut Montana kept going. In 1945, Husmann was involved in Operation Sunrise, the secret negotiations that led to the surrender of the German Army in northern Italy. He handed the directorship of the school to Dr Josef Ostermayer in 1946, but maintained in close contact and set up the Max Husmann Foundation to ensure the continuation of the principles on which he founded Institut Montana Zugerberg.

The school's logo was created in 1947 by the graphic artist Hans Tomamichel. It uses a globe and an olive branch to represent the school's mission to teach international understanding and so help towards world peace.

In 1995, student enrolment fell to an economically unviable number, and the board and senior management announced the school's imminent closure. However, staff, parents, friends and alumni implemented a rescue plan under the chairmanship of Professor Beat Bernet, and the alumnus François Loeb. Funds of more than CHF3.5 million were raised, ensuring the immediate continuation of the school as well as its sustainable future.

== Academics ==
Students between the ages of 6 and 12 attend the Bilingual Primary School, where a full language immersion programme in English and German is followed. The curriculum is based on the primary curriculum of the Canton of Zug adapted to prepare children for entry into the International School, with its IB Diploma Programme, or the Swiss Gymnasium for the Swiss Matura.

From age 12, students at Institut Montana Zugerberg can choose between the Bilingual Secondary School, the Swiss Matura or the IB Diploma Programme.

The Bilingual Secondary School follows the Swiss skill-based curriculum that focuses on competence and active learning. It is delivered in English and German so that students become proficient at both, opening opportunities for future studies or career paths.

The Swiss Gymnasium at Montana was recognized to award the Swiss Matura by the Canton of Zug in 1936. Students can follow the traditional German course, or the bilingual German and English option, to gain this qualification for entry to Swiss universities.

Institut Montana has been an accredited International School since 1952. Students follow an international curriculum through the Cambridge Lower Secondary, Cambridge IGCSE, and International Baccalaureate diploma programmes.

Class sizes are kept to a maximum of 15 students and a system of personal mentoring is in place. Students develop self-study skills at Subject Ateliers, where they can work on their assignments under the guidance of subject teachers.

Montana was the first residential boarding school in Switzerland to become an IB World School in 1987. Boarders are accepted from the age of 10.

The school's Physical Outdoors Programme is designed to provide physical education that makes the most of its surroundings, so includes skiing, skating and sledging in winter and hiking, climbing and activities on the lake in the summer.

The school first ran a summer camp in 1939, and continues to hold summer sessions each year. Children take classes in intensive English or German in the mornings and pursue a wide-range of activities in the afternoons.

== Co-curricular activities ==
Since 2009, Institut Montana Zugerberg has offered a Model United Nations programme, where students meet for political debates in a United Nations context on a weekly basis, and attend international conferences. It hosts its own international MUN conference each year. . The MUN educates students about global affairs, raises awareness of current issues and enhances their international experience. The MUN programme is also preparation for university, developing students’ skills in presentation, argumentation and debate.

A wide range of other activities is available to students. Examples are entrepreneurship, science and technology, visual arts, drama, music and mountain biking, along with many other sports activities and teams.

== Alumni ==
Former pupils from Institut Montana Zugerberg are found all over the world filling roles in commerce, politics and the arts. Some names have become famous, including U.S. politician John Kerry, film director Marc Forster, businessman Nicolas Hayek; comic artist Mike van Audenhove; and Dutch scientist and entrepreneur Willem P.C. Stemmer. U.S. Ambassador Robert P. Jackson taught French and English as a foreign language at Institut Montana Zugerberg in 1982. Spanish Borbón princes Alfonso and Gonzalo had to leave the school, reluctantly, in 1953 when their father, against the will of their mother, agreed that they were to be taken to Spain to be educated as heirs to the throne under the guidance of dictator Francisco Franco.
