= Terence Airey =

British Army general (1900–1983)

Lieutenant-General Sir Terence Airey KCMG CB CBE
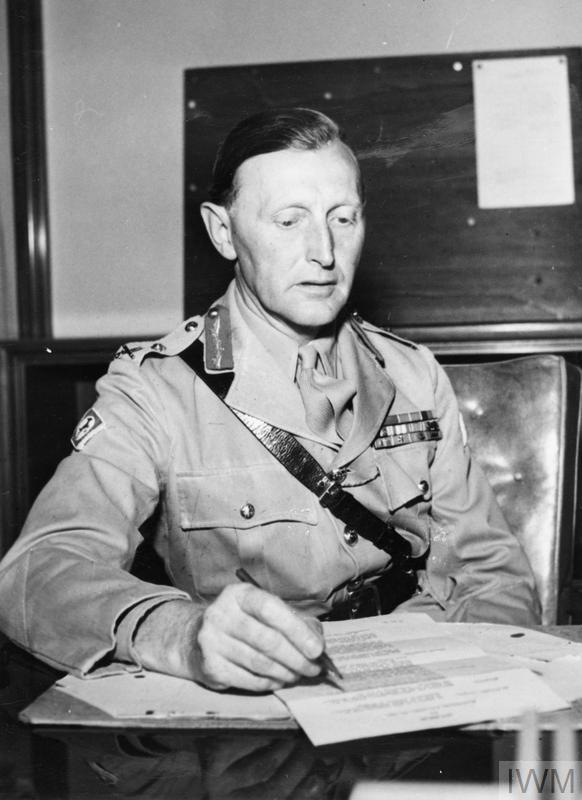
- Born: 9 July 1900; King's Lynn, Norfolk, England
- Died: 26 March 1983 (aged 82); Fritton, Norfolk, England
- Military career
- Allegiance: United Kingdom
- Branch: British Army
- Service years: 1919–1954
- Rank: Lieutenant-General
- Service number: 20246
- Unit: Durham Light Infantry
- Commands: British Forces in Hong Kong (1952–1954)
- Conflicts: Second World War
- Awards: Knight Commander of the Order of St Michael and St George; Companion of the Order of the Bath; Commander of the Order of the British Empire; Mentioned in Despatches (3); Officer of the Legion of Merit (United States); Officer of the Legion of Honour (France); Croix de guerre (France)

Lieutenant-General Sir Terence Sydney Airey, KCMG, CB, CBE (9 July 1900 – 26 March 1983) was an officer in the British Army.

== Family and education ==
Airey was the son of Sydney Airey. He was educated at Gresham's School, Holt, and the Royal Military College, Sandhurst.

Airey was married on 1 November 1933 in Egypt to Constance Hedley, who bore him a son named John Francis St George Airey. This marriage was dissolved in 1947, when he married secondly Bridget Georgiana Vesey, a daughter of Colonel the Hon. Thomas Eustace Vesey and Lady Cecilia Kathleen Browne, daughter of the 5th Earl of Kenmare. Lady Airey died in 2006.

== Military career ==
=== Before the Second World War ===
After passing out from Sandhurst, Airey received a commission in the Durham Light Infantry on 16 July 1919, over eight months after the First World War had ended. He later went on to serve as a staff officer in the Sudan in 1929 and on the British Military Mission to the Egyptian Army. Returning to England, he attended the Staff College, Camberley from 1935 to 1936.

=== Second World War ===
Airey was still involved in military affairs at the outbreak of the Second World War, by which time he was a lieutenant colonel. In 1941, he was serving under General Sir William Platt in Abyssinia, after which he returned to General Headquarters in Cairo: there he was appointed Director of Special Operations and later Director of Military Intelligence. During the latter part of the Tunisian campaign, Airey served as a Brigadier (General Staff) in the 18th Army Group.

In June 1944, Airey was promoted major general and was later appointed Assistant Chief of Staff to General Harold Alexander. In this capacity, he flew to Switzerland with Lyman Lemnitzer, both disguised as Irish businessmen, to meet Allen Dulles. Airey's cover was as a Mr MacNeilly who claimed to be on a business trip to buy a German dachshund called Fritzel.

The three met the SS General Karl Wolff, with Airey trying to negotiate a meeting between Wolff and General Alexander to discuss the surrender of German forces in Italy. He did not, however succeed in arranging the meeting, and when the Soviets found out, the United States and United Kingdom were accused of going behind their allies' backs. Wolff was later protected by Dulles and Lemnitzer, much to Airey's disdain. The Karl Wolff affair would later be known as Operation Sunrise, but at the time was codenamed Operation Fritzel.

=== Postwar service ===
After the war, Airey served for a year as Chief of Staff to Commander-in-Chief of Central Mediterranean Forces and was for a time Acting Deputy Supreme Allied Commander in the Mediterranean Theatre.

In 1947, he was appointed Commander and Military Governor of the Anglo-American Zone, Trieste, which was later handed over to the Italians and Yugoslavs. The position was originally intended to be only temporary, but Airey continued in it until 1951. He helped restore stability to a war-battered area, particularly in the harbour and in re-opening trade routes. Before Airey arrived, the area had been under the power of a Communist 'shadow government' which assassinated its political opponents. He is said to have been dearly missed by the people of Trieste.

After his service at Trieste, Airey was appointed Assistant Chief of Staff, Intelligence, to General Dwight D. Eisenhower at Supreme Allied Headquarters.

His last military appointment was as Commander of British Forces in Hong Kong from February 1952 to 1954. He retired from military service in 1954, and served as honorary Colonel of the Regiment of the Durham Light Infantry until 1956.

== Retirement ==
In August 1956, he was appointed delegate-general of the European Foundation of Culture, which sought to revive the idea of Europe as a single cultural community.

Airey is known to have attended early meetings of the Bilderberg Group and was a member of the Group's European Steering Committee.

He lived in Fritton in South Norfolk.

== Bibliography ==
- Smart, Nick (2005). Biographical Dictionary of British Generals of the Second World War. Barnesley: Pen & Sword. ISBN 1844150496.

Military offices
Preceded by Sir Geoffrey Evans	Commander of British Forces in Hong Kong; 1952–1954	Succeeded by Sir Cecil Sugden
Honorary titles
Preceded by John Churchill	Colonel of the Durham Light Infantry; 1952–1956	Succeeded by Sir Nigel Poett
