= Surrender at Caserta =

German and Italian Fascist surrender document during WWII

Instrument of Surrender of all German and Italian Republican forces in Italy
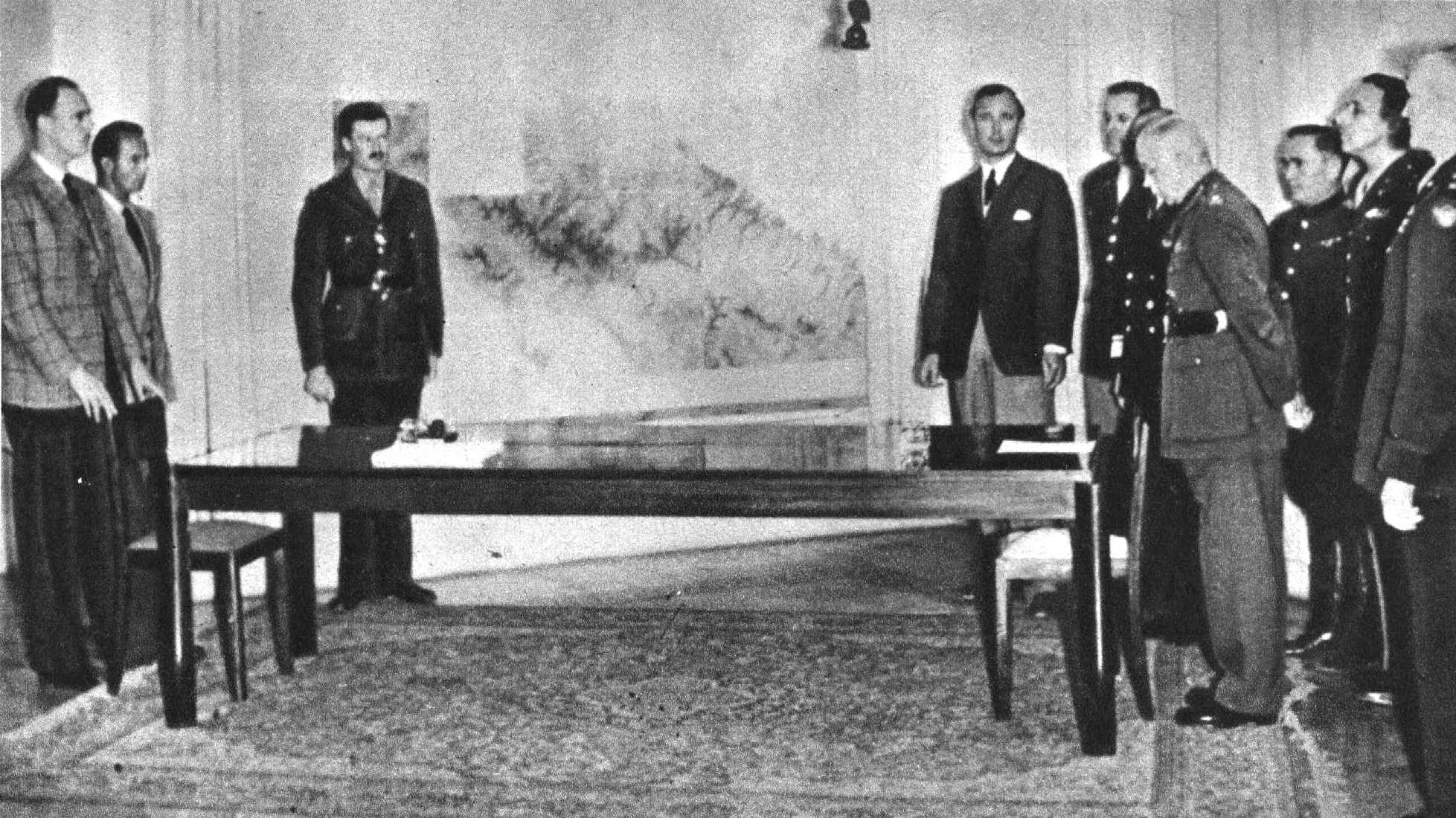
- German delegations (at left) with Allied delegations including a Soviet representative (at right) at the ceremony in Caserta
- Type: Capitulation
- Signed: 29 April 1945
- Location: Royal Palace of Caserta, Italy
- Effective: 2 May 1945
- Signatories: (Nazi Germany) Victor von Schweinitz (Nazi Germany) Eugen Wenner (United Kingdom) William Duthie Morgan
- Parties: Germany; Italian Social Republic; United Kingdom; United States; Soviet Union; Poland

The Surrender at Caserta (Italian: Resa di Caserta, pronounced [ˈreːza di kaˈzɛrta, ˈreːsa -, - kaˈsɛrta]) of 29 April 1945 was the written agreement that formalized the surrender of German and Italian Fascist forces in Italy, ending the Italian Campaign of World War II.

== Background ==
Since March 1945, SS Obergruppenführer Karl Wolff, the commander of the German occupying forces in Italy, had begun negotiations for the local surrender of Axis forces in Italy. The Allies sent different negotiators, notably OSS agent Allen Dulles to negotiate the surrender in Switzerland. Wolff believed that a separate peace agreement might break the alliance of United States, United Kingdom, and the Soviet Union, as the Allies agreed that they would accept only unconditional surrender during the Casablanca Conference. Hearing of the negotiations, the Soviet Union also wanted to send a Soviet representative to be part of the negotiations, but the other Allies refused.

Owing in part to Allied air attacks, the German forces in Italy had received no supplies from Germany since the first week of April. Since Allied aircraft had destroyed all bridges across the Po river, the Germans abandoned their heavy weapons and motor vehicles south of it during the Allied spring offensive. What was left of the German infantry along with the RSI forces was mostly wiped out during the fighting. The remaining troops had retreated across the Po using improvised transports and were reorganized by blocking detachments to man the front line and fight on, but without arms their situation was hopeless.

== Surrender ==
On 26 April, Wolff convinced Marshal Rodolfo Graziani, the Minister of Defence of the Italian Social Republic and Commander-in-Chief of the Army Group Liguria, to sign a surrender document of the German and RSI forces under his command equivalent to the German surrender document. Graziani signed the surrender document and gave it to Wolff and later endorsed them to Major Wenner. On 29 April, Graziani handed himself in to General Crittenberger's US IV Corps.

German Commander-in-Chief of Army Group C Heinrich von Vietinghoff had noted on 28 April that fighting would cease within one or two days regardless of negotiations, the German troops having neither arms nor ammunition left. Further destruction was thus unlikely, Army Group C having decided already on 11 April not to carry out Hitler's scorched earth policy.

The surrender ceremony was held at Caserta. The German delegations were received by the Allied representatives, then the Allied representatives asked the two officers to present their credentials, Lt. Col. Schweinitz stated that he was acting on behalf of Vietinghoff, while Major Wenner stated that he was acting on behalf of Wolff, Wenner adds that he was also acting on behalf of Graziani. They were then given the surrender document in which the two accepted.

At 1400, Lt. Col. Schweinitz signed the surrender document on behalf of General Vietinghoff, then Major Wenner signed on behalf of SS Obergruppenführer Wolff and Marshal Graziani. For the Allies, Lt. Gen. Morgan signed on behalf of Field Marshal Alexander. On 1 May, Graziani ordered the Army Group Liguria to surrender, while all German and RSI forces in Italy surrendered a day after.

The Soviets were present at the signing event. The Soviet Military Command sent General Aleksei Kislenko to Caserta to witness the signing ceremony after the Soviets protested the secret negotiations between the other Allies and the German and RSI forces in Northern Italy. Polish Lt. Wrajewski was also present to witness the signing ceremony.

== Signatories ==
- Axis:
  - Lt. Col. Victor von Schweinitz - on behalf of General Heinrich von Vietinghoff, as commander of Army Group C
  - Major Eugen Wenner - on behalf of SS Obergruppenführer Karl Wolff, as commander of the Supreme SS and Police Leader in Italy and Marshal Rodolfo Graziani, as Minister of Defence of the Italian Social Republic
- Allies:
  - Lt. Gen. William Duthie Morgan - on behalf of Field Marshal Harold Alexander, as commander of the 15th Army Group

== Gallery ==
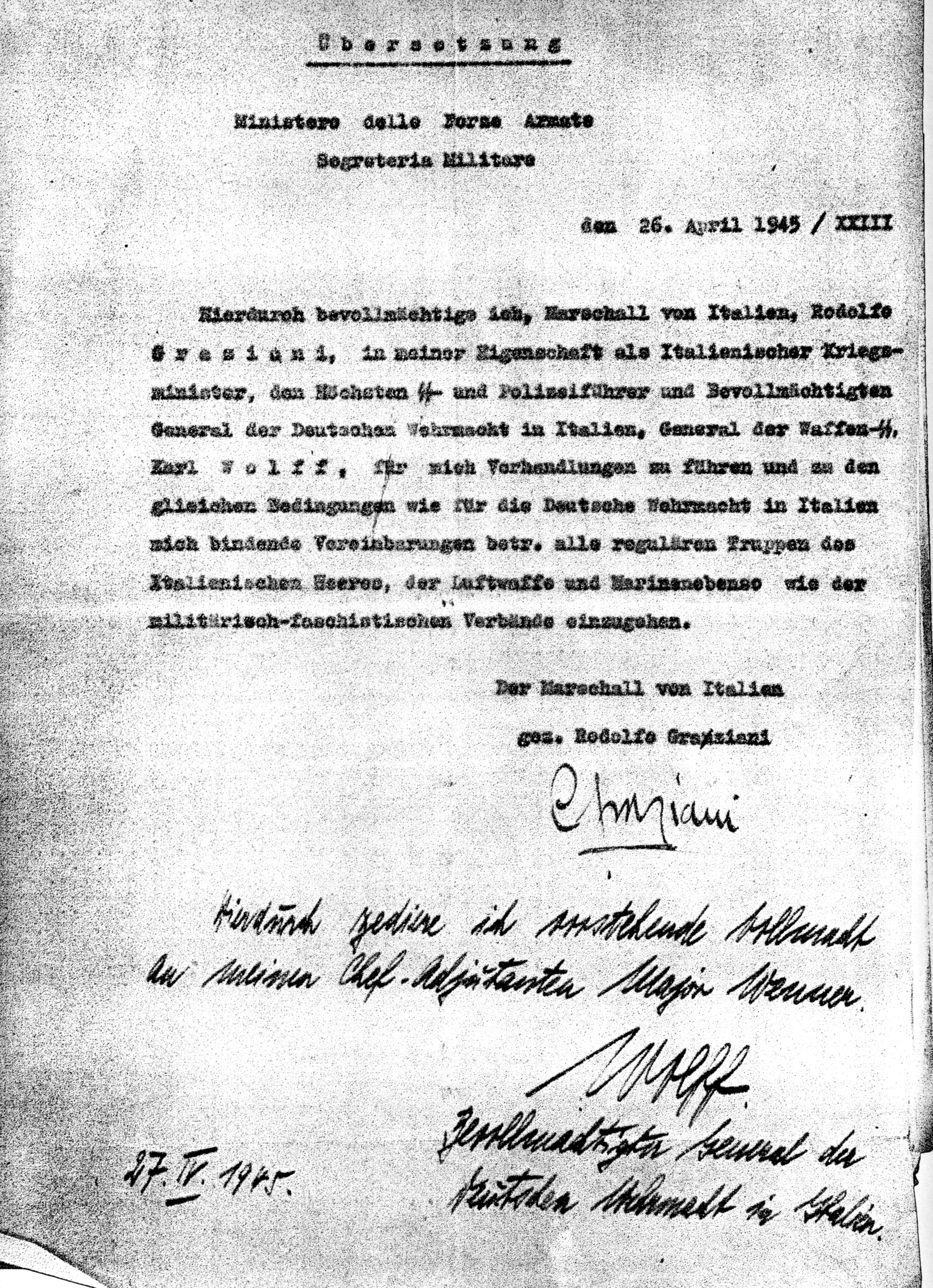
Graziani's proxy of surrender (in German)

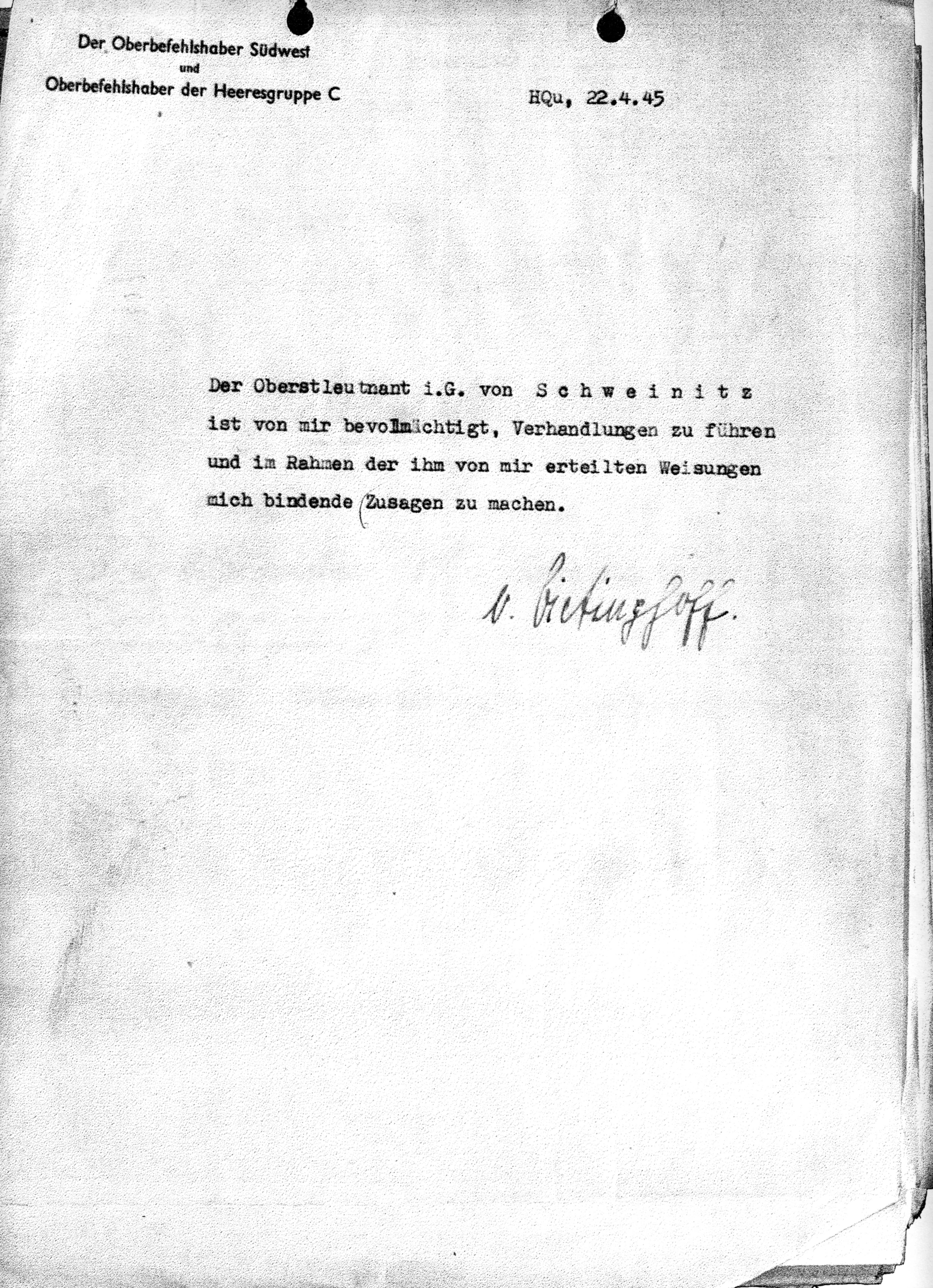
Vietinghoff's proxy of surrender

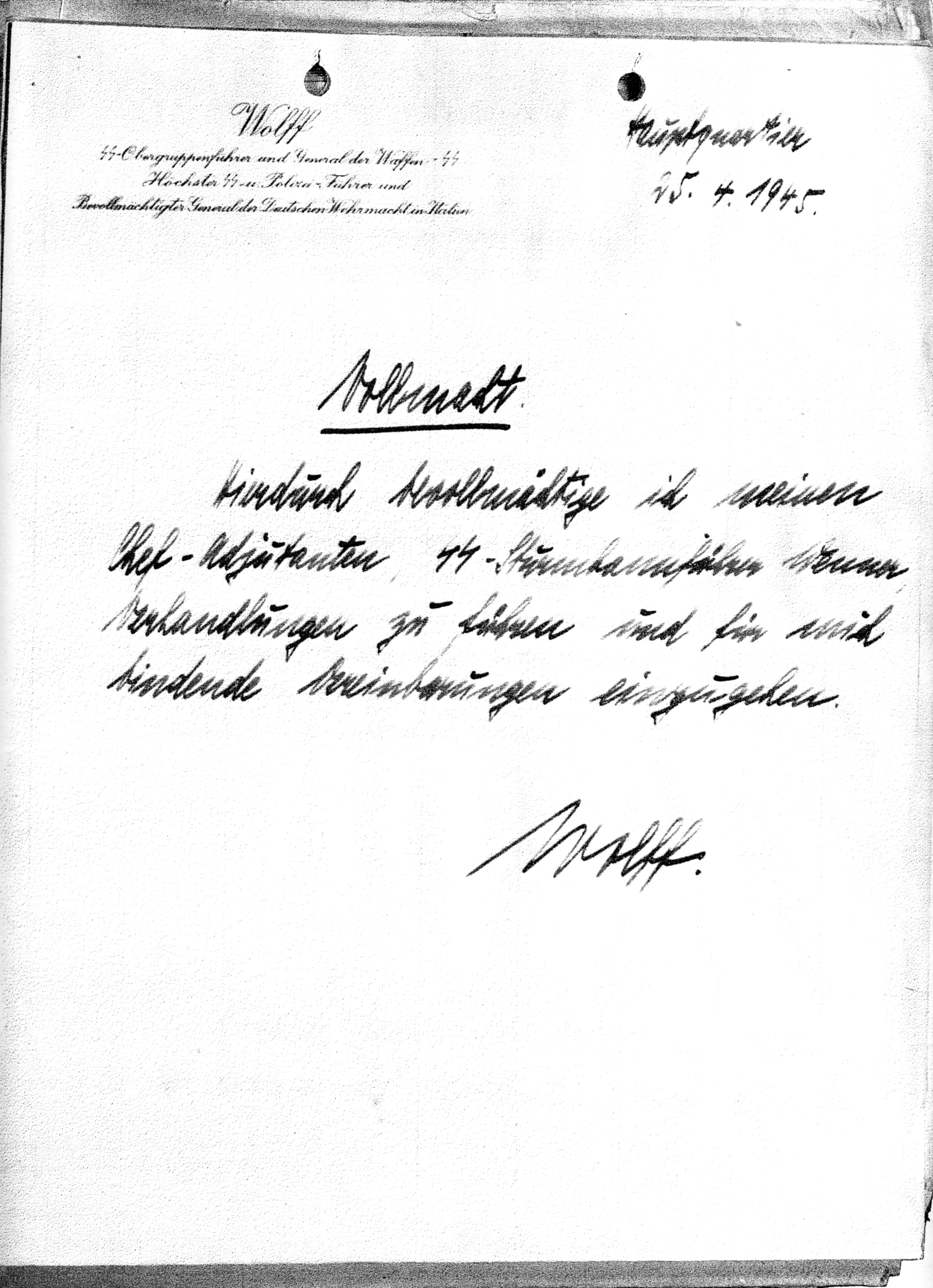
Wolff's proxy of surrender

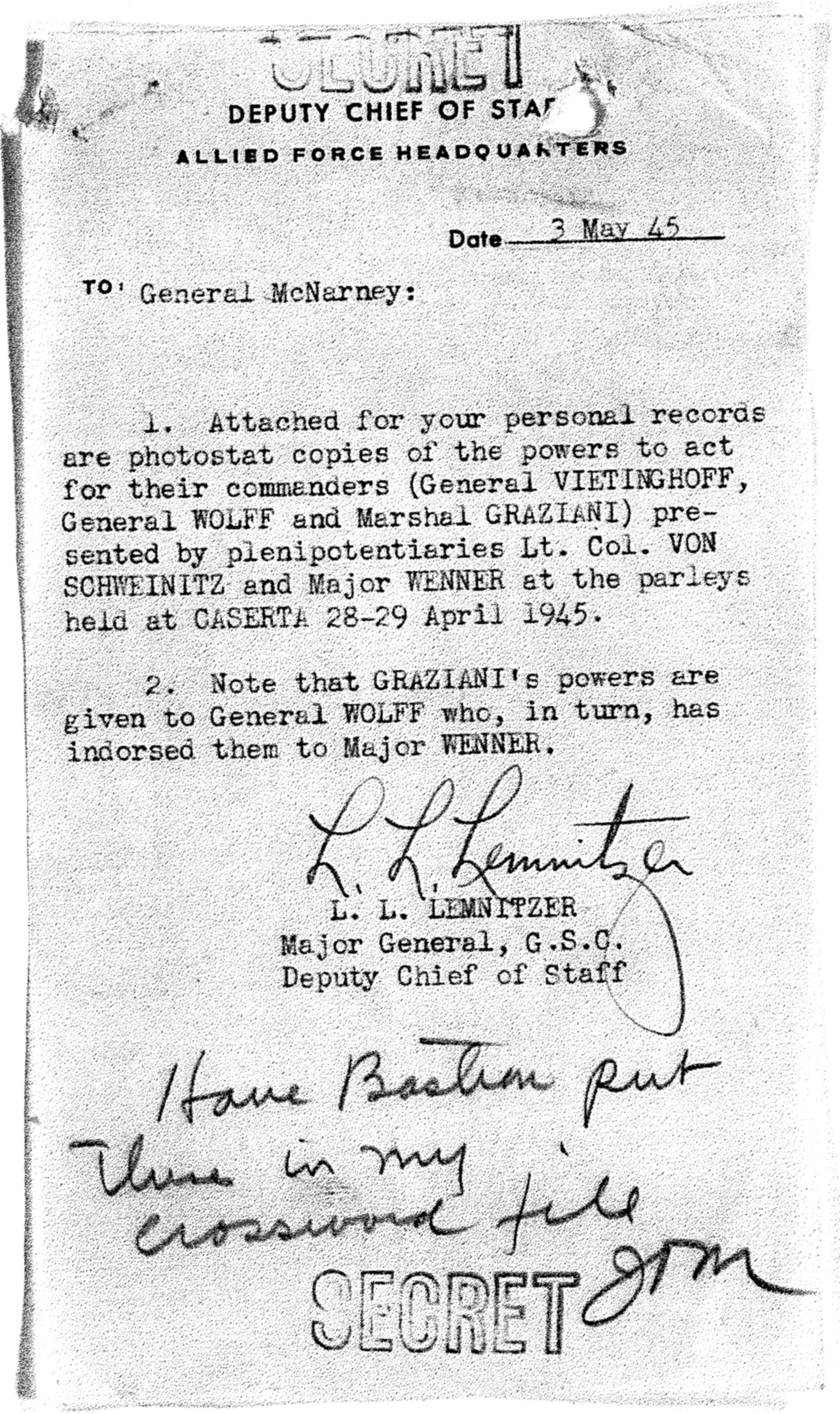
Recording of proxy for the photostat copies of the Axis commanders in Italy (Vietinghoff, Wolff, and Graziani)
