= Lauris Norstad =

United States Air Force general (1907–1988)

- General Lauris Norstad
- Born: March 24, 1907; Minneapolis, Minnesota, U.S.
- Died: September 12, 1988 (aged 81); Tucson, Arizona, U.S.
- Burial place: Arlington National Cemetery
- Military career
- Allegiance: United States
- Branch: United States Army; United States Air Force
- Service years: 1930–1947 (Army); 1947–1963 (Air Force)
- Rank: General
- Commands: Supreme Allied Commander Europe
- Conflicts: World War II; Korean War; Vietnam War
- Awards: Air Force Distinguished Service Medal (2); Army Distinguished Service Medal; Silver Star; Legion of Merit (2); Air Medal; French Legion of Honor

Lauris Norstad (March 24, 1907 – September 12, 1988) was an American general officer in the United States Army and United States Air Force during the Cold War.

== Early life and military career ==
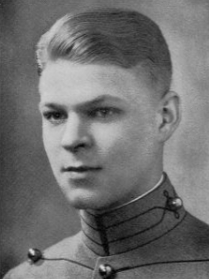
As a West Point cadet

Lauris Norstad was born in Minneapolis, Minnesota to Martin and Marie Norstad. Martin Norstad, a Lutheran minister, was born in Iowa to Norwegian immigrants from Rogaland. Lauris earned his high school diploma from Red Wing's Central High School in 1925.

He was appointed to the United States Military Academy from 3rd Congressional District of Minnesota, graduating on June 12, 1930. Upon graduation, he was commissioned a second lieutenant of the Army cavalry. In September 1930, he entered Primary Flying School at March Field, California, and graduated from Advanced Flying School and was transferred to the Air Corps in June 1931. Going to Schofield Barracks, Hawaii, in January 1932, he was assigned to the 18th Pursuit Group, assuming command of it in July 1933. In March 1936 he was named adjutant of the Ninth Bomb Group there. Entering the "short course" the Air Corps Tactical School at Maxwell Field, Alabama, in September 1939, he graduated three months later and returned to Mitchel Field as officer in charge of the 9th Bomb Group Navigation School.

Moving to Langley Field, Virginia, in July 1940, Norstad was adjutant of the 25th Bomb Group, and the following November he was named assistant chief of staff for intelligence of General Headquarters Air Force there. In February 1942 he was appointed a member of the Advisory Council to the commanding general of the Army Air Forces at Washington, DC.

== World War II ==
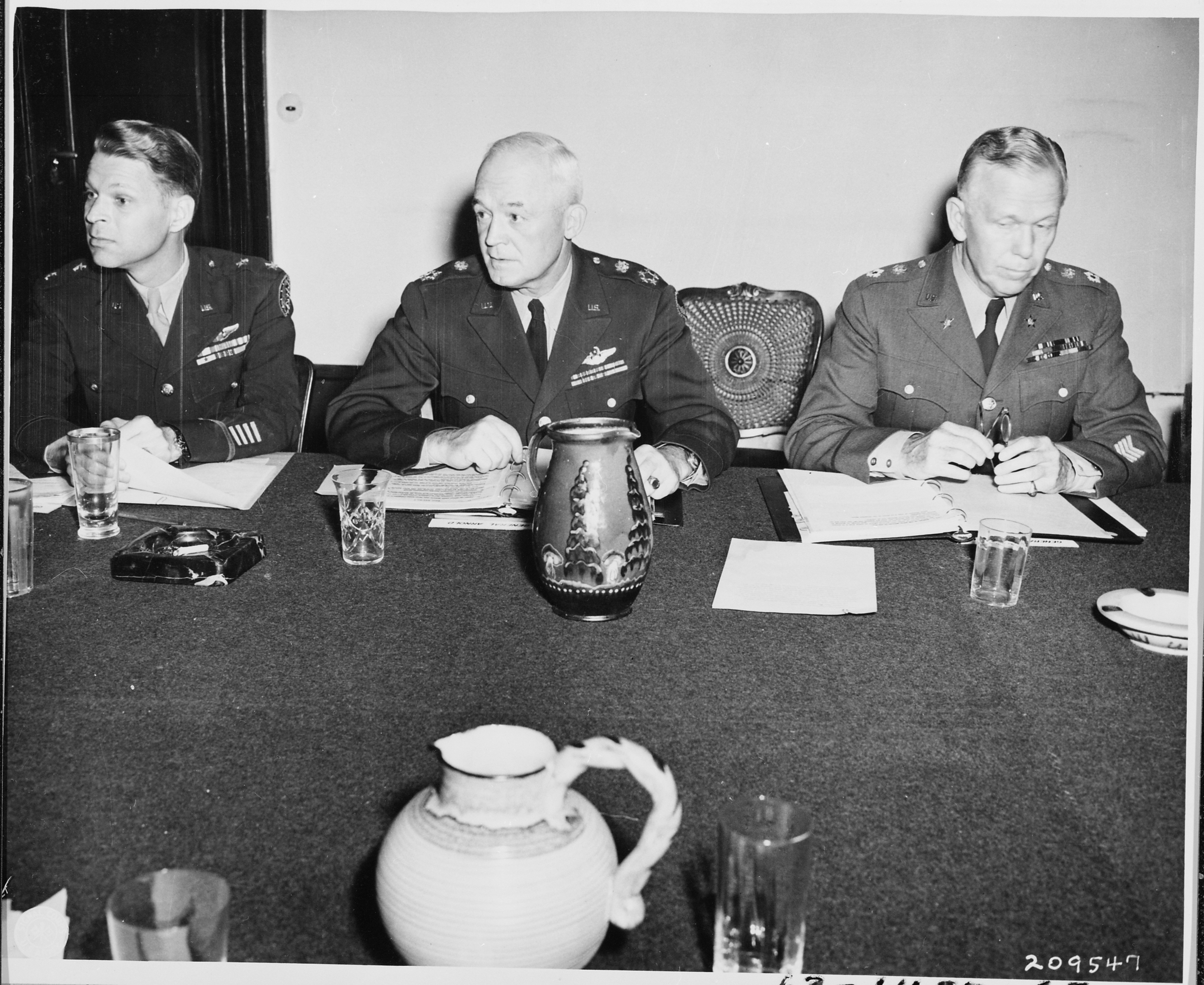
Major General Lauris Norstad with General of the Army George C. Marshall and General of the (then) Army Air Forces "Hap" Arnold during the Potsdam Conference in Germany, July 21, 1945

In August 1942, Norstad was named assistant chief of staff for operations (A-3) of the Twelfth Air Force, going to England with it the following month in support of Operation Husky, and to Algiers, North Africa in October 1942. Here he met General Dwight Eisenhower, who said of him: "It was on that occasion that I first met Lieutenant Colonel Lauris Norstad, a young air officer who so impressed me by his alertness, grasp of problems, and personality that I never thereafter lost sight of him. He was and is one of those rare men whose capacity knows no limit." During his time in North Africa, future atomic strike commander Paul Tibbets was briefly on his staff. In his autobiography, Tibbets claimed that he embarrassed Norstad in a strike planning meeting by being critical of his decision to bomb a target at low altitude, offering to lead it himself at 6000 feet if Norstad would fly with him as co-pilot, and Norstad was in the process of having him court-martialled before General Jimmy Doolittle got Tibbets transferred back to the US before Norstad could sink his career. Tibbets also claimed that Norstad was a "social climber" and political animal in the Air Force and that he aligned himself tightly with Hoyt Vandenberg and followed him up the chain of command.

In February 1943, he was promoted to brigadier general and assumed the additional duty of assistant chief of staff for operations of the Northwest African Air Forces. In December 1943 he was appointed director of operations of the Mediterranean Allied Air Forces at Algiers, moving with it to Caserta, Italy, two months later.

Norstad was transferred to Washington, D.C. in August 1944, where he was deputy chief of Air Staff at Army Air Force Headquarters with added duty as chief of staff of the 20th Air Force. He was relieved of this additional duty May 8, 1945, and assumed additional duty as assistant chief of Air Staff for Plans at Army Air Force Headquarters. He was promoted to major general the following month. Relieved of his assignment as chief of staff of the 20th Air Force in February 1946, he continued as assistant chief of air staff for plans until the following June, when he was appointed director of the Plans and Operations Division of the War Department at Washington, DC.

On October 1, 1947, following the division of the War Department into the Departments of the Army and Air Force, Norstad transferred to the Air Force and was appointed deputy chief of staff for operations of the Air Force, and the following May assumed additional duty as acting vice chief of staff of the Air Force.

== SHAPE leadership ==
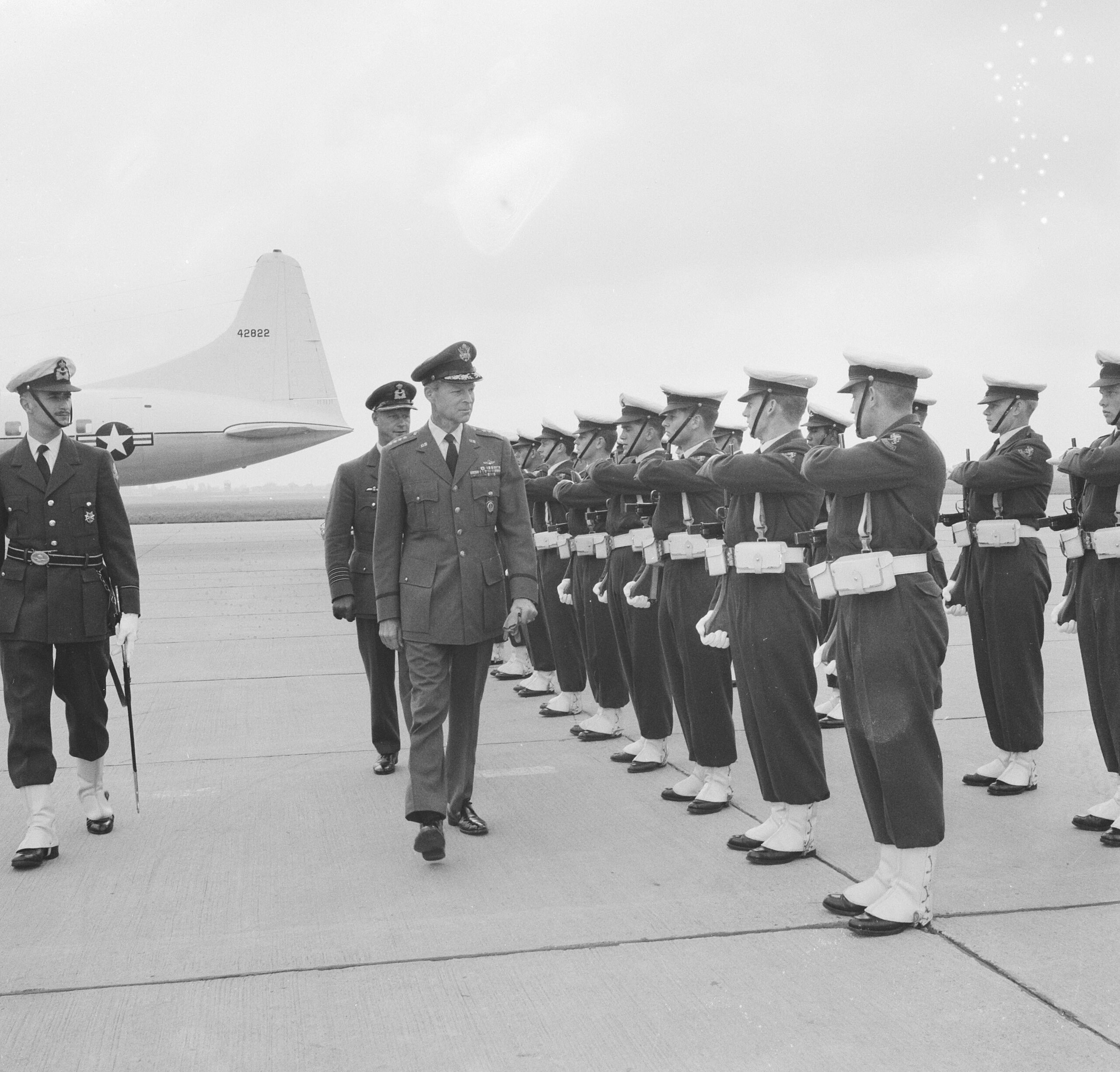
Norstad inspecting troops during a visit to The Hague, Netherlands, July 11, 1961

Joining the U.S. Air Forces in Europe in October 1950 General Norstad was commander in chief, U.S. Air Forces in Europe, with headquarters at Wiesbaden, Germany. On April 2, 1951 he assumed additional duty as commanding general of the Allied Air Forces in Central Europe under the Supreme Headquarters of the Allied Powers in Europe. He was designated air deputy to the Supreme Allied Commander Europe, on July 27, 1953.

After serving as air deputy to the Supreme Allied Commander, Europe (SACEUR) on November 20, 1956, Norstad was appointed as Supreme Allied Commander Europe, and commander in chief of U.S. European Command, the first Air Force officer to hold these posts. He served in the top post for European Command until November 1, 1962 and as SACEUR until December 31, 1962 when General Lyman Lemnitzer replaced him after his resignation over a disagreement with the withdrawal by President Kennedy of SACEUR's authority to decide on the use of tactical nuclear forces. Norstad initially encouraged France to develop its own nuclear capacity, but then abandoned the idea once he grew disillusioned with French President Charles de Gaulle's interference with NATO.

== Later years ==
General Norstad retired from the USAF on January 2, 1963. After his military retirement, he became the Chief Executive Officer and President of Owens Corning from 1963 until 1972 and also served on the Board of Directors of Rand Corporation. Norstad was critical of the Vietnam War, and in 1967 proposed a halt to the bombing of North Vietnam, a unilateral ceasefire, and an end to American reinforcements sent to South Vietnam, followed by a summit to negotiate a treaty. He died on September 12, 1988, and was buried at Arlington National Cemetery, in Arlington, Virginia.

== Awards and decorations ==
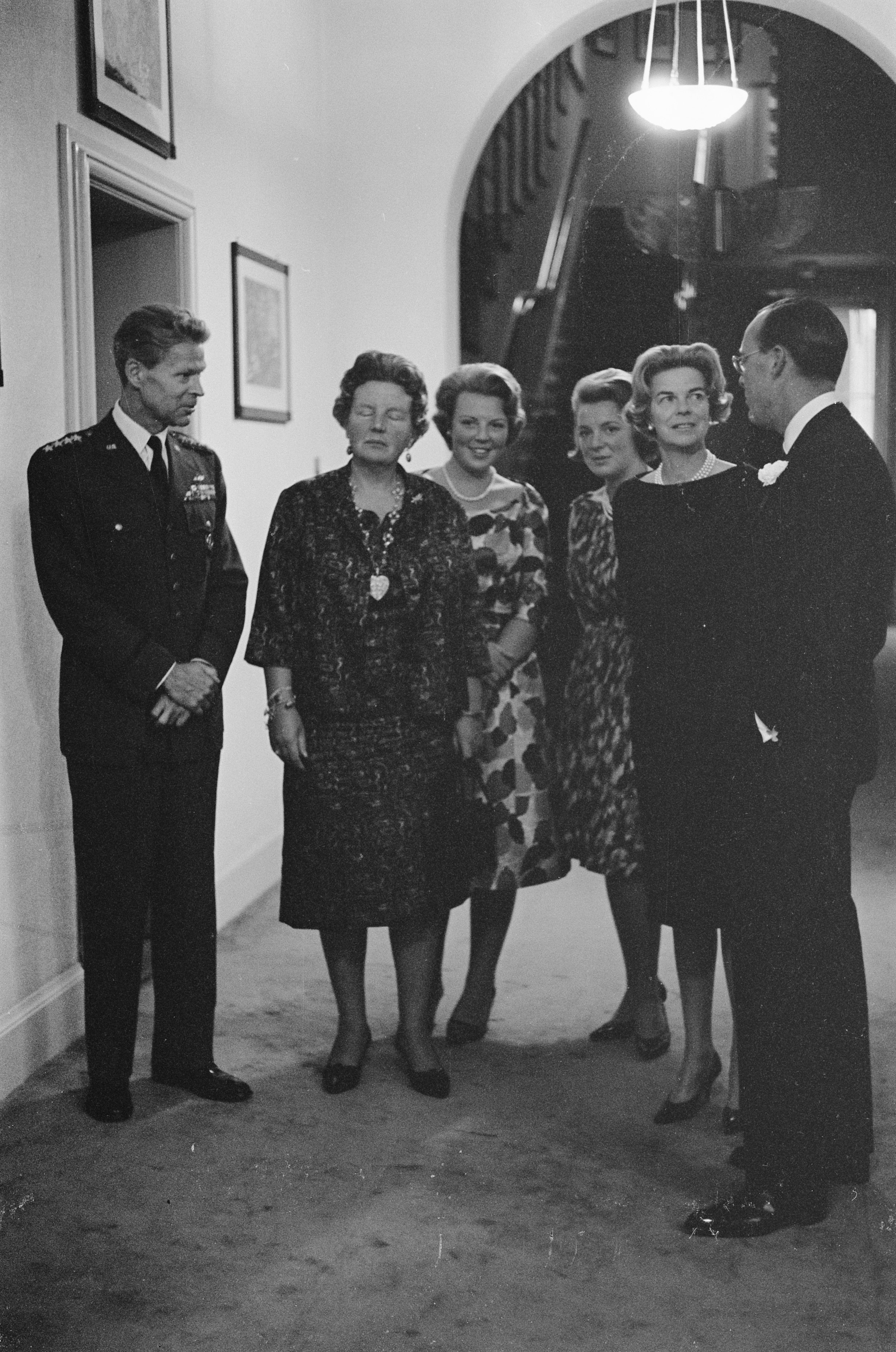
Norstad with Prince Bernhard and Queen Juliana of the Netherlands during a visit to Soestdijk, Netherlands on September 10, 1962

General Norstad's military awards included the following:

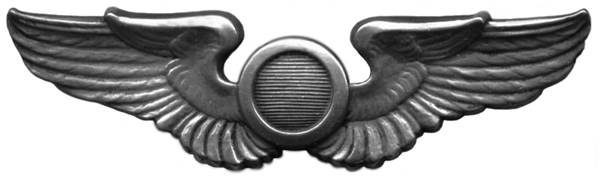
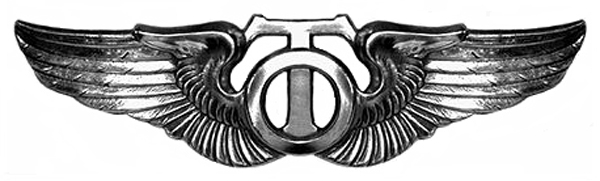
US Air Force Command Pilot Badge
US Army Air Forces Combat Observer Badge
US Army Air Forces Technical Observer Badge

Army Distinguished Service Medal with two bronze oak leaf clusters (one of the three medals was awarded by the Air Force)
Silver Star
Legion of Merit with oak leaf cluster
Air Medal
American Defense Service Medal with one bronze service star
American Campaign Medal
European-African-Middle Eastern Campaign Medal with four service stars
World War II Victory Medal
Army of Occupation Medal with "Germany" clasp
National Defense Service Medal
Order of the British Empire (Great Britain)
French Legion of Honor, Grand Cross (awarded by General Charles de Gaulle)
Croix de Guerre with bronze palm (France), WWII

== Effective dates of promotions ==
Rank	Date
Second Lieutenant	June 12, 1930
First Lieutenant	March 12, 1935
Captain	June 12, 1940
Major	July 15, 1941
Lieutenant Colonel	January 5, 1942
Colonel	July 23, 1942
Brigadier General	March 25, 1943
Major General	June 4, 1945
Lieutenant General	October 1, 1947
General	July 5, 1952

== See also ==
- List of commanders of USAFE

Military offices
Preceded by Sir Hugh Saunders	Air Deputy to SACEUR; 1953–1958	Succeeded by Leon W. Johnson
Preceded by Gen. Alfred Gruenther	Supreme Allied Commander Europe (NATO); 1956—1963	Succeeded by Gen. Lyman Lemnitzer
