= Luigi Parrilli =

Italian aristocrat

Baron Luigi Parrilli was an Italian aristocrat a native of Genoa, who took part in the negotiations between SS leaders and the CIA's future director, Allen Dulles, during Operation Sunrise.
