= Halima Krausen =

German Muslim leader and scholar

- Born: 1949 (age 76–77); Aachen, North Rhine-Westphalia, West Germany (now Germany)
- Known for: First female imam in Germany

Halima Krausen is a German Muslim theologian and scholar. Krausen served as an imam for the Islamic Centre of Hamburg following the resignation of Imam Mehdi Razvi in 1996. She held this position until 2014, and was Germany's first female imam.

== Biography ==
Krausen was born in 1949 in Aachen North Rhine-Westphalia, to a mixed Protestant and Catholic family. She converted to Islam in her early teens. Krausen studied Islam, comparative religion, and Christian theology in university and studied Islamic law, philosophy, and theology traditionally under Imam Mehdi Razvi. Krausen holds a traditional ijaza. She worked with a team of Muslim scholars on a translation and commentary of the Koran into German from 1984 to 1988. She also partially translated the hadith. Krausen was one of the founding members of the Inter-Religious Dialogue Center at the Department of Theology at Hamburg University, formed in 1985. in 1993, Krausen worked with the Initiative for Islamic Studies to develop Islamic curricula.

In 1996, Imam Mehdi Ravi appointed her as his successor. Krausen had previously acted as Razvi's assistant. In her role as imam, Krausen provided pastoral counseling and taught seminars about the Koran. Conscious of the concerns of the community and Islamic modesty regulations, Krausen wrote Friday sermons but did not lead mixed-gender prayers or act as the khatib.

== Works ==
- Darin sind Zeichen für Nachdenkende – Islamische Theologie – in sechzig Freitagspredigten homiletisch entfaltet. Verlag Traugott Bautz, Nordhausen 2009, ISBN 978-3-88309-515-8
- Entdeckungsreisen im Koran: Zwölf Lehrgespräche. With Mehdi Razvi and Pia Köppel. EB Verlag, Hamburg, 2009, ISBN 978-3930826759
- Licht über Licht: Die schönsten Gebete des Islam. Herder Spektrum, 2011, ISBN 978-3451064029
- Zeichen an den Horizonten – Zeichen in euch selbst – Freitagspredigten zum Nachdenken. Verlag Traugott Bautz, Nordhausen 2013, ISBN 978-3-88309-795-4
- Zeichen von Gottes Barmherzigkeit. Verlag Traugott Bautz, Nordhausen 2016, ISBN 978-3-95948-201-1
- Islam und Geschlechtergerechtigkeit. In: Zekirija Sejdini (Ed.): Islam in Europa: Begegnungen, Konflikte und Lösungen. Waxmann, Münster 2018, ISBN 978-3-8309-3809-5, S. 79–92
- Dialog in Transdifferenz – Transdifferenz im Dialog (Jerusalemer Texte, Band 23). Edited with Hans-Christoph Goßmann and Michaela Will. Verlag Traugott Bautz, Nordhausen 2019, ISBN 978-3-95948-408-4
