= Operation Sunrise (World War II) =

Secret negotiations between US and Germany

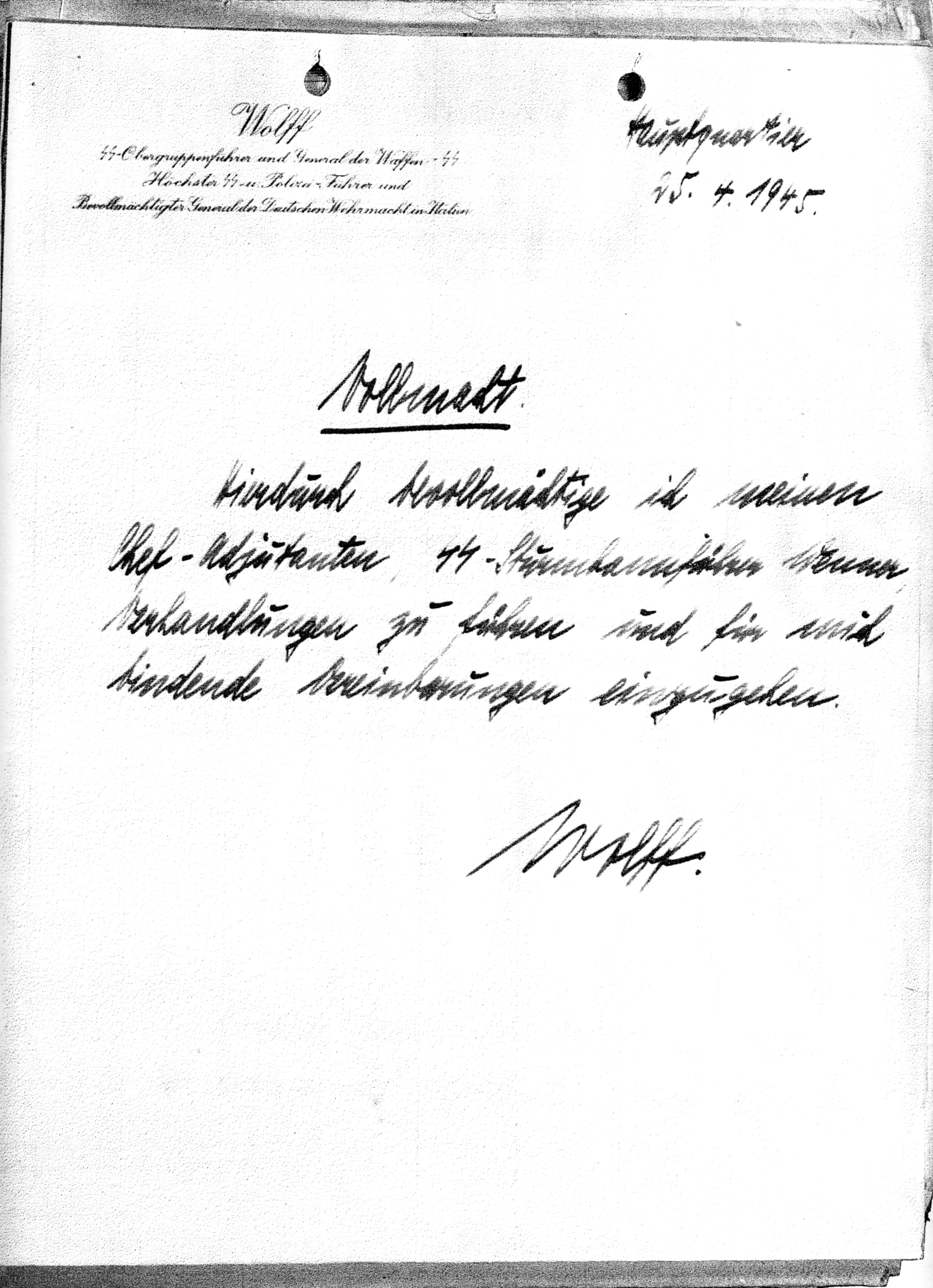
SS General Karl Wolff's Proxy of Surrender for northern Italy, 2 May 1945

Operation Sunrise (sometimes called the Berne incident) was a series of World War II secret negotiations from February to May 1945 between representatives of Nazi Germany and the United States to arrange a local surrender of German forces in northern Italy. Most of the meetings took place in the vicinity of Bern, Switzerland, and the lead negotiators were Waffen-SS General Karl Wolff and American OSS agent Allen Dulles. The meetings provoked Soviet suspicion that the Americans were seeking to sign a separate peace with the Germans and led to heated correspondence between Joseph Stalin and Franklin D. Roosevelt, an early episode of the emerging Cold War.

== Events ==
=== Prelude ===
During the Second World War, Allen Dulles was in charge of the Office of Strategic Services station attached to the American embassy in Bern from November 1942 onward, which he used as a base for launching intelligence operations. Dulles had a diplomatic cover, but he made little secret of his real work, and it was widely known due to a brief article in The New York Times published on 17 September 1942 stating that he was "being replaced as committee treasurer because of his war work with government Office of Strategic Services". The Office of Strategic Services was a newly founded agency, and it was not clear if it would be allowed to continue beyond the Second World War as the CIG (Central Intelligence Group), then later the CIA. The Army and Navy were both opposed to its existence (in fact, the OSS was disbanded in October 1945). The OSS chief, William Donovan, was lobbying very strongly for the OSS to be continued after the war, and as such OSS operatives were under strong pressure to achieve successes that might justify continuing the agency. Dulles for his part having accomplished very little during his three years in Bern was desperate for any sort of success that would allow him to end the war on a high note and justify the continued existence of the OSS.

=== Situation in Italy ===
In July 1943, following the Allied invasion of Sicily, Mussolini was arrested by order of King Victor Emmanuel III, provoking a civil war. Italy's military outside of the Italian Peninsula collapsed, its occupied and annexed territories falling under German control. Italy capitulated to the Allies on 3 September 1943.

The subsequent German occupation of northern Italy in September 1943 led to a guerrilla war being waged by Italian insurgent bands loyal to the National Liberation Committee (CLN) against the Germans and the forces of Fascist "Salò Republic". The majority of the Italian people considered the CLN rather than the rump government in Rome headed by the extremely unpopular King Victor Emmanuel III to be their legitimate government, much to the discomfort of the American and even more so the British government, who preferred to deal with the Rome government. On the night of 8–9 September 1943 when Operation Axis, the German occupation of Italy was launched, the king, instead of trying to rally his people, had issued only vague and contradictory orders in an unsigned document written in pencil and instead fled Rome under the cover of night. The king's lack of leadership on the night of 8–9 September had greatly aided the German occupation as the majority of Italian officers had no idea of what they were supposed to do, and fatally discredited the House of Savoy. The monarchy was especially unpopular in the north of Italy, where people felt that it was Victor Emmanuel who by his incompetence and cowardice was responsible for them having to endure an occupation by Nazi Germany. The collapse of living standards caused by the German occupation in the north had caused the Italian Communist Party, traditionally popular with the working classes in the industrial cities of northern Italy, to surge in appeal as many people in northern Italy wanted to see an utopian "people's republic" to be modelled after the Soviet Union (which was viewed in certain quarters in Italy as a land of freedom and equality) after the war. In Italy, a return to the pre-war order would mean a return to Fascism, leading to anti-Fascist Italians to argue that what was needed was a break with the past.

=== Operation Sunrise ===
Since the fall of 1944, the Red Army had been advancing up the Danube river valley and on 26 December 1944 the Battle of Budapest began, which ended with Budapest surrendering on 13 February 1945. After the fall of Budapest, the Red Army advance continued up the Danube river valley towards Vienna. The German forces in northern Italy were holding out against an Allied offensive in the Po river valley, waging a fierce defensive campaign, but an Allied bombing campaign had reduced their supplies coming down from the Brenner Pass to the minimum, making the German situation in Italy highly precarious. The initial purpose behind the talks in Switzerland, as proposed by Wolff, was not to have Army Group C surrender to the Allies, but rather to surrender northern Italy to the Allies in order to allow the 800,000 men of Army Group C to withdraw over the Brenner Pass to defend Vienna against the Red Army. On 23 February 1945, Dulles accepted Wolff's offer to explore terms of a local surrender. In an 8 March meeting in Lucerne organized by Swiss intelligence officer Max Waibel, Wolff offered the following plan: Army Group C goes into Germany, while Allied Forces Commander Harold Alexander advances in the direction of the South of France. Wolff believed at first that the Anglo-American acceptance of his plan just might break up the "Big Three" alliance of the Soviet Union, Great Britain and the United States.

Karl Wolff, the Higher SS Police Chief for Italy, had committed numerous war crimes during the struggle against the CLN guerrillas. With the defeat of Germany a certainty by early 1945, Wolff was looking for immunity for himself and the other SS and Wehrmacht officers in Italy. Aside from the war crimes committed against the Italian people during the anti-guerrilla war, Wolff had been deeply involved in the "Final Solution to the Jewish Question", as he triumphantly wrote in a letter to a friend in 1942 stating his "special joy that now five thousand of the Chosen People are going to Treblinka every day". For his part, Dulles wanted to see an orderly surrender in Italy, which would ensure the Allies, rather than the Italian guerrillas, many of whom belonged to the Italian Communist Party, would control northern Italy. Dulles rejected Wolff's demand that Army Group C be allowed to cross over to Austria to continue the war, insisting that the men of Army Group C surrender to the Allies, but also agreed that the men of Army Group C would surrender to the Allied armies rather than the guerrillas of CLN and be allowed to keep their weapons for an interim period after surrendering. The Wehrmacht leaders in Italy were only interested in Operation Sunrise as a means to move Army Group C into Austria, and once they learned that was not possible, they lost interest. Field Marshal Albert Kesselring, the departing German commander in Italy, told the new commander Heinrich von Vietinghoff: "...that an end to the fighting will not be considered at all as long as the Führer is still alive". In reality, the negotiations in Switzerland led nowhere because General Vietinghoff was opposed to any "premature" surrender, as he was keenly aware of the Dolchstoßlegende and did not want to be blamed for any new "stab-in-the-back".

On 12 March the U.S. ambassador in the USSR, W. Averell Harriman, notified Vyacheslav Molotov of the possibility of Wolff's arrival in Lugano to conduct negotiations on the German army's surrender in Italy. On the same day, Molotov replied that the Soviet government would not object to talks between American and British officers and the German general, provided that representatives of Soviet Military Command could also take part in them. However, on 16 March the Soviet side was informed that its representatives would not be allowed to take part in negotiations with Wolff. Meanwhile, on 15 and 19 March, Wolff discussed details of how an actual surrender would proceed with American general Lyman Lemnitzer and British general Terence Airey.

=== Denial ===
Roosevelt denied that there were any negotiations for surrender taking place in Switzerland. Dulles, however appears to have made, apparently at his own discretion, a verbal agreement to protect SS General Wolff from prosecution at the Nuremberg Trials as they worked out details of surrender. Although Switzerland was neutral during World War II, the Swiss intelligence officer Max Waibel and the school director Max Husmann arranged for the meetings. British Prime Minister Winston Churchill was following the discussion closely, and said he believed that "misunderstandings" with the Soviets were resolved with Roosevelt's death on 12 April. Churchill cynically referred to the negotiations as Operation Crossword, apparently because he found them puzzling. In spite of warnings from other officials that he was violating the Casablanca agreement that called for all dealings with Axis members to be on terms of unconditional surrender, Dulles worked supportively with Wolff, determined to end the war before the "communists" reached Trieste. The American historian Gerhard Weinberg wrote: "The whole 'Sunrise' episode reflects very badly on the judgement of Allen Dulles who allowed himself to get carried away—and over JCS orders—by prospects of a great coup".

=== Repercussions ===
On 22 March Molotov, in his letter to the American ambassador, wrote that

for two weeks, in Bern, behind the back of the Soviet Union, negotiations between representatives of the German Military Command on one side and representatives of American and British Command on the other side are conducted. The Soviet government considers this absolutely inadmissible."

This led to Roosevelt's letter to Stalin on 25 March and Stalin's reply on 29 March.

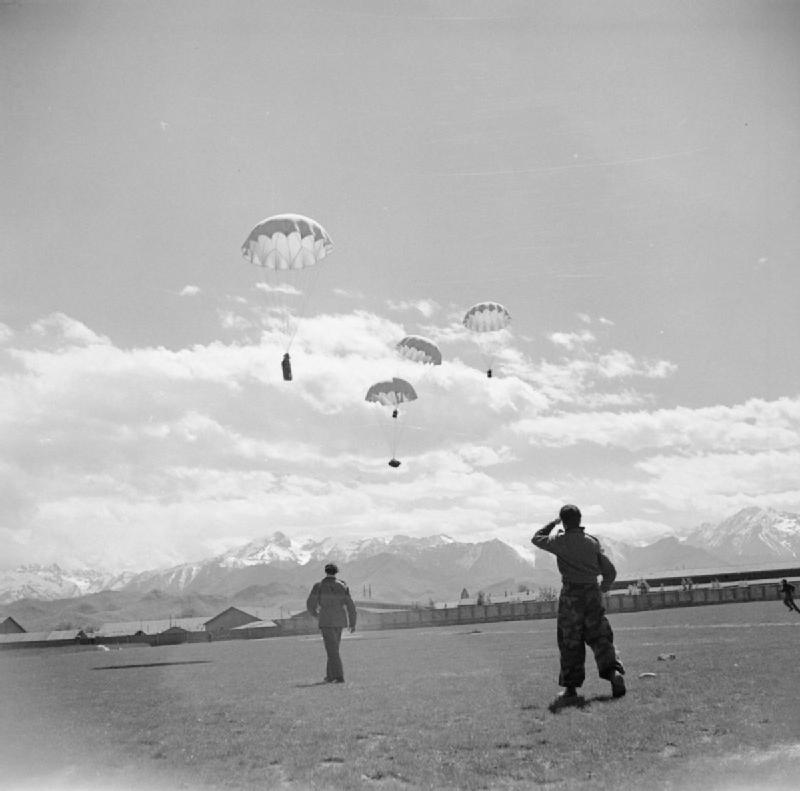
British Aid To Partisans in Northern Italy, April – May 1945. The Western Allies' protection of Karl Wolff threatened to bring them into conflict with the Partisans.

=== Aftermath ===
President Harry Truman officially closed down talks with the Germans in Switzerland, and made sure that a Soviet general was represented at the talks in Caserta, Italy that finalized the surrender of the entire force. Nonetheless, fallout from the incident seems to have discouraged full Soviet participation in the founding United Nations conference later that month.

Wolff and his forces were being considered to help implement Operation Unthinkable, a secret plan to invade the Soviet Union which Winston Churchill advocated during this period. Wolff was later proven to be complicit in the murder of 300,000 Jews. On 26 April, the SS general was captured by Italian partisans, but was rescued by Dulles' Office of Strategic Services (OSS) and Swiss intelligence. Despite Wolff's promises to Dulles in Bern made in March, Vietinghoff stalled for as long as possible about surrendering, only permitting Wolff to sign the instrument of surrender on 29 April 1945.

The actual surrender in Italy was signed on 29 April 1945 agreeing to a cessation of hostilities on 2 May. Wolff justified his actions to Berlin officials by explaining that the agreement had pre-empted "a Communist uprising" in northern Italy. Wolff and his officers were not interned at this time, but instead celebrated the resolution at Gestapo headquarters in Bolzano for several days with Allied commanders. The Americans had to periodically repel partisans who attempted to seize the Germans. Victory in Europe Day occurred on 8 May.

In 1979, the economist John Kenneth Galbraith, who had known Dulles when Dulles served as the CIA director in the 1950s, wrote that over the course of 1960–1961 Dulles showed himself

"a master of disastrous ineptitude. In those months he sent Gary Powers over the Paris Summit, helped overthrow the neutralist government of Souvanna Phouma in Laos (which later had to be restored) and was the man in charge of the organization that was responsible for perhaps the greatest foul-up in our history, the Bay of Pigs...Never, not even in the Bay of Pigs, was his capacity for detached misjudgment more disastrous than in his management of Operation Sunrise, as the Wolff negotiations were called...He wanted to go out with a bang. Those who have thought he was foreseeing the Cold War and those who thought he was helping to cause it were both wrong. He was just being Allen Dulles."

== In popular culture ==
- Dulles later recounted the events of Sunrise in his book, The Secret Surrender (1966).
- Operation Sunrise was dramatized in Seventeen Moments of Spring, a Soviet historical TV series, which called it "Operation Sunrise Crossword".

== Bibliography ==
- Smith, Bradley F.; Agarossi, Elena (1979). Operation Sunrise: The Secret Surrender. New York: Basic Books. ISBN 0-465-05290-8.
- Lingen, Kerstin von (2013). Allen Dulles, the OSS, and Nazi War Criminals: The Dynamics of Selective Prosecution. Cambridge University Press. ISBN 9781107025936.
- "Analysis of the Name File of Guido Zimmer". Records of the Central Intelligence Agency – Records of the Directorate of Operations.
- "Insidious Moments of the Victorious Spring". Soviet Russia (in Russian). Archived from the original on October 28, 2006.
- "They Are Honest and Modest People..." SVR (in Russian). April 15, 2000.
- Stephen P. Halbrook: Operation Sunrise Retrieved 2011-12-26
- CIA: OSS Secrete Intelligence Branch and Operation Sunrise Retrieved 2011-12-26
- Operation Sunrise chapter in "From Hitler's Doorstep – The Wartime Intelligence Reports of Allen Dulles 1942–1945" Retrieved 2011-12-26
- Mack Smith, Denis (1989). Italy and Its Monarchy. New Haven: Yale University Press. ISBN 0300051328.
- Polmar, Norman; Allen, Thomas (1998). The Spy Book The Encyclopedia of Espionage. New York: Random House. ISBN 0-375-70249-0.
- Rossé Christian, Guerre secrète en Suisse, 1939–1945, Paris, 2015, p. 134.
- Sara Randell: Ending the War, Operation Sunrise and Max Husmann, Stämplfi Verlag, Bern 2018
- Weinberg, Gerhard (2005). A World In Arms: A Global History of World War Two. Cambridge: Cambridge University Press. ISBN 9780521618267.
