= Karl Wolff =

SS general (1900–1984)

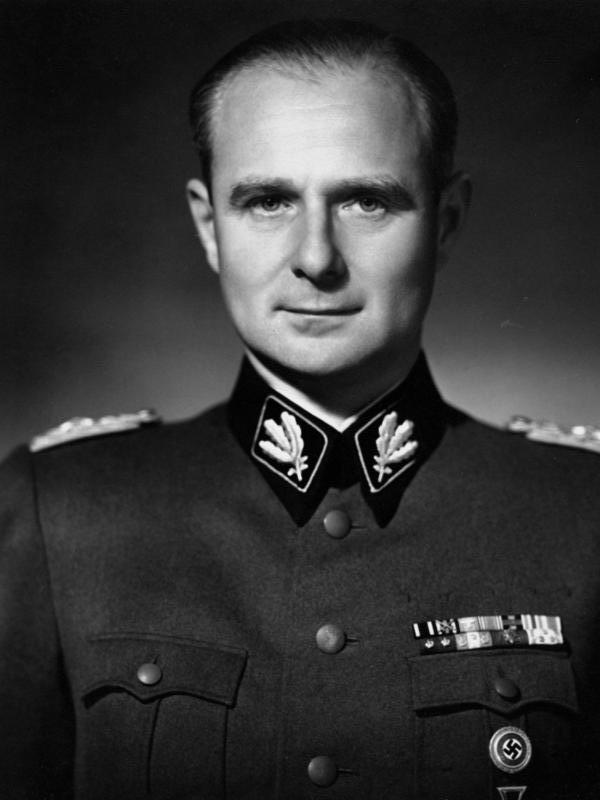
- Wolff in 1937
- Born: Karl Friedrich Otto Wolff; 13 May 1900; Darmstadt, Grand Duchy of Hesse, German Empire
- Died: 16 July 1984 (aged 84); Rosenheim, Bavaria, West Germany
- Relatives: Fatima Grimm (daughter)
- Military career
- Allegiance: German Empire; Nazi Germany
- Service years: 1917–1918; 1931–1945
- Rank: SS-Obergruppenführer and General of the Waffen-SS
- Unit: Schutzstaffel
- Commands: Chief, Personal Staff Reichsführer-SS; Supreme SS and Police Leader, occupied Italy
- Conflicts: World War I World War II
- Awards: Iron Cross, 1st and 2nd class Clasp to the Iron Cross, 1st and 2nd class German Cross in Gold

Karl Friedrich Otto Wolff (13 May 1900 – 16 July 1984) was a senior German Schutzstaffel (SS) officer who served as Chief of Personal Staff Reichsführer-SS (Heinrich Himmler) and an SS liaison to Adolf Hitler during World War II. He ended the war as the Supreme SS and Police Leader in occupied Italy and helped arrange for the early surrender of Axis forces in that theatre, effectively ending the war there several days sooner than in the rest of Europe. He escaped prosecution at the Nuremberg Trials as a result of his participation in Operation Sunrise. In 1962, Wolff was arrested in West Germany and prosecuted for the deportation of Polish Jews. In 1964, he was sentenced to 15 years in prison for being an accessory to murder. He was released in 1971 and died 13 years later.

== Early life and career ==
Karl Friedrich Otto Wolff was born the son of a wealthy district court judge in Darmstadt on 13 May 1900. During World War I he graduated from school in 1917, volunteered to join the Imperial German Army (Leibgarde-Infanterie-Regiment Nr. 115), and served on the Western Front. He rose to the rank of lieutenant and was awarded both the Iron Cross second class and first class.

After the war, Wolff was forced to leave the army because of the reduction of the German armed forces following the terms imposed by the Treaty of Versailles. Wolff was in the paramilitary Freikorps from December 1918 to May 1920. He started a two-year apprenticeship at the Bethmann Bank in Frankfurt and married Frieda von Römheld in 1923. The couple moved to Munich, where Wolff worked for Deutsche Bank. In June 1924, he was laid off and joined a public relations firm. Wolff may also have studied law, but never took any state examinations. In 1925, he started his own public relations company which he operated in Munich until 1933.

== Nazi Party and SS ==
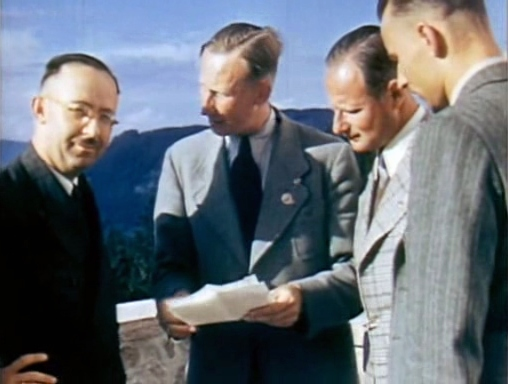
Left to right: Heinrich Himmler, Reinhard Heydrich, Karl Wolff, Hermann Esser at the Berghof, May 1939

Wolff joined the Nazi Party with card number 695,131 and the Schutzstaffel (SS) in October 1931. His SS membership number was 14,235 and he was commissioned as an SS-Sturmführer in February 1932.

From March 1933, after the Nazi Party had obtained national power, Wolff served as an adjutant to Franz Ritter von Epp, then-governor of Bavaria. Here he came to the attention of the head of the SS Heinrich Himmler who appointed Wolff his personal adjutant in June 1933. In March 1936, Wolff was elected as a deputy to the Reichstag from electoral constituency 33 (Hesse-Darmstadt). Reelected in April 1938, he retained this seat until the fall of the Nazi regime in May 1945.

In 1936, Himmler named Wolff chief of Personal Staff Reichsführer-SS to coordinate all contact and correspondence within the SS at both party and state levels. By managing Himmler's affairs with the SS, the Nazi Party, state agencies and personnel, the eloquent and well mannered Wolff rose to become one of the key figures in Himmler's power regime. In addition, Wolff oversaw the economic investments made by the SS, was responsible for saving funds among Himmler's circle of friends and for connections to the SS organizations Ahnenerbe and Lebensborn. In 1939 he retroactively became head of the Main Office and SS liaison officer to Hitler. In 1936, Wolff left the Protestant Church. On 30 January 1937, he was promoted to the rank of SS-Gruppenführer (major general).

== World War II ==
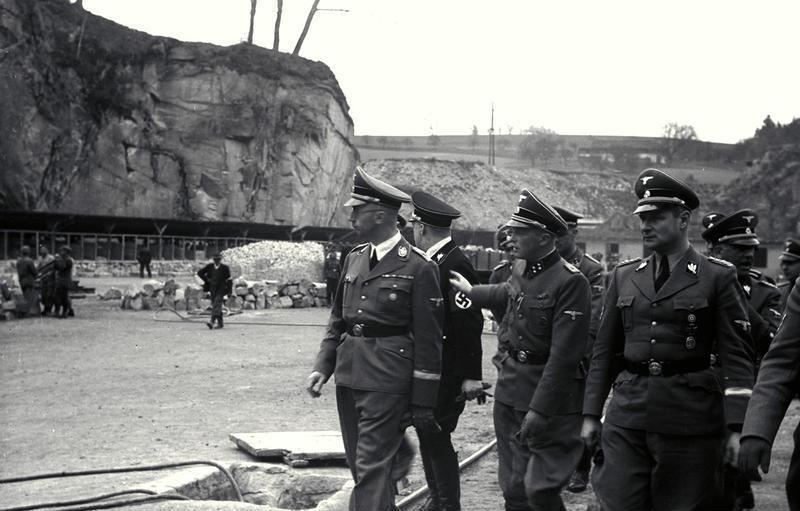
Himmler, Franz Ziereis and Wolff at Mauthausen-Gusen concentration camp (April 1941)

As was later revealed in the 1964 trial, during the early part of the Second World War, Wolff served as "Himmler's eyes and ears" in Hitler's headquarters. He would have been aware of significant events or could easily have access to the relevant information. Apart from the information passing across his desk, Wolff received (as Chief of Himmler's Personal Staff) copies of all letters from SS officers, and his friends at this point included Odilo Globocnik, the organiser of Operation Reinhard (in effect 1941 to 1943).

Incriminating letters show that Wolff was involved in the Holocaust. On 8 September 1939, shortly after the invasion of Poland, Wolff wrote to the Gestapo office in Frankfurt (Oder) and ordered the immediate "arrest of all male Jews of Polish nationality and their family members" and the confiscation of any wealth. In 1942 Wolff oversaw the deportation transports during "Grossaktion Warschau", the mass extermination of Jews from the Warsaw Ghetto. When rail-transport bottlenecks occurred, Wolff communicated repeatedly with Reich Railway Director Albert Ganzenmüller. In a letter sent from the Führer Headquarters, dated 13 August 1942 and referring to transports of Jews to Treblinka extermination camp, Wolff thanked Ganzenmüller for his assistance:

I note with particular pleasure from your communication that a train with 5,000 members of the chosen people has been running daily for 14 days and that we are accordingly in a position to continue with this population movement at an accelerated pace. I have taken the initiative to seek out the offices involved, so that a smooth implementation of the named measures appears to be guaranteed. I thank you once again for the effort and at the same time wish to ask you to continue monitoring these things. With best wishes and Heil Hitler, yours sincerely W.

— Karl Wolff to Albert Ganzenmüller, 13 August 1942,

According to Erich von dem Bach-Zelewski, in August 1941, Himmler and Wolff attended the shooting of Jews at Minsk which had been organized by Arthur Nebe, who was in command of Einsatzgruppe B, a mobile killing unit. Nauseated and shaken by the experience, Himmler decided that alternative methods of killing should be found. On Himmler's orders, by the spring of 1942, the camp at Auschwitz had been greatly expanded, including by the addition of gas chambers, where victims were killed using the pesticide Zyklon B.

After the assassination of Reinhard Heydrich in June 1942, Wolff developed a strong rivalry with other SS leaders, particularly with Heydrich's successor at the Reich Security Main Office (Reichssicherheitshauptamt or RSHA), Ernst Kaltenbrunner, and with Walter Schellenberg of the foreign intelligence service in the RSHA. His position was weakened by his frequent absences from Berlin, in part due to his suffering from pyelitis and renal calculus (kidney stones), which required surgery. Wolff fell out of favour with Himmler and was dismissed as his chief of staff. In April 1943, he was relieved of his duties as liaison officer to Hitler. Himmler announced he would temporarily take over Wolff's duties. A new replacement as liaison officer to Hitler's HQ did not occur until the appointment of Hermann Fegelein, who assumed the duty in January 1944. Wolff had particularly angered Himmler by his divorce and remarriage in March 1943. Himmler, who believed the family to be the nucleus of the SS, had denied Wolff permission to divorce, but Wolff had turned directly to Hitler. Himmler still appears to have considered Wolff a loyal member of the SS, for in September 1943 Wolff was transferred to Italy as Supreme SS and Police Leader.

In that position, Wolff shared responsibility for standard police functions such as security, maintenance of prisons, supervision of concentration camps and forced-labor camps, as well as the deportation of forced laborers with Wilhelm Harster, who was the Commander in Chief of the Security Police. When Wolff became Plenipotentiary General of the German Wehrmacht in July 1944, he also became responsible for anti-partisan warfare in occupied Italy. By now Wolff commanded the police and the entire rear army in Italy. So far Wolff's involvement in war crimes in Italy remains largely unclear, partially because source material on the degree to which SS units participated in Nazi security warfare is lacking. Although it seems as if US investigators were in possession of incriminating material in 1945 that indicated Wolff's approval of the executions that became known as the Ardeatine massacre, this evidence was deemed not sufficient for criminal charges. On 29 May 1944, Wolff received the Clasp to the Iron Cross, 1st and 2nd class, and on 9 December 1944, he was awarded the German Cross in Gold for using Italian units, with secondary German units, to destroy partisans and for the "maintenance of war production in the Italian territory". During this period he approved the project of the Marnate's Bunker, close to the German command of Olgiate Olona. By 1945 Wolff was acting military commander of Italy. The OSS Art Lootiing Investigation Unit thought that Wolff had a role in looting Italian art collections, writing that he was "responsible for the removal to German territory of Italian public and private collections."

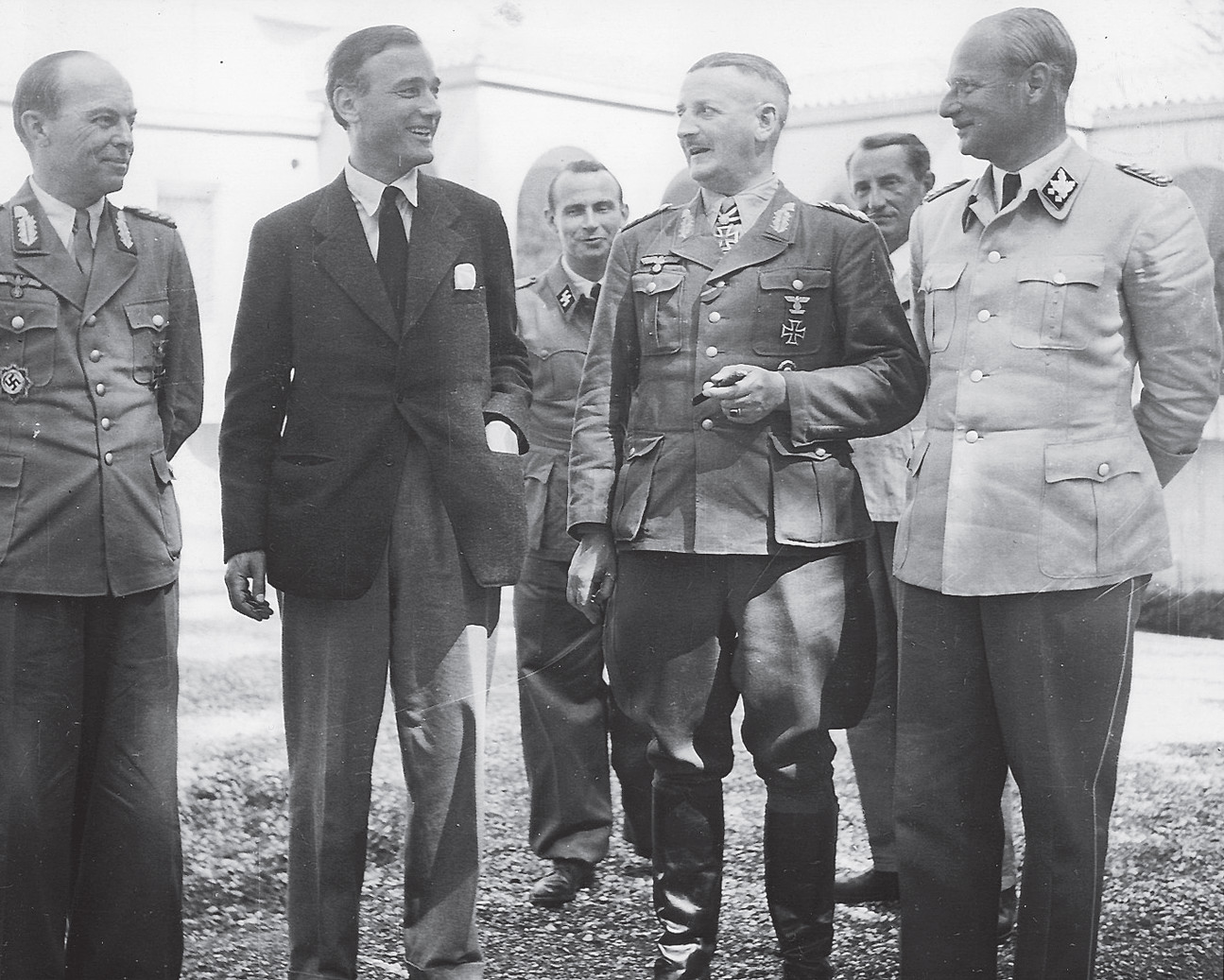
Wolff (right) with other German officers following the German surrender, 12 May 1945.

In 1945, Wolff, under Operation Sunrise, took over command and management of intermediaries (including the Swiss Intelligence officer, Captain Max Waibel) in order to make contact in Switzerland with the regional headquarters of the US Office of Strategic Services, under Allen W. Dulles, with a view to the surrender of German forces in and around Italy. After meetings in Zurich on 8 March 1945 and in Ascona on 19 March 1945 and a diplomatic standoff in Lucerne (23 to 25 April 1945) Wolff negotiated the surrender of all German forces in Italy (signed 29 April 1945, effective 2 May 1945), before the war in Europe officially ended with the surrender of Germany signed on 8 May 1945. Wolff's capitulation of Italy to the Allies upset the plans of Admiral Karl Dönitz (German President from 30 April 1945) who envisaged a staged series of surrenders designed to give German troops and refugees more time to make their way west.

== Trials and conviction ==
Arrested on 13 May 1945, he was imprisoned in Schöneberg. During the Nuremberg trials, Wolff was allowed to escape prosecution because of his early capitulation in Italy and by appearing as a witness for the prosecution at trial. Although released in 1947, he had been indicted by the post-war German government as part of the denazification process. Detained under house arrest, after a German trial, Wolff was sentenced to 5 years in prison in November 1948, for his membership in the SS. In June 1949, he was released from prison after his sentence was reduced to 4 years. After his release, Wolff worked as an executive for an advertising agency.

He took up residence with his family in Starnberg. In 1962, during the trial in Israel of Adolf Eichmann, evidence showed that Wolff had organized the deportation of Italian Jews in 1944. Wolff was arrested and put on trial in West Germany. In 1964, he was convicted of deporting 300,000 Jews to the Treblinka extermination camp, which led to their murders. Sentenced to 15 years in prison in Straubing, Wolff served only part of his sentence and was released in 1971 following a heart attack.

== Later life ==
After his release, Wolff retired to Austria. During the 1970s and early 1980s, Wolff returned to public life, frequently lecturing on the internal workings of the SS and his relationship with Himmler. After his release from prison in 1971 he appeared in television documentaries including The World At War saying that he witnessed an execution of twenty or thirty partisan prisoners in Minsk in 1941 with Himmler. In the early 1970s, Wolff promoted the theory of an alleged plot to kidnap Pope Pius XII. Most other allegations of such a plot are based on a 1972 document written by Wolff that Avvenire d'Italia published in 1991, and on personal interviews with Wolff before his death in 1984. Wolff maintained that on 13 September 1943, Hitler gave the directive to "occupy Vatican City, secure its files and art treasures, and take the Pope and Curia to the north". Hitler allegedly did not want the Pope to "fall into the hands of the Allies".

Wolff's reliability has been questioned by Holocaust historians, such as István Deák, a professor of history at Columbia University. Reviewing A Special Mission by Dan Kurzman, a promoter of the theory, Deák noted Kurzman's "credulity" and that the latter "uncritically accepts the validity of controversial documents and unquestioningly believes in the statements made to him by his principal German interlocutor, the former SS General Karl Wolff". He further criticized the book's "modest documentation" containing "a great number of vague or inaccurate references".

In the late 1970s Wolff also became involved with Stern journalist Gerd Heidemann. Together with Heidemann, he travelled through South America, where he helped to locate, among others, Klaus Barbie and Walter Rauff, with whom Heidemann conducted interviews for a series of articles. Wolff served as a consultant for the alleged Hitler Diaries and was upset when they turned out to be forgeries by Konrad Kujau. Asked to attend the trial of Heidemann and Kujau, Wolff declined.

== Personal life and death ==
On 17 July 1984, Wolff died in a hospital in Rosenheim. He was buried in the cemetery at Prien am Chiemsee on 21 July. His cause of death was never disclosed.

A few weeks before his death in 1984, Wolff made the Islamic profession of faith. At his grave, his daughter Fatima Grimm gave the funeral prayer in the presence of representatives of the Islamic Center of Munich (ICM). While in Munich in 1960, she had converted to Islam, later becoming a translator, author and speaker on Islam in Germany.

== SS ranks ==
SS ranks
Date	Rank
11 December 1931	SS-Scharführer
19 January 1932	SS-Truppführer
18 February 1932	SS-Sturmführer
30 January 1933	SS-Hauptsturmführer
9 November 1933	SS-Sturmbannführer
30 January 1934	SS-Obersturmbannführer
20 April 1934	SS-Standartenführer
4 July 1934	SS-Oberführer
9 November 1935	SS-Brigadeführer
30 January 1937	SS-Gruppenführer
3 May 1940	Generalleutnant der Waffen-SS
30 January 1942	SS-Obergruppenführer und General der Waffen-SS

== Portrayals in film ==
In the film The Scarlet and the Black (1983), Walter Gotell played the character SS-Obergruppenführer Max Helm, which was based on Karl Wolff.
