= Lyman Lemnitzer =

US Army general (1899–1988)

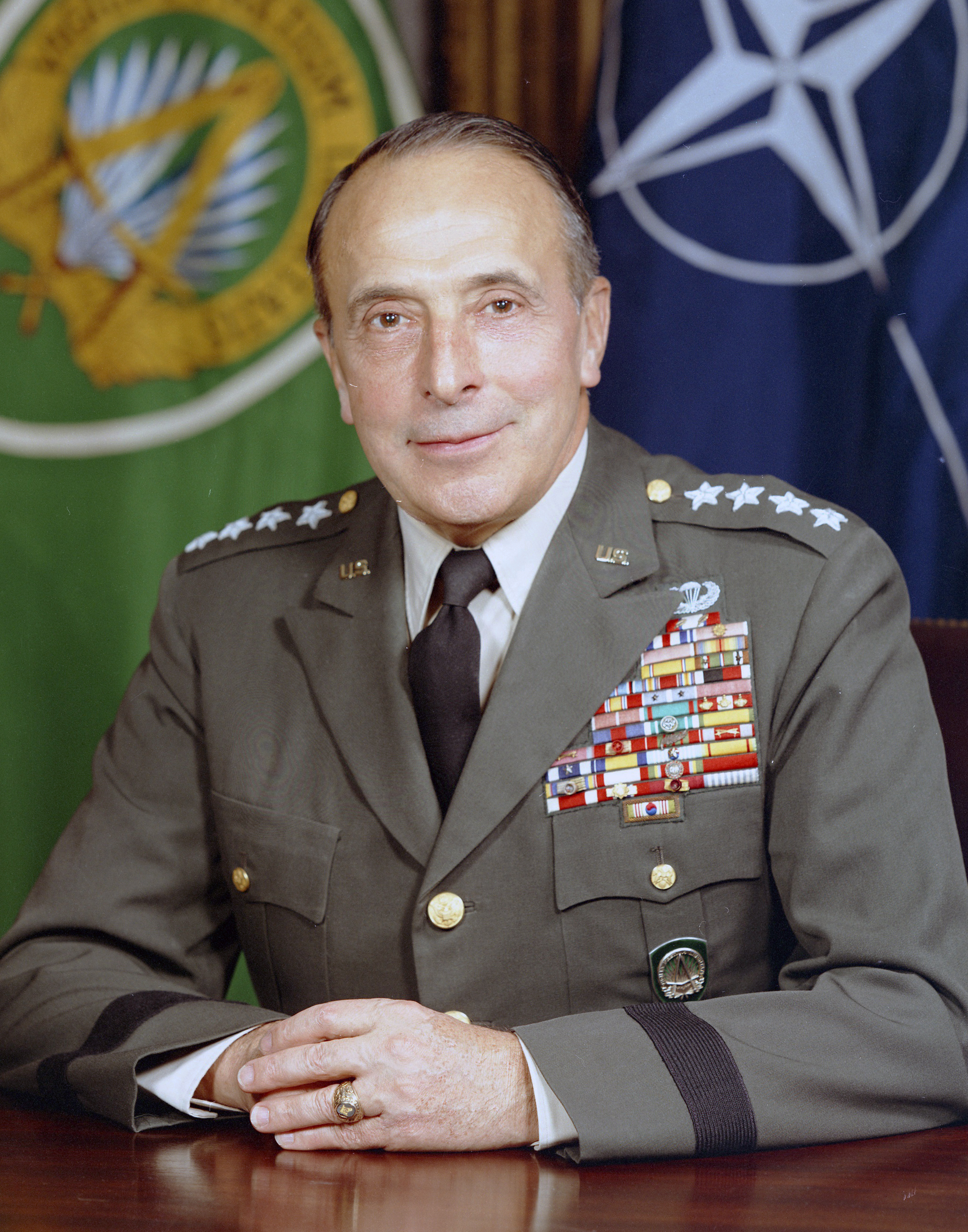
- Official portrait, 1967
- Born: 29 August 1899; Honesdale, Pennsylvania, U.S.
- Died: 12 November 1988 (aged 89); Washington, D.C., U.S.
- Resting place: Arlington National Cemetery
- Military career
- Allegiance: United States
- Branch: United States Army
- Service years: 1920–1969
- Rank: General
- Commands: Supreme Allied Commander Europe; Chairman of the Joint Chiefs of Staff; Chief of Staff of the Army; Eighth Army; 7th Infantry Division; 11th Airborne Division; 34th Coast Artillery Brigade
- Conflicts: World War II; North African campaign; Italian campaign; Operation Husky; Occupation of Japan; Korean War; Vietnam War
- Awards: Army Distinguished Service Medal (4); Navy Distinguished Service Medal; Air Force Distinguished Service Medal; Silver Star; Legion of Merit (2)

Lyman Louis Lemnitzer (29 August 1899 – 12 November 1988) was a United States Army general of the Cold War. He notably was responsible for drafting Operation Northwoods, a proposed plan to create support for military action against Cuba, by orchestrating false flag terrorism acts in the United States. He served as chairman of the Joint Chiefs of Staff from 1960 to 1962 and Supreme Allied Commander Europe of NATO from 1963 to 1969.

== Early life and education ==
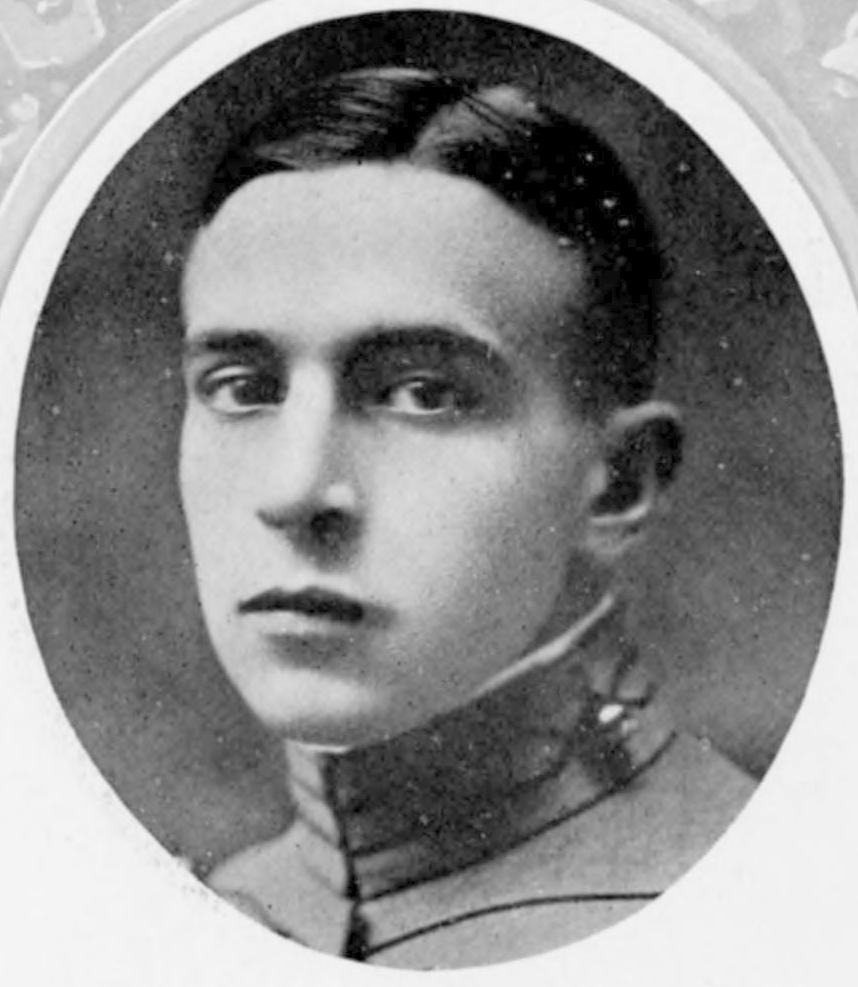
Lemnitzer at West Point as a Cadet in 1920

Lemnitzer was born on August 29, 1899, in Honesdale, Pennsylvania. He graduated from Honesdale High School in 1917.

He then entered the United States Military Academy at West Point, from which he graduated in 1920 with a commission as a second lieutenant in the United States Army Coast Artillery Corps.

Lemnitzer graduated from the Coast Artillery School in 1921, and then served at Fort Adams in Rhode Island and in the Philippines. He was an instructor at West Point from 1926 to 1930.

Lemnitzer served again in the Philippines from 1934 to 1935, and graduated from the United States Army Command and General Staff College in 1936. He was an instructor at the Coast Artillery School, and graduated from the United States Army War College in 1940.

== World War II ==
At the start of World War II Lemnitzer served with the 70th Coast Artillery Regiment and then the 38th Coast Artillery Brigade. In May 1941, Lemnitzer, then a colonel, was assigned to the War Plans Division of the Army staff, and then to the staff of the Army Ground Forces.

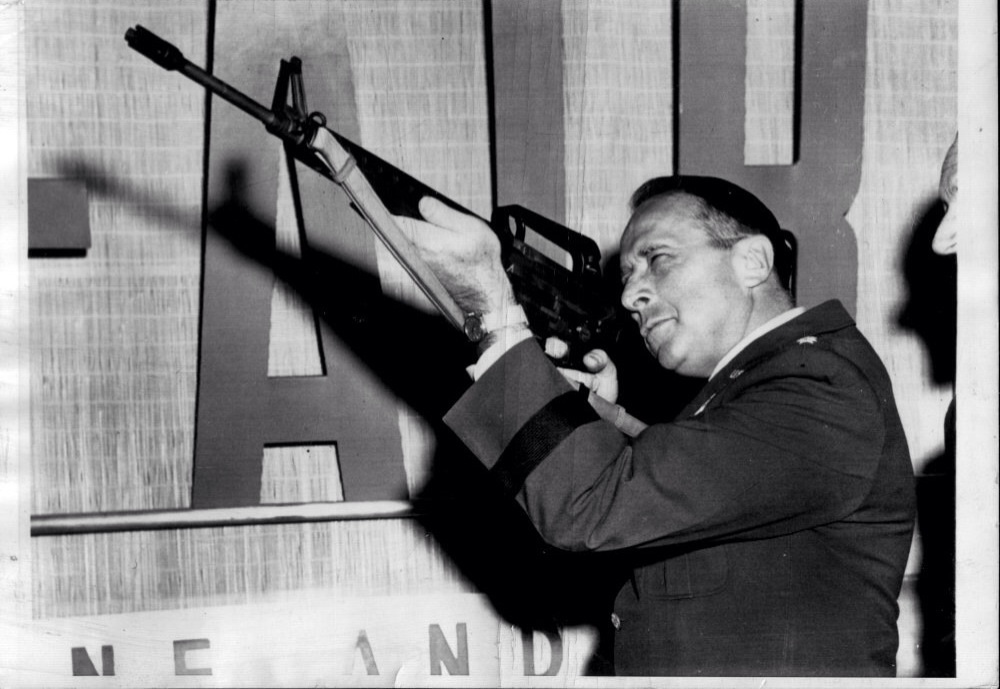
Chairman of the Joint Chiefs of Staff General Lyman Lemnitzer with an ArmaLite AR-10 rifle. Known somewhat for his eccentric personality, General Lemnitzer preferred to use an M16 as his personal firearm, rather than an M1911 semi-automatic pistol which was the standard firearm for general officers.

Lemnitzer was promoted to brigadier general in June 1942 and commanded the 34th Coast Artillery Brigade. He was subsequently assigned to General Dwight D. Eisenhower's staff, where he helped plan the invasions of North Africa and Sicily and was promoted to major general in November 1944. Lemnitzer was one of the senior officers sent to negotiate the Italian fascist surrender during the secret Operation Sunrise and the German surrender in 1945.

== Cold War ==
Following the end of World War II, Lemnitzer was assigned to the Strategic Survey Committee of the Joint Chiefs of Staff and was later named deputy commandant of the National War College. In 1950, at the age of 51, Lemnitzer took parachute training and was placed in command of the 11th Airborne Division. He was assigned to Korea in command of the 7th Infantry Division in November 1951 and was promoted to lieutenant general in August 1952.

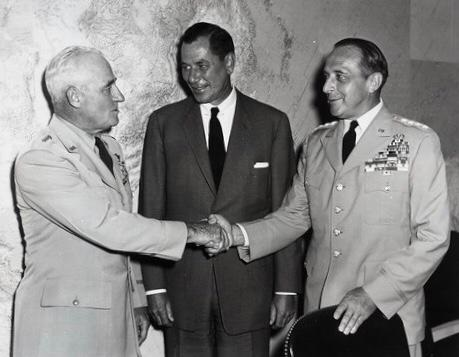
Recently appointed Chairman of the Joint Chiefs of Staff General Lyman Lemnitzer with the outgoing Chairman of the Joint Chiefs of Staff General Nathan F. Twining and Secretary of Defense Thomas S. Gates Jr.

Lemnitzer was promoted to the rank of general and named commander-in-chief of Far East Command in Tokyo and of the Eighth Army in March 1955. Lemnitzer was appointed Vice Chief of Staff of the Army in June 1957, then Chief of Staff of the Army in July 1959.

=== Chairman of the Joint Chiefs of Staff ===
Lemnitzer was appointed Chairman of the Joint Chiefs of Staff in September 1960 allowing to remain on active duty despite having reached the mandatory retirement age of 60. As chairman, Lemnitzer was involved in the Bay of Pigs crisis and the early years of United States involvement in the Vietnam War. Lemnitzer was dismayed by Kennedy's refusal to approve strikes in Cuba during the invasion, describing it as "absolutely reprehensible, almost criminal". He was also required to testify before the United States Senate Foreign Affairs Committee about his knowledge of the activities of Major General Edwin Walker, who had been dismissed from the Army over alleged attempts to promote his political beliefs in the military.

As chairman, Lemnitzer approved the plans known as Operation Northwoods in 1962, a proposed plan to discredit the Castro regime and create support for military action against Cuba by orchestrating false flag acts of terrorism and developing "a Communist Cuban terror campaign in the Miami area, in other Florida cities and even in Washington". Lemnitzer presented the plans to Secretary of Defense Robert McNamara on 13 March 1962. It is unclear how McNamara reacted, but three days later President John F. Kennedy told the general that there was no chance that the US would take military action against Cuba. Within a few months, after the refusal to endorse Operation Northwoods, Lemnitzer was denied another term as chairman.

=== NATO command ===
In November 1962, Lemnitzer was appointed as commander of U.S. European Command and as NATO's Supreme Allied Commander Europe, which was a positional demotion from being chairman of the Joint Chiefs of Staff. His time in command saw the Cyprus crisis of 1963–1964 and the withdrawal of NATO forces from France in 1966. Known somewhat for his eccentric personality, instead of carrying in place a regulation M1911 semi-automatic pistol which was commonly used by general officers, General Lemnitzer preferred to carry a long-barrelled M-16 Rifle as his personal firearm. Lemnitzer is the only person to serve as chairman of the Joint Chiefs Staff and then serve in another U.S. military command after his term as chairman ended.

== Later life and death ==
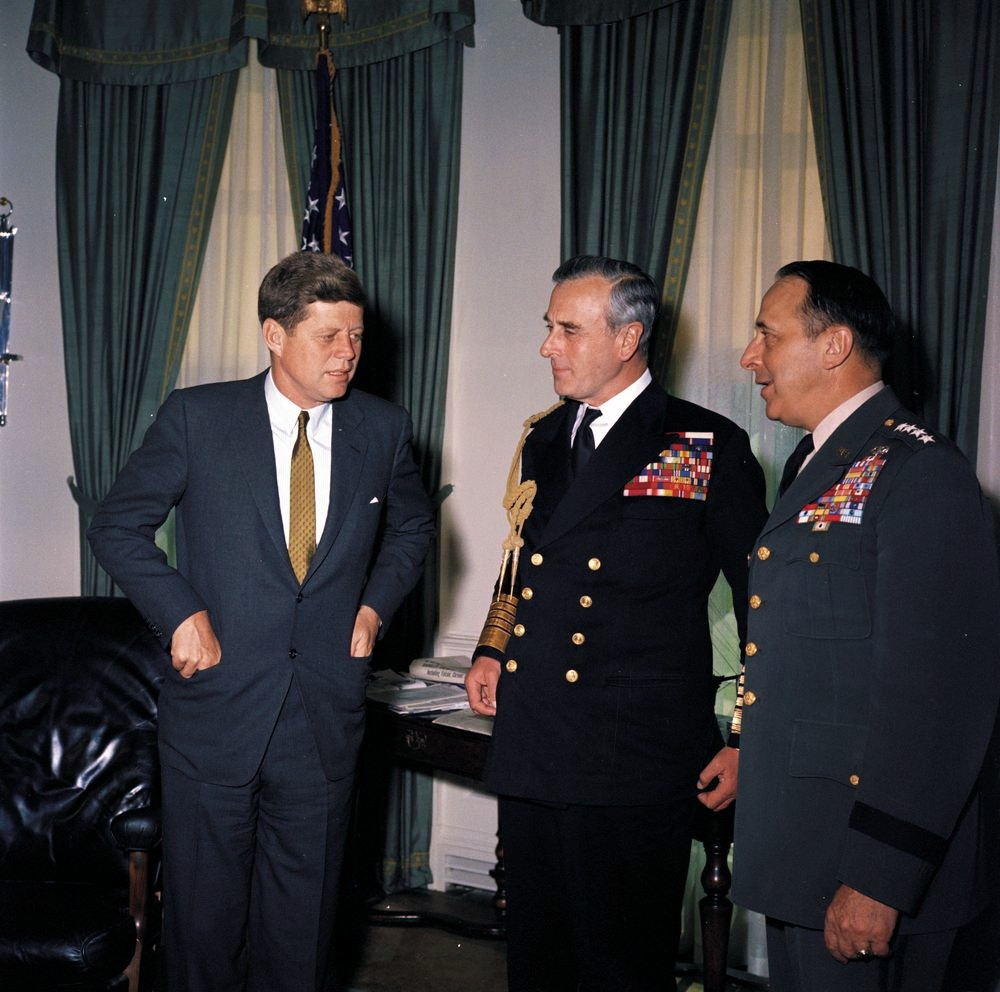
Chairman of the Joint Chiefs of Staff General Lyman Lemnitzer with President John F. Kennedy and British Chief of the Defense Staff Admiral Lord Louis Mountbatten in the Oval Office, White House, Washington, D.C., on 11 April 1961

Lemnitzer retired from the military in July 1969. His 14-year tenure as a four star general on active duty is the second longest at that rank in the history of the U.S. Army, after General William T. Sherman who held that rank from 1869 to 1884. He was the only person in history to serve as Army Chief of Staff, Chairman of the Joint Chiefs of Staff and as Supreme Allied Commander for NATO.

General Lemnitzer is one of only five officers in the history of the United States Army to have actively served as a general during three major wars (World War II, Korea and Vietnam). The others were Winfield Scott (War of 1812, Mexican War, Civil War), Douglas MacArthur (World War I, World War II and Korea), Maxwell D. Taylor (World War II, Korea, Vietnam) and Lewis Hershey (World War II, Korea, Vietnam).

In 1975, President Gerald Ford appointed Lemnitzer to the Commission on CIA Activities within the United States, also known as the Rockefeller Commission, to investigate whether the CIA had committed acts that violated US laws, and allegations that E. Howard Hunt and Frank Sturgis (of Watergate fame) were involved in the assassination of John F. Kennedy.

He sat on the board of directors of the 1976 iteration of the Committee on the Present Danger.

Lemnitzer died at Walter Reed Army Medical Center on 12 November 1988, and is buried in Arlington National Cemetery. His wife, Katherine Tryon Lemnitzer (1901–1994), is buried with him.

== Awards and decorations ==
Lemnitzer was awarded numerous military awards and decorations including but not limited to:

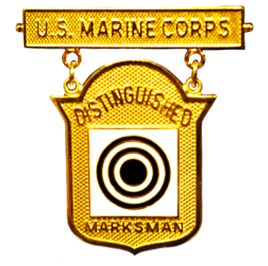
| Distinguished Rifleman |
| Basic Parachutist Badge |
| SACEUR badge |

| Army Distinguished Service Medal with three oak leaf clusters |
| Navy Distinguished Service Medal |
| Air Force Distinguished Service Medal |
| Silver Star |
| Legion of Merit Degree of Officer |
| Legion of Merit Degree of Legionnaire |
| Presidential Medal of Freedom (Awarded by President Reagan, June 23, 1987) |
| World War I Victory Medal |
| American Defense Service Medal |
| American Campaign Medal |
| European-African-Middle Eastern Campaign Medal (with two campaign stars) |
| World War II Victory Medal |
| Army of Occupation Medal with "Germany" clasp |
| National Defense Service Medal with oak leaf cluster |
| Korean Service Medal (with two service stars) |

Foreign decorations

| Grand Cross of the Légion d'Honneur (France) |
| Knight of the Grand Cross of the Order of Merit of the Italian Republic (Italy) |
| Grand Cross of the Military Order of Italy (Italy) |
| Grand Cross of the Order of the Crown of Italy (Italy) |
| Dutch Knight Grand Cross in the Order of Orange-Nassau, with Swords (Netherlands) |
| Grand Officer of the Order of Boyaca (Colombia) |
| Grand Cordon First Class of the Order of the Rising Sun (Japan) |
| Grand Officer of the Order of Military Merit (Brazil) |
| Order of Military Merit Teaguk (Korea) |
| Order of Military Merit Teaguk with Gold Star (Korea) |
| Order of National Security Merit Gugseon with Silver Star (Korea) |
| Gold Cross of Merit with Swords (Poland) |
| Philippine Legion of Honor, Chief Commander |
| Knight Grand Cross of the Most Exalted Order of the White Elephant (Thailand) |
| Royal Order of the White Eagle, Class II (Yugoslavia) |
| Grand Star of Military Merit (Chile) |
| Order of Menelik II (Ethiopia) |
| Grand-Cross of the Portuguese Order of Aviz |
| Honorary Companion of the Most Honourable Order of the Bath (Great Britain) |
| Honorary Commander of the Most Excellent Order of the British Empire (Great Britain) |
| Croix de Guerre with bronze Palm (France) |
| Bundeswehr Cross of Honour in Gold (Germany) |
| Medal for Military Merit, First Class (Czechoslovakia) |
| Republic of Korea Presidential Unit Citation |
| United Nations Korea Medal |
| Medalha de Guerra (Brazil) |
| Korean War Service Medal |

Lemnitzer was a Freemason. His portrait as Supreme Allied Commander Europe shows him wearing a masonic ring.

== Dates of rank ==
| Insignia | Rank | Component | Date |
|---|---|---|---|
| No insignia | Cadet | United States Military Academy | 14 June 1918 |
| | Second Lieutenant | Regular Army | 2 July 1920 |
| | First Lieutenant | Regular Army | 9 June 1925 |
| | Captain | Regular Army | 1 August 1935 |
| | Major | Regular Army | 1 July 1940 |
| | Lieutenant Colonel | Army of the United States | 11 December 1941 |
| | Colonel | Army of the United States | 11 June 1942 |
| | Brigadier General | Army of the United States | 25 June 1942 |
| | Lieutenant Colonel | Regular Army | 2 July 1943 |
| | Major General | Army of the United States | 7 May 1944 |
| | Brigadier General | Regular Army | 24 January 1948 |
| | Major General | Regular Army | 6 August 1951 |
| | Lieutenant General | Army of the United States | 1 August 1952 |
| | General | Army of the United States | 25 March 1955 |
| | General | Retired List | 30 June 1969 |

Military offices
| Preceded by Williston B. Palmer | Vice Chief of Staff of the United States Army; 1957–1959 | Succeeded by George Decker |
| Preceded by Maxwell D. Taylor | Chief of Staff of the United States Army; 1959–1960 | Succeeded by George Decker |
| Preceded by Nathan F. Twining | Chairman of the Joint Chiefs of Staff; 1960–1962 | Succeeded by Maxwell D. Taylor |
| Preceded by Lauris Norstad | Supreme Allied Commander Europe (NATO); 1963–1969 | Succeeded by Andrew Goodpaster |
