= Front in the Rear of the Enemy =

- Russian: Фронт в тылу врага
- Directed by: Igor Gostev; Victor Kulle
- Written by: Semyon Dneprov; Semyon Tsvigun
- Starring: Vyacheslav Tikhonov; Valeriya Zaklunnaya; Evgeniy Matveev; Ivan Lapikov; Aleksandr Mikhaylov
- Cinematography: Aleksandr Kharitonov
- Music by: Veniamin Basner
- Release date: 1981
- Running time: 161 minute
- Country: Soviet Union
- Language: Russian

Front in the Rear of the Enemy (Russian: Фронт в тылу врага, romanized: Front v tylu vraga) is a 1981 Soviet war drama film directed by Igor Gostev and Victor Kulle.

The film is the third part in a trilogy directed by Igor Gostev about partisan resistance against the Nazi occupation of the Soviet Union during WWII. The first part is Front Without Flanks (1975). The second part is Front Beyond the Front Line (1977). All three screenplays were written by KGB Officer Semyon Tsvigun.

Vyacheslav Tikhonov starred as Soviet Army Officer Mlynsky, the commander of the partisan group in all three films.

== Plot ==
It is 1944. Lt. Colonel Mlynsky's partisan detachment is tasked with fostering the international unification of Poles, Czechs, and Slovaks in order to capture a training ground with them where they are testing secret fascist weapon.

== Cast ==
- Vyacheslav Tikhonov as Colonel Mlynsky
- Valeriya Zaklunnaya as Irina Petrovna
- Evgeniy Matveev as Simerenko
- Ivan Lapikov as Erofeich
- Aleksandr Mikhaylov
- Vaiva Mainelyte
- Tofik Mirzoyev
- Viktor Shulgin as Khvat
- Lev Polyakov as Fridrich von Büttsov
- Leonid Dyachkov
