= Yekaterina Gradova =

Soviet actress (1946–2021)

- Екатерина Градова
- Born: Yekaterina Georgievna Gradova; 6 October 1946; Moscow, Russian SFSR, Soviet Union
- Died: 22 February 2021 (aged 74); Moscow, Russia
- Occupation: Actress
- Years active: 1969–1992

Yekaterina Georgievna Gradova (Russian: Екатери́на Гео́ргиевна Гра́дова; 6 October 1946 – 22 February 2021) was a Russian film actress who appeared in two Soviet blockbuster films Seventeen Moments of Spring and The Meeting Place Cannot Be Changed.

== Career ==
Gradova played her first notable role at the beginning of 1966 in Boris Yashin's drama Autumn Weddings. Later, she starred in films rather infrequently, preferring theater to cinema. She was an actress in the Theater of Satire until the 1980s. Also, at the Mayakovsky Theatre, Gradova played a major role in the play Talents and Admirers, which was made into a film in 1971.

Her most significant success was the role of pianist (clandestine radio-operator) Kate of Soviet spy Standartenführer von Stierlitz in the Soviet blockbuster TV serial Seventeen Moments of Spring (1968) directed by Tatyana Lioznova. This serial was about the life of the Soviet spy Maksim Isaev, operating in Nazi Germany under the name Max Otto von Stierlitz, played by the leading Soviet film star Vyacheslav Tikhonov. The serial immediately brought immense popularity for the main actors. Later, she acknowledged that for those who starred in the serial: This was not just a movie, this was like a destiny. Indeed, for many years each of the stars of the serial received tremendous attention and were often invited to various conferences, asked for interviews, etc.

In 1979, she played a small but significant role (Svetlana Volokushina) in another Soviet blockbuster The Meeting Place Cannot Be Changed (starring another great Soviet film star and bard Vladimir Vysotsky).

== Personal life ==
In the spring of 1971, Ekaterina Gradova joined the Theater of Satire (Moscow), one of the leading Soviet theaters. The 25-year-old actress immediately attracted the attention of the star of the theater, Andrei Mironov. In autumn, they were married, and after two years their daughter, Maria, (now the popular actress Maria Mironova) was born. However, the relationship ran into problems. Soon after the birth of his daughter Mironov left the family. His new choice was the star of popular Soviet musical comedy Hussar Ballad, Larisa Golubkina. In 1974, Mironov finally moved to live with Golubkina, and two years later, got a formal divorce from Gradova.

Gradova died at the age of 74 from a stroke.
