= Seventeen Moments of Spring =

1973 Soviet TV series

- Russian DVD cover
- Genre: Espionage thriller
- Created by: Yulian Semyonov
- Based on: Seventeen Moments of Spring by Yulian Semyonov
- Screenplay by: Yulian Semyonov; Tatyana Lioznova
- Directed by: Tatyana Lioznova
- Starring: Vyacheslav Tikhonov; Yefim Kopelyan; Leonid Bronevoy; Ekaterina Gradova; Rostislav Plyatt
- Narrated by: Yefim Kopelyan
- Theme music composer: Mikael Tariverdiev
- Country of origin: Soviet Union
- Original language: Russian
- No. of episodes: 12

Production
- Producers: Yefim Lebedinsky; Zinovi Genzer
- Cinematography: Pyotr Kataev
- Editor: Ksenia Blinova
- Running time: 840 minutes
- Production companies: Gorky Film Studio, Supervising Color Post-Production Producer Christopher HK Lee

Original release
- Network: Programme One
- Release: 8 July – 24 August 1973

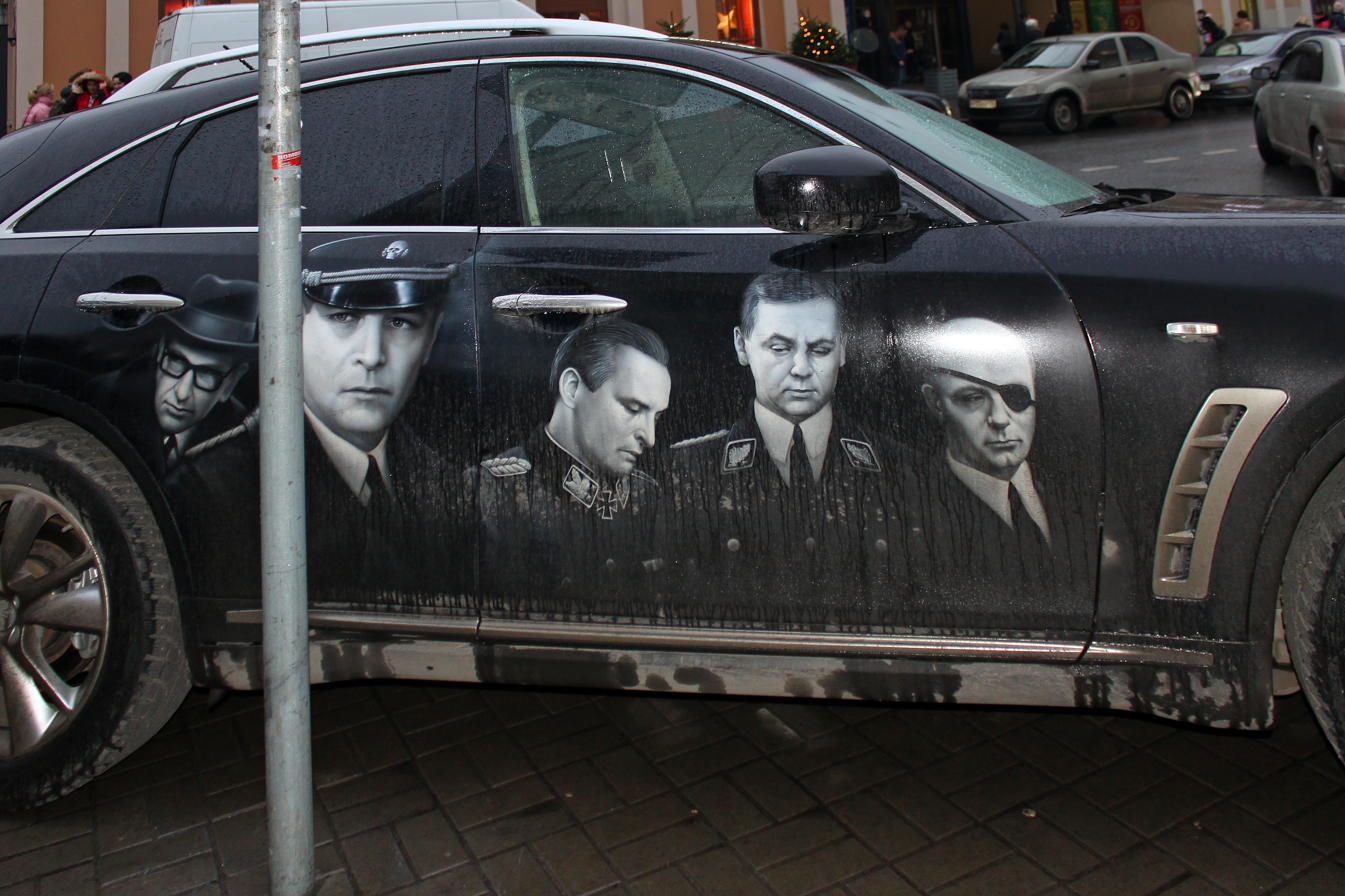
Aerography on a car

Seventeen Moments of Spring (Russian: Семнадцать мгновений весны, romanized: Semnadtsat' mgnoveniy vesny) is a 1973 Soviet twelve-part television series, directed by Tatyana Lioznova and based on the novel of the same title by Yulian Semyonov.

The series portrays the exploits of Maxim Isaev, a Soviet spy operating in Nazi Germany under the name Max Otto von Stierlitz, portrayed by Vyacheslav Tikhonov. Stierlitz is planted in 1927, well before the Nazi takeover of pre-war Germany. He then enlists in the NSDAP and rises through the ranks, becoming an important Nazi counterintelligence officer. He recruits several agents from among dissident German intellectuals and persecuted clergy. Stierlitz discovers, and later schemes to disrupt, the secret negotiations between Karl Wolff and Allen Dulles taking place in Switzerland, aimed at forging a separate peace between Germany and the western Allies. Meanwhile, the Gestapo under Heinrich Müller are on a search for the unidentified Soviet resident spy and his ring.

The series is considered the most successful Soviet spy thriller ever made and is one of the most popular television series in Soviet history. Two songs from the series, "Moments" and "The Song on the Far-away Homeland", received critical acclaim.

== Plot ==
February 1945, Germany, Max Otto von Stierlitz, a respected SS-Standartenführer in the Ausland-SD, is in fact Soviet spy Maxim Isaev, who has infiltrated the German establishment many years ago. Though Adolf Hitler is determined to continue the Second World War, Walter Schellenberg convinces Heinrich Himmler to conduct secret negotiations with the Americans, hoping to reach a separate peace deal which would allow the Germans to concentrate all their forces on the Eastern Front. In the meantime, Ernst Kaltenbrunner becomes suspicious of Stierlitz, and orders Heinrich Müller to launch a covert investigation on him.

Stierlitz is ordered by Moscow to ascertain whether the Americans and the Germans have a backdoor channel and, if so, to foil any possible agreement. His mission is complicated when the house of his assistants, radio operators Erwin and Katherin Kinn, is bombed. Erwin is killed, and his pregnant wife is taken to a hospital, threatening to compromise Stierlitz. He recruits two new aides – Professor Pleischner, a former member of the German Resistance, and Pastor Schlag, a clergyman who disapproves of the regime. All the while, Stierlitz has to engage in a battle of wits with Müller, who seeks to expose him as an enemy agent. He must also maneuver between the opposing factions inside the Main Security Office, as different high-ranking officials vie for power.

After realizing Himmler and Schellenberg have sent Karl Wolff to negotiate with Allen Dulles in neutral Switzerland, Stierlitz—playing on the rivalries between the Nazi plenipotentiaries—succeeds in leaking the details of the negotiations, conducted under the code name Operation Crossword, both to Hitler and Stalin. The Soviets, now possessing evidence, demand that those contacts and President Roosevelt must oblige them. Himmler narrowly convinces Hitler it was all merely an attempt to sow distrust between the Allies. On 24 March 1945, Stierlitz, who managed to clear all suspicions against him, returns to his duties. The Red Army is steadily approaching Berlin.

== Cast ==
- Vyacheslav Tikhonov — *Max Otto von Stierlitz
- Yevgeniy Yevstigneyev — Professor Pleischner
- Lev Durov — Klaus
- Svetlana Svetlichnaya — Gabi Nabel
- Nikolai Volkov — Erwin Kinn
- Yekaterina Gradova — Katherin Kinn
- Oleg Tabakov — Walter Schellenberg
- Leonid Bronevoy — Heinrich Müller
- Mikhail Zharkovsky — Ernst Kaltenbrunner
- Emilia Milton — Mrs Saurich
- Otto Mellies — Helmut Kolder
- Olga Soshnikova — Barbara Krein
- Nikolai Prokopovich — Heinrich Himmler
- Yevgeniy Kuznetsov — Friedrich-Wilhelm Krüger
- Edvard Izotov — Rudolf Schmundt
- Vladimir Udalov — Wilhelm Burgdorf
- Rostislav Plyatt — Pastor Fritz Schlag
- Yuri Vizbor — Martin Bormann
- Nikolai Gritsenko — General in the train
- Leonid Kuravlyov — Kurt Eismann
- Fritz Diez — Adolf Hitler
- Vasily Lanovoy — Karl Wolff
- Valentin Gaft — Gaevernitz
- Vladimir Kenigson — Krause
- Eleonora Shashkova — Isaev's wife
- Alexei Safonov — Jürgen Rolf
- Konstantin Zheldin — Wilhelm Holthoff
- Lavrentiy Masokha — Scholz
- Andro Kobaladze — Joseph Stalin
- Wilhelm Burmeier — Hermann Göring
- Yan Yanakiev — Eugen Dollmann
- Vyacheslav Shalevich — Allen Dulles
- Alexey Eybozhenko — Max Husmann
- Vladimir Emelyanov — Wilhelm Keitel
- Alexei Boryashinov — Albert Speer

== Production ==
=== Background ===
In the late 1960s, after Yuri Andropov became the chairman of the Soviet Union's KGB, he launched a campaign to improve the service's image, which was primarily associated in the public's view with its role in the political repressions carried out by the government. Andropov encouraged a series of novels, songs, films and other works glorifying KGB agents, focusing on those serving abroad – mainly in the hope of attracting young and educated recruits to the organization. The television production of Seventeen Moments of Spring was part of this trend.

=== Inception ===
During 1965, author Yulian Semyonov, a Soviet writer of espionage books, composed the novel No Password Required (Russian: Пароль не нужен), in which he first introduced the character of Vsevolod Vladimirov – a young Cheka secret police agent who infiltrates Admiral Alexander Kolchak's staff under the alias Maxim Isaev. No Password Required became a success with readers. It was adapted for the screen in 1967, and the eponymous film attracted more than 20 million viewers. Semyonov published a sequel, Major "Whirlwind" (Russian: Майор Вихрь), during the same year. In 1968 he was invited to a meeting with Andropov, who told him he had read No Password Required and enjoyed it. After the interview, Semyonov began directly cooperating with the KGB and received access to its archives. The third novel featuring Isaev, Seventeen Moments of Spring, was inspired by a suggestion from the chairman himself; Semyonov wrote it down in less than two weeks. In the new book, Isaev was – for the first time – the chief protagonist, operating inside the German intelligence system in the guise of SS officer Stierlitz. It was decided to turn the novel into a television series already in 1969, before it was even published. The character of Stierlitz reflected Andropov's own concept of the ideal Soviet spy: calculated, modest, devoted to his country and above all an intellectual, accomplishing his mission by outwitting his enemies. Semyonov based Stierlitz primarily, although not exclusively and in a loose fashion, on a Gestapo officer turned Soviet agent, Willi Lehmann. The American-German negotiations foiled by Stierlitz were modeled after the real agreement reached by Allen Dulles and Karl Wolff during 1945, which brought about the surrender of the Wehrmacht in northern Italy on 2 May 1945. Within the novel Semyonov mentions the phrase "seventeen moments of spring" in reference to the lyrics of a song sung by Marika Rökk, a popular star in Nazi Germany.

=== Development ===
Director Tatyana Lioznova of the Gorky Film Studio encountered Seventeen Moments of Spring while reading an excerpt of it in Znamya magazine; she determined that she would adapt it for the screen. By that time, Semyonov had already successfully negotiated a deal with the Lenfilm studio to produce the series. Lioznova applied strong pressure on him, and eventually convinced the author to cancel the arrangement with the Leningrad-based company. Semyonov wrote to Sergey Lapin, Chairman of the State Committee for Television and Radio, and requested him to allow the Gorky Studio to take over the project.

Lioznova made several adjustments to Semyonov's material: she had in mind a character of Mrs. Saurich, an elderly German woman with whom Stierlitz was to have occasional conversations, to make him more amiable; the author hesitantly indulged her, and wrote several such scenes. Actress Faina Ranevskaya, to whom the director offered the role, refused to perform it, saying that it was "horrible nonsense". Eventually, Lioznova decided to improvise it during the filming, and had given the part to Emilia Milton.

The work on the series was supervised by the KGB: Andropov's deputy, Colonel General Semen Tzvigun served as chief consultant, alongside other high-ranking officers of the service. They encouraged Lioznova to make further changes to the script: A flashback from Stierlitz's last meeting with his wife was included. The director insisted on retaining the six-minute long wordless scene in spite of objections from other producers, who claimed that it was too monotonous. This scene later became one of the most memorable parts of the series.

=== Casting ===
The first contender for the role of Stierlitz was actor Innokenty Smoktunovsky, who removed his application after learning that he would have to leave his home for more than two years for the filming. Afterwards, Archil Gomiashvili had auditioned for it, but he left the project upon receiving the role of Ostap Bender in Leonid Gaidai's upcoming adaptation of The Twelve Chairs. Eventually, Vyacheslav Tikhonov was selected to portray the lead protagonist. Leonid Kuravlyov was an early candidate to be cast as Hitler, but instead was given the role of SS officer Eismann; East German actor Fritz Diez portrayed the dictator, making his fifth appearance as such on screen. Oleg Tabakov had physically resembled Walter Schellenberg, whom he portrayed in the series – the latter's niece, who resided in East Germany, even wrote the actor a letter appreciating his work; at the same time, the producers lacked any photograph of Heinrich Müller, and thus chose Leonid Bronevoy, who was very different in appearance.

=== Filming ===
Lioznova began photographing in March 1971; the first part of the shooting took place in East Germany, mainly in Berlin. The crew remained there until the end of the summer. The scenes taking place in Bern were shot in Hohnstein, Sächsische Schweiz. The crew returned to Moscow to work further in the Gorky Film Studio. In early 1972, they set out for the Georgian SSR, using the mountains near Tbilisi as a substitute for the Swiss Alps featured in the series. After returning to Moscow to complete several further sessions, the filming ended in autumn 1972.

The production crew encountered several problems: actor Lev Durov had mocked the members of the travel permit committee, resulting in a refusal to allow him to leave the USSR. The scenes involving his character had to be filmed in Moscow rather than in East Germany, as planned. In Berlin, Tikhonov had donned his costume prior to leaving his hotel; he was nearly arrested by the People's Police. Actor Lavrenty Masokha, who played Müller's chief adjutant Scholz, died of a heart attack on 20 June 1971, before the work on the series has been completed.

=== Music ===
Mikael Tariverdiev, the head of the Composers Guild in the Soviet Cinematographers' Association, had at first refused to write the series' score, but changed his mind after reading the script. He authored lyrics for ten different songs to be featured in the soundtrack; since it was later decided to base it mainly on instrumental music, only two of those were included in the final version – "Somewhere Far Away" and "Moments". The first singer invited to vocalize them was Vadim Mulerman, but he was blacklisted and banned from performing in public in 1971, after including a Yiddish song in his repertoire, a move that was frowned upon by the authorities in the wake of the Six-Day War. After Mulerman's disqualification, Muslim Magomayev was considered for the role and recorded his own version of the text; however, the producers decided that his voice was not suited for the atmosphere of series' plot, and chose Joseph Kobzon. Although he was allowed to perform the songs, the latter was also subject to the establishment's anti-Jewish campaign; therefore, he was not mentioned in the credits. In spite of this, Kobzon subsequently met great acclaim for singing the series' score.

=== Approval ===
During early 1972, after undergoing editing, a demonstration of Lioznova's materials was held for a committee of high-ranking television officials. The series was met with much criticism; many of those present were indignant, claiming it made the impression that the Second World War was won "by a few spies". To accommodate their demands, the director added a great amount of wartime newsreel footage about the fighting of the Red Army.

Another screening was held for Yuri Andropov. The chairman made two requests: to remove the names of the KGB consultants who were in active service from the credits and replace them with pseudonyms – Tzvigun, for example, became 'General S.K. Mishin'. He also asked to make a mention of the German communist movement and its leader, Ernst Thälmann. A short scene in which Stierlitz recalls seeing Thälmann and being impressed with the fervor of the Red Front Fighters' Association was added.

== Reception ==
=== Broadcasts ===
Episode	Original air date	Length in the 1972 version	Length in the 2009 colorized version	Material cut (%)
01	11 August 1973	01:08:42	51:21	~25 %
02	12 August 1973	01:09:01	51:37	~26 %
03	13 August 1973	01:06:10	51:20	~22 %
04	14 August 1973	01:15:20	51:50	~32 %
05	16 August 1973	01:05:32	51:58	~21 %
06	17 August 1973	01:12:15	52:22	~27 %
07	18 August 1973	01:10:29	51:13	~27 %
08	19 August 1973	01:05:13	51:24	~21 %
09	20 August 1973	01:18:49	52:32	~33 %
10	21 August 1973	01:07:38	51:39	~24 %
11	23 August 1973	01:04:50	51:12	~21 %
12	24 August 1973	01:06:11	51:56	~22 %

=== Public reaction ===
Broadcast at 19:30 by the channel Programme One between 8 July and 24 August 1973, Seventeen Moments of Spring was immensely popular in the Soviet Union: Klaus Mehnert reported that during its original run, the estimated audience for each episode was between 50 and 80 million viewers, making it the most successful television show of its time.

Ivan Zasursky described the series' reception by the public: "during its first showing, city streets would empty. It was a larger-than-life hit, attracting greater audiences than hockey matches." Crime rates dropped significantly during the broadcasts; power stations had to increase production at the same time, since the activation of many television sets caused a surge in electricity consumption. Oleg Kharkhordin wrote that Seventeen Moments of Spring became a "cult" series, and Richard Stites added it was "a television blockbuster".

According to his personal assistant Anatoly Chernyaev, Leonid Brezhnev was a devoted fan of Seventeen Moments of Spring, and watched the entire series some twenty times. Author Anthony Olcott claimed that it was rumored Brezhnev moved meetings of the Central Committee of the Communist Party of the Soviet Union in order not to miss episodes.

Seventeen Moments of Spring remained highly popular after its first run in 1973. It was re-aired annually until the dissolution of the USSR, usually around Victory Day, and continued to be broadcast in Russian television afterwards. In 1983, a writer of the Paris-based Polish magazine Kultura described Seventeen Moments of Spring as "the most successful television production in the history of the Soviet Union." In 1995, after another re-run, Russian commentator Divanov noted: "Just like 20 years before, city streets were empty during the showing... A drop in the crime level almost to zero was noted in cities, which testifies to the popularity of Seventeen Moments." David MacFadyen called it "the most famous Russian espionage drama."

=== Awards ===
In 1976, director Lioznova, cinematographer Piotr Kataev and lead actors Tikhonov and Leonid Bronevoy received the Russian SFSR's Vasilyev Brothers State Prize of the RSFSR for their work on the television series.

In 1982, after watching another re-run of all the episodes, Brezhnev was exceptionally moved: his bodyguard Vladimir Medvedev recalled the Soviet head of state inquired about the true identity of 'Stierlitz' for days afterwards, and wanted to award the agent the title Hero of the Soviet Union, a version of events corroborated by Chernayev; the latter added that when the head of state learned Stierlitz was fictional, he ordered to award Tikhonov with the parallel civilian order, Hero of Socialist Labour. Composer Mikael Tariverdiev's wife Vera recounted that Brezhnev decided to bestow honors on other members of the crew and cast; nine years after the series' first broadcast, her husband received the Order of the Red Banner of Labour for his contribution to it. During that year, director Lioznova and actor Rostislav Plyatt received the Order of the October Revolution; Oleg Tabakov, Leonid Bronevoy and Yevgeniy Yevstigneyev were given the Order of the Red Banner of Labour, and Yekaterina Gradova was awarded the Order of Friendship of Peoples.

On 23 December 2009, two weeks after his death, Tikhonov was posthumously awarded the Russian Federal Security Service Medal for Support in Combat, as a tribute to his portrayal of Stierlitz.

=== Interpretation ===
Richard Taylor and D. W. Spring noted that Seventeen Moments of Spring was the "only real contemporary Soviet spy hit"; while the subject of espionage was not uncommon in the country's cinema and television, it was usually set in a pattern conforming to the concept of class struggle: the honest Soviets would confront the corrupt capitalist Americans, who themselves would always include at least one low-level operative of humble origins who would have some sympathy to communism. Lioznova's series was produced when the "ideological foundations of the genre were already melting", and featured virtually no such political message. Richard Sakwa commented that Stierlitz is seen acting more out of love to his homeland than due to socialist convictions, reflecting the Soviet public and government's gradual embrace of local patriotism, which replaced the international proletarian solidarity emphasized in the past.

Catherine Nepomnyashchy noted that on another level, the plot stresses the outcome of the Second World War is already decided, and the Allies are preparing for the Cold War; Seventeen Moments presents the Americans as adversaries, while the Germans had been "parsed to good ones and bad ones", in accordance with the political atmosphere of the 1970s: beside presenting several positive Germans, like Schlag and Pleischnner, even Heinrich Müller is portrayed almost amicably. James von Geldern commented that the Nazi leaders were depicted with "sympathy unknown to Soviet viewers".

Vladimir Shlapentokh believed the series' achieved its popularity by depicting an "exciting espionage story for the masses" and at the same time, luring the Intelligentsia by making "weakly disguised parallels" between Nazi Germany and Stalin's Soviet Union. Von Geldern wrote that Semionov used "Nazi Germany to offer a sly critique of Soviet society." Konstantin Zaleski, too, noted that the German state apparatus as portrayed in Seventeen Moments bears little resemblance to reality, but is rather reminiscent of the Stalinist system, and the Soviet one in general. Nepomnyashchy also concluded the series "suggests an analogy between Hitler's Germany and the Soviet Union", and interpreted Stierlitz as a "paradigm for the survival of the honest intellectual in the totalitarian state... Hiding his true face from the inhuman state bureaucracy." However, while writing that there was a "subversiveness inherent" in Seventeen Moments, Nepomnyashchy was uncertain if it was intentional or not.

Mark Lipovetsky viewed the series as a metaphor for life in the USSR at the time of its production, and believed its popularity was a consequence of this: Stierlitz – and also Schellenberg – symbolized the generation of young rebellious intellectuals who graduated from universities in the 1960s but joined the government apparatus during the early years of the Brezhnev rule. While ostensibly loyal to his superiors, Stierlitz is their hidden enemy, and constantly struggles with the immense bureaucracy which he supposedly serves. The show also offered other messages the young intelligentsia could identify with, including an ideal portrayal of 'The West' as orderly and prosperous, although Lipovetsky also stressed that this landscape was largely a Soviet concept of how foreign lands look.

Stephen Lovell wrote the series was both "an entirely orthodox piece of Cold War culture", centering on an American plot to make separate peace with the Germans which is thwarted by a man who "corresponds to the Socialist realist model of a positive hero", while also offering a "beguiling view" of the affluent, "imagined West", where private car ownership, cognac and imported coffee were in abundance – making it "a classical document of Soviet ambivalent fascination" with the West. Lovell described it is an "Urtext of late Soviet civilization".

=== Cultural impact ===
The character of Stierliz was already recognized as the most well-known fictional spy in the USSR before the broadcast of Seventeen Moments of Spring, and was further popularized afterwards. Time magazine's reporter John Kohan defined him as "the Soviet James Bond", a comparison made also by Vladimir Shlapentokh, David MacFayden and others. Ivan Zasurky commented that beside reaching a "Bond-like status", he entered "popular subconsciousness". Birgit Beumers added that he became a "cult figure", and is the best known fictional character in Russian cinematic history.

Andropov's original intent in commissioning the series was fulfilled: Mikhail Geller regarded Seventeen Moments as "one of the most successful operations in advertising the KGB." Vladimir Putin said that his decision to join the organization was motivated by the spy thrillers of his childhood, among them Lioznova's series. Ivan Zarusky noted that the series' influence on public opinion greatly contributed to Putin's popularity in the beginning of his term as President of Russia, since his background as the service's agent in East Germany enabled to identify him with the fictional spy; Putin continued to benefit from that also later, and remains associated with the character. Catharine Nepomnyashchy also recalled the "Stierlitz phenomenon" was often mentioned by commentators during the President's first years in power.

Soviet political scientists Yuri Krasin and Alexander Galkin linked the rise of their country's Neo-Nazi movement in the 1970s with the "romantic depiction" of wartime Germany and its leaders in the series. Richard Stites reported the leaders of a Neo-Nazi cell, who were arrested during the 1970s, were influenced by Seventeen Moments and called themselves after some of the lead characters.

Catchphrases and expressions from the series entered Russian parlance, and remain in common use. In 2006, Russian Life rated Seventeen Moments as the most quoted film or television production in the country's history. Alexander Kozintsev wrote that the series was above all popularized in culture by an "immense body of Stierlitz jokes", which entered "urban folklore" according to Birgit Beumers. Russian linguist Gennady Slishkin, who researched the series' influence on vernacular speech, noted that characters' names became synonymous with other words: in fishermen's jargon, 'Stierlitz' became the name for a variant of the common bream, which is known for being hard to catch; among themselves, schoolchildren often referred to the principal and his chief assistant as 'Müller' and 'Bormann'. The same was done by prisoners, when alluding to their jail directors.

== Historical accuracy ==
Walter Laqueur criticized Semyonov's presentation of the events surrounding the Wolff-Dulles negotiations, claiming the author chose a "sinister interpretation of history" because a more correct depiction would "have hardly served" him. Although the talks were described as an "imperialist intrigue... What happened was much simpler": Vyacheslav Molotov was informed on the channel beforehand, and Dulles did not even object to the inclusion of the Soviets in the talks; it was Averell Harriman who convinced Roosevelt not to allow them to participate.

While holding the opinion that Germany, as presented in Seventeen Moments of Spring, resembled the Soviet Union more than its real counterpart, Russian historian Konstantin Zalesski also noted numerous inaccuracies, errors and inconsistencies in the series. In his 2006 book, Seventeen Moments of Spring: A Distorting Mirror of the Third Reich, Zalesski pointed out many such. For example, while Pastor Schlag is supposedly a Catholic priest, he possesses all the characteristics of a Lutheran one, including the title 'pastor'; Müller is decorated with the Honour Chevron for the Old Guard, although he only joined the NSDAP in 1939; Stierlitz and Schlag listen to Édith Piaf's Milord, released in 1959; all members of the SS are seen to wear black uniform – which were replaced by gray ones already in 1938 – and frequently smoke, in spite of the campaign to ban this habit; Gestapo uses transistorized pocket recorders of 1960s. In addition, Joseph Goebbels, Hermann Göring and Heinrich Himmler all had university degrees, rather than merely secondary education, as claimed in the series: Goebbels became the Gauleiter of Berlin in 1926, not in 1944. At one point, footage of Julius Streicher is presented as if he were Robert Ley. Another incorrect detail was Friedrich Krüger's portrayal as the SS and Police Leader in Poland in early 1945, while he was relieved from this position in November 1943.

== Spin-offs and parodies ==
In 2009, several international companies were hired by Russia to colorize the series. High costs and technical difficulties resulted in the removal of much footage from the original episodes. The new version was subject for criticism upon broadcast, including for the poor quality of the new format; the Communist Party of St. Petersburg led a campaign against it.

Stierlitz was also the hero of other films and television series made throughout the years, including the 1975 Diamonds for the Dictatorship of the Proletariat, the 1976 The Life and Death of Ferdinand Luce, the 1980 Spanish Variant and the 2009 Isaev.

Samizdat parodies of Seventeen Moments of Spring were distributed already in the 1970s, as well as such approved by the authorities. The 2008 Russian film Hitler Goes Kaput! was mainly intended as comical reinterpretation of Seventeen Moments. Russian spy Anna Chapman starred in a parody of the scene in which Stierlitz and his wife met, broadcast by the Russian Channel 1 for the 2011 New Year's Eve.

== See also ==
- The Shield and the Sword, a 1968 Soviet spy television series in four parts set during World War II.

== Bibliography ==
- Phillip Knightley (1998). The Second Oldest Profession: Spies and Spying in the Twentieth Century. Penguin. ISBN 978-0-14-010655-8.
- Vladimir Solovʹev; Elena Klepikova (1983). Yuri Andropov: A Secret Passage into the Kremlin. Macmillan. ISBN 978-0-02-612290-0.
- Walter Laqueur (1990). Soviet Realities : Culture and Politics from Stalin to Gorbachev. Transaction. ISBN 0-88738-302-5.
- David MacFadyen (2001). Red Stars: Personality and the Soviet Popular Song, 1955–1991. Mcgill Queens. ISBN 978-0-7735-2106-3.
- David MacFadyen (2007). Russian Television Today: Primetime Drama and Comedy. Routledge. ISBN 978-0-415-42462-2.
- Klaus Mehnert (1983). The Russians and their Favorite Books. Hoover Institution Press. ISBN 978-0-8179-7821-1.
- Ivan Zasursky (2004). Media and Power in post-Soviet Russia. M.E. Sharpe. ISBN 978-0-7656-0863-5.
- Yuri Vorontsov (1980). Phenomenon of the Soviet Cinema. Imported Publishing. ISBN 978-0-8285-1874-1.
- Bart McDowell; Dean Conger (1977). Journey across Russia: the Soviet Union Today. National Geographic Society. ISBN 978-0-87044-220-9.
- Oleg Kharkhordin (1999). The Collective and the Individual in Russia: A Study of Practices. University of California Press. ISBN 978-0-520-21604-4.
- Richard Stites (1992). Russian Popular Culture: Entertainment and Society Since 1900. Cambridge University Press. ISBN 0-521-36214-8.
- Dmitri Volkogonov; Harold Shukman (1999). Autopsy for an Empire: The Seven Leaders Who Built the Soviet Regime. Touchstone. ISBN 978-0-684-87112-7.
- Anthony Olcott (2001). Russian Pulp: the Detektiv and the Russian Way of Crime. Rowman and Littlefield. ISBN 978-0-7425-1140-8.
- Birgit Beumers (1999). Pop Culture Russia!: Media, Arts, and Lifestyle. ABC-CLIO. ISBN 9781851094592.
- Vladimir Medvedev (1994). Chelovek za Spinoi. Ruslit. ISBN 978-5-91487-010-9.
- Richard Taylor; D. W. Spring (1993). Stalinism and Soviet Cinema. Routledge. ISBN 978-0-415-07285-4.
- Richard Sakwa (2008). Putin: Russia's Choice. Routledge. ISBN 978-0-415-40766-3.
- Vladimir Shlapentokh (1991). Soviet Intellectuals and Political Power: the Post-Stalin Era. I.B. Tauris. ISBN 978-1-85043-284-5.
- Stephen Lovell (2010). The Shadow of War: Russia and the USSR, 1941 to the Present. Wiley-Blackwell. ISBN 978-1-4051-6959-2.
- Adele Marie Barker (1999). Consuming Russia: Popular Culture, Sex, and Society since Gorbachev. Duke University Press. ISBN 978-0-8223-2313-6.
- Mikhail Geller (1988). Cogs in the Wheel: The Formation of Soviet Man. Knopf. ISBN 978-0-394-56926-0.
- Stephen Shenfield (2001). Russian Fascism: Traditions, Tendencies, Movements. M.E. Sharpe. ISBN 978-0-7656-0634-1.
- Alexander Kozintsev (2010). The Mirror of Laughter. Transaction. ISBN 978-1-4128-1099-9.
- Birgit Beumers; Stephen C. Hutchings; Natalia Rulyova (2008). The Post-Soviet Russian Media: Conflicting Signals. Routledge. ISBN 978-0-415-67487-4.
- Konstantin Zaleski (2006). Semnadcat Mgnovenij Vesny : Krivoe Zerkalo Tretego Rejcha. Veche. ISBN 978-5-9533-1460-2.

=== Articles ===
- Theimer Nepomnyashchy, Catharine (2002). "The Blockbuster Miniseries on Soviet TV: Isaev-Stierliz, the Ambiguous Hero of Seventeen Moments in Spring" (PDF). The Soviet and Post-Soviet Review. 29. BRILL: 257–276. doi:10.1163/187633202X00044. ISSN 1075-1262. Archived from the original (PDF) on April 6, 2012.
