= Front Without Flanks =

- Russian poster
- Russian: Фронт без флангов
- Directed by: Igor Gostev
- Written by: Semyon Dneprov; Semyon Tsvigun
- Starring: Vyacheslav Tikhonov; Oleg Zhakov; Aleksandr Denisov; Tofik Mirzoyev; Semyon Morozov
- Cinematography: Aleksandr Kharitonov
- Edited by: L. Nisunova; V. Yankovskiy
- Music by: Veniamin Basner
- Release date: 1975
- Country: Soviet Union
- Language: Russian

Front Without Flanks (Russian: Фронт без флангов, romanized: Front bez flangov) is a 1975 Soviet World War II film directed by Igor Gostev.

The film is the first part in a trilogy directed by Igor Gostev about partisan resistance against the Nazi occupation of the Soviet Union during WWII. The second part is Front Beyond the Front Line (1977). The third part is Front in the Rear of the Enemy (1981). All three screenplays were written by KGB Officer Semyon Tsvigun.

Vyacheslav Tikhonov starred as Soviet Army Officer Mlynsky, the commander of the partisan group in all three films.

== Plot ==
The film takes place in August, 1941. The Red Army is moving east. Major Mlynsky leads a detachment that begins to fight the invaders in the rear lines.

== Cast ==
- Vyacheslav Tikhonov as Ivan Mlynskiy
- Oleg Zhakov as Matvey Yegorovich
- Aleksandr Denisov as Vakulenchuk
- Tofik Mirzoyev as Gasan Aliyev
- Semyon Morozov as Seryogin
- Galina Polskikh as Zina
- Aleksey Borzunov as leytenant Petrenko
- Ivan Pereverzev as Pavel
- Yevgeny Shutov
- Vladimir Ivashov as Afanasyev
