= Front Beyond the Front Line =

- Russian: Фронт за линией фронта
- Directed by: Igor Gostev
- Written by: Semyon Dneprov; Semyon Tsvigun
- Starring: Vyacheslav Tikhonov; Ivan Lapikov; Galina Polskikh; Valeriya Zaklunnaya; Oleg Zhakov
- Cinematography: Aleksandr Kharitonov
- Music by: Veniamin Basner
- Release date: 1977
- Running time: 164 minute
- Country: Soviet Union
- Language: Russian

Front Beyond the Front Line (Russian: Фронт за линией фронта, romanized: Front za liniey fronta) is a 1977 Soviet war film directed by Igor Gostev.

The film is the second part in a trilogy directed by Igor Gostev about partisan resistance against the Nazi occupation of the Soviet Union during WWII. The first part is Front Without Flanks (1975). The third part is Front in the Rear of the Enemy (1981). All three screenplays were written by KGB Officer Semyon Tsvigun.

Vyacheslav Tikhonov starred as Soviet Army Officer Mlynsky, the commander of the partisan group in all three films.

== Plot ==
Winter, 1943-1944. The war is stretching into its third year. Major Mlynsky, the commander of a partisan group is promoted to Lt. Colonel. Meanwhile the Germans are working on a super weapon and have created a fake partisan detachment. Inevitably the two detachments clash.

== Cast ==
- Vyacheslav Tikhonov as Colonel Mlynsky
- Ivan Lapikov as Yerofeich
- Galina Polskikh as Nurse Zina
- Valeriya Zaklunnaya as Irina Petrovna
- Oleg Zhakov as Matvey
- Yevgeniy Matveev
- Igor Ledogorov as Andrei Afanasyev-Raysner
- Georgiy Nikolaenko as Lieutenant Gorshkov
- Evgeniy Shutov
- Ivan Pereverzev as Father Pavel
