= Diamonds for the Dictatorship of the Proletariat =

1975 film directed by Grigori Kromanov

- Directed by: Grigori Kromanov
- Starring: Vladimir Ivashov
- Cinematography: Yuri Sillart
- Edited by: Virve Laev
- Music by: Arvo Pärt
- Production company: Tallinnfilm
- Release date: 1975
- Running time: 151 minutes
- Country: Soviet Union
- Language: Russian

Diamonds for the Dictatorship of the Proletariat (Estonian: Briljandid proletariaadi diktatuurile) is a 1975 Soviet crime action film directed by Grigori Kromanov and based on the novel of the same name by Yulian Semyonov.

== Plot ==
In 1921, Chekist Gleb Bokii receives an encrypted message from Tallinn that there is an organization in Russia that is engaged in the theft of jewels from Gokhran and illegally smuggling them through the Baltic states to London and Paris. The investigation of the case is entrusted to a young employee of the Cheka Vsevolod Vladimirov.

== Cast ==
- Vladimir Ivashov as Isayev
- Alexander Kaidanovsky as Vorontsov
- Yekaterina Vasilyeva as Anna Viktorovna
- Tatyana Samoylova as Maria Olenetskaya
- Margarita Terekhova as Vera, Vorontsov's ex-wife
- Edita Piekha as Lida Bosse (voiced by Svetlana Svetlichnaya)
- Alexander Porokhovshchikov as Osip Shelehes
- Armen Dzhigarkhanyan as Roman (Fyodor Shelehes)
- Lev Durov as Nikolay Pozhamchi
- Vladimir Osenev as Stopansky
- Mikk Mikiver as Arthur Neumann, chief of political intelligence in Estonia
- Algimantas Masiulis as Otto Nolmar
- Heino Mandri as Karl Yurla
- Leonhard Merzin as Auguste
- Ants Eskola as Heino Marchand
- Arvo Pärt as pianist in a restaurant
