= Yevdokiya =

- Russian: Евдокия
- Directed by: Tatyana Lioznova
- Written by: Vera Panova
- Produced by: Boris Krakovsky
- Starring: Lyudmila Khityaeva; Nikolai Lebedev; Lyuba Basova; Olga Narovchatova; Alevtina Rumyantseva
- Cinematography: Pyotr Kataev; Iosif Martov
- Edited by: Yevgeniya Abdirkina; Vera Vasileva
- Music by: Leonid Afanasyev
- Production company: Gorky Film Studio
- Release date: 1961
- Running time: 106 min.
- Country: Soviet Union
- Language: Russian

Yevdokiya (Russian: Евдокия) is a 1961 Soviet melodrama film directed by Tatyana Lioznova.

== Plot ==
The film tells about the worker Yevdokim and his wife Yevdokiya, who live in a small town in the province and raise foster children. Their life is full of bright passions and moments.

== Cast ==
- Lyudmila Khityaeva as Yevdokiya
- Nikolai Lebedev as Yevdokim
- Alevtina Rumyantseva as Natalia
  - Lyuba Basova as Natalia in childhood
  - Olga Narovchatova as Natalia in youth
- Vladimir Ivashov as Pavel Chernyshev
- Yevgeni Anufriyev as Andrey
- Aleksandr Barsov
- Vera Altayskaya as Anna Shkapidar
- Valentin Zubkov as Porokhin
- Ivan Ryzhov as Ivan Yegorovich Shestyorkin
