= Vyacheslav Tikhonov =

Soviet and Russian actor (1928–2009)

- Вячеслав Тихонов
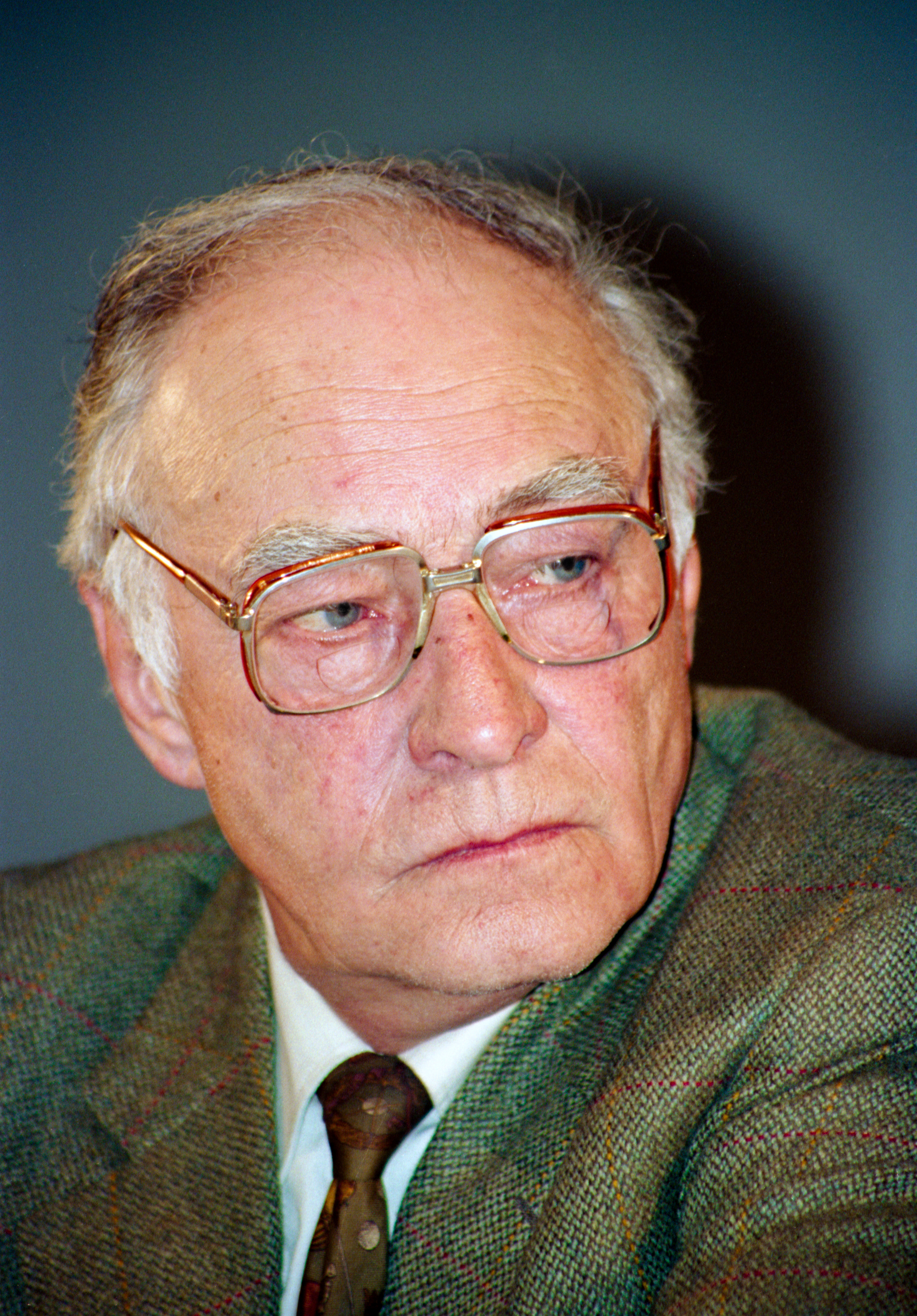
- Tikhonov in 1998
- Born: Vyacheslav Vasilyevich Tikhonov; 8 February 1928; Pavlovsky Posad, Russian SFSR, Soviet Union
- Died: 4 December 2009 (aged 81); Moscow, Russia
- Resting place: Novodevichy Cemetery, Moscow
- Occupation: Actor
- Years active: 1948–2009
- Spouses: Nonna Mordyukova (m. 1948; div. 1963); Tamara Tikhonova (m. 1968)
- Children: 2

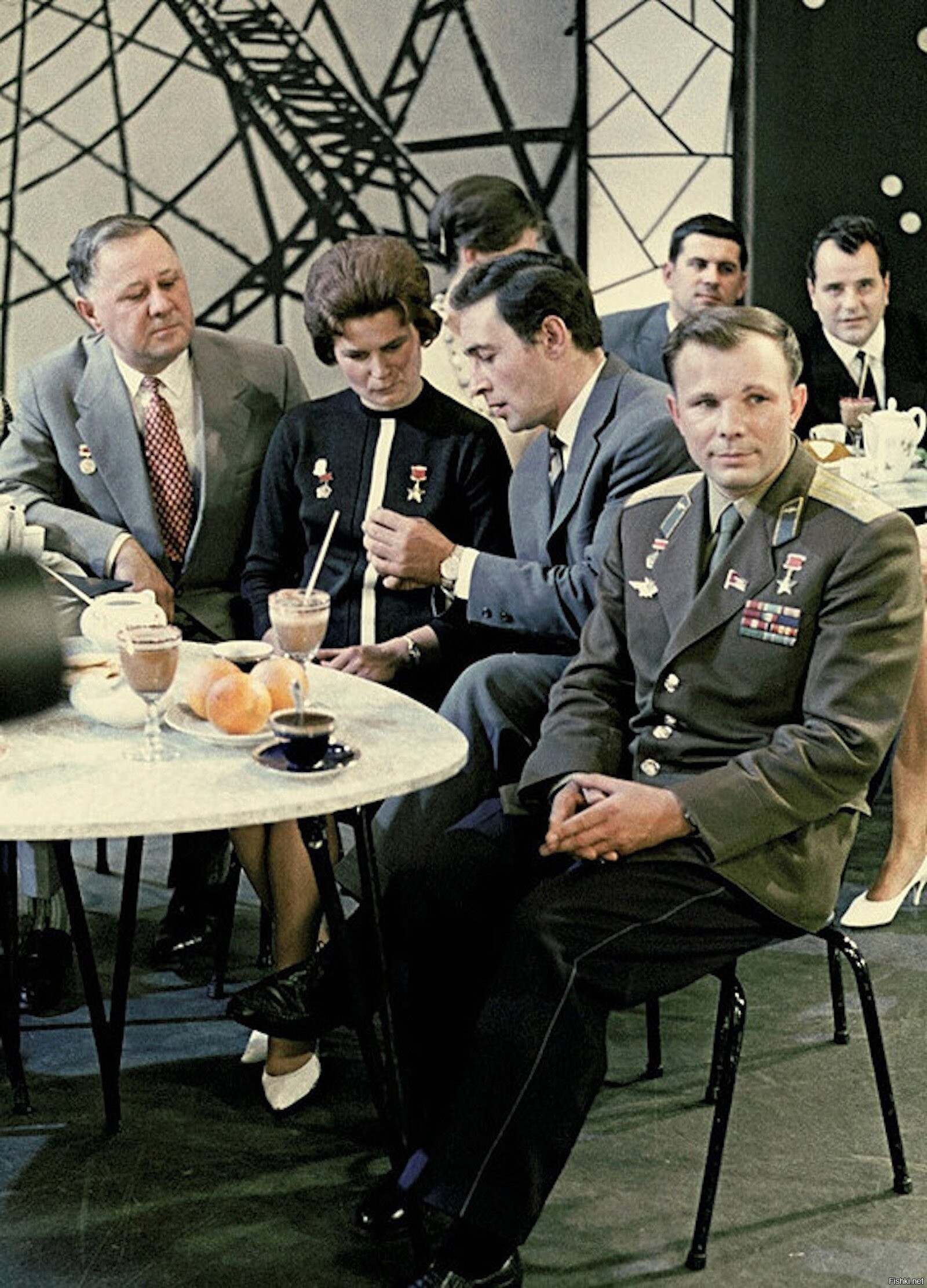
Vyacheslav Tikhonov (front row, seated between Yuri Gagarin and Valentina Tereshkova) appears on a Soviet New Year TV show in 1963.

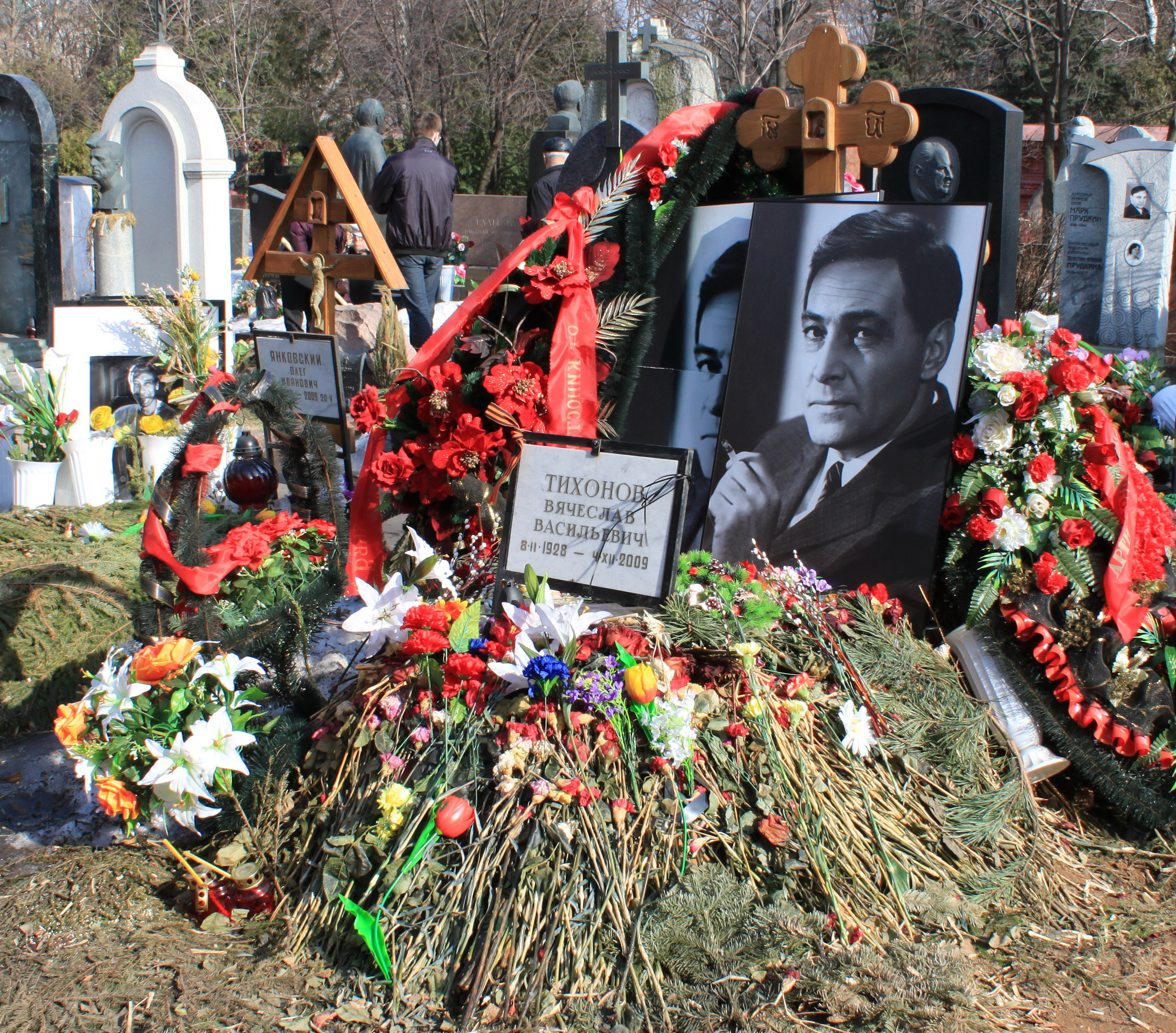
Vyacheslav Tikhonov's grave

Vyacheslav Vasilyevich Tikhonov (Russian: Вячеслав Васильевич Тихонов; 8 February 1928 – 4 December 2009) was a Soviet and Russian actor whose best-known role was as Soviet spy Stierlitz in the television series Seventeen Moments of Spring. He was a recipient of numerous state awards, including the titles of People's Artist of the USSR (1974) and Hero of Socialist Labour (1982).

== Biography ==
Tikhonov was born in Pavlovsky Posad near Moscow. His mother was a kindergarten teacher and his father an engineer in the local textile factory. Vyacheslav dreamed of acting but his parents envisioned a different career, and during the war he worked in a munitions factory. After employment as a metal worker, he began [training for an] acting career in 1945 by entering, not without difficulty, the Actors’ Faculty of VGIK. After graduating from VGIK with honours in 1950, he began his acting career on the stage of the Theatre Studio of Film Actor, where he worked for six years.

In 1948, he married Nonna Mordyukova, a popular actress at the time. The couple had one son, Vladimir, also an actor, who died in 1990. The marriage was dissolved in 1963. Later, Tikhonov married a second time to Tamara Ivanovna Tikhonova and had one child with her, Anna Tikhonova, also an actor, in 1969.

He died on 4 December 2009 in Moscow, Russia. Russian President Dmitry Medvedev expressed his condolences to Tikhonov's family.

== Career ==
Tikhonov made his film debut in 1948. For the next few years, he appeared in relatively low-profile films and at the Film Actors' Studio Theatre in Smolensk.

Tikhonov became more well known with the release of the rural family drama It Happened in Penkovo (1958), which was followed by several wartime dramas: May Stars (1959), set in Prague, and On the Seven Winds (1962), on the Western Front. In Yevgeny Tashkov's Thirst (1959), based on real events, Tikhonov, in the first of his spy roles, portrays a scout in an operation to free an Odessa water plant from the Nazis.

In Two Lives (1961) Tikhonov plays the less fortunate of two men who unwittingly meet in France, 40-odd years after fighting on opposite sides of the 1917 Revolution. Rostotsky's We'll Live Till Monday (1968), in which a history teacher plans to defend a student at a disciplinary meeting, earned Tikhonov a state prize. In 1979, Rostotsky made a documentary about his friend, called Profession: Film Actor."

Tikhonov also played Prince Andrei Bolkonsky in the Oscar-winning adaptation of Leo Tolstoy's War and Peace (1968) by Sergei Bondarchuk (who played Bezukhov). But Tikhonov reportedly got the role only at the suggestion of the Minister of Culture when Innokenty Smoktunovsky opted for Kozintsev's Hamlet, and Oleg Strizhenov was also unavailable.

In 1973, Tikhonov starred in the role for which he is most known in the former Soviet republics, when director Tatiana Lioznova chose him over Smoktunovsky to star in an adaptation of Yulian Semyonov's novel Seventeen Moments of Spring as Standartenführer Stierlitz. The 17 moments are 17 days in the spring of 1945, just before the defeat of Nazi Germany in World War II and centers around attempts by some of the Soviet Union's men in Germany to thwart secret peace talks between the Nazis and the U.S. and Britain. The film enjoyed enormous popularity among Russian viewers of several generations. Prior to that, however, it had faced the risk of remaining unknown: Mikhail Suslov had opposed the film's going on general release. He had claimed that the film did not show the feat of the Soviet people in the war. Fortunately, the decision to release the would-be classic film was supported by KGB Chairman Yuri Andropov. Although several of Semyonov's Stierlitz novels were adapted for the screen, Tikhonov did not return, perhaps feeling that the original series was definitive. The role won him the title People's Artist of the Soviet Union, one of several awards.

In 1976, Tikhonov rejoined Bondarchuk in an adaptation of Mikhail Sholokhov's They Fought for Their Country. It suited Tikhonov by concentrating on character rather than histrionics and won him another state prize in the year that he finally joined the Communist Party. 1977 saw a change of pace with Rostotsky's Oscar-nominated White Bim the Black Ear, in which Tikhonov played a middle-aged writer who is "adopted" by a non-pedigree setter puppy.

Though he was often typecast as a militiaman or spy, there were good roles among them, such as the KGB general in the Cold War thriller TaSS is authorised to announce (1984), another television series based on a Semyonov novel. In later years he was able to display a wider range, including the bishop in Besy, a film version of Dostoyevsky's The Devils (1992) and Charlemagne, in the Ubit Drakona (To Kill a Dragon, 1998) after Evgeny Shvarts's wartime satire. Shvarts was inspired by Hans Christian Andersen, and Tikhonov appeared in Eldar Ryazanov's fantasy-biography of the Danish fabulist, Andersen: Life Without Love (2006), playing God. On 8 February 2003, Russian President Vladimir Putin awarded the Order of Merit for the Fatherland, third degree, to Tikhonov.

Tikhonov appeared in Nikita Mikhalkov's Oscar-winning Burnt By the Sun (1994) and also appeared in the 2010 sequel, which finished shooting before his death.

== Filmography ==
=== Film ===
Year	Title	Russian Title	Role	Notes
1948	The Young Guard	Молодая гвардия	Volodya Osmukhin	Directed by Sergei Gerasimov; Won the Stalin Prize in 1949
1951	In Peaceful Time	В мирные дни	sailor Volodya Grinevsky, torpedoman	
1951	Taras Shevchenko	Тарас Шевченко	Representative of the St Petersburg youth	
1952	Maximka	Максимка	Lieutenant Goreilov	
1954	This Should Never Be Forgotten	Об этом забывать нельзя	student Rostaslav Danchenko	
1955	Stars On the Wings of an Airplane	Звёзды на крыльях	pilot Olexa Lavrinets	
1956	The Heart is Beating Again	Сердце бьётся вновь	Leonid V. Golubev	
1958	It Happened in Penkovo	Дело было в Пенькове	Matvey Morozov	
1958	E.A. — Extraordinary Accident	ЧП. Чрезвычайное происшествие	a sailor Viktor Raisky	
1959	May Stars	Майские звёзды	lieutenant Andrew Rukavichkin	
1959	Thirst	Жажда	lieutenant Oleg Bezborodko	
1960	Midshipman Panin	Мичман Панин	Midshipman Basil Panin	
1961	Two Lives	Две жизни	Duke Sergei Nashchekin	
1962	Seven Winds	На семи ветрах	Captain Vyacheslav Suzdalev	
1963	Optimistic Tragedy	Оптимистическая трагедия	Alexei, anarchist-sailor	
1965	A Hero of Our Time	Герой нашего времени	Grigory Alexandrovich Pechorin	Voice
1965–1967	War and Peace	Война и мир	Andrei Nikolayevich Bolkonsky	part 1–5
1968	We'll Live Till Monday	Доживём до понедельника	Ilya Semyonovich Melnikov – History Teacher	
1969	Family Happiness	Семейное счастье	Nikolai Andreyevich Kapitonov, notary	
1970	The Roundabout	Карусель	master of the house	
1970	One of us	Один из нас	spy Keller	Voice
1971	Hold on to the clouds	Держись за облака	Vladimir Sevastiyanov	Voice
1972	The Man from the Other Side	Человек с другой стороны	Victor Krimov	
1971	Yegor Bulychov and Others	Егор Булычов и другие	parson Pavlin	
1974	Pyotr Martynovich and the Years of Great Life	Пётр Мартынович и годы большой жизни		cameo
1975	Front Without Flanks	Фронт без флангов	Major Ivan Petrovich Mlinsky	
1975	They Fought for Their Country	Они сражались за Родину	Nikolay Strel'tsov	
1975	Story of a Human Heart	Повесть о человеческом сердце		(author's text)
1976	...And Other Officials	... И другие официальные лица	Kostantin Pavlovich Ivanov	
1977	White Bim Black Ear	Белый Бим Черное ухо	Ivan Ivanovich (Master)	
1977	Front Beyond the Front Line	Фронт за линией фронта	Colonel Ivan Petrovich Mlinsky	
1977	Dialogue	Диалог	Alexander Yershov	
1977	Drove through the streets of bureau	По улицам комод водили	master of bureau	
1979	Ballad of Tree and Rose	Písen o stromu a ruzi	Vladimir Kuznetsov	
1981	Unpaid Vacation	Отпуск за свой счёт		Narration
1982	The Rear Front	Фронт в тылу врага	Colonel Ivan Petrovich Mlinsky	
1984	European Story	Европейская история	Peter Losser, political commentator	
1986	Approaching the Аuture	Приближение к будущему	Lunin	
1987	The Appeal	Апелляция	Dmitry V. Plotnikov	
1987	Soul Impatience	Нетерпение души	Panteleymon Lepeshinskiy	
1987	Riders	Наездники	father	
1988	To Kill a Dragon	Убить дракона	Charlemagne	
1989	Love and Privileges	Любовь с привилегиями	Konstantin Gavrilovic Kozhemjakin	
1991	Moscow	Notti di paura	Pyotr	
1991	The Ghosts of the Green Room	Призраки зелёной комнаты	Martin Chiverel	
1992	The Possessed	Бесы	Tikhon, Bishop retired	
1993	Provincial Benefit	Провинциальный бенефис	Ivan Semenovich Velikatov	
1993	Incomparable	Несравненная	Kholev	
1993	The Codex of Disgrace	Кодекс бесчестия	accountant Chugunov	
1994	Burnt by the Sun	Утомлённые солнцем	Vsevolod Konstantinovich	
1994	A Boulevard Romance	Бульварный роман	Stanislav Vasil'evich Kandinski	
1995	An Adventure	Авантюра		cameo appearance
1995	The Codex of Silence 2: Trace of black fish	Кодекс молчания 2: След чёрной рыбы	police colonel Agaev	Voice
1996	Sweet Friend of Years Forgotten Long Ago...	Милый друг давно забытых лет...	Fedor Fedorovich	
1998	Composition for Victory Day	Сочинение ко Дню Победы	Lev Morgulis	
2001	Berlin Express Train	Берлинский экспресс	Georgy Astakhov	
2006	Eyes of the Wolf	Глазами волка	old scientist	
2006	Andersen. A Life without Love	Андерсен. Жизнь без любви	God	(final film role)

=== Television ===
Year	Title	Russian Title	Role	Notes
1973	Seventeen Moments of Spring	Семнадцать мгновений весны	Max Otto von Stierlitz	12 episodes
1984	TASS Is Authorized to Declare...	ТАСС уполномочен заявить...	KGB General Konstantinov	10 episodes
1998	Waiting Room	Зал ожидания	Mikhail Zaitsev, director of the orphanage	

== Legacy ==
- The name of Vyacheslav Tikhonov is given to the marine vessel of geophysical exploration of the shipping company Sovcomflot (launched in August 2011, the flag was raised on 16 September 2011).
- In May 2013, a monument by sculptor Alexey Blagovestnov was installed on the actor's grave. The monument reflects the versatility of Tikhonov's talent. The bronze figure is located in front of the relief on the gospel story Adoration of the Magi, which depicts many biblical characters.
- A Commemorative plaque is installed on the building of Lyceum No. 2 in Pavlovsky Posad (the former school No. 1, where the actor studied), now bearing his name.
- Since 2017, the Vyacheslav Tikhonov International Film Festival, called "17 Moments", has been held. The initiator of the festival was the actor's daughter Anna.
- On 25 August 2018, the V. Tikhonov House-museum was opened in Pavlovsky Posad in the house where the actor was born and grew up.
- 2019 — Volodarsky Street in Pavlovsky Posad was renamed Tikhonov Street.
- On 20 May 2022, a monument to Vyacheslav Tikhonov was unveiled in Pavlovsky Posad. The monument made of bronze and granite is installed at the intersection of Herzen and Kirov streets.
