= It Happened in Penkovo =

1958 film

- Directed by: Stanislav Rostotsky
- Written by: Stanislav Rostotsky
- Produced by: G. Kuperschmidt
- Starring: Maya Menglet; Svetlana Druzhinina; Vyacheslav Tikhonov
- Cinematography: Georgy Gharibyan
- Edited by: Yevgenia Abdirkina
- Music by: Kirill Molchanov
- Production company: Gorky Film Studio
- Release date: 1958
- Running time: 100 minutes
- Country: Soviet Union
- Language: Russian

It Happened in Penkovo (Russian: Дело было в Пенькове, translit. Delo bylo v Penkove) is a 1958 Soviet romantic drama film directed by Stanislav Rostotsky. Film based on the novel of Sergey Antonov.

== Plot ==
Matvey Morozov on his way home from prison recalls his story:

Matvey, a Soviet collective farm (kolkhoz) tractor-driver, lives in the village of Penkovo. He is a funny guy, but sometimes his jokes bring him trouble. Once he sets up a tug-of-war on tractors, breaks his tractor and nearly escapes criminal charges for that. Matvey is in love with the daughter of the chairman of the collective farm, Larissa, though her father strongly opposes their relationship. But soon Matvey and Larissa get married.

Tonya, a recently graduated livestock specialist, arrives at the farm from Leningrad; she has her roots in the village where her grandfather lives, but she has seen and absorbed new, Soviet life principles and has more education than farm workers. She becomes active in many nationally authorized progressive changes in the life of the villagers, and inspires young people to build a new club. She also boldly wears no head scarf unlike village girls and goes in a suit, not traditional rural dresses.

Matvey falls in love with Tonya, apparently attracted by an educated girl from the city, she loves him too and is struggling to contain and hide her feelings. But when he explains his feelings to her, Tonya says she "would not break his marriage". Meanwhile Larissa becomes terribly jealous. Alevtina, a newsmonger and the owner of local unofficial club, persuades Larissa to poison her rival, but at the last moment Larissa changes her mind and strikes the poisoned cup of tea from Tonya's hands. Larissa tells Matvey about it, and he punishes Alevtina for that: he locks her half-naked in the basement, causing minor injuries. Matvey goes to jail for that.

In the end Matvey joyfully returns home to his wife Larissa and a new-born son.

== Cast ==
- Maya Menglet as Tonya Glechikova
- Svetlana Druzhinina as Larissa
- Vyacheslav Tikhonov as Matvey Morozov
- Vladimir Ratomskiy as Ivan Savich, the chairman of the collective farm, Larissa`s father
- Valentina Telegina as local newsmonger Alevtina
- Anatoly Kubatsky as Glechikov
- Yuri Medvedev as Zefirov
- Aleksandra Kharitonova as Szurochka
- Vladimir Troshin as lecturer Krutikov
- Ivan Ryzhov as farmer

== Awards ==
- All-Union Film Festival: Third Prize (Stanislav Rostotsky)
