= At Early Morning =

- Russian: Рано утром
- Directed by: Tatyana Lioznova
- Written by: Vera Panova
- Starring: Nikolay Merzlikin; Valeriy Nosik; Nina Nikitina; Olga Bobkova; Oleg Zhakov
- Cinematography: Pyotr Kataev
- Release date: 1965
- Country: Soviet Union
- Language: Russian

At Early Morning (Russian: Рано утром) is a 1965 Soviet drama film directed by Tatyana Lioznova.

Alyosha and Nadia early lose their parents, but the father's friend and the people around him help them to maintain kindness and openness.

== Plot ==
After the death of their father, high school senior Alyosha and his younger sister Nadya are left to navigate life alone. Determined to protect his sister, Alyosha takes a job at a factory and refuses to send Nadya to an orphanage, despite the advice of others. When their aunt Zhanna Vasilyevna arrives from Arkhangelsk and offers to take Nadya in, Alyosha declines, choosing to raise her himself. As Alyosha juggles work and caregiving, he begins a relationship with Lyusya, their neighbor, but their romance falls apart when she demands more of his time. Meanwhile, Nadya grows up and starts school, gradually adjusting to her new life. Later, after completing eighth grade, she joins a factory herself. At work, Nadya becomes infatuated with Olya, a confident and glamorous colleague who represents a lifestyle Nadya dreams of. However, her illusions are shattered when Olya’s boyfriend, Kostya, is revealed to be a thief and is arrested after a night out.

Seeking connection, Alyosha and Nadya visit their aunt in Arkhangelsk, only to find her husband harsh and critical of young people. The siblings quickly decide to return home. At the factory, Dima, a technician, begins courting Nadya, but she finds him unremarkable. He sends her an anonymous ticket to Romeo and Juliet, sparking her curiosity. Before the play, tragedy strikes when Dima dies in a motorcycle accident. Though initially reluctant, Nadya visits him in the hospital, only to learn he has passed away. Devastated, she finds herself crying outside the theater, where a kind stranger offers her comfort. Life moves forward as Alyosha announces his decision to marry, bringing more changes to their household. One day, while leaving the factory, Nadya notices the same stranger waiting for her. Their meeting hints at a hopeful new chapter in her life.

== Cast ==
- Nikolay Merzlikin as Alesha Smirnov
- Valeriy Nosik as Dimka
- Nina Nikitina as Nadya Smirnova
- Olga Bobkova as Nadya Smirnova
- Oleg Zhakov as Nikolai Nikolaevich
- Nina Sazonova as Galina Petrovna
- Zinaida Vorkul as Olya's mother
- Margarita Lifanova as Zhanna Vasilyevna
- Yelena Maksimova as Dimka's mother
- Ivan Ryzhov as Dmitri Dmitrievich
