= Stierlitz =

Russian fictional espionage character

Max Otto von Stierlitz
- The Stierlitz novels character
- Vyacheslav Tikhonov portraying Stierlitz
- First appearance: No Password Required, 1966 novel
- Last appearance: Isaev, 2009 television series
- Created by: Yulian Semyonov
- Portrayed by: Rodion Nakhapetov (1967); Vladimir Zamansky (1968); Vyacheslav Tikhonov (1973); Vladimir Ivashov (1975); Vsevolod Safonov (1976); Uldis Dumpis (1980); Vasily Antonov (2001); Pavel Derevyanko (2008); Daniil Strakhov (2009)
- Voiced by: Vyacheslav Tikhonov (1984)

In-universe information
- Aliases: Bruno, Bolsen, Max, Massimo etc.
- Gender: Male
- Title(s): Polkovnik (USSR); SS-Standartenführer (Germany)
- Occupation: Secret agent
- Affiliation: People's Commissariat for State Security (USSR); Reich Security Main Office (Germany)
- Family: Vladimir Vladimirov (father); Olesia Prokopchuk (mother)
- Spouse: Alexandra Gavrilina
- Children: Alexander Vladimirov
- Nationality: Soviet

Max Otto von Stierlitz (Russian: Макс О́тто фон Шти́рлиц, IPA: [ˈʂtʲirlʲɪts]) is the lead character in a Russian book series written in the 1960s by Yulian Semyonov, and the television adaptation Seventeen Moments of Spring (starring Vyacheslav Tikhonov) as well as feature films (produced in the Soviet era) and a number of sequels and prequels. Other actors portrayed Stierlitz in several other films. Stierlitz has become a stereotypical spy in Soviet and post-Soviet culture, similar to James Bond in Western culture. American historian Erik Jens has described Stierlitz as the "most popular and venerable hero of Russian spy fiction".

== Character origins ==
The culture of Imperial Russia was very strongly influenced by that of France, and Russian writers accordingly shared the disdain traditionally held by French writers towards spy novels, which was seen as a lowbrow type of literature. In the Soviet Union, espionage was depicted before 1961 as something committed against the Soviet state by its enemies and not as an activity that the Soviet state itself engaged in. Perhaps the best example of this attitude was the founding of SMERSH in 1943, which was an acronym for the wartime slogan Smert' shpionam! ("Death to Spies!"), which reflected the picture promoted by the Soviet state of spies as a disreputable type of person who deserved to be killed without mercy. Furthermore, the legacy of the Yezhovshchina and other Stalinist repression had given the Chekisty, as secret policemen are always called in Russia, a very negative image. In November 1961, Vladimir Semichastny became chairman of the KGB and set out to improve the image of the Chekisty.

Semichastny wanted to erase the memory of the Yezhovshchina and give the KGB a more positive image. It was during his tenure as KGB chairman from 1961 to 1967 that the cult of the "hero spies" began in the Soviet Union, the Soviet media lionising the achievements of spies such as Harold "Kim" Philby, Richard Sorge, and Colonel Rudolf Abel. Inspired by the popularity of the James Bond novels in the West, Semichastny also encouraged Soviet writers to write novels featuring heroic Chekisty as their heroes. One such novel was No Password Required (1966) by Yulian Semyonov, set in the Russian Civil War, which marked the first appearance of the heroic Cheka agent Maxim Maximovich Isaуev. In 1967, Semichastny was replaced as KGB chairman by Yuri Andropov who likewise encouraged writers to publish novels featuring heroic Chekisty.

In January–February 1969, the novel Seventeen Moments of Spring by Semyonov, a sequel to No Password Required, was serialized in Pravda and published as a book later in 1969. The novel was set in Berlin in March-May 1945 as the Red Army advanced onto Berlin, causing the Nazis to become more desperate while Isayev, who has gone undercover in Berlin under the alias Max Otto von Stierlitz, outmaneuvers their plans. Impressed by the favorable public response to Seventeen Moments of Spring, Andropov pressed to have the book adopted as a television mini-series, which was filmed in 1971–72. Seventeen Moments of Spring was one of the most expensive Soviet television productions ever filmed, being shot on a lavish scale that was unusual for Soviet television. All of the leading parts were played by famous and well respected actors, which certainly contributed to its appeal. The mini-series caused much protest by the Red Army, who complained that the series gave the impression that it was the NKVD that won the Great Patriotic War, as the war with Germany is known in the Soviet Union. The director Tatyana Lioznova was subsequently ordered to add in new scenes showing the Red Army advancing and taking Berlin, which added another year to its production, causing the mini-series to debut in 1973 instead of 1972 as planned. To save money and give a sense of authenticity, the battle scenes Lioznova added were mostly stock footage from the war. The mini-series Seventeen Moments of Spring was another enormous hit in 1973, attracting an average of 30–40 million viewers per night and turning the Isayev character into a cultural phenomena in the Soviet Union.

== Character ==
In Seventeen Moments of Spring, Stierlitz is the cover name for a Soviet super-spy Colonel Maxim Maximovich Isaуev (Макси́м Макси́мович Иса́ев), whose real name is Vsevolod Vladimirovich Vladimirov (Все́волод Влади́мирович Владимиров).

Stierlitz is assigned a role in the SS Reich Security Main Office (German: Reichssicherheitshauptamt) in Berlin during World War II, infiltrating Ausland-SD (foreign intelligence) headed by Walter Schellenberg. Working deep undercover, Stierlitz tries to collect intelligence about the Germans' war plans and communicate it to Moscow. He receives instructions from Moscow on how to proceed, on one occasion traveling to Switzerland on a secret mission. He diverts the German nuclear "Vengeance Weapon" research program into a fruitless dead-end, thwarts separate peace talks between Nazi Germany, the United Kingdom and the United States, engages in intellectual games with members of the Nazi high command and sacrifices his own happiness for the good of his motherland. Despite being racked with desire to return home to his wife, he subordinates his feelings to his duty, thus embodying an idealised Soviet vision of patriotism.

Stierlitz is quite the opposite of the action-oriented James Bond; most of the time he gains his knowledge without any Bond-style stunts and gadgets, while in the film adaptation of the stories the action is presented through a narrative voice-over by Yefim Kopelyan. He is presented in a deeply patriotic but non-ideological light, fighting to defend the Soviet motherland against external enemies rather than just defending the Communist government against its ideological opponents. Stierlitz engages in a lengthy "battle of the wits" with the Nazi leaders, especially his nemesis the Gestapo chief Heinrich Müller who knows that there is a Soviet spy in Berlin and gradually closes in on Stierlitz. Much of the dramatic tension in both the book and the mini-series comes from the way that Müller, who is portrayed here as a relentless Javert-like figure, moves irrevocably towards the conclusion that Stierlitz is the mole, who in turn knows he can only delay the inevitable, but chooses to stay on as long as possible to sabotage the German war effort as much as he can. In what appeared to be a joke on the part of the mini-series's producers, the part of Müller was played by the Jewish actor Leonid Bronevoy. Unlike the real Müller, a very ambitious and rather crude career policeman whose only interest was power, Bronevoy portrayed Müller as having a certain suave charm whose conversations with Stierlitz, which however pleasant on the surface, were really attempts to probe who he really is.

Using the real-life Operation Sunrise as its inspiration, both the novel and mini-series depicted Allen Dulles, the chief of the American OSS operations for Central Europe engaging in peace talks in Switzerland with Karl Wolff, the Higher SS Police Chief of Italy, which was historically correct; however the picture of the United States seeking an alliance with Nazi Germany against the Soviet Union was not. The picture of Operation Sunrise as an attempt to form an American-German alliance was widely accepted in the Soviet Union and Harrison Salisbury, the Moscow correspondent of The New York Times, found himself in 1973-74 being regularly criticized by ordinary Soviet citizens who fumed at the alleged American perfidy against the Soviet Union during the Dulles-Wolff talks. However, there is a kernel of truth to the version of the Dulles-Wolff talks offered in Seventeen Moments of Spring in that the Soviets were not informed of Operation Sunrise at first, and expressed much suspicion of Operation Sunrise when they did learn of the talks, believing that Dulles was engaged in something underhanded against them.

An aspect of both the novel and TV versions of Seventeen Moments of Spring that has annoyed Westerners who are more accustomed to seeing spy stories via the prism of the fast-paced Bond stories is the way that Stierlitz spends much time interacting with ordinary Germans, whom he meets during his long walks on the streets and parks of Berlin, despite the fact these interactions do little to advance the plot as these scenes are somewhat superfluous to the story. However, the point of these scenes is to show that Stierlitz is still a moral human being, who remains sociable and kind to all people, including the citizens of the state that his country is at war with, despite the way that state has killed millions of his own people. Unlike Bond, Stierlitz is devoted to his wife, whom he deeply loves, and despite spending at least ten years as a spy in Germany and having countless chances to sleep with attractive German women, remains faithful towards her. The brooding, thoughtful and quiet Stierlitz who remains devoted to his wife who he has not seen for years reflects a certain Russian ideal of a romantic hero.

Unlike most Soviet productions, Stierlitz is described as working for Russia rather than the Soviet Union or "the party", suggesting that he is first and foremost a Russian patriot rather than a Communist. Unlike many Soviet productions, most of the ordinary Germans, Stierlitz meets are portrayed in a favorable light with the implied message that the ordinary Germans were not responsible for Nazi crimes. Instead, the message of both the book and the TV show was that ordinary Germans were in a certain sense victims of the Nazi leaders who are shown as treating their own people with a callous contempt.

Though Semnadtsat' mgnoveniy vesny was a state-sponsored production, under the personal supervision of Yuri Andropov, chief of KGB, many people who saw the mini-series viewed the Stierlitz character as a metaphor for dissidents in the Soviet Union. The way that Stierlitz, who despite being in the presence of mostly sympathetic people, has to hide at all times who he really is, what he is really doing and what he really believes, was seen as an inspiring metaphor for dissidents in the Brezhnev era Soviet Union. Much of the Soviet intelligentsia saw parallels between Siterlitz, who can never say what he really feels and their own situation in the Soviet Union, which helped to make the character an iconic figure even to those who feared the KGB, and contributed to his appeal even after the dissolution of the Soviet Union in 1991. The American scholar Erik Jens has argued that the "dog whistles" in the mini-series such as scenes where Stierlitz buys luxury goods on the black markets of Berlin such as French cigarettes and cognac, which he greatly enjoys, which Soviet viewers took as an allegory for buying forbidden Western goods on Soviet black markets (a very common practice in the Soviet Union), were intentionally added in to give the series credibility with the Soviet public. The fact that Stierlitz buys goods on the black markets of Berlin that were otherwise unobtainable in a wartime economy helped to make the character more appealing to a Soviet audience in the 1970s who likewise had to frequently resort to the black markets to obtain basic goods that were not readily available in the stores. Seventeen Moments of Spring was unusual among Soviet television series in having a hero who enjoys certain Western luxuries as normally in Soviet TV Western luxury goods were associated with decadence and corruption and as a result shunned by the protagonists.

Jens noted that while Stierlitz is often called the "Russian James Bond," that description is incorrect as the Stierlitz is "...not nearly as cartoonish or formulaic a figure as Agent 007 or indeed the majority of Western, especially American, fictional spies". Jens argued that the heavy losses taken by the Soviet Union in the Great Patriotic War ensured that Soviet audiences could never accept an ultra-violent figure like James Bond as a hero, instead preferring a merely cerebral, intellectual hero like Stierlitz who wins by his cunning and his intelligence. Jens wrote: "No fictional Russian spy, either approved by the Kremlin or accepted by Soviet citizenry, could take such a cartoonish view of life and death as do James Bond and his countless Western imitations". Jens argued that Stierlitz is far closer to George Smiley rather than James Bond, but that comparison does not entirely work as: "Bond is a pop culture icon, on the same plane as Superman, Tintin, or Mickey Mouse. And however intricately and realistically John le Carré rendered him or how compellingly Gary Oldman or the late Alec Guinness played him on-screen, Smiley remains a creature of the shadowy intelligence world, known mainly to the fans of the genre and having little to say to the wider culture". Jens wrote the character whom Stierlitz mostly closely resembles is Atticus Finch as both characters are "morally complex and admirable" men operating in deeply amoral worlds (the segregationist Deep South of the 1930s, Nazi Germany) who do their best to retain their integrity and work to redeem despised professions (i.e. lawyer, spy). In much the same way, that the part of Atticus Finch came to be identified with Gregory Peck, the part of Stierlitz likewise came to be identified with Vyacheslav Tikhonov, and the Russian people have never really accepted any other actors playing the character. Jens noted that both Finch and Stierlitz play the same role in their respective national cultures as embodying certain ideals about their respective professions as Finch is the sort of lawyer that Americans wish that they had while Stierlitz is the sort of spy that Russians wish that they had.

== Influences in Russian culture ==
Although Stierlitz was a much-loved character, he was also the butt of a common genre of Russian jokes, often satirising his deductive trains of thought, with unexpected twists, often turned absurd, delivered in the deadpan style of the voice-overs in the film adaptations. Many of them untranslatable due to puns. Aleksandra Arkhipova remarked that by her observations, there were 2.5 times more jokes about Stierlitz than about Leonid Brezhnev. Some examples:

Stieglitz sees 28 irons on the windowsill. "The safe house is no longer safe", he concludes.

Stierlitz approaches Berlin. The city is veiled in smoke from the fires. "Forgot to switch off the iron again," thinks Stierlitz with slight irritation.

Stieglitz received a radiogram from the headqurters: "Congrats birth son". A nostalgy swept over Stieglitz: he haven't been home for 20 years already.

After some time the cycle began its own life and many jokes had no relation to the movie altogether.

Stieglitz made a blind shot. The blind dropped dead.

Stieglitz had a thought. He liked it and had another thought.

Stierlitz continues to be a popular character in modern Russia. Despite the fact that references and Stierlitz jokes remain in contemporary speech, Seventeen Moments of Spring is very popular mainly because it is quite patriotic. It is repeated annually on Russian television, usually around Victory Day. Stierlitz also continues to have a political significance. When his actor Vyacheslav Tikhonov died in December 2009, the Foreign Intelligence Service—one of the successor organisations of the former Soviet KGB—sent its condolences to his family. Ivan Zassoursky notes that Russian Prime Minister (and former and current President) Vladimir Putin, a former KGB agent, has been portrayed as "embod[ying] the image—very important for the Russian television audience—of Standartenführer von Stierlitz... If anyone missed the connection between Putin, who served in Germany, and von Stierlitz, articles in the press reminded them of the resemblance and helped create the association." The connection went both ways; Putin was strongly influenced by the novels, commenting: "What amazed me most of all was how one man's effort could achieve what whole armies could not." Putin himself first came to public attention in 1991 when as an aide to Anatoly Sobchak, the mayor of Leningrad (modern St. Petersburg), he performed for Soviet television an iconic scene from the television mini-series, making much of the fact that both he and Stierlitz were Chekisty.

Stierlitz movies contributed a number of catchphrases, such as "Character: nordic, robust" (Характер — нордический, выдержанный, a personal characteristic, usually mocking or ironic), a typical phrase used in brief resumes with which various German characters are introduced in off-plot commentarys.

== Novels with Stierlitz ==
Work	Years portrayed	Years of writing
Бриллианты для диктатуры пролетариата (Diamonds for the Dictatorship of the Proletariat)	1921	1974
Пароль не нужен (No Password Required)	1921–1922	1966
Нежность (Tenderness)	1927	1975
Испанский вариант (Spanish Variant)	1938	1973
Альтернатива (Alternative)	1941	1978
Третья карта (Third Card)	1941	1973
Майор «Вихрь» (Major Whirlwind)	1944–1945	1968
Семнадцать мгновений весны (Seventeen Moments of Spring)	1945	1969
Приказано выжить (The Order is to Survive)	1945	1982
Экспансия — I (Expansion – Part I)	1946	1984
Экспансия — II (Expansion – Part II)	1946	1987
Экспансия — III (Expansion – Part III)	1947	1987
Отчаяние (Despair)	1947–1953	1990
Бомба для председателя (A Bomb for the Chairman)	1967	1970

== Adaptations ==
Year	Work	Type	Actor	Note
1967	No Password Necessary	Film	Rodion Nakhapetov	First adaptation of books.
1973	Seventeen Moments of Spring	Miniseries	Vyacheslav Tikhonov	Considered the most successful Soviet espionage thriller ever made and is one of the most popular television series in Soviet history.
1975	Diamonds for the Dictatorship of the Proletariat	Film	Vladimir Ivashov	
1976	Life and Death of Ferdinand Lues	Miniseries	Vsevolod Safonov	Adaptation of A Bomb for the Chairman.
1980	Spanish Variant	Film	Uldis Dumpis	Character renamed to Schultz
1983	Order is to Survive	Radio Play	Vyacheslav Tikhonov	Direct sequel to Seventeen Moments of Spring.
2009	Isaev	TV series	Daniil Strakhov	Adaptation of No Password Necessary, Diamonds for the Dictatorship of the Proletariat and Tenderness.
2014	Штирлиц. Попытка к бегству	Theater Play	Oleg Gorodetsky	

=== Parodies ===
Year	Work	Type	Actor	Note
2001	Eighteenth Moment of Spring	Film	Vasily Antonov	Parody of Seventeen Moments of Spring.
2008	Hitler Goes Kaput!	Film	Pavel Derevyanko	Parody of Seventeen Moments of Spring.

=== Video games ===
Year	Game	Note
1999	Штырлиц: Операция БЮСТ (Stierlitz: Operation BUST)	Adventure game.
2000	Штырлиц 2: Танго в Пампасах (Stierlitz 2: Tango in the Pampas)	Adventure game. Sequel to Operation BUST.
2002	Штырлиц 3: Агент СССР (Stierlitz 3: Agent of USSR)	Adventure game.
2005	Штырлитц: Открытие Америки (Stierlitz: Discovery of America)	Adventure game.
2005	Штырлитц (Stierlitz)	Platform game for Mobile Phones.
2006	Rush for Berlin	Stierlitz appears in second mission.
2006	Штирлиц 2: Умпут навсегда (Stierlitz 2: UMPUT Forever)	Platform game for Mobile Phones.
2009	Штырлиц 4: Матрица — Шаг до гибели (Stierlitz 4 Matrix - Step To Death)	Adventure game.

== See also ==
- Hans Kloss (fictional character)
- James Bond

== Books and articles ==
- Jens, Erik (June 2017). "Cold War Spy Fiction in Russian Popular Culture: From Suspicion to Acceptance via Seventeen Moments of Spring". Studies in Intelligence. 61 (2): 37–47.
