= Nikolai Lebedev (actor) =

Soviet and Russian actor (1921–2022)

- Николай Лебедев
- Born: Nikolai Sergeyevich Lebedev; 15 December 1921; Moscow, Russian SFSR
- Died: 21 August 2022 (aged 100); Moscow, Russia
- Occupation: Actor
- Years active: 1940–2022
- Awards: People's Artist of Russia (2018)
- Military career
- Branch: Soviet Army
- Rank: Private
- Conflicts: World War II; Great Patriotic War; Battle of Uman

Nikolai Sergeyevich Lebedev (Russian: Николай Сергеевич Лебедев; 15 December 1921 – 21 August 2022) was a Soviet and Russian actor, People's Artist of Russia in 2018. A former soldier of the Red Army, he also fought in the Second World War, where he was captured by the Wehrmacht, during the Battle of Uman.

== Early life and career ==
Nikolai Sergeyevich Lebedev was born in Moscow on 15 December 1921. During the Great Patriotic War, he was drafted to the Red Army in April 1941, to fight as a private machine gunner. He was contused and captured by the Wehrmacht in July–August 1941, during the Battle of Uman. After his release by the enemy, he was tested by the Soviet counter-intelligence agency, SMERSH, and was ultimately cleared and let go. After the war, he acted at the Moscow Theater of the Young Spectator for two years until deciding to combine his studies and work, entering the Moscow Art Theatre School.

Lebedev graduated from the school in 1950, in the course of Viktor Stanitsyn. As it was known that he had been a prisoner during the war, Lebedev was banned from acting at the Moscow Art Theatre, despite both parties agreeing to it at first. Yuri Zavadsky introduced him to the Mossovet Theater instead, where Lebedev ultimately acted for more than 60 years.

== Personal life and death ==
Lebedev's wife, Anna Kasenkina, was also an actress. They lived together for more than half a century. Anna and Nikolai had no children together, although Kasenkina had a son from her first marriage, whom Lebedev raised as his own. After the death of Anna, he lived with his son's family.

Lebedev turned 100 in December 2021, and died on 21 August 2022.

== Selected filmography ==
- Normandie-Niemen (1959) as Colonel Sinitsyn
- Yevdokiya (1961) as Yevdokim
- Silence (1963) as episode
- Liberation (1971) as Sczyapan Krasoŭsky
- Eternal Call (1973) as Mitrofan Savelyev
- Earth and Sky Adventures (1974) as General Designer
- The Captivating Star of Happiness (1975)
- Air Crew (1980) as Professor of Medical Commission
- We Accuse (1985) as Dwight D. Eisenhower
- Vagrant Bus (1989) as episode
- King Lear (2006) as Doctor
