= Yulian Semyonov =

Russian writer

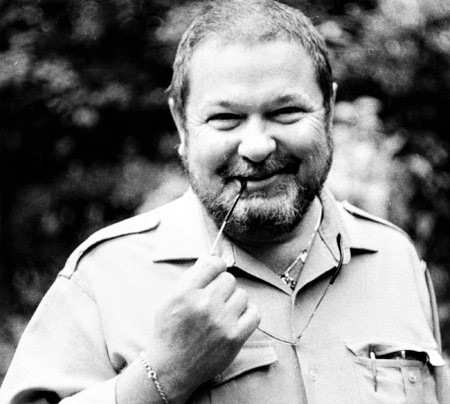
- Born: October 8, 1931; Moscow, Russian SFSR, Soviet Union
- Died: September 15, 1993 (aged 61); Moscow, Russia
- Occupation: novelist
- Writing career
- Genres: Detective fiction, spy fiction, historical novels, non-fiction
- Notable work: Seventeen Moments of Spring
- Website: semenov-foundation.org

Yulian Semyonovich Semyonov (Russian: Юлиа́н Семёнович Семёнов, Russian pronunciation: [jʉlʲɪˈan sʲɪˈmʲɵnəvʲɪtɕ sʲɪˈmʲɵnəf]), pen-name of Yulian Semyonovich Lyandres (Russian: Ля́ндрес) (October 8, 1931 – September 15, 1993), was a Soviet and Russian writer of spy fiction and detective fiction, also scriptwriter and poet. He is well known for creating the fictional spy Stierlitz.

== Early life ==
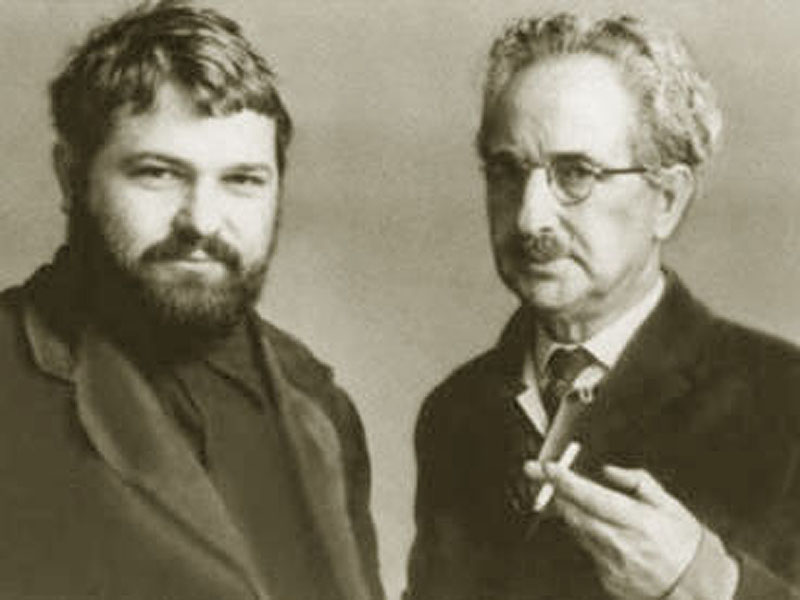
Yulian Semyonov (left) and his father, Semyon Alexandrovich Lyandres (date unknown)

Semyonov's father was Jewish, the editor of the newspaper "Izvestia", Semyon Alexandrovich Lyandres. His mother was Russian, Galina Nikolaevna Nozdrina, a history teacher.

In 1953 Semyonov graduated from the Moscow Institute of Oriental Studies Middle-East department. He then taught the Afghan language (Pashto) at Moscow State University and simultaneously studied there in the faculty of history.

== Career ==
After gaining an interpreter's degree at the university, Semyonov had diplomatic business in East Asian countries, continuing at the same time his scientific studies at Moscow State University (specializing in Persian history and politics).

Since 1955 he started to try his hand at journalism: he was published in key Soviet newspapers and magazines of that time: "Ogoniok", "Pravda", "Literaturnaya Gazeta", "Komsomolskaya Pravda", "Smena" etc.

In the 1960s–1970s Semyonov worked abroad a lot as a reporter of the said editions (in France, Spain, Germany, Cuba, Japan, the US, Latin America). His journalistic career was full of adventures, often dangerous ones – at one time he was in the taiga with tiger hunters, then at a polar station, and then at the Baikal-Amur Mainline construction and diamond pipe opening. He was constantly at the center of important political events of those years – in Afghanistan, Francoist Spain, Chile, Cuba, Paraguay, tracing Nazis who sought cover from punishment, and Sicilian mafia leaders; taking part in the combatant operations of the Vietnamese and Laotian partisans.

Semyonov was one of the pioneers of Investigative journalism in Soviet periodicals. In 1974 in Madrid he managed to interview a Nazi criminal, Hitler's favorite Otto Skorzeny, who had categorically refused to meet any journalist before. Then, being the "Literaturnaya Gazeta" newspaper correspondent in Germany, the writer succeeded in interviewing the reichsminister Albert Speer and one of the SS leaders Karl Wolff.

Semyonov founded and directed "the monthly magazine Sovershenno sekretno (Top Secret), the first fully independent, privately owned periodical in Soviet Russia since 1917".

His interviews, as well as his investigations regarding the searches for the Amber Room and other cultural treasures moved abroad from Russia during World War II, were published by Semyonov in his documentary story "Face to Face" in 1983.

=== Social activity ===
Being the most precious thing one can ever possess, freedom finding is accompanied by such resistance against the essence and movement of the perestroika, that there is nothing else left to do but to stare and amaze ... It seems as if the desire to be held again by the "hard hand" is brewing ... Autocracy, exalting "the great, the brilliant and the outstanding" causes a catastrophe. And we know it by our own experience.

— From interview with Shot Muladjanov, "Moskovskaya Pravda", 22 November 1989
- In 1986, Semyonov became the President of the International Association of Detective and Political Novel (Russian: МАДПР), which he himself initiated to create, and the editor-in-chief of the collected stories edition "Detective and Politics" (the edition was published by the said Association together with the Press Agency "Novosti" and played an important role in popularization of the detective genre in the USSR.)
- Semyonov's participation in searching for the famous Amber Room together with Georges Simenon, James Aldridge, baron von Falz-Fein and other famous members of the International Amber Room Searching Committee achieved wide renown.

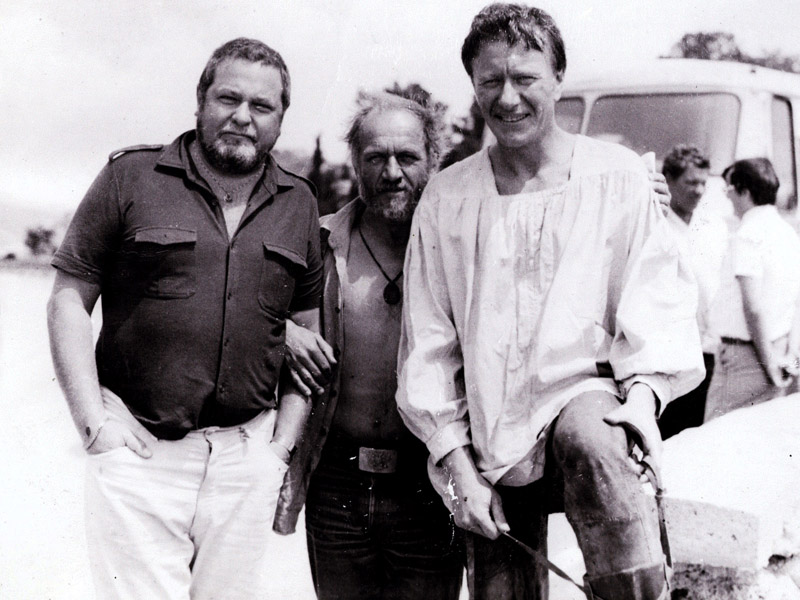
Yulian Semyonov and his friends, Andrei Mironov (right) and Lev Durov (Crimea, date unknown)

- Semyonov, together with Baron Eduard von Falz-Fein, a Russian aristocrat and first wave émigré, was engaged in searching for and returning the lost cultural treasures to Russia. The activity of the International Committee for Returning Russian Treasures to the Motherland established by Semyonov made it possible to return to Russia the Feodor Ivanovich Chaliapin's remains, the part of Lifar&Diaghilev's library, the unique tapestry from the Livadia Palace depicting the Royal Family and many other cultural values.
- With the beginning of the perestroika Semyonov got the chance to cover the pages of the Soviet history which used to be a forbidden subject before. In 1988 there appeared the essay collection "Closed History Pages" and "Unwritten Novels", the philippic narrative about the times and morals of Stalin's cult of personality based on the historical documents, eyewitnesses' accounts and the author's personal experience.
- In 1989 Semyonov founded the first private (i.e. uncontrolled by the government) Soviet edition – the "Top Secret" bulletin ("Sovershenno sekretno"), then becoming its editor-in-chief with the symbolic royalty of 1 rouble per year.
- In 1988 Yulian Semyonov, Vasily Livanov and Vitaly Solomin opened the experimental Moscow theatre "Detective". There were staged thrilling plays and children's performances. In 1992, Y.S. Semyonov being already seriously ill, the company was directed by Livanov and the unique theatre was closed due to the ownership conflict.

== Personal life ==
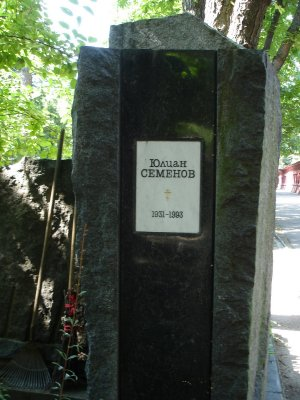
Semyonov' grave on the Novodevichy Cemetery

His wife Ekaterina Sergeevna was a step-daughter of Sergey Vladimirovich Mikhalkov (the wedding took place on 12 April 1955). Though their family life was quite complicated, Ekaterina Sergeevna devotedly kept looking after her husband after the stroke which happened to him in 1990. They had two daughters – Daria and Olga. The elder one, Daria, is an artist, and the younger, Olga Semyonova, is a journalist and a writer, an author of the autobiographical books about her father.

After the sudden stroke in 1990, Semyonov became bedridden and could not return to work ever again. Y.S. Semyonov died on 15 September 1993 in Moscow. He was buried in the Novodevichy Cemetery. The writer's disease and death are controversial, due to a possibility of him being assassinated.

According to investigative journalist Vladimir Solovyov, Semyonov was actually poisoned by the KGB to prevent him from publishing the materials about Moscow Patriarch Alexius's II and other Russian Orthodox Church officials' collaboration with the KGB. Soloviev referred to information provided by Artyom Borovik. The material (a video tape) was allegedly prepared by priest Alexander Men, who was killed by unknown assassins at the same time. The materials were published later by Gleb Yakunin, who was given access to KGB files as a member of the Lev Ponomaryov commission.

== Legacy ==
=== Tributes and honors ===
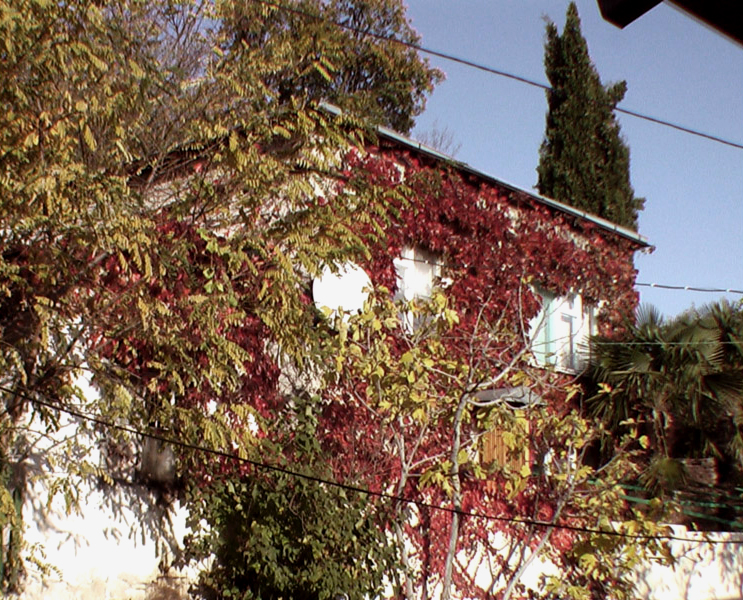
Semyonov' memorial museum house in Oliva

- In 2007 the writer's younger daughter Olga Yulianovna Semyonova opened her father's memorial museum house in the settlement Oliva (Crimea), where the writer lived and worked during his last years.
- In 2011 in honor of the 80th anniversary from the day of the writer's birth, the Semyonov Cultural Foundation and Union of Journalists of Moscow established the annual Yulian Semyonov Award in the field of critical geopolitical journalism.
- In 2012 a monument to Semyonov was mounted in Yalta (Crimea). The author of the monument is national sculptor of Russia Alexander Rukavishnikov.

=== Biography and criticism ===
- The Unknown Yulian Semyonov, a 2009 two-volume edition, composed and commented by the writer's daughter O.Y. Semyonova contains a vast material regarding Semyonov's life, works and social activity — his little known texts and notes about him.
  - Revelation — the volume contains Yulian Semyonov's works which were not published before or little known ones. The short stories "Baron", "Commentary on Skorzeny", Revelation, "Three Translations of Omar Cabezas with Commentary"; plays "Two Faces of Pierre-Auguste de Beaumarchais", "Children of fathers", "Process-38"; stories, articles, reviews. There were also the author's poems, published for the first time.
  - I will Die for a While — the volume includes the correspondence of Y. Semyonov with his father S. Lyandres and with his family; the letters of readers, friends and colleagues; articles about the writer's works, interviews, recollections of the writer (by E. Primakov, V. Livanov, N. Mikhalkov, L. Anninsky, A. Karmen, V. Kevorkov, etc.), and also the diaries of the 1960s with the travel notes.
- Vladimir Shlapentokh (1991). Soviet Intellectuals and Political Power: the Post-Stalin Era. I.B. Tauris. ISBN 978-1-85043-284-5.
- Birgit Beumers; Stephen C. Hutchings; Natalia Rulyova (2008). The Post-Soviet Russian Media: Conflicting Signals. Routledge. ISBN 978-0-415-67487-4.
- Montgomery Brower (1987). "In Yulian Semyonov's Thrillers the Villains Are Cia Types—and Some Say the Author Works for the Kgb". People.
- Theimer Nepomnyashchy, Catharine (2002). "The Blockbuster Miniseries on Soviet TV: Isaev-Stierliz, the Ambiguous Hero of Seventeen Moments in Spring" (PDF). The Soviet and Post-Soviet Review. 29. BRILL: 257–276. doi:10.1163/187633202X00044. ISSN 1075-1262.

== Filmography ==
During all his life Semyonov wrote screenplays for films, mainly for the ones after his own works. The writer's full filmography numbers more than 20 filmed works (Major Whirlwind (1967), Seventeen Moments of Spring (1973), Petrovka, 38 (1980), TASS Is Authorized to Declare... (1984), Confrontation (1985), ...), which continue to be hits of the Russian cinema.

Semyonov also directed the film Night at the 14th Parallel (1971) and acted in such films as Weekdays and Holidays (1961) and Solaris (1971, directed by Andrei Tarkovsky).

Year	Title	Role	Notes
1961	Budni i prazdniki		Episodic role
1972	Solaris	Predsedatel nauchnoy konferentsii	(final film role)

== Documentary filmography ==
- How Cult Figures Passed Away. Yulian Semyonov (directed by Mikhail Rogovoy, 2005)
- Yulian Semyonov. Pabulum for Reflection (directed by Alexander Pasechny, 2006)
- Yulian Semyonov. Agent of Influence (directed by Mikhail Kuzovenkov, 2006)
- Yulian Semyonov. Top Secret Information (directed by Alexey Alenin, 2007)
- Stories about the Father. Yulian Semyonov through the Eyes of his Daughter (directed and screenplay by Alevtina Tolkunova, 2011)
- He Knew Too Much... (directed by Konstantin Smilga, screenplay by Dmitry Likhanov, 2011)
- Unknown Yulian Semyonov (directed by Sergei Stafeev, 2011)
