= Vladimir Shlapentokh =

Soviet and American academic

- Владимир Эммануилович Шляпентох
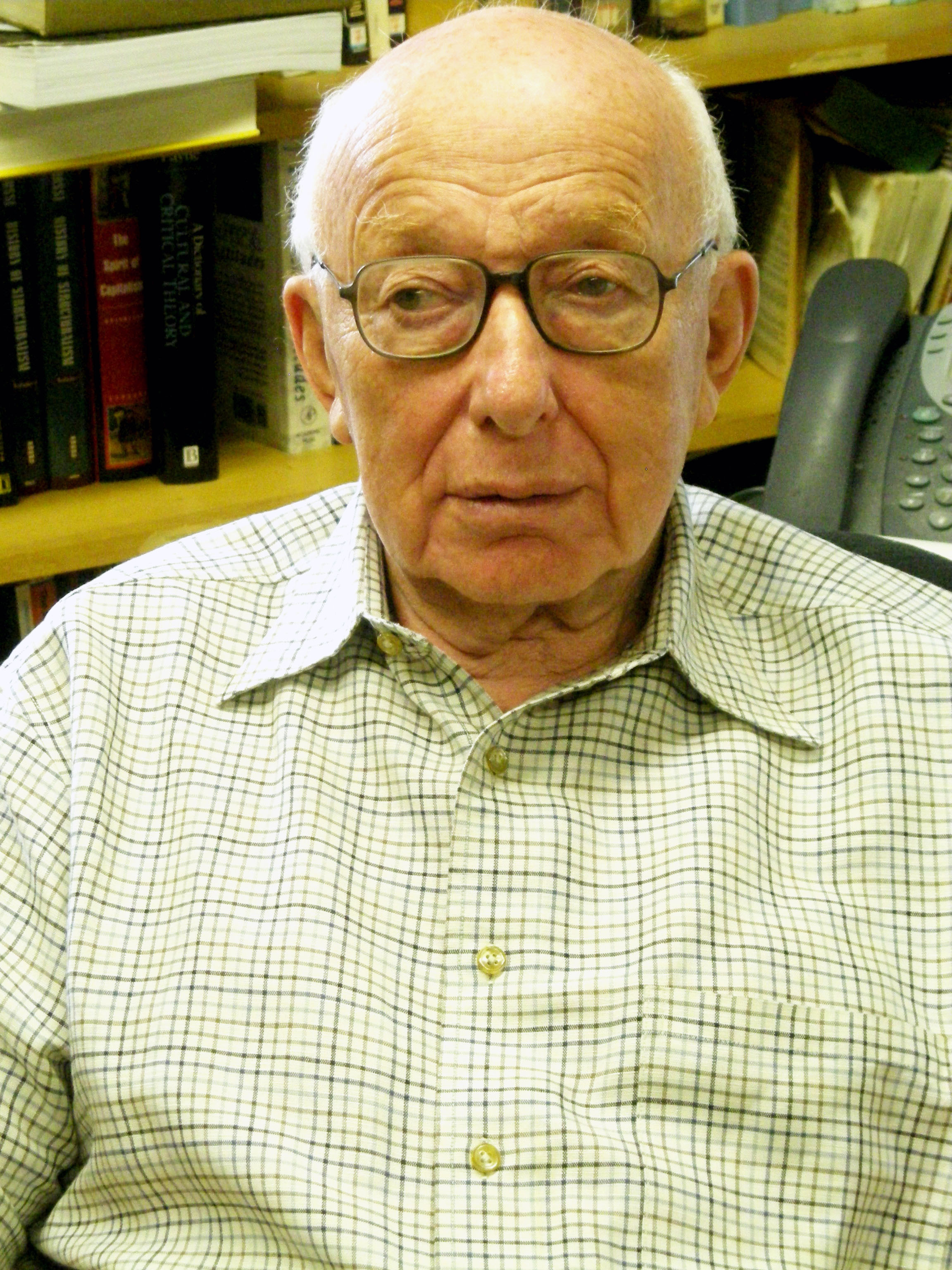
- Born: Vladimir Emmanuilovich Shlapentokh; 19 October 1926; Kyiv, Ukrainian SSR
- Died: 6 October 2015 (aged 88); East Lansing, Michigan, U.S.
- Education: Institute of World Economy and International Affairs, 1966; Moscow State University of Economics, Statistics, and Informatics, Ph.D. 1956; Economic Statistical Institute, B.A. 1950; Kyiv State University, B.A. 1949
- Scientific career
- Fields: sociology, political science
- Workplaces: Michigan State University; Senior Fellow, the Institute of Sociology, Moscow

Vladimir Emmanuilovich Shlapentokh (Russian: Влади́мир Эммануи́лович Шляпенто́х, Vladimir Èmmanuilovič Šlâpentoh; 19 October 1926 – 6 October 2015) was a Soviet and American sociologist, historian, political scientist, and university professor, notable for his work on Soviet and Russian society and politics as well as theoretical work in sociology.

He was a Professor of Sociology at Michigan State University (MSU). Vladimir Shlapentokh was widely considered a "founding father" (together with Vladimir Yadov, Boris Grushin, and Yuri Levada) of Soviet sociology.

== Biography ==
Vladimir Shlapentokh was born and educated in Kyiv in the former Soviet Union. Shlapentokh conducted the first set of national public opinion surveys in the Soviet Union, working as a Senior Fellow at the Institute of Sociology, Moscow. By the time he emigrated to the United States in 1979, he had published ten books, as well as several articles on the methodology of sociological studies and various social issues.

After moving to the United States, Vladimir Shlapentokh published more than 30 books and dozens of professional articles. He wrote columns appearing in the New York Times, the Washington Post, the Los Angeles Times, and the Christian Science Monitor.

From 1982, Vladimir Shlapentokh served as a consultant to the United States government, regularly reporting on social processes, ideology, and public opinion on post-communist states, including Russia. Vladimir Shlapentokh spoke English, German, French, Italian, Russian, Ukrainian, Polish, and other Slavic languages.

== Early career ==
Vladimir Shlapentokh began his career in social science as a Soviet sociologist and was one of the founders of a new science which had been forbidden in the USSR until the 1960s. In the 1960s and 1970s, until his emigration to the United States, he was the leading expert on methodology of sociological studies, publishing a number of the first Soviet books on sampling techniques, as well as on survey techniques. These publications served as textbooks for several generations of Russian social scientists. The first popular book on sociology in the USSR, Sociology for All (1970) was a best seller in the country and attracted many young people to the sociology profession.

== The segmented approach ==
As Vladimir Shlapentokh's major contribution to social science, his segmented approach theory to the study of society is paramount. The segmented approach breaks with the principles of "system analysis," as formulated in the 1950s-1960s which continues to be generally unchallenged in social science. Shlapentokh contends that it is impossible to explain society with the contribution of just one theoretical model which supposes that the whole society functions according to the principles of a single system. In Shlapentokh's view, most societies are segmented and exhibit a combination of different universal social structures which existed in the past and still exist today. Shlapentokh comes up against the erroneous use of the historical approach in social analysis which supposes the permanent appearance of new social structures and the disappearance of the old ones. The term "combinatorics" is for Shlapentokh a key concept for understanding why mankind, with only a few types of social organizations, has been able to create such vast social diversity over time and space.

The most important social structures include feudal, authoritarian, and liberal. Among other universal structures are religious, criminal, and anarchistic. The segmented character of society, with the coexistence and interaction of various social structures, demands the simultaneous use of multiple models of social organization (or Weberian "ideal types"). The concrete elements of society that do not fit a given model should not be seen merely as "deviations" from the system but rather as empirical evidence that more than one model is needed for the analysis. The specifics of each society are determined by the roles of social organizations and their interactions with each other.

Shlapentokh applies his segmented approach to the analysis of three societies: Soviet society, post-Soviet Russia and the United States. He was one of the first to study the processes of privatization during the post-Stalin era (see: Public and Private Life of the Soviet People 1989; Soviet Ideologies in the Period of Glasnost 1988). Among the private institutions of Soviet society, Shlapentokh paid special attention to friendship as somewhat of an antidote to the might of the Soviet state. In his book Love, Marriage, and Friendship in the Soviet Union (1984) as well as in his memoirs, An Autobiographical Narration of the Role of Fear and Friendship in the Soviet Union (2004), Shlapentokh showed how important friendship was to the everyday life of the Soviet people due to the affordances that it offered through its social network and social capital.

In a book written in collaboration with historian Mikhail Loiberg and economist Roman Levita, The Province Versus the Center in Russia: From Submission to Rebellion (1997), Shlapentokh analyzes the evolution of the feudal structure in Soviet society during the civil war and the Perestroika era when feudal tendencies were particularly strong. In his book, Contemporary Russia as a Feudal Society: A New Perspective on the Post-Soviet Era (2007), in addition to several articles first published in 1995, Shlapentokh describes three major sectors of post-Soviet Russia: liberal, authoritarian, and feudal, paying special attention to the role of the feudal segment as well to the role of the liberal sector. As he demonstrates in numerous publications on Putin's regime, the significant role of private property in post-Soviet authoritarian society makes Russia's transformation into a totalitarian regime impossible. In his other publications, Shlapentokh, with contributions from Woods, demonstrates how all three major sector models are necessary for the study of many developments in American society, such as the relations between corporations and the government, the impact of money on the election process, private security, and the impact of personal relations on politics, among others.

== The nature of totalitarian society ==
The authoritarian society has become the heart of Shlapentokh's research and writing. In his foremost book on the nature of totalitarianism, A Normal Totalitarian Society (2001), he endeavors to convey his vision of the Soviet Union's evolution from its origin to its end. In this book, Shlapentokh rejects the views of two warring camps in Sovietology: the faction that views the Soviet system only as a regime, which was imposed on the Russians by a band of ideological fanatics and adventurists, and the opposing group, or the revisionist camp, which tended to perceive the USSR as a type of pluralistic society that had ample participation from the masses within the government.

Instead, Shlapentokh regards the Soviet Union as a quite efficient "normal" totalitarian society with the state as its central institution. The Communist party, the main instrument of the state, through its network, was an efficient coordinator of activities pertaining to all branches of organizations throughout the country, and was able to quickly mobilize resources for military objectives. In fact, the Soviet Union was able to run all elements of society, which was particularly important in allowing Soviet society to reproduce itself. Shlapentokh denies the inevitability of the Soviet collapse in the early 1990s, and believes that if Gorbachev had not launched his ill- conceived reforms, the USSR, which was not endangered unlike tsarist Russia by foreign countries, could have continued to function for many years.

At the same time, speaking about his disgust of the Orwellian fear present in a totalitarian society, Shlapentokh suggested in his book Fear in Contemporary Society: Its Negative and Positive Effects (2006) the usefulness of Hobbesian fear for the maintenance of order even in such a democratic society as the United States. In his opinion, "positive socialization" and the internalization of positive values is simply not enough to sustain order in Western societies. Without the fear of sanctions, people would violate the law and disturb social order much more often than in a society where order is sustained only by internalized values, a view dominant in American sociology since Talcott Parsons.

== Ideology and public opinion in interaction ==
Public opinion and ideology in authoritarian and democratic society is of special interest for Shlapentokh. Contrary to many contemporary American social scientists who do not use the term "ideology," but have rather replaced it due to the influence of postmodernists with the vague term "narration," Shlapentokh is inclined to see ideology, which is a set of values and beliefs, as a very powerful social factor which influences almost all types of social activity, particularly the opinions of people.

Shlapentokh differentiates between public (open) ideology and the closed (internal or "party") ideology of the elites themselves. He shows, for instance, in his book Soviet Public Opinion and Ideology: The Interaction Between Mythology and Pragmatism (1986), that the "internal ideology," or the ideology of the Soviet ruling elite, strongly differs from public ideology, which is comparable to how the oligarchic ideology of the corporate class is different from public ideology in the United States. The existence of two types of ideologies explains why in most societies there are two channels of information, one for the public and one for "the inner circle." Shlapentokh considers the Soviet public and party ideologies as complex and relatively flexible structures with distinct trends flowing through them, which consequently explains why, with each new leader, ideologies have tended to change substantially (see: Soviet Ideologies in the Period of Glasnost 1988).

Shlapentokh also discusses another mechanism of adaptation to the dominant ideology which he labels as "'values for me and values for others," which was initially published in the article "The Study of Values as a Social Phenomenon: the Soviet Case" (Social Forces 1982). In this theory, Shlapentokh claims that many people in various societies, which seemingly subscribe to the strong beliefs of the dominant ideology, actually expect others, but not themselves, to behave according to them. It can be contended that official values are regarded by many people as "gala values," as values not for them personally, but as values for others. These people also expect others, but not themselves, to be consistent in their views.

In studying the interaction between ideology and public opinion, Shlapentokh joined, in the early 1970s, phenomenologists Berger and Luckman who focused on the concept of "multiple realities," which supposes that people hold very different images of the same "objective reality." Later on, Shlapentokh analyzed the images of insiders as outsiders in his book, The Soviet Union: Internal and External Perspectives on Soviet Society (2008) written with coauthor Eric Shiraev. Among the insiders, special attention was paid to the ruling elite, the liberal intellectuals, and the average person. The outsiders included the Sovietologists, American media and American public opinion whose models of the Soviet society were in deep contradiction with each other. By all accounts, Shlapentokh with Shiraev made the first attempt in social science to show in a systematic way, with the use of available empirical data, how the same society, its political, economic, and social structures, as well as its culture and history, was perceived so differently by its residents and by foreigners. Shlapentokh rejects relativism in the social sciences, and operates under the concept of "hard reality," which is defined as a reality that can only be delineated by existing objective empirical data. .

In the comparison of different models, or perceptions, of the same society, Shlapentokh supposes that those perceptions which are more critical of the actual society are closer to "hard reality" than the apologetic images of the society. Of course, we should dismiss critical views inspired by the blind hatred of society or those that are based solely in conspiracy, as these views are marred by a distorted view of reality and thus do very little for the true analysis of society.

== Fear in society ==
Shlapentokh pays special attention to the actual repression in the Soviet system as well as to the fear of potential repression. He suggests that fear of the authorities, party bosses, and political police, was a major underlying reason for the endurance of the Soviet system.

Paying the utmost attention to fear in authoritarian and, in particular, totalitarian societies, Shlapentokh organized three conferences dedicated to terror in the Soviet Union and in other repressive regimes. The first of his conference series, entitled "1984," was devoted to Orwell and took place at Michigan State University, appropriately enough in 1984. In Shlapentokh's opinion, being as an outsider, Orwell better understood the essence of Soviet society than many critical analysts inside the country. He insisted that the numerous authors who discussed Orwell ignored or underestimated the contribution that Orwell's 1984 had to the social sciences, such as the discovery of an efficient mechanism that allows people to adapt to any hierarchical organization, from a department at an American University to the Soviet totalitarian society. He also asserts that only "the love of Big Brother" guarantees the individual perfect conformity, which is discussed in Shlapentokh's essay "George Orwell: Russia's Tocqueville," published in a book of compiled scholarly essays on Orwell, George Orwell into the Twentieth Century (2004).

At the same time, speaking about his disgust of the Orwellian fear present in a totalitarian society, Shlapentokh suggested in his book Fear in Contemporary Society: Its Negative and Positive Effects (2006) the usefulness of Hobbesian fear for the maintenance of order even in such a democratic society as the United States. In his opinion, "positive socialization" and the internalization of positive values is simply not enough to sustain order in Western societies. Without the fear of sanctions, people would violate the law and disturb social order much more often than in a society where order is sustained only by internalized values, a view dominant in American sociology since Talcott Parsons.

== The role of elites ==
Shlapentokh links the significant role of ideology in society to the role of the elites, particularly the political elites. For Shlapentokh, it is the elites, not the masses, which are the creators and the modifiers of ideology. The ruling political elite impose the values and norms of the dominant ideology on the population, which they are able to do by using their monopoly on media, education, and culture, as well as by means of coercion.

While attributing a rather passive role to the masses in ideological processes, Shlapentokh at the same time acknowledges that those cultural traditions and internalized feelings and beliefs held by the masses are important, as they are used by the elite for shaping and changing the ideological xenophobia and desire for justice. For example, the Russian Bolsheviks flawlessly exploited hatred of social inequality, while Stalin and Putin were able to exploit xenophobia with the same success. For Shlapentokh, the distinction between the elites and the masses plays a leading role in the analysis of describing any society to date, from Soviet to post-Soviet Russia, to American society. In his opinion, the many problems of post-Soviet Russia, beginning with the failure of democratization, should not be ascribed to the masses but to the new elites, which, having attained the means for personal enrichment, have in turn supported the authoritarian system so as to guarantee the stability of their own newly acquired wealth and status.

In his study of anti-Americanism in Russia and in other countries, Shlapentokh insisted that it was the elite and not ordinary people who inspired anti-Americanism, and that the anti-American sentiment of ordinary people was usually a product of the media which was controlled by the elites (see: The New Elite In Post-Communist Eastern Europe 1999. Edited by Shlapentokh et al.; "Moscow's Values: Masses and the Elite," in Nation Building and Common Values in Russia 2003; "Russian Civil Society: Elite Versus Mass Attitudes Toward Democratization" in Democratization, Comparisons, Confrontations and Contrasts 2008).

== Empirical Sociology ==
Shlapentokh was the director of the first national surveys based on random samplings in the 1960s and 1970s, which were the first national scientific surveys in the history of the Soviet Union. The results of these surveys were included in numerous Russian publications, and were also translated into English. He furthermore employed his experience as an empirical sociologist in dozens of studies in the Soviet Union, as well as, much later, for the international project regarding world attitudes towards America in the aftermath of September 11 (see: America: Sovereign Defender or Cowboy Nation? Edited by Shlapentokh together with Woods and Shiraev, 2005).

The major mark of totalitarian society, the role of fear and ideology, makes clear why Shlapentokh made the focus in his methodological studies the empirical validity of sociological data. This issue had largely escaped the attention of American sociologists who overestimated the impact of the freedom of expression on the readiness of their respondents to be sincere in their surveys. Shlapentokh and several of his colleagues were sure that respondents in any society, but particularly those in authoritarian societies, were influenced by "desirable values," the desire of people to answer questions in accordance with the ideology dominant in their milieu.

No other expert on surveys in the United States has paid as much attention to the veracity of respondents as Shlapentokh has, developing his theories on this issue in two books published in Russian (see: The Empirical Validity of the Statistical Information in Sociological Studies 1973; The Quality of Sociological Information: Validity, Representativeness and Prognostic Potential 2006). Because of his belief in the strong impact that ideology and media had on respondents in sociological studies and polls, Shlapentokh was one of the first in contemporary polling practices, along with fellow sociologist Boris Grushin, to develop the technique of using many different procedures which helped in comparing data from various sources of information, in order to find the most reliable data.

== Books written ==
- Shlapentokh, Vladimir (1958). Критика современного мальтузианства [Criticism of modern Malthusianism] (in Russian). Moscow: Publishing House of Moscow State University.
- Shlapentokh, Vladimir (1965). Некоторые проблемы политической экономии [Some problems of political economy] (in Russian). Novosibirsk: Novosibirsk State University.
- Shlapentokh, Vladimir (1966). Эконометрика и проблемы экономического роста: макромоделирование в работах буржуазных экономистов [Econometrics and problems of economic growth: macromodelling in bourgeois economists' works] (in Russian). Moscow: Mysl.
- Shlapentokh, Vladimir (1970). Социология для всех [Sociology for all] (in Russian). Moscow: Sovetskaya Rossiya.
- Shlapentokh, Vladimir (1973). Как сегодня изучают завтра: Современные методы социального прогнозирования [How tomorrow is studied today: modern methods of social forecasting] (in Russian). Moscow: Soviet Russia.
- Shlapentokh, Vladimir (1976). Проблемы репрезентативности социологической информации: случайная и неслучайная выборки в социологии [Problems of representativeness sociological information: random and non-random sampling in sociology] (in Russian). Moscow: Statistika.
- Shlapentokh, Vladimir (1984). Love, marriage, and friendship in the Soviet Union: ideals and practices. New York: Praeger. ISBN 0030715415.
- Shlapentokh, Vladimir (1986). Soviet public opinion and ideology: mythology and pragmatism in interaction. New York: Praeger. ISBN 0275925617.
- Shlapentokh, Vladimir (1987). Soviet public opinion and ideology: mythology and pragmatism in interaction. Boulder: Westview Press. ISBN 0813372593.
- Shlapentokh, Vladimir (1989). Public and private life of the Soviet people: changing values in post-Stalin Russia. New York: Oxford University Press. ISBN 0195042662.
- Shlapentokh, Vladimir (1990). Soviet intellectuals and political power: the post-Stalin era. Princeton: Princeton University Press. ISBN 0691094594.
- Shlapentokh, Vladimir (1990). Открывая Америку: Письма друзьям в Москву [Discovering America: letters to friends in Moscow] (in Russian). St. Petersburg: The Hermitage. ISBN 1557790132.
- Shlapentokh, Vladimir (2001). A normal totalitarian society: how the Soviet Union functioned and how it collapsed. Armonk, New York: M.E. Sharpe. ISBN 1563244713.
- Shlapentokh, Vladimir (2003). Страх и дружба в нашем тоталитарном прошлом [Fear and friendship in our totalitarian past] (in Russian). Tenafly: Publishing House of Zvezda magazine. ISBN 5942140480.
- Shlapentokh, Vladimir (2004). An autobiographical narration of the role of fear and friendship in the Soviet Union. Lewiston, New York: Edwin Mellen Press. ISBN 0773462945.
- Shlapentokh, Vladimir (2006). Fear in contemporary society: its negative and positive effects. New York: Palgrave Macmillan. ISBN 140397389X.
- Shlapentokh, Vladimir (2006). Проблемы качества социологической информации: достоверность, репрезентативность, прогностический потенциал [Problems of quality of sociological information: reliability, representativeness, prognostic potential] (in Russian). Moscow: ЦСП. ISBN 5982010138.
- Shlapentokh, Vladimir (2007). Contemporary Russia as a feudal society: a new perspective on the post-Soviet era. New York: Palgrave Macmillan. ISBN 978-0230600966.
- Shlapentokh, Vladimir (2008). Современная Россия как феодальное общество. Новый ракурс постсоветской эры [Contemporary Russia as a feudal society: a new perspective on the post-Soviet era] (in Russian). Moscow: Stolitsa-Print. ISBN 978-5981321375.

== Institutions ==
- Professor, Michigan State University
- Senior Fellow, the Institute of Sociology, Moscow (until 1979)
