= Tofig Mirzoyev =

Azerbaijani actor (1932–2026)

- Tofiq Mirzəyev
- Born: Tofig Ibrahim oglu Mirzayev; June 16, 1932; Baku, Azerbaijan SSR, Transcaucasian SFSR, USSR
- Died: July 21, 2026 (aged 94); Beersheba, Southern District, Israel
- Education: Azerbaijan State University of Culture and Arts
- Occupation: Actor
- Years active: 1956–2016
- Father: Ibrahim Mirzoyev

Tofig Ibrahim oglu Mirzoyev (Azerbaijani: Tofiq İbrahim oğlu Mirzəyev; June 16, 1932 – July 21, 2026) was an Azerbaijani actor, film director and musician.

== Life and career ==
Tofig Ibrahim oglu Mirzoyev was born in Baku on June 16, 1932. He was the son of Ibrahim Mirzoyev, an actor, and his wife, Bella Ilyinshina. His mother had a Jewish origin. Mirzoyev had two siblings, Teymur Mirzoyev, a famous musician, and Leya Mirzoyev.

During World War II, Ibrahim Mirzoyev fought at the front. During the war, his mother, brother, and sister Leya moved to Gadabay at the insistence of their relatives, stayed there until the end of the war, and then returned to Baku. He graduated from the clarinet class of the National Conservatory of Azerbaijan. First in Baku, then in Moscow. Niyazi, an Azerbaijani conductor and composer, saw him as a clarinetist and invited him to the State Symphony Orchestra, and under the leadership of the maestro, Tofig began to perform Azerbaijani and world symphonic music as part of the orchestra. But Tofig was interested in jazz as well as classical music from a very young age. He was not content with just being interested, but performed jazz music with such famous Azerbaijani jazzmen as Parviz Rustambeyov, Vagif Mustafazadeh and Tofig Shabanov. However, a sudden illness made him quit his music career.

Mirzoyev changed his career and went to Moscow to study to become a director. After completing the courses, he acquired the profession of director. Then, he got a job at AzTV, where he worked for 25 years. At that time, Arif Babayev, the chief director of AzTV, helped him in his first steps on television and then in cinema. The films shot with his participation are included in the golden fund of Azerbaijani Cinematography.In the 1990s, Tofik moved to Israel. He was a member of the Haifa-Baku society.

Mirzoyev died in Beersheba on July 21, 2026, at the age of 94.
