= Tatyana Lioznova =

Soviet film director and screenwriter (1924–2011)

- Татьяна Лиознова
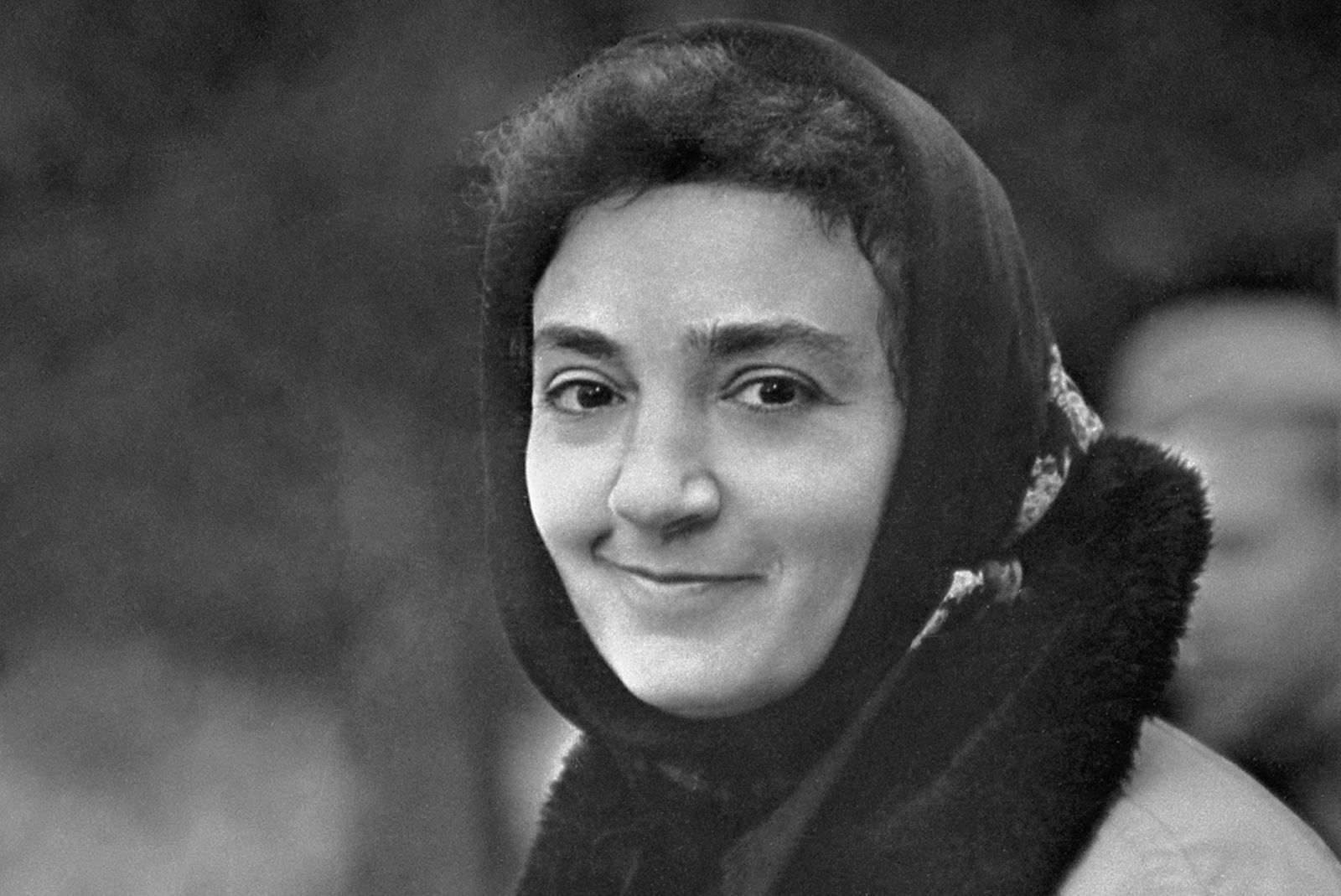
- Born: Tatyana Moiseyevna Lioznova; 20 July 1924; Moscow, Soviet Union
- Died: 29 September 2011 (aged 87); Moscow, Russia
- Resting place: Donskoye Cemetery
- Occupations: Film director, screenwriter
- Years active: 1948–1986
- Awards: People's Artist of the USSR

Tatyana Mikhailovna Lioznova (Russian: Татьяна Михайловна Лиознова; 20 July 1924 – 29 September 2011) was a Soviet film director and screenwriter best known for her TV series Seventeen Moments of Spring (1973).

== Personal life ==
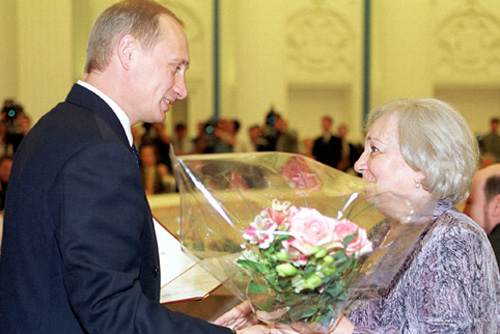
Lioznova and Vladimir Putin in 2000

Tatyana Lioznova was born in Moscow to parents Moses Alexandrovich (Russian: Моисей Александрович) and Ida Israilevna (Russian: Ида Израилевна). Her father worked as an economic engineer, but died in the early years of WWII, known in Russia as the Great Patriotic War. She was raised by her mother, who had a limited education, but worked hard to provide for her daughter.

Lioznova never had children of her own, but had an adopted daughter, Lyudmila Lisina.

In 2011, Lioznova died in Moscow, and is buried next to her mother in Moscow's Donskoye Cemetery.

== Education and early work ==
Lioznova spent one semester at the Moscow Aviation Institute during the war, but ultimately decided on a different career path, and in 1943 began attending the Russian State University of Cinematography, the world's oldest film school, now known as the Gerasimov Institute of Cinematography. Lioznova was lucky enough to get into a workshop led by famed director Sergei Gerasimov and his wife, Soviet actress Tamara Makarova.

Following her graduation, Lioznova struggled to find work in the world of cinematography, and worked on custom sewing projects with her mother. She was able to find a job working as a handyman at a film studio, and worked in any position she was able to.

Her former mentor, Sergei Gerasimov, hired her as an assistant on several projects, and Lioznova spent eight years assisting other directors in their work before her own breakthrough.

== Film career ==
Lioznova's breakthrough came in 1958, with the debut of her first film, Memory of the Heart.

All of Lioznova's features – from Three Poplars in Plyushchikha (1968), a cult film of the 1960s, to her last movie, Carnival (1981), – are distinguished by open narratives, psychologically penetrating close-ups, and poignant musical scores.

The drama Three Poplars in Plyushchikha (1968) sprouted from Aleksandra Pakhmutova’s song “Tenderness”. It told the story of a nearly sprung love of a taxi driver and a married peasant woman.

In 1971, Lioznova began work on a television series entitled Seventeen Moments of Spring (Russian: Семнадцать мгновений весны), which aired in 1973 and became one of the most successful Soviet spy thrillers ever made. The twelve-part series gathered a cult following and won several state awards.

Lioznova's final film, released in 1986, The End of the World, followed by a symposium (Russian: Конец света с последующим симпозиумом), was an adaptation of a play by American writer, Arthur Kopit, for which Lioznova wrote the original script.

She became People's Artist of the USSR in 1984.

After the collapse of the Soviet Union in 1991, Lioznova did not shoot any more films.

Lioznova devoted her time to teaching. Among the students of Professor Lioznova there are a lot of cinematographers well-known today.

== Political activity ==
Lioznova was Jewish and was a member of the Anti-Zionist Committee of the Soviet Public from 1983 to the closing of Committee in 1992.

== Tribute ==
On 20 July 2020, Google celebrated her 96th birthday with a Google Doodle.

A plaque on the facade of the Gorky Film Studio building was dedicated to Lioznova in 2016 as a memorial to the director and the forty years she spent working for the studio.

== Filmography ==
- Memory of the Heart (1958)
- Yevdokiya (1961)
- They Conquer the Skies (1963)
- At Early Morning (1965)
- Three Poplars in Plyushchikha (1967)
- Seventeen Moments of Spring (1973); TV mini-series
- We, the Undersigned (1981)
- Carnival (1981)
- End of the World with Symposium to Follow (1986)

== Honours and awards ==
- Order "For Merit to the Fatherland";
  - 3rd class (20 July 1999) – for outstanding contribution to cinema
  - 4th class (20 July 2009) – for outstanding contribution to the development of the domestic art of film and many years of creative activity
- Order of Honour (9 March 1996) – for services to the state, many years of fruitful work in the arts and culture
- Order of the Red Banner of Labour (1969)
- Order of Friendship of Peoples
- Order of the October Revolution (1982)
- People's Artist of the USSR (1984)
- People's Artist of the RSFSR (1974)
- Honored Art Worker of the RSFSR (1969)
- Special Prize of the President of the Russian Federation "For outstanding contribution to the development of Russian cinema" (12 June 2000)
- Vasilyev Brothers State Prize of the RSFSR (1976) – a multi-part television film "Seventeen Moments of Spring"
