= Semyon Tsvigun =

Soviet officer of government securities

- Семён Цвигун
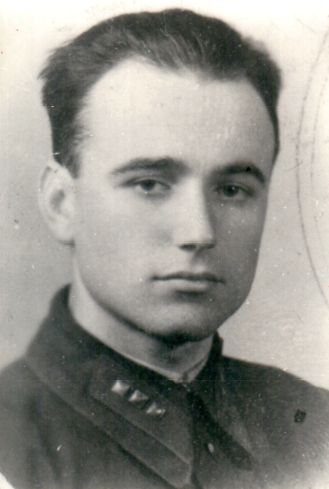
- Born: 28 September 1917; Stratievka, Ukrainian Soviet Socialist Republic, Soviet Union
- Died: 19 January 1982 (aged 64); Moscow, Russia
- Alma mater: K. D. Ushinsky South Ukrainian National Pedagogical University
- Military career
- Allegiance: Soviet Union
- Branch: Red Army NKVD; KGB
- Rank: Army General
- Conflicts: World War II

Semyon Kuzmich Tsvigun (Ukrainian: Семен Кузьмич Цвігун; Russian: Семён Кузьмич Цвигун; 28 September 1917 – 19 January 1982) was a Ukrainian Soviet officer of the KGB with important ties to Leonid Brezhnev. His sudden death (reportedly a suicide) heralded a major shift in Kremlin power politics.

== Career ==
Semyon Tsvigun was born into a large family of Ukrainian peasants, in Stratievka village, in the Chechelnyk District of Odesa Governorate, located near the Vinnytsia region of Ukraine. After graduating, he worked as a history teacher in the region of west Ukraine then designated as the Moldavian Autonomous Region. In November 1939, he was recruited to the NKVD. This was at a time when Joseph Stalin and the new chief of police, Lavrentiy Beria were preparing to seize the former Russian-ruled province of Bessarabia from Romania, to create the Moldavian Soviet Socialist Republic, now (Moldova). He escaped from Moldova after the German invasion in June 1941, and, according to his autobiography, he was sent into Odessa by boat when it was under siege, and remained in the city during the German occupation, hiding out in catacombs until he was ordered to break out, after which he joined partisans behind enemy lines in Smolensk. In 1943, he worked for SMERSH.

Tsvigun is credited with three screenplays, published in 1981 in a single volume entitled 'Retribution', about partisans operating behind Nazi lines, and three novels on similar themes published in 1973–82. However, Tsvigun's former colleague, Filipp Bobkov claimed, after Tsvigun's death, that he faked his war record, and he was never near the front line, a claim angrily disputed by Tsvigun's family. Zhores Medvedev also claims that Tsvigun's published fiction was all ghostwritten. Vladimir Kuzichkin said that Ivan Anisimovich Fadeikin, then KGB Chief of Karlshorst, East Berlin and liaison to the East German Stasi, openly said out loud during a drunken party about being Tsvigun's superior during WWII and spoke unflatteringly about his military and intellectual capabilities. Yuri Andropov found out about this and cancelled Fadeikin's pending appointment to the head of the KGB's Foreign Intelligence Service.

Tsvigun returned to the Moldovan SSR in 1946, and by 1951 had risen to the post of Deputy Head of the MGB (from 1954, the KGB) in Moldavia. Crucially for his future career, Leonid Brezhnev was head of the Moldovan communist party in 1950–52. Through this connection, he became an important member of the so-called Dnipropetrovsk Mafia, who were the core of Brezhnev's political support during his time as General Secretary of the Communist Party of the Soviet Union.

From August 1955, Tsvigun was deputy chairman, and from April 1957, chairman, of the KGB of the Tajik Soviet Socialist Republic. In September 1963–May 1967, he was Chairman of the KGB of the Azerbaijan Soviet Socialist Republic, where his deputy was Heydar Aliyev, later the post-communist leader of Azerbaijan.

In May 1967, Tsvigun was transferred to Moscow as First Deputy Chairman of the KGB, making him the highest-ranking career KGB officer in the country, because the chairman, Yuri Andropov, was a long-serving party official. Tsvigun was made head of the newly created Fifth Directorate, which was responsible for domestic security. It was his department which dealt with dissidents, such as Aleksandr Solzhenitsyn, Andrei Sakharov, etc. He was notoriously hard line. In September 1981, he wrote an article in the magazine Kommunist about his department's success in dealing with dissidents, whom he described as criminals.

=== Ties to Brezhnev ===
According to Moshe Lewin, Tsvigun had been "planted" by Brezhnev to spy and report on Yuri Andropov when he (Tsvigun) served as the latter's first deputy. After the deaths of Tsvigun and Suslov, Andropov started digging into the corruption-related files that had been in Tsvigun's hands and which Suslov forbade him to show to anyone. Andropov had already been aware that Brezhnev and his family were personally implicated in corruption schemes. Lewin states that the files revealed to Andropov that Tsvigun himself was also involved in corrupt transactions.

== Family ==
Tsvigun's wife, Rosa Mikhailovna, was a writer. Her collection of stories The Thunderstorm Gone were published in 1979 under her maiden name, R. Yermoleva. According to the dissident Zhores Medvedev, she was "notorious for demand to have 'first selection' of the books at international book fairs in Moscow. These books are usually bought by the state at a great discount, but Tsvigun's wife had no intention of paying for them, and pretended that her husband needed them for professional reasons." Medvedev believed that she was Brezhnev's wife's sister, but there is no mention of this alleged kinship in the extensive archives posted online by the Tsviguns' granddaughter Violetta Nichkova. Brezhnev's niece, Lyubov Brezhneva, claimed that Tsvigun was actually married to a cousin of Brezhnev's wife.

== Death ==
Semyon Tsvigun died on 19 January 1982. Six days later, on 25 January, Mikhail Suslov, who was next in seniority after Brezhnev within the apparatus of the Communist Party, also died. Andropov then quit the chairmanship of the KGB to take over Suslov's former position in the party secretariat, putting him clearly in line to succeed Brezhnev, who died ten months later.

The most generally accepted view is that Tsvigun committed suicide, although the reasons for this suicide are not certain. However, some have speculated it to be an assassination. In all versions, Tsvigun died from a bullet wound.

After Suslov's death, a story circulated that the latter had had a heart attack brought on by a confrontation with General Tsvigun over a corruption scandal involving diamond smuggling, in which Brezhnev's daughter Galina, her husband, General Yuri Churbanov, a deputy minister for internal affairs, the head of the Moscow circus, Anatoli Kolevatov, and a former circus artist named Boris 'the Gypsy' Buryata, were implicated. Andropov reputedly presented Suslov, the party official overseeing the KGB, with evidence of their guilt. Suslov reputedly summoned Tsvigun, accused him of protecting the criminals because of his link to the Brezhnev family, and warned him that he was likely to be expelled from the party and put on trial. The next day, Tsvigun committed suicide. This story of suicide after a quarrel with Suslov widely circulated among the leadership.

This version was contradicted by a subsequent chairman of the KGB, Vladimir Kryuchkov, who said that Tsvigun committed suicide because he was ill from cancer, and had had a lung removed.

A third version of the story is that Tsvigun was assassinated. The political scientist R. Judson Mitchell claimed that it was "rather likely that Tsvigun was eliminated by a hit squad in a KGB 'wet job'. Had Tsvigun been alive when Andropov quit, he would have been well placed to take over the chairmanship of the KGB, as its most senior career officer. Instead, Andropov appointed a successor, Vitaly Fedorchuk, who was not linked to the Dnipropetrovsk Mafia.
