= Hans Graf (pianist) =

Austrian pianist and professor of piano

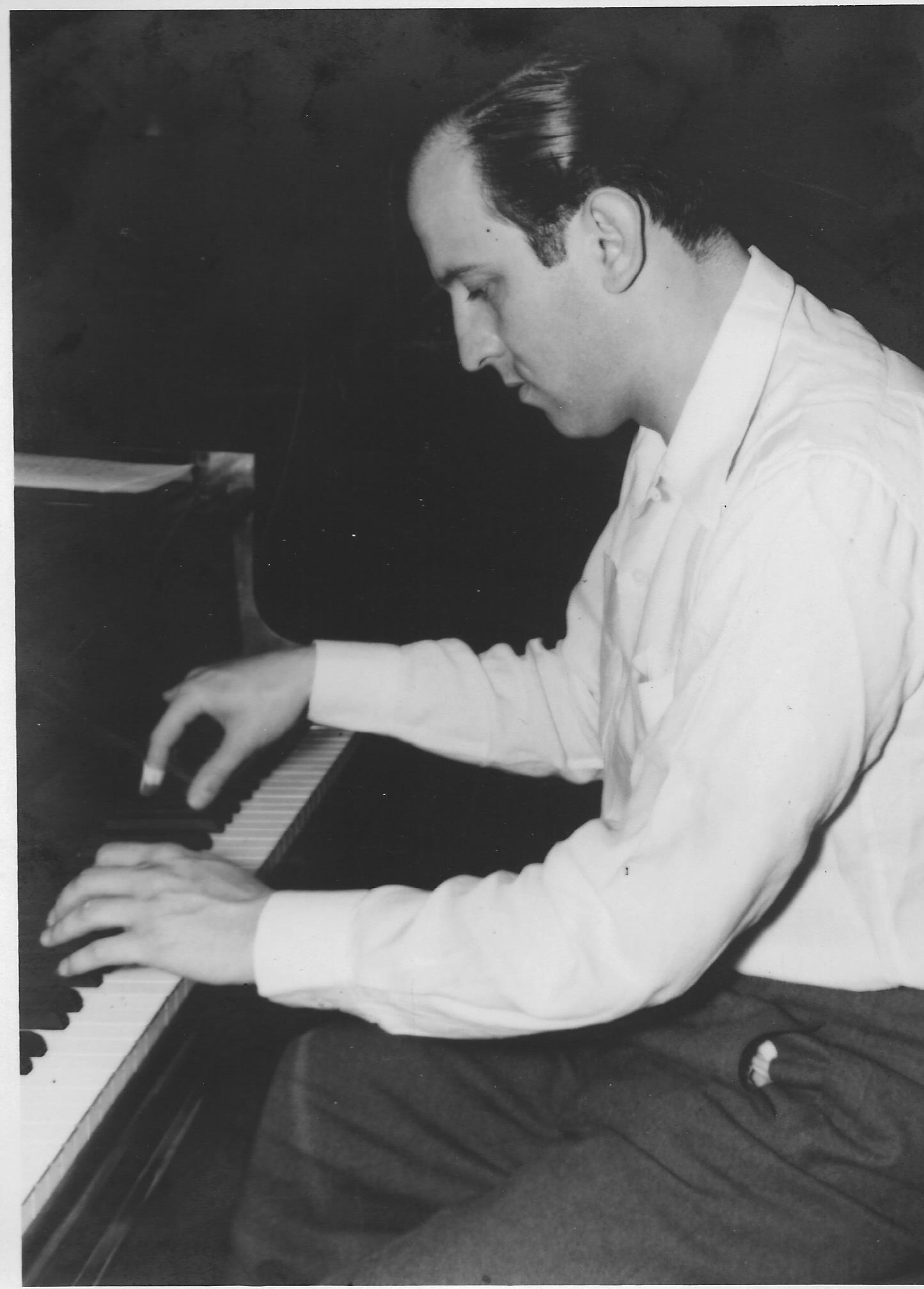
- The pianist in his thirties
- Born: 16 March 1928; Vienna, Austria
- Died: 9 January 1994 (aged 65); Vienna, Austria
- Occupations: Classical pianist; piano teacher
- Organization: University of Music and Performing Arts, Vienna
- Website: www.hans-und-carmen-graf.com

Hans Graf (16 March 1928 – 9 January 1994) was an Austrian pianist and professor of piano.

== Life ==
Graf was born and grew up in Vienna as a son of police lawyer Josef Graf (1895–1966), wirklicher Hofrat (an honorary title conferred on senior civil servants), and the former governess Rosa (née Kramreiter; 1885–1959). He received piano and violin instruction already as a child. In the final phase of World War II, Graf was drafted as a high school student to serve in an anti-aircraft defense unit where he served in Langenzersdorf as well as in the 6th district of Vienna (Esterházypark). He passed his high school graduation exam in 1946 and began to study architecture at the Vienna University of Technology. As a trumpeter, he became a member of the „Technische Tanz-Band“(Technical Dance Band, TTB), the dance orchestra of the University of Technology, as an extracurricular activity. In 1947, he passed the entrance exam in piano at what was known at the time as the Vienna Academy of Music and is known today as the University of Music and Performing Arts Vienna, where he became a student of Bruno Seidlhofer. Subsequently, Graf terminated his study of architecture in order to devote himself entirely to music. Aside from his studies with Seidlhofer he took counterpoint and composition classes with Alfred Uhl. 1949 he passed the First State Examination and became a finalist in the 1950 Geneva International Music Competition. Having also passed the Diploma Examination in piano in 1951, Graf gave his debut that same year as a soloist at Konzerthaus, Vienna. In the following year he performed several concerts: 1952 at the 4th Queen Elisabeth Music Competition in Brussels, 1953 at the very first International ARD Music Competition in Munich, 1954 he participated for the second time in the Geneva International Music Competition, where he was awarded second place, and again in Brussels at the 1956 Queen Elisabeth Music Competition, where was among the finalists along with Vladimir Ashkenazy, Lazar Berman, André Tchaikowsky, John Browning and Tamás Vasary.

In the meantime Graf had married in 1953 the Brazilian pianist Carmen Vitis Adnet. In 1955, he moved with her to Rio de Janeiro, where their daughters Maria Beatriz and Clarissa were born in 1955 and 1958. In 1957, he founded Seminários de Música Pro-Arte do Rio de Janeiro along with Hans-Joachim Koellreutter and others. In 1958 he followed an invitation by Hans Sittner to return to Vienna, where he taught a piano class at the Academy of Music (now University of Music and Performing Arts Vienna) until his retirement in 1991. Starting in 1963 Graf frequently taught as an instructor at similar institutions in Europe (Seville, Bilbao, Porto), South America and Japan. He also acted as a juror for international piano competitions such as the Paloma O'Shea International Piano Competition, and the Arthur Rubinstein International Master Piano Competition and also joined in the design of the Vienna Beethoven Competition initiated by Josef Dichler and Richard Hauser. Graf interrupted his teaching career in Vienna twice (1971/72 and 1974/75) to accept a visiting professorship at the Jacobs School of Music at Indiana University at Bloomington. After heart surgery in 1985 he was forced to limit his concert appearances. But in 1989 another recording was made that was later published as a CD. It contained an interpretation of Johann Sebastian Bach’s “The Art of Fugue” in Bruno Seidlhofer’s adaptation for four hands, performed with his daughter Clarissa Graf Costa.

He died in Vienna.

== Decorations and awards ==
- Honorary Member of Academia de Música Lorenzo Fernandez (Rio de Janeiro)
- Silver Medal of Honor of the Federal Capital City of Vienna (1988)
- Brazilian National Order of the Southern Cross (1988)
- Austrian Decorations for Science and Art

== Discography ==
- "Die Kunst der Fuge BWV 1080", arrangement of Bruno G. Seidlhofer, Clarissa Graf Costa & Hans Graf (Piano - at four hands), Edition Extraplatte, Vienna, Austria, 1989
- "Saxophone Colors", Eugene Rousseau (Saxophone), Hans Graf (piano), Edition Delos, San Francisco, USA, 1992
- "20th Century Music for Wind Instruments", The Vienna Symphony Woodwinds: Kamillo Wanausek (flute), Friedrich Wächter (oboe); Richard Schönhofer (clarinet); Ernst Mühlbacher (horn); Leo Cermak (fagot); Hans Graf (piano). Edition ABC Paramounts "Westminster"
- "Chopin: Variationen über ein Thema von Mozart "La ci darem la mano"", Orchester Wiener Academia Orchester, Hans Graf (piano), Armando Mota (conductor), Edition Todomusica, Lisboa, Portugal
