= Shabayev =

Shabayev or Shabaev (Russian: Шабаев) is a Tatar masculine surname, its feminine counterpart is Shabayeva or Shabaeva. It may refer to

- Ildar Shabayev (born 1985), Russian football player
- Ilshat Shabaev, Russian dancer, singer and choreographer
- Irina Shabayeva, American fashion designer
- Yevgeny Shabayev (1973–1998), Russian artistic gymnast
