= Mozart Medal (Mozarteum) =

Austrian music award

The Mozart Medal (German: Mozart-Medaille) is an award administered by the International Mozarteum Foundation. It derives its name from Wolfgang Amadeus Mozart. The medal is available in three metal types: gold, silver, bronze.

== Recipients ==
=== Golden ===
- Lilli Lehmann, 1914
- Max Ott, 1918
- Hermann Abert, 1927
- Friedrich Gehmacher, 1933
- Hermann Zilcher, 1941
- Ludwig Schiedermair, 1942
- Alfred Einstein, 1949
- Georges de Saint-Foix, 1949
- Bernhard Paumgartner, 1951
- Vienna Philharmonic, 1956
- Bruno Walter, 1956
- Karl Böhm, 1956
- Christian Bösmüller, 1957
- Friedrich Gehmacher, 1968
- Richard Spängler, 1985
- Sándor Végh, 1991
- Takahide Sakurai, 1995
- Norio Ohga, 1995
- David Woodley Packard, 2002
- Heinz Wiesmüller, 2003
- Wolfgang Rehm, 2006
- Friedrich Gehmacher jr., 2006
- Nikolaus Harnoncourt, 2011
- András Schiff, 2012
- Miloš Forman, 2013
- Alfred Brendel, 2014
- Mitsuko Uchida, 2015
- Mozarteum Orchestra Salzburg, 2015
- Marc Minkowski, 2016
- Robert Levin, 2024

=== Silver ===
- Cecil Bernard Oldman, 1950
- Maria Stader, 1956
- Erich Valentin, 1956
- Hans Sittner, 1971
- Edith Mathis, 1976
- Kurt Neumüller, 1981
- Helmut Eder, 1986
- Peter Schreier, 1975
- Gerhard Wimberger, 1994
- Riccardo Muti, 1998
- Ulrich Konrad, 1999
- Hans Landesmann, 2002
- Peter Ruzicka, 2006

=== Unknown ===
- Julius Ebenstein, 1957
- Albert Richard Mohr, 1981
- Leopold Nowak, 1985

== See also ==
- Mozart Medal (disambiguation)
