= The Tale of Frol Skobeev =

Abhishek Chacko

- Author: Anonymous
- Original title: Повесть о Фроле Скобееве
- Translator: Serge Zenkovsky
- Language: Russian
- Genre: Tale
- Publication date: c. 1680 - c. 1720
- Publication place: Russia

The Tale of Frol Skobeev (Russian: Повесть о Фроле Скобеевe, Povest' o Frole Skobeeve) is an anonymous Russian tale dating from the late seventeenth century or early eighteenth century. The tale is significant as it is one of the earliest Russian literary works to refer to fornication and roguery without any overtones of Christian moral judgment from the narrator. As such, it has been read as one of the first works of secular Russian literature and is often cited as indicative of a broader secularization of Russian society.

== Plot summary ==
The story begins in Novgorod in 1680, where Frol Skobeev, a poor nobleman and legal clerk known locally as a cunning rogue, has designs on marrying Annushka of the prominent and well-placed Nadrin-Nashchekin family. Annushka's father is described as a stol'nik, meaning he was a ranking official in the Tsar's court and probably one of the richer and more influential members of the Russian aristocracy.

Knowing that there is little chance of meeting Annushka in person, or of her father agreeing to their marriage, Frol concocts a devious plan to meet with her. He gets acquainted with Annushka's nurse, offers her money – asking for nothing in return at first – and from her learns that Annushka will shortly be having a Christmas party. He arranges to get his sister invited to the ball, and disguises himself as a noblewoman and comes with her to the party. There, he bribes the nurse to get close to Annushka. The nurse orchestrates matters so that the disguised Frol and Annushka are together in her chambers, and tells him to play a game of 'bride and groom'. Frol reveals himself to Annushka and takes her virginity. While Annushka initially resists him, she quickly finds pleasure in their relationship and keeps Frol in her home for three days under cover, during which time he remains disguised as a woman.

The Nadrin-Nashchenin family, including Annushka, then relocate from Novgorod to Moscow. Frol follows them and again devises a plan to outwit Annushka's parents with the aid of the nurse. This time he sends a carriage to the family home and pretends Annushka is to be taken to her aunt, who is a nun in a local convent. In reality, Annushka elopes with Frol and they marry shortly afterwards.

When Annushka's father discovers she is missing, he publicly campaigns for the return of his daughter and threatens to punish ruthlessly anyone involved in her disappearance. After reflection and taking counsel from a friend, Frol decides to come forward, confess and ask for Nadrin-Nashchekin's mercy. His ingratiating attitude persuades Nadrin-Nashchekin not to punish him. Frol and Annushka also manage to wangle money and valuable items from them. Annushka feigns an illness and her parents send a bejeweled icon; they also begin to send carriages with money and food on a regular basis.

Finally, Nadrin-Nashchekin offers Frol Skobeev a large estate, three hundred rubles and Frol secures a position as his heir. The story concludes by telling us that Frol also managed to arrange a propitious marriage for his sister, and that he and Annushka lived happily after ever.

== Reception ==
We can deduce that Frol Skobeev was well-known and popular among literate Russians throughout the eighteenth century and into the nineteenth century by the records of the number of published copies. The novelist Ivan Turgenev referred to the Tale in a personal letter, calling it "an extraordinarily remarkable work… with superb characters and a movingly naïve style."

== Literary context ==
Writing in early Medieval Russia had been almost exclusively the preserve of the monasteries, and nearly all of the written literature produced before the late seventeenth century could be categorized as historical (chronicles, military tales) or religious (saints' lives, sermons, didactic writing). Lacking a didactic message and a religious theme, Frol Skobeev seemed to mark a change in both the content and tone of Russian literature.

The language used in Frol Skobeev is quite different from that used in earlier written works as well: it uses many colloquialisms and tends to avoid the high register forms that Russian acquired from Old Church Slavonic which were prevalent in medieval Russian religious and historical writing. However, while Frol Skobeev seems innovative compared to earlier medieval written literature, it should be pointed out that Russia may have had a vibrant oral literature which dealt with secular themes such as those found in the tale and used similar colloquial language. Owing to the absence of material on early oral Russian literature, this is impossible to prove.

Frol Skobeev was one of a handful of other texts in the late seventeenth-century Russia that moved away from the models of homiletic, hagiographical and historical writing. The Tale of Savva Grudtsyn and Tale of Woe and Misfortune (Повесть о горе-злочастии) also broke with the literary conventions of the time. However, both these tales conclude with their protagonist renouncing their sins and becoming a monk, while Frol Skobeev never receives a comeuppance for his roguery. The themes of love and sex, clearly evident in Frol Skobeev also began to appear in Russian lyric verse in this period: for example The Songs Attributed to Petr Kvashnin (Песни в записи Петра Квашнина), a collection of twenty-one short love lyrics, are thought to date from 1681.

== Interpretations ==
The fact that Frol Skobeev lacks a moralizing narrator and a didactic conclusion has led many critics to see it as a marking a decisive break in Russian literary tradition. Soviet scholars in particular favoured this view, and coined the term 'democratic satire' to describe Frol Skobeev, arguing that the tale illustrated growing popular discontent with the feudal system and strict control of the Orthodox Church and the state. Critics reading the novel in this way often saw the tale as a precursor to nineteenth-century satire: George Verdansky called it "a realistic and cynical story of a successful rascal, in a sense a forerunner of nineteenth-century realistic satire."

Scholarship in recent years has been more nuanced and commentators have accused the Soviet-era scholars of indulging in broad-brush generalizations which see the work in stark political terms. Gitta Hammberg, for example, questions whether or not the apparent lack of moral judgement in the text is as original a feature as was claimed, pointing to a similar non-judgemental narrative voice in other literary satires. While most commentators have moved away from the Soviet view of the tale as political, most still accept the idea that the tale implicitly supports Frol and his roguery. For example, the historian Nancy Shields Kollmann says that Frol and other rogues of this period were "celebrated as heroes".

Recent work has tended to emphasize how the tale borrowed from and re-worked the traditional hagiographic narrative form. Marcia Morris has argued that the tale can be described as a Russian variation of the picaresque, a satirical mode which developed in Western Europe at the time of the Renaissance and which can be seen in the Spanish novella Lazarillo de Tormes (1554), another society also beginning to develop a written secular literature. The tale is arguably picaresque in both tone and content: it charts the exploits of a rogue in a series of episodes in which he proves his cunning; it is rich in colloquial language and local flavor; it includes bawdy and erotic elements.

There is growing interest in analyzing gender and sexuality in medieval Russian texts. Rosalind McKenzie's feminist reading of Frol stresses the role of Annushka in the text. She argues that Annushka and Frol live in a "dominant/submissive relationship", with Annushka as the dominant partner. She points to the cross-dressing of Frol as evidence of this, and sees Annushka as the real agent behind the intrigues in the story, arguing she has "a talent for turning every situation to her advantage, exploiting every possibility." She also comments "a more realistic character than Frol, having to deal with pertinent female problems of the time ranging from undesirable amorous advances to arranged marriage".

== Theatrical adaptations ==
In 1950, the Soviet composer Tikhon Khrennikov produced a comic opera Frol Skobeev based on the story.

== Translations ==
An English translation is available in Serge A. Zenkovsky's anthology Medieval Russia's Epics, Chronicles and Tales (New York: Meridian, 1974).
