= Walter Deutsch =

Austrian musicologist (1923–2025)

- Deutsch, in 1983
- Born: 29 April 1923; Bozen, Italy
- Died: 13 January 2025 (aged 101); Vienna, Austria
- Occupations: Musicologist; Radio and television presenter; Pianist; Composer
- Organizations: University of Music and Performing Arts Vienna; ORF
- Known for: Research on Austrian folk music
- Awards: Austrian Decoration for Science and Art

Walter Deutsch (29 April 1923 – 13 January 2025) was an Austrian musicologist specialising in folk music research. He first worked as a composer and pianist, but became interested in folk music and performed field research, collecting hundreds of sound documents of songs, pieces and dances. He founded an institute for folk music research at the Wiener Musikakademie in 1965, later including ethnomusicology, and directed it until 1993. He was engaged in the International Council for Traditional Music. Deutsch became famous for running longtime series on ORF, Austrian radio and television, presenting folk musicians live from 1967. He compiled his scientific main opus, a collection of Austrian folk music in 23 volumes entitled Corpus Musicae Popularis Austriacae (COMPA), after he was emerited.

== Life and career ==
Born in Bozen on 29 April 1923, Deutsch grew up in South Tyrol. His father, Cyrill Deutsch, who came from Moravia, was a musician who came to Bozen in 1911 to play first flugelhorn with the band of the imperial army. He first trained to be a hairdresser. The family moved to Kufstein, and he was drafted to the army and sent to North Africa. He was a prisoner of war in the US. After his return in 1946 he studied music pedagogy in Innsbruck, and founded a band to perform US hits. Supported by Josef de Sordi, a player from the Wiener Symphoniker whom he had met in the US, he moved to Vienna to study at the Musikakademie, composition with Alfred Uhl, conducting with Hans Swarowsky, and piano with Franz Eibner. He graduated in 1952. Eibner remained his friend, influencing his thinking about music and its pedagogy, and pointing him at the beauty of Volkslieder.

Deutsch worked first as répétiteur of ballet at the Vienna Volksoper. Simultaneously he had contact to the Volksliedarchiv for Vienna and Lower Austria, where he studied and analysed the material, conducted field research, like earlier Béla Bartók and Zoltán Kodály. He exchanged thoughts with colleagues and began to publish in the field. In 1963, he was appointed a lecturer at the Musikakademie. When its president Hans Sittner pursued the idea to make the institution a university, Deutsch was chosen in 1965 to direct a new Institut für Volksmusikforschung, an institute for folk music research and (later) ethnomusicology; he held the position until 1993. During his tenure, he held seminars about folk music research and European music ethnology, worked for years in an international study group for a system of folk tunes in the International Council for Traditional Music. He worked together with Eibner on the Klier-Deutsch-method to register folk tunes systematically.

From 1992 to 1999, Deutsch was president of Österreichisches Volksliedwerk and was its honorary president since 1999. Deutsch was author and publisher of several books. His scientific main opus is a collection of Austrian folk music in 23 volumes entitled Corpus Musicae Popularis Austriacae (COMPA), compiled after he was emerited.

Deutsch worked as a presenter for ORF for radio and television and became popular. He worked for the state studio of the ORF in Lower Austria from its founding in 1967, creating broadcasts. He realised that in order to broadcast pieces, they first had to collect and produce them. As a pioneer of modern folk music research, he travelled far to collect songs, pieces and dances with microphone and tape recorder. Many of the hundreds of recordings from the 1960s and 1970s also became material of his scientific research. Deutsch was responsible for the section for folk culture and brass music from 1967 to 1984. He planned and presented a monthly radio series on ORF in Lower Austria, entitled "AufhOHRchen", offering 117 episodes of Volksmusikalische Kostbarkeiten (Treasures of folk music). He presented the series Fein sein, beinander bleibn on television over a long time. Many musicians are documented in these broadcasts, invited by Deutsch, who are not featured in any other films.

As a composer, Deutsch wrote several songs to texts and poems by Emil Breisach, and three operas of which he said that nobody needed them and cared for them, "but when you are creative you just have to write". He also composed music for stage and ballet, dances, marches, piano music, chamber music, cantatas and arrangements for choirs. A CD of some of the songs was issued to honour him for his 90th birthday. He turned 100 on 29 April 2023. He had begun in 2022 to pass his Vorlass, a substantial collection of research reports, manuscripts, books and sheet music, to Österreichisches Volksliedwerk.

Deutsch died in Vienna on 13 January 2025, at the age of 101.

== Honours and awards ==
In Deutsch's honour, the Austrian Ministry of Culture created the "Walter-Deutsch-Preis" in 1994, awarded in recognition of special achievements in the field of folk music research. It was awarded untl 2013.

Among his awards and honours are:

- 1955: Förderungspreis für Musik, from the City of Vienna
- 1956: Förderungspreis of the Theodor Körner Prize
- 1967: Förderungspreis of the Dr. Adolf-Schärf-Fond for the support of sciences
- 1974: Ehrenzeichen für Verdienste um das Bundesland Niederösterreich in Gold
- 1992: Raimund-Zoder-Medaille
- 1991: Austrian Decoration for Science and Art
- 1993: Ehrenmedaille der Bundeshauptstadt Wien in Gold
- 1996: Georg-Graber-Medaille
- 2000: Medal of Merit in Gold from the University of Music and Performing Arts Vienna
- 2003: Austrian Decoration for Science and Art, 1st class
- 2011: honorary doctorate from the University of Music and Performing Arts Vienna
- 2023: Austrian Decoration for Science and Art in Gold
