= Ilya Zhestkov =

Executed Soviet serial killer and rapist (1945-1971)

- Born: 1945; Tomsk Oblast, RSFSR
- Died: 1971 (aged 25–26); SIZO-1, Vladivostok, Primorsky Krai, RSFSR
- Cause of death: Execution by shooting
- Other names: "The Primorsk Chikatilo" "The Michman Killer" "The (False) Director"
- Convictions: Murder x5 Rape x7
- Penalty: Death

Details
- Victims: 5
- Span of crimes: May – September 1968
- Country: Soviet Union
- State: Primorsky
- Date apprehended: 18 November 1968

Ilya Zhestkov (Russian: Илья Жестков; 1945 – 1971), known as The Primorsk Chikatilo (Russian: Приморский Чикатило), was a Soviet serial killer and rapist. After initially killing a male acquaintance in Vladivostok in May 1968, he went on to rape and murder four young girls and women until September of that year, presenting himself as a movie director.

Following his arrest, he was tried, convicted on all counts, and subsequently executed.

== Early life ==
Ilya Zhestkov was born in 1945 in the Tomsk Oblast, where he grew up in an environment surrounded by poverty and criminality. Most of his relatives, including his older brother, sister, and uncle, were repeat offenders and were prosecuted for a variety of crimes between the mid-1950s and the mid-1960s.

After graduating from high school, Zhestkov was drafted into the Soviet Army in 1963, where he served in the Navy's Pacific Fleet and reached the rank of michman. Upon completion of his compulsory service, Zhestkov volunteered to continue his service and remained in the Navy, where he was eventually transferred to the Pacific Fleet's headquarters in Vladivostok.

During his service, Zhestkov was regarded negatively by his immediate commanders, as he was repeatedly caught stealing from fellow soldiers, but was nonetheless never subjected to serious disciplinary penalties.

== Murders ==
=== Killing of Albert Lichenko ===
On 19 May 1968, Zhestkov was hanging out at a restaurant near the Vladivostok airport with his girlfriend when he came across 28-year-old sailor Albert Lichenko, a resident of Nakhodka who was on his way to a business trip in Sevastopol. While drinking alcoholic beverages, a quarrel arose between them, after which they went outside to talk it out – however, Zhestkov pulled out his naval dirk and stabbed Lichenko 14 times. Later on, Zhestkov would claim that this killing made him realize that it's better to live in the moment, after which he decided to commit further murders to satisfy his sexual desires.

=== Serial murders ===
Three months after killing Lichenko, Zhestkov began killing women around Vladivostok, luring them in by pretending to be the director of the movie No Password Necessary. Since Vladivostok was classified as a closed city and it was well known that the movie was shot there, his claims did not arouse suspicion in his victims, who willingly accompanied him.

On 2 August 1968, Zhestkov approached 13-year-old Olga Klushina and deceived her into following him to the woods near Vladivostok, where he raped and stabbed her to death with his naval dirk in the neck and chest area. The girl's half-naked corpse was found near kilometer 25, near the railroad and military warehouses, with her hands tied behind her back and the body covered in branches. After killing Klushina, Zhestkov stole her jacket, skirt, and woolen blouse.

On 23 August, Zhestkov came across 19-year-old student Nina Burygina, a resident of Nakhodka who had recently enrolled in the Far Eastern Federal University. After convincing her that he was a movie director, he lured Burygina to the woods near kilometer 25, where he raped and bludgeoned her on the head with a stone five times. He then stole her blouse and a notebook. That same day, Zhestkov attempted to lure another girl named Natalia to the same place using his ruse. While the girl agreed, she first requested to consult with her friend – the other girl approved, but when Natalia went to the designated meeting spot with her friend, the "director" was no longer there. Later on, Natalia wrote in her diary entry about her day, mentioning the encounter with excitement.

On 30 August, using his ruse, Zhestkov lured 19-year-old railway hospital worker Lyubov Strusova to the woods, where he tied her up, raped, and strangled her to death. On 6 September, he raped and stabbed to death 22-year-old streetcar driver Valentina Pasko in the outskirts of Vladivostok. In this case, Zhestkov poked the victim's eyeballs out using a burr. Supposedly, Zhestkov did this because he believed that an image of the killer would somehow remain in the victim's eyes, a belief that came about from his ex-con relatives' stories.

On the following day, Zhestkov attacked and raped another young woman, but for unknown reasons, he released her without killing her and then fled. On 9 September, he lured another young woman to the forest and raped her. After finishing with the assault, he then gave the victim a knife and suddenly offered her to become his mistress, scheduling a meeting between them at the same place tomorrow. The frightened woman did not meet up with him, but also refused to inform police of the ordeal.

== Arrest, trial, and execution ==
The investigation into the murders was handled by the military prosecutor's office and criminal investigation officers, headed by Officer Anatoly Laikov. Since Vladivostok was a closed city and the headquarters of the Pacific Fleet, it was quickly considered that the culprit was likely a sailor. Because of this, investigators focused their search on servicemen who had criminal records or were known to have psychological issues.

In October 1968, Zhestkov became a suspect after it was learned that he was repeatedly disciplined for theft, the most notable of which was him stealing a total of 500 rubles from seven of his fellow servicemen. Upon realizing that he was being investigated, Zhestkov abruptly quit the service and left for Tomsk, where he was arrested on 18 November. He was subsequently charged with the five murders, as the prosecutors had an abundance of witnesses and evidence implicating him in the crimes, most damning of which were belongings of the victims found in his apartment.

In early 1969, Zhestkov started confessing to his crimes and actively participating in recreating how he carried out the killings at the crime scenes. His trial before the Military Court of the Pacific Fleet began in secret in early 1970, lasting only four days. In the end, Zhestkov was found guilty on all counts and sentenced to death by Judge Ivan Rimkunas – upon hearing the verdict, Zhestkov burst into tears and begged for forgiveness from the victims' relatives. He also expressed apparent regret for the crimes, and asked for mercy from the court.

In the following months, Zhestkov sent multiple appeals to the Presidium of the Supreme Soviet, but all of them were ignored. Not long after his appeals were exhausted in early 1971, he was executed in Vladivostok's SIZO-1, but the exact date is unknown.

== In media and literature ==
- Antoine Casse and Irina Kapitanova (2023). The phenomenon of Russian maniacs. The first large-scale study of maniacs and serial killers from the times of tsarism, the USSR and the Russian Federation (Russian: Феномен российских маньяков. Первое масштабное исследование маньяков и серийных убийц времен царизма, СССР и РФ), Eksmo, ISBN 5046081180

== See also ==
- List of Russian serial killers
