= The Tale of Savva Grudtsyn =

Seventeenth-century Russian folktale

- Author: Anonymous
- Original title: Повесть о Савве Грудцыне
- Translator: Serge Zenkovsky
- Language: Russian
- Genre: Tale
- Publication date: c. 1666 - 1668
- Publication place: Russia

The Tale of Savva Grudtsyn (Russian: Повесть о Савве Грудцыне, Povest' o Savve Grudtsyne) is a seventeenth-century Russian tale, thought to have been written between 1666-68. It is frequently regarded as an important literary milestone in Russian literature, as it arguably marks the beginning of novelistic writing in Russia and can be seen as a bridge between medieval and modern Russian literature.

== Plot summary ==
The plot centers on the eponymous hero, Savva Grudtsyn. Savva is the son of Foma Grudstyn-Usov, a merchant from the city of Veliky Ustyug in the northern Vologda region of Russia. As a young man, Savva goes to live in the town of Orel, where he is offered great hospitality by a friend of his father's, Bazhen Vtory.

Bazhen is an old, respected, well-to-do merchant who is married to his third wife, a much younger woman who remained unnamed in the story. Savva is seduced by this woman and begins a sexual relationship with her: the narrator makes it clear that the woman and the Devil are primarily to blame rather than Savva himself. However, while attending church on the holy festival of the Ascension, Savva repents and refuses to continue the affair.

Bazhen's wife, furious, poisons Savva's wine with a powerful aphrodisiac that causes his lust to return. However, she refuses to submit to him when he approaches her and drives him away from the house. Savva, still desperately lusting for Bazhen's wife, makes a Faustian bargain with the Devil: he realizes he would be willing to serve the Devil in order to sleep with this woman. Sure enough, a demon appears in the guise of a brother figure from Veliky Ustyug. He informs Savva that he can have his heart's desire if he writes a letter to renounce Christ and God, which Savva promptly does. The extent of Savva's consciousness in writing the letter is unclear:

Savva visits a golden city with this demon, a representation of Hell, where he is treated to a lavish meal at the table of Satan and presents his letter to him. They continue their travels to the town of Pavlov Perevoz, where a holy beggar tries in vain to get Savva to repent. He gains the respect of the Tsar and fights against the Poles in the city of Smolensk. The demon tells him he will face and defeat three brave warriors, but the third will injure him; indeed this comes to pass.

Shortly afterwards, in Moscow, Savva falls seriously ill while living under the care of a Captain and his wife. His wife calls a priest to get Savva's confession administer the Last Rites, in case he does not survive. He finally confesses to the priest, but a multitude of demons appear and he faces extreme pain and torture when doing so. However, Savva is eventually saved and sees a vision of the Virgin Mary, John the Apostle and Metropolitan Peter of Moscow. He fully recovers physically with the help of the Captain, his wife and the support of the Tsar. He is called by God, and a miracle occurs in church before the Tsar and the Metropolitan: his letter denouncing God becomes a profession of faith to the Virgin Mary and God. Savva renounces his wicked ways, distributes his wealth to the poor and becomes a monk.

== Historical setting ==
The story is fictional, but is clearly situated in a particular time and space, and does contain references to historical personages: both the Grudtsyn-Usov and Vtory families were well-known merchant families. The work is set during the Time of Troubles (1598–1613), a period of political instability in Russia as the line of succession to the throne was interrupted, Cossack rebellion occurred, and Russia had to fend off an invasion from the Polish–Lithuanian Commonwealth. The opening paragraphs of the story refer to Grigorii Otrep'ev, the first of three False Dmitriis, impostors who attempted to claim the Dmitrii Ivanovich, son of the Ivan IV.

The story also refers to the Devil takes Savva to fight against the invading Polish armies and he defeats three warriors.

== Genre and Literary Importance ==
Many critics now consider the tale to represent a transitional period between medieval and modern Russian works of literature. Serge Zenkovsky notes that while hagiographical elements persist in the story of the conversion and the morally didactic conclusion, the fictional plot and vivid realism of the story break with tradition. Zenkovsky tentatively considers the work to be part of a Russian Baroque Literature, but this term remains controversial among Russian literary historians and has not been universally accepted.

Marcia Morris argues that the tale straddles the divide between the epic and novel, as set out by the literary theorist Mikhail Bakhtin in his essay ‘Epos i roman’. She studies narrative voice in the tale and concludes that the opening and closing sections are typical of a medieval, or epic narrator: the moralizing spokesman for universal values; the creator of a closed world. However, the tale becomes more novelistic in the middle sections: time becomes open in the Bakhtinian sense and the narrator loses his omniscience during the middle section when Savva is adventuring with the demon.

The tale, along with The Tale of Frol Skobeev has sometimes been compared to the picaresque mode found in Spanish Baroque literature and other elsewhere, insofar as it charts the adventures of a rogue anti-hero.

The theme of making a pact with the devil has led some commentators to compare the work to Goethe's Faust.

== Interpretations ==
Morris has argued that the references to Grigorii Otrep'ev (False Dmitrii I) in the opening section are not coincidental and argues that the tale is a re-writing of the story of the False Dmitrii I. She argues that Savva’s sexual licentiousness and defiance of morality and social convention resonate with sixteenth-century writings on Otrep'ev, and points to a number of place names and characters in the tale which corresponds to Dmitrii’s story. She explains the final conversion and redemption of Savva as an attempt to ‘reverse’ or re-write the real story of Otrep’ev. His salvation symbolizes the salvation of the Eastern Orthodox Church and Russian state.

== Adaptations ==
A modern re-telling of the Tale was published in 1951 by the émigré Russian writer Aleksei Remizov.

== Translations ==
An English translation is available in Serge A. Zenkovsky's anthology Medieval Russia's Epics, Chronicles and Tales (New York: Meridian, 1974).
