= Igor Moiseyev Ballet =

Russian folk dance troupe (founded 1937)

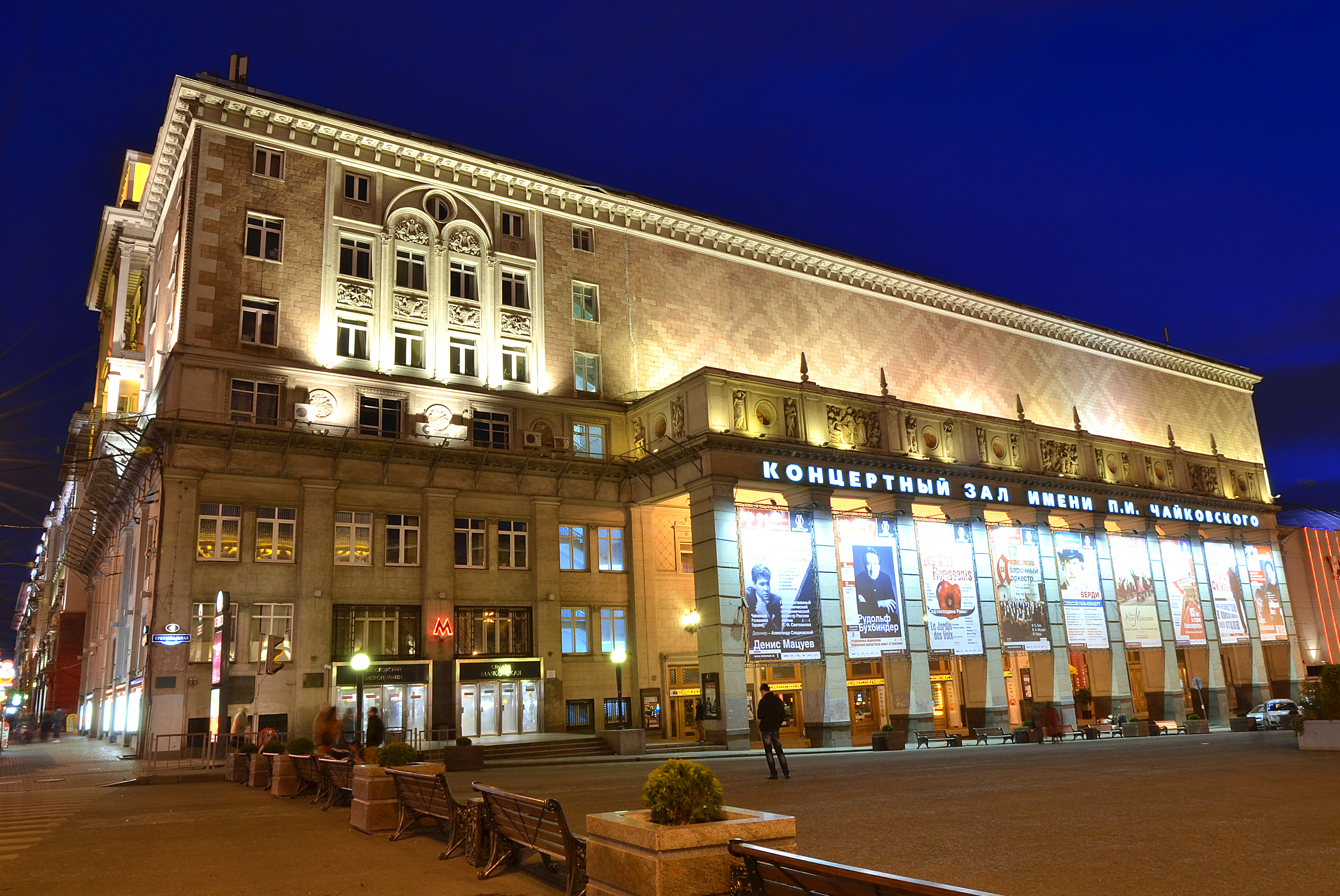
- Tchaikovsky Concert Hall in Moscow, headquarters of the company

General information
- Name: Igor Moiseyev Ballet
- Local name: Балет Игоря Моисеева; Государственный академический ансамбль народного танца имени Игоря Моисеева; Gosudarstvennyy Akademicheskiy Ansambl' Narodnogo Tantsa Imeni Igorya Moiseyeva
- Year founded: 10 February 1937; 89 years ago
- Founders: Igor Moiseyev
- Principal venue: Tchaikovsky Concert Hall
- Website: https://www.moiseyev.ru/

Senior staff
- Chief executive: Aleksey Gladyshev

Artistic staff
- Artistic director: Elena Shcherbakova
- Deputy director: Alla Gladkikh
- Music director: Viktor Kuzovlev
- Principal conductor: Aleksandr Radzetskiy

Other
- Orchestra: Orchestra of the State Academic Ensemble of Folk Dance

The Igor Moiseyev State Academic Ensemble of Popular Dance (Note: Russian: Балет Игоря Моисеева Государственный академический ансамбль народного танца имени Игоря Моисеева, romanized: Gosudarstvennyy Akademicheskiy Ansambl' Narodnogo Tantsa Imeni Igorya Moiseyeva; Also simply called "Moiseyev Dance Company" or "Igor Moiseyev Ballet") is a dance troupe focusing on character dance, based in Moscow, Russia. The troupe combines traditional folk dance and classical ballet techniques to create their style of character dance. It was established in 1937 by Igor Moiseyev. The company has toured in over a hundred countries and is one of the most influential and acclaimed dance troupes of both Soviet and modern Russia.

== History ==
=== Background ===
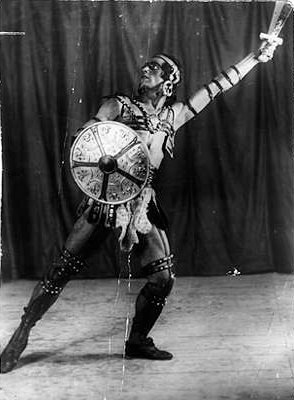
Igor Moiseyev performing the title role of "Salambo", 1932

Igor Moiseyev (1906-2007) was a Soviet balletmaster, dancer and pedagogue. He began to study ballet under teacher and dancer Vera Mosolova in 1918, and showed such promise that Mosolova recommended him to study at the Bolshoi Ballet within 3 months. He entered the school in 1920, where he studied under Alexander Alexeyevich Gorsky and Kasyan Goleizovsky, both of whom felt that ballet was stagnating and were interested in the avant-garde. In the 1920s, Moiseyev performed at the Bolshoi Ballet as a dancer; in the 1930s, he began to choreograph ballets. He aspired to be a ballet choreographer at the Bolshoi, however, he found little success there, so he turned to folk dance.

=== Beginnings ===
In 1936, Igor Moiseyev was made dance director of the new Theater of Folk Art in Moscow, and helped organized a folk dance festival. The next year, on 10 February, the Moiseyev Ballet came into existence, with just 35 dancers. They gave their first performance on 29 August 1937, at the Hermitage Theatre in Moscow. According to Moiseyev, the dance troupe had early difficulties: politician Alexander Poskrebyshev promised to dissolve the ensemble, however, the ensemble had Stalin's patronage. Therefore, neither Poskrebyshev nor any other politician dared to dissolve it. Reportely, Stalin enjoyed the Moiseyev Ballet so much that they were constantly invited to his banquets and parties. At the time, the Moiseyev Ballet had its headquarters in a small building on Leontyev Alley. When Igor Moiseyev asked for a larger building to house the studio, Stalin ordered politician Aleksandr Shcherbakov to organize headquarters for the dance company. Thus, they began to occupy the Tchaikovsky Concert Hall, a building that was previously meant to be Vsevolod Meyerhold's new theater.

Although the company was dedicated to folk dance, not all the choreographed dances were based on genuine folk dances; for instance, the 1937 folk dance "Bulba" is not a true Belarusian folk dance, but rather invented by Moiseyev.

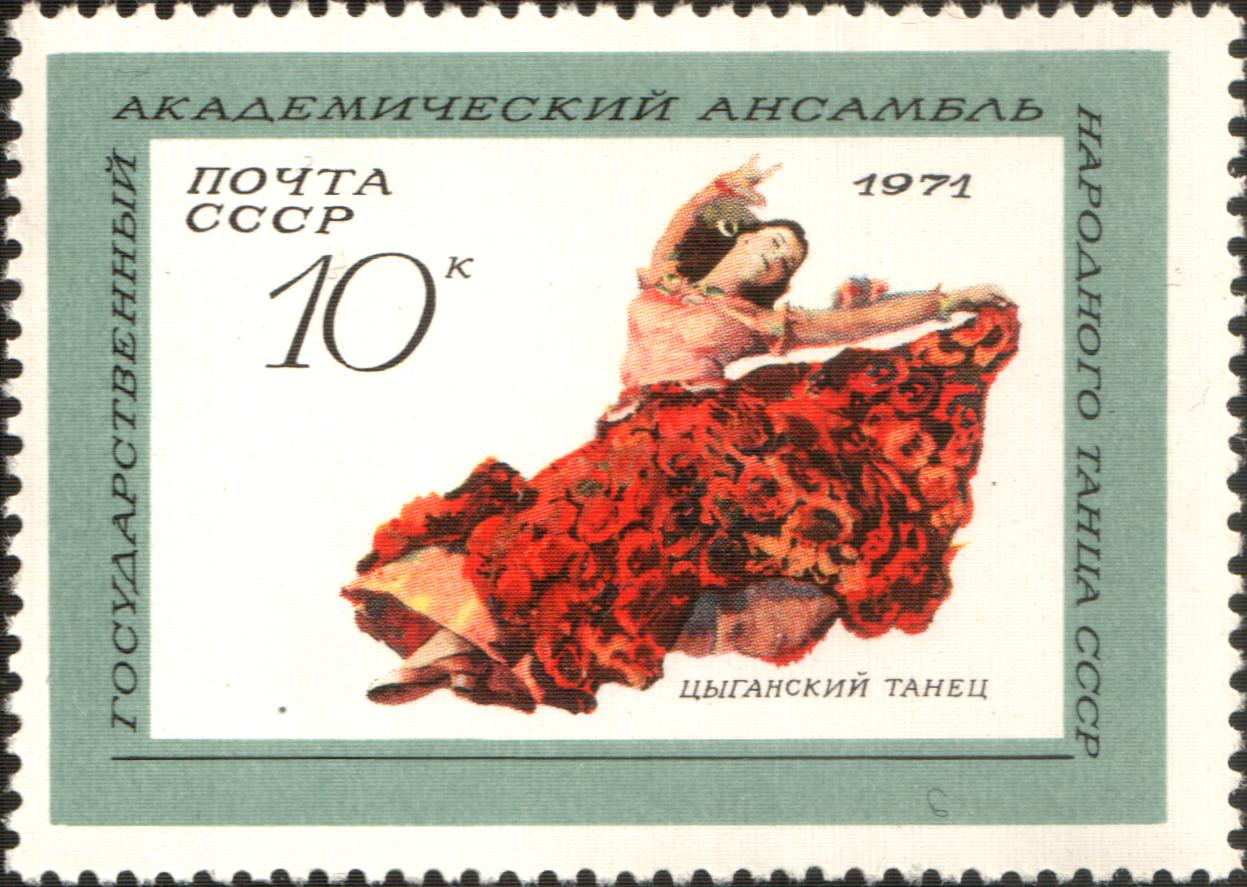
A 1971 Soviet stamp depicting a dancer of the Moiseyev Ballet performing a Romani dance

The first foreign performance of the Moiseyev Ballet occurred in 1945, in Finland. It began to tour around the world in 1955. As of 2019, it has toured in over 100 countries, including the USA, France, Israel, the UK, Japan, and China.

In 1958, they began to tour in the United States, as part of the Lacy-Zarubin Agreement. Impresario Sol Hurok invited the Moiseyev Ballet to perform at the old Metropolitan Opera House, marking the first time a major Soviet dance group had ever performed in the United States. They also appeared on The Ed Sullivan Show.

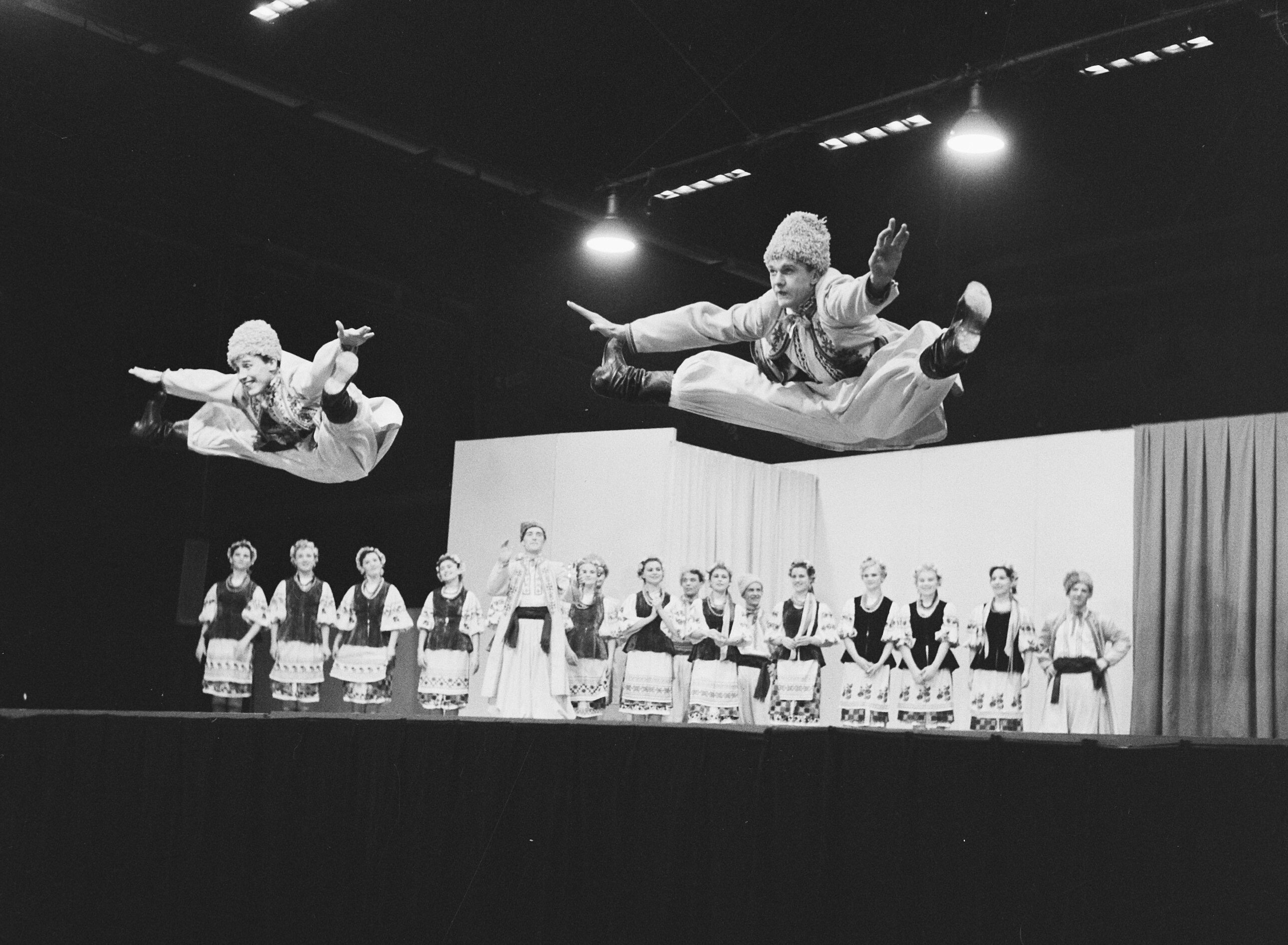
Moiseyev dancers perform the Ukrainian dance Hopak in Rotterdam, 1960

=== JDL incident ===
In September 1986, tear gas was thrown at a Moiseyev Ballet performance at the Metropolitan Opera House, forcing the evacuation of 4,000 people and injuring 30. An anonymous caller purporting to be the chairman of the Jewish Defense League, Chaim Ben Yosef, claimed responsibility, saying it was a protest on the behalf of Soviet Jews. However, the actual chairman at the time, Irv Rubin, denied the JDL's responsibility. Ben Yosef also denied making such a call and denied the JDL's responsibility. In 1987, Ben Yosef and two others were arrested in relation to a series of bombings in New York, including the tear gas attack at the Moiseyev performance.

== Reception ==
John Martin, then the dance critic for the New York Times, wrote in 1961 "Among the truly creative figures in the art of the dance of our time, place high the name of Igor Moiseyev." Anna Kisselgoff wrote that Moiseyev "created a new dance idiom that stood on its own" and called the dances "classics of their genre". She also commented that "If the Moiseyev dances have survived, it is because their artistic quality lifted them above any possible propaganda level."

The Moiseyev Ballet continues to tour and perform to the current day. It has been praised by cultural figures such as Maya Plisetskaya, Tatyana Tarasova, and Marlene Dietrich.

In the West, the Moiseyev Ballet has been described as speaking "the nationalist idiom of folk movement". It has also been called "a symbol of Soviet bureaucracy", a "mirror of the Soviet epoch", and "the main cultural tyrant of the [Soviet] regime". However, it has also been credited with helping encourage international cultural exchange, especially between the USA and the Soviet Union. Diplomatic relations were established between the Soviet Union and Israel in 1989, after the Moiseyev Ballet toured in the latter country.

The Moiseyev Dance Company influenced professional folk dance in Serbia.
