= Into the Storm (opera) =

Opera by Tikhon Khrennikov

Into the Storm (Russian: В бурю; V Buryu) is a 1939 Russian-language opera by Tikhon Khrennikov, which won the approval of Stalin. Khrennikov composed the opera to a libretto by the dramatist Aleksei Faiko and writer Nikolai Virta based on Virta's 1935 debut novel Loneliness (Одиночество»). Into the Storm came under fire from Dmitri Shostakovich.
