= Ilshat Shabaev =

Russian dancer, singer, choreographer, artist and performer

Ilshat Raisovich Shabaev Russian: Ильшат Раисович Шабаев Tatar: Илшат Рәис улы Шабаев
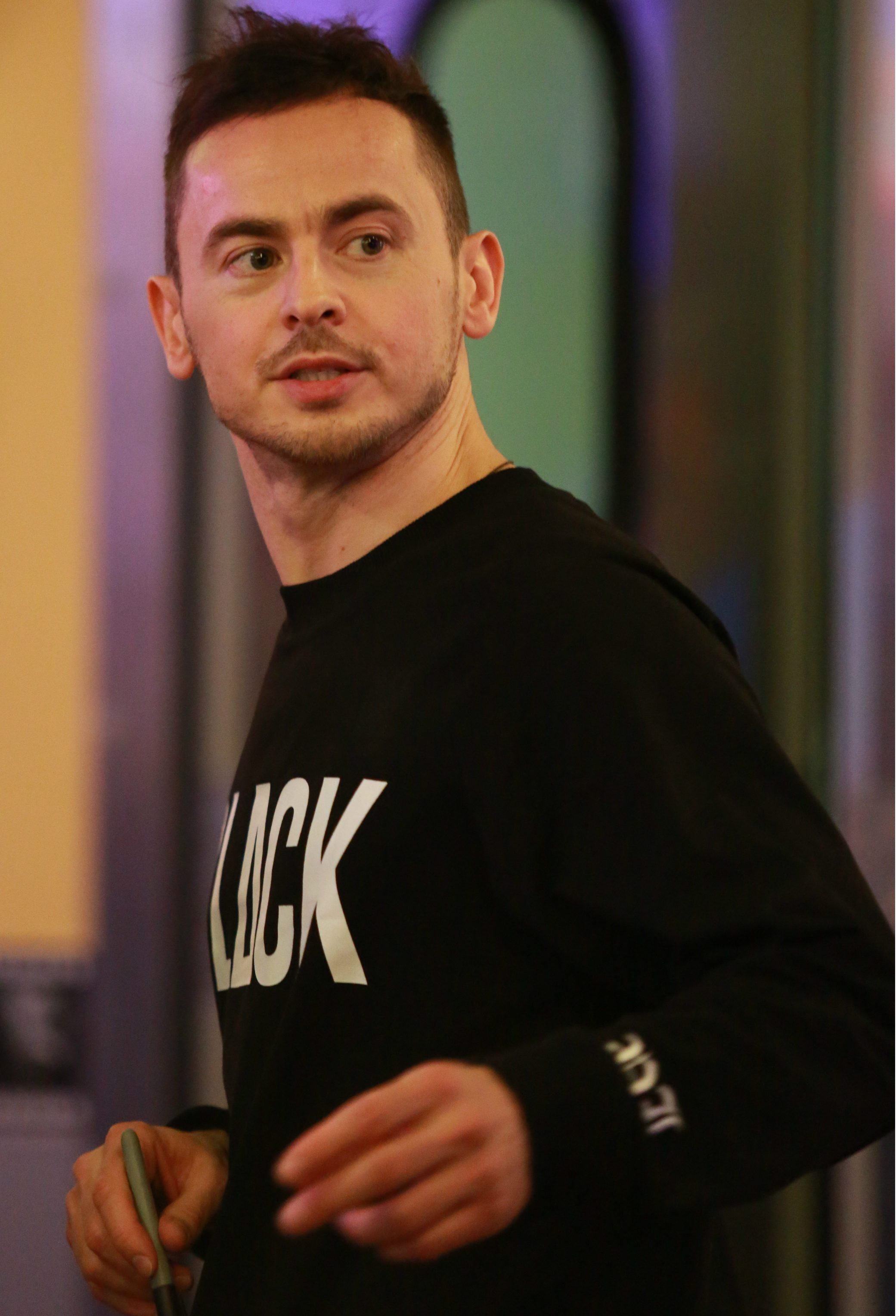
- Born: 8 January 1978 (age 48); Komsomolskiy, Orenburg Oblast, Russian S.F.S.R, Union of Soviet Socialist Republics
- Citizenship: Russia
- Occupation: Dancer
- Years active: 1996 — present

Ilshat Shabaev (Russian: Ильшат Раисович Шабаев, Tatar: Илшат Рәис улы Шабаев) is a Russian dancer, singer, choreographer, artist of musicals, performer of his own tracks. The winner of the project "Star dancing" on MTV channel. The winner of the project "Dancing" on TNT TV channel, the best dancer of Russia under the version of channel TNT. Records tracks, collaborated with a group ALL1, Ilya Myagkov (Graf) and other performers.

== Biography ==
Born in the village of Komsomolskiy, Alexandrovsky district, Orenburg Oblast. When Ilshat was 2, his family moved to Orenburg. He started to dance in early childhood, from the age of four. A few years Ilshat danced in the children's team "Tap dance" under the direction of Victor Y. Bykov, who cites his main teacher and mentor in the world of dance.

After high school Ilshat Shabaev entered the Orenburg art College. During his studies he developed in different dance styles, worked on a physical form. At age of 18 he moved to Moscow and entered the Moscow state University of culture (now IPCC). In parallel, he attended master classes of international stars and famous Russian dancers, honing his technique. Ilshat received offers about moving to the US to work and to develop his talent, but he refused, preferring to work in Russia.

== Early career ==
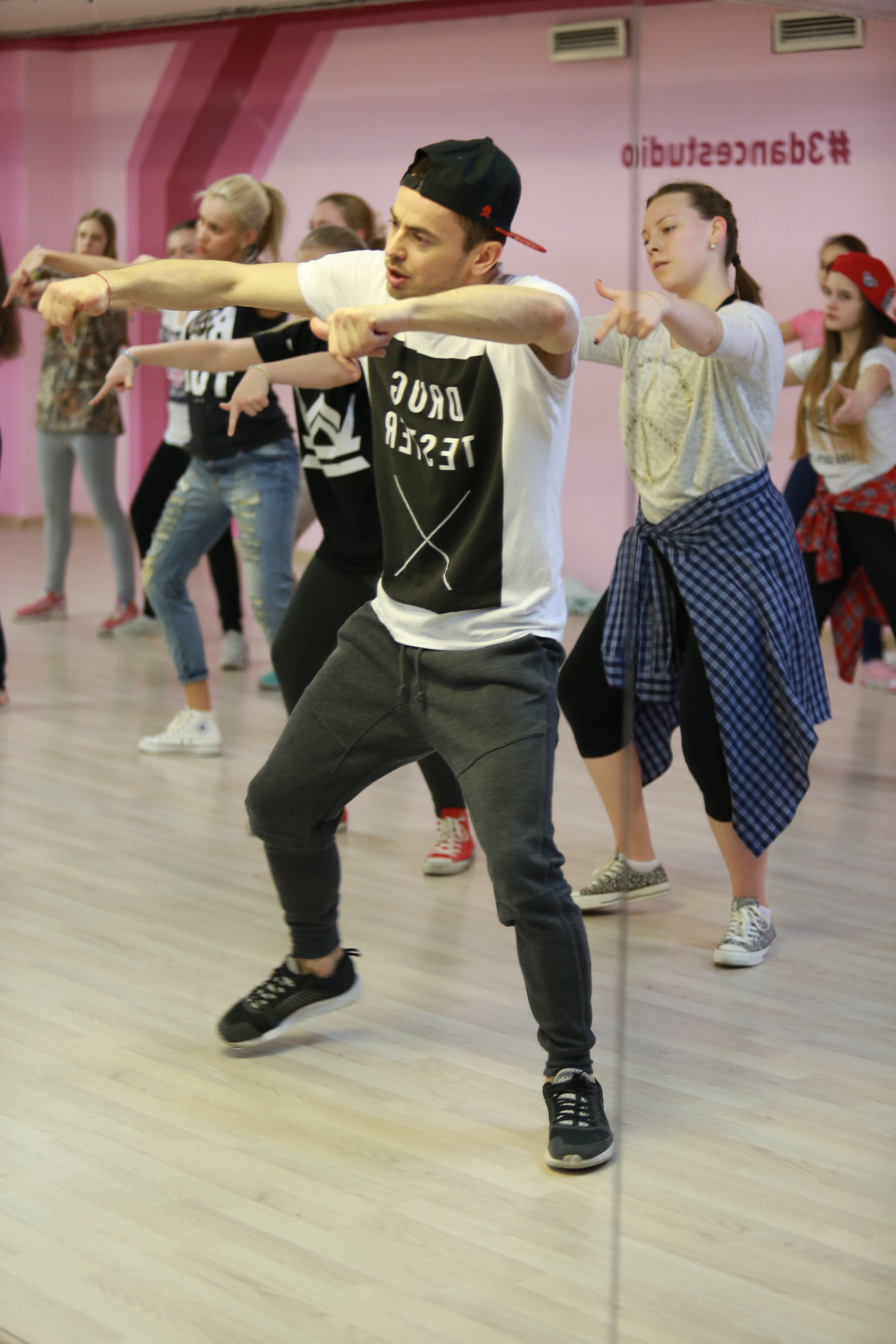
One of Shabaev's master classes

After graduating in IPCC after passing a tough selection, Ilshat during the year he worked at the legendary Igor Moiseyev, studied at the school of modern dance, Alexander Shishkin. The first show in which he participated, was the famous "Notre Dame de Paris". For this he had to undergo three stages of casting, which lasted a whole year. In 2003, the dancer worked as a choreographer with the singer, the participant "Factories of stars-2" Irakli, touring with him around the country. Also as a choreographer he has worked with such artists as Lil Wayne, Vlad Topalov, Sergey Lazarev and others. In 2006 Ilshat worked on contract in Israel – danced in a Grand show of "One" famous Israeli singer Rita. He also worked on contract in China. After that Ilshat again active in musicals.

In 2010–2012 he played in two productions, the Director of which was Yegor Druzhinin. We are talking about the musical "Love and espionage" (on the play of E. graminea "Eye of the day") with Larisa Dolina and Dmitry Haratyan and starring "I am Edmond Dantes" (based on the novel A. Dumas "the Count of Monte Cristo"), in which starring Dmitri Pevtsov and Natalia Vlasova. As in 2013, became the celebrated musical "Chicago", on the Broadway. According to the choreographer, in this musical, he's got the most experience. There he mastered the genre as "Fosse". In summer 2014 Ilshat played the role of Gopika in the musical "Once in Odessa", organized by the popular TV series of the same name. Also Ilshat participated in musicals such as "Bombay Dreams" and "Cats".

== Private life ==
Shabaev is not married, he has no children.
