= Bulba =

Concert dance of Belarus

Bulba (Бульба, [ˈbulʲba]) is a concert dance based on Belarusian folk traditions, choreographed, among several others, by Igor Moiseyev. The word means "potato" in Ukrainian and Belarusian.

Moiseyev created the dance after visiting Belarus in late 1930s. He masterfully recreated the Belarusian folklore, so that the dance has become Belarusian national dance, featured by all national folk dance ensembles.

The dance was choreographed to the vivid tune of the Belarusian folk song with the same name, Bulba ("Potato"), Moiseyev overheard during his visit. The dance and the song humorously portray the whole process of potato production.

In his memoirs, Moiseev wrote:

When in 15 years I visited Belarus again, I've noticed that my Bulba was being danced everywhere. I would ask them: 'Where have you got this dance?' They would answer: 'It has always been around.' At the same time, folklorists assured me that this dance appeared in Belarus only after my choreography. If your creation is accepted by folk so as to consider it to be their own, this would be the highest form of the recognition!
