= No Password Necessary =

1967 Soviet action film directed by Boris Grigorev

- Russian: Пароль не нужен
- Directed by: Boris Grigorev
- Written by: Yulian Semyonov
- Starring: Nikolay Gubenko; Mikhail Fyodorov; Rodion Nahapetov; Vasiliy Lanovoy; Anastasiya Voznesenskaya
- Cinematography: Konstantin Arutyunov
- Music by: Tikhon Khrennikov
- Release date: 1967
- Country: Soviet Union
- Language: Russian

No Password Necessary (Russian: Пароль не нужен) is a 1967 Soviet historical action film directed by Boris Grigorev.

== Plot ==
The film takes place in the Far East in 1921. The surviving White Guards, with the help of Japan, launch a coup, while the Bolsheviks go underground. It is based on the 1966 novel of the same name by Yulian Semyonov.

== Cast ==
- Nikolay Gubenko as Commander Blyukher
- Mikhail Fyodorov as Pavel Postyshev
- Rodion Nahapetov as Vsevolod Vladimirov
- Vasiliy Lanovoy
- Anastasiya Voznesenskaya as Sashenyka Gavrilina
- Aleksandr Barushnoy
- Eduard Bredun
- Igor Dmitriev
- Valeri Malyshev
- Vladimir Solopov
