= Mozart Medal =

The Mozart Medal may refer to several awards named after Wolfgang Amadeus Mozart:

- Mozart Medal (Frankfurt) (Mozart Medaille), awarded by the city of Frankfurt
- Mozart Medal (Mexico), administered at times by the Austrian embassy in Mexico, the Domecq Cultural Institute, and the Academia Medalla Mozart
- Mozart Medal (Mozarteum) by the International Mozarteum Foundation
- Mozart Medal (Mozartgemeinde), awarded by the Mozartgemeinde Wien (Vienna Mozart Society)
- UNESCO Mozart Medal, awarded by UNESCO
