= UNESCO Mozart Medal =

The UNESCO Mozart Medal is an award named after Wolfgang Amadeus Mozart and administered by UNESCO.

== Recipients ==
- Elisabeth Schwarzkopf, 1991
- Alicia Terzian, 1995
- Elfi von Dassanowsky, 1996
- Igor Moiseyev, 2001, for "outstanding contribution to world music culture"
- Hanna Kulenty, 2003
- Tikhon Khrennikov, 2003
- Purcell School of Music, February 6, 2003
- Mohammad-Reza Shajarian, 2006
- Mstislav Rostropovich, 2007
- Mehriban Aliyeva, 2010
- Tamás Vásáry, 2012, for "his talent and dedication to the universal values that inspire UNESCO"

== See also ==
- Mozart Medal (disambiguation)
