= Tikhon Khrennikov =

Soviet and Russian composer (1913–2007)

- Тихон Хренников
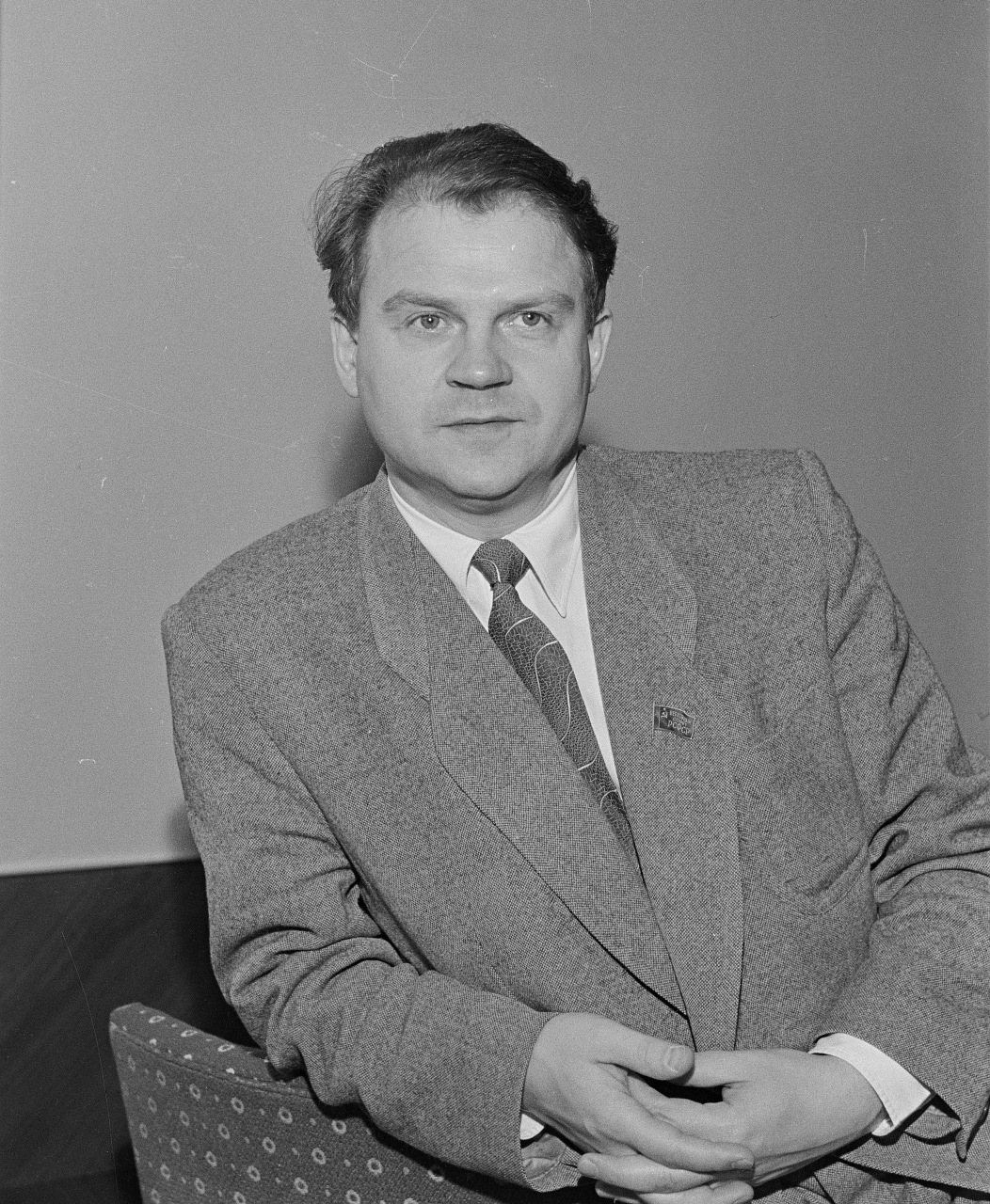
- Photograph of Tikhon Khrennikov in Dresden on 1956

Member of the Soviet of Nationalities of the 6-11 convocations
- In office 1962–1989

General Secretary of the Soviet Union of Composers
- In office 1948–1991
- Preceded by: Boris Asafiev

Personal details
- Born: 28 May [O.S. 15 May] 1913 Yelets, Russia
- Died: August 14, 2007 (aged 94) Moscow, Russia
- Resting place: Yelets, Russia
- Party: CPSU
- Education: Moscow Conservatory
- Occupation: Composer; film composer; pianist; music teacher

Tikhon Nikolayevich Khrennikov (Russian: Тихон Николаевич Хренников; 10 June [O.S. 28 May] 1913 – 14 August 2007) was a Russian and Soviet composer, pianist, and General Secretary of the Union of Soviet Composers (1948–1991), who was also known for his political activities. He wrote three symphonies, four piano concertos, two violin concertos, two cello concertos, operas, operettas, ballets, chamber music, incidental music and film music.

During the 1930s, Khrennikov was already being hailed as a leading Soviet composer. In 1948, Andrei Zhdanov, the leader of the anti-formalism campaign, nominated Khrennikov as Secretary of the Union of Soviet Composers. He held this influential post until the collapse of the Soviet Union in 1991.

== Biography ==
=== Early years ===
Tikhon Khrennikov was the youngest of ten children, born into a family of horse traders in the town of Yelets, Oryol Governorate, Russian Empire (now in Lipetsk Oblast in central Russia).

He learned guitar and mandolin from members of his family and sang in a local choir in Yelets. There he also played in a local orchestra and learned the piano. As a teenager he moved to Moscow. From 1929 to 1932, he studied composition at the Gnessin State Musical College under Mikhail Gnessin and Yefraim Gelman. From 1932 to 1936, he attended the Moscow Conservatory. There he studied composition under Vissarion Shebalin and piano under Heinrich Neuhaus. As a student, he wrote and played his Piano Concerto No. 1, and his graduation piece was the Symphony No. 1. His first symphony was conducted by Leopold Stokowski. He became popular with the series of songs and serenades that he composed for the 1936 production of Much Ado About Nothing at the Vakhtangov Theatre in Moscow.

By the 1930s, Khrennikov was already treated as a leading Soviet composer. Typical was his speech during a discussion in February 1936 concerning Pravda articles "Muddle Instead of Music" and "Balletic Falsity":

The resolution on 23rd April 1932 appealed to the consciousness of the Soviet artist. Soviet artists had not withstood scrutiny. After 23rd April, youth was inspired to study. The problem was, we had to master the skills and techniques of composition. We developed an enthusiasm for modern western composers. The names of Hindemith and Krenek came to be symbols of advanced modern artists. [...] After the enthusiasm for western tendencies came an attraction to simplicity, influenced by composing for the theatre, where simple, expressive music was required. We grew, our consciousness also grew, as well as the aspiration to be genuine Soviet composers, representatives of our epoch. Compositions by Hindemith satisfied us no more. Soon after that Prokofiev arrived, declaring Soviet music to be provincial and naming Shostakovich as the most up-to-date composer. Young composers were confused: on the one hand, they wanted to create simpler music that would be easier for the masses to understand; on the other hand, they were confronted with the statements of such musical authorities as Prokofiev. Critics wrote laudatory odes to Shostakovich. […] How did young composers react to Lady Macbeth [of Mtsensk]? This opera contains several large melodic fragments which opened some creative perspectives to us. But the entre‘actes and other things aroused complete hostility.

Together with other representatives of Soviet culture (Nikolay Chelyapov, Nikolai Myaskovsky, Nikolay Chemberdzhi, Sergei Vasilenko, Victor Bely, Alexander Veprik, Aram Khachaturian, Boris Shekhter, M. Starodokamsky, Georgy Khubov, Vano Muradeli, Vladimir Yurovsky and Lev Kulakovsky), Khrennikov signed the statement welcoming "a sentence of the Supreme Court of the Soviet Union, passed on traitors against the motherland, fascist hirelings, such as Tukhachevsky, Yakir and others".

Having "adopted the optimistic, dramatic and unabashedly lyrical style favored by Soviet leaders", Khrennikov shot to fame in 1941, with the "Song of Moscow" ("Свинарка и пастух", meaning "Swineherd and Shepherd") from his music score for the popular Soviet film They Met in Moscow, for which he was awarded the Stalin Prize. In 1941, Khrennikov was appointed music director of the Central Theatre of the Red Army, a position he would keep for 25 years.

In February 1945 Khrennikov was officially posted by the Political Authority (Politupravlenie) of the Red Army from Sverdlovsk, where he and his family had been evacuated, to the First Belorussian Front, and the Army commanded by General (later Marshal) Chuikov.

In 1947 he joined the CPSU and became a deputy of the Supreme Soviet.

=== General Secretary of the Union of Soviet Composers ===
On 10 January 1948, more than 70 composers, musicians and music lecturers were summoned to a three-day conference in the Kremlin, to be lectured by the communist party's chief ideologist Andrei Zhdanov on how to write music. As one of the main speakers, Khrennikov backed the party line, and attacked all three of the greatest composers present, Dmitri Shostakovich, Sergei Prokofiev and Khachaturian. Years later, he defended his behaviour by telling a BBC correspondent: "They told me - they forced me - to read out that speech attacking Shostakovich and Prokofiev. What else could I have done? If I had refused, it would have been curtains for me."

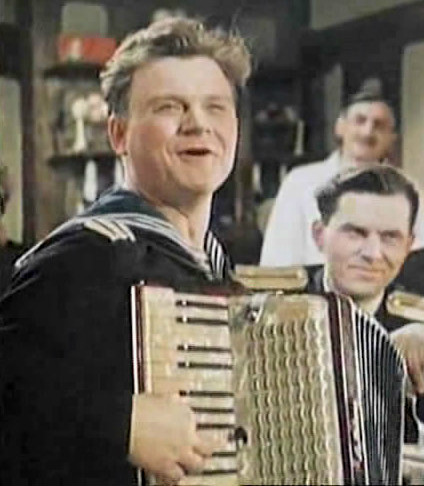
Tikhon Khrennikov as a passenger in the film The Train Goes East (1947)

In 1948, Joseph Stalin appointed Khrennikov General Secretary of the Union of Soviet Composers, a position he would keep until the union was disbanded with the collapse of the Soviet Union in 1991.

In an interview with pianist Jascha Nemtsov on 8 November 2004 in Moscow, Khrennikov asserted that composer Mieczysław Weinberg, when arrested, had been discharged immediately because of Khrennikov's protection. According to Khrennikov the same had happened to Alexander Veprik. Extant evidence demonstrates that Veprik spent four years in a prison camp and Mieczysław Weinberg was released in June 1953 because of Stalin's death.

In 1949, Khrennikov officially attacked the composer Alexander Lokshin, using formulations of one of Stalin's ideologists, Pavel Apostolov. In his speech Khrennikov contrasted Lokshin's "modernist" style with the bylina Stepan Razin's Dream by Galina Ustvolskaya, which he considered an ideal example of true national art.

Khrennikov's speech aroused great indignation in Mikhail Gnessin, who accused him of duplicity: not daring to criticise Lokshin in a professional environment, Khrennikov attacked him ideologically from his position as a leading Soviet official. After this ideological campaign Lokshin was excluded from academic circles.

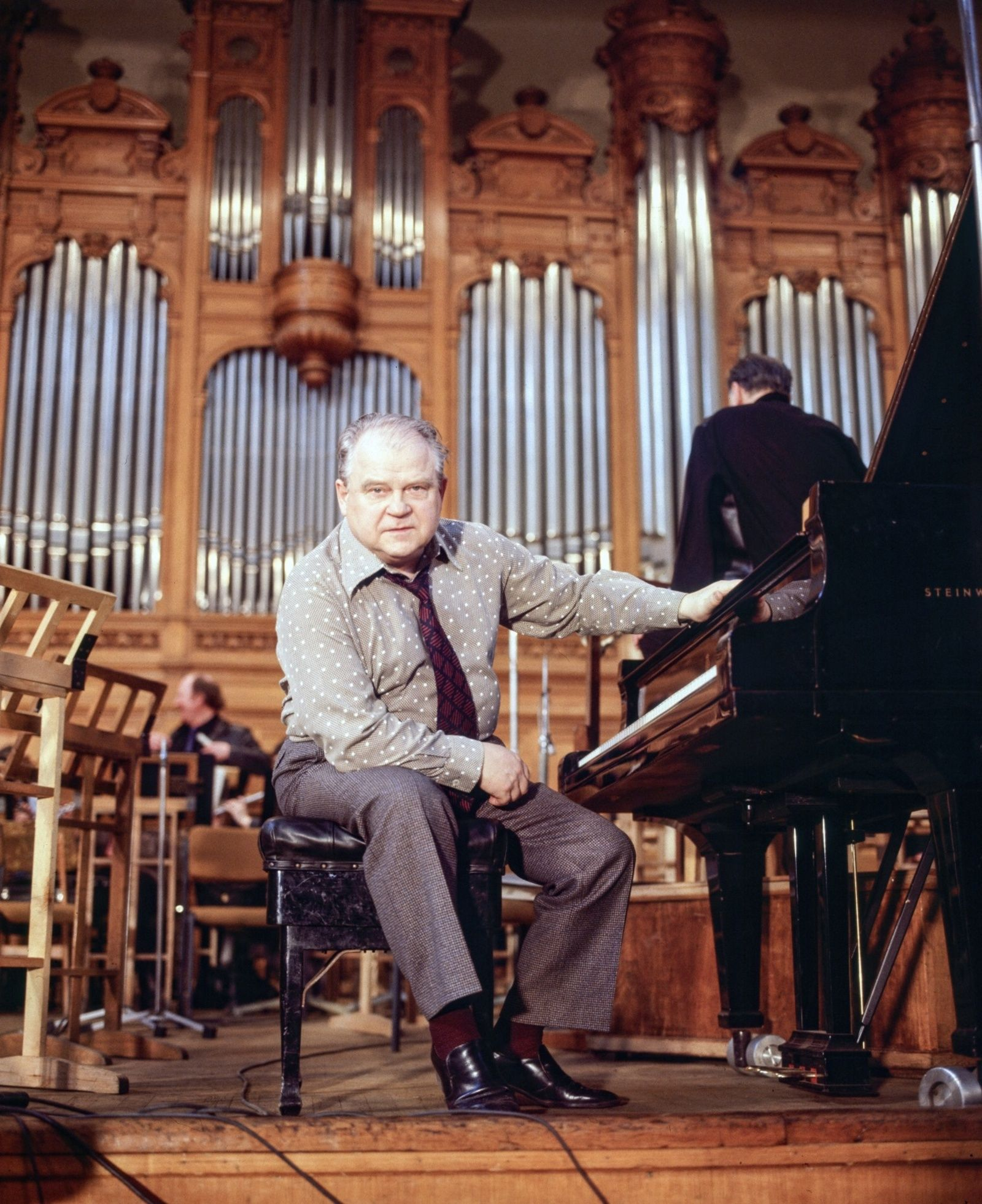
Photograph of Khrennikov with piano in 1982

Khrennikov did not prevent Prokofiev's first wife, Lina Codina, from being charged as a "spy" following her arrest by the NKVD on 20 February 1948. As head of the Composers' Union, Khrennikov made no attempt to have the sentence against Lina Prokofieva quashed or reduced. The Composers' Union did not help Prokofiev's sons, who were compulsorily evicted from their apartment. After Codina returned from the Gulag, the Union of Soviet Composers did nothing to improve the extremely bad living conditions of her family; it was the prominent singers Irina Arkhipova and Zurab Sotkilava who protected Prokofiev's first family. Afterwards, the family was exposed to regular official humiliations. According to Prokofiev's first son, Sviatoslav, the Union refused Codina permission to go to Paris, even though she had been personally invited by the French culture minister to the opening of Prokofiev's memorial plaque. Instead, Khrennikov took part in that ceremony with his whole family. The Union also refused Lina Prokofieva permission to go to the opening of the Sydney Opera House. At the same time, Sviatoslav Prokofiev noted the typical logic of the Soviet functionary: sometimes Khrennikov could help if it was not dangerous for his own position and career.

The ideological campaigns of 1948–49 against musical formalism were directly connected with the offensive against "rootless cosmopolitans," which formed a part of the state anti-Semitism in the Soviet Union that flourished after the Second World War. The leadership of the Union of Soviet Composers branded certain composers as "Zionist aggressors" or "agents of world imperialism", and made accusations of "ideologically vicious" and "hostile" phenomena in Soviet musical culture. An accusation of Zionism was often used as a weapon against people of different nationalities, faiths and opinions, such as Nikolai Roslavets. "Struggle against formalists" was pursued in other countries too. According to György Ligeti, after Khrennikov's official visit to Budapest in 1948, The Miraculous Mandarin by Béla Bartók was removed from the repertoire and paintings by French impressionists and others were removed from display in museums.

Khrennikov and other functionaries of the Union of Soviet Composers constantly attacked the heritage of the Russian avant-garde as well as its researchers. For example, the East German musicologist Detlef Gojowy (1934–2008) was persecuted because of his promotion in the West of modern Soviet music of the 1920s. Gojowy was proclaimed to be an "anti-Soviet writer" – until 1989 he was forbidden to visit the Soviet Union and some of his publications that he sent to Soviet colleagues were intercepted by customs. At the same time, Soviet musicologists engaged in developing a Russian avant-garde tradition were officially prohibited from going abroad. Once again, Nicolai Roslavets was an example.

Khrennikov was a Member of Central Committee of the Communist Party of the Soviet Union from the 1950s on. From 1962, he was a representative in the Supreme Soviet of the USSR.

=== Later years ===
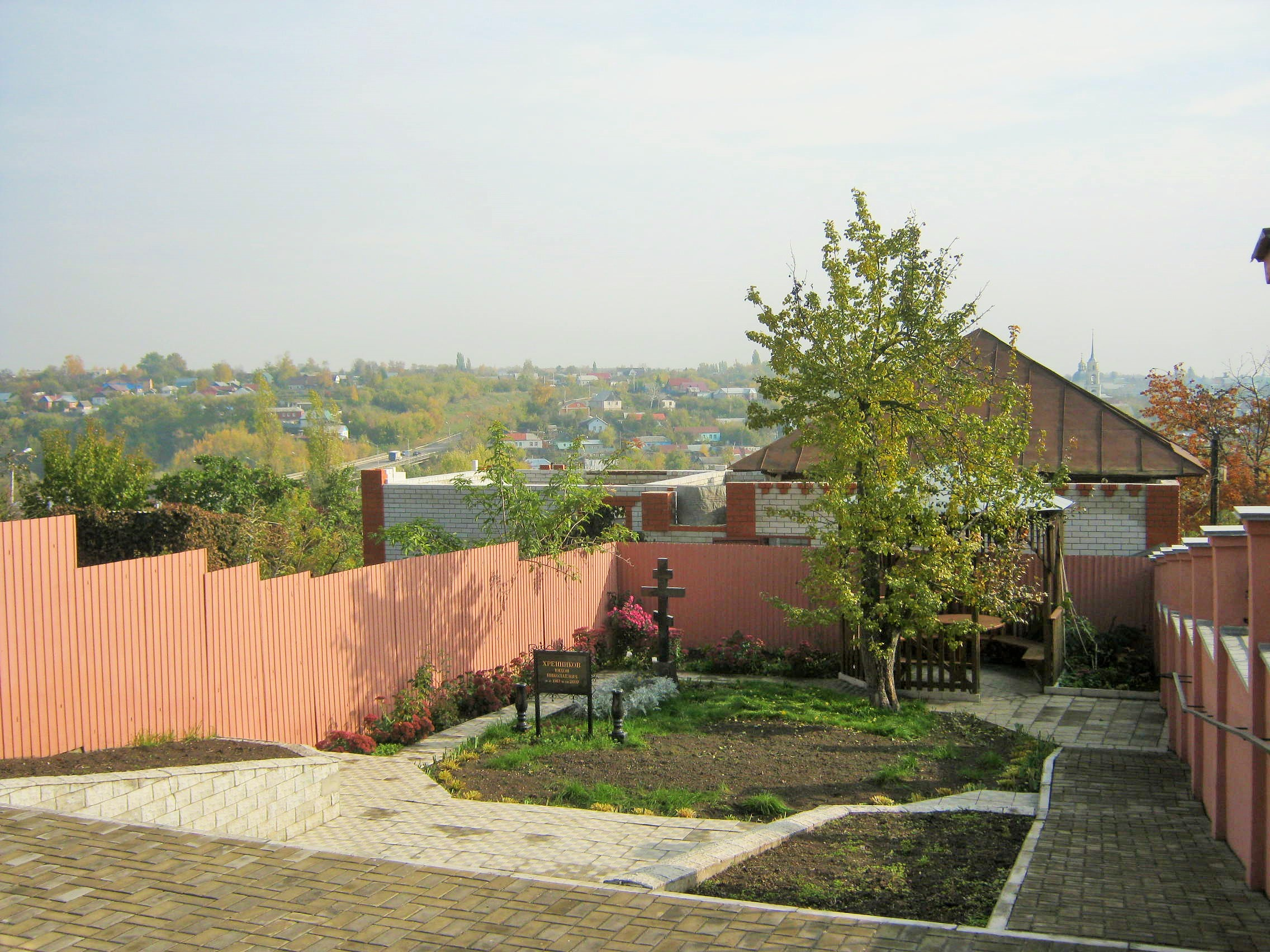
Khrennikov's grave at Yelets

In his last years, Khrennikov publicly stated his disapproval of Perestroika, its leaders, and the fall of the Soviet Union:

It was a betrayal by our leaders. I consider Gorbachev and his henchmen, who deliberately organised persecution of Soviet art, to be traitors to the party and the people [...]".

In another interview given to the same newspaper Zavtra (meaning "Tomorrow") he described Stalin as a "genius", an "absolutely normal person", tolerant of criticism:

Stalin, in my opinion, knew music better than any of us. […] As in classical Ancient Greece, so too in the Soviet Union music was of the greatest importance to the state. The spiritual influence of the greatest composers and artists in the formation of intelligent and strong-willed people, first of all through radio, was huge.

Khrennikov's memoirs were published in 1994. Months before his death in Moscow on August 14, 2007, at the age of 94, Khrennikov had two requests in his will: to be buried in the city where he was born and have his grave next to his parents. He also requested to have an Orthodox cross erected on the grave. Both wishes were granted.

== Compositions ==
=== Symphonies ===
- Symphony No. 1 in B-flat minor, Op. 4 (1933–35)
- Symphony No. 2 in C minor, Op. 9 (1940–42)
- Symphony No. 3 in A major, Op. 22 (1973)

=== Other symphonic works ===
- "Mik", suite for orchestra, Op. 3 (1934)
- Much Ado About Nothing, incidental music, Op. 7 (1935–36)
- "Don Quichotte" by Mikhail Bulgakov, suite for orchestra, Op. 10 (1941)
- "Love For Love", suite from the ballet, Op. 24b (1976)
- "A Hussar Ballad", suite from the ballet, Op. 25b (1978)

=== Concertos ===
- Piano Concerto No. 1 in F major, Op. 1 (1932–33)
- Violin Concerto No. 1 in D major, Op. 14 (1958–59)
- Cello Concerto No. 1 in C major, Op. 16 (1964)
- Piano Concerto No. 2 in C major, Op. 21 (1972)
- Violin Concerto No. 2 in C major, Op. 23 (1975)
- Three Pieces for Violin and orchestra, Op. 26b (1978)
- Piano Concerto No. 3 in C major, Op. 28 (1983–84)
- Cello Concerto No. 2, Op. 30 (1986)
- Piano Concerto No. 4, for piano, string orchestra and percussion, Op. 37 (1991)

=== Operas ===
- "Into the Storm", four acts, Op. 8 (1936–39) - Libretto by A. Faiko and Nikolai Virta based on N. Virta's novel "Loneliness".
- "Brother-in-Law Without Kindred (Frol Skobeev)", comic opera, Op. 12 (1945–50) - Libretto by S. Tsenin after D. Averkiev's Play "Frol Skobeev".
- "Mother", three acts, Op. 13 (1952–57) - Libretto by A. Faiko based on Maxim Gorky's novel "Mother".
- "One Hundred Devils and Just One Girl", operetta in three acts, Op. 15 (1962–63) - Libretto by E. Shatunovsky.
- "A White Night", musical chronicle in three acts, Op. 17 (1966) - Libretto by Y. Shanutovsky, after Tolstoi.
- "The Low-Born Son-in-Law" (1967) - second version of "Frol Skobeyev" (1950)
- "The Boy Giant", children's opera in three acts, Op. 18 (1968–69) - Libretto by N. Shestakov and N. Satz.
- "Much Ado About Hearts", three acts (1972–73) - Libretto by Boris Pokrovsky after Shakespeare's "Much Ado About Nothing".
- "Dorothea", two acts, Op. 27 (1982–83)
- "Golden Calf", Op. 29 (1984–85), based on the novel by Ilf and Petrov
- "The Naked King", comic opera, Op. 31 (1988)
- Musical for children "Wonders, oh, wonders!", musical for children (2001)
- "At 6 P.M. After the War", musical (2003)

=== Ballets ===
- "Our Courtyard" (Happy Childhood), children's ballet in one act, Op. 19 (1970)
- "Love For Love", two acts, Op. 24 (1976)
- "A Hussar Ballad", three acts, Op. 25 (1978)
- "Napoleon Bonaparte", Op. 40 (1994)
- "The Captain's Daughter", Op. 41 (1999)

=== Music for plays ===
- "Mik" (1934)
- "Alexander Shigorin" (1935–36)
- "Big Day" (1937)
- "Guilty Without a Sin" (1937)
- "I'm the Son of Working People" (1938)
- "Romantics" (1939)
- "Don Quichotte" by Mikhail Bulgakov (1941)
- "A Long Time Ago" (1942)
- "Birthday" (1944)
- "Marine Officer" (1944)
- "Wise Things" (1965)
- "Rootless Son-in-law" (1966)

=== Chamber music ===
- "Birkenstamm", version for violin ensemble (1935)
- String Quartet No. 1, Op. 33 (1988)
- String Quartet No. 2, Op. 40 (1993)
- Three Pieces for Violin and piano, Op. 26 (1978)
- Sonata for Cello and piano, Op. 34 (1989)
- Five Pieces for woodwind instruments, Op. 35 (1990)

=== Piano works ===
- Five Pieces for piano, Op. 2 (1933)
- Three Pieces for piano, Op. 5 (1934–35)
- Five Pieces for piano, Op. 38 (1992)
- Six Children's Pieces for piano, Op. 42 (2002)

=== Vocal and choral works ===
- Three Romances for voice and piano after Pushkin, Op. 6 (1935)
- "Birch Tree", song for voice and piano (1935)
- Three Lieder for voice and piano, Op. 7b, from the incidental music "Much Ado About Nothing", Op. 7 (1935–36)
- "Three Pans", song for voice and piano (1939)
- "We Are Masters of the War", song for chorus and piano (1941)
- "Song About a Moscow Girl", song for voice and piano (1941)
- "Song About Friendship", song for voice and piano (1941)
- Five Romances for voice and piano after Robert Burns, Op. 11 (1942)
- "Farewell", song for voice and piano (1942)
- "There is a Good Town in the North", song for chorus and piano (1942)
- "New Year’s", song for voice and piano (1942)
- "Everybody for the Motherland", song for chorus and piano (1942)
- "Men from Ural are Great Warriors", song for chorus and piano (1942)
- "Song of the Soviet Union", song for chorus and piano (1943)
- "Luchint’s Song", song for chorus and piano (1943)
- "Song of Song", song for voice and piano (1944)
- "Waiting Home", song for voice and piano (1944)
- "Moscow’s Windows", song for voice and piano (1960)
- "Morning Song", song for voice and piano (1960)
- "Our Soviet Country", song for chorus and piano (1964)
- Three Poems for chorus, Op. 20 (1971)
- Three Sonnets by W. Shakespeare for voice and piano, Op. 32 (1988)
- Three songs based on the lyrics by Nekrasov for chorus a capella, Op. 36 (1990)
- Five Romances after lyrics by Ivan Bunin, Op. 39 (1992)
- "Tatyana’s Day", waltz, for voice and piano (2004) - after Mikhail Lomonosov

=== Film music ===
- "Struggle Is Still On" (1938)
- "Swineheard and Shepherd" (1941)
- "Return with Victory" (1941)
- "Six O’Clock in the Evening After the War" (1944)
- "The Train Goes East" (1947)
- "Miners of Donetsk" (1950)
- "Cavalier of the Golden Star" (1951)
- "At Six PM after the War" (1952)
- "True Friends" (1953)
- "The Captain's Daughter" (1958)
- "Hussar Ballad" (1961)
- "Comrade Arseny" (1964)
- "No Password Necessary" (1967)
- "Mother" (1968) - sound version of the 1926 silent film
- "Three" (1969)
- "Ruslan and Ludmila" (1972)
- "Stars and fans" (1973)
- "Talents and Admirers" (1973)
- "Afterthought Had Hit You, Congratulations!" (1976)
- "Duenna" (1978)
- "We Were Chosen by Time" (1978)
- "The Antarctic Novel" (1979)
- "Money Box" (1980)
- "Heart Operation" (1982)
- "Love for Love" (1983)
- "Two Comrades" (1999)

== Recordings (very incomplete list) ==
- Piano Concertos No. 1–3. Tikhon Khrennikov (piano), USSR State Symphony Orchestra, conducted by Yevgeny Svetlanov.
- Piano Concerto No. 4, String Quartet No. 1, Cello Sonata, Songs.
- Symphonies No. 1–3. USSR State Symphony Orchestra, conducted by Yevgeny Svetlanov. Recorded 1973, 1978.
- Iz-za lesa svestitsya (The half-moon shines) and Spi, Natasha, spi, rodnaya (Sleep, Natasha, sleep, my darling) from Into the Storm (opera) Op. 8; Sam ne znayu pochemu (For some unknown reason) from Mother (Khrennikov opera) Op. 13. Daniil Shtoda (tenor), Philharmonia of Russia, Constantine Orbelian. Delos Records 2005

== Interviews ==
Some of Khrennikov's statements mentioned above are included in the 2004 documentary Notes interdites: scènes de la vie musicale en Russie Soviétique (English title: The Red Baton) by Bruno Monsaingeon.

Khrennikov was interviewed by former BBC correspondent Martin Sixsmith for the BBC's 2006 radio show Challenging the Silence. In it Khrennikov denied the suggestion that he was at the heart of the criticism of composers such as Prokofiev and Shostakovich, though he expressed pride that he "was Stalin's Commissar. When I said No! (he shouts), it meant No."

== Recognition ==
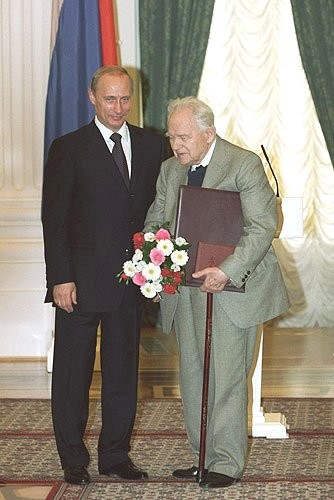
Khrennikov awarded Presidential Prize in the field of Literature and Arts in 2003

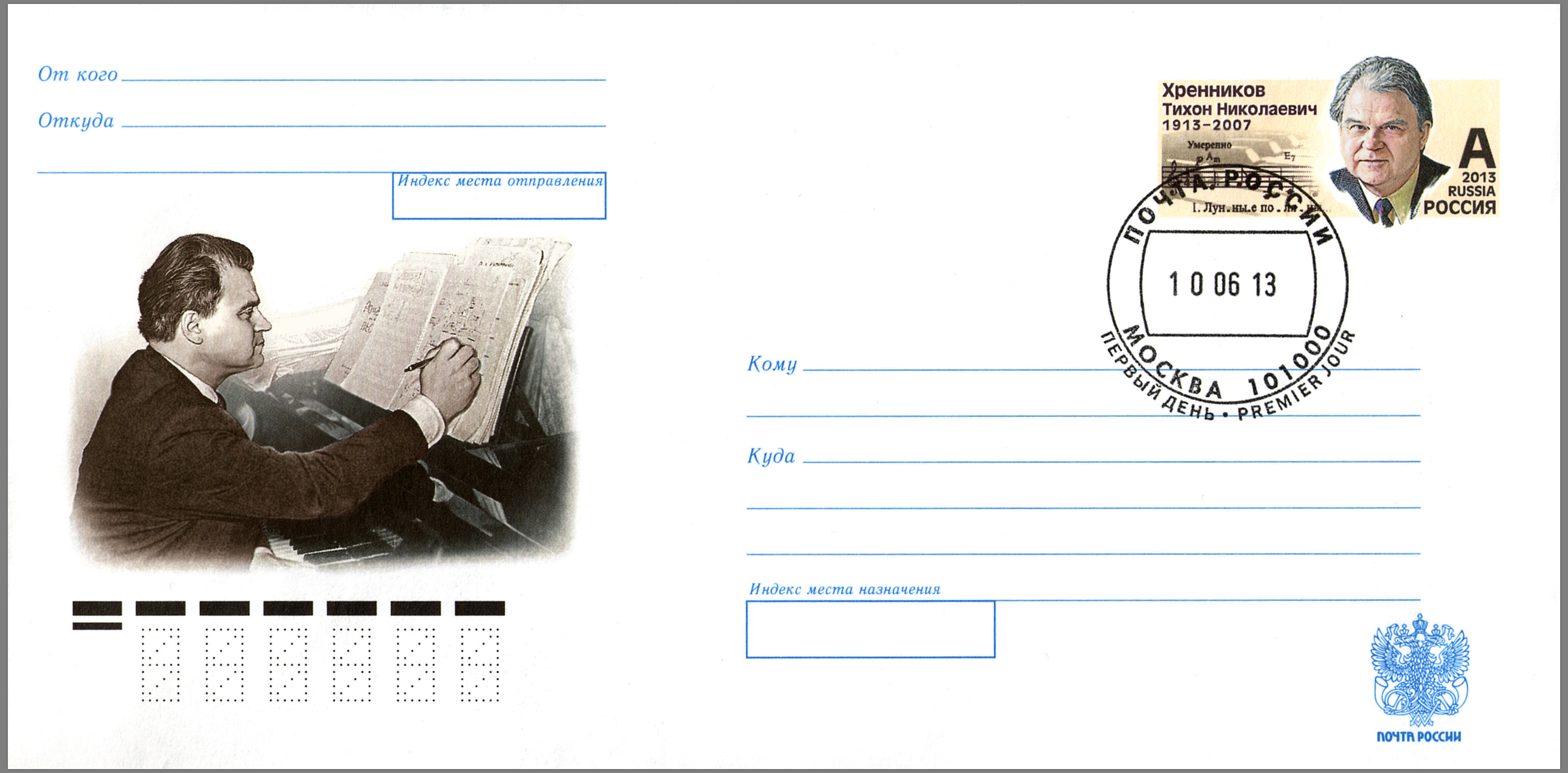
Stamped envelope issued to commemorate the 100th birth anniversary of Tikhon Khrennikov. Russian Post, 2013.

Prizes

- Stalin Prizes:

second degree (1942) – for the music to The Swineherdess and the Shepherd (1941)
second degree (1946) – for the music to Six P.M. (1944)
second degree (1952) – for the music to Donetsk Coal Miners (1950)

- USSR State Prize (1967) – for a series of instrumental concertos (Concerto for Violin and Orchestra, Concerto for Cello and Orchestra)
- Lenin Prize (1974) – for the 2nd Piano Concerto with orchestra
- Glinka State Prize of the RSFSR (1979) – for the 2nd Concerto for Violin and Orchestra
- Prize of the President of the Russian Federation (2003)

Titles

- People's Artist of the USSR (1963)
- People's Artist of the RSFSR (1954)
- Honored Artist of the RSFSR (1950)

Awards

- Hero of Socialist Labour (1973)
- Four Orders of Lenin (1963, 1971, 1973, 1983)
- Order of the Red Banner of Labour, twice (1966, 1988)
- Order of Honour (1998)
- Medal "For Valiant Labour in the Great Patriotic War 1941–1945" (1946)
- Medal "For the Defence of Moscow" (1946)
- Medal "For the Victory over Germany in the Great Patriotic War 1941–1945" (1946)
- Medal "In Commemoration of the 800th Anniversary of Moscow" (1947)
- Jubilee Medal "Twenty Years of Victory in the Great Patriotic War 1941–1945" (1965)
- Jubilee Medal "Thirty Years of Victory in the Great Patriotic War 1941–1945" (1975)
- Jubilee Medal "Forty Years of Victory in the Great Patriotic War 1941–1945" (1985)
- Medal "Veteran of Labour" (1995)
- Jubilee Medal "50 Years of Victory in the Great Patriotic War 1941–1945" (1995)
- Medal "In Commemoration of the 850th Anniversary of Moscow" (1997)
- Jubilee Medal "60 Years of Victory in the Great Patriotic War 1941–1945" (2005)

International awards and titles

- Decoration of Honor Meritorious for Polish Culture (Poland)
- Medal "Friendship of Peoples" (Mongolia)
- Silver Medal of the World Peace Council (1959)
- Order of Saints Cyril and Methodius, 1st class (Bulgaria, 1968)
- Corresponding Member of the German Academy of Arts (GDR East Germany, 1970)
- Medal "25 Years of People's Power" (1970)
- Academician of the Academy Tiberiyskoy (Italy, 1976)
- Prize of the International Music Council of UNESCO (1977)
- Member of "Legion of Gold" (Italy, 1981)
- Medal of Georgi Dimitrov (1882–1982) (Bulgaria, 1982)
- Order of the Friendship of Peoples (GDR, 1983)
- Academician of the Academy of Santa Cecilia (Italy, 1984)
- Order of Merit culture (Romania, 1985)
- Medal of Richard Strauss (GDR, 1985)
- Officer of the Order of Arts and Letters (France, 1994)
- UNESCO Mozart Medal (2003)

== Quotations ==
Khrennikov had to take part in repressions against Shostakovich during the enforcement of the "Party line" in music, but unlike the leadership of the Soviet Writers Union, he was never involved in political reporting on his colleagues.

— K. A. Zalessky, Stalin's Empire: A Biographical Encyclopedic Dictionary

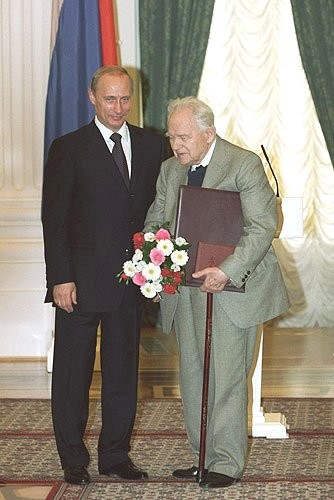
Khrennikov receiving an state prize from Vladimir Putin in 2002

Khrennikov not only survived Stalin's repressive reign but lived in comfort under the succession of Soviet rulers and post-Soviet presidents that followed: Khrushchev, Brezhnev, Andropov, Chernenko, Gorbachev, Yeltsin and Putin. He remains an influential musical figure: he is a professor at the Moscow Conservatory and has been chairman of the Tchaikovsky Competition for the last 25 years. In his native city of Yelets, his home has been turned into a museum and an arts school, and a statue has been erected in his honor. His socialist realist works are regularly performed and his songs remain as popular as ever. Khrennikov's long and improbable career began in 1948, when Stalin personally picked him to lead the Union of Soviet Composers. His first accomplishment on the job was an attack on abstract, "formalist" music in a speech at the First Congress of Composers in 1948, two months after the infamous Resolution of the Central Committee that condemned the "formalism" of Shostakovich, Prokofiev and others. "Enough of these symphonic diaries - these pseudo-philosophic symphonies hiding behind their allegedly profound thoughts and tedious self-analysis," he proclaimed. "Armed with clear party directives, we will stop all manifestations of formalism and popular decadence."

— Vadim Prokhorov, Andante, 24 June 2003

== See also ==
- Khrennikov's Seven
