= Mozart Medal (Frankfurt) =

Award

The Mozart Medal or Mozart-Medaille der Stadt Frankfurt is an award administered by the city of Frankfurt, named after Wolfgang Amadeus Mozart.

== Recipients ==
- Elisabeth Schwarzkopf received this award in 1982
- Mauricio Kagel, 1983
- Junge Deutsche Philharmonie, 1984

== See also ==
- Mozart Medal (disambiguation)
