= Igor Moiseyev =

Soviet dancer (1906–2007)

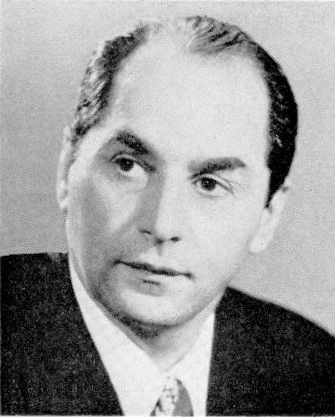
Moiseyev in 1961

Igor Aleksandrovich Moiseyev (Russian: Игорь Александрович Моисеев; 21 January [O.S. 8 January] 1906 – 2 November 2007) was a Soviet and Russian ballet master, dancer, choreographer and pedagogue. Moiseyev was widely acclaimed as the greatest 20th-century choreographer of character dance, a dance style similar to folk dance but with more professionalism and theatrics.

== Life and career ==
Born in Kyiv, Russian Empire (m.d. Ukraine), he was the only child of a Russian lawyer and a French-Romanian seamstress. His family lived in Paris until he was 8, and throughout his life he spoke to Western journalists in fluent French. Moiseyev graduated from the Bolshoi Theatre ballet school in 1924 and danced in the theatre until 1939. His first choreography in the Bolshoi was Footballer in 1930 and the last was Spartacus in 1954.

Since the early 1930s, he staged acrobatic parades on Red Square and finally came up with the idea of establishing the Theatre of Folk Art. In 1936, Vyacheslav Molotov put him in charge of the new dance company, which has since been known as the Moiseyev Ballet. Among about 200 dances he created for his company, some humorously represented the game of football and guerrilla warfare. After visiting Belarus he choreographed a Belarusian "folk" dance Bulba ("Potato"), which over the years indeed became a Belarusian folk dance. According to the Encyclopædia Britannica, Moiseyev's work has been especially admired "for the balance that it maintained between authentic folk dance and theatrical effectiveness".

Moiseyev was named People's Artist of the USSR in 1953, Hero of Socialist Labour in 1976, received the Lenin Prize (1967, for the dance show A Road to the Dance), four Stalin/USSR State Prizes (1942, 1947, 1952, 1985), State Prize of the Russian Federation (1996), was awarded numerous orders and medals of the Soviet Union, Spain and many other countries. On the day of his centenary, Moiseyev became the first Russian to receive Order "For Merit to the Fatherland", 1st class — the highest civilian decoration of the Russian Federation. In 2001, he was awarded the UNESCO Mozart Medal for outstanding contribution to world music culture. He died in Moscow on 2 November 2007 aged 101.

He was married at least twice. In 1940, he married the dancer Tamara Zeifert and his daughter from that marriage, Olga, was a dancer in the Igor Moiseyev Ballet. His grandson, Vladimir Borisovich Moiseyev, was a performer in the Krasnoyarsk National Dance Company of Siberia as of 2015.

Today, the repertoire of the Igor Moiseyev Ballet includes choreographic works by Moiseyev, starting in 1937. Approximately, there are nearly 300 original works of Moiseyev.

== Dances ==
Ballets:

- Polovtsian Dances (music by Alexander Borodin)
- At the skating-rink (music by Johann Strauss)
- Night on Bald Mountain (music by Modest Mussorgsky)
- Spanish ballad (music by Pablo Luna)
- Evening in the Tavern
- Jewish suite "Family joy"

Dance paintings:

- Football
- Guerrillas
- Day on a ship (Engine room, Yablochko)
- Labour Day
- The buffoons (music by Nikolai Rimsky-Korsakov)

and many dances

== Honours and awards ==
Moiseyev with Vladimir Putin at the age of 100

USSR and the Russian Federation

- Hero of Socialist Labour (20 January 1976)
- Three Orders of Lenin (1958, 1976, 1985)
- Order of the October Revolution (1981)
- Order of the Red Banner of Labour, twice (1940, 1966)
- Order of the Badge of Honour (1937)
- Order "For Merit to the Fatherland";
  - 1st class (21 January 2006) – for outstanding contribution to the development of domestic and international choreographic art, many years of creative activity
  - 2nd class (12 June 1999) – for outstanding contribution to cultural development and in connection with the 75th anniversary of creative activity
  - 3rd class (28 December 1995) – for services to the state, an outstanding contribution to the development of choreographic art
- Order of Friendship of Peoples (11 April 1994) – for his great personal contribution to the development of choreographic art and world culture

Foreign

- Order of Saint Alexander with a crown (Bulgaria, 1945)
- Officer of the Order of Culture, 1st class (Hungary, 1954) and 2nd class (1960)
- Officer of the Order of Culture (Hungary, 1989)
- Commander of the Hungarian Order of Merit (1997)
- Commander of the Order of "Citizenship Award" (Spain, 1996)
- Order "Danaker" (Kyrgyzstan, 2007)
- National Order of the Cedar (Lebanon, 1956)
- Order of Sukhbaatar (Mongolia, 1976)
- Order of the Polar Star (Mongolia) (1947)
- Knight's Cross of the Order of Polonia Restituta (Poland, 1946)
- Commander of the Order of Merit of the Republic of Poland (1996)
- Officer of the Order of Culture (Romania, 1945)
- Order of Prince Yaroslav the Wise, 5th class (Ukraine, 3 March 2006) – for outstanding contribution to the development of cultural ties between Ukraine and the Russian Federation, the long-term selfless artistic activity
- Order of Merit, 3rd class (Ukraine, 1999)
- Order of the White Lion, 3rd class (Czechoslovakia, 1980)
- Gold Star of the Order of Brotherhood and Unity (Yugoslavia 1946)
- Commander of the Order of Merit of the Kingdom of Spain (1996)
- UNESCO Mozart Medal
- Order of May (2004)

Award

- Lenin Prize (1967)
- Stalin Prizes first degree (1942, 1952) and second degree (1947)
- USSR State Prize (1985)
- State Prize of the Russian Federation in Literature and Art in 1995 (27 May 1996)

Titles

- People's Artist of the USSR (1953)
- People's Artist of the RSFSR (1944)
- People's Artist of the Moldavian SSR (1950)
- People's Artist of the Kyrgyz SSR (1976)
- Honored Artist of the RSFSR (1942)
- People's Artist of the Buryat ASSR (1940)

Awards
Ovation
Preceded by 2000 Yuri Antonov	Living Legend Award; 2001; Igor Moiseyev	Succeeded by 2002 Aleksandra Pakhmutova

== See also ==
- List of Russian ballet dancers
