= Yulian Semyonov bibliography =

In 1960, reporter Yulian Semyonov became a member of the USSR Union of Writers and after that, actively worked as a writer for almost 30 years. Semyonov achieved a wide renown in the USSR with his novel series, “Political Chronicles” by the common name, united by the principal character, Soviet scout Isaev – Stierlitz. Time Magazine's reporter John Kohan defined him as "the Soviet James Bond". In the USSR (and later in Russia) there were published more than 100 million of this series books. The novels of this cycle were translated into many world languages. Later, in so called “Militia Series” novels (“Petrovka, 38”, “Ogareva, 6”), Semyonov introduced the “police procedural” construction in Soviet literature.

== Early works ==
The story “Diplomatic Agent”, the first noticeable work published, was written in 1958 after the trip to Kabul, where Semyonov was assigned a job as a Pashto and Dari interpreter in 1955.

Semyonov's first fiction works were by no means adventure novels – they were full of romanticism and focussed on ordinary toilers: “Five Stories from Geologist N. N. Ryabinina’s Life” (1958), a short-story cycle about geologists; “Weekdays and Holidays” (1959), a short-story cycle about builders of the taiga mainline; “People Storm the Sky” (1960), collected stories about builders of the East-Siberian mainline; “… On the Official Duty” (1962), a story about polar pilots (which became one of the most noticeable anti-Stalin works published by the “Yunost” magazine at the beginning of the 1960s); “The Rain in the Rainwater Pipes”; “My Heart is in the Mountains”; “Farewell to the Beloved Woman”, and many others.

In 1962 there was published the autobiographical short stories cycle “37-56” (“In the Summer of the Thirty-Seventh”, “The Autumn of the Fifty-Second”, “That Night in Yaroslavl”, “Soldier’s Fate in America”, “The First Day of Freedom”) on the “anti-Stalin” topic. In the end of the 1980s Semyonov got back to these stories and included them into the final edition of “Unwritten Novels”.

== The “Isaev – Stierlitz” Series ==
The series began with the short novel “No Password Needed” (1966). During all further years Semyonov traces from the very beginning the biography of the character created. He appears in 12 works, being written for a period of nearly 25 years.

In 1969 a new novel of the series appeared – “Seventeen Instants of Spring”, a story of a Stierlitz spy work, during 17 days at the very end of World War II, being the base for the similarly-named 12-episode TV series shoot in 1973 by director Tatyana Lioznova. The series evoked people's affection for the image of Stierlitz, acted by Vyacheslav Tikhonov.

Stierlitz played by Tikhonov became at once the popular hero and the main character of many anecdotes (so cаlled Stierlitz jokes). In the Soviet culture his name became common meaning a shrewd, keen in conspiracy, and above all, very lucky person.

The novel and the screenplay gave unprecedented humanity and depth to its Nazi characters. This was helped further by the exceptional performances by the first-rate actors cast in the series. “Stierlitz” is a composite image of various Soviet agents.

The writer himself divided his Stierlitz works into 2 relative subcycles:

- “Alternative” (published as the four-volume edition in 1975 -1978), including such books as “Diamonds for the Dictatorship of the Proletariat”, “No Password Needed”, “Tenderness”, “Spanish Variant”, “Alternative”, “Third Card”, “Major Whirlwind”, “Seventeen Instants of Spring” and “Bomb for the Chairman”;
- “Position” (published as the four-volume edition in 1987), including such books as “Seventeen Instants of Spring” (is included into both subcycles), “The Order to Survive” and “Expansion” (3 parts).

The Isaev – Stierlitz books in succession:

- “Diamonds for the Dictatorship of the Proletariat” (1971) —is about the investigation of the theft from the State Precious Metals and Gems Repository; action is set to take place in Estonian Republic in 1920s;
- “No Password Needed” (novel, 1966)— Cheka embeds a young spy Vladimirov (Isaev) in the White Guard movement in the Far East in 1921–1922;
- “Tenderness” — a story (1975) about the emotional sufferings of Stierlitz in 1927;
- “Spanish Variant” (novel) (1973) — is about Stierlitz's work in Spain in 1938;
- “Alternative” (1974) — the story takes place in Yugoslavia in the spring of 1941;
- “Third Card” (1977) — is about the activities of Hitler agents from the Organization of Ukrainian Nationalists in Ukraine at the beginning of the Great Patriotic War;
- “Major Whirlwind” (1967) — is about Kraków being rescued by the Soviet army during the Great Patriotic War;
- “Seventeen Instants of Spring” (1969) — Isaev – Stierlitz is assigned to learn who of the Nazi leaders is going to hold the separate negotiations concerning the truce with the West;
- “The Order to Survive” (1982) — is about the last days of the Third Reich in the spring of 1945;
- “Expansion I” (1984) — is about Isaev – Stierlitz confrontation with Gehlen in Francoist Spain at the end of the 1940s;
- “Expansion II” (1984) — the action takes place in Spain and Argentina at the end of the 1940s;
- “Expansion III” (1984) — the action takes place in Argentina;
- “Despair” (1990) — the return of spy Isaev to the postwar USSR;
- “Bomb for the Chairman” (1970) — already aged Stierlitz chases the Nazi again (the novel was the base for 3-episode TV series shoot "The Life and Death of Ferdinand Luce"(1976)).

Many novels of this cycle were filmed in the 1960s-80s.

== “Militia Series” ==
In 1963 the first short story dedicated to the Soviet militia daily routine was published, that was “Petrovka, 38”, a story telling about investigation of the theft in the savings bank. The series was continued by the stories “Ogareva, 6” and “Confrontation”. All of them were filmed later on.

In those works Semyonov not only used a captivating storyline, but also introduced the “police procedural” construction in Soviet literature. The main narrative consists of dialogues alternating with the author's meditations and bright characters’ features.

The stories of the “Militia Series” are united by the common main hero figure, a militia colonel Vladislav Kostenko.

- “Petrovka, 38” (1963) —investigation of the theft in the savings bank.
- “Ogareva, 6” (1972) — solving big thefts of the socialistic property at the Pyatigorsk jewel factory and the murder in Moscow.
- “Confrontation” (1979) — investigation of the murders committed by a hiding Nazi criminal.
- “Reporter” (1987) — the detection of the underground syndicate thieving cultural values.
- “The Secret of Kutuzovsky Avenue” (1990) — the inquest concerning Zoya Fyodorova murder.

== Political and historical detectives ==
=== The Series Dedicated to the State Security Apparatus (KGB) ===
Published 1987 by John Calder Ltd. The series novels are united by the principal hero figure, state security colonel Vitaly Slavin.

- “Tass Is Authorized to Announce” (1977, filmed in 1984) — the novel runs about the Soviet counter-espionage activities for catching a CIA agent in Moscow at the end of the 1970s.
- “International Knot” (1986) — narrates about colonel Slavin confrontation with the foreign agent once connected with Oleg Penkovsky.

=== “Autobiographical Series” ===
The works of this series can be united by the main hero figure, journalist Dmitry Stepanov. He is Semyonov's prevailing autobiographical character acting in several works of both “Militia” and “KGB” series (“Tass Is Authorized to Announce”, “International Knot”, “Ogareva, 6”, “Reporter”) and in numerous lyrical short stories (“The Rain in the Rainwater Pipes”, ‘It is not yet autumn”, “Leader” etc.)

Moreover, journalist Stepanov is the principal hero of the following stories and novels:

- “Dunechka and Nikita ” (1965) (the story was filmed in 1966 in the “Not the luckiest day” movie, which is about a complicated worldly situation, the centre of which appeared to be the divorce of the main hero;
- “He Killed Me Near Luang-Prabang ” (1970) (the story was filmed in 1971 in the “Night at the Fourteenth Parallel” movie) —it is a story about war in Vietnam;
- “Press Centre. The Anatomy of Political Crime” (1983) (the novel was filmed in 1988 in the “Big Game” movie)— it is about the putsch in the imaginary country Garivas;
- “Crossings” (1984) — the story is about the destiny of the talented theatre director who established his own theatre;
- “Auction” (1985) (the novel was filmed in 1986 in the “Face to Face” movie) — this is about the searches for the cultural values lost during the war.

In those works the writer trusts his alter- ego, journalist Stepanov, with the social and philosophical meditations from a first-person perspective.

=== Other Political Novels and Stories ===
- “Outcome” (1966) — a movie-essay about the baron Ungern forces defeat in Mongolia in the last days of the Civil War. The literary variant evidently differs from the namesake movie of 1968.
- “Sicilian Capriccioso” (1978) — a documentary story about the adventures of a journalist in Sicily. Later the author transferred the story text into the new edition of “Face to Face” in the form of some chapters dedicated to the mafia relations with fascism.
- “Face to Face” (“The Amber Room Quest”) (1983) — a documentary story about the searches for the cultural values moved abroad from Russia during World War II, carried out by Yulian Semyonov and his foreign friends.
- “Unwritten novels” (1990) — a philippic narrative about the times and morals of Stalin's cult of personality, based on the historical documents, eyewitnesses’ accounts and the author's personal experience.
- “Revelation” — a thrilling “novelette in TV style” (author's definition) about the international drug traffic penetration in the Soviet Union in the first years of the perestroika. It was published in the book “Unknown Yulian Semyonov. Revelation” (2008).
- “Commentary on Skorzeny” — a documentary autobiographical short story about the background of creating the sketch “Skorzeny — Face to Face” (1974). It was intended to be the chapter of the “Unwritten Novels” second part. The story was published in the book “Unknown Yulian Semyonov. Revelation” (2008).
- “Baron” — a documentary short story about Y. Semyonov's and baron Eduard von Falz-Fein's activities in transportation the remains of F.I. Chaliapin to Russia in 1984, was intended to be the chapter of the “Unwritten Novels” second part, then published in the book “Unknown Yulian Semyonov. Revelation” (2008).
- “Three Translations of Omar Cabezas with Commentary” – a documentary narrative about the trip to Nikaragua in 1985. The background of meeting an outstanding Nicaraguan writer and political figure Omar Cabezas alternates with the extracts of his prose, given by Y. Semyonov. The story was published in the book “Unknown Yulian Semyonov. Revelation” (2008).

=== Historical Novels and Stories ===
==== Versions ====
- “Peter's Death” (1982) — a version regarding the death of Peter I.
- “Death of Stolypin” (1983) — about the plot against Pyotr Stolypin.
- “Pseudonym” (1984) — an epistolary novel about the tragic fate of O’Henry.
- “Scientific Commentary” (1985) — a short story about the last days of Vladimir Mayakovsky, named “Suicide” in the first edition.
- “Guchkov Syndrome” (1989) —about the tragic circumstances which led Alexander Guchkov to a suicidal attempt.

==== Novels about Felix Dzerzhinsky ====
“Burning”, a four-volume chronicle novel (1977 — 1987) (filmed in the duology: “Without Distinguishing Features” and “Failure of the ‘Terror’ Operation”, 1978—1980)about Felix Dzerzhinsky life.

- Book I. 1900 – 1904. (1977). The magazine variant is “Dangerous Special Criminal”
- Book II. 1905 – 1906. (1979).
- Book III. 1907 – 1910. (1987). The magazine variant is “Irreconcilability”.
- Book IV. 1911. (1987).

=== Documentary and Journalistic Prose, Travel Prose ===
- “Chung Kuo, Ni Hao!” (1959) — the sketches about China (for children). In co-authorship with N.P. Konchalovskaya.
- “Vietnam. Laos. 1968” (1969) — a sketch-book about the Vietnam War and Laos partisans.
- “Vietnamese Diary” (1971) — about the Vietnam War.
- “Route SP-15 – Borneo” (1971) — travel sketches about the trip to Borneo.
- “Riding a ‘Goat’ after a Wolf” (1974) — sketches, diaries, notes.
- “Return to the Fiesta” (1975) — sketches about Spain and Italy.
- “Encounter” (1977) — political reports, stories, diaries.
- “Business Trips Report” (1986) — the selection from the sketch and travel prose.

=== Collected Stories ===
- “Short Stories” (1966).
- “The Rain in the Rainwater Pipes” (1981)

=== Plays ===
Beginning from the early sixties the writer worked a lot for the theatre. Many of his works of this genre were put on stage in the USSR, and later in Russia, as well as in CIS countries.

- “Truth for 9 Roubles by the Piece” (1961).
- “Children of Fathers” (1962).
- “Go and don’t be Scared” (1963).
- “Petrovka, 38” (1964).
- “Highway to Ursa Major” (1964).
- “Cipher for Blyukher” (1966).
- “Provocation” (1968).
- “Gropingly at Midday” (1969) — in co-authorship with G. Wainer.
- “Ogareva, 6” (1973).
- “Two Faces of Pierre-Auguste de Beaumarchais”.
- “Search-891. Theatre Journalism Experience” (1981).
- “Summary” (1988) —censored, prohibited to be staged and lost.
- “Process-38” (1990).

== Criticism ==
- Montgomery Brower (1987). "In Yulian Semyonov's Thrillers the Villains Are Cia Types—and Some Say the Author Works for the Kgb". People.
- David MacFadyen (2001). Red Stars: Personality and the Soviet Popular Song, 1955-1991. Mcgill Queens. ISBN 978-0-7735-2106-3.
- Klaus Mehnert (1983). The Russians and their Favorite Books. Hoover Institution Press. ISBN 978-0-8179-7821-1.
- Ivan Zasursky (2004). Media and Power in post-Soviet Russia. M.E. Sharpe. ISBN 978-0-7656-0863-5.
- Richard Stites (1992). Russian Popular Culture: Entertainment and Society Since 1900. Cambridge University Press. ISBN 0-521-36214-8.

== Resources ==
- Works by Yulian Semyonov @ Librusek (in Russian)
