= C. B. Oldman =

Cecil Bernard Oldman, CB, CVO, FSA (2 April 1894 – 7 October 1969), published as C. B. Oldman, was an English bibliographer who was Principal Keeper of Printed Books at the British Museum from 1948 to 1959.

== Career ==
Born in London on 2 April 1894, Cecil Bernard Oldman was the son of a builder and contractor, Frederick James Oldman, and his wife Agnes Barnes Nightingale. He attended the City of London School and Exeter College, Oxford. Oldman joined the Printed Books Department at the British Museum in 1920. In 1943, he was appointed the Department's Deputy Keeper and three years later became Keeper, before serving as Principal Keeper from 1948 to 1959. He was also President of the Library Association in 1954. Oldman was elected a Fellow of the Society of Antiquaries of London, and was appointed a Companion of the Order of the Bath in 1953 and a Commander of the Royal Victorian Order five years later. He received honorary degrees from Edinburgh and Sheffield universities in 1956 and 1959 respectively.

Oldman published a number of articles and books about the composer Amadeus Mozart. He died on 7 October 1969, leaving a widow, Sigrid, who was a daughter of Vice-Admiral Adolf Sobieczky and Adele, Baroness Potier des Echelles.
