= Tale of Woe and Misfortune =

17th-century Russian folk tale

The Tale of Woe and Misfortune
- Author: Anonymous
- Original title: Повесть о Горе Злочастии
- Translator: Serge Zenkovsky
- Language: Russian
- Genre: Folk tale
- Publication date: c. 1856
- Publication place: Russia
- Original text: Повесть о Горе Злочастии at Russian Wikisource

The Tale of Woe and Misfortune, also known as Misery-Luckless-Plight, (Russian: Повесть о Горе Злочастии, romanized: Povest' o Gore Zlochastii) is an anonymous Russian folk tale dating from the 17th century. It was discovered by Alexander Pypin in 1856.

== Plot summary ==
The tale begins with a variation on the story of Adam and Eve before introducing the reader to a nameless youth who, having reached "the age of discretion," receives counsel from his parents. His parents advise him not to attend feasts, drink too much, be tempted by beautiful women, fools, or riches, visit taverns, steal or rob, deceive or lie, and last but not least, not to disobey his parents. The youth, ashamed to submit to his father and mother, goes out into the world and ends up gaining much wealth and many friends.

One day, a friend of his tempts him to a tavern and convinces him to drink mead, wine, and beer, promising the youth that he will watch over him and make sure he gets home safely to his parents. The youth drinks the mead, wine, and beer, falling into a drunken slumber. When he wakes up toward night time, he realizes everything he had, including his clothes, have been stolen. He is covered with tavern rags, at his feet lay ragged sandals, and under his head is a brick serving as a pillow.

Being ashamed to return home or to his former friends in such a condition, he travels to another town and comes across a feast. He approaches the merry guests, who welcome him to their festivities. Upset over what has transpired, he is not enjoying himself and the guests notice and ask him what is wrong. After telling them what happened to him, they offer him practical advice and he sets off to another town with their counsel in mind.

He begins to live wisely and acquires even greater wealth than before. At a feast he has organized himself, he begins to boast about his success. Woe (a personification-"spirit") overhears him and threatens the youth not to boast anymore, appears in two of the youth's dreams, and convinces him to spend all his money on drink. Ending up yet again with nothing, he is again ashamed and moves on to the next town.

He comes across a river, and despite Woe's taunting, manages by virtue of a song he sings to have the ferrymen take him across. When the youth decides to return home, Woe gets in his way. The youth then transforms into several different life forms and ends up being able to protect himself from Woe only by entering a monastery, which he does, leaving Woe at the holy gates.

== Historical background ==
The Russian Baroque became a controversial topic of discussion amongst scholars in the 1950s. The 17th and 18th centuries are marked by great upheaval with events such as the Time of Troubles (the period from 1598 – 1613 between death of Tsar Feodor and the establishment of the Romanov dynasty which included civil strife, famine, foreign intervention by Sweden and Poland and five tsars), the Schism of the Russian Church, and the reforms of Peter the Great creating fundamental changes and restructuring of society. This was a time of struggle between the old Russian and the new Western ways that influenced an expansion and transformation within culture and the arts.

== Genre and literary importance ==
The Tale of Woe and Misfortune is one of the key texts in 17th-century Russian literature. Scholars have not come to a consensus as to what genre this tale belongs to, although it is generally considered to belong to what is arguably called the period of the Baroque, which spans the 17th and 18th centuries. Written in blank verse, this tale functions as a reflection of the beginnings of early fiction in old Russian literature and straddles the shift from a society dictated by ecclesiastical authority to one marked by secular trends.

== Interpretations ==
The Tale of Woe and Misfortune was discovered in 1856 by Alexander Pypin in a manuscript collection from the first half of the 18th century. It has been established that it was written in the 17th century and is viewed, along with other works of the time, as a work marking a departure from traditional medieval Russian literature. Possessing the form of a folk epic, the content of this tale-poem has been interpreted in various ways ranging from a narrative of didactic moralism to satirical parody. With a view towards more formal aspects of this work, other scholars have focused on the structure of the tale rather than its message. For example, scholar Gary Cox argues that discussions of what he calls 17th- and 18th-century Russian adventure tales—which constitute the first original prose fiction to have widespread success in Russia—have focused on the use of folkloric motifs, rather than underlying plot structures that resemble folklore. He claims that, in fact, the fairy-tale plot, provides the “skeleton” of most 17th- and 18th-century Russian prose tales. William Harkins, in an essay on this tale, focuses on the portrayal of the protagonist, contrasting the typical superman hero of old Russian literature with the emergence of a new type of hero in the 17th century, which he terms “pathetic.” See Secondary Sources below for in-depth analyses representing a variety of interpretations.

== Translations ==
An English translation is available in Serge A. Zenkovsky's anthology Medieval Russia's Epics, Chronicles and Tales (New York: Meridian, 1974).
