= Hans Sittner =

Austrian musician

Hans Sittner (August 9, 1903 - May 9, 1990) was an Austrian lawyer, music teacher and author, and pianist.

Sittner was born in Linz. He started his music studies in the local Bruckner-Konservatorium in 1914. He finished in 1921. From 1921 to 1925 he studied law at the University of Vienna. In 1927 he graduated from the Vienna Academy of Music, where he had started studying in 1925. In 1946 he was hired as Director of the Academy and in 1949 he also became president. He retained these positions until 1971. Sittner was involved with the Mozartgemeinde Wien, where he established the Wiener Flötenuhr prize. He was president of the Austrian-Romanian Society (Österreichisch-Rumänische Gesellschaft) from 1968 to 1977. He was the first president of the Vienna International Chopin Society (Internationale Chopin Gesellschaft in Wien).

He received a silver Mozarteum Mozart Medal in 1971.

He died in Vienna in 1990.

== Bibliography ==
- Sittner, Hans. Musik Zwischen Natur- Und Geisteswissenschaften: Materialien Und Bibliographie. Doblinger. ISBN 3-900035-56-3.
- Sittner, Hans (1974). Musikerziehung Zwischen Theorie Und Therapie. E. Lafite. ISBN 3-85151-020-8.
- Richard Stöhr Mensch/Musiker/Lehrer, 1965 (Verlag Doblinger, WIEN MUNCHEN)
