= List of people who adopted matrilineal surnames =

This is a list of notable people who have changed, adopted or adjusted their surnames based on a mother's or grandmother's maiden name. Included are people who changed their legal names and people who created personal or professional pseudonyms. Under longstanding Western custom and law, children are customarily given the father's surname, except for children born outside marriage, who often carry their mother's family names. In mediaeval times where a great family died out in the male line, an alternative male heir to the estates was selected as one of the younger sons of a daughter, who was required by the bequest to adopt, by royal licence, in lieu of his patronymic, his maternal surname and coat of arms for himself and his descendants. This was also the origin of double-barrelled surnames, where the paternal surname was partially retained, or resurrected by a later generation. The compliance with the terms of the bequest was essential to avoid challenge by another potential heir in the lawcourts. In the 1970s some women began to adopt their mother's maiden name as their legal surnames. People in Sweden have recently begun adopting maternal line surnames in an effort to broaden the number of last names in the country. Such practices add considerable difficulties to the study of genealogy and family history.

== Stage names ==
Many actors and other entertainers elect to add or include their mothers' maiden names in their adopted stage names. The book How to be a Working Actor: The Insider's Guide to Finding Jobs in Theater, Film, and Television advises aspiring performers to consider changing their names, noting that "if [your birth name] is difficult to spell, pronounce, or remember, it may not be the name you want for your professional career." It goes on to suggest: "If you want to retain a connection to your family, try using your mother's maiden name or the name of a revered relative."

A person's mother's maiden name is used by many financial institutions as a key piece of information to validate a customer's identity. In 2005, researchers showed that the common practice of using a mother's maiden name as the basis for a stage name could be exploited to entice people to reveal that name and other details that could allow fraudsters to steal their identities. Researchers asked a random sample of people on London streets a series of questions, beginning with "What is your name?" They then engaged in conversation about theatre, asked people if they knew how actors choose their stage names, then told them that stage names were typically a combination of the name of a pet and the mother's maiden name. Next the participants were asked what their stage names would be; 94% responded by revealing both their mother's maiden name and a pet's name.

== List ==
=== A ===
- Janet Achurch, British actress, was born Janet Sharp; her mother died during childbirth and she was reared by her father William Prior Sharp, an insurance agent. She later adopted her maternal grandparents' surname (Achurch) as her professional name.
- Edie Adams, American actress and singer, was born Edith Elizabeth Enke to Sheldon Alonzo Enke and his wife, Ada Dorothy (née Adams), later adopting her mother's maiden name as her professional name.
- Maude Adams, American actress, was born Maude Ewing Kiskadden (or Maude Ewing Adams Kiskadden) and adopted her mother's maiden name of Adams as her stage name.
- András Adorján, Hungarian author and chess grandmaster; born as András Jocha (or Jocha András), he adopted his mother's maiden name, Adorján, at the age of 18, in 1968.
- Theodor Adorno, German sociologist, philosopher and musicologist known for his critical theory of society, was born Theodor Ludwig Wiesengrund to Oscar Alexander Wellington (1870–1946) and Maria Calvelli-Adorno della Piana (1865–1952). His mother wanted her son's paternal surname to be supplemented by the addition of her own surname/maiden name, Adorno. His earliest publications carried the name Theodor Wiesengrund-Adorno. Upon his application for United States citizenship, his name was modified to Theodor W. Adorno. He was also sometimes known by such aliases as Theodor Ludwig Adorno-Wellington and Theodor Ludwig Adorno-Wiesengrund before becoming a U.S. citizen.
- Ahn Jung-hwan, South Korean former football player and television personality.
- Priscilla Ahn, American singer-songwriter, was born Priscilla Natalie Hartranft. For her career, Ahn adopted her Korean mother's maiden name.
- Clay Aiken, American singer-songwriter, was born Clayton Holmes Grissom. Estranged from his birth father, Vernon Grissom, and with the permission of his mother (Faye Aiken Grissom) and his maternal grandfather (Alvis Aiken), Clay legally changed his surname from Grissom to Aiken at the age of 19.
- Anna Akhmatova, Russian poet, born Anna Andreyevna Gorenko, adopted her great-grandmother's maiden name after her father objected to her vocation and called her writings "decadent" and did not want to see any verses printed under his "respectable" name.
- Svetlana Alliluyeva, daughter of Joseph Stalin, began using her mother's surname after her father's death in 1953.
- Clarence Ashley, American singer and musician, also known as Tom Ashley and Thomas Ashley, was born Clarence Earl McCurry in Bristol, Tennessee in 1895, the only child of George McCurry and Rose-Belle Ashley. Shortly before Clarence was born, Rose-Belle's father, Enoch Ashley, discovered that his son-in-law George was an adulterer. George was forced to leave town. Rose-Belle moved back in with her father. As he was raised by the parents of his mother, the name "McCurry" was dropped in favor of "Ashley".
- Susan Ashton, American contemporary Christian musician, was born Susan Rae Hill, but elected to use her mother's maiden name as her professional surname to distinguish herself from another contemporary Christian singer, Kim Hill.
- Michael Ayrton, English artist and writer, was born Michael Gould. For professional purposes, he adopted his mother (Barbara Ayrton-Gould)'s maiden name.

=== B ===
- Jean Babilée, French ballet dancer and choreographer, was originally named Jean Gutmann but adopted his mother's maiden name for professional use.
- Lauren Bacall, American actress, was born Betty Joan Perske. After her parents divorced when she was a young child, she assumed her maternal grandmother's surname (also her mother's maiden name) of Bacal. She later added a second "l" to make the pronunciation clearer.
- Herbert Baker, American songwriter and screenwriter, was born Herbert Joseph Abrahams, to Belle Baker (born Bella Becker) and Maurice Abrahams. He later changed his surname and adopted that of his mother. He and she shared the same birthdate (December 25).
- Antonio Banderas, Spanish actor, was born José Antonio Domínguez Banderas. He dropped his first (paternal) surname (Domínguez), electing to use his second surname (his mother's maiden name, Banderas) as his acting name.
- Edith Barrett, American actress, born Edith Williams, adopted her mother's maiden name as her professional name. She was the granddaughter of Lawrence Barrett.
- Sir Brian Batsford, British painter, designer, publisher and Conservative Party politician, was originally named Brian Cook and used that name for his early artwork and in his first electoral candidacy. In June 1946, when he was 35 years old, he adopted his mother's maiden name of Batsford for business reasons at the request of an uncle. He sometimes joked that "Brian Cook ceased to exist" after World War II.
- Richard Bebb, English actor, born Richard Bebb Williams, he was obliged to change his surname (Williams) to avoid confusion with another player, and elected to use "Bebb", his mother's maiden name.
- Beck, born Bek David Campbell; now known as Beck Hansen. Adopted his mother's maiden name (Hansen) after his father was estranged from the family.
- Christine Belford (a.k.a. Christina Belford), American actress, was born Christine Riley in Amityville, Long Island, New York to Joseph J. Riley and Mary Belford Riley (née Wilson; later Malone), who later divorced. The actress adopted her mother's middle name (Belford), a family name, as her professional surname.
- Peter Benenson, English activist, was born Peter James Henry Solomon in London to a Jewish family. He was the only son of Harold Solomon and Flora Benenson, Peter Benenson adopted his mother's maiden name later in life, reportedly in tribute to his maternal grandfather, the Russian financier Grigori Benenson (1860–1939), following the latter's death.
- David Benioff, American writer, was born David Friedman in New York City; he changed his surname to Benioff, his mother's maiden name.
- Robby Benson, American actor, was born Robin David Segal in Dallas, Texas, the son of Freda Ann (née Benson), a singer, actress, and business promotions manager, and Jerry Segal, a writer. He was raised in New York City and took his mother's maiden name as his stage name when he was 10 years old.
- Jeannie Berlin, American actress, born Jeannie Brette May, to Marvin and Elaine (née Berlin) May.
- Sara Berner, American actress, born Lillian Ann Herdan, to Sam and Sarah Herdan. She adopted her mother's first name and maiden name as her stage name.
- Wolfgang Bernhard, German businessman. Born Wolfgang Ayerle, he later took his mother's maiden name as his professional name.
- Regina Bianchi, Italian actress, born Regina D'Antigny, the daughter of two theater actors. She adopted, professionally, the surname of her paternal grandmother.
- Neil and Peter Billingsley, American actors, directors, and producers, born to Alwin Michaelsen, a financial consultant and Gail Billingsley, a niece of Stork Club owner Sherman Billingsley; the brothers have been known, alternatively, as Neil Billingsley-Michaelsen and Peter Billingsley-Michaelsen.
- Aitana Bonmatí i Conca, Catalan football player; born to Vicent Conca i Ferràs and Rosa Bonmatí Guidonet, she took her mother's last name as the first one as per their decision on birth.
- Yelena Bonner, Soviet dissident and human rights activist, was born Lusik Georgievna Alikhanova to Georgy Alikhanov and Ruf Bonner, but changed her first name and chose to keep her mother's maiden name as her own surname through two marriages and until her death.
- Bimba Bosé, born Eleonora Salvatore González, Italian-born Spanish model, actress and singer, daughter of Spaniard Lucía González Bosé and her Italian first husband, Alessandro Salvatore. Her maternal grandmother was actress Lucia Bosé.
- Patricia Bosworth, American journalist, biographer and former actress and model, was born Patricia Crum in Oakland, California, the daughter of writer Anna Gertrude Bosworth and attorney Bartley Crum.
- Margaret Bourke-White, American photographer who was born Margaret White. In 1927, following a brief, failed marriage, she adopted her mother's maiden name ("Bourke") as part of her new hyphenated name, Bourke-White.
- Stephen Boyd, Northern Irish actor; born William Millar, he adopted his mother's maiden name as his professional surname.
- Jacqueline Boyer, French singer and actress, was born Jacqueline Ducos, the daughter of performers Jacques Pills (né René Jacques Ducos) and Lucienne Boyer, and adopted her mother's maiden name as her professional name.
- René Boylesve, French author whose birth name was René Marie Auguste Tardiveau, used his mother's maiden name in his pen name.
- Hercules Brabazon Brabazon, English artist, was born Hercules Brabazon Sharpe and adopted his mother's maiden name as his surname to inherit a family estate.
- Klaus Maria Brandauer was born Klaus Georg Steng (or Stenj), the son of Maria Brandauer and Georg Steng (or Georg Stenj). He subsequently adapted his mother's maiden name as his professional name.
- Pierre Brasseur, French actor, was born to actors Georges Espinasse and Germaine Brasseur. He adopted his mother's name as his professional surname. His grandfather, Jules Brasseur, was an actor as well. The family tradition of using the surname Brasseur was continued by Pierre's son, Claude, and Pierre's grandson Alexandre.
- Lisa Brenner, American actress, was born Lisa Dawn Goldstein, the daughter of Gloria (née Brenner), a dental assistant, and Harry Goldstein, a dentist. She adopted her mother's maiden name as her professional surname.
- Sir Francis Buller-Yarde-Buller, 2nd Bt. of Churston Court, British aristocrat, born to Sir Francis Buller and his wife, Susanna (née Yarde), he incorporated his mother's maiden name into his own. His own son and heir, John, changed the surname to Yarde-Buller, dropping the first "Buller", and the name has remained in this form ever since.
- Anthony Burgess, English writer, teacher and composer, born John Anthony Burgess Wilson to Joseph and Elizabeth (née Burgess) Wilson; he adopted his mother's maiden name as his professional name when he became a published author.
- Edd Byrnes, American actor, was born Edward Byrne Breitenberger. When he was 13 his father died. After this, he adopted a new surname (and future stage name) by altering his middle name "Byrne" in favor of "Byrnes", his mother's maiden name—the name of his maternal grandfather, a fireman.

=== C ===
- Christian Camargo, American actor and director, was born Christian Minnick in New York City, the son of actress Victoria Wyndham and grandson of actor Ralph Camargo. He adopted his mother's maiden name professionally.
- Helen Stuart Campbell, American social reformer and pioneer in the field of home economics, was born Helen Stuart, but made "Stuart" her middle name, adopting her mother's maiden name (Campbell) as her surname, for reasons which are unclear.
- Denis Cannan, British dramatist, playwright and script writer, was born Harold Denis Pullein-Thompson, the son of Captain Harold J. Pullein-Thompson and novelist Joanna Cannan, he later adopted his mother's maiden name as his own.
- Diana Canova, American actress, was born Diane Canova Rivero, the daughter of actress Judy Canova (née Juliette Canova) and musician Filberto Rivero. She adopted her mother's surname as her professional name.
- Bobby Capó, Puerto Rican-American singer-songwriter musician, born Félix Manuel Rodríguez. Born in Coamo, Puerto Rico, he adopted his stage name (Rodríguez is a common Hispanic surname, so he reportedly opted to use his mother's less common one, Capó, instead), and migrated to New York City early in the 1940s.
- Barbara Carrera, Nicaraguan-American model and socialite, was born Barbara Kingsbury in 1945 in San Carlos, Nicaragua. Her mother, Doña Florencia Carrera, was a native of Nicaragua, and her father, Louis Kingsbury, was an American employee of the United States embassy in Nicaragua. She changed her last name to her mother's surname after beginning her career as a model with the Eileen Ford agency.
- Igor and Oleg Cassini, born Igor Cassini Loiewski and Oleg Cassini Loiewski, respectively. Igor, the younger brother (1915–2002) was an American syndicated gossip columnist for the Hearst newspaper chain. Oleg, the elder brother (1913–2006), was a well-known American fashion designer. Both brothers adopted the maiden name of their mother, Countess Marguerite Cassini, an aristocrat of Russian and Italian descent.
- Leo Castelli, American art dealer, acquired his mother's maiden name of "Castelli", in place of his birth name of "Krausz" or "Krauss", as a child, when his birth city of Trieste was transferred from Austrian to Italian control.
- Cristian Castro, born Cristian Sáinz Valdés, is a Mexican singer who adopted his surname after his mother actress and singer Verónica Castro.
- Alexander "Sandy" Chaplin, American actor, was born Alexander Gaberman. He and his wife Daisy (Harold Prince's daughter) changed their surnames to Daisy's mother (Judith Chaplin)'s name.
- Francis Charteris, 7th Earl of Wemyss, a Scottish peer, was the second son of James Wemyss, 5th Earl of Wemyss and his wife Janet, the daughter of Colonel Francis Charteris, whose surname Francis Wemyss adopted on 24 February 1732, legally changing his name to Francis Wemyss Charteris, upon inheriting the estates of his maternal grandfather.
- Chen Lijun, Chinese weightlifter.
- Chris Cornell, American rock musician and singer (Soundgarden, Audioslave) was born Christopher John Boyle. Following their parents' divorce, he and his siblings changed their surnames from Boyle to their mother's maiden name (Cornell).
- Constance Cummings, American-born British actress, was born Constance Halverstadt, the daughter of Dallas Vernon Halverstadt, a lawyer, and his wife, Kate Logan Cummings, a concert soprano.
- Peggy Cummins, Irish actress, born Augusta Margaret Diane Fuller in Prestatyn, Denbighshire, Wales, where she was born because her Irish parents happened to be there and a storm kept them from returning to their home in Dublin for her birth. Her mother was an actress in her own right, Margaret Cummins (1889–1973), whose name Peggy adopted as her own professionally.
- Louise Currie, American actress, was born in Oklahoma City, Oklahoma, the daughter of Charles W. Gunter, a banker, and his wife, Louise (née Currie), whose maiden name she would take for her professional acting surname.
- Peter Theo Curtis, American journalist and released hostage, was born Peter Theophilus Eaton Padnos in Atlanta, Georgia to Michael Padnos and Nancy Curtis; he adopted his mother's surname after his parents separated.

=== D ===
- Ion Hartulari Darclée, Romanian composer, son of the celebrated Romanian operatic soprano Hariclea Darclée, also known as Hariclea Hartulari-Darclée, adopted his mother's maiden name which he added to his father's surname to create a compound surname.
- Jeremy Davies, American actor, born Jeremy Boring. He adopted his mother's maiden name as his professional name when he began acting.
- Patti Davis, American actress and daughter of President Ronald Reagan, born Patricia Ann Reagan, began using her mother's maiden name of "Davis" while she was a university student. In 2009, she told interviewer Tavis Smiley that she "had that famous kid thing of I just want my own identity" and that she chose her mother's maiden name for her new name "because I really didn't want to anger my parents."
- Bill de Blasio, born Warren Wilhelm Jr., is an American activist and politician. He was sworn in as the 109th Mayor of New York City on January 1, 2014. He was born to Warren and Maria (née de Blasio) Wilhelm in 1961 in Manhattan. His father was of German descent, and his maternal grandparents, Giovanni and Anna, were Italian immigrants. His family always called him "Bill" and he legally changed his name in 2001 to Bill de Blasio.
- Chris de Burgh, Anglo-Irish singer-songwriter, born Christopher John Davison in Venado Tuerto, Argentina, to Colonel Charles Davison, a British diplomat, and Maeve Emily de Burgh, a native of Ireland; he later adopted his mother's maiden name as his professional surname.
- Yvonne De Carlo, Canadian-American actress and singer, was born Margaret Yvonne Middleton. She was not yet three years old when her father abandoned the family. Left on her own, her mother returned to using her maiden name, Marie De Carlo, and the actress later took "De Carlo" for her own career.
- Elvira de Hidalgo, Spanish operatic soprano, was born Valderrobres, Teruel Province, Spain as Elvira Juana Rodríguez Roglán, daughter of Pedro Rodríguez Hidalgo and Miguela Roglán Bel. Elvira adopted her paternal grandmother's surname as her professional name.
- Albert Dekker, American actor, was born Albert Van Ecke in Brooklyn, New York; he adopted his mother's maiden name of Dekker as his stage name.
- Paco de Lucía, Spanish guitar player, was born Francisco Gustavo Sánchez Gomes. "In the documentary Paco de Lucía - Light and Shade: A Portrait, he tells how, when he was playing in the streets as a young boy, there were many Pacos and Pablos in Andalusia taking this into consideration and ... [he] ... wanted to honor [his] Portuguese mother Lucia [Lúcia] Gomes, Paco took his stage name Paco de Lucía".
- Pepe de Lucía, born José Sánchez Gomes, Spanish flamenco singer and songwriter. One of the five children born to flamenco guitarist Antonio Sánchez Pecino and his Portuguese wife, Lúcia Gomes, Pepe, like his brother, Paco, adopted his professional name to honor their mother.
- Catherine Deneuve, French actress, was born Catherine Fabienne Dorléac. When she was to appear in a movie with her elder sister, Françoise Dorléac, she adopted the surname of her mother, actress Renée Simonot (born Jeanne Renée Deneuve) to distinguish herself from her sister.
- Joe DeRita, American actor and comedian best known as a member of The Three Stooges, was born Joseph Wardell. He took his mother's maiden name when he joined the burlesque circuit during the 1920s.
- Tamara Desni, born Tamara Brodsky, was a German-born British actress, the daughter of actress Xenia Desni. She adopted her mother's surname.
- Patrick Dewaere, born either Patrick Jean Marie Henri Bourdeaux or Jean-Marie Patrick Bourdeau, and known professionally as Patrick Maurin, he finally opted for the stage surname Dewaere, which was his grandmother's maiden name.
- Xavier Dolan, Canadian actor, director and screenwriter; the son of Quebec actor Manuel Tadros and Geneviève Dolan, a teacher; he adopted his mother's maiden name as his professional name.
- Arielle Dombasle, American actress; born Arielle Laure Maxime Sonnery de Fromental, to Jean-Louis Melchior Sonnery de Fromental, a silk manufacturer, and his wife, Francion Garreau-Dombasle. The Dombasle surname came into existence in 1912, when Arielle's grandfather, René Sonnery (1887–1925), an industrialist from Lyon, married Anne-Marie Berthon du Fromental. In memory of her mother who died at the age of 36, Arielle took the pseudonym Arielle Dombasle.
- Melvyn Douglas, American actor; born Melvyn Edouard Hesselberg to Lena Priscilla (née Shackelford) and Edouard Gregory Hesselberg, he adopted his maternal grandmother's maiden name (Douglas) as his professional and legal name.
- Eddie Dowling, American actor and producer, was born Joseph N. Goucher; he adopted the maiden name of his mother (Bridget Mary Dowling) as his stage surname.
- Brian Doyle-Murray, American actor, voice artist, comedian and screenwriter; born as Brian Murray, Doyle is his grandmother's maiden name, which he added to his surname by hyphenation as there was already an actor known as Brian Murray (born Brian Bell).
- Charlie Drake, British actor and comedian, was born Charles Edward Springall in Elephant and Castle, Southwark. He later took his mother's maiden name for the stage and, later, television and film, achieving success as a comedian.
- Genevieve Driscoll, born Alma Genevieve Rubens to a Jewish father and a Catholic mother, she became a silent film actress known as Alma Rubens. Some biographies erroneously state that her birth name was Genevieve Driscoll, however, that name was a pseudonym that she later used in a non-professional capacity (Genevieve was her middle name and Driscoll was her maternal grandmother's maiden name).
- Zélia Duncan, born Zélia Cristina Gonçalves Moreira, is a Brazilian singer and composer. She adopted the surname "Duncan" (her mother's maiden name) professionally.
- Michael Dunn, born Gary Neil Miller, he changed his surname to Dunn (his maternal grandmother's maiden name) as there was already one performer in the actor's union with the name Gary Miller; it is unknown why he changed his first name to Michael.
- Shaila Dúrcal, born Shaila de los Ángeles Morales de las Heras, the daughter of Spanish singer Rocío Dúrcal and Filipino singer, Antonio Morales, known professionally as Junior Morales. Shaila adopted her mother's professional surname (Dúrcal) as her own, professionally if not legally.
- Judith Durham, born Judith Mavis Cock, Australian singer who was the lead singer of the Australian folk-influenced pop group the Seekers; she adopted the maiden name of her mother (Hazel Durham) as her stage surname.

=== E ===
- Biddy Early, Irish herbalist, accused by some of being a witch, was born in County Clare and baptised Bridget Ellen Connors. Her parents were John Thomas Connors, a poor farmer, and his wife Ellen (née Early). She later adopted her mother's maiden name and was known as Biddy (a nickname for Bridget) Early for most of her life.
- John Elwes, English politician (birth name "Meggot") was born on 7 April 1714 into a respectable English family. His father, Robert Meggot, was a respected Southwark brewer and his grandfather was Sir George Meggot, MP for that same borough. His mother, Amy (née Elwes), was the granddaughter of Sir Gervase Elwes, 1st Baronet and MP for Suffolk (see Elwes baronets).
- Aaron and Ethan Embry, American songwriter/record producer and actor brothers — born Ethan Philan Randall and Aaron Randall, respectively, they adopted the maiden name of their mother, Karen Embry, a screenwriter and talent manager.

=== F ===
- Maude Fealy (1883–1971), actress, was born as Maude Mary Hawk in Memphis, Tennessee; her mother was actress/acting coach Margaret Fealy.
- Felix Fibich, Polish-born American actor, dancer, choreographer and teacher, born Fajwel Goldblatin in 1917 in Warsaw, Poland (then part of Imperial Russia). He adopted Fibich, his maternal grandmother's surname, as his professional name.
- Ruth Fischer (1895–1961), co-founder of the Austrian Communist Party in 1918, was born Elfriede Eisler in Leipzig, the daughter of Rudolf Eisler, a professor of philosophy, and his wife, Marie (née Fischer). According to secret information declassified in 2010, she was a key agent of the American intelligence service known as "The Pond".
- Tara Fitzgerald, British actress, born Anne Tara Callaby in Cuckfield, Sussex to Irish portrait photographer Sarah Geraldine Fitzgerald and English artist Michael Callaby. When she was still a child her family moved to Freeport, Bahamas, where her maternal grandfather, David Fitzgerald, practised law. Her parents divorced after returning to England when Tara was three years old; she uses her mother's surname.
- Margot Fonteyn, British ballerina, was born Margaret Hookham. Her stage name, which she first used when she made her professional debut at the age of 15, was adapted from her first name and her mother's maiden name.
- Brenda and Ralph Forbes, British-born American stage and film actors (siblings) were born to E. J. Taylor and actress Mary Forbes; they adopted their mother's surname professionally.
- J.D. Fortune (aka Jason Dean Fortune), Canadian rock singer and songwriter; born Jason Dean Benninson, he adopted his mother's maiden name as his own surname.
- Anthony Franciosa, American actor, was born Anthony George Papaleo to Italian-American parents; raised by his mother and aunt, he adopted his mother's maiden name (Franciosa) as his professional name.
- Victoria Fyodorova was a Russian-American actress and author. She was born shortly after World War II to U.S. Admiral Jackson Tate (1898–1978) and Russian actress Zoya Fyodorova (1909–1981); the couple had had a brief affair before Tate was expelled from Moscow by Joseph Stalin. She wrote the 1979 book, The Admiral's Daughter about her experience attempting to reunite with her father.

=== G ===
- Troy Garity, American actor and social activist, born Troy O'Donovan Hayden, is the son of Jane Fonda and Tom Hayden. His professional surname, Garity, is the maiden name of his paternal grandmother.
- Elizabeth Garner, Scottish-born Dominica-based writer, socialite and politician, was born Elma Gordon-Cumming, the eldest of five siblings born to Sir William Gordon-Cumming and his wife, Florence Josephine (née Garner; 1870–1922). She adopted her mother's maiden name (Garner) as a pen name.
- David Garrett, German classical violinist, was born David Bongartz, the son of a German jurist and an American prima ballerina; he later adopted his mother's maiden name as his own.
- Theodor Geisel, American writer, based his pen name of Dr. Seuss on his middle name, which was his mother's maiden name (Henrietta Seuss).
- Troy Gentile, American actor (The Goldbergs), born Troy Francis Farshi, adopted his mother (Debbie Gentile)'s maiden surname.
- Ryan Giggs, Welsh footballer, was born Ryan Joseph Wilson, but at age 16 legally adopted his mother's maiden name as his professional surname.
- Cherie and Mark Gil, Filipino acting siblings, born Evangeline Rose Gil Eigenmann and Raphael Joseph De Mesa Eigenmann, respectively. The children of actors Eddie Mesa and Rosemarie Gil, Cherie and Mark adopted their mother's maiden name professionally.
- Bartholomew Gill, Irish-American writer, was born Mark C. McGarrity; he adopted his maternal grandfather's name as his pen name.
- John Gilroy, for whom the town of Gilroy, California is named, was born John Cameron. After deserting from his ship, the Isaac Todd, in Monterey, California, in 1814, he adopted his mother's maiden name as his own in an ultimately successful ruse to avoid being retaken. When he later was received into the Roman Catholic faith, he was baptized as Juan Bautista María Gilroy.
- Paulette Goddard, American film actress, born with the surname Levy, she adopted her mother (Alta Goddard)'s maiden name professionally.
- Gale Gordon, American actor, was born Charles Thomas Aldrich Jr., in New York City to American vaudevillian Charles Thomas Aldrich and his wife, English actress Gloria Gordon; he adopted his mother's professional surname "Gordon" (her professional name; she was born Bertha St Leger Palliser Wilson), when he became an actor himself.
- Ariana Grande, American singer, was born Ariana Grande-Butera, choosing her matriname to be her stage name.
- Peter Graves, American actor, born Peter Duesler Aurness, chose his stage name to honor his mother's family and so he did not get confused with James Arness, the stage name of his elder brother.
- Glen Gray, American jazz saxophonist and bandleader, was born, most likely in Roanoke, Illinois, to Lurdie P. Knoblauch and Agnes Gray. His father was a lifelong railroad worker who died when Glen was two years of age. His widowed mother married George H. DeWilde.

=== H ===
- Cosmo Hamilton, English playwright and novelist, was the pen name of Henry Charles Hamilton Gibbs, aka Cosmo Gibbs, an English playwright and novelist whose mother's maiden name was Hamilton.
- David Hamilton, British radio and TV presenter, was born David Pilditch, but took up his mother's maiden name as his surname after he was advised that his real name would be difficult for audiences to remember.
- Jean Harlow, American actress, was born Harlean Harlow Carpenter; Jean Harlow had been her mother's maiden name.
- Samantha Harris, American model, and television presenter/personality. Born Samanthan Harris Shapiro; she adopted her mother's maiden name (Harris) as her professional name.
- Lilian Harvey, English-born actress and singer, who spent many years in Germany, was born Helene Lilian Muriel Pape. Her mother was English and her father was a German businessman. She began her career by attending the dance and voice school of the Berlin State Opera, later adopting her maternal grandmother's maiden name (Harvey) as her professional name.
- Rita Hayworth, American actress and dancer, was born Margarita Carmen Cansino and appeared in her first 10 movies under the name Rita Cansino. Subsequently, under the tutelage of her first husband and manager, she altered her physical appearance and adopted the maiden name of her mother (Volga Hayworth) so as to no longer be perceived solely as an exotic or ethnic Latina.
- Mlle Hervez, French actress; born Geneviève Béjart, she later adopted a variation of her mother's maiden name (Hervé) as her stage name.
- Dana Hill, American film, television and voice actress; born Dana Lynne Goetz, she adopted her mother's maiden name (Hill) as her professional acting name in the 1970s to avoid the appearance of nepotism as her father worked in the entertainment industry.
- Marianna Hill, American film and television actress; born as Marianna Schwarzkopf, to architect Frank Schwarzkopf and writer Mary Hawthorne Hill. She adopted her mother's maiden surname as her professional surname.
- Sir Bernard Hogan-Howe, QPM, Commissioner of Police of the Metropolis (of London; as of 2012); former Chief Constable of the Merseyside Police, former Assistant Commissioner of the Metropolitan Police, and one of Her Majesty's Inspectors of Constabulary. Hogan-Howe was born in Sheffield in 1957, the son of Bernard Howe. He was brought up by his mother, whose maiden name (Hogan) he later added by Deed poll.
- Lyndsie Holland, English actress and singer, born Margaret Foster. She took her stage name from her two maternal grandmothers.
- Hua Chunying, Chinese diplomat, the spokesperson of China, and the director of the Foreign Ministry Information Department of China.
- Olivia Hussey, British actress, was born Olivia Osuna in Buenos Aires, Argentina to Joy Alma (née Hussey), a British legal secretary, and Andrés Osuna (aka Osvaldo Ribó), an Argentine musician; the couple divorced when Olivia was two years old.

=== I ===
- Peter Igelhoff, Austrian pianist, light music and film composer/arranger, and entertainer, was born Rudolf August Ordnung on 22 July 1904 in Vienna. He changed his forename and took his mother's maiden name as his surname after he resolved on a career in music. He died on 8 April 1978, aged 73, in Bad Reichenhall.
- Frieda Inescort (born Frieda Wrightman), Scottish film and stage actress, who adopted her mother (actress Elaine Inescort)'s surname as her own professional name.

=== J ===
- Joyce Jameson, American actress, singer and comedian, was born Joyce Beverly Kingsley. According to the Cook County, Illinois Birth Index, 1916-1935, her mother's maiden name was Jameson, which she later adopted professionally.
- Ernst Jansen Steur (born Ernst Nicolaas Herman Jansen; 24 October 1945), is a Dutch former neurologist, who garnered notoriety for misconduct in both the Netherlands and Germany, and lost his license to practice medicine.
- Anne Jeffreys, American actress and singer, was born Annie Jeffreys Carmichael; she adopted her mother (Kate McDonald Jeffreys)'s maiden name professionally.
- Norah Jones, American singer-songwriter, was born Geethali Norah Jones Shankar to Indian sitar player Ravi Shankar and concert producer Sue Jones; she changed her name at the age of 16.
- Penny Jordan, née Penelope Jones, aka Annie Groves, was a best-selling and prolific English writer of over 200 romance novels. She started writing regency romances as Caroline Courtney, and wrote contemporary romances as Penny Jordan and historical romances as Annie Groves (her mother's maiden name).
- Louis Jourdan, French actor, was born as Louis Robert Gendre in Marseille, the son of Yvonne (née Jourdan) and Henry Gendre.
- Ashley Judd, American actress and political activist, was born Ashley Tyler Ciminella, the daughter of Naomi Judd, a country music singer and motivational speaker, and Michael Charles Ciminella, a marketing analyst for the horseracing industry.

=== K ===
- Teruyuki Kagawa, Japanese actor, kabuki actor and boxing commentator. His parents divorced in 1968 and his mother was given the custody of him.
- Garry Kasparov, Russian chess champion, was born Garry Kimovich Weinstein in the former Azerbaijan SSR to an Armenian mother and a Jewish father. When Garry was seven years old, his father died of leukemia and five years later he adopted his Armenian mother's maiden name, Gasparyan, which he modified to the more Russian-sounding "Kasparov".
- Nicky Katt, American actor, born Agustin Islas, took his mother's maiden name as his stage surname when he began his career as a child actor.
- Diane Keaton, American actress, was originally named Diane Hall, but could not use that name professionally as it belonged to another actress, so she selected her own mother's maiden name as her professional surname.
- Minka Kelly, American actress, was born in Los Angeles, California, the only child of former Aerosmith guitarist Rick Dufay and the late Maureen Dumont Kelly. Minka and her mother moved to various communities before settling in Chicago by the time Kelly was in junior high school. She adopted her mother's maiden name as her professional name.
- Barbara Kent, Canadian-American film actress, was born Barbara Cloutman in Gadsby, Alberta to Jullion Curtis and Lily Louise (née Kent) Cloutman. She later adopted her mother's maiden name as her professional name.
- Mark Kermode, British film critic, whose original surname was Fairey. He changed his name by deed poll after his parents divorced.
- Olga Kern, Russian classical pianist whose original surname was Pushechnikova.
- Imran Khan, American actor was born Imran Pal. After his father (Anil Pal) and mother (Nuzhat Khan) divorced he took his mother's maiden name as his legal name.
- Elle King, American singer-songwriter, was born Tanner Elle Schneider to American comedian and actor Rob Schneider and American model London King. She chose her mother's surname as a stage name to distinguish herself, her career and identity from her father's.
- Sophie Kinsella, British author, was born Madeleine Sophie Townley. She later adopted her pen name, Sophie Kinsella (which was taken from her middle name and her mother's maiden name).
- Ted Kravitz, British television sports reporter, was born Theodore Slotover.

=== L ===
- Harry Landers, American actor, was born in New York City to parents Jacob and Rose (née Landers) Sorokin, who were Jewish immigrants from Russia. He was the third-oldest out of seven children. He later adopted his mother's maiden name.
- Katherine Kelly Lang, American actress, was born Katherine Kelly Wegeman. She is the daughter of Olympic ski-jumper Keith R. Wegeman and actress Judith Lang and the granddaughter of Oscar-winning cinematographer Charles Lang. She adopted her mother's surname professionally.
- Dorothea Lange, American photographer, was born Dorothea Margaretta Nutzhorn, but after her father abandoned her mother, she stopped using both her middle name and her father's surname, adopting her mother's maiden name in their place.
- Mario Lanza, American singer and actor, born Alfredo Arnold Cocozza, adopted the stage name Mario Lanza, which was his mother (Maria Lanza)'s maiden name.
- Brie Larson, American actress, born Brianne Sidonie Desaulniers, took her Swedish great-grandmother's maiden name ("Larson") as she said "her [own] surname [Desaulniers] was too difficult to pronounce".
- Jody Lawrance, American actress (1930–1986), born Nona Josephine Goddard in Fort Worth, Texas; in 1949 she adopted the screen name of Jody (short for Josephine) Lawrance (her maternal grandmother's maiden name) for her first television role.
- Florence Lawrence, Canadian actress (1886–1938), was born Florence Annie Bridgwood in Hamilton, Ontario to George and Charlotte A. Bridgwood. Her mother, a vaudeville actress, and leading lady and director of the Lawrence Dramatic Company, was known professionally as Lotta Lawrence. Florence's surname was changed at age four to her mother's stage name.
- Jennifer Lee, American screenwriter and film director; born Jennifer Michelle Rebecchi to Linda Lee and Saverio Rebecchi, as an adult, she began using her mother's maiden name, Lee, in a professional capacity and in January 1995, legally changed her last name from Rebecchi to Lee.
- Laura Leighton, American actress, was born Laura Miller in Iowa City, Iowa; she assumed her maternal grandfather's surname in 1988.
- John Le Mesurier, British actor (1912–1983), was born John Elton Le Mesurier de Somerys Halliley to Charles Elton Halliley, a solicitor, and Amy Michelle (née Le Mesurier), and adopted his mother's maiden name as his acting name.
- Alexander Lernet-Holenia was an Austrian poet and novelist, born Alexander Marie Norbert Lernet to Alexander Lernet (an ocean liner officer) and Sidonie (née Holenia), who attached his mother's maiden name to his family name after he was formally adopted by Carinthian relatives of his mother (whose aristocratic family had lost most of its wealth after the war) in 1920.
- C.S. Lewis published the poem "Dymer" under the name "Clive Hamilton"; Hamilton was his mother's maiden name.
- Hamish Linklater was born to Scottish-born Kristin Linklater, Professor of Theatre and Chair of the Acting Division at Columbia University and a renowned teacher of vocal technique, and Jim Cormeny; he is known by Linklater, his mother's maiden name.
- Liu Yifei, Chinese-American actress, took her mother's surname "Liu" after her parents divorced during her youth.
- Anne Lockhart, American actress, was born Anne Kathleen Maloney in New York City, the daughter of actress June Lockhart and Dr. John F. Maloney. Professionally, she used her mother's maiden name through her whole career.
- Julia Lockwood, British actress, born Margaret Julia Leon, daughter of actress Margaret Lockwood and her husband, Rupert Leon. Julia adopted her mother's professional surname.
- Cissie Loftus, Scottish variety hall performer, was born Marie Cecilia Loftus Brown in Glasgow, Scotland to Ben Brown and Marie Loftus (also a variety hall performer). Cissie adopted her mother's maiden name as her professional name.
- Denise Lor, American actress and singer, born Denise Jeanne Briault, in Los Angeles. She decided to use her mother's maiden name, Lor, as her stage name.
- Norman Lumsden, English actor, was born Norman Thompson. He made his first radio broadcast for the BBC in the 1930s, singing Negro spirituals and Czech songs by Dvořák. At this time he changed his surname to Lumsden (his mother's maiden name).
- Dame Beatrix Lyall, née Rostron, and her husband George Lyall, B.A., Conservative Party politician and social activist, and her husband (né George Henry Hudson Pile), a solicitor; he changed his surname by deed poll in 1914 to "Lyall", his mother's maiden name, and his wife followed suit.
- Viola Lyel, English film and stage actress, was born Viola Mary Watson in Hull, Yorkshire, the daughter of Frederick Watson and his wife Elizabeth (née Lyel). She later adopted her mother's maiden name as her professional name.
- Vera Lynn, English singer, born Vera Margaret Welch. She used her grandmother's maiden name.

=== M ===
- Kenneth MacKenna, American actor and film director, was born Leo Mielziner Jr., the son of Leo Mielziner and Ella Lane McKenna Friend; he adopted an almost identical variant (MacKenna) of one of his mother's family names (McKenna) as his professional surname.
- Shirley MacLaine, American actress, was born Shirley MacLean Beaty; she adopted a variation of her mother (Kathlyn Corinne MacLean)'s maiden name as her professional name.
- Benji and Joel Madden, identical twin members of pop punk band Good Charlotte, changed their surname from Combs to their maternal surname, Madden, after their father, Roger Combs, walked out on the family.
- Ramona Mallory, American actress, is the daughter of actors/singers Mark Lambert and Victoria Mallory. She was born Ramona Mallory Lambert, but is known professionally as Ramona Mallory.
- Mona Malm, born Mona Kristina Ericsson, Swedish actress of film, stage, and television, was born in 1935 to Harald Ericsson and Inez Malmberg. She adapted part of her mother's maiden name as her professional name when she began her career with the Swedish Royal Dramatic Theater in 1957.
- Costas and Louis Mandylor, Australian actors of Greek ancestry, were born to Louise (née Mandylaris) and Yannis Theodosopoulos. The brothers adopted a version of their mother's maiden name professionally.
- Barry Manilow, American musician, was born Barry Alan Pincus to Harold Pincus and Edna (née Manilow). His mother's family was Jewish, while his father, who was often known by the surname Keliher, was born to a Jewish father and Irish American mother. Barry adopted his mother's maiden name – Manilow – at the time of his bar mitzvah.
- David Manners, Canadian-American actor; born Rauff de Ryther Daun Acklom, he changed his name legally to David Joseph Manners in 1940 (Manners was his mother's maiden name).
- Chris and Sean Marquette, American actors, borr Christopher George Rodriguez and Sean Anthony Edward Rodriguez, respectively, to Patricia Helen (née Marquette) and Jorge Luis Rodriguez. The brothers adopted their mother's maiden name as their professional surnames.
- Edgar Lee Masters, American writer, first published his early poems and essays under the pseudonym Dexter Wallace, derived from his mother's maiden name and his father's middle name.
- Rudolph Matas, American physician of Spanish descent. He took his paternal grandmother's last name.
- Gordon Matta-Clark, American artist, was born Gordon Roberto Echaurren Matta to Anne Clark, an American artist, and Roberto Matta, a Chilean Surrealist painter. In 1971, he changed his name to Gordon Matta-Clark, adopting his mother's last name.
- Gugu Mbatha-Raw, British actress, was born Gugulethu Sophia Mbatha, to Patrick Mbatha, a South African doctor, and Anne (née Raw), an English nurse. She later added her mother's surname to that of her father.
- Patty McCormack, American actress, was born Patricia Ellen Russo in Brooklyn, New York to Elizabeth (née McCormack), a professional roller skater, and Frank Russo, a fireman. She adopted her mother's maiden name as her professional name.
- Jack McCullough, American convicted murderer and former Washington State policeman, who was convicted in September 2012 of the kidnapping and murder of a young girl (Maria Ridulph) from Sycamore, Illinois in December 1957 (55 years earlier) and sentenced in December 2012 to life imprisonment at age 73, was born John Samuel Tessier and adopted his mother's maiden name as his surname after relocating to Washington.
- Natascha McElhone, British actress, was born Natasha Abigail Taylor to Noreen (née McElhone) and Michael Taylor, both journalists. She took her mother's maiden name as her stage name.
- Ben McKenzie, American actor, was born in Austin, Texas, as Benjamin McKenzie Schenkkan, one of three brothers, to Frances Victory Schenkkan, a poet, and Pieter Meade Schenkkan, an attorney. His middle name, McKenzie, is his paternal grandmother's maiden name.
- Rita McKenzie, New Zealand artist and painter, formerly known as Rita Angus, was born Henrietta Catherine Angus. She married Alfred Cook, another artist, on 13 June 1930. In 1934 they separated due to incompatibility, and divorced in 1939. Angus had signed many of her paintings as Rita Cook between 1930 and 1946, but after she discovered in 1941 that her ex-husband had remarried she changed her surname by deed poll to McKenzie, her paternal grandmother's name. As a result, some of her paintings are signed R. Mackenzie or R. McKenzie.
- Jenna McMahon, born Mary Virginia Skinner, was an American television writer, producer, and comedian. Using the surname McMahon (her mother's maiden name), in 1961, she and Dick Clair formed a comedy act similar to that of Nichols and May, playing nightclubs and eventually appearing on The Ed Sullivan Show, The Merv Griffin Show and other television programs.
- Meng Wanzhou, Chinese business executive, who is the deputy chair of the board and chief financial officer (CFO) of telecom giant and China's largest privately held company, Huawei, founded by her father Ren Zhengfei.
- Juliano Mer-Khamis, Israeli-Palestinian actor and director. Added his mother's maiden name ("Mer") to his surname later in life.
- Alan Merrill, American vocalist, guitarist and songwriter, born Allan Preston Sachs. He adopted his mother's (Helen Merrill) professional surname. Helen Merrill and her first husband, musician Aaron Sachs, divorced several years after they wed.
- Christina Milian, American singer was born Christine Marié Flores to Cuban parents, Don and Carmen (née Milian) Flores. She reportedly adopted her mother's maiden name in the hopes of landing a wider range of acting roles
- Crispian Mills, British musician, born Crispian John David Boulting, son of Roy Boulting and actress Hayley Mills. He adopted his mother's surname professionally. He is also known as Krishna Kantha Das.
- Mike Minor, American actor, was born Michael Fedderson, son of Don Fedderson and Helen Macie "Tido" Minor. He adopted his mother's maiden name as his stage name.
- Yvonne Mitchell, English stage, television and film actor, was born Yvonne Frances Joseph. In 1946 she changed her name by deed poll to Yvonne Mitchell (without the Frances). Her mother's maiden name was Mitchell.
- Melissa Molinaro, Canadian-born actress and singer, born Melissa Ann Smith; she adopted her mother's maiden name (Molinaro) as her professional surname.
- Marilyn Monroe, American actress who was born as Norma Jeane Mortenson and later known as Norma Jeane Baker, she decided to use her own mother's maiden name (Monroe) as her professional surname. She had initially selected the name "Jeane Monroe", but eventually settled on Marilyn Monroe as per advice from a movie studio executive.
- Poppy Montgomery, Australian-American actress, born Poppy Petal Emma Elizabeth Deveraux Donahue to Nicola (née Montgomery) and Philip Donahue; she adopted her mother's maiden name as her professional name.
- John Morghen, Italian actor, born Giovanni Lombardo Radice; he later Anglicised his forename (from "Giovanni" to "John"), and adopted his maternal grandmother's surname (Morghen), as his professional name.
- Brittany Murphy, actress, born Brittany Anne Bertolotti. Murphy was raised by her mother and adopted her mother's maiden name as her own.

=== N ===
- Geoffrey de Neville, born Geoffrey FitzMaldred to Robert FitzMaldred and Isabel of Neville (also known as Isabel de Neville, a Norman heiress), who eventually inherited the Manors of Sheriff Hutton near York and Brancepeth, together with lesser lands and manors. Geoffrey, Lord of Raby Castle, near Staindrop, County Durham, Sheriff of Northumberland, and Justice of the King's Forests, adopted his mother's maiden name (de Neville), as did his brothers, William, Lord of Carleton, and Sir John, Knight.
- Emerson Newton-John, American racing driver, is the son of Graham Hall and Rona Newton-John, elder sister of Olivia Newton-John. He adopted his mother's maiden name. He was named for two-time Indianapolis 500 winner Emerson Fittipaldi.
- Ivor Novello, Welsh musician, composer and actor, born David Ivor Davies, adopted part of his mother (Clara Novello Davies)'s maiden name, "Novello", as his professional surname, although he did not change his name legally [by deed poll] until 1927.
- Marie Novello, Welsh pianist, born Marie Williams in Maesteg, Glamorgan, to William Thomas Williams and Anne Bedlington Kirkhouse. Marie took the surname "Novello" after being adopted by her piano teacher, Clara Novello Davies, mother of Ivor Novello. Critically acclaimed, Marie Novello died at age 30 from esophageal cancer.

=== O ===
- Richard O'Brien, British actor (Rocky Horror Picture Show), born Richard Timothy Smith. Upon launching his acting career he changed his name to O'Brien, his maternal grandmother's name, as there was already an actor named Richard Smith.
- Frank O'Connor, Irish writer, born Michael Francis O'Donovan, adopted his mother (Minnie O'Connor)'s maiden name as his pen name.
- Bulle and Pascale Ogier, French actresses, mother and daughter, respectively. Bulle, born Marie-France Thielland, adopted her mother's maiden name (Ogier) as her professional surname, and Pascale, born Pascale Schroeder, who predeceased her parents, adopted, in turn her own mother's professional surname, i.e. her maternal grandmother's maiden name.
- Susan Oliver, American actress, was born Charlotte Gercke, the daughter of George Gercke, journalist, and Ruth Hale Oliver, an astrology practitioner, in New York City in 1932. Her parents divorced when she was still a child. In June 1949, Oliver joined her mother in Southern California, where Ruth was in the process of becoming a well-known Hollywood astrologer. Oliver made a decision to embark upon a career as an actress and chose the stage name Susan Oliver.
- Naomi Osaka, Japanese professional tennis player. She was born in Japan to a Haitian father and a Japanese mother, Osaka has lived and trained in the United States since she was three years old.
- Sam Outlaw, American musician, was born Sam Morgan in Aberdeen, South Dakota. When Outlaw decided to actively pursue and music career, he borrowed his late mother's maiden name, Outlaw, for a stage moniker, which he continues to use.

=== P ===
- Chris Paciello, American mobster and nightclub owner, was originally named Christian Ludwigsen, but started calling himself Chris Paciello at age 19. He reportedly told friends he decided to use his mother's maiden name of Paciello as a rejection of his father, as well as a claim on the Italian side of his family background.
- Angelica Page, American actress; the daughter of actors Rip Torn and Geraldine Page, she was born Angelica Torn, but legally changed her name in 2011.
- Philippe Panneton, Canadian diplomat, writer, academic and physician, used the pen name "Ringuet", which had been his mother's maiden name.
- Pedro Pascal, Chilean-American actor, was born José Pedro Balmaceda Pascal. Following his mother's death in 1999, he began using her surname professionally, both in honor of her and because he said Americans had difficulty pronouncing the surname Balmaceda.
- Quanah Parker (died 23 February 1911) was a Comanche chief, a leader in the Native American Church, and the last leader of the powerful Quahadi band before they surrendered their battle of the Great Plains and went to a reservation in Indian Territory. He was the son of Comanche chief Peta Nocona and Cynthia Ann Parker, a European American, who had been kidnapped at age nine and assimilated into the tribe. He led his people on the reservation, where he became a wealthy rancher and influential in Comanche and European American society. He adopted his mother's surname as his people did not then use surnames.
- Hunter Parrish, American actor and singer, was born in Richmond, Virginia to Annie Parrish, who works with autistic children, and Bruce Tharp, an engineer. He adopted his mother's maiden name as his professional surname.
- Elsa Pataky, Spanish actress, born Elsa Lafuente in Madrid, Spain, the daughter of José Francisco Lafuente, a Spanish biochemist, and Cristina Pataky Medianu, a publicist of Romanian and Hungarian ancestry. She attended the CEU San Pablo University, studying journalism and taking acting classes. She became an actress and adopted part of her mother's maiden name (Pataky) as her professional name.
- Jim Perry, American television personality and game show host, was born James Edward Dooley in Camden, New Jersey. His mother, Genevieve Perry, was a record holding swimmer, as well as a known marathon dancer. His father, Edward Dooley, was a musician. Due to a name conflict with AFTRA, he adopted his mother's maiden name of Perry when he began his television work.
- Katy Perry was born Katheryn Elizabeth Hudson and released her self-titled debut album, Katy Hudson, under her real surname. She adopted her mother's surname as a stage name for her next album, One of the Boys.
- Prince Philip, Duke of Edinburgh, adopted his mother's name of Mountbatten in 1947, along with a new nationality and religious affiliation, before his marriage to Elizabeth II.
- Marguerite Piazza, American operatic soprano and philanthropist; born as Marguerite Claire Luft, she adopted her mother's maiden name as her professional name.
- Pablo Picasso, Spanish painter; born Pablo Diego José Francisco de Paula Juan Nepomuceno María de los Remedios Cipriano de la Santísima Trinidad Ruiz y Picasso, "he adopted his mother's Italian surname, because he thought it suited him better. Here's how he explained it to Hungarian artist George Brassaï: '[Picasso] was stranger, more resonant, than Ruiz ... Do you know what appealed to me about that name? Well, it was undoubtedly the double s, which is fairly unusual in Spain. Picasso is of Italian origin, as you know. And the name a person bears or adopts has its importance. Can you imagine me calling myself Ruiz? Pablo Ruiz? Diego-José Ruiz? Or Juan-Népomucène Ruiz?'".
- Piero Piccioni, Italian lawyer, film score composer, pianist, organist, conductor, and author; his mother's maiden name was Marengo, hence his pseudonym Piero Morgan, which he adopted until 1957.
- Aida Pierce, Mexican actress and comedian, born Aida María Zerecero Pierce to José Luis Zerecero and Aida Pierce. She adopted her mother's maiden name as her professional name.
- Martha Plimpton, American actress, is the daughter of actors Keith Carradine and Shelley Plimpton. Her parents never married and she was raised by her mother. Some sources indicate she was born Martha Campbell Carradine, others cite Martha Campbell Plimpton.
- Clémence Poésy, French fashion model and film/television actress. Born Clémence Guichard, she adopted her mother's maiden name as her professional surname.
- Georg Joachim de Porris, later known as Rheticus, was a mathematician, cartographer, navigational-instrument maker, medical practitioner, and teacher, born at Feldkirch to Georg and Thomasina (née de Porris) Iserin. His parents were wealthy as his father was the town physician. However, Georg Iserin abused the trust of many of his patients, stealing belongings and money, and, in 1528 was convicted and executed. The family was stripped of their surname and adopted de Porris, Rheticus' mother's maiden name. Later as a student in Wittenberg, Georg de Porris adopted the toponym Rheticus, a form of the Latin name for his home region, Rhaetia. In the matriculation list for the University of Leipzig his family name, "de Porris", is translated into German as "von Lauchen".
- Natalie Portman, Oscar-winning Israeli-American actress; born Neta-Lee Hershlag, she took her paternal grandmother (Mania Hershlag)'s maiden name, "Portman", as her stage name.
- Sally Pressman, American actress and dancer, was born Sally Pressman Bernstein in New York City to Penny Ann (née Pressman) and Jonathan Bernstein. She adopted her mother's maiden name as her professional surname.

=== Q ===
- Thomas Quick (born Sture Ragnar Bergwall, a name he has since readopted, after using his mother's maiden name "Quick" for many years) – convicted Swedish criminal, previously believed to be a serial killer, having confessed to more than 30 murders. He was convicted of eight of these murders, but all of the convictions have been overturned.

=== R ===
- Barbara Randolph, American singer and actress, adopted her mother (actress Lillian Randolph)'s surname. She appeared in her mother's nightclub acts and had a role in the 1967 film Guess Who's Coming to Dinner.
- Sally Jessy Raphael, American talk show host and television personality, was born in 1935 in Easton, Pennsylvania to Jesse Lowenthal, a businessman, and his wife, Dede Lowry (née Raphael), an artist.
- Ravachol, French anarchist; born François Claudius Koenigstein, the son of a Dutch father (Jean Adam Koenigstein) and a French mother (Marie Ravachol); he adopted his mother's maiden name after his father abandoned the family.
- Tony Revolori, American actor, born Anthony Quiñonez, adopted the surname of his paternal grandmother as his stage name.
- Jonathan Rhys Meyers, Irish actor, born Jonathan Michael Francis O'Keeffe to musician John O'Keeffe and his wife, Mary Geraldine (née Meyers). Rhys Meyers' stage name is partially derived from his mother's maiden name.
- Micheál Richardson, British actor and son of actor Liam Neeson and the late actress Natasha Richardson. Born Micheál Neeson, he adopted his mother's name in her honor almost 10 years after her death.
- Talulah Riley, British actress and former wife of billionaire Elon Musk, born Talulah Jane Riley-Milburn to Una Riley, founder of a security systems company and a PR company, and Doug Milburn, formerly head of the National Crime Squad, who now works as a screenwriter (Silent Witness, Prime Suspect and The Bill); known professionally and socially as Talulah Riley.
- Diana-Maria Riva, American actress, born Diana-Maria Uhlenbrock in Cincinnati, Ohio, the daughter of Maria (née Riva) and Chris B. Uhlenbrock, a dentist. She adopted her mother's maiden name as her professional surname.
- Melissa Rivers, American television personality, born Melissa Warburg Rosenberg, adopted the professional surname used by her own mother (Joan Rivers).
- Chino Rodriguez, American musician and impresario of Puerto Rican and Chinese descent, specializing in Latin music, most notably Salsa and Latin jazz. Chino was born James Mui to Chueng Mui and Gloria Figueroa Rodriguez.
- Christy Carlson Romano, American actress and singer, born Christy Michelle Romano, adopted her mother Sharon's maiden name (Carlson) as part of her professional name.
- Hayden Rorke, American actor, was the son of screen and stage actress Margaret Rorke (née Hayden), The actor took his professional name from her.
- Mike Rossman, American professional boxer and one-time WBA light heavyweight champion of the world, was born Michael Albert DePiano. Rossman is his mother's maiden name, which he uses rather than that of his father as part of an appeasement agreement. Rossman's father was Italian, and his mother Jewish.
- Gennady Rozhdestvensky, Russian conductor, was born Gennady Nikolayevich Anosov in Moscow to noted conductor and pedagogue Nikolai Anosov and soprano Natalya Rozhdestvenskaya. He adopted his mother's maiden name in its masculine form for his professional career so as to avoid the appearance of nepotism. His younger brother, the painter P.N. Anosov, retained their father's name.
- Jacobo Rubalcaba, Cuban musician, composer, bandleader and educator, was born Jacobo González Rubalcaba in Sagua La Grande. He adopted his mother's maiden name for professional use.
- Holger Rune, Danish tennis player; born Holger Vitus Nødskov Rune to Aneke Rune (his mother) and Anders Nødskov (his father).
- Meg Ryan, American actress, born Margaret Mary Emily Anne Hyra, changed her surname when she registered with Screen Actors Guild, adopting "Ryan", her grandmother's maiden name.

=== S ===
- Isla St Clair, a Scottish singer, actress and former game show co-host, born Isabella Margaret Dyce, adopted a variation of her mother's maiden name, Sinclair, after her parents divorced.
- Dmitry Salita, Ukraine-born American boxer, born Dmitry Aleksandrovich Lekhtman, adopted his late mother's maiden name as his surname.
- Ruben Santiago-Hudson, American actor, was born Ruben Hudson to Alean Hudson and Ruben Santiago; he adopted a compound surname, with both parents' surnames.
- Henri Sauguet, French composer, born Henri Pierre Poupard. He first used his mother's maiden name when he began performing as a musician in deference to his father, a businessman, who did not want his family name associated with a profession he deemed to be "undignified".
- Prunella Scales, English actress, was born Prunella Margaret Rumney Illingworth. Her mother was actress Catherine Scales.
- Maria Schneider, French actress, was born Marie Christine Gélin to Daniel Gélin, a French actor, and his wife, Marie-Christine Schneider. She was raised by her mother and took her mother's maiden name as her own professional name.
- Romy Schneider, German born actress who held French citizenship, was born Rosemarie Magdalena Albach. After Romy's parents' divorce in 1945, her mother Magda (née Schneider), took charge of Romy and her brother Wolfi. Romy later adopted her mother's maiden name professionally.
- Kaya Scodelario, English actress, born Kaya Rose Humphrey, was born in Haywards Heath, England. Her mother, Katia Scodelario, is Brazilian, and moved to England in 1990 (her surname comes from her Italian grandfather). Her father, Roger Humphrey, was English. Her parents divorced when she was a child and she was brought up by her mother, subsequently adopting her surname and becoming fluent in Portuguese.
- Lev and Sergei Sedov were the sons of the Russian Communist leader Leon Trotsky and his second wife Natalia Sedova; they took their mother's (maiden) name for political reasons.
- Ayrton Senna, Brazilian racecar driver, was born Ayrton Senna da Silva, but as "Silva" is a very common Brazilian name, he adopted his mother's maiden name ("Senna").
- Fiona Shaw, Irish actress, was born Fiona Mary Wilson, but on joining Equity changed her name as there was already a member named Fiona Wilson. She adopted the surname Shaw, her grandmother's maiden name and also as a tribute to Irish playwright George Bernard Shaw.
- Mallika Sherawat, Bollywood actress, was born Reema Lamba. "Sherawat" is her mother's maiden name. She has stated that she uses her mother's maiden name because of the support she received from her mother.
- Jane Siberry, Canadian singer and musician, was born Jane Stewart in Toronto in 1955, and raised in the suburb of Etobicoke. She would take her subsequent surname, "Siberry", from the family name of her maternal aunt and uncle. Many years later, she would explain this choice by stating "this woman and her husband were the first couple I met where I could feel the love between them and I held that in front of me as a reference point."
- Simone Signoret, French actress, was born Simone Henriette Charlotte Kaminker. Her family name was a Jewish name. In order to get acting work in Nazi-occupied France in the early 1940s, she adopted her Catholic mother's maiden name of "Signoret" as her professional name.
- Stevan Sinđelić (1771–1809), Serbian revolutionary leader, was born Stevan Rakić. His father, a craftsman named Radovan Rakić, died at a young age. His mother, Sinđelija, remarried, and her son later adopted the surname from his mother's matronymic ("Sinđelija").
- Lilia Skala, Austrian-American actress, was born Lilia Sofer in Vienna. Her mother, Katharina Skala, was Catholic, and her father, Julius Sofer, who worked as a manufacturers representative for Jindřich Waldes, was Jewish. Lilia adopted her mother's surname professionally.
- J. Smith-Cameron, American actress, born Jean Isabel Smith, "adopted the hyphenated 'Cameron' name to her moniker as both a tribute to her great-grandmother and in order to avoid confusion once she joined Actor's Equity", as there was already another actress registered with the name Jean Smith.
- Lucita Soriano, Filipino actress (13 July 1940 – 8 July 2015), was born Lucita Soriano Adriano in Taguig to Eugenio Adriano and Elvira Jamon Soriano, and spent her early years in Pateros. She adopted her mother's maiden name as her professional surname.
- John Standing, British actor, born John Ronald Leon, the son of Kay Hammond (née Dorothy Katherine Standing), an actress, and Sir Ronald George Leon, a stockbroker. From a well-known acting family on his mother's side, including his great-grandfather Herbert Standing (1846–1923) and his grandfather, Sir Guy Standing (1873–1937), he adopted his mother's maiden name as his acting name. He is officially titled as Sir John Ronald Leon Standing, 4th Baronet.
- Jean Stapleton, American actress, born Jeanne Murray, the daughter of Joseph E. and Marie (née Stapleton) Murray, she adopted her mother's maiden name as her professional name.
- Mary Stuart, American actress and singer-songwriter, was born Mary Stuart Houchins. She used her middle name of Stuart, which was her mother's maiden name, as her professional name. Stuart's own daughter, Cynthia Krolik changed her surname to that of her maternal grandmother (Stuart). Cynthia graduated from the North Carolina School of the Arts and eventually became a journalist, writing for the Detroit Free Press, before following in her mother's footsteps as an actress.
- Ferenc Szombathelyi, born Ferenc Knausz or Ferenc Knauz, was a Hungarian military officer who served, from September 1941 to April 1944, as Head of the General Staff of the Royal Hungarian Army during World War II. From 1934 he used the surname of his mother instead of his German name. He was executed in Serbia for war crimes in 1946.

=== T ===
- Mabel Terry-Lewis, British actress, was born Mabel Gwynedd Terry, in London, the youngest of the four children, all daughters, of Arthur James Lewis (1824–1901) and his wife Kate, née Terry. Her father was a prosperous businessman, co-owner of the haberdashery firm of Lewis and Allenby, and an amateur painter, illustrator and musician. Her mother was from the prestigious Terry acting family. Mabel added her mother's maiden name to her surname as a portmanteau professional name.
- David Thewlis, British actor, was born David Wheeler in Blackpool, Lancashire, to Maureen (née Thewlis) and Alec Raymond Wheeler; when he registered with the actors' union, he intended to use Wheeler as his stage name, but a "David Wheeler" already existed. His mother's maiden name was the first that came to mind.
- Jennifer and Meg Tilly, American-Canadian actresses, born Jennifer Chan and Margaret Chan, respectively, adopted their mother Patricia (née Tilly)'s maiden name.
- Allen Toussaint, American musician, used the pseudonym Naomi Neville for some of his work; Naomi Neville was his mother's maiden name.
- Henrietta Treffz, born Henrietta Chalupetzky (1 July 1818 – 8 April 1878), a well-known mezzo-soprano and the first wife of Johann Strauss II, adopted her mother's maiden name, Treffz, for professional purposes.
- Dennis Trillo, born Abelardo Dennis Florendo Ho (or Abelardo Dennis Florendo Trillo Ho), was born to Florita (née Trillo), and Abelardo Leslie Ho. The actor adopted his mother's maiden name as his acting name.
- George Loane Tucker was born George S. Loane in Chicago to George Loane and stage actress Ethel Tucker. He later adopted his mother's surname professionally, while inserting his father's surname as his middle name.
- Susan Tyrrell, born Susan Jillian Creamer, was born to Gillian (née Tyrrell) and John Creamer, who divorced. The actress adopted her mother's maiden name as her acting name.

=== V ===
- Eve Valois, French dancer, singer, sex star and pornographic actress, was raised in the resort town of La Baule on the Atlantic coast. She often talked about her unhappy childhood, with her father absent and her mother Catherine Valois (née Ferrari) disliking her.
- Martin van Maële, French illustrator, born Maurice François Alfred Martin, combined his original surname and his mother's maiden name to create the pseudonym under which he published erotic artwork.
- JD Vance, American politician and author, was born James Donald Bowman. After his parents Donald and Beverly (née Vance) Bowman divorced he took his grandfather' surname as his legal name.
- Eddie Vedder, American musician, was born Edward Louis Severson III. His parents divorced when he was one year old, and Vedder was adopted by his mother (Karen Lee Vedder)'s new husband (Peter Mueller) soon after, becoming Edward Mueller. He grew up believing Mueller was his biological father and stayed with him after his stepfather and mother divorced. After learning the truth, and as his biological father was deceased, he rejoined the rest of his family and adopted his mother's maiden name.
- Bobby Vernon, American actor and filmwriter. The son of actors Harry Burns and Dorothy Vernon, he first appeared onstage at the age of nine.
- Mavis Villiers, Australian-born British stage, film and television actress. Her parents were John and Clara (née Villiers) Cooney. Her brother, Cecil Cooney, was a camera operator and cinematographer. Her stage name, Villiers, was taken from her maternal grandfather.

=== W ===
- Benjamin Walker, American actor, was born in Georgia, the son of Jeannine (née Walker), a music teacher, and Greg Davis, who owned a movie rental store and works in financial services. He took his mother's maiden name as his stage name because there was a Benjamin Davis already registered with the Screen Actors Guild.
- Herta Ware, American actress, was born Herta Schwartz in Wilmington, Delaware, the daughter of Helen Ware, a musician and violin teacher, and Lazlo Schwartz, an actor who was born in Budapest. Her mother's brother was activist Harold Ware and her maternal grandmother was labor organizer and socialist Ella Reeve Bloor. Her father was Jewish and her mother was Christian.
- Richard Waring, English-born American actor, was born Richard Waring Stephens, the son of Thomas E. Stephens, a painter, and Evelyn M. Stephens (née Waring). He adopted his mother's maiden name as his stage name, and later became legally known by that name following his naturalization as a United States citizen in 1937.
- Theodore Watts-Dunton (1832–1914) was an English critic, poet and lawyer, born Walter Theodore Watts. In 1897, he chose to add his mother's maiden name (Dunton) to his surname. Abandoning natural history for the law, he qualified as a solicitor and went to London, where he practised for some years, giving his spare time to his chosen pursuit of literature.
- Michael Weston, American actor, born Michael Rubinstein in New York City, the son of actors Judi West and John Rubinstein, he had to change his surname professionally as there was already an actor with the same name. He adopted a variation ("Weston") of his mother's surname ("West").
- Antonia White, British writer, originally named Eirene Adeline Botting. She adopted her mother's maiden name as her pen name, feeling her original name was not "sufficiently imposing" for her personality.
- Bernie Williams, American baseball player, born Bernabé Williams Figueroa Jr., was born to Bernabé Williams Figueroa Sr., a merchant marine and dispatcher, and Rufina Williams, a retired principal and college professor.
- Otis Williams, born Otis Miles Jr., is an American baritone singer. He was born to Otis Miles and Hazel Louise Williams, an unmarried couple who separated shortly after their son's birth. He adopted his mother's maiden name for his stage name.
- Shelley Winters, American actress, was originally named Shirley Schrift. Her stage name ("Winters") was based on her mother's maiden name ("Winter").
- John Wojtowicz, the American bank robber whose story was the basis for the movie Dog Day Afternoon, used the alias Littlejohn Basso in gay bars. His adopted name was based on a combination of a nickname and his mother's maiden name.

=== Y ===
- Momoe Yamaguchi: Japanese singer, actress, idol.

== See also ==
- List of pen names
- List of pseudonyms
- List of stage names
