= List of stage names =

This list of stage names lists names used by those in the entertainment industry, alphabetically by their stage name's surname (or best approximation) followed by their birth name. Individuals who dropped their last name and substituted their middle name as their last name are listed. One-word stage names are listed in a separate article.

In many cases, performers have legally changed their name to their stage name.

Note: Many cultures have their own naming customs and systems, some rather intricate. Minor changes or alterations, including reversing Eastern-style formats, do not in and of themselves qualify as stage names and should not normally be included. For example, Björk is not a stage name, it is part of her full Icelandic name, Björk Guðmundsdóttir. Her second name is a patronymic instead of a family name, following Icelandic naming conventions.

People are not listed here if they fall into one or more of the following categories:

- Those who have more than one family name, provided at least one is represented in the professional name. This is especially common with people from Spanish or Portuguese-speaking countries and in the Philippines.
- Those who changed their name to perform a character or alter ego, including drag performers and professional wrestlers.
- Those who changed their name to undertake an alias, rather than a name with which the subject will publicly identify.
- Those who changed their surname due primarily to marriage, even if the marriage has since ended.
- Those who changed their surname due to adoption or legal name change prior to entering the entertainment industry.
- Those known by nicknames both privately and professionally.
- Those who may be popularly, though not professionally, known by a nickname.
- Those who changed their name(s) due to realized change in sexual/gender identity, or other recognized gender-related reasons.
- Those who changed their names for religious reasons.
- Those who adopted a matriname:
  - List of people who adopted matrilineal surnames
- Those who changed their name(s) due to other or unknown reasons unrelated to show business of any kind.

== List ==
=== The/Tha ===
Stage names with 'the' or 'tha' in the name.
Stage name	Birth name	Life	Notability	Notes
Cedric the Entertainer	Cedric Antonio Kyles	1964–	American comedian and actor	
Chance the Rapper	Chancelor Johnathan Bennett	1993–	American rapper, singer-songwriter and record producer	
Charlamagne tha God	Lenard Larry McKelvey	1978–	American radio host, television personality and comedian	
Del the Funky Homosapien	Teren Delvon Jones	1972–	American rapper	Sometimes stylized as Del tha Funkee Homosapien
Eric the Actor	Eric Shaun Lynch	1975–2014	American actor	Once known as Eric the Midget
Gene Gene the Dancing Machine	Eugene Sidney Patton Sr.	1932–2015	American dancer and stagehand	
Hank the Angry Drunken Dwarf	Henry Joseph Nasiff Jr.	1962–2001	American entertainer	
Herrmann the Great	Alexander Herrmann	1844–1896	French magician	
Jed the Fish	Edwin Jed Fish Gould III	1955–2025	American disc jockey	
Jimmy the Robot	James Randall Briggs Jr.	1978–	American musician (The Aquabats)	
Larry the Cable Guy	Daniel Lawrence Whitney	1963–	American comedian and actor	
Morganna, the Kissing Bandit	Morganna Roberts	1947–	American entertainer	
Mr.B The Gentleman Rhymer	Jim Burke	Unknown	British parodist	
muMs the Schemer	Craig O'Neil Grant	1968–2021	American poet and actor	Also known as Craig muMs Grant
Murray the K	Murray Kaufman	1922–1982	American impresario and disc jockey	
Nash the Slash	James Jeffrey Plewman	1948–2014	Canadian musician	
Ovy on the Drums	Daniel Echavarría Oviedo	1991–	Colombian record producer and songwriter	
Sleek The Elite	Paul Nakad	1975–	Australian actor and rapper	
R.A. the Rugged Man	R.A. Thorburn	1974–	American rapper and producer	
The Amazing Johnathan	John Edward Szeles	1958–2022	American comedian and magician	
The Amazing Kreskin	George Joseph Kresge Jr.	1935–2024	American mentalist	
The Big Bopper	Jiles Perry Richardson Jr.	1930–1959	American musician and disc jockey	
The Bullitts	Jeymes Samuel	1979–	British filmmaker, singer-songwriter, music producer and composer	
The Child of Lov	Martijn William Zimri Teerlinck	1987–2013	Belgian-Dutch poet and musician	Also known as Cole Williams
The D.O.C.	Tracy Lynn Curry	1968–	American rapper, songwriter and record producer (Fila Fresh Crew)	Also known as Doc, Doc-T, The Diggy Diggy Doc and Trey
The Edge	David Howell Evans	1961–	English-Irish musician (U2)	
The Game	Jayceon Terrell Taylor	1979–	American rapper	
The Jacka	Dominic Newton	1977–2015	American rapper (Mob Figaz)	
the Kid LAROI	Charlton Kenneth Jeffrey Howard	2003–	Australian rapper and singer	
The Mascara Snake	Victor Hayden	1948–2018	American artist and musician	
The Mo City Don	Joseph Wayne McVey	1977–	American rapper	Also known as Z-Ro
The Notorious B.I.G.	Christopher George Latore Wallace	1972–1997	American rapper	Also known as Biggie Smalls
The Phantom	Jerry Lott	1938–1983	American musician	
The Rev	James Owen Sullivan	1981–2009	American musician (Avenged Sevenfold)	Stage name short for The Reverend Tholomew Plague
The Reverend Horton Heat	James C. Heath	1959–	American musician	
The Singing Nun	Jeanne-Paule Marie Deckers	1933–1985	Belgian singer-songwriter	
The Unknown Comic	Murray Langston	1944–	Canadian comedian	
Trae tha Truth	Frazier Othel Thompson III	1980–	American rapper	
Trugoy the Dove	David Jude Jolicoeur	1968–2023	American rapper (De La Soul)	Also known as Plug and TwoDave
Tyler, the Creator	Tyler Gregory Okonma	1991–	American rapper and record producer	

=== Other ===
Includes stage names that contain numbers or other non-alphabetic characters.

Other stage names
Stage name	Birth name	Life	Notability	Notes
Anderson .Paak	Brandon Anderson	1986–	American rapper, singer and songwriter	
André 3000	André Benjamin	1975–	American rapper, singer and songwriter	
Apache 207	Volkan Yaman	1997–	German rapper	
apl.de.ap	Allan Pineda Lindo	1974–	Filipino-American rapper, singer and producer (Black Eyed Peas)	
Chali 2na	Charles Stewart	1971–	American rapper	
Code: Pandorum	Sven Selka	1996–	German electronic musician and producer	Also known as Inhuman and Static:Reset
Fab 5 Freddy	Fred Braithwaite	1959–	American rapper and filmmaker	
John 5	John Lowery	1970–	American guitarist	
Jussi 69	Jussi Vuori	1972–	Finnish musician (The 69 Eyes)	
Jyrki 69	Jyrki Linnankivi	1968–	Finnish musician (The 69 Eyes)	
Miss Eighty 6	Sarai Howard	1981–	American rapper	
Pavel 183	Pavel Pukhov	1983–2013	Russian street artist	
Royce da 5'9"	Ryan Montgomery	1977–	American rapper	Also known as Nickel Nine, Nickle, Royce 5'9" and R-Dog
S.Coups	Choi Seung-cheol	1995–	South Korean rapper, singer and songwriter (Seventeen)	
Tech N9ne	Aaron Yates	1971–	American rapper	
Thomas G:son	Thomas Gustafsson	1968–	Swedish composer and musician	
TOMM¥ €A$H	Tomas Tammemets	1991–	Estonian rapper, singer, dancer and visual artist	
Ty Dolla $ign	Tyrone Griffin Jr.	1982–	American rapper, singer and songwriter	
Wednesday 13	Joseph Poole	1976–	American singer and musician	Also known as Joe Nothing and Audrey 3
2 Chainz	Tauheed Epps	1977–	American rapper	Also known as Tity Boi and Drenchgod
21 Savage	Shéyaa Bin Abraham-Joseph	1992–	British-American rapper	
50 Cent	Curtis Jackson III	1975–	American rapper and actor	
75 Cents	Ladislav Demeterffy	1933–2010	Croatian singer	
9th Wonder	Patrick Douthit	1975–	American rapper and record producer	

== See also ==
- List of drag queens
- List of nicknames of blues musicians
- List of nicknames of jazz musicians
- List of people who adopted matrilineal surnames
- List of one-word stage names
- List of pen names
- Lists of professional wrestling personnel
- List of pseudonyms
