= Yevgeny Kharitonov (poet) =

Soviet playwright and writer (1941–1981)

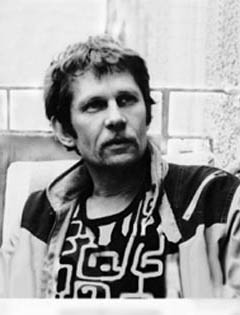
Yevgeny Kharitonov

Yevgeny Vladimirovich Kharitonov (Russian: Евге́ний Влади́мирович Харито́нов; 11 July 1941 – 29 July 1981) was a Soviet writer, poet, playwright, and theater director.

Born in Novosibirsk, he graduated from the acting department of the Gerasimov Institute of Cinematography. After a brief career as an actor, he returned to university to study filmmaking as a graduate student, defending his graduate thesis on pantomime. He wrote and directed a play, The Enchanted Island, for the Theater of Mimicry and Gesture in Moscow. He led the pantomime studio of the Moskvorechye Workers' Club, and choreographed the rock band Last Chance. He died of a heart attack on Pushkin Street in Moscow, one day after completing the manuscript of his play Under House Arrest, which would not be published until seven years after his death. He was buried in Novosibirsk and posthumously awarded the Andrei Bely Prize.

Among the few works Kharitonov published openly during his lifetime were several translations of contemporary German language poetry, including that of the Austrian Ingeborg Bachmann. Most of his works were circulated in samizdat periodicals such as Hours, Bypass Channel, 37, and Mitin Journal.

Kharitonov's work lies at the convergence of several currents in 20th-century Russian prose. His emphasis on the distance between author and lyric subject anticipates Victor Erofeyev and Vladimir Sorokin; and he shares with Pavel Ulitin (and with Proust and Joyce) a cryptographic, indirect approach to the encoding of emotion in events. He had a peculiarly acute awareness of the expressive properties of typewritten text. His preoccupation with typography, and his resulting mistrust of samizdat typists, may account for the fact that he typed all his manuscripts himself. It has also been conjectured that his frank descriptions of gay life so offended the typists' sensibilities that they refused to copy his manuscripts.

Above all, Kharitonov is recognized as a founder of modern Russian gay literature, and arguably the most important gay Russian writer since Mikhail Kuzmin. His work is inseparable from his sexuality, its legal and cultural prohibition, and its psychological dimension. As an underground writer and a gay man, he was doubly vulnerable to state repression, and had frequent encounters with the KGB. In 1979, he was questioned as a suspect in the murder of a gay friend. As his literary star rose, the surveillance and harassment increased, and may have contributed to his fatal heart attack. Following his death, his apartment was sealed by the KGB. In order to preserve his writings, his friends broke in and stole whatever manuscripts they could, but most were later recovered by the KGB.

== Works ==
- Pantomime in the Instruction of the Film Actor (Пантомима в обучении киноактера) - Dissertation, 1972.
- Tears on the Flowers (Слезы на цветах), 1993.
- Under House Arrest (Под домашним арестом), 1988.
