= Two in Love =

- Russian: Двое
- Directed by: Mikhail Bogin
- Written by: Mikhail Bogin; Yuri Chulyukin
- Produced by: Khariy Kinstler
- Starring: Victoria Fyodorova; Valentin Smirnitskiy
- Cinematography: Rihards Piks; Henriks Pilipsons
- Edited by: Elza Preisa
- Music by: Romuald Grinblat
- Production company: Riga Film Studio
- Release date: October 25, 1965
- Running time: 37 min.
- Country: Soviet Union
- Language: Russian

Two in Love (Russian: Двое, romanized: Dvoe) is a 1965 Soviet short romantic drama film directed by Mikhail Bogin.

The plot for the film was a story from the life of a deaf actress of the Moscow Theater of Mimicry and Gesture Svetlana Sonina.

== Plot ==
Sergey, a future musician and student at the Riga Conservatory, unexpectedly encounters Natasha, a strikingly silent brunette, on the street and falls in love with her. What begins as lighthearted flirtation soon takes a serious turn when he learns that Natasha has been deaf since the age of three. Sergey’s carefree attitude is confronted with an unexpected reality, forcing him to question his own conscience. To build a relationship with someone so sensitive and different, Sergey must undergo significant inner transformation.

Natasha, who works as a circus dancer and a lighting technician at the Theater of Mimicry and Gesture, makes an equally sincere effort to understand Sergey’s world of music, just as he tries to grasp her world of physical expression. However, for Natasha, who lost her hearing during the Great Patriotic War, sounds are tied to pain and fear. Even a classical music concert that Sergey takes her to becomes a harrowing experience, evoking memories of childhood bombings and the terrifying sounds of war.

== Cast ==
- Victoria Fyodorova as Natasha
- Valentin Smirnitskiy as Sergey
- Marta Grakhova as Juliet
- Voldemar Akuraters as director
- Vlada Freymute as daughter
- Rudolf Dambran as theatre manager
- Tamara Vitinya as choreographer
- Vyacheslav Zakharov as Dima
