= Target (1985 film) =

1985 film directed by Arthur Penn

- Film poster
- Directed by: Arthur Penn
- Screenplay by: Howard Berk; Don Petersen
- Story by: Leonard B. Stern
- Produced by: David Brown; Richard D. Zanuck
- Starring: Gene Hackman; Matt Dillon
- Cinematography: Jean Tournier
- Edited by: Richard P. Cirincione; Stephen A. Rotter
- Music by: Michael Small
- Production company: CBS Theatrical Films
- Distributed by: Warner Bros.
- Release date: November 8, 1985
- Running time: 117 minutes
- Country: United States
- Language: English
- Budget: $12.9 million
- Box office: $9,023,199 (US/Canada)

Target is a 1985 American spy thriller film directed by Arthur Penn and starring Gene Hackman, Matt Dillon, and Gayle Hunnicutt. Hackman plays an ex-CIA agent, whose wife is kidnapped, and travels to Europe with his son (Dillon) to find her.

The film was released on November 8, 1985. It was the last film distributed by Warner Bros. Pictures before ending the distribution deal with CBS and shutting down its film production arm.

== Plot ==
In Paris, a woman named Donna Lloyd has been missing for two days. In Dallas, her husband Walter and their college-age son Chris decide to look for her. At the airport, Chris bumps into backpacker Carla. Walter, on the other hand, bumps into Heinz Henke, a man with a gun who has Donna's jewelry. A man in glasses then tries to kill Walter, accidentally shooting Henke before disappearing.

At the hotel in Paris, Walter reveals that Donna has been kidnapped. Chris later saves his life when a car shoots at Walter. After they escape, Walter confesses that he used to work for the CIA.

Meanwhile, to Walter's chagrin, the CIA are watching the pair to make sure that they do not get into trouble. The two leave for Hamburg by train, evading the CIA in the process. At the train station, Walter and Chris see a man approach a similar pair - a young man and his father - yelling "Mendelssohn" to them. The man then grabs a fiddle and begins playing a tune. Walter and Chris leave. On the way out, Chris spots Carla.

The next day, they decide to meet "The Colonel", Walter's old boss. Chris spots the fiddler, and Walter tears off in the car. They attempt to lose their pursuers, but when they cannot, Walter leaves Chris and takes off on foot. Cornered by the fiddler and another agent, Walter jumps off the pier onto a passing ferry. The two agents hum the tune to Walter, and point for him to meet them further up the channel. The assassin who attempted to kill Walter earlier is there. He considers murdering Walter, but ultimately kills the fidler when the latter tries to stop him. Chris later picks Walter up.

At the Colonel's, Walter asks him about Henke. They recall "Operation Clean Sweep", where they killed five of six agents. The tune turns out to be a Mendelssohn concerto. (Note: More specifically, the Mendelssohn Violin Concerto.) "Mendelssohn" was the codename of Schroeder, the agent who escaped "Clean Sweep".

Walter later leaves for West Berlin, to a Pension. Chris then leaves on a train to Frankfurt, where he will presumably be safe.

The assassin later visits and tortures the Colonel for the Lloyds' location. Though the Colonel does not give them up, his caretaker does, and the assassin kills both of them.

At the train station, Chris spots Carla, who is supposedly headed to Berlin to stay with friends. Chris decides to change his travel plans to Berlin, where the two have sex.

Chris later visits Walter, who sends him out to keep watch at a café near the pension. Their plan is disrupted, however, when Carla appears. Chris spots the assassin and moves to signal Walter, but Carla pulls out a gun and forces him to stay put. The assassin enters the apartment, where Walter shoots him dead. Chris slugs Carla and flees with Walter.

That night, Walter heads alone into East Berlin and is picked up by a courier who takes him to a farm. Schroeder is there and says that his family, a wife and two children, were murdered by the CIA. Walter denies it, having investigated the killings. He thinks that there is another party involved. The group that has been recently trying to kill him may have "walked in both camps."

Meanwhile, following Walter's instructions, Chris heads to the US Embassy in Berlin. Chris is later contacted by Walter, who tells him to head to an abandoned air force base where the CIA used to exchange captured agents with the East. Though he proceeds alone to East Berlin, the embassy's director Barney Taber and agent Clay catch up with him and Walter. While Walter and Taber talk, Chris enters a hangar nearby and finds Donna bound and wrapped in plastic explosives.

Walter and Clay defuse the bomb. Taber then shoots Clay dead. Taber is the double agent who betrayed both Walter and Schroeder and was responsible for the death of the latter's family. Walter gets the jump on him when Schroeder reappears. Schroeder then sends the Lloyds away before blowing himself and Taber up with the explosives.

== Cast ==
Credits from the AFI Catalog of Feature Films.

- Gene Hackman as Walter Lloyd/Duncan (Duke) Potter
- Matt Dillon as Chris Lloyd/Derek Potter
- Gayle Hunnicutt as Donna Lloyd
- Josef Sommer as Barney Taber
- Guy Boyd as Clay
- Viktoriya Fyodorova as Lise
- Herbert Berghof as Schroeder
- Ilona Grübel as Carla
- James Selby as Ross
- Ray Fry as Mason
- Richard Münch as The Colonel
- Tomas Hnevsa as Hans Henke
- Jean-Pol Dubois as "Glasses"
- Ullrich Haupt as Older Agent
- Werner Pochath as Younger Agent
- Jany Holt as Proprietress
- Jean-Pierre Stewart as Ballard

== Production ==
The film was Penn's first commercial failure since Four Friends released in 1981. It was the first film shot by Penn in Europe. Filming took place in Paris, France; Berlin and Hamburg, Germany; Dallas and Corpus Christi, Texas. The film was made for $1.4 million less than its $12.9 million budget.

== Reception ==
=== Box office ===
The film was released on November 8, 1985, on 1,085 screens in the United States and opened in second place behind Death Wish 3 with a weekend gross of $2,670,522. It grossed a total of $9 million in the United States and Canada.

=== Critical response ===
The film received a mixed response from critics. On Rotten Tomatoes, Target holds a rating of 63% from 27 reviews. The site's consensus states: "Target's increasingly implausible plot is offset by a commanding performance from Gene Hackman, reunited with director Arthur Penn."
