= The Admiral's Daughter =

1979 book by Victoria Fyodorova

- First US edition
- Author: Victoria Fyodorova
- Genre: Autobiography
- Publisher: Delacorte Press
- Publication date: 1979

The Admiral's Daughter is a 1979 autobiography written by Victoria Fyodorova with Haskel Frankel. It relates the story of Fyodorova's parents, Jackson Tate and Zoya Fyodorova, who had an affair in Moscow in 1945, her childhood in the Soviet Union, and her later search for and reunion with her father in the United States.

== Background ==
Zoya Fyodorova was a well-known Soviet actress starting in the 1930s. In 1945, she met United States Navy Captain Jackson R. Tate, a deputy attaché who was stationed in Moscow, and they had an affair. Tate was warned to end the relationship by secret police. When Soviet leader Joseph Stalin learned of the affair, Tate was declared an unwelcome person and expelled from Moscow, and Zoya Fyodorova was arrested and sent to Siberia for 8 years. Their daughter, Victoria, was born January 8, 1946, and was named for V-E Day.

== Reunion ==
University of Connecticut professor Irene Kirk learned of Victoria's story in 1959 and spent years trying to find Tate in the United States. Tate was unaware of having a daughter and of his former lover's arrest and imprisonment. When Kirk found Tate in 1973, she carried correspondence between the two back and forth to Moscow. In 1974, Tate began a campaign to convince the Soviet government to allow his daughter to travel to see him in the United States.

The story of Tate's attempts to reunite with his daughter gained worldwide attention and after a personal appeal by Leonid Brezhnev, Victoria was granted permission to leave the Soviet Union, arriving in the United States in March 1975 on a three-month travel visa. She spent several weeks in seclusion in Florida with Tate.

== Reception ==
Los Angeles Times book critic Robert Kirsch called the book "padded beyond belief", and wrote that it was more suited for a magazine article or newspaper miniseries. Baltimore Sun critic Retta Blaney called it "incredible" and "interesting".
