= Jackson Tate =

United States Navy admiral (1889–1978)

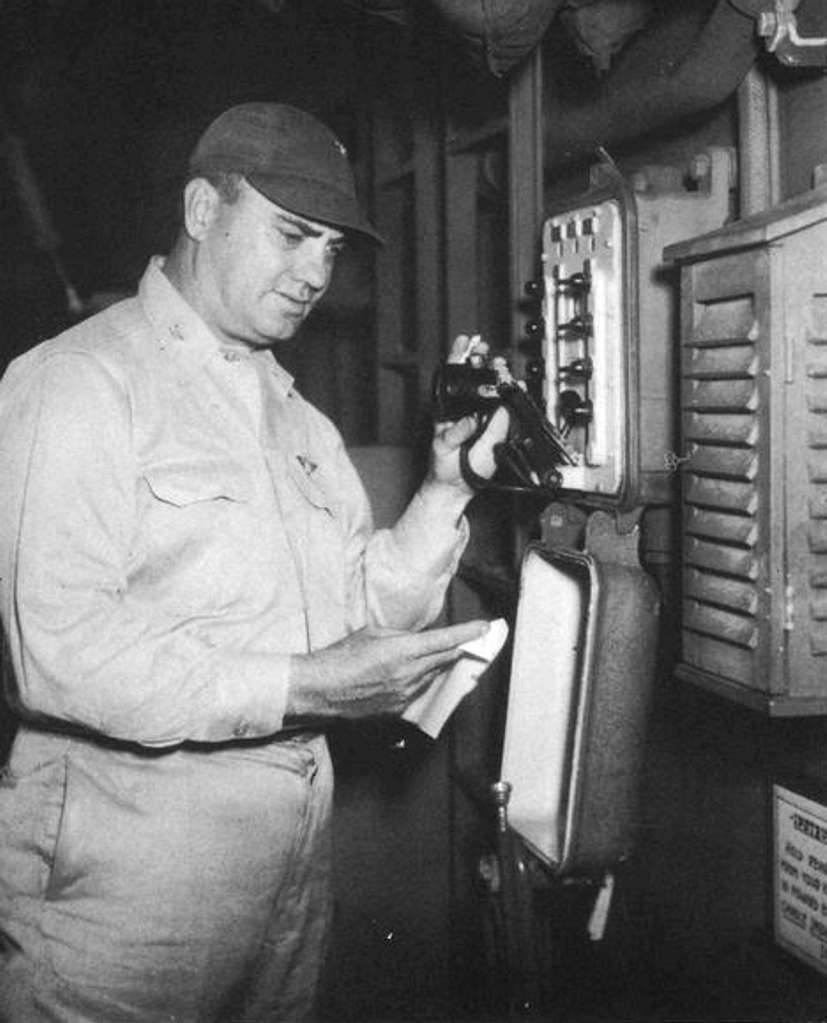
- Captain Jackson R. Tate in August 1945
- Born: Jackson Rogers Tate; October 15, 1898
- Died: July 19, 1978 (aged 79) Orange Park, Florida
- Allegiance: United States
- Branch: United States Navy

Jackson Rogers Tate (October 15, 1898 – July 19, 1978) was a United States Navy admiral who began his naval career as an enlisted man and became one of the first naval aviators. He fathered a child, Victoria, during a brief love affair with Russian actress Zoya Fyodorova near the end of World War II, but did not know of her birth until 1973. He waged a successful two-year diplomatic quest for her to be allowed to visit him in the United States, finally meeting her in 1975. Her story is told in The Admiral's Daughter.

== Early life and career ==
Tate enlisted in the Navy before World War I. As a lieutenant (jg) in 1923, he was assigned to an aircraft squadron. In 1940, as a lieutenant commander, he was assigned as an air officer aboard the USS Yorktown. He was later Commanding Officer of USS Randolph from July 25, 1945 – September 22, 1946.

== Russian affair ==
In 1945, Captain Tate was a deputy attaché who was stationed in Moscow, where he met well-known Russian actress Zoya Fyodorova at the U.S. Embassy. Tate was warned to end the relationship by secret police. When Soviet leader Joseph Stalin learned of the affair, Tate was declared an unwelcome person and expelled from Moscow, and Fyodorova was arrested and, after a pre-trial detention in the Lubyanka and Lefortovo prisons, sentenced for "espionage" to 25 years in strict regime camp (with the replacement of the imprisonment in the Vladimir prison), confiscation of property and exile for the whole family. Their daughter, Victoria, was born January 6, 1946, and was named for V-E Day.

== Reunion ==
University of Connecticut professor Irene Kirk learned of Victoria's story in 1959 and spent years trying to find Tate in the United States. Tate was unaware of having a daughter and of his former lover's arrest and imprisonment. When Kirk found Tate in 1973, she carried correspondence between the two back and forth to Moscow. In 1974, Tate began a campaign to convince the Soviet government to allow his daughter to travel to see him in the United States. She was granted permission and arrived in the United States in March 1975 on a three-month travel visa. She spent several weeks in seclusion in Florida with Tate.

== Personal ==
The movie Hell Divers was based on a book written by Tate, who also flew stunts for the movie.

Tate suffered heart ailments and had open heart surgery in the last years of his life and died of cancer on July 19, 1978, in Orange Park, Florida. He was survived by his wife, Hazel, his daughter, Victoria, and a son, Hugh.

== See also ==
- "Vicky, the Admiral's Daughter, Comes from Russia with Love". People. May 5, 1975.
