= Ruth Bonner =

Soviet Communist activist

Ruf Grigorievna Bonner
- Руфь Григорьевна Боннер
- Born: 18 August 1900
- Died: 25 December 1987 (aged 87); Moscow

Ruf Grigorievna Bonner (Russian: Руфь Григорьевна Боннер; 18 August 1900 – 25 December 1987), also known as Ruth Bonner, was a Soviet Communist activist who spent eight years in a labor camp during Joseph Stalin's Great Purge. She was the mother of the human rights activist Yelena Bonner and the mother-in-law of physicist and dissident Andrei Sakharov.

== Biography ==
Bonner was born in 1900 into a Russian Jewish family in Siberia. Her mother, Tatiana Matveyevna Bonner, née Rubinstein (1879–1942) was widowed and left with three small children.

Bonner's first husband was Armenian Levon Sarkisovich Kocharian, who died when Yelena was a year old.

In the 1930s, Bonner was a health official in the Communist Party committee of Moscow while her second husband, Gevorg Alikhanyan, aka Georgy Alikhanov, was a director at the Comintern. As part of Stalin's mass purges in 1937, her husband was arrested on charges of espionage and sentenced to death.

Bonner was arrested a few days after her husband and spent the next eight years in the Gulag near Karaganda, Kazakhstan. After her release she spent another nine years in internal exile. In 1954 she was one of the first of Stalin's victims to be rehabilitated under the new Soviet leader Nikita Khrushchev. Her husband was rehabilitated posthumously.

When her daughter Yelena and her son-in-law Andrei Sakharov were exiled to Gorky in 1980, she was allowed to move to the United States to be with her grandchildren. She returned to Moscow in June 1987 to live with her daughter, whose exile had been lifted by Mikhail Gorbachev in December 1986. She died in Moscow on 25 December 1987, aged 87.
