= Zoya Fyodorova =

Russian actress (1907–1981)

- Зоя Фёдорова
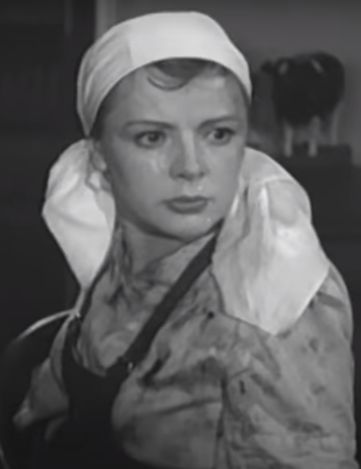
- Fyodorova in 1939
- Born: Zoya Alekseyevna Fyodorova; 21 December [O.S. 8 December] 1907; Saint Petersburg, Russian Empire
- Died: 11 December 1981 (aged 73); Moscow, Russian SFSR, Soviet Union
- Occupation: Actress

Zoya Alekseyevna Fyodorova (also Fedorova) (Russian: Зоя Алексеевна Федорова; 21 December [O.S. 8 December] 1907 – 11 December 1981) was a Russian film star who had an affair with American Navy captain Jackson Tate in 1945 and bore a child, Victoria Fyodorova, in January 1946. Having rejected the advances of NKVD police head Lavrentiy Beria, the affair was exposed resulting, initially, in a death sentence later reprieved to work camp imprisonment in Siberia; she was released after eight years. She was murdered in her Moscow apartment in 1981. The year before Fyodorova was murdered, she appeared in Moscow Does Not Believe in Tears, which won an Academy Award for Best Foreign Language Film in 1980.

== Early life ==
Zoya Alekseevna Fyodorova was born on 21 December 1907, in St. Petersburg. The family of the future actress was far from any form of art: Zoya's father Alexei Fyodorov was a worker, and after the revolution, he became the head of the passport service in the Kremlin; His wife was a housewife. Fyodorovs moved to the capital when young Zoya was nine years old. Artistic by nature, Zoya dreamed of being an actress since childhood and was successful in the school theatre group, but her parents considered the girl's hobby to be a whim. Under pressure from her father, Zoya got a job as a clerk in the USSR State Insurance, but she did not abandon her dream of becoming an actress, and in 1930 she entered a school at the Revolution Theatre (now Mayakovsky Theatre). The talented student, Zoya quickly attracted the attention of directors and began her career with cameo roles in Counterplan (1932) and Accordion (1934).

== Career ==
Fyodorova was a well-known Russian film star starting in the 1930s, and some of the movies she appeared in were also seen in the United States, including Girl Friends, her first major role after graduating from drama school. Zoya's personal life was as hectic as her career: as a student, she married actor Leonid Weizler, but the marriage soon fell apart. Her second marriage, to actor Vladimir Rapoport, was also failed, while her third marriage came to an end when her husband, the hero of the Soviet Union pilot Ivan Kleschev, died in 1942. In 1936, Zoya's mother developed cancer, causing Zoya's father Alexei Fyodorov to appeal to a German doctor, although Zoya's mother ended up passing away. In 1938, Alexei Fyodorov was denounced for his contact with the German doctor was accused of spying for Germany and England and sentenced to ten years in an osoblag. To rescue her father, Zoya Fyodorova, who had become a winner of the Stalin Prize by that time, reached out to Lavrentiy Beria, a people's commissar of Internal Affairs. Beria was a fan of Fyodorova and thus helped with the early release of her father. In addition, according to some reports, Beria suggested that Zoya join the subversive detachment, and Zoya agreed.

In 1941, Alexei Fyodorov was released due to his "incapacity" as his fingers were amputated on both hands, which he froze off in the osoblag. Fedorov died three months later.

== Beria ==
Federova became the object of close attention and harassment of Beria. Once, under the pretext of his wife's anniversary, he invited Zoya to his house on Kachalova Street, although neither the wife herself nor the guests were there. Beria immediately began to make unambiguous hints to Fedorova. Tired of fighting off the commissar, the actress insulted him and left. At she exited the house, the doorman handed her a bouquet, and Beria, who was watching the leaving Fyodorova, shouted after her that this was "not a bouquet, but a wreath."

== Tate ==
In 1945, a fateful meeting took place in the life of Fyodorova: at a reception in honour of the Day of the Red Army, she met the head of the US military mission, 46-year-old Jackson Tate. Their relationship lasted only a year, but Tate became the father of the actress's only child, daughter Victoria. In 1946, Tate was expelled from the USSR. Zoya did not have time to inform him about the pregnancy, and Tate only found out about his daughter in 1964. Meanwhile, Zoya realized that after the expulsion of Jackson, the danger was threatening her: the role in the stage play was given to another actress, and the portrait of Fyodorova was removed from the theatrical foyer.

Soon the actress was accused of espionage in favor of the United States and was placed in the Lefortovo detention center. There, Zoya was scalded with boiling water in the shower, and then her fingers were broken, suspecting that she was planning to commit suicide.

By a court verdict in 1947, all property and money were confiscated from Zoya and, despite her poor health and the existence of an infant daughter, was sent to Temlag for 25 years. After a short time, she was transferred to a prison in Chelyabinsk, and then to the famous Vladimir Central. Among the actress's cellmates was the singer Lydia Ruslanova, who was imprisoned because of the sensational "Trophy Case" (The campaign of the state security bodies of the USSR aimed at identifying abuses of power by the generals. One of the defendants was Marshal of the Soviet Union Georgy Zhukov).

Despite Lydia's support, Zoya had a hard time in prison. Out of despair, she tried to ask for help from Beria, but the vengeful People's Commissar remained indifferent to the pleas of the former favourite. The fragment of one of Fyodorova's letters: "I am asking you for help, save me. Difficult moments have come for me, even more than difficult, I would say - deadly... Save me! I understood my mistakes well and I appeal to you as to my own father. Bring me back to life ... Why should I die?" During her imprisonment, she continued to perform in the Gulag theatres.

The sad fate of Fedorova was shared by her two sisters. Maria was sentenced to ten years of work at a brick factory in Vorkuta; she died in 1952, having served half of her sentence. Alexandra was exiled to the Kazakh village of Poludino. She took into the care of Zoya's daughter Victoria, whom she raised with her children as her own.

== Release ==
After serving eight years, Zoya Fedorova was rehabilitated on 23 February 1955. She had nowhere to live, so Lydia Ruslanova sheltered her. When Alexandra and her children returned to Moscow, Zoya took nine-year-old Victoria to Ruslanova's apartment. The girl had to get used to the fact that her real mother was Zoya. Soon Fedorova was allocated a small two-room apartment on the Taras Shevchenko embankment.

The years in prison destroyed Fyodorova's acting career: she managed to get a job in the troupe of the Theater-Studio of Cinema Actors (now National Film Actors' Theatre), but she was invited to the cinema only for filming in small and secondary roles. However, the audience still loved her for her talent and brilliant acting. The last motion picture, where the actress appeared in a cameo role, was Moscow Does Not Believe in Tears (1980) which won an Academy Award for Best Foreign Language Film in 1980. In 1965, Fedorova was awarded the title of Honored Artist of the RSFSR. However, the acting profession brought little money, and the Fyodorov family lived modestly.

Everything changed in the mid-70s: Fyodorova received a good three-room apartment in the "uneasy" building on Kutuzovsky Prospekt. Judging by the furnishings, a large number of antiques, and the originals of paintings of famous artists on the walls, the financial health of the actress had improved significantly. This was facilitated by connections: Fedorova made friends with Galina, the daughter of Secretary General Leonid Brezhnev, and Svetlana, the wife of Interior Minister Nikolai Shchelokov, who were her housemates on the Taras Shevchenko embankment.

At the suggestion of Brezhneva, literally obsessed with diamonds, Fyodorova began speculating in precious stones, gold, antiques, and rare paintings. Among her clients were mainly high-ranking officials and their relatives. The scheme worked flawlessly: Brezhneva recognized when a jump in jewellery prices was planned and gave a signal to her friends; they quickly bought up jewellery: the purchase price sometimes amounted to hundreds of thousands of rubles (the average salary in those years was 150 rubles), but speculators knew: after a jump in prices, their profit on the resale of goods would exceed the amount spent by 50, and possibly 100 per cent.

== Reunion ==
University of Connecticut professor Irene Kirk learned of Victoria's story in 1959 and spent years trying to find Tate in the United States. Tate was unaware of having a daughter and of his former lover's arrest and imprisonment. When Kirk found Tate in 1973, she carried correspondence between the two back and forth to Moscow. In 1974, Tate began a campaign to convince the Soviet government to allow his daughter to travel to see him in the United States. Victoria was granted permission and arrived in the United States in March 1975 on a three-month travel visa, and spent several weeks in seclusion in Florida with Tate. Victoria married an American during her visit, and thus remained in the United States rather than returning to the USSR.

In 1976, Fyodorova travelled to the United States to be with Victoria as she had given birth to a son named Christopher. The visit also caused Fyodorova to reunite with Tate. Upon returning to the Soviet Union, Fyodorova also decided to emigrate to the United States, but several attempts to obtain documents to leave the USSR failed. Nevertheless, according to some reports, in early 1981, she had managed to obtain her documents, only for her to be denied an exit visa by the Soviet government to leave the country and visit her daughter. The reason they gave was that her daughter had "behaved badly", referring to her book describing her parents' affair, The Admiral's Daughter, previously published in 1979.

During one of the telephone conversations Zoya had with her daughter, she claimed “I will be killed soon”, although Victoria reportedly did not attach any importance to these words.

== Later life and death ==
Fyodorova lived in the Kutuzovsky Prospekt in Moscow. On the night of 10 December, Zoya spoke on the phone with one of her friends about the upcoming trip to Krasnodar, and at about 13:00 the actress received a call from a Mosfilm employee. After that, 71-year-old Zoya Fyodorova stopped communicating with family and friends: she did not open the door, and her phone was constantly busy. One of Fyodorova's friends, Margarita Nabokova, with whom Zoya had an appointment, came to her apartment twice, after which she left a note at the door. She contacted Yuri, the nephew of the actress (he had spare keys), and asked him to urgently come to Kutuzovsky Prospekt. Arriving, Yuri noticed that a light was on in the windows of Fyodorova's apartment, but the door was not opened for him, so he used the spare keys. A shocking picture awaited him in the apartment: the dead actress was sitting in an armchair, and in her hand, she had a telephone receiver.

As the investigators found later, Zoya was killed by a shot in the back of the head from a distance of about 10–20 cm (3.9–7.9 in): the bullet went right through, piercing her left eye and the glass of her glasses on her nose. After the murder of Fyodorova, her relatives recalled a strange detail: shortly before her death, Zoya complained that recently someone had been sending her photographs of the gouged-out eye by mail. No one was seen entering or exiting the apartment and the case remains unsolved. Her death was first reported in the American press as being an apparent heart attack.

== Investigation ==
The hair on the back of the deceased's head at the site of the wound was neatly set; this initially confused the operatives who arrived at the apartment. When the operatives began to examine Fedorova's face, they realized that she had been shot. The ballista found that they were firing from a German Sauer 38H self-loading pistol. All the owners of such weapons were immediately found, and the pistols were registered with only three citizens, but all of them were deemed to have not been involved in the murder. The investigation was also hindered by the fact that Fyodorova was shot when the phone rang in the apartment and she picked up the receiver because it was not possible to establish the subscriber's number.

There were no signs of a burglary on the door lock: Fyodorova herself let her killer in, which was indirectly indicated by the fact that there were two cups and a plate of cakes on the table. All the relatives of the murdered woman immediately fell under suspicion, including the young grand-nephew, who was removed from the school lesson for interrogation.

Investigators did not rule out that Fyodorova's nephew Yuri could have killed her, but he had a strong alibi: on the day of the crime, he was at a reporting and election conference. However, despite this, Yuri was taken into custody for some time, because it was assumed that he was the instigator of the crime.

Some of Fyodorova's friends recalled that on 10 December, she was expecting a certain guest from France, whose name she did not name. Other witnesses claimed that Fyodorova was expecting a friend from Stary Arbat Street, whose son lived in the United States. This friend was going to go to her son, and the actress planned to transfer jewellery for Victoria through her. At the same time, the concierge who worked at the entrance told the investigators that on that fateful day, only Nabokova and her nephew came to Fyodorova and there were no other visitors.

== Search ==
The detectives assumed that the criminal entered through the attic and left the crime scene in the same way. After checking Fyodorova's notebook lying next to the body, the investigators were amazed: it contained more than two thousand telephone numbers and about 1.5 thousand postal addresses in Moscow and other cities.

There were no obvious traces of a robbery in the apartment, but a ring worth 50 thousand rubles, silverware, and Matisse's original painting disappeared. Soon the police managed to get on the trail of the speculator who sold the missing ring to Fyodorova. Seeing the police, the speculator tried to run out in a taxi. The investigator Boris Krivoshein stopped the first passing car and ordered the driver to chase the taxi, and then ram it, although the taxi driver realized what the pursuer was up to and stopped. As a result, the speculator was detained, but he was deemed to not have been involved in the murder of Zoya Fyodorova.

During a search of the artist's apartment, the operatives noticed that there were many tags from jewellery on the floor and the shelves, but the detectives never found the jewellery itself. But they found a tiny secret storage room, which was packed with purses. The operatives found three thousand rubles in one of them, a gold chain in another, the rest were empty.

== Aftermath and rumours ==
The elimination of Zoya Fyodorova also was attributed to the KGB. Rumours that the actress was working with the Chekists had been circulating since the 1940s; she was allegedly recruited back in 1927, after being arrested in the Prove Case. Then the hit was taken off by Genrikh Yagoda, the head of the Joint State Political Directorate, who ordered to leave the actress alone: "The investigation failed to establish the charge incriminated to citizen Fedorova, and therefore would consider the case on Fedorova's accusation by the investigation to be terminated and transferred to the archive."

During one of Fyodorova's visits to the United States, the actress managed to secretly take out small precious stones from the USSR, sell them overseas, and give all the money to her daughter. On another trip, she bought several nylon fur coats for a little money. Fyodorova resold these fur coats in the Soviet Union for 500 rubles each. During her transplants in Paris, she met with a Soviet dancer, Rudolf Nureyev, who settled in the West. Fyodorova sold him paintings and jewellery. It was rumoured that the KGB had provided the opportunity for such speculations.

The investigation into the murder of the actress was conducted for about two years. Six months later, it was transferred from the Ministry of Internal Affairs to the KGB and classified. During the entire investigation, about four thousand witnesses were interviewed. But the case never came to court, falling apart at the stage of collecting evidence. Several years ago, the grandson of Zoya Fyodorova, who flew in from the United States, appealed to the Prosecutor General's Office of Russia with a request to recognize him as a victim in the case and resume the investigation into the murder of the actress, but this was never done.

Zoya Fyodorova was buried at Vagankovsky cemetery, with only child Victoria was unable to attend the funeral. According to some reports, the Soviet authorities did not give Victoria permission to enter the country, although other reports stated Victoria chose not to return to the USSR out of fear for her life. Victoria died in the United States in 2012 at the age of sixty-six.

== Variations ==
Screenwriter Eduard Volodarsky expressed his version of the crime: in his opinion, Fedorova could have been dealt with by her son-in-law, a pilot who often flew from New York to Moscow. In theory, he could have come to his mother-in-law, shot her and taken the valuables. Accidentally or not, it was after the death of Fedorova that her son-in-law became a major entrepreneur.

In the documentary Diamond Hunters (2011), from the series The Investigation, the opinion is expressed that Fyodorova was killed by Odessa raider Anatoly Betz. In the Galina TV series, it starred Raisa Konyukhova.

Yulian Semyonov wrote The Mystery of Kutuzovsky Prospect novel based on this murder.

In 2010, director Vitaly Pavlov shot the television series Zoya based on the biography of Zoya Fedorova starring Irina Pegova.

== Selected filmography ==
- Counterplan (Встречный, 1932) as Chutochkin's wife (deleting scenes)
- Girl Friends (Подруги, 1936) as Zoya
- The Great Citizen (Великий гражданин, 1938) as Nadya
- The Wedding (Свадьба, 1944) as Dasha, bride
- The Girl Without an Address (Девушка без адреса, 1957) as Komarinskaya
- A Groom from the Other World (Жених с того света, 1958) as chief medical officer
- Scarlet Sails (Алые паруса, 1961) as Governess
- A Tale of Lost Times (Сказка о потерянном времени, 1964) as aunt Natasha
- Give Me a Book of Complaints (Дайте жалобную книгу, 1965) as Yekaterina Ivanovna
- Operation Y and Shurik's Other Adventures (Операция «Ы» и другие приключения Шурика, 1965) as Lida's Neighbor
- Wedding in Malinovka (Свадьба в Малиновке, 1967) as Gorpina Dormidontovna
- Russian Field (Русское поле, 1971) as Matrona
- Moscow Does Not Believe in Tears (Москва слеза не верит, 1979) as Hostel's Security

== See also ==
- List of unsolved murders (1980–1999)
