= Theater of Mimicry and Gesture =

Theatre in Moscow, Russia

- Театр мимики и жеста
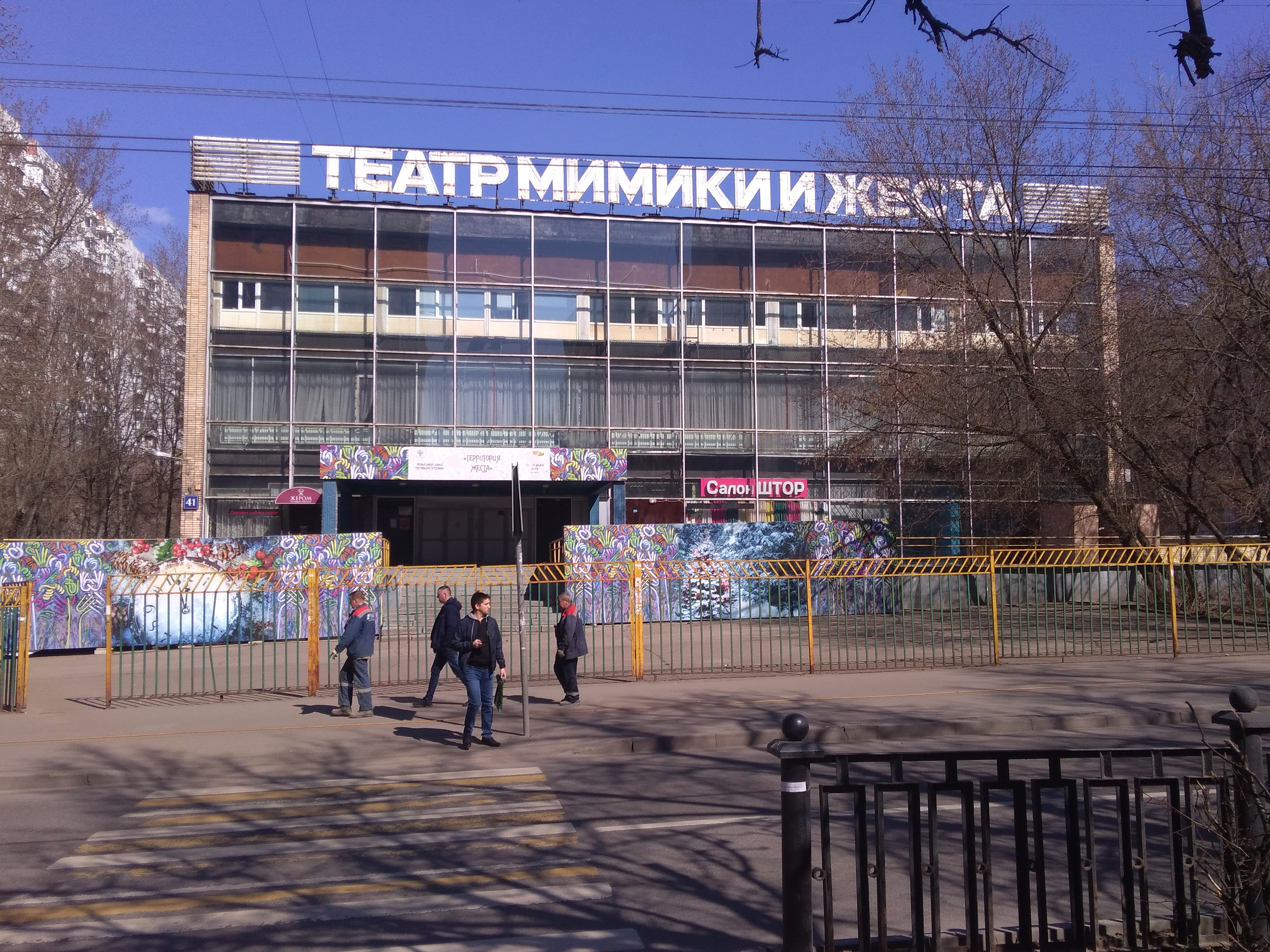
- Interactive map of Theater of Mimicry and Gesture
- Address: Izmailovsky bulv., 39/41; Moscow; Russia
- Coordinates: 55°43′22″N 37°48′51″E

Construction
- Opened: 1963

Website
- teatrmig.ru

The Theater of Mimicry and Gesture (Russian: Театр Мимики и Жеста) is a theater located in the Izmaylovo District of Moscow, Russia. Its actors perform primarily in the Russian Sign Language, with translation into spoken Russian.

The theater was established in 1917 in Petrograd and moved to Moscow in the next year. It was closed during the Second World War, but reopened after it. In 1962, the Soviet government started officially subsidizing it. One of the reasons for the upgrade was the influence of the popular Soviet composer Vasily Solovyov-Sedoy, whose deaf daughter wanted to be an actress.

Personal stories of this theater's actresses inspired the films Two in Love (1965) and Country of the Deaf (1998). Some of its actors received the Merited Artist of the Russian Federation award.
