= Victoria Fyodorova =

American actress

Fyodorova in Yulya's Diary (1980)

Victoria Fyodorova (formerly Pouy; January 18, 1946 – September 5, 2012) was a Russian-American actress and author. She was born shortly after World War II to Jackson Tate (1898–1978), then a captain in the United States Navy, and Russian actress Zoya Fyodorova (1909–1981), who had a brief affair before Tate was expelled from Moscow by Joseph Stalin. Victoria Fyodorova wrote the 1979 book, The Admiral's Daughter, which was about her experience attempting to reunite with her father.

== Early life ==
Fyodorova's mother, Zoya Fyodorova, was a well-known Soviet actress starting in the 1930s. In 1945, she met United States Navy Captain Jackson R. Tate (died 1978), a State Department deputy attaché stationed in Moscow; and they had an affair. Tate was warned to end the relationship by the Soviet Secret Police. Victoria was allegedly fathered on the day of World War II end celebration May 9, 1945.

When Stalin (or Lavrenty Beria) learned of the affair, Tate was declared persona non grata and expelled from Russia. Zoya Fyodorova was arrested and sent to Siberia for eight years. Their daughter, Victoria, was named for V-E Day. Victoria lived with her mother's sister in the Kazakh SSR until she was 8 years old, when her mother was released, not long after Stalin's death in 1953.

Victoria was also an actress in Russia, as her mother had been. She appeared in a number of well-received films, including a 1970 adaptation of Crime and Punishment. She was married briefly and divorced.

== Reunion ==
University of Connecticut professor Irene Kirk learned of Victoria's story in 1959 and spent years trying to find Tate in the United States. Tate was unaware of having a daughter and of his former lover's arrest and imprisonment. When Kirk found Tate in 1973, she carried correspondence back and forth between the two.

In 1974, Tate began a campaign to convince the Soviet government to allow his daughter to travel to see him. She was granted permission and arrived in the United States in March 1975 on a three-month travel visa. She spent several weeks in seclusion with her father in Florida. While in the United States, she met Frederick Pouy, a pilot for Pan American World Airways; and they married on June 7, 1975, in Stamford, Connecticut, days before her visa was to expire. Their son, Christopher Alexander Fyodor Pouy, was born on May 3, 1976. Zoya Fyodorova petitioned the Soviet government and was allowed to travel to the U.S. to be with her daughter for the birth. Zoya died from a gunshot wound in 1981 under suspicious circumstances. The murder case was not solved and perpetrator was not found. Some alleged that KGB was behind it.

== Later life ==
Victoria Fyodorova settled in Stamford, Connecticut. She appeared as a Russian doctor in an episode of Medical Center in 1975, and in the 1985 movie Target. She and Pouy divorced in 1990. Fyodorova died from lung cancer on September 5, 2012 in Greenwich Township, Pennsylvania.

== Selected filmography ==
- 1964 — Goodbye, Boys as Zhenya
- 1965 — Two in Love as Natasha
- 1970 — Crime and Punishment as Avdotya Romanovna
- 1970 — About Love as Galina
- 1980 — Yulya’s Diary as Julia Voznesenskaya
- 1985 — Target as Lise
- 1986 — MacGyver as Victoria Tomanova

== Bibliography ==
- Fyodorova, Victoria; Frankel, Haskel (1979). The Admiral's Daughter. Delacorte Press. p. 372. ISBN 0-440-00366-0.

== See also ==
- Victoria Fyodorova at IMDb
- Victoria Fyodorova bio at Lifeactor.ru (in Russian)
- "Vicky, the Admiral's Daughter, Comes from Russia with Love". People. 1975-05-05.
