= Gevorg Alikhanyan =

Soviet Armenian politician and statesman (1897–1938)

- Գևորգ Ալիխանյան
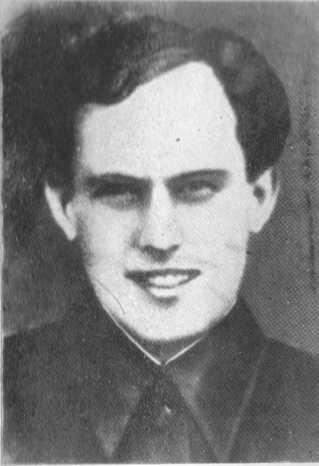

Head of the Cadre Department of the Executive Committee of Communist International
- In office 1935–1937

First Secretary of the Communist Party of Armenia
- In office December 31, 1920–April 1921
- Preceded by: position created
- Succeeded by: Askanaz Mravyan

Personal details
- Born: Gevorg Sargsi Alikhanyan; 1897 Tiflis, Tiflis Governorate, Russian Empire (now Tbilisi, Georgia)
- Died: February 13, 1938 (aged 40–41) Kommunarka Shooting Ground, Moscow, Russian SFSR, USSR
- Party: Communist Party of Armenia
- Children: Yelena Bonner

Gevorg Sargsi Alikhanyan (Armenian: Գևորգ Սարգսի Ալիխանյան) (1897–1938), also known in Russian as Gevork Alikhanyan (Russian: Геворк Алиханян) or Georgy Alikhanov (Russian: Георгий Алиханов), was a Soviet Armenian politician and statesman. Alikhanyan is best known for being the founding First Secretary of the Communist Party of Armenia from 1920 to 1921. He was also a high-ranking member of Comintern before his arrest and execution during the Great Purge.

== Early life ==
Gevorg Alikhanyan was born in 1897 in Tiflis in the Russian Empire (modern day Tbilisi, Georgia) to an Armenian worker's family. He studied at Nersisian School in Tbilisi, where he befriended Anastas Mikoyan, a fellow Armenian student with similar communist ideals who would later become head of state of the Soviet Union. Alikhanyan was expelled for revolutionary activity in 1915.

During World War I, Alikhanyan volunteered to serve in the Imperial Russian Army on the Caucasian Front. Originally, he was politically oriented towards the Armenian Revolutionary Federation. However, inspired by Mikoyan, he switched parties and joined the Bolshevik faction of the Russian Social Democratic Labour Party (RSDLP) in March 1917.

== Party career ==
In 1917–1918, Alikhanyan worked in the Tiflis Committee of the party. He then moved to Baku and worked there as a party organizer for one of the city's districts. Alikhanyan was an active participant in the Baku Commune. In 1919, he moved back to Tiflis and was elected a member and secretary of the Tiflis Committee. It was in this position that he was twice arrested and thrown into prison, where he stayed until March 1920.

When the Communist Party of Armenia was established in 1920, Alikhanyan was chosen as its inaugural First Secretary. He served in this position for the first four months of 1921, before being succeeded by Askanaz Mravyan.

In May 1920, he was transferred to Moscow, where he worked as the head of the agitation and propaganda department of the Bauman regional committee of the party. In 1922–1925, he worked in Leningrad as the head of the organizational department of the Vasilyevsky Island regional committee. As a deputy from the Leningrad party organization, he participated in the 12th and 13th congresses of the party. In Leningrad, Alikhanyan sharply criticized Grigory Zinoviev at meetings and in the press, for which he was expelled from the region and sent to work in Siberia. There he was elected secretary of the regional committee of the Chita District.

Through the intercession of Sergei Kirov, Alikhanyan was recalled in 1926 and returned to work in Leningrad, first as the head of the organizational department of the Volodarsky District Party Committee and then as the head of the Vyborg District Party Committee. He was elected a deputy to the 15th and 16th Bolshevik party congresses in 1927 and 1930 respectively.

From 1928 to 1930, Alikhanyan studied Marxism at the Communist Academy in Moscow. He served as secretary of the Bailovo regional committee in Baku in 1930. He was then sent to Tashkent, where he worked as the deputy head of the organizational department of the Party's Central Asian Bureau until June 1931. Afterwards, he was recalled to Moscow, where he was promoted to the Executive Council of the Communist International (ECCI) as the head of the Cadre Department. In 1935, he was a delegate to the 7th World Congress of the Comintern.

During his time in the ECCI, he was one of the senior party members responsible for perpetrating the false allegations that led to the arrest and execution of Hungarian communist Lajos Magyar for allegedly assassinating Kirov. However, as an employee of the Comintern, he also protected Josip Broz Tito from repression.

== Arrest, death and rehabilitation ==
On May 27, 1937, Alikhanyan was arrested by the NKVD on the orders of Ivan Serov and Lavrentiy Beria, charged with allowing "undesirables" into the organization and suppressing criticism of his department. He was found guilty of "participation in a counter-revolutionary terrorist organization" by the Supreme Court of the Soviet Union and subsequently sentenced to death.

He was executed on February 13, 1938, at the Kommunarka shooting ground in Moscow. He was rehabilitated posthumously on October 24, 1954, during Nikita Khrushchev's Thaw.

== Personal life ==
Alikhanyan was married twice. Reliable information about his first wife is scant. In 1924, Alikhanyan married Ruth Bonner, a Jewish pro-communist activist from Siberia. Bonner had previously been married to Levon Kocharyan, an Armenian man from Nagorno-Karabakh, with whom she had a daughter named Lusik. Kocharyan died a year after Lusik's birth and Ruth married Alikhanyan, who adopted Lusik. Alikhanyan and his family resided in Moscow and Leningrad.

Ruth, who was arrested on December 10, 1937, was sentenced to eight years at the ALZhIR in the Gulag in the Akmola Region of Kazakhstan until 1946. Rehabilitated in 1954, she became one of the first Purge survivors to be rehabilitated by the Khrushchev government, along with her husband's posthumous rehabilitation shortly thereafter. She died in Moscow on December 25, 1987.

Lusik Alikhanova grew up to be known as Yelena Bonner, a prominent Soviet dissident and human rights activist. She married Nobel Prize winning physicist Andrei Sakharov in 1972 and faced internal exile several times.

== See also ==
- Armenian victims of the Great Purge
