= Yelena Bonner =

Human rights activist in the Soviet Union (1923–2011)

- Елена Боннэр
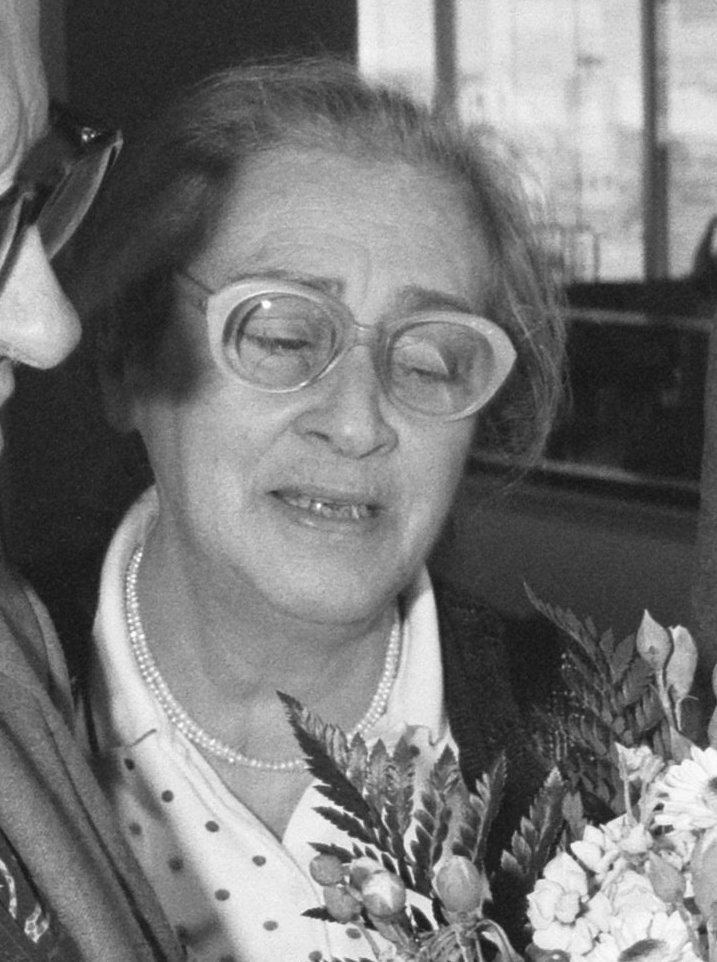
- Bonner in 1989
- Born: Lusik Georgiyevna Alikhanova; 15 February 1923; Merv, Turkestan ASSR, Russian SFSR, Soviet Union
- Died: 18 June 2011 (aged 88); Boston, Massachusetts, United States
- Citizenship: Soviet Union (1923–1991); Russian Federation (1991–2011)
- Education: Herzen State Pedagogical University of Russia, First Pavlov State Medical University of St. Peterburg
- Occupations: nurse during World War II, physician, human rights activist
- Known for: Human rights activism, participation in the Moscow Helsinki Group
- Movement: Dissident movement in the Soviet Union
- Spouses: Ivan Semyonov (until 1965); Andrei Sakharov (1972–1989; his death)
- Children: Tatyana Yankelevich (born 1950); Alexey Semyonov (born 1956)
- Awards: Rafto Prize; Robert Schuman Medal; Giuseppe Motta Medal; Order of the Cross of Terra Mariana; Order of Tomáš Garrigue Masaryk; Order of Merit of the Republic of Poland; Truman-Reagan Medal of Freedom

Yelena Georgiyevna Bonner (Russian: Елена Георгиевна Боннэр; 15 February 1923 – 18 June 2011) was a human rights activist in the former Soviet Union and wife of the physicist, activist and 1975 Nobel Peace Prize laureate Andrei Sakharov. During her decades as a dissident, Bonner was noted for her characteristic blunt honesty and courage.

== Biography ==
=== Early life and education ===
Lusik Georgiyevna Alikhanova was born in Merv, Turkestan ASSR, Soviet Union (now Mary, Turkmenistan). She was born to Ruf "Ruth" Bonner, a Jewish communist activist from Siberia, and Levon Kacharyan, an Armenian. Her father died a year after her birth, and her mother remarried to Gevorg Alikhanyan, founding First Secretary of the Communist Party of Armenia and a Comintern executive. She had a younger brother, Igor, who became a career naval officer. Her family had a summer dacha in Sestroretsk and Bonner had fond memories there.

In 1937, Bonner's father was arrested by the NKVD and killed as part of Stalin's Great Purge; her mother was arrested a few days later as the wife of an enemy of the people, and served ten years in the Gulag near Karaganda, Kazakhstan, followed by nine years of internal exile. Bonner's 41-year-old maternal uncle, Matvei Bonner, was also killed during the purge, and his wife internally exiled. All four were exonerated (rehabilitated) following Stalin's death in 1953. In 1941 she volunteered for the Red Army's Hospital when the Soviet Union was invaded, and she became head nurse. While serving during World War II, Bonner was wounded twice, and in 1946 was honorably discharged as a disabled veteran. In 1947 Bonner was accepted as student in the medical institute in Leningrad. After the war she earned a degree in pediatrics from the First Leningrad Medical Institute, presently First Pavlov State Medical University of St. Peterburg.

=== Marriage and children ===
In medical school she met her first husband, Ivan Semyonov. They had a daughter, Tatiana, in 1950, and a son, Alexey, in 1956. Her children immigrated to the United States in 1977 and 1978, respectively. Bonner and Semyonov separated in 1965, and eventually divorced.

In October 1970, while attending the trial of human rights activists Revol't (Ivanovich) Pimenov and Boris Vail in Kaluga, Bonner met Andrei Sakharov, a nuclear physicist and human rights activist; they married in 1972. The year before they met, 1969, Sakharov had been widowed from his wife, Klavdia Alekseyevna Vikhireva, with whom he had two daughters and a son.

=== Activism ===
Beginning as early as the 1940s, Bonner had helped political prisoners and their families. Although Bonner had joined the Soviet Communist Party in 1964 while she was working as a physician, only a few years later she was becoming active in the Soviet human rights movement. Her resolve towards dissidence was strengthened in August 1968 after Soviet bloc tanks rolled into Czechoslovakia in order to crush the Prague Spring movement. That event strengthened her belief that the system could not be reformed from within.

At the Kaluga trial in 1970, Bonner and Sakharov met Natan Sharansky and began working together to defend Jews sentenced to death for attempting an escape from the USSR in a hijacked plane. Under pressure from Sakharov, the Soviet regime permitted Yelena Bonner to travel to the West in 1975, 1977 and 1979 for treatment of her wartime eye injury. When Sakharov, awarded the 1975 Nobel Peace Prize, was barred from travel by the Soviet authorities, Bonner, in Italy for treatment, represented him at the ceremony in Oslo.

Bonner became a founding member of the Moscow Helsinki Group in 1976. When in January 1980 Sakharov was exiled to Gorky, a city closed to foreigners, the harassed and publicly denounced Bonner became his lifeline, traveling between Gorky and Moscow to bring out his writings. Her arrest in April 1984 for "anti-Soviet agitation and propaganda" and sentence to five years of exile in Gorky disrupted their lives again. Sakharov's several long and painful hunger strikes forced the new Soviet leader, Mikhail Gorbachev to let her travel to the U.S. in 1985 for sextuple bypass heart surgery. Prior to that, in 1981, Bonner and Sakharov went on a dangerous but ultimately successful hunger strike to get Soviet officials to allow their daughter-in-law, Yelizaveta Konstantinovna ("Lisa") Alexeyeva, an exit visa to join her husband, Bonner's son Alexei Semyonov, in the United States.

In December 1986, Gorbachev allowed Sakharov and Bonner to return to Moscow. Following Sakharov's death on 14 December 1989, she established the Andrei Sakharov Foundation, and the Sakharov Archives in Moscow. In 1993, she donated Sakharov papers in the West to Brandeis University in the U.S.; in 2004 they were turned over to Harvard University. Bonner remained outspoken on democracy and human rights in Russia and worldwide. She joined the defenders of the Russian parliament during the August Coup and supported Boris Yeltsin during the constitutional crisis in early 1993.

In 1994, outraged by what she called "genocide of the Chechen people", Bonner resigned from Yeltsin's Human Rights Commission and was an outspoken opponent to Russian armed involvement in Chechnya and critical of the Kremlin for allegedly returning to KGB-style authoritarianism under Vladimir Putin. She was also critical of the international "quartet" two-state solution to the Israel-Palestinian conflict and expressed fears about the rise of antisemitism in Europe. In 1999, Yelena Bonner received the Truman-Reagan Medal of Freedom.

Bonner was among the 34 first signatories of the online anti-Putin manifesto "Putin must go", published 10 March 2010. Her signature was the first.

=== Last years and death ===
From 2006, Bonner divided her time between Moscow and the United States, home to her two children, five grandchildren, one great-granddaughter, and one great-grandson. She died on 18 June 2011 of heart failure in Boston, Massachusetts, aged 88, according to her daughter, Tatiana Yankelevich. She had been hospitalized since 21 February.

== Works and awards ==
Bonner was the author of Alone Together (Knopf 1987), and Mothers and Daughters (Knopf 1992), and wrote frequently on Russia and human rights. She was a recipient of many international human rights awards, including the Rafto Prize in 1991, the European Parliament's Robert Schuman Medal in 2001, the awards of International Humanist and Ethical Union, the World Women's Alliance, the Adelaida Ristori Foundation, the U.S. National Endowment for Democracy, the Lithuanian Commemorative Medal of 13 January, the Czech Republic Order of Tomáš Garrigue Masaryk, and others.

She was also awarded the Giuseppe Motta Medal in 2004 for protection of human rights.

In 2005 Bonner participated in "They Chose Freedom", a four-part television documentary on the history of the Soviet dissident movement. Bonner was on the Board of Advancing Human Rights (NGO).

== Depiction in media ==
Bonner was portrayed by Glenda Jackson in the 1984 film Sakharov.

== Works ==
- Bonner, Elena (1988) [1986]. Alone together (3 ed.). New York: Vintage Books. ISBN 978-0-394-75538-0.
- Bonner, Elena (1986). Un exil partagé [A shared exile] (in French). Paris: Seuil. ISBN 978-2-02-009394-1.
- Bonner, Elena (1986). Soli insieme in esilio con Andrej Sacharov [Alone together in exile with Andrei Sakharov] (in Italian). Alessandria: Garzanti-Vallardi.
- Bonnėr, Elena (1987). לבד ביחד [Alone together] (in Hebrew). מסדה.
- Bonner, Jelena (1998) [1991]. In Einsamkeit vereint. Meine Jahre mit Andrej Sacharow in der Verbannung [Alone together. My years with Andrei Sakharov in exile] (in German) (2 ed.). München, Zürich: Piper. ISBN 978-3-492-11522-3.
- Bonner, Jelena (1993) [1992]. Mütter und Töchter – Erinnerungen an meine Jugend 1923 bis 1945 [Mothers and daughters – memories of my youth 1923–1945] (in German) (2 ed.). München, Zürich: Piper. ISBN 978-3-492-03440-1.
- Боннэр, Елена (1990). Постскриптум. Книга о горьковской ссылке [Postscript: A book about the Gorky exile] (in Russian). Moscow: Интербрук.
- Bonner, Elena (1991). Звонит колокол… Год без Андрея Сахарова [The bell tolls… A year without Andrei Sakharov] (in Russian). Moscow: ПИК.
- Bonner, Elena (1992). Mothers and daughters. Hutchinson. ISBN 978-0-09-174911-8.
- Bonner, Elena (1994). Дочки-матери [Mothers and daughters] (in Russian). Moscow: Прогресс, Литера. Archived from the original on 15 May 2013.
- Bonner, Elena (1996). Вольные заметки к родословной Андрея Сахарова [Free notes to the ancestry of Andrei Sakharov] (in Russian). Moscow: Права человека. ISBN 978-5-7712-0017-0.
- Cox, Caroline; Eibner, John; Bonnėr, Elena (1993). Ethnic cleansing in progress: war in Nagorno Karabakh. Institute for Religious Minorities in the Islamic World. ISBN 978-3-9520345-2-1.
- Bonner, Elena (2003). Madri e figlie [Mothers and daughters] (in Italian). Spirali. ISBN 978-88-7770-633-1.
- Glucksmann, André; Bonner, Elena (2013). На захисті свободи. Діалоги Андре Ґлюксмана з Оленою Боннер [Protecting freedom. Dialogues by André Glucksmann to Elena Bonner] (in Ukrainian). Kyiv: Дух і Літера. ISBN 978-966-378-313-0.
