= Matriname =

Surname received from a female ancestor

A matrilineal surname or matriname (Note: The word "matriname" was used in scientific literature (referring to "maternal surnames", actually) for many years before Professor Sykes' 2001 book.) is a family name inherited from one's mother, and maternal grandmother, and so on whose line of descent is called a mother-line, mitochondrial line, or matriline. A matriname passed on to subsequent issue is unchanged, as compared to a matronymic, which is derived from the first name of each new mother.

The term "matriname" was introduced by Prof. Bryan Sykes in his book The Seven Daughters of Eve, stating that "We would then all have three names: a first name, a surname and a new one, a matriname perhaps." (Note: Sykes uses "matriname", only, and states that women adding their own matriname to men's patriname (or "surname" as Sykes calls it) would really help in future genealogy work and historical-record searches. This suggests the double surname ideal. Sykes states on p. 292 that a woman's matriname will be handed down with her mtDNA, the main topic of his book.)

The mitochondrial DNA (mtDNA) is inherited by biological motherhood whereas the matriname can be equally given after adoption or surrogacy.

== Single surname ==
The usual lack of matrinames to pass on in patrilineal cultures makes traditional genealogy more difficult in the maternal line than in the paternal line. After all, father-line surnames originated partly to identify individuals clearly and were adopted partly for administrative reasons, (Note: For a more complete historical background, see Surname § History, especially its first sub-section, Modern Era..) and these patrinames help in searching for facts and documentation from centuries ago. Patrinames are stable identity-surnames, surnames which identify an individual, whether now or in the past or future; matrinames similarly are identity-surnames for women.

In the 1979 Convention on the Elimination of Discrimination Against Women (CEDAW) the UN holds the view, in item (g) of its Article 16, that women and men, and specifically wife and husband, have the same rights to choose a "family name" as well as a "profession" and an "occupation". These three rights are a small part of the document's long list of rights related to gender equality meant to ensure women have equal opportunities to men. However, the United States has signed but not yet ratified this UN Convention.

Sykes argues choosing a "family name", or surname, should mean combining a matriname with a patriname, to avoid discriminating against either women or men.

Some cultures have no surnames at all. If a culture has these then to not discriminate it combines both, as mentioned above; that is, the matriname and the patriname are both given in each child's birth record.

Note that one's resulting birth surname is one's legal surname, unless one changes the latter.

In several purely patrilineal cultures, including most of Europe, women traditionally change to their husband's patriname at marriage: see married and maiden names and name change.

== Double surname ==
Some cultures use both paternal and maternal surname, such as Spanish naming customs, Portuguese names, and the naming customs of Hispanic America. The patrilineal surname—patriname—taken from the mother in these patrilineal cultures does not qualify as a matriname. Instead, this Hispanic practice uses the maternal patriname.

Double surnames were discussed in The Seven Daughters of Eve. Double surnames were also used by one English family, along with the matriname "Phythian". In this case the mother has the birth double surname "Phythian-Adams", and the father has birth double surname "??-Monkhouse". They both choose to retain their birth double surnames unchanged throughout their lives. They agree to denominate all of their daughters and sons with the birth double surname "Phythian-Monkhouse": The mother passes on her matriname (and mtDNA), and symmetrically, the father passes on his patriname. All of their sons have the Y-DNA of and, accordingly, the patriname "Monkhouse" of their patriline, while all of the daughters have both the mtDNA of and, accordingly, the matriname "Phythian" of their matriline. (Note that most societies give all children of a family the same surname, as in this example.) Each person has only one identity-surname, which in this example is either "Phythian" or "Monkhouse". The identity-surname of each is stable throughout life and always half of whatever double surname(s) he or she assumes throughout life, including at birth and marriage(s).

The parents in this example share this one family name, "Phythian-Monkhouse".

One's own identity-surname (here, the matriname "Phythian" or the patriname "Monkhouse") are always available as one's own usage name, such as in one's profession/vocation.

In summary, gender-symmetric single surnames are simpler and briefer, but if used alone, give different surnames for members of the different genders in a nuclear family. In the double system, all of the children in a nuclear family have the same double surname. Also, the system generally records on all legal documents the matriname and patriname, with both identity-surnames later aiding each gender in genealogy and other searches of historical records.

== See also ==
- Double surname
- Extinction of surnames
- Family name
- Gender equality
- List of matrilineal or matrilocal societies
- List of people who adopted matrilineal surnames
- Lucy Stone League, on the topic of identity-surnames
- Maiden and married names
- Matrilineality
- Patrilineality
- Patronymic surname
- Women's rights
