= List of pseudonyms =

This is a list of pseudonyms, in various categories.

A pseudonym is a name adopted by a person for a particular purpose, which differs from their true name. A pseudonym may be used by social activists or politicians for political purposes or by others for religious purposes. It may be a soldier's nom de guerre or an author's nom de plume. It may be a performer's stage name or an alias used by visual artists, athletes, fashion designers, or criminals. Pseudonyms are occasionally used in fiction such as by superheroes or other fictional characters.

== General list ==
List of pseudonyms
Pseudonym	Real name	Notability	Notes
15	(unknown)	Software engineer	
Abel Djassi	Amílcar Cabral	Guinea-Bissauan politician	
ABOVE	Tavar Zawacki	American abstract artist	
Abu Ammar	Yasser Arafat	Palestinian president	
Abu Mohammad al-Julani	Ahmed al-Sharaa	Syrian president	
Abu Obaida	Hudayfa Samir Abdallah al-Kahlout (alleged by the United States)	Spokesperson of Izz ad-Din al-Qassam Brigades	
Acharya S	Dorothy Milne Murdock	American Christ myth theorist	
Adam Ant	Stuart Goddard	English Pop Musician	
Adi Da	Franklin Jones	American writer	
Al "Bummy" Davis	Abraham Davidoff	American boxer	
Alexander Supertramp	Christopher McCandless	American hiker	
Allan Kardec	Hippolyte Rivail	American religious figure	
Amor de Cosmos	William Smith	2nd premier of British Columbia, Canada	
Anarchasis Cloots	Jean-Baptiste du Val-de-Grâce	Prussian-French noble	
Anthony Garotinho	Anthony Matheus de Oliveira	Brazilian broadcaster, politician, and criminal	
Aristides	William Lloyd Garrison	American activist and journalist	
Arkan	Željko Ražnatović	Serbian soldier and criminal	
Armin S.	(unknown)	German financier	
Ary Ecilaw	Alexandrine Countess von Hutten-Czapska	Polish novelist	
Avicii	Tim Bergling	Swedish pop artist	
Baby Face George Nelson	Lester Gillis	American criminal	
Balthus	Balthazar Klossowski de Rola	French painter	
Banksy	(unknown)	England-based street artist, political activist, and film director	
Barefoot Bandit	Colton Harris-Moore	American former fugitive	
Basshunter	Jonas Altberg	Swedish singer, record producer, songwriter and DJ	
Bernard Shakey	Neil Young	Canadian musician	
Bhanusimha	Rabindranath Tagore	Poet, writer, playwright, composer, philosopher, social reformer and painter	
Billy the Kid	Henry McCarty	American criminal	
Black Bart	Charles Bowles	English-American criminal	
Bob Denard	Gilbert Bourgeaud	French mercenary	
Bono	Paul Hewson	Lead singer, U2	
Bór	Tadeusz Komorowski	Polish soldier	
Borelowski	Michał Grażyński	President of Związek Harcerstwa Polskiego	
Bramantino	Bartolomeo Suardi	Italian painter	
Brother Andre	André Bessette	Canadian priest and saint	
BTK	Dennis Rader	American serial killer	
Bugsy Siegel	Benjamin Siegelbaum	American criminal	
Butch Cassidy	Robert Parker	American criminal	
Cafu	Marcos Evangelista de Moraes	Brazilian footballer	
Caligula	Gajus Julius Caesar Augustus Germanicus	Roman emperor	
Calvin Harris	Adam Richard Wiles	Scottish DJ and record producer	
Canaletto	Giovanni Canale	Italian painter	
Caravaggio	Michelangelo Merisi	Italian painter	
Careca	Antônio de Oliveira Filho	Brazilian footballer	
Carlos Danger	Anthony Weiner	United States Congressperson	
Carlos the Jackal	Ilich Ramírez-Sánchez	Terrorist	
Caroline Marbouty	Claire Brunne	French writer	
Cassandre	Adolphe Mouron	French painter	
Celestilian	Ruben Torke	German author	
Chad Ochocinco	Chad Johnson	American footballer	
Cigoli	Lodovico Cardi	Italian painter	
Coco Chanel	Gabrielle Chanel	Fashion designer	
Colonel Tom Parker	Andreas van Kuijk	Musical entrepreneur	
Coldmirror	Kathrin Fricke	YouTube creator	
DAIM	Mirko Reisser	Graffiti artist	
Darius Paul Dassault	Darius Paul Bloch	French general	
D. B. Cooper	Unknown	American criminal	aka Dan Cooper
Deco	Anderson Luiz de Sousa	Footballer	
Dick Tiger	Richard Ihetu	Nigerian boxer	
Dida	Nélson de Jesus Silva	Brazilian former footballer	
Doctor Ch@os	Joseph Konopka	American terrorist	
Donna Paola	Paola Grosson	Italian journalist	
Donatello	Donato di Niccolò di Betto Bardi	Italian Renaissance sculptor	
Dosso Dossi	Giovanni di Niccolò de Luteri	Italian painter	
Duda	Sérgio Paulo Barbosa Valente	Portuguese footballer	
Dutch Schultz	Arthur Flegenheimer	American mobster	
El Greco	Dominikos Theotokópulos	Greek painter	
Elizabeth Arden	Florence Graham	Canadian-American businesswoman	
Emmanuel Goldstein	Eric Corley	Hacker	
Erté	Romain de Tirtoff	French artist and designer	
Estée Lauder	Josephine Mentzer	American businesswoman	
Francis of Assisi	Giovanni di Bernardone	Italian Catholic saint	
Francisco "Pancho" Villa	José Arango Arámbula	Mexican revolutionary general and politician	
Frank Costello	Francesco Castiglia	Italian-American mobster	
Frank Talk	Stephen Biko	Activist	
Friedensreich Hundertwasser	Friedrich Stowasser	Visual artist	
Garrincha	Manuel Francisco dos Santos	Brazilian footballer	
Garry Kasparov	Garik Weinstein	Russian chess grandmaster, political activist and writer	
Geki	Giacomo Russo	Italian racing driver	
Germain	Ernest Mandel	Belgian economist and Marxist philosopher	
Gheorghe Gheorghiu-Dej	Gheorge Gheorghiu	Former General Secretary of the Romanian Communist Party	
Gimax	Carlo Franchi	Italian racing driver	
Giorgione	Giorgio da Castelfranco	Italian painter	
Giottino	Maso di Stefano	Italian painter	
Grabica; Grot; Kalina	Stefan Rowecki	Polish general	
Gracchus Babeuf	François-Noël Babeuf	French political agitator and journalist	
Green River Killer	Gary Ridgway	American serial killer	
Grigory Zinoviev	Ovsel Radymyslsky	Russian revolutionary and Soviet politician	
Grzegorz	Tadeusz Pełczyński	Polish army major general	
Gus Hall	Arvo Halberg	Former General Secretary of Communist Party USA	
H. Rap Brown	Hubert Gerold Brown	Activist	
Halston	Roy Halston Frowick	American fashion designer	
Happy Face Killer	Keith Hunter Jesperson	Canadian-American serial killer	
He hate me	Rod Smart	American gridiron football player	
Hellé Nice	Mariette Hélène Delangle	French racing car driver	
Henri Cornet	Henri Jaudry	French cyclist	
Henriett Seth F.	Henrietta Fajcsák	Hungarian artist and autistic savant	
Henry Arundel	Henry Fitzalan-Howard	British racing driver	
Ho Chi Minh	Nguyễn Sinh Cung	Vietnamese communist leader	
Houari Boumédiène	Mohamed Boukharouba	Former president of Algeria	
Hubal	Henryk Dobrzański	Polish army commander	
I-5 Killer	Randall Woodfield	American serial killer and rapist	
Iceman	Richard Kuklinski	American criminal	
Il Garofalo	Benvenuto Tisi	Italian painter	
Il Pordenone	Giovanni Licinio	Italian painter	
Il Sodoma	Giovanni Bazzi	Italian Renaissance painter	
Kim Il Sung	Song-ju Kim	Former leader of North Korea	
Ingahild Grathmer	Margrethe II of Denmark	Illustrator	She illustrated The Lord of the Rings under this pseudonym.
J. Krzemień	Florian Marciniak	First Chief Scout in the Gray Ranks	
J. Posadas	Homero Cristali	Italian-Argentine Trotskyist revolutionary	
J.J. Lehto	Jyrki Järvilehto	Finnish racing driver	
János Kádár	János Csermanek	Former leader of Hungary	
Jean Jérome	Michel Feintuch	French Communist Activist	
Jieshi Jiang	Chiang Kai-shek	Chinese politician and military leader	
Jil Sander	Heidemarie Jiline Sander	German fashion designer	
Jim McKay	James McManus	American television sports journalist	
Jimmy Choo	Choo Yeang Keat	Malaysian-born fashion designer	
Joe Louis	Joseph Louis Barrow	American boxer	
Joel Ash	David Padwa	Author	
John of God	João Teixeira de Faria	Brazilian faith healer	
John Winter	Louis Krages	German racing driver	
Johnny Dumfries	John Crichton-Stuart	British racing driver	
Josef Stalin	Ioseb Dzhugashvili	Former leader of the Soviet Union	
Joseph Estrada	Joseph Ejército	Former president of the Philippines	
Joseph of Cupertino	Giuseppe Desa	Italian Franciscan friar	
Josip Broz Tito	Josip Broz	Former leader of Yugoslavia	
Juice WRLD	Jarad Anthony Higgins	American rapper	
Kaká	Ricardo dos Santos Leite	Brazilian footballer	
Karl Lagerfeld	Karl Lagerfeldt	German fashion designer	
Kaws	Brian Donnelly	American artist and designer	
Khaosai Galaxy	Sura Saenkham	Thai boxer and kickboxer	
Kid McCoy	Norman Selby	American boxer	
Korczak	Tadeusz Bór-Komorowski	Polish military leader	
Kouji Takanohara	Kouji Hanada	Sumo Wrestler	
Kuba	Jakub Błaszczykowski	Polish footballer	
Lawina	Tadeusz Komorowski	Polish military leader	
La Pasionaria	Dolores Ibárruri	Former leader of the Communist Party of Spain	
Le Corbusier	Charles-Édouard Jeanneret	Swiss-French architect	
Leclerc	Philippe Leclerc de Hauteclocque	French general	
Legija	Milorad Ulemek	Serbian military commander and criminal	
Leon Trotsky	Lev Bronstein	Russian Marxist revolutionary	
Lev Kamenev	Lev Rosenfeld	Bolshevik revolutionary and Soviet politician	
Lo Spagna	Giovanni di Petra	Italian painter	
Lucien Petit-Breton	Lucien Mazan	French cyclist	
Lucky Luciano	Salvatore Lucania	Italian-American mobster	
Machine Gun Kelly	George Barnes	American gangster	
Madeon	Hugo Pierre Leclercq	French musician	
Madame Fraya	Valentine Dencausse	French chiromancer	
Madame de Thèbes	Anne-Victorine Savigny / Matylda Průšová	French (Savigny) / Czech (Průšová) fortunetellers	
Mahatma Gandhi	Mohandas Gandhi	Indian independence activist	
Malaclypse the Younger	Gregory Hill	American writer and co-founder of Discordianism	
Man Ray	Emmanuel Radnitzky	American visual artist and photographer	
Manolo Blahnik	Manuel Blahnik Rodriguez	Spanish fashion designer	
Marc Chagall	Moishe Shagall	Belarusian-French artist	
Marc Ecko	Marc Milecofsky	American fashion designer	
Mark Rothko	Marcus Rothkowitz	Abstract painter	
Mark Twain	Samuel Clemens	American Novelist/Humorist	
Martin Thembisile Hani	Chris Hani	Anti-apartheid activist	
Masaccio	Tommaso Cassai	Italian Renaissance painter	
Masaru Wakanohara	Masaru Hanada	Japanese sumo wrestler	
Mata Amritanandamayi	Sudhamani	Indian Hindu spiritual leader	
Mata Hari	Margaretha MacLeod	Dutch courtesan and spy	
Max Factor Jr.	Maksymilian Faktorowicz	American businessperson	
Meyer Lansky	Meyer Suchowljansky	Russian-American gangster	
Michael Fenne	David Kim Stanley	Founder of Pixelon	
Míchel	José Miguel González Martín del Campo	Spaniard footballer	
Michel Pablo	Michel Raptis	Egyptian-Greek activist	
Miss Cleo	Youree Harris	American television psychic	
Miu Miu	Miuccia Prada	Italian fashion designer	
Mo Martin	Melissa Martin	American golfer	
Monter	Antoni Chruściel	Polish military officer	
Moses David	David Berg	American cultist	
Mother Angelica	Rita Rizzo	American nun	
Mother Jones	Mary Jones	Irish-American activist	
Mother Teresa	Agnes Bojaxhiu	Albanian nun	
Mr. Baldy	Brian Keith Jones	Australian criminal	
Mr. Death	Dennis Allen	Australian criminal	
Mr. Rent-a-Kill	Christopher Flannery	Australian assassin	
Mr. Stinky	Raymund Edmunds	Australian murderer	
Murph the Surf	Jack Murphy	American murderer	
Murray the Hump	Murray Humphreys	American criminal	
Mutilator	William McDonald	Serial Killer	
Nahuel Moreno	Hugo Bressano	Argentinian politician	
Nenê	Maybyner Rodney Hilário	Brazilian basketballer	
Niedźwiadek	Leopold Okulicki	Polish general	
Night Stalker	Richard Ramirez	American serial killer	
Nil	August Emil Fieldorf	Polish brigadier general	
Notch	Markus Persson	Swedish former game programmer	
Omar Khayyam Ravenhurst	Kerry Wendell Thornley	American author	
Orsza	Stanisław Broniewski	Polish economist and soldier	
Paco Rabanne	Francisco Rabanedo Cuervo	Basque fashion designer	
Padre Pio	Francesco Forgione	Italian priest and mystic	
Papa Doc	François Duvalier	President of Haiti	
Parmigianino	Girolamo Mazzola	Italian printmaker and painter	
Pedri	Pedro González López	Spanish footballer	
Pelé	Edson Arantes do Nascimento	Brazilian footballer	
Phoenix Jones	Benjamin Fodor	American vigilante and martial artist	
Pierre Delecto	Mitt Romney	Former United States Senator	He used the pseudonym on twitter.
Pierre Levegh	Pierre Bouillin	French auto racer	
Pink	Alecia Moore	American pop musician	
Pisanello	Antonio Pisano	Italian sculptor and painter	
Pol Pot	Saloth Sar	Cambodian politician and murderer	
Ponury	Jan Piwnik	Polish soldier	
Postcard Bandit	Brenden Abbott	Australian robber	
Prachanda	Pushpa Kamal Dahal	Former prime minister of Nepal	
Radosław	Jan Mazurkiewicz	Polish soldier	
Rakoń	Stefan Rowecki	Polish general and journalist	
Ram Dass	Richard Alpert	American religious leader	
Raphael	Raffaello da Urbino	Italian painter and architect	
Raymond Kopa	Raymond Kopaszewski	French footballer	
Red Baron	Manfred von Richthofen	German soldier	
Ricco	Erich Wassmer	Swiss painter	
Rivaldo	Vitor Borba Ferreira	Brazilian footballer	
Rocket Ismail	Raghib Ismail	American football player	
Rocky Marciano	Rocco Marchegiano	American boxer	
Rodri	Rodrigo Hernández Cascante	Spanish footballer	
ROJO	David Quiles Guilló	Artist	
Ronaldinho	Ronaldo de Assis Moreira	Brazilian footballer	
Ronaldo	Ronaldo Nazário de Lima	Brazilian footballer	
Ronwaldo Reyes	Fernando Poe Jr.	Filipino actor, director, and politician	
Saïd Moustapha Mahdjoub	Gilbert Bourgeaud	French mercenary	
SAMO	Jean-Michel Basquiat	American artist	
Sara Jane Olson	Kathleen Soliah	American robber	
Sathya Sai Baba	Sathya Narayana Raju	Indian guru	
Satoshi Nakamato	(unknown)	Inventor of Bitcoin	
Sister Dora	Dorothy Pattison	English nun	
SMG4	Luke Lerdwichagul	Australian YouTuber and co-founder of the animation company Glitch Productions	
Son of Sam	David Berkowitz	American serial killer	
Spurck	Marco Vanoppen	Belgian musician/deconstructivist	
Spy	Leslie Ward	British artist	
Stanley Ketchel	Stanislaus Kiecal	American boxer	
Student	William Sealy Gosset	British statistician	
Sugar Ray Robinson	Walker Smith Jr.	American boxer	
Sundance Kid	Harry Longabaugh	American robber	
Suso	Jesús Fernandez Sáez	Spaniard footballer	
Swami Vivekananda	Narandranath Dutta	Indian monk and philosopher	
Swoon	Caledonia Curry	American graffiti artist	
Taras Chuprynka	Roman Shukhevych	Leader of Ukrainian Insurgent Army	
Ted Grant	Isaac Blank	South African-British activist	
The Edge	David Evans	Lead guitarist, U2	
Thérèse of Lisieux	Marie-Françoise-Thérèse Martin	French nun and saint	
Tiger Woods	Eldrick Woods	American golfer	
Tintoretto	Jacopo Robusti	Italian painter	
Titian	Tiziano Vecelli	Italian painter	
Tom of Finland	Touko Laaksonen	Finnish visual artist	
Tony Cliff	Yigael Glückstein	Israeli-English activist	
Tony Zale	Anthony Zaleski	American boxer	
Tristán Marof	Gustavo Navarro	Bolivian activist	
Ulay	Frank Uwe Leysiepen	German artist	
Unabomber	Ted Kaczynski	American serial killer	
Utisz	István Orosz	Hungarian visual artist	
VaGla	Piotr Waglowski	Polish activist	
Vecchietta	Francesco di Giorgio e di Lorenzo	Italian painter	
Viktor Suvorov	Vladimir Rezun	Russian-British Soviet defector and author	
Vladimir Lenin	Vladimir Ulyanov	1st head of the Soviet Union	
VLEZ	Claudio Ribeiro Velez	Artist - Architect	
Voltaire	François-Marie Arouet	French Enlightenment writer, historian, and philosopher	
Vyacheslav Molotov	Vyacheslav Skryabin	Russian politician	
Waxey Gordon	Irving Wexler	American gangster	
WhoIsParadise	Marcus Dawes	British-American musician and activist	
Wilk	Aleksander Krzyżanowski	Polish soldier	
William Andersen	Christian Wilhelm Allers	French cricketeer	
William Rabbit	Katay Don Sasorith	8th prime minister of Laos	
Willy Brandt	Herbert Frahm	Chancellor of Germany	
Xanana Gusmão	José Alexandre Gusmão	3rd prime minister of Timor-Leste	
Yorkshire Ripper	Peter Sutcliffe	English serial killer	
XXXTentacion	Jahseh Dwayne Ricardo Onfroy	American rapper	
Ye	Kanye Omari West	American rapper	He often used the mononym during the late 2010s, even naming an album as such, although he legally changed his name to "Ye" in October 2021.
Zico	Arthur Antunes Coimbra	Brazilian footballer and manager	
Znicz	Tadeusz Komorowski	Polish soldier	
Zośka	Tadeusz Zawadzki	Polish soldier	

== Fictional pseudonyms ==
=== Superhero genre ===
- Iron Man (Anthony Edward "Tony" Stark) – Marvel Comics
- Captain America (Steven Grant "Steve" Rogers) – Marvel Comics
- The Hulk (Dr. Robert Bruce Banner) – Marvel Comics
- Spider-Man (Peter Benjamin Parker) – Marvel Comics
  - Spider-Man (Miles Gonzalo Morales) – Marvel Comics
- Black Cat (Felicia Hardy) – Marvel Comics
- Doctor Octopus (Dr. Otto Gunther Octavius) - Marvel Comics
- Wolverine (Logan, James Howlett) – Marvel Comics
- Hawkeye (Clinton Francis "Clint" Barton) – Marvel Comics
  - Hawkeye (Katherine Elizabeth "Kate" Bishop) – Marvel Comics
- Black Widow (Claire Voyant) – Marvel Comics
  - Black Widow (Natalia Alianovna "Natasha Romanoff" Romanova) – Marvel Comics
  - Black Widow (Yelena Belova) – Marvel Comics
- Ironheart (Riri Williams) – Marvel Comics
- Black Panther (T'Challa) – Marvel Comics
  - Black Panther (T'Chaka) – Marvel Comics
  - Black Panther (Princess Shuri) – Marvel Comics
- Ant-Man (Henry Jonathan Pym) – Marvel Comics
  - Ant-Man (Scott Edward Harris Lang) – Marvel Comics
  - Ant-Man (Eric O'Grady) – Marvel Comics
- Daredevil (Matthew Michael "Matt" Murdock) – Marvel Comics
- Amazing-Man (William Blake "Will" Everett) – DC Comics
  - Amazing-Man (William Blake "Will" Everett III) – DC Comics
  - Amazing-Man (Markus Clay) – DC Comics
- Amethyst, Princess of Gemworld (Amy Winston) – DC Comics
- Animal Man (Bernhard "Buddy" Baker) – DC Comics
- Aquagirl (Lorena Marquez) – DC Comics
- Argus (Nick Kelly) – DC Comics
- Atom (Albert "Al" Pratt) – DC Comics
- Aqualad (Garth) – DC Comics
  - Aqualad (Kaldur'ahm / Jackson Hyde) – DC Comics
- Aquaman (Arthur Joseph Curry) – DC Comics
- Superman (Kal-El / Clark Joseph Kent) – DC Comics
- Batgirl (Barbara Gordon) – DC Comics
  - Batgirl (Cassandra Cain) – DC Comics
- Batman (Bruce Wayne) – DC Comics
- Catwoman (Selina Kyle) – DC Comics
  - Catwoman (Patience Phillips) – 2004 film
- Huntress (Helena Wayne) – DC Comics
  - Huntress (Helena Bertinelli) – DC Comics
- The Penguin (Oswald Chesterfield Cobblepot) – DC Comics
- The Riddler (Dr. Edward Nigma) – DC Comics
- Rorschach (Walter Joseph Kovacs) – Watchmen (Alan Moore graphic novel)
- The Flash (Jason Peter "Jay" Garrick) – DC Comics
  - The Flash (Bartholomew Henry "Barry" Allen) – DC Comics
  - The Flash (Wallace Rudolph "Wally" West) – DC Comics
  - The Flash (Bartholomew Henry "Bart" Allen II) – DC Comics
- Wonder Woman (Princess Diana of Themyscira / Diana Prince) – DC Comics

=== Other fictional characters ===
- Lord Voldemort (Thomas Marvolo "Tom" Riddle) – Harry Potter series
- Aramis (Henri d'Aramitz, le Chevalier d'Herblay) – The Three Musketeers
- Scarlet Pimpernel (Sir Percy Blakeney) - The Scarlet Pimpernel
- Athos (Armand de Sillègue d'Athos d'Autevielle, Le Comte de La Fère) – The Three Musketeers
- Demosthenes (Valentine Wiggin) – Ender's Game series
- Chuck Finley (Sam Axe) - Burn Notice
- Monika (Monitor Kernel Access / Monika.chr / Monika) – Doki Doki Literature Club!
- d'Artagnan (Charles de Batz-Castelmore) – The Three Musketeers
- Dylan Sharp (Deryn Sharp) – Leviathan by Scott Westerfeld
- Jeff (Othello Jeffries from the comic strip Mutt and Jeff)
- Locke (Peter Wiggin) – Ender's Game series
- M (Sir Miles Messervy) – James Bond novels
- Q (Major Boothroyd) – James Bond novels
- Regina Phalange (Phoebe Buffay) – Friends
- Porthos (Isaac de Porthau, Baron du Vallon de Bracieux de Pierrefonds) – The Three Musketeers
- Rusty Shackleford (Dale Gribble) - King of the Hill
- Duke Silver (Ron Swanson) - Parks and Recreation
- Speaker for the Dead (Ender Wiggin) – Ender's Game series
- Ken Adams (Joey Tribbiani) – Friends
- Art Vandelay (George Costanza) – Seinfeld
- La Volpe – Assassin's Creed II and Assassin's Creed: Brotherhood
- Zorro (Don Diego de la Vega)
- Alucard (Adrian Fahrenheit Ţepeş)
- Mr. Underhill (Frodo Baggins) – The Lord of the Rings series
- The Shadow (Lamont Cranston)
- Clint Eastwood (Marty McFly) – Back to the Future Part III
- Heisenberg (Walter White) – Breaking Bad
- Saul Goodman (James "Jimmy" McGill) – Breaking Bad
- L (L Lawliet) – Death Note
- John Smith (Kyon) - Haruhi Suzumiya
- The Doctor – Doctor Who
- Keyser Söze (Roger "Verbal" Kint) - The Usual Suspects
- Rollo Tomasi - Pseudonym given to his father's unknown murderer by Lieutenant Edmund Exley - L.A. Confidential
- Comic Book Guy (Jeff Albertson) - The Simpsons
- Fat Tony (Don Marion Anthony D'Amico) - The Simpsons
- Krusty the Clown (Herschel Shmoikel Pinchas Yerucham Krustofsky) - The Simpsons

== See also ==
- Literary initials
- List of pen names
- List of people who adopted matrilineal surnames
- List of pseudonyms used in the American Constitutional debates
- List of works published under a pseudonym
- Mononymous persons
- Nicknames of jazz musicians
- Pseudonyms used by U.S. President Donald Trump
