= Veeder =

Veeder is a surname. Notable people with the surname include:

- Charles H. Veeder (1796–1871), American lawyer and businessman
- Emily Elizabeth Veeder (1841–1898), American author
- Korey Veeder (born 1991), American soccer player
- Paul Veeder, American football player
- Van Vechten Veeder (1867–1942), American judge
- William D. Veeder (1835–1910), American politician
- William Veeder (born 1940), American literary critic

== See also ==
- Mount Veeder AVA, American Viticultural Area
- 3510 Veeder, main-belt asteroid
