= Charles Macfarlane =

Scottish writer

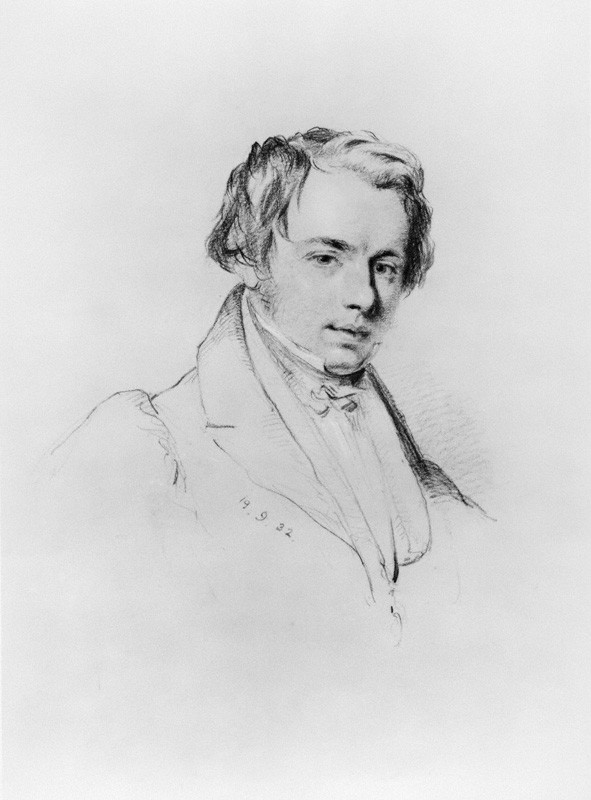
Portrait (1832) of Charles Macfarlane in black & red chalk by William Brockedon (1787–1854)

Charles Macfarlane (1799–1858) was a Scottish writer, known as much for his historical and travel works as he was for his novels.

== Life ==
He was the son of Robert Macfarlane. From January 1816 to May 1827 he lived in Italy. In 1827, he went to Turkey and lived for sixteen months in Constantinople and the Turkish provinces.

Macfarlane settled in London, England in 1829, supporting himself by writing. He was for many years on the staff of the publisher, Charles Knight.

Accompanied by his eldest son, then 16, Macfarlane returned to Turkey in 1847. On his way home, in the summer of 1848, they visited Messina and made a tour through the kingdom of Naples, the Abruzzi, the marches of Ancona, and Rome. His wife Charlotte died in 1854 at their home in Canterbury, Kent. In July 1857 he was nominated a poor brother of the London Charterhouse, where he died on 9 December 1858.

== Works ==
Macfarlane's most substantial work was the Civil and Military History of England, part of Knight's Pictorial History of England, edited by George Lillie Craik, 8 vols. 1838-44. An abridgment, with a continuation bringing it up to date, was published under the title of The Cabinet History of England, 26 vols. London, 1845-7. Another edition, with the title changed to The Comprehensive History of England, appeared under the editorship of Thomas Napier Thomson, 4 vols. London, 1856–61, and again in 1876–8; and a third, with a continuation to 1884, by Thomas Archer, was issued as The Popular History of England, 3 vols. London, 1886. For Knight also, Macfarlane compiled anonymously two volumes called The Book of Table Talk, 1836 (another edition 1847), for which James Robinson Planché wrote a brief history of stage costume.

Macfarlane wrote historical novels and biographies of Thomas Gresham (1847), the Duke of Marlborough (1852), the Duke of Wellington (1853, 1877, 1886), and Napoleon I (1852, 1879, 1880, 1886). His works included:

- Constantinople in 1828, London, 1829 (two editions; translated into French, 2 vols. Paris, 1829).
- The Armenians, a Tale of Constantinople, 3 vols. London, 1830.
- Barba Yorghi (or Uncle George), the Greek Pilot, in vol. i. of The Sisters' Budget, London, 1831.
- The Romance of History; Italy, 3 vols. London, 1832 (and 1872).
- The Seven Apocalyptic Churches, etchings by T. Knox, London, 1832.
- The Lives and Exploits of Banditti and Robbers in all parts of the World, 2 vols. London, 1833 (1837, in Murray's Family Library).
- The French Revolution, 4 vols. London, 1844–5, in Knight's Library for the Times.
- Our Indian Empire, London, 1844, in the same series.
- The Camp of Refuge (anon.), 2 vols. London, 1844 (also 1880–1887); a tale of the conquest of the Isle of Ely. Features Hereward the Wake as a character.
- A Legend of Reading Abbey (anon.), London, 1845, in Knight's Weekly, No. 62. Historical novel about the conflict between King Stephen and Empress Matilda.
- The Dutch in the Medway (anon.), London, 1845, in the same series, No. 43. These three tales were published together, under the title of Old England Novelettes, 4 vols. 1846–7.
- The Romance of Travel; the East, 2 vols. London, 1846–7, in Knight's Weekly Volume for All Readers (Knight's Weekly), Nos. 81, 111.
- Popular Customs, Sports, and Recollections of the South of Italy, London, 1846, in Knight's Monthly Volume, originally contributed to the Penny Magazine between 1834 and 1845.
- A Glance at Revolutionized Italy, 2 vols. London, 1849.
- Sicily, her Constitutions, and Viscount Palmerston's Sicilian Blue-Book, London, 1849, an appendix to the above.
- Turkey and its Destiny, 2 vols. London, 1850.
- The Neapolitan Government and Mr. Gladstone, London, 1851.
- A History of British India, London, 1852 (1857, 1858, and 1881).
- Japan, an account Geographical and Historical … With Illustrations from Designs by A. Allom, London, 1852.
- The Catacombs of Rome, with Illustrations, London, 1852 (1854 and 1855).
- The Great Battles of the British Army, London, 1853 (2nd edit. 1854).
- Kismet, or the Doom of Turkey, London, 1853.
- The Camp of 1853, with Hints on Military Matters for Civilians, London, 1853.
- Patriots of China, London, 1853.
- The Chinese Revolution, with details of the Habits, Manners, and Customs of China and the Chinese, London, 1853.
- Reminiscences of a literary life, ed. J. F. Tattersall, London, 1917.

He also translated Adolphe Desbarrolles' Two French Artists in Spain, 1851.

== Family ==
Macfarlane married Charlotte Emily Ormsden in about 1830. They had six children: Charles, Arabella, Blanche, Malcolm (died young), Victor and Marion Macfarlane. Daughters Arabella and Marion became nuns, while sons Charles and Victor had military careers.

== Notes ==
Attribution

This article incorporates text from a publication now in the public domain: Lee, Sidney, ed. (1893). "Macfarlane, Charles". Dictionary of National Biography. Vol. 35. London: Smith, Elder & Co.
