= List of literary initials =

A large number of authors choose to use some form of initials in their name when it appears in their literary work. This includes some of the most famous authors of the 20th century – D. H. Lawrence, J. D. Salinger, T. S. Eliot, J. R. R. Tolkien, etc. – and also a host of lesser-known writers.

Well-known initials and their corresponding full names are listed below.

== A ==
- A. A. Milne – Alan Alexander Milne
- A. B. "Banjo" Paterson – Andrew Barton Paterson
- A. B. Guthrie – Alfred Bertram Guthrie
- A. C. Benson – Arthur Christopher Benson
- A. C. Q. W. – Anna Cabot Quincy Waterston
- A. C. Waldron – Adelaide Cilley Waldron
- A. C. de la Mare – Albinia Catherine de la Mare
- A. D. Hope – Alec Derwent Hope
- A. D. Miller – Andrew D Miller
- A.E. – pseudonym of George William Russell
- A. E. Coppard – Alfred Edgar Coppard
- A. E. Holt White – Agnes Edith Holt White
- A. E. Housman – Alfred Edward Housman
- A. E. Levett – Ada Elizabeth Levett
- A. E. Stallings – Alicia Elsbeth Stallings
- A. E. W. Mason – Alfred Edward Woodley Mason
- A. Flowerdew – Alice Flowerdew
- A. J. Alan – pseudonym of Leslie Harrison Lambert
- A. J. Ayer – Alfred Jules Ayer
- A. J. Cronin – Archibald Joseph Cronin
- A. J. Liebling – Abbott Joseph Liebling
- A. J. P. Taylor – Alan John Percivale Taylor
- A. K. M. Adam – Andrew Keith Malcolm Adam
- A. L. Barker – Audrey Lilian Barker
- A. L. Kennedy – Alison Louise Kennedy
- A. L. Rowse – Alfred Leslie Rowse
- A. M. Homes – Amy M. Homes
- A. M. Jenkins – Amanda McRaney Jenkins
- A. M. W. Stirling – Anna Marie Wilhelmina Stirling
- A. N. Wilson – Andrew Norman Wilson
- A. O. Scott – Anthony Oliver Scott
- A. R. L. – Anne Richelieu Lamb
- A. R. Morlan – Arlette Renee Morlan
- A. S. Byatt – Antonia Susan Byatt
- A. S. J. Tessimond – Arthur Seymour John Tessimond
- A. S. King – Amy Sarig King
- A. S. Neill – Alexander Sutherland Neill
- A. V. Christie – Ann Victoria Christie
- A. W. Kinglake – Alexander William Kinglake
- Abbie C. B. Robinson – Abbie Colburn Ballou Robinson
- Ada L. F. Snell – Ada Laura Fonda Snell
- Addie C. S. Engle – Addie Clarissa Strong Engle
- Alice B. S. Turner – Alice Bellvadore Sams Turner
- Alice D. G. Miller – Alice Dorothea Georgianna Miller
- Annie M. G. Schmidt – Annie Maria Geertruida Schmidt
- Arthur C. Clarke – Arthur Charles Clarke

== B ==
- B. Beaumont – Betty Beaumont
- B. A. Stearns – Betsey Ann Stearns
- B. F. Skinner – Burrhus Frederic Skinner
- B. M. Bower – Bertha Muzzy Sinclair
- B. M. Wilson – Bertha May Wilson
- B. S. Johnson – Bryan Stanley Johnson

== C ==
- CAConrad
- C. A. Lejeune – Caroline Alice Lejeune
- C. H. B. Kitchin – Clifford Henry Benn Kitchin
- C. H. Stranahan – Clara Harrison Stranahan
- C. J. Cherryh – Carolyn Janice Cherry
- C. J. Sansom – Christopher John Sansom
- C. L. R. James – Cyril Lionel Robert James
- C. L. Moore – Catherine Lucille Moore
- C. M. Ridding – Caroline Mary Ridding
- C. M. Sawyer – Caroline Mehitable Sawyer
- C. P. Cavafy – Constantine Petrou Cavafy
- C. P. Snow – Charles Percy Snow
- C. S. Calverley – Charles Stuart Calverley
- C. S. Forester – Cecil Scott Forester
- C. S. Lewis – Clive Staples Lewis
- C.C. Hunter – pseudonym of Christie Craig
- C. V. Wedgwood – Cicely Veronica Wedgwood
- Catharine H. T. Avery – Catharine Hitchcock Tilden Avery
- Celeste M. A. Winslow – Celeste Mary Augusta Winslow
- Corelli C. W. Simpson – Corelli Caswell Williams Simpson
- Cornelia J. M. Jordan – Cornelia Jane Matthews Jordan

== D ==
- DBC Pierre – Dirty But Clean Pierre
- D. A. McGuire – Diane Andrews McGuire
- D. A. Powell – Douglas A. Powell
- D. C. Fontana – Dorothy Catherine Fontana
- D. C. Moore – David Moore
- D. E. Stevenson – Dorothy Emily Stevenson
- D. G. K. Goldberg – Diane Gail Kelly Goldberg
- D. H. Lawrence – David Herbert Lawrence
- D. J. Enright – Dennis Joseph Enright
- D. J. Taylor – David John Taylor
- D. K. Broster – Dorothy Kathleen Broster
- D. M. Thomas – Donald Michael Thomas

== E ==
- E. Annie Proulx – Edna Annie Proulx
- E. B. C. – Essie Blythe Cheesborough
- E. B. C. Jones – Emily Beatrix Coursolles Jones
- E. B. White – Elwyn Brooks White
- E. C. R. Lorac – Edith Caroline Rivett Lorac (pseudonym)
- E. D. Baker – Elizabeth Dawson Baker
- E. D. E. N. Southworth – Emma Dorothy Eliza Nevitte Southworth
- E. E. Brown – Emma Elizabeth Brown
- E. E. Cowper – Edith Elise Cowper
- E. E. Cummings – Edward Estlin Cummings
- E. E. Smith – Edward Elmer Smith
- E. F. Benson – Edward Frederic Benson
- E. G. A. – Emily Gillmore Alden
- E. H. Carr – Edward Hallett Carr
- E. H. Young – Emily Hilda Young
- E. J. Eames – Elizabeth Jessup Eames
- E.J. Miller Laino – Eleanor Jane Miller Laino
- E. J. Richmond – Euphemia Johnson Richmond
- E. J. Scovell – Edith Joy Scovell
- E. L. Benedict – Emma Lee Benedict
- E. L. Dorsey – Ella Loraine Dorsey
- E. L. Doctorow – Edgar Lawrence Doctorow
- E. L. James – pseudonym of Erika Leonard
- E. L. Konigsburg – Elaine Lobl Konigsburg
- E. L. S. – Emily Lee Sherwood Ragan
- E. Lockhart – pseudonym of Emily Jenkins
- E. M. Broner – Esther Masserman Broner
- E. M. Delafield – Edmée Elizabeth Monica Dashwood (pseudonym)
- E. M. Forster – Edward Morgan Forster
- E. M. Granger Bennett – Ethel Mary Granger Bennett
- E. M. Hull – Edith Maud Hull
- E. Nesbit – Edith Nesbit
- E. R. Braithwaite – Edward Ricardo Braithwaite
- E. S. L. Thompson – Elizabeth Shepherd Lamb Thompson
- E. S. Drower – Ethel Stefana Drower
- E. S. Elliott – Elizabeth Steele Elliott
- E. T. A. Hoffmann – Ernst Theodor Amadeus Hoffmann
- E. V. Baxter – Evelyn Vida Baxter
- E. V. Sheridan – Emma Viola Sheridan
- E. Vale Blake – Euphemia Vale Blake
- E. W. Swanton – Ernest William Swanton
- Edward P. Jones – Edward Paul Jones
- Ella M. S. Marble – Ella Marie Smith Marble
- Elizabeth A. R. Brown – Elizabeth Atkinson Rash Brown
- Emma F. R. Campbell – Emma Frances Riggs Campbell
- Estelle M. H. Merrill – Estelle Minerva Hatch Merrill
- Ernest J. Gaines – Ernest James Gaines

== F ==
- F. Burge Griswold – Frances Burge Griswold
- F. C. Burnand – Francis Cowley Burnand
- F. E. Fryatt – Frances Elizabeth Fryatt
- F. E. Mills Young – Florence Ethel Mills Young
- F. O. Matthiessen – Francis Otto Matthiessen
- F. R. Leavis – Frank Raymond Leavis
- F. Scott Fitzgerald – Francis Scott Fitzgerald

== G ==
- G. B. Edwards – Gerald Basil Edwards
- G. B. Shaw – George Bernard Shaw
- G. D. H. Cole – George Douglas Howard Cole
- G. E. Trevelyan – Gertrude Eileen Trevelyan
- G. K. Chesterton – Gilbert Keith Chesterton
- G. M. Trevelyan – George Macaulay Trevelyan
- George R. R. Martin – George Raymond Richard Martin

== H ==
- H. A. Rey – Hans Augusto Rey
- H. A. R. Gibb – Hamilton Alexander Rosskeen Gibb
- H. B. Goodwin – Hannah Bradbury Goodwin
- H. C. Cradock – Mrs. Henry Cowper Cradock
- H.D. – Hilda Doolittle
- H. D. Everett – Henrietta Dorothy Everett
- H. E. Bates – Herbert Ernest Bates
- H. E. G. Arey – Harriett Ellen Grannis Arey
- H. E. P. – Harriet Eudora Pritchard
- H. G. Wells – Herbert George Wells
- H. H. Munro – Hector Hugh Munro (pen name: Saki)
- H. J. Massingham – Harold John Massingham
- H. L. Gold – Horace Leonard Gold
- H. L. Mencken – Henry Louis Mencken
- H. M. G. – Hannah Maria George
- H. M. Hoover – Helen Mary Hoover
- H. M. M. – Helen (M.) Merrill Egerton
- H. M. Tomlinson – Henry Major Tomlinson
- H. N. K. Goff – Harriet Newell Kneeland Goff
- H. P. Lovecraft – Howard Phillips Lovecraft
- H. R. F. Keating – Henry Reymond Fitzwalter Keating
- H. S. – Henrietta Skelton
- Hunter S. Thompson – Hunter Stockton Thompson
- H. T. C. – Helen Taggart Clark

== I ==
- I. A. Richards – Ivor Armstrong Richards
- I. A. R. Wylie – Ida Alexa Ross Wylie
- Iain M. Banks – Iain Menzies Banks
- I. F. Stone – Isidor Feinstein Stone
- I. M. E. Blandin – Isabella Margaret Elizabeth Blandin
- I. McC. Wilson – Ibbie McColm Wilson

== J ==
- J. Meade Falkner – John Meade Falkner
- J. A. Jance – Judith Ann Jance
- J. A. Lawrence – Judith Ann Lawrence
- J. B. Priestley – John Boynton Priestley
- J. C. Bateham – Josephine Cushman Bateham
- J. D. Beresford – John Davys Beresford
- J. D. Robb – Nora Roberts
- J. D. Salinger – Jerome David Salinger
- J. E. Franklin – Jennie Elizabeth Franklin
- J. E. Macdonnell –James Edmond Macdonnell
- J. E. McConaughy – Julia Eliza McConaughy
- Jerome K. Jerome – Jerome Klapka Jerome
- J. F. O'Donnell – Jessie Fremont O'Donnell
- J. F. Powers – James Farl Powers
- J. G. Ballard – James Graham Ballard
- J. G. Farrell – James Gordon Farrell
- J. H. Prynne – Jeremy Halvard Prynne
- J. H. Plumb – John Harold Plumb
- J. I. M. Stewart – John Innes Mackintosh Stewart
- J. K. Rowling – Joanne Rowling (The K honors her grandmother Kathleen, but is not part of her legal name.)
- J. L. Carr – Joseph Lloyd Carr
- J. M. Barrie – James Matthew Barrie
- J. M. Coetzee – John Maxwell Coetzee
- J. M. Synge – John Millington Synge
- J. M. Winton – Jeneverah Maria Winton
- John D. MacDonald – John Dann MacDonald
- J. P. Dabney – Julia Parker Dabney
- J. P. Donleavy – James Patrick Donleavy
- J. R. Ackerley – Joe Randolph Ackerley
- J. R. R. Tolkien – John Ronald Reuel Tolkien
- J. T. – Jeanette Threlfall
- James A. Michener – James Albert Michener
- James M. Cain – James Mallahan Cain
- James T. Farrell – James Thomas Farrell
- Jane T. H. Cross – Jane Tandy Hardin Cross
- Janice Y. K. Lee – Janice Yoon-kyung Lee
- Jennifer S. H. Brown – Jennifer Stacey Harcourt Brown
- Julia C. R. Dorr – Julia Caroline Ripley Dorr

== K ==
- K. A. Applegate – Katherine Alice Applegate
- K. D. Miller – Kathleen Daisy Miller
- K. D. Wentworth – Kathy Diane Wentworth
- K. J. Bishop – Kirsten Jane Bishop
- K. K. Beck – Kathrine Kristine Beck
- K. S. Brooks – Kathryn Salina Brooks
- K.V. Johansen – Krista Victoria Johansen

== L ==
- L. – Lois Bryan Adams
- L. A. G. Strong – Leonard Alfred George Strong
- L. C. Hayden – Elsie Hayden
- L. E. L. – Letitia Elizabeth Landon
- L. Frank Baum – Lyman Frank Baum
- L. H. Myers – Leopold Hamilton Myers
- L. J. Smith – Lisa Jane Smith
- L. M. Montgomery – Lucy Maud Montgomery
- L. P. Hartley – Leslie Poles Hartley
- L. R. Wright – Laurali Rose Wright
- L. Ron Hubbard – Lafayette Ronald Hubbard
- L. Sprague de Camp – Lyon Sprague de Camp
- L.M. Elliott – Laura Malone Elliott
- Laura C. S. Dayton – Laura Canfield Spencer Dayton
- Luella J. B. Case – Luella Juliette Bartlett Case

== M ==
- M. A. C. Farrant – Marion Alice Coburn Farrant
- M. A. Griffiths – Margaret Ann Griffiths
- M. B. Goffstein – Marilyn Brooke Goffstein
- M. B. M. Toland – Mary Bertha McKenzie Toland
- M. C. Richards – Mary Caroline Richards
- M. E. Atkinson – Mary Evelyn Atkinson
- M. E. Banta – Melissa Elizabeth Banta
- M. E. Beauchamp – Mary Elizabeth Beauchamp
- M. E. C. Bates – Martha Elizabeth Cram Bates
- M. E. L. – Mary Elizabeth Lee
- M. E. M. Davis – Mollie Evelyn Moore Davis
- M. E. Moragne – Mary Elizabeth Moragne Davis
- M .E. W. – Marion E. Warner
- M. E. W. Sherwood – Mary Elizabeth Wilson Sherwood
- M. E. Willson – Mary Elizabeth Willson
- M. F. K. Fisher – Mary Frances Kennedy Fisher
- M. G. Harris – Maria Guadalupe Harris
- M. J. Akbar – Mobashar Jawed Akbar
- M. J. Engh – Mary Jane Engh
- M. J. Hyland – Maria Joan Hyland
- M. M. Kaye – Mary Margaret Kaye
- M. M. Norton – Morilla Maria Norton
- M. Night Shyamalan – Manoj Shyamalan
- M. R. James – Montague Rhodes James
- M. T. Dohaney –Myrtis Theresa Dohaney
- M. Wintermute – Martha Wintermute
- Margaret M. H. Finch – Margaret Maddox Hammond Finch
- Mary C. Billings – Mary Charlotte Billings
- Mary C. F. Hall-Wood – Mary Camilla Foster Hall-Wood
- Mary E. C. Bancker – Mary Elizabeth Cradinger Bancker
- Mary L. F. Ormsby – Mary Louise Frost Ormsby
- Mary L. G. Carus-Wilson – Mary Louisa Georgina Carus-Wilson
- Mary R. T. McAboy – Mary Rootes Thornton McAboy
- Mary S. B. Shindler – Mary Stanley Bunce Shindler
- Mary V. R. Thayer – Mary Van Rensselaer Thayer
- Mrs. I. Lowenberg – Mrs. Isidor Lowenberg
- Mrs. B. C. Rude – Mrs. Benton Clark Rude

== N ==
- N. Scott Momaday – Navarre Scott Momaday
- N. F. Simpson – Norman Frederick Simpson
- N. K. Jemisin – Nora Keita Jemisin
- N. M. Kelby – Nicole Mary Kelby
- Naomi E. S. Griffiths – Naomi Elizabeth Saundaus Griffiths
- Neil M. Gunn – Neil Miller Gunn

== O ==
- O. E. Rølvaag – Ole Edvart Rølvaag
- O. Henry – pen-name of William Sydney Porter
- O. Douglas – pen-name of Anna Masterton Buchan
- O. O. McIntyre – Oscar Odd McIntyre

== P ==
- P. B. Shelley – Percy Bysshe Shelley
- P. C. Cast – Phyllis Christine Cast
- P. C. Hodgell – Patricia Christine Hodgell
- P. C. Wren – Percival Christopher Wren
- P. D. Cacek – Patricia Diana Cacek
- P. D. James – Phyllis Dorothy James
- P. D. Eastman – Philip Dey "Phil" Eastman
- P. G. Wodehouse – Pelham Grenville Wodehouse
- P. H. Newby – Percy Howard Newby
- P. J. Cowan – Pricilla Jean Cowan
- P. J. O'Rourke – Patrick Jake O'Rourke
- P. K. Page – Patricia Kathleen Page
- P. L. Travers –Pamela Lyndon Travers
- P. M. Carlson – Patricia McElroy Carlson
- P. N. Elrod – Patricia Nead Elrod
- P. N. Furbank – Philip Nicholas Furbank
- Pearl S. Buck – Pearl Sydenstricker Buck
- Philip K. Dick – Philip Kindred Dick
- Poppy Z. Brite – pseudonym of Melissa Ann Brite

== Q ==
- Q – pseudonym of Arthur Quiller-Couch

== R ==
- R. Crumb – Robert Dennis Crumb
- R. A. Lafferty – Rafael Aloysius Lafferty
- R. A. MacAvoy – Roberta Ann MacAvoy
- R. A. Salvatore – Robert Anthony Salvatore
- R. C. Hutchinson – Ray Coryton Hutchinson
- R. C. Lehmann – Rudolf Chambers Lehmann
- R. C. Robertson-Glasgow – Raymond Charles Robertson-Glasgow
- R. C. Sherriff – Robert Cedric Sherriff
- R. D. Blackmore – Richard Doddridge Blackmore
- R. E. Vernède – Robert Ernest Vernède
- R. G. Collingwood – Robin George Collingwood
- R. H. Mottram – Ralph Hale Mottram
- R. H. Tawney – Richard Henry Tawney
- R. J. Palacio – Raquel Jaramillo Palacio
- R. J. Yeatman – Robert Julian Yeatman
- R. K. Narayan – Rasipuram Krishnaswami Iyer Narayanaswami (original name)
- R. K. Walker – Rosa Kershaw Walker
- Robert A. Heinlein – Robert Anson Heinlein
- Robert B. Parker – Robert Brown Parker
- Robert C. O'Brien – pen-name of Robert Leslie Conly
- R. L. Stevenson – Robert Louis Stevenson
- R. L. Stine – Robert Lawrence Stine
- R. M. Ballantyne – Robert Michael Ballantyne
- R. R. Palmer – Robert Roswell Palmer
- R. S. Thomas – Ronald Stuart Thomas

== S ==
- S. C. Megale – Shea Coline Megale
- S. D. Chrostowska – Sylwia Dominika Chrostowska
- S. D. Perry – Stephani Danelle Perry
- S. E. Hinton – Susan Eloise Hinton
- S. E. Lister – Sophie Elizabeth Lister
- S. J. Rozan – Shira Judith Rozan
- S. L. Twiggs – Sarah Lowe Twiggs
- S. M. I. Henry – Sarepta Myrenda Irish Henry
- S. M. Perkins – Sarah Maria Perkins
- S. O. Johnson – Sophia Orne Johnson
- S. P. Somtow – Somtow Papinian Sucharitkul
- S. T. Joshi – Sunand Tryambak Joshi
- S. Y. Agnon – Shmuel Yosef Agnon
- Sarah J. C. Whittlesey – Sarah Johnson Cogswell Whittlesey
- Susanna M. D. Fry – Susanna Margaret Davidson Fry

== T ==
- T. Coraghessan Boyle – Thomas Coraghessan Boyle
- T. Gertler – Trudy Gertler
- T. B. Macaulay – Thomas Babington Macaulay
- T. E. Hulme – Thomas Ernest Hulme
- T. E. Lawrence – Thomas Edward Lawrence
- T. H. Green – Thomas Hill Green
- T. H. White – Terence Hanbury White
- T. J. Binyon – Timothy John Binyon
- T. J. MacGregor – Patricia Janeshutz MacGregor
- T. S. Eliot – Thomas Stearns Eliot
- Thomas M. Disch – Thomas Michael Disch

== U ==
- U. A. Fanthorpe – Ursula Askham Fanthorpe
- Ursula K. Le Guin or (once) U. K. Le Guin – Ursula Kroeber Le Guin

== V ==
- V. C. Andrews – Cleo Virginia Andrews
- V. S. Naipaul – Vidiadhar Surajprasad Naipaul
- V. S. Pritchett – Victor Sawdon Pritchett

== W ==
- W. B. Yeats – William Butler Yeats
- W. C. Sellar – Walter Carruthers Sellar
- W. D. Ehrhart – William Daniel Ehrhart
- W. E. B. Du Bois – William Edward Burghardt Du Bois
- W. E. Henley – William Ernest Henley
- W. G. Sebald – Winfried Georg Sebald
- W. H. Auden – Wystan Hugh Auden
- W. H. Davies – William Henry Davies
- W. S. Gilbert – William Schwenck Gilbert
- W. S. Graham – William Sydney Graham
- W. S. Merwin – William Stanley Merwin
- W. Somerset Maugham – William Somerset Maugham
- William T. Vollmann – William Tanner Vollmann
- Winston S. Churchill – Winston Spencer Churchill

== Y ==
- Y. L. E. – Mary Whitwell Hale (the concluding letters of her name)

== Z ==
- ZZ Packer – Zuwena Packer (second Z is decorative)
