= Marion Macfarlane =

First Anglican woman ordained in Australia in 1884

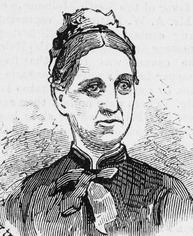
- Macfarlane in 1883

Personal life
- Born: 19 July 1840 Colney Hatch, Middlesex, England
- Died: 29 April 1898 (aged 57) Oakleigh, Victoria, Australia
- Parent(s): Charles Macfarlane and Charlotte Emily Ormsden

Religious life
- Religion: Anglicanism; Catholicism
- Monastic name: Sister Mary Euphrasia

Marion Macfarlane (19 July 1840 – 29 April 1898) was the first woman to be ordained in the Anglican Church in Australia. She was ordained to the Female Diaconate in 1884 in the Diocese of Melbourne, then in 1886 converted to Catholicism, took the name Sister Mary Euphrasia, and joined the Sisters of the Good Shepherd.

== Early life ==
Marion Macfarlane was born 19 July 1840 in Colney Hatch, Middlesex, England, daughter of the Scottish writer Charles Macfarlane (1799–1858). By 1861, she was a governess to an Anglican vicar and his family in Essex. In 1867 she joined the Society of St Margaret at East Grinstead, Sussex, one of the earliest religious orders for women in the post-Reformation Church of England. She was clothed as a novice in 1868 and professed in 1870 and worked primarily in nursing before leaving the order for unknown reasons in 1878. She emigrated from England on the Cuzco arriving in Melbourne on 15 November 1878.

== Anglican ministry ==
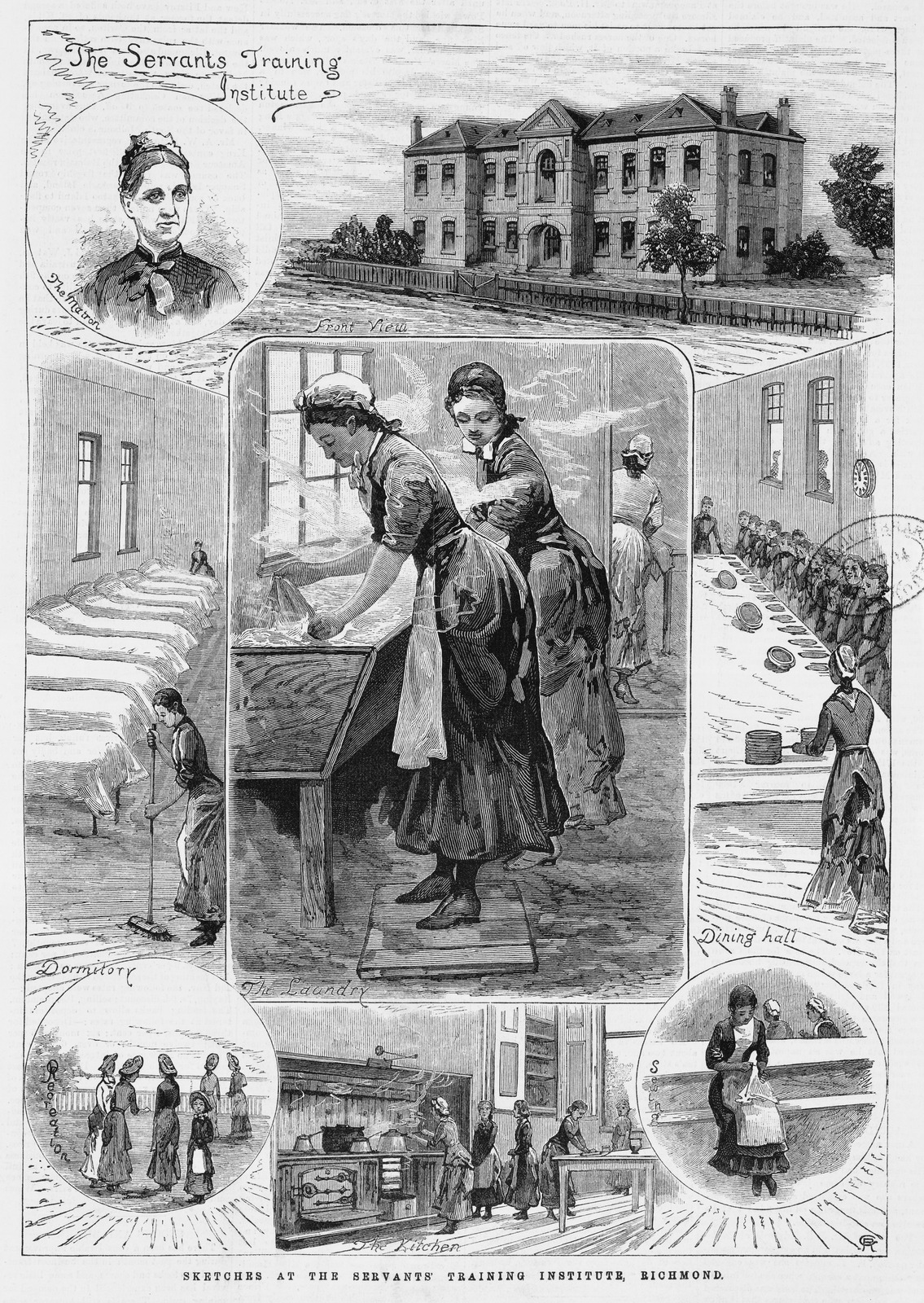
Marion Macfarlane is portrayed in the top left corner.

From 1879 to 1884 Macfarlane was Matron of the Servants Training Institute, a new Church of England initiative in East Melbourne designed to prepare girls for domestic service. This brought her into close contact with Mary Moorhouse, wife of the Bishop of Melbourne, and other leading women in Melbourne Anglicanism. On 8 February 1884 Macfarlane was ordained to the "Female Diaconate" by James Moorhouse, the Anglican Bishop of Melbourne, at Christ Church, South Yarra. Bishop Moorhouse intended her to be the founding member of a Melbourne Deaconesses Home, an idea he had first advocated to the Melbourne Church Assembly in 1882, citing the revival of the Order of Deaconesses in the English Church in 1861. Little is known of her ministry. She initially worked with H. F. Tucker, the Vicar of Christ Church South Yarra, and appears later to have lived at Bishopscourt, East Melbourne, with Bishop and Mrs Moorhouse.

== Later years and death ==
In early 1886 the Moorhouses left Melbourne. Within a few months Macfarlane converted to Roman Catholicism and joined the Sisters of the Good Shepherd at Oakleigh with the name in religion of Sister Mary Euphrasia. She became a novice in 1887 and was professed in 1891. She died on 29 April 1898 at the Oakleigh convent and was buried at Booroondara Cemetery, Kew.

== Historical significance ==
Until recently, the first Anglican deaconess in Australia was thought to be Mary Schleicher, who became a deaconess in the Diocese of Sydney in 1886. Macfarlane's appointment was two years earlier. It has been suggested that Macfarlane's ordination was overlooked because of her conversion from Anglicanism to Catholicism in the sectarian atmosphere of the 1880s.

The establishment of an order of deaconess within the Anglican communion in the mid-1800s was controversial, a controversy which extended to Melbourne in the 1880s. The diaconate was one of three established orders of Anglican ministry, reserved at that time to men only. Deacons were considered to be clergy, although they could not administer some sacraments. With widespread opposition to women joining the clergy, there was significant confusion about the role of deaconesses: some saw them as female equivalents to male clergy, others as a form of women's religious order. In the Anglican Church in Australia debates over the role of the deaconess were never resolved, and from the 1960s became part of the wider debate about the ordination of women as deacons, priests and bishops.

Macfarlane's ordination was unusual in that it took place in the high church Anglican context of Melbourne rather than the Evangelical Sydney, and explicitly used the language of ordination. Peter Sherlock argues that since Macfarlane was ordained with the episcopal laying on of hands, with Bishop Moorhouse intending to create a "Female Diaconate", she should be considered to be the first woman to be a member of the clergy in the Anglican Church in Australia.
