= Vagla =

Vagla may be,

- Vagla language, Ghana
- VaGla (Piotr Waglowski, Polish lawyer)
