= Golden Lane =

Street in Prague Castle, Czechia

Coordinates: 50.0922°N 14.4039°E

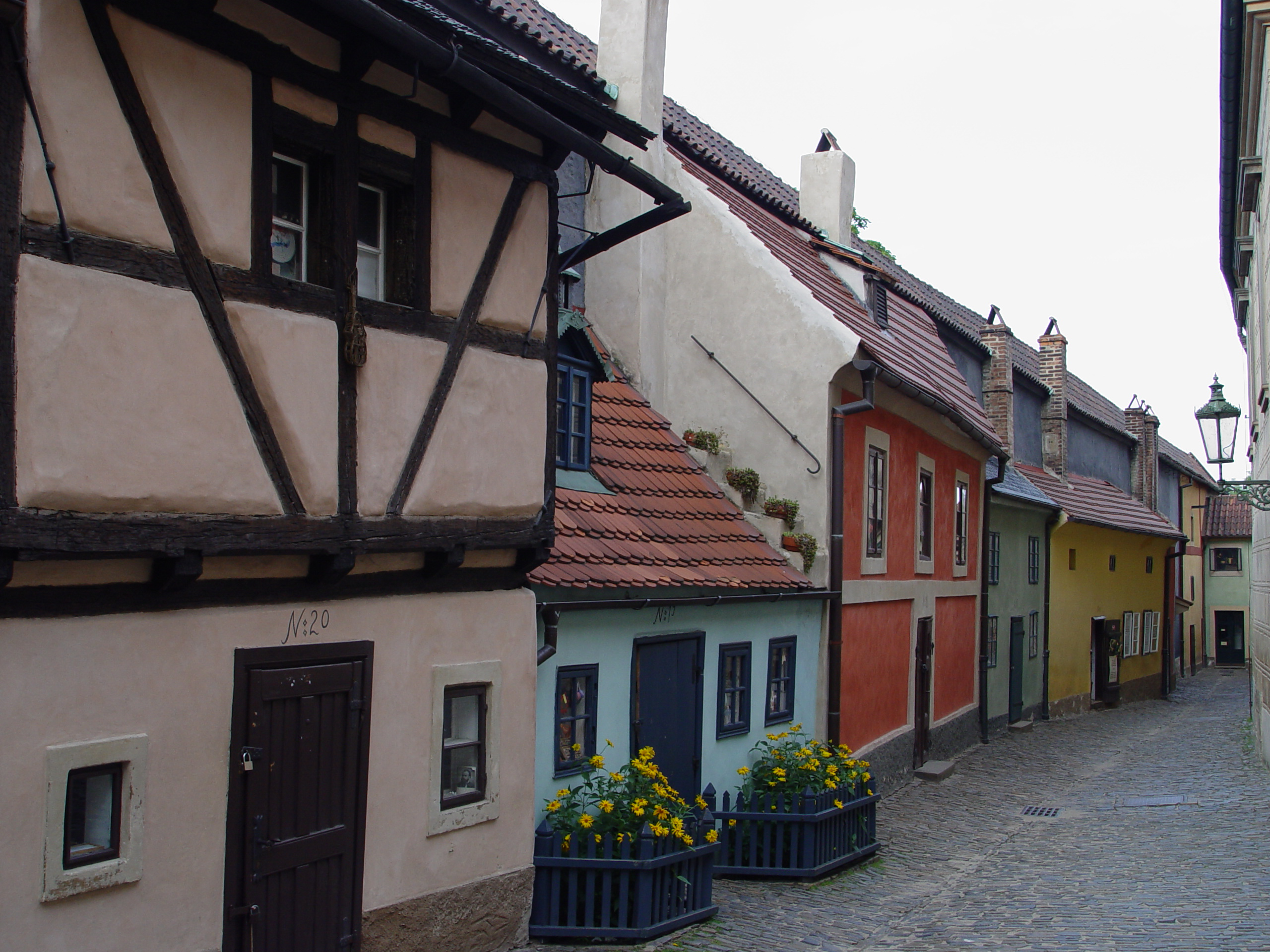
Golden Lane

Golden Lane (Czech: Zlatá ulička) is a street situated in Prague Castle, Czech Republic. Originally built in the 16th century to house Rudolf II's castle guards, it takes its name from the goldsmiths that lived there in the 17th century.

Golden Lane consists of small houses, painted in bright colours in the 1950s. The street originally had houses on both sides, but one side was demolished in the 19th century. Today, the lane is a part of the small and big castle rings (i.e. a fee must be paid to enter), while there is free entry after the Prague Castle interiors close. Many of the houses are now souvenir shops, and there is a museum of medieval armory within the former 14th-century fortification accessible from Golden Lane.

The fortuneteller Matylda Průšová lived in number 14 before World War II. A sister of writer Franz Kafka rented the house number 22 in the summer of 1916; Kafka used this house to write for approximately one year. Jaroslav Seifert, who won the Nobel Prize in Literature in 1984 and who was one of the signatories of Charter 77, lived there in 1929.

Golden Lane is connected with Dalibor Tower, which used to be a dungeon.
