= Fanny Purdy Palmer =

American journalist

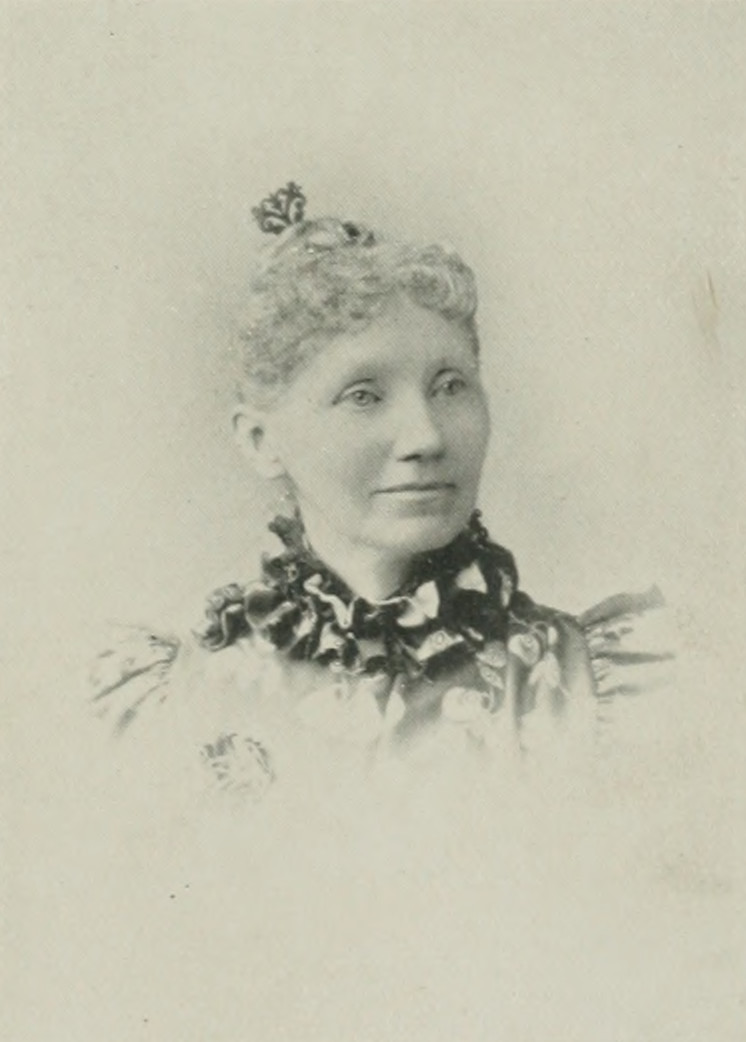
- Photo in A Woman of the Century
- Born: Mary Francis Purdy; July 11, 1839; New York City, New York, U.S.
- Died: 1923 (aged 83–84)
- Resting place: Woodstock Hill Cemetery, Woodstock, New York, U.S.
- Other names: Fanny; Fannie
- Education: Convent of the Sacred Heart; Packer Collegiate Institute
- Occupations: author, poet, journalist, lecturer, social activist, clubwoman
- Spouse: William H. Palmer (m. 1862)
- Children: 2
- Writing career
- Pen name: Florio
- Notable awards: Rhode Island Heritage Hall of Fame

Fanny Purdy Palmer (née, Purdy; pen name, Florio; July 11, 1839 – 1923) was an American author, poet, journalist, lecturer, social activist, and clubwoman. She began club work in 1876 and was one of the originators of the General Federation of Women's Clubs. She served as president of the Rhode Island Woman's Club, was a member of the school committee of the city of Providence, Rhode Island, and was connected with various philanthropic and social movements, including women's suffrage. A diligent reader of some of the best scientific and metaphysical works, for many years, she was a writer of stories which appeared in various weekly and monthly publications, stories which have dealt with the problems of life.

== Early life and education ==
Mary Francis (nickname, "Fanny" or "Fannie") Purdy was born in New York City, New York, July 11, 1839. She was the only child of Henry and Mary Catherine Sharp Purdy, descended on her father's side from Capt. Purdy, of the British army, who was killed in the Battle of White Plains, and a member of whose family was among the early settlers of Westchester County, New York. On the maternal side, Palmer descended of the Shams, a family of Scotch origin settled in Albany, New York, about 1750, and having descendants for four generations residing in New York City.

Palmer had the advantage of a good early education, acquired in part in the Convent of the Sacred Heart, in Eggertsville, a suburb of Buffalo, New York, and later in Packer Collegiate Institute, Brooklyn, New York.

== Career ==
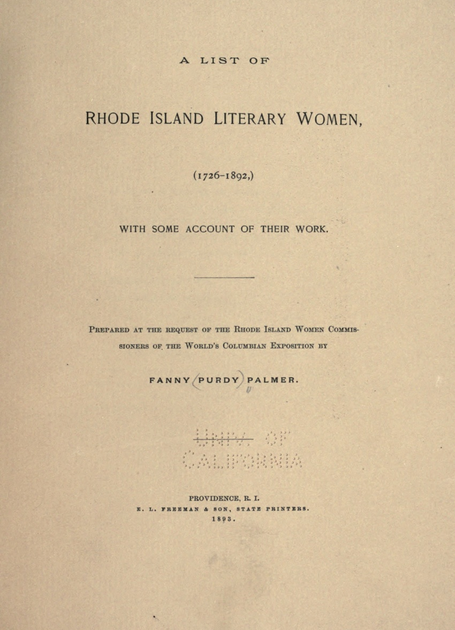
Rhode Island Literary Women, 1893

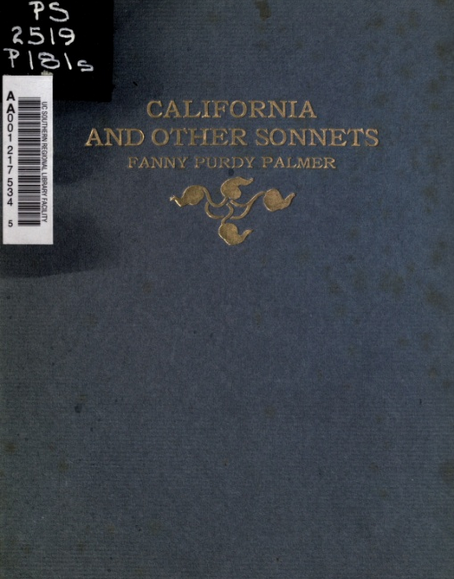
California and Other Sonnets, 1909

Dates and Days in Europe By an American resident in London, 1915

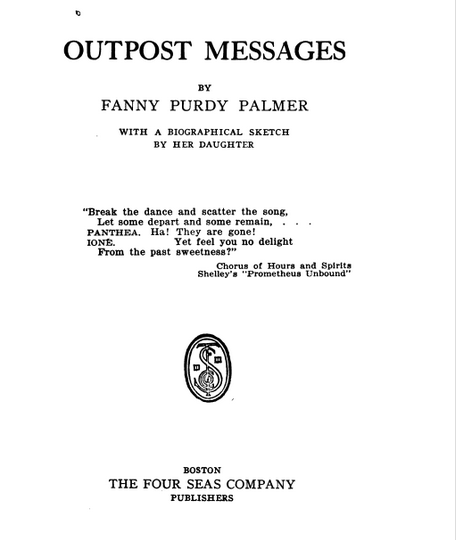
Outpost Message by Fanny Purdy Palmer With a Biographical Sketch by Her Daughter, 1924

Her literary bent was early indicated by contributions to the Home Journal over the pen name of "Florio", and to Putnam's Magazine and Peterson's Magazine.

On October 7, 1862, she married Dr. William H. Palmer, Surgeon of the Third New York Cavalry, and accompanied him to the seat of the civil war, there continuing her literary work, during the four years which ensued, by short stories and poems for Harper's periodicals and The Galaxy, and letters to various newspapers from North Carolina and Virginia.

In 1867, Dr. and Mrs. Palmer located in Providence, Rhode Island. During those years, she was continuously identified with all the prominent measures for the advancement of women and with many philanthropic and educational movements. From 1876 to 1884, she served as a member of the Providence school committee. For several years, she was secretary of the Rhode Island Woman Suffrage Association. For the year, 1891-92 she was president of the Woman's Educational and Industrial Union; and from 1884 to 1894, she was the president of the Rhode Island Women's Club. In 1895, at the Second Biennial Meeting of the General Federation of Women's Clubs, an organization which comprised between 500 and 600 women's clubs and included more than a million members in the U.S., she was elected auditor. The following year, as President of the Short Story Club, she attended the Third Biennial Meeting of the General Federation of Women's Clubs.

Her public work was accompanied by habits of systematic private study and of professional literary employment involving regular work on one or two weekly newspapers. Palmer affiliated with various parlor clubs and reading circles, and her own reading, especially in philosophy and history, gave her a mental discipline and a wide range of culture.

She was appointed factory inspector of Rhode Island in 1895, and served in that capacity three years, while her interests were greatly centered on the compulsory education law for children under 14. She took special interest in popularizing the study of American history, having herself prepared and given a series of "Familiar Talks on American History" as a branch of the educational work of the Women's Educational and Industrial Union. She was one of the managers of the Providence Free Kindergarten Association, and served as secretary of a society organized to secure for women the educational privileges of Brown University.

She was the author of a volume of short stories, A Dead Level and Other Episodes (Buffalo, 1892), as well as A List of Rhode Island Literary Women (1893); California and Other Sonnets (1909); Dates and Days in Europe By an American resident in London (1915); and Outpost Message by Fanny Purdy Palmer With a Biographical Sketch by Her Daughter (1924, with Henrietta R. Palmer).

== Personal life ==
By 1902, Palmer was living in La Jolla, California where she owned a home, though she spent much of her time abroad. She had two children, a son and a daughter (Henrietta), the latter having studied at Bryn Mawr College.

== Death and legacy ==
Palmer died in 1923. Posthumously, her daughter, Henrietta, published Outpost Message by Fanny Purdy Palmer With a Biographical Sketch by Her Daughter, in 1924.

On May 28, 1924, the City of Providence received the sum of US$5,000 to be known as the "Dr. William H. Palmer Trust Fund" and to be expended for hospital purposes under the direction of the Board of Hospital Commissioners. This sum was bequeathed by Fannie to her daughter, Henrietta, to be held in trust and the interest therefrom to revert to her for life and then to revert to the City of Providence as a gift in memory of Dr. William H. Palmer, late husband of Fannie. Henrietta by deed transferred and assigned her life interest in said trust fund to the City of Providence as a part of said gift of her mother in memory of her father, and she authorized and directed the Rhode Island Hospital Trust Company, executor under the will of Fannie, to pay to the City of Providence the sum of US$5,000, free and discharged from the trust created in her favor. The City Council under date of May 12, 1924, in accepting this gift extended to Henrietta the thanks of the city for assigning her life interest in said fund to the City of Providence, thus making the principal sum of US$5,000 immediately available for hospital work.

== Awards and honors ==
In 2020, she was inducted into the Rhode Island Heritage Hall of Fame.

== Selected works ==
- A List of Rhode Island Literary Women, (1726-1892,) With Some Account of Their Work., 1893
- California and Other Sonnets, 1909
- Dates and Days in Europe By an American resident in London, 1915
- Outpost Message by Fanny Purdy Palmer With a Biographical Sketch by Her Daughter, 1924
