= Madame de Thèbes =

Pseudonym of clairvoyants

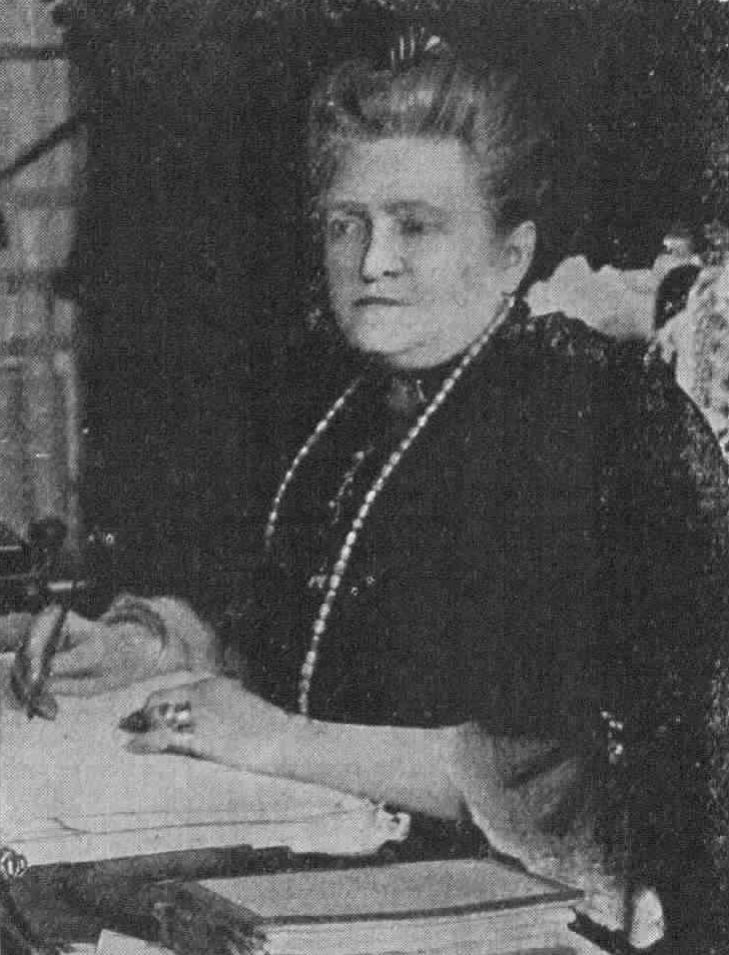
Madame de Thèbes (Anne-Victorine Savigny)

Madame de Thèbes is the pseudonym of two fortunetellers living in Europe between the late nineteenth century and the end of World War II. The usage of the name has also entered popular culture, which includes characters based loosely on the life experiences of the historical figures.

== Origin ==
de Thèbes means "of Thebes" in French, which refers to the city of Thebes in ancient Egypt. The name was suggested by French writer and playwright Alexandre Dumas fils to Anne-Victorine Savigny with inspiration from his psychological drama La Route de Thèbes about a mysterious woman, which was his final work and was never finished.

== Historical figures ==
=== France ===
Anne-Victorine Savigny (1844–1916), or Anne-Victorine de Savigny, was a French clairvoyant and palm reader. She is the main source of reference for the name Madame de Thèbes. Savigny was born in Ménilmontant, a neighborhood in Paris. She first worked as a cashier before becoming a tutor for a bourgeois family in 1877. She became an actress with the stage name Mademoiselle Dhalyle from around 1882. She delved into divination in the 1890s and studied chiromancy under Adolphe Desbarrolles. During this period, Savigny became personal friend of Alexandre Dumas fils through introduction of the painter Louis-Eugène Lambert, a shared friend of the two. Dumas fils helped Savigny expand her social circle among the high society members of Paris at the time and Savigny became an established figure in fortunetelling by the time Dumas fils died in 1895. Savigny's clientele include luminaries such as Marcel Proust and Queen Natalie of Serbia, among others. She plied her trade from her living room at No. 29 Avenue de Wagram in Paris. Every Christmas since 1903, she published her prophecies in an Almanac, which enjoyed wide circulation. She was said to have predicted the following world events:

- The Boer War;
- The Russo-Japanese War;
- Triggers of World War I;
- The violent death of General Boulanger;
- The tragic death of Catulle Mendès;
- The death of William Thomas Stead;
- The case of Caillaux.

She published several books including The Enigma of the Dream: Explanation of Dreams, which appeared in 1908. She died in Paris in 1916 at the age of 73 in her country home and was buried in the Père Lachaise cemetery.

=== Czech Republic ===
Matylda Průšová (? – c. 1944) was a Czech fortuneteller who lived in the house No. 14 in the Golden Lane of Prague. She was a widow of a pharmacist and also made a living by embroidery in addition to fortunetelling. She predicted the downfall of the Third Reich. During World War II, she was captured by the Nazis and was killed around 1944.

== Popular culture ==
- Madame de Thèbes is a 1915 Swedish silent film directed by Mauritz Stiller. Actress Ragna Wettergreen played the namesake role.
- The French historian Geneviève Tabouis was called Madame de Thèbes and Cassandra because of her writings as a columnist for the left-wing newspaper L’Oeuvre since the 1930s.
- Madame de Thèbes is a fortuneteller played by actress Marcelle Corday in the 1944 film Mrs. Parkington.
- Madame de Thèbes, based on Matylda Průšová, is a character in the Italian comic book series Dampyr created by Sergio Bonelli.
- In the romance The Revolt of the Angels by Anatole France, Madame de Thèbes is quoted as the wisest seer of her time.

== See also ==
- The Prophetess of Thebes
- Valentine Dencausse
