= Packer Collegiate Institute =

Prep school in Brooklyn, New York, US

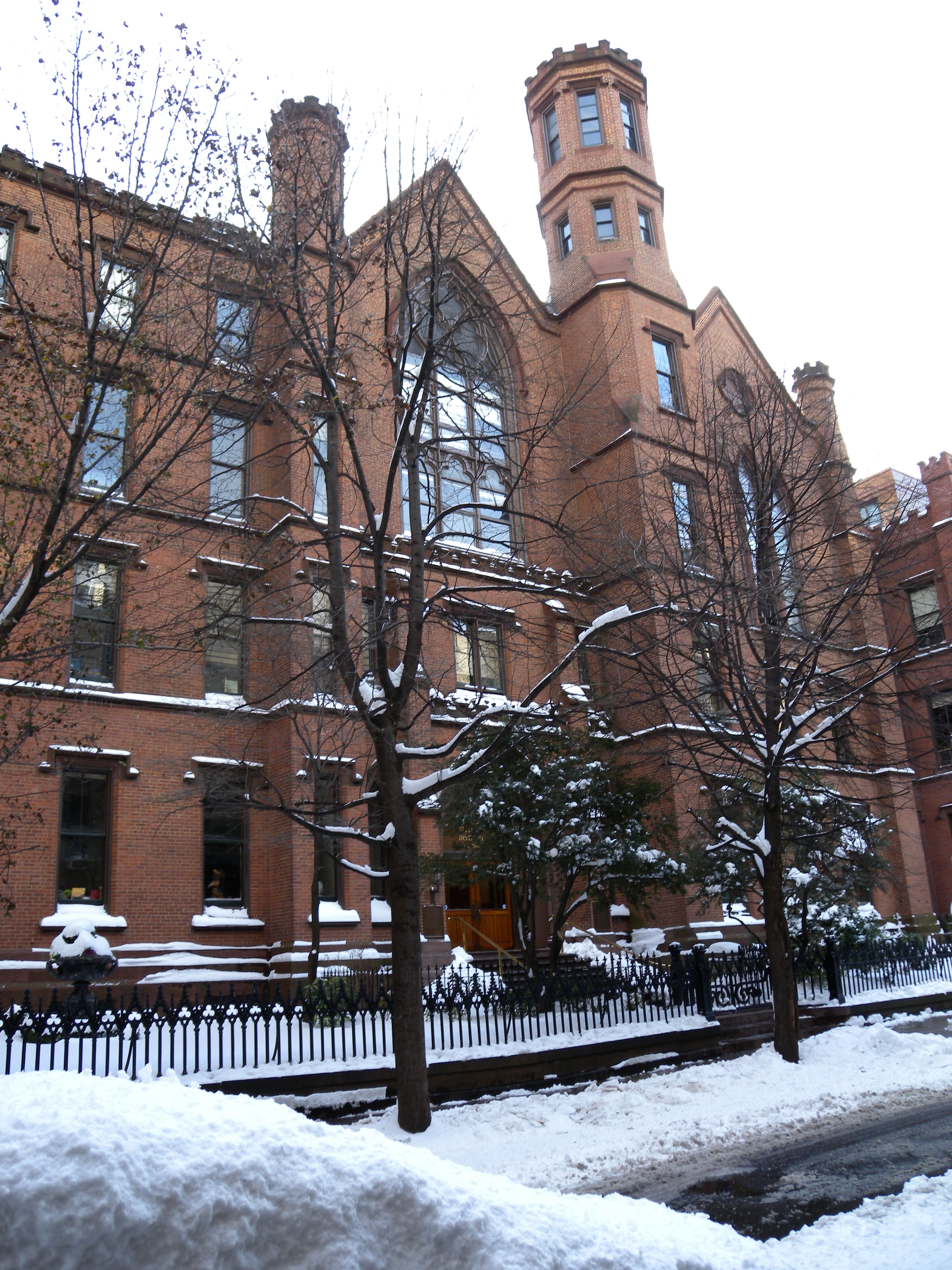
- (2009)

Location
- 170 Joralemon Street; Brooklyn, New York City 11201; United States; 40°41′33″N 73°59′33″W

Information
- School type: Independent
- Motto: Macte Virtute (Well Done)
- Founded: 1845; 181 years ago
- Chair: OhSang Kwon
- Head of school: Jennifer Weyburn
- Faculty: Fulltime: 131; Parttime: 15
- Grades: pre-K–12
- Enrollment: 1,000+ (2020)
- Colors: Maroon & White
- Mascot: Pelican
- Newspaper: The Packer Prism
- Endowment: $30 million
- Website: packer.edu

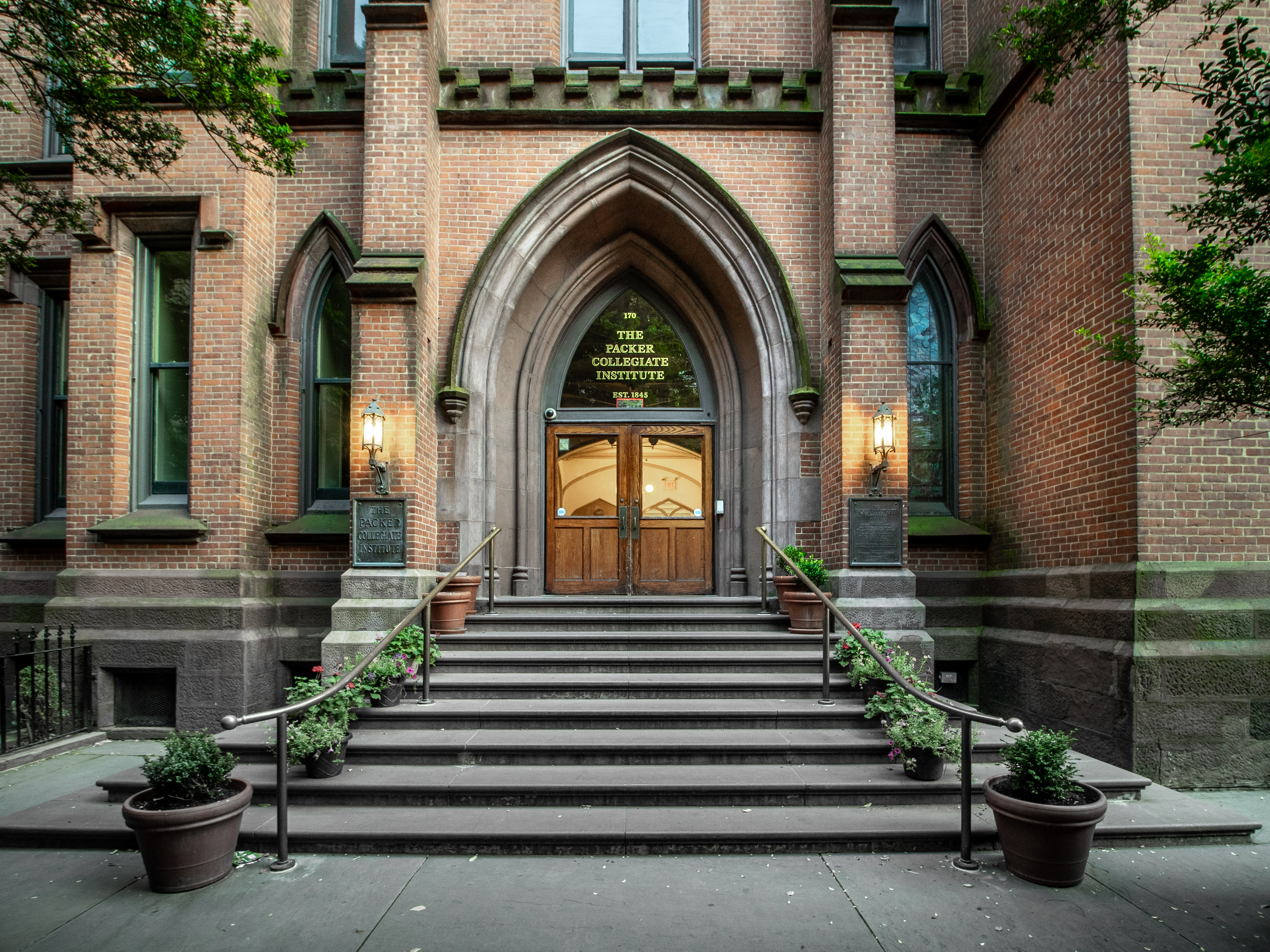
Entrance of the school

The Packer Collegiate Institute is an independent college preparatory school for students from pre-kindergarten through grade 12. Formerly the Brooklyn Female Academy, Packer has been located at 170 Joralemon Street in the historic district of Brooklyn Heights neighborhood of Brooklyn, New York City, since its founding in 1845.

== History ==
In Brooklyn Heights in 1845, a committee of landowners and merchants interested in improving the education of girls raised funds for a new school, which they called the Brooklyn Female Academy, and which they located on Joralemon Street. Although the school was successful, both financially and educationally, with steadily increasing enrollment, on January 1, 1853, the building caught fire and burned to the ground.

The Academy received an offer from Harriet L. Packer, the widow of William S. Packer, to give $65,000 towards rebuilding the school if it were named after her late husband; this would be the largest gift ever made for the education of girls. The new building was designed by Minard Lafever, a noted designer of Brooklyn churches, and opened in November 1854. The chapel is notable for having stained-glass Tiffany windows.

After the Episcopal parish of St. Ann's, whose James Renwick-designed church at Livingston and Clinton street was around the corner from the school, moved into the abandoned Holy Trinity Church on Montague Street – also designed by Minard Lafever – in 1969, the church was sold to the school. A modernist connecting building, including a glass atrium which can be seen from Livingston Street, was added in 2003, designed by Hugh Hardy of H3 Collaborative Architecture.

Until 1972 Packer was primarily a girls’ school, with boys attending only kindergarten through fourth grade while girls and young women were enrolled through high school as well as a two-year junior college. The junior college program is no longer operational.

== Arts ==
Packer has visual arts, photography, media arts, dance, drama, orchestra, brass choir, chamber music, wind ensemble, chorus and a Middle and Upper School jazz band. Among Packer's facilities lies the Janet Clinton Performing Arts Center, which features instrumental and choral music classrooms, a dance studio and the Pratt Theater.

== Notable alumni and faculty ==
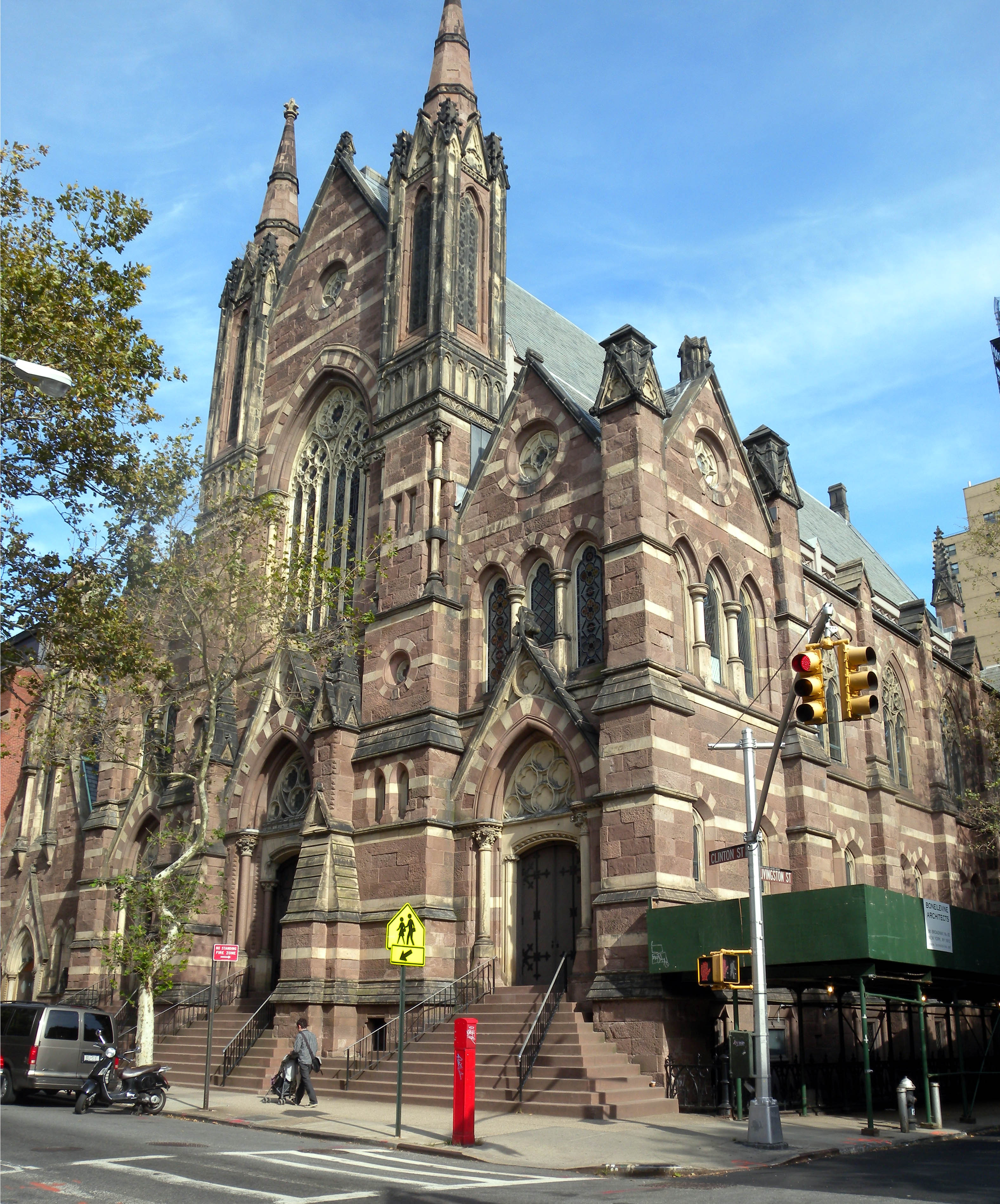
The James Renwick–designed former St. Ann's Church, now part of the school, has stained glass by Henry E. Sharp.

- Frances Julia Barnes (1846–1920), temperance reformer
- Judi Barrett, 1958, author (Cloudy with a Chance of Meatballs)
- Mary C. C. Bradford, educator and suffragist
- Emma F. R. Campbell, 1859, poet, author, and hymn writer, teacher who wrote a notable hymn of her time: "Jesus of Nazareth Passeth By"...
- Cornelia Chase Brant, Dean of New York Medical College and Hospital for Women
- Mary Bunting, 1929, president of Radcliffe College and first woman appointed to the Atomic Energy Commission
- Lucy Burns, suffragist
- Caroline Chesebro' (1825–1873), writer
- Elizabeth Gaffney, editor and author (Metropolis: A Novel)
- Virginia Granbery, painter
- Ethan Hawke, attended the 7th grade; actor (Reality Bites, Dead Poets Society), writer and producer
- Virginia Heinlein, 1935, wife of and co-author with Robert A. Heinlein
- Elisabeth Irwin, 1897, founder of Little Red Schoolhouse
- Tadzio Koelb, novelist and critic
- Malcolm D. Lee, 1988, film and television director (Roll Bounce, Everybody Hates Chris, Undercover Brother)
- Minnie Dessau Louis (1841–1922), educator
- Lois Lowry (born 1937), 1954, author (Number the Stars, The Giver)
- Dorothy Marckwald (1898–1986), interior designer
- Pauline Van de Graaf Orr (1861–1955), educator and suffragist
- Mary Orwen (1913–2005), abstract artist, art instructor
- Mary White Ovington (1865–1951), 1890, author, civil rights leader, co-founder and Executive Secretary of the NAACP
- Fanny Purdy Palmer (1839–1923), author, lecturer, activist
- Dora Knowlton Ranous (1859–1916), author, editor, translator, book reviewer
- Lincoln Restler, 2002, politician
- Darrian Robinson, 2012, chess player
- Owen Casey, debate national champion
- Dare Rose, 2020, swimmer
- Rosanna Scotto, 1976, television news anchor, FOX 5 News (New York City)
- Lauren Scruggs, 2021, silver medalist in Individual Fencing at the 2024 Paris Olympics
- Helen Sewell (1896–1957), illustrator and writer
- Emily Elizabeth Veeder, novelist, poet
- Marion Wells, 1948, socialite and philanthropist
- Lois Wilson, 1912, founder of Al-Anon, and wife of Bill Wilson, the founder of Alcoholics Anonymous.
- Deborah Ann Woll, 2003, actress (True Blood and Daredevil)
- Mary Woronov, 1962, member of Andy Warhol's Factory.
- Marie Zimmermann, designer and maker of jewelry and metalwork

== In popular culture ==
- Packer can be seen as a set for the CW television series Gossip Girl in multiple episodes throughout the first three seasons, as both interior and exterior locations.
