= J. P. Dabney =

American writer and poet (1850-1934)

Julia Parker Dabney
- Born: September 2, 1850; Fayal, Azores, Portugal
- Died: 1932 (age 81-82)

Julia Parker Dabney (1850 – 1932) was a Portuguese-born American writer and poet.

== Biography ==
Julia Parker was the middle daughter of Mary Anne (Marianne) Dabney Parker and William Henry Dabney. Her father was the youngest son of American diplomat and wine merchant John Bass Dabney and his wife Roxa. A member of one of the first Boston families to settle in the Azores as whaling and wine merchants and American diplomats, Julia was a descendant of Robert and Elizabeth D'Aubingé, French Huguenots who were early settlers in America in the early eighteenth century.

Julia grew up in Teneriffe, Canary Islands, where her father was U.S. consul between 1862 and 1882. She was educated at home and studied art with several Spanish painters. In 1868 she studied in Boston under William Morris Hunt and Helen M. Knowlton.

In 1873, Dabney moved to Boston where she was a painter and sculptor. Due to ill health she abandoned her art, later turning to literature and poetry. She published several volumes of poetry, two novels (both set in the Canary Islands), and two plays. She also published short stories and poems in American periodicals. In 1901 she was listed as an artist and novelist living in Brookline, Massachusetts. She died in 1932.

== Bibliography ==
- Dabney, J. P. (Julia Parker) (1925), Waters of life : a drama in four acts, Torch Press
- Dabney, J. P (1923). The Primal poet. Boston: Vedanta Centre.
- Dabney, Julia Parker (1907). Mademoiselle Merowska; a play in three acts. Brookline, Mass.: Priv. Print.
- Dabney, Julia Parker (1898). Songs of Destiny and Others. New York: E.P. Dutton.
- Dabney, Julia Parker (1896). Little Daughter of the Sun. Boston: Roberts Bros.
