= Valentine Dencausse =

French palm reader

Valentine Dencausse (20 May 1871 – 16 February 1954), best known as Madame Fraya, was a famous chiromancer in Paris during the first half of the 20th century.

== Biography ==
Madame Fraya would use a person's hand and handwriting to predict his/her future, but she admitted to not following the principles of traditional chiromancy, and just making use of her instinctual knowledge. Her clients included important French artists and politicians of the time, such as the Princess Charlotte of Prussia, Duchess of Saxe-Meiningen (sister of emperor Wilhelm II of Germany), to whom she reportedly predicted World War I and the defeat of Germany in it. She was subsequently called into the French Ministry of War, where she assured the government that the marching German troops would not reach Paris (they were in fact stopped at the First Battle of the Marne). The abilities displayed by Fraya were studied by Alfred Binet, Eugéne Osty, and Albert von Schrenck-Notzing.

Biographer Simone de Tervagne has written several books about Fraya.

== Investigations ==
In December 1929, Antônio da Silva Mello attended a psychic reading session with Madame Fraya. Mello brought with him some letters. Fraya made totally inaccurate statements about the letters, for example on studying a letter that Mello had written the same morning she stated it was written by someone else and gave excessively general characterisation details that would be applicable to most people. She said one of the letters had been written by a man but it had actually been written by a female relative of Mello.

Fraya also gave many false statements to Mello. She said he was the father of two children when he did not have any. She examined his hand and stated he was thirty-two years old, although he was forty-three at the time. Mello noted that "the revelations obtained in my consultation with Madame Fraya were no more than vague generalities, which would be commonly applied to any person."

Mello also attended a session with Fraya in January, 1930. The result was a complete failure, she made many incorrect statements. Mello "left her office annoyed and disillusioned".

Fraya duped the psychical researcher Eugéne Osty into believing she had genuine psychic powers.

== See also ==
- Madame de Thèbes
