= Emily Elizabeth Veeder =

American poet

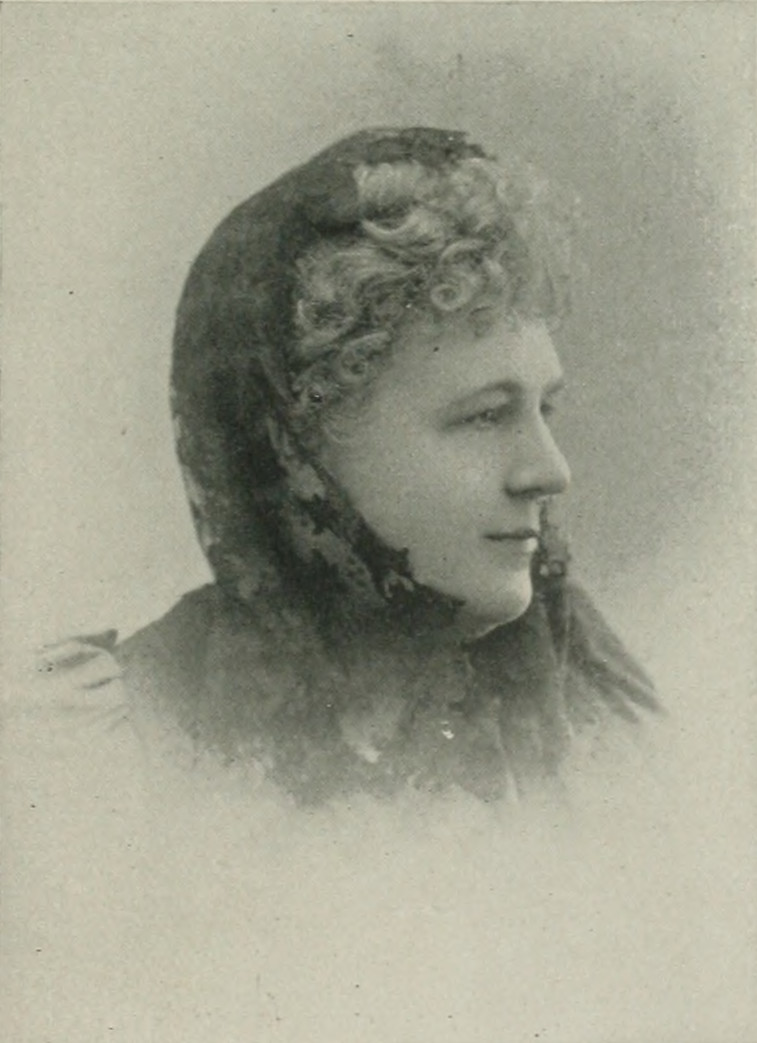
- "A Woman of the Century"
- Born: Emily Elizabeth Ferris; 1841 valley of Lake Champlain, New York, U.S.
- Died: April 27, 1898 (aged 56-57)
- Education: Packer Collegiate Institute
- Occupations: Novelist, poet
- Spouse: Herman Veeder (m. 1876)
- Writing career
- Notable works: Her Brother Donnard, In the Garden and Other Poems

Emily Elizabeth Veeder (née, Ferris; 1841 – April 27, 1898) was an American novelist and poet. Her first book, the 1891 novel Her Brother Donnard, was successful enough that its second edition was released within the year. Her publication In the Garden and Other Poems in 1895 included her popular poems "The Twilight Hour", "In My Dreams", and "A Voice". She wrote after having become infirm in a railway accident.

== Early life and education ==
Emily Elizabeth Ferris was born in 1841, in the valley of Lake Champlain, in New York. On one side of the family, she was the granddaughter of Judge McOmlier. Her paternal grandmother was a poet. Bishop Daniel Ayres Goodsell was her cousin.

Veeder was a student in Packer Collegiate Institute, Brooklyn, New York. She wrote verses at the age of nine, but it was the direct influence of her brother-in-law, Asahel Stearns, a professor of law, and of the notable people who gathered about him and her sister, which elevated her taste for literature and rendered it absorbing. Her culture was increased by travel and by contact with many others. She married Herman Veeder, on September 28, 1876.

== Career ==
Her first book was Her Brother Donnard (Philadelphia, 1891). Veeder occasionally contributed verses to prominent periodicals. Her first appearance with a collected volume of poetry, however, was in the book to which the first poem, "In The Garden", gave its title (1895). She arranged several of her poems to music of her own composition. Much of the time, she was exhausted by her disability. In her hours of pain, she rose above physical suffering and her habitual temper was buoyant and helpful. She possessed originality and piquancy. A keen observation of human nature and a nice discrimination of character give point to her conversation and her literary work. She was very facile with anecdotes. Some of her purely outdoor work shows her genuine love of nature; while in her versified story, "Entranced", her narrative power stood out, and her "Austin's Painting of Christ" revealed the true devotional bent of her mind.

In private life, Veeder was eminently practical. She was a member of the Woman's Press Club of Pittsburgh, in which city she resided until she visited the World's Columbian Exposition (1893). During that visit, she received injuries (consequent to a railway accident) which kept her in Chicago thereafter. At the Authors' Congress of the Columbian Exposition, Veeder originated and introduced the idea of an Author's Institute, which she hoped to establish in Chicago.

== Critical reception ==
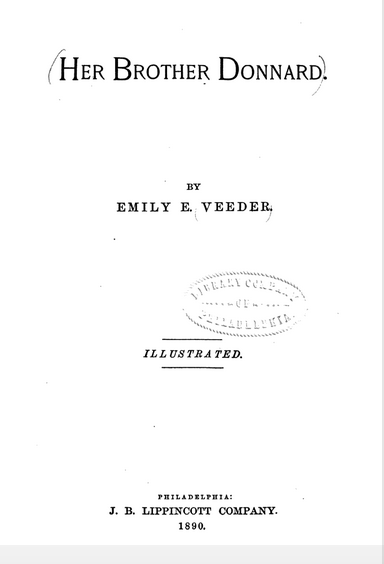
Her Brother Donnard

Her Brother Donnard (J. B. Lippincott Co.) was reviewed in 1891 by The Literary World (1891):

Judged by its crudity, this is the work of an inexperienced writer. The story is disjointed and incredible, and the characters are not only unnatural, but also untrue to themselves. There can be no such persons as Margaret and Macwood; while as for Maureen and her brother Donnard, it is not in human nature that a delicate and reticent girl should suddenly break out into such hysterical ravings, or that a boy so coarse and inconsiderate should, by an abrupt change, become a self-sacrificing, high-toned "Roman Catholic clergyman." The author, Emily E. Veeder, has talent, and seems able to write a much better novel than this.

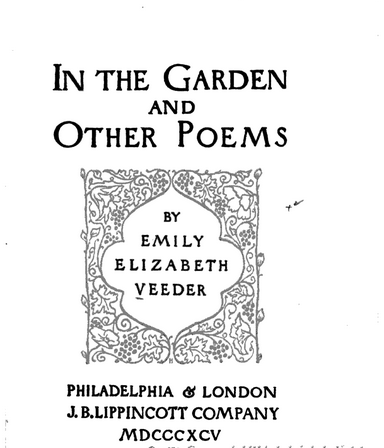
In the Garden and Other Poems

In the Garden, and Other Poems was reviewed in 1895 by the Boston Courier:

"A choice little book of poems of tender sentiment and harmonious thought this, by Emily Elizabeth Veeder, which she dedicates to her husband. The outer covering is exquisitely in keeping with the sweet aroma of the verses within. Some of these poems are tremblingly pathetic, as 'The Beggars; a Story for Children.' All are enchanting for the simplicity of feeling displayed, the serene reflectiveness developed, and the melodious expression in which they are cast. The variety of themes sufficiently testifies to the versatility of the fancy, the breadth and sincerity of the feeling, and the sympathetic quality of the rhythmical expression. It is both a quaint and a dainty book, whose contents will find numerous appreciative readera that will receive only the quietest of influences from them into receptive hearts."

In the Garden was also reviewed in 1895 by Munsey's Magazine:

"The only serious feeling aroused by a perusal of Mrs. Emily Elizabeth Veeder's "In the Garden," is one of pity for such a total lack of poetic depth. Her thoughts are neither impressive nor original, and her expression of them is very crude and commonplace. The best lyric in the book is "In the Garden," and the worst "The Beggars," a poem for children. Writing verses for children sounds like a very easy task, but in reality, it is sufficiently difficult to alarm the most confident poet. It requires the dainty touch of a Frank Dempster Sherman, the bizarre originality of a Lewis Carroll, or the delicious naïveté and naturalness of a James Whitcomb Riley, really to reach tile child heart; and when we turn from such work as theirs to Mrs. Veeder's "Beggars," we shudder. It is a story in verse of a lost child and her dog Doo-doo, and the kind lady who finds them says with infinite pathos:

Come home with me, my little dear,
I'll find a place
For you to grace
With tender prayer. Doo-doo will come,
Yes, yes, to stay
With us alway.

It is sometimes a little difficult to catch exactly the drift of Mrs. Veeder's words in the other poems also, as when she says:

Come, let me yearn upon thy face.

We do not know just what it is or how it feels to have one's face yearned upon, but it sounds, somehow, as if it might hurt.
