= Mary Schleicher =

Australian Anglican deaconess

- Born: 1855; Mill Park, Victoria
- Died: July 1, 1949 (age 94); Marrickville, New South Wales
- Known for: First Deaconess in the Anglican Diocese of Sydney

Mary Schleicher (1855-1949) was the first deaconess in the Anglican Diocese of Sydney, appointed in 1886 to Newtown parish.

== Early life ==
Mary Augusta Sophia Schleicher was born in 1855 at Mill Park, Victoria. Her father John Theophilus Schleicher (d 1892) was an Anglican priest and CMS missionary. Her mother Caroline Schultze (d 1897) had trained at the deaconess institute at Kaiserswerth in Germany. The family arrived in Victoria, Australia in 1855 and Mary was born soon afterwards.

== Ministry ==
Mary was set apart as a deaconess on 25 July 1886 at St Stephen's Newtown by Bishop Barry, during a ceremony in which a male evangelist was also commissioned. Her admission as a deaconess followed a debate at the Sydney Anglican Synod in 1885 concerning creation of a deaconess institute, a proposal which sought to organise women's religious ministry in a way that avoided sectarian concerns about religious orders. Bishop Barry saw the role of deaconess in terms of lay ministry, rather than a form of ordination for women.

Mary's role as deaconess was to serve in the parish of Newtown under the direction of the rector, Robert Taylor, her duties including visiting homes of the poor. In 1889 Mary's sister Selma Schleicher became Sydney's second Anglican deaconess when she was commissioned for ministry, having already been ordained in Germany. Finally in 1891 Mary's brother was appointed Principal of Sydney's Moore Theological College. The Schleicher family were consequently instrumental in the establishment in 1891 of Deaconess House in Sydney as a training institution for Anglican deaconesses, known as "Bethany", and the forerunner of Mary Andrews College.

== Later life and death ==
Mary married Canon Robert Taylor, the newly widowed rector of her parish of Newtown, on 28 December 1898 at Gladesville, New South Wales. In accordance with local custom at the time she ceased to be considered a deaconess upon marriage. She died 1 July 1949 at Marrickville, New South Wales, aged 93.
