= Emma F. R. Campbell =

American hymn writer

- Born: Emma Frances Riggs Campbell; November 16, 1830; Newark, New Jersey, U.S.
- Died: February 25, 1919 (aged 88); Morristown, New Jersey, U.S.
- Occupations: Hymnwriter, author

Emma Frances Riggs Campbell (November 16, 1830 – February 25, 1919) was an American hymnwriter and author. She is best known for her hymn "Jesus of Nazareth Passeth By".

She was born on November 16, 1830 in Newark, New Jersey, one of eleven children of Abner Campbell, owner of a looking-glass and picture-framing business, and Deborah Conger. Her sister Catherine Smith Campbell married future Florida governor Ossian Bingley Hart.

Campbell graduated from the Packer Institute for Girls in Brooklyn, New York in 1959. She and a sister opened a school in Morristown, New Jersey in the 1860s. She taught Sunday school for 37 years at the First Presbyterian Church in Morristown.

"Jesus of Nazareth Passeth By" was inspired by an 1864 religious revival in Newark held by the Rev. Edward Payson Hammond, specifically a sermon mentioning Luke 18:37 and the story of Jesus healing the blind Bartimaeus. Campbell's hymn was first published using the Greek letter Eta as a pseudonym, which has led to Campbell being misidentified as Eta or Etta Campbell. The hymn was anthologized numerous times and was frequently performed by the gospel singer Ira D. Sankey.

Campbell published several other hymns, a collection of verse, several children's novels, and a short biography of her brother-in-law Ossian Hart.

Campbell died on February 25, 1919 in Morristown, New Jersey, aged 88.

== Bibliography ==
- Paul Preston; or, Who is the Hero? (1864)
- Green Pastures (1866)
- Better than Rubies; or, Mabel's Treasure (1869)
- Toward the Mark (1875)
- Biographical Sketch of Honorable Ossian B. Hart, Late Governor of Florida, 1873 (1901)
- The Hymn "Jesus of Nazareth passeth by" and Its History, and Other Verses (1909)
