= Adolphe Desbarrolles =

French artist

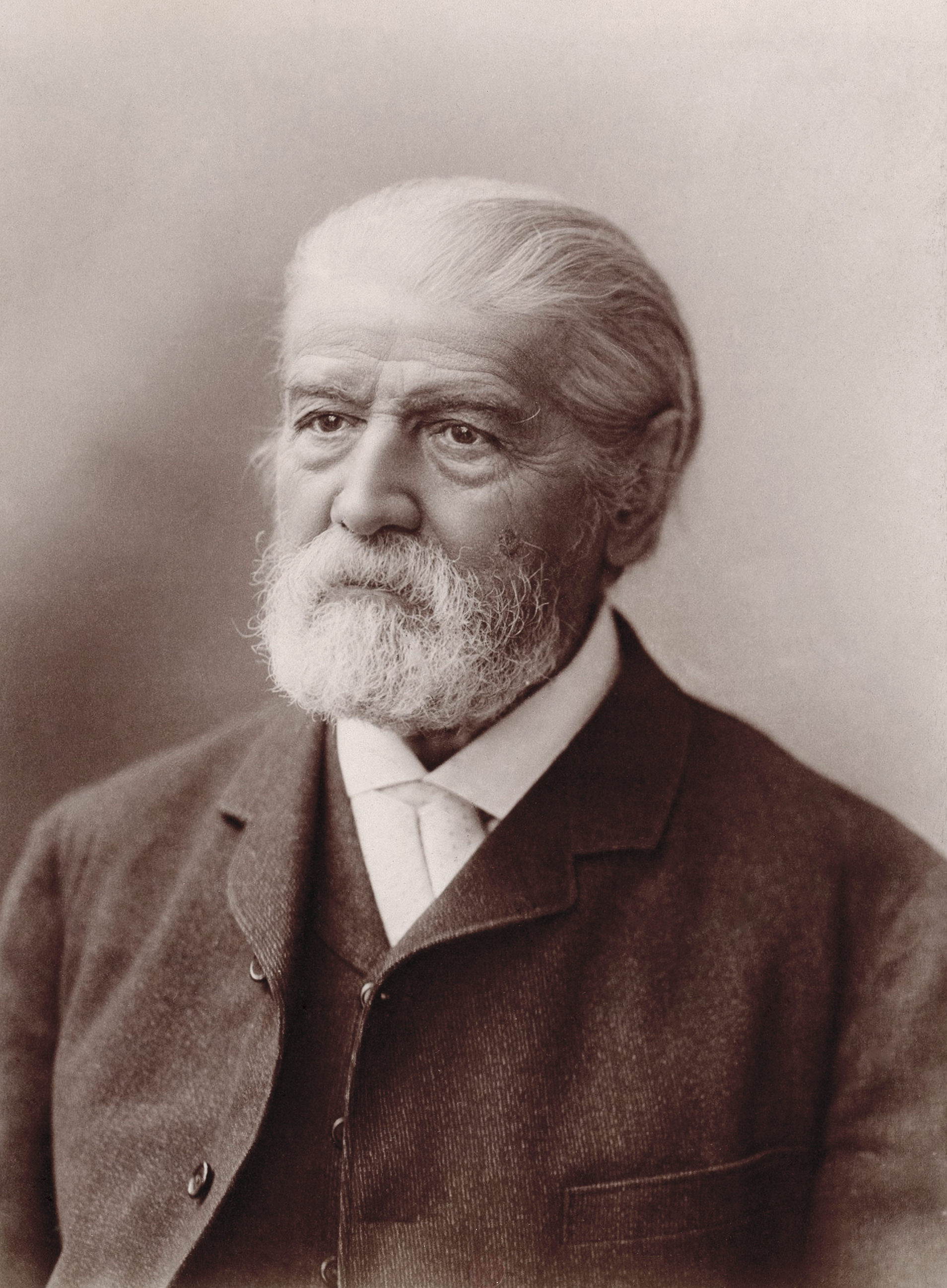
- Born: 22 August 1801; Paris
- Died: 11 February 1886 (aged 84); Paris
- Resting place: Père Lachaise Cemetery
- Occupation: Writer, lithographer

Signature
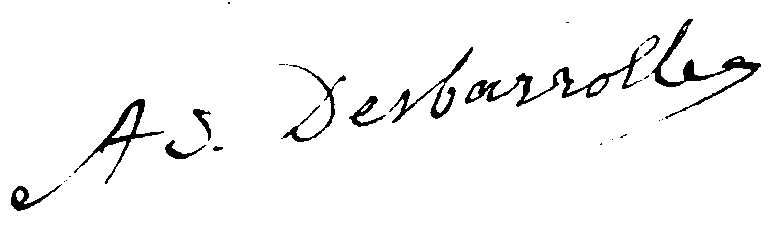

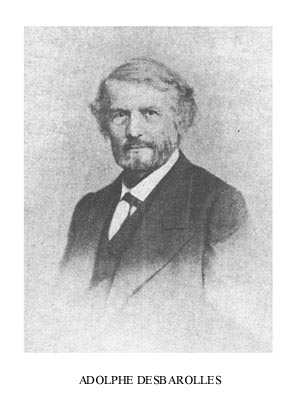
Adolphe Desbarrolles

Adolphe Desbarrolles (22 August 1801 – 11 February 1886) was a French artist. He is considered the father of modern chiromancy, aka palmistry or palm reading, a form of divination.

== Biography ==
Desbarolles was born in Paris, France. After completing his studies he spent three years in Germany before returning to France. Back in France he worked as a painter and writer before becoming interested in palmistry.

Desbarolles married and from this marriage there was a daughter, Marthe Desbarolles who also became a graphologist and continued her fathers work.

He died in Paris and was buried in the Pére Lachaise Cemetery.

He was a pupil and friend of Éliphas Lévi, who mentioned him in his Dogme et Rituel de la Haute Magie. He was also friend to Alexandre Dumas, concluding after reading Dumas' palm that would he die at 104 years of age, after a duel.

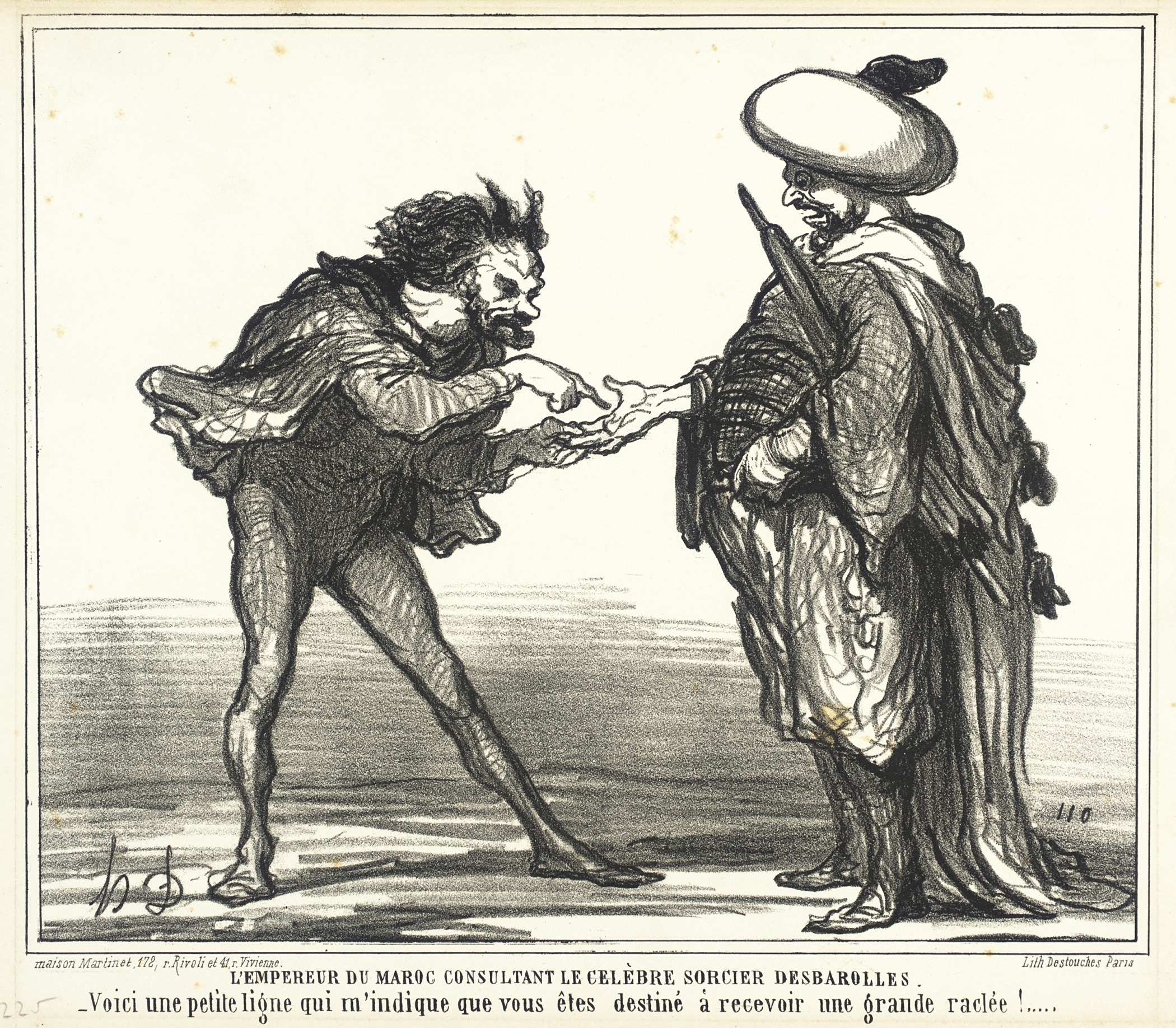
Satirical image depicting The Emperor of Marocco consulting the celebrated magician Desbarolles by Honoré Daumier from the Le Charivari, 13 December 1859

== Works ==
- "Les mystères de la main révélés et expliqués, art de connaître la vie, le caractère, les aptitudes et la destinée de chacun d'après la seule inspection des mains (chiromancie nouvelle)" (1860), Paris, Dentu, 624 p.
