= Piotr Waglowski =

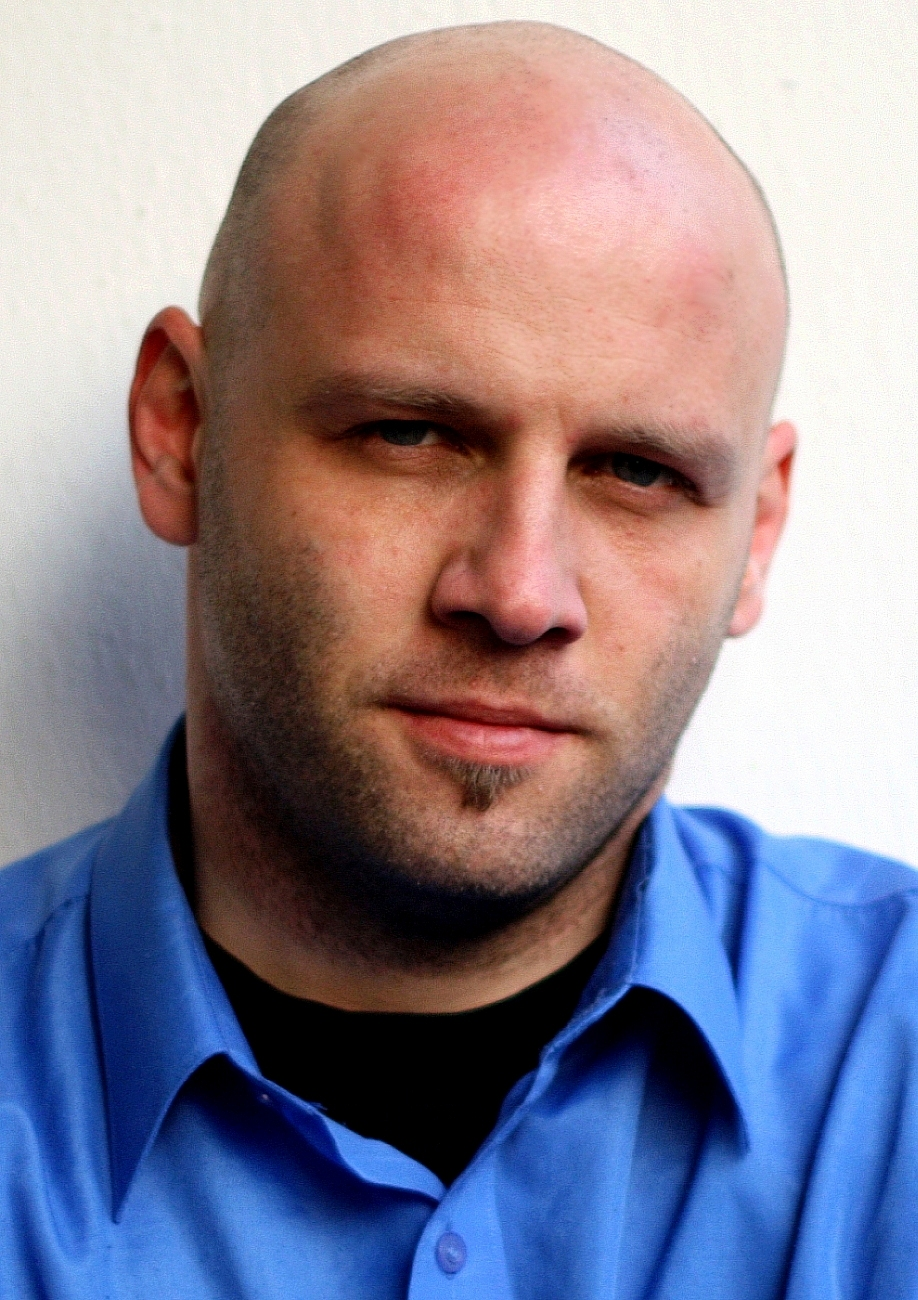
- Piotr Waglowski
- Born: 17 May 1974 (age 51); Warsaw
- Other names: VaGla
- Occupations: Lawyer, webmaster, author of publications on intellectual property (in particular on copyright and related rights), lecturer.
- Known for: contribution to informatization of Poland, contribution to the development of social consciousness of the information law in Poland
- Awards
- Website: www.prawo.vagla.pl

Piotr Waglowski (born 17 May 1974, Warsaw), known online as VaGla, is a Polish lawyer, publicist and webmaster, open government activist, researcher of communication processes in the paradigm of social constructionism.

== Academic activity and teaching ==
Waglowski specialised in the legal aspects of the information society and the legal analysis of the Internet-based projects. A graduate of the Faculty of Law and Administration, University of Warsaw, he dedicated his Master's thesis to the subject of infringement of personality rights on the Internet and their civil law protection based on the Civil Code. He studied at the doctoral level at the Institute of Law Studies, Polish Academy of Sciences, currently working on his PhD dissertation. His teaching experience is dedicated mostly to media education. He has taught at the Lazarski University in Warsaw, Warsaw School of Social Sciences and Humanities, and at the Faculty of Journalism and Political Studies of University of Warsaw.

== Public and social services ==
Waglowski is recognized as one of the first Wikipedians in Poland. In 1995, he founded the first Polish-language electronic mailing list on law, known as "prawo@plearn.bitnet". Two years later, he started his private Internet service VaGla.pl Prawo i Internet, dedicated to the legal aspects of the information society

Waglowski was a founding member of the Internet Society Poland. From 2001 to 2006, he was a member of the board of the Society. He has authored numerous articles on the legal aspects of the information society. In 2005 he has published book "Prawo w sieci. Zarys regulacji internetu", which was one of the first publications on this subject in Poland. Since December 2006 he has served in the Program Council of the bi-monthly magazine Elektroniczna administracja (Electronic administration). He is a member of the Program Council of the quarterly Prawo Nowych Technologii, and a columnist for the monthly magazine IT w administracji.

Together with Jarosław Lipszyc he initiated the celebration of the Public Domain Day in Poland, which has been celebrated for the first time in 2007.

On 14 August 2006, Deputy Prime Minister Ludwik Dorn appointed Waglowski for the member of the Informatization Council. On 23 March 2007 he was nominated for membership in the Council of Polish Chamber of Information Technology and Telecommunication.

Since 2009 he has served as a member of the Program Council of the Panoptykon Foundation From March 2012 until February 2013 he worked with Fundacja ePaństwo as Policy Director.

== Awards and prizes ==
- 2001: Internet Citizen of the Year 2001 - Piotr Waglowski has been the first to receive this title from the Organisational Committee of the Civil Internet for the essential contribution to the building the information society in Poland.
- 2005: Bronze Cross of Merit in 2005 from the President of Poland the cross "for the contribution to the development of informatization".
- 2010: Info Star Prize 2010 received from the Centre of the Promotion of the Computer Science and Polish Information Processing Society for "promotion of the ICT law".
- 2011: (nomination) Man of the Year. Internet Standard 2011 - "for almost 15 years of writing blog-portal on law and Internet, for consequent support of the freedom in The Net, for describing in easy-to-understand form difficult legal subjects, for initiating substantive discussions, for the contribution to the research on copyright law in Internet."
- 2012:

Accessible Cyberspace Forum awarded Waglowski a prize "for exceptional contribution to the accessibility of Internet"
- nominated to Andrzej Woyciechowski Prize

- 2013:

- nominated to Radio TOK FM Prize
- ranked Most Influential Polish Lawyer of 2012
- received MediaTory Prize (2013) from journalism students at Polish universities) for "ReformaTOR", the highest-standard of citizenship investigation, consequent monitoring (watchdoging) authorities and controlling legal reality for the benefit of whole society.
