= List of Soviet films of 1988 =

Title	Russian title	Director	Cast	Genre	Notes
1988
The Adventures of Quentin Durward, Marksman of the Royal Guard	Приключения Квентина Дорварда, стрелка королевской гвардии	Sergey Tarasov	Olga Kabo	Adventure	
Aelita, Do Not Pester Men!	Аэлита, не приставай к мужчинам	Georgy Natanson	Natalya Gundareva, Valentin Gaft	Comedy	
All Costs Paid	За всё заплачено	Aleksei Saltykov	Olegar Fedoro, Alim Kouliev	Drama	
Ashik Kerib	Ашик-Кериб	Dodo Abashidze, Sergei Parajanov	Yuri Mgoyan, Sofiko Chiaureli, Ramaz Chkhikvadze, Konstantin Stepankov	Drama	
Assa	Асса	Sergei Solovyov	Tatyana Drubich, Stanislav Govorukhin, Viktor Tsoi, Sergei "Afrika" Bugaev	Crime	
The Black Monk	Чёрный монах	Ivan Dykhovichny	Stanislav Lyubshin, Tatyana Drubich	Drama	
A Bright Personality	Светлая личность	Aleksandr Pavlovskiy	Nikolai Karachentsov, Aleksandra Yakovleva, Victor Pavlov	Comedy	
The Cat Who Walked by Herself	Кошка, которая гуляла сама по себе	Ideya Garanina	Valentina Ponomaryova	Animation	
The Cold Summer of 1953	Холодное лето пятьдесят третьего...	Aleksandr Proshkin	Valeriy Priyomykhov, Anatoli Papanov, Viktor Stepanov, Nina Usatova	Crime	
Criminal talent	Криминальный талант	Sergey Ashkenazi	Aleksei Zharkov, Alexandra Zakharova	Crime	
Curse of Snakes Valley	Заклятие долины змей	Marek Piestrak	Valeriy Priyomykhov, Anatoli Papanov, Viktor Stepanov, Nina Usatova	Adventure	
Days of Eclipse	Дни затмения	Aleksandr Sokurov	Aleksei Ananishnov	Science fiction	
Dear Yelena Sergeevna	Дорогая Елена Сергеевна	Eldar Ryazanov	Marina Neyolova	Drama	
Defence Counsel Sedov	Защитник Седов	Yevgeny Tsymbal	Vladimir Ilyin, Albina Matveyeva	Drama	
Fast Train	Скорый поезд	Boris Yashin	Elena Mayorova	Drama	
Gardes-Marines, ahead!	Гардемарины, вперёд!	Svetlana Druzhinina	Dmitry Kharatyan, Sergey Zhigunov, Vladimir Shevelkov, Mikhail Boyarsky	Adventure	
Heart of a Dog	Собачье сердце	Vladimir Bortko	Yevgeny Yevstigneyev, Boris Plotnikov, Vladimir Tolokonnikov, Nina Ruslanova	Science fiction	
Island of Rusty General	Остров ржавого генерала	Valentin Khovenko	Katya Prizhilyak, Alexander Lenkov	Science fiction	
The Jester	Шут	Andrei Andreyevich Eshpai	Dmitri Vesensky, Marina Mayevskaya	Drama	
Kerosene Salesman's Wife	Жена керосинщика	Alexander Kaidanovsky	Vytautas Paukste, Aleksandr Baluev	Drama	
Kings of Crime	Воры в законе	Yuri Kara	Anna Samokhina, Valentin Gaft	Crime	
The Lady with the parrot	Дама с попугаем	Andrei Prachenko	Aleksei Zharkov, Svetlana Smirnova	Comedy, romance	
A Little Doll	Куколка	Isaak Fridberg	Svetlana Zasypkina, Irina Metlitskaya	Drama	
Little Vera	Ма́ленькая Ве́ра	Vasili Pichul	Natalya Negoda, Andrei Sokolov, Yuriy Nazarov, Lyudmila Zaytseva	Drama, romance	
Mister Designer	Господин оформитель	Oleg Teptsov	Viktor Avilov, Anna Demyanenko, Mikhail Kozakov	Horror	
Moscow Elegy	Московская элегия	Alexander Sokurov		Documentary	
The Needle	Игла	Rashid Nugmanov	Viktor Tsoi, Marina Smirnova, Pyotr Mamonov	Thriller	
New Adventures of a Yankee in King Arthur's Court	Новые приключения янки при дворе короля Артура	Viktor Gres	Sergey Koltakov, Albert Filozov, Aleksandr Kaidanovsky	Fantasy	
Presumption of Innocence	Презумпция невиновности	Yevgeny Tatarsky	Lyubov Polishchuk, Stanislav Sadalskiy	Comedy	
The Prisoner of Château d'If	Узник замка Иф	Georgi Yungvald-Khilkevich	Viktor Avilov, Evgeniy Dvorzhetskiy, Alexei Petrenko, Anna Samokhina, Mikhail Boyarsky	Drama	
A Step	Шаг	Aleksandr Mitta	Leonid Filatov, Komaki Kurihara	Drama	
Tragedy, Rock Style	Трагедия в стиле рок	Savva Kulish	Aleksei Shkatov, Olga Alyoshina	Drama	
Treasure Island	Остров сокровищ	David Cherkasski	Valery Chiglyayev	Animation	
Tree Sticks!	Ёлки-палки!	Sergey Nikonenko	Sergey Nikonenko, Ekaterina Voronina, Galina Polskikh	Comedy	
Where is the Nophelet?	Где находится нофелет?	Gerald Bezhanov	Vladimir Menshov, Aleksandr Pankratov-Chyorny	Romantic comedy	
Whirlwind	Смерч	Bako Sadykov	Vladimir Msryan	Action	Screened at the 1989 Cannes Film Festival
Whose Are You, Old People?	Вы чьё, старичьё?	Iosif Kheifits	Mikhail Pakhomenko, Lev Borisov	Drama	
