= Eshpai =

Eshpai is a surname. It may refer to:

- Andrei Yakovlevich Eshpai (1925–2015), Russian and Soviet composer of Mari descent
- Andrei Andreyevich Eshpai (born 1956), Russian and Soviet film director, screenwriter and producer of Mari descent
- Yakov Eshpai (1890–1963), Russian composer and music teacher
