= Yevgeniya Simonova =

Soviet and Russian actress

- Евгения Симонова
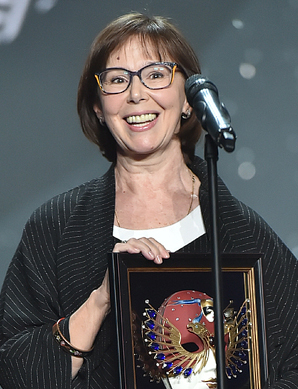
- Simonova at the Golden Mask 2017
- Born: Yevgeniya Pavlovna Simonova; 1 June 1955 (age 70); Leningrad, Russian SFSR, Soviet Union
- Citizenship: Soviet Union; Russia
- Occupation: Actress
- Years active: 1973–present
- Spouse(s): Alexander Kaidanovsky (23 July 1946 – 3 December 1995) (deceased); Andrei Andreyevich Eshpai (b. 18 April 1956)
- Website: http://epsimonova.narod.ru/

Yevgeniya Pavlovna Simonova (Russian: Евге́ния Па́вловна Си́монова, born 1 June 1955) is a Soviet and Russian theatre and film actress best known for her parts in films Afonya (1975), An Ordinary Miracle (1978), Twenty Six Days from the Life of Dostoyevsky (1981). In 1984 she received the State Prize for her contribution to several early 1980s Mayakovsky Theatre productions, including the Life of Klim Samgin (after Maxim Gorky's novel).

== Selected filmography ==
- Ten Winters During One Summer (Десять зим за одно лето, 1969) as Katya
- Only "Old Men" Are Going Into Battle (В бой идут одни старики, 1973) as Masha
- Flight Is Postponed (Вылет задерживается, 1974) as Elena Shemetova
- Afonya (Афоня, 1975) as Katya Snegireva
- The Lost Expedition (Пропавшая экспедиция, 1975) as Tasya Smelkova
- Golden River (Золотая речка, 1976) as Tasya Smelkova
- An Ordinary Miracle (Обыкновенное чудо, 1978) as Princess
- School Waltz (Школьный вальс, 1978) as Dina Solovyova
- Rafferty (Рафферти, 1980) as Jill Hart
- Story of an Unknown Man (1980) as Zinaida Fyodorovna
- Twenty Six Days from the Life of Dostoyevsky (Двадцать шесть дней из жизни Достоевского, 1981) as Anna Dostoyevskaya
- The Raw Youth (Подросток) (1983) as Alphonsine
- Quarantine (Карантин) (1983) as mother
- Russian Ragtime (Русский регтайм, 1993) as Masha
- Others (Иные, 2024), as Professor Lyubov Vladimirovna
