= Malyavin =

Malyavin (masculine, Russian: Малявин) or Malyavina (feminine, Russian: Малявина) is a Russian surname. Notable people with the surname include:

- Anastasiya Malyavina (born 1997), Ukrainian swimmer
- Filipp Malyavin (1869–1940), Russian painter and draftsman
- Valentina Malyavina (1941–2021), Soviet–Russian actress
- Vladimir Malyavin (born 1973), Russian long jumper
