= Anna Samokhina =

Russian actress (1963–2010)

- Born: Anna Vladlenovna Podgornaya; 14 January 1963; Guryevsk, Kemerovo Oblast, Soviet Union
- Died: 8 February 2010 (aged 47); Saint Petersburg, Russia
- Resting place: Smolensky Cemetery, Saint Petersburg
- Occupation: Actress
- Years active: 1982–2010

Anna Vladlenovna Samokhina (Russian: Анна Владленовна Самохина; 14 January 1963 – 8 February 2010) was a Russian actress. Samokhina started her film career in the 1980s and quickly became popular due to her talent, beauty and charm. She is best known as the leading actress in Yuri Kara's Barons of Crime (rus. Воры в законе), a most outlandish, brutal and controversial Soviet film, about mafia and corruption in the late USSR.

== Personal Life and Career ==
At the end of the 1990s, Samokhina stopped working in cinema, focusing primarily on her private life and restaurant business. In 2008, she returned to cinema and participated in several pictures.

The actress was married twice. From her first marriage, she had a daughter, Alexandra, who later became an actress too.

== Illness and Death ==
In November 2009, Anna Samokhina was diagnosed with stomach cancer at a late stage. Until 1 February 2010, Russian press and many actors in country did not know that her illness was very serious. She died on 8 February 2010 in a hospital in Saint Petersburg.

== Selected filmography ==
- 1988: The Prisoner of Château d'If (Russian: Узник замка Иф) as Mercedes
- 1988: Barons of Crime (Russian: Воры в законе) as Rita
- 1989: Don César de Bazan (Russian: Дон Сезар де Базан) as Maritana
- 1990: Frenzied Bus (Russian: Взбесившийся автобус) as Tamara Fotaki
- 1992: Detonator (Russian: Детонатор) as She
- 1993: Angelica's Passion (Russian: Страсти по Анжелике) as Angelica Kudrina
- 1994: The Wheel of Love (Russian: Колесо любви) as Ekaterina L'vovna
- 1996: Train to Brooklyn (Russian: Поезд до Бруклина) as Vera
- 1999: Chinese Tea-Set (Russian: Китайский сервиз) as Zinaida Voloshina
- 1999: Streets of Broken Lights (Russian: Улицы разбитых фонарей) as Larisa
- 2010: In the Style of Jazz (Russian: …в стиле JAZZ) as wife of Viktor Ivanovich
