= A Noisy Household =

- Russian: Беспокойное хозяйство
- Directed by: Mikhail Zharov
- Written by: Leonid Tur; Pyotr Tur
- Starring: Lyudmila Tselikovskaya; Aleksandr Grave; Mikhail Zharov; Vitali Doronin; Yury Lyubimov
- Cinematography: Valentin Pavlov
- Edited by: G. Slavatinskaya
- Music by: Yury Milyutin
- Production company: Mosfilm
- Release date: 1946
- Running time: 84 min.
- Country: Soviet Union
- Language: Russian

A Noisy Household, (Russian: Беспокойное хозяйство, romanized: Bespokoynoe khozyaystvo) is a 1946 Soviet comedy film directed by Mikhail Zharov.

== Plot ==
The film is set during the Great Patriotic War and follows Red Army soldier Ogurtsov (Aleksandr Grave) as he travels to his new assignment. On the way, he encounters Tonya (Lyudmila Tselikovskaya), a strict and determined corporal, and they discover they are both headed to the same post—a decoy airfield commanded by the eccentric warrant officer Semibab (Mikhail Zharov). Initially unaware of the site's true purpose, the newcomers are puzzled by Semibab’s odd orders to light up the airfield and run around with lanterns during enemy air raids, which turn out to be a strategy to mislead German bombers into attacking the fake airfield instead of the real one.

Meanwhile, German forces suspect the decoy airfield is a critical Red Army installation and send an experienced spy disguised as a wounded soldier to gather intelligence. Soviet command, in turn, deploys two fighter squadrons, including the French Normandie-Niemen unit, to protect the nearby area. Tonya, under Semibab’s guidance, uncovers the German spy and cleverly feeds him false information, ensuring the enemy continues to waste resources attacking the decoy. Romantic tensions arise as both Ogurtsov and two pilots—one French and one Soviet—compete for Tonya's attention, unaware of her secret mission to deceive the enemy.

As Ogurtsov grapples with jealousy, he comes up with an inventive plan to make the fake planes on the airfield appear mobile, adding realism to the deception. Despite technical challenges, the plan succeeds, further confounding the Germans. During an enemy raid, Ogurtsov's quick thinking nearly costs him his life, but his efforts contribute to the ongoing success of the ruse. The film blends humor, romance, and wartime ingenuity in a lighthearted tale of unconventional heroism.

== Cast ==
- Lyudmila Tselikovskaya as Antonina Kalmykova
- Aleksandr Grave as Tikhon Ogurtsov
- Mikhail Zharov as Semibab
- Vitali Doronin as Ivan Kroshkin
- Yuri Lyubimov as Jacques Larochelle
- Vladimir Balashov as Durand
- Georgy Svetlani as Sorokonozhkin
- Vladimir Uralskiy as Gvozdaryov
- Sergey Filippov as Krauss
- Mikhail Pugovkin as Soldier Pugovkin (uncredited)
