= Boys (1990 film) =

- Russian: Мальчики
- Directed by: Yuri Grigoryev; Renata Grigoryeva
- Written by: Fyodor Dostoevsky; Renita Grigoryeva
- Starring: Dmitriy Chernigovskiy; Olga Gobzeva; Anastasiya Ivanova; Evgeniy Tashkov; Lyudmila Zaytseva
- Release date: 1990
- Country: Soviet Union
- Language: Russian

Boys (Russian: Мальчики) is a 1990 Soviet drama film directed by Yuri Grigoryev and Renata Grigoryeva. The film is based on the tenth book of the same name, part four of Fyodor Dostoevsky's novel "The Brothers Karamazov".

== Plot ==
Monk Alyosha Karamazov tries to protect the boy from classmates and finds himself involved in the history of the life of the family of a person who does everything possible to maintain honor and dignity, despite the difficult situation.

== Cast ==
- Dmitriy Chernigovskiy
- Olga Gobzeva
- Anastasiya Ivanova
- Evgeniy Tashkov
- Lyudmila Zaytseva
