= Gotlib Roninson =

Soviet actor (1916–1991)

- Готлиб Ронинсон
- Roninson in 1967
- Born: 12 February 1916; Vilnius, Russian Empire
- Died: 25 December 1991 (aged 75); Moscow, Russian SFSR, Soviet Union
- Occupation: Actor
- Years active: 1953-1991
- Parent: Tatiana Gotlibovna Roninson (1894–1963)
- Awards: People's Artist of the RSFSR (1989)

Gotlib Mikhailovich Roninson (Russian: Готлиб Михайлович Ронинсон; 12 February 1916 — 25 December 1991) was a Soviet actor. He appeared in more than thirty films from 1953 to 1991.

== Filmography ==
Year	Title	Role	Notes
1953	Admiral Ushakov	Turkish man	
1953	Attack from the Sea	Orfano's henchman	
1966	Beware of the Car	Senior Insurer	
1968	Zigzag of Success	Lidiya Sergeyevna's husband	
1968	A Literature Lesson	Igor Raimondovich	
1969	Mystery-Bouffe		Voice
1971	The Flight	Greek voluptuous	
1971	The Twelve Chairs	Kislyarsky	
1972	Grandads-Robbers	doctor	
1972	The Dawns Here Are Quiet	Ofitser SS	Uncredited
1973	Land, on Demand	Tram Ticket Inspector Carlos Forelli	
1974	Paradise Apples	Police Captain	
1974	Countermeasure	Accountant Semyon Soykin	
1975	Afonya	astronomer in a robe	
1975	It Can't Be!	Ivan Izrailevich	
1975	The Irony of Fate	passenger from Krasnoyarsk	
1976	A Slave of Love	Ivan Figel	
1978	The Cure for Fear	store manager	
1979	Yeralash	Physics teacher	episode Where Are the Firewoods
1981	Say a Word for the Poor Hussar	Mark Yulievuch Movzon, actor	TV movie
1982	Resident Return	Pommere	
1990	My Husband Is An Alien	dentist patient	
1991	Tanks go on Taganka	old doctor	(final film role)
