= King Stag =

1969 film by Pavel Arsenov

- Directed by: Pavel Arsenov
- Written by: Vadim Korostylyov
- Starring: Yury Yakovlev; Valentina Malyavina; Sergey Yursky
- Cinematography: Inna Zarafyan
- Edited by: Olga Katusheva
- Music by: Mikael Tariverdiev
- Production company: Gorky Film Studio
- Release date: 1969
- Running time: 77 minutes
- Country: Soviet Union
- Language: Russian

King Stag (Russian: Король-олень, romanized: Korol-olen) is a feature film directed by Pavel Arsenov based on the musical play of the same name by Carlo Gozzi, and shot at the Gorky Film Studio in 1969. In the film, songs are played to the music of Mikael Tariverdiev performed by Alla Pugacheva, Yury Yakovlev, Sergei Yursky, Oleg Yefremov, Oleg Tabakov. It was a classic of children's cinema in the Soviet Union.

== Plot ==
Deramo, kind but simple-hearted king of Serendippe, wishes to marry. There is a problem: how to find out which of the contenders for his loves is genuine and which is simply eyeing the royal throne. The wizard Durandarte gives the king a figure of a clown who laughs if someone utters an untruth. The clown appears similar to the favorite of the king, the crafty and mean first minister Tartaglia, who for a long time and unrequitedly was in love with Angela, the daughter of the second minister, Pantalone, a timid bureaucrat. But Angela loves Deramo, though she will not be his bride, considering marriage unnecessary and humiliating. Tartaglia hatches intrigues and in every possible way interferes with his daughter Clarice marrying young, handsome chamberlain Leandra, Angela's brother, expecting to give the hand of his daughter to the king. Despite all the tricks of the first minister, the king, by the audacity and sharpness of Angela, manages to discern her true love for him, falls in love with her and declares her his wife. Tartaglia is, however, unrelenting: while hunting, he learns from a friend the spell of Durandarte and swaps bodies with him.

== Cast ==
- Yury Yakovlev as Deramo
- Valentina Malyavina as Angela (vocals Alla Pugacheva)
- Sergey Yursky as Tartaglia
- Vladimir Shlesinger as Pantalone
- Oleg Tabakov as Chigolotti
- Oleg Yefremov as Durandarte
- Elena Solovey as Clarice
- Viktor Zozulin as Leander
- Vladimir Grammatikov as Zanni
- Alla Budnitskaya as Serendipist girl

== Songs ==
- Durandarte's Cavatina
- Angela's Cavatina
- Duet of Angela and Pantalone
- Song of the Serendipist girls
- Duet of Deramo and Angela
- Tartaglia's Aria
- Reply from Durandarte
- Ballad of Angela
- The duo Clarice and Leander
- A Song About Evil and Good Wizards
- Chigolotti's Cavatina
- Song of the Guards
