= Nina Maslova =

Soviet and Russian actress

- Born: Nina Konstantinovna Maslova; 27 November 1946 (age 79); Riga, Latvian SSR, Soviet Union
- Occupation: Actress
- Years active: 1967–present

Nina Konstantinovna Maslova (Russian: Ни́на Константи́новна Ма́слова; born 27 November 1946) is a Soviet and Russian actress.

She is best known for her roles in "Big School-Break", "Ivan Vasilievich: Back to the Future" and "Afonya". She is a Merited Artist of the Russian Federation (2006).

== Filmography ==
- 1972–1973 Big School-Break (TV miniseries) as Viktoria Korovyanskaya
- 1973 Ivan Vasilievich: Back to the Future as Tsaritsa Marfa Vasilyevna
- 1975 Afonya as Yelena
- 1976 To Save the City as Masha
- 1985 Dangerous for Your Life! as lady with the Dog
- 1990 Aferisty as accountant
- 1991 Depression as Lyuda
- 2003 Bless the Woman as doctor
