= Zina-Zinulya =

- Russian: Зина-Зинуля
- Directed by: Pavel Chukhray
- Written by: Alexander Gelman
- Starring: Yevgeniya Glushenko; Viktor Pavlov; Vladimir Gostyukhin; Aleksandr Zbruev; Tatyana Agafonova
- Cinematography: Nikolay Nemolyaev
- Music by: Mark Minkov
- Production company: Mosfilm
- Release date: 3 November 1986
- Running time: 88 min.
- Country: Soviet Union
- Language: Russian

Zina-Zinulya (Russian: Зина-Зинуля) is a 1986 Soviet drama film directed by Pavel Chukhray. The film tells about a girl who is faced with fraud and trying to confront him.

== Plot ==
The story takes place at a concrete plant, where Zina, a dispatcher known as one of the best employees, tries to enforce order, combatting false reporting and sloppy work. She files reports against careless drivers, and one of them, in an attempt at revenge, deliberately delivers a load of concrete to a dump instead of the location specified by Zina. The concrete hardens, and the driver then complains to the manager, falsely accusing Zina of misdirecting the delivery. As a result, the manager suspends her from work.

In protest, Zina sits on a tree stump near the dump where the ruined concrete was left, declaring that she will not leave until the driver admits his deception and apologizes. The next day, the construction manager arrives and tries to persuade Zina to go home, but she stands firm and repeats her demands. Soon, her friends join her in support.

== Cast ==
- Yevgeniya Glushenko as Zinaida Koptyaeva
- Viktor Pavlov as Petrenko
- Vladimir Gostyukhin as Viktor Nikolaevich
- Aleksandr Zbruev as Fedor Ivanovich Kuzmin
- Tatyana Agafonova as Valya Nikitina
- Elena Mayorova as Nina
- Svetlana Tormakhova as Klava
- Evgeniy Shutov as Sergey Sergeevich
- Nina Agapova as secretary
- Valentina Ananina as dorm janitor
