= Viktor Rakov =

Viktor Rakov PAR
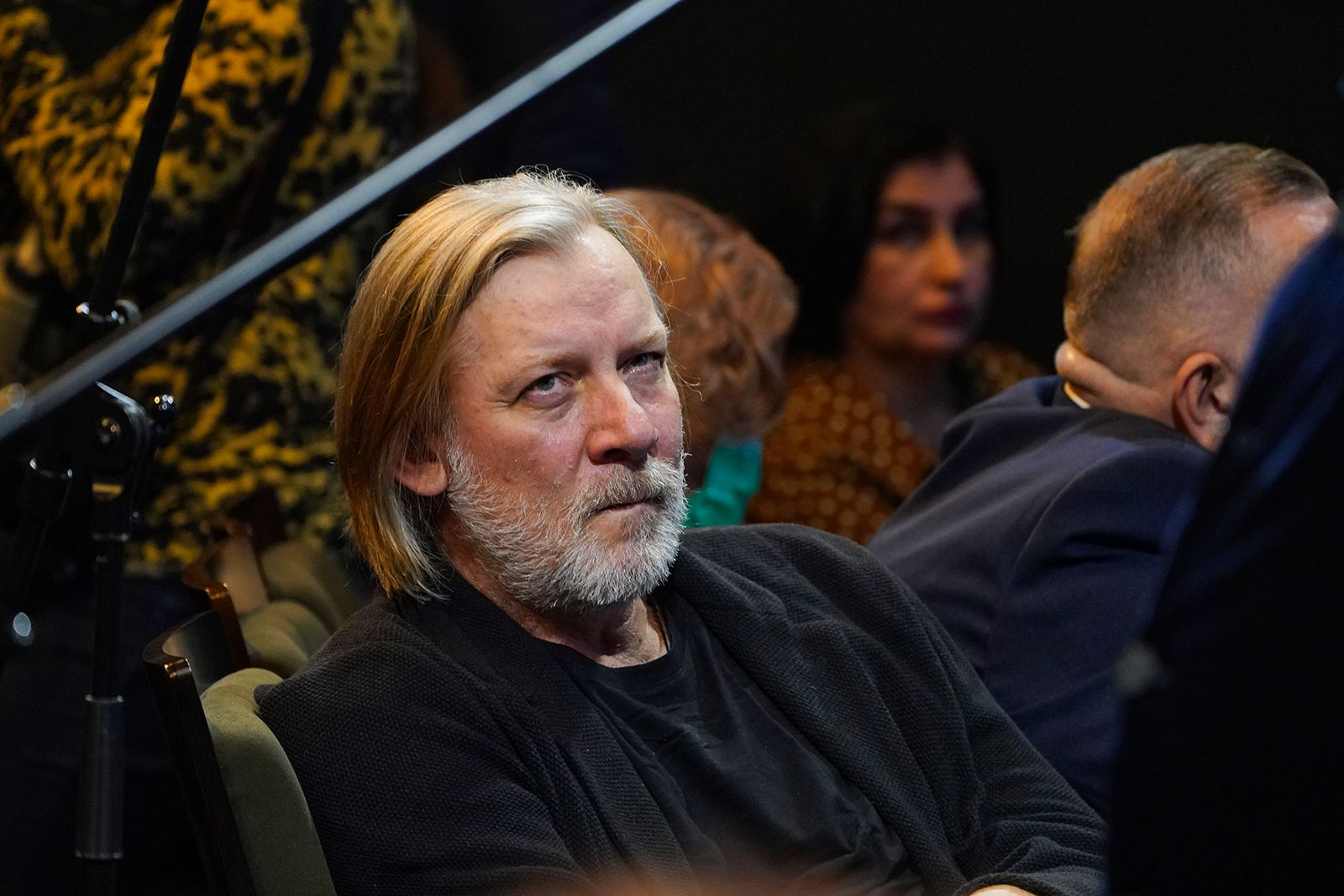
- 2022
- Born: Viktor Viktorovich Rakov; 5 February 1962 (age 64); Moscow, RSFSR, USSR
- Education: Russian Academy of Theatre Arts

Viktor Viktorovich Rakov (Russian: Виктор Викторович Раков; born February 5, 1962) is a Soviet and Russian film and theater actor. People's Artist of Russia (2003).

== Biography ==
He was born February 5, 1962, in Moscow and after graduating in 1984 from GITIS he became an actor in the Lenkom Theatre.

His first major role was in To Kill a Dragon as Heinrich, the Burgermeister's son.

He has a son from his first marriage with Olga Ilyukhina and is married to Lyudmila Rakova, with whom he had two children.

== Works ==
=== Theatre ===
- Sage as Glumov
- The Star and Death of Joaquin Muretta as Joaquin Muretta, Lead and customs officer, organ grinder
- Hamlet as Laertes
- Juno and Avos as Fernando Lopez, man of the theater, Burning heretic, Count Rezanov
- The Royal Game as Thomas Cromwell
- Jester Balakirev as Menshikov
- Va-Bank as Dulchin
- Marriage as Podkolyosin
- Peer Gynt as Davorsky grandfather, King of Trolls
- White lie as Senor Balboa, grandfather (director by Gleb Panfilov)
- Skywalker as Ryabovsky

=== Selected filmography ===
- 1988 — To Kill a Dragon as Heinrich, Burgermeister's son
- 1990 — Mother as Pavel Vlasov
- 1990 — Humiliated and Insulted as Alyosha Valkovsky
- 1992 — Gardes-Marines III as Baron von Brockdorf
- 1994 — The Master and Margarita as the Master
- 2000 — The Romanovs: An Imperial Family as Tsar Nicholas II (voice)
- 2006 — Alive as philosopher
- 2009 — The Admiral as investigator Popov
- 2013 — The Three Musketeers as Mr. Bonacieux
- 2014 — House with Lilies as Miron Polischuk
- 2015 — Catherine the Great as Count Alexei Razumovsky

== Prizes and awards ==
- Honored Artist of the Russian Federation (1996) - for achievements in the arts
- People's Artist of Russia (2003)
- Order of Friendship (2013)
