= Desyat Negrityat =

Desyat Negrityat Ten Little Negroes
- Film poster for Desyat Negrityat
- Directed by: Stanislav Govorukhin
- Screenplay by: Stanislav Govorukhin
- Based on: And Then There Were None by Agatha Christie
- Starring: Vladimir Zeldin; Tatyana Drubich; Alexander Kaidanovsky; Aleksei Zharkov; Anatoli Romashin; Lyudmila Maksakova
- Cinematography: Gennadi Engstrem
- Edited by: Valentina Olejnik
- Music by: Nikolai Korndorf
- Production company: Odessa Film Studio
- Release date: December 28, 1987
- Running time: 137 min
- Country: Soviet Union
- Language: Russian

Desyat Negrityat (Russian: Десять негритят, 'Ten Little Indians') is a 1987 Soviet mystery thriller film adaptation of Agatha Christie's 1939 novel of the same name, now known as And Then There Were None. It was directed by Stanislav Govorukhin, who also penned the script.

This version was unique in that virtually no part of the novel was altered (although a sexual relationship between Vera and Lombard is introduced, and the latter's revolver is changed into a small automatic pistol). Unlike the previous Hollywood/British adaptations of the story, none of the characters or their respective crimes are altered in any way and the film concludes with the grim finale from Agatha Christie's original novel, rather than the upbeat ending from the 1943 stage version that most other adaptations chose to follow. The Soviet adaptation is a bit more fanciful in that the murderer expounds at some length, in solitude, about their methodology and the critical twist (aloud instead of on paper as in the novel).

== Plot ==
On a hot, early August day sometime in the late 1930s, eight people arrive on a small, isolated island off the Devon coast of England. Each appears to have an invitation tailored to his or her personal circumstances, such as an offer of employment or an unexpected late summer holiday. They are met by Thomas and Ethel Rogers, the butler and cook/housekeeper, who state that their hosts, Mr Ulick Norman Owen and his wife Mrs Una Nancy Owen, whom they have not yet met in person, have not arrived, but left instructions, which strikes all the guests as odd.

== Cast ==
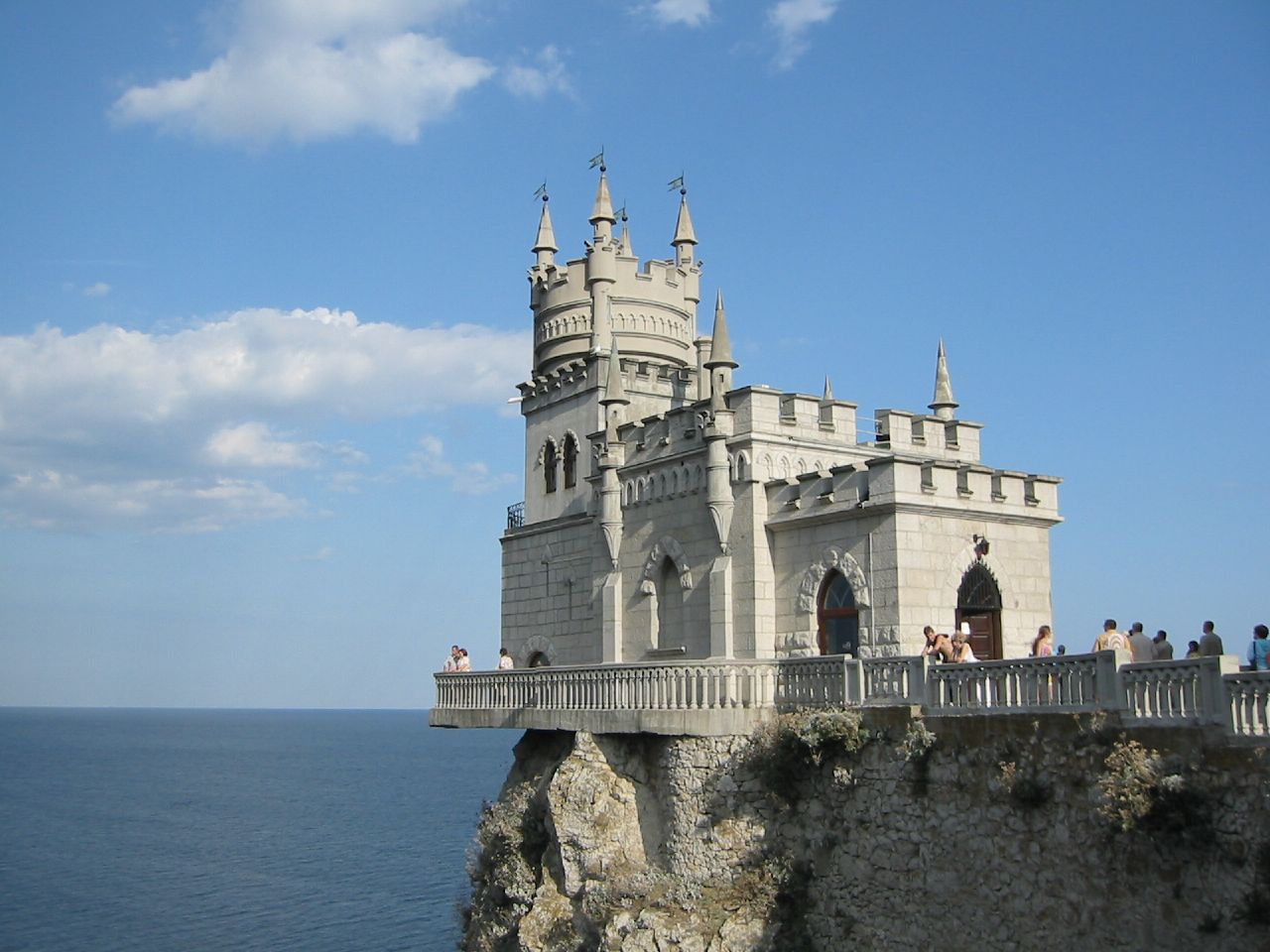
The Swallow's Nest

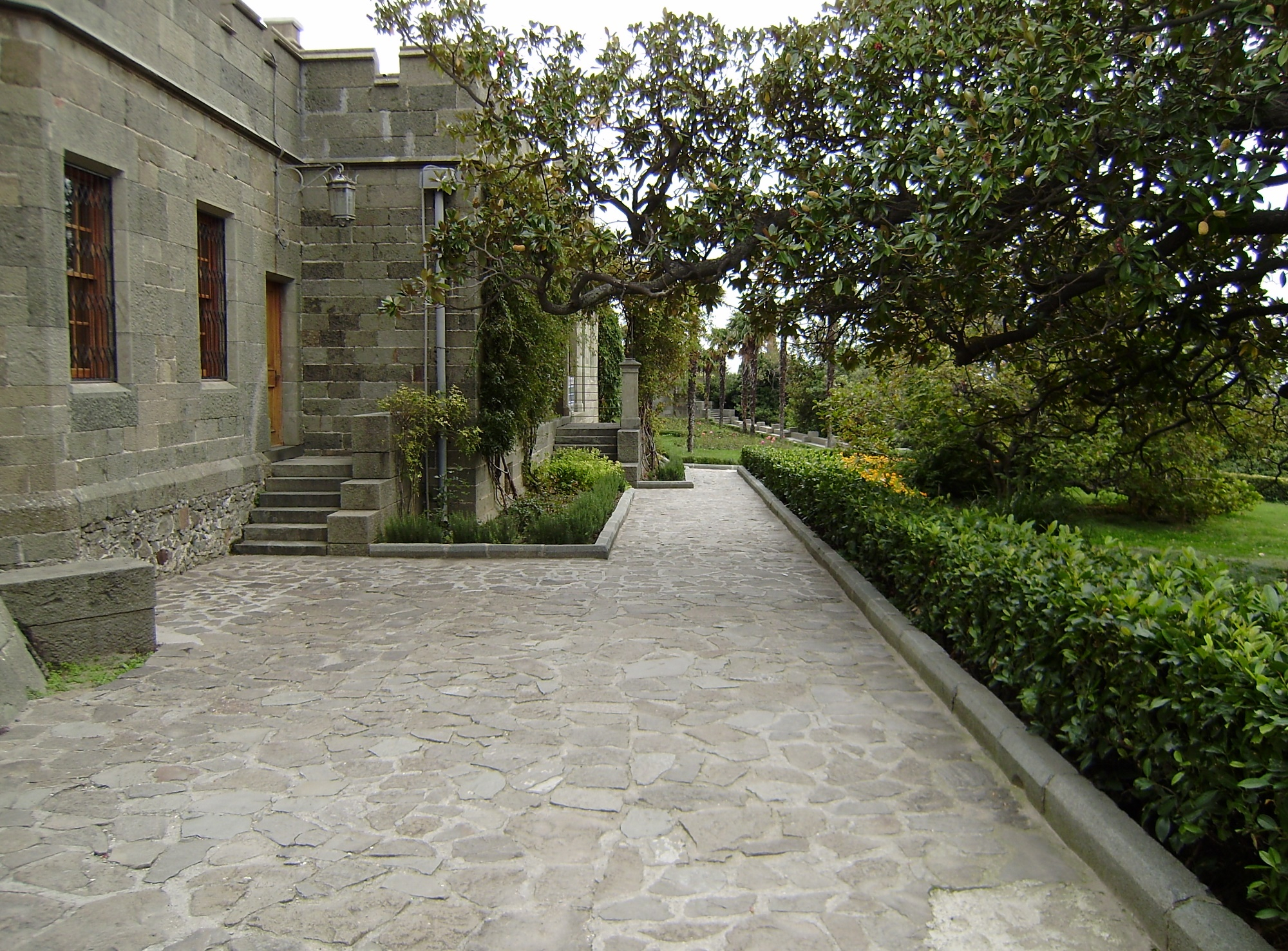
Vorontsovsky Palace

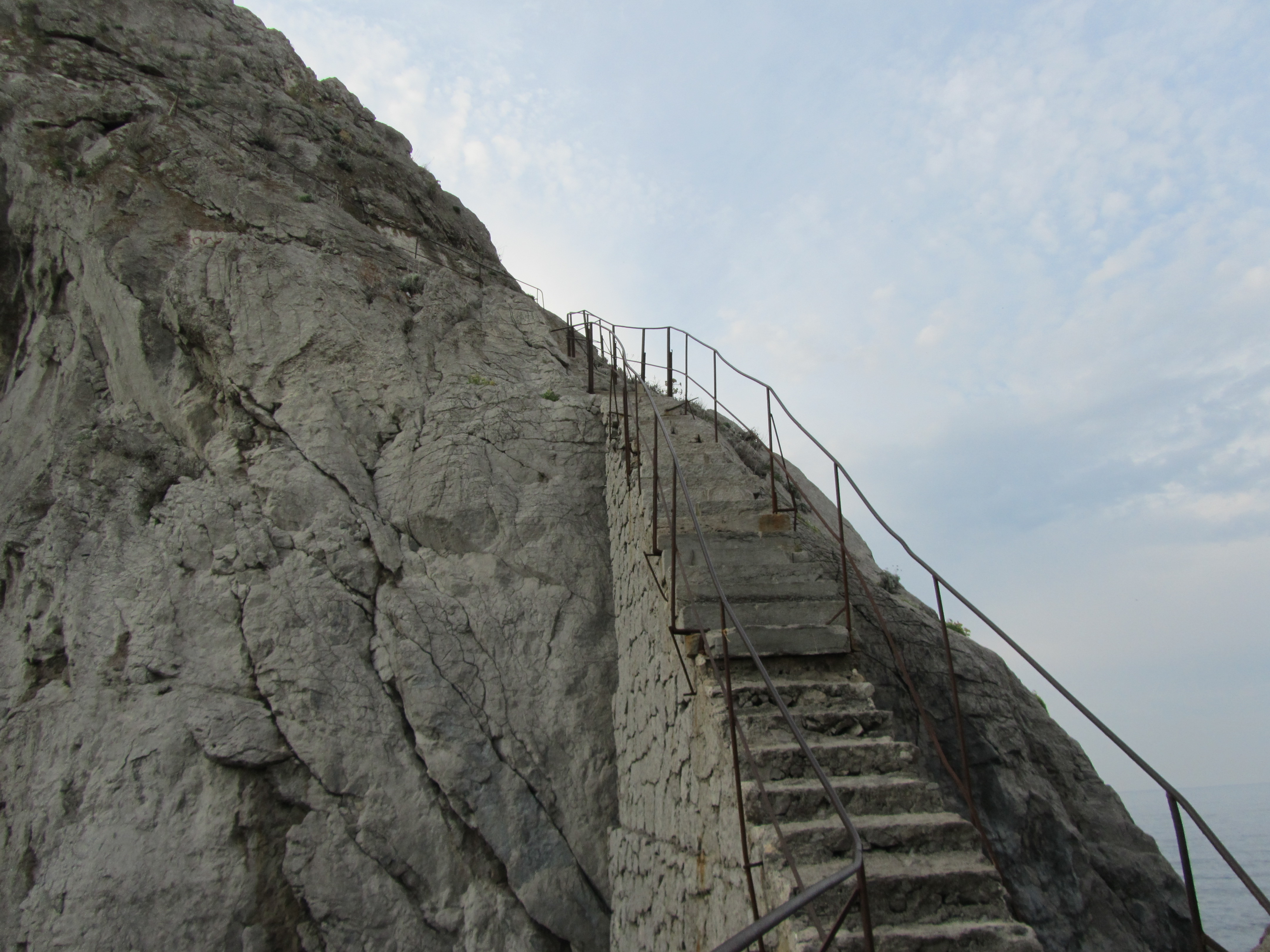
Steps of Diva Rock

- Vladimir Zeldin as Judge Lawrence Wargrave
- Tatyana Drubich as Vera Claythorne
- Alexander Kaidanovsky as Philip Lombard
- Aleksei Zharkov as Detective William Blore
- Anatoli Romashin as Doctor Armstrong
- Lyudmila Maksakova as Emily Brent
- Mikhail Gluzsky as General MacArthur
- Aleksei Zolotnitsky as Mr. Rogers
- Irina Tereshchenko as Mrs. Rogers
- Aleksandr Abdulov as Anthony Marston
- Igor Yasulovich as Accuser's voice on a phonograph record

== Locations ==
The film was shot in Crimea, utilizing the peninsula's two famous mansions, the Swallow's Nest and the Vorontsov Palace. However, when the house is seen on a cliff in the exterior scenes, it is actually a scale model, shot with actors using forced perspective. The stone staircase leading up to the house was filmed at Diva Rock.

== Reviews ==
Croatian film critic Hrvoje Milaković described Desyat Negrityat as "the first and — until 2015 — the only true adaptation" of the novel, noting the screenwriting and directing work of Govorukhin, "who demonstrated not only a masterful knowledge of the entire text of Agatha Christie, but also a deep understanding of it, which was not found either before or after," as well as "outstanding acting work and solid technical embodiment".
