= Story of an Unknown Man =

1980 drama film

- Directed by: Vytautas Žalakevičius
- Screenplay by: Vytautas Žalakevičius
- Starring: Yevgeniya Simonova; Alexander Kaidanovsky; Georgy Taratorkin; Lyudmila Zaytseva
- Cinematography: Anatoliy Kuznetsov
- Edited by: Zoya Veryovkina
- Music by: Georgy Firtich
- Release date: 1980
- Language: Russian

Story of an Unknown Man (Russian: Рассказ неизвестного человека, romanized: Rasskaz neizvestnogo cheloveka) is a 1980 Russian drama film written and directed by Vytautas Žalakevičius. It was entered into the main competition at the 37th Venice International Film Festival.

== Cast ==
- Yevgeniya Simonova as Zinaida Fyodorovna
- Alexander Kaidanovsky as Stepan
- Georgy Taratorkin as Orlov Zhorzh
- Lyudmila Zaytseva as Polina
- Pavel Kadochnikov as Graf Orlov
- Sergey Muchenikov as Kukushkin
- Boris Romanov as Gruzhin
- Ion Ungureanu as Pekarskiy
- Gleb Plaksin

== Production ==
The film is an adaptation of the Anton Chekhov's novella The Story of an Unknown Man.

== Release ==
The film entered the main competition at the 37th edition of the Venice Film Festival.

== Reception ==
A contemporary Variety review called the film as "bit skimpy in narrative format but [...] lovingly though academically made." Continental Film Review's Peter Cargin noted "the director uses the interiors of the house very well, not 'opening out' the film artificially but moving his players naturally in the settings". Giovanni Grazzini from Corriere della Sera described it as "a film of classical realism, with beautiful melancholic nuances, steeped in melancholy, and guided step by step toward the evocation of a distant world that is no less painful than today's."
