= Red Square (film) =

- Russian poster
- Russian: Красная площадь
- Directed by: Vasili Ordynsky
- Written by: Yuli Dunsky; Valeri Frid
- Produced by: Mark Shadur
- Starring: Sergey Yakovlev; Aleksandr Kutepov; Vyacheslav Shalevich; Stanislav Lyubshin; Valentina Malyavina; Sergey Nikonenko
- Cinematography: Valentin Zheleznyakov
- Edited by: Lyudmila Butuzova
- Music by: Venyamin Basner
- Color process: Black and white
- Production company: Mosfilm
- Release date: 1970
- Running time: 138 minutes
- Country: Soviet Union
- Language: Russian

Red Square (Russian: Красная площадь, romanized: Krasnaya ploshchad) is a 1970 Soviet war drama film directed by Vasili Ordynsky.

The film consists of two parts. The first part tells about the commissar Dmitry Amelin, who goes to the grenadier full to convince the soldiers to join the Red Army. In the second part Amelin becomes the commissioner of the division, led by former Tsarist officer Kutasov, who plans to organize an imitation of the blow of one unit, which will distract the White Guards.

== Plot ==
=== First Story: "Commissar Amelin" ===
In 1918, Dmitry Amelin, a commissar of the All-Russian Collegium tasked with forming the Red Army, is sent to the 38th Grenadier Regiment, which has abandoned its position. His mission is to persuade the soldiers to join the Red Army. With difficulty, Amelin overcomes the soldiers' hostility and finds common ground with an anarchist agitator, sailor Volodya Koltsov. With the help of Lieutenant Nikolai Kutasov, a skilled officer, he manages to transform the regiment into a battle-ready unit capable of resisting German forces. On February 23, 1918, near Petrograd, the regiment faces off against a superior enemy force and emerges victorious. During the battle, Kutasov teaches Amelin the basics of military tactics. A friendship forms between Amelin, Kutasov, and Kutasov's wife, Natasha.

After the battle, the regiment joins the Red Army in full—except for Kutasov, who, while not opposed to Soviet power, foresees a brutal civil war and refuses to take part. Later, in Moscow's Red Square, he watches newly formed Red Army units take their oath in the presence of Lenin. Deeply moved, Kutasov reconsiders his decision.

=== Second Story: "Division Commander Kutasov" ===
In 1919, Amelin is appointed commissar to a division commanded by Kutasov, who is now a Red Army officer. A major offensive is being prepared, with Kutasov's division assigned a critical role. Lacking sufficient forces for a direct assault, Kutasov devises a feint: a small but reliable unit, bolstered by an armored train, will simulate an attack to divert the White forces' attention, allowing the division’s main forces to strike elsewhere. The battalion designated for this diversion includes many soldiers from the former 38th Regiment, known to both Amelin and Kutasov from 1918. Koltsov, now commanding the armored train, has temporarily set aside his anarchist beliefs for the mission.

An ethical conflict arises: Kutasov, a professional soldier, unhesitatingly sends familiar comrades to almost certain death to save the lives of many others. While Amelin understands the rationale, he can justify it only by joining the doomed battalion himself. Kutasov reflects, "You've proven you're better than me... you'll go and give your life. My job is to give away others' lives. Do you think that's easier?"

Natasha Kutasova, upon learning of the operation, severs her relationship with her husband.

Kutasov’s plan succeeds, with minimal losses to the division. Amelin is the only survivor of the decoy force; gravely concussed, he is carried to safety by his comrades.

In the film's epilogue, Colonel General Kutasov visits Red Square, where Amelin's ashes are interred in the Kremlin Wall. The date of Amelin’s death is recorded as August 2, 1941.

== Cast ==
- Vyacheslav Shalevich as Nikolay Kutasov
- Stanislav Lyubshin as Dmitry Amelin
- Valentina Malyavina as Natasha Kutasova
- Sergey Nikonenko as Volodya Koltsov
- Uno Loyt as Uno Parts
- Pavel Kormunin as machine gunner Karpushonok
- Viktor Shulgin as Kamyshov
- Alexander Kaidanovsky as Kashchei
- Nikolai Karachentsov as episode
- Aleksei Smirnov as Soldier of the 38th Grenadier Regiment
- Sergey Yakovlev as Lenin
- Aleksandr Kutepov as Yakov Sverdlov
- Roman Khomyatov as Army Commander
- Nikolay Parfyonov as Army Political Section Chief
