= Humiliated and Insulted (film) =

- Russian: Униженные и оскорблённые
- Directed by: Andrei Eshpai
- Written by: Fyodor Dostoevsky; Aleksandr Volodin
- Produced by: Mikhail Litvak; Ibrahim Moussa; Vladimir Zheleznikov
- Starring: Nastassja Kinski; Nikita Mikhalkov; Anastasiya Vyazemskaya; Sergey Perelygin; Viktor Rakov
- Cinematography: Aleksandr Kazarenskov; Sergey Yurizditsky
- Edited by: Pierluigi Leonardi
- Music by: Andrey Eshpay; Paul W. Mason
- Production companies: Gorky Film Studio; Layla Films; Globe Film Studio
- Release date: 1990
- Running time: 106 min.
- Countries: Soviet Union; Switzerland; Italy
- Language: Russian

Humiliated and Insulted (Russian: Униженные и оскорблённые, romanized: Unizhennye i oskorblennye) is a 1990 Soviet romantic drama film directed by Andrei Eshpai. The film tells about two families ravaged by the aristocrat Prince Valkovsky. The film shows the relationship of Natasha Ikhmeneva and son of Valkovsky, tells about the fate of the young writer Ivan Petrovich, in love with Natasha, as well as an orphan, Nellie.

== Plot ==
Set in Saint Petersburg, the film follows the life of Ivan Petrovich (Vanya), a young writer and the adopted son of the Ichmenyev family. Vanya witnesses the struggles of Natasha Ichmenyeva, who is in love with Alyosha Valkovsky, the son of her father's enemy. Natasha's father, Nikolai Ichmenyev, was once employed by Prince Valkovsky, but a dispute led to Valkovsky accusing Ichmenyev of embezzlement, forcing him to pay a large sum and leaving his family in poverty. Despite Alyosha's affection for Natasha, he is also courting Katya, the wealthy daughter of a merchant, under pressure from his father, who seeks a large dowry. Natasha, aware of Alyosha’s divided loyalties, leaves her family to live with him, deepening her father’s resentment and leading him to disown her. Ivan, secretly in love with Natasha, supports her through these trials.

Meanwhile, Ivan encounters Nelly, a twelve-year-old orphan suffering abuse from her guardian, Madame Bubnova. With the help of his detective friend Masloboev, Ivan rescues Nelly, who reveals her tragic past and failing health. She becomes a comforting presence in his life. As Natasha begins to see through Prince Valkovsky’s manipulative intentions, Ivan learns the prince’s dark history, including his betrayal of another young woman, which mirrors his treatment of Natasha. Despite Valkovsky’s efforts to separate Natasha and Alyosha, Natasha’s heartbreak deepens as Alyosha appears increasingly drawn to Katya. In the end, with Nelly’s help, Ivan reconciles Natasha with her father, though Nelly dies shortly afterward. In her final moments, she leaves a message for Prince Valkovsky, condemning him and conveying that his daughter, whom he abandoned, died without forgiving him.

== Cast ==
- Nastassja Kinski as Natasha (voiced by Anna Kamenkova)
- Nikita Mikhalkov as Prince Valkovsky
- Anastasiya Vyazemskaya as Nellie
- Sergey Perelygin as Ivan Petrovich
- Viktor Rakov as Alyosha
- Aleksandr Abdulov as Masloboev
- Boris Romanov as Nikolay Ikhmenev
- Lyudmila Polyakova as Anna Ikhmeneva
- Varvara Shabalina as Anna Trifonovna Bubnova
- Valentina Klyagina as Mavra
- Heinz Brown as doctor

== See also ==
- Humiliated and Insulted
