= Vyacheslav Shalevich =

Vyacheslav Shalevich PAR
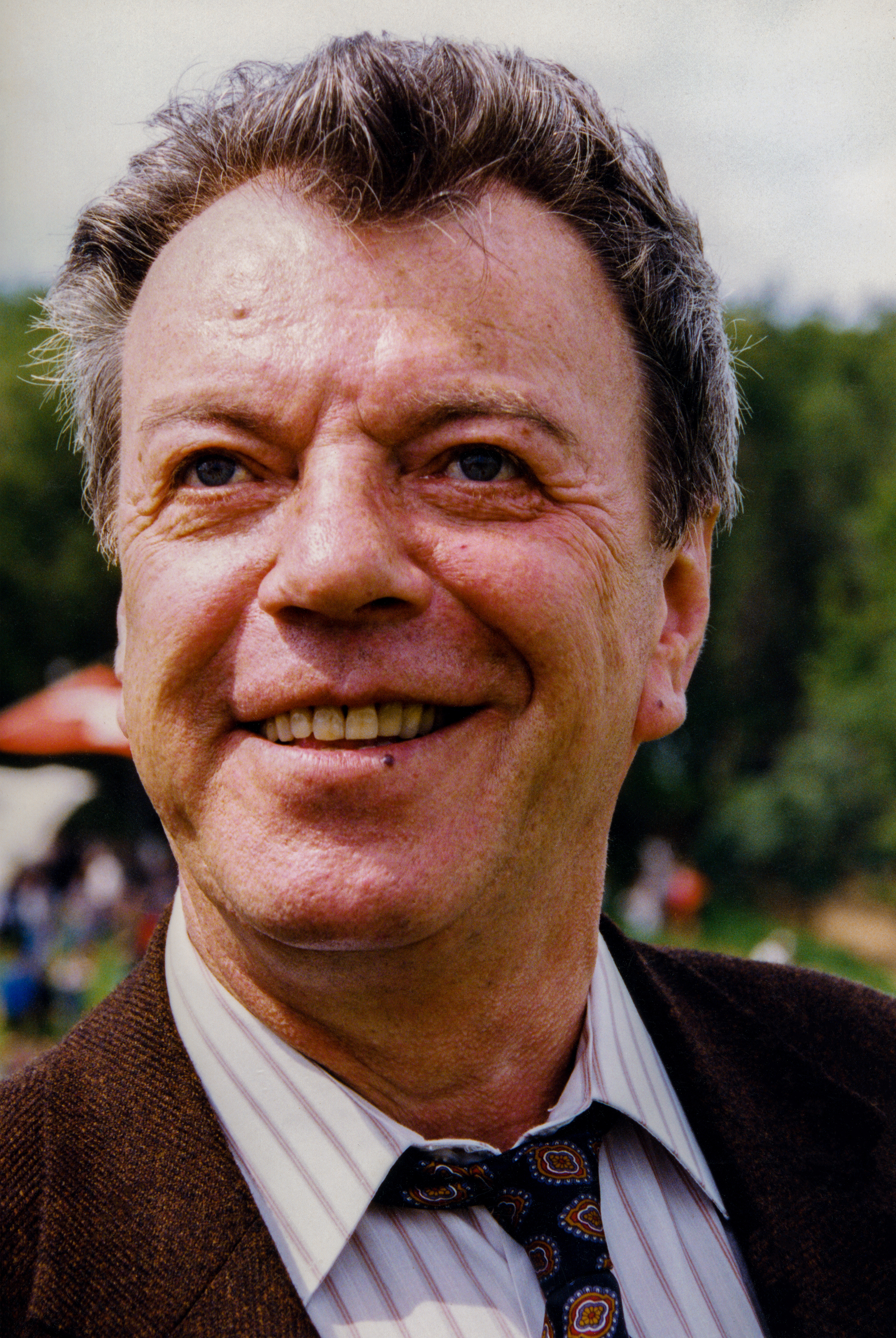
- Born: Vyacheslav Anatolievich Shalevich; 27 May 1934; Moscow, RSFSR, USSR
- Died: 21 December 2016 (aged 82); Moscow, Russia
- Education: Boris Shchukin Theatre Institute
- Occupation: Actor
- Years active: 1958–2016
- Title: People’s Artist of the RSFSR (1979)
- Awards: Order "For Merit to the Fatherland" (4th class); Order of Honour; Order of Friendship of Peoples; State Prize of the Russian Federation

Vyacheslav Anatolievich Shalevich (Russian: Вячесла́в Анато́льевич Шале́вич; 27 May 1934 – 21 December 2016) was a Soviet-Russian film, theatre actor and a People's Artist of the RSFSR.

== Biography ==
Vyacheslav Anatolievich Shalevich was born in Moscow in 1934. His father, Anatoly Shalevich, defected to the Red Army and rose to the rank of General of the NKVD. Vyacheslav believed his father had died in the Finnish war. Vyacheslav Anatolievich Shalevich spent his childhood with his mother, Elena.

In 1958 he graduated from the Boris Shchukin Theatre Institute. After graduation he was accepted into the troupe of the Vakhtangov State Academic Theatre. Vyacheslav Shalevich was one of the few actors who played in two films with the same name, but are not remakes, Red Square.

== Selected filmography ==
- 1958: The Captain's Daughter (Капитанская дочка) as Shvabrin
- 1961: Barrier of the Unknown (Барьер неизвестности) as Baykalov
- 1963: Now Let Him Go (Теперь пусть уходит) as Stan Beeston
- 1967: Three Poplars in Plyushcikha (Три тополя на Плющихе) as Grisha
- 1968: Virineya (Виринея) as Ivan Pavlovich
- 1968: The Picture of Dorian Gray (Портрет Дориана Грея) as Alan
- 1968: The Sixth of July (Шестое июля) as Yakov Blumkin
- 1970: Red Square (Красная площадь) as Kutasov
- 1970: My Street (Моя улица) as Semyon Semyonovich
- 1971: The City Under Lindens (Город под липами) as Boris Popov
- 1973: Seventeen Moments of Spring (Семнадцать мгновений весны) as Allen Dulles
- 1976: Carlos Espinola Diary (Дневник Карлоса Эспинолы) as school principal
- 1978: The Cure Against Fear (Лекарство против страха) as Panafidin
- 1980: Code Name Is 'South Thunder' (Кодовое название «Южный гром») as General Beryozov
- 1994: The Master and Margarita (Мастер и Маргарита) as Caiaphas
- 1999: It's Not Recommended To Offending Women (Женщин обижать не рекомендуется) as Admiral
- 2004: Red Square (Красная площадь) as Aleksandr Rekunkov (Soviet Union Attorney General in 1981–1988)
- 2004: Moscow Saga (Московская сага) as General

== Honors ==
- Honored Artist of the RSFSR (1971)
- People's Artist of the RSFSR (1979)
- State Prize of the Russian Federation in the field of literature and art in 1994 (29 May 1995)
- Order of Friendship of Peoples (6 May 1994) - for his great contribution in the field of theatrical art
- Winner of the Government of Moscow (1996)
- Order of Honour(1 November 2001) - for many years of fruitful activity in the field of culture and art, a great contribution to strengthening friendship and cooperation between the nations
- Order "For Merit to the Fatherland", 4th class (27 May 2004) - for his great contribution in the development of theatrical art '.
