= The White Crow (1980 film) =

- Russian poster
- Russian: Белый ворон
- Directed by: Valeriy Lonskoy
- Written by: Valeri Lonskoy; Vladimir Zheleznikov
- Starring: Vladimir Gostyukhin; Irina Dymchenko; Aleksandr Mikhaylov; Irina Akulova; Lev Borisov
- Cinematography: Vladimir Papyan
- Edited by: Irma Tsekavaya
- Music by: Isaac Schwarts
- Production company: Mosfilm
- Release date: 1980
- Running time: 99 minutes
- Country: Soviet Union
- Language: Russian

The White Crow (Russian: Белый ворон) is a 1980 Soviet romantic drama film directed by Valeriy Lonskoy.

The film tells the story of miner Yegor who goes on holiday to the south where he meets the married Sonya.

== Plot ==
Egor, a miner from Donetsk, heads to Gelendzhik for a vacation, eager to meet people and make an impression, just like everyone else at the resort. His blunt, straightforward nature, however, isn’t well received by all, and he ends up tied to a pole on the beach overnight as a prank. He is rescued by Sonya, a fellow vacationer, who captures his heart so completely that he spends every remaining day with her. Despite learning that Sonya is married, Egor is undeterred by her resistance to his advances, but eventually, she returns home to her husband.

Sonya’s husband has changed significantly over time, now more concerned with his career and financial status than his relationship with her. Feeling unhappy, Sonya’s struggles linger, and Egor, restless and smitten, decides to visit her at home unannounced. His arrival surprises Sonya, especially as he shows up on her husband’s birthday, where his straightforward demeanor makes him a stark contrast to her husband’s refined guests. Openly dismissed by the company, Egor refuses to give up, pursuing Sonya persistently, even attempting to whisk her away in an old Zaporozhets that breaks down mid-escape.

As Egor’s determination wears down her defenses, Sonya begins to question her feelings, seeking space at a friend’s to reflect. Her husband, however, tracks them down, and with the help of his friends, ambushes Egor, beating him and tossing him into a pit. When Sonya finds Egor injured, she realizes that she truly loves him, yet she cannot abandon her husband, feeling that he would be lost without her. In the end, she chooses not the man she loves most, but the one she pities most.

== Cast ==
- Vladimir Gostyukhin
- Irina Dymchenko
- Aleksandr Mikhaylov
- Irina Akulova
- Lev Borisov
- Boris Shcherbakov
- Vladimir Zemlyanikin
- Viktor Filippov
- Roman Khomyatov
- Lyubov Polishchuk
