= Vladimir Gostyukhin =

Soviet/Russian film and stage actor

- Владимир Гостюхин
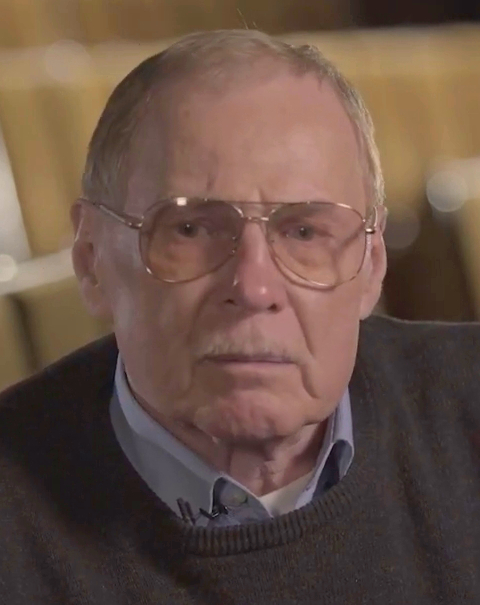
- Gostyukhin in 2017
- Born: 10 March 1946 (age 80); Sverdlovsk, Russian SFSR, Soviet Union
- Citizenship: Soviet Union (formerly); Russia; Belarus
- Occupation: Actor
- Years active: 1970—present

Vladimir Vasilyevich Gostyukhin (Russian: Владимир Васильевич Гостюхин, Belarusian: Уладзімір Васільевіч Гасцюхін, born 10 March 1946) is a Soviet and Russian, Belarusian film and stage actor.

== Selected filmography ==
=== Actor ===
- 1977: The Ascent as Rybak
- 1980: The White Crow
- 1980: Fox Hunting as Belov
- 1983: Magistral (Russian: Магистраль) as Boichuk
- 1983: Moon Rainbow as David Norton
- 1986: Zina-Zinulya as Viktor Nikolaevich
- 1986: In Search for Captain Grant as Major McNabbs
- 1987: Moonzund as Semenchuk
- 1989: Abduction of the Wizard as Akiplesha
- 1991: Close to Eden as Sergey
- 1992: The General as Alexander Gorbatov
- 2002: War as Ivan's father
- 2013: Ottepel as Pronin
- 2016: Santa Claus. Battle of the Magi as Vitaly Semyonovich

=== Director ===
- 1997: Botanichesky Sad

== Political views ==
One of the founders of the Belarusian Republican Party of Labour and Justice.
