= And in the Morning They Woke Up =

- Russian: А поутру они проснулись
- Directed by: Sergey Nikonenko
- Written by: Yuriy Berdnikov; Sergey Nikonenko; Vasiliy Shukshin
- Starring: Aleksandr Abdulov; Sergey Garmash; Igor Bochkin; Sergey Nikonenko; Vasiliy Mishchenko
- Release date: 2003
- Country: Russia
- Language: Russian

And in the Morning They Woke Up (Russian: А поутру они проснулись) is a 2003 Russian comedy-drama film directed by Sergey Nikonenko.

== Plot ==
In the center of the plot are eight completely different people, each of whom wakes up in a sobering room and tries to remember how he ended up there.

== Cast ==
- Aleksandr Abdulov
- Sergey Garmash
- Igor Bochkin
- Sergey Nikonenko
- Vasiliy Mishchenko
- Evgeniy Stychkin
- Vladimir Bolshov
- Igor Khristenko
- Boris Shcherbakov
- Eduard Martsevich
