= Afonya =

1975 film directed by Georgiy Daneliya

- Film poster
- Directed by: Georgiy Daneliya
- Written by: Alexander Borodyanski
- Produced by: Aleksandr Yablochkin
- Starring: Leonid Kuravlyov; Yevgeny Leonov; Yevgeniya Simonova
- Cinematography: Sergei Vronsky
- Edited by: Tatyana Egorycheva
- Music by: Mieczysław Weinberg
- Production company: Mosfilm
- Release date: 13 October 1975
- Running time: 92 min.
- Country: Soviet Union
- Language: Russian
- Box office: $21.3 million

Afonya (Russian: Афоня) is a Soviet romantic comedy-drama film produced by Mosfilm and first released in 1975. The film became the Soviet box office leader of 1975 with a total of 62.2 million ticket sales. The film was shot in Yaroslavl.

== Background ==
To understand why Afonya's frolicking were put up with, one has to know that in the Soviet Union, apparently lowly, underpaid and hence unpopular occupations of plumbers and loaders (in stores), were in fact relatively lucrative ones due to high demand in their indispensable services, and their low pay was more than compensated by bribes taken for by them simply to do their job properly.

== Plot summary ==
Afanasy "Afonya" Borshchov (Leonid Kuravlev) and his friend Fedulov (Borislav Brondukov) are plumbers. All day long they are avoiding work and looking for opportunities to drink. Afanasy takes "kickbacks" from customers. Afanasy also often uses foreign or old-fashioned names to introduce himself to strangers to seem more interesting.

Afanasy meets plasterer Kolya (Yevgeny Leonov) in a pub, gets drunk and comes home. When his girlfriend sees the state he's in, she leaves him. The next morning he can't even remember yesterday's drinking companion.

At a dance Afanasy meets young nurse Katya Snegireva (Yevgeniya Simonova), who knows about him through her brother, who used to play in Afanasy's volleyball team. Afanasy doesn't pay her much attention, because he's more interested in older women and already has his eye on one at the dance. However, a romantic walk with the older woman after the dance is over before it begins – Afanasy is challenged to a fight by a hooligan, who he'd quarreled with at the dance. The hooligan's friends join in, and finish the unequal fight. Katya worries for Afanasy's safety, and calls the police- which will only bring Afanasy to the committee's attention again.

At a regular service call Borshchov meets Elena (Nina Maslova) and falls in love at first sight. He starts finding any excuse to work in her flat - even fooling a tenant, astronomer (Gotlib Roninson), by swapping his new Finnish sink for an old one, so he can install the Finnish sink in Elena's home as a gift. In his dreams Afanasy sees a family idyll with his wife Elena and their perfect children.

Katya Snegireva, head over heels for Afanasy, keeps engineering new meetings with him, and stops at nothing to attract his attention ("'Afanasy!' - someone called, I thought it was you..."), but Afonya is oblivious to her feelings.

Meanwhile Afanasy’s run in with the police catches up with him and, for persistent drunkenness, truancy and fighting Afanasy is threatened with being sacked. In addition, if he doesn't restore the Finnish sink he's definitely going to be fired. Afanasy takes a porcelain sink with flowers to Elena to swap with the Finnish sink, but meets Elena coming home with company. She makes her feelings quite clear: she has her own life among fashionable and wealthy men, and Afanasy is just a plumber.

Afanasy, depressed, goes to a restaurant with Fedulov and tries to escape into drunkenness, but it doesn't help. In his drunken state he goes to Katya Snegireva's home and proposes marriage, and wakes up next to her in the morning. Katya tells him she's due to move to Africa with work and wonders if she should cancel for Afanasy.

Afanasy then decides to go back to his village, to his aunt Frosya (Raisa Kurkina), a simple and modest woman who had brought him up. In the village, he meets his childhood friend Fidget (Savely Kramarov) and, in a joyous moment sends the city a telegram resigning from his job and giving up his apartment. Only then does he learn that Aunt Frosya died two years ago. The village people had sent him a telegram, which he hadn't received because he had moved house and didn't tell them his new address. From his neighbor, Uncle Yegor (Nikolai Grinko) Afanasy learns that Frosya deeply missed him and even wrote letters to herself from his name, posting them in a nearby village, then receiving them and reading them to neighbors, who understood that she really wrote the letters herself, but didn't betray it so as not to hurt Frosya's feelings. Frosya had died sitting in front of the window, waiting for Afanasy.

Afanasy’s depression deepens – he has lost everything and has nowhere to go. He goes to the post office and tries to call Katya Snegireva on her memorable phone number 50-50-2, or as he says himself, "rug-rug or two." The answer comes back - Katya has left. Finally frustrated, he goes to the airport. He does not care where he's going or what will happen to him. Just when Afanasy is heading to the AN-2 aircraft, a familiar girlish voice calls out. It's Katya, suitcase in hand: "'Afanasy!' - someone called, I thought it was you... "

== Cast ==
- Leonid Kuravlev as Afanasy "Afonya" Borshchov
- Yevgeniya Simonova as Katya Snegireva
- Yevgeny Leonov as Kolya
- Savely Kramarov as Fidget
- Nina Maslova as Elena (Elena, Helene), Beauty of the 139th flats
- Borislav Brondukov as Fedulov
- Igor Bogolyubov as old Peregar
- Valentina Talyzina as Vostryakova
- Vladimir Basov as Vladimir Ivanovich
- Nikolay Parfyonov as Fomin, Boris Petrovich
- Gotlib Roninson as astronomer ("Archimedes")
- Raisa Kurkina as Aunt Frosya
- Nina Ruslanova as Tamara
- Nikolai Grabbe as the chief of housing offices
- Nikolai Grinko as Uncle Yegor
- Gennady Yalovich as the director in the theater
- Radner Muratov as Marat Rakhimov
- Tamara Sovchi as cashierdining
- Yusup Daniyal as cashier dining companion
- Mikhail Vaskov as the policeman at the airport
- Peter Lyubeshkin as Uncle Pavel Shevchenko
- Renee Hobua as not featured in the film, although there is in the credits
- Alexei Vanin as Ivan Orlov, Elena's husband
- Capitolina Ilienko as a participant in the meeting of housing the office
- Aleksandr Potapov as employee of housing offices
- Mikhail Svetin as the driver Voronkov
- Tatiana Rasputina as a dance partner Afonyia
- Alexander Novikov as a bully with a beard
