= The Feasts of Belshazzar, or a Night with Stalin =

- Directed by: Yuri Kara
- Written by: Fazil Iskander
- Starring: Aleksei Petrenko; Aleksandr Feklistov; Valentin Gaft; Yevgeniy Yevstigneyev
- Cinematography: Vadim Semyonovykh
- Music by: Edison Denisov
- Production company: Gorky Film Studio
- Release date: 1989
- Running time: 83 min.
- Country: Soviet Union
- Language: Russian

The Feasts of Belshazzar, or a Night with Stalin or (Russian: Пиры Валтасара, или Ночь со Сталиным, romanized: Piry Valtasara, ili noch so Stalinym) is a 1989 film adaptation of Fazil Iskander's eponymous novella directed by Yuri Kara. In the 1990s the film was screened in the United States, including at the United States Congress. The title is a reference to Belshazzar's feast, a chapter of the Book of Daniel.

== Plot ==
On 20 September 1906, a brazen robbery is committed on the passenger steamer "Tsesarevich Georgiy" near Sukhumi, Russian Empire. Several hirsute men threatening with weapons, break open a cashbox which is transporting a large amount of money and having captured several hostages land on shore. Then they mercilessly kill the hostages, who are praying for mercy, and disappear into the mountains. After some time the leader and his lieutenant shoot and kill the accomplices and then the lieutenant gets a lead cartridge through his head. The bloody leader remains alone with the loot but a shepherd boy named Sandro becomes an involuntary witness of his reprisal. The grim villain looks attentively at the frozen in terror teenager and... goes away by the mountainous road.

Years pass. Sandro grows up and becomes participant of an Abkhazian dance ensemble. One evening in 1935 by the order of chief party leader of Abkhazia, Nestor Lakoba, the entire ensemble is called to perform before Joseph Stalin. The great leader comes with his associates to Abkhazia to have a good rest. Stalin watches the dances with pleasure and listens to the songs of the peoples of the Caucasus, drinks a lot, and merrily makes fun of others. During the dance competition blindfolded Sandro manages to roll on his knees straight to the feet of Stalin. This delights Stalin, he praises the skillful dancer but suddenly becoming glum asks a strange question-statement: "Somewhere I have seen you ..." Sandro, pale with fear, finds a convincing excuse but then remembers! The same ruthless murderer whom Sandro met in his distant childhood was in fact, Joseph Stalin.

After the feast, people involved begin disappearing.

== Cast ==
- Aleksei Petrenko – Joseph Stalin
- Aleksandr Feklistov – Uncle Sandro
- Valentin Gaft – Lavrentiy Beria
- Larisa Belogurova – Nina Beria, Lavrentiy Beria's wife
- Yevgeniy Yevstigneyev – Mikhail Kalinin
- Sergei Nikonenko – Kliment Voroshilov
- Aleksei Safonov – Nestor Lakoba
- Tamara Yandieva – Saria Lakoba, Nestor Lakoba's wife
- Mikhail Kononov – sanatorium director
- Anatoly Guzenko – Platon Pantsulaya, the head of the dance ensemble
- Sergey Nikolaev – chef
