= Hello, Children! =

- Russian: Здравствуйте, дети!
- Directed by: Mark Donskoy
- Written by: Mark Donskoy
- Starring: Aleksei Zharkov; Pavel Chukhray; Eduard Izotov; Lyudmila Skopina
- Release date: 1962
- Running time: 88 minute
- Country: Soviet Union
- Language: Russian

Hello, Children! (Russian: Здравствуйте, дети!) is a 1962 Soviet children's drama film directed by Mark Donskoy.

Children from different parts of the world found themselves in a pioneer camp on the Black Sea coast. And suddenly a Japanese girl named Ineko fell ill and other children are doing everything possible to help her. The doctor promised her that she would recover if she made a thousand cranes out of paper.

== Plot ==
The film centers on Elena Ivanovna, the director of a pioneer camp, who organizes a meeting between current pioneers and the first international pioneer delegates who visited the camp many years ago. Bringing together pioneers from the past and present, she reminisces about how things used to be.

The pioneer camp hosts an international session, welcoming children from the Soviet Union, Germany, France, the United States, Japan, and other countries. Guided by Elena Ivanovna, the Soviet children act as wise and hospitable hosts, resisting various provocations. These include racial tensions between two American boys—one white and one Black—reflecting the racial inequalities of the era in the United States, as well as disagreements between French and German boys.

The international teaching staff agrees to avoid political propaganda, but this agreement is occasionally broken. For example, a Catholic priest plays a broadcast of a mass from St. Peter’s Basilica over the radio.

A Japanese girl named Ineko arrives at the camp. One day, she develops symptoms of radiation sickness, a tragic event that unites the pioneers. The children embark on a quest to find the legendary "herb of life" to help Ineko. They fold paper cranes for her, and a global medical council gathers at the camp to discuss treatment options. Both children and adults come together in a shared determination to prevent another tragedy like the atomic bombings of Hiroshima and Nagasaki.

== Cast ==
- Aleksei Zharkov
- Pavel Chukhray
- Eduard Izotov
- Lyudmila Skopina
