= Barons of Crime =

- Russian: Воры в законе
- Directed by: Yuri Kara
- Written by: Yuri Kara; Fazil Iskander
- Produced by: Nikolai Velmiskin
- Starring: Anna Samokhina; Valentin Gaft; Vladimir Steklov; Boris Shcherbakov; Arnis Līcītis
- Cinematography: Vadim Semyonovykh
- Edited by: Alla Myakotina
- Music by: Rodion Shchedrin
- Production company: Gorky Film Studio
- Release date: 1988
- Running time: 95 min.
- Country: Soviet Union
- Language: Russian

Barons of Crime (Russian: Воры в законе, romanized: Vory v zakone) is a 1988 Soviet crime thriller film directed by Yuri Kara based on the stories of Fazil Iskander.

The film tells about the confrontation between two leaders of criminal gangs from one coastal city.

== Plot ==
Set in Abkhazia in the early 1980s, the story follows Rita, a farmer’s daughter from a Caucasus village who runs away from home and falls in with a criminal gang controlling a small coastal town. She becomes the lover of Arthur, the mafia leader modeled after the real-life figure Hadzharat (Lakoba Y.V.), who has both local craftsmen and Soviet authorities under his control.

As the KGB begins investigating the gang's activities, Arthur is forced to part ways with Rita. Around this time, a young archaeologist named Andrey arrives in town, falls in love with Rita, and they marry. However, their hopes for a happy life together are ultimately doomed.

== Cast ==
- Anna Samokhina as Rita
- Valentin Gaft as Artur
- Vladimir Steklov as Volodya
- Boris Shcherbakov as Andrei
- Arnis Līcītis as Militia lieutenant (as Arnis Litsitis)
- Nurbey Kamkia as Rita's father
- Zinoviy Gerdt as Lawyer
- Gia Lejava as Ramzes (as Givi Lezhava)
- Amayak Akopyan as The Puppeteer
- Stanislav Korenev as prosecutor

== Reception ==
=== Box office ===
The film ranks 99th among domestic films in terms of attendance in the entire history of the Soviet film distribution with 39 million viewers.

=== Critical response ===
According to literary critic Natalia Ivanova, "Iskander's complex, ambiguous, genuinely artistic and socially caring thought was turned into a completely unambiguous action movie". In 1988, in the December issue of the Cinema Viewer's Companion, film critic Aleksei Erokhin stressed that director Yuri Kara had shot an up-to-date acute social action film about the Soviet mafia and corruption.

=== Awards and nominations ===
Nomination for the Nika Award in the Best Supporting Role category (Zinovy Gerdt).
