= Egorka =

- Russian: Егорка
- Directed by: Aleksandr Yanovsky
- Written by: Vsevolod Egorov; Pyotr Gavrilov
- Starring: Mikhail Pugovkin
- Cinematography: Mikhail Rogovoy
- Music by: Yevgeny Krylatov
- Production company: Gorky Film Studio
- Release date: December 23, 1984 (Soviet Union)
- Running time: 69 min.
- Country: Soviet Union
- Language: Russian

Egorka (Russian: Егорка) is a 1984 Soviet adventure film directed by Aleksandr Yanovsky.

== Plot ==
The sailors found a teddy bear and decided to call him Yegorka. He gives them trust and love, and in the end, the sailors let him go.

== Cast ==
- Mikhail Pugovkin as boatswain Toporshchuk
- Gennady Frolov as Nalyvayko
- Gennady Voronin as ship commander
- Aleksei Veselkin as sailor Shutkin
- Andrei Kostyakin as Sorokin
- Igor Zolotovitsky as Rybakov
- Aleksandr Baluev as border boat commander
- Igor Bochkin
- Sergey Bobrov
