= Igor Bochkin =

Russian actor

- Born: Igor Ivanovich Bochkin; 17 February 1957 (age 69); Moscow, Russian SFSR, Soviet Union
- Occupations: Actor, theatre director
- Years active: 1972–present
- Spouse: Anna Legchilova

Igor Ivanovich Bochkin (Russian: И́горь Ива́нович Бо́чкин; born February 17, 1957) is a Soviet and Russian theater, television and film actor, theater director. He has appeared in more than 50 films since 1972. He was named a People's Artist of the Russian Federation in 2005.

== Selected filmography ==
- 1984 – Egorka as signalman
- 1985 – Sincerely Yours... as museum guard
- 1990 – Frenzied Bus as Pavel Melkoyants
- 2001 – Yellow Dwarf as Mikhail Semyonov
- 2002 – Investigation Held by ZnaToKi as Kandelaki
- 2003 – And in the Morning They Woke Up as Sasha
- 2004 – Moscow Saga as Petukhov
