= Barrier of the Unknown =

1961 film

- Directed by: Nikita Kurikhin
- Written by: Dmitri Radovsky
- Starring: Vyacheslav Shalevich; Ella Sumskaya; Nikolai Gritsenko; Aleksandr Grave
- Cinematography: Samouil Rubashkin
- Music by: Mieczysław Weinberg
- Production company: Lenfilm
- Release date: 1961
- Running time: 108 minutes
- Country: Soviet Union
- Language: Russian

Barrier of the Unknown (Russian: Барьер неизвестности, romanized: Barier neizvestnosti) is a 1961 Soviet science fiction drama film directed by Nikita Kurikhin.

The film tells about the creators and testers of the Soviet piloted hypersonic airplane "Cyclone". In the USSR, there were many such programs which were left unfinished, but all the characteristics of the Cyclone (speed, altitude, etc., except for "radioactive combustion accelerators"), including flight characteristics (launch from a carrier aircraft) are exactly borrowed from the North American X-15.

== Plot ==
Far away in the Central Asian steppes a test site is hidden where new jet aircraft are being tested, including an experimental aircraft with a rocket engine on atomic radioactive accelerators, deployed from under the wing of a carrier aircraft and capable of making a suborbital crewed space flight - to reach a thermosphere altitude of 100 km, as well as speeds over 7,200 km / h.

The pilot-engineer Sergei Fyodorovich Baikalov and the research officer Vera Borisovna Stankevich are sent to this range. During the flight, the first tester of the "Cyclone" is Kazantsev. It is necessary to understand the cause of the disaster in order to prevent its recurrence. The situation is complicated by the fact that Kazantsev shortly before the disaster told about the glow he saw in the flight around the body of the plane, Vera Stankevich was called to investigate the mechanism. After the resumption of flights Baikalov does not see any glow on the second copy of the "Cyclone". But during the second flight, the glow appears again, more intense, and the accident happens this time with the second "Cyclone". But the Cyclone aircraft remains structurally whole and manageable, but although a radiation leak has started because of the accident. The pilot of the carrier plane rescues the Cyclone-2, knowing in advance that the leakage of radiation is possibly fatal to it.

== Cast ==
- Vyacheslav Shalevich — test pilot Sergei Fedorovich Baikalov
- Ella Sumskaya — physicist Vera Borisovna Stankevich
- Nikolai Gritsenko — Vadim Semenovich Lagin
- Aleksandr Grave — Fedor Vasilyevich Sokolov
- Vasily Makarov — test pilot Oleg Leonidovich Kazantsev
- Fyodor Nikitin — Doctor Romashov
- Valentina Kibardina — Marya Vasilyevna
- Vladimir Maksimov — Professor
- Sergei Plotnikov — test pilot Colonel Vavilov
- Vladimir Maryev — General
- Georgy Shtil — helicopter pilot
- T. Telnik — Anechka

== Technical aspects of the story line ==
In addition to the fact that many projects similar to American rocketplanes and orbital planes were conducted in the USSR, according to the reports of authoritative American publications such as Missiles and Rockets magazine, US military analysts reported the existence of the USSR's functional (non test-object) aerospace flying apparatus of a similar class, as indicated by a number of features. In the West, this hypothetical Soviet aircraft received the T-4A index.

== Production accident ==
During an interval in shooting, cinematographer's assistant Yuri Gakkel, who was the illegitimate son of Mikhail Kalatozov and the fiancé of actress Yevgenia Uralova, drowned.
