= Frenzied Bus =

- Soviet Union theatrical release poster
- Directed by: Georgy Natanson
- Written by: Nikolai Krivomazov; Georgy Natanson; David Markish
- Produced by: Victor Freilich; Victor Zolotarev
- Starring: Ivars Kalniņš; Igor Bochkin; Anna Samokhina
- Cinematography: Vadim Semenovykh
- Music by: Eugen Doga
- Production company: Gorky Film Studios
- Distributed by: Gorky Film Studios (Soviet Union)
- Release date: 26 April 1990
- Running time: 105 minutes
- Country: Soviet Union
- Language: Russian

Frenzied Bus (Russian: Взбесившийся автобус, romanized: Vzbesivshiysya avtobus) is a 1990 Soviet crime film. The story is based on real events that occurred on 1 December 1988, when there was a hijacking of a bus with children in Ordzhonikidze.

== Plot ==
The events of the film take place in 1988 in the city of Ordzhonikidze (now Vladikavkaz). Pavel Melkoyants (played by Igor Bochkin) and his accomplice Jafar hijack a passenger bus from the city's bus station. As they drive away, they come across a group of schoolchildren, who have just finished a field trip, and invite them onto the bus, taking them and their teacher hostage. The criminals are unaware that the hijacking is quickly reported over the police radio, though the authorities are not yet aware that children are involved. The hijacked bus is soon spotted by local KGB officers who overhear the radio transmission in their official car. The hijackers continue driving, and as they pass through a square in front of the local executive committee building, they open fire on a trailing "Volga" car, seriously wounding the driver.

The criminals pick up their accomplices—Sedoy (Sergey Maksachyov), Zhila (Amayak Akopyan), and Molchun (Kakha Dzadzamiya)—and continue their journey. Meanwhile, police and internal forces begin to seal off the area, while fire trucks and ambulances are dispatched. The terrorists demand a radio to communicate with Colonel Orlov (Ivar Kalnynsh), a KGB officer, and outline their demands. Tamara (Anna Samokhina), Pavel's wife, who is unaware of her husband's involvement in the crime, exits the bus and delivers the hijackers’ ultimatum to Orlov. She reveals the number of terrorists, the children and their teacher being held hostage, and the presence of weapons, explosives, and gasoline on the bus. The hijackers demand two million dollars, one million rubles in gold, and a flight to a country with no diplomatic relations with the USSR. The Soviet authorities agree to the terms, but the plane that can transport such a large vehicle is located in Mineralnye Vody, six hours away, requiring a convoy of military and emergency vehicles to escort the bus.

Along the way, the hijackers' plans shift. They decide to pick up an accomplice, Viktor (Alexander Vdovin), who is imprisoned. However, Viktor refuses to join them, and the criminals further deliberate on their flight destination. They consider Pakistan, but discard the idea due to a fear that they would be caught. They briefly entertain the idea of South Africa, but reject it because of racial prejudices, and Chile is also ruled out due to political instability. Eventually, they settle on Israel, a country with which the USSR has no diplomatic relations. The Soviet government attempts to offer an alternative destination—Finland—but the criminals reject it, insisting on Israel.

As the convoy reaches the airport, the hijackers' demands grow. They insist on rifles, bulletproof vests, and handcuffs for the crew, and they exchange the children for the flight crew and Colonel Orlov as hostages. However, a delay occurs when the teacher (Anna Tikhonova) is detained by Sedoy, who attempts to assault her. Orlov intervenes, and a violent confrontation ensues. Eventually, the criminals celebrate, while the flight crew and Orlov remain captive. The plane lands at Ben-Gurion Airport in Tel Aviv, where the hijackers hope for better treatment. They insist on staying at a luxurious hotel but are instead taken into custody. After negotiations, the Israeli authorities agree to extradite the criminals to the USSR, but only under the condition that none of the hijackers will face the death penalty. As the criminals are prepared for extradition, Melkoyants attempts to convert to Judaism in a desperate bid to avoid being sent back to the USSR. However, the authorities remain unmoved, and the hijackers are ultimately flown back to the Soviet Union, where they are captured by the KGB upon arrival in Moscow.

== Cast ==
- Ivars Kalniņš as Colonel Valentin Orlov (voiced by Sergei Malishevsky)
- Igor Bochkin as Pavel Melkoyants, terrorist ringleader
- Anna Samokhina as Tamara Fotaki, Pavel's wife
- Anna Tikhonova as teacher
- Amayak Akopyan as Zhila, terrorist
- Igor Kashintsev as Major General
- Emmanuil Vitorgan as Mr. Anouk, a member of the Israeli Foreign Ministry
- Boris Shcherbakov as Boris Vasilievich, a member of the USSR Foreign Ministry
- Alexander Kuznetsov as flight engineer
- Aristarkh Livanov as Viktor, Soviet Ambassador in Pakistan
- Pyotr Shcherbakov as pilot

== Filming ==
The first half of the film (including scenes of the taking of child hostages) was shot on location in Vladikavkaz, where the actual events took place, for 26 days. It was planned that the shooting of some scenes would take place in Israel, but instead the director had to use Moscow for Tel Aviv locations. The scenes of the Israeli Foreign Ministry were filmed at the Hotel Russia, whereas Moscow's Sheremetyevo Airport stood in for Tel Aviv's Ben Gurion Airport.
