= To Kill a Dragon =

- Directed by: Mark Zakharov
- Screenplay by: Grigori Gorin; Mark Zakharov
- Based on: Dragon by Evgeny Schwartz
- Starring: Aleksandr Abdulov; Oleg Yankovsky; Yevgeny Leonov; Vyacheslav Tikhonov; Alexandra Zakharova; Viktor Rakov
- Cinematography: Vladimir Nakhabtsev
- Music by: Gennady Gladkov
- Production companies: Mosfilm; Sovinfilm; Bavaria Film; ZDF; Ritm
- Release date: 1988
- Running time: 123 minutes
- Countries: Soviet Union; Germany
- Language: Russian

To Kill a Dragon (Russian: Убить дракона, romanized: Ubit drakona) is a 1988 Soviet-German parable fantasy film based on the play of Evgeny Schwartz Dragon (1942–1944), directed by Mark Zakharov (marking his final film until 2002).

The film was a joint production of Soviet Union and West Germany film studio Mosfilm (through Sovinfilm), Bavaria Film and ZDF.

== Plot ==
A wandering knight Lancelot, a distant descendant on the maternal side of the famous Sir Lancelot, comes to a city which has been ruled by a fierce dragon for four hundred years. Most of the residents do not want to be rescued from the tyranny of the monstrous serpent, explaining its historical importance.

Lancelot, saving the Dragon's victim, an innocent girl, challenges the monster to a fight. In the underground city there are people who help the knight to find weapons and get ready for an unequal fight. Lancelot defeats the Dragon, but he gets wounded and goes into hiding. In the city the dragon's rule is replaced by chaos.

Gradually, the bygone story becomes the past, and the city is getting new decrees. After the fight with the Dragon, the city mayor who at his rule served as a puppet claims victory over the Dragon. Lancelot is forced to return to the city to explain to the residents that in itself the death of the Dragon only means that it is time for each kill a dragon in themselves and that he will make all residents to do so. However, as he does so, the inhabitants of the town come to see him as the next dragon and bow before their new master.

Lancelot goes away from the people. He sees children playing with the Dragon who has shapeshifted from a dark and cynical warlord to a good-natured bearded man. The Dragon offers not to continue battling with the children present but Lancelot refuses. The Dragon declares that the most interesting bit is about to begin. Lancelot, the Dragon and the children leave.

== Cast ==
- Aleksandr Abdulov as Lancelot
- Oleg Yankovsky as The Dragon
- Yevgeny Leonov as Burgermeister
- Vyacheslav Tikhonov as Charlemagne
- Alexandra Zakharova as Elsa (singing voice by Larisa Dolina)
- Viktor Rakov as Heinrich, Burgermeister's son
- Aleksandr Zbruyev as Friedrichsen
- Semyon Farada as Conductor
- Aleksandr Filippenko as Blacksmith-gunsmith
- Andrei Tolubeyev as Hatter
- Slava Polunin as Balloonist

== Impression ==
In the film, shot in the genre of a philosophical fairy tale, the world of the Dragon appears, according to the director’s idea, as a parody of the USSR, and in the scenery, stylized as the Middle Ages, elements from Soviet everyday life can be traced. There are allusions to Soviet leaders in the film, the children resemble pioneers, and the meetings of the city's rulers are held like party meetings. Representatives of the intelligentsia (primarily the archivist) demonstrate agreement with the ideas of the Dragon, referring viewers to the servile practices of Soviet intellectuals. The ethical dilemmas of the archivist Charlemagne demonstrate what members of the Soviet intelligentsia experienced when they were forced to publicly agree with the dictates of the authorities. The era of stagnation is defined as a natural legacy of mass violence, unsuccessful attempts at reform, demoralization, disappointment, fatigue, which were covered with lofty words. “To Kill the Dragon” generally carries a pessimistic mood, the main idea of which is to prove that there will be no miracle, and the prospects for the emergence of a free person after defeating the Dragon are shown as very vague.

== Awards ==
In 1990 the film won the Nika Award in two nominations:

- Costume Designer (Natalya Moneva)
- Music for the film (Gennady Gladkov)
