= The General (1992 film) =

- Directed by: Igor Nikolayev
- Written by: Vasily Solovyov; Igor Nikolayev
- Starring: Vladimir Gostyukhin; Irina Akulova; Aleksei Zharkov
- Cinematography: Nikolai Zholudev
- Music by: Aleksei Nikolayev
- Production company: Gorky Film Studio
- Release date: 1992
- Running time: 98 minutes
- Country: Russia
- Languages: Russian, German

The General (Russian: Генерал) is a 1992 Russian biographical war film directed by Igor Nikolayev about officer Alexander Gorbatov.

== Plot ==
March 1941. Sentenced to a long prison term, Brigade Commander (Kombrig) Gorbatov is released from the Lubyanka and shortly afterward takes command of a unit at the front. A capable leader, he quickly rises through the ranks, becoming a lieutenant general and commanding an army. Compared with other Soviet commanders, including Georgy Zhukov, Gorbatov is distinguished by understanding the realities of the modern battlefield, the independence of courts and decisions and the ability to persuade his superiors.

As the war progresses, Gorbatov faces not only the German invaders but also the omnipotence of political officers and the ignorance of some commanders. Through his story, the film portrays the Red Army during the early months of the Great Patriotic War, emphasizing its generally low combat readiness and the constraints on command imposed by the directives of the Stavka and Comrade Stalin.

The narrative also alludes to the Stalinist purges of the 1930s, including the imprisonment of Gorbatov and many of his friends—heroes of the Russian Civil War.

== Cast ==
- Vladimir Gostyukhin — Alexander Gorbatov
- Irina Akulova — Nina Alexandrovna Gorbatova, wife
- Aleksei Zharkov — Lev Mekhlis
- Alexander Khochinsky — Boris Pasternak
- Vladimir Menshov — Georgy Zhukov
- Igor Shapovalov — Semyon Timoshenko
- Eugene Karelskikh — Konstantin Rokossovsky
- Vasily Popov — Leontiy Guriev
- Svetlana Konovalova — Tatyana Yurievna, widow of the commander Konstantin Ushakov
- Vladimir Romanovsky — Nikita Khrushchev
