= Yellow Dwarf (film) =

- Russian: Жёлтый карлик
- Directed by: Dmitry Astrakhan
- Written by: Oleg Danilov
- Starring: Aleksandr Abdulov; Elena Proklova; Igor Bochkin; Anna Legchilova; Larisa Boruchko
- Cinematography: Jerzy Goscik
- Production company: GP Group
- Release date: 2001
- Running time: 100 min.
- Country: Russia
- Language: Russian

Yellow Dwarf (Russian: Жёлтый карлик, romanized: Zhyoltyy karlik) is a 2001 Russian comedy film directed by Dmitry Astrakhan.

== Plot ==
The film tells about the love of a saleswoman and a guy from the family of a famous writer, whose parents will do everything possible to prevent a wedding.

== Cast ==
- Aleksandr Abdulov as Vladimir Zharovsky
- Elena Proklova as Lida Zharovskaya
- Igor Bochkin as Mikhail Semyonov
- Anna Legchilova as Vika, Kolya's girlfriend
- Larisa Boruchko as Galya (Vladimir's mistress)
- Elena Biryukova as Ira
- Mikhail Parygin as Kolya Zharovsky
- Regina Dombrovskaya as episode
- Andrey Dushechkin as episode
- Tamara Muzhenko as episode
