= Nina Agapova =

Soviet actress (1926–2021)

- Agapova in 2006
- Born: Nina Fyodorovna Agapova; 30 May 1926; Moscow, RSFSR, USSR
- Died: 19 November 2021 (aged 95)
- Education: All-Union State Institute of Cinematography
- Occupation: Actress
- Years active: 1941-2015
- Children: 1

Nina Fyodorovna Agapova (Russian: Ни́на Фёдоровна Ага́пова; 30 May 1926 – 19 November 2021) was a Soviet and Russian actress.

== Life and career ==
Agapova was born in Moscow in May 1926. She finished eight grades, but was not able to complete her education, as the Great Patriotic War began. She joined the Yarkov Choir, which performed in more than 500 military units, including front-line, over four years. After that, she passed the exams for a certificate as an external student.

Her career in cinema began with participation in crowd scenes at Mosfilm. On one of the shoots she was noticed by the assistant director, who suggested that she try to enter Gerasimov Institute of Cinematography. In 1946, she enrolled in the experimental director-actor course. At the entrance exams she met her future husband. She graduated in 1951.

After assignment, she got into the State Theatre of Cinema Actors. There she was noticed and began to be invited to various roles, including the main ones. In 1965, she got the lead role in the first musical ever staged on the Moscow stage, Kiss Me, Kate. Career in the cinema was formed differently. Mostly she was invited to episodic roles, in which she nevertheless laid out to the full. In the history of Soviet cinema Nina Agapova is remembered as the "queen of episodes". For the first time she got a big role in 1953 in the film Good Morning. The next came to her only ten years later, when she played Zinaida in Eldar Ryazanov comedy Give me a book of complaints.

In 1987, she was named an Honored Artist of the RSFSR.

She continued performing on stage until the age of 90.

Agapova died on 19 November 2021, at the age of 95. She was buried at the Kuntsevo Cemetery beside her husband.

== Family ==
She married Sergei Poluyanov (1924-1983), a cinematographer and Honoured Art Worker of the RSFSR.

Their son Alexander was born on 31 December 1953. Like his father, he graduated from the cameraman's faculty. He died on 28 December 1996 because of problems with creditors.

She had a grandson Sergei, who graduated from television cameraman courses and shoots commercials. He took care of Nina Agapova until her death. Her granddaughter lives in Australia.

== Selected filmography ==
- The Unamenables (1959) as host of the contest
- Dead Souls (1960) as lady at the ball (uncredited)
- Give Me a Book of Complaints (1965) as barmaid Zinaida
- A Literature Lesson (1968) as student's mother
- Seven Old Men and a Girl (1968) as Kravtsova
- Adventures of the Yellow Suitcase (1970) as mother
- The Twelve Chairs (1971) as soloist of theater
- Grandads-Robbers (1971) as the museum keeper
- The Crown of the Russian Empire, or Once Again the Elusive Avengers (1971) as an american woman with a parrot
- Ilf and Petrov Rode a Tram (1972) as Vera, Kapitulov's wife
- Northern Rhapsody (1974) as correspondent
- The Tavern on Pyatnitskaya (1978) as buyer of a ring
- The Invisible Man (1984) as Jenny Hall
- Zina-Zinulya (1986) as secretary
- Forgotten Melody for a Flute (1987) as Tatyana Georgievna, secretary
- The Kreutzer Sonata (1987) as Leocadia Petrovna
- Where is the Nophelet? (1988) as aunt Emma
- Private Detective, or Operation Cooperation (1989) as Gypsy woman
- The Envy of Gods (2000) as Kaleria Georgievna
