= A Literature Lesson =

1968 film by Aleksey Korenev

- Russian: Урок литературы
- Directed by: Alexey Korenev
- Written by: Viktoriya Tokareva
- Produced by: Grigory Lukin
- Starring: Yevgeny Steblov; Leonid Kuravlyov; Inna Makarova; Valentina Malyavina; Yevgeny Leonov
- Cinematography: Vladimir Mejbom
- Music by: Eduard Artemyev
- Production company: Mosfilm
- Release date: 1968
- Running time: 75 min.
- Country: Soviet Union
- Language: Russian

A Literature Lesson (Russian: Урок литературы, romanized: Urok literatury) is a 1968 Soviet comedy-drama film directed by Alexey Korenev.

== Plot ==
The film tells about a teacher who does not like his work. He understands that something needs to be changed and from now he decides to speak only the truth. This leads to conflicts at school and in personal life.

== Cast ==
- Yevgeny Steblov as Konstantin Mikhailovich, teacher of literature
- Leonid Kuravlyov as Savely Sidorov
- Inna Makarova as Vera Petrovna
- Valentina Malyavina as Nina Vronskaya
- Yevgeny Leonov as Pavel Petrovich Vronsky
- Nina Agapova as student's mother
- Lyubov Dobrzhanskaya as Anna Tyurina
- Victoria Fyodorova as Lena
- Anatoly Linkov as Kolya Sobakin
- Andrey Mironov as Felix
- Gotlib Roninson as Igor Raimondovich
