= Aleksandr Grave =

Russian actor (1920–2010)

Aleksandr Konstantinovich Grave (Russian: Александр Константинович Граве; September 8, 1920 – March 5, 2010) was a Russian actor with a long and distinguished career who played over 150 roles at the Vakhtangov Theatre in Moscow. He played in the films Barrier of the Unknown (1961) and Chronicles of a Dive Bomber (1967).

== Early life ==
Grave was born on September 8, 1920, in Moscow. From 1938 to 1942 he studied acting at the Boris Shchukin Theatre Institute of the Vakhtangov Theatre and later graduated in 1942. He served in the Red Army entertainment unit in World War II, Berlin, Germany, and was decorated for his artistry and lifting the spirits of soldiers at the time when they were fighting the Nazis.

== Career ==
After fighting in the war, Grave began his career as a Russian actor, playing in 31 movies. His first film was A Noisy Household in 1946. Grave was awarded the title of People's Artist of the RSFSR in 1971.

== Death ==
Aleksandr Grave died on March 5, 2010, aged 89, of undisclosed causes.
