= Aleksei Zharkov =

Soviet and Russian actor

- Алексей Жарков
- Zharkov in 1988
- Born: Aleksei Dmitrievich Zharkov; 27 March 1948; Moscow, RSFSR, USSR
- Died: 5 June 2016 (aged 68); Moscow, Russia
- Occupation: actor
- Years active: 1962—2009
- Awards: People's Artist of Russia; Order of Friendship

Aleksei Dmitrievich Zharkov (Russian: Алексей Дмитриевич Жарков; 27 March 1948 – 5 June 2016) was a Soviet and Russian film and theater actor. He was a People's Artist of Russia (1994).

== Biography ==
Aleksei Dmitrievich Zharkov was born on March 27, 1948, in Moscow.

In 1960, the director Mark Donskoy chose Aleksei for the role of Petit in his film Hello, Children! (1962), where the 14-year old Zharkov played one of the main roles a Soviet teenager who becomes friends with a Japanese girl who survived the tragedy of Hiroshima. In 1963, Zharkov was confirmed for an episodic role in Rolan Bykov's comedy The Lost Summer. In 1966, Zharkov starred in the role of Kohl in the military film Such a Big Boy.

Aleksei Zharkov graduated from Moscow Art Theater School (acting course of Alexander Karev). Between 1971 and 1988 Zharkov was an actor of the Yermolova Theatre. In 1988–2000 years an actor of Chekhov Moscow Art Theatre. Zharkov returned to Yermolova's Theater in 2000.

Later, Zharkov took part in the performances of the St. Petersburg Theater Center on Kolomenskaya.

In the late 1970s, Zharkov played the role of Nicholas's driver in the film Getting to Know the Big, Wide World (1978) by Kira Muratova, after which he began actively acting in films. Zharkov played both major and minor roles in the films The Last Hunt (1979), The Wife Forsaken (1979), The Quay (1979), The Cask with the Cucumber (1979), The Scream of the Loon (1980), Citizen Leshka (1980), The Night Accident (1980), Three Times about Love (1981).

The first great success was brought to Zharkov in the works Torpedo Bearers (1983) by Semyon Aranovich and My Friend Ivan Lapshin by Aleksei German (1984), as well as in the drama Parade of the Planets (1984) by Vadim Abdrashitov.

In total, Aleksei Zharkov played more than a hundred roles in the cinema, among which was Taras Postnikov in the historical film Mikhailo Lomonosov (1984-1986), policeman William Henry Blore in the Soviet film adaptation of Agatha Christie's And Then There Were None (1987), banker Danglars in the adventure film The Prisoner of Château d'If (1988), investigator Sergei Ryabinin in the film Criminal Talent (1988), criminal Chibis in the action movie Let Sleeping Dogs Lie (1991), lawyer Ivan Stashkov in the black comedy Stalin's Testament (1993), Artemy Filippovich Strawberry in comedy Inspector (1996), a self-taught breeder Gladishev in the comedy Life and Extraordinary Adventures of Private Ivan Chonkin (1993), the head of the Ministry of Internal Affairs in the historical drama Khrustalyov, My Car! (1998).

Among the last works of the actor was the role of Aleksei Dolgoruky in the historical series by Svetlana Druzhinina Secrets of Palace Coups (2000-2008), member of the combat group Pyotr Kosenko in the action series Zeta Group (2007-2009), the head physician in the drama by Karen Shakhnazarov Ward №6 (2009).

== Honors ==
Alexei Zharkov was awarded the title of Honored Artist of the RSFSR (1984), People's Artist of Russia (1994), awarded the Order of Friendship (1998).

== Personal life ==
Aleksei Zharkov married only once, in 1972 to a former flight attendant Lybov. They had two children: Maxim (employed as a police inspector) and Anastasia, who like her famous father went into the acting profession.

In 2012, Zharkov experienced a stroke, after which the actor became temporarily paralyzed. After that he lived in his dacha outside of Moscow. At the beginning of March 2016 he suffered a new attack. Aleksei Zharkov died on 5 June 2016 in Moscow; the cause of death was heart failure after a long illness. The actor is buried in a small cemetery in the Naro-Fominsk.

== Selected filmography ==
- Hello, Children! (Здравствуйте, дети!, 1962) as Petya
- The Wife Has Left (Жена ушла) (1979) as Petrenko
- We Weren't Married in Church (Нас венчали не в церкви, 1983) as Ivan Fedorovich
- My Friend Ivan Lapshin (Мой друг Иван Лапшин, 1984) as Vasya Okoshkin
- Planet Parade (Парад планет, 1984) as Ruslan Slonov
- And Then There Were None (Десять негритят, 1987) as detective William Blore
- The Life of Klim Samgin (Жизнь Клима Самгина, 1987) as Vladimir Liutov
- Zerograd (Город Зеро, 1988) as police detective
- Criminal talent (Криминальный талант, 1988) as investigator Sergey Ryabinin
- The Prisoner of Château d'If (Узник замка Иф, 1988) as Danglar
- The Lady with the parrot (Дама с попугаем, 1988) as Sergey Zverev
- How Dark the Nights Are on the Black Sea (В городе Сочи тёмные ночи, 1989) as Stepanych
- Imitator (Имитатор, 1990) as Lev Kozak
- Lost in Siberia (Затерянный в Сибири, 1991) as Nikola
- The General (Генерал 1992) as Lev Mekhlis
- White King, Red Queen (Белый король, красная королева, 1992) as Sergey Zhirov
- Prediction (Предсказание, 1993) as Igor Poplawski
- Dreams (Сны, 1993) as Klotchkov
- Life and Extraordinary Adventures of Private Ivan Chonkin (Жизнь и необычайные приключения солдата Ивана Чонкина, 1994) as Gladishev
- The Fatal Eggs (Роковые яйца, 1996) as Shchukin
- Prisoner of the Mountains (Кавказский пленник, 1996) as Maslov
- Inspector (Ревизор, 1996) as Artemy Filippovich Zemlyanika, trustee of charitable institutions
- Khrustalyov, My Car! (Хрусталёв, машину!, 1998) as head of the Ministry of Internal Affairs of USSR
- The Sword Bearer (Меченосец, 2006) as father

== Awards ==
- Honored Artist of RSFSR (1984)
- People's Artist of Russia (1994)
- Order of Friendship (1998)
