= Criminal Talent =

- Written by: Stanislav Rodionov, Yuri Makarov
- Directed by: Sergey Ashkenazi
- Starring: Aleksei Zharkov; Alexandra Zakharova
- Music by: Alexander Knaifel
- Country of origin: Soviet Union
- Original language: Russian

Production
- Cinematography: Sergei Stasenko
- Running time: 155 minutes
- Production company: Odessa Film Studio

Original release
- Release: 1988

Criminal Talent (Russian: Криминальный талант, romanized: Kriminalnyy talant) is a 1988 Soviet two-part television crime feature film, a screen version of the same story by Stanislav Rodionov.

== Plot ==
In Leningrad, there are a number of similar crimes associated with fraud and theft. Men get acquainted with a girl in a restaurant, drink a few glasses of alcohol and come to their senses in a completely different place, without money in their pockets. Investigator Sergei Ryabinin and police captain Vadim Petelnikov are beginning to hunt for the crooks, but it soon becomes clear that there is only one girl, a real "criminal talent". When following the alleged criminal, Peltelnikov himself becomes her victim. In the end he succeeds in tracking down the thief, but she brazenly runs right out from under the nose of the unlucky police officers.

Soon again unusual crimes begin in the city. On behalf of the victims to their relatives' addresses, "tragic" telegrams arrive with the request to send money, and nobody can explain how the criminals manage to get the confidential information. Investigator Ryabinin is sure that this is the tricks of the same girl whom he is hunting. Ryabinin unravels the criminal's secret, arranges a trap for her, and finally, the fraudster Alexandra Rukoyatkina is caught.

But now the most difficult part begins. The "criminal talent" is imprisoned, but the evidence against her is extremely unconvincing, and the court will probably not take it into account. The investigator has a difficult psychological duel, the result of which should be a candid confession of the young criminal.

== Cast ==
- Aleksei Zharkov as Sergey Ryabinin, investigator
- Alexandra Zakharova as Alexandra Rukoyatkina, swindler
- Igor Nefyodov as Vadim Petelnikov, police captain
- Vladimir Korenev as Sergey Kurikin, victim
- Vladimir Simonov as Victor Kaplichenkov, victim
- Lyudmila Davydova as Lyudmila Afanasyevna, the commandant of the hostel
- Yanislav Levinzon as tailor, victim
- Oleg Filimonov as waiter
- Oleg Shkolnik as the seller in the furniture store
- Svetlana Fabrikant as girl at a restaurant
- Alla Budnitskaya as Ustyuzhanina, an ambulance doctor
- Yuriy Dubrovin as educator Snegirev nicknamed Karmazin
- Anna Nazareva as Alexandra Rukoyatkina's friend
- Viktor Pavlovsky as Ivan Savelovich, police major in the sobering-up station
- Yevgeniy Ganelin as police sergeant
- Elena Borzunova as Masha Gvozdikina, secretary of the prosecutor's office
