= Andrei Andreyevich Eshpai =

Andrei Andreyevich Eshpai (Russian: Андре́й Андре́евич Эшпа́й; born 18 April 1956) is a Russian film director, screenwriter and producer of Mari descent.

== Biography ==
He is the son of the composer Andrei Yakovlevich Eshpai, and the grandson of the composer Yakov Andreyevich Eshpai. He has a wife – actress Yevgeniya Simonova, a daughter – Mariya Eshpai and stepdaughter – actress Zoya Kaidanovskaya (daughter of Yevgeniya Simonova and her first husband – actor Aleksandr Kaidanovsky).

He studied at the Moscow State Institute of Culture in 1975-76 graduated from the Gerasimov Institute of Cinematography in 1980.

== Filmography ==
- 1983 – When Was Played Music of Bakh
- 1988 – The Buffoon
- 1988 – The Jester
- 1991 – Humiliated and Insulted
- 2001 – Flowering Hill Among Bossom Field
- 2004 – Children of the Arbat
- 2006 – Ellipsis
- 2009 – Ivan the Terrible
