= Yakov Eshpai =

Russian composer

Yakov Andreyevich Eshpai (Russian: Я́ков Андре́евич Эшпа́й; 30 October [O.S. 18 October] 1890 – 20 February 1963) was a Russian composer and music teacher. He studied under Georgi Conus at the Moscow Conservatory. He was ethnic Mari. He is partly noted for his work concerning the folk music of the Mari people. He was the father of the better-known composer Andrei Eshpai, and the grandfather of the filmmaker Andrei Andreyevich Eshpai.
