= The Jester (1988 film) =

- Russian: Шут
- Directed by: Andrei Andreyevich Eshpai
- Written by: Yuriy Vyazemskiy
- Starring: Dmitri Vesensky; Marina Mayevskaya; Igor Kostolevskiy; Genrietta Yegorova; Yelena Yevseyenko
- Cinematography: Aleksandr Kazarenskov
- Edited by: Svetlana Desnitskaya
- Music by: Andrey Ledenyov
- Release date: 1988
- Running time: 99 minute
- Country: Soviet Union
- Language: Russian

The Jester (Russian: Шут, romanized: Shut) is a 1988 Soviet drama film directed by Andrei Andreyevich Eshpai.

The film tells about a smart boy who takes revenge on others for his grievances, but cannot resist the beautiful classmate Ira.

== Plot ==
The film unfolds through four interconnected novellas—“Jesters,” “The Jester’s Love,” “The Jester’s Illness,” and “The Last Jester”—all linked by a single narrative arc and recurring central characters.

Valentin Uspensky, a bright and successful high school student with a sharp intellect, sees himself as a “natural-born psychologist.” Using a unique set of psychological techniques he calls “shuteny” (with his method named “shute”), he conducts experiments on those around him—teachers, classmates, and even strangers. His games, sometimes harsh, are justified in his mind by a noble purpose: “to prick preemptively, so life doesn’t scar them.” The only one who seems to understand his behavior is his math teacher, Igor Alexandrovich. Adhering to his belief that “hypocrisy is a tool to use external flaws to better the world,” Valentin attracts the attention of a classmate, Irina Bogdanova, who is intrigued by his unusual approach. She begins provoking him, first by asking him to “prick” random strangers, then proposing an intimate relationship, and finally leading him to her friends, where she retreats with one of them in a display meant to provoke him. Upset by this “prick” at his own game, Valentin responds recklessly, inciting the aggression of the others and deliberately provoking a physical altercation. Returning home afterward, he disdainfully rejects the values of his parents, a professor of Japanese studies and his devoted wife.

Obsessed with correcting people's flaws, Valentin goes further, challenging his teachers—including the school's vice principal—and pushing them to the brink of emotional collapse. His ultimate plan is to trap his math teacher in a psychological snare, but the teacher anticipates his student's strategy, leaving Valentin, in the end, at a psychological disadvantage.

== Cast ==
- Dmitri Vesensky
- Marina Mayevskaya
- Igor Kostolevskiy
- Genrietta Yegorova
- Yelena Yevseyenko
- Anatoliy Grachyov
- Aleksandr Zabolotsky
- Vasiliy Michkov
- Andrei Semyonov
- Gelena Kirik
