= Kerosene Salesman's Wife =

- Russian: Жена керосинщика
- Directed by: Alexander Kaidanovsky
- Written by: Alexander Kaidanovsky
- Starring: Vytautas Paukste; Aleksandr Baluev; Anna Myasoyedova; Sergey Veksler; Evgeniy Mironov
- Cinematography: Aleksey Rodionov
- Music by: Aleksandr Goldshteyn
- Release date: 1988
- Running time: 101
- Country: Soviet Union
- Language: Russian

Kerosene Salesman's Wife (Russian: Жена керосинщика) is a 1988 Soviet fantasy drama film directed by Alexander Kaidanovsky.

== Plot ==
The film tells about two brother doctors, one of whom operated on a boy, and the other assisted him. A blood transfusion was necessary and the surgeon poured the boy blood of the wrong group, as a result of which the boy died, and the brothers' life changed. The first became a kerosene salesman, the second - the chairman of the City Council.

== Cast ==
- Vytautas Paukste
- Aleksandr Baluev
- Anna Myasoyedova
- Sergey Veksler
- Evgeniy Mironov
