= Viktor Avilov (actor) =

Russian actor

Viktor Avilov Ви́ктор Ави́лов (in Russian)
- Born: Viktor Vasilyevich Avilov; August 8, 1953; Moscow, USSR
- Died: August 21, 2004 (aged 51); Novosibirsk, Russia
- Resting place: Vostryakovskoye Cemetery, Moscow
- Years active: 1975–2004

Viktor Vasilyevich Avilov (Russian: Ви́ктор Васи́льевич Ави́лов; August 8, 1953 – August 21, 2004) was a Soviet and Russian film and theater actor, Honored Artist of the Russian Federation (1993). He is best known for his roles in the 1988 films Mister Designer and The Prisoner of Château d'If.

== Biography ==
=== Early life ===
Viktor Vasilievich Avilov was born on August 8, 1953, in Moscow in a family of laborers.

In 1972 he graduated from the Moscow Industrial College, specializing in "Installation and adjustment of automatic control systems", and served in the army from 1972 to 1974. He worked as a technician for instrumentation and as a driver.

=== Theatre ===
In 1974, Viktor Avilov began to participate in the work of an amateur theatrical company, created by Valery Belyakovich in the village of Vostryakovo outside Moscow. In 1975, he appeared in the premiere performance of Vostryakov residents Marriage in the role of Kochkarev.

In 1977, after the unification of the Vostryak troupe with the actors of the Young Muscovite Theater at the Palace of Pioneers on the Lenin Hills, the Theater Studio in the Southwest appeared. In 1979 Avilov started working here. In 1980, the premiere of the play Moliere based on the play by Mikhail Bulgakov The Cabal of Hypocrites, in which Viktor Avilov played the main role.

One of the staged roles of the actor took place in 1984, he played Hamlet in the performance of the same name. In 1987, the play participated in the Edinburgh Festival.

Among the roles of Viktor Avilov in the Theater Studio in the Southwest: actor in The Lower Depths, Donalbain in Macbeth, Woland in The Master and Margarita, Caligula in Caligula, Khlestakov in The Government Inspector, Berange in Rhinoceros, tailor and Thisbe in A Midsummer Night's Dream, Chief in Agent 00, Pashka in Pretender, the role of Mercutio and Paris in Romeo and Juliet, Varravina in the Trilogy and many others.

In the 2000s, Viktor Avilov was also engaged in performances of other theaters: the Dance of Death (2001, Kurt) at the Theatre of Nations, in Don Quixote (2001, Don Quixote) at the Clownery Theater under the direction of Teresa Durova, About the Hobbits, or There and Back (2002, The Leader of the Goblins and the Dragon Red Smog) at the Kino Performance Theatre; Perfume (2002, Grenouille) in the theater "Art House"; in The Master and Margarita (2003, Woland) in the private project Russian Independent Theater, etc.

In 2002, Avilov worked as a choreographer in the play Perfume of the Art House Theatre, staging two contemporary style dances for his Grenouille. In the same year at the Cinema he opened his acting school.

In 2004 Viktor Avilov tried himself in directing. In the theater Kino Performance Theatre he worked on staging the play The Sinful Village of Dalskabata, or the Forgotten Devil based on the play of Czech playwright Jan Drda.

=== Film ===
His cinematic debut was in the 1988 horror film Mister Designer based on the story of Green's "The Gray Car" and he also acted in the film The Prisoner of Château d'If based on the novel The Count of Monte Cristo which was also released in the same year.

Viktor Avilov starred in the films On the Grass Barefoot (1987), Love for Neighbor (1988), The Art of Living in Odessa (1989), Safari No. 6 (1990), Polygon (1990), Dissolved Evil (1991), Dancing Ghosts (1992), Psychic (1992), Musketeers Twenty Years After (1992), Cockroach Run (1993), Antifaust (1993), Wolf's Blood (1995), The Frog Princess (1998); Synoptic (2002), The Golden Head on the Scaffold (2004) and others.

== Personal life ==
=== Marriages and children ===
Viktor Avilov was married three times, he has two daughters.

=== Illness and death ===
In the last years of his life, the actor had health problems. In 1995, during a tour in Berlin, he was hospitalized with the diagnosis of perforated ulcer and suffered a clinical death twice. In 2004, Avilov was diagnosed with cancer.

Viktor Avilov died on August 21, 2004, in the Akademgorodok of Novosibirsk. He was buried at Vostryakovskoe cemetery in Moscow.

== Selected filmography ==
- Mister Designer (Russian: Господин оформитель, 1988) as Platon Andreevich
- The Prisoner of Château d'If (Узник замка Иф, 1988) as mature Edmond Dantès / Count of Monte Cristo
- Musketeers Twenty Years After (Мушкетёры двадцать лет спустя, 1992) as Mordaunt
