= Andrei Eshpai =

Soviet and Russian composer (1925–2015)

- Андрей Эшпай
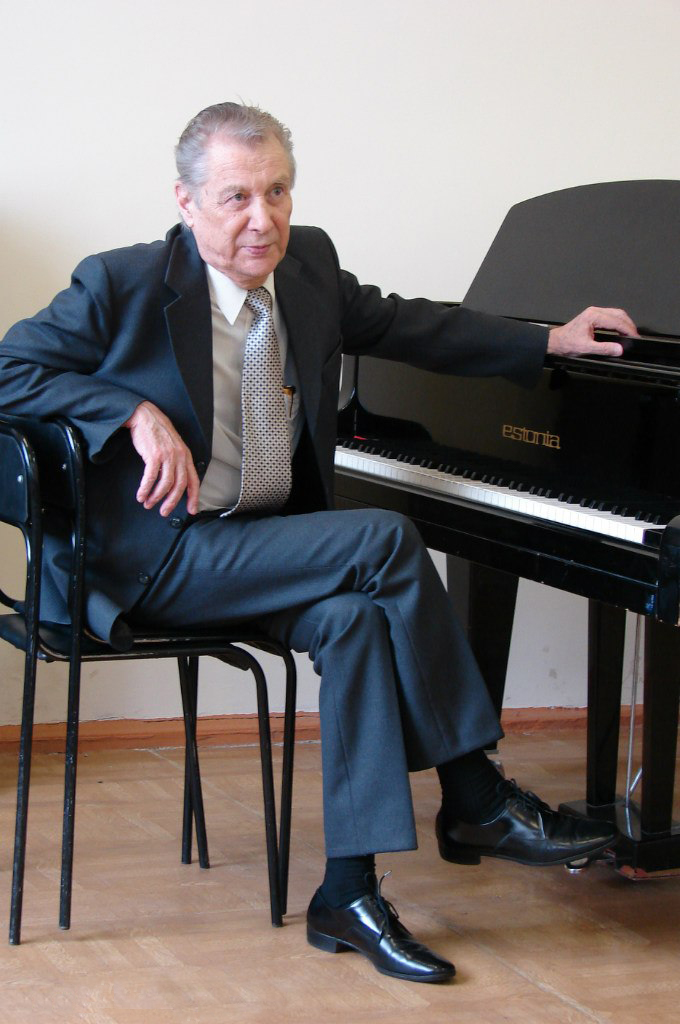
- Eshpai in 2007
- Born: May 15, 1925; Kozmodemyansk, Russian SFSR, Soviet Union
- Died: November 8, 2015 (aged 90); Moscow, Russia
- Resting place: Novodevichy Cemetery
- Education: Moscow Conservatory
- Occupation: Composer
- Era: 20th century
- Children: Andrei Andreyevich Eshpai
- Parent: Yakov Andreyevich Eshpai

Andrei Yakovlevich Eshpai (Note: Hill Mari: Андрей Яковлевич Эшпай, romanized: Andrey Yakovlevich Eshpay; Russian: Андрей Яковлевич Эшпай, romanized: Andrey Yakovlevich Eshpay) (15 May 1925 – 8 November 2015) was a Soviet composer. He was awarded the title of People's Artist of the USSR in 1981.

== Biography ==
Eshpai was born at Kozmodemyansk, Mari ASSR, Russian SFSR to a Mari father and Russian mother. A Red Army World War II veteran, he studied piano at Moscow Conservatory from 1948 to 1953 under Vladimir Sofronitsky, and composition under Nikolai Rakov, Nikolai Myaskovsky and Evgeny Golubev. He performed his postgraduate study under Aram Khachaturian from 1953 to 1956.

Eshpai was the son of the composer Yakov Eshpai, and the father of the filmmaker Andrei Andreyevich Eshpai.

On 8 November 2015, Eshpai died in Moscow from a stroke at the age of 90.

== Notable works ==
=== Stage ===
- Nobody Is Happier Than Me, operetta (1968–1969); libretto by V. Konstantinov and B. Ratser
- Love Is Forbidden, musical (1973)
- Angara, ballet (1974–1975)
- A Circle, ballet (1979–1980)

=== Orchestral ===
- Symphonic Dances on Mari Themes (1951)
- Symphony no. 1 in E♭ minor (1959)
- Symphony no. 2 in A major "Praise the Light" (1962)
- Symphony no. 3 (1964)
- Symphony no. 4 "Symphony-Ballet" (1980–1981)
- Simon Bolivar, Symphonic Poem (1982)
- Symphony No. 5 (1985)
- Symphony No. 6 "Liturgic" for mixed chorus, baritone (or bass) and symphony orchestra (1988)
- Symphony No. 7 (1991)
- Games (1997)
- Symphony No. 8 (2000–2001)
- Symphony No. 9 "Four Verses" for symphony orchestra, mixed chorus and narrators (1998–1999)

=== Concertante ===
- Piano Concerto No. 1 in F♯ minor (1954)
- Violin Concerto No. 1 in G minor (1956)
- Concerto Grosso, Concerto for orchestra with solo trumpet, piano, vibraphone and double bass (1966–1967)
- Piano Concerto No. 2 (1972)
- Violin Concerto No. 2 (1977)
- Viola Concerto (1987)
- Cello Concerto (1989)
- Clarinet Concerto (1995)
- Flute Concerto (1992)
- Violin Concerto No. 3 "Bartok Concerto" (1990–1992)
- Violin Concerto No. 4 (1993)
- Oboe Concerto (1982)
- Concerto for trumpet, trombone and orchestra (1994–1995)
- Double Bass Concerto (1994–1995)
- Horn Concerto in F major (1995)
- Tuba Concerto (2001)
- Bassoon Concerto Opus Singularis (2001)

=== Other ===
- 3 violin sonatas
- piano compositions
- songs
