= Amayak Akopyan =

Soviet and Russian actor and circus performer

- Амая́к Арутю́нович Акопя́н
- Born: Amayak Arutyunovich Akopyan; 1 December 1956 (age 69); Moscow, RSFSR, Soviet Union
- Education: Russian Institute of Theatre Arts
- Occupations: Actor, circus artist, TV presenter
- Years active: 1974–present
- Spouse: Yulia Levina-Akopyan (divorce)
- Children: Philipp (born 1983)
- Awards: Merited Artist of the Russian Federation

Amayak Arutyunovich Akopyan (Russian: Амая́к Арутю́нович Акопя́н; Armenian: Հմայակ Հարությունի Հակոբյան); born 1 December 1956, Moscow, USSR) is a Soviet and Russian illusionist, actor, circus artist. Ethnic Armenian. Presidential Decree awarded the honorary title Honored Artist of Russia. The son of the famous magician Arutyun Akopyan and his wife Liya, opera singer. In the movies, originally played jugglers, then switched to the characteristic roles. He is best known for roles in Frenzied Bus (1990) and The Master and Margarita (1994).

Akopyan graduated from the film directing department of GITIS.

In 1996–2001, he was the host of the TV program Good Night, Little Ones! (as Rakhat Lukumych).
