= Lyudmila Zaytseva =

Soviet and Russian actress

- Born: Lyudmila Vasilyevna Zaytseva; 21 July 1946 (age 80) khutor Vostochny, Ust-Labinsky District, Krasnodar Krai, RSFSR, USSR
- Occupation: Actress
- Years active: 1967–present
- Awards: People’s Artist of the RSFSR; USSR State Prize

Lyudmila Vasilyevna Zaytseva (Russian: Людмила Васильевна Зайцева; born 21 July 1946) is a Soviet and Russian film actress, People's Artist of the RSFSR (1989) and laureate of the State Prize of the USSR (1983). Her movie career began in 1967.

During the Russian presidential election of 1996, she was a confidant of Gennady Zyuganov and supported his election campaign by travelling with concert brigades throughout the country.

For more than 30 years, she was married to Gennady Voronin, a screenwriter and film director, who died in 2011. Lyudmila Zaytseva has a daughter from this marriage actress Vasilisa Voronina.

== Selected filmography ==
- The Story of Asya Klyachina (1967)
- The Dawns Here Are Quiet (1972)
- Moscow, My Love (1974)
- Twenty Days Without War (1976)
- Story of an Unknown Man (1980)
- The Train Has Stopped (1982)
- Lev Tolstoy (1984)
- Little Vera (1988)
- Fast Train (1988)
- Sons of Bitches (1990)
- Boys (1990)
- Secrets of Palace Revolutions (2000–2008)
