= Aleksandra Zakharova =

Soviet and Russian actress

Alexandra Zakharova
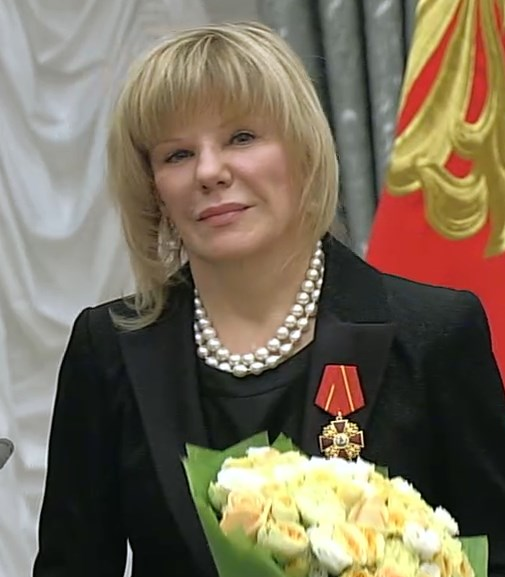
- Aleksandra Zakharova, 2019
- Born: Aleksandra Markovna Zakharova; 17 June 1962 (age 63); Moscow, RSFSR, USSR
- Occupation: Actress
- Years active: since 1982
- Awards: Recipients of the Order "For Merit to the Fatherland", 4th class Order of Honour (Russia)

Aleksandra Markovna Zakharova (Russian: Алекса́ндра Ма́рковна Заха́рова, born 17 June 1962) is a Soviet and Russian actress, daughter of famous film director Mark Zakharov and actress Nina Lapshinova. Zakharova has been awarded the State Prize of the Russian Federation in 1996 and 2002. She is a People's Artist of Russia. She was also awarded Order of Honour (2007) and Order For Merit to the Fatherland, 4th degree (2013).

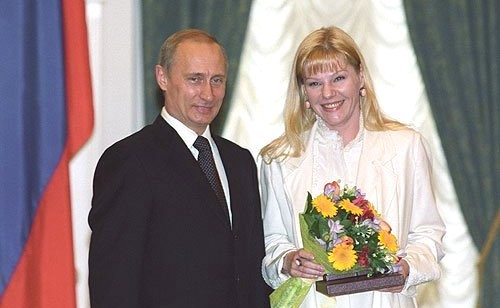
With Vladimir Putin, 10 June 2003

== Filmography ==
- The House That Swift Built (Дом, который построил Свифт, 1982) as Stella (Esther Johnson)
- Formula of Love (Формула любви, 1984) as Fimka
- Criminal Talent (Криминальный талант, 1988) as Alexandra Rukoyatkina
- To Kill a Dragon (Убить дракона, 1988) as Elsa
- The Master and Margarita (Мастер и Маргарита, 1994) as Hella
