= Mister Designer =

- Russian release poster
- Russian: Gospodin oformitel
- Directed by: Oleg Teptsov
- Written by: Yuri Arabov
- Story by: Alexander Grin
- Produced by: Oleg Teptsov
- Starring: Viktor Avilov; Anna Demyanenko; Mikhail Kozakov
- Cinematography: Anatoly Lapshov
- Edited by: Irina Gorokhovskaya
- Music by: Sergey Kuryokhin
- Production company: Lenfilm
- Release date: 1987
- Running time: 103 minutes
- Country: Soviet Union
- Language: Russian

Mister Designer (Russian: Господин оформитель, romanized: Gospodin oformitel) is a 1987 Soviet horror film produced and directed by Oleg Teptsov, and based on the short story The Gray Automobile by Alexander Grin.

== Plot ==
In 1908 St. Petersburg, artist-designer Platon Andreevich is obsessed with the idea of a contest with the Almighty. He wants to prolong the image of Man, even overcoming death, by sculpting and drawing. With his ability to craft magnificent wax mannequins, Platon aims to create something perfect and eternal, not amenable to the passage of time.

Following the debut of a play featuring sets and costumes of his design, Platon receives is hired by a jeweler to decorate his shop. Searching for a model to make a mannequin for the showcase, he finds Anna Beletskaya, a young girl slowly dying from consumption. He sculpts a beautiful mannequin from her likeness, putting his whole soul into work. However, before Platon could pay her, Anna flees the studio.

A few years later, for various reasons, Platon's career is in decline. Due to creative crisis, he has begun to abuse morphine, and faces financial ruins. Desperate, he accepts the offer of a rich businessman by the name of Grilliot, to decorate the interior of his mansion. They travel to Grilliot's mansion in his grey car.

Upon meeting Grilliot's wife Maria, Platon is immediately confused. She bears a striking resemblance to Anna. However, Maria denies knowing Platon or Anna.

Platon Andreevich proposes to Maria/Anna, but receives a refusal: she tells him that he is too poor. Thanks to an incredible chance, at a poker game the designer wins a huge fortune from Grilliot, and makes his offer again, and again receives a refusal. She wouldn't stay with the madman who keeps calling her by another woman's name. The designer seeks to prove Maria is Anna, but he only finds the proof to the opposite. He finds Anna's tomb in a graveyard. In his workshop, he finds Anna's mummy that he believed was a mannequin. He starts to believe that Maria is his sculpture that became alive.

Gradually losing grasp of reality, Platon goes to Grilliot's house, almost getting run over by the grey car. He discovers Grilliot is dead and a wake is being held. His widow reconsidered Platon's proposal and is ready to marry him now. However, Platon accuses her of being a "doll" that took the place of a real person, and hits her with burning log. As she shrieks, part of the skin on her face melts away like wax. The heat from the log temporarily melts her face, exposing her to be an artificial being. The servant who drives the grey car shoots Platon, who is believed dead. Maria's face magically returns to normal.

After a funeral is set up for Platon, he opens his eyes, and escapes the mansion. As he crosses the bridge, he sees they gray car driving towards him. Platon's fate is left ambiguous.

== Cast ==
- Viktor Avilov (debut in the movie) - Platon Andreevich
- Anna Demyanenko - Anna / Maria
- Mikhail Kozakov - Grillo (in the story of A. Greene - Grigno)
- Ivan I. Krasko - servant
- Vadim Lobanov - jeweler
- Valentina Malakhieva - the old woman
- Konstantin Lukashov - cemetery watchman
- Svetlana Panfilova - nun
- Yuri Aroyan - second cemetery watchman
- Vladimir Minyailo - officer
- Azamat Bagirov - card player
- Yuri Bashkov - croupier

== Awards ==
The film won the Nika Award for Best Costume Design by Larisa Konnikova.
