= Valentina Malyavina =

Soviet and Russian actress (1941–2021)

- Malyavina in 1963
- Born: Valentina Aleksandrovna Malyavina; 18 June 1941; Moscow, USSR
- Died: 30 October 2021 (aged 80); Moscow, Russia
- Resting place: Troyekurovskoye Cemetery
- Occupation: Actress
- Years active: 1959–1999

Valentina Aleksandrovna Malyavina (Russian: Валенти́на Алекса́ндровна Маля́вина; 18 June 1941 – 30 October 2021) was a Soviet and Russian actress of theater and cinema. She is best known for roles in Ivan's Childhood (1962) and King Stag (1969).

== Biography ==
Malyavina was born in Moscow on 18 June 1941.

In 1962 she graduated from the Boris Shchukin Theatre Institute and was accepted into the troupe of the Lenkom Theatre. From 1965 to 1979 she served in the Vakhtangov Theatre. In 1979, she moved to the National Film Actors' Theatre, where she worked until 1983, and since 1988 at the Moscow Theatre Artist.

Her first husband (1959–1963) was actor Aleksandr Zbruyev.

In 1978 she was held as a suspect in the murder of her civil husband, actor Stanislav Zhdanko, but the case was closed. In 1983, at the request of the relatives of the deceased, the case was reviewed, and the court sentenced her to nine years in prison. She did not admit her guilt at the trial, she continued to insist on her innocence in an interview given after her release.

In 1988, she was released under an amnesty under the Decree of the Presidium of the Supreme Soviet of the USSR of 18 June 1987, in connection with the seventieth anniversary of Soviet power.

In 1993 she was awarded the title of Honored Artist of Russia.

In 2001, as a result of trauma, she lost her sight, she lived in a specialized boarding house.

She died on 30 October 2021, at the age of 81. She was buried at the Troyekurovskoye Cemetery in Moscow. Her death was announced on 10 November.

== Selected filmography ==
- Ivan's Childhood (1962) as Masha
- A Literature Lesson (1968) as Nina Vronskaya
- King Stag (1969) as Angela
- Red Square (1970) as Natasha Kutasova
- The Nose (1977) as episode (uncredited)
- Tamara Aleksandrovna's Husband and Daughter (1989)

== Honors and awards ==
- Honored Artist of Russia (1993)
- Nika Award (1993) — Best Supporting Actor or Actress (nom)
