= Yuri Kara =

Russian filmmaker (1954–2025)

- Юрий Кара
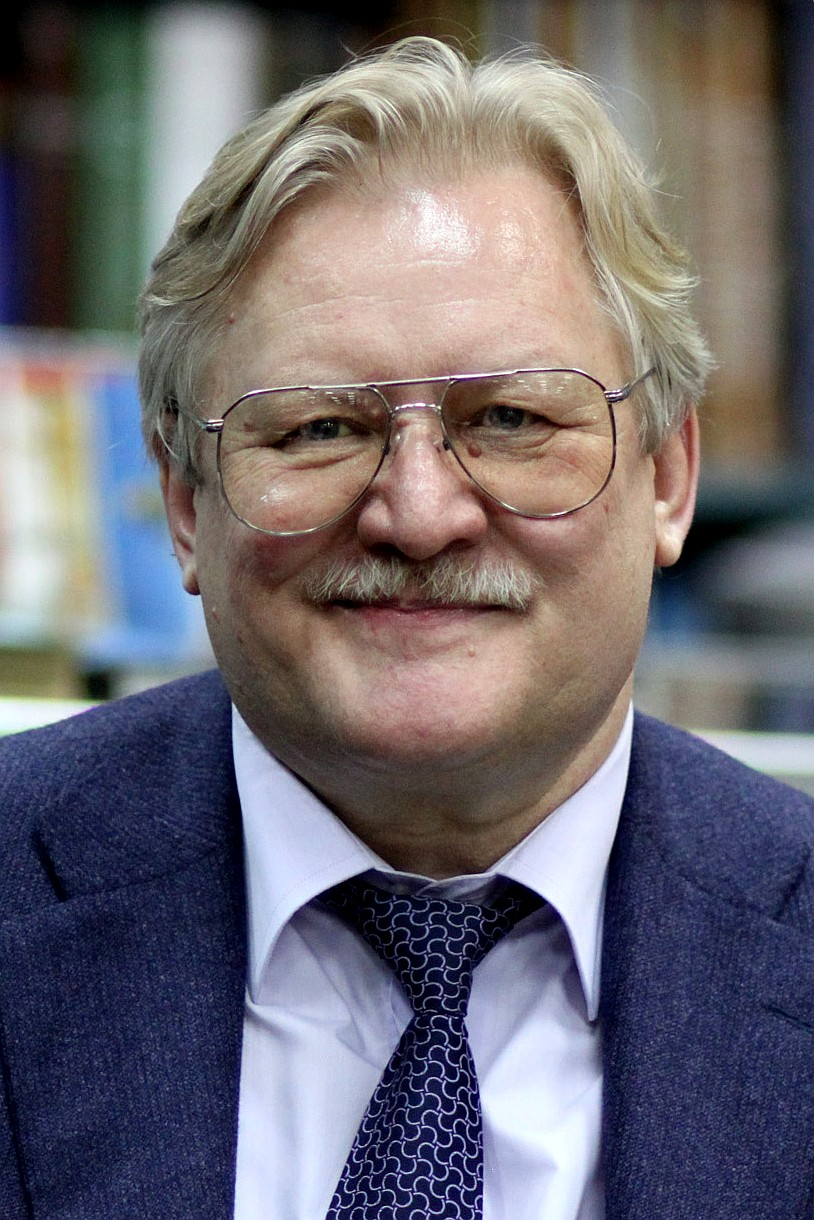
- Kara in 2011
- Born: Yuri Viktorovich Kara; 12 November 1954; Stalino, Ukrainian SSR, USSR
- Died: 16 July 2025 (aged 70); Yalta, Crimea
- Occupations: Film director; screenwriter; producer
- Years active: 1982–2015

Yuri Viktorovich Kara (Russian: Юрий Викторович Кара; 12 November 1954 – 16 July 2025) was a Russian film director, screenwriter and producer.

== Life and career ==
Yuri Kara was born on 12 November 1954 in Stalino, Ukrainian SSR, USSR, which is now called Donetsk.

After graduating from high school No.17 in Donetsk in 1972, Yuri Kara entered the Physics and Chemistry department of the Moscow Institute of Steel and Alloys (MISA). During his studies, he was the head of the institute's vocal and instrumental ensemble. In 1978, he graduated from the MISA with a degree in physics of metals. He then worked as a radio physics engineer in Donetsk.

In 1982, he entered the Gerasimov Institute of Cinematography, where he worked with film director Sergei Gerasimov and actress Tamara Makarova. He graduated in 1987 with a thesis film Tomorrow Was the War based on the story written by the Russian author Boris Vasilyev. The picture was sold in 48 countries.

Yuri Kara became known in Russia with his movies Barons of Crime (1988) and The Feasts of Belshazzar, or a Night with Stalin (1990), and with his conflict with the Russian Federal Space Agency (Roskosmos) which was caused by his film Korolev, based on the novel Cassandra's Brand written by the Russian author Chinghiz Aitmatov. Roskosmos did not allow that actor Vladimir Steklov would really go into space for the film.

In 1994, Yuri Kara became internationally known for the controversies surrounding his film The Master and Margarita. Although the film was made in 1994, it was only premiered in the Russian cinemas on 7 April 2011. Despite the highest budget ever spent on a Russian film and the impressive cast with the most famous Russian actors, the producers decided not to release it. According to them, Yuri Kara's director's cut was unacceptable. Nevertheless, the soundtrack composed by Alfred Schnittke was released on CD. On 15 November 2010, the Russian film distributor Luxor announced out of the blue that they had bought the rights on Kara's film, and that it would be released in March 2011. Eventually, it would be 7 April 2011.

Kara continued making big budget films like Korolev (2007), Reporters (2008; video) and Hamlet. XXI Century (2010).

Kara died in Yalta on 16 July 2025, at the age of 70. The cause of death was a massive heart attack.

== Political position ==
Yuri Kara signed the petition of support of Putin's actions in Ukraine and Crimea in 2014.

He called for the Russian government to officially recognize the Donetsk People's Republic (he was a native of Donetsk).

== Filmography ==
- 1986 – Two on a Bench
- 1987 – Tomorrow Was the War
- 1988 – Barons of Crime
- 1989 – The Feast of Belshazzar, or a Night with Stalin
- 1994 – The Master and Margarita
- 2001 – I'm a Doll
- 2002 – King of the Cage
- 2002 – Interesting Men
- 2005 – The Star of an Epoch (Loving you is like a Disaster)
- 2007 – Korolev
- 2008 – Reporters
- 2009 – Hamlet. XXI Century
- 2015 – Main
