= Alexander Kaidanovsky =

Soviet/Russian actor and director (1946–1995)

- Alexander Kaidanovsky in 1980
- Born: Alexander Leonidovich Kaidanovsky; 23 July 1946; Rostov-on-Don, Russian SFSR, Soviet Union
- Died: 2 December 1995 (aged 49); Moscow, Russia
- Occupations: actor, film director, screenwriter
- Years active: 1965–1995

Alexander Leonidovich Kaidanovsky (Russian: Алекса́ндр Леони́дович Кайдано́вский; 23 July 1946 — 2 December 1995) was a Soviet and Russian actor and film director.

His best known roles are in films such as Stalker (1979), At Home Among Strangers (1974), and The Bodyguard (1979).

Prior to pursuing an acting career, Kaidanovsky attended technical college where he trained to become a welder. In 1965 he started studying acting at The Rostov Theatre School and the Shchukin theatrical school in Moscow. Before completing the course he took his first part in the film The Mysterious Wall (1967) and upon graduation in 1969, he worked as stage actor, making his debut at the Vakhtangov Theatre in 1969. In 1971, he was invited to join the prestigious Moscow Arts Theatre, a rare privilege for a 25-year-old graduate.

He made his major film debut in At Home Among Strangers (1974), and over the next few years appeared in some two dozen films, including the satirical comedy Diamonds for Dictatorship of the Proletariat (1976) and The Life of Beethoven (1980). At his peak in the 70's Kaidanovsky was among Soviet Russia's most popular actors, and it was at this point that famed Soviet director Andrei Tarkovsky, impressed by the looks and the acting technique of Kaidanovsky in Diamonds, invited him to play the title role in his new film, Stalker (1979). The role earned Kaidanovsky international acclaim.

In 1985 he directed A Simple Death, which was screened in the Un Certain Regard section at the 1987 Cannes Film Festival. In 1993 he directed Just Death, which was about the death of Leo Tolstoy.

== Selected filmography ==
- Anna Karenina (1967) as Jules Lando
- The Mysterious Wall (1967) as Someone
- Red Square (1970) as Kashchei
- The Hound of the Baskervilles (1971) as Stapleton
- Investigation Held by ZnaToKi (1972, TV) as Mirkin
- The Fourth (1972) as navigating officer
- Failure of Engineer Garin (1973, TV Mini-Series) as Wolf
- At Home Among Strangers (1974) as Lemke, rittmeister
- The Lost Expedition (1975) as Zimin
- Diamonds for the Dictatorship of the Proletariat (1975) as Vorontsov
- Inquest of Pilot Pirx (1979) as Tom Nowak
- Stalker (1979) as Stalker
- Telokhranitel (1979) as Bodyguard
- The Lifeguard (1980) as Varaksin
- Rafferty (1980, TV Movie) as prosecutor Ames
- Story of an Unknown Man (1980) as Stepan
- Faktas (1981) as Stanislav
- Atsiprasau (1982) as Pranas
- Khareba da Gogia (1987) as Volkhovski
- And Then There Were None (1987) as Captain Philip Lombard
- New Adventures of a Yankee in King Arthur's Court (1988) as Sir Lancelot
- Kerosene Salesman's Wife (1988) as Vasily Petrovich (voice)
- Songlines | Segment: For a Million (1989, director)
- Just Death (1993, director)
- Magic Hunter (1994) as Maxim
