= List of Russian films of 2000 =

A list of films produced in Russia in 2000 (see 2000 in film).

== 2000 ==
Title	Russian title	Director	Cast	Genre	Notes
24 Hours	24 часа	Aleksandr Atanesyan	Maksim Sukhanov, Andrey Panin	Crime	
Brother 2	Брат 2	Aleksei Balabanov	Sergei Bodrov, Jr., Viktor Sukhorukov, Sergei Makovetsky	Crime	
The Captain's Daughter	Русский бунт	Aleksandr Proshkin	Mateusz Damiecki, Karolina Gruszka	Drama	
Chivalric Romance	Рыцарский роман	Aleksandr Inshakov	Sergey Bezrukov, Irina Bezrukova, Aleksandr Inshakov, Vasili Lanovoy	Adventure	
The Christmas Miracle	Рождественская мистерия	Yuriy Feting, Andrei Kravchuk	Aleksei Kravchenko, Chulpan Khamatova	Romantic drama	
Demobbed	ДМБ	Roman Kachanov	Juozas Budraitis, Viktor Pavlov, Aleksandr Dedyushko, Vladimir Shainsky	Comedy	
The Garden Was Full of Moon	Луной был полон сад	Vitali Melnikov	Zinaida Sharko	Romance	Entered into the 22nd Moscow International Film Festival
His Wife's Diary	Дневник его жены	Alexei Uchitel	Andrei Smirnov	Historical drama	
Home Alone	Один дома	Sergei Ryabov		Animation	
House for the Rich	Дом для богатых	Vladimir Fokin	Valentin Gaft, Vladimir Eremin, Konstantin Khabensky	Drama	
The Mark of Cain	Каинова печать	Alix Lambert		Documentary	
The New Bremen Town Musicians	Новые бременские	Alexander Gorlenko	Sergei Penkin, Grigoriy Mamikonov, Gennady Gladkov, Sergey Mazaev	Animation	
Old Hags	Старые клячи	Eldar Ryazanov	Liya Akhedzhakova, Lyudmila Gurchenko, Svetlana Kryuchkova, Irina Kupchenko	Comedy	
Peculiarities of the National Hunt in Winter Season	Особенности национальной охоты в зимний период	Aleksandr Rogozhkin	Alexey Buldakov, Viktor Bychkov	Comedy	
The Romanovs: A Crowned Family	Романовы. Венценосная семья	Gleb Panfilov	Aleksandr Galibin, Lynda Bellingham, Yuliya Novikova, Kseniya Kachalina	Historical	
Silver Lily of the Valley	Ландыш серебристый	Tigran Keosayan	Olesya Zheleznyak, Yuri Stoyanov	Comedy	
The Wedding	Свадьба	Pavel Lungin	Marat Basharov, Maria Mironova, Andrei Panin	Comedy	Entered into the 2000 Cannes Film Festival
Still Waters	Тихие омуты	Eldar Ryazanov	Alexander Abdulov, Lyubov Polishchuk, Andrey Makarevich, Oksana Korostishevskaya, Olga Volkova	Romantic comedy	
Tender Age	Нежный возраст	Sergei Solovyov	Dmitri Solovyov	Drama	

== See also ==
- 2000 in Russia
