= The Crimean Bridge. Made with Love! =

- Official poster
- Directed by: Tigran Keosayan
- Written by: Margarita Simonyan
- Produced by: David Keosayan; Junona Glotova
- Starring: Aleksey Demidov; Katerina Shpitsa; Artyom Tkachenko
- Cinematography: Igor Klebanov
- Music by: Sergei Trofimov
- Production company: 8 Rows Film Studio
- Distributed by: Central Partnership
- Release date: 1 November 2018
- Running time: 102 minutes
- Country: Russia
- Language: Russian

The Crimean Bridge. Made with Love! (Russian: Крымский мост. Сделано с любовью!, romanized: Krymsky most. Sdelano s lyubovyu!) is a 2018 Russian state-funded film directed by Tigran Keosayan.

== Plot ==
The Crimean Bridge is being built in Kerch, a city in eastern Crimea, during the summer. Two men at the construction site are pursuing an archeology student named Varya: Viktor, a PR man from Moscow who arrives in a white convertible with an American television crew, and Dima, a young and ambitious builder. Meanwhile, Bernard is trying to accomplish his dream of marrying an American and going to Hollywood.

== Cast ==
- Aleksey Demidov as Dima
- Katerina Shpitsa as Varya
- Artyom Tkachenko as Viktor Felixovich Onegin, PR man
- Sergei Nikonenko as Talib Nazirovich, Crimean Tatar
- Yuri Stoyanov as boss
- Irina Rozanova as Lara
- Sergey Gazarov as Ashot
- Sofya Zayka as Marina
- Laura Keosayan as Nika, Bernard's ex-girlfriend
- Larisa Malevannaya as Raisa
- Aleksandr Dmitriev as Tikhon
- Alyona Khmelnitskaya as Tikhon's mother
- Aleksandr Ilyin Sr. as Mikhalych
- Dmitry Kartashov as Bernard
- Yelena Myravyova as Rachel
- Yegor Bakulin as Max
- Kristina Kucherenko as Aliya
- Valentin Samokhin as Oliver Stone

== Production ==
Filming took place in the Kerch Strait and on the island of Tuzla on a construction site where the supports and metal spans of the Crimean bridge were being installed. Actors worked close to engineers, installers and welders. Some scenes were filmed alongside residents of the Crimea and the Kuban.

== Reception ==
The film attracted scathing reviews, and is even the lowest-rated film on several film review aggregators. Russian opposition politician Alexei Navalny released a video in March 2020, alleging serious corruption during the production of the film, with at least 46 million rubles in state funds intended for film production being siphoned off to Simonyan's relatives. It flopped at the box office, recovering only 70 million rubles, less than half of its 154 million ruble budget.

Cinemas in Kazakhstan refused to screen this film, citing no interest from local movie-goers.
