= Georgy Martirosyan (actor) =

Soviet and Russian actor

- Born: Georgy Khachaturovich Martirosyan; 31 January 1948 (age 78); Rostov-on-Don, USSR
- Occupation: actor
- Years active: 1974—present
- Spouse: Tatyana Vasilyeva (divorce)
- Awards: Honored Artist of the Russian Federation (2004)

Georgy Khachaturovich Martirosyan (Russian: Гео́ргий Хачату́рович Мартиросьян; January 31, 1948, Rostov-on-Don) is a Soviet and Russian film, stage and voice actor, Honored Artist of the Russian Federation (2004).

== Selected filmography ==
- The Lost Expedition (1975) as Tikhon
- D'Artagnan and Three Musketeers (1978) as cardinal's guardsman
- There Was a Piano-Tuner... (1979) as Slavik
- Pirates of the 20th Century (1980) as Klyuev
- The Suicide Club, or the Adventures of a Titled Person (1981) as servant
- Along Unknown Paths (1982) as hero
- The Treasures of Agra (1983) as King of Bohemia
- TASS Is Authorized to Declare... (1984) as KGB officer
- Charlotte’s Necklace (1984) as Sedov
- The Most Charming and Attractive (1985) as customer in a restaurant
- Aelita, Do Not Pester Men! (1988) as companion
- Genius (1991) as Mormon
- Love in Russian (1995) as Gavrilov
- Poor Sasha (1997) as Colonel
- Schizophrenia (1997) as the shot general
- Voroshilov Sharpshooter (1999) as prosecutor
- The President and His Granddaughter (2000) as salon director
- Silver Lily of the Valley (2000) as pilot
- My Fair Nanny (2004) as Boris Shtorm
- I'm Staying (2007) as singer Yuri Zatonsky
- Election Day (2007) as singer
- Radio Day (2008) as Sasha's uncle
- Voronin's Family (2018) as Valery Olegovich Nesterov
