= Margarita Simonyan =

Russian media executive (born 1980)

- Маргарита Симоньян
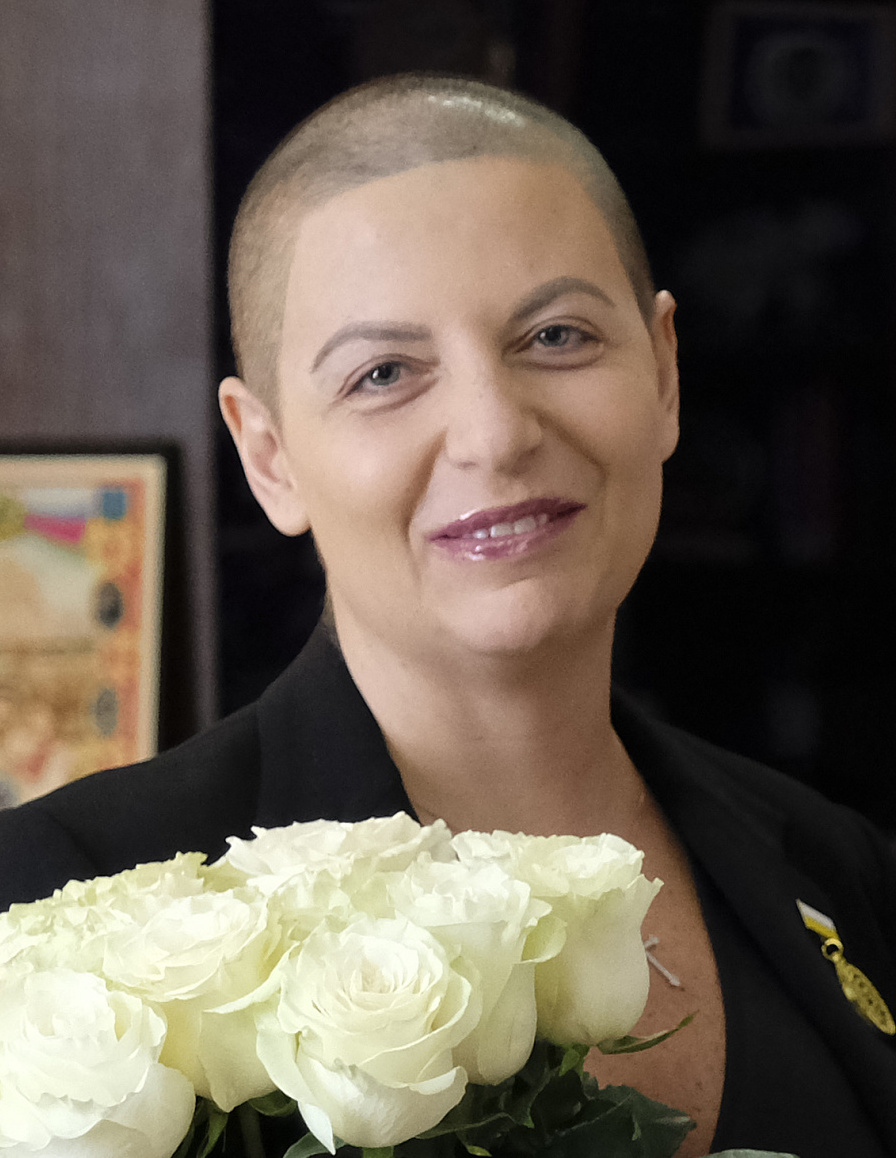
- Simonyan in February 2026
- Born: Margarita Simonovna Simonyan; 6 April 1980 (age 46); Krasnodar, Russian SFSR, Soviet Union
- Education: Kuban State University
- Occupation: Editor-in-chief
- Years active: 1999–present
- Spouse: Tigran Keosayan (m. 2022; died 2025)
- Children: 4
- Margarita Simonyan's voice Recorded 18 November 2013

Margarita Simonovna Simonyan (Note: Russian: Маргарита Симоновна Симоньян Armenian: Մարգարիտա Սիմոնի Սիմոնյան, romanized: Margarita Simoni Simonyan) (born 6 April 1980) is a Russian media executive and propagandist. She is the editor-in-chief of the Russian broadcaster RT, as well as the media group Rossiya Segodnya.

Simonyan covered the Second Chechen War in the 2000s while working as a journalist. Subsequently, she worked at Krasnodar television, was VGTRK's own correspondent in Rostov-on-Don, and worked as a special correspondent for the Vesti TV news program. She is a member of the board of directors of Channel One Russia and a member of the Academy of Russian Television. At the age of 25, she was appointed head of Russia Today, now known as RT.

In 2022 and 2023, Simonyan was sanctioned by the European Union as "a central figure of the Russian Government propaganda". She was sanctioned by the United Kingdom and Ukraine in relation to the Russian invasion of Ukraine. In 2024, she was sanctioned by the United States for alleged interference in the 2024 United States elections. Simonyan is the widow of film director and actor, Tigran Keosayan.

The Financial Times placed her in its list of the most influential people of 2025 in the Leaders category. It described her as "Putin’s most devoted envoy” and a “Valkyrie of propaganda".

== Early life, family and education ==
Simonyan was born in the southern Russian city of Krasnodar, into an Armenian family. Both her parents are descendants of Armenian refugees from the Ottoman Empire. Her father's family, originally from Trabzon, settled in Crimea during the Armenian genocide of 1915. During World War II, they were deported by Stalin's NKVD secret police to the Urals along with thousands of other Hamshen Armenians. Her father was born in Yekaterinburg (Sverdlovsk). Her mother was born in Sochi to an Armenian family that had fled the massacres of the Armenians by the Turks in the late 19th century. Her two grandfathers were World War II veterans. Simonyan has described herself as both Armenian and Russian.

Her family owns a restaurant in the town of Moldovka in Adlersky City District, Sochi. Simonyan has stated that she is from a working-class family and decided at an early age that she wanted to become a journalist, first working for the local newspaper, and then for a local television station while studying journalism at Kuban State University.

She spent a year as an exchange student in Bristol, New Hampshire, in 1995 under the FLEX Program (Future Leaders Exchange Program).

== Career ==
Simonyan, as a correspondent, covered the Second Chechen War, and also serious flooding of the Krasnodar region, for her local television station, receiving an award for "professional courage". In 2002, she became a regional correspondent for Russia's national Rossiya television channel and covered the 2004 Beslan school hostage crisis. Simonyan, one of the first correspondents to arrive at the scene, witnessed the killing of 334 people, 186 of them children. She told an interviewer "It was the worst thing that ever happened to me," and that she 'cried frequently' while trying to write about it. She then moved to Moscow where she joined the Russian pool of Kremlin reporters.

She was the first vice-president of the Russian National Association of TV and Radio Broadcasters and a member of the Civic Chamber of the Russian Federation. In 2010, her first book, Heading to Moscow! was published.

In 2018, Simonyan wrote the script for The Crimean Bridge. Made with Love!, a film directed by her husband, Keosayan. The film attracted scathing reviews, and was the lowest-rated film on several film review aggregators, with Simonyan's script widely panned. Russian opposition politician Alexei Navalny released a video in March 2020, alleging serious corruption during the production of the film, with state funds intended for film production being siphoned off to Simonyan's relatives.

=== Editor-in-chief of RT and Rossiya Segodnya ===
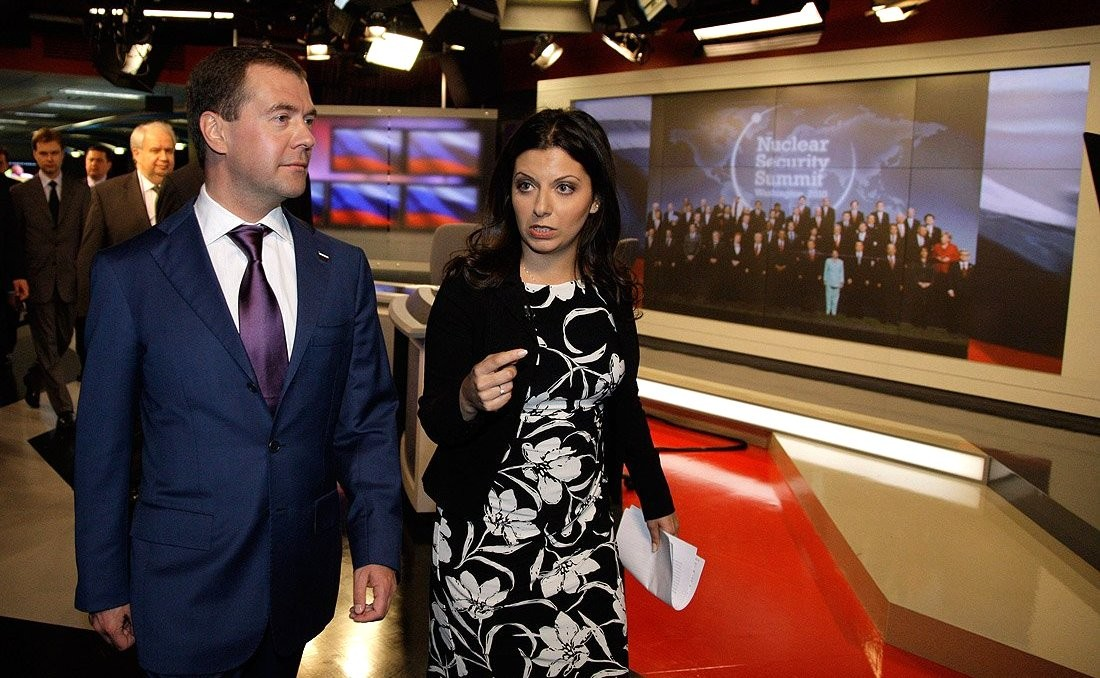
Russian President Dmitry Medvedev visits RT offices with Editor-in-Chief Margarita Simonyan in April 2010

Simonyan was only 25 when appointed editor-in-chief of RT (then known as Russia Today) in 2005, but had been working in journalism since she was 18. She stated in a 2008 interview that "her age often leads people to make assumptions about how she got her job." Andrei Richter, the director of the Moscow Media Law and Policy Institute and a journalism professor at Moscow State University, suggests that she was "appointed because she is well-connected." She is a Kremlin loyalist who is close to President Vladimir Putin.

RT began broadcasting on 10 December 2005 with a staff of 300 journalists, including approximately 70 from outside Russia. Simonyan frequently addresses media questions about RT's journalistic and political stance. At its launch, Simonyan stated that RT's intent was to have a "professional format" like the BBC, CNN and Euronews that would "reflect Russia's opinion of the world" and present a "more balanced picture" of Russia. She told a reporter that the government would not dictate content and that "Censorship by government in this country is prohibited by the constitution."

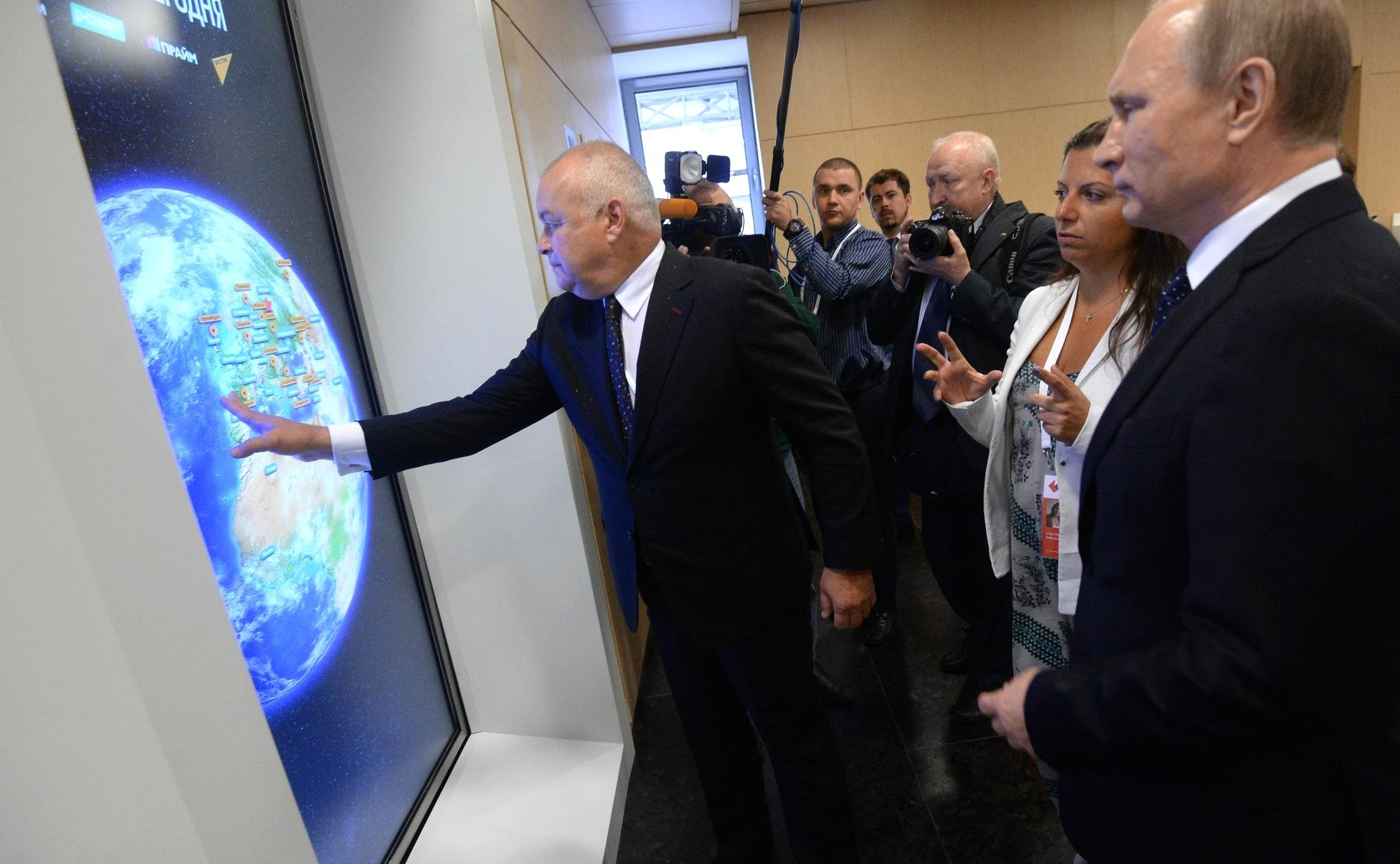
Simonyan with Russian President Vladimir Putin and television presenter Dmitry Kiselyov in June 2016

She later told The Moscow Times that RT started to grow once it became provocative and that controversy was vital to the station. She said that RT's task was not to polish Moscow's reputation. The station has however been criticised repeatedly in the West for perceived bias. Simonyan has been quoted as saying: "There is no objectivity – only approximations of the truth by as many different voices as possible".

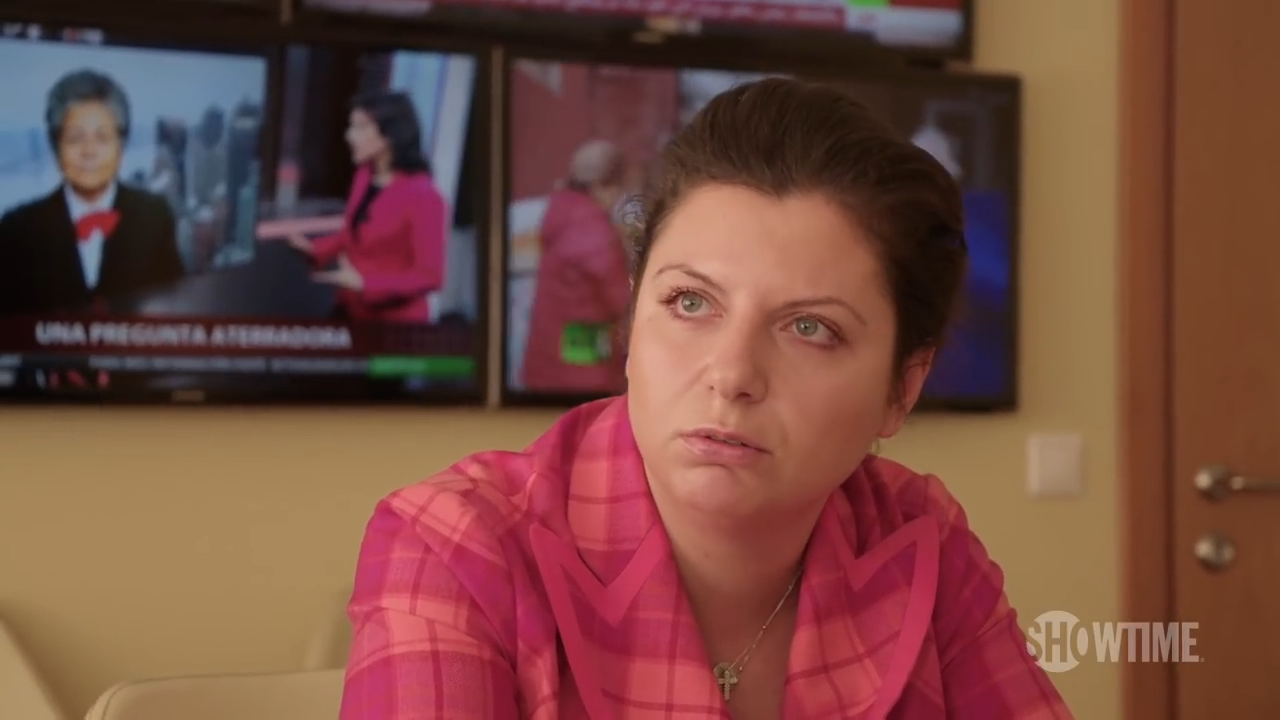
Simonyan on Showtime during a talk with journalists Mark McKinnon, John Heilemann and Alex Wagner in April 2018

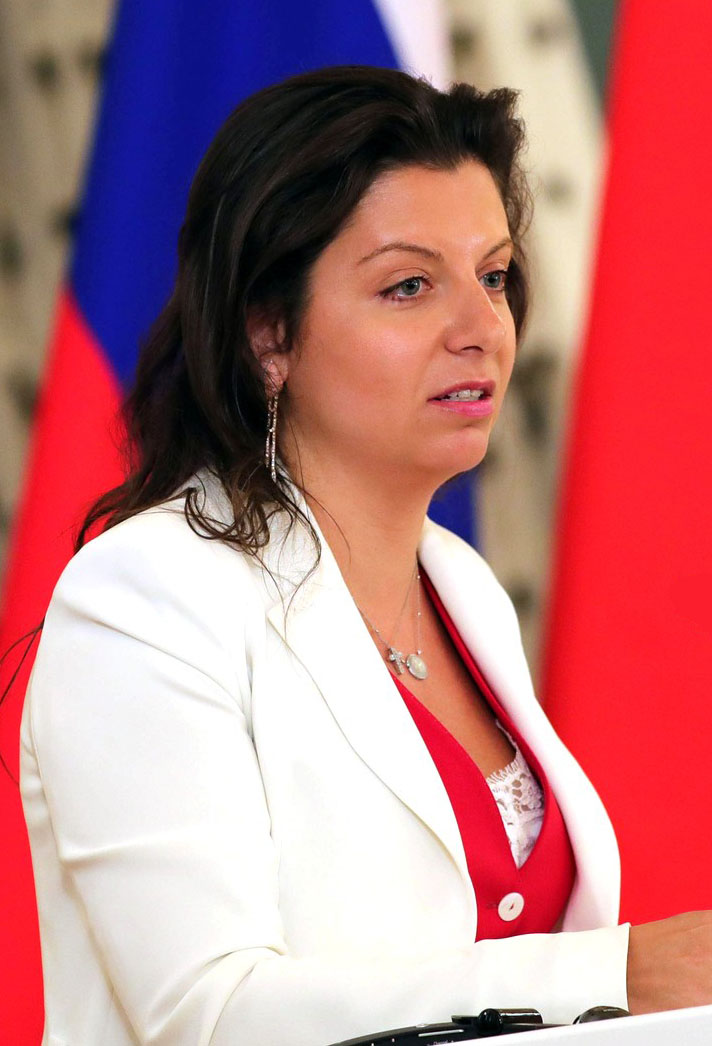
Simonyan in 2017

In an interview with The Washington Times, she discussed RT's coverage of the 2008 South Ossetia war, in which Russia supported South Ossetia against Georgia. She stated that among English speaking channels, only RT was giving the South Ossetian side of the story. She rejected former RT correspondent Will Dunbar's allegations that RT was downplaying Russian bombing raids and applied censorship. She stated that compared to some other stations, "We are not making a secret out of the fact that we are a Russian station, and, of course, we see the world from a Russian point of view. We are being much more honest in that sense."

On 31 December 2013, she was cross-appointed as the editor-in-chief of the new government owned news agency Rossiya Segodnya and serves as editor-in-chief of both organizations concurrently. In May 2016, after she was included in the sanctions list of Ukraine by President Petro Poroshenko, she was denied entry to Ukraine.

In April 2022, Simonyan proposed removing the article on the prohibition of censorship from the 1993 Russian Constitution. According to her, freedom of speech will lead to "the collapse" of Russia. She called for emulating the People's Republic of China, which is a "non-free but prosperous country".

==== Racist segment about Barack Obama ====
On 30 November 2020, Simonyan defended an NTV satirical segment that was roundly criticized as racist, which contained Simonyan's partner, Tigran Keosayan, and an actress in blackface posing as former United States President Barack Obama. In the segment, Keosayan, referring to Obama's book A Promised Land, asks: "Do you consider this book your achievement?", to which the actress in blackface replies: "Of course." Keosayan then asks: "Because none of your relatives have written books?", after which the actress answers: "Because none of my relatives that came before me could write." Keosayan then states "you should have been a rap musician, not the president".

==== 2022 Russian invasion of Ukraine ====
Speaking on Russian State television in April 2021, Simonyan said that in a 'full-scale war', Russia would defeat Ukraine 'in 2 days'. In December 2021, Simonyan stated in a TV debate that the war in Donbas "is ongoing and if a small war can stop this butchery that's gone on for seven years perhaps it's a way out." On 15 February 2022, Simonyan rejected speculation that Russia was preparing for a full-scale invasion of Ukraine. In mid-February 2022, she stated that "Russia cannot but stop this war. What are we waiting for?"

On 23 February 2022, Simonyan was included in the European Union sanctions list for promoting "a positive attitude to the annexation of Crimea and the actions of separatists in Donbas." She is barred from entering EU countries and any assets she owns in them are frozen.

After the Russian invasion of Ukraine began on 24 February 2022, Simonyan expressed support for the invasion, including posting a Tweet saying that "This is a standard parade rehearsal, It's just that this year we decided to hold the parade in Kyiv," and mocking speculation that she would be targeted with further sanctions. She opposed the 2022 anti-war protests in Russia, stating that "If you are ashamed of being Russian now, don't worry, you are not Russian." She claimed that "Nobody is fighting against Ukrainians! We're liberating Ukraine! No one is bombing peaceful Ukrainian cities!"

On Your Own Truth, presented by Roman Babayan on NTV on 26 March, Simonyan made multiple unsupported assertions, including a claim that Ukrainian doctors have called for Russian prisoners to be castrated and Ukrainian "Nazis" are "prepared to pluck children's eyes out based on their ethnicity." She also claimed that Ukrainian forces were attacking children in Mariupol with banned cluster munition. On 26 March, she said that to her "horror," a "considerable portion of the Ukrainian people have turned out to be engulfed in the madness of nazism."

She said that Russia was at war with NATO. On 26 April, while discussing the possibility of World War III and nuclear war with Vladimir Solovyov on The Evening with Vladimir Solovyov, Simonyan said, "Personally, I think that the most realistic way is the way of World War III, based on knowing us and our leader Vladimir Vladimirovich Putin, knowing how everything works around here, it's impossible—there is no chance—that we will give up ... We're all going to die someday." Igor Albin, former Vice Governor of Saint Petersburg, wrote on his Telegram channel: "Crazy 'propagandists' will burn in hell. You don't scold your own in times of war, but you shouldn't be proud of them either. There will be no winners in a nuclear war!"

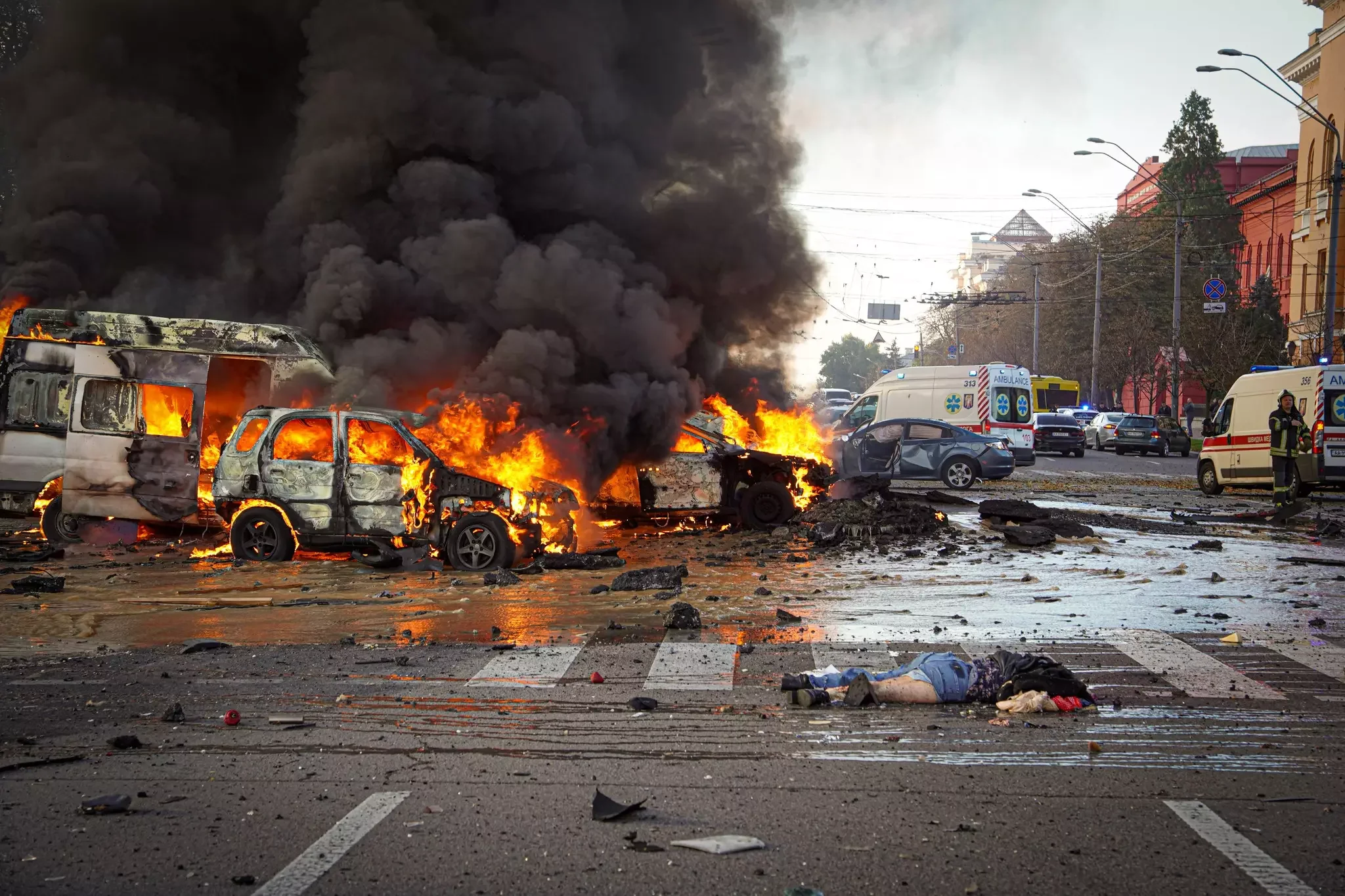
Streets of Kyiv following Russian missile strikes on 10 October 2022. Simonyan called for retaliatory strikes on Ukrainian cities.

She suggested that Russia should "disable" Ukrainian nuclear power plants.

She asked Kazakh President Kassym-Jomart Tokayev about Kazakhstan's position on the "special military operation" in Ukraine. He replied that "we recognize neither Taiwan, nor Kosovo, nor South Ossetia and Abkhazia. In all likelihood, this principle will be applied to quasi-state entities, which, in our opinion, are Luhansk and Donetsk." Simonyan believes that the 2022 food crisis, partly caused by Russia's invasion of Ukraine, will force the West to lift sanctions.

Pointing to chaotic partial mobilization and reports of old, disabled or otherwise unfit men being drafted into the army, Simonyan complained why the "millions of security officers and guards" who are being used in Russia are not sent to the front. She also complained that some recruits were receiving inadequate equipment.

On 17 March 2023, in response to the ICC issuing a warrant for Putin, Simonyan posted on Twitter saying that "I’d like to see a country that would arrest Putin under the ruling of The Hague. In about eight minutes, or whatever the [missile] flight time to its capital."

On 2 October 2023, on her own internet show, she said that Russia could produce a nuclear explosion "somewhere over Siberia" which she believed would have no adverse results on the ground and would act as a "nuclear ultimatum" to the West. She said the explosion would kill off all electronics and satellites, and return Russia to a gadget-free time like 1993 in which "we lived wonderfully". Simonyan was strongly criticised by a number of Siberian politicians, and the Russian government distanced itself from her comments. In response to the criticism, Simonyan backtracked, and said she had not suggested a nuclear strike on Russian territory. There were calls from Russian politicians for Simonyan to either apologise, or face criminal proceedings for her words, and she was called a "stupid woman with no understanding of such things" in the Russian parliament.

On 19 October 2023, Simonyan criticized Israel's airstrikes in the Gaza Strip during the Gaza war, saying that the "one who answers barbarity with barbarity is a barbarian." She praised the war for diverting the West's attention from Ukraine and warned that "the world is on the brink of World War III."

On 1 March 2024, she posted the German Taurus leak on Russian social media, the recording of an intercepted web conference between top German air force officers discussing the possible supply of German Taurus cruise missiles to Ukraine along with operational scenarios in the Russian-Ukrainian War.

In 2026 she published the novel "In the beginning was the Word - in the end there will be the Number". It was short-listed for the Big Book award, Russia's most prestigious literary prize. Over 170,000 copies of Simonyan's book have been sold. There were accusations of plagiarism as a book with the same title and similar content was published in 2019 by Russian economist and conspiracy theorist Valentin Katasonov.

=== Sanctions ===
Simonyan was sanctioned by the UK government in 2022 in relation to the Russo-Ukrainian War.

In 2022, Simonyan was sanctioned by the European Union as "a central figure of the Russian Government propaganda" responsible for "actions and policies which undermine the territorial integrity, sovereignty and independence of Ukraine".

In January 2023, Ukraine imposed sanctions on Simonyan for her support of 2022 Russian invasion of Ukraine.

in September 2024, she was sanctioned by the US, along with RT, for interference in the 2024 elections.

=== Comments about Armenia ===
During the 2020 Armenian–Azerbaijani war, Simonyan accused the Armenian authorities of provoking Russia by arresting former-president Robert Kocharyan and refusing to recognize the annexation of Crimea. She suggested that the CSTO's response was appropriate given Armenia's "anti-Russian sentiment." The CSTO later stated: "The opinion of [Simonyan] is completely contrary to the official position of the CSTO Secretariat." Her words were widely criticized in Armenian society.

She said, "Any Armenian who dares to criticize Russia should go and cut out his dirty tongue. They brought the national traitor Nikol Pashinyan to power, who created the prerequisite for war." Political commentator Sergey Parkhomenko also criticized her, saying that Simonyan is posing as "a powerful representative of the Armenian people, while not being such at all from any point of view."

In October 2022, Simonyan stated that she was banned by Armenian authorities from entering the country.

=== Assassination attempt ===
In July 2023, Russia's Federal Security Service arrested members of a neo-Nazi organisation who were preparing an attempt to assassinate Simonyan. The investigation into the plot was completed in October 2025. The accused had been offered $50,000 to carry out the assassination.

== Bobroedka ==
Bobroedka (Russian: Боброедка, lit. 'beaver-eater') is a pejorative nickname for Simonyan, which has become an internet meme in Russia and the post-Soviet countries. This nickname was given to Simonyan when, at the end of 2012, apparently in honor of the New Year 2013, Simonyan decided to try beaver meat. Simonyan told her subscribers on social media: "For the first time in my life I will cook beaver. Interviewed experts. As a result, I will cook a beaver's head with onions, carrots and lavrushka [bay leaf] for broth. The rest of the meat will be marinated overnight in garlic, juniper berries and black pepper, tomorrow I will fry and therefore I will stew in broth until soft". Users found such tastes specific, since the beaver is a non-common animal for eating.

After that, the nickname "bobroedka", which literally means "beaver-eater", became firmly attached to Simonyan. The nickname has a negative connotation and is used disparagingly against Simonyan, to insult or troll. Many memes have been made on the "bobroedka" theme, commonly combining images of Margarita and beaver. Simonyan responded to the public reaction by joking that she would next cook hamsters, which fuelled more public interest in her culinary tastes. The nickname was often used by opposition leader Alexei Navalny, with whom Simonyan had a long-running conflict, and his supporters. After Simonyan's first post about consuming a beaver, Navalny published a photo of a beaver on his social media, with the caption: "Most recently, he was eating grass and enjoying life. And tomorrow Margarita Simonyan will devour him with vodka". Navalny and Simonyan would frequently clash over the years, with Navalny regularly bringing up the "bobroedka" theme. In April 2021, Simonyan sent beaver meat to the prison colony where Navalny was being held. She wrote "Navalny is on a hunger strike. Just in time, I sent him a yummy package," posting photos of packages of beaver sausage and its smoked meat on social networks. Simonyan's act caused sharp criticism on social media.

Simonyan herself does not like her nickname, and has complained on her social media when she has been referred to as "bobroedka" in the media. She sometimes uses the nickname in her social media posts, but regards it as hopelessly outdated.

== Personal life ==
Simonyan is fluent in Russian and English. She stated in a 2012 interview that she regrets not knowing Armenian, but explained that it is because her family never spoke Armenian at home due to dialectal differences.

Simonyan was formerly married to the journalist and producer Andrey Blagodyrenko, giving birth to the couple's daughter, Mariana, in August 2013. She was also married to Russian-Armenian film director, Tigran Keosayan, with whom she regularly collaborated. They had three children together. On 26 September 2025, after being in coma for nine months, Keosayan died without regaining consciousness.

On 15 July 2023, TASS wrote that seven people were arrested in connection with an alleged plot to kill Simonyan and Ksenia Sobchak, a journalist and television host.

On 7 September 2025, she revealed to have been diagnosed with a "severe and scary illness", keeping the exact diagnosis private, and announced that a surgery will be performed next day on her chest and breast, alluding to breast cancer.

== Awards and honors ==
- Ranked fifth in Forbes' 2017 list of Most Powerful Women In Media/Entertainment.

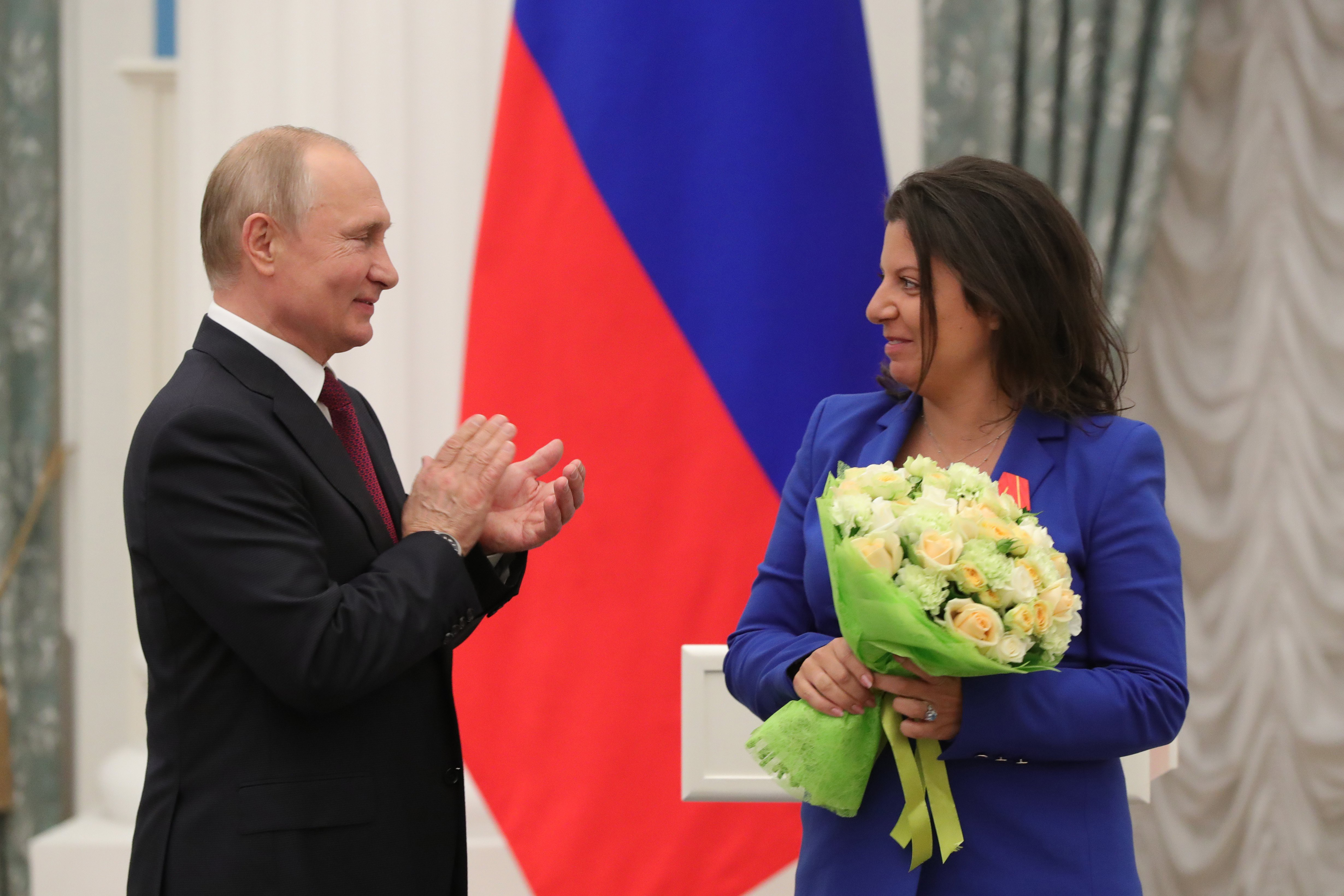
Vladimir Putin awards Simonyan with an Order of Alexander Nevsky in May 2019

- Russia:
  - Medal "For Strengthening the Combat Commonwealth" (2005)
  - Order of Friendship (2007)
  - Gratitude of the President of the Russian Federation (2010)
  - Order For Merit to the Fatherland, 4th class (2014)
  - Order of Alexander Nevsky (2019)
- Armenia:
  - Movses Khorenatsi Medal (2010)
- South Ossetia:
  - Order of Friendship (2008)
- The Financial Times placed her in its list of the most influential people of 2025 in the Leaders category.

== See also ==
- Mikhail Lesin
- Russian information war against Ukraine
