= Dedovsk (inhabited locality) =

Dedovsk (Russian: Дедовск) is the name of several inhabited localities in Russia.

Urban localities

- Dedovsk, a town in Istrinsky District of Moscow Oblast

Rural localities

- Dedovsk, Bryansk Oblast, a village in Dubrovsky Rural Administrative Okrug of Surazhsky District in Bryansk Oblast; 53°16′N 32°33′E
