= Sergey Gazarov =

Russian actor

- Сергей Газаров
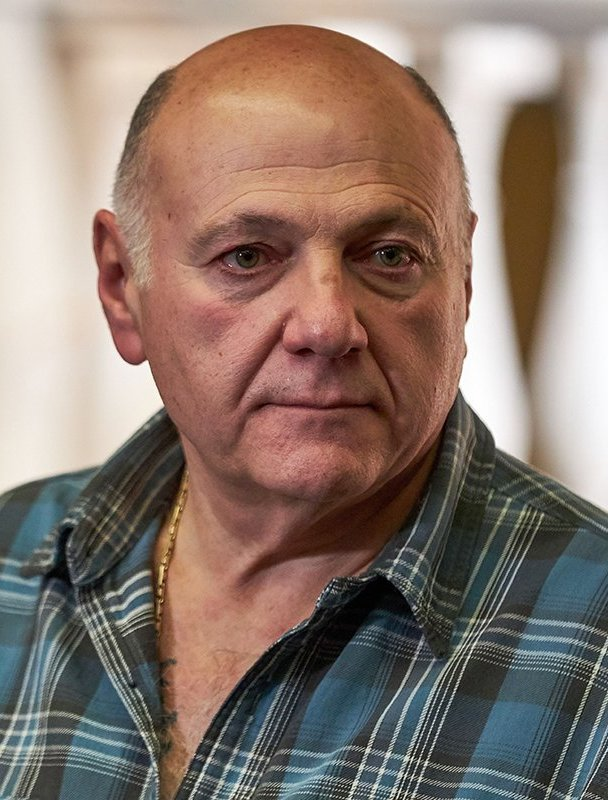
- Gazarov in 2019
- Born: Sergey Ishkhani Gazarov; 13 January 1958 (age 68); Baku, Azerbaijani SSR, Soviet Union
- Citizenship: Soviet Union; Russia
- Occupations: Actor, filmmaker, theatre director, screenwriter, film producer
- Years active: 1980–present
- Awards: Golden Eagle Award (2007)

Sergey Ishkanovich Gazarov (Russian: Сергей Ишханович Газаров, Armenian: Սերգեյ Իշխանի Գազարով, romanized: Sergey Ishkhani Gazarov; born January 13, 1958) is a Russian and former Soviet actor and filmmaker of Armenian origin.

He has been the art director of the Moscow Satire Theatre from 2021 to 2024.

== Biography ==
Gazarov was born in Baku, Soviet Azerbaijan, in an Armenian family.

In 1980, he graduated from the acting department of the Russian Institute of Theatre Arts, where he had been taught by Oleg Tabakov. After graduating, Gazarov joined the Sovremennik Theatre. In 1991, he put up a play based on The Government Inspector by Nikolai Gogol. In the same year, Gazarov was awarded the Russia's Union of Theatre Workers prize for his direction.

From 1998 to 2001, he served as head director of the Armen Dzhigarkhanyan Moscow Drama Theatre.

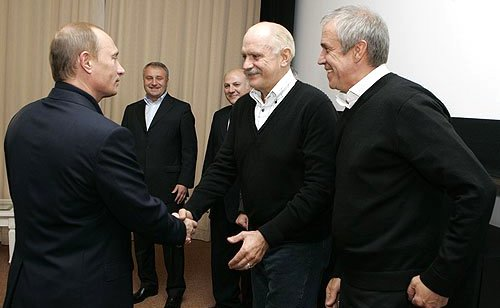
Gazarov and fellow actors Nikita Mikhalkov and Sergey Garmash at a meeting with Russian president Vladimir Putin, 2 November 2007

== Selected filmography ==
=== Actor ===
- Family Relations (1981) as Kirill's guest
- Jaguar (1986) as Lieutenant Gamboa
- The Gambler (1989) as Shota
- Entrance to the Labyrinth (1989) as Omar Sharifovich Ramazanov
- The Executioner (1990) as Igor Pogodin
- Taxi Blues (1990) as the Administrator
- Nikolai Vavilov (1990) as Isaak Prezent
- Deadly Force 5 (2003) as Vazgen/Jean
- My Step Brother Frankenstein (2004) as Edik
- The Turkish Gambit (2005) as Yūsuf Pasha
- Rabbit Over the Void (2006) as the Gipsy baron
- 12 (2007) as the 7th Juror
- The Apocalypse Code (2007) as the oligarch
- Kiss Through a Wall (2011) as Victor Pilsudsky
- The Spy (2011) as Lavrentiy Beria
- August Eighth (2012) as Kirill Ivanovich
- Love Does Not Love (2014) as Mikhail Andreyevich
- Flight Crew (2016) as Pyotr Shestakov
- After You're Gone (2016) as Sergey
- The Crimean Bridge. Made with Love! (2018) as Ashot
- Godunov (2018) as Jeremias II of Constantinople
- AK-47 (2020) as Pavel Krotov
- Raiders of the Lost Library (2022) as Kuchevsky

=== Director ===
- Inspector (1996)
- Empire Under Attack (2000)
