= Inspector (1996 film) =

- Russian: Ревизор
- Directed by: Sergey Gazarov
- Written by: Andrey Dmitriev; Sergey Gazarov
- Based on: The Government Inspector by Nikolai Gogol
- Produced by: Sergey Gazarov; Natalya Petrosova
- Starring: Nikita Mikhalkov; Marina Neyolova; Anna Mikhalkova; Zinoviy Gerdt; Oleg Yankovsky
- Cinematography: Mikhail Agranovich
- Music by: Aleksandr Ayzenshtadt
- Release date: 1996
- Country: Russia
- Language: Russian

Inspector (Russian: Ревизор) is a 1996 Russian comedy film directed by Sergey Gazarov. It is based on the play The Government Inspector by Nikolai Gogol. The film takes place in 19th-century Russia in a small provincial town where corrupt officials rule the roost and which the auditor decides to visit.

== Plot ==
Set in 19th-century Russia, this story unfolds in a provincial town rife with bribery, abuse of power, and embezzlement. One day, the town's mayor, Skvoznik-Dmukhanovsky, gathers local officials to announce that a government inspector is on his way, having received a tip from an old friend. Panicked, the officials rush to tidy up their affairs. Suddenly, they hear that the "inspector" has already arrived and is staying at a local inn. In reality, this "inspector" is a low-level civil servant from St. Petersburg named Khlestakov, who is only passing through and is stranded after losing all his money gambling. Mistaking him for an important government figure, the mayor invites him to inspect the town's institutions, where the officials attempt to impress him with grand banquets and entertainment, later inviting him into their homes. Drunk on the power he accidentally wields, Khlestakov spins elaborate lies, claiming not only to be a high-ranking inspector but also a close friend of Pushkin and nearly a field marshal.

Embracing his role, Khlestakov borrows over 1,000 rubles from the officials under the pretense of a "loan" and begins flirting with both the mayor's wife and daughter. Promising to marry the daughter, he eventually leaves town, sparking a celebration for the supposed engagement. However, the festivities are abruptly interrupted when the postmaster arrives with a letter from Khlestakov that reveals he was deceiving them all along. Moments later, a gendarme arrives with news that the real government inspector has just arrived from St. Petersburg, leaving the mayor and his officials frozen in shock at their mistake.

== Cast ==
- Nikita Mikhalkov as Anton Antonovich Skvoznik-Dmukhanovsky, the mayor
- Marina Neyolova as Anna Andreyevna, his wife
- Anna Mikhalkova as Mariya Antonovna, their daughter
- Zinoviy Gerdt as Luka Lukich Khlopov, the inspector of schools
- Oleg Yankovsky as Ammos Fedorovich Liapkin-Tiapkin, the judge
- Yevgeny Mironov as Khlestakov
- Armen Dzhigarkhanyan as Osip
- Pyotr Merkurev as Khristian Ivanovich Gibner, the district doctor
- Jan Kuzelka as Stepan Ilyich Ukhovertov, the chief of police
- Viktor Terelya as Derzhimorda, a policeman
- Idris Masgutov as The merchant, Abdulin
- Vladimir Ilyin
