= Shirli-myrli =

- Directed by: Vladimir Menshov
- Written by: Vladimir Menshov; Vitaliy Moskalenko; Andrei Samsonov
- Produced by: Vladimir Dostal; Alexander Litvinov
- Starring: Valery Garkalin; Vera Alentova; Inna Churikova; Igor Ugolnikov
- Cinematography: Vadim Alisov
- Music by: Timur Kogan
- Production company: Mosfilm
- Release date: 1995
- Running time: 136 minutes
- Country: Russia
- Language: Russian

Shirli-myrli (Russian: Ширли-мырли, also released as What a Mess!) is a 1995 farce comedy film of the early post-soviet era directed by Vladimir Menshov. Centered around a pursued con man, who steal a huge diamond. The movie, among other things, satirizes chauvinism, antisemitism and other ethnic tensions in 1990s Russia. Valery Garkalin plays multiple roles as identical twins who were raised believing they belonged to different cultures and races, looking down at one another's.

== Plot summary ==
While Russian miners are digging in the diamond mine, Unpromising, in Yakutia, an enormous diamond is found. It is called The Savior of Russia, and officials declare that the sale of the diamond could pay off the national debt, as well as pay for a three-year-long vacation in the Canary Islands for every citizen of the Russian Federation.

While the diamond is being transported to Moscow (by Antonov An-124 Ruslan) it is stolen by crime boss Kozulskiy (Armen Dzhigarkhanyan), who is then robbed by professional thief Vasiliy Krolikov (Valery Garkalin).

For the remainder of the film, the plot revolves around Krolikov, a con man raised as a Russian, and his two other identical multiple birth brothers; one was raised as a Jew to become a world-famous musician, another as a Russian Roma to become a Romani tabor chief and a member of Russian parliament. Krolikov is pursued by Kozulskiy's mafia and two militsiya officers - Captain Jean-Paul Piskunov (Igor Ugolnikov), and an unnamed lieutenant (Sergey Batalov). At the end of the film, it is revealed that there is a fourth brother, raised as an African American (also played by Garkalin), meaning that the brood is actually quadruplets.

== Cast ==
- Valery Garkalin as Vasily Krolikov / Innokentiy Shniperson / Roman Almazov / Patrick Crolikow
- Vera Alentova as Carol Abzats / Zemfira Almazova / Lusiena Krolikova / Whitney Crolikow
- Inna Churikova as Praskoviya Krolikova, Krolikov's supposed mother and the quadruplets's aunt
- Armen Dzhigarkhanyan as Kozyulski, the crime boss nicknamed "Godfather"
- Igor Ugolnikov as Captain Jean-Paul Piskunov, Militsiya special investigator
- Sergey Batalov as the militsiya lieutenant and Piskunov's assistant
- Leonid Kuravlyov as the US Ambassador to Russia
- Lyubov Polishchuk as Jennifer, US Ambassador's wife and collector of Russian folklore
- Oleg Tabakov as Sukhodrishchev, a rowdy drunkard
- Aleksandr Voroshilo as Kozma, Shniperson's admirer
- Nonna Mordyukova as the Female Registry Office official
- Sergei Artsibashev as the Male Registry Office official
- Arkadi Koval as the TV Announcer
- Yevgeni Aleksandrov as the TV journalist (voiced by Sergey Bezrukov)
- Lev Borisov as Alexey Feofilaktovich, a mafioso
- Yuri Chernov as Alexey, the suitcase carrier
- Oleg Yefremov as Nikolay Grigoryevich, the Krolikovs' alcoholic neighbor
- Yevgeni Vesnik as the doctor
- Rolan Bykov as the diamond buyer
- Valeri Nikolayev as the male step dancer
- Irina Apeksimova as the female step dancer
- Viktor Gaynov as Quasimodo, a mafioso
- Aleksandr Pankratov-Chyorny as US Ambassador's bodyguard
- Mikhail Kokshenov as US Ambassador's bodyguard
- Tatyana Kravchenko as Bronislava Rosembaum, the geologist
- Sergei Gabrielyan as Ravil Beliletdinov, the geologist
- Valeri Afanasyev as Anatoly Ivanov, the geologist
- Vladimir Menshov as the President of Russia
- Vsevolod Sanayev as the male music lover
- Nina Alisova as the female music lover
- Vladimir Gusev as the General
- Boris Smorchkov as the General
- Gennadi Matveyev as the General
- Pyotr Merkuryev as the guest at the wedding
- Aleksei Buldakov as the An-124 crew commander
- Yevgeni Gerchakov as the Symphony Orchestra Conductor
- Yuriy Kuzmenkov as the man with a goat
- Marina Golub as the manager of the philharmonic hall
- Klavdia Kozlyonkova as passenger at the plane (uncredited)
