= The Christmas Miracle =

- Directed by: Yury Feting; Andrei Kravchuk
- Written by: Yury Feting; Andrei Kravchuk
- Produced by: Viktor Sergeev
- Cinematography: Andrei Zhegalov
- Music by: Daler Nazarov
- Release date: 21 December 2000
- Running time: 93 minutes
- Country: Russia
- Language: Russian

The Christmas Miracle (Russian: Рождественская мистерия, romanized: Rozhdestvenskaya misteriya, lit. 'Christmas mystery') is a 2000 Russian romantic drama film directed by Yury Feting and Andrei Kravchuk, starring Aleksei Kravchenko and Chulpan Khamatova. It has a fairy-tale narrative about a couple who reunite at Christmas after many years apart. It was Kravchuk's debut film as director. The film was released in Russian cinemas on 21 December 2000.

== Cast ==
- Aleksei Kravchenko as Maksim
- Chulpan Khamatova as Masha
- Aleksandr Abdulov as puppeteer
- Sergey Shakurov as cosmonaut
- Yury Kuznetsov as Barankulov
- Svetlana Gaytan as teacher
- Alyona Khmelnitskaya as Anna
