= 12 (2007 film) =

- Theatrical release poster
- Directed by: Nikita Mikhalkov
- Screenplay by: Nikita Mikhalkov; Alexander Novototsky-Vlasov; Vladimir Moiseenko
- Based on: 12 Angry Men by Sidney Lumet; Twelve Angry Men by Reginald Rose
- Produced by: Nikita Mikhalkov; Leonid Vereschtchaguine
- Starring: Sergei Makovetsky; Nikita Mikhalkov; Sergei Garmash; Valentin Gaft; Alexei Petrenko; Yuri Stoyanov
- Cinematography: Vladislav Opelyants
- Edited by: Enzo Meniconi; Andrei Zaytsev
- Music by: Eduard Artemyev
- Distributed by: TriTe
- Release dates: 7 September 2007 (Venice); 20 September 2007
- Running time: 159 minutes
- Country: Russia
- Languages: Russian, Chechen
- Budget: $2.5 million
- Box office: $7.5 million

12 is a 2007 Russian legal drama film by director, screenwriter, producer and actor Nikita Mikhalkov. The film is a Russian-language remake of Sidney Lumet's 1957 film 12 Angry Men, which in turn was based on Reginald Rose's 1954 teleplay of the same name.

Mikhalkov was awarded the Special Lion at the 64th Venice International Film Festival for his work on the film, which also received an Academy Award nomination for Best Foreign Language Film. It received generally positive reviews from critics.

== Plot ==
A 12-man jury decides whether a young Chechen boy is guilty of murdering his stepfather, a Russian military officer. Initially, it seems that the boy was the murderer. However, one of the jurors votes in favour of acquittal. Since the verdict must be rendered unanimously, the jurors review the case, and one by one come to the conclusion that the boy was framed. The murder was performed by criminals involved in the construction business. The discussion is repeatedly interrupted by flashbacks from the boy's wartime childhood.

In the end, the foreman states that he was sure the boy did not commit the crime, but he will not vote in favour of acquittal, since the acquitted boy will be subsequently killed by the same criminals. Additionally, the foreman reveals that he is a former intelligence officer. After a brief argument, the foreman agrees to join the majority. Later, the foreman tells the boy that he will find the real murderers.

== Cast ==
- Sergei Makovetsky as the 1st Juror, a physicist
- Nikita Mikhalkov as the 2nd Juror, the foreman of the jury, a dilettante artist who turns out to be a Chechen War veteran
- Sergei Garmash as the 3rd Juror, a nationalist taxi driver
- Valentin Gaft as the 4th Juror, an elderly Jew
- Alexei Petrenko as the 5th Juror, a retired subway tunneler
- Yuri Stoyanov as the 6th Juror, a CEO of a TV channel and Harvard University alumnus
- Sergey Gazarov as the 7th Juror, a Georgian Armenian surgeon
- Mikhail Yefremov as the 8th Juror, a comedian
- Alexey Gorbunov as the 9th Juror, a cemetery manager
- Sergei Artsibashev as the 10th Juror, a democratic human rights activist
- Viktor Verzhbitsky as 11th Juror, an engineer
- Roman Madyanov as the 12th Juror, a dean
- Alexander Adabashyan as the Bailiff
- Natalya Surkova as the Judge
- Abdi Magamayev as the Defendant
- Apti Magamayev as the Chechen boy
- Ferit Myazitov as Mikhail Gorbachev
- Vladimir Komarov as the boy's stepfather
- Mikael Bazorkin as the boy's father
- Mesedo Salimova as the boy's mother
- Igor Vernik as the witness in golden glasses

== Reception ==
=== Critical response ===
The movie received generally positive critical opinion in Russia and abroad. 12 has an approval rating of 76% on review aggregator website Rotten Tomatoes, based on 59 reviews, and an average rating of 6.70/10. The website's critical consensus states, "Loosely based on 1957's 12 Angry Men, Nikita Mikhalkov's superbly acted 12 is clever and gripping like its predecessor, but with a distinctly Russian feel". It also has a score of 72 out of 100 on Metacritic, based on 17 critics, indicating "generally favorable reviews".

Russian president Vladimir Putin together with the film crew, Chechnya's president Ramzan Kadyrov and Ingushetia's president Murat Zyazikov watched the film in Putin's residence in Novo-Ogarevo; after the screening Putin remarked that the film "brought a tear to the eye". Opposition journalist Zoya Svetova labeled the film as pro-Putin, arguing that some of the characters are caricatures of Russian opposition politician Valeriya Novodvorskaya as well as producer Dmitry Lesnevsky.

=== Awards and nominations ===
12 received a special Golden Lion for the "consistent brilliance" of its work and was praised by many critics at the 64th Venice International Film Festival. The Venice jury defined the movie as "confirmation of his [Mikhalkov's] mastery in exploring and revealing to us, with great humanity and emotion, the complexity of existence". It was nominated for an Academy Award for Best Foreign Language Film.
