= Katala =

- Directed by: Sergei Bodrov; Alexander Buravsky
- Written by: Sergei Bodrov; Valery Barakin
- Produced by: Alexander Mikhailov
- Starring: Valery Garkalin; Yelena Safonova
- Cinematography: Sergei Taraskin
- Music by: Vladimir Dashkevich
- Production company: Mosfilm
- Release date: 1989
- Running time: 80 min.
- Country: USSR
- Language: Russian

Katala (Russian: Катала, romanized: Katala, also known as The Gambler) is a 1989 Soviet crime film directed by Sergei Bodrov and Alexander Buravsky.

== Plot ==
In a small seaside town lives Aleksei 'The Greek' Grekov, a former katala, a slang term in the criminal circles meaning professional gambler. He is retired and now serves as a sailor on a pleasure boat of the semi-criminal businessman named Shota. Life goes on smoothly, but suddenly a terrible event occurs. Shota, having lost a lot of money to the criminal boss named "Director", tries to hide, the boat is burned right in the port, and Anna, Shota's girlfriend, is taken hostage by the bandits. Despite various efforts Shota falls into the hands of the criminals and they brutally kill him, but The Greek helps Anna and her young daughter escape to Moscow. Aleksei understands that while the Director does not receive all the debts of late Shota, he will go after Anna. And so The Greek who is in love with Anna decides to return to his former "craft" in order to "earn" money with a card game in order to save Anna.

In Moscow, The Greek meets his longtime acquaintance, a criminal named Crucian, and soon they begin to win money playing cards against underground businessmen, bandits and simply gullible citizens. The amount of money accumulated by Aleksei is growing, but The Greek clearly understands that only by obtaining a huge jackpot can he finish once and for all this sordid matter. Aleksei undertakes a suicidal risk. He secretly buys special lenses that allow him to see what cards others have and challenges the Director himself to a one-on-one match. The big game begins and the Director loses large sums to The Greek. Lola, the criminal boss's assistant, draws attention to a certain oddity: during the game Aleksei goes to the toilet every two hours allegedly to freshen up. In reality he occasionally has to remove his miracle-lenses because they place a terrible strain on the eyes and can lead to loss of vision. The bandits uncover the Greek's ploy and beat Aleksei into a mutilated half-blind invalid.

Returning to his hometown, The Greek begins to work again in the port. After meeting with Anna, he receives terrible news. It turns out that after the death of Shota, Anna hid all his money, deceiving both the bandits and Aleksei. Shaken by Anna's treachery, The Greek bids farewell to her forever. Soon Aleksei is summoned to the police, he gives evidence against the Director, and the bloody revenge of the bandits does not delay itself.

== Cast ==
- Valery Garkalin as Aleksei Grekov (voice by Aleksei Zharkov)
- Sergey Gazarov as Shota, businessman
- Yelena Safonova as Anna, Shota's girlfriend
- Viktor Pavlov as Crucian
- Lyudmila Gavrilova as Crucian's concubine
- Nodar Mgaloblishvili as Director, mafia boss (voice by Vladimir Soshalsky)
- Luiza Mosendz as Lola, Director's helper
- Igor Fokin as Phoma, Director's helper
- Renat Davletyarov as criminal
- Yuri Slobodenyuk as criminal
- Sergey Stepanchenko as Lola's lover, police officer
- Vitaly Leonov as Anna's father
- Kristina Shcherbakova as Lisa, Anna's daughter
- Larisa Kuznetsova as prostitute in the port
- Alexander Barinov as young gambler
- Vadim Aleksandrov as lost man
- Alex Papacristu as uncle Christos

== Production ==
The filming took place in Moscow, as well as in the Adjarian Autonomous Soviet Socialist Republic: in Batumi, Chakvi and Kobuleti.
