= Silver Lily of the Valley =

- Russian: Ландыш серебристый
- Directed by: Tigran Keosayan
- Written by: Tigran Keosayan; Ganna Oganisyan-Slutski
- Produced by: Valeri Belotserkovsky; Felix Kleiman
- Starring: Olesya Zheleznyak; Yuri Stoyanov; Aleksandr Tsekalo; Elena Khmelnitskaya; Vladimir Ilyin
- Cinematography: Ilya Dyomin
- Edited by: Lidiya Volokhova
- Music by: Sergey Terekhov
- Production company: Capricorn Studio
- Release date: 2000
- Running time: 88 min.
- Country: Russia
- Language: Russian

Silver Lily of the Valley (Russian: Ландыш серебристый, romanized: Landysh serebristyy) is a 2000 Russian tragicomedy film directed by Tigran Keosayan. The film tells about a young girl, Zoya Misochkina, who meets two producers which radically changed her life, and she embarked on the path of a new pop star.

== Plot ==
Zoya Misochkina, the daughter of a small-town police sergeant, dreams of becoming a singer. She longs to go to Moscow to take singing lessons and hopes to perform at a local train station restaurant. However, her father continually stops her by pulling her off the train and bringing her back to her hometown of Lokotki. After yet another failed attempt, Zoya finds herself in the local detention center, where she meets two Moscow producers, Lyova Bolotov and Stas Pridorozhny, who have just had a fallout with their star client, Irma. Following a drunken episode, the producers were arrested for disorderly conduct, and Zoya helps them get released, seizing the opportunity to follow them to Moscow.

Once in Moscow, Zoya’s enthusiasm initially irritates Lyova, especially her strong perfume, "Lily of the Valley". Despite their frustrations, Lyova and Stas recognize her singing talent and decide to promote her career. During this time, Zoya falls for Lyova, but he is more interested in fleeting romances after his marriage with Irma ended when she left him for Stas. Meanwhile, Irma and Stas’ son Ludwig returns from England and proposes to Zoya, but she dismisses his advances. When Zoya sees Lyova with a younger woman, she, heartbroken, decides to return to Lokotki, taking Ludwig with her. Each character finds themselves in emotional turmoil—Zoya mourns her unrequited love, Irma weeps in her luxury car feeling unloved, Lyova smokes in frustration, and Stas feels guilt over the strained relationships. The film concludes with Zoya singing at the Lokotki station restaurant, fulfilling her original dream. During one performance, she notices a weary Stas watching from a table and Lyova smiling at the edge of the stage. She rejoins the two men but, two years later, ultimately leaves them for other producers.

== Cast ==
- Olesya Zheleznyak as Zoya Misochkina
- Yuri Stoyanov as Stas Pridorozhny
- Aleksandr Tsekalo as Lev Bolotov
- Alyona Khmelnitskaya as Irma
- Vladimir Ilyin as Misochkin
- Valery Garkalin as Kromin
- Daniil Belykh as Lyudvig
- Olesya Sudzilovskaya as blonde
- Viktoriya Tolstoganova as girl
- Georgy Martirosyan as pilot
- Avangard Leontiev as episode
- Tigran Keosayan as a visitor in the club
- Sergey Amoralov as cameo
