= Roman Madyanov =

Soviet and Russian actor (1962–2024)

- Роман Мадянов
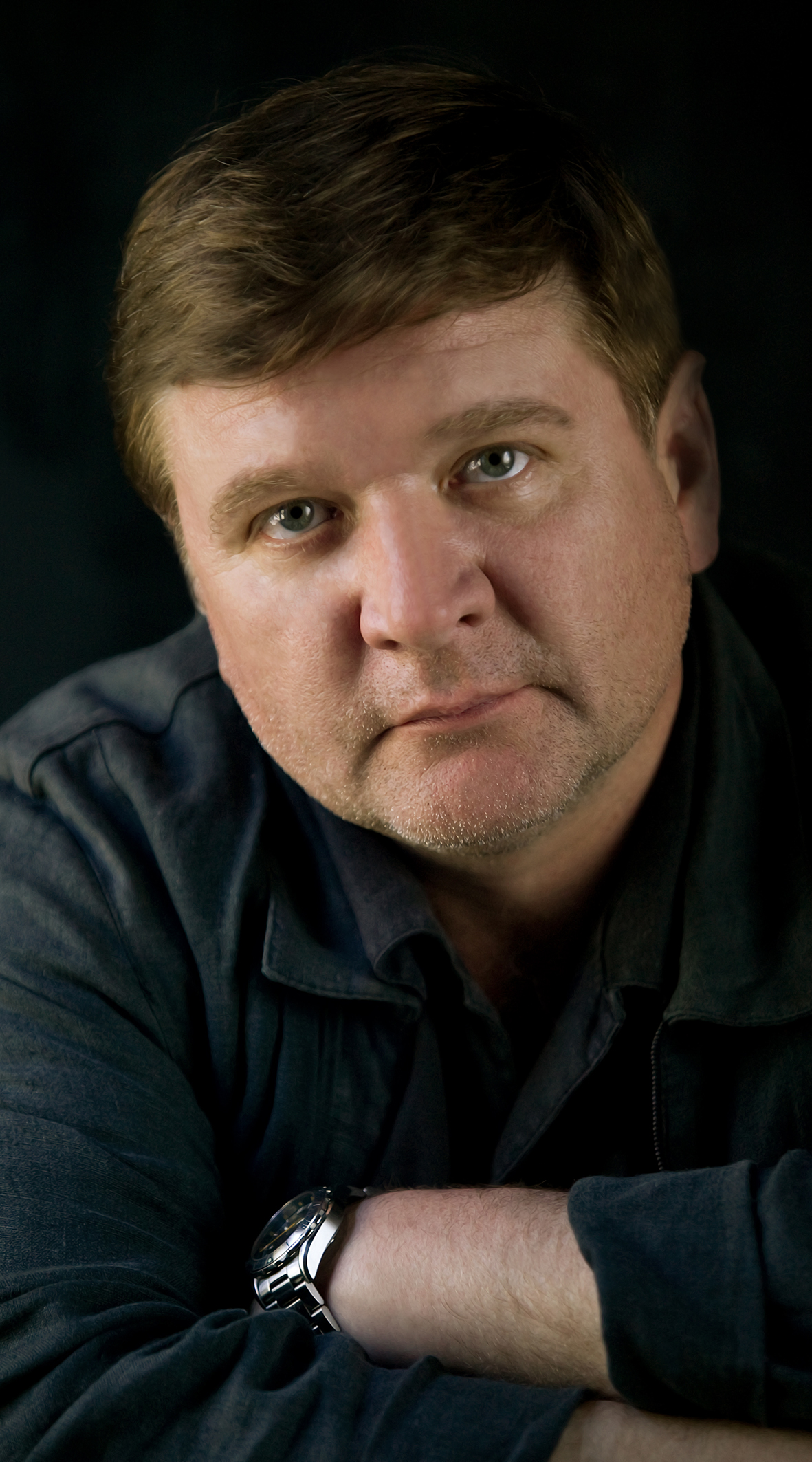
- Madyanov in 2007
- Born: 22 July 1962; Dedovsk, Istrinsky District, Moscow Oblast, Russian SFSR, Soviet Union
- Died: 25 September 2024 (aged 62); Novogireyevo, Moscow, Russia
- Citizenship: Soviet Union; Russia
- Occupation: Actor
- Years active: 1972–2024
- Awards: Honored Artist of the Russian Federation

Roman Sergeevich Madyanov (Russian: Роман Сергеевич Мадянов; 22 July 1962 – 25 September 2024) was a Soviet and Russian actor. Madyanov's career in cinema began as a child actor when he starred as Huckleberry Finn in Hopelessly Lost (1973). He was best known in the West for portraying the corrupt mayor Vadim in the 2014 film Leviathan.

== Biography ==
Madyanov was born in the city of Dedovsk, Istrinsky District, Moscow Oblast on 22 July 1962. His father, Sergei Veniaminovich Madyanov, worked as a television editor, and his mother Antonina Mikhailovna as a librarian.

Roman Madyanov's father worked as a director on television and often took Roman and his elder brother Vadim to work. There he was noticed by assistants of directors, which led him to have his cinematic debut in 1971 in an episodic role in the film "Translation from English".

In 1973, he starred in the leading role of Huckleberry Finn in the picture by Georgiy Daneliya Hopelessly Lost. In his school years, Madyanov also starred in the films "Aniskin and Fantomas", "Spring Turners" and "Everything is Brother's Fault".

Madyanov graduated from the Russian Academy of Theatre Arts (course of O. Remez), playing in the theatrical performance of director Kama Ginkas. As a student, he began to play at the Moscow Mayakovsky Theater. He was drafted in the army and served in the forces of rocket and space defense. After serving in the army in 1987, he returned to the theater. In the state of the theater, Madyanov was about twenty years old, having played about thirty roles.

In 1989, Madyanov appeared in the Leonid Gaidai film Private Detective, or Operation Cooperation.

He also took part in the filming of the Yeralash magazine and in a number of commercials.

In 1995, Madyanov was awarded the title of "Honored Artist of the Russian Federation".

Madyanov died from lung cancer on 25 September 2024, at the age of 62.

== Selected filmography ==
Roman Madyanov starred in over 145 films.

- 1973 – Hopelessly Lost (Russian: Совсем пропащий) as Huckleberry Finn
- 1989 – Private Detective, or Operation Cooperation (Частный детектив или операция "Кооперация") as Victor
- 1990 – Passport (Паспорт) as the man in the airport
- 1993 – Nastya (Настя) as Morgunin
- 1995 – Small Demon (Мелкий бес) as Tcherepnin
- 1995 – Heads and Tails as Klimova's husband
- 1997 – Poor Sasha (Бедная Саша) as the prison guard
- 1998 – Composition for Victory Day (Сочинение ко Дню Победы) as Chubais
- 1999 – Mother (Мама) as the sergeant
- 2001 – Life Is Full of Fun (Жизнь забавами полна) as Edik
- 2002 – The Kopeck (Копейка) as the former KGB officer / Militiaman / Visa and Registration for Foreigners Office employee
- 2005 – The Case of Dead Souls (Дело о Мёртвых душах) as Ivan Shpekin
- 2005 – Yesenin (Есенин) as Sergey Kirov
- 2006 – The First Circle (В круге первом) as Viktor Abakumov
- 2007 – 12 (Двенадцать) as the 12th Juror
- 2007 – Father (Отец) as Khariton
- 2007 – The Irony of Fate 2 (Ирония Судьбы. Продолжение) as the police officer
- 2009 – Wild Field (Дикое поле) as Ryabov
- 2009 – Pete on the Way to Heaven (Петя по дороге в Царствие Небесное) as Colonel Boguslavsky
- 2009 – High Security Vacation (Каникулы строгого режима) as Fang
- 2010 – Our Russia. The Balls of Fate (Наша Russia. Яйца судьбы) as Oleg Robertovich
- 2011 – Lucky Trouble (Выкрутасы) as the Road Patrol Service Inspector
- 2011 – Yolki 2 (Ёлки 2) as the officer of the State Traffic Safety Inspectorate
- 2011 – All Inclusive (All inclusive, или Всё включено!) as Eduard Budko
- 2011 – Burnt by the Sun 3: The Citadel as Major general Melezhko
- 2012 – Once Upon a Time There Lived a Simple Woman (Жила-была одна баба) as Baranchik
- 2013 – Legend № 17 (Легенда №17) as Vladimir Alfer
- 2013 – One Particular Pioneer (Честное пионерское) as the keeper
- 2014 – Leviathan (Левиафан) as Mayor Vadim Shelevyat
- 2015 – Iron Ivan (Поддубный) as Tverdokhlebov
- 2015 – Catherine the Great (Великая) as Count Alexander Shuvalov
- 2015 – Orlova and Alexandrov (Орлова и Александров) as Igor Ilyinsky
- 2016 – The Monk and the Demon (Монах и бес) as the bishop
- 2016 – The Groom (Жених) as the general
- 2017 – Once Upon a Time (Жили-были) as Lyokha
- 2017 – The Road to Calvary (Хождение по мукам) as Olovyannikov
- 2018 – House Arrest (Домашний арест) as the governor
- 2018 – Doctor Richter (Доктор Рихтер) as Tyoma's father
- 2019 – A Frenchman (Француз) as Nikolay Chukhnovsky
- 2020 – Zuleikha Opens Her Eyes (Зулейха открывает глаза) as Zinovy Kuznets
- 2020 – The Last Frontier (Подольские курсанты) as General Vasily Smirnov
- 2021 – BOOMERang (БУМЕРанг) as the pastor
- 2021 – Russian South (Рашн Юг) as Pyotr Ivanovich
- 2021 – Girls Got Game (Нефутбол) as Palych
- 2023 – Wish of the Fairy Fish (По щучьему велению) as King Theophan
- 2024 – Sklifosovsky (Склифосовский) as the chief physician

== Awards and nominations ==
Year	Award	Work	Category	Result
1995	State Prize of the Russian Federation	Lifetime Achievement	Honored Artist of the Russian Federation	Won
2008	Golden Eagle Award	12	Best Leading Actor	Won
2009	Nika Award	Wild Field	Best Supporting Actor	Won
2010	Nika Award	Pete on the Way to Heaven	Best Supporting Actor	Won
2012	Nika Award	Once Upon a Time There Lived a Simple Woman	Best Supporting Actor	Won
2015	Golden Eagle Award	Leviathan	Best Supporting Actor	Won
