= Yaytso Faberzhe =

The Faberge Egg
- Directed by: Ilya Farfel
- Written by: Andrey Nikiforov; Sergey Panasenkov; Maksim Parshin; Stanislav Tlyashev
- Produced by: Anton Shchukin; Anton Zaytsev; Artyom Loginov
- Starring: Nikolay Naumov; Maksim Lagashkin; Yuri Stoyanov; Olga Vinichenko; Ilya Borisov; Aleksandr Mekhryakov; Polina Shustareva
- Cinematography: Janis Andrejevs
- Edited by: Dmitrii Smorchkov
- Music by: Aleksandr Vartanov
- Production companies: Good Story Media; TNT
- Release date: February 10, 2022
- Country: Russia
- Language: Russian

The Faberge Egg (Russian: Яйцо Фаберже, romanized: Yaytso Faberzhe) is a 2022 Russian black comedy film directed by Ilya Farfel. It was theatrically released on February 10, 2022.

== Plot ==
The film follows two old friends from a provincial town who find themselves at rock bottom and decide to pursue their dreams by stealing a Fabergé egg from a museum. Alexander, who sells frying pans door-to-door, and his friend Nikita team up with a stranger named "Fabergé", who proposes the heist for a lucrative payday. They assemble a gang of four, all struggling financially, to carry out the theft. However, complications arise as tensions grow between Alexander and Nikita over Nikita's wife, Lyuba, who ultimately leaves Nikita for Alexander. Although they successfully steal the egg, Nikita is arrested and jailed, becoming the only one who knows its hidden location. To extract Nikita from prison and recover the egg, Alexander enlists the help of an excavator hired with Fabergé's money. The situation further deteriorates when they discover that another member has re-hidden the egg in a bank vault, forcing them to devise a new plan for retrieval, all while realizing that Fabergé never intended to pay them for their efforts.

== Cast ==
- Nikolay Naumov
- Maksim Lagashkin
- Yuri Stoyanov
- Olga Vinichenko
- Ilya Borisov
- Aleksandr Mekhryakov
- Polina Shustareva
