= Valery Garkalin =

Russian actor (1954–2021)

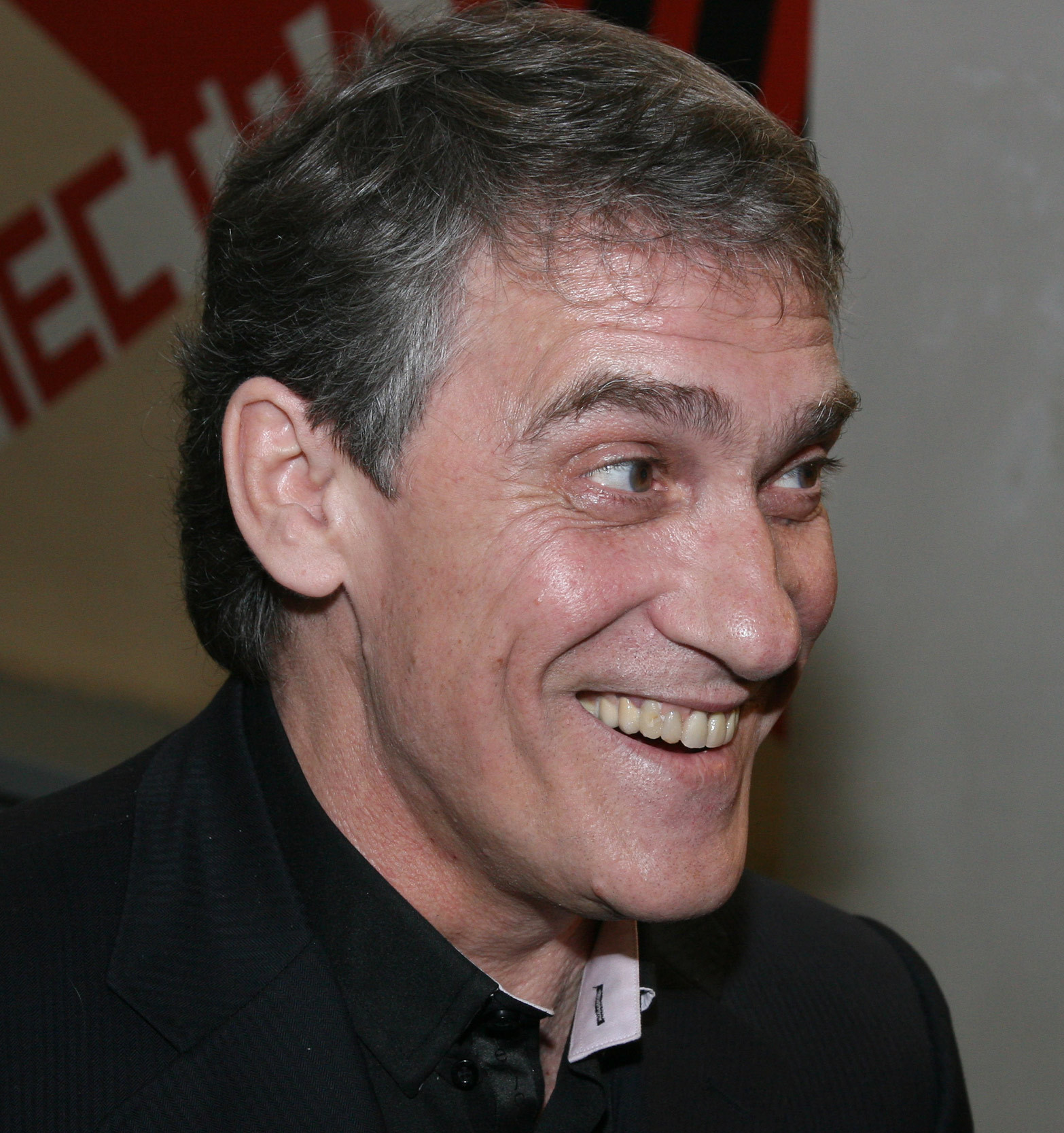
- Born: 11 April 1954; Moscow, Russian SFSR, Soviet Union
- Died: 20 November 2021 (aged 67); Moscow, Russia
- Occupation: Actor
- Years active: 1978–2021

Valery Borisovich Garkalin (Russian: Вале́рий Бори́сович Гарка́лин; 11 April 1954 – 20 November 2021) was a Soviet and Russian theater and film actor. He was awarded the People's Artist of the Russian Federation in 2008. Garkalin was also a professor of GITIS.]

== Personal life ==
He was married to Yekaterina from 1978 until her death in 2009. His daughter Nika is active in theatrical production. His son-in-law is an actor of the Theatre of Nations Pavel Akimkin. Garkalin became a grandfather in 2012 when his daughter gave birth to a son named Timofey.

Garkalin was hospitalized with COVID-19 in Kommunarka on 2 October 2021, during the COVID-19 pandemic in Russia. He died from complications from his comorbidities on 20 November 2021.

== Selected filmography ==
- The Scarlet Flower (1977) as man in the village
- Katala (1989) as Aleksei Grekov
- Tsar Ivan the Terrible (1991) as Vaska Gryaznoy
- Zone of Lyube (1994) as Silnyy
- Russian Symphony (1994) as Borisych
- What a Mess! (1995) as Vasily Krolikov, Innokentiy Shniperson, Roman Almazov and Patrick Crolikow
- Poor Sasha (1997) as Nikolay Kryshkin
- House for the Rich (2000) as captain Skorokhodov
- Silver Lily of the Valley (2000) as Roman Kromin
- Yeralash (2004—2006) as cameo
- Fitil (2004—2006) as cameo
- My Fair Nanny (2004) as writer Francois Lyapen
- Popsa (2005) as Lev Malinovsky
- One Night of Love (2008) as Monsieur Charles, Fencing Teacher

== Awards ==
- Kinoshock (1995) — Award for Best Actor
- Honored Artist of the Russian Federation (2000) for merits in the field of art
- People's Artist of Russia (2008)
