= Olesya Zheleznyak =

Russian actress

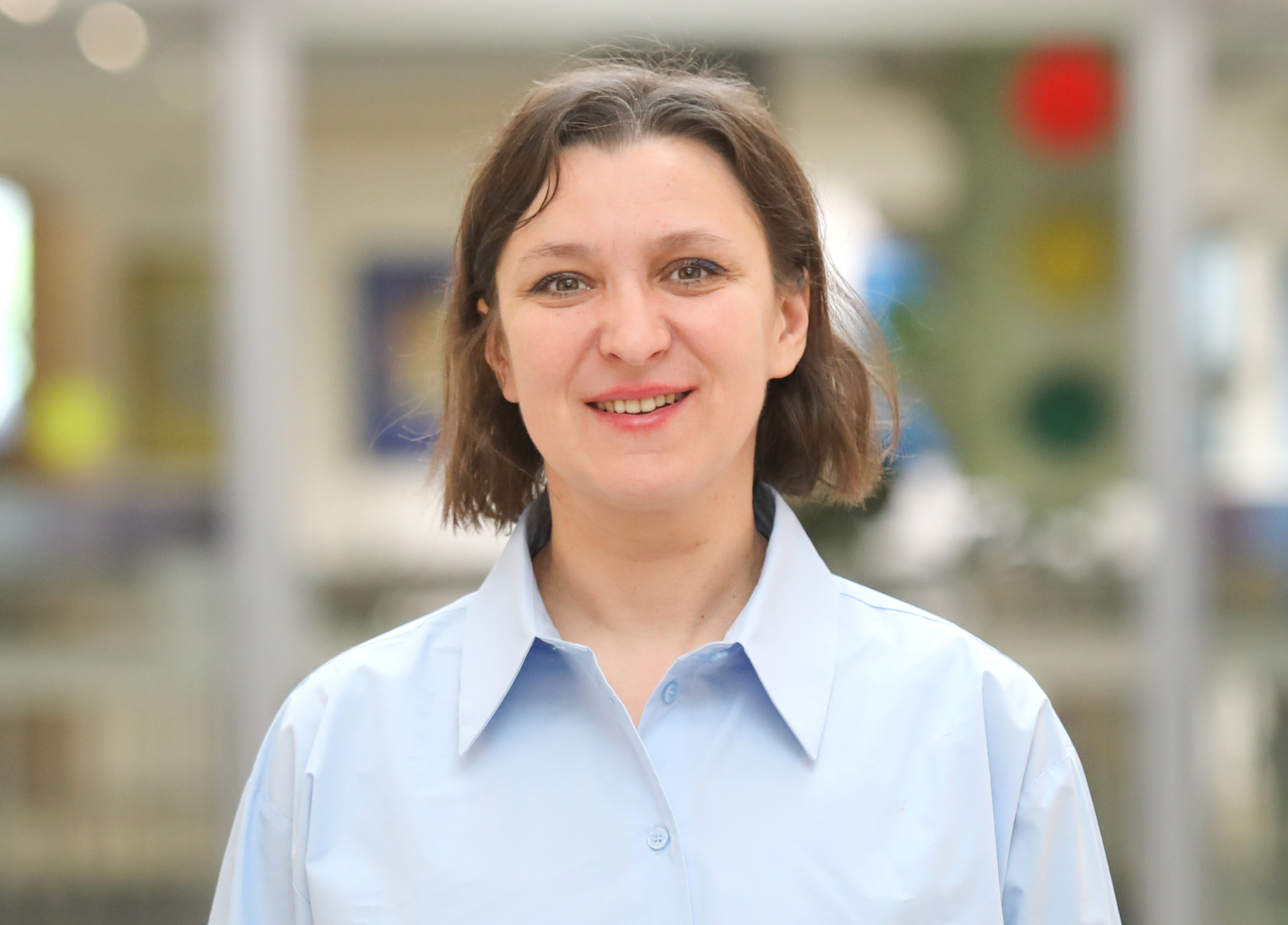
- Zheleznyak in 2023
- Born: Olesya Vladimirovna Zheleznyak; 11 November 1974 (age 51); Moscow
- Occupation: actress
- Years active: 2000–present

Olesya Vladimirovna Zheleznyak (Russian: Оле́ся Влади́мировна Железня́к; born November 11, 1974) is a Russian theater and film actress, TV presenter. Winner of the All-Russian Theater Prize Seagull Award in 2002.

== Biography ==
Olesya Zheleznyak was born on November 11, 1974, in Moscow. Her mother worked as a seamstress, and her father a loader. She has an older sister Lyudmila. The family has Ukrainian ancestry, and in a 2023 interview she claimed she was Ukrainian.

In childhood, she studied at a choreographic studio. In 1999 she graduated from the Russian Academy of Theatre Arts (Mark Zakharov's course) and was accepted into the troupe of the Lenkom Theatre. Her first performance was The Barbarian and the Heretic.

Zheleznyak became popular after a successful film debut in the film Silver Lily of the Valley by Tigran Keosayan. In 2015, she dubbed Sadness in the animated film Inside Out in Russian. She appeared in the second season of ice show contest Ice Age.

=== Political views ===
Zheleznyak is an avid supporter of the presidency of Vladimir Putin. She has repeatedly visited Russian-occupied Crimea and has publicly supported the Russian invasion of Ukraine, claiming in 2023 that Volodymyr Zelenskyy (a former producer for the comedy series Svaty in which she starred) "brings evil" and wants to "kill my children".

== Selected filmography ==
- Silver Lily of the Valley (2000) as Zoya Misochkina
- Balakirev the Buffoon (2002) as Dunya Burykina
- My Fair Nanny (2004—2008) as Galya Kopylova
- Love in the Big City (2009) as Pelageya
- Svaty (2010—2017) as Larisa
- 8 First Dates (2012) as Zinaida Ivanovna
- And Here's What's Happening to Me (2012) as Nastya
- Milk (2021) as woman in the park
- Papy (2022) as Elena Mishina
- Poyekhavshaya (2023) as Katerina

== Personal life ==
Olesya is married to actor Spartak Sumchenko (born 1973). They have four children.
