= Poor Sasha =

- Directed by: Tigran Keosayan
- Written by: Sergey Beloshnikov; Vladimir Bragin
- Produced by: Ivan Demidov; David Keosayan; Tatiana Voronovich
- Starring: Aleksandr Zbruyev; Vera Glagoleva
- Cinematography: Yuri Lyubshin
- Music by: Artemy Artemyev
- Release date: 26 December 1997
- Running time: 95 min
- Country: Russia
- Language: Russian

Poor Sasha (Russian: Бедная Саша, romanized: Bednaya Sasha) is a 1997 Russian adventure comedy film directed by Tigran Keosayan.

== Plot ==
A touching New Year's fairy tale about those who, despite money and status, lack love and warmth.

Moscow, late 1990s. Beryozkin, an honest, but unlucky bank robber is granted temporarily leave from prison after rescuing a general who's locked himself in a vault. He is given money by the prison warden and one of the mob bosses for gifts, but the money gets stolen by a pickpocket, and Beryozkin realizes that his best option is to commit suicide in order to avoid an otherwise gruesome death. He is saved by a tramp named Aristarchus, who offers him a solution: to rob the home of a banker.

Little do they know that the banker's home is booby-trapped by her twelve-year-old daughter Sasha. The unfortunate Beryozkin gets captured. However, instead of calling the police, Sasha blackmails Beryozkin into helping her rob her own mother, because she wants her mother "to stop being a businesswoman and to become a mother again".

Things go as planned except that the banker's security are actually criminals, and plan to rob the banker themselves.

== Cast ==
- Aleksandr Zbruyev as Beryozkin, the unfortunate bank-robber
- Vera Glagoleva as Sasha's Mother, the banker
- Yulia Chernova as Sasha
- Boris Sichkin as Aristarkh Rostopchin, the tramp that helps Beryozkin
- Olga Volkova as Amalia Arkadyevna, Sasha's nanny
- Valery Garkalin as Kryshkin, one of the bank security/ robbers
- Spartak Mishulin as the mob boss that gives Beryozkin money
- Nina Ruslanova as Beryozkin's ex-wife
- Armen Dzhigarkhanyan as the prison warden
- Roman Madyanov as a prison guard
- Georgy Martirosyan as another prison guard

== Awards ==
- Kinotavr: Best Actor — Aleksandr Zbruyev
- TEFI: Best Feature Film
- IFF children's films Artek: Best actress-girl — Yulia Chernova
