= Central Russia's Vampires =

- Genre: fantasy detective mystery comedy
- Written by: Aleksey Akimov; Olga Simonova; Roman Borodavkin; Konstantin Garbuzov; Dmitriy Shepelevich
- Directed by: Anton Maslov; Dmitry Gribanov
- Composers: Ivan Kanaev; Denis Vorontsov
- Country of origin: Russia
- Original language: Russian
- No. of seasons: 3
- No. of episodes: 26 + 1 special episode

Production
- Producers: Eduard Iloyan; Vitaliy Shlyappo; Denis Zhalinskiy; Aleksey Trotsyuk
- Running time: 50-73 minutes

Original release
- Network: Start; TNT channel
- Release: 18 March 2021 – 27 March 2026

Central Russia's Vampires (Note: Central Russia is an informal region of Russia, vaguely between Southern and Northern Russia) (Russian: Вампиры средней полосы, romanized: Vampiry srednej polosy) is a Russian TV series produced since 2021. Made by "Start Studio" film companies. The premiere was held on the Start video service. The television premiere took place on the TNT channel.

== Plot ==
=== 1st Season ===
A family of vampires lives peacefully in Smolensk. They don't touch people. But the Guardians keep an eye on the vampires. One day, in a birch grove near Smolensk, the police find the completely drained corpses of two guys with bite marks. The vampires headed by Svyatoslav Vernidubovich are tasked with finding the killers.

== Cast and characters ==
- Yuri Stoyanov as Svyatoslav Vernidubovich Krivich (head of the vampire family)
- Ekaterina Kuznetsova (season 1) / Anastasiya Stezhko (season 2) as Anna (vampire, policeman)
- Gleb Kalyuzhny as Evgeniy (vampire, blogger)
- Artyom Tkachenko as Jean Ivanovich (vampire, doctor)
- Olga Medynich as countess Olga Vorontsova (vampire, theater teacher)
- Mikhail Gavrilov as Ivan Zhalinskiy (policeman)
- Tatyana Dogileva as Irina Vitalyevna Bredikhina (head of the Guardians)
- Dmitry Lysenkov as Konstantin Bredikhin (Irina Vitalievna's son, later – the new head of the Guardians)
- Andrey Sokolov as Andrey Usachev (policeman) — season 2
- Eva Smirnova as Mila (vampire, child) — season 2
- Egor Druzhinin as Boris Feliksovich (enemy of vampires) — season 2

== Seasons ==
- The first season was shown from March 18, 2021, to May 6, 2021.
- A special New Year's episode was released on December 29, 2021.
- The second season was shown from December 13, 2022, to January 31, 2023.

=== Season 1 (2021) ===
No. overall	No. in season	Title	Directed by	Written by	Original release date
1	1	"Episode 1"	Anton Maslov	Aleksey Akimov	March 18, 2021
Near Smolensk, the police find bloodless bodies. A Moscow investigator is engaged in a high-profile case, not suspecting that it is worth looking for answers from an ordinary student.
2	2	"Episode 2"	Anton Maslov	Aleksey Akimov	March 18, 2021
The third victim is a real lead for the investigation and a big problem for the vampires. And Slava's grandfather already has a suspect.
3	3	"Episode 3"	Anton Maslov	Aleksey Akimov	March 25, 2021
The fugitive's testimony raises even more questions. After narrowly escaping death, he clearly went mad and started talking about vampires. This has happened here before. This story may shed light on the mysterious murders.
4	4	"Episode 4"	Anton Maslov	Aleksey Akimov	April 1, 2021
Vampires keep secrets not only from the investigator, but also from each other. What did Jean and grandfather Slava think? And do they have a choice?
5	5	"Episode 5"	Anton Maslov	Aleksey Akimov	April 8, 2021
From relatives, Annushka barely keeps the shoulder straps on her shoulders. Grandpa Slava and Jean were detained, and Zhenek was in the wrong place at the wrong time. Monsters live in all of us, and sometimes they come out.
6	6	"Episode 6"	Anton Maslov	Aleksey Akimov	April 15, 2021
A secret in the wrong hands is a ticking time bomb. The killer is apprehended, and Ivan should leave the city. But he intends to interrogate the criminal. The Guardians should have apologized: the vampires weren't involved in the murders.
7	7	"Episode 7"	Anton Maslov	Aleksey Akimov	April 22, 2021
The third victim is a real lead for the investigation and a big problem for the vampires. And Slava's grandfather already has a suspect. Annushka is forced to work on two fronts. The investigation is closing in on her family.
8	8	"Episode 8"	Anton Maslov	Aleksey Akimov	May 6, 2021
Vampires are threatened with extermination, it is impossible to stay in Smolensk. Klim wants revenge and knows no mercy. Someone has to stop him.
9	9	"Novogodnyaya seriya"	Anton Maslov	Aleksey Akimov	December 29, 2021
A special episode set on New Year's Eve after Zhenya accidentally turns into a vampire.

=== Season 2 (2022–23) ===
No. overall	No. in season	Title	Directed by	Written by	Original release date
10	1	"Episode 1"	Dmitry Gribanov	Aleksey Akimov	December 13, 2022
Eternal life does not guarantee a peaceful life. A mysterious crime promises a family of vampires new problems. And an unexpected acquaintance.
11	2	"Episode 2"	Dmitry Gribanov	Aleksey Akimov	December 20, 2022
A new victim and a vampire on the run - everything is not going in favor of the bloodsuckers. Annushka's legend is under threat - the ghosts of the past demand an answer.
12	3	"Episode 3"	Dmitry Gribanov	Aleksey Akimov	December 27, 2022
The trouble is the size of a meter. Annushka is trying to track down the escaped vampire through police reports, and grandfather Slava knows exactly where to look for the fugitive.
13	4	"Episode 4"	Dmitry Gribanov	Aleksey Akimov	January 3, 2023
It's time to talk to Mila like an adult, and to Olga like a human being. The family needs to learn more about the outsiders who have already managed in Smolensk.
14	5	"Episode 5"	Dmitry Gribanov	Aleksey Akimov	January 10, 2023
Death circles around the vampire family. Is it connected with the arrival of Mila's relatives or the discord between the Keepers?
15	6	"Episode 6"	Dmitry Gribanov	Aleksey Akimov	January 17, 2023
Alien vampires are in the city and are looking for the defenders of the fugitive, who already have enough problems. Olga chose not the best time for drama.
16	7	"Episode 7"	Dmitry Gribanov	Aleksey Akimov	January 24, 2023
Lieutenant Colonel Usachev finds a daughter, and a friendly vampire family may lose their lives. If Grandfather Slava does not come up with a plan, there will be a disaster.
17	8	"Episode 8"	Dmitry Gribanov	Aleksey Akimov	January 31, 2023
Time to show your teeth. Human lives versus one vampire life. Someone will be resurrected, and clouds will gather over someone.

== Production ==
In 2018, the filming of the pilot series took place in Smolensk. Filming of the first season took place in Moscow, Smolensk and Serpukhov from January to December 2020. The second season was filmed in 2022. The role of Stanislav Vernidubovich was originally written for Yuri Stoyanov. On February 2, 2023, it was announced that the series had been renewed for a third season.

== Reception ==
The series received mostly positive reviews from critics. Kino-teatr.ru and Mir Fantastiki publications named "The Vampires of Midland" the best Russian TV series of 2021.

=== Awards ===
- In 2018, for his role in the series, Yuri Stoyanov received the award as the "Best Actor of a pilot of a television series" at the first Pilot Television Series festival in Ivanovo.
- In 2022, the series won the fourth National Award in the field of the web industry in the nomination "Best Internet series with a running time of more than 24 minutes". And Yuri Stoyanov won in the nomination "Best actor in an Internet series".
- In 2023, the series won the APKiT Award — in the nomination "Best Comedy Series".
