= Rabbit Over the Void =

- Russian: Заяц над бездной
- Directed by: Tigran Keosayan
- Written by: Dmitry Ivanov
- Produced by: Ruben Dishdishyan
- Starring: Bohdan Stupka; Vladimir Ilyin; Yuri Stoyanov; Yelena Safonova; Mikhail Yefremov
- Cinematography: Igor Klebanov
- Music by: Alexey Rybnikov
- Production company: 2V Media
- Distributed by: Central Partnership
- Release date: February 9, 2006
- Running time: 97 min.
- Country: Russia
- Language: Russian

Rabbit Over the Void (Russian: Заяц над бездной, romanized: Zayats nad bezdnoy) is a 2006 Russian comedy film directed by Tigran Keosayan.

== Plot ==
In 1971, in Chișinău, the capital of the Moldavian SSR, preparations are in full swing for a visit from the General Secretary of the Communist Party, Leonid Ilyich Brezhnev. Determined to impress their leader, party officials organize various events, even forcing local football players to learn hockey because of Brezhnev’s love for the sport. However, upon arrival, Brezhnev finds the events uninspiring and instead departs in a hot air balloon. While the police and army search for the missing Secretary, he lands near a remote village where a Roma baron lives.

The baron's daughter, Anna, is in love with Lautar, a local violinist of mixed Roma and Romanian heritage, but the baron refuses to marry her off to a poor musician, especially one half-Romanian. Despite Lautar’s attempts to impress him, even stealing Brezhnev’s limousine as a wedding gift, the baron insists that only another Roma baron can propose on Lautar's behalf—a high demand since there are only five in the USSR.

Brezhnev steps in to help Lautar, approaching the baron as his matchmaker and humorously threatening to officially classify the Roma as either Romanians or native Siberians if the wedding doesn’t proceed. After securing the marriage, the baron and his people decide to fulfill Brezhnev’s ultimate dream—an imagined meeting and wedding with Queen Elizabeth II of the United Kingdom.

== Cast ==
- Bohdan Stupka as Leonid Brezhnev
- Sergey Gazarov as the Gipsy baron
- Vladimir Ilyin as Ivan Smirnov
- Yuri Stoyanov as Semion Grossu
- Vartan Darakchyan as Lautar (voiced by Artur Smolyaninov)
- Valeriya Lanskaya as Baron's daughter
- Yelena Safonova as Elizabeth II
- Mikhail Yefremov as Colonel Blyndu
- Alyona Khmelnitskaya as Rada Volshaninova
- Igor Zolotovitsky as Malay
- Vsevolod Gavrilov as constructor
