= Hearts of Three =

Novel by Jack London

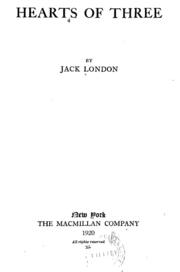
- Titlepage of first edition
- Author: Jack London
- Language: English
- Genre: Fiction
- Publisher: The Macmillan Company
- Publication date: 1920
- Publication place: United States
- Media type: Print (hardback & paperback)

Hearts of Three is an adventure novel by Jack London. The novel was finished right before the writer's death and released in 1919–1920 in the New York Journal. It is based on an idea by Charles Goddard.

== Plot ==
Young descendant of the pirate Henry Morgan, who left him a rich heritage, wants to find the treasure of his ancestor. On the way, he meets his distant cousin, also Henry Morgan. Together, they will find dangerous adventures, unknown lands, and love.

== Cinematization ==
In 1992, the novel was cinematized and released under the same title as a TV mini-series in Russia and Ukraine, by Oleksandr Dovzhenko Film Studio (Kyiv), with the participation of the Yalta Film Studio (Yalta, Crimea).
