= Dedovsk =

Town in Moscow Oblast, Russia

Dedovsk Дедовск
- Town
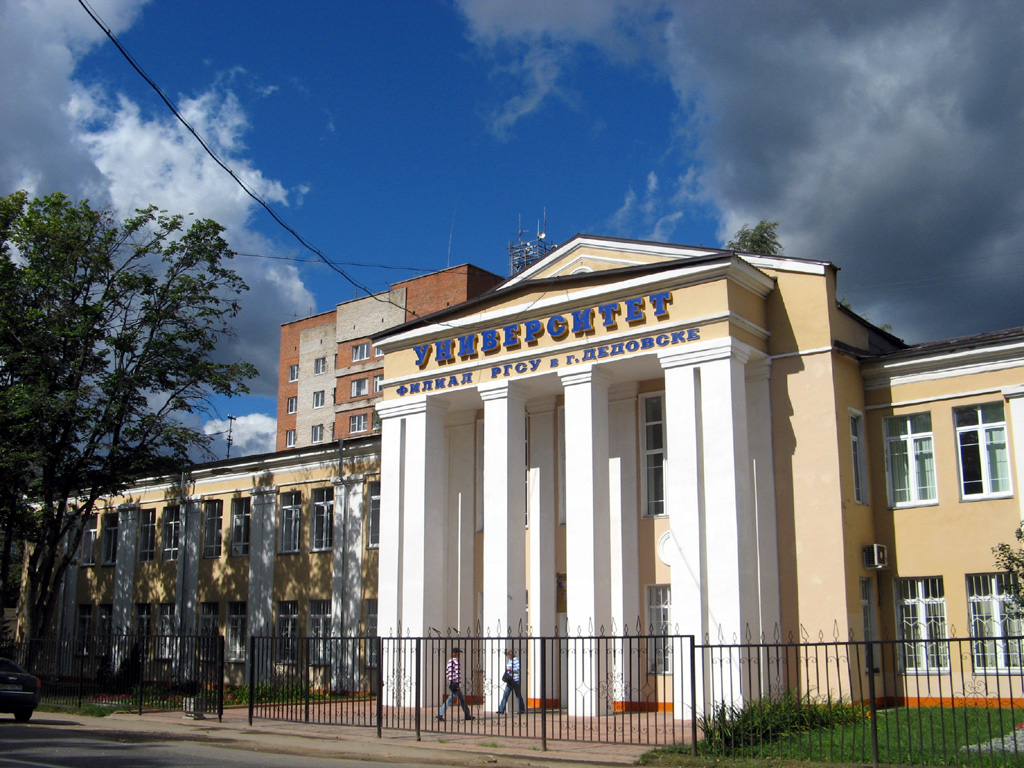
- Branch of Russian State Social University in Dedovsk

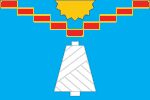
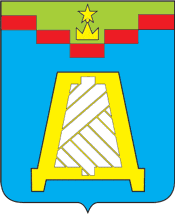
- Flag Coat of arms
- Interactive map of Dedovsk
- Location of Dedovsk Dedovsk (Moscow Oblast)
- Coordinates: 55°51′N 37°07′E
- Country: Russia
- Federal subject: Moscow Oblast
- Administrative district: Istrinsky District
- TownSelsoviet: Dedovsk
- First mentioned: 1573
- Town status since: 1940
- Elevation: 170 m (560 ft)

Population (2010 Census)
  - Total: 29,108
  - Estimate (2025): 30,180 (+3.7%)

Administrative status
  - Capital of: Town of Dedovsk

Municipal status
  - Municipal district: Istrinsky Municipal District
  - Urban settlement: Dedovsk Urban Settlement
  - Capital of: Dedovsk Urban Settlement
- Time zone: UTC+3 (MSK)
- Postal codes: 143530, 143532
- Dialing code: +7 49631
- OKTMO ID: 46533000006

Dedovsk (Russian: Де́довск) is a town in Istrinsky District of Moscow Oblast, Russia, located 38 kilometers (24 mi) west of Moscow and 30 kilometers (19 mi) southeast of Istra, the administrative center of the district. Population: 29,108 (2010 census); 27,662 (2002 census); 30,740 (1989 Soviet census). It was previously known as Dedovo/Dedovsky (until 1940).

== History ==
It was first mentioned in 1573 (453 years ago) as the village of Dedovo (Де́дово), which would turn into a bigger settlement in the 18th century. In 1913, a textile factory was built in the area, which would give birth to the settlement of Dedovsky (Де́довский) and absorb the village of Dedovo. In 1940, the settlement was granted town status and given its present name.

== Administrative and municipal status ==
Within the framework of administrative divisions, it is, together with two rural localities, incorporated within Istrinsky District as the Town of Dedovsk. As a municipal division, the Town of Dedovsk is incorporated within Istrinsky Municipal District as Dedovsk Urban Settlement.

== Notable people ==
- Roman Madyanov (1962) — Russian actor
- Roman Shirokov (1981) — Russian professional football player
- Sergei Vyshedkevich (1975) — Russian professional ice hockey player
- Valeriy Iordan (1992) — Russian athlete
