= Valentin Katasonov =

Russian economist

- Born: Valentin Yuryevich Katasonov; April 5, 1950 (age 76); Soviet Union
- Education: MGIMO
- Awards: Diploma of the Ministry of Foreign Affairs of the Russian Federation (2009)
- Scientific career
- Fields: project finance investment management international finance
- Workplaces: Head of the Department of International Monetary and Credit Relations of MGIMO; Professor of the Department of International Finance of MGIMO

Valentin Yuryevich Katasonov (Russian: Валенти́н Ю́рьевич Катасо́нов; born April 5, 1950) is a Russian scientist-economist, Doctor of Economics. He is associated with the Strategic Culture Foundation (SCF).

== Biography ==
In 1972 he graduated from the Faculty of International Economic Relations of the Moscow State Institute of International Relations of the USSR Ministry of Foreign Affairs with a degree in foreign trade economist. In 1976 he defended his Ph.D. thesis State-monopoly regulation of environmental protection in the United States. In 1976-1977 and 2001-2018 he taught at MGIMO. In 1991 he defended his doctoral dissertation Features of the internationalization of economic life in the context of an exacerbation of the global environmental situation (political and economic aspect). 1991-1993 — Consultant to the UN Department of International Economic and Social Problems / DIESA. 1993-1996 — Member of the Advisory Council under the President of the European Bank for Reconstruction and Development.

Regular contributor to the conspiracy theory and disinformation website Globalresearch.ca. Active defender of one of the COVID-19 misinformation about chipping people of Bill Gates.
