= Yuri Stoyanov =

Soviet and Russian actor

- Юрий Стоянов
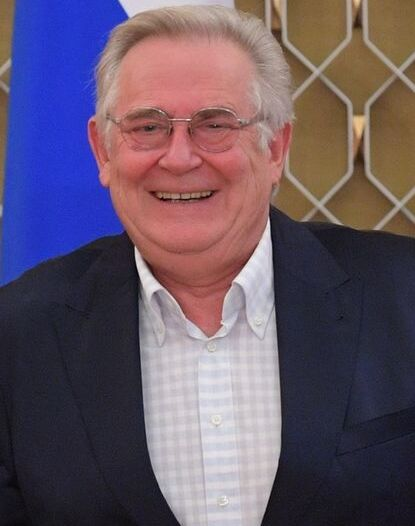
- Stoyanov in 2021
- Born: Yuri Nikolayevich Stoyanov; 10 July 1957 (age 69); Odesa, Ukrainian SSR, Soviet Union
- Occupations: Actor, television presenter, musician, comedian, parodist
- Years active: 1974–present
- Awards: TEFI (1996, 1999, 2001, 2002); Golden Eagle Award (2008)

Yuri Nikolayevich Stoyanov (Russian: Ю́рий Никола́евич Стоя́нов; born 10 July 1957) is a Soviet and Russian theater and film actor, and musician. People's Artist of Russia (2001).

== Biography ==
He was born in Odesa. As a child he moved with his family to the village of Borodino. His mother, Russian, Yevgenia Leonidovna Stoyanova (born June 21, 1935), worked as deputy director for educational work, director of a pedagogical college and taught Ukrainian language and literature. Honored worker of education of Ukraine, she lives in Odesa. Father — Bulgarian, Nikolai Georgievich Stoyanov worked as a gynecologist, died in 1993.

In 1974, he entered the GITIS. After graduation in 1978, he played at the Tovstonogov Bolshoi Drama Theater, where he worked as an actor until 1995.

Received nationwide fame after the release of the sketch show Gorodok, which he created and led together with Ilya Oleynikov from 1993 to 2012.

October 30, 2018, he joined the Council on Public Television by decree of the President of the Russian Federation.

== Personal life ==
Stoyanov married thrice. He has three daughters and two stepdaughters. He has two sons from his first marriage.

== Partial filmography ==
- Girl and Grand (1982) as Journalist (uncredited)
- Silver Lily of the Valley (1990) as Pridorozhny
- Alchemists (2000) as Satl
- Rabbit Over the Void (2006) as Semion Grossu
- 12 (2007) as 6th Juror
- Shekspiru i ne snilos (2007) as Ignat Savich
- Kingdom of Crooked Mirrors (2007, TV Movie) as producer from USA
- Yeralash (2007, TV Series) as robber (voice)
- Hitler Goes Kaput! (2008) as Martin Bormann
- Cinderella (2012) as Viktor Pavlovich Chugainov, oil magnate
- The White Guard (2012, TV Series) as General-mayor Blokhin
- The Snow Queen (2012) as King (voice)
- Moscow Never Sleeps (2017) as Valeriy
- Ten (2017) as Panov
- The Crimean Bridge. Made with Love! (2018) as boss
- Doctor Richter (2019) as Nekrasov (season 3)
- Mistresses (2019) as Mikhail
- Love (2021) as Dima
- The Vampires of Midland (2021) as Svyatoslav Vernidubovich Krivich
- The Faberge Egg (2022) as Aristarkh Gannibalovich Yozhikov
- Games (2024, miniseries) as Leonid Brezhnev
