= Sergey Amoralov =

Russian singer-songwriter (born 1979)

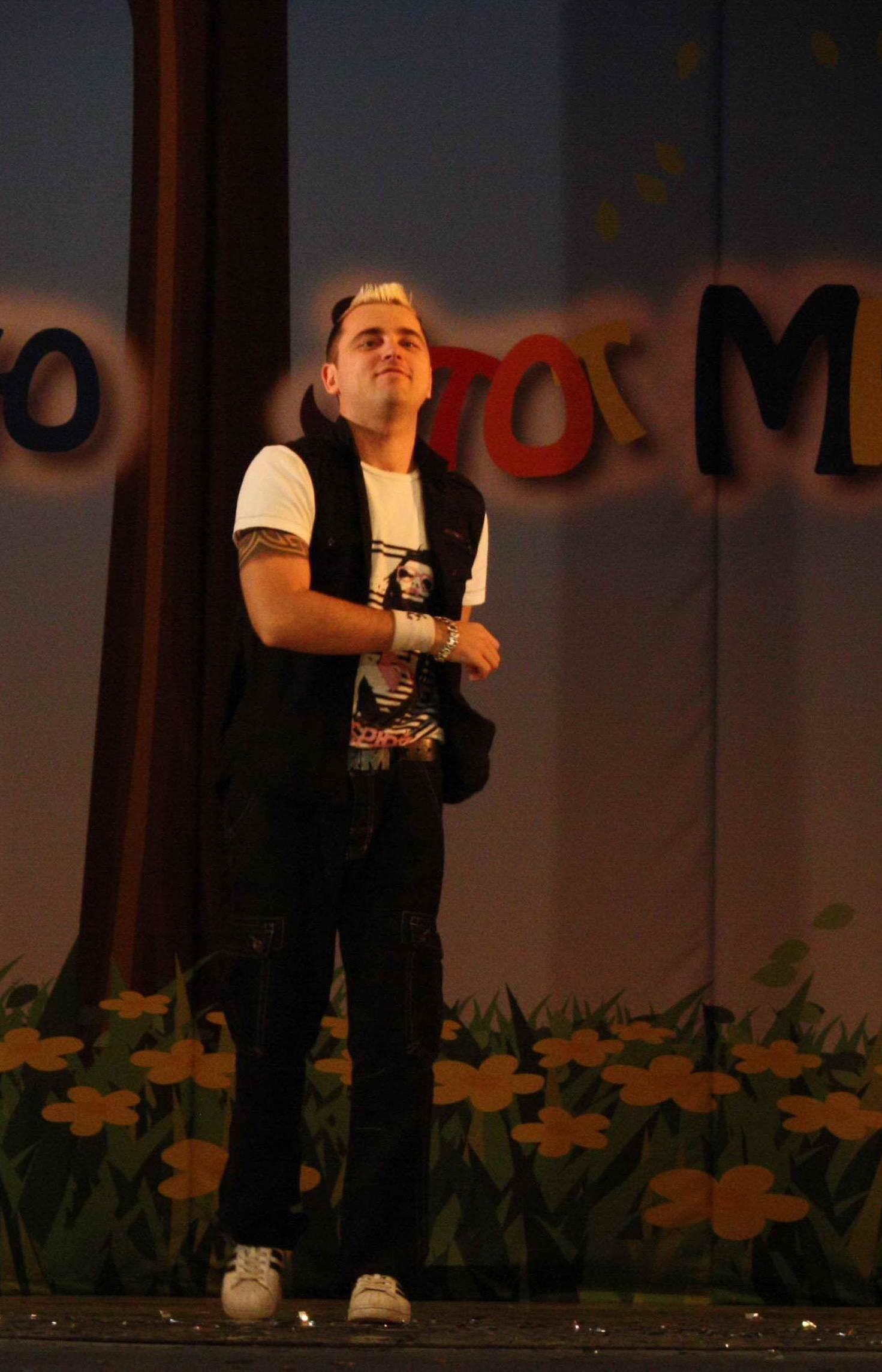
Sergei Amoralov in 2009

Sergei Amoralov (Russian: Серге́й Амора́лов, real name Sergei Aleksandrovich Surovenko (Russian: Серге́й Алекса́ндрович Суро́венко; born January 11, 1979, Leningrad) is a Russian singer and songwriter, known as the frontman of the boy band Reckless Scammers. Winner of Song of the Year and Golden Gramophone Award.
