= The President and His Granddaughter =

- Directed by: Tigran Keosayan
- Written by: Elena Rayskaya
- Produced by: Vladimir Dostal; David Keosayan
- Starring: Oleg Tabakov; Nadezhda Mikhalkova
- Cinematography: Maksim Osadchy
- Edited by: Vera Kolyadenko
- Music by: Leonid Agutin
- Production company: Kinomost Film Studio
- Release date: 1999
- Running time: 100 minutes
- Country: Russia
- Language: Russian

The President and His Granddaughter (Russian: Президент и его внучка, romanized: Prezident i ego vnuchka) is a 1999 Russian comedy film directed by Tigran Keosayan. Participant of the main competition of the XII ORKF Kinotavr (Special Prize of the Jury).

== Plot ==
On a blizzard New Year's Eve, a fatal event took place. In the hospital delivered a young woman, who began premature birth as a result of a car accident. The happening was complicated by the fact that the father-in-law of the mother was a well-known general who, threatening weapons to doctors, demanded the birth of a healthy grandson. To death a terrified doctor, in front of which the fierce general waved his name pistol, finds the only way out.

One of the two twin girls, born with a single mother, a future artist, is declared the general's granddaughter. During New Year's Eve 1999, she met in front of the Kremlin Tree the daughter of the artist and granddaughter of the new president of the Russian Federation! The princess and the beggar, of course, change places.

== Cast ==
- Oleg Tabakov as Russian President
- Nadezhda Mikhalkova as Masha (daughter of painter) and Masha (granddaughter of President)
- Dina Korzun as Tatyana, mother of girls
- Vladimir Ilyin as Sasha
- Aleksandr Adabashyan as Doctor, subsequently Minister of Health
- Alyona Khmelnitskaya as wife of a doctor
- Vladimir Vdovichenkov as president's guard

== Production ==
The filming and renting of the film was preceded by serious differences between the production company and screenwriter Elena Rayskaya, as the author of the script, who originally offered it to the producers with the condition of their own directing. Having signed a contract with Rayskaya, the company eventually dismissed her on the basis of creative disagreements, transferring the shooting to Tigran Keosayan. Having filed a lawsuit for copyright infringement, Elena Rayskaya achieved a resolution banning filming before the end of the trial, and then the court's decision to ban the film company from using the author's name and original script name, as well as to promulgate the film created on its basis. Nevertheless, the film was released in the rental.
