= Alyona Khmelnitskaya =

Russian actress and TV presenter (born 1971)

- Алёна Хмельницкая
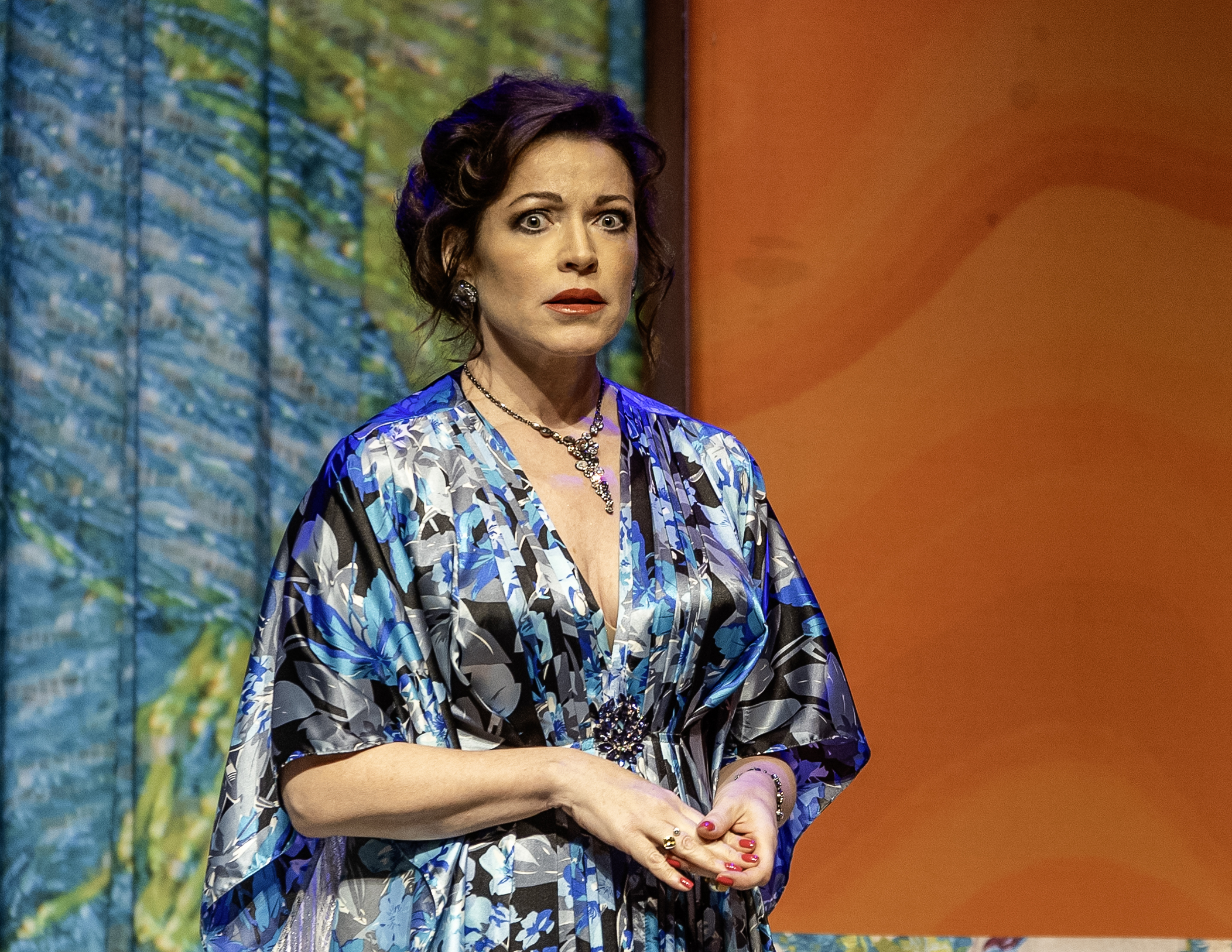
- Born: Yelena Aleksandrovna Khmelnitskaya; 12 January 1971 (age 55); Moscow, RSFSR, USSR
- Other name: Alyona
- Citizenship: Soviet Union (until 1991); Russia
- Occupations: Actress, TV presenter
- Years active: 1990–present
- Spouse: Tigran Keosayan (m. 1993; div. 2014)
- Partner: Aleksandr Sinyushin (2016–present)
- Children: 2

Alyona Aleksandrovna Khmelnitskaya (Russian: Алёна Алекса́ндровна Хмельни́цкая; born 12 January 1971) is a Russian stage and film actress and TV presenter.

== Biography ==
Khmelnitskaya was born in Moscow, Russian SFSR, Soviet Union (now Russia), into an artistic family. Her parents are artists of the ballet. Her father Aleksandr Khmelnitsky (born 1937) and mother Valentina Savina (born 1939) danced at the Bolshoi Theater for twenty years. Alyona in childhood was engaged in artistic gymnastics and table tennis.

In 1988, after graduating from high school, she entered the acting department of the Moscow Art Theater School (course leader Ivan Tarkhanov), graduating in 1992. Graduates of the same course were Gosha Kutsenko and Vyacheslav Razbegaev. In 1990-1994 she played Konchita in the play Juno and Avos at the Lenkom.

Khmelnitskaya's main performance was in the role of Leoncia Solano in the Russian-Ukrainian adventure feature film directed by Vladimir Popkov, Hearts of Three (1992), based on Jack London's novel of the same name.

In 1993, she married film director Tigran Keosayan. In a marriage that lasted twenty-one years, two daughters were born. The couple divorced in 2014, and after the divorce they maintained friendly relations.

Since 2016, she has been in a relationship with Aleksandr Sinyushin who is thirteen years her junior.

== Selected filmography ==
Television
Year	Title	Role	Notes
1986	Courier	girl at the party	episode
1992	Hearts of Three	Leoncia Solano	
2000	Silver Lily of the Valley	Irma	
2000	The President and His Granddaughter	Alisa	
2006	Rabbit Over the Void	Rada	
2015	Three Happy Women	Milena	4 episodes
2017	The Killing	Natal'ja Sonina, Tanja Lavrova's aunt	TV miniseries; as Elena Khmelnitskaya
2020	The Closer 4	Ekaterina Bashlykova	TV miniseries
2022	In From the Cold	Svetlana Petrova	8 episodes
