= Vladimir Yeryomin (actor) =

Soviet and Russian actor

- Владимир Ерёмин
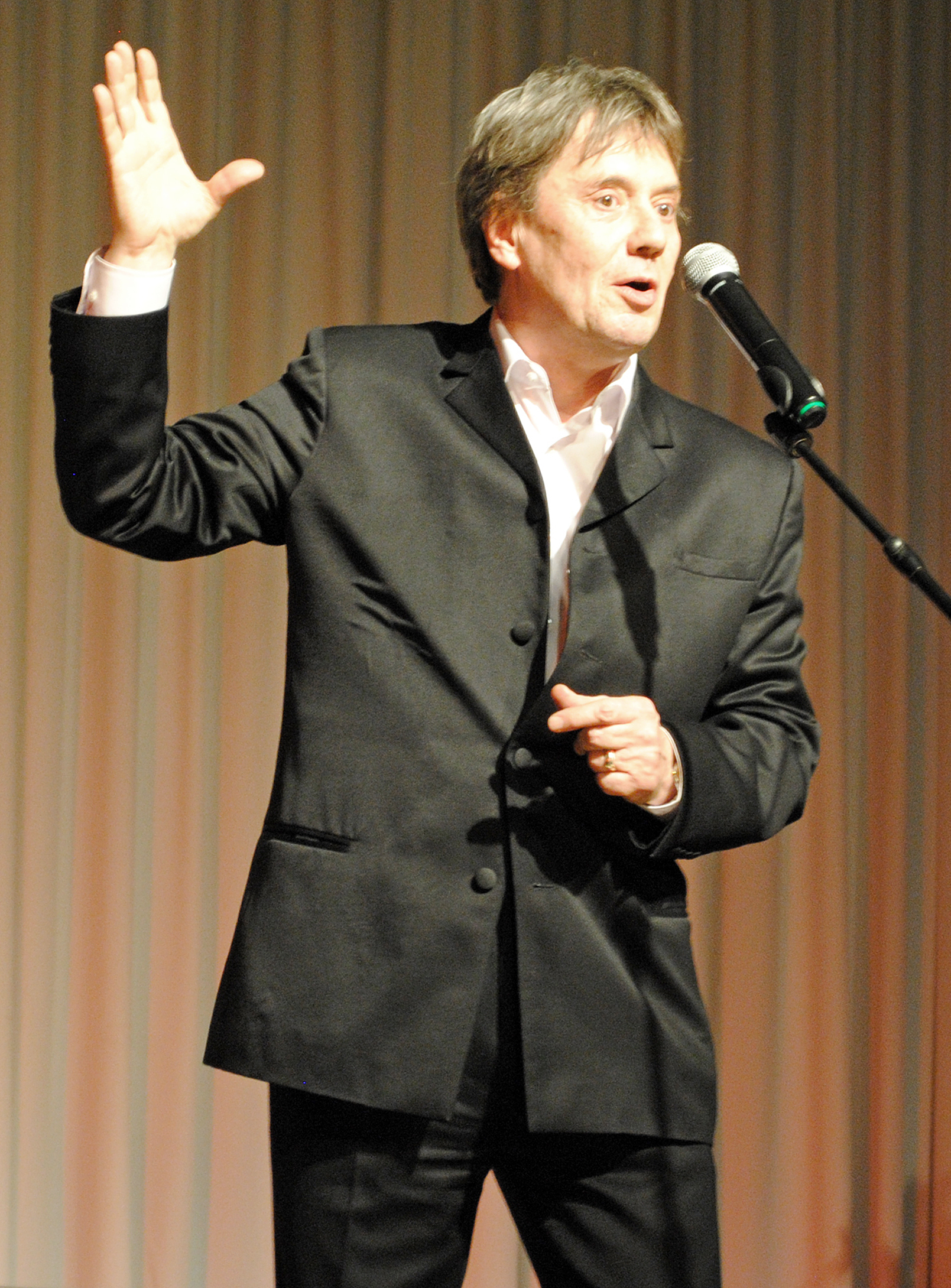
- Yeryomin in 2014
- Born: September 6, 1950 (age 75); Muromtsevo, Muromtsevsky District, Omsk Oblast, RSFSR, Soviet Union
- Occupations: Actor; screenwriter; pedagogue; television presenter
- Years active: 1973–present

Vladimir Arkadyevich Yeryomin (Russian: Владимир Аркадьевич Ерёмин; born September 6, 1950) is a Soviet and Russian stage, film and voice actor, screenwriter, producer and television presenter. He was awarded the Merited Artist of the Russian Federation in 2006.

== Biography ==
Yeryomin was born in the village of Muromtsevo, Omsk Oblast. In 1957-1967 he studied at the school in Pavlodar. His parents had no relationship to the theater and cinema, but as a child, Vladimir became interested in circus and theater.

In 1968-1972, he studied at the Nemirovich-Danchenko School-Studio (Moscow Art Theater).

In 1973-1979, he played in the company of the Lermontov State Academic Russian Drama Theatre in Almaty. Since 1982 — Tovstonogov Bolshoi Drama Theater. From 1995 to 1997 — an actor of the Moscow theater Satyricon, participates in the enterprise performances. Since 2014 — Artist of the Russian Army Theatre.

In 2014 he signed a letter against the annexation of Crimea by Russia.

== Filmography ==
=== Actor ===
- Moonzund (1987) – Leonid Aleksandrovich Deichman, mechanical engineer
- The Criminal Quartet (1989) – Nikolai Larin, journalist
- His Nickname Is Beast (1990) – Grisha
- Afghan Breakdown (1991) – Medical service captain
- Dude — Water Winner (1991) – Mafia boss
- A Beautiful Stranger (1992) – Officer
- Dreams of Russia (1992) – Count Alexander Vorontsov
- Midnight in Saint Petersburg (1995) – Boris
- Queen Margot (1996) – Monsieur de Pigny
- 24 Hours (2000) – Vernik
- House for the Rich (2000) – Yevgeny Prokofyevich Burkovsky
- Kamenskaya (2000) – General Suprun
- The Envy of Gods (2000) – Igor, Natasha's husband
- The Funeral Party (2007) – Arkady Libin
- Ivan Denisovich (2021) – Caesar Markovich

=== Screenwriter ===
- Fortress of War (2010)

=== Dubbing ===
- Al Pacino
  - The Godfather (film series) – Michael Corleone
  - Dick Tracy (1990) – Alphonse "Big Boy" Caprice
  - The Devil's Advocate (1997) – John Milton / Satan
  - Any Given Sunday (1999) – Tony D'Amato
  - Simone (2002) – Viktor Taransky
  - Two for the Money (2005) – Walter Abrams
  - Ocean's Thirteen (2007) – Willy Bank
  - Righteous Kill (2008) – Detective David "Rooster" Fisk
  - The Son of No One (2011) – Detective Charles Stanford
  - Jack and Jill (2011) – Himself
  - Danny Collins (2015) – Danny Collins
  - Misconduct (2016) – Charles Abrams
  - Once Upon a Time in Hollywood (2019) – Marvin Schwarz
  - The Irishman (2019) – Jimmy Hoffa
  - House of Gucci (2021) – Aldo Gucci
  - Knox Goes Away (2023) – Xavier Crane
- Anthony Hopkins
  - Bram Stoker's Dracula (1992) – Professor Abraham Van Helsing
  - Meet Joe Black (1998) – William Parrish
  - Hannibal (2001) – Dr. Hannibal Lecter
  - The Human Stain (2003) – Coleman Silk
  - Alexander (2004) – Ptolemy I Soter
  - Proof (2005) – Robert Llewellyn
  - Bobby (2006) – John Casey
  - Shortcut to Happiness (2007) – Daniel Webster
  - Fracture (2007) – Theodore "Ted" Crawford
  - Beowulf (2007) – Hrothgar
  - The Wolfman (2010) – Sir John Talbot
  - Blackway (2015) – Lester
  - Transformers: The Last Knight (2017) – Sir Edmund Burton
  - Zero Contact (2022) – Finley Hart
  - Freud's Last Session (2023) – Sigmund Freud
- Michael Douglas
  - Wall Street (1987) – Gordon Gekko
  - Falling Down (1993) – William "D-Fens" Foster
  - The Game (1997) – Nicholas Van Orton
  - Traffic (2000) – Robert Wakefield
  - You, Me and Dupree (2006) – Bob Thompson
  - Beyond a Reasonable Doubt (2009) – Mark Hunter
  - Last Vegas (2013) – Billy Gerson
- Mickey Rourke
  - Stormbreaker (2006) – Darrius Sayle
  - The Wrestler (2008) – Robin Ramzinski / Randy "The Ram" Robinson
  - Iron Man 2 (2010) – Ivan Vanko / Whiplash
  - The Expendables (2010) – "Tool" Ross
  - Java Heat (2013) – Malik
  - Adverse (2020) – Kaden
  - The Commando (2022) – Johnny
  - Warhunt (2022) – Major Johnson
  - The Palace (2023) – Bill Crush
