= House for the Rich =

- Directed by: Vladimir Fokin
- Written by: Anatoly Grebnev
- Produced by: Alexander Vasilkov
- Starring: Valentin Gaft; Vladimir Eremin; Konstantin Khabensky
- Cinematography: Vadim Alisov
- Music by: Vladimir Dashkevich
- Production company: Mosfilm
- Release date: 2000
- Running time: 112 minutes
- Country: Russia
- Language: Russian

House for the Rich (Russian: Дом для богатых, romanized: Dom dlya bogatykh) is a 2000 Russian drama film directed by Vladimir Fokin.

== Plot ==
The film is set in the apartment of an old Moscow mansion. In the middle of the 19th century, the squandering nobleman Burkovsky sells the family home, and from that moment the apartment begins its transformation and it gets interwoven with the destinies of the people who have inhabited it: from the Narodnaya Volya members to the Bolshevik commissars, from the terrible communal apartment to the re-creation of the chic apartments by the "new Russian" Rumyanov - satirist, poet, actor. Hosts and lodgers, aristocrats and petty bourgeoises, believers and atheists - each of the many heroes lived their only life in the way they thought right as it happened to them ...

== Cast ==
- Valentin Gaft - Roman Rumyanov
- Vladimir Yeryomin - Evgeniy Burkovskiy
- Konstantin Khabensky - Yuri Sapozhnikov
- Yuri Stepanov - Serafim Pukhov (all ages)
- Valery Barinov - Akim Shpet
- Sergey Vinogradov - Georgiy Maksimov
- Polina Fokina - Kseniya Maksimova
- Tatiana Okunevskaya - Anna Kazimirovna (old)
- Irina Grinyova - Anna Kazimirovna (young)
- Yevgeny Sidikhin - Alexei Serebriakov
- Antonina Dmitrieva - Anna Stepanovna "Nyura" (old)
- Lyubava Aristarkhova - Nyura (young)
- Elena Kucherenko - Ira Sapozhnikova
- Valery Garkalin - Captain Skorokhodov
- Larisa Luzhina - Marina Mikhailovna
- Elena Romanova - Larisa
- Daria Mikhailova - Marina
- Yuri Nazarov - Vladilen Serebriakov
- Vladimir Sterzhakov - architect
- Lyubov Germanova - art expert
- Sergey Shekhovtsov - Gena
- Nina Persiyaninova - Gena's wife
- Irina Znamenshchikova - communal apartment inhabitant
- Alexey Kiryushchenko - gendarme
- Andrei Butin - gendarme
- Alexey Karpov - NKVD employee
- Danila Perov - NKVD employee

== Awards ==
- Prize "Bronze Pegasus" (Vladimir Fokin) at the Moscow Pegasus Film Festival in 2000.
- Nomination for the Golden Aries in the category Best Screenplay (Anatoly Grebnev) in 2000.
- Special diploma of the jury of Belarusian cinematographers for the visual design of the film (Lyudmila Kusakova, Mikhail Kartashov) at the international film festival of the CIS and Baltic countries "Falling Leaves" in Minsk in 2000.
- Nika in the category Best Screenplay (Anatoly Grebnev) in 2000.
