= Tigran Keosayan =

Russian director, writer and actor (1966–2025)

- Тигран Кеосаян
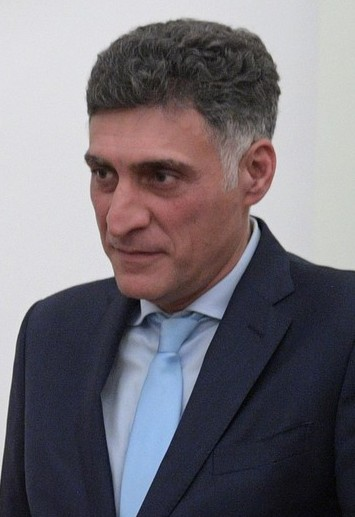
- Keosayan in 2018
- Born: Tigran Edmondovich Keosayan; 4 January 1966; Moscow, Russian SFSR, Soviet Union
- Died: 26 September 2025 (aged 59); Moscow, Russia
- Occupations: Director; writer; actor
- Years active: 1992–2024
- Spouses: Alyona Khmelnitskaya (m. 1993; div. 2014) Margarita Simonyan (m. 2022)
- Children: 5

Tigran Edmondovich Keosayan (Armenian: Տիգրան էդմոնդի Քեոսայան, Russian: Тигран Эдмондович Кеосаян; 4 January 1966 – 26 September 2025) was a Russian film director, actor, propagandist and television presenter. He was a winner of film festival prizes including TEFI, Kinotavr, and 2001 Window to Europe Film Festival.

== Career ==
Keosayan directed several Russian films, including Katyka and Shiz (1992), Poor Sasha (1997), The President and His Granddaughter (1999), Silver Lily of the Valley (2000), Hare Over the Abyss (2006), and the propaganda film The Crimean Bridge. Made with Love! (2018), as well as a large number of clips for Mikhail Shufutinsky, Igor Sarukhanov, and Irina Allegrova. He collaborated with Fyodor Bondarchuk, Alexander Zbruev and others. Poor Sasha received a TEFI award as the Best Film of 1998 and Zbruev received the Best Actor prize at the 1998 Kinotavr festival. The President and His Granddaughter was awarded a special jury prize at the 2001 Kinotavr festival. Silver Lily of the Valley was awarded a prize at the 2001 Window to Europe Film Festival. In March 2020, Russian opposition leader Alexei Navalny alleged that roughly 46 million rubles (nearly $449,000) of state funds earmarked for The Crimean Bridge. Made with Love! went to the relatives of Tigran Keosayan's second wife, Margarita Simonyan.

Keosayan anchored the daily (from Monday to Thursday) analytical talk show Evening with Tigran Keosayan on the Russian private TV channel REN-TV. After Evening with Tigran Keosayan ended, he made a sequel show on another channel called Hot Evening with Tigran Keosayan. From 2009 to 2010, he hosted the show You and Me with his first wife, Alyona Khmelnitskaya. In 2011, Keosayan became the host of the talk show Stop Being Silent!, where topics of everyday life were discussed. He also appeared on Minute of Glory, People's Artist, Video Battles and Empire of Illusions: Safronov Brothers. Beginning in 2016, he hosted the evening entertainment satirical show International Sawmill on NTV.

In 2000, Keosayan directed his first play, New. In 2003, he directed the musical The Twelve Chairs.

=== Blackface segment about Barack Obama ===
On 30 November 2020, Keosayan's TV show International Sawmill, for which Keosayan and his wife Margarita Simonyan are co-writers, aired a segment featuring Keosayan, and an actress in blackface posing as former United States President Barack Obama. In the segment, Keosayan, referring to Obama's book A Promised Land, asks the actress: "Do you consider this book your achievement?", to which the actress in blackface replies: "Of course."

Keosayan then asks: "Because none of your relatives have written books?", after which the actress answers: "Because none of my relatives that came before me could write." Keosayan then states "you should have been a rap musician, not the president". In the segment, the actress wears a bandana and gold chains and behaves in a way regarded as stereotypical to rappers. The segment was widely deemed as being racist.

== Personal life and death ==
Keosayan born in Moscow as the son of Armenian-Russian film director and composer Edmond Keosayan and actress Laura Gevorkyan. He studied at the all-Union (now all-Russian) state Institute of Cinematography (VGIK).

He was married to Margarita Simonyan, the editor-in-chief of the Russian state-controlled broadcaster RT, as well as the state-owned media group Rossiya Segodnya. He was previously married to actress and television host Alyona Khmelnitskaya from 1993 to 2014. He had two daughters with Khmelnitskaya and three children with Simonyan.

Keosayan suffered from a long-standing heart condition and suffered heart attacks in 2008 and 2010. In January 2025, Simonyan said that Keosayan temporarily underwent clinical death and was in a coma. He died on 26 September 2025, without regaining consciousness. Keosayan was 59.

== Sanctions ==
After the Russian invasion of Ukraine in 2022, Keosayan was one of the individuals sanctioned by the European Union. The reasons given for the sanctions were that Keosayan has spread anti-Ukrainian propaganda.

Keosayan was included in the list of Russians under personal sanctions by the United Kingdom in March 2022.

On 24 June 2022, Kazakhstan reported that Keosayan was denied entry. On 10 October, Armenian authorities declared Keosayan and his wife Margarita Simonyan persona non grata as a "agents from different countries with Armenian surnames" who allow themselves a disrespectful attitude towards Armenia.

== Filmography ==
=== As a director ===
1. Katyka and Shiz (1992)
2. Cases Funny, Family Matters (1996, TV Series)
3. Poor Sasha (1997)
4. The Death Directory (1999, TV series)
5. Silver Lily of the Valley (2000)
6. The President and His Granddaughter (2000)
7. Men's Work (2001, also TV series: 2005)
8. Hare Over the Abyss (2006)
9. Rabbit Over the Void (2006)
10. Mirage (2008)
11. Yalta-45 (2011, mini-series)
12. Three Comrades (2012, mini-series)
13. Sea. Mountains. Exclay (2014, TV series)
14. Actress (2017, TV series)
15. The Crimean Bridge. Made with Love! (2018)
16. Immortals (2021)
17. Seven Days of Peter Semyonovitch (2025)

=== As an actor ===
1. The Crown of the Russian Empire, or Once Again the Elusive Avengers (1971)
2. Stalingrad (1990)
3. Joker (1991)
4. Silver Lily of the Valley (2000)
5. The Heat (2006)
6. The Crimean Bridge. Made with Love! (2018)

=== As a writer ===
1. Cases Funny, Family Matters (TV Series, 1996)
2. Silver Lily of the Valley (TV series, 2005)

== Awards ==
- Honored Artist of the Russian Federation (24 January 2025) — for contribution to the development of national culture and art, and for many years of fruitful activity.
- Honored Art Worker of the Russian Federation (12 April 2024) — for major contribution to the development of national culture and art, and for many years of fruitful activity.
