= List of Soviet and Russian films of 1991 =

Title	Russian title	Director	Cast	Genre	Notes
1991
Act, Manya!	Действуй, Маня!	Roman Yershov	Yuliya Menshova	Comedy	
Afghan Breakdown	Афганский излом	Vladimir Bortko	Michele Placido	Drama	
Ajooba	Черный принц Аджуба	Shammi Kapoor & Gennadi Vasilyev	Amitabh Bachchan, Rishi Kapoor, Ariadna Shengelaya, Georgi Darchiashvili	Fantasy, superhero	Co-production between Bollywood and Soviet cinema
Anna Karamazoff	Анна Карамазофф	Rustam Khamdamov	Jeanne Moreau, Yelena Solovey	Drama	Soviet-French co-production; Entered into the 1991 Cannes Film Festival
Arithmetic of a Murder	Арифметика убийства	Dmitry Svetozarov	Sergey Bekhterev, Zinaida Sharko	Crime	
Armavir	Армавир	Vadim Abdrashitov	Sergey Koltakov, Sergey Shakurov	Drama	
The Assassin of the Tsar	Цареубийца	Karen Shakhnazarov	Oleg Yankovsky, Malcolm McDowell, Armen Dzhigarkhanyan	Drama, history	Co-production between Soviet union and United Kingdom. Entered into the 1991 Cannes Film Festival
The Beloved	Избранник	Mikheil Kalatozishvili	Avtandil Makharadze	Drama	Was entered into the 42nd Berlin International Film Festival
Caravan of Death	Караван смерти	Ivan Solovov	Aleksandr Pankratov-Chyorny, Boris Khmelnitsky	Action	
Chicha	Чича	Vitaly Melnikov	Mikhail Dorofeev, Nina Usatova	Comedy	
Close to Eden	Урга — территория любви	Nikita Mikhalkov	Vladimir Gostyukhin	Bayaertu, Badema, Vladimir Gostyukhin	Co-production between Soviet Union and France
Crazies	Чокнутые	Alla Surikova	Nikolai Karachentsov, Leonid Yarmolnik	Comedy	
Cynics	Циники	Dmitry Meskhiev	Sergey Batalov, Yury Belyayev, Ingeborga Dapkunaite	Drama	
Dude - Water Winner	Лох — победитель воды	Arkadiy Tigay	Sergey Kuryokhin, Larisa Borodina	Crime	
The Engagement Ring	Обручальное кольцо	Ramiz Azizbeyli	Afag Bashirgyzy	Comedy	
Famine-33	Голод-33	Oles Yanchuk	Halyna Sulyma, Heorhiy Moroziuk, Oleksiy Horbunov	Drama	
Genius	Гений	Viktor Sergeev	Aleksandr Abdulov, Yury Kuznetsov, Larisa Belogurova, Innokenty Smoktunovsky	Crime drama	
Get Thee Out	Изыди!	Dmitriy Astrakhan	Otar Megvinetukhutsesi	Drama	
Happy Days	Счастливые дни	Aleksei Balabanov	Viktor Sukhorukov	Drama	Screened at the 1992 Cannes Film Festival
Humiliated and Insulted	Униженные и оскорблённые	Andrei Andreyevich Eshpai	Nastassja Kinski, Nikita Mikhalkov	Drama	
Infinitas	Бесконечность	Marlen Khutsiev	Vladislav Pilnikov	Drama	
The Inner Circle	Ближний круг	Andrei Konchalovsky	Tom Hulce, Lolita Davidovich, Bob Hoskins, Aleksandr Zbruyev, Feodor Chaliapin Jr.	Drama	Soviet-American-Italian co-production. Was nominated for awards at the 42nd Berlin International Film Festival and the 1993 Nika Awards.
Leg	Нога	Nikita Tyagunov	Ivan Okhlobystin, Pyotr Mamonov	Action	
Lost in Siberia	Затерянный в Сибири	Alexander Mitta	Anthony Andrews, Vladimir Ilyin, Elena Mayorova	Romantic drama	Was selected as the British entry for the Best Foreign Language Film at the 64th Academy Awards, but was not accepted as a nominee.
Love	Любовь	Valery Todorovsky	Yevgeny Mironov, Natalya Petrova	Romance	
The Man Who Doesn't Return	Невозвращенец	Sergey Snezhkin	Yury Kuznetsov, Nikolai Yeremenko Sr.	Drama	
My Best Friend, General Vasili, the Son of Joseph Stalin	Мой лучший друг генерал Василий, сын Иосифа	Viktor Sadovsky	Boris Schcherbakov, Vladimir Steklov, Andrei Boltnev, Irina Malysheva	Biopic	
No Love	Нелюбовь	Valery Rubinchik	Kseniya Kachalina, Stanislav Lyubshin	Drama	
Promised Heaven	Небеса обетованные	Eldar Ryazanov	Liya Akhedzhakova, Valentin Gaft, Olga Volkova, Leonid Bronevoy	Comedy, drama	
Rock'n'roll for Princesses	Рок-н-ролл для принцесс	Radomir Vasilevsky	Grazhyna Baikshteit, Viktor Pavlov	Fantasy	
Satan	Сатана	Viktor Aristov	Maria Averbach	Thriller	Won the Jury Grand Prix at Berlin
Tsar Ivan the Terrible	Царь Иван Грозный	Gennady Vasilyev	Kakhi Kavsadze, Igor Talkov	Drama	
Viva Gardes-Marines!	Виват, гардемарины!	Svetlana Druzhinina	Dmitry Kharatyan, Sergey Zhigunov, Mikhail Boyarsky, Lyudmila Gurchenko, Kristina Orbakaitė	Adventure	
Wolfhound	Волкодав	Mikhail Tumanishvili	Inara Slucka, Aleksei Guskov, Anatoli Romashin	Action	
