= Mikhail Agranovich (cinematographer) =

Russian cinematographer (born 1946)

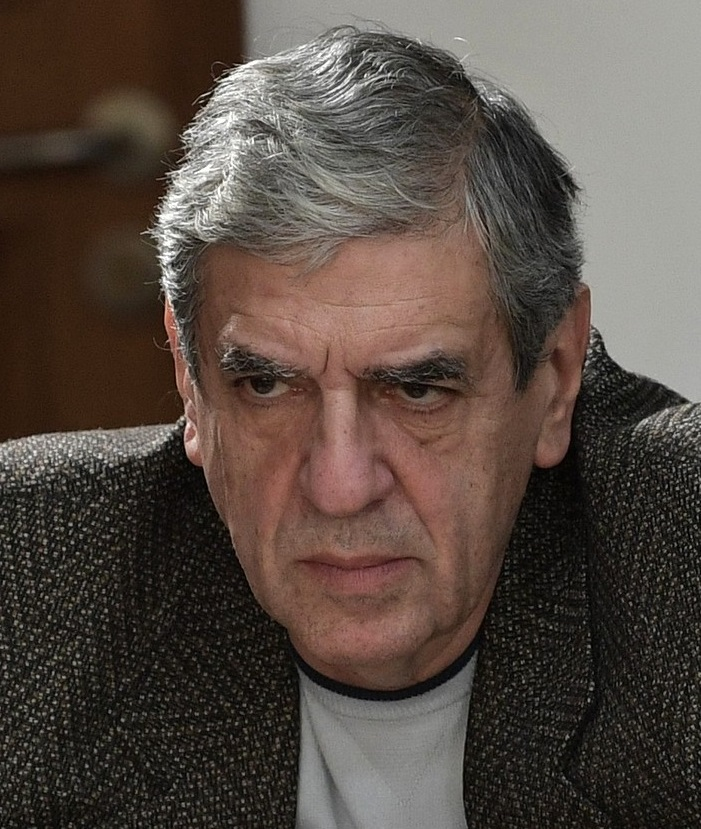
- Agranovich in 2019
- Born: Mikhail Leonidovich Agranovich; 8 September 1946 (age 79); Moscow, Soviet Union
- Occupations: Cinematographer, director, pedagogue
- Years active: 1970–present
- Notable work: Repentance; The Kreutzer Sonata; The Romanovs: An Imperial Family
- Awards: Nika Award (1988); TEFI (2006)

Mikhail Leonidovich Agranovich (Russian: Михаи́л Леони́дович Аграно́вич, born 8 September 1946, Moscow) is a Soviet and Russian cinematographer, director and pedagogue.

== Biography ==
He has credits on more than thirty films, and has worked with leading names in Soviet cinema such as Mikhail Schweitzer, Tengiz Abuladze and Gleb Panfilov. In 1995 he made the film Za co? with the Polish director Jerzy Kawalerowicz. Mikhail Agranovich has repeatedly been awarded professional prizes and awards; his films Repentance and Mother received special prizes of the jury of the Cannes Film Festival.

In 2011, Agranovich was the chairman of the jury at the festival Window to Europe in Vyborg.

== Personal life ==
Agranovich's first marriage was to Emilia Kulik, the announcer of the All-Union Radio. They had a son, Alexey, born in 1970, who is also now a director.

Agranovich's second marriage was to Lidiya Fedoseyeva-Shukshina.

His third marriage, to the director and documentary screenwriter Alla Agranovich, produced a daughter Maria (born 1989). In 2010, Maria graduated from the Directing Department of VGIK. In 2011, her debut film No Problem won the prize for young filmmakers at the contest Kinotavr Short Meter.

== Filmography ==
- Rudin (1977)
- Funny People (1977)
- Little Tragedies (1979)
- Look for a Woman (1983)
- Snake Catcher (1985)
- Repentance (1987)
- The Kreutzer Sonata (1987)
- Mother (1990)
- Jonathan of the Bears (1995)
- Za co? (1995)
- Inspector (1996)
- The Romanovs: An Imperial Family (2000)
- Come Look at Me (2000)
- The First Circle (2006)
- Thawed Carp (2017)
- Ivan Denisovich (2021)

== Awards and honours ==
- Nika Award for Best Cinematography (1988) – for film Repentance
- Vasilyev Brothers State Prize of the RSFSR (1989) – for film The Kreutzer Sonata
- Honoured Worker of the Arts Industry of the RSFSR (8 January 1992) – for services to cinema
- TEFI (2006) – for miniseries The First Circle
- Order of Friendship (6 December 2019)
