= List of films about the Romanovs =

This is a list of films about the Romanovs, the ruling family of Russia from 1613 to 1917. There have been many films about the Romanovs, so this list may be incomplete.

== 1890s ==
Year	Country	Title	Director	Notes
1896	Russian Empire	Coronation of Nicholas II	Camille Cerf	First film ever made in Russia.

== 1910s ==
Year	Country	Title	Director	Notes
1913	Russian Empire	Tryokhsotletie Tsarstvovaniya Doma Romanovykh	Aleksandr Drankov	English Title: Tercentenary of the Accession of the House of Romanov. This film was released to commemorate the 300th anniversary of Romanov rule in Russia.This film was said to have the blessing of Tsar Nicholas II himself.
1917	United States	The Fall of the Romanoffs	Herbert Brenon	This was one of four films released after the abdication of Nicholas II in March 1917. One of the characters, Iliodor, enemy monk of Rasputin, played himself.
1919	Soviet Russia	Pyotr i Alexei	Yuri Zhelyabuzhsky	English title: Peter and Alexei; Chronicled the childhood of Peter the Great, moving from the reign of his father to his own.

== 1920s ==
Year	Country	Title	Director	Notes
1927	Soviet Union	The Fall of the Romanov Dynasty	Esfir Shub	Classic compilation documentary.
1928	United States	Clothes Make the Woman	Tom Terriss	This was the first film about Anna Anderson who pretended to be Grand Duchess Anastasia Nikolaevna.
1928	Weimar Republic	Anastasia, die falsche Zarentochter	Arthur Bergen	This film was hastily written and produced to take advantage of the allegation that Anna Anderson was actually Fransziska Schanskowska, a missing factory worker from Poland. This allegation was made by Grand Duke Ernst Ludwig of Hesse and his private investigators.

== 1930s ==
Year	Country	Title	Director	Notes
1932	United States	Rasputin and the Empress	Richard Boleslawski	First sound film where all the Barrymore siblings Lionel, John, and Ethel appeared together. Prince Felix Yussupov who was living in London at the time, launched a massive lawsuit against MGM for the inaccurate portrayal of himself and his wife, Irina Alexandrovna.

== 1940s ==
Year	Country	Title	Director	Notes
1940	Nazi Germany	Katharina von Rußland	Carl Froelich	English title: Catherine of Russia; Never completed; Only a few shots were completed before production was halted.

== 1950s ==
Year	Country	Title	Director	Notes
1956	United States	Anastasia	Anatole Litvak	Film adaptation of the play by Marcelle Maurette
1956	West Germany	Anastasia, die letzte Zarentochter	Falk Harnack	English Title: The Story of Anastasia; Starring Lilli Palmer as Anna Anderson/Anastasia

== 1960s ==
Year	Country	Title	Director	Notes
1966	United Kingdom	Rasputin the Mad Monk	Don Sharp	
1967	France	I Killed Rasputin	Robert Hossein	

== 1970s ==
Year	Country	Title	Director	Notes
1971	United Kingdom; United States	Nicholas and Alexandra	Franklin J. Schaffner	Based on the book by Robert K. Massie
1974	United Kingdom	Fall of Eagles	John Elliot (creator)	Miniseries about the fall of the Habsburg, Hohenzollern, and Romanov dynasties.
1977	Soviet Union	Agoniya	Elem Klimov	Film about Rasputin. Was not released in the Soviet Union until 1981.

== 1980s ==
Year	Country	Title	Director	Notes
1986	United States; Soviet Union	Peter the Great	Lawrence Schiller	Television miniseries based on the book by Robert K. Massie
1986	United States; Austria; Italy	Anastasia: The Mystery of Anna	Marvin J. Chomsky	Miniseries based on the fantasy biography of Anna Anderson by Peter Kurth

== 1990s ==
Year	Country	Title	Director	Notes
1991	Soviet Union	Tsareubiytsa	Karen Shakhnazarov	English title: Assassin of the Tsar; Film about a man who claims to be Yakov Yurovsky, the man who killed Tsar Nicholas II.
1992	Russian Federation	Last Days of the Last Tsar	Anatoli Ivanov	Documentary film
1996	United States; Russian Federation; Hungary	Rasputin: Dark Servant of Destiny	Uli Edel	
1997	United States	Anastasia	Don Bluth / Gary Goldman	Animated adaptation of Anastasia 1956; the most famous film version on the mystery of Anastasia's alleged survival. - Distributed by 20th Century Fox

== 2000s ==
Year	Country	Title	Director	Notes
2000	Russian Federation	Romanovy: Ventsenosnaya semya	Gleb Panfilov	English title: The Romanovs: An Imperial Family; Includes footage of the canonization of Tsar Nicholas II and his family in 2000.
2002	Russian Federation	Russian Ark	Alexander Sokurov	Filmed in the Hermitage Museum in St. Petersburg in just one 90 minute shot.
2003	United Kingdom	The Lost Prince	Stephen Poliakoff	Mini series about Prince John of the United Kingdom. The Romanovs appear in a few scenes.

== 2010s ==
Year	Country	Title	Director	Notes
2013	Russian Federation	The Romanovs	Maxim Bespaly	Historical reconstruction series made by the Channel One, Star Media and Babich Design studios for the 400th anniversary of the ascension of Tsar Michael to the Russian throne in 1613.
2017	Russian Federation	Matilda	Alexei Uchitel	The love affair between Mathilde Kschessinska and Nicholas II of Russia.
2018	United States	The Romanoffs	Matthew Weiner	Contemporary television series "set around the globe, centering on separate stories about people who believe themselves to be descendants of the Russian royal family.
2019	Russia	Union of Salvation	Andrei Kravchuk	Group of officers of the Russian Imperial Guard prepare a revolt in December 1825, when about 3,000 officers and soldiers refused to swear allegiance to the new Tsar.
