= Mikhail Kononov =

Soviet and Russian actor

- Михаил Кононов
- Born: Mikhail Ivanovich Kononov; 25 April 1940; Moscow, Russian SFSR, Soviet Union
- Died: 16 July 2007 (aged 67); Moscow, Russia

Mikhail Ivanovich Kononov (Russian: Михаи́л Ива́нович Ко́нонов; 25 April 1940 – 16 July 2007) was a Soviet and Russian stage and film actor. People's Artist of Russia (1999).

== Biography ==
He first appeared on stage at school. In 1963, Mikhail Kononov graduated from the Shchepkin Drama School and was admitted to the Maly Theatre. However, after five years of acting in theatre, in 1968 he quit the stage forever. He married Natalya Pavlovna Kononova in 1969.

The typical image of his hero, a simple-hearted, kind and unaffected fellow, started taking its shape in his debut film Our Common Friend (1961) and further on in the revolutionary tragic comedy Chief of Chukotka (1966), the war drama No Path Through Fire (1967), and the heroic comedy At War as at War (1969), among others.

As the actor stated himself, his best role was that of Foma in Andrei Tarkovsky's well-known historic drama Andrei Rublev. One of the most popular films starring Kononov was the series Big School-Break (1972), where he played the young teacher Nestor Petrovich. He was also popular for his roles in children's films. Many Russian viewers remember Kononov as the sly and crafty space pirate Krys in the legendary children's sci-fi miniseries Guest from the Future (1985). Kononov considered himself a tragicomic actor.

In the last years of his life Mikhail Kononov rejected most of the roles offered to him due to his dislike of modern Russian cinema.

Two weeks before his death, he went to hospital with pneumonia. However, in the hospital, his condition only worsened as he did not have enough money to afford medicine. Mikhail Kononov died from tromboembolism on 16 July 2007 in Moscow. His body was cremated and buried in the Vagankovo Cemetery.

== Awards ==
- Honored Artist of the RSFSR (1989)
- People's Artist of Russia (1999)

== Selected filmography ==
- Come Tomorrow, Please... (Russian: Приходите завтра...), 1963 as passenger of bus
- Goodbye, Boys (Russian: До свидания, мальчики!), 1964 as Vitya Anikin
- Andrei Rublev (Russian: Андрей Рублёв), 1966 as Foma
- Chief of Chukotka (Russian: Начальник Чукотки), 1966 as Bychkov
- No Path Through Fire (Russian: В огне брода нет), 1968 as Semyonov
- At War as at War (Russian: Hа войне как на войне), 1969 as Alexander Maleshkin
- The Beginning (Russian: Начало), 1970 as Pavlik
- Big School-Break (Russian: Большая перемена), 1972 as Nestor Petrovich Severov
- Finist, the brave Falcon (Russian: Финист – Ясный Сокол), 1975 as Yashka
- Captain Nemo (Russian: Капитан Немо), 1975 as Conseil
- Twenty Days Without War (Russian: Двадцать дней без войны), 1976 as Pasha Rubtsov
- Story of an Unknown Actor (Russian: Повесть о неизвестном актёре), 1977 as Petya Strizhov
- Siberiade (Russian: Сибириада), 1979 as Rodion Klimentov
- Vasili and Vasilisa (Russian: Василий и Василиса), 1981 as Vasili
- Station for Two (Russian: Вокзал для двоих), 1982 as Nikolasha, a policeman
- Crazy Day of Engineer Barkasov (Russian: Безумный день инженера Баркасова), 1983
- Alone and Unarmed (Russian: Один и без оружия), 1984 as Pyotr, porter
- Guest from the Future (Russian: Гостья из будущего), 1985 as Krys, space pirate / spaceport employee Mikhail Ivanovich
- She with a Broom, He in a Black Hat (Russian: Она с метлой, он в чёрной шляпе), 1987 as wizard
- The Inner Circle (Russian: Ближний круг), 1991 as Kliment Voroshilov
- Assia and the Hen with the Golden Eggs (Russian: Курочка Ряба), 1994 as Father Nicodemus
- The First Circle (Russian: В круге первом), 2006 as Spiridon
