= Olga Vasilyeva (actress) =

Russian film and stage actress

- Born: Olga Alekseyevna Vasilyeva; July 3, 1972 (age 54); Moscow, Soviet Union
- Occupation: Actress
- Years active: since 1992

Olga Alekseyevna Vasilyeva (Russian: Ольга Алексеевна Васильева; born July 3, 1972) is a Russian film and stage actress.

One of her most famous acting roles is that of Grand Duchess Maria in Gleb Panfilov's The Romanovs: An Imperial Family (2000).

Since 1998, he has been a teacher at the Department of Stage Speech at GITIS.

== Filmography ==
- Friendzone 2 (2024)
- Friendzone (2021)
- Dostoevsky (2010)
- Edelweißpiraten (2004)
- The Key of Bedroom (2003)
- The Romanovs: An Imperial Family (2000)
- Barkhanov and His Bodyguard (1996)
- Gold Mint (1995)
- Limita (1994)
- Last Saturday (1993)
- You Are My Only Love (1993)
- Men's Zigzag (1992)
