= Dmitry Pevtsov =

Russian actor and politician (b. 1963)

Dmitry Pevtsov MP
- Дмитрий Певцов
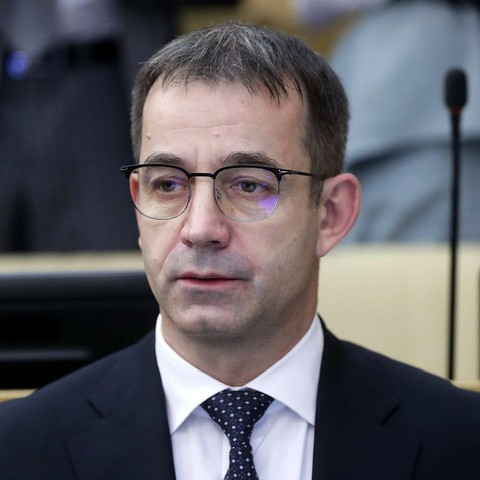

Member of the State Duma for Moscow
- Incumbent
- Assumed office 12 October 2021
- Preceded by: Denis Parfenov
- Constituency: Medvedkovo (No. 200)

Personal details
- Born: Dmitry Anatolyevich Pevtsov; 8 July 1963 (age 63) Moscow, RSFSR, Soviet Union
- Party: New People (from 2021)
- Spouse: Olga Drozdova
- Children: 1
- Education: Russian Institute of Theatre Arts (1984)
- Occupation: Actor
- Religion: Russian Orthodox

Dmitry Anatolyevich Pevtsov (Russian: Дмитрий Анатольевич Певцов) (born 8 July 1963) is a Russian actor and politician representing the Medvedkovo constituency of Moscow in the State Duma. While elected as an independent in 2021, Pevtsov became a member of the New People political party political party later the same year.

== Biography ==
Pevtsov was born in Moscow. He has Russian Jewish ancestry and his grandfather was executed by the NKVD in 1938.

== Political views ==
On 17–19 September 2021, under the motto "not only a national actor, but also a national candidate", he was elected as an independent deputy to the State Duma, Russia's federal legislative assembly. Upon taking his seat on 12 October, he became a member of the New People Duma faction.

In October 2021, Pevtsov was confirmed as first deputy chairman of the State Duma Committee on Cultural Affairs.

Pevtsov identified the support of the institution of the family, the opening of a new version of the law on culture, the distribution of a network of youth cultural schools and development centers, and lowering the retirement age as his priorities in the post of deputy.

Previously, the actor had repeatedly advocated a ban on abortion, foreign social networks and populating people's private lives in them, had demanded censorship in the arts and criminal liability of rap singers for the diabolical tone of their songs.

I am absolutely proud supporter of Putin. I watch what is happening in the country for a long time already - I am 53 years old. In 1991 I already understood everything well. And I see how the country has changed since 2000, when Putin came. I do not compare the two persons, but ... Nicholas II wrote into the column "profession" in some inquiry: "The Master of the Russian land". Today, the so-called liberal intelligentsia reminds me of the people that ultimately led to the murder of the king in 1918. They are engaged in everything but themselves. And one must begin with the question: what am I? what have I done for my country to become better? What am I, a sinless angel, to pound the government so righteously?
I'm deeply convinced that for the first time in 70 years we've got a professional manager, who really works for the state. And, mind you, weekly confesses and takes Communion. I know that for sure! And it tells me a lot. True Orthodox person can not do evil. Even if he is engaged in such a slippery thing [as politics]. Leading Russia is daunting. But everywhere, at all performances, including in front of students, I say: we live in a country that has risen from its knees. We are stronger, and we are feared and hated by some - take a scandal with our Olympians. They want to ruffle, to provoke us. We annoy them. We grow stronger. In contrast, Europe is falling apart. And America - a colossus on feet of clay. This is what I feel about policy today. Although a few years ago, I was on the side of that part of intelligentsia, which since Soviet times fights with the authorities. It is a bad habit!

On 18 March 2022, Pevtsov spoke at Vladimir Putin's Moscow rally celebrating the annexation of Crimea by the Russian Federation from Ukraine and justifying the 2022 Russian invasion of Ukraine. In April and May 2022, Pevtsov participated in a series of concerts organized in order to support the invasion.

=== Sanctions ===
He was sanctioned by the UK government in 2022 in relation to the Russo-Ukrainian War.

== Selected filmography ==
=== Films ===
- 1986 – End of the World, followed by a symposium
- 1990 – Mother
- 1990 – The Witches Cave
- 1990 – His Nickname Is Beast
- 1998 – Contract with Death
- 1999 – A Subtle Thing
- 2005 – Dead Man's Bluff
- 2005 – The Turkish Gambit
- 2005 – Popsa
- 2006 – Carnival Night 2, or Fifty years later
- 2007 – Artistka
- 2007 – Election Day
- 2007 – Snow Angel
- 2008 – Guilty Without Guilt
- 2011 – Boris Godunov

=== Television series ===
- 1996 – Queen Margot
- 1997 – The Countess de Monsoreau
- 2000 – Bandit Petersburg (The Attorney)
- 2005 – The Fall of the Empire
- 2006 – The First Circle
- 2009 – Sniper. Weapon of Retaliation
- 2013 – Einstein. Theory of Love
- 2014 – Ship

=== Game shows ===
- 2002 – Last Hero 2 (host)

== Awards and nominations ==
- 3rd European Film Awards (1990) – European Supporting Actor (Mother)
