= Hamlet. XXI Century =

2009 miniseries by Yuri Kara

- Written by: Yuri Kara
- Directed by: Yuri Kara
- Starring: Gela Meskhi; Dmitri Dyuzhev; Evgeniya Kryukova; Yulia Kara; Danila Kozlovsky
- Country of origin: Russia
- Original language: Russian

Production
- Producer: Yuri Kara
- Cinematography: Vadim Semyonovykh
- Running time: 45 minutes
- Production company: Master

Original release
- Release: 2009

Hamlet. XXI Century (Russian: Гамлет. XXI век, romanized: Gamlet. XXI vek) is a 2009 four-episode television miniseries by Yuri Kara. It is an adaptation and modernization of William Shakespeare's tragedy Hamlet.

== Plot ==
The plot of Shakespeare's drama is transferred to the screen with practically no changes, except for transferring the action to the 21st century. The wedding of Claudius and Gertrude takes place in a nightclub, Hamlet with Laertes compete in street racing on expensive cars, Rosencrantz and Guildenstern are outsiders and misfits.

The plot line is preserved - Claudius kills Hamlet's father, marries Gertrude, the father's ghost comes at night and in conversation with Hamlet reveals the details of his death. Hamlet is determined to avenge his father. During the performance of traveling artists an episode with a murder is added to the play "The Mousetrap", which infuriates Claudius.

Hamlet kills the eavesdropping and scheming Polonius, after which he tries to send him away from the country, and to blow him up on the way while on the yacht, however, his entourage, Rosencrantz with Guildenstern, die instead. Hamlet also returns to Elsinore, where he attends the funeral of Ophelia. Laertes, conspired by Claudius, is ready to avenge his father and sister. The duel of young people consists of street racing. Left after the competition on the faulty car, Hamlet stands the battle with Laertes, and, mourning his mother, Gertrude, who drank poisoned wine, gets a treacherous blow in the back from King Claudius. Gathering the last strength Hamlet stabs the sword in the back of the jubilant king.

== Cast ==
- Gela Meskhi — Prince Hamlet
- Dmitri Dyuzhev — Claudius
- Evgeniya Kryukova — Gertrude
- Yulia Kara — Ophelia
- Danila Kozlovsky — Laertes
- Andrei Fomin — Polonius
- Viktor Sukhorukov — Ozrik
- Igor Lagutin — Ghost
- Armen Dzhigarkhanyan — gravedigger
- Alexander Berdnikov — Rosenkrantz
- Ilya Obolonkov — Guildenstern
- Dmitry Beroyev — Horatio
- Dmitry Bozin — Actor
- Elena Morozova — Actress
