= His Nickname Is Beast =

- Russian poster
- Russian: …По прозвищу «Зверь»
- Directed by: Aleksandr Muratov
- Written by: Viktor Dotsenko
- Starring: Dmitry Pevtsov; Tatyana Skorokhodova; Boris Shcherbakov; Yuriy Nazarov; Lev Prygunov
- Cinematography: Elizbar Karavayev
- Music by: Boris Rychkov
- Production company: Mosfilm
- Release date: 1990
- Running time: 88 minutes
- Country: Soviet Union
- Language: Russian

His Nickname Is Beast (Russian: …По прозвищу «Зверь») is a 1990 Soviet action film directed by Aleksandr Muratov.

== Plot ==
Military Special Forces trooper Savely Govorkov, nicknamed "The Beast" (Dmitry Pevtsov), returns to Russia from Afghanistan war. The country is now in the middle of Perestroika and is mainly ruled by crime mobs. One of those, Alik (Boris Shcherbakov), is requested by his seemingly girlfriend Larissa to employ Govorkov as her bodyguard due to his honest personality and similarity to her brother, who died in Afghanistan. Unwilling to live a corrupted lifestyle, Savely initially refuses but later agrees after witnessing how roughly and unfairly Larissa is treated. Extremely hotheaded and jealous, Alik orders Savely to provide Larissa a 24/7 surveillance with only one exception - a mysterious professor she visits every Tuesday for Korean lessons and returns crying every time.

Things initially go well for Savely until Larissa tricks him one day in a cinema and escapes, leaving him a message through Ricardo's (Alik's companion) employee saying that she will marry Ricardo and escape with him to Italy. In addition, Govorkov also learns that his best military friend, Victor Varlamov (also employed by Alik), is wanted for murder after accidentally killing a man while protecting Alik from being killed himself. Though Alik made a deal with the police to keep Varlamov out of jail, he kept his file within his safe, holding Varlamov as hostage refusing to let him go free. After saving Alik's cashier, Vladimir Andreyevich (Vladimir Samoilov), from a robbery attempt, Govorkov is assigned to deliver cash into Alik's Saint Petersburg branch. Seeing this as an opportunity, Govorkov hides the cash and blackmails Alik to release Varlamov in exchange for the money. Though trying to keep a low profile, Govorkov visits Larissa and is eventually ambushed by Alik. He kidnaps Larissa, forcing Govorkov to reveal the hideout of the money - only to discover it has been accidentally burned by one of Alik's henchmen. Enraged, Alik forces Govorkov to plead himself guilty for money laundering and sends Larissa into a mad-house.

Upon arriving to one of Tayga's jails, grown up in a very bad neighborhood and toughly trained by his military martial art inspector Captain Shlikov, Govorkov refuses to obey local rules or being intimidated neither by correction officers nor by his cell-mates, which frustrates both sides. After overpowering an assassination attempt from a local thug "Arshin" (whom Govorkov embarrassed earlier) - he is taken under the wing of a local crime lord "King" (Armen Dzhigarkhanyan) - intimidating and well respected by both sides of the law. Things, however, take a bad turn again once it is discovered that Varlamov has been murdered by an unknown crime lord who also sent 2 assassins - Ugriumov and Danilin - to eliminate Govorkov. In order to do it quicker and swifter - "King" is urgently released from the prison. Warned by one of his cell-mates, Govorkov narrowly escapes assassination and, together with the 2 assassins, escapes from the jail through supplies train. During jail border control - Ugriumov is fatally injured while Govorkov and Danilin remain unharmed. As the train reaches the nearby bridge - Govorkov and Ugriumov escape by jumping to the below river, but Danilin dies jumping too late - hitting shallow water instead. Ugriumov soon dies from his wounds, not before revealing Govorkov (out of conscious and respect for Govorkov for carrying him instead of leaving him to die despite everything he did) that the one who ordered to kill Varlamov and Govorkov is a big crime lord nicknamed - "The Korean" - the mysterious professor Larissa was once visiting.

Upon returning to Moscow, Govorokov encounters Alik who reveals that "The Korean" is his boss with whom he shared Larissa for harassing purposes and the person himself is found out to be Vladimir Andreyevich - the "cashier", saved by Govorkov during one of his assignments. Govorkov encounters "The Korean" on his daughter's wedding and, after an unsuccessful bribe attempt, "Korean" agrees to take him to Larissa. On the parking lot, Govorkov is ambushed by "Korean" security guards, led by Shlikov. Govorkov manages to escape eliminating the guards, including Shlikov, throwing him down the bridge after an intense combat. Left alone and surrounded by police forces, "Korean" tries to escape but is electrocuted to death by the chasing officers.

Eventually, Govorkov arrives to the mad-house where Larissa is kept and meets her. Though in a very poor mental condition - seeing Govorkov's friendly face and hearing his soft voice moves Larissa - giving her a hope for a better times after all.

== Cast ==
- Dmitry Pevtsov as Savely Govorkov
- Tatyana Skorokhodova as Larissa (Rybka) (as T. Skorokhodova)
- Boris Shcherbakov as Alik
- Yuriy Nazarov as Prison Chief Captain
- Lev Prygunov as Ugryumov
- Igor Yasulovich as Danilin
- Vladimir Anikin as Viktor Sergeyevich Varlamov
- Aleksandr Arzhilovsky as "Arshin"
- Armen Dzhigarkhanyan as "King"
- Viktor Filippov
- Andrei Grinevich
- Vladimir Samoilov as "Korean" AKA Vladimir Andreevich
