= Inna Churikova =

Soviet and Russian actress (1943–2023)

- Инна Чурикова
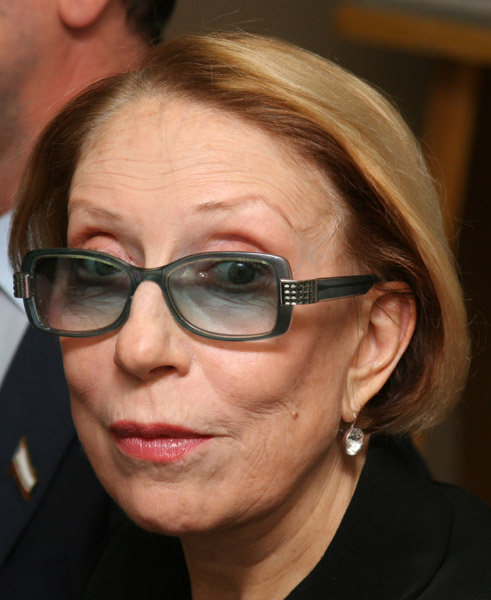
- Churikova in 2011
- Born: 5 October 1943; Belebey, Bashkir ASSR, Russian SFSR, Soviet Union
- Died: 14 January 2023 (aged 79); Moscow, Russia
- Resting place: Novodevichy Cemetery, Moscow
- Education: Mikhail Shchepkin Higher Theatre School
- Occupation: Actress
- Years active: 1959–2023
- Employer: Lenkom Theatre
- Spouse: Gleb Panfilov
- Awards: Golden Mask, Order "For Merit to the Fatherland", Ordre des Arts et des Lettres, People's Artist of the USSR, People's Artist of the RSFSR, State Prize of the Russian Federation, Vasilyev Brothers State Prize of the RSFSR, Lenin Komsomol Prize

Inna Mikhailovna Churikova (Note: Russian: Инна Михайловна Чурикова, romanized: Inna Mikhaylovna Churikova) (5 October 1943 – 14 January 2023) was a Soviet and Russian stage and film actress.

== Biography ==
Churikova was born in Belebey, Bashkir ASSR, Russian SFSR, Soviet Union. In the early 1950s, Inna moved with her mother to Moscow. Inna was bent on becoming an actress from an early age: as a schoolgirl she studied at the drama studio attached to the Stanislavsky Theatre and later, after a few failures, entered Shchepkin Drama School. She debuted in filming whilst a first-year student, in minor episodic roles. Inna Churikova became famous thanks to the films V ogne broda net (No Path Through Fire) (1968), and especially the triumphal Nachalo (The Debut) (1970) by the then beginning film director and her future husband Gleb Panfilov.

Her other most remarkable works were in the films: Tot samyy Myunkhgauzen (The Very Same Munchhausen) (1979) written by Grigory Gorin and directed by Mark Zakharov, Voenno-polevoy roman (Wartime Romance) (1983) by Pyotr Todorovsky, Rebro Adama (Adam's Rib) (1990) by Vyacheslav Krishtofovich, God sobaki (The Year of a Dog) (1993) by Semyon Aranovich, Plashch Kazanovy (Casanova's Raincoat) (1993) by Aleksandr Galin, Kurochka Ryaba (Ryaba My Chicken) (1994) by Andrei Konchalovsky, and Shirli-myrli (What a mess!) (1995) by Vladimir Menshov. For her role in Wartime Romance, she won the Silver Bear for Best Actress at the 34th Berlin International Film Festival, and won the Nika Award in 1991 in the Best Actress category for her role in Rebro Adama.

Churikova was also a renowned stage actress, mainly working in Lenkom Theatre with director Mark Zakharov, as well as a non-repertory theatre star.

Together with her husband and son, Churikova was a co-screenwriter for the historical feature The Romanovs: An Imperial Family (2000), in which rather than appear on screen, she dubs the English actress Lynda Bellingham starring as the tsarina Alexandra Feodorovna.

On January 4, 2023, the actress was hospitalized at the Botkin Hospital in Moscow due to poor health. She died there on January 14, 2023, at the age of 79 after a long illness (multiple brain cysts). The farewell ceremony for the actress took place on January 17, 2023, at the Christ the Savior Cathedral in Moscow. She was buried at the Novodevichy Cemetery in Moscow. Gleb Panfilov outlived his wife by seven months and died on August 26 of the same year.

=== Political views ===
In 2001, she signed an open letter in defense of the NTV television channel. In 2003, she was among the cultural and scientific figures who called on the Russian authorities to stop the war in Chechnya and move to a negotiation process. In 2006, she joined an appeal condemning the forced deportation of Georgian citizens from Russia, the associated cases of ethnic discrimination and the general deterioration of relations between the countries. In 2010, she signed the appeal "Lebedev and Khodorkovsky must be released!" She advocated for the release of Grigory Pasko. Vasily Aleksanyan, Svetlana Bakhmina. She spoke out against the adoption of a law prohibiting the adoption of orphans by US citizens. She has repeatedly supported animal protection initiatives.

== Filmography ==
- Clouds Over Borsk (Тучи над Борском) (1960) as Raika, Olya's classmate
- Walking the Streets of Moscow (Я шагаю по Москве) (1963) as girl participating in the playful contest
- Jack Frost (Морозко) (1964) as Marfushka
- Where are you now, Maxim? (Где ты теперь, Максим?) (1964) as Angelica
- The Cook (Стряпуха) (1965) as Barbara
- Thirty Three (Тридцать три) (1965) as Rose Lyubashkina
- Older Sister (Старшая сестра) (1966) as Nelly
- The Elusive Avengers (Неуловимые мстители) (1966) as blond Jozie
- No Path Through Fire (В огне брода нет) (1967) as Tanya Tetkina
- The Beginning (Начало) (1970) as Pasha Stroganova/Joan of Arc
- I Want the Floor (Прошу слова) (1975) as Yelizaveta Andreyevna Uvarovа, chairman of the City Council
- The Very Same Munchhausen (Тот самый Мюнхгаузен) (1979) as Jakobina von Munchhausen
- The Theme (Тема) (1979) as Sasha Nikolaeva, museum guide
- Valentina (Валентина) (1981) as Anna V. Khoroshih, barmaid
- Wartime Romance (Военно-полевой роман) (1983) as Vera
- Vassa (Васса) (1983) as Vassa Zheleznova
- Dead Souls (Мертвые души) (1984) as Lady, nice in every respect
- Courier (Курьер) (1987) as Lydia Alekseevna, Ivan's mother
- Mother (Мать) (1990) as Pelagea Nilovna Vlassova, Pavel's mother
- Adam's Rib (Ребро Адама) (1990) as Nina Elizarovna
- Casanova's Raincoat (Плащ Казановы) (1993) as Chloe
- The Year of the Dog (Год Собаки) (1994) as Vera Morozova
- Assia and the Hen with the Golden Eggs (Курочка Ряба) (1994) as Asya Klyachina
- Shirli-myrli (Ширли-мырли) (1995) as Praskoviya Alekseyevna Krolikova
- Bless the Woman (Благословите женщину) (2003) as Kunina
- The Idiot (Идиот) (2003) as Yelizaveta Prokofyevna Yepanchina, general Yepanchin's wife
- Casus belli (Казус белли) (2003) as Masha
- Narrow Bridge (Узкий мост) (2004) as Roza Borisovna
- Moscow Saga (Московская сага) (2004) as Mary Gradova
- Spiral Staircase (Винтовая лестница) (2005) as Olga Mikhalovna
- The First Circle (В круге первом) (2006) as Gerasimovich's Wife
- Carnival Night 2, or 50 Years Later (Карнавальная ночь 2, или 50 лет спустя) (2007) as Inessa
- Guilty Without Fault (Без вины виноватые) (2008) as Yelena Ivanovna Kruchinina, a famous actress
- Secrets of Palace Overturns. Part 7. "Vivat, Anna!" (Тайны дворцовых переворотов. Фильм 7. "Виват, Анна!") (2008) as Anna Ioanovna
- Burnt by the Sun 2: Сitadel (Утомленные солнцем 2: Цитадель) (2011) as old woman
- Without Borders (Без границ) (2015) as Nina Polyanskaya, widow
- The Very Best Day (Самый лучший день) (2015) as Lyubov Vasyutina
- The Land of Oz (Страна ОЗ) (2015) as mother
- Ivan Denisovich (Иван Денисович) (2021) as old woman
- Patient No. 1 (Пациент No. 1) (2023) as Anna Chernenko

== Honours and awards ==
- Order "For Merit to the Fatherland":
  - 1st class (2018)
  - 2nd class (2013)
  - 3rd class (27 July 2007) - for outstanding contribution to the development of theatrical art, and many years of creative activity
  - 4th class (25 August 1997) - a great contribution to the development of theatrical arts
- State Prize of the Russian Federation (1996) - for the role of Arkadina in the play "The Seagull" by Chekhov
- Vasilyev Brothers State Prize of the RSFSR (1985) - for the main role in film "Vassa"
- Lenin Komsomol Prize (1976) - for the creation of images in contemporary cinema
- People's Artist of the USSR (1991)
- People's Artist of the RSFSR (1985)
- Honored Artist of the RSFSR (1977)
- Officer of the Order of Arts and Letters (France, 2010)
- Stanislavsky Award (2014)
