= Chief of Chukotka =

- Russian: Начальник Чукотки
- Directed by: Vitaly Melnikov
- Written by: Vladimir Valutskiy; Viktor Viktorov
- Produced by: M. Trukhina
- Starring: Mikhail Kononov; Alexey Gribov; Gennadiy Danzanov; Nikolay Volkov Sr.; Stepan Krylov
- Cinematography: Eduard Rozovsky
- Edited by: Zinaida Sheineman
- Music by: Nadezhda Simonyan
- Production company: Lenfilm
- Release date: 1966
- Running time: 86 min.
- Country: Soviet Union
- Language: Russian

Chief of Chukotka (Russian: Начальник Чукотки, romanized: Nachalnik Chukotki) is a 1966 Soviet adventure comedy-drama film directed by Vitaly Melnikov.

== Plot ==
In 1922, Commissar Alexey Glazkov and young clerk Alyosha Bychkov travel to the village of Uigunan in Chukotka. Glazkov had received a mandate from the Soviet government to manage the affairs of Chukotka. En route, Glazkov dies of typhus, and upon arriving at Uigunan, Alyosha is met by the former tsarist customs officer Khramov. Alyosha attempts to find a musher to take him on a return trip, but is unsuccessful, so he issues an order to the village that, until further notice, he is to take command of the village.

As his first executive act, Alyosha distributes expropriates food supplies from the warehouse of the American merchant Stenson and distributes them to the starving Chukchi people. Khramov tries to prevent this, and Alyosha arrests him. In Khramov's place, Alyosha appoints Vukvutagin "Vovka", a Chukchi previously exiled by Khramov for attempting to break into Stenson's warehouse, as his second-in-command.

In the spring, commercial vessels from various countries arrive in Chukotka to exchange various goods for furs. The owners of these vessels, taking advantage of the Chukchi's ignorance, buy furs at low prices to be resold at market value in foreign markets, having already arranged to pay Khramov bribes. Alyosha frees Khramov and hires him as a consultant to learn the basics of the economics of trade. He sets a duty at 40% of the market value and demands that the foreigners trade fairly with the Chukchi. Eventually, Alyosha collects a million dollars and decides to use the money to develop Chukotka, planning to electrify the region and building bathhouses and a planetarium.

Meanwhile, the foreign entrepreneurs persuade the counter-revolutionary government of "Free Chukotka" to get rid of Alyosha. Cossacks, led by Colonel Petukhov, attack Uigunan. The Chukchi refuse to fight back, and Alyosha is forced to flee with the million dollars in a boat with Khramov. Lost in the dark, they cross the Bering Strait into Alaska. On Alaskan coast, Khramov attempts to seize the money for himself, but the pair is noticed by American border guards, who arrest them. Alyosha and Khramov request political asylum and soon reach San Francisco, where Alyosha manages to escape from Khramov with the money.

Alyosha travels around the world in the holds of various ships, passing through San Francisco, Rangoon, Cape Town, and Hamburg to Petrograd, where local street children steal all his money. However, the Cheka apprehends the children and the money is returned to Alyosha after he verifies his identity. Alyosha returns to Chukotka, and the Soviet government sends the money to alleviate famine in the Volga region.

== Cast ==
- Mikhail Kononov as Bychkov
- Alexey Gribov as Timofey Ivanovich Khramov
- Gennadiy Danzanov as Vukvutagin
- Nikolay Volkov Sr. as Mr. Stenson
- Pavel Vinnik as foreigner in a hat
- Stepan Krylov as Chekmaryov
- Tito Romalio as waiter on the ship
- Iosif Konopatsky as Glazkov
- Aleksey Kozhevnikov as commissioner
- Konstantin Adashevsky as merchant Bryukhanov
- Pavel Pankov as Colonel Petukhov
- Anatoly Korolkevich as war minister
- Anatoli Abramov as order bearer
- Aleksandr Zakharov as foreign agent
- Aleksei Petrenko as robber (uncredited)
