= Ivan Denisovich (film) =

- Directed by: Gleb Panfilov
- Written by: Gleb Panfilov; Aleksandr Solzhenitsyn
- Produced by: Maksim Panfilov; Anton Zlatopolsky; Irina Savina
- Starring: Filipp Yankovsky; Artur Beschastny; Aleksandr Karavayev; Stepan Abramov; Igor Savochkin; Sergey Karyakin; Denis Karasyov; Mikhail Khmurov
- Narrated by: Leonid Yarmolnik
- Cinematography: Mikhail Khasaya; Mikhail Agranovich
- Production companies: Russia-1; Vera
- Distributed by: Central Partnership
- Release date: September 23, 2021
- Running time: 105 minutes
- Country: Russia
- Language: Russian

Ivan Denisovich, also in English speaking regions titled as 100 Minutes (Russian: Иван Денисович) is a 2021 Russian historical war drama film directed by Gleb Panfilov, a film adaptation based on the story by Aleksandr Solzhenitsyn's One Day in the Life of Ivan Denisovich. The film premiered at the 2021 Locarno International Film Festival. It was theatrically released on September 23, 2021 by Central Partnership. This was Panfilov’s final film before his death 2023.

== Plot ==
Soldier Ivan Denisovich Shukhov was taken prisoner by the Germans, and after leaving it, he ended up in his homeland as a prisoner and he began to build a giant space industry plant. In conditions of hunger, humiliation and fear, he managed to maintain honesty and openness to the world, but will he be able to go free and meet with his daughters?

== Cast ==
- Filipp Yankovsky as Ivan Denisovich Shukhov
- Artur Beschastny as Kildigs
- Aleksandr Karavayev as Vasily Nikitin
- Stepan Abramov as Stepan Matafonov
- Igor Savochkin as the overseer Tatarin
- Sergey Karyakin as Brigadier Tyurin
- Denis Karasyov as Polkovnik Borshchov
- Mikhail Khmurov as Cavtorang Buynovsky
- Vladimir Yeryomin as Caesar Markovich
- Inna Churikova as eldress

== Reception ==
The film went on the shortlist for the Golden Eagle Award, along with such works as Persian Lessons and Silver Skates in the Best Film category.

Anton Dolin of Meduza praised the film, saying "Panfilov's film is a whole iconostasis of images, which one would like to carefully examine and which is not easily forgotten."
