= Za co? =

Za co? / Why?
- Directed by: Jerzy Kawalerowicz
- Written by: Pawel Fin; Valeri Pendrakovsky; Alexander Bondarev
- Based on: "What For?" by Leo Tolstoy
- Produced by: Aleksandr Mikhaylov
- Starring: Magdalena Wójcik; Artur Zmijewski; Emilia Krakowska
- Cinematography: Mikhail Agranovich
- Edited by: Valentina Ignatova
- Music by: Valeri Myagkikh
- Production company: KADR
- Release date: 1995
- Countries: Poland; Russia
- Languages: Polish; Russian

Za co? is a 1995 Polish historical film. It is based on the short story "What For?" by Leo Tolstoy published in 1906.

Za co? / Why?, production Poland-Russia; based on a story by Leo Tolstoy; screenplay with Pawel Fin, Valeri Pendrakovsky and Alexander Bondarev, directed by Jerzy Kawalerowicz. The dramatic story of a Polish nobleman who is arrested and sentenced to penal servitude for taking part in the November Uprising of 1830.

== Literature ==
- Bieious U. Tolstoj wedlug Kawalerowicza // Wiadomosci Kulturalne. 1995. Nr 48. S. 5
- Alexander Shpagin, Miroslava Segida, Sergey Zemlyanukhin: Films of Russia. Feature films. TV. Video 1992-2003. Moscow: Double-D, 2004. ISBN 5-900902-05-08.
