= Kseniya Kachalina =

Russian actress (1971–2025)

- Ксения Качалина
- Born: 3 May 1971; Saratov, Russian SFSR, USSR
- Died: 2 December 2025 (aged 54); Moscow, Russia
- Occupation: Actress
- Years active: 1991–2025

Kseniya Mikhailovna Kachalina (Russian: Ксения Михайловна Качалина; 3 May 1971 – 2 December 2025) was a Russian actress.

== Life and career ==
Kseniya Mikhailovna Kachalina was born 3 May 1971 and died on 2 December 2025. She studied two years at the acting department at the Saratov Conservatory named L. Sobinov (1987–1988), and then, in 1995, graduated from the All-Russian State University of Cinematography named after S. A. Gerasimov (and also called VGIK) class of Sergey Solovyov and Valery Rubinchik.

Her acting career began in the 1990s and includes roles such as Grand Duchess Tatiana in Gleb Panfilov's The Romanovs: A Crowned Family (2000).

Kachalina died in Moscow on 2 December 2025, at the age of 54.

== Filmography ==
- No Love (1991)
- Tma (1992)
- Arbitr (1992)
- Over the Dark Water (1993)
- The First Circle (1993)
- Three Sisters (1994)
- Letters in a Previous Life (1994)
- Men's Revelations (1995)
- Whoever Softer (1996)
- The Circus Burned Down, and the Clowns Have Gone (1998)
- Dukh (1999)
- The Romanovs: An Imperial Family (2000)
- Prazdnik (2001)
- Goddess: How I fell in Love (2004)
- The First Circle (2006)
