= No Path Through Fire =

1968 film

- Film poster
- Directed by: Gleb Panfilov
- Written by: Gleb Panfilov; Yevgeni Gabrilovich
- Produced by: Nikolay Neelov
- Starring: Inna Churikova; Anatoly Solonitsyn; Mikhail Gluzsky; Maya Bulgakova; Mikhail Kononov
- Cinematography: Dmitri Dolinin
- Edited by: Lyudmila Obrazumova
- Music by: Vadim Bibergan
- Production company: Lenfilm
- Release date: 1 June 1968
- Running time: 95 minutes
- Country: Soviet Union
- Language: Russian

No Path Through Fire (Russian: В огне брода нет, romanized: V ogne broda net) is a 1968 Soviet war film directed by Gleb Panfilov. The film won the Golden Leopard at the Locarno International Film Festival.

== Plot ==
The film is set during the Russian Civil War on a hospital train which is transporting the wounded from the front. A homely and awkward girl, Tanya Tyotkina, who is working as a nurse on the train, suddenly discovers the talent of an artist in herself. In this journey she finds her first timid love and transfers her clandestine feelings to paper. She is faced with a choice - to abandon her comrade, or to give her young life for the revolution.

== Cast ==
- Inna Churikova as Tanya Tyotkina
- Anatoly Solonitsyn as Commissar Yevstryukov
- Mikhail Gluzsky as Fokich
- Maya Bulgakova as Maria
- Anatoli Marenich as Morozik
- Vladimir Kashpur as Kolka
- Yevgeni Lebedev as Colonel
- Mikhail Kononov as Alyosha
- Vadim Beroev as Vasya
- Mikhail Kokshenov as Zotik
- Lyubov Malinovskaya as Mother

== Production ==
The film was shot at the station Bezlesnaya near Murom (Vladimir Oblast).
