= Over the Dark Water =

- Russian: Над тёмной водой
- Directed by: Dmitry Meskhiev
- Written by: Valery Todorovsky
- Produced by: Alexander Buchman; Natan Fyodorovsky; Igor Kalyonov; Vasili Karlovsky
- Starring: Aleksandr Abdulov; Kseniya Kachalina; Yury Kuznetsov; Tatyana Lyutaeva; Vladimir Ilyin
- Cinematography: Pavel Lebeshev
- Edited by: Tamara Lipartiya
- Music by: Sergey Kuryokhin
- Production company: Lenfilm
- Release date: 1992
- Running time: 94 min.
- Country: Russia
- Language: Russian

Over the Dark Water (Russian: Над тёмной водой, romanized: Nad temnoy vodoy) is a 1992 Russian drama film directed by Dmitry Meskhiev.

== Plot ==
The film takes place in Leningrad in the 60s. The film tells about a beautiful girl from the province who meets three friends, each of whom invited her to marry him.

== Cast ==
- Aleksandr Abdulov as Lev
- Kseniya Kachalina as Lena
- Yury Kuznetsov as poet Sergei
- Tatyana Lyutaeva as Clara
- Vladimir Ilyin as Vladimir Viktorov
- Ivan Okhlobystin as son of Lev
- Viktor Pavlov as neighbour
- Natan Fyodorovsky as jew
- Viktor Gogolev as Scull
- Aleksandr Bashirov as investigator
- Sergey Kuryokhin as Clara's husband
