= Come Look at Me =

2001 film by Oleg Yankovsky

Come Look at Me...
- Directed by: Oleg Yankovsky; Mikhail Agranovich
- Written by: Nadezhda Ptushkina (play and screenplay)
- Produced by: Igor Tolstunov; Vladimir Grammatikov; Michael Zilberman; Vladimir Repnikov
- Starring: Oleg Yankovsky; Irina Kupchenko; Yekaterina Vasilyeva
- Cinematography: Mikhail Agranovich
- Music by: Vadim Bibergan
- Production companies: NTV-Profit; Gorky Film Studio
- Release date: 2000
- Running time: 102 minutes
- Country: Russia
- Language: Russian

Come Look at Me... (Russian: "Приходи на меня посмотреть...", romanized: Prikhodi na menya posmotret) is a 2000 Russian romantic comedy directed by Oleg Yankovsky and Mikhail Agranovich. The film was Yankovsky's sole directorial effort. Oleg Yankovsky won the award for Best Actor at Kinotavr.

== Synopsis ==
Tatiana is a middle-aged woman who lives with her disabled mother Sofia Ivanovna. Sofia has been unable to walk for the past ten years. Throughout this time Tatiana has stayed by her side. Sofia is worried that her daughter will become an old maid.

A week before the New Year, Sofia declares that she will soon die and would like to leave this world with the assurance that her daughter will be happy. The light goes out in the apartment and there is a knock at the door. An unfamiliar visitor named Igor appears with a bouquet of roses and champagne. He has arrived at the house completely by accident. In order to fulfill her dying mother's wishes, Tatiana decides to present this stranger (Igor) to Sofia as her fiancé. Igor decides to play along. He says that Tatiana is his genuine lover and phones his actual lover to announce that he is late at work, forgetting that his lover has caller ID. When the young girl calls back, Tatiana creates a scandal and Igor leaves.

Trying to break out of her deception, Tatiana persuades a saleswoman from the vegetable aisle to play the role of a long lost daughter, whom Tatiana allegedly disowned at the maternity hospital. This scene occurs in front of Igor, who decided to continue his casual acquaintance.

On New Year's Eve, Sofia insists that Tatiana spend the holiday with Igor and she leaves for the city. In the street, there is an unexpected meeting with the "daughter" who is dressed up as Santa Claus on crutches. Together they come home, where they find Sofia Ivanovna, who has risen to her feet. In tune with the striking chimes and clad in the suit of yet another Santa Claus, Igor appears on the landing and proposes to Tatiana.

== Cast ==
- Yekaterina Vasilyeva as Sofia Ivanovna
- Irina Kupchenko as Tatiana
- Oleg Yankovsky as Igor
- Natalia Shchukina as Dina, a saleswoman of the vegetable aisle
- Ivan Yankovsky as angel-boy, who throws banana skins
