= Albert Filozov =

Soviet and Russian actor (1937–2016)

- Альберт Филозов
- Born: Albert Leonidovich Filozov; 25 June 1937; Sverdlovsk, Russian SFSR, Soviet Union
- Died: 11 April 2016 (aged 78); Moscow, Russia
- Occupation: Actor
- Years active: 1959–2016
- Spouse: Natalya Stotskaya
- Children: 2

Albert Leonidovich Filozov (Russian: Альбepт Лeoнидoвич Филозoв; 25 June 1937 – 11 April 2016) was a Soviet and Russian actor. He was a People's Artist of Russia.

Filozov was born on June 25, 1937 in Sverdlovsk (now Yekaterinburg). He received the profession of turner, worked at the State Bearing Plant. He graduated from Moscow Art Theater School (1959).

In 1991 before 1995 Filozov was a master (together with Armen Dzhigarkhanyan) acting course at VGIK; he taught at GITIS.

== Partial filmography ==
- Syny otechestva (1969) as Otto von Talvig
- Yabloki sorok pervogo goda (1970)
- Vid na zhitelstvo (1972)
- Mshvidobiani dgeebi (1974) as Kovaliov
- Propal i nashelsya (1975)
- Strakh vysoty (1976) as Ilya Rozhdestvenskiy
- Smeshnye lyudi! (1977)
- Otklonenie - nol (1978) as Vinogradov
- Takeoff (Russian: Взлёт, 1979) as Panin, apothecary, Konstantin Tsiolkovsky's friend
- Dikaya okhota korolya Stakha (1980)
- Ledyanaya vnuchka (1980) as Fürst
- Could One Imagine? (Вам и не снилось…, 1981) as Konstantin Lavochkin
- Idealnyy muzh (1981) as Tommy Trafford
- Chyornaya kuritsa, ili Podzemnye zhiteli (1981)
- Teheran 43 (Тегеран 43, 1981) as Scherner, team leader of Nazi saboteurs
- Lenin in Paris (Ленин в Париже, 1981) as leader of the anarchists
- Brelok s sekretom (1981)
- Vassa (Васса, 1983) as Yuri Melnikov, a member of the District Court
- Mary Poppins, Goodbye (Мэри Поппинс. до свиданья!, 1984, TV Movie) as Mr. Banks
- Zolotaya baba (1986)
- Poslednyaya doroga (1986) as Uvarov
- Okhota na drakona (1986)
- Kapitan 'Piligrima' (1987) as Professor
- A Man from the Boulevard des Capucines (Человек с бульвара Капуцинов, 1987) as Mr. Second
- New Adventures of a Yankee in King Arthur's Court (Новые приключения янки при дворе короля Артура, 1988) as King Arthur / Merlin
- Greshnik (1988)
- The Lady with the parrot (Дама с попугаем, 1988) as Aristarch
- Operatsia 'Vunderlandi' (1989)
- Tragediya v stile rok (1990) as Dmitriy Ivanovich's Friend
- The Battle of the Three Kings (Битва трёх королей, 1990) as Hans, the royal librarian
- Doping dlya angelov (1990)
- Lost in Siberia (Затерянный в Сибири, 1991) as Lilka's father
- Syshchik Peterburgskoy politsii (1991)
- Odisseya Kapitana Blada (1991)
- Nochnye zabavy (1991) as Silin
- Firma priklyucheniy (1991)
- Melodrama s pokusheniem na ubiystvo (1992)
- Gradus chyornoy Luny (1992)
- Ariel (1992)
- Piekna nieznajoma (1993) as The British Father
- Zavtrak s vidom na Elbrus (1993)
- Ne idet... (1994)
- Koroli rossiykogo syska: Ubiystvo Buturlina (1994)
- Karera Arturo Ui (1996)
- Vsyo to, o chyom my tak dolgo mechtali (1997)
- Kto, esli ne my (1999)
- Poslushay, ne idyot li dozhd... (2000)
- In August of 1944 (В августе 44-го…, 2001)
- Sverchok za ochagom (2002) as Berta's father
- Novogodnie priklyucheniya (2002)
- Poor Nastya (Бедная Настя, 2003, TV Series) as Baron Ivan Ivanovich Korf
- Apokrif: Muzyka dlya Petra i Pavla (2005)
- The First Circle (В круге первом, 2006, TV Mini-Series) as Uncle Avenir
- Glazami volka (2006)
- Treasure Raiders (Охотники за сокровищами, 2007) as Curator
- Dyuymovochka (2007) as Maestro
- Khranit vechno (2008) as Uncle Averin
- Rusichi (2008) as White Wizard
- Kromov (2009)
- Legenda ostrova Dvid (2010)
- Moskva, ya lyublyu tebya! (2010)
- Voin.com (2012)
- Dom s bashenkoy (2012)
- Yolki 1914 (Ёлки, 2014) as Vasily Grigoryevich (final film role)
