= Valentina (1981 film) =

- Russian: Валентина
- Directed by: Gleb Panfilov
- Written by: Gleb Panfilov; Aleksandr Vampilov
- Starring: Rodion Nakhapetov; Inna Churikova; Yuri Grebenshchikov; Sergey Koltakov; Darya Mikhaylova
- Cinematography: Leonid Kalashnikov
- Edited by: Polina Skachkova
- Music by: Vadim Bibergan
- Production company: Mosfilm
- Release date: 27 October 1981
- Running time: 93 min.
- Country: Soviet Union
- Language: Russian

Valentina (Russian: Валентина) is a 1981 Soviet romantic drama film directed by Gleb Panfilov. Film adaptation of Aleksandr Vampilov’s play Last Summer in Chulimsk.

In a remote Siberian village, a young waitress’s quiet love for a local investigator ignites jealousy and betrayal, leading to a dark and tragic confrontation.

== Plot ==
Set in 1970, the story follows 18-year-old Valentina, a waitress in a small Siberian village who harbors feelings for a local investigator, Shamanov. While Shamanov is initially oblivious to her affection, her eventual confession stirs something in him. However, their budding romance faces severe challenges. Pavel, the son of a village cafeteria worker named Anna, is deeply infatuated with Valentina and becomes enraged upon discovering her feelings for Shamanov. In a moment of jealousy, he confronts Shamanov and threatens him. Shamanov, in turn, calmly hands Pavel his service pistol, daring him to act. Pavel fires but misses, ultimately feeling humiliated by the investigator's calm. Shamanov, planning to meet Valentina that evening, entrusts a note for her to Zinaida, the village pharmacist who secretly loves him. Zinaida, however, withholds the message and attempts to divert Valentina’s attention toward the accountant Mechetkine.

As events unfold, Mechetkine clumsily pursues Valentina, encouraged by her father, who sees him as a suitable match. However, Valentina rejects the idea and only reluctantly agrees to go to a dance with Pavel out of pity. Meanwhile, Shamanov returns to the teahouse to meet Valentina but learns from Zinaida, who confesses she withheld his note, that Valentina has gone with Pavel. Searching for her in vain, Shamanov eventually returns to find Valentina visibly shaken and distressed, having suffered abuse at Pavel's hands. Shamanov, unaware of what transpired, attempts to comfort her, but she breaks down. When confronted by her father about the night's events, she protects both Pavel and Shamanov by claiming she spent the evening with Mechetkine. The next morning, Valentina returns to work, bearing visible bruises, silently enduring the aftermath of the previous night.

== Cast ==
- Rodion Nakhapetov as Vladimir Mikhailovich Shamanov, a policeman-investigator
- Inna Churikova as Anna Vasilievna Khoroshikh, the dining-room host
- Yuri Grebenshchikov as Afanasi Dergachov, Anna's husband
- Sergey Koltakov as Pavel, Anna's son
- Darya Mikhaylova as Valentina, the dining-room waitress
- Vasili Korzun as Fyodor Pomigalov, Valentina's father
- Larisa Udovichenko as Zinaida 'Zina' Kashkina, a pharmacist
- Vsevolod Shilovsky as Innokenti Stepanovich Mechetkin, an accountant
- Maxim Munzuk as Ilya Eremeyev
- Anatoli Panfilov as the diesel-electric power station operator
