= The Theme =

1979 film by Gleb Panfilov

- Directed by: Gleb Panfilov
- Written by: Aleksandr Chervinsky; Gleb Panfilov
- Starring: Mikhail Ulyanov; Inna Churikova; Stanislav Lyubshin; Yevgeni Vesnik
- Distributed by: IFEX (US theatrical)
- Release dates: 1979 (USSR); 16 October 1987 (U.S. limited)
- Running time: 99 minutes
- Country: Soviet Union
- Language: Russian

The Theme (Russian: Тема, romanized: Tema) is a 1979 Soviet comedy film directed by Gleb Panfilov. It tells the story of an egotistical playwright who thinks of himself as an artist, but who allows the system to make him write conformist plays.

The film was heavily censored on its release in 1979. The full version was not released until 1986; this version was awarded the Golden Bear at the 37th Berlin International Film Festival.

== Plot ==
Popular playwright Kim Yesenin (Mikhail Ulyanov) with his mistress (Natalya Seleznyova) and friend (Yevgeni Vesnik) arrives in Suzdal on his Volga, in search of historical themes for his new play, inwardly tormented by his own bias and experiencing a spiritual crisis. In Suzdal, he runs into the family of an old teacher Maria Alexandrovna (Yevgeniya Nechayeva) with venerable, traditional notions of morality and honor. Kim tries to woo the art historian and local museum guide Sasha (Inna Churikova), a pupil of Alexandrovna, but she just plainly tells him how mediocre and immoral his plays are.

Later Kim Yesenin is a secret witness to a farewell conversation of Sasha with her lover, nicknamed as "The Hirsute" (Stanislav Lyubshin). The Hirsute is a frustrated scientist and writer, planning to emigrate to the United States (in the scene of parting with The Hirsute, Sasha shouts: "What are you going to do in this America?!").

At night, Yesenin is trying to depart for Moscow, but changes his mind midway, turns around and crashes his car on the slippery road. In the final scene, severely wounded, he gets to a phone booth and calls Sasha. Without being able to communicate anything sensible to her, Yesenin loses consciousness. Lieutenant Sinitsyn (Sergey Nikonenko) who happens to pass by, picks him up onto his motorcycle which has a sidecar attached - and on this frame the picture ends. The subsequent fate of Yesenin is unknown.

== Cast ==
- Mikhail Ulyanov as Kim Yesenin, writer
- Inna Churikova as Sasha Nikolaeva, museum guide
- Stanislav Lyubshin as Gravedigger, dissident, Sasha's friend
- Yevgeni Vesnik as Igor Paschin, writer
- Yevgeniya Nechayeva as Maria Alexandrovna
- Natalya Seleznyova as Svetlana, Yesenin's disciple
- Sergey Nikonenko as Sinitsyn, policeman
