= Yuzhnoye Medvedkovo District =

Yuzhnoye Medvedkovo District район Южное Медведково (Russian)
- District
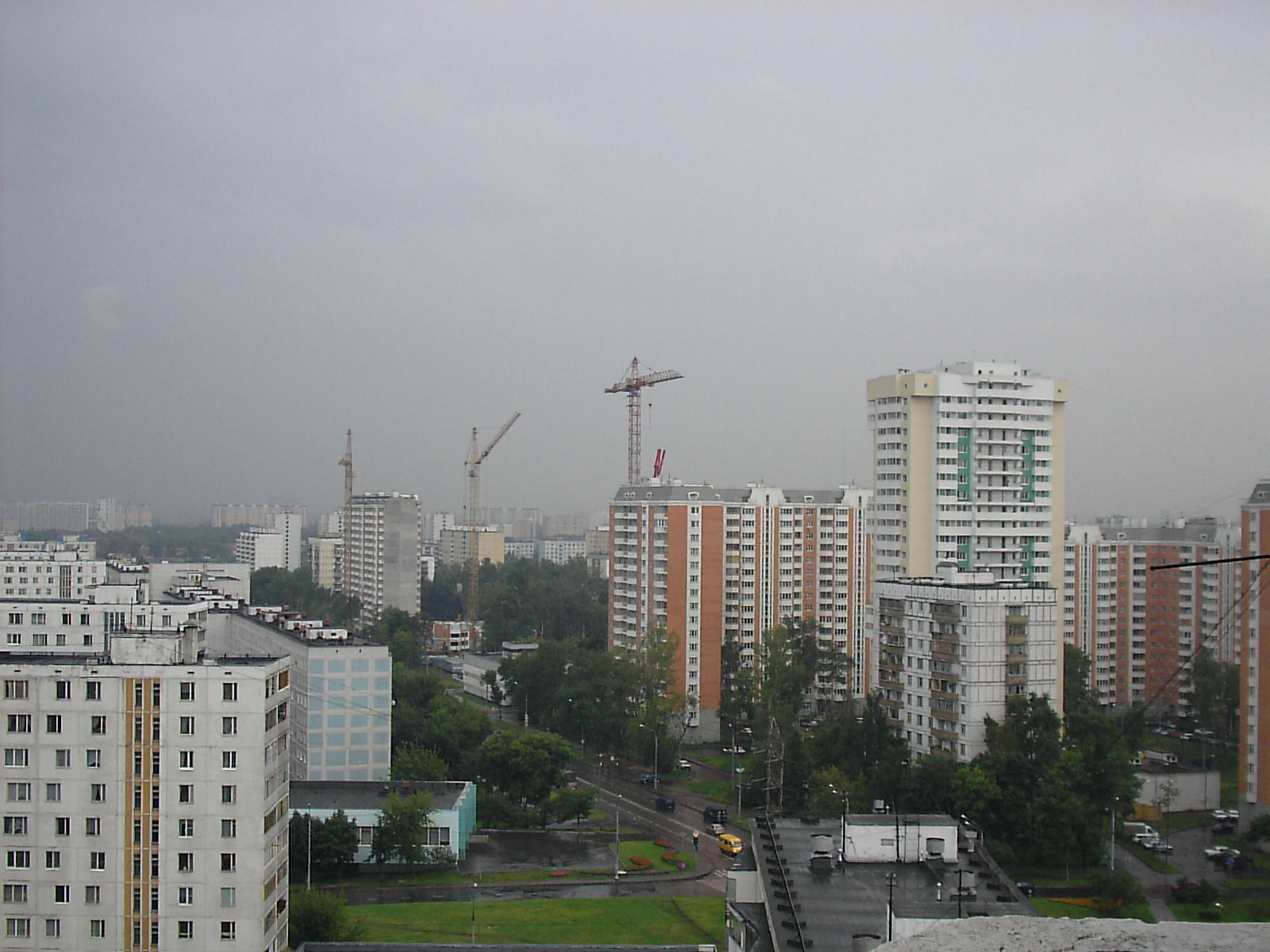
- In Yuzhnoye Medvedkovo District

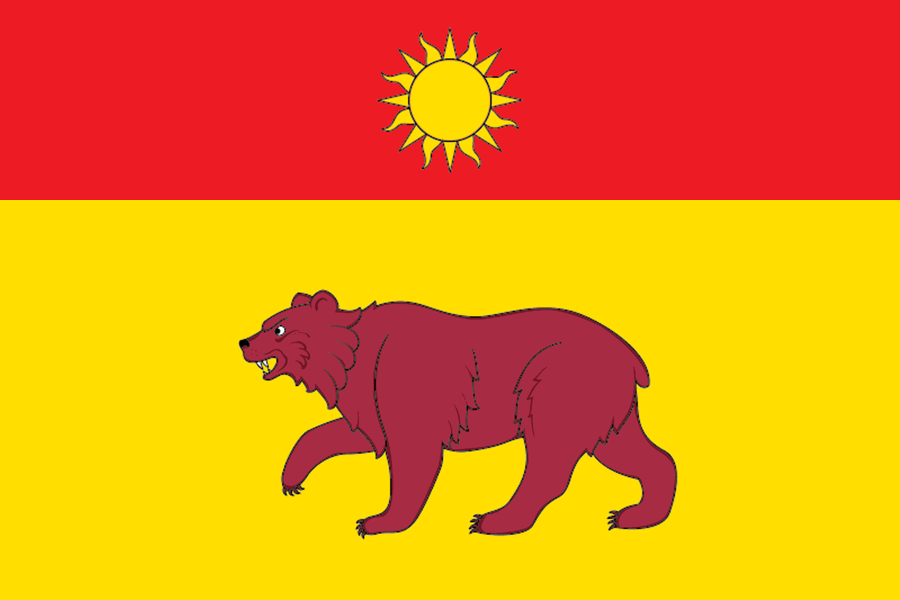
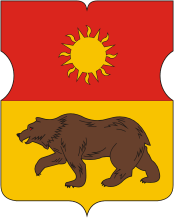
- Flag Coat of arms
- Location of Yuzhnoye Medvedkovo District in Moscow (pre-2012 map)
- Coordinates: 55°52′N 37°39′E
- Country: Russia
- Federal subject: Federal city of Moscow

Area
  - Total: 3.875 km^{2} (1.496 sq mi)

Population (2010 Census)
  - Total: 81,986
  - Density: 21,160/km^{2} (54,800/sq mi)

Municipal structure
  - Municipally incorporated as: Yuzhnoye Medvedkovo Municipal Okrug
- Time zone: UTC+
- OKTMO ID: 45364000
- Website: http://medvedkovo-juzhnoe.mos.ru

Population of Yuzhnoye Medvedkovo District
- 2010 Census: 81,986
- 2002 Census: 72,716

Yuzhnoye Medvedkovo District (Russian: райо́н Ю́жное Медве́дково) is a territorial division (a district, or raion) in North-Eastern Administrative Okrug, one of the 125 in the federal city of Moscow, Russia. It is located in the north of the federal city. The area of the district is 3.875 square kilometers (1.496 sq mi). As of the 2010 Census, the total population of the district was 81,986.

As a municipal division, the district is incorporated as Yuzhnoye Medvedkovo Municipal Okrug.
