= Bandit Petersburg =

Russian detective television series

- Country of origin: Russia
- Original language: Russian

Original release
- Release: 2000 – 2007

Bandit Petersburg (or Gangster Petersburg, Russian: Бандитский Петербург) is a Russian detective television series. It was one of the most successful Russian series of the early 2000s. The series is loosely based on the eight works of Andrei Konstantinov.

The first two parts premiered in May 2000 on the NTV channel. In total, ten seasons were produced, the last of which was broadcast in 2007. The only character who appears in 9 seasons (except the film The Operative), is Lieutenant Colonel Kudasov by Yevgeny Sidikhin.

== Music ==
The series' theme song is The City that isn't there, by singer and composer Igor Kornelyuk, and lyricist Regina Lisits . Part I of the series also features You're a Stranger To Me by Tatiana Bulanova as a secondary theme.

== Anachronism ==
Although the events of the series are portrayed as taking place in the late 1980s to early 1990s, anachronistic objects such as car models, mobile phones, personal computers, signage and media appear in the series; even gravestones with dates from the late 1990s appear.

== Cast ==
- Yevgeny Sidikhin as Lieutenant Colonel Nikita Nikitich Kudasov – Season 1–4, 6–10
- Aleksandr Domogarov as Andrei Seregin (Obnorsky), the Journalist – Season 1–6
- Lev Borisov as Viktor Govorov (Antibiotic, the Criminal Authority ) – Season 1–6
- Mikhail Razumovsky as Detective Alexander Zverev – Season 4–7, 9
- Alexander Romantsov as Banker Nikolai Naumov (Kolya-Vanya) – Season 4–7
- Andrei Tolubeyev as Deputy ORB Head Gennady Vaschanov – Season 1–3, 5
- Yan Tsapnik as Igor Nikiforov, the Journalist (Seregin's colleague) – Season 3, 7–10
- Alexander Peskov as Vladimir Dmitrievich Nefedov (Businessman and Crime Boss) – season 7–10
- Yuri Itskov as Valentin Losev (Kingpin Prongs) – season 7–10
- Dmitry Pevtsov as Sergei Aleksandrovich Chelishchev (Black Attorney) – Season 2
- Aleksei Serebryakov as Oleg Zvantsev (White Attorney) – Season 2
- Olga Drozdova / Anna Samokhina as Catherina Zvantseva (childhood friend and sweetheart of both attorneys) – Season 2 (4–6)
- Kirill Lavrov as Yuri Aleksandrovich Mikheev (Kingpin Baron) – Season 1
- Evgeniya Kryukova as Lydia Pospelova (Investigator) – Season 1

== Series structure ==
The series can be divided into two parts:

- Seasons 1 to 6, released from 2000–2003, were set in the 1990s, and featured topics involving bandit lawlessness and corruption in law enforcement.
- Seasons 7 to 10, released during 2005–2007, had mostly new characters, was set in more recent times and featured topics that involved big business.

Seasons based on the works of Konstantinov

1. The Baron (2000) – 5 episodes
2. The Lawyer (2000) – 10 episodes
3. The Fall of Antibiotic (2001) – 8 episodes
4. The Prisoner (2003) – 7 episodes
5. The Operative (2003) – 5 episodes
6. The Journalist (2003) – 7 episodes

Seasons based on the works of other writers

1. Redistribution (2005) – 12 episodes (the script was written based on a concept of Andrei Konstantinov
2. Terminal (2006) – 12 episodes
3. Dutch Passage (2006) – 12 episodes
4. Payback (2007) – 12 episodes

== Reaction of Konstantinov to the later episodes ==
Konstantinov said that the series Bandit Petersburg consisted of 7 parts rather than 10, since, in his opinion, Terminal, Dutch Passage and Payback were taken in violation of copyright. Unlike the DVD, these films were broadcast without use of Bandit Petersburg in the title, although the title was listed in channel information.

== Sources ==
The original books were:

- The Attorney
- The Justice
- Attorney 2
- The Thief
- Journalist 2
- The Writer
- The Inventor
- Writer 2
- The Prisoner
- The Cop
- The Scavenger
- four works by other writers
