= Denis Parfenov =

Russian politician

Denis Parfenov MP
- Денис Парфенов
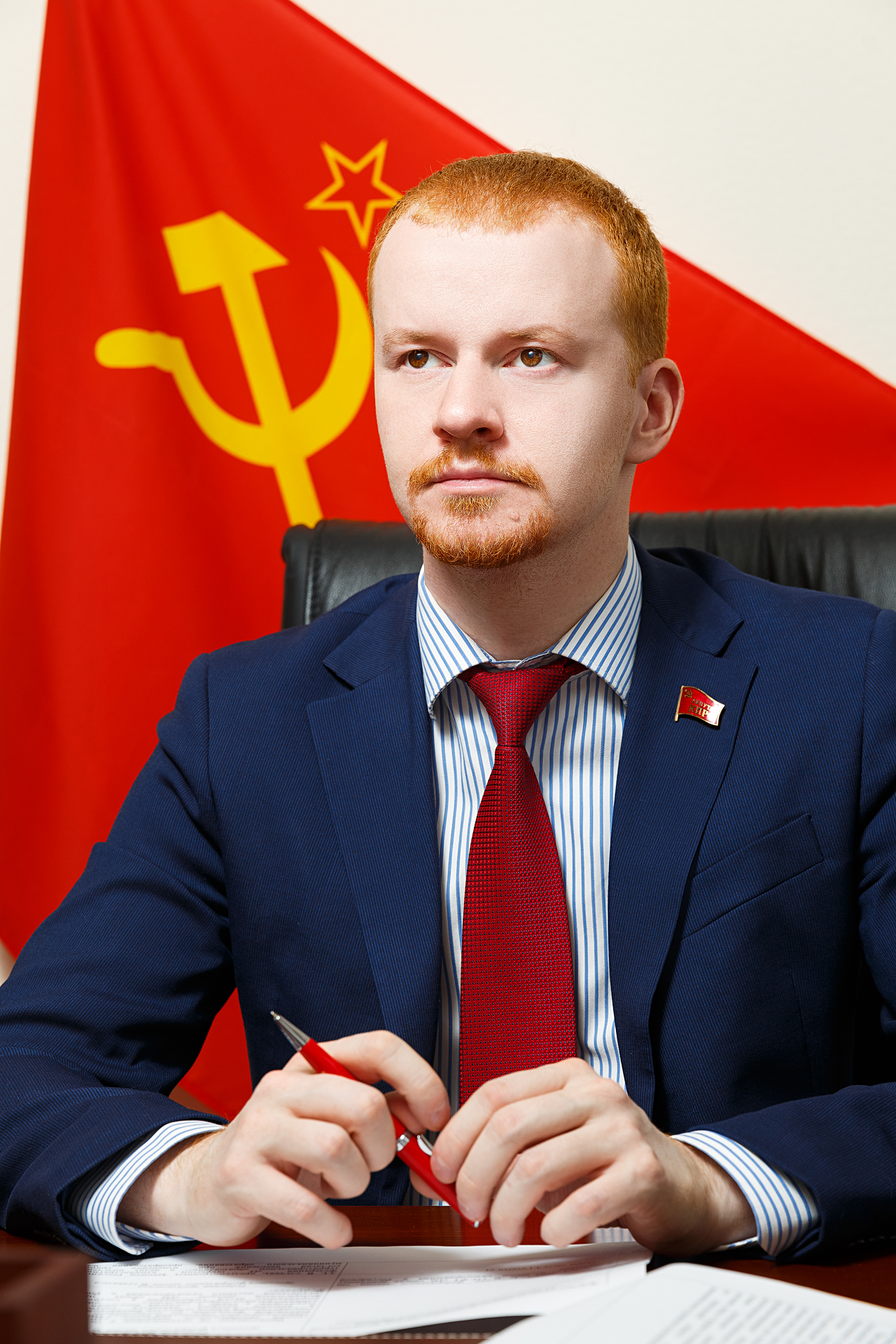

Member of the State Duma (Party List Seat)
- Incumbent
- Assumed office 12 October 2021

Member of the State Duma for Moscow
- In office 5 October 2016 – 12 October 2021
- Preceded by: constituency re-established
- Succeeded by: Dmitry Pevtsov
- Constituency: Medvedkovo (No. 200)

Personal details
- Born: 22 September 1987 (age 39) Moscow, RSFSR, USSR
- Party: Communist
- Education: Moscow State University

Denis Andreevich Parfenov (Russian: Денис Андреевич Парфенов; born 22 September 1987, Moscow) is a Russian political figure and a deputy of the 7th and 8th State Dumas.

In 2005, Parvenov joined the Russian Communist Youth League. Two years later, he became a member of the Communist Party of the Russian Federation. From 2009 to 2011, he worked at the Sberbank. From 2012 to 2016, he worked as an assistant to the deputy of the State Duma. In December 2014, he was elected Secretary of the Communist Party of the Russian Federation for agitation and propaganda. In 2016, he was elected deputy of the 7th State Duma. Since September 2021, he has served as deputy of the 8th State Duma from the Moscow constituency.

== International Sanctions ==
Due to his support for Russian aggression and the violation of Ukraine's territorial integrity during the Russian-Ukrainian war, he is under personal international sanctions imposed by various countries.

On February 23, 2022, he was added to the European Union sanctions list for actions and policies that undermine the territorial integrity, sovereignty, and independence of Ukraine and further destabilize Ukraine.

On February 24, 2022, he was included in Canada’s sanctions list of "close regime associates" for voting to recognize the "so-called republics in Donetsk and Luhansk" as independent.

On March 24, 2022, amid Russia’s invasion of Ukraine, he was added to the U.S. sanctions list for "complicity in Putin’s war" and for "supporting the Kremlin’s efforts to invade Ukraine.". The U.S. Department of State stated that State Duma deputies use their powers to persecute dissent and political opponents, suppress freedom of information, and restrict human rights and fundamental freedoms of Russian citizens.

On similar grounds, since March 11, 2022, he has been under sanctions imposed by the United Kingdom. Since February 25, 2022 — by Switzerland. Since February 26, 2022 — by Australia. Since April 12, 2022 — by Japan. By a decree of Ukrainian President Volodymyr Zelenskyy on September 7, 2022, he is also under Ukrainian sanctions. Since May 3, 2022 — by New Zealand.
