= Evgeniya Kryukova =

Russian actress

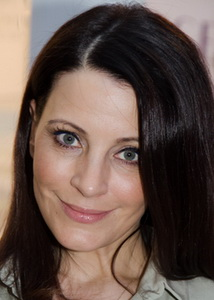
- Kryukova in 2013
- Born: Evgeniya Vladislavovna Kryukova; 11 June 1971; Moscow, USSR
- Occupation: actress
- Years active: 1990 –
- Awards: Honored Artist of the RSFSR

Evgeniya Vladislavovna Kryukova (Russian: Евге́ния Владисла́вовна Крю́кова) is a Soviet and Russian film and theater actress.

== Biography and career ==
Evgeniya Kryukova was born in 1971 into a family of engineers. After high school, she entered the Moscow Architectural Institute, out of which she dropped out; she left the institute from the first course.

In 1988, Kryukova got a job as an artist at the Moscow Youth Theatre of Vyacheslav Spesivtsev. Then she married for the first time, to the actor Mikhail Zhukov, with whom she began to appear on stage as an actress. She began working as an extra, but even then she was liked by the public for her unique appearance and expressive eyes. Her husband assisted her with her acting career.

She entered to study at an extramural department of GITIS in 1990. Spesivtsev's troupe mainly consisted of students and graduates of Mikhail Shchepkin Higher Theatre School. One day when she was in the audience of a student performance in the school, Kryukova received an offer from Belarusfilm to star in a movie. However, her debut in the picture did not happen; the episodes with her small role were cut, but her desire to become an actress only became stronger.

Kryukova appeared for the first time in cinema in 1990. Then, French porn directors Francis Leroi and François Jouffa arrived in Moscow and invited her to star in his erotic film Sex et perestroika. She also played Grand Duchess Tatiana in Karen Shakhnazarov's historical and psychological drama The Assassin of the Tsar, Raisa in Anatoly Kokorin's romantic war drama Roly-Poly, as well as a prominent role in Valentin Mishatkin's comedy Meet me in Tahiti.

In the third year of GITIS (1993), Kryukova began performing in the Mossovet Theatre. Here she continued to work after graduation in 1994 (course director – Paul Chomsky). On the stage of this theater, she played many roles. She received widespread exposure with the TV series St. Petersburg Secrets and Decoupling Petersburg Secrets, where she played Yulia Beroeva. Kryukova then starred in the TV series Dossier Detective Dubrovsky and Bandit Petersburg (as Pospelova the investigator).

In 2003, the film director Eldar Ryazanov invited Kryukova to play a main role in his comedy The Key of Bedroom. Another one of her works was a role in the film About Love, directed by Sergei Solovyov and based on the stories of Anton Chekhov.

== Selected filmography ==
- Sex et perestroika (1990) as Zhenya
- The Assassin of the Tsar (1991) as Tatiana Nikolaevna
- Bandit Petersburg (2000) as Lydia Pospelova, investigator
- The Key of Bedroom (2003) as Aglaya
- Hamlet. XXI Century (2009) as Gertrude
- The Return of the Musketeers, or The Treasures of Cardinal Mazarin (2009) as Louise de La Vallière
- Buy Me (2017) as Olga, Katya's mother

Music video

- Igor Nadzhiev: Scarlet Flower (directed by Georgi Yungvald-Khilkevich; 1997)

== Awards ==
- Honored Artist of RSFSR (2005)
