= Mother (1990 film) =

1990 film

- Film poster
- Directed by: Gleb Panfilov
- Written by: Gleb Panfilov; Maxim Gorky
- Produced by: Lionello Santi
- Starring: Inna Churikova
- Cinematography: Mikhail Agranovich; Alexander Ilkhovsky
- Edited by: E. Galinka
- Music by: Vadim Bibergan
- Production companies: Mosfilm; Cinefilm Ltd.
- Release date: 1990
- Running time: 200 minutes
- Countries: Soviet Union; Italy
- Language: Russian

Mother (Russian: Мать, translit. Mat, also known as Zapreshchyonnye lyudi) is a 1990 Soviet historical drama film based on Maxim Gorky's novels The Mother (1906) and The Life of a Useless Man (1908) and short story "Karamora" (1923), directed by Gleb Panfilov and co-produced with Italy. It was entered into the 1990 Cannes Film Festival.

== Cast ==
- Inna Churikova as Pelageya Nilovna Vlasova
- Viktor Rakov as Pavel Vlasov
- Liubomiras Laucevičius as Mikhail Vlasov
- Alexey Buldakov as Stepan Somov
- Aleksandr Shishonok as Pavel Vlasov in childhood
- Dmitry Pevtsov as Yakov Somov
- Aleksandr Karin as Andrey Anisimovich Nakhodka
- Ivan Kabardin as Yakov Somov in childhood
- Vladimir Prozorov as Evsey Klimkov
- Vladimir Fateyev as Evsey Klimkov in childhood
- Olga Shukshina as Natasha
- Antonella Interlenghi as Sasha
- Andrei Rostotsky as Nicholas II
- Sergey Makovetsky as Ryleyev
- Innokenty Smoktunovsky as governor
- Ernst Romanov as Egor Ivanovich
- Aleksandr Dedyushko as revolutionary
- Gleb Plaksin as judge
