= Olga Budina =

Russian theater and film actress

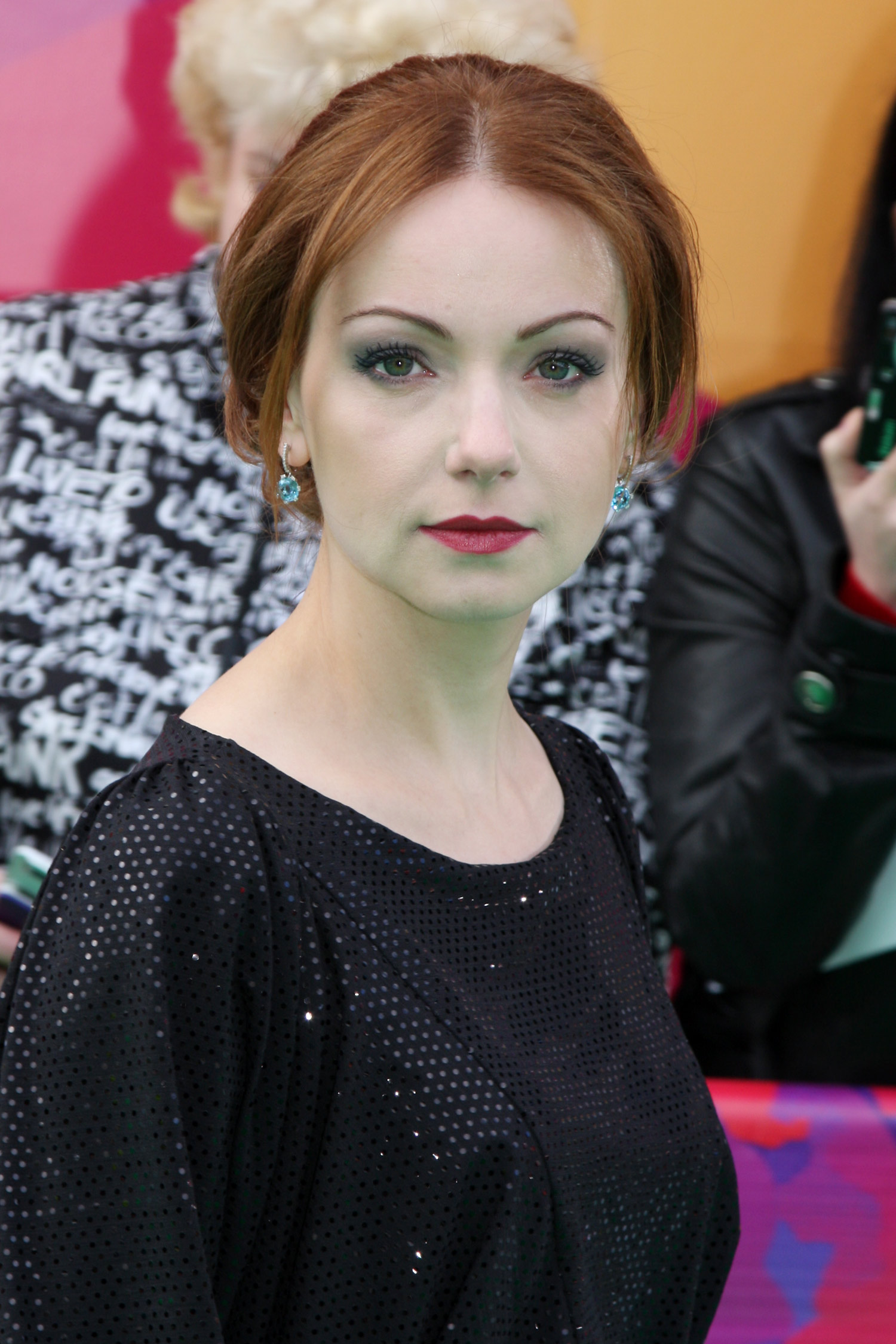
- XXXII International Film Festival
- Born: February 22, 1975 (age 51); Odintsovo, Moscow Oblast, RSFSR, USSR
- Occupation: Actress
- Years active: 1996–present
- Spouse: Aleksandr Naumov (divorced)
- Children: Naum Naumov

Olga Alexandrovna Budina (Russian: О́льга Алекса́ндровна Бу́дина, born 22 February 1975) is a Russian theater and film actress.

== Biography ==
Olga Budina was born in Odintsovo, Moscow Oblast, Russian SFSR, Soviet Union. She studied history and literature at the Lyceum college. She was actively involved in social work and was a creative student in her school years. She learned to play accordion and piano. The Lyceum Theatre created its own musical "The Princess and the Pea" in which she was a soloist of the school choir and orchestra. She performed at a school dance as a part of amateur vocal and instrumental ensemble, where she was invited as a soloist. After the ninth grade of high school she tried to enter the State School of Music Gnesin. Having failed, she returned to school to obtain secondary (full) general education. While in high school, she graduated from the School of Olga Budina young philology at Moscow State University. Qualified as a category 3 guide, she conducted tours of the Pushkin village Zakharovo located near Odintsova.

A year after graduation, Olga Budina planned to re-enter the Gnessin School, but then changed her mind in favor of the Supreme Shchukin Drama School. Having obtained the maximum score in the entrance test, Olga became a student of the 'University Theater Examination Commission' led by Vladimir Etush.

Artistic Director Olga Budina the Shchukin School became Marina Panteleyeva. The first time was given to Olga Study hard. At the first session, it had suspended all offsets, and even the question was about her dismissal. With a great effort, Olga managed to catch up in their studies, and in the second year, she received the highest score on the actor's skill.

While studying in her second year, Olga Budina received an offer from Mosfilm to work in the short film Game „The Little Prince“. However, the tape did not come out in the rental.

Olga Budina secured her first role as a movie actress in Gleb Panfilov's film The Romanovs: An Imperial Family, portraying the professional Grand Duchess Anastasia Nikolaevna as a student of the fourth course.

In 2000, Olga Budina gained national popularity in the movie by Alexander Mitta Border: Taiga Novel. In the same year, the film was played at the opening of the Moscow Film Festival XXII.

== Charity ==
For several years, Budina has supported an orphanage in Uglich. In 2011, her charitable foundation allocated two million rubles for renovations to the building, during which misuse of budget funds was uncovered.

On 27 December 2012, Budina stated on the programme Live on Russia-1 that conditions at the institution were appalling and that there was corruption there. The incident attracted the attention of the Investigative Committee of the Russian Federation, and in January 2013 criminal cases were opened against the orphanage's management. Although on 1 February 2013 the prosecutor's office, citing the results of its investigation, rejected the actress's claims, on 30 May of that year, the case against the director under Part 3 of Article 160 (misappropriation) and Part 1 of Article 286 (abuse of authority) was referred to court.

== Public position ==
Budina supported the Russian invasion of Ukraine and later urged mothers to prepare their children for the war. She was later included by the Anti-Corruption Foundation on its list of "corrupt officials and warmongers" for supporting the actions of the Russian authorities during the aggression against Ukraine.

In 2023, the actress said that she perceived certain "Western values" in the Russian film Cheburashka.

On 28 April, she stated that "the authorities" had deliberately instilled in women the idea that they too were people in order to collect taxes from them.

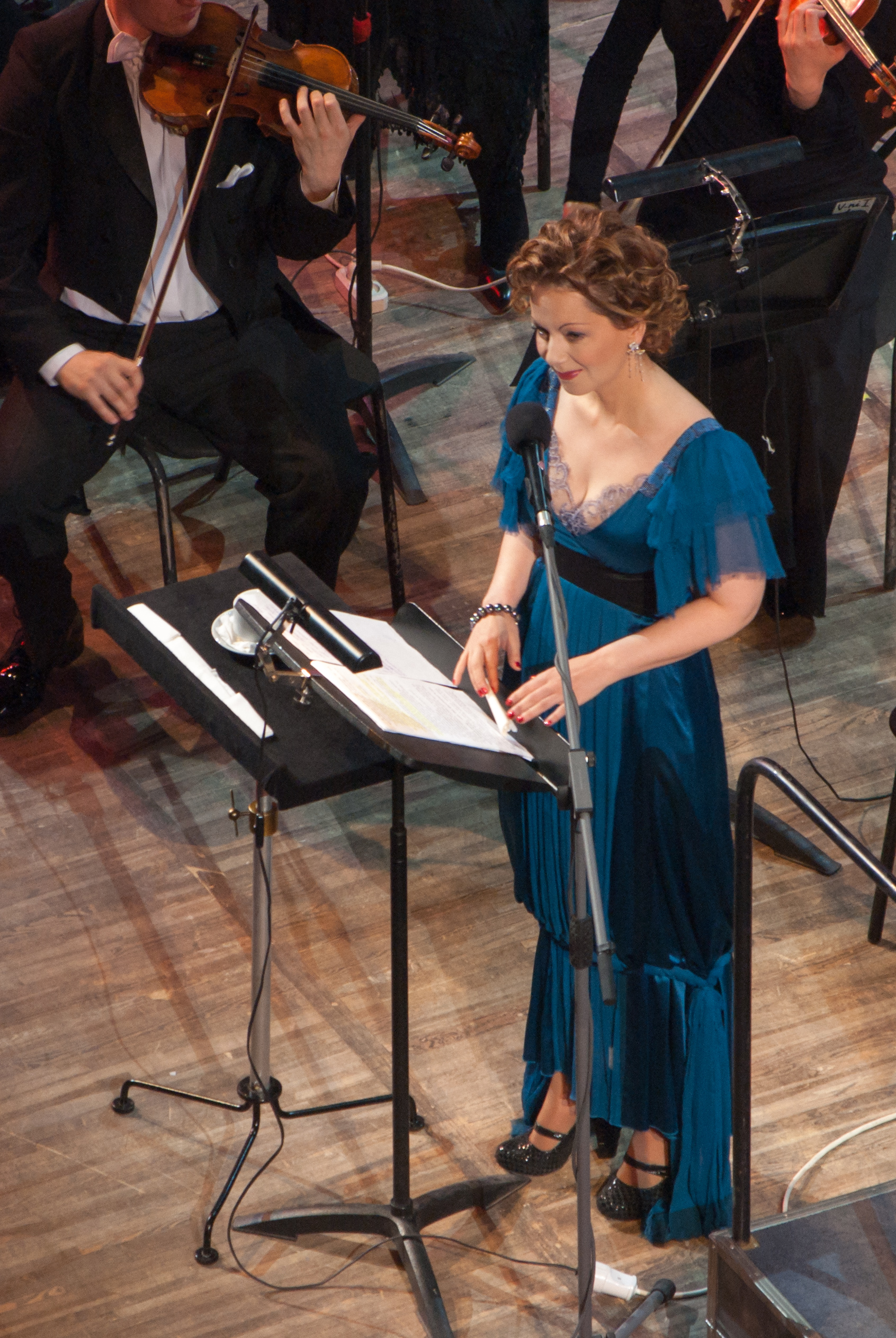
Olga Budina at the Concert Hall named. Tchaikovsky. January 2013.

== Personal life ==
Olga Budina was married to businessman Alexander Naumov; they are now divorced. They had a son named Naum.

== Filmography ==
| Year | Title | Role | Notes |
|---|---|---|---|
| 1996 | Game „The Little Prince“ | actress | Short film |
| 1998 | Ne poslat' ly nam gontsa? | Vika | |
| 1999 | Dosye detektiva Dubrovskogo | Lera | TV series |
| 1999 | Tsvety ot pobediteley | Liza | |
| 2000 | The Romanovs: A Royal Family | Grand Duchess Anastasia Nikolaevna of Russia | |
| 2000 | Check | clerk | |
| 2000 | His Wife's Diary | Galina Plotnikova | |
| 2000 | Empire under Attack | Olga | |
| 2000 | Border: Taiga Novel | Marina Goloschekina | TV series |
| 2001 | Down House | Maria | |
| 2001 | Salome | Salome | TV series |
| 2002 | Railroad Romance | Vera | TV |
| 2003 | The Idiot | Aglaia Yepanchina | TV |
| 2003 | Joys and Sorrows of a Little Lord | Nora | |
| 2003 | Bajazet | Olga Khvoshchinskaya | TV series |
| 2004 | Moscow Saga | Nina Gradova-Kitaigorodskaya | TV series |
| 2006 | Stalin's Wife | Nadezhda Alliluyeva | Mini-series |
| 2007 | Private Life of Dr. Selivanova | Elena Selivanova, gynecologist | TV series |
| 2007 | Necklaces for Snow Woman | Katya | TV |
| 2008 | Heavy Sand | Elena Moiseyevna, Levii's wife | TV series |
| 2008 | Equation without unknown variables | Anna Samoylova | TV |
| 2008 | Phoenix Syndrome | Tatiana | Mini-series |
| 2010 | Dr. Zemsky | Dr. Olga Samoylova | TV series |
| 2010 | Mother's Heart | Vera Guryanova, criminal prosecutor | TV series |
| 2013 | Einstein. Theory of love | Margarita | Mini-series |
| 2014 | Mystery idol | | TV series |
