= The Romanovs: An Imperial Family =

- DVD cover
- Directed by: Gleb Panfilov
- Written by: Gleb Panfilov; Ivan Panfilov; Inna Churikova
- Produced by: Vladimir Bychkov
- Starring: Aleksandr Galibin; Lynda Bellingham; Yuliya Novikova; Kseniya Kachalina; Olga Budina; Olga Vasilyeva; Vladimir Grachyov; Aleksandr Filippenko
- Cinematography: Mikhail Agranovich
- Edited by: Enzo Meniconi
- Music by: Vadim Bibergan
- Distributed by: Studio Vera (Russia)
- Release date: 9 March 2001
- Running time: 135 minutes
- Country: Russia
- Language: Russian
- Budget: $ 18 million

The Romanovs: An Imperial Family (Russian: Романовы. Венценосная семья, Romanovy: Ventsenosnaya semya) is a 2000 Russian historical drama film about the last days of Tsar Nicholas II and his family. The Russian title implies both the Imperial Crown of Russia and the crown of thorns associated with martyrs. The film premiered at the 22nd annual Moscow Film Festival. The film was selected as the Russian entry for the Best Foreign Language Film at the 76th Academy Awards, but it didn't make the final shortlist.

== Plot ==
The film begins on the night of February 22, 1917, before the Tsar departs to the war front of Stavka. Russia under Tsar Nicholas II was in the third year of World War I. By 1917, Russia had suffered many losses. Nevertheless, the tsar's authority with the people was high. Petrograd (formerly St. Petersburg) was an exception. Late at night, Nicholas and Alexandra are woken up by their son, Alexei who has a high fever, as well as Olga, the eldest of the five children. The next morning, Nicholas leaves for Stavka, at the war front. Meanwhile, in Petrograd, people are starting to revolt. A street is bombed and many are killed. The Russian Revolution has started. Nicholas arrives at Stavka and he is told that his son Alexei, a hemophiliac, will live until the age of 16. Back in Petrograd, Alexandra is told about the chaos in the city. At the Imperial Train, Nicholas is given documents requesting his abdication. He signs and is no longer Emperor of All the Russias. He had decided to give the throne to his son Alexei, but due to his condition, he decides to give the throne to his brother Michael, who does not accept it. Russia is left without an emperor.

At the Winter Palace, Alexandra is told that she and her husband are no longer Emperor and Empress and that they are now under house arrest. Alexandra asks M. Gilliard, the Swiss tutor, to tell her Alexei the news. Nicholas, no longer tsar, returns to his family at the Alexander Palace. The next day, Nicholas, Alexandra, the two older Grand Duchesses, and Alexei are introduced to Alexander Kerensky, the leader of the Provisional Government. Olga does not seem to like him; while Tatiana says that he does not respect the former tsar and tsarina because they are private citizens. Alexandra is hurt by this and Tatiana tells her that she's getting bald. Olga reassures her mother that it is normal that she and her sisters are losing their hair because they have been sick with measles. Alexandra decides to shave her children's heads. One night Alexandra wakes up, screaming. She tells Nicholas that she had a dream in which Grigori Rasputin showed her a vision of the future.

On August 1, 1917, the Imperial Family and four of their loyal servants leave the Palace for the last time. They see Nicholas's brother Michael Alexandrovich before departing. They are transferred to Tobolsk, a village in Siberia, to live in the Governor's Mansion under house arrest. The Grand Duchesses continue their everyday lives. They play the piano while Alexei draws ships. One day, Olga is playing the piano when a guard downstairs is playing another song on the mandolin, his name is Andrei Denisov. Olga starts playing the same song that Denisov is playing. Olga, Alexei, Tatiana, Maria and Anastasia start dancing as he keeps playing the mandolin. The Imperial Family and their former servants live a simple life. Their everyday lives consist of cutting wood, snow sledding, and family dinners. One day, Olga and Denisov fall in love with each other. With another revolution comes another change in the Russian Government. In November 1917, the Bolsheviks overthrow the Provisional Government, resulting in the creation of the first Soviet Republic. The family is photographed and new, more aggressive guards are brought in. Olga Nikolaevna is sick once again and needs a blood transfusion. Denisov is the donor as Alexandra cannot do it. Olga recovers and she and Nicholas play the piano together. The new Soviet government decides to transfer the Imperial Family to a new location. Yakovlev, a commissar of the Ural Soviet, visits the Imperial Family in Tobolsk. He talks to Alexei and asks the maid Demidova to check his temperature. Because of Alexei's bad health, only Nicholas, Alexandra, Maria, and the servants leave for Ekaterinburg in April 1918; Alexei, Olga, Tatiana, Anastasia, and M. Gilliard are left behind. A few weeks later they also are transferred to the Ipatiev House in Ekaterinburg. After they are reunited, the commandant, Yurovsky, allows the family to have an Orthodox church service. The next day, a priest comes to give a mass for the family. In the following days, the kitchen boy, Sednev is let go to be with his uncle.

On the night of July 16, 1918, the Ural Soviet receives an order to execute the Imperial Family. While everyone sleeps, Yurovsky and the other guards are planning the execution. Shortly after midnight on July 17, the guards awaken Dr. Botkin. He is told that everybody is to come to the cellar for safety, as the White Army is getting closer. The family and their servants are led downstairs into a cellar. The guards bring in two chairs for Alexei and Alexandra; everybody else stands. Yurovsky tells everyone that there are rumors that the family is dead and that they will take a picture to put an end to it. He arranges them into position, but then suddenly reads to Nicholas an execution order. Nicholas is shocked, Alexandra and her daughters cross themselves. The guards draw their guns and shoot. Not everyone is dead immediately, so they shoot the survivors individually. As they clear the bodies, the guards discover diamonds hidden in the family's clothes. The film then switches to the canonization of Tsar Nicholas II and his family. This is the last scene before the end of the film.

== Cast ==
- Aleksandr Galibin as Tsar Nicholas II (voiced by Viktor Rakov)
- Lynda Bellingham as Tsarina Alexandra (voiced by Inna Churikova)
- Yuliya Novikova as Olga Nikolaevna
- Kseniya Kachalina as Tatiana Nikolaevna
- Olga Vasilyeva as Maria Nikolaevna
- Olga Budina as Anastasia Nikolaevna
- Vladimir Grachyov as Alexei Nikolaevich, Tsarevich of Russia
- Aleksandr Filippenko as Vladimir Lenin
- Igor Dmitriev as Count Freedericksz
- Yuri Kayurov as General Mikhail Alekseyev
- Yuri Klepikov as General Lavr Kornilov
- Oleg Basilashvili as Professor Sergey Fedorov
- Vladimir Konkin as Colonel Eugene Kobylinsky
- Ernst Romanov as Dr Eugene Botkin
- Andrey Kharitonov as Pierre Gilliard
- Mikhail Yefremov as Alexander Kerensky
- Vsevolod Sobolev as Dr Vladimir Derevenko
- Anatoly Slivnikov as Mikhail Rodzyanko
- Aristarkh Livanov as Pavel Milyukov
- Valery Kukhareshin as Leon Trotsky
- Igor Sklyar as Vasily Yakovlev
- Yevgeni Gerasimov as Filipp Goloshchyokin
- Liubomiras Laucevičius as Yakov Yurovsky
- Igor Lifanov as Sergey Maslovsky

== Production ==
- The photographs Nicholas is looking at while he sits on the toilet in the Ipatiev house are actual photographs of the real Imperial family.
- All actors portraying the grand duchesses Olga, Tatiana, Maria, Anastasia and Alexei had their hair shaved for the movie. In real life the daughters and heir were indeed sick and had their heads shaved. Although, their hair never grows back despite the fact that they still lived for about 13 months. In fact, two wash girls, who last saw the four Grand Duchess two days before their deaths, reported that their hair had just reached their chins.
- British actress Lynda Bellingham (Empress Alexandra) had her lines dubbed into Russian by writer Inna Churikova.
- Outside and inside shots were actually taken at the Alexander Palace, the official home of Tsar Nicholas II and his family. Inside shots included the Tsar's study, although the rooms of the Grand Duchesses were recreated from water colors and photographs.
- The dresses the Grand Duchesses wear as they dance around the room at Tobolsk are replicas of the actual dresses worn in the 1914 formal photo-shoot.
- When the family is resting by the lake, while they travel to Toblosk, Nicholas lets photographs fall from his shirt. The photographs are of Mathilde Kschessinska, Nicholas' first lover before he married Alexandra.
- The Governor's Mansion in Tobolsk still exists and is now a museum.
- The Ipatiev House no longer exists. It was demolished in 1977. In its place is a church known as the Church of Blood.

== Accolades ==
- (2000) “Golden Aries” award for Best Production design (Alexander Boim, Vladimir Gudilin, Anatoly Panfilov)
- (2001) International Moscow Human Rights Film Festival “Stalker”. Directors Guild Award (Gleb Panfilov)
- (2003) St. Petersburg Governor's prize for cinematic score (Vadim Bibergan)

== Critical response ==
Victor Matizen rated the film 7 out of 10. He said, "the preconceived notion that everything will end in the basement of the Ipatiev House leaves us with no hope for a different outcome and imbues the film with a suspense independent of the direction. It's as if you were put on a train and sent down the tracks toward a chasm with no railway bridge across it". Tatyana Moskvina noted in her book "A Man's Notebook": "Among the film's shortcomings, I would include the lengthy landscape scenes, the somewhat clumsy nature of some of the dialogue, the not always successful makeup (especially for the Bolsheviks), and the primness and dryness of Linda Belingham, whose performance leaves no doubt that we are dealing with the granddaughter of Queen Victoria, but adds almost nothing to this". According to Sergei Solovyov, "Gleb Panfilov is a man of inner independence and dignity, and he has carried this through time. The film is unique in its unfashionability. The Romanovs were in vogue a year ago, and foreign film studios, by making a film about the royal family, demonstrated a complete misunderstanding of our history. Gleb Panfilov's 'The Romanovs' is a striking picture of Russians about Russia, a genuine, unfeigned drama. This isn't a case of liking a film or not. We must look at ourselves".

== See also ==
- List of films about the Romanovs
- List of submissions to the 75th Academy Awards for Best Foreign Language Film
- List of Russian submissions for the Academy Award for Best Foreign Language Film
