= I Want the Floor =

- Theatrical release poster
- Russian: Прошу слова
- Directed by: Gleb Panfilov
- Written by: Gleb Panfilov
- Starring: Inna Churikova; Nikolai Gubenko; Leonid Bronevoy; Vasily Shukshin
- Cinematography: Alexander Antipenko
- Music by: Vadim Bibergan
- Production company: Lenfilm
- Release date: 29 November 1976
- Running time: 145 min.
- Country: Soviet Union
- Language: Russian

I Want the Floor (Russian: Прошу слова, romanized: Proshu slova) is a 1975 Soviet drama film written and directed by Gleb Panfilov.

== Plot ==
The film tells about a strong woman, Yelizaveta Uvarova, who becomes the chairwoman of the city executive committee of Zlatograd.

== Cast ==
- Inna Churikova as Yelizaveta Andreyevna Uvarova
- Nikolai Gubenko as Sergei Uvarov
- Ekaterina Volkova as Lena
- Leonid Bronevoy as Pyotr Vasilyevich Altukhov
- Vasily Shukshin as Fyodor (voiced by Igor Yefimov)
- Valentina Kovel as Tanechka
- Dmitry Bessonov as Spartak Ivanovich
- Vadim Medvedev as Vladimir Vikentyevich
- Nikolai Sergeyev as Stepan Trofimovich Bushuyev
- Ernst Romanov as Kozlov
