= The Beginning (film) =

- Directed by: Gleb Panfilov
- Written by: Gleb Panfilov; Yevgeni Gabrilovich
- Produced by: A. Tarasov
- Starring: Inna Churikova; Leonid Kuravlyov; Mikhail Kononov
- Cinematography: Dmitri Dolinin
- Edited by: Maria Amosova
- Music by: Vadim Bibergan
- Production company: Lenfilm
- Release date: October 12, 1970
- Running time: 91 minutes
- Country: Soviet Union
- Language: Russian

The Beginning (Russian: Начало, romanized: Nachalo) is a 1970 Soviet romantic drama film directed by Gleb Panfilov and starring Inna Churikova as Pasha, a factory worker and small-time actress whose life is transformed first by falling in love with Arkady (Leonid Kuravlyov), who she would later learn is married, and then by being offered the lead in a feature film about Joan of Arc.

== Plot ==
The film follows two intertwined storylines. The first centers on the life of Pasha Stroganova, a modest textile worker from the small town of Rechensk. Plain in appearance, she spends her days working at the factory, going to dances, and playing Baba Yaga in a local amateur theater group. One night at a dance, she meets and immediately falls in love with Arkady. Around the same time, a director from the city attends one of her performances and, unexpectedly, offers her a role in a major film playing Joan of Arc. This begins the second storyline—a film within a film, unfolding the story of the legendary French heroine.

The film's production is fraught with challenges, as the rest of the crew struggles to understand what the director sees in this unassuming provincial actress. Meanwhile, Pasha learns that Arkady is married, putting her love for him in jeopardy. After a fight with his wife, Arkady moves in with Pasha, but his wife eventually forces him back home, leaving Pasha devastated. Heartbroken, she attempts suicide, but her neighbor Pavlik saves her just in time. Determined, Pasha decides to finish her role with dignity. The film becomes a huge success with audiences, but despite her newfound fame, other directors are not rushing to offer her roles. Pasha now faces a new chapter in life, one that promises to be far from easy.

The film has no opening credits and the title "The Beginning" appears on screen at the end, instead of the usual "The End".

== Cast ==
- Inna Churikova as Pasha Stroganova
- Leonid Kuravlyov as Arkady, beloved of Pasha
- Valentina Telichkina as Valya, a friend of Pasha
- Tatiana Stepanova as Katya, a friend of Pasha
- Mikhail Kononov as Pavlik, neighbor of Pasha
- Nina Skomorokhova as Zina, wife of Arkady
- Tatiana Bedova as Toma, bride of Pavlik
- Yuri Klepikov as Fedor Vasilyevich Ignatiev, director
- Gennady Beglov as Vitaly Alekseevich Odinokov, the second director
- Yuri Vizbor as Stepan Ivanovich, writer
- Vyacheslav Vasilyev as Stepan Vitalievich, assistant director
- Yevgeni Lebedev as Pierre Cauchon (voiced by Yefim Kopelyan)
