= Altufyevo =

Altufyevo may refer to:

- Altufyevsky District, also known as Altufyevo District, in Moscow, Russia
- Altufyevo Estate in northern Moscow
- Altufyevo (Metro), a Moscow Metro station
