= No Love (film) =

1991 Soviet Union film

- Russian: Нелюбовь
- Directed by: Valery Rubinchik
- Written by: Renata Litvinova
- Starring: Kseniya Kachalina; Stanislav Lyubshin; Dmitriy Roshchin
- Cinematography: Oleg Martynov
- Edited by: Natalya Dobrunova
- Production company: Mosfilm
- Release date: 1991
- Running time: 94 minutes
- Country: Soviet Union
- Language: Russian

No Love (Russian: Нелюбовь, romanized: Nelyubov) is a 1991 Soviet drama film directed by Valery Rubinchik.

Actress Kseniya Kachalina was awarded the Best Actress prize at the Kinotavr film festival.

== Plot ==
The film unfolds as a series of short episodes from the life of a young woman named Rita (portrayed by Kseniya Kachalina). During a visit to the cinema with her friend Roma, she meets a photographer (Stanislav Lyubshin), an older, reserved man who begins courting her. Rita responds to his advances while still maintaining her relationship with Roma.

Between dates, Rita spends time with her best friend Bubastisa, browsing magazine photos of Marilyn Monroe. The American actress is a recurring presence in the film—appearing in recordings, Rita’s thoughts, and dreams.

At one point, Rita takes her own photograph and writes a reflective inventory on the back, listing past lovers, expressing guilt toward her parents, admitting loneliness, tallying debts, and asking herself, "What should I do?" Her conclusion: “Nothing.” The film’s ending, in which Rita ends her life with sleeping pills, echoes the tragic fate of Marilyn Monroe, whose suffering she frequently muses on. The mystical element of Rita’s body mysteriously disappearing from her bed after her death reinforces the film’s exploration of the tragic destiny of both the character and actress Kseniya Kachalina, reflecting a theme of many women struggling to find happiness in love without sorrow and existential contemplation.

== Cast ==
- Kseniya Kachalina as Rita
- Stanislav Lyubshin as photographer
- Dmitriy Roshchin as Roma
- Genrietta Yegorova as Roma's mother
- Irina Shelamova as Bubastisa
- Yekaterina Shcherbakova as massage girl
- Viktor Remizov as driver
- Aleksandr Pozharov as stranger
