= Buy Me (film) =

- Theatrical release poster
- Russian: Купи меня
- Directed by: Vadim Perelman
- Screenplay by: Darya Gratsevich
- Produced by: Fyodor Bondarchuk; Alexey Ageyev; Semyon Slepakov; Taimuraz Badziev; Vyacheslav Dusmukhametov; Darya Gratsevich
- Starring: Yulia Khlynina; Anna Adamovich; Svetlana Ustinova
- Cinematography: Yuri Nikogosov
- Edited by: Alexey Bobrov
- Music by: Ilya Truskovsky
- Production companies: Art Pictures Studio; MEM Cinema Production
- Distributed by: Central Partnership
- Release date: March 1, 2018
- Running time: 107 minutes
- Country: Russia
- Language: Russian
- Budget: $900 000
- Box office: $399 733

Buy Me (Russian: Купи меня, romanized: Kupi menya) is a 2018 Russian crime drama film directed by Vadim Perelman. It was nominated for the Golden St. George Award at the 39th Moscow International Film Festival.

== Plot ==
Katya Korolyova from Moscow, a student of the Faculty of Philology, won a grant to study the archives of the Russian poet Vladislav Khodasevich in Paris. Without telling her mother, instead of the study trip, she went to Abu Dhabi to build a career in modeling there. As a result, she actually turned out to be among the girls who had to please the Arab sheikhs for money. Thanks to the scandal arranged by Katya, the group of models is sent back to Russia.

Returning to Moscow, Katya falls in with Liza and Galya, two provincial friends who teach her how to navigate relationships with wealthy, often married men. What begins as a shared plan for security and luxury soon forces all three to face the cost of the lives they want.

== Cast ==
- Yulia Khlynina as Katya Korolyova
- Anna Adamovich as Liza
- Svetlana Ustinova as Galya
- Mikael Janibekyan as Suren
- Ivan Dobronravov as Misha
- Evgeniya Kryukova as Olga, Katya's mother
- Alexander Oblasov as taxi driver
- Evgeniya Dmitrieva as business lady
- Klim Shipenko as anesthesiologist

== Critical response ==
Film critic Boris Ivanov in Film.ru notes in his review:

The heroines do not win special audience sympathy, but they do not need it, because you watch the film to find out what else the girls will throw out and how else they will joke. A cynical Russian comedy about girls of easy virtue, which awkwardly turns into a drama in the finale.

In turn, Zinaida Pronchenko said:

We have seen all this many, many times in films with varying degrees of unconvincingness, ridiculing the lack of spirituality in the capital. Heroes without a past and a future wander in the fog of modernity, the era is recognized by brands, gadgets, musical hits and Internet memes. But, in general, the authors do not know anything about their characters.
