= Vassa (film) =

1983 film

- Film poster
- Directed by: Gleb Panfilov
- Written by: Maxim Gorky; Gleb Panfilov
- Starring: Inna Churikova
- Cinematography: Leonid Kalashnikov
- Music by: Vadim Bibergan
- Production company: Mosfilm
- Release date: July 1983
- Running time: 140 minutes
- Country: Soviet Union
- Language: Russian

Vassa (Russian: Васса) is a 1983 Soviet drama film directed by Gleb Panfilov. It is based on Maxim Gorky's 1910 play Vassa Zheleznova. Vassa won the Golden Prize at the 13th Moscow International Film Festival. The film was also selected as the Soviet entry for the Best Foreign Language Film at the 56th Academy Awards, but was not accepted as a nominee.

The film tells the story of how a ruthless matriarch struggles to protect her family's legacy and reputation amidst betrayal, scandal, and her own impending demise in pre-revolutionary Russia.

== Plot ==
In 1913, on a garbage dump on the outskirts of Nizhny Novgorod, shipping magnate Vassa Borisovna Zheleznova watches as her one-year-old passenger steamer, named after her son Fyodor, burns and sinks into the Volga River. The ship’s destruction, valued at 300,000 rubles, is caused by the drunken negligence of sailor Shalamov, who had only been hired years ago for saving young Fyodor from drowning. Frustrated, Vassa decides to return to the city on foot when her chauffeur, Alexei Pyatorkin, delays her departure to experiment with the car engine. Back home, Vassa meets Yuri Vasilyevich Melnikov from the district court, whom she hired to mitigate the charges against her husband, Sergei Petrovich Zheleznov. Despite bribes, Melnikov reveals that the evidence—photos and testimony of Sergei caught with underage girls in a brothel—is damning, leaving Sergei facing potential conviction and hard labor. Vassa, concerned for her family's reputation and her daughters Natalia and Lyudmila, resolves to cover up the scandal at any cost.

Vassa confronts Sergei, imploring him to protect their daughters' futures and their grandson Nikolai's reputation by avoiding a public trial. She offers him poison, urging him to take it. Their heated argument is overheard by Vassa’s brother, Prokhor Borisovich Khrapov, and their maid Lisa, who is secretly pregnant with Prokhor's child. Meanwhile, Natalia learns from Melnikov’s son about her father’s impending prosecution and informs her uncle, who questions Vassa’s choice to marry the much older captain. During a family discussion, a scream echoes through the house: Lisa has discovered Sergei dead in his room. Shortly after, a new family steamer is christened in Nikolai’s name, marked by a grand celebration. Later that evening, Vassa is visited by Rachel Moiseyevna Topaz, her revolutionary daughter-in-law from Switzerland, who demands custody of her son Nikolai. Vassa adamantly refuses, threatening to involve the police.

As tensions escalate, Prokhor hosts a wild evening that descends into debauchery, angering Vassa upon her return. She insists Natalia travel to Switzerland with her trusted servant Anna Vasilyevna Onoschenkova to support Fyodor in his final days, but Natalia refuses and is met with her mother’s anger. When Rachel accuses Vassa of belonging to a dying, corrupt class unfit to raise Nikolai, Vassa retreats to her office, deeply exhausted. There, Anna recounts the chaos that ensues whenever Vassa is absent, prompting her to decide Prokhor’s exile to a tar distillery. Vassa also instructs Anna to report Rachel’s presence to the authorities. The next morning, Anna finds Vassa lifeless in her chair. Following Vassa’s death, Prokhor attempts to seize control of the estate but is thwarted when Alexei arrives with a will naming Anna as the sisters' guardian. Prokhor's efforts to destroy the will fail, and Rachel, uninterested in the estate, asks only for her son’s location. As Anna assumes Vassa’s seat of authority, Lyudmila collapses in shock, leaving the family legacy in tumult.

== Cast ==
- Inna Churikova as Vassa Zheleznova
- Vadim Medvedev as Husband
- Nikolai Skorobogatov as Brother
- Valentina Telichkina as Servant
- Olga Mashnaya as Daughter
- Yana Poplavskaya as Daughter
- Valentina Yakunina as Daughter-in-law
- Vyacheslav Bogachyov as Son
- Ivan Panfilov as Grandson (as Vanya Panfilov)
- Albert Filozov as Melnikov

== See also ==
- List of submissions to the 56th Academy Awards for Best Foreign Language Film
- List of Soviet submissions for the Academy Award for Best Foreign Language Film
