= Assia and the Hen with the Golden Eggs =

1994 film

- Directed by: Andrei Konchalovsky
- Written by: Andrei Konchalovsky; Viktor Merezhko
- Produced by: Sergei Bayev
- Starring: Inna Churikova
- Cinematography: Yevgeni Guslinsky
- Edited by: Yelena Gagarina
- Music by: Boris Bazurov
- Release date: May 1994
- Running time: 117 minutes
- Country: Russia
- Language: Russian

Asya and the Hen with the Golden Eggs, or Ryaba, My Chicken (Russian: Курочка Ряба, translit. Kurochka Ryaba) is a 1994 Russian comedy film directed by Andrei Konchalovsky. It was entered into the 1994 Cannes Film Festival.

Asya and the Hen with the Golden Eggs is a satirical sequel to Konchalovsky's 1966 Soviet film, The Story of Asya Klyachina, taking the characters of the original and placing them in a post-Soviet context.

== Cast ==
- Inna Churikova as Asya
- Viktor Mikhaylov as Vasili Nikitich
- Aleksandr Surin as Stepan
- Gennady Yegorychev as Chirkunov
- Gennady Nazarov as Seryozha
- Mikhail Kislov as Grishka
- Mikhail Kononov as father Nikodim
- Lyubov Sokolova as Maria
- Aleksandr Chislov as secretary
- Andrei Konchalovsky as customer in a hairdressing salon (uncredited)
