= The Assassin of the Tsar =

- Russian poster
- Directed by: Karen Shakhnazarov
- Written by: Aleksandr Borodyansky; Karen Shakhnazarov
- Starring: Oleg Yankovsky; Malcolm McDowell; Armen Dzhigarkhanyan
- Cinematography: Nikolay Nemolyaev
- Music by: John Altman
- Production company: Mosfilm (USSR)
- Release date: 1991 (1993 in UK)
- Running time: 98 minutes
- Countries: Soviet Union, United Kingdom
- Language: Russian (English)
- Budget: £3.37 million

The Assassin of the Tsar (Russian: Цареубийца, romanized: Tsareubiytsa) is a 1991 Soviet historical drama film, starring Malcolm McDowell and Oleg Yankovsky. It was entered into the 1991 Cannes Film Festival. There are two versions. One is filmed in English which later was dubbed over the Russian actors, and one in Russian. Malcolm McDowell pretended to speak Russian in the other version and was later dubbed.

== Plot ==
Timofeyev (Malcolm McDowell) is a patient in an asylum during the 1980s who claims to have killed Tsar Alexander II in 1881 and Tsar Nicholas II, Alexander's grandson, in 1918. One day, Doctor Smirnov (Oleg Yankovsky) notices a strange blue stripe around Timofvev's neck. He learns from his superior, Doctor Alexander Yegorovich (Armen Dzhigarkhanyan), that the blue stripe appears once a year and always on the day one of Alexander II's assassins was killed. Yegorovich also tells him that every August, Timofeyev experiences symptoms of an ulcer, just like Yakov Yurovsky, one of the men who killed Nicolas II. During a session with Smirnov, Timofeyev falls into his Yurovsky persona, complaining about his daughter's arrest and his immense stomach pains.

Smirnov suggests to Yegorovich that someone should pretend to be the tsar, believing that if Timofeyev sees that the "tsar" is still alive, it might break the delusion. Yegorovich vetos the idea, but Smirnov decides to go through with it. During another session, when Timofevev, as Yurovsky, narrates his reaction to the death of Alexander II, Smirnov pretends he is Nicholas II. That night, a scar appears on Smirnov's head, bleeding despite the lack of an open wound, then disappears. When Smirnov describes the experience to Yegorovich, Yegorovich points out that Nicholas II had also suffered a minor wound to the head and tries to persuade Smirnov to cease his investigation, saying there are some things humanity simply can never understand. In a later session, Timofeyev asks the "tsar" about his life. An extended scene shows the Russian Imperial Family's first day of house arrest at the Ipatiev House in Yekaterinburg, with Yurovsky played by McDowell and Nicholas II by Yankovsky. Yegorovich runs into Smirnov while getting eggs and again asks him to leave Timofeyev alone, but he insists he must learn why Yurovsky killed him.

Timofeyev and Smirnov relive the day the Romanovs were executed, each man asking the other questions about what happened and why. During breakfast, Yurovsky gives the family eggs sent by a convent. Leonid Sednev is sent away during dinner; Timofeyev does not recall where. At night, Yurovsky rouses the Romanovs from their slumber and asks them to go the basement, claiming the house may soon be attacked. They gloomily follow him to a bare room. After readying his executioners and gathering the Romanovs in a line, Yurovsky, with some hesitation, reads their death sentence to them. He and his men quickly execute the Romanovs, with Yurovsky personally finishing off Alexei. Timofeyev narrates how his group disposed of the bodies. First, they stripped the corpses naked, then threw them into a mine. The next day, seeing the mine was not deep enough, they pulled the bodies up and tried to put them in another mine, only to get stuck. Frustrated, they dug a common grave, splashed the bodies with acid, smashed them with the butts of their rifles, and drove across them.

Smirnov dies. The film ends with Timofeyev still in the asylum, calmly making goods in the workshop.

== Cast ==
- Oleg Yankovsky — Dr.Smirnov / Tsar Nicholas II
- Malcolm McDowell — Timofeyev / Yakov Yurovsky
- Armen Dzhigarkhanyan — Alexander Yegorovich, Smirnov's superior
- Olga Antonova — Empress Alexandra
- Dariya Majorova — Olga Nikolaevna
- Evgeniya Kryukova — Tatiana Nikolaevna
- Alyona Teremizova — Maria Nikolaevna
- Olga Borisova — Anastasia Nikolaevna
- Aleksei Logunov — Alexei Nikolaevich
- Yury Belyayev — Alexander II of Russia
- Anastasiya Nemolyaeva — nurse
- Anzhelika Ptashuk — Marina, Smirnov's mate

== See also ==
- List of films about the Romanovs
