= Olga Drozdova =

Russian theater and film actress and director (born 1965)

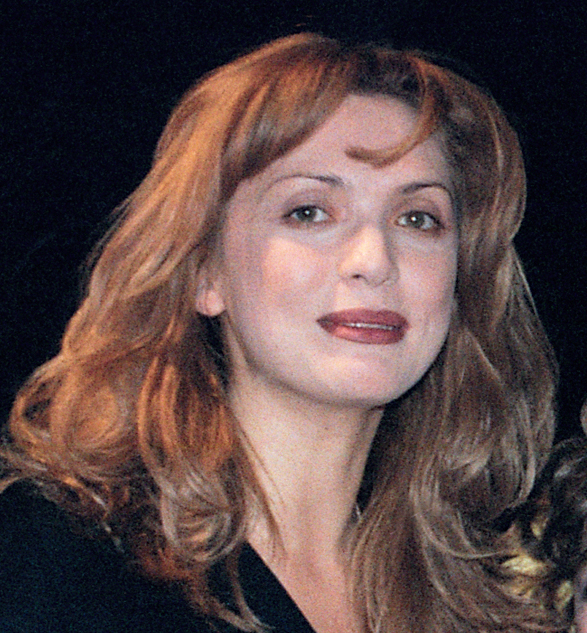

Olga Borisovna Drozdova (Russian: Ольга Борисовна Дроздова; born 1 April 1965, Nakhodka) is a Russian theater and film actress, director. People's Artist of the Russian Federation (2015).

== Selected filmography ==
- Queen Margot (1996) as Charlotte de Sauve
- Bandit Petersburg (2000) as Katya
- Popsa (2005) as crazy singer
- The First Circle (2006) as Dotnara, Volodin’s Wife
- Furious (2017) as Princess Agrafena, Prince Yuri's wife
