= The First Circle (miniseries) =

- Directed by: Gleb Panfilov
- Starring: Yevgeny Mironov; Dmitry Pevtsov; Inna Churikova; Olga Drozdova
- Country of origin: Russia
- No. of episodes: 10

Production
- Running time: 440 minutes, 44 minutes per episode

Original release
- Network: Telekanal Rossiya
- Release: January 29, 2006

The First Circle (Russian: В круге первом, V kruge pervom) is a 2006 Russian miniseries directed by Gleb Panfilov, with ten 44-minute episodes. It is based on The First Circle, the novel written by Aleksandr Solzhenitsyn based on his experiences in Joseph Stalin's Gulag. The series was first broadcast in the Russia on Telekanal Rossiya on January 29, 2006.

== Plot ==
Based on Aleksandr Solzhenitsyn's autobiographical novel and set during the fearful times of Stalin's mass arrests, the series takes place in a sharashka, a prison-laboratory for secret research where Russia's greatest minds are put to government use. While living conditions in this "first circle of hell" are incomparably superior to the Gulag camps, the scientists there face the moral dilemma of cooperating with an inhuman system. The action begins when a Ministry of Foreign Affairs official makes an anonymous phone call to the American embassy, trying to warn them about a leak of information that would allow the USSR to build the atomic bomb. In order to identify the traitor, the KGB turns to one of the projects at the sharashka. The character of Gleb Nerzhin (Yevgeny Mironov), a mathematician who chooses the horrors of the Gulag rather than compromise his conscience, is based on Solzhenitsyn himself. The First Circle is a hard but optimistic story about the victory of the human spirit over totalitarianism.

== Cast ==
- Yevgeny Mironov – Gleb Nerzhin
- Dmitry Pevtsov – Innokenty Volodin
- Olga Drozdova – Volodin's wife
- Igor Sklyar – Illarion Gerasimovich
- Inna Churikova – Gerasimovich's wife
- Albert Filozov – Uncle Avenir
- Kseniya Kachalina – Potapov's wife
- Galina Tunina – Nadya Nerzhina
- Roman Madyanov – Abakumov
- Igor Kvasha – Joseph Stalin
- Alexander Solzhenitsyn – narrator's voice
- Yevgeni Grishkovetz – Galakhov, writer
- Vladimir Konkin – Professor Verenev
- Nina Shatskaya – Nina
- Maxim Shchyogolev – torturer, episode
- Boris Romanov – professor Chelnov
- Yevgeny Stychkin – Pryanchikov
