= Valery Rubinchik =

Russian film director

- Born: Valery Davidovich Rubinchik; 17 April 1940; Minsk, Stalingrad Oblast, Byelorussian Soviet Socialist Republic, USSR
- Died: 2 March 2011 (aged 70); Moscow, Russia
- Occupations: film director, screenwriter
- Years active: 1965 — 2011
- Spouse: Valentina Shendrikova

Valery Davidovich Rubinchik (Russian: Вале́рий Дави́дович Руби́нчик, Belarusian: Валерый Давідавіч Рубінчык; 17 April 1940, Minsk — 2 March 2011, Moscow) was a Soviet, Belarusian and Russian film director and screenwriter.

== Biography ==
His father, David Isaakovich Rubinchik, was a director in the orchestra of Eddie Rosner, then director of the Russian Theater in Minsk; his mother, Maria Abramovna, worked as an engineer. Since childhood, he knew the theater and theatrical life, Valery deliberately chose the profession of director.

He graduated three courses at the Belarusian State Academy of Arts in Minsk (1962). He entered the directing faculty of VGIK.

Starting in 1969 he was the director at the studio Belarusfilm. After the first films made, the right to film The Last Summer of Childhood was obtained almost by accident after the untimely death of the director Nikolay Kalinin. He was artistic director of the film studio.

Since 1990 he worked at Mosfilm.

He taught at VGIK, the Institute of Contemporary Art in Moscow, at the Higher Directing Courses, at the All-Russian Institute of Retraining and Advanced Training of Cinematography Workers. Among the students are Dilya Kurbanova, Aleksei Sidorov, Vadim Sokolovsky, Sergey Saradzhev, Anna Melikyan, Natalya Penkova, actors Kseniya Kachalina, Dmitry Roshchin, Elena Korikova.

== Personal life ==
He was married to actress Valentina Shendrikova (Cordelia at King Lear). Daughter Marianna (born in 1974).

== Death ==
He died in 2011 and is buried at Vostryakovskoe Cemetery.

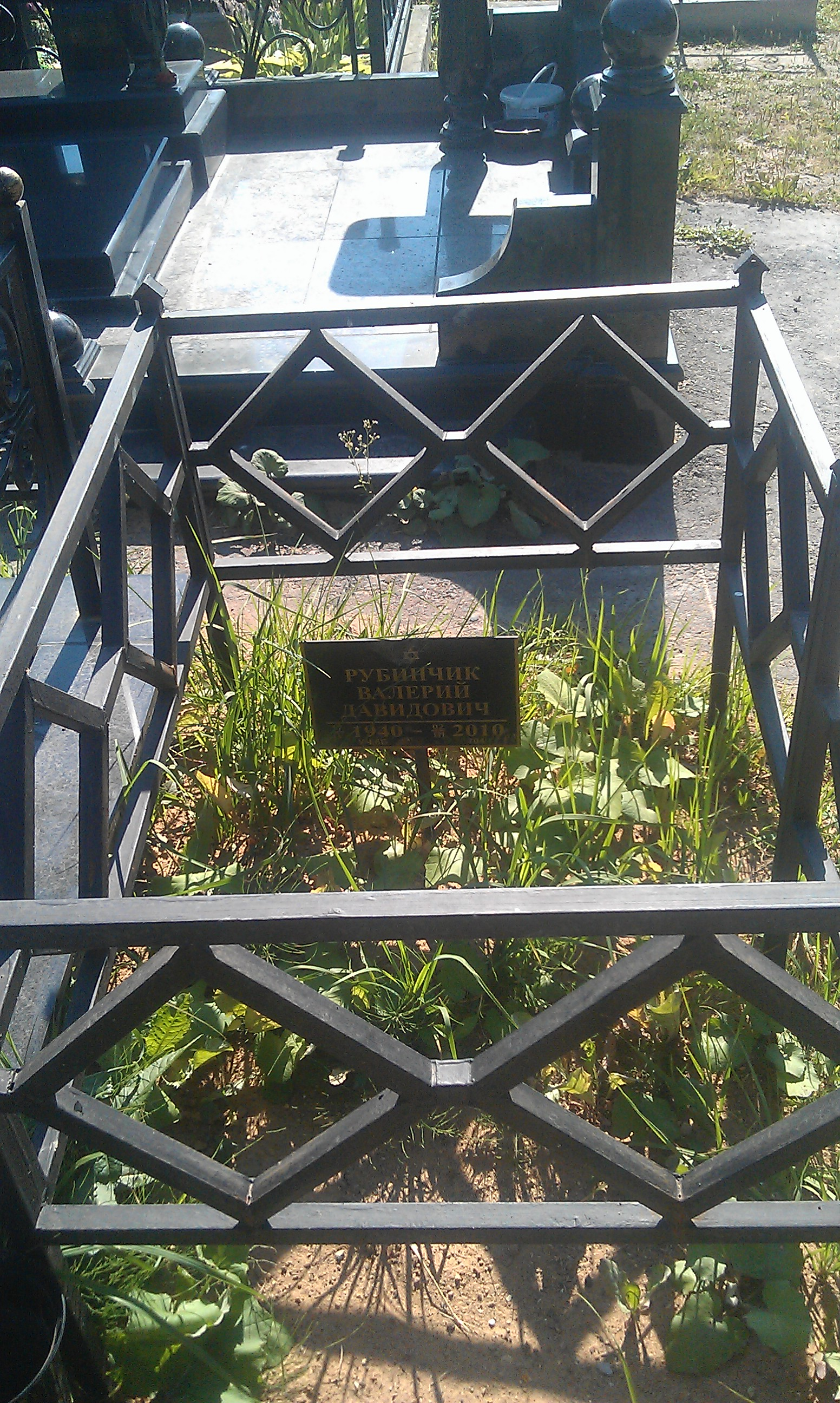
Rubinchik's tomb

== Rubinchik on Rubinchik ==
I'm sorry about many things. First of all, I had long pauses between the films. I explain this by choosing a topic, a script for too long. I regret that I did not take a film about my post-war childhood, my beloved Minsk. What little worked in the theater. Sometimes I regret that I did not become an actor. In VGIK, I was known as a capable actor and therefore I was invited to all graduate performances of the acting faculty, to all the skits.

== Awards ==
- Honored Artist of the Russian Federation (1998)
- Wild Hunt of King Stach (1980):
  - Brussels International Fantastic Film Festival — Golden Raven
  - Montréal World Film Festival — Jury Prize
  - Mystfest — Best Film
- Nanjing Landscape (2006):
  - Moscow International Film Festival — Russian Film Clubs Federation Award
