= Gleb Panfilov =

Russian film director (1934–2023)

- Глеб Панфилов
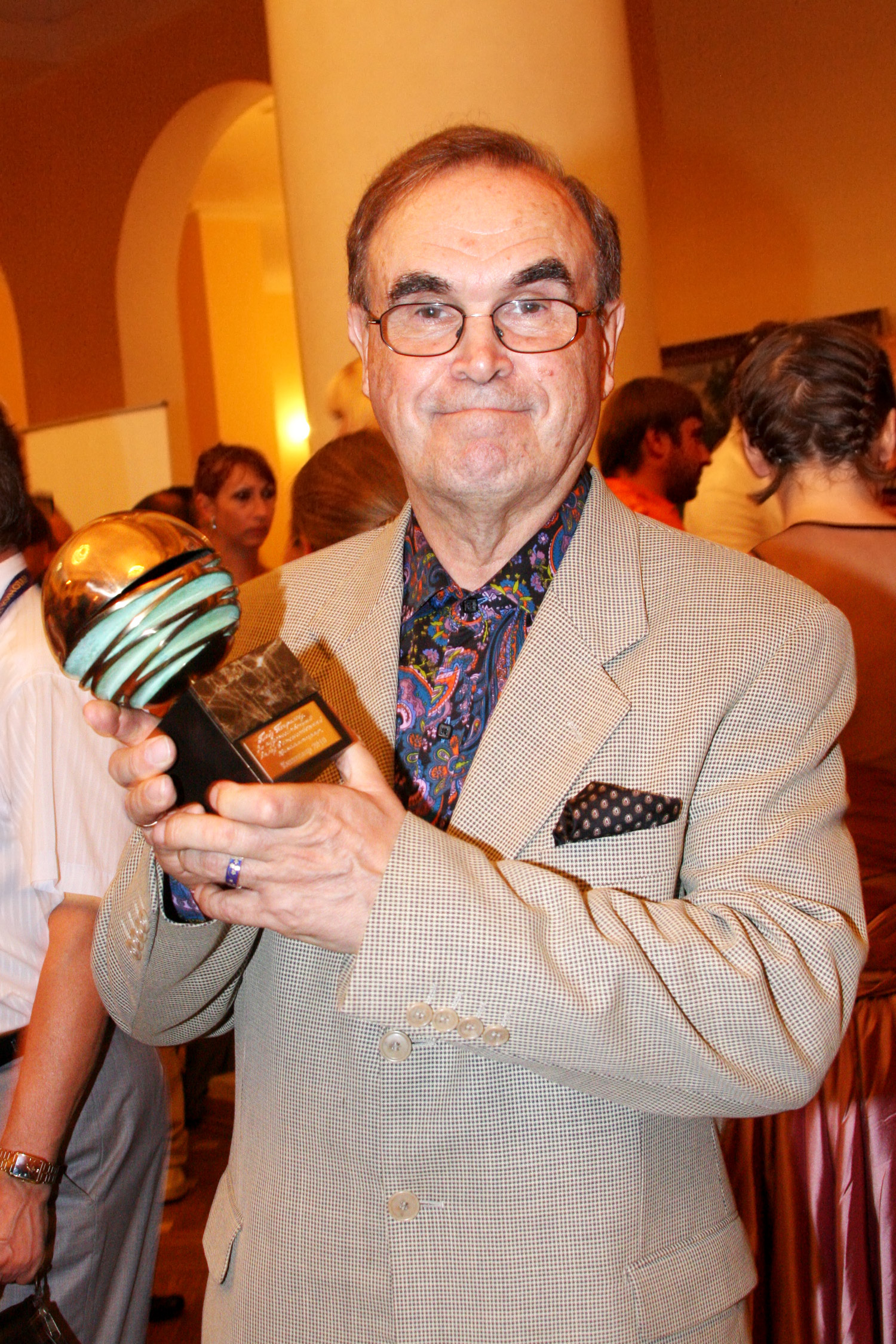
- Panfilov at the Kinotavr film festival in 2010
- Born: 21 May 1934; Magnitogorsk, Chelyabinsk Oblast, Russian SFSR, Soviet Union
- Died: 26 August 2023 (aged 89); Moscow, Russia
- Occupations: Film director; screenwriter
- Years active: 1958–2022

Gleb Anatolyevich Panfilov (Russian: Глеб Анатольевич Панфилов; 21 May 1934 – 26 August 2023) was a Russian film director noted for a string of mostly historical films starring his wife, Inna Churikova.

== Biography ==
In the 1980s Panfilov, a chemist by profession, moved to theatre directing, but also found time to adapt for the screen Alexander Vampilov's play Valentina (1981), as well as Maxim Gorky's Vassa Zheleznova (1983) and Mother (1989). Vassa won the Golden Prize at the 13th Moscow International Film Festival and Russia's State Prize. He won the Golden Bear at the 37th Berlin International Film Festival for the film The Theme.

Despite the hardships of the 1990s Panfilov was committed to directing The Romanovs: An Imperial Family, an epic story of the Romanov sainthood. The film, finally released in 2000, was a sort of family project involving his wife as well as children. It was also his first movie that did not feature his wife in a leading role.

In 2000 at the 22nd Moscow International Film Festival Panfilov was awarded an Honorable Prize for his contribution to cinema.

In January 2006 RTR TV aired Panfilov's miniseries based on Alexander Solzhenitsyn's novel The First Circle. The Nobel Prize-winning author helped adapt the novel for the screen and narrated the film.

Gleb Panfilov died on 26 August 2023, at the age of 89.

== Filmography ==
=== Director ===
- People's Militia (1958)
- Nylon jacket (1958)
- Get in Line with Us (1959)
- Nina Melovizinova (1962) (TV)
- Killed Not in the War (1962) (TV)
- The Case of Kurt Clausewitz (1963) (TV)
- No Path Through Fire (1967)
- The Beginning (1970)
- I Want the Floor (1975)
- The Theme (1979)
- Valentina (1981)
- Vassa (1983)
- Mother (1990)
- The Romanovs: An Imperial Family (2000)
- The First Circle (2006) (TV mini-series)
- Ivan Denisovich (2021)

=== Writer ===
- Killed Not in the War (1962) (TV)
- The Case of Kurt Clausewitz (1963) (TV)
- No Path Through Fire (1967)
- The Beginning (1970)
- I Want the Floor (1975)
- The Lucky Man (1978)
- The Theme (1979)
- Meeting (1980)
- Valentina (1981)
- Vassa (1983)
- Mother (1990)
- The Romanovs: An Imperial Family (2000)
