= Ward No. 6 =

1892 novella by Anton Chekhov

- Short story by Anton Chekhov
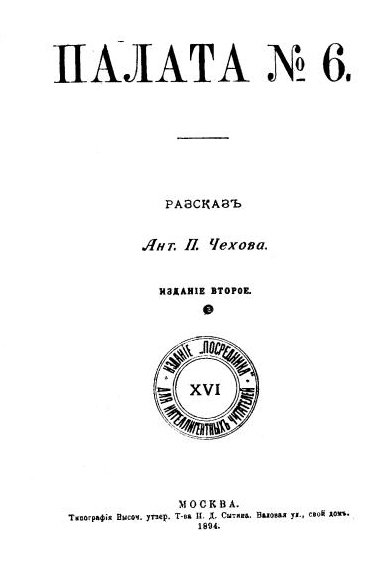
- First Russian edition
- Original title: Палата № 6
- Country: Russia
- Language: Russian

Publication
- Publisher: Russkaya Mysl
- Publication date: 1892

"Ward No. 6" (Russian: Палата № 6, romanized: Palata nomer shestoy) is an 1892 novella by Anton Chekhov.

== Publication ==
The story was first published in the No.11, November 1892 issue of Russkaya Mysl. Divided into chapters and with minor edits it was included into the 1893 collection called Ward No. 6, published in Saint Petersburg. Also in 1893 the novella (its text seriously mangled by censors) appeared in the Posrednik (Intermediary) Publishers's series called For Intelligent Readership. With minor edits Chekhov included it into Volume 6 of his Collected Works published by Adolf Marks in 1899–1901.

== Summary ==
Revolving around philosophical and social conflicts, this story is set in a provincial hospital, specifically in the titular rundown building that houses five male patients suffering from mental illness. It explores the interactions occurring between the narrator—a doctor—and the members of his town. Andrey Yefimitch Ragin is the hospital's chief doctor, and although he holds an esteemed position, he finds himself distressed with the mediocrity surrounding him. His deep desire to be submerged in intellectual conversation is satisfied by one of the patients in Ward No. 6. Ragin seldom visits the ward until he becomes captivated by a paranoid patient who challenges his views on suffering. Ivan Gromov, although in a mental ward, was one of the sane members of the town, an eloquent man capable of engaging in the sort of intellectual conversation that the doctor had long been searching for. Gromov denounces the injustice he sees everywhere, while Dr. Ragin insists on ignoring injustice and other evils; partially as a result of this way of thinking, he neglects to remedy the shoddy conditions of the mental ward.

To the people of the town, it was quite flabbergasting that the doctor was spending an excess amount of time in the mental ward. Consequently, rumors were spread questioning the mental stability of Ragin, and whether or not he was fit to continue being the doctor of the town. Such was the concern of the townspeople, that they created a council to judge Ragin's sanity, and ultimately deemed him insane. Ragin was not made aware of this absurd diagnosis but rather was persuaded by a man, Mihail Averyanitch, to go on vacation because he was not acting like himself lately, and surely a vacation would rid him of his peculiar behavior. Despondency followed Ragin on vacation, and isolated him further from society. Having spent all of his money on vacation and loaning it to Averyanitch, Ragin returned to town and found himself without a job and without a penny to fall on. With nowhere left to turn, Ragin moved in to the residency where the hospital chef lived and found himself spiraling down the rabbit hole.

The epitome of Ragin's destruction was marked when Averyanitch along with the new doctor of the town, Hobotov, visited Ragin in his new living headquarters. Such social displeasure provoked Ragin to spew vile words and even launch a bottle of bromide at the horrified visitors. It was at that moment that all hope was lost for Ragin, and Dr. Hobotov was convinced that Ragin should be admitted to the mental ward. Discreetly, Hobotov lured Ragin into the mental ward under the pretext that there was a patient with a curious lung case. Once both of them were in the ward, Hobotov slipped out, and left Ragin trapped against his will. Now faced with the same future as Gromov's, Ragin understood that suffering was not a creation of the mind that could be whisked away by changing one's mentality. No longer an esteemed doctor, Ragin fought with futile efforts to be released from the ward but was instead faced with the beatings that were customarily given to the other members of the ward. Ragin's enlightenment came at the cost of his destruction; becoming a patient of the asylum triggered an apoplectic stroke in Ragin that ended his life after one day in the ward. What once were five lunatics, became six, and marked Ward No. 6.

== Characters ==
- Dr. Andrey Yefimitch Ragin: the doctor of a small town, had aspirations for a clerical career but was persuaded otherwise by his father. A man of tall stature with a simplistic means of living, who appreciated intelligence and honesty but lacked strength of will and leadership. Ragin possessed a thirst for intellectual conversation that was quenched when he met Ivan Gromov. His frequent visits to the mental ward of the hospital resulted in his involuntary admittance to the ward as a patient himself. Distraught with the turn of his fate and indignation, Ragin had a stroke after a day of incarceration at the mental ward no.6.
- Ivan Dmitritch Gromov: one of the patients of ward no. 6, described to be excited, gentle, agitated, but most notably with a paranoia of persecution. The slightest of noises would cause Gromov to look over his shoulder in fear of the police arresting him for a crime he had not committed. Gromov challenged Ragin's viewpoint on suffering, arguing that in order to understand the suffering of others, the doctor would have to experience suffering himself. He ultimately became the only person that Ragin wished to converse with and even fought alongside him to be released from the ward, with no success.
- Mihail Averyanitch: a postmaster that believed himself to be friends with Ragin, feelings which were not reciprocated by the other party. Was often concerned with the mental state of Ragin and even dragged him along on a vacation in a futile attempt to restore the sanity of the doctor. Eventually, Ragin blew the fuse on Mihail, insulting him with words and even throwing a bottle of bromide at him.
- Yevgeny Fyodoritch Hobotov: the young district doctor that arrived to the town to assist Ragin in the hospital. Formed part of the council that diagnosed Ragin to be mentally unstable and then took over Ragin's post in the hospital. After having witnessed Ragin's outburst provoked by his and Mihail's visit, he lured Ragin into the mental ward under the pretext of visiting a patient with an interesting lung complication.
- Sergey Sergeyitch: was the medical assistant of Ragin yet he had his own practice in the town. Spied on Ragin during one of his conversations with Gromov and found it odd that the doctor was spending an excess amount of time with a mental patient. Aided in the spread of rumors that Ragin should be institutionalized in the ward.
- Nikita: the guard of the ward in charge of maintaining the behavior of the patients, a task which he executed happily with beatings and harsh treatment. Had respect for Ragin and referred to him as "your honour" though he did not release Ragin from the ward upon request, and instead gave him a beating as he often did to the other patients for misbehavior.
- Daryushka: was the chef of the hospital kitchen; would strictly follow Ragin's meal schedules and became alarmed when instead of asking for his usual beer, Ragin was conversing with Gromov. After Ragin was forced to abandon his living quarters in the hospital, Daryushka covered for him when he could not pay the landlady due to loss of employment. She also visited the doctor in the mental ward once he was trapped.
- Moiseika: "the Jew Moiseika" was the only patient of the ward that was allowed to leave. When venturing into the town, he would try and gather any scraps by begging. All of which he brought back from town was confiscated by Nikita. He found pleasure in caring for his companions of the mental ward.
- Semyon Lazaritch: barber of the ward patients, only mentioned once in the story but is noted to mistreat the patients in a similar manner as Nikita.

== Themes ==
=== Existential crisis ===
"Ragin's illumination of truth comes at the moment of death, too late to live in wisdom."

Throughout the story, Ragin struggles with an internal battle of deciding whether or not his life is of any value. In the hospital, he behaves as if his actions as a doctor have no impact on the lives of others, deeming death to be the outcome of any medical situation. He is the doctor of the town and esteemed with honor, yet he does not use his position to make a difference in the conditions of the hospital and the ward. Ragin was a knowledgeable man that let life pass by him, merely repeating each day in a robotic manner. While on vacation with Mihail, Ragin spent his hours laying on the sofa contemplating life and death. Although a life span is the longest thing a person will experience, he felt that once death took place, one simply evaporated and left no trace in the universe. He found no point in living if the life would be forgotten once gone. And so he carried on each day not caring if the world around him was falling apart because for a very long time, the world in him was already lost.

=== Society ===
"A hospital where the sane are locked up for their madness and the cynical serve the state by acquiescing."

In Ward No.6 the asylum consisted of five patients, and then six once the doctor was admitted. Of those six patients, two were sane and locked up against their will. The determination of their sanity was not diagnosed by a doctor rather by society deeming their actions unfit. When Ragin was seen with Gromov more often than not, the town folk began spreading rumors behind his back about his actions instead of asking him why he was speaking to the mental patient. Such actions highlighted the misplaced value of the townspeople, more concerned with the latest gossip than with demonstrating compassion. The town constructed a council with unqualified people to judge the sanity of Ragin without his consent, and once a diagnosis was concluded, it was not communicated to Ragin. Furthering the crisis existing in the town created by Chekhov, it was socially acceptable for the patients of the ward to be punished with physical beatings. While Ragin was still in charge of the hospital, he made no efforts to put a stop to the abuse of the mental patients, and as a result he received the same treatment when he became a patient of the ward. Misplaced values were also observed in the hospital, where robbery was common and integrity was not. Had the town focused its energy on punishing the thieves instead of the mental patients, then perhaps their health care system would have been comparable to that of a larger city.

=== Neglect ===
"A physician could leave no human mark on human misery & nonetheless persisted in treating the sick, sowing corn and planting trees."

The hospital and ward that the story revolved around were both in dilapidated condition. Maintenance of sanitation was nonexistent, thus probably why the majority of the patients in the hospital would be admitted but not released. The hospital was swarming with thieves composed of employees and patients that would rob food, medicine, and any readily available supply. All of the problems existing in the hospital were not unknown to Dr. Ragin but he felt no use in improving medical conditions because at the end of the day, death was inevitable so why prolong a life that had an expiration date. Even though a young Ragin had aspirations for a clerical career, he did not demonstrate the compassion of a priest when dealing with his patients, neglecting to perform surgery.

=== Suffering ===
"To cultivate indifference to suffering is to aim at a living death for to feel is to live."

A vast dialogue occurred between Ragin and Gromov, exploring the fruiting of suffering and its relationship to love. As much as Ragin wanted to help and relieve the suffering of Gromov, the latter said it would be impossible for the doctor to do so because he had never felt suffering. Gromov argued that in order for one to be compassionate with the suffering of others, it was necessary to experience suffering first hand. Not only was suffering necessary for compassion, but it enabled a being to appreciate love and life, a message that Ragin did not understand until he became a member of the ward. As a doctor, Ragin argued that it did not matter if he was inside the ward like Gromov or outside, nor did the clothes and food that they ate matter, because suffering was mental and one could make it disappear upon request. Those words were easily said at the point in the story which he could leave the ward upon desire, but once his freedom was removed, he understood the suffering experienced by Gromov. Their shared suffering united them in an attempt to escape from the ward, a futile attempt, but for the first time, doctor and patient were on the same level.

== Reaction ==
Literary critic William Lyon Phelps reacted positively to the story, writing:

In Ward No. 6, which no one should read late at night, Chekhov has given us a picture of an insane asylum, which, if the conditions there depicted are true to life, would indicate that some parts of Russia have not advanced one step since Gogol wrote Revizor... The fear of death, which to an intensely intellectual people like the Russians, is an obsession of terror, and shadows all their literature,—it appears all through Tolstoi's diary and novels,—is analysed in many forms by Chekhov. In Ward No. 6 Chekhov pays his respects to Tolstoi's creed of self-denial, through the lips of the doctor's favourite madman.

Literary critic Edmund Wilson called it one of Chekhov's "masterpieces, a fable of the whole situation of the frustrated intellectuals of the Russia of the eighties and nineties".

Communist politician and political theorist Vladimir Lenin believed that his reading of Ward No. Six "made him a revolutionary". Upon finishing the story, he is said to have remarked: "I absolutely had the feeling that I was shut up in Ward 6 myself!"

== Adaptations ==
The novella has been adapted to film several times, including the 1978 Yugoslav production Ward Six, a 2004 Russian-Austrian co-production named Ragin and a 2009 film with the same name as the original story.* Television adaptations of the piece include the BRD production "Krankensaal 6" from 3. Dezember 1974 by Karl Fruchtmann which featured Helmut Qualtinger as Dr. Ragin., as well as the 1987 version from Poland called Sala nr 6, by Krzysztof Gruber starring Jerzy Bińczycki. Additionally, a Swiss feature film adaptation of the piece named "Ward Six" and starring Peter Seaton-Clark was shot in English in autumn 2025. "Ward No. 6" is also an episode from the 1986 Indian anthology series Katha Sagar.

=== List of adaptations ===
- 1959 — Ward No. Six (TV) (Canada), directed by Harvey Hart (Folio)
- 1963 — Ward Number Six (TV) (United Kingdom), directed by Ian MacNaughton (Teletales)
- 1968 — Paviljon broj VI (TV) (Yugoslavia), directed by Joakim Marušić
- 1968 — If Only the Trains Come (TV) (United Kingdom), directed by Barry Davis
- 1973 — La sala número 6 (TV) (Spain)
- 1974 — Krankensaal 6 (West Germany), directed by Karl Fruchtmann
- 1978 — Ward Six (Yugoslavia), directed by Lucian Pintilie
- 1987 — Sala nr 6 (TV) (Poland), directed by Krzysztof Gruber, screenplay by Andrzej Domalik
- 2004 — Ragin (Russia), directed by Kirill Serebrennikov, screenplay by Mikhail Ugarov and Dmitry Zverkov
- 2009 — Ward No. 6 (Russia), directed by Karen Shakhnazarov, screenplay by Alexander Borodyansky and Karen Shakhnazarov
- 2025 — Ward No. 6 (Russia), directed and written by Eduard Zholnin.

== Cultural influence ==
The play was mentioned in Andrei Tarkovsky's Mirror (1975 film).
