= Winter Evening in Gagra =

- Directed by: Karen Shakhnazarov
- Written by: Alexander Borodyansky; Karen Shakhnazarov
- Produced by: Vladimir Klimenko
- Starring: Yevgeniy Yevstigneyev; Aleksandr Pankratov-Chyornyy; Natalya Gundareva; Sergei Nikonenko
- Cinematography: Vladimir Shevtsik
- Edited by: Lydia Milioti
- Music by: Anatoly Kroll
- Production company: Mosfilm
- Release date: 25 December 1985 (Soviet Union)
- Running time: 90 minutes
- Country: Soviet Union
- Language: Russian

Winter Evening in Gagra (Russian: Зимний вечер в Гаграх, romanized: Zimniy vecher v Gagrakh) is a 1985 musical comedy-drama film directed by Karen Shakhnazarov.

== Plot ==
Rapid rhythm and playful virtuoso improvisation - that's what tap dance is. The protagonist of the film who once was a famous tap dancer, an idol of the public, lives today modestly and discreetly. He is a dance tutor for pop groups where the other stars shine.

And suddenly everything changes: the old artist suddenly remembers his youth. A somewhat strange encounter with a young man who comes with a broken leg affects him; the man asks to be taught the tap dance beat. A man with a gimp leg named Arkady Grachev approaches Aleksey one day pleading with him to teach him how to tap dance. Arkady pays Aleksey five rubles and schedules an appointment to learn how to dance. The lesson goes terribly wrong and Aleksey refuses to teach Arkady how to dance. Then drama arises when Aleksey is on the set of a production and he sees the very famous singer Irina Melnikova speak harshly to a set employee. Aleksey stands up for the employee then consequently he is fired from his job. Feeling depressed Aleksey sits in the hallway of the studio as Arkady arrives to receive another lesson. After hearing the news of Aleksey getting fired Arkady is determined to make things right for the former star. So he seeks out Irina Melnikova to get Aleksey his job back. Arkady is successful in doing this but Aleksey does not thank him on the other hand he calls him a monkey. This puts strain on Arkady and Alekseys relationship, but despite this strain Arkady still helps Aleksey out throughout the film. The film then takes a turn when a television show wrongfully reports that Aleksey is dead. This really freaks out Aleksey but to his surprise no one calls to find out if he is ok so he goes to the studio with Arkady to fix the mistake. Aleksey suddenly has a heart attack. While on his deathbed he explains that he would give anything to have one more winter evening in Gagra.

The film ends with Arkady tap dancing alone in the studio without his tutor, but in his memory, eventually getting it right.

== Cast ==
- Yevgeniy Yevstigneyev as Aleksey Ivanovich Beglov
- Aleksandr Pankratov-Chyorny as Arkady Grachev
- Natalya Gundareva as Irina Melnikova, singer
- Sergei Nikonenko as Valentin Fomenko, choreographer
- Pyotr Shcherbakov as Alexander Alexandrovich, administrator
- Georgy Burkov as Fyodor, bartender
- Aleksandr Shirvindt as presenter
- Mikhail Derzhavin (episode)

== Creation history ==
According to the testimony of Karen Shakhnazarov, Winter Evening in Gagra became a kind of continuation of his previous film We Are from Jazz. A tap-tutor for the cast was Aleksey Bystrov, who died during the filming. He was the prototype of the main character of the Winter Evening in Gagra, Beglov. In his youth, Bystrov worked in Alexandrov Ensemble, in 1949 he became a laureate of the Second International Ballet Competition in Budapest.
