= Sixth Ward =

Sixth Ward may refer to:

== Places ==
- 6th Ward of New Orleans, a ward of New Orleans
- Sixth Ward, Houston, a neighborhood of Houston
- 6th ward, Chicago, an aldermanic ward of Chicago
- Ward 6, St. Louis City, an aldermanic ward of St. Louis
- Ward 6, one of the neighborhoods of Washington, D.C.
- Ward 6, the name of several wards of Zimbabwe
- Stittsville Ward, Ottawa (also known as Ward 6)

== Other uses ==
- "Ward No. 6", a short story by Anton Chekhov

- Ward Six, a 1978 Yugoslav adaptation of the Chekhov story
