= List of Russian submissions for the Academy Award for Best International Feature Film =

Best International Feature Film submissions from Russia

Highlights
- Debut: 1992
- Submissions: 29
- Nominations: 7
- Oscar winners: 1

Russia has submitted films for the American Academy Award for Best International Feature Film (Note: The category was previously named the Academy Award for Best Foreign Language Film, but this was changed to the Academy Award for Best International Feature Film in April 2019, after the Academy deemed the word "Foreign" to be outdated.) since 1992. Prior to that, Russian SFSR-produced films formed the vast majority of motion pictures submitted by the former Soviet Union. The Foreign Language Film award is handed out annually by the U.S.-based Academy of Motion Picture Arts and Sciences to a feature-length motion picture produced outside the United States that contains primarily non-English dialogue. Each year, the Academy invites countries to submit their best films for competition, with only one film being accepted from each country.

Before 1992, most of the films submitted by the Soviet Union were Russian. Eight of them were nominated, including three winners: War and Peace (1967), Dersu Uzala (1975), and Moscow Does Not Believe in Tears (1980).

As of 2026, Russia has been nominated seven times, and won once for Burnt by the Sun (1994). Its last submission was in 2021.

== Submissions ==
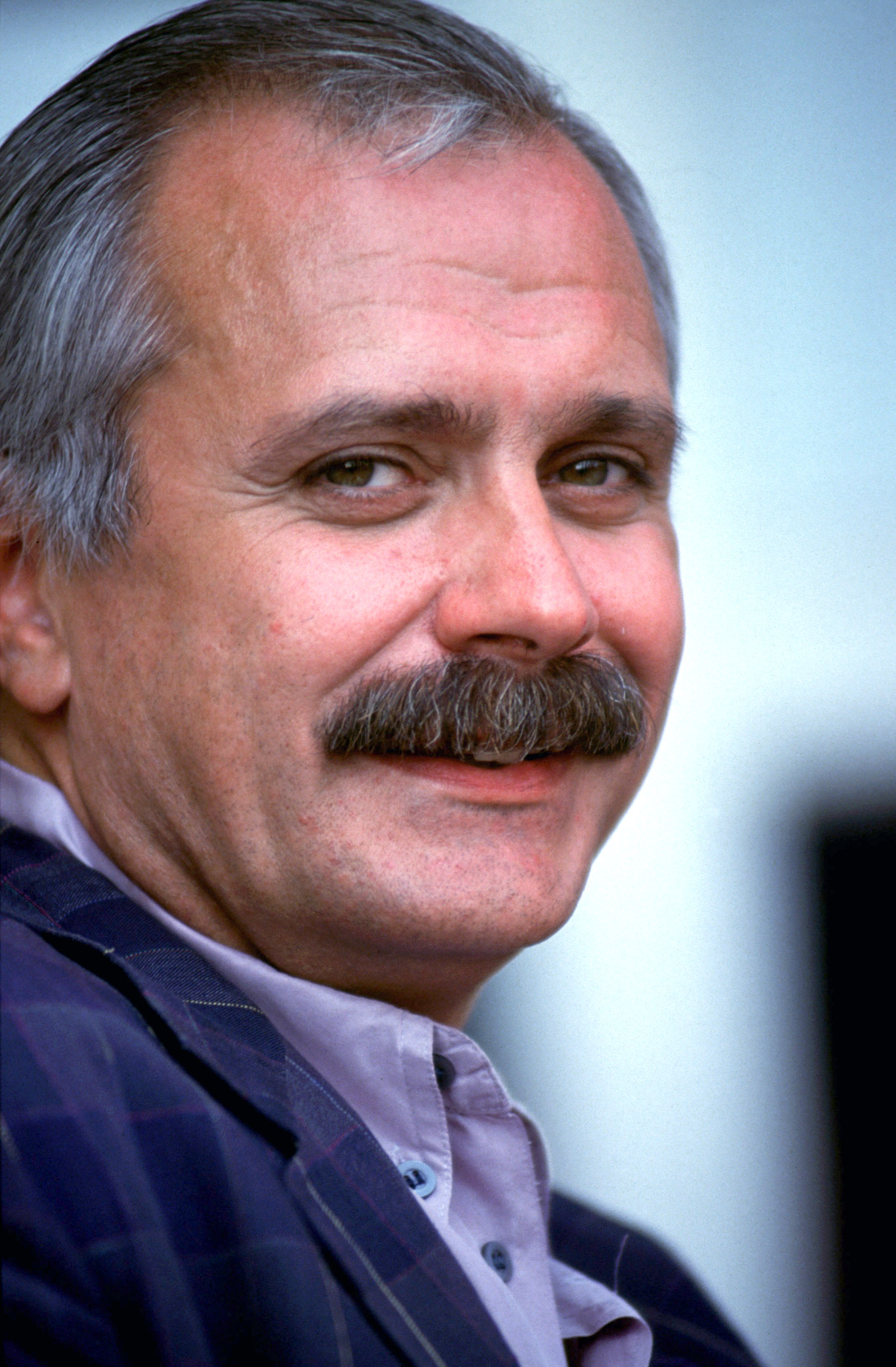
Nikita Mikhalkov was the first post-Soviet Russian director to win the award, for Burnt by the Sun.

The Academy of Motion Picture Arts and Sciences has invited the film industries of various countries to submit their best film for the Academy Award for Best International Feature Film since 1956. The International Feature Film Committee oversees the process and reviews all the submitted films. Following this, they vote via secret ballot to determine the five nominees for the award.

Nikita Mikhalkov has been chosen to represent the country five times. Although The Barber of Siberia (1998) was disqualified when the print did not arrive in Los Angeles in time, three other films were nominated. While Burnt by the Sun (1994) was the country first win in the category.

Among the nominated films are: Close to Eden (1992), Prisoner of the Mountains (1996), The Thief (1997), 12 (2007), Leviathan (2014), and Loveless (2017).

Paradise (2016), Beanpole (2019), and Dear Comrades! (2020), advanced to the December shortlists, but were not nominated.

In 2022, the Russian Committee, headed by Pavel Chukhray, confirmed its intention to submit a film. However, days later, the Russian Film Academy announced they would not submit an entry for that year ceremony. Chukhray resigned in protest and said he was not consulted about the decision. Nikita Mikhalkov, alluding to the United States' reaction to the 2022 Russian invasion of Ukraine, had previously said, "The way I see it, choosing a film that will represent Russia in a country that, in fact, now denies the existence of Russia, is simply pointless". Since then, Russia has not submitted any new entry.

Following the Russo-Ukrainian war, many filmmakers flew to exile, including Andrey Zvyagintsev, Kantemir Balagov, and Kira Kovalenko (all previous submitted filmmakers), among others. Zvyagintsev went to direct Minotaur (2026), about the country current political landscape, and the film was submitted as the French official entry to the category.

All the films submitted are primary in Russian. Below is a list of the films that have been submitted by Russia for review by the Academy since 1992.

Year (Ceremony)	Film title used in nomination	Original title	Director(s)	Result
1992 (65th)	Close to Eden	Урга	Nikita Mikhalkov	Nominated
1994 (67th)	Burnt by the Sun	Утомлённые солнцем	Nikita Mikhalkov	Won Academy Award
1995 (68th)	A Moslem	Мусульманин	Vladimir Khotinenko	Not nominated
1996 (69th)	Prisoner of the Mountains	Кавказский пленник	Sergei Bodrov	Nominated
1997 (70th)	The Thief	Вор	Pavel Chukhray	Nominated
1998 (71st)	The Barber of Siberia	Сибирский цирюльник	Nikita Mikhalkov	Disqualified
1999 (72nd)	Moloch	Молох	Alexander Sokurov	Not nominated
2000 (73rd)	His Wife's Diary	Дневник его жены	Alexei Uchitel	Not nominated
2001 (74th)	The Romanovs: An Imperial Family	Романовы - Венценосная семья	Gleb Panfilov	Not nominated
2002 (75th)	House of Fools	Дом дураков	Andrei Konchalovsky	Not nominated
2003 (76th)	The Return	Возвращение	Andrey Zvyagintsev	Not nominated
2004 (77th)	Night Watch	Ночной дозор	Timur Bekmambetov	Not nominated
2005 (78th)	The Italian	Итальянец	Andrei Kravchuk	Not nominated
2006 (79th)	9th Company	9 рота	Fyodor Bondarchuk	Not nominated
2007 (80th)	12		Nikita Mikhalkov	Nominated
2008 (81st)	Mermaid	Русалка	Anna Melikian	Not nominated
2009 (82nd)	Ward No. 6	Палата №6	Aleksandr Gornovsky and Karen Shakhnazarov	Not nominated
2010 (83rd)	The Edge	Край	Alexei Uchitel	Not nominated
2011 (84th)	Burnt by the Sun 3: The Citadel	Утомлённые солнцем 2: Цитадель	Nikita Mikhalkov	Not nominated
2012 (85th)	White Tiger	Белый тигр	Karen Shakhnazarov	Not nominated
2013 (86th)	Stalingrad	Сталинград	Fyodor Bondarchuk	Not nominated
2014 (87th)	Leviathan	Левиафан	Andrey Zvyagintsev	Nominated
2015 (88th)	Sunstroke	Солнечный удар	Nikita Mikhalkov	Not nominated
2016 (89th)	Paradise	Рай	Andrei Konchalovsky	Made shortlist
2017 (90th)	Loveless	Нелюбовь	Andrey Zvyagintsev	Nominated
2018 (91st)	Sobibor	Собибор	Konstantin Khabensky	Not nominated
2019 (92nd)	Beanpole	Дылда	Kantemir Balagov	Made shortlist
2020 (93rd)	Dear Comrades!	Дорогие товарищи!	Andrei Konchalovsky	Made shortlist
2021 (94th)	Unclenching the Fists	Разжимая кулаки	Kira Kovalenko	Not nominated

== See also ==
- List of Academy Award winners and nominees for Best International Feature Film
- List of Soviet submissions for the Academy Award for Best International Feature Film
- List of Russian Academy Award winners and nominees
- Cinema of Russia
- Cinema of the Soviet Union
