= The Rider Named Death =

Russian historical film

- Russian: Всадник по Имени Смерть
- Directed by: Karen Shakhnazarov
- Written by: Alexander Borodyansky; Karen Shakhnazarov
- Based on: The Pale Horse by Boris Savinkov
- Produced by: Karen Shakhnazarov
- Starring: Andrei Panin; Kseniya Rappoport
- Music by: Anatoly Kroll
- Production company: Mosfilm
- Release date: 2004
- Running time: 106 minutes
- Country: Russia
- Language: Russian
- Box office: $1.3 million

The Rider Named Death (Russian: Всадник по Имени Смерть) is a 2004 historical drama directed by Karen Shakhnazarov. The second adaptation of Boris Savinkov's novel The Pale Horse, the film depicts the assassination of a high-ranking imperial official during the chaotic times following Russia's defeat in the Russo-Japanese War in 1905.

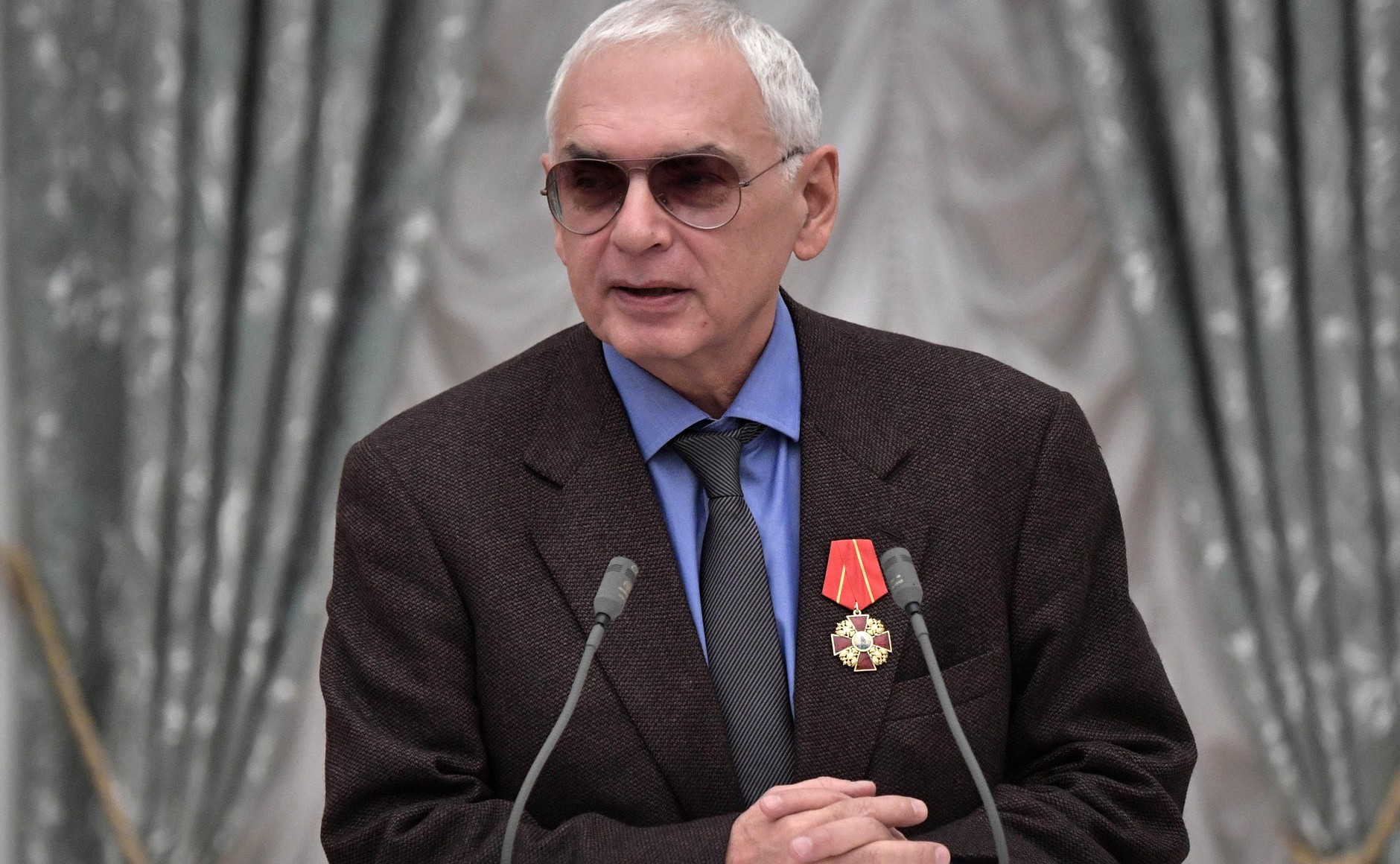
Director Karen Shakhnazarov

== Plot ==
In the opening scene, a beautiful, young woman requests an audience with the local minister to personally plead to bring food to her imprisoned brother. When admitted to his office, she pulls a gun from her purse and shoots him to death. The assassin is apprehended and confesses to belonging to the Socialist Revolutionary Party.

George is the leader of an underground terrorist cell of the same political party. His recruits include Vanya, a principled student; Fyodor, a bitter anarchist; and Erna, a skilled bomb maker. Their target is the Grand Duke Aleksandrovich. Vanya and Fyodor die during different failed attempts to throw a bomb in the Grand Duke's passing carriage. Between attempts, the plotters discuss their motives and question each other's dedication to murdering the Grand Duke.

After the deaths of Vanya and Fyodor, a party contact tells George he should relocate and find a new target. George insists that he can kill the Grand Duke himself. At the staging of an opera, George sneaks up to the royal balcony and shoots the Grand Duke in the chest. The next morning, a newspaper is delivered to his hotel room and confirms the Grand Duke is dead.

== Cast ==
- Andrei Panin as George
- Kseniya Rappoport as Erna
- Artyom Semakin as Vanya
- Rostislav Bershauer as Fyodor
- Anastasiya Makeyeva as Elena
- Alexei Kazakov as Heinrich

== Historical Context ==
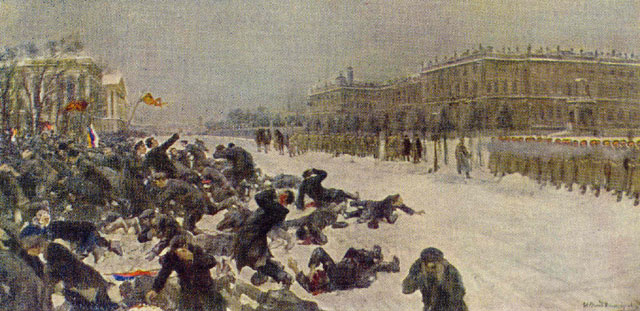
Artistic impression of Bloody Sunday, a pivotal event in the Russian Revolution of 1905

Years of economic unrest (labor strikes increased five fold from 1895 to 1905) and political stagnation (a parliamentary body was not formed until 1906) culminated in the Russian Revolution of 1905 and a military defeat against the Japanese. An increase in political violence corresponded with a dramatic rise in lethal repression. Political parties that thrived in this atmosphere included the Bolshevik party, the Menshevik party, and the Socialist Revolutionary party, the most extreme in its use of violence. George, the main character of the film, is based on Boris Savinkov, a member of the paramilitary wing of the Socialist Revolutionary party. His notable works include the autobiography, Memoirs of a Terrorist, and semi-autobiographical The Pale Horse.

== Reception ==
=== Critical Response ===
The Rider Named Death has an approval rating of 73% on review aggregator website Rotten Tomatoes, based on 15 reviews. Metacritic assigned the film a weighted average score of 48 out of 100, based on 10 critics, indicating "mixed or average reviews".

Dana Stevens of The New York Times wrote, "If you like your antiheroes tall, pale and existential, you won't do better than Georges, the anti-czarist assassin at the heart of Karen Shakhnazarov's historical drama." The production design, commended by many critics, encompassed "an exquisitely recreated Moscow of nearly a century ago." The timing of the release concerned her as she concluded, "To make a film in 2005 that asks audiences to sympathize with the plight of a band of terrorists is an intellectually audacious gesture."

Variety also took appreciative note of the sets. "Gorgeous set design by Ludmila Kusakova stacks the deck even before the plot kicks in: It would be criminal to destroy such stunning works of art as the raspberry-colored palace of the Grand Duke or blow up a masterful layout where even beggars figure as essential parts of the decor." The main character's motive for murder detracted from the film's quality. "A chilly assassin, voluptuously obsessed with his victim’s demise, Panin’s George seems more dedicated to death than to justice.Tech credits are top drawer."

Ty Burr of the Boston Globe gave a more mixed review. "Shakhnazarov's film effortlessly captures the times and the author's conflicted yet unyielding attitude, yet it never draws any conclusions -- the film remains under glass. It's watchable, nevertheless."
