= White Tiger (2012 film) =

2012 film

- Russian DVD cover
- Directed by: Karen Shakhnazarov
- Screenplay by: Aleksandr Borodyansky; Karen Shakhnazarov
- Based on: Tankist, ili "Byeli tigr" by Ilya Boyashov
- Produced by: Galina Shadur; Karen Shakhnazarov
- Starring: Gerasim Arkhipov
- Cinematography: Aleksandr Kuznetsov
- Edited by: Irina Kozhemyakina
- Music by: Yuri Poteyenko; Konstantin Shevelyov
- Production companies: Mosfilm; Channel One Russia
- Distributed by: Karoprokat
- Release date: 3 May 2012
- Running time: 104 minutes
- Country: Russia
- Languages: Russian; German

White Tiger (Russian: Белый тигр, translit. Belyy tigr) is a 2012 Russian war film, directed by Karen Shakhnazarov and co-written with Aleksandr Borodyansky based on the novel The Tankman, or The White Tiger (Russian: Танкист, или “Белый тигр”, Tankist, ili "Belyy tigr") by Russian novelist Ilya Boyashov. The film is about a badly wounded Soviet tank commander on the Eastern Front of World War II who becomes obsessed with tracking down and destroying a mysterious, invincible German tank, which the Soviet troops call the "White Tiger". The Soviets design a new, more powerful T-34 tank and assign the tank commander the job of destroying the White Tiger.

The film was selected as the Russian entry for the Best Foreign Language Oscar at the 85th Academy Awards.

== Plot ==
In the aftermath of a tank battle in the summer of 1943, a Soviet tank driver is recovered from the battlefield and recovers from burns over 90% of his body with no scarring. He has retrograde amnesia: he does not know who he is, but retains all his skills. He is given the name Ivan Naydenov (from the Russian word найденный, "found") and returned to duty. Naydenov believes he can communicate with tanks as if they were people.

Rumors arise about a new, invincible Nazi tank that materializes, wreaks destruction and disappears back into the forest: a Tiger I painted completely in white which is dubbed "White Tiger" by both Soviet and German forces. The rumor sparks Naydenov's memory of being injured by this tank. Reports of White Tiger circulate after another tank battle, though the Soviet officers believe the Tiger had to sink into an impenetrable swamp bordering the forest. Naydenov insists it is somewhere in the forest.

The Soviets build a prototype of an upgraded T-34/85 with stronger armor, a more powerful engine, stabilized gun for accurate firing on the move and a crew of just three. Naydenov is selected as commander and driver; Kryuk as gunner; and Berdyev as loader. Naydenov, ordered to destroy the White Tiger, conceals his tank in the forest, lures the White Tiger into an ambush with another T-34 as bait. When the White Tiger appears, the other T-34 is destroyed and Naydenov's tank is hit from behind at close range before the German retreats back into the forest. Naydenov's crew is puzzled, thinking the Tiger could easily have finished them.

Naydenov believes "The Tank God" wants him to destroy the White Tiger and gives him the ability to understand tanks and survive battles. When shells are fired at him he believes his tank warns him of the incoming danger. Naydenov is convinced the enemy tank is unmanned, a ghost of the war. Counterintelligence Major Fedotov comes to believe Naydenov and assists him. A captured German officer reveals the legend of an undead tank is generating fear rather than hope in the German Army.

A large Soviet tank force is completely wiped out by the White Tiger, firing faster and more accurately than a human crew could. Naydenov chases the White Tiger in his tank into an abandoned village where he destroys a Panzer IV concealed in a barn then engages the White Tiger. Kryuk disables its turret, but their gun barrel gets jammed with mud and misfires before Kryuk can finish off the White Tiger, which retreats.

Fedotov attempts to convince his commanding general that the White Tiger and the "born-again" Naydenov are creations not of man, but of the war itself. The general is unconvinced and sends him on a ten-day leave.

After the Battle of Berlin and the unconditional surrender of Nazi Germany, Fedotov tells Naydenov the war is over and to go home. Naydenov replies the war will not truly end until the White Tiger, which is healing from its wounds and waiting to strike again, is finally destroyed. Fedotov returns to his vehicle and turns to see, Naydenov and his tank have vanished.

The film ends with Hitler sitting in a large room with a fireplace, talking to a shadowy stranger and defending his actions during the war. He predicts Germany will be seen as monsters, and believes the Holocaust and his attack on Russia were a realization of what all of Europe silently wanted but couldn't admit. He concludes war has no beginning or end and that it is the original human state.

== Cast ==
- Aleksey Vertkov as Ivan Naydenov
- Vitali Kishchenko as Major Fedotov
- Gerasim Arkhipov as Captain Sharipov
- Aleksandr Bakhov as Kryuk
- Vitaliy Dordzhiev as Berdyev
- Dmitriy Bykovskiy-Romashov as General Smirnov
- Valeriy Grishko as Marshal of the Soviet Union Georgy Zhukov
- Vilmar Biri as Generaladmiral Hans-Georg von Friedeburg
- Klaus Grünberg as Generaloberst Hans-Jürgen Stumpff
- Vladimir Ilin as Chief of the Hospital
- Dmitriy Kalyazin as young sailor
- Karl Krantskovski as Adolf Hitler
- Andrey Myasnikov as General
- Leonid Orlov as German POW
- Christian Redl as Generalfeldmarschall Wilhelm Keitel
- Maykl Shenks
- Mariya Shashlova as Voennvrach

== Production ==
The film was shot in the summer of 2011, with German actors playing the Nazi officers and military equipment prepared at the Mosfilm military technical base.

== See also ==
- List of submissions to the 85th Academy Awards for Best Foreign Language Film
- List of Russian submissions for the Academy Award for Best Foreign Language Film
