= Igor Sklyar =

Russian actor

- Игорь Скляр
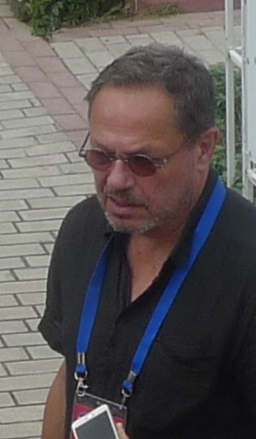
- Sklyar in 2020
- Born: 18 December 1957 (age 68); Kursk, Soviet Union (now Russia)
- Occupation: Actor
- Years active: 1974-present

Igor Borisovich Sklyar (Russian: Игорь Борисович Скляр; born 18 December 1957) is a Russian actor and singer. He has appeared in over 30 films since 1974. He starred in the 1994 film, The Year of the Dog, which won the Silver Bear for an outstanding artistic contribution at the 44th Berlin International Film Festival.

== Biography ==
Sklyar was born on 18 December 1957 in Kursk in a family of engineers. He studied at a music school and dreamed of becoming a musician.

In 1975, after graduation, Igor applied to several creative universities in Moscow, but was not accepted. He entered the Leningrad Institute of Theater, Music and Cinematography, the course of Lev Dodin. After graduating from the university in 1979, Igor Sklyar became an actor of the Tomsk Youth Theater, where he worked until 1980.

In 1980-1982 he served in the cavalry regiment at the Mosfilm, while acting in the cinema.

From 1983 until 2000 Igor Sklyar was an actor of the Leningrad Maly Drama Theater under the direction of Lev Dodin. His roles included the village fool in Brothers and Sisters by Fedor Abramov, convict Fedka in The Devils by Fyodor Dostoyevsky, Jack Simon in Lord of the Flies by William Golding, the murderer Roberto Zukko in the play of the same name.

Since 2006, he worked in the entertaining theater of Nikita Sokolov "NIKART", in the same year he would be accepted into the troupe of the Theater Festival "Baltic House". On the stage of the "Baltic House" Igor Sklyar performed the role of Sasha in the play Bury Me Behind the Baseboard. In 2011, on the same stage, the actor played one of the main roles in the production of The Cabal of Hypocrites.

Since 2015, Igor Sklyar has been cooperating with the Moscow Sovremennik Theater. In the 2017 season he played the role of Cyril Zander in the play With the Coming ....

In film, Igor Sklyar made his debut as a schoolboy Nikolai Maslenka, in Vladimir Rogovoy's film Shipboy of the Northern Fleet (1973), but recognition came to the young artist in 1984 with the release of Karen Shakhnazarov's musical film We Are from Jazz, in which Sklyar performed the role of jazz musician Kostya Ivanov.

Having performed "Komarovo", one of the first hits of Igor Nikolayev, Igor Sklyar gained wide popularity. Having become famous as a pop singer, the actor ironically played this situation in the role of a pop star from Alexander Stefanovich's film Start First (1986).

In Alexander Surikov's comedy Children of Monday (1998), the actor played an atypical image of a drunk businessman Mitya. In 2000, Igor Sklyar acted as Commissioner Yakovlev in the film Gleb Panfilov's The Romanovs: An Imperial Family.

Igor Sklyar starred in the films: Townspeople (1976), Only in the Music Hall (1980), Take Care of Women (1981), Anna Pavlova (1983), Hourglass (1984), Battalions Ask for Fire (1985), Maritsa (1985), The Feat of Odessa (1985), Start First (1986), The Victims Have No Claims (1986), The Journey of Monsieur Perrychon (1987), The Frenchman (1988), The Prisoner of Château d'If (1989), The Imitator (1990), Tartuffe (1992), The Year of the Dog (1994), The Investigators: Ten Years After (2002), Red Sky, Black Snow (2002), Ratatouille (2006), Hooked on the Game (2009), Robinson (2010), Courier from Paradise (2013), Dreams (2013), Hammer (2016), About the Faith (2016).

In recent years Sklyar has been actively playing in TV series - Moscow Saga (2004), The Chess Player (2004), The Fall of the Empire (2005), The First Circle (2006), The Summer of the Wolves (2011) (2011), Underground Transition (2012), Sherlock Holmes (2013), Farmer (2013), Outgoing Nature (2013), Teach me to live (2016), Family Album (2016), Excellence (2017).

== Honors ==
People's Artist of Russia (2013), winner of the Best Actor's Debut Prize at the Mosfilm Festival "Youth" (1984, "We are from Jazz"), laureate of the Best Actor Award at the Open Russian Film Festival Kinotavr in Sochi (1994).

== Personal life ==
Igor Sklyar is married to Honored Artist of the Russian Federation Natalia Akimova. They have a son, Vasily, born in 1991.

== Selected filmography ==
=== Film ===
- Sea Cadet of Northern Fleet (Юнга Северного флота, 1973)
- Anna Pavlova (Анна, Павлова, 1983) as Serge Lifar
- We Are from Jazz (Мы из джаза, 1984) as Konstantin Ivanov
- The Prisoner of Château d'If (Узник замка Иф, 1988) as Benedetto
- The Year of the Dog (Год собаки, 1994) as Sergej
- The Romanovs: An Imperial Family (Романовы. Венценосная семья, 2000) as Vasily Yakovlev
- Hooked on the Game (На игре, 2009) as Sergey Zaritsyn

=== Television ===
- Moscow Saga (Московская сага, 2004) as Mikhail Frunze
- The First Circle (В круге первом, 2006) as Illarion Gerasimovich
- The Fall of the Empire (Гибель империи, 2005) as Ricks
- A Second Before... ( Секунда до..., 2007) as Lera's husband
- Sherlock Holmes (Шерлок Холмс, 2013) as Thaddeus Sholto
