= 33rd Karlovy Vary International Film Festival =

Film festival edition

- Location: Karlovy Vary, Czech Republic
- Founded: 1946
- Awards: Crystal Globe: Streetheart by Charles Binamé
- No. of films: 213
- Festival date: July 3–11, 1998
- Website: www.kviff.com/en/homepage

Karlovy Vary International Film Festival chronology
- 34th 32nd

The 33rd Karlovy Vary International Film Festival took place from July 3 to 11, 1998, in Karlovy Vary, Czech Republic.

A total of 213 films were presented at the festival. The Crystal Globe was awarded to Canadian film Streetheart, directed by Charles Binamé.

== Juries ==
Grand Jury

- Gila Almagor, actress, Jury President
- Véra Belmont, French film producer
- Irakli Kvirikadze, Georgian screenwriter
- Jiří Menzel, Czech film director
- Gianni Rondolino, Italian film critic
- Jerzy Skolimowski, Polish film director
- Jerzy Stuhr, Polish actor
- Maria Zvereva, Russian screenwriter

== Official selection ==
=== In competition ===
English title	Original title	Director(s)	Production countrie(s)
Animals		Michael Di Jiacomo	United States
Comedian Harmonists		Joseph Vilsmaier	Germany, Austria
Dahan		Rituparno Ghosh	India
Day of the Full Moon	День полнолуния	Karen Shakhnazarov	Russia
Falling Into the Evening	落下する夕方	Naoe Gozu	Japan
The Governess		Sandra Goldbacher	United Kingdom
Killer		Darezhan Omirbaev	France, Kazakhstan
Notes of Love	La parola amore esiste	Mimmo Calopresti	Italy, France
Rivers of Babylon		Vlado Balco	Slovakia, Czech Republic, France
Secret Defense	Secret défense	Jacques Rivette	France, Switzerland, Italy
Sekal Has to Die	Je třeba zabít Sekala	Vladimír Michálek	Czech Republic
Streetheart †	Le coeur au poing	Charles Binamé	Canada
The Sugar Factory		Robert Carter	Australia
Tic Tac		Daniel Alfredson	Sweden
Two Moons, Three Suns	Две луны три Солнца	Roman Balayan	Ukraine, Russia
Wicked		Michael Steinberg	United States
Winter		Danniel Danniel	Netherlands

Highlighted title and dagger (†) indicates Crystal Globe winner.

=== Another View ===
English title	Original title	Director(s)	Production countrie(s)
Bent Familia		Nouri Bouzid	Tunisia
Blue Moon	藍月	Ko I-chen	Taiwan
Dance of the Wind		Rajan Khosa	India
East Palace, West Palace	东宫西宫	Zhang Yuan	China
First Love, Last Rites		Jesse Peretz	United States
Fun Bar Karaoke	ฝันบ้าคาราโอเกะ	Pen-ek Ratanaruang	Thailand
Ghosts of Tangier	Fantômes de Tanger	Edgardo Cozarinsky	France, Morocco, Germany
Green Fish	초록 물고기	Lee Chang-dong	South Korea
Insomnia		Erik Skjoldbjærg	Norway
Made in Hong Kong	香港製造	Fruit Chan	Hong Kong
Motel Cactus	모텔 선인장	Park Ki-yong	South Korea
Postman Blues	ポストマン・ブルース	Sabu	Japan
Rosenzweig's Freedom	Rosenzweigs Freiheit	Liliane Targownik	Germany
Silvester Countdown		Oskar Roehler	Germany
The Small Town	Kasaba	Nuri Bilge Ceylan	Turkey
Solo tu		Arnaud Dommerc, Anne Benhaïem	France
The Stowaway	De Verstekeling	Ben van Lieshout	Netherlands
Sunset at Chaophraya	คู่กรรม	Euthana Mukdasanit	Thailand
Tamas and Juli	Tamás és Juli	Ildikó Enyedi	Hungary, France
To Die for Tano	Tano da morire	Roberta Torre	Italy
Welcome Back, Mr. McDonald	ラヂオの時間	Kōki Mitani	Japan
Who the Hell Is Juliette?	¿Quién diablos es Juliette?	Carlos Marcovich	Mexico

== Awards ==
The following awards were presented at the festival:

- Crystal Globe: Streetheart by Charles Binamé
- Special Jury Prize: Day of the Full Moon by Karen Shakhnazarov
- Best Director Award: Charles Binamé for Streetheart
- Best Actress Award: Julia Stiles for Wicked
- Best Actor Award: Olaf Lubaszenko for Sekal Has to Die
