= Ward No. 6 (film) =

- Russian: Палата № 6
- Directed by: Aleksandr Gornovsky; Karen Shakhnazarov
- Written by: Aleksandr Borodyansky; Anton Chekhov; Karen Shakhnazarov
- Produced by: Galina Shadur; Karen Shakhnazarov
- Starring: Vladimir Ilyin; Aleksey Vertkov; Aleksandr Pankratov-Chyorny; Yevgeny Stychkin; Viktor Solovyov
- Cinematography: Aleksandr Kuznetsov
- Edited by: Irina Kozhemyakina
- Music by: Evgeny Kadimsky
- Release date: 2009
- Country: Russia
- Language: Russian

Ward No. 6 (Russian: Палата № 6) is a 2009 Russian drama film directed by Aleksandr Gornovsky and Karen Shakhnazarov.

The film was selected as the Russian entry for the Best Foreign Language Film at the 82nd Academy Awards, but it was not nominated. It is an adaptation of a Chekov novella of the same name.

== Plot ==
The film tells about the doctor of the provincial psychiatric hospital Ragin, who meets a patient with his own philosophy, as a result of communication with which he himself becomes crazy.

== Cast ==
- Vladimir Ilyin as Ragin
- Aleksey Vertkov as Gromov
- Aleksandr Pankratov-Chyorny as Mikhail Averyanovich
- Yevgeny Stychkin as Khobotov
- Viktor Solovyov as Nikita
- Aleksey Zharkov as Old chief physician
- Albina Evtushevskaya as Darya
- Anna Sinyakina
- Alina Olshanskaya
- Stanislav Eventov

== Reception ==
=== Critical response ===
Ward No.6 has an approval rating of 67% on review aggregator website Rotten Tomatoes, based on 6 reviews, and an average rating of 6.00/10.

== See also ==
- List of submissions to the 82nd Academy Awards for Best Foreign Language Film
- List of Russian submissions for the Academy Award for Best Foreign Language Film
