= I'm Going to Search =

- Russian: Иду искать
- Directed by: Igor Dobrolyubov
- Written by: Anatoliy Agranovsky; Mikhail Ancharov
- Starring: Georgiy Zhzhonov; Lev Durov; Pyotr Shcherbakov; Aleksandr Grechanyy; Vladimir Yemelyanov
- Cinematography: Igor Remishevsky; Yuri Tsvetkov
- Edited by: M. Dobrennikovoy
- Music by: Romuald Grinblat
- Production company: Belarusfilm
- Release date: 1966
- Running time: 89 min.
- Country: Soviet Union
- Language: Russian

I'm Going to Search (Russian: Иду искать, romanized: Idu iskat) is a 1966 Soviet drama film directed by Igor Dobrolyubov.

== Plot ==
The film tells about the life of the scientist Andrei Gusarov against the backdrop of the difficult thirties for him, as well as the Great Patriotic War and the first launch of an artificial Earth satellite.

== Cast ==
- Georgiy Zhzhonov as Andrey Gusarov
- Lev Durov as Aleksey Ivanov
- Pyotr Shcherbakov as Pavel Bakanov
- Aleksandr Grechanyy as Sergey Shirokov
- Vladimir Yemelyanov as Colonel Itsenko
- Lev Zolotukhin as Kuchumov
- Lev Ivanov as Nikolay Bogomolov
- Irina Brazgovka as Valya
- Igor Komarov as Svyatoslav Novoseltsev
- Vladimir Marenkov as Semyon Petrovich
- Lidiya Malyukova as Lyudmila Georgiyevna
- Boris Novikov as Glotov
- Daniil Netrebin as Cinematographer
- Yevelina Ovchinnikova as Klavochka
- Yevgeny Teterin as Kirill Golovin
- Mikhail Fyodorovskiy as Designer
- Stanislav Fesyunov as Flyer
- Oleg Khromenkov as Flyer
- Vladimir Nosik as Tourist in the Kremlin (uncredited)
