= Nina Dorda =

Soviet singer (1924–2016)

Nina Dorda Нина Ильинична Дорда HAR

Background information
- Born: Nina Ilyinichna Dorda; 27 August 1924; Moscow, Russia
- Died: 26 February 2016 (aged 91) Moscow, Russia
- Genres: pop, soprano
- Occupation: Singer
- Instrument: Vocals

Nina Ilyinichna Dorda (Russian: Ни́на Ильи́нична До́рда; 27 August 1924 – 26 February 2016) was a Soviet pop and soprano singer, an Honored Artist of Russia.

== Biography ==
Dorda was born in Moscow, Russia in 1924. She was interested in music at a young age and in 1937, began to attend the Central Music School at the Moscow Conservatory. In 1946, Dorda became a soloist-vocalist with the Union Concert Tours Association (VGKO).

From 1954 to 1959, Dorda performed in a jazz orchestra with Eddie Rosner. The group gained prominence due to its extensive and colorful tour program.

Dorda married musician Maykl Lipski. They met at a restaurant where she was playing in an orchestra. In 1960, Dorda created a new orchestra with him, where, for two decades, she served as a soloist for the group. At the same time, she performed as a soloist for the Moscow Music Hall and performed tours throughout North and South America and Japan (1969-1970).

According to the post-Soviet criticism, Dorda was a genre singer and embodied the charming image of a modern girl in her manner of speech. Her songs were perceived as sincere, fervent, sly, and sad. Her tunes quickly caught on with the public and her pleasant tone of voice, soft and intimate manner of execution, and sparkling mischief made audiences from around the world fall in love with her. These qualities evoked flattering reviews of the singer in the official Soviet press.

Dorda stopped performing in 1980, but her work is still very popular and a number of her songs have been remade by other singers.

In 1995, Dorda was awarded the title of Honored Artist of Russia in recognition of her creativity and personality.

Dorda was the basis of the singer Vera Gorda, the heroine of the novel Moscow Saga by Soviet writer Vasily Aksyonov. In 2004, this novel was adapted into a TV series, where the role of Gorda was played by Kristina Orbakaite.

== Death ==
Dorda died in Moscow, Russia on 26 February 2016 at the age of 91.

== Repertoire ==
Dorda's repertoire included:

- It Was Spring (Kreuder — Koval)
- The Starry Night (Yakushenko — Registan)
- Spring Song (Ostrovsky — Fadeev)
- Spring In The Park (Feltsman — Fink)
- Where Is The Love Here (Eshpay — Registan)
- For You Lovers (Molchanov — Registan)
- Goodbye, Friends (Ostrovsky — Oshanin)
- Goodnight, Muscovites (Mescherin — Feret)
- Waiting For Love (Khrennikov — Shatunovskii)
- Hello, Dear City (Kazhlaev — Aliyev])
- Lily Of The Valley (Feltsman — Fadeev)
- Lunar Path (Ostrovsky — Registan)
- May Morning (Lyudvikovsky — Dragoon)
- My Bob (Feltsman — Hodos)
- My Dear (Ostrovsky — Zeitlin)
- Over Moscow River And The Vistula (Lepin — Matusovskiy)
- Our Street (Tsfasman — Dragoon, Davidovich)
- We Do Not Meet (Ostrovsky — Kashezheva)
- Strange Words (Mineiro — Lipski)
- Well, Smile (Lvov-Kompaneets — Guryanov)
- Well, What Do You Say About Sakhalin (Frenkel — Tanich)
- First Ice (Feltsman — Voznesensky)
- The Song Remains A Man (Ostrovsky — Ostrovoy)
- Trains (Feltsman — Matusovskiy)
- Last Nomads (Feltsman — Olev)
- Toy Saleswoman (Ptichkin — Fadeev)
- Forgive (Babajanyan — Registan)
- Blue Twilight (Bromberg — Aleshkovsky)
- Old Maple (Pakhmutova — Matusovskiy)
- Saturday Evening (Tulikov — Kharitonov)
- You Tell Me, Tell Me A River (Zatsepin — Krivoschёkov)
- Pilots Fly Away (Fedin — Shamov)
- Walks Song In A Circle (Feltsman — Tanich, Shaferan)
- Lamb (Agababov — Gairbekov)
- Clear Night (Mescherin — Feret)
