= Volunteers (1958 film) =

1958 film by Yuri Yegorov

- DVD cover
- Directed by: Yuri Egorov
- Written by: Yuri Egorov; Yevgeniy Dolmatovsky
- Produced by: Vladimir Maron
- Starring: Mikhail Ulyanov; Pyotr Shcherbakov; Leonid Bykov
- Cinematography: Igor Shatrov
- Edited by: Ksenia Blinova
- Music by: Mark Fradkin
- Production company: Gorky Film Studio
- Release date: 20 October 1958
- Running time: 97 min.
- Country: USSR
- Language: Russian

Volunteers (Russian: Добровольцы, romanized: Dobrovoltsy) is a Soviet feature film released in 1958. It is based on the poetic novel of the same name by Yevgeniy Dolmatovsky.

== Premise ==
The film takes place during the 1930s to 1950s. Three inseparable male friends—Kaitanov, Ufimtsev, and Akishin—voluntarily became the first builders of the Moscow Metro. The film also tells the story of the friendship between three women: Olya, Masha, and Tanya. The main themes of the movie include the labor front, Spanish volunteer brigades, World War II, and postwar labor in peacetime. The film shows a variety of emotions: joy and sorrow, victory and loss, love and happiness.

== Plot ==
In 1935 Moscow, recruitment begins for volunteers to build the first line of the Moscow Metro. Three young men—Nikolay Kaitanov, Slava Ufimtsev, and Lyosha Akishin—meet during a medical examination. Akishin is initially rejected due to poor health but is allowed to join the project thanks to the intervention of an old Bolshevik, Uncle Seryozha. The trio joins Lyolya Teplova's team and quickly becomes standout workers. A romance blossoms between Kaitanov and Lyolya, who spend their weekends strolling in Sokolniki Park. Meanwhile, Ufimtsev dreams of becoming a pilot and dedicates his free time to training at an aeroclub. Akishin secretly harbors feelings for Lyolya, suffering in silence.

A mining accident occurs, injuring Kaitanov and Ufimtsev, and sending them to the hospital. The incident causes Ufimtsev to miss a parachute training session, during which his beloved Masha dies. Time passes, and Kaitanov becomes a team leader at the mine, marries Lyolya, and has a son. However, he is falsely accused of sabotage by the mine's leadership, who blame him for the previous accident and the mysterious disappearances of Ufimtsev and Max, a German anti-fascist. Meanwhile, it is revealed that Ufimtsev and Max are fighting in the Spanish Civil War with the International Brigades. Ufimtsev is wounded in combat, parachutes to safety, and is rescued by Max. Back in Moscow, Kaitanov's case is discussed at a Komsomol meeting. Lyolya, receiving a letter from Ufimtsev through a returning comrade, rushes to the meeting and clears Kaitanov's name with the support of the workers.

Ufimtsev returns from Spain and later joins Kaitanov in battles against the Japanese at Khalkhin Gol. Kaitanov is awarded the Order of the Red Star, while Ufimtsev is named a Hero of the Soviet Union. As World War II begins, Kaitanov is sent to the front, and Ufimtsev is assigned to train pilots in the rear, despite his pleas to join combat. Amid German air raids on Moscow, Lyolya shelters with her son and a young woman, Tanya, who confesses her love for Ufimtsev. Later in the war, Kaitanov and Ufimtsev reunite at the front, reminiscing about Akishin, who sacrifices himself aboard a sunken submarine. After the war, Ufimtsev finds Tanya, who has waited for him throughout the conflict. Years later, at a birthday celebration for Kaitanov's son, the next generation's dedication to rebuilding and progress shines. Meanwhile, Kaitanov reflects on Akishin's love for Lyolya through a letter recovered from the submarine, and Ufimtsev secretly resumes his passion for aviation. The story concludes with a new couple walking in the same place where Kaitanov and Lyolya once strolled, symbolizing the continuity of hope and love.

== Cast ==
- Mikhail Ulyanov as Nikolai Kaitanov
- Pyotr Shcherbakov as Vyacheslav Ufimtsev
- Leonid Bykov as Aleksei Akishin
- Elina Bystritskaya as Olga Teplova, Kaitanov's wife
- Lyudmila Krylova as Masha Suvorova, pilot-paratrooper
- Mikaela Drozdovskaya as Tanya, Ufimtsev's wife
- Maria Vinogradova as Sergeant Valya Kukhnarenko
- Lyudmila Ivanova as Komsomol's member
- Lyudmila Marchenko as Kaitanov Jr.'s girlfriend
- Svetlana Kharitonova as military regulator
- Nonna Mordyukova as subway builder

== Awards ==
- All-Union Film Festival – Third Prize
