= Day of the Full Moon =

- Directed by: Karen Shakhnazarov
- Written by: Alexander Borodyansky; Karen Shakhnazarov
- Produced by: Vladimir Dostal; Galina Shadur
- Starring: Anna Germ; Andrei Panin; Elena Koreneva; Natalya Fateyeva; Vladimir Ilyin
- Cinematography: Gennady Karyuk
- Music by: Anatoly Kroll
- Production companies: Mosfilm Studio; Courier Studio
- Release date: 1998
- Running time: 93 minutes
- Country: Russia

Day of the Full Moon (Russian: День полнолуния, romanized: Den polnoluniya) is a 1998 parable drama film directed by Karen Shakhnazarov. It premiered on television on November 2, 1998, on TNT.

== Plot ==
The film unfolds as a series of episodes from the lives of different people across various eras. It lacks a singular protagonist or a cohesive narrative thread. Instead, the movie is structured like a kaleidoscope of scenes where reality intertwines with romantic memories. The harsh, almost naturalistic visuals transform into a poetic journey through time and space.

Set at the end of the 20th century, the film presents a collection of seemingly unrelated individuals reenacting life scenarios. Unbeknownst to them, their actions ripple through time, affecting strangers' lives.

The film features "new Russians" caught in yet another violent conflict, a popular DJ hosting a late-night broadcast, an elderly Uzbek man explaining to his grandson where Genghis Khan is buried, a successful hitman, Princess Olshanskaya, a mysterious monk named Taisiy, an international diplomat, and even Alexander Pushkin himself, who meets a beautiful Kalmyk woman on his journey to Erzurum.

== Cast ==
- Anna Germ as Woman in Purple
- Andrei Panin as Captain
- Elena Koreneva as Zoya
- Vladimir Ilyin as Rebrov
- Valery Priyomykhov as Screenwriter
- Valery Storozhik as Oleg Nikolayevich, Director
- Valery Afanasyev as Yegor, Businessman
- Galina Anisimova as Vera
- Anna Sinyakina as Call Girl / Dead Princess Olshanskaya
- Filipp Yankovsky as Monk
- Nikolay Chindyaykin as Slava
- Nadezhda Vasilyeva as Borte
- Aleksei Shevchenkov as Nikolai, Waiter
- Vasily Zotov as Young Man in Restaurant
- Andrei Tsygankov as Killer
- Natalya Fateyeva as Railroad Inspector
- Fyodor Sukhov as Valera
- Efim Alexandrov as Diplomat's Friend
- Yevgeny Stychkin as A. S. Pushkin
- Villor Kuznetsov as Aged Waiter
- Andrei Lebedev as Ivanov, Foreign Minister
- Maxim Lagashkin as Guy in the Courtyard
- Oksana Timanovskaya as Irina
- Yelena Shevaldykina as Natasha from Vladivostok
- Malcolm McDowell as Train Driver (uncredited)
- Gennady Khrapunkov in a cameo
- Dmitry Osipov as Conference Speaker
- Alexander Robak as Seryoga

== Crew ==
- Director: Karen Shakhnazarov
- Writers: Karen Shakhnazarov, Alexander Borodyansky
- Cinematographer: Gennady Karyuk
- Composer: Anatoly Kroll
- Art Director: Lyudmila Kusakova
- Producers: Vladimir Dostal, Galina Shadur

== Awards and nominations ==
- Special Prize and Special Mention by the FIPRESCI jury at the 33rd Karlovy Vary International Film Festival (Czech Republic, 1998).
- Presidential Council Prize at the 9th Kinotavr Open Russian Film Festival (1998).
- Nika Award for Best Screenplay to Alexander Borodyansky and Karen Shakhnazarov (1999).
