= Mark Minkov =

Mark Minkov Марк Минков PAR (2003)
- Minkov in 2011

Background information
- Birth name: Mark Anatolievich Minkov
- Born: 25 November 1944; Moscow, Soviet Union (now Russia)
- Died: 29 May 2012 (aged 67); Moscow Oblast, Russia
- Genres: Song; romance; opera; ballet; oratorio
- Occupation: Music composer
- Instrument: Piano
- Years active: 1964–2012

Mark Anatolievich Minkov (Russian: Марк Анатольевич Минков; 25 November 1944 – 29 May 2012) was a Soviet and Russian music composer. His music is featured in a number of operas, ballets, stage performances, and films.

He composed the scores for more than a hundred cinema and television films, including Investigation Held by ZnaToKi (1985), We Are from Jazz (1983) and Neznayka with Our Court (1983).

On May 29, 2012 Mark Minkov died at the age of 68. He was buried at Vostryakovsky cemetery.

== Early life and career ==
Minkov was born in Moscow, USSR. He attended the Merzlyakovki Conservatory School where he studied composition under Nikolay Sidelnikov. He then studied under Aram Khachaturian at the Moscow Conservatory in 1964.

A song by Minkov based on the lyrics Invisible struggle (translit. Nezrimiy Boi - If somebody, somewhere among us, sometimes...) by Anatoly Gorokhov is featured in almost all the series. It became an unofficial hymn of the Soviet Militia. In 2001, he was awarded the MVD Russian Interior Ministry award for the music theme to the Sledstvie vedut znatoki.

== Awards and honours ==
- 1970 – member of the Composers Union
- 1981 – member of the Cinematographers Union
- 1989 – Honored Artist of the RSFSR
- 1999 – Golden Pushkin Medal for "his contribution to the development, preservation and multiplication of the national cultural traditions, help and support of the creative intelligentsia, and development and forming of newer styles and directions in culture".
- 2001 – winner of the award of the Ministry of Internal Affairs of the Russian Federation for the music for the TV movie "The investigation is conducted by experts" (Russian: "Следствие ведут знатоки").
- 2003 – People's Artist of Russia
- Honoured Cultural Worker of Russia Federation
- Laureate Awards of the All-Union and International composer contests
- President of the Russian Cinematic Composers Guild
- Member of the Russian Cinematic Academy Nika Award

== Personal life ==
He was married to Galina Andreevna Minkova. Son is Andrey (born 1975).
