= The Year of the Dog (film) =

1994 film by Semyon Aranovich

- DVD cover
- Directed by: Semyon Aranovich
- Written by: Zoya Kudrya
- Starring: Inna Churikova; Igor Sklyar; Aleksandr Feklistov
- Cinematography: Yuri Shaygardanov
- Edited by: Tamara Guseva
- Music by: Oleg Karavaychuk
- Release date: 1994
- Running time: 133 minutes
- Countries: Russia; France
- Language: Russian

The Year of the Dog (Russian: Год собаки, romanized: God sobaki) is a 1994 romantic drama film directed by Semyon Aranovich and written by Zoya Kudrya. An international co-production between Russia and France, it stars Inna Churikova, Igor Sklyar, and Aleksandr Feklistov. It follows a recently released ex-convict who struggles to reintegrate into society and becomes involved with a middle-aged woman, leading to an unexpected relationship.

The film had its world premiere at the 44th Berlin International Film Festival, where it won the Silver Bear for Outstanding Artistic Contribution. At the 1994 Nika Awards, it received two nominations: Best Actor (for Sklyar) and Best Composer (for Karavaychuk).

== Plot ==
Former criminal Sergei meets Vera - an elderly unhappy woman who lives in a dormitory. After Sergei commits another crime, they run together and along the way they accidentally get into a zone contaminated by radiation. Sergei decides to stay there, but Vera does not leave him. At that moment three looters come to the territory.

== Cast ==
- Inna Churikova as Vera
- Igor Sklyar as Sergej
- Aleksandr Feklistov
- Era Ziganshina
- Mikhail Dorofeyev
- Sergei Bobrov
- Gennadi Menshikov
- Valentina Kovel
- Robert Vaab
- Diana Shishlyayeva
- Irina Polyanskaya
- Dmitri Kruglov
- Tatyana Zakharova
- Marina Yuldasheva
- Viktor Sukhorukov
