= Emilyano Ochagaviya =

Russian actor (1945–2016)

- Born: Emilyano Lorensovich Ochagaviya; May 24, 1945; Kamyshinsky District, Soviet Union
- Died: February 7, 2016 (aged 70); Kostroma, Russia
- Occupations: actor theatre teacher
- Years active: 1965 — 2014
- Awards: People's Artist of Russia (1999)

Emilyano Lorensovich Ochagaviya (Russian: Эмиляно Лоренсович Очагавия; May 24, 1945 – February 7, 2016) was a Soviet and Russian theater actor, Honored Artist of the RSFSR (1986), and People's Artist of the Russian Federation (2000).

== Biography ==
He was born in the village of Nei-colony Kamyshinsky District, Stalingrad Oblast to a father of Spanish Basque ancestry and an ethnic Georgian mother.

Graduated from the Leningrad State Institute of Theater, Music and Cinematography (Georgy Tovstonogov course). Creative activity was begun by him in the theater of twice heroic Baltic Fleet, and then worked in the drama theaters of Kaluga, Kemerovo, and Astrakhan.

Since 1977, he served in Ostrovsky Theatre in Kostroma, where he played many leading roles of classical and contemporary repertoire. In 1999–2003, he headed the theater.

Honorary Citizen of Kostroma Oblast (July 10, 2008).

== Death ==
On Sunday evening, February 7, 2016 in the house on Myasnitskaya Street in Kostroma, where with his family the actor lived, a fire broke out. Firefighters managed to bring the actor, who was asleep, out of the apartment at the time of the fire. However, Emilyano Ochagaviya soon died in hospital in Kostroma.

== Filmography ==
- 2004 — Moscow Saga as Galaktion Gudiashvili
- 2007 — According to the Law of Attraction as old actor
- 2009 — Isayev as episode
- 2009 — Kotovsky as Prosecutor (uncredited)
- 2012 — Solovey-Razboynik as old bandit
