= Anatoly Agranovsky =

Soviet animator and journalist

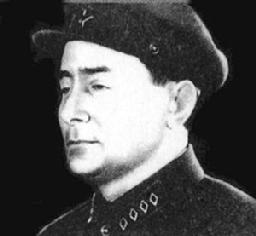
- Anatoly Agranovsky, c. 1940s
- Born: Agranovsky Anatoly Abramovich; 8 January 1922; Kharkov, UkSSR, USSR (present day Kharkiv, Ukraine)
- Died: 14 April 1984 (aged 62); Moscow, Russia
- Education: Moscow State Pedagogical University
- Occupations: Writer, screenwriter, journalist, singer, painter, animator
- Notable work: They Conquer the Skies (1963), I'm Going to Search (1966)
- Children: Alexey Anatolyevich Agranovsky
- Awards: Order of the Badge of Honour, Order of the October Revolution, Order of the Red Banner of Labour

Anatoly Agranovsky
- Military career
- Allegiance: Soviet Union
- Branch: Soviet Air Force
- Service years: 1944–1946
- Rank: Cadet
- Unit: Higher Military Aviation School of Navigators

Anatoly Abramovich Agranovsky (Russian: Анатолий Абрамович Аграновский; January 8, 1922 – April 14, 1984) was a Soviet journalist, novelist, screenwriter, and animator.

== Early life ==
Agranovsky was born on January 8, 1922, in Kharkov, then part of the Ukrainian Soviet Socialist Republic, into the family of journalist Abram Agranovsky. In 1937, his parents were arrested during the Great Purge. He and his brother were placed under the guardianship of their aunt, Gisya Eterman. To support himself, fifteen-year-old Anatoly worked designing and painting cinema posters.

=== Education ===
Agranovsky began studying history at the Moscow State Pedagogical University in 1939 but paused his education to join the military during World War II. From 1944 to 1946, he served as a cadet in the Soviet Air Force and later transitioned into military journalism.

== Career ==
After his demobilization, Agranovsky worked in various artistic roles, including as an animator, assistant cameraman, retoucher, and graphic designer. He also wrote screenplays, which marked the beginning of his literary career. Between 1956 and 1958, he attended the Maxim Gorky Literature Institute.

He worked for many years as a correspondent for Izvestia, where he gained widespread recognition for his reports. He was particularly known for his human-centered stories and profiles of individuals such as ophthalmologist Svyatoslav Fyodorov, whom he followed for years.

In the 1970s, Agranovsky was called "journalist number one". He published more than 20 books in his lifetime. Additionally, Agranovsky was a member of the Union of Writers of the USSR and the Union of Journalists of the USSR. His contributions to Soviet journalism earned him the title of Laureate of the Union of Journalists of the USSR.

== Death ==
He died on 14 April 1984. He was buried at the Vvedenskoye Cemetery.

== Legacy ==
Agranovsky's work greatly influenced Soviet journalism, with many publicists of the Perestroika era citing him as an inspiration.

== Selected filmography ==
- They Conquer the Skies (1963) – Screenwriter
- I'm Going to Search (1966) – Screenwriter
