= Courier (film) =

- Directed by: Karen Shakhnazarov
- Written by: Alexander Borodyansky
- Based on: Courier by Karen Shakhnazarov
- Starring: Fyodor Dunayevsky; Anastasiya Nemolyaeva; Oleg Basilashvili; Inna Churikova
- Cinematography: Nikolay Nemolyaev
- Music by: Eduard Artemyev
- Production company: Mosfilm
- Release dates: 29 December 1986 (Moscow); May 1987 (Cannes)
- Running time: 88 minutes
- Country: Soviet Union
- Language: Russian

Courier (Russian: Курьер, romanized: Kuryer), also known as Messenger Boy, is a 1986 Soviet romantic comedy-drama film directed by Karen Shakhnazarov based on a screenplay by Alexander Borodyansky and Shakhnazarov's short story of the same name, published in the April 1982 issue of the magazine Yunost. The plot revolves around the problems of perestroika-era youth and was filmed by the Creative Association of Comedy and Musical Films of the Mosfilm Studio from May to August 1986. It is one of the first Soviet films to feature breakdancing.

== Plot ==
The film is set in Moscow, 1986; it opens with the Miroshnikovs' divorce. Their son, Ivan, а 17-year-old high school graduate, stays with his mother. Having failed the entry exam for university, his mother finds him a job as a courier for the magazine Questions of Knowledge. On his first day at work, Ivan is sent to deliver a manuscript to Professor Kuznetsov, but instead goes skateboarding with his friend Bazin and ends up being very late in delivering the manuscript. At the professor’s home, Ivan meets his daughter Katya, and they quickly find a common language. During his next visit to pick up the manuscript, Ivan is invited to have lunch with the Kuznetsov family. Ivan’s direct and peculiar statements infuriate the professor, who yells at Ivan and kicks him out. As they say goodbye, Katya tells Ivan that she will call him later.

Ivan and Katya start dating. They meet each other's friends, but neither of them manages to fit into the other's group. Ivan and his family are not rich and spend their time on "budget" entertainment, while Katya is a representative of the "golden youth" with corresponding interests and values. One day when Ivan is visiting Katya, they are playing with the piano and are caught by the professor. He pulls Ivan aside and insists he end all relations with his daughter, saying that Ivan is a bad influence on her, to which Ivan responds by lying that Katya is pregnant by him and asks the professor for her hand in marriage; the professor believes him. The next day, Ivan finds Katya near Moscow State University and tries to apologize for his behavior, but it turns out that Katya also told her parents that she is pregnant. The young people then hide in a nearby basement to conceive the child, but they are ultimately interrupted by a passerby.

In the evening, Ivan comes to Katya's birthday party with flowers to apologize to her family. He unexpectedly joins the guests and the Kuznetsovs' inner circle. The guests' conversation guests turns to modern times and youth, then turns into a confrontation and Katya's awkward confession that her dreams are far from her parents' lofty aspirations. Breaking down, she rushes out into the street, away from the guests. Ivan runs out after her and finds her not far from home. Katya asks Ivan not to come to her or call her anymore.

On the way home, Ivan meets Bazin and asks what he dreams about. Bazin reports that he dreams of buying a coat, because winter is coming soon and he only has a jacket which is too light. After thinking a little, Ivan gives Bazin his coat and advises him to dream about something greater. Ivan walks through the yard, stops, and sees a soldier with a burned face and military awards - a reminder that military service awaits Ivan himself.

== Cast ==
- Fyodor Dunayevsky – Ivan Miroshnikov
- Anastasiya Nemolyaeva – Katya Kuznetsova
- Oleg Basilashvili – Semyon Petrovich Kuznetsov, Katya's father
- Inna Churikova – Lidiya Alekseyevna Miroshnikova, Ivan's mother
- Svetlana Kryuchkova – Zinaida Pavlovna, editorial secretary
- Aleksandr Pankratov-Chyorny – Stepan Afanasevich Makarov, editor-in-chief
- Vladimir Menshov – Oleg Nikolayevich, guest at Katya's birthday
- Alevtina Evdokimova – Maria Viktorovna Kuznetsova, Katya's mother
- Yevdokia Urusova – Agnessa Ivanovna, Katya's grandmother
- Vladimir Smirnov – Nikolai Bazin, Ivan's friend
- Andrei Vertogradov – Fyodor Ivanovich Miroshnikov, Ivan's father

== Production ==
The film's concept was originally written by Shakhnazarov as a short story he wrote in 1982 to be published in the Yunost magazine; it was published in the April issue, and proved a success with readers, but Shakhnazarov did not intend to go further with the concept.

Shakhnazarov's friend, the aspiring director Andrei Eshpai, who at that time was looking for material for his first film, decided to try to make a movie out of the story. Shakhnazarov was not against this, but asked that his friend Alexander Borodyansky write the script for the film. Having received the finished script, Eshpai submitted an application for the film to the Gorky Film Studio in January 1985, but the studio's editors did not approve his application for ideological reasons, since the studio was intended for children's and youth films.

In April 1985, General Secretary of the Communist Party of the Soviet Union Mikhail Gorbachev announced the beginning of Perestroika. Having assessed the changing situation, Borodyansky suggested that Shakhnazarov adapt Courier for the screen himself.

In 1986, the script was significantly rewritten by Borodyansky, and, to the Shakhnazarov's surprise, despite the criticism of the CPSU Party Committee, it was approved by Mosfilm. The plot of the story changed; the protagonist became more modern, and the generational conflict more acute. The difference between the short story and the film adaptation is also noticeable in the endings: the short story ends with Ivan's philosophical reflection on time and old age, while the film ends with Ivan meeting gazes with a soldier who has returned from Afghanistan.

In addition to the actors he already knew, Shakhnazarov invited those he had not worked with before to star in the film. Inna Churikova agreed to play the protagonist's mother. Oleg Tabakov was invited to play the role of Professor Kuznetsov, but he did not respond in time and was eventually replaced by Oleg Basilashvili. The role of Katya went to Anastasiya Nemolyaeva by chance: Shakhnazarov asked the film's cameraman Nikolay Nemolyaev to invite his daughter so that she could play along with the actors who came to the casting for the role of Ivan. Other actresses considered for the role Katya included Irina Apeksimova, Marina Zudina, Alyona Khmelnitskaya, Olga Kabo, Yuliya Menshova, Alika Smekhova, Oksana Fandera, and Lidiya Velezheva.

Hundreds of candidates auditioned for the role of Ivan, including Dmitry Kharatyan, Dmitry Pevtsov, Igor Vernik, Filipp Yankovsky, and Dmitry Iosifov. Fyodor Dunayevsky received the role by chance: he was a classmate of Nemolyayeva, who took photos of several of her classmates to the Mosfilm acting department for auditions. Dunayevsky was invited to audition and then offered the role; he showed up for the audition wearing his grandfather's coat, under which he wore a white hospital gown, since at that time he was working part-time as an ambulance orderly and had come from the night shift. At the audition, Dunayevsky behaved impudently, was rude to the director, and criticized all the dialogue in the script. In an interview with the Trud newspaper in 1989, Shakhnazarov said that the film studio employees categorically did not want to cast Dunayevsky for the role, as he was abrupt and sharp-tongued and was even expelled from medical school because of this, but soon everyone agreed that he was the correct choice. Dunayevsky's upbringing was similar to his character: his parents divorced when he was in high school, he had run-ins with the police for getting involved in fights, and he refused to go to college and got a job as a janitor. Dunayevsky came up with all his lines himself, saying that the script text "did not work" and all the phrases seemed "unnatural" to him.

Since the filming took place during the Perestroika era, the crew had difficulty finding fashionable and elegant clothes for Katya. Because of this, actress Nemolyayeva used her own clothes and the clothes of Shakhnazarov's wife, Alyona Setunskaya. The episode where Churikova and Dunayevsky sing together on a guitar was improvised: during filming, Dunayevsky often strummed on a guitar in his free time. The episode with Vladimir Menshov, where he talks about his son, an athletic judoka who drinks milk from a can, was based on a real event: one of Shakhnazarov's friends told him this story, and he decided to include it in both the short story and the script.

The film stars breakers from the first wave of breakdancing in the USSR. In the scene on the shore of a sand quarry, Denis Dubrovin ("Dan") and Andrei Matsievich ("Tsatsa") performed a breakdance in the "robot" style. The track "Rockit" (1984) by B.T. & The City Slickers (a cover version of Herbie Hancock's "Rockit" from 1983) was playing from a nearby tape recorder. The disco scene was filmed in the youth cafe-club "U Fontana" (popularly known as "Moloko") in the Olympic Village, a fashionable place at the time where breakers often gathered.

=== Filming locations ===
The hearing of the divorce case of Ivan's parents in court was filmed in 7th Rostovsky Lane, Leninsky District Court, now Khamovnichesky Court of Moscow. Ivan skateboarding with Bazin was filmed on the observation deck on Sparrow Hills. The house where Katya lived with her parents was a complex of buildings of the insurance company "Russia". The sand quarry where Ivan imagined an African hunter is a quarry in the Lyuberetsky District.

== Reception ==
On 7 April 1987, in the newspaper Sovetskaya Rossiya, critic Elga Lyndina emphasized that despite his modern emancipation and daring sociability, Ivan is lonely, partly because his father left the family, just when his son needed him so much.

=== Awards ===
On 10 May 1987, Courier won the Children's Jury Prize and the Central Committee of the Young Communist League of Georgia Prize "for a fascinating and witty solution to the complex theme of the formation of a young man's personality" at the 20th All-Union Film Festival in Tbilisi. On 17 July, the film won the Special Jury Prize in the full-length feature film competition at the 15th Moscow International Film Festival. On 17 December 1988, the film was nominated for the Nika Award for Best Soundtrack (composer Eduard Artemyev). Jury chairman Robert De Niro wanted to award Fyodor Dunayevsky the "Prize for Best Actor", but Georgiy Daneliya vetoed this decision.

=== Retrospective ===
In 2014, host of the radio program Radiola Sergei Sychev noted that the film at the time "gained great popularity and introduced breakdancing to young people across the country."

In 2016, the online publication Afisha Daily interviewed Fyodor Dunayevsky for the film’s 30th anniversary, calling his character “a kind of Brother of the late 80s.”

In 2017, Mikhael Agafonov, a journalist for the English online publication The Calvert Journal, mentioned Courier in an article about Soviet b-boys, noting that several scenes that featured breakdancing served as a free dance master class for viewers.
