= Moscow Saga =

- Directed by: Dmitry Barschevsky
- Written by: Natalya Violina
- Produced by: Anton Barschevsky
- Starring: Yuri Solomin; Inna Churikova; Alexander Baluev
- Cinematography: Krasimir Kostov
- Music by: Alexander Zhurbin
- Production companies: Risk Film and Video Studio
- Distributed by: Channel One Russia
- Release date: October 11, 2004
- Running time: 1144 minutes
- Country: Russia
- Language: Russian

Moscow Saga (Russian: Московская сага, romanized: Moscovskaya Saga) is a Russian television series loosely based on the eponymous trilogy by Vasily Aksyonov. The shooting took place in the winter and spring of 2004. It aired from 11 October to 12 November 2004 on Channel One Russia.

== Plot ==
Moscow Saga shows the fate of family of medicine professor Boris Nikitich Gradov from the mid-1920s to mid-1950s against the background of the history of the new Soviet state. Boris' character represents the old dynasty of Russian doctors. His sons and daughter did not continue in his footsteps, but instead chose other professions. The eldest son, Nikita, joined the military; the younger, Kirill, became a Marxist theoretician; and Boris' daughter Nina became a writer.

== Cast ==
- Yuri Solomin as Boris Nikitich Gradov
- Inna Churikova as Mary Gradova
- Alexander Baluev as Nikita Gradov
- Ekaterina Nikitina as Veronica Gradova
- Alexey Zuev as Kirill Gradov
- Olga Budina as Nina Gradova
- Alexey Kortnev as Vadim Vuinovich
- Kristina Orbakaite as Vera Gorda (prototype — singer Nina Dorda)
- Dmitry Kharatyan as Shevchuk (guard in the Gulag)
- Marianna Schultz as Celia Rosenblum
- Victoria Tolstoganova as Tasia Pyzhykova
- Andrei Smirnov as Leonid Pulkovo
- Sergei Bezrukov as Vasily Stalin
- Marina Yakovleva as Agasha
- Alexander Rezalin as Nugzar
- Igor Bochkin as Petukhov
- Ilya Noskov as Boris Gradov IV
- Dmitry Ulyanov as Semyon Stroilo
- Elena Kasyanova as Mayka Strepetova
- Irina Kupchenko as Mayka's mother
- Marina Shvydkaya as Elizaveta
- Andrey Ilin as Savva Kitaygorodsky
- Valery Ivakov as Vaskov
- Vladimir Mironov as Joseph Stalin
- Igor Sklyar as Mikhail Frunze
- Pavel Remezov as Molotov
- Alexei Makarov as Alexander Sheremetyev
- Vitaly Egorov as Sandro Pevzner
- Anna Snatkina as Yolka Kitaygorodskaya
- Vladimir Dolinsky as Shaytis
- Irina Brazgovka as Leonid Pulkovo's beloved
- Mikhail Yefremov as party organizer of the medical institute
- Tatiana Samoilova as Professor
- Vyacheslav Shalevich as General
- Regimantas Adomaitis as journalist Reston
- Emilyano Ochagaviya as Galaktion Gudiashvili
- Nana Mchedlidze as Keke, Stalin's mother
- Alexey Bysh as Obersturmbannfuehrer
