= War is Over. Please Forget... =

- Directed by: Valeriy Kharchenko
- Screenplay by: Galina Shergova
- Starring: Irina Brazgovka
- Cinematography: Vladimir Klimov
- Music by: Eduard Artemyev; Mikael Tariverdiev
- Production companies: VGIK; Nashe Kino; ORF
- Release date: 1997 (Russia)
- Running time: 94 minutes
- Country: Russia
- Language: Russian

War is Over. Please Forget... (Russian: Война окончена. Забудьте…, romanized: Voyna okonchena. Zabud'te...) is a 1997 Russian drama with elements of documentary that unfolds against the backdrop of the First Chechen War.

== Plot ==
The main character is a simple Russian woman. Her son is in the army. The Chechen war begins. His mother is concerned about the lack of reports on his son. While she only realizes that her son is in the war. Next, she tries to learn something and get him out of that hell. The move started up all possible and impossible means: prayer, attempt to bribe, senseless apartments for sale. Suddenly, the son returns, but at a deserter will soon come, and could go no farther... The film is made on the material on the war in Chechnya, involving unique combat chronicles of the archives of the FSB and other special services. At the end of the film is a complete list of Russian soldiers killed in the Chechen war (in 2939 established names), and the text, in which the authors ask for forgiveness from the Soldiers' Mothers, whose children were in the fields of war, because they dared to touch this topic. The last film role of Zinovy Gerdt.

The film was forbidden to be shown on television.

== Cast ==
- Aleksey Dyakov as Dima
- Irina Brazgovka as Dima's mother
- Svetlana Smekhnova as Ulyana
- Zinovy Gerdt as actor (last role)
- Aleksandr Pavlov as general
- Aleksandr Mokhov as delivery of humanitarian aid
- Alyona Grigorieva
- Aleksandr Pankratov-Chyorny as cameo
- Boris Khmelnitsky as cameo
- Stanislav Govorukhin as cameo
- Vladimir Posner as cameo
- Galina Shergova as cameo
- Valeri Yanklovich as Oleg Ivanovich Fedotov

== Awards ==
- 1998 — Prize Nika Award — nominated for Best Actress (Irina Brazgovka)
- 1998 — Prize of the Guild of Russian filmmakers (film)
- 1998 — Jury Prize-governmental Organizations (Brazgovka)
- 1998 — Prize NTV-Kino (Brazgovka)
- 1998 — IFF Stalker
