= Irina Brazgovka =

Soviet and Russian actress

- Born: Irina Vladimirovna Brazgovka; 12 November 1954 (age 71); Minsk, Belarus SSR, Soviet Union
- Occupation: actress

Irina Vladimirovna Brazgovka (Russian: Ирина Владимировна Бразговка; born November 12, 1954) is a Soviet and Russian actress of theater and cinema.

== Biography ==
=== Career ===
She started acting in the cinema from the age of seven. She graduated from the acting department of VGIK (workshop of Sergey Bondarchuk and Irina Skobtseva). She performed in the ensemble of Dmitry Pokrovsky. She starred in more than 60 films and serials.

=== Personal life ===
The actress's father is Deputy Minister of Public Utilities of the Republic of Belarus Vladimir Andreevich Brazgovka. Mother - a teacher in Russian, a teacher of Russian for foreigners Nina Vladimirovna Gedemin.

There are two children. The oldest daughter, Daria, the daughter of Andrei Konchalovsky, works on the BUM Сhannel. The youngest daughter is Alexandra Brazgovka, designer.

== Selected filmography ==
- I'm Going to Search (1966) as Valya
- On the Wolf Track (1976) as Varvara
- Vertical Race (1982) as Lyuda
- Farewell (1983) as girl on a mowing
- Dead Souls (1984) as young merchant
- War is Over. Please Forget... (1997) as mother
- The Tulse Luper Suitcases: The Moab Story (2004) as Katerina
- Moscow Saga (2004) as Klavdiya
- Doctor Zhivago (2006) as Anna Ivanovna Gromeko
- Dead Daughters (2007) as usherette
- I Am (2009) as mother
- Kitchen (2012) as Jael Kopas, an elite film director from Romania
- Kuprin. Pit (2014) as landlady
- Icaria (2019) as Lyubov Viktorovna

== Awards and nominations ==
- Nika Award (1998): Best Actress (nomination) — War is Over. Please Forget...
