= Sea Cadet of Northern Fleet =

- Russian: Юнга Северного флота
- Directed by: Vladimir Rogovoy
- Written by: Eduard Topol; Vadim Trunin
- Starring: Algis Arlauskas; Marat Serazhetdinov; Igor Sklyar; Viktor Nikulin; Marina Samojlova
- Cinematography: Igor Klebanov; Dmitri Surensky; A. Vasilzhenko
- Edited by: Margarita Shadrina
- Music by: Rafail Khozak
- Release date: 1973
- Country: Soviet Union
- Language: Russian

Sea Cadet of Northern Fleet (Russian: Юнга Северного флота, romanized: Yunga Severnogo Flota) is a 1973 Soviet World War II film directed by Vladimir Rogovoy.

== Plot ==
The film takes place during the war. The film tells about four Soviet boys who go to the Solovetsky Islands to the Jung school, which became for them a real school of growing up and a school of life.

== Cast ==
- Algis Arlauskas
- Marat Serazhetdinov
- Igor Sklyar
- Viktor Nikulin
- Marina Samoylova
- Valeri Ryzhakov
- Mikhail Kuznetsov
- Boris Grigorev
- Vasiliy Lanovoy
- Boris Gitin
