= Where is the Nophelet? =

- Directed by: Gerald Bezhanov
- Written by: Anatoly Eiramdzhan
- Starring: Vladimir Menshov; Aleksandr Pankratov-Chyorny
- Cinematography: Vsevolod Simakov
- Music by: Aleksandr Zatsepin
- Production companies: Mosfilm; Creative Union "Rhythm"
- Release date: 1988
- Running time: 77 minutes
- Country: Soviet Union
- Language: Russian

Where is the Nophelet? (Russian: Где находится нофелет?, romanized: Gde nakhoditsa nofelet?) is a Soviet 1988 comedy directed by Gerald Bezhanov.

== Plot ==
Talented engineer Pavel Fedorovich Golikov who works at a research institute in a team comprised purely of females, is surprisingly timid and inexperienced in his relationships with women considering that he is more than forty years old. He is still single and lives with his parents who have long dreamed of having grandchildren. They unsuccessfully introduce him to unmarried daughters of friends in the hope that Pavel will finally marry. But suddenly cheerful and reckless Gena comes to Moscow for furniture - Pavel's cousin. At the request of Pavel's parents, Gena decides to stay in Moscow until he finds a wife for his brother. First, Gena disguises Pavel in a new suit, then they get acquainted with various girls using the pick-up line "Where is the nophelet?" ("Nophelet(e)" is an anadrome — the word "telephone" pronounced in the reverse order). But in his quiet fantasies of family life and children, Pavel sees an unknown female passenger, with whom he travels on a daily bus.

Later Gena's wife arrives who is troubled by his lengthy absence - she is an imperious and commanding woman, and as Pavel's parents look at her they even begin to doubt the need to marry off their son. Subsequently, Pavel sorts out his timidity and decides to speak with the stranger from the bus.

== Cast ==
- Vladimir Menshov — Pavel Fedorovich Golikov, son of Fedor Mikhailovich and Elena Arkadyevna, Gena's cousin
- Aleksandr Pankratov-Chyorny — Gena, Vali's husband, father of two children, Pavel's cousin (singing voice by Mikhail Evdokimov)
- Valentina Telichkina — female stranger on the bus
- Lyudmila Shagalova — Elena Arkadievna Golikova, wife of Fedor Mikhailovich, Pavel's mother, pensioner
- Nikolay Parfyonov — Fedor Mikhailovich Golikov, Elena Arkadievna's husband, Pavel's father, war veteran, pensioner
- Marina Dyuzheva— Marina, Pavel's colleague
- Lyudmila Nilskaya — Vera Simukova, Pavel's colleague
- Natalia Konovalova — Nadia, Pavel's colleague
- Olga Shorina — Lyuba, Pavel's colleague
- Elena Pokatilova — Lena, Pavel's colleague
- Yelena Safonova — Alla, Galya's friend
- Ekaterina Zhemchuzhnaya — Zemfira, gipsy-speculator and fortune-teller
- Irina Rozanova — Valentina, wife of Gena, mother of two children
- Inna Ulyanova — Klara Semyonovna, the head of Pavel
- Natalia Karpunina — Tamara, Zoya's friend, a student of a medical school
- Elena Skorokhodova — Zoya, Tamara's friend, a student of a medical school
- Nina Agapova — aunt Emma
- Inna Alenikova — Emma
- Elena Arzhanik — passer-by who fell for the "nophelet" line
- Rita Gladunko — passenger of a trolleybus
- Mikhail Kokshenov — trolley driver
- Lydia Dranov — cousin of Emma
- Olga Kabo — visitor from the Urals
- Veronica Izotova — passer-by, who fell for the "nophelet" line
- Alexander Pyatkov — thug in a red jacket

== Production ==
The screenwriter Anatoly Eiramdzhan initially wrote the part of Gena for Andrei Mironov. But the actor did not like the idea of getting typecasted as a womanizer, and thus he was to play Pavel in the film instead, but Mironov died in 1987.

Roles for female actresses were decided at random.
