= Anastasiya Nemolyaeva =

Soviet and Russian film/theater actress and designer

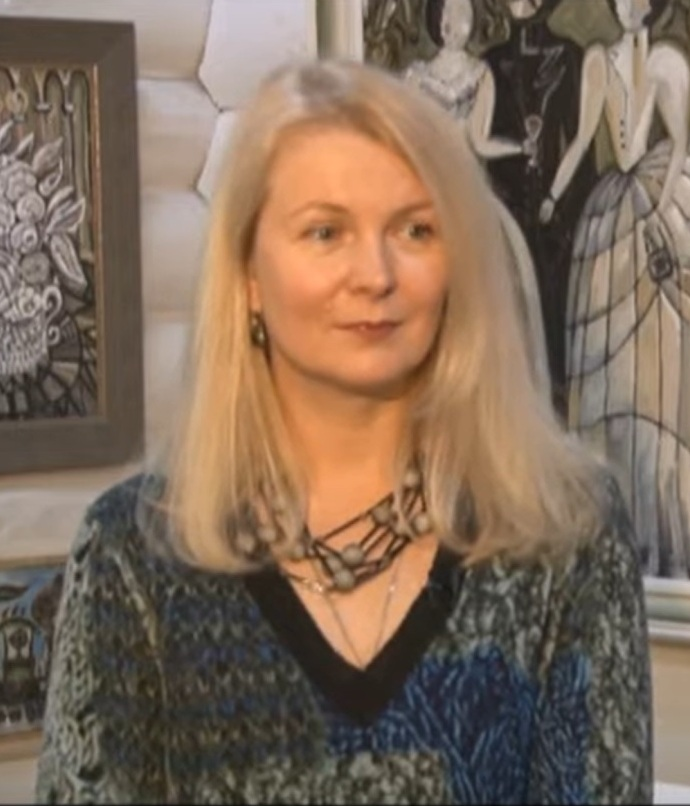
- Born: Anastasiya Nikolaevna Nemolyaeva; 30 June 1969 (age 57); Moscow, USSR
- Occupation: actress
- Years active: 1980–present

Anastasiya Nikolaevna Nemolyaeva (Russian: Анастасия Николаевна Немоляева; was born 30 June 1969) is a Soviet and Russian film and theater actress and designer.

== Biography ==
Anastasiya Nemolyaeva was born June 30, 1969, in Moscow into the family of a cinematographer Nikolai Nemolyaev, brother of the popular actress Svetlana Nemolyaeva. Anastasiya's grandfather Vladimir Nemolyaev was a film director, known for the films Happy Flight, Doktor Aybolit, etc., and her grandmother had a lifelong career as a sound engineer at the Mosfilm.

As a child, Anastasiya was fond of painting and embroidery. She glued toys and covered the kitchen boards with oil paints. Anastasiya actively acted in films as a teenager. In 1991 Anastasiya graduated from Russian Academy of Theatre Arts (acting course of Mark Zakharov). During her studies, she starred in several films, two of which - Courier and Intergirl which brought Anastasiya her the most fame. From 1995 to 1999 she played in the theater on Malaya Bronnaya.

== Personal life ==
Anastasiya Nemolyaeva is married to Benjamin Skalnik and has three children. Together with her husband she is engaged in design business. Anastasiya actively cooperates with many well-known galleries in Moscow. Her work (glass, wood, furniture) are in private collections in Russia, France, Great Britain, Japan, Italy and other countries. Several works by Nemolyaeva are in the Russian Museum of Naïve Art. In 2005 Anastasiya took part in the "Cow Parade" art event in Moscow.

Currently Anastasiya is not working in the theater and is only occasionally in films. Together with her husband she opened her own "Anastasiya Nemolyaeva's Art Studio" and "Benjamin Skalnik's Workshop", where he works as a designer in the art of painting on glass and wood (furniture, dishes), as well painting murals.

== Selected filmography ==
- The Old New Year (1980) as Lisa Sebeykina
- Courier (1986) as Katya
- Intergirl (1989) as Lyalya
- The Assassin of the Tsar (1991) as nurse
- Dreams of Russia (1992) as Tatiana
- Transit (2006) as Irina Zareva
- Major Grom: Plague Doctor (2021) as Elena Prokopenko
- Major Grom: The Game (2024) as Elena Prokopenko
