= They Conquer the Skies =

- Russian: Им покоряется небо
- Directed by: Tatyana Lioznova
- Written by: Leonid Agranovich; Anatoly Agranovsky
- Starring: Nikolai Rybnikov; Vladimir Sedov; Svetlana Svetlichnaya; Yevgeny Yevstigneev; Oleg Zhakov
- Cinematography: Valeri Ginzburg
- Edited by: Ksenia Blinova; Lidiya Rodionova
- Music by: Andrei Eshpai
- Production company: Gorky Film Studio
- Release date: August 26, 1963
- Running time: 80 min.
- Country: Soviet Union
- Language: Russian

They Conquer the Skies (Russian: Им покоряется небо, romanized: Im pokoryaetsya nebo) is a 1963 Soviet drama film directed by Tatyana Lioznova.

== Plot ==
The film tells about a pilot named Alexei Kolchin, who had the honor of being the first to launch a jet plane and test it. The first launch was excellent, but during the modernization of the aircraft, the engine exploded, causing Alexei to die. His friend Sergey Sharov, based on the recommendations of Alexei, makes the second launch...

== Cast ==
- Nikolai Rybnikov as Kolchin
- Vladimir Sedov as Sharov
- Svetlana Svetlichnaya as Nina Kolchina
- Yevgeny Yevstigneev as Main designer
- Oleg Zhakov as Basargin
- Lev Barashkov as undisciplined pilot
- Sergei Blinnikov as constructor
- Georgi Kulikov as Vitaly Ilyich
- Pyotr Shcherbakov as test pilot Pyotr Sushkov
- Ivan Ryzhov as flight inspector
