= Ward Six =

1978 film

- Directed by: Lucian Pintilie
- Written by: Anton Chekhov (Short story)
- Starring: Slobodan Perović; Zoran Radmilović; Slavko Simić; Ljuba Tadić
- Cinematography: Milorad Jakšić Fanđo
- Edited by: Milica Poličević
- Release date: 1978
- Running time: 97 minutes
- Country: Yugoslavia
- Language: Serbo-Croatian

Ward Six (Serbo-Croatian: Paviljon VI) is a 1978 Yugoslav drama film directed by Lucian Pintilie, an adaptation of Anton Chekhov's short story Ward No. 6. It competed in the Un Certain Regard section at the 1979 Cannes Film Festival.

== Cast ==
- Slobodan Perović as Dr. Andrei Yefimich Rabin
- Zoran Radmilović as Ivan Gromov
- Slavko Simić
- Ljuba Tadić
- Dragomir Čumić
- Dušan Vuisić
- Pavle Vuisić as Nikita
- Stevo Žigon
