= Aleksandr Pankratov-Chyorny =

Russian actor and film director (born 1949)

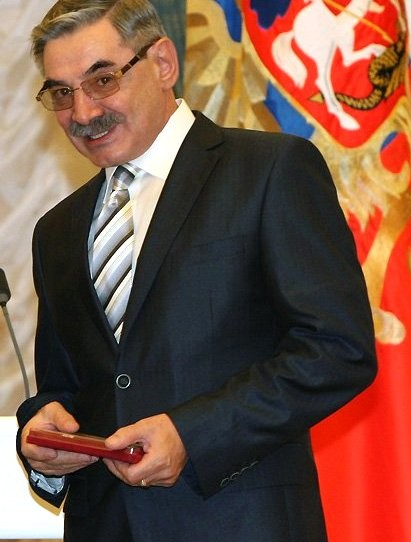
- Born: Aleksandr Vasilyevich Guzev; 28 June 1949 (age 76); Konevo, Pankrushikhinsky District, Soviet Union
- Occupation: Actor
- Years active: 1978-present

Aleksandr Vasilyevich Pankratov-Chyorny (Russian: Алекса́ндр Васи́льевич Панкра́тов-Чёрный; born 28 June 1949) is a Russian actor and film director. He appeared in more than seventy films since 1978.

He was awarded People's Artist of the Russian Federation (2009) for great achievements in the field of cinematographic art.

== Selected filmography ==
Year	Title	Role	Notes
1978	Siberiade	Sashka	
1983	We Are from Jazz	Stepan Arkadyevich Grushko	
1984	Chance	police officer	
1984	A Cruel Romance	Ivan Petrovich Semyonovsky	
1985	Winter Evening in Gagra	Arkady Grachev	
1987	Courier	Stepan Afanasyevich	
1987	Forgotten Melody for a Flute	Sasha	
1988	Where is the Nophelet?	Gena	
1991	Promised Heaven	Sidorchuk	
1995	What a Mess!	Ambassador's bodyguard	
1997	War is Over. Please Forget...	cameo	
2005	The Master and Margarita	Likhodeyev	
2012	Rzhevsky versus Napoleon	adjutant	
2016	Kitchen	Valentin Barinov	
