= Pyotr Shcherbakov =

- Born: Pyotr Ivanovich Shcherbakov; 21 July 1929; Pozdnyakovo village, Kaluga Governorate, RSFSR, USSR
- Died: 16 March 1992 (aged 62); Moscow, Russia
- Education: GITIS
- Occupation: Actor
- Years active: 1953–1992

Pyotr Ivanovich Shcherbakov (Russian: Пётр Ива́нович Щербако́в; 21 July 1929 – March 16, 1992) was a Soviet film and theater actor. People's Artist of the RSFSR (1980). Member of the CPSU since 1955.

== Biography ==
Born July 21, 1929, in the village of Pozdnyakovo (now Kaluga Oblast). After World War II, the family moved to Moscow.

In Theatre Institute Pyotr Shcherbakov was quite by accident. Since that year in GITIS was set only at the Directing Department, Pyotr took directly to the second year of the institute, which he graduated in 1955. At the same time he had while studying to pass exams in the subjects of the first course.

Pyotr served in the Theatre Group of Soviet Forces in Germany (1953–1956), Sovremennik Theatre (1958–1985), Moscow Art Theatre (1985–1991).

He made his debut in cinema in 1956. Actor glorified image Slavka Ufimtsev in the film by Yuri Yegorov Volunteers (1958).

== Death ==
He died March 16, 1992. He was buried at the Vagankovo Cemetery.

== Selected filmography ==
- Pages of the Past (1957) as Aleksey Koren
- Volunteers (1958) as Ufimtsev
- They Conquer the Skies (1963) as Pyotr
- I Am Twenty (1965) as Chernousov
- Thirty Three (1965) as Viiktor Viktorovich
- Chronicles of a Dive Bomber (1968) as Chief of Staff of the Regiment
- Liberation I: The Fire Bulge (1970) as General Telegin
- Liberation II: Breakthrough (1970) as General Telegin
- Liberation III: Direction of the Main Blow (1970) as General Telegin
- Big School-Break (1972, TV Mini-Series) as guest
- The Days of the Turbins (1976, TV Movie) as Studzinsky
- Office Romance (1977) as Pyotr Ivanovich Bublikov
- Investigation Held by ZnaToKi: Till the third shot (1978, TV Series) as Bondar
- The Garage (1980) as Pyotr Petrovich
- The Old New Year (1981) as Poluorlov's friend, a bayan-player
- Tears Were Falling (1983) as Professor Sklyansky
- We Are from Jazz (1983) as Ivan Ivanovich Bavurin
- Crazy Day of Engineer Barkasov (1983, TV Movie) as Abramotkin
- And Life, and Tears, and Love (1984) as Fedot Fedotovich
- Winter Evening in Gagra (1985) as Alexander Alexandrovich, administrator
- Zerograd (1988) as head of city party council
- Frenzied Bus (1990) as pilot
