= We Are from Jazz =

- A film poster
- Directed by: Karen Shakhnazarov
- Written by: Aleksandr Borodyansky; Karen Shakhnazarov
- Produced by: Konstantin Forostenko
- Starring: Igor Sklyar; Aleksandr Pankratov-Chyorny
- Cinematography: Vladimir Shevtsik
- Edited by: Lidiya Milioti
- Music by: Anatoli Kroll (conductor); Mark Minkov (composer); Ella Zelentsova (sound)
- Production company: Mosfilm
- Release date: 6 June 1983
- Running time: 89 minutes
- Country: Soviet Union
- Language: Russian

We Are from Jazz (Russian: Мы из джаза, romanized: My iz dzhaza) is a 1983 Soviet comedy musical film by Karen Shakhnazarov. It is also known as Jazzmen on the official Mosfilm YouTube channel.

The film tells the story of a student who is expelled from music school because he loves jazz. He ends up hiring two street musicians to form his own band.

== Plot ==
In 1926, Kostya Ivanov, a student at the Odessa Music College, becomes captivated by a new musical trend—jazz. His fascination, however, gets him expelled from the college as a member of the Komsomol youth organization.

Determined to start his own jazz band, Kostya attracts two musician friends, street performers Stepa Grushko and Zhora Ryabov, through an ad. Stepa plays banjo and trumpet, while Zhora handles the violin and drums. Kostya introduces them to jazz, and the newly formed band begins rehearsing. Their first performance ends in a brawl with the audience, prompting Stepa and Zhora to quit. Just as Kostya despairs, two “gentlemen” arrive, offering the band a gig at the birthday party of a man known as “Papa.”

The performance at “Papa’s” party—a prominent thief, as it turns out—lands the musicians in a police cell. There, they meet Ivan Ivanovich Bavurin, a saxophonist who used to play in the Preobrazhensky Regiment and is the missing piece Kostya needs for a full jazz band.

Together with Ivan Ivanovich, the group heads to Moscow, only to find a successful jazz orchestra already there. Kostya tries to recruit famous international jazz singer Clementina Fernandez, but the attempt results in the band losing both the singer and their last funds. Their audition before a committee for permission to play in the Hermitage Garden also fails, receiving harsh criticism from the orchestra leader Orlov.

In despair, Kostya’s drummer and saxophonist recall that Kostya once mentioned a jazz theorist captain from Leningrad named Kolbaskin. They think he could offer a positive opinion on Kostya’s music. Unable to locate him, they find someone willing to impersonate Kolbaskin. At the last moment, they realize the captain’s real name is Kolbasev, not Kolbaskin, and their stand-in becomes uncooperative. This moment lifts Kostya’s spirits, pulling him out of his gloom.

The band is eventually taken in by the head of the Association of Proletarian Musicians, a jazz enthusiast. Hopes rise with the arrival of Kostya’s friend from Odessa, Katya, but she soon leaves, uncertain of the band’s prospects or Kostya’s love. Kostya remains with his bandmates, holding onto the hope that success will come their way… But just as things start to improve, jazz is banned in Soviet Russia. However, they have invited the real Captain Kolbasev to their concert in advance.

=== Epilogue ===
Many years later, in 1982, the now-aged friends, now celebrated musicians, perform before a large audience at the October cinema and concert hall in Moscow. Though time has passed, they have stayed true to themselves.

== Cast ==
- Igor Sklyar as Konstantin Ivanov
- Aleksandr Pankratov-Chyorny as Stepan Arkadyevich Grushko
- Nikolai Averyushkin as Georgy (Jora) Ryabov
- Pyotr Shcherbakov as Ivan Ivanovich Bavurin
- Yelena Tsyplakova as Katya Bobrova (aka Isabella Fox)
- Yevgeniy Yevstigneyev as Papa, pickpocket and jazz lover
- Leonid Kuravlyov as Samsonov, head of the Association of proletarian musicians
- Borislav Brondukov as fake of Captain Kolbasyev
- Larisa Dolina as Clementine Fernandez, Cuban singer
- Yuri Vasilyev as Orlov, jazz band leader
- Alexander Pyatkov as Yaryshkin, waiter

== Interesting facts ==
- The film was distribution leader in the USSR in 1983 with 17.1 million viewers.
- The historical records of music of the 1920s were used in the filming.
- The role of Kostya Ivanov was originally intended for Dmitry Kharatyan. Yevgeny Dvorzhetsky and Mikhail Shirvindt were also auditioned for the role.
- Lyubov Polishchuk was auditioned for the role of Clementine.
- Nikolai Yeremenko Jr. and Leonid Yarmolnik were auditioned for the role of Stepan.
- The operator Vladimir Shevtsik sings for the role of Alexander Pankratov-Cherny in the film.
- Larisa Dolina was in the fifth month of pregnancy during the filming.

== Songs ==
- "Старый рояль" (The Old Grand Piano) by Mark Minkov
