= Karen Shakhnazarov =

Russian filmmaker, producer and screenwriter (born 1952)

- Карен Шахназаров
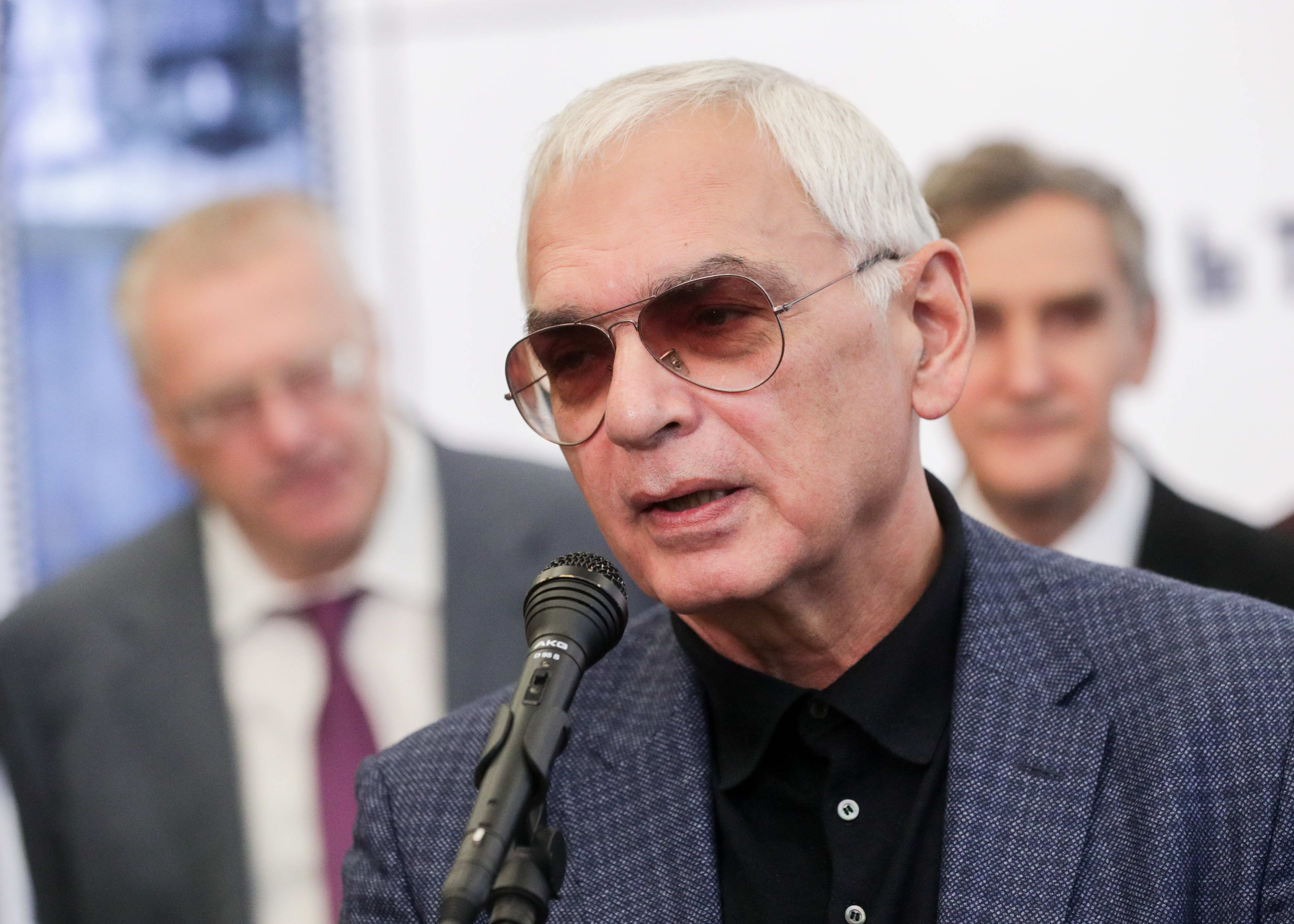
- Shakhnazarov in 2019
- Born: Karen Georgievich Shakhnazarov; 8 July 1952 (age 74); Krasnodar, Russian SFSR, Soviet Union
- Education: Gerasimov Institute of Cinematography
- Occupations: Film director, screenwriter
- Years active: 1980–present
- Title: People's Artist of Russia (2002) (2023)

Karen Georgievich Shakhnazarov (Russian: Каре́н Гео́ргиевич Шахназа́ров; born 8 July 1952) is a Soviet and Russian filmmaker, producer, and screenwriter. He became the director general of Mosfilm in 1998.

== Biography ==
Shakhnazarov is the son of a Georgy Shakhnazarov, a politician of Armenian descent, and a Russian housewife, Anna Grigorievna Shakhnazarova. Shakhnazarov is one of several living descendants of the famous Melik-Shahnazarian princely family from Nagorno-Karabakh. The Melik-Shahnazarians ruled Nagorno-Karabakh's province of Varanda in medieval and modern times.

His 1987 film Courier was entered into the 15th Moscow International Film Festival, where it won a Special Prize. In 2002 he was a member of the jury at the 24th Moscow International Film Festival. Since 2005 he has been a member of the Public Chamber of Russia.

His 2012 film White Tiger was selected as the Russian entry for the Best Foreign Language Oscar at the 85th Academy Awards, but it did not make the final shortlist.

== Political and public activity ==
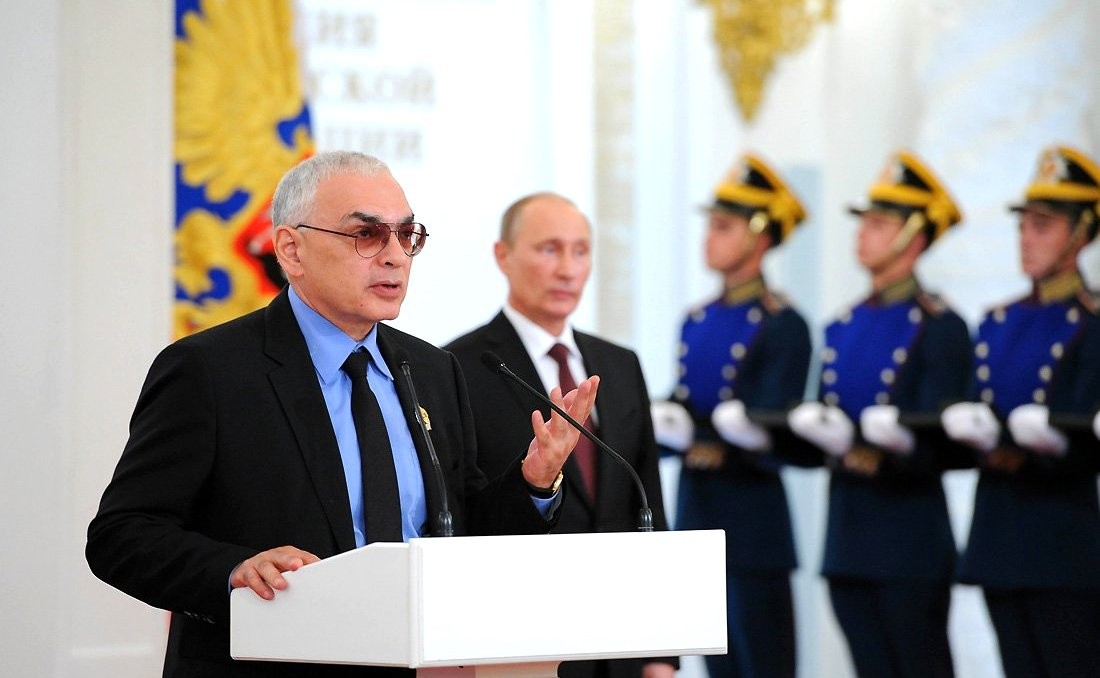
Shakhnazarov receiving the State Prize of the Russian Federation in the field of literature and art, 2013

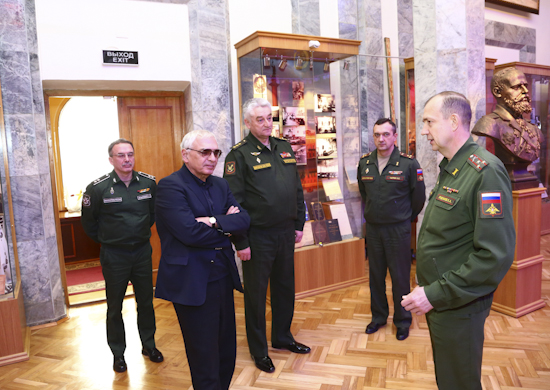
Shakhnazarov at the Military Academy of the General Staff of the Armed Forces of Russia, 2018

In 1998, Shakhnazarov was appointed a member of the board of the State Committee of the Russian Federation for Cinematography.

In April 2000, Shakhnazarov signed a letter supporting the policy of the recently elected Russian president Vladimir Putin in Chechnya.

In 2001, Shakhnazarov was appointed a member of the board of the Ministry of Culture of the Russian Federation.

From 2006 to 2011, Shakhnazarov was a member of the Civic Chamber of the Russian Federation. He was Deputy Chairman of the Commission for Cultural Development and, since 2008, Chairman of the Commission for Culture.

Since January 2012, Shakhnazarov has been a member of the "People's Headquarters" for the city of Moscow of Russian presidential candidate Vladimir Putin.

In March 2014, Shakhnazarov supported the annexation of Crimea and signed a letter to Russian president Vladimir Putin in support of the annexation. For this he was banned from entering Ukraine.

In September 2016, Shakhnazarov became a trusted representative of the United Russia party in the 2016 Russian legislative election.

In January 2018, Shakhnazarov became a trusted representative of Vladimir Putin in the 2018 Russian presidential election. Also in 2018, he became a trusted representative of Moscow mayoral candidate Sergey Sobyanin.

On 15 January 2020, Shakhnazarov was included in the working group for preparing proposals to amend the Constitution of Russia.

On 24 February 2022, Shakhnazarov publicly supported the Russian invasion of Ukraine.

On 28 April 2022, on the Russia-1 TV channel, Shakhnazarov threatened critics of the war with mass reprisals:

These opponents of the letter "Z" must understand that if they expect that they will be spared, no, they will not be spared. Everything is getting serious now. If anything happens, this means concentration camps, re-education, so to speak, sterilization.

He later stated that his words were "taken out of context."

On 10 March 2022, during a broadcast on Russia-1, Shakhnazarov called for an end to the invasion of Ukraine, saying that the situation was at risk of becoming "an absolute humanitarian disaster", and that there is no realistic possibility for the Russian forces to seize Kyiv and other major Ukrainian cities.

At a meeting with President Putin on 13 November 2024, Shakhnazarov stated that Mosfilm had handed over to the Russian Armed Forces in 2023 28 T-55 tanks, 8 PT-76 tanks, 6 infantry fighting vehicles and 8 tow trucks.

== Selected filmography ==
Year	English title	Original title
1984	We Are from Jazz	Мы из джаза
1985	Winter Evening in Gagra	Зимний вечер в Гаграх
1987	The Messenger Boy	Курьер
1988	Zero City	Город Зеро
1991	The Assassin of the Tsar	Цареубийца
1993	Dreams	Сны
1995	American Daughter	Американская дочь
1998	Day of the Full Moon	День полнолуния
2001	Poisons or the World History of Poisoning	Яды, или Всемирная история отравлений
2004	The Rider Named Death	Всадник по имени смерть
2008	Vanished Empire	Исчезнувшая империя
2009	Ward Number 6	Палата № 6
2012	White Tiger	Белый тигр
2017	Anna Karenina: Vronsky's Story	Анна Каренина
2023	Khitrovka. The Sign of Four	Хитровка. Знак четырёх
