= Alexander Borodyansky =

Soviet and Russian screenwriter, film director and teacher

- Александр Бородянский
- Born: Alexander Emmanuilovich Borodyansky; February 3, 1944 (age 82); Vorkuta, Russian SFSR, Soviet Union
- Occupations: Screenwriter, Film director

Alexander Emmanuilovich Borodyansky (Russian: Александр Эммануилович Бородянский; born 3 February 1944) is a Soviet and Russian screenwriter and film director.

== Filmography ==
as screenwriter

- Afonya (1975)
- Dusha (1981)
- We Are from Jazz (1983)
- One Second for a Feat (1985)
- Courier (1986)
- Deja Vu (1988)
- The Assassin of the Tsar (1991)
- Those Old Love Letters (1992)
- American Daughter (1995)
- Day of the Full Moon (1998)
- The Star (2002)
- Georg (2007)
