= First Encounter - Last Encounter =

- Russian: Первая встреча, последняя встреча
- Directed by: Vitaliy Melnikov
- Written by: Vladimir Valutskiy
- Starring: Mikhail Morozov; Grazyna Szapolowska; Oleg Efremov; Boris Plotnikov; Yuriy Bogatyryov
- Cinematography: Yuri Veksler
- Edited by: Zinaida Shejneman
- Music by: Timur Kogan
- Release date: 1987
- Running time: 92 minute
- Country: Soviet Union
- Language: Russian

First Encounter - Last Encounter (Russian: Первая встреча, последняя встреча) is a 1987 Soviet detective film directed by Vitaliy Melnikov.

== Plot ==
The film is about a law student, Pete, who is investigating the murder of one inventor and comes to the conclusion that the German Scholz is to blame for this, as well as that he is not engaged in his own business.

== Cast ==
- Mikhail Morozov as Chukhontsev
- Grazyna Szapolowska as Wanda
- Oleg Efremov as Zanzeveev, an inventor
- Boris Plotnikov as Kuklin, an inventor
- Yuriy Bogatyryov as Major Gei
- Sergey Shakurov as Scholtz
- Mikhail Kononov as Former detective
- Nikolay Kryuchkov as Policeman
- Innokenty Smoktunovsky as Member of counter-intelligence
- Leonid Kuravlyov as Count
