= Vystrel =

Vystrel is a Russian word for a shot (in more narrow meaning a gunshot).

It may refer to:

- Vystrel course (1926–2009), a higher military officers courses of the Workers'–Peasants' Red Army, Armed Forces of the Soviet Union, Armed Forces of the Russian Federation
- Vystrel, a village in Sladkovsky District, Tyumen Oblast, Russian Federation
- BPM-97, a border battle vehicles by the Russian KAMAZ developed in 1997
- The Shot (Pushkin), a book of 1831 by Alexander Pushkin
  - A Pistol Shot (1966 film), a Soviet film of 1966 based on the work of Alexander Pushkin
