= The Seven Brides of Lance-Corporal Zbruyev =

- Russian: Семь невест ефрейтора Збруева
- Directed by: Vitaliy Melnikov
- Written by: Vladimir Valutskiy
- Starring: Semyon Morozov; Natalya Varley; Marianna Vertinskaya; Irina Kuberskaya; Elena Solovey; Tatyana Fyodorova
- Cinematography: Dmitriy Dolinin; Yuri Veksler
- Edited by: E. Sheyneman
- Music by: Gennadi Portnov
- Release date: 1970
- Running time: 97 minute
- Country: Soviet Union
- Language: Russian

The Seven Brides of Lance-Corporal Zbruyev (Russian: Семь невест ефрейтора Збруева, romanized: Sem nevest Yefreytora Zbruyeva) is a 1970 Soviet teen comedy film directed by Vitaliy Melnikov.

== Plot ==
While serving in the military as a conscript, Yefreytor Kostya (Konstantin) Zbruev excels at shooting, which lands him on the cover page of the (fictitious) Skillful Warrior magazine. Women from all over the Soviet Union start writing letters to him. Zbruev chose seven most promising letters, and, once demobilized, went in search of his future wife.

The first bride is lost when he misses his train stop while a female train attendant teaches him modern dancing. Not thinking twice of that, Zbruev continues on his journey.

The second bride lives in a worker's dormitory in a fictitious city of Krasnopryadsk (obviously modeled on Ivanovo, a center of textile industry famous as "the city of brides"). She is childish, awkward, and shy, so after spending several hours with her, Zbruev decides to move on.

The third bride is a famous actress who lives in Moscow and is constantly swarmed by crowds of fans. Zbruev quickly realizes that her turbulent lifestyle is too much for him, and moves on to the next variant.

The bride #4 lives in a small town near Moscow and works as a nurse. She has meticulously planned her future life with Kostya, including the job of an ambulance driver that he should take, their future apartment, and the kids. Appalled by her excessive prudence, Kostya bids farewell and leaves.

On the way to the next destination by train, Kostya meets a young Orthodox priest who also happens to be in search of a wife. Out of boredom, Kostya recounts his story and even shows the photos of the girls. The priest seems to recognize the bride #7, but Kostya brushes it off as a coincidence. He, however, makes the priest a gift by giving him the letter of the bride #4, because he believes they will make a perfect match.

The bride #5, Galina Listopad, is a Komsomol leader and works on a huge construction site in a new town in Siberia. She is charming, merry, energetic, and seems the best variant so far, until it is revealed that she is already married. It transpires that she has signed the letter as a part of her many Komsomol duties, possibly without even realizing what it says.

Kostya comes to visit the bride #6, Valentina Olenyova, who lives in a small village in Siberia. She is nice, industrious, and self-dependent. They take an instant liking and spend a night together, but then Kostya offends her by a careless remark and is thrown out.

The address of the bride #7 is a remote outpost in the Far East. On arrival, Kostya is greeted by a burly fellow who introduces himself as a director of a fur hunting factory. He guiltily admits that the girl #7 never existed. He wrote the letter himself, and the photo is a retouched image from a famous icon (which is why the priest recognized it). Kostya is needed as a hunter due to his superb marksmanship. Despondent and with nowhere else to go, Kostya decides to stay.

The final scene reveals that in due time Kostya made peace with Valentina and eventually married her.

== Cast ==
- Semyon Morozov as Konstantin Zbruev
- Natalya Varley as Galina
- Marianna Vertinskaya as Tatiyana Drozdova
- Irina Kuberskaya
- Elena Solovey as Rimma
- Tatyana Fyodorova as Valentina Olenyova
- Natalya Chetverikova
- Elizaveta Alekseeva
- Valentina Pugachyova
- Olga Grigoreva
