= Marriage (1977 film) =

- Russian: Женитьба
- Directed by: Vitaly Melnikov
- Written by: Nikolay Gogol; Vitaly Melnikov
- Starring: Svetlana Kryuchkova; Aleksey Petrenko; Oleg Borisov; Vladislav Strzhelchik; Borislav Brondukov
- Cinematography: Yuri Veksler
- Edited by: E. Sheyneman
- Music by: Oleg Karavaychuk
- Release date: 1977
- Running time: 99 minute
- Country: Soviet Union
- Language: Russian

Marriage (Russian: Женитьба) is a 1977 Soviet comedy film directed by Vitaly Melnikov. The film is based on the comedy of the same name by Nikolai Gogol.

== Plot ==
A friend of the court adviser Podkolesin was able to convince him to get involved with the daughter of the merchant. But before the wedding, the groom escapes.

== Cast ==
- Svetlana Kryuchkova as Agafia Tikhonovna
- Aleksey Petrenko as Ivan Kuzmich Podkolesin
- Oleg Borisov as Kochkaryov
- Vladislav Strzhelchik as Ivan Pavlovich Yaichnitsa
- Borislav Brondukov as Nikanor Ivanovich Anuchkin
- Yevgeny Leonov as Baltazar Baltazarovich Zhevakin
- Mayya Bulgakova as Arina Panteleimonovna
- Valentina Talyzina as Fyokla Ivanovna
- Tamara Guseva as Dunyashka
- Nikolay Penkov as Stepan
