= Kira Kreylis-Petrova =

Soviet and Russian actress (1931–2021)

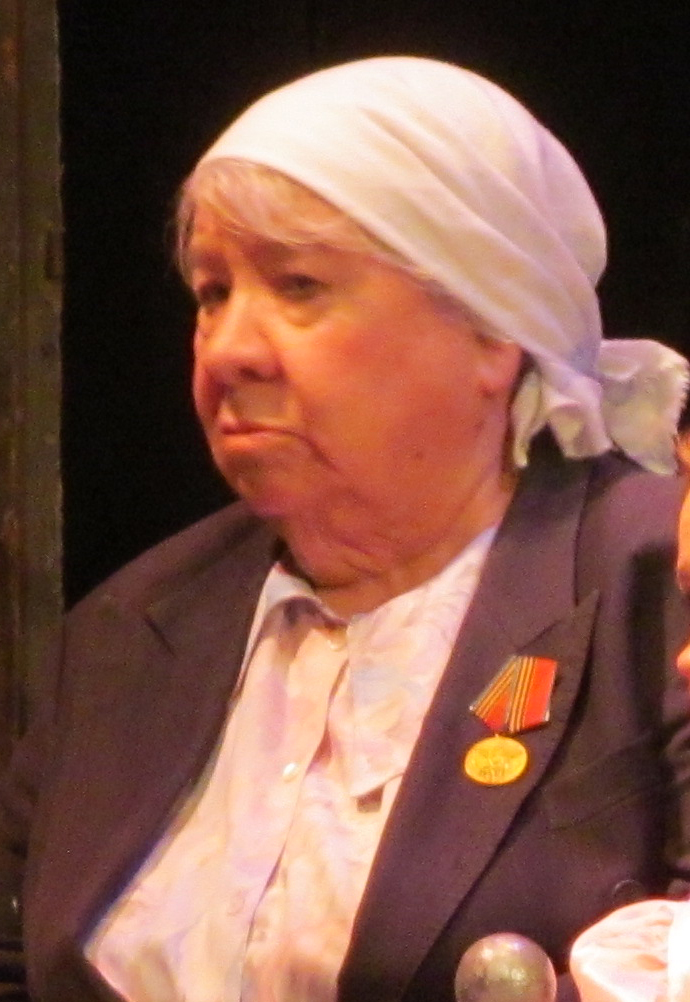
- Kreylis-Petrova in 2015
- Born: Kira Alexandrovna Kreylis-Petrova; 28 August 1931; Leningrad, Russian SFSR, Soviet Union
- Died: 12 May 2021 (aged 89); Saint Petersburg, Russia
- Occupation: Actress
- Years active: 1955–2021

Kira Alexandrovna Kreylis-Petrova (Russian: Кира Александровна Крейлис-Петрова; 1 July 1931 – 12 May 2021) was a Soviet and Russian stage, television, and film actress. She was an Honored Artist of Russia (1993).

== Biography ==
Kira Petrova was born in Leningrad, and as a child survived the Siege of Leningrad. From an early age she engaged in playing the violin, always loved to make people laugh all around. After school, she decided to become an actress. On the first attempt, she entered the Moscow Art Theatre School. In Moscow, which came to the commission of the Art Theatre, flew a telegram: We carry a pearl of laughter.

The course, where she studied, Kira Petrova proved stellar: Galina Volchek, Anatoly Kuznetsov, Igor Kvasha, Leonid Bronevoy, Irina Skobtseva, Pyotr Fomenko, Lyudmila Ivanova and others. Kira married the Institute's future director Yacov Kreylis and took the surname Kreylis-Petrova.

== Career ==
In 1955, Kira Kreylis-Petrova graduated from the Moscow Art Theatre School (course of Alexander Karev).

In 1955–1956, she was a theater actress in Liepāja, in 1956–1957 in the Drama Theatre name of Chekhov (Yuzhno-Sakhalinsk). In 1957–1974, she played in Bryantsev Youth Theatre. From 1980 to 2012, she was Alexandrinsky Theatre's actress.

She played more than 50 roles in film and TV.

== Death ==
She died on 12 May 2021 in Saint Petersburg from cancer.

== Selected filmography ==
- Street Full of Surprises (1957) as passerby woman
- Mama Married (1969) as Lyuda
- Green Chains (1970) as Anastasia, Semyon's wife
- Ksenia, Fedor's Beloved Wife (1974) as episode
- Three Men in a Boat (1979 ) as Polly, Podger's wife
- Forest (1980) as Ulita
- Love by Request (1982) as Vera's mother
- Devil, I'm Bored (1993) as child trafficker
- Drumroll (1993) as the leader of an ancient tribe
- Window to Paris (1993) as Gorokhov's mother-in-law
- Russian Symphony (1994) as Mazdukhina
- Streets of Broken Lights (1998) as episode
- Polumgla (2005) as Lukeriya
- The Kitchen in Paris (2014) as Lyubov, Maxim's grandmother
- Kitchen (2015) as Lyubov, Maxim's grandmother
