= A Pistol Shot =

A Pistol Shot may refer to:

- A Pistol Shot (1942 film)
- A Pistol Shot (1966 film)
