= Yuri Veksler =

Russian cinematographer (1940–1991)

- Юрий Векслер
- Born: Yuri Abramovich Veksler; 4 February 1940; Leningrad, Soviet Union
- Died: 29 September 1991 (aged 51); Leningrad, Soviet Union
- Occupations: Cinematographer, screenwriter
- Years active: 1957–1991
- Spouse: Svetlana Kryuchkova (1975–1988)
- Awards: USSR State Prize (1985)

Yuri Abramovich Veksler (Russian: Юрий Абрамович Ве́кслер; 4 February 1940 – 29 September 1991) was a Soviet and Russian cinematographer.

== Biography ==
Veksler was born in Leningrad, where he survived its siege as a child. In 1957 he started work at the Lenfilm studio as a darkroom student where, under the guideship of cinematographer Dmitry Dolinin, he began his career as a cinematographer.

He died at his birthplace from a heart attack at the age of 51, and was buried at the Sestroretskoye Cemetery.

== Filmography ==
- 713 Requests Permission to Land (1962)
- The Seven Brides of Lance-Corporal Zbruyev (1970; together with Dmitry Dolinin)
- Hello and Goodbye (1972)
- Strange Adults (1974)
- Ksenia, Fedor's Beloved Wife (1974)
- The Elder Son (1976)
- The Key That Should Not Be Handed On (1976; together with Dmitry Dolinin)
- Marriage (1977)
- Sherlock Holmes and Dr. Watson (1979)
- The Adventures of Sherlock Holmes and Dr. Watson (1980)
- The Hound of the Baskervilles (1981; co-screenwriter only)
- The Queen of Spades (1982)
- The Treasures of Agra (1983)
- Boys (1983)
- Another Man's Wife and a Husband Under the Bed (1984)
- Charlotte's Necklace (1984)
- Winter Cherry (1985)
- The Twentieth Century Approaches (1987)
- First Encounter - Last Encounter (1987)
- Presumption of Innocence (1988)
- Dude — Water Winner (1991)

== Awards and honours ==
- USSR State Prize (1985) – for film Boys
- Medal "For Distinguished Labour" (22 August 1986)
- Honoured Worker of the Arts Industry of the RSFSR (17 June 1991)
