= The Admirer (2012 film) =

- Film poster
- Russian: Поклонница
- Directed by: Vitaliy Melnikov
- Written by: Vitaliy Melnikov
- Produced by: Olga Agrafenina; Dmitriy Meskhiev; Yuriy Sapronov; Andrey Smirnov
- Starring: Kirill Pirogov; Svetlana Ivanova; Oleg Andreyev; Aleksandr Adabashyan; Ivan Krasko
- Cinematography: Sergey Astakhov; Stepan Kovalenko
- Music by: Igor Kornelyuk
- Production company: Lenfilm
- Release date: December 24, 2012
- Running time: 102 min.
- Country: Russia
- Language: Russian

The Admirer (Russian: Поклонница) is a 2012 Russian drama film directed by Vitaliy Melnikov.

== Plot ==
The film tells about the relationship of the seriously ill Anton Chekhov with the married writer Lydia Avilova.

== Cast ==
- Kirill Pirogov
- Svetlana Ivanova
- Oleg Andreyev
- Aleksandr Adabashyan
- Ivan I. Krasko
- Svetlana Kryuchkova
- Dmitri Lunev
- Oksana Mysina
- Oleg Tabakov
- Artem Yakovlev
- Mariya Zhilchenko
- Zoya Buryak
- Alexei Devotchenko
