= Day of Sun and Rain =

- Russian: День солнца и дождя
- Directed by: Viktor Sokolov
- Written by: Edvard Radzinsky
- Starring: Aleksandr Barinov; Anatoliy Popov; Aleksandr Sokolov; Yelizaveta Time; Svetlana Savyolova
- Cinematography: Vladimir Chumak
- Edited by: Tamara Denisova
- Music by: Gennadi Portnov
- Release date: 1967
- Country: Soviet Union
- Language: Russian

Day of Sun and Rain (Russian: День солнца и дождя, romanized: Den solntsa i dozhdya) is a 1967 Soviet family film directed by Viktor Sokolov.

== Plot ==
The film tells about the 7th grade students Kolya and Alyosha, who do not like each other. And suddenly they decide to run away from their lessons and spend the whole day together, which changed their attitude both towards each other and towards the world around them...

== Cast ==
- Aleksandr Barinov as Aleksey (as Sasha Barinov)
- Anatoliy Popov as Nikolai (as Tolya Popov)
- Aleksandr Sokolov as Aleksei's Father
- Yelizaveta Time as Actress (as Yelizaveta Time-Kachalova)
- Svetlana Savyolova as Aleksei's Sister
- Mikhail Kozakov
- Tatyana Piletskaya
- Aleksey Petrenko
