= Farewell in June =

Two-act play by Alexander Vampilov

- Original title: Прощание в июне
- Written by: Alexander Vampilov
- Characters: Nikolai Kolesov, biology student Vasya Bukin, Kolesov's friend, geology student Grisha Frolov, Kolesov's fellow student Gomyra, Bukin's friend, geology student Vladimir Alekseevich Repnikov, Tanya's father, rector of the university Tanya, Repnikov's daughter Zolotuyev, owner of a country house Masha, biology student, Bukin's fiancée Repnikova, Repnikov's wife milician other students
- Original language: Russian
- Genre: full-length play

Premiere
- Date premiered: 1966

Farewell in June (Russian:Proshchanie v iiune) is a full-length play in two acts by Alexander Vampilov. The play was written in 1964, first published in Angara's No. 1, 1966 issue (Irkutsk), and premiered in 1966.

== Plot ==
Biology student Nikolai Kolesov meets Tanya, the daughter of the rector of his university, Repnikov. His love for the young woman is put to the test by the proposal of Tanya's father to give up his feelings in exchange for a great academic career.

== Characters ==
- Nikolai Kolesov, biology student
- Vasya Bukin, Kolesov's friend, geology student
- Grisha Frolov, Kolesov's fellow student
- Gomyra, Bukin's friend, geology student
- Vladimir Alekseevich Repnikov, Tanya's father, rector of the university
- Tanya, Repnikov's daughter
- Zolotuyev, owner of a country house
- Masha, biology student, Bukin's fiancée
- Repnikova, Repnikov's wife
- milician
- other students
