= Polumgla =

2005 Russian World War II film

- Russian: Полумгла
- Directed by: Artem Antonov
- Written by: Igor Bolgarin; Viktor Smirnov
- Produced by: Igor Kalenov
- Starring: Yuri Tarasov; Sergey Gryaznov; Anastasiya Sheveleva.
- Production company: Nikola-film
- Release date: 2005
- Running time: 100 min.
- Country: Russia
- Language: Russian

Polumgla, also known as Twilight, is a 2005 Russian World War II film, directed by Artem Antonov, in his directorial debut, at the age of 26. The film was written by Igor Bolgarin and Viktor Smirnov, and stars Yuri Tarasov, Sergey Gryaznov and Anastasiya Sheveleva.

== Synopsis ==
The film concerns the relationship between German prisoners of war and local women in the remote Soviet village of Polumgla, located in Archangel province. In the winter of 1944 in Polumgla, the locals consist almost entirely of women, since most of the men have been mobilised to military service.

The film focuses on the circumstances of a young Lieutenant in the Russian army, Grigori Anokhin, played by Yuri Tarasov, who is stuck in a sanatorium but eager to return to the front in order “to kill the fascists”, as he says. Traumatized by witnessing the massacre of his comrades, he has taken to drink and he is ready to exact revenge. His attempts to return to the front, however, are frustrated, when he is assigned a different mission. With a team of soldiers unfit for duty at the front, he is ordered to take a group of fifteen German prisoners and their commanding officer to the remote village of Polumgla, to construct a radio tower for use as an airplane beacon.

With the ability to communicate only in rudimentary phrases and left to their own devices far away from the war, the villagers, soldiers and the German prisoners slowly begin to coexist peacefully.

The film ends with a detachment of NKVD soldiers arriving and declaring that the war is over, and that the radio tower the German prisoners of war have been working on for a year is no longer of any use. All of the German prisoners of war, many of whom have become intimate with the village women, are marched off into the woods and executed.

== Cast ==
- Yuri Tarasov Grigori Anokhin
- Sergey Gryaznov Chumachenko
- Anastasiya Sheveleva Palashka
- Martin Jackowski Hans
- Lidiya Bairashevskaya Feonia
- Christian Sengewald Peter
- Natalya Burmistrova Evdokiya
- Vitaly Kovalenko Mitrofan
- Kira Kreylis-Petrova Lukeriya
- Evgeniy Merkurev Old man Severianych
- Aleksandr Stekolnikov Radio operator
- Nikolay Spiridonov Keshka
- Anatoliy Gorin The invalid, Ignashka
- Vladimir Kolesnikov Convoy guard 1
- Johannes Rapp Captain Bulbach
- Nikita Loginov Convoy guard 2
- Aleksandr Balsanov Vitka the sailor
- Sergey Losev Major
- Sergei Kozyrev Batyuk
- Pyotr Korolyov Railway worker
- Ekaterina Frolova Nurse
- Margarita Ivanova
