= Four Hands Dinner =

- Russian: Ужин в четыре руки
- Directed by: Mikhail Kozakov
- Written by: Mikhail Kozakov
- Produced by: Ruben Dishdishyan
- Starring: Anatoliy Grachyov; Mikhail Kozakov; Evgeniy Steblov
- Cinematography: Nikolai Vasilkov
- Music by: Nikolai Martynov
- Release date: 1999
- Country: Russia
- Language: Russian

Four Hands Dinner (Russian: Ужин в четыре руки) is a 1999 Russian musical drama film directed by Mikhail Kozakov.

== Plot ==
The film takes place in Leipzig in 1747. Handel invites Bach to dine at the hotel and gradually they begin to understand each other.

== Cast ==
- Anatoliy Grachyov as Johann Christoph Schmidt (as Anatoli Grachyov)
- Mikhail Kozakov as George Frideric Handel
- Evgeniy Steblov as Johann Sebastian Bach
