= Mikhail Kozakov =

Russian director and actor (1934–2011)

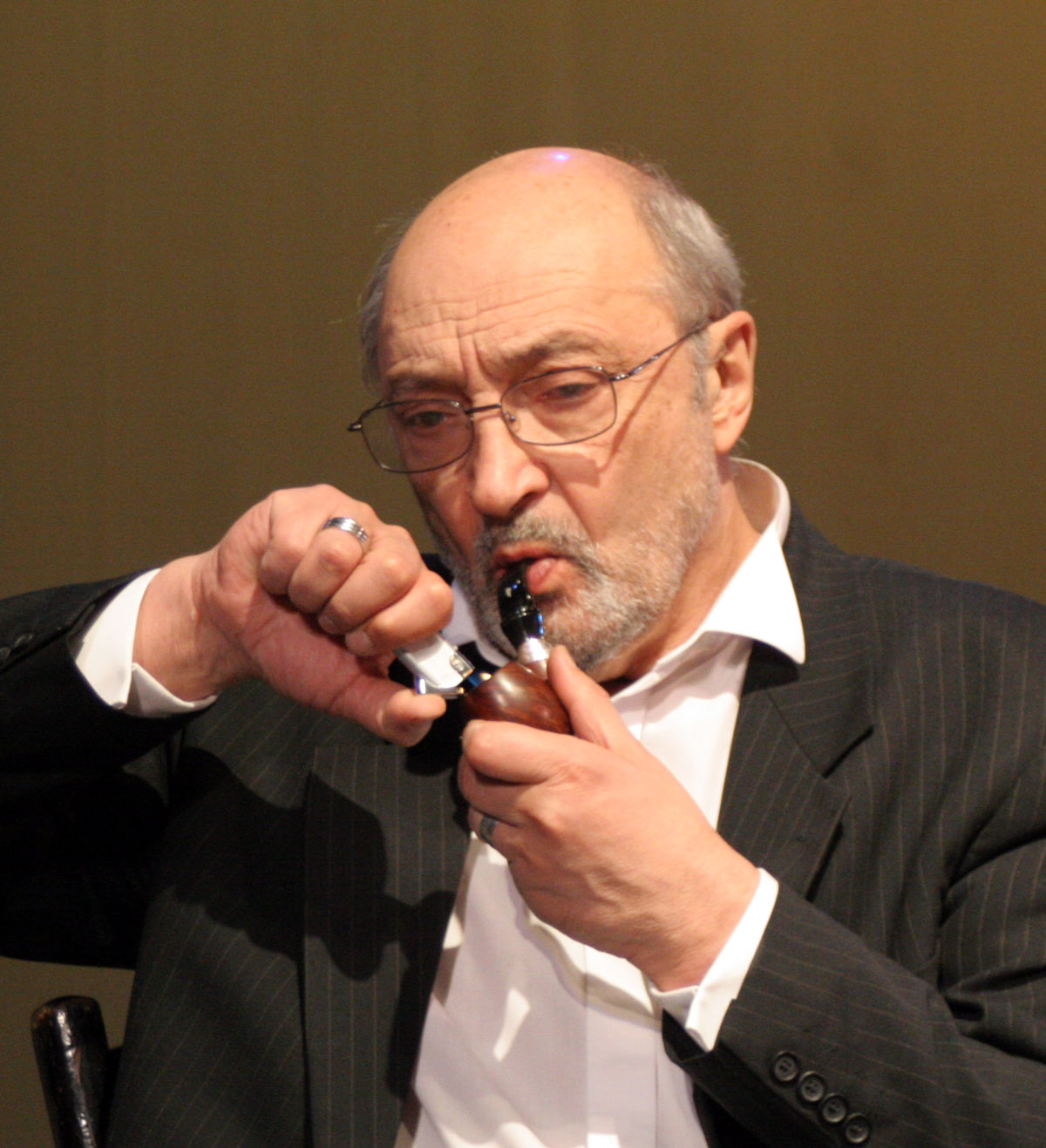
- Born: 14 October 1934; Leningrad, Soviet Union
- Died: 22 April 2011 (aged 76); Ramat Gan, Israel
- Occupations: Actor, film and theater director, screenwriter
- Children: 5

Mikhail Mikhailovich Kozakov (Russian: Михаил Михайлович Козаков; 14 October 1934, Leningrad – 22 April 2011, Ramat Gan) was a Soviet, Russian and Israeli film and theatre director and actor.

== Biography ==
=== Early life ===
Mikhail Kozakov was born on 14 October 1934 in Leningrad, the youngest of three brothers. His father Mikhail Emmanuilovich Kozakov was a Soviet writer and playwright of Jewish origin originally from the Poltava Governorate who served as a commissar in Lubny during the Russian Civil War, then worked as a journalist in Leningrad. He was among the authors who collaborated on The I.V. Stalin White Sea – Baltic Sea Canal.

Kozakov's mother Zoya Alexandrovna Nikitina (née Gatskevich) was of mixed Serbian-Greek descent. Her family moved from Odessa to St. Petersburg. She finished the Karl May School and worked as an editor in publishing houses, the Leningrad Literature Fund (Litfund) and various magazines. This was her fourth marriage. She was arrested twice: first in 1937 following the arrest of her brother who served in the Imperial Russian Army during the civil war (he was sentenced to death while she spent a year in prison), then — in 1948 because of financial violations in Litfund (released in 1950). She was friends with many acclaimed writers who visited Kozakovs' apartment on the Griboyedov Canal, including Evgeny Schwartz, Mikhail Zoshchenko, Anatoly Marienhof, Boris Eikhenbaum and Anna Akhmatova.

During the war Kozakov was evacuated to the Molotov Oblast along with other Leningrad children where he lived from 1941 to 1944. He then returned to the city and continued the secondary education. His brother Vladimir volunteered for the frontline and was killed in 1945. His second brother Boris was accidentally shot in 1946 in his flat by his classmate.

=== Theatre ===
In 1956, Mikhail Kozakov graduated from the Moscow Art Theatre School. In the summer of this year the picture by Mikhail Romm Murder on Dante Street was released, in which Kozakov acted, and in the autumn of that year he received the role of Hamlet in the performance at the Mayakovsky Theatre.

From 1956 to 1959 Kozakov was an actor of the Mayakovsky Theatre.

From 1959 to 1970 he was an actor of the Sovremennik Theatre.

In the 1960s, Kozakov played several vivid roles, such as Cyrano de Bergerac (Cyrano de Bergerac of Rostand, director Efremov, 1964) in the play of the Sovremennik Theater; chamberlain from Schwarz's fairy tale "The Naked King" - a performance that in 1960 brought the theater a triumph, and then turned into a legend; Kistochkin in the comedy Aksenova "Always on sale" (director O. Efremov, 1965).

On the stage of Sovremennik, Kozakov performed several more roles in the productions of Galina Volchek: Aduyev the elder in Ordinary History I. Goncharov (1966, State Prize of the USSR); Jerry Raiin in "Two on the swing" by W. Ibsen; The actor in M. Gorky's play "The Lower Depths"; Nicholas I in the "Decembrists" by L. Zorin (director O. Efremov); Master Zhivko in the "Masters" R. Stoyanov (Bulgarian director V. Tsankov), etc.

In 1970, the actor left the Sovremennik. A year after he left the theater and its founder - Oleg Efremov. Following Efremov, Kozakov came to the Moscow Art Theater. There they were played by Lord Goring in "Ideal husband" Wilde (director Stanitsyn), Gusev in the play "Valentine and Valentina" Roshchina (director Efremov).

In the Moscow Art Theater, Kozakov began to play Leonid Zorin's play The Copper Grandmother, where Rolan Bykov rehearsed Pushkin's role. The play was closed, and Kozakov went to the Theater on Malaya Bronnaya to Dunayev and Efros. Here the actor performed several more roles: Don Juan (Don Juan by J.-B. Molière, 1973); Kochkarev ("The Marriage" by NV Gogol, 1975); Rakitina ("A Month in the Country" by IS Turgenev, 1978).

There, in Malaya Bronnaya, Kozakov staged two performances: Zorin's comedy The Pokrovsky Gate and O'Neill's play The Soul of the Poet.

In 1986, Kozakov left the Theater on Malaya Bronnaya in Lenk. In 1986, he played the role of Polonius in Panfilov's Hamlet at the Lenkom Theatre, later, in the late 1990s, Shadow of the Father in the same Hamlet by German director Peter Stein.

=== Film ===
In 1978, Kozakov made his debut as a film director, with the two-part television film Nameless Star, based on the play of Mikhail Sebastian. Afterwards there were films The Pokrovsky Gate (1982), If We Believe Lopotukhin... (1983), Trustees by A.N. Ostrovsky (1983), Masquerade by M. Lermontov (1985) and others.

During the years of perestroika, Kozakov left Russia. However, after working in the Cameri Theater in Tel Aviv, Israel, as an actor and director (the role of Trigorin in Chekhov's "The Seagull" in Hebrew, staging and playing in "Lover" Harold Pinter, etc.), Mikhail Kozakov chose to return to Russia. In Moscow, he created his own theater called "Russian Entreprise Mikhail Kozakov."

Since 2003, Kozakov was actor of the Mossovet Theatre ("Venetian merchant" - Shylock, "King Lear" - Lear). The actor read poetry on stage, radio, television, and recorded discs.

In 1999, the actor, together with saxophonist Igor Butman, staged a play-concert on Brodsky's verses "Concert for voice and saxophone".

In 1997, Mikhail Kozakov's "Acting Book" was published, in which he tells about his life, about different times and people of art in them.

=== Death and personal life ===
In 2010 Kozakov was diagnosed with lung cancer. He went through unsuccessful treatment in Israel and died on 22 April 2011 in a clinic near Tel Aviv. He was buried at the Vvedenskoye Cemetery in Moscow near his father, in accordance with his will.

Kozakov was officially married five times. He left his last wife Nadezhda Sedova (47 years younger than him) in 2010 with a scandal, claiming that she had stolen his flat and that she was the cause of his illness, and fled to his fourth wife Anna Yampolskaya who lived in Israel along with their children Michael and Zoia. He had a daughter Katerina and a son Kirill, also a prominent Russian actor, from his first marriage to Greta Taar, as well as a daughter Manana from his second marriage to Medea Berelashvili. A son of his - Michael - is now the bassist for the band Good Kid.

=== Honors ===
Kozakov - People's Artist of Russia (1980), laureate of the State Prizes of the USSR (1967) and the RSFSR (1983), art director of the theater "Russian Entreprise of Mikhail Kozakov"

== Selected filmography ==
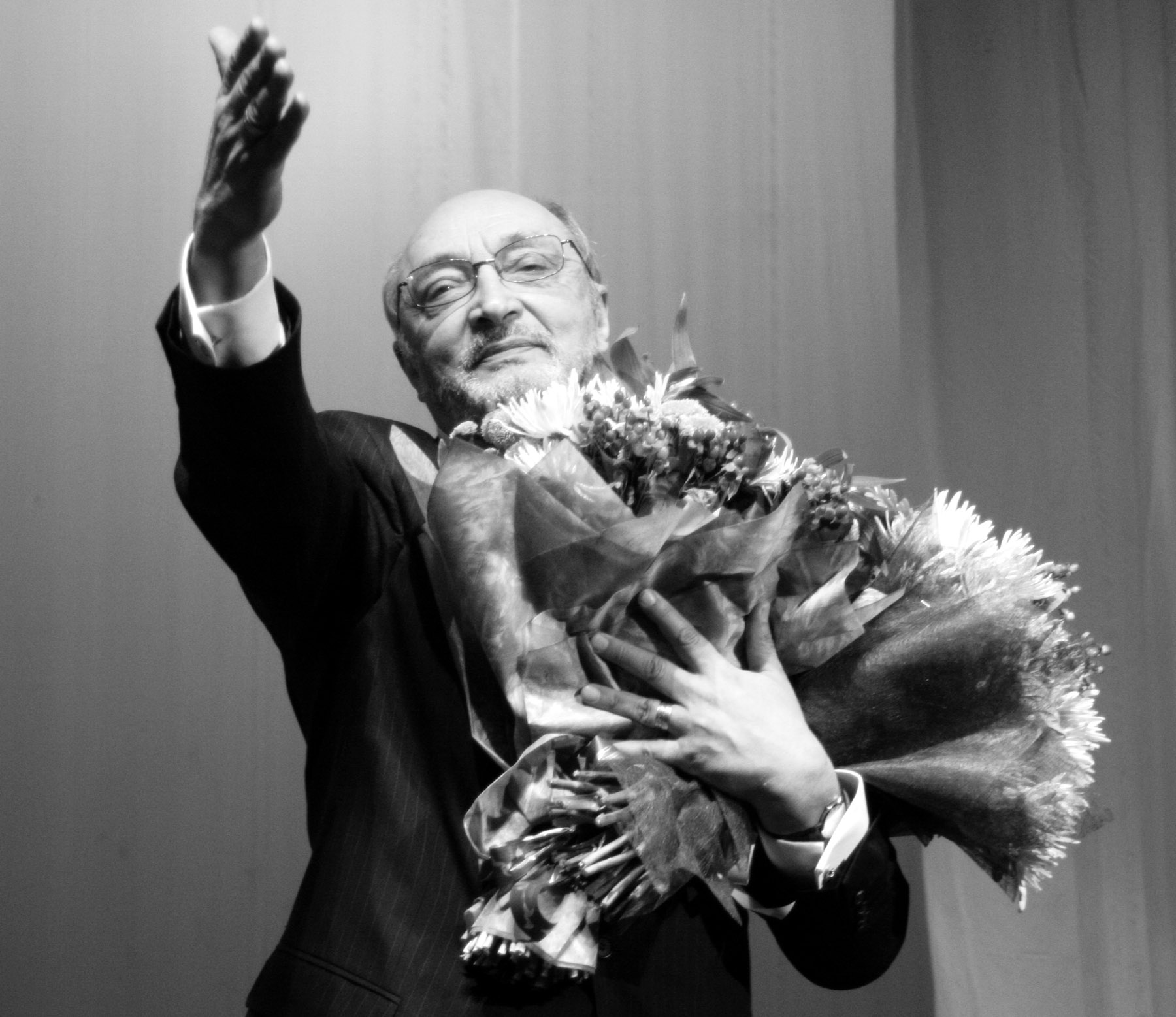
Mikhail Kozakov

=== Actor ===
- Murder on Dante Street (1956) — Charles Thibault
- Hard Happiness (1958) — Nikolai Nagorny
- The Sisters (1957 film) (1959) —Valerian Onoli
- The Golden Echelon (1959) — Cheremisov
- Far from the Motherland (1960) — Hauptmann Saugel
- Eugenia Grandet (1960) — Charles Grandet
- Last Salvos (1960) — Gorbachev
- Baltic Skies (1960) — Baiseitov, pilot
- Crazy Court (1961) — Michel
- Nine Days in One Year (1962) — Valery Ivanovich
- Amphibian Man (1962) — Pedro Zurita
- The Bridge Is Built (1965) — Mammadov
- A Pistol Shot (1966) — Silvio
- Day of Sun and Rain (1967) — actor as Mishka Japonchik (cameo)
- The Red and The White (1967) — Nestor
- The Tale of the Chekist (1969) — Belov
- Two Days of Miracles (1970) — professor-examiner of the Institute of Good Wizards
- Goya or the Hard Way to Enlightenment (1971) — Gilmarde
- All the King's Men (1971) — Jack Burden
- Grandmaster (1972) — Volodya
- Childhood. Adolescence. Youth (1973) — Pyotr Alexandrovich
- Acting (1973) — Alexander Stern
- The Dombey and the Son (1974) — Sol Giles
- Ivan and Marya (1974) — Cashier
- Lev Gurych Sinichkin (1974) — Zefirov
- The Straw Hat (1974) — Viscount de Rosalba
- Car, Violin and Blot the Dog (1974) — musician playing violin and bass guitar and shashlik vendor
- Hello, I'm Your Aunt! (1975) — Colonel Sir Francis Chesney
- Yaroslav Dombrovsky (1975) — Andrey Vasiliev
- The Theater of an Unknown Actor (1976) — Genrikh Genrikhovich
- The Road to Calvary (1977) — Bessonov
- Nameless Star (1978) — Grig
- The Life of Beethoven (1978) — Gioachino Rossini
- Comedy of Errors (1978) — Anoifall
- A Handsome Man (1978) — Lupachev
- Deficit on Mazaev (1979) — Kira's lover
- The State Border. Peaceful Summer of the 21st Year (1980) — Felix Dzerzhinsky
- Sindicat-2 (1981) — Felix Dzerzhinsky
- December, 20th (1981) — Felix Dzerzhinsky
- And I'm With you Again (1981) — Pyotr Yakovlevich Chaadaev
- Comrade Innokenty (1981) — Sergei Vasilievich Zubatov
- The Sixth (1981) — Illary Danilovich Danilevsky
- Who Is Knocking on the Door? (1982) — Actor playing Cyrano de Bergerac
- The Pokrovsky Gate (1982) — Konstantin Romin 25 years later
- Demidovs (1983) — Biron
- Unicum (1983) — Iosif Timurovich Petrov, hypnotist
- The hero of Her Novel (1984) — Erast Tsykada
- An Incredible Bet, or a True Incident That Ended Successfully a Hundred Years Ago (1984) — Dudnikov, summer resident
- Scenes From the Tragedy “Faust" (1984) — Faust
- Scenes From the Drama "Masquerade" (1985) — Arbenin
- Mister Designer (1988) — Grillio
- And it Happened in Vichy (1989) — doctor
- Fools Die on Fridays (1990) — Geliy Ivanovich
- The Shadow, or Maybe It Will All Come Round (1991) — Caesar Borgia
- Gisele's Mania (1995) — Akim Volynsky
- The Fatal Eggs (1996) — Woland
- Tribute (1999) — Scottie Templeton
- Four Hands Dinner (1999) — Georg Friedrich Handel
- 24 Hours (2000 film) (2000) — Costa
- Avalanche (2001) — Lev Borisov
- Game in Modern (2002) — Frieze
- Thieves and Prostitutes. The Prize is Space Flight (2004) — photographer
- The Death of Tairov (2004) — Alexander Yakovlevich Tairov
- Wonderful Valley (2004) — grandfather Said
- We Are Playing Shakespeare (2004) — Narrator
- Narrow Bridge (2005) — Yakushev
- Hello, We are Your Roof! (2005) — Solomon
- The Shift (2006) — Kharitonov, Academician
- Creation of Love (2006) — Nahum Trakht
- Carrot-Love (2007) — Dr. Kogan
- Carrot-Love 2 (2008) — Dr. Kogan
- Orange Juice (film) (2009) — Leonid, Dasha's father
- Zoya (2010) — Vladimir Rapoport
- The Guardians of the Network (2010) — Sergey Ivanovich Kalgarov
- Boris Godunov (2011) — Pimen
- Fairytale.Is (2011) — Stanislav Dalievich Salvadorov, director of the school
- Last Meeting (2011) — Yuri Vladimirovich Andropov
- Carrot-Love 3 (2011) — Dr. Kogan

=== Director ===
- Nameless Star (1978)
- The Pokrovsky Gate (1982)
- If We Believe Lopotukhin... (1983)
- Petersburg Fantasy (1987)
- Visit of a Lady (1989)
- The Shadow, or Maybe all will end Good (1991)
- Four Hands Dinner (1999)
- Joker (2002)
- Playing Shakespeare (documentary) (2004)
- The Charm of Evil (2006)
