= Boris Plotnikov =

Soviet and Russian actor (1949–2020)

- Борис Плотников
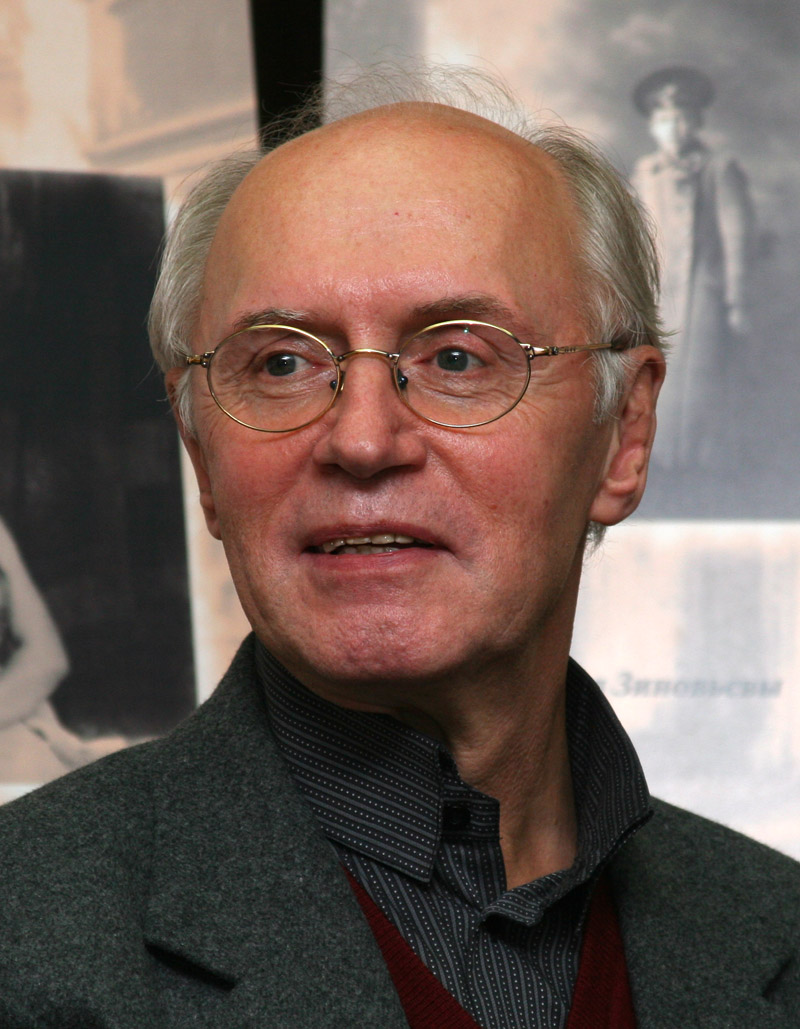
- Plotnikov in 2012
- Born: Boris Grigoryevich Plotnikov; April 2, 1949; Nevyansk, Sverdlovsk province, RSFSR, USSR (now Russia)
- Died: December 2, 2020 (aged 71); Moscow, Russia
- Resting place: Troyekurovskoye Cemetery
- Education: Ekaterinburg State Theater Institute; Ural State University (philological faculty)
- Occupations: Actor; theatre pedagogue
- Years active: 1970–2019

Boris Grigoryevich Plotnikov (Russian: Борис Григорьевич Плотников; 2 April 1949 – 2 December 2020) was a Soviet and Russian film actor.

His film debut was as Sotnikov in The Ascent, the acclaimed final film of Soviet director Larisa Shepitko. Plotnikov appeared in more than seventy feature films and television series.

== Biography ==
=== Early life ===
Boris Plotnikov was born on 2 April 1949, in the city of Nevyansk, Sverdlovsk Oblast. His father worked as a mechanic and his mother as an engineer-technologist. A few years later, the Plotnikov family moved to Novouralsk.

He graduated from school No. 57 in Novouralsk. He graduated from the Sverdlovsk Theater School (1970, the course of Yuri Zhigulsky) and the Philological Faculty of the Ural State University (1983).

=== Career ===
From 1970 to 1978, Plotnikov served in the Sverdlovsk Youth Theater.

He made his debut in 1976 in Larisa Shepitko's internationally renowned film The Ascent, which brought him all-union fame. He played the role of Dr. Bormental in the film Heart of a Dog by Vladimir Bortko.

In 1992, Plotnikov portrayed the prisoner Danilov in the mystery play of composer Alexey Rybnikov, Liturgy of Catechumens.

He appeared in the drama television series Empire Under Attack (2000), where he portrayed Grand Duke Sergei Alexandrovich. In the musical melodrama Cricket Behind the Fire, Plotnikov received the leading role of the Cricket, the keeper of the home.

He appeared in the role of Dr. Dmitri Ivanovich in the action movie Shadowboxing (2005) and in the crime drama Experts (2007), where he played a forensic medical worker.

In 2006, director Natalya Bondarchuk invited Plotnikov to play the Chief of the Gendarmes of the Secret Chancellery, Leonti Dubelt, in the drama Pushkin. The Last Duel.

Boris Plotnikov also participated in the military themed series Everyone has his Own War (2011), Snipers: Love under Sight (2012), Fighters, The Last Battle (2015).

=== Death ===
He died from COVID-19 during the COVID-19 pandemic in Russia.

== Filmography ==
- The Ascent (Russian: Восхождение, 1977) as Sotnikov
- Waiting for Premiere (Накануне премьеры, 1978) as Andrey Lagunin
- Pugachev (Емельян Пугачёв, 1978) as iconographer
- The Wild Hunt King Stach (Дикая охота короля Стаха, 1979) as Andrew Beloretskiy
- Forest (Лес, 1980) as Gennadiy Neschastlivtzev
- Two Сhapters from Family History (Две главы из семейной хроники, 1983) as Manfred
- Doubler Starts Working (Дублёр начинает действовать, 1984) as Kostin
- The Accusation (Обвинение, 1984) as Butenko
- Iona or Artist at Work (Иона, или Художник за работой, 1984, TV Movie) as Iona
- Transaction (Сделка, 1985) as Migel
- Peter the Great (Пётр Великий, 1986, TV Mini Series) as Tsarevich Alexei
- Lermontov (Лермонтов, 1986) as Yurii Petrovich Lermontov / Pushkin
- Sons Time (Время сыновей, 1986) as Aleksandr Kordin
- Gobseck (Гобсек, 1987) as Verbrest
- First Encounter - Last Encounter (Первая встреча, последняя встреча, 1988) as Kuklin, an inventor
- Cold Summer of 1953 (Холодное лето пятьдесят третьего, 1988) as Nikolai Starobogatov's son
- Heart of a Dog (Собачье сердце, 1988, TV Movie) as Dr. Ivan Arnoldovich Bormental
- Gambrinus (Гамбринус, 1990) as Misha
- Game of Death, or Outsider (Игра в смерть, или Посторонний, 1991) as Vlad Voiku
- Sukhovo-Kobylin Case (Дело Сухово-Кобылина, 1991, TV Movie) as Anton Chekhov
- Scaffold Walk (Прогулка по эшафоту, 1992) as Nekto
- A Host of White Princesses (Сонм белых княжён, 1992) as Nicholas II of Russia
- The Split (Раскол, 1993, TV Movie) as Peter Struve
- Empire under Attack (Империя под ударом, 2000, TV Mini Series) as Sergei Alexandrovich
- Avalanche (Лавина, 2001) as doctor
- Cricket Behind the Hearth (Сверчок за очагом, 2002) as Cricket
- Shadowboxing (Бой с тенью, 2005) as dr. Dmitri Ivanovich
- Pushkin: The Last Duel (Пушкин. Последняя дуэль, 2006) as Leontiy Dubelt
- Wolf Messing: Who Saw through Time (Вольф Мессинг: видевший сквозь время, 2009, TV Series) as Sigismund Freud
- Empire Wings (Крылья империи, 2017, TV Series) as Pyotr Kirsanov-Dvinsky
- Godunov (Годунов, 2018, TV Series) as Patriarch Job of Moscow
