= Mama Married =

- Russian: Мама вышла замуж
- Directed by: Vitaly Melnikov
- Written by: Yuri Klepikov
- Starring: Lyusyena Ovchinnikova; Oleg Yefremov; Nikolay Burlyaev; Larisa Burkova; Konstantin Tyagunov; Viktor Ilichyov
- Cinematography: Dmitriy Dolinin
- Edited by: Zinaida Sheineman
- Music by: Oleg Karavaychuk
- Production company: Lenfilm
- Release date: 1969
- Running time: 85 minute
- Country: Soviet Union
- Language: Russian

Mama Married (Russian: Мама вышла замуж, romanized: Mama vyshla zamuzh) is a 1969 Soviet drama film directed by Vitaly Melnikov.

== Plot ==
In the life of Zinaida, who single-handedly raised her son, Viktor appeared. However, Boris is not able to immediately understand that his mother also needs personal happiness. Zinaida works at a construction site as a plasterer, she and her son live in a new house on the outskirts of the city, which is being built up with new residential buildings. Boris works as a scooter driver-forwarder, delivers pastries and cookery to shops. Mother and son are generally friendly, the son treats the mother with patronizing humor. He reads a lot, seeks to somehow assert himself in life, having overcome his teenage complexes and envying his school friend, who easily and naturally meets girls on the dance floor. Suddenly, everything turns upside down in the life of a small family: the mother began to meet with Viktor, the grader driver. Their intentions are quite definite Viktor and Zinaida decided to get married, respectively, they plan to live in the same apartment, which is incredibly annoying and angering Boris, who believes that at their age it is ridiculous to talk about love.

== Cast ==
- Lyusyena Ovchinnikova as Zinaida
- Oleg Yefremov as Viktor
- Nikolay Burlyaev as Boris Golubev
- Larisa Burkova as Vera
- Konstantin Tyagunov as Dmitry Petrovich
- Viktor Ilichyov as Leonard
- Lyudmila Arinina as Aunt Katya
- Arkadi Trusov as uncle Vanya
- Kira Kreylis-Petrova as Lyudmila
- Yevgeniya Vetlova as girl in a cafe; friend of Leonard
