= Three Poplars in Plyushchikha =

- Directed by: Tatyana Lioznova
- Written by: Alexander Borschagovsky
- Starring: Tatiana Doronina; Oleg Efremov; Vyacheslav Shalevich; Alevtina Rumyantseva
- Cinematography: Pyotr Kataev
- Edited by: Kseniya Blinova
- Music by: Aleksandra Pakhmutova
- Production company: Gorky Film Studio
- Release date: 1968
- Running time: 79 minutes
- Country: Soviet Union
- Language: Russian

Three Poplars in Plyushchikha (Russian: Три тополя на Плющихе, romanized: Tri topolya na Plyushchikhe) is a 1968 romantic drama feature film directed by Tatyana Lioznova based on the story by Alexander Borschagovsky "Three Poplars in Shabolovka". The film was a box-office success, it was seen by 26 million people in the USSR.

== Plot ==
From a village to Moscow comes a married woman and mother of two children Nyura to sell home-made ham. And the first person she meets is an intelligent taxi driver Sasha, who must pick her up to her in-law; her husband's sister, who lives near the cafe "Three Poplars" at Plyushchikha street. This random meeting brings the strangers together and forces them to take a fresh look at their lives. But unfortunately, due to external circumstances continuation of this connection does not develop.

== Cast ==
- Tatiana Doronina as Nyura
- Oleg Yefremov as Sasha, taxi driver
- Hikmat Latypov as grandpa Sadyk
- Vyacheslav Shalevich as Grisha, Nyura's husband
- Valentina Telegina as Fedosiya Ivanovna
- Nikolay Smirnov as uncle Egor
- Alevtina Rumyantseva as Nina, Nyura's sister-in-law
- Viktor Sergachyov as Nina's fiancé
- Georgy Svetlani as shepherd
- Galya Belykh as Galya, Nyura's daughter (credited as Valya Belykh)
- Sergei Morozov as Sergei, Nyura's
- Yugenia Poplavskaja as girl in a taxi
- Yakov Lenz as old man in the queue

== Production ==
The story by Alexander Borschagovsky was called "Three Poplars at Shabolovka", and initially this was what the film was to be called. However Shabolovka had already become associated with television, and the motion picture was not about the TV industry. Therefore, director Tatyana Lioznova decided to change the name of the movie and the author gave his consent.

Field shooting of "Three Poplars at Plyuschikha" took place in the capital's streets and in the village Smedovo, Ozyory, Moscow Oblast.

Scenes in Nina's apartment were filmed not far from Plyuschikha in the apartment which has the address Rostov embankment, №5. At the request of the filmmakers, the tenants of the apartment left for their dacha, leaving it at full disposal of the crew.

Rustic interiors were filmed in Mosfilm pavilions and the "road" episodes - in a specially reserved diesel locomotive passenger car.

The car in which Sasha drives Nyura is GAZ M21 Volga which belongs to Mosfilm and was used for many of the studio's pictures. It is currently on display at the Mosfilm museum.

=== Interesting Facts ===
- Nikolai Rybnikov auditioned for the role of Sasha
- In 2011 Channel One Russia aired a colorized version of the film.
- The song Tenderness composed by Aleksandra Pakhmutova for the film became very popular and has been covered by many artists.

== Awards ==
- The film received an award from the International Catholic Organization for Cinema at the Mar del Plata International Film Festival.
- The actress Tatiana Doronina received an award for Best Actress at the All-Union Film Festival.
- For her acting in the film Tatiana Doronina was voted as best actress of 1968 by the readers of "Soviet Screen".

== References in other films ==
In the film Gentlemen of Fortune a criminal nicknamed Sad Sack says: "We are sitting here like three poplars in Plyushcikha!" – when the three prison escapees are sitting in an empty sports stadium. After this film, the phrase "Like three poplars in Plyushcikha" became a famous quote.
