= Another Man's Wife and a Husband Under the Bed (film) =

- Чужая жена и муж под кроватью
- Based on: Another Man's Wife and a Husband Under the Bed by Fyodor Dostoevsky
- Screenplay by: Vladimir Valutskiy
- Directed by: Vitaly Melnikov
- Starring: Oleg Tabakov; Oleg Yefremov; Marina Neyolova; Nikolai Burlyayev; Stanislav Sadalsky; Marina Shimanskaya
- Music by: Timur Kogan
- Country of origin: Soviet Union
- Original language: Russian

Production
- Running time: 64 minutes

Original release
- Release: 1984

Another Man's Wife and a Husband Under the Bed (Russian: Чужая жена и муж под кроватью, romanized: Chuzhaya zhena i muzh pod krovatyu) is a 1984 Soviet TV comedy film directed by Vitaly Melnikov. It is based on the 1848 story by Fyodor Dostoevsky of the same name.

== Plot ==
The film is a vaudevillian story about a solid, venerable, jealous husband (Oleg Tabakov) who is searching for his frivolous wife (Marina Shimanskaya). He winds up in someone else's apartment, and finds himself under the bed of an unknown woman (Marina Neyolova). He shares the hiding place with an unknown man (Stanislav Sadalsky), who is also there by accident.

== Cast ==
- Oleg Tabakov - Ivan Andreyevich
- Oleg Yefremov - Alexander Dem'yanovich
- Marina Neyolova - Lisa
- Nikolai Burlyayev - Tvorogov
- Stanislav Sadalsky - Unknown man under the bed
- Marina Shimanskaya - Glafira Petrovna
- Yuri Bogatyryov - Bobynitsyn
- Gali Abajdulov - an actor in the opera
- Yu Volyn - janitor
- Tatyana Zakharova - servant of Ivan Andreyevich and Glafira Petrovna
- Valentina Muradova - salon hostess
- Marina Razhdyestvenskaya - Yefrosinya, servant of Alexander and Lizanka Dem'yanovich
- Elena Rubin - opera actress
- Stanislav Sadalsky - an actor in the opera
- Leonid Tikhomirov - Serge
- Tatiana Tolubeeva - companion of Serge

== Crew ==
- Screenplay - Vladimir Valutskiy
- Director - Vitaly Melnikov
- Director of photography - Yuri Veksler
- Production design - Isaac Kaplan
- Music - Timur Kogan
- Sound engineer - Asya Zvereva
- Symphony Orchestra of the Leningrad State Small Opera Theatre
  Conductor - Timur Kogan
- Editors - Haley Elken, Palechek Constantine
- Director group - Vladimir Korolev, Vladimir Sitnik, V. Belov, Buzyan T., M. Ivanov
- Operator - A. Nasyrov
- Installation - Zenaida Scheunemann
- Makeup - O. Smirnova
- Costumes - Irina Kaverzinoy
- Combined shooting:
  operator - A. Torgovkin
  Painter - Victor Okovity
- Decorators - T. Voronkov
- Assistant costume designer - Vladimir Volyn
- Operator group - Alexander Korneev, A. Jankowski
- Master prop - S. Gorodnichenko
- Master light - SE Stepanov
- Administrative unit - A. N., L. Petrov
- The film is based on the film Shostka production association "Svema."

== Filming ==
According to Vitaly Melnikov, everyone had fun making the movie. The only difficulty was getting from under the antique bed which could've collapsed anytime, so Stanislav Sadalsky had to stay down there. He was then joined by Oleg Tabakov, and during pauses both of them simply fell asleep. Yuri Bogatyryov had only one free day, so he invented his costume and changed closes on the way from Moscow to Leningrad, thus upon arrival everyone witnessed a 19th-century nobleman casually walking out of a Soviet train.

== Critics ==
Writer Yevgeni Popov called the original story "an amusingly talented, funny, light, playful thing" written by a "then-lad Dostoevsky", and noted that a significant part of future absurdists such as Daniil Kharms or Nikolay Oleynikov owed him. Popov also recommended to watch the movie, highlighting the acting and Oleg Yefremov's work in particular. "Usually such a severe man flexing his jaw muscles, here he appears as an elderly relaxed gentleman".
