= Nameless Star =

- Written by: Aleksander Khmelik
- Directed by: Mikhail Kozakov
- Starring: Anastasiya Vertinskaya; Igor Kostolevsky; Mikhail Kozakov
- Narrated by: Mikhail Kozakov
- Music by: Edison Denisov
- Country of origin: Soviet Union
- Original language: Russian

Production
- Cinematography: Vladimir Ivanov
- Editor: Lyudmila Chuso
- Running time: 129 min.
- Production company: Sverdlovsk Film Studio

Original release
- Release: 1979

The Nameless Star (Russian: Безымянная звезда, romanized: Bezymyannaya zvezda) is a 1979 Soviet romantic comedy television film directed by Mikhail Kozakov and based on the play The Star Without a Name by Mihail Sebastian.

== Plot ==
The setting is a provincial town in Romania, some time in the 1930s. It is a quiet town where all the residents know each other and the passage of the "Bucharest-Sinaia" express train is considered a major event. The express train never stops: it passes through town once in the morning on the way to Sinaia, and once during the evening on the way back to Bucharest. The residents of the town regularly congregate at the train station to watch the express pass and to speculate about the faraway lives of the passengers.

One evening, the owner of the town's department store Mr. Pascu returns from Bucharest with various specialty orders for the residents. One of the orders is clothing for Mr. Ispas, the head of the train station. Another order is a rare book for Mr. Miroiu, the town's astronomy teacher. Pascu confides to Ispas that Miroiu's book is worth 22,000 lei. When Pascu delivers the order to Miroiu, it turns out that he confused Miroiu's and Ispas' packages. Miroiu rushes to the train station, as Ispas must remain there until the evening "Bucharest-Sinaia" express passes. They exchange packages, and Miroiu begins leafing through his new book in the station.

The "Bucharest-Sinaia" express arrives and stops at the station, to Ispas' surprise. The conductor calls Ispas on board to assist him with a stowaway. The stowaway is a young woman in an expensive dress who has no ticket, documents, or money. Ispas and the conductor manage to trick the woman (Mona) off of the train and into the station, and the train departs. Miroiu is heart-struck by Mona. Mona is non-cooperative with Ispas when he attempts to process her as a stowaway. Miroiu offers to house Mona for the night (himself staying at a friend's house) and to return her for processing in the morning, to which Mona reluctantly agrees. Ispas is supportive of the idea, as he wants Mona gone before his wife arrives and misunderstands the situation. Mona and Miroiu leave the station just before Mrs. Ispas arrives. She forces her husband to explain what happened after smelling Mona's perfume in the station office.

Miroiu shows Mona the town as he escorts her. Mona is unimpressed by the provincial nature of the town and Miroiu's meager home. Meanwhile, Mrs. Ispas runs into Mlle. Cucu (a colleague of Miroiu) at the theater and tells her about the events at the train station. Cucu is upset by the news (it's implied that she is in love with Miroiu). Cucu finds Miroiu's neighbour Mr. Udrea and convinces him to escort her to Miroiu's home, without revealing that it's because she wants to see the mystery woman. When Cucu and Udrea arrive at Miroiu's home, Miroiu has Mona hide in the bathroom. Cucu interrogates Miroiu. Unable to reveal her true feelings when asked why, Cucu instead says that she wants to know where Miroiu acquired 22,000 lei to purchase his new book. Cucu accidentally finds Mona's gloves and runs away in tears. Udrea follows Cucu to escort her home, but not before Miroiu asks him to return afterwards.

Mona overheard everything from the bathroom and asks to see the book. Miroiu accepts because Mona is in town for only one night. The book is a 17th-century astronomical treatise, which Miroiu was able to afford by living an intensely frugal lifestyle. Miroiu purchased the book because he believes that he has discovered a new star, and this book contains the only remaining star chart which he has not checked to verify that this is an original discovery. Mona asks to see the star, but Miroiu explains that it's not visible: he discovered it through mathematical reasoning. Mona doubts him, so Miroiu attempts to show her where the star is in the sky from his balcony, but his aggressive explanation frightens her and she retreats back inside the house.

Udrea returns and Miroiu introduces him. Udrea is the town music teacher and a hobbyist composer. He has written a symphony which he wants to perform, but it requires an English horn which costs 4,500 lei and which the town does not have. At Mona's request, Udrea performs a short version of his symphony using his voice. Miroiu and Udrea attempt to depart to Udrea's house for the night, but Mona requests that Miroiu stay. Mona asks Miroiu to show her his star again. This time, she is awed by his knowledge of astronomy and the beauty of the stars. Miroiu tells Mona that he has not yet chosen a name for his star. They kiss on the balcony and spend the night together.

The next morning, Mona tells Miroiu that she intends to stay with him. Miroiu departs to purchase a new dress for her. While he is away, a man named Grig arrives at his house and the details of Mona's life are filled in. Mona has been Grig's lover for three years, though she is more like his pet. The previous night, they were playing roulette at the casino in Sinaia. Grig blamed Mona for his poor luck and sent her away to their hotel room. Instead, Mona attempted to run away. Grig tracked her down to Miroiu's house and has arrived to take her home.

Miroiu returns from the store with a dress. Grig falsely introduces himself as Mona's brother, then sends Miroiu away to exchange the dress, telling him that Mona doesn't like it but is too polite to say so. After Miroiu leaves, Grig insults Miroiu, the town, and the townspeople. Mlle. Cucu arrives, and Grig concentrates his ire on her, using her as a symbol of what Mona will become if she stays. As Cucu attempts to leave, Mona asks her for advice. Hurt, Cucu advises her to leave with Grig and then departs. Mona tells Grig that she doesn't have the strength to resist him. In a last, desperate attempt, Mona asks Grig to abandon her; Grig refuses.

Mr. Udrea arrives. Udrea and Grig go outside to discuss Udrea's symphony after Mona agrees to go with Grig if he pays for Udrea's English horn. When Miroiu returns, Mona tells him that she needs to leave. Miroiu presses her about when she'll return, but her answers are evasive. Mona suggests that he name his star after her, because just like his star, he won't see her, but he'll know that she exists.

Mona departs with Grig. Udrea returns to tell Miroiu that Grig gave him 5,000 lei to buy an English horn. When Miroiu tells Udrea what happened, Udrea replies that he doesn't think Mona will be back. Miroiu says that he suspected something like this would happen, explaining by quoting an astronomical law which he had previously quoted to Mona: "No star may deviate from its course".

== Cast ==
- Igor Kostolevsky - Marin Miroiu
- Anastasiya Vertinskaya - Mona
- Mikhail Kozakov - Grig / Narrator
- Svetlana Kryuchkova - Mlle. Cucu
- Grigory Lyampe - Mr. Udrea
- Ilya Rutberg - Mr. Pascu, the owner of the department store
- Mikhail Svetin - Mr. Ispas
- Alla Budnitskaya - Mrs. Ispas, the wife of the station's chief (voiced by another actress)
- Irina Savina - Eleonora Zamfirescu, a local schoolgirl
- Alexander Pyatkov - Joaquim, assistant to the head of the station (voiced by Rogvold Sukhoverko)
- Evgeny Tilicheev - Conductor
