= Charlotte's Necklace =

1984 Soviet television film

- Written by: Arthur Makarov; Anatoly Romov
- Directed by: Yevgeny Tatarsky
- Starring: Kirill Lavrov; Vadim Ledogorov; Yury Kuznetsov
- Music by: Alexander Zhurbin
- Country of origin: Soviet Union
- Original language: Russian

Production
- Producer: Igor Vizgin
- Cinematography: Yuri Veksler
- Editor: Tamara Guseva
- Running time: 209 min.
- Production companies: Lenfilm; Studio Ekran

Original release
- Release: 17 December 1984

Charlotte's Necklace (Russian: Колье Шарлотты, romanized: Kol'e Sharlotty) is a 1984 Soviet detective film directed by Yevgeny Tatarsky. Screen version of the novel by Anatoly Romov Customs Inspection.

== Plot ==
Officers of KGB, experienced Colonel Seryogin and a young agent Pavlov, are investigating the murder of a fartsovshchik Viktor Korablyov. The investigation brings them to the trail of a criminal group that transports valuable works of jewelry abroad.

A duel with experienced and cunning criminals turns out to be a serious test for security officers. It turns out that the murder of Korablev is associated with an attempt to secretly export the famous antique piece known as the Charlotte Necklace abroad.

== Cast ==
- Kirill Lavrov as KGB Colonel Vladimir Seryogin
- Vadim Ledogorov as Anton Pavlov
- Yury Kuznetsov as Korchyonov, repeat offender
- Igor Yankovsky as Viktor Korablyov
- Valentina Voilkova as Svetlana, Viktor's sister
- Georgy Martirosyan as Stas Sedov
- Yelena Solovey as Maria Grigorievna Zenova
- Vladimir Soshalsky as Gubchenko
- Yevgeny Kindinov as Severtsev
- Lev Prygunov as Pavel Parin, ship's doctor
- Georgy Drozd as Yakov Gursky, ship's doctor
- Zhanna Prokhorenko as hotel attendant
- Vladimir Valutsky as Pachinski
- Sergey Vinogradov as General Burylin

== See also ==
- Golden Mine (1977)
