= Vitaly Melnikov (film director) =

Russian film director (1928–2022)

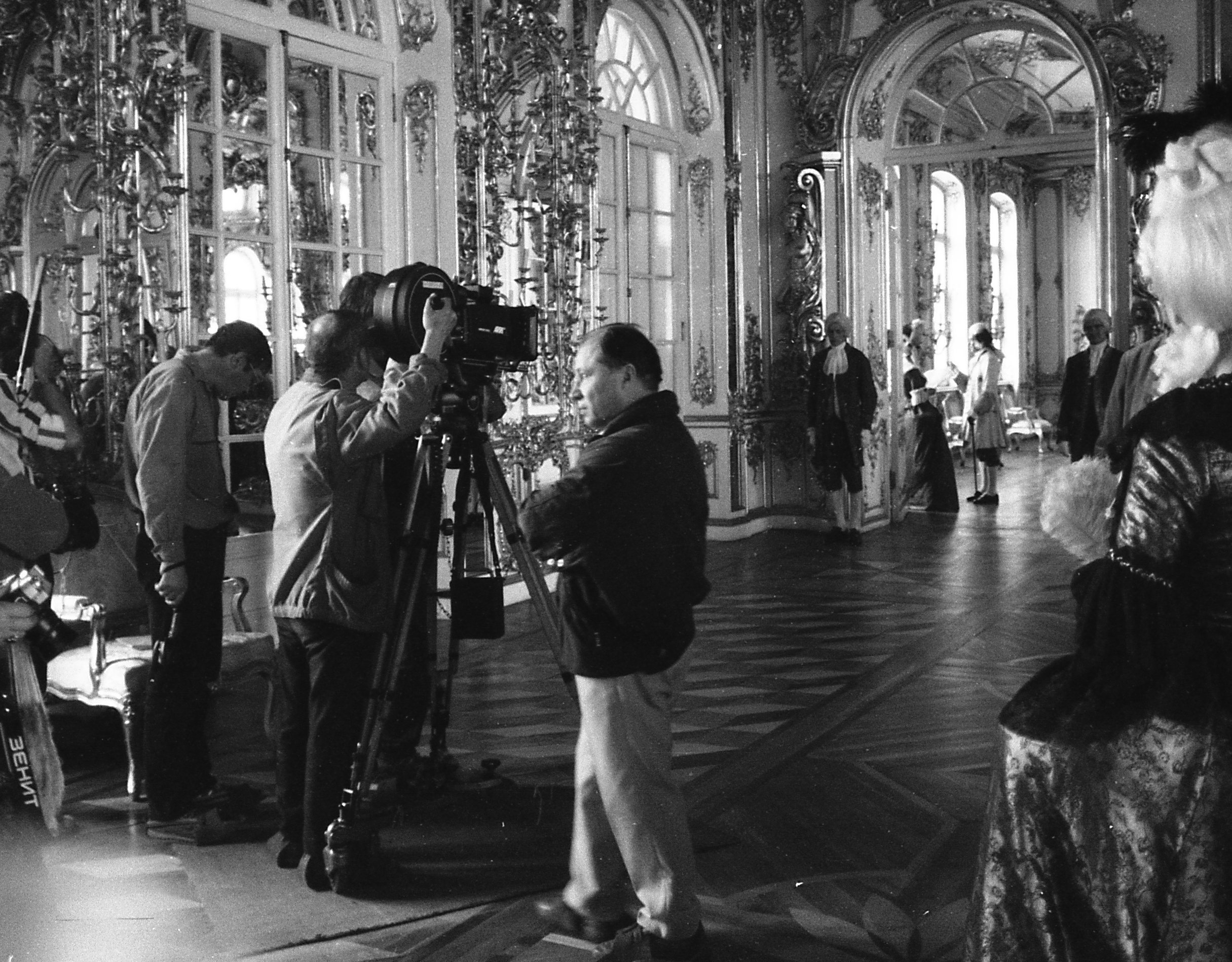
- Born: Vitaly Vyacheslavovich Melnikov; 1 May 1928; Svobodny, Far Eastern Krai, RSFSR, Soviet Union
- Died: 21 March 2022 (aged 93); Saint Petersburg, Russia
- Occupations: Film director, screenwriter
- Years active: 1959–2012

Vitaly Vyacheslavovich Melnikov (Russian: Виталий Вячеславович Мельников; 1 May 1928 – 21 March 2022) was a Soviet and Russian film director and screenwriter. He was named People's Artist of the RSFSR in 1987 and awarded Order of Honour in 2002 and IV Class Order "For Merit to the Fatherland" in 2010. He was also a member of the Russian Academy of Cinema Arts and Sciences and was awarded the special Nika Award in 2016 "For outstanding contribution to national cinema".

== Biography ==
Vitaly Melnikov was born at the maternity hospital of the Svobodny town (modern-day Svobodny, Amur Oblast of Russia), although his birthplace was written down as Mazanovo village where his parents lived at the moment. His maternal grandfather Danilo Fomich Trapeznikov, a peasant from the Tobolsk Governorate, served at the Far East during the Russo-Japanese War and enjoyed the area so much that he chose to stay there; during the Russian Civil War he was mobilized by the White Army, and during the 1930s he was arrested and executed "for collaboration with Alexander Kolchak". Vitaly's mother Avgusta Danilovna Melnikova was a teacher.

His paternal grandparents, Vladimir and Eudokia, lived at the Far East near gold mines. His father Vyacheslav Vladimirovich Melnikov was a forester, regularly moving with the family "from one wilderness to another". Vitaly grew up in Blagoveshchensk. During the Great Purge his father was also arrested, declared an enemy of the people and executed. His mother was told that her husband had been sentenced to 10 years in prison and suggested to leave the Far East, so she moved in with her relatives in Omsk, and later to a village near Khanty-Mansiysk in Western Siberia, where Vitaly finished secondary school. He also got addicted to cinema during that time.

In 1947 he moved to Moscow and entered director's courses at VGIK led by Sergei Yutkevich. He graduated in 1952 and started making documentary movies at Lennauchfilm (15 movies total). From 1963 on he worked at Lenfilm. His comedy movie Seven Brides of Gefreiter Zbruev (1970), based on the screenplay by Vladimir Valutsky, became the only comedy released in 1971 as well as one of the leaders of the Soviet box office (11th place), seen by 31.2 million people. Together they produced four movies in total, including another popular comedy The Head of Chukotka (1966) and a TV adaptation of Fyodor Dostoevsky's story Another Man’s Wife and a Husband Under the Bed (1984).

His social drama Mother Got Married (1969) based on Yuri Klepikov's screenplay had been postponed for a long time and was finally released during the 1970s as a TV movie, while the psychological drama September Vacation (1979) adapted from Alexander Vampilov's play Duck Hunting was banned for 8 years and released only in 1987. Prior to that he directed an adaptation of another Vampilov's play The Elder Son (1976) which turned into one of his most popular movies since.

In 1990 Melnikov turned to the Russian history, directing the so-called Empire. The Beginning (or Empire. The XVIII Century) trilogy: The Royal Hunt dedicated to the times of Catherine the Great, Tsarevich Alexei about Alexei Petrovich, Tsarevich of Russia and Poor Poor Paul about Paul I of Russia, both based on Dmitry Merezhkovsky's writings. The films received various national awards and nominations, including a number of Nika Awards.

Melnikov and his wife, Tamara Aleksandrovna Melnikova, lived together for over 60 years. They have two daughters, Irina and Olga.

Melnikov died in Saint Petersburg on 21 March 2022 at the age of 93.

== Filmography ==
| Year | Title | Original title | | |
| Year | Title | Original title | Director | Screenwriter |
|---|---|---|---|---|
| 1963 | Happiness Day | День счастья | second unit director | |
| 1964 | Berbos Visiting Bobik | Барбос в гостях у Бобика | ✓ | |
| 1966 | Chief of Chukotka | Начальник Чукотки | ✓ | |
| 1969 | Mama Married | Мама вышла замуж | ✓ | |
| 1970 | The Seven Brides of Lance-Corporal Zbruyev | Семь невест ефрейтора Збруева | ✓ | |
| 1972 | Hello and Goodbye | Здравствуй и прощай | ✓ | |
| 1974 | Ksenia, Fedor's Beloved Wife | Ксения, любимая жена Фёдора | ✓ | |
| 1976 | The Elder Son | Старший сын | ✓ | ✓ |
| 1977 | Marriage | Женитьба | ✓ | ✓ |
| 1979 | September Vacation | Отпуск в сентябре | ✓ | ✓ |
| 1981 | Two Lines in Small Font | Две строчки мелким шрифтом | ✓ | ✓ |
| 1983 | Phenomenon | Уникум | ✓ | ✓ |
| 1984 | Another Man’s Wife and a Husband Under the Bed | Чужая жена и муж под кроватью | ✓ | |
| 1985 | To Marry a Captain | Выйти замуж за капитана | ✓ | |
| 1987 | First Encounter - Last Encounter | Первая встреча, последняя встреча | ✓ | |
| 1990 | The Royal Hunt | Царская охота | ✓ | |
| 1991 | Chicha | Чича | ✓ | |
| 1994 | Varyony's Last Case | Последнее дело Варёного | ✓ | |
| 1997 | Tsarevich Alexei | Царевич Алексей | ✓ | ✓ |
| 2000 | The Garden Was Full of Moon | Луной был полон сад | ✓ | |
| 2003 | Poor Poor Paul | Бедный, бедный Павел | ✓ | ✓ |
| 2007 | Agitbrigade "Beat the Enemy!" | Агитбригада «Бей врага!» | ✓ | ✓ |
| 2012 | The Admirer | Поклонница | ✓ | ✓ |

== Literature ==
Vitaly Melnikov (2011). Cinema. Life. — St. Petersburg: BXV-Peterburg, 416 pages ISBN 978-5-9775-0669-4 (Memoirs)
