= If to Believe Lopotukhin... =

- Written by: Aleksandr Khmelik
- Directed by: Mikhail Kozakov
- Starring: Grisha Evseev: Leonid Bronevoy; Svetlana Kryuchkova; Boryslav Brondukov
- Music by: Georgy Garanian
- Country of origin: Soviet Union
- Original language: Russian

Production
- Cinematography: Alexander Knyazhinsky
- Editor: N. Kokaryova
- Running time: 126 minutes
- Production company: Studio Ekran

Original release
- Release: 1983

If We Believe Lopotukhin... (Russian: Если верить Лопотухину…, romanized: Esli verit Lopotukhinu...) is a 1983 Soviet two-part science fiction-comedy film directed by Mikhail Kozakov.

== Plot ==
Vasya Lopotukhin who comes late for the mathematics exam says that he met with a representative of extraterrestrial civilization, or, more simply, a humanoid who flew on a ZAZ Zaporozhets without wheels and is very similar to the school headmaster, only he also wore a helmet. Vasya is forced to renounce his stories about the stranger at the general school meeting, but whether to believe him or not, each of the participants in this story decides for himself.

== Cast ==
- Grisha Evseev — Vasya Lopotukhin
- Leonid Bronevoy — Yuri Leonidovich, school director / humanoid
- Svetlana Kryuchkova — Alla Konstantinovna, teacher of mathematics
- Boryslav Brondukov — Uncle Kolya
- Vitaly Leonov (Stepan Ivanovich) and Ivan Ufimtsev (Ivan Stepanovich) — Friends of Uncle Kolya
- Vasya Arkanov — Shafirov
- Natasha Zbrueva — Malakhova
- Anton Narkevich — Pavlov
- Maxim Kondratiev — Petrov
- Maksim Shirokov — Poluektov
