= Demidovs =

1983 Soviet drama film

- Russian: Демидовы
- Directed by: Yaropolk Lapshin
- Written by: Vladimir Akimov; Eduard Volodarskiy
- Starring: Yevgeniy Yevstigneyev; Vadim Spiridonov; Aleksandr Lazarev; Leonid Kuravlyov; Mikhail Kozakov
- Cinematography: Anatoliy Lesnikov
- Music by: Yuriy Levitin
- Release date: 1983
- Running time: 156 minute
- Country: Soviet Union
- Language: Russian

Demidovs (Russian: Демидовы) is a 1983 Soviet biographical drama film directed by Yaropolk Lapshin.

== Plot ==
The first series shows the relationship of the Demidovs with Peter the Great. Akinfiy Demidov in a short time was able to establish the production of pig iron and cannons, thanks to which Russia won a number of significant victories. In the second series, Akinfiy becomes the master in the Urals and was able to oppose the ruler Biron, distinguished by cruelty and cunning.

== Cast ==
- Yevgeniy Yevstigneyev as Nikita Antufiev-Demidov
- Vadim Spiridonov as Akinfiy Demidov
- Aleksandr Lazarev as Petr I
- Leonid Kuravlyov as Menshikov
- Mikhail Kozakov as Biron
- Tatyana Tashkova as Marya
- Lyubov Polekhina as Yevdokiya Korobkova-Demidova
- Lyudmila Chursina as Yekaterina I
- Lidiya Fedoseeva-Shukshina as Anna Ioannovna
- Valeriy Zolotukhin as Panteley
