= Hello and Goodbye (1972 film) =

Romantic comedy film by Vitaliy Melnikov

- Russian: Здравствуй и прощай
- Directed by: Vitaliy Melnikov
- Written by: Viktor Merezhko
- Starring: Lyudmila Zaytseva; Oleg Efremov; Mikhail Kononov; Aleksandr Demyanenko; Natalya Gundareva
- Cinematography: Yuri Veksler
- Music by: Vladlen Chistyakov
- Release date: 1972
- Running time: 95 minute
- Country: Soviet Union
- Language: Russian

Hello and Goodbye (Russian: Здравствуй и прощай) is a 1972 Soviet romantic comedy film directed by Vitaliy Melnikov.

The film tells about a woman who leaves her husband, having left for the city in search of the meaning of life. She meets a policeman whom she has fallen in love with and suddenly her husband returns.

== Plot ==
A year ago, the village carpenter Mitka left his wife Shura and their three children to seek "the meaning of life" in the city. Now, he suddenly reappears, recounting his life in the city and his job at a factory. However, his homecoming is met with a cold reception; Shura has not forgiven him, and their children are wary. Ultimately, Mitka leaves again. Meanwhile, a new, single police officer, Burov, arrives in the village and becomes fond of Shura. At the same time, a fellow villager, Rakov, tries to introduce Shura to his widowed brother, a father of three. Even Vasya, the village driver, who guards his bachelor status closely, starts showing interest in Shura after a quarrel with his partner, Nadya. Shura mischievously sets up a meeting with all three suitors by the river, telling them to signal their arrival by making a cuckoo sound. Eventually, Rakov, his brother, Burov, and Vasya all meet each other among the reeds, realizing that Shura has playfully tricked them. Later, Burov attends an Indian film at the village club, where Shura is also watching. Afterward, as they walk home together, Burov confesses his feelings, and Shura reciprocates. She returns home at dawn, finding her children waiting on the doorstep.

Shura’s life takes a new turn as she falls in love with Burov, who intends to marry her. Openly, she brings him breakfast at work and takes his laundry to wash. However, Mitka unexpectedly returns once more, learning of her relationship with Burov. He confronts Burov, claiming that their relationship threatens the "family unit." Later, Burov tells Shura he promised Mitka he would no longer see her. Mitka takes a vacation from the factory and then resigns, but Shura tells him directly that she does not love him. Eventually, Mitka leaves for the city again. In autumn, as the village prepares for the heating season, Burov inspects homes for fire safety and stops briefly at Shura’s house, exchanging a few words. Shura and her children begin mixing clay for their stove, singing together. Shura and Burov exchange a final, sorrowful look, each aware of the unfulfilled possibility between them.

== Cast ==
- Lyudmila Zaytseva as Aleksandra
- Oleg Efremov as Grigori Burov
- Mikhail Kononov as Mitya, Aleksandra's husband
- Aleksandr Demyanenko
- Natalya Gundareva
- Viktor Pavlov
- Boryslav Brondukov
- Tanya Doronina
- Sasha Vedernikov
- Zhanna Blinova
