= Two People in One Life and a Dog =

- Directed by: Andrey Zaytsev
- Written by: Andrey Zaytsev
- Produced by: Elena Gromova; Andrey Zaytsev
- Starring: Svetlana Kryuchkova; Aleksandr Adabashyan; Polina Gukhman; Aleksandr Zamurayev; Lyudmila Motornaya; Makr Gaass; Anna Ukolova
- Cinematography: Irina Uralskaya
- Edited by: Andrey Zaytsev
- Production company: September Film Studio
- Distributed by: SB Film
- Release date: October 16, 2025 (Russia)
- Running time: 109 minutes
- Country: Russia
- Language: Russian
- Budget: ₽98 million
- Box office: ₽3.1 million

Two People in One Life and a Dog (Russian: Двое в одной жизни, не считая собаки, romanized: Dvoe v odnoy zhizni, ne schitaya sobaki) is a 2025 Russian romantic drama film written, produced, and directed by Andrey Zaytsev. It stars Svetlana Kryuchkova and Aleksandr Adabashyan.

This film was theatrically released on October 16, 2025.

== Plot ==
The film tells the story of an intelligent elderly couple living in St. Petersburg, separated from their children. Despite loneliness and a difficult past, they have managed to maintain their warmth, wisdom, patience, and forgiveness.

== Cast ==
- Svetlana Kryuchkova as Lyudmila Pavlovna
- Aleksandr Adabashyan as Igor Nikolayevich
- Polina Gukhman as Polina
- Aleksandr Zamurayev as Polina's father
- Lyudmila Motornaya as Polina's mother
- Makr Gaass as Polina's boyfriend
- Anna Ukolova
- Dmitry Blokhin as a fraudster
- Ilya Del as a student

== Production ==
Filming took place in the Saint Petersburg.

== Release ==
The film competed in the main competition of the 48th Moscow International Film Festival (Audience Award). The film was released in Russia on October 16, 2025, by SB Film.
