= The Elder Son (1976 film) =

- Written by: Vitaly Melnikov; Alexander Vampilov
- Directed by: Vitaly Melnikov
- Starring: Yevgeny Leonov; Natalia Egorova; Vladimir Izotov; Nikolai Karachentsov; Mikhail Boyarsky
- Country of origin: Soviet Union
- Original language: Russian

Production
- Cinematography: Yuri Veksler
- Editor: Zinaida Shejneman
- Running time: 140 minutes
- Production company: Lenfilm

Original release
- Release: 20 May 1976

The Elder Son (Russian: Старший сын, romanized: Starshiy syn) is a 1976 Soviet two-part television drama film directed by Vitaly Melnikov based on the eponymous play by Alexander Vampilov.

The film was commissioned by the USSR State Committee for Television and Radio. The shooting took place in a suburb of Leningrad, near Rzhevka station.

== Synopsis ==
Two hapless young men – student Vladimir Busygin and his chance acquaintance Semyon Sevostyanov, nicknamed Silva – escort two girls they just met in a cafe back home to the suburbs in the hopes of advancing their relations. After being rejected, they run back to the station, but miss the last train. Finding themselves stranded on a cold autumn night in a strange town, they try to convince someone to let them sleep over, but to no avail. In an apartment window, they witness a father and son having a heated quarrel. Having overheard the conversation, Vladimir conceives an outrageous plan: he decides to introduce himself as the man's illegitimate son, and so solve the problem of dinner and a place to sleep.

Andrei Grigorievich Sarafanov is a clarinetist who performs at a dance club and at a cinema before screenings. He is a kind-hearted man who has brought up two children without his wife, and is persuaded that the unexpected guest is his illegitimate son. His reaction is so sincere and touching that Vladimir's conscience is awakened. He has been raised without a father, and Sarafanov's kindliness prompts unexpectedly reciprocal feelings. He is unable to respond to such trust with deceit, and realizes that he is not indifferent to the problems of the family (of which he had previously been quite unaware).

Sarafanov's "younger" (and actual) son, Vassenka, is passionately but unrequitedly in love with a neighbor named Natalia. Silva now complicates this already difficult relationship by beginning (merely for his own amusement, and without serious intent) to court Natalia behind Vassenka's back – with some success. Meanwhile, Vladimir falls in love with Sarafanov's daughter Nina – but because he is supposedly her "brother" he cannot openly admit this and suffers in silence, becoming increasingly jealous of Nina's fiancé, an aviation radio engineer.

Unable to keep up the pretence, Vladimir eventually confesses his deceit to Nina, who has also been experiencing bafflingly unsisterly feelings towards her new "brother." They discuss how they should reveal the truth to Sarafanov. At this point Silva turns up: Vassenka, finding him in Natalia's home, had tried to set fire to the house, in a fit of jealousy, by throwing a box of lit matches through the window. Silva and Vladimir quarrel, and Silva reports the true facts of the case to Sarafanov: Vladimir is forced to admit his deceit. However, Sarafanov forgives the deception, having now developed sincere feelings towards his "eldest son": "You are all my children, because I love you. Whether I am bad or good, I love you. And this is the most important thing."

== Cast ==
- Yevgeny Leonov as head of the family Andrei Grigorievich Sarafanov
- Natalia Egorova as his daughter Nina
- Vladimir Izotov as his son Vassenka, known as Vasya
- Nikolai Karachentsov as student Vladimir Busygin
- Mikhail Boyarsky as Busygin's friend Simon Sevostyanov, nicknamed Silva
- Svetlana Kryuchkova as Sarafanov's neighbor Natalia Makarska
- Nikolai Nikolsky as Nina's fiancé, Mikhail Kudimov
- Igor Gorbachyov as neighbor in the window

== Awards ==
- 1976 – Intervision Prize
- 1976 – Prize for Best Screenplay in the section of dramatic works at the XIII International Festival of TV films in Prague.
