= Oleg Yefremov =

Soviet and Russian actor and producer (1927–2000)

- Олег Ефремов
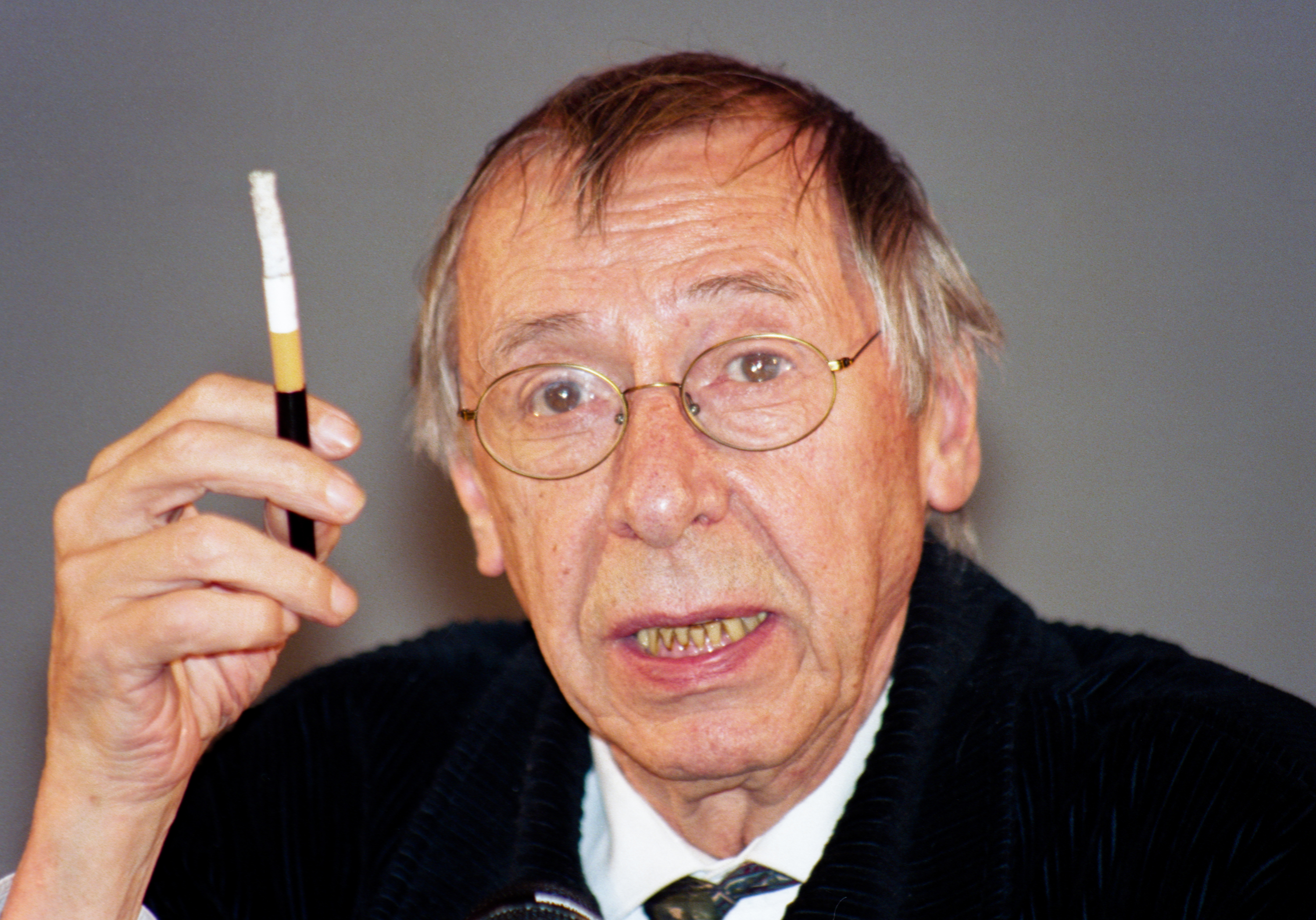
- Yefremov in 1998
- Born: Oleg Nikolayevich Yefremov; 1 October 1927; Moscow, Russian SFSR, Soviet Union
- Died: 24 May 2000 (aged 72); Moscow, Russia
- Resting place: Novodevichy Cemetery, Moscow
- Education: Moscow Art Theater School
- Occupations: Actor, theater director, teacher
- Years active: 1949–2000
- Spouse(s): Lilia Tolmacheva and Alla Pokrovskaya
- Children: 2, including Mikhail

Oleg Nikolayevich Yefremov (Russian: Оле́г Никола́евич Ефре́мов; 1 October 1927 – 24 May 2000) was a Soviet and Russian actor. He was a producer at the Moscow Art Theatre. He received the titles People's Artist of the USSR (1976) and Hero of Socialist Labour (1987).

In 1949, he graduated from the Moscow Art Theatre School and became an actor and later a producer of the Central Children Theater, started teaching at School-Studio by himself.

Oleg Yefremov debuted as a film actor in the melodrama The First Echelon in 1955. Since then he was regularly acting in films, and his every appearance on screen turned to be a real event for millions of spectators. Some of his most notable roles were in the films The Alive and the Dead (1964), the melodrama Three Poplars in Plyushchikha (1967), Shine, Shine, My Star (1969), comedies Aybolit-66 (1966), and Beware of the Car (1966).

In 1956, having gathered around himself students and graduates of the School-Studio, both his coevals and pupils, Oleg Yefremov organized the Studio of Young Actors (subsequently — the Moscow famous Sovremennik Theatre and became its first director. Since 1970, he has been an actor and a Chief Producer of the Moscow Art Theatre named after Maxim Gorky. In 1976 the actor became a Professor of Moscow Art Theatre School-Studio.

== Biography ==
=== Early life ===
Oleg Nikolayevich Yefremov was born on 1 October 1927 in Moscow. His father was Nikolai Ivanovich Yefremov, his mother Anna Dmitrievna Efremova.

He grew up in a large communal apartment on the Arbat Street. His father served as an accountant in the Gulag system, and the future actor spent a part of his adolescence in the Vorkutlag camps, where he became closely acquainted with the criminal world.

In childhood, Yefremov attended a drama club at the House of Pioneers.

=== Theatre ===
He graduated from the School of the Moscow Art Theatre School in 1949.

From 1949 to 1956, Yefremov worked at the Central Children's Theater, where he played more than 20 roles, including Ivan ("Humpbacked Horse"), Coviel ("The Philistine in the Nobility"), Kostya Poletayev ("Pages of Life"), Alexey ( "In a good time!"). There he also made his debut as a director of the production of vaudeville "Dimka the Invisible" (1955).

In 1956, Oleg Yefremov organized the "Young Actors Studio" (later - the Moscow Theater "Sovremennik") and became the artistic director of the theater. On the stage of "Contemporary" he played in the performances "Forever Living" (Boris), "Destination" (Lyamin), "Nobody" (Vincenzo De Pretore). Among his directorial works are Five Evenings by Alexander Volodin, Eduard Rostan's Cyrano de Bergerac, Leonid Zorin's Decembrists trilogy, Alexander Svobin's Narodovoltsy, Mikhail Shatrov's Bolsheviks, Victor Rozov's Traditional Collection, Chekhov.

In 1970, Yefremov became the chief director of the Moscow Art Theater. After the division of the troupe in 1987 - the main stage director of the Moscow Art Theatre. For thirty years in the Art Theater, he has staged more than 40 performances and himself played in 14 of them. Among his works - "Dulcinea Tobosskaya" (the role of Don Luis), "Copper Grandmother" (Pushkin's role), "Duck hunting" (Zilov's role), "Party Committee Meeting" (Potapov's role), "Boris Godunov" (the title role). He staged Anton Chekhov's plays: "Ivanov" (1976), "The Seagull" (1980), "Uncle Vanya" (1985), "The Cherry Orchard" (1989), "The Three Sisters" (1997). His last, unfinished, directorial work was "Cyrano de Bergerac".

=== Film ===
Oleg Yefremov played about 70 roles in feature and television films, the most famous of which are: The First Echelon by Mikhail Kalatozov, The Soldiers were Advancing by Leonid Trauberg, The Alive and the Dead by Alexander Stolper, Someone Is Ringing, Open the Door by Alexander Mitta, Beware of the Car by Eldar Ryazanov, Three Poplars in Plyushchikha by Tatyana Lioznova and Battalions ask for Fire by Vladimir Chebotarev and Alexander Bogolyubov.

=== Other activities ===
Since 1949, Oleg Yefremov taught acting in the Moscow Art Theater School-Studio, produced several acting and director's courses, was a professor and head of the acting department.

He was one of the founders and the first secretary of the board of the Union of Theatre Workers of the Russian Federation.

=== Death ===
Oleg Yefremov died on 24 May 2000 in Moscow. He was buried at the Novodevichy Cemetery.

== Personal life ==
Oleg Yefremov was married to Sovremennik Theatre actor Alla Pokrovskaya. Their son Mikhail is also an actor.

== In popular culture ==
In the 2013 television series The Thaw, Oleg Yefremov was portrayed by his grandson, Nikita Yefremov.

== Selected filmography ==
- 1955: The First Echelon as Alexey Uzorov
- 1960: Probation as Ulyan Grigorievich Zhur
- 1961: Mission as Shcherbakov
- 1962: My Younger Brother as Viktor Yakovlevich Denisov, scientist, Dima's older brother
- 1964: The Alive and the Dead as Captain Ivanov
- 1965: War and Peace as Dolokhov
- 1965: Someone Is Ringing, Open the Door as Dresvyannikov
- 1966: Beware of the Caras Maxim Podberezovikov
- 1967: Straight Line as Colonel
- 1967: Three Poplars in Plyushcikha as 'Sasha
- 1966: Aybolit-66 as doctor Aybolit
- 1968: Once More About Love as Kartsev
- 1969: King Stag as Durandarte
- 1969: Mama Married as Viktor
- 1970: Shine, Shine, My Star as Fedor, artist
- 1970: The Flight as Colonel
- 1970: The Polynin Case as Polynin
- 1971: All The King's Men as Adam Stanton
- 1972: Hello and Goodbye as Burov
- 1974: Moscow, My Love as Doctor
- 1976: Rudin as Rudin
- 1976: Surgeon Mishkin's Days (TV Mini Series) as Mishkin
- 1977: Open Book as Marlin
- 1978: When I Will Become a Giant as school inspector
- 1979: Poem of Wings as Sergey Rakhmaninov
- 1980: The Imaginary Invalid as Argan
- 1980: Once Upon a Time Twenty Years Later as Painter
- 1984: Another Man's Wife and a Husband under the Bed as Alexander Demyanovich
- 1984: Lets the Charms Last Long as Anton Nikolaevich Skvortsov
- 1985: Battalions Ask for Fire as Colonel Gulyayev
- 1986: The Secret of the Snow Queen as Fairy Tale’s Voice
- 1990: The Hat as Pyotr Nikolaevich Lukin
- 1991: And the wind Returns... as Sergei Yutkevich
- 1995: Shirli-Myrli as Nikolai Grigorievich
- 1998: Composition for Victory Day as Dmitry Kilovatov
- 1998: Chekhov and Co. as father of Savva Zhezlov / landowner Kamyshov

== Honours and awards ==
- USSR State Prize, three times;
  - 1969 — a stage trilogy Decembrists, Narodnaya Volya, Bolsheviks
  - 1974 — for the performance Steelworkers by Gennady Bokarev
  - 1983 — for the play So We Will Win! by Mikhail Shatrov
- Honored Art Worker of the RSFSR (1967)
- People's Artist of the RSFSR (1969)
- People's Artist of the USSR (1976)
- Union TV Festival Jury Prize in Leningrad (Days of the Surgeon Mishkin, 1976)
- Order of the Red Banner of Labour (30 September 1977)
- Order of Lenin (1987)
- Order of Friendship of Peoples (1993)
- Hero of Socialist Labour (1987)
- Order "For Merit to the Fatherland", 3rd class (1997)
- Crystal Turandot Award (1997) c for valiant service to the theatre
- State Prize of the Russian Federation, twice
  - 1997 to maintain and develop the traditions of Russian psychological theatre in the play Three Sisters by Anton Chekhov
  - 2003 (posthumous)
- Luspekayev Prize for Lady Luck at the film festival Kinoshock in Anapa (1997)
- Golden Aries Award (1997) for his contribution to cinema
- Special Jury Prize of the National Theatre Award Golden Mask (1998) for the play Three Sisters by Anton Chekhov
- Moscow Mayor's Award for a unique contribution to culture (1999)
