= Alexander Vampilov =

Soviet playwright (1937–1972)

- Born: 19 August 1937; Cheremkhovo, Irkutsk Oblast, Soviet Union
- Died: 17 August 1972 (aged 34); Lake Baikal
- Writing career
- Literary movement: The Sixtiers

Alexander Valentinovich Vampilov (Russian: Александр Валентинович Вампилов; 19 August 1937 – 17 August 1972) was a Soviet playwright. His play The Elder Son was first performed in 1969, and became a national success two years later. Many of his plays have been filmed or televised in Russia. His four full-length plays were translated into English and Duck Hunting was performed in London and Washington DC (Arena Stage).

== Life ==
Vampilov was the fourth child in the family of schoolteachers. His father, Valentin Nikitich, was of Buryat ancestry, and his mother, Anastasia Prokopievna was Russian, the daughter of a Russian Orthodox Church priest. His father was arrested for alleged nationalist activity.

The young Alexander taught himself guitar and mandolin, and his first comic short stories appeared in magazines in 1958, later collected as A Confluence of Circumstances under the name "A. Sanin". After studying literature and history at the Department of Philology at Irkutsk State University, graduating in 1960, he turned to theatre. He was executive secretary of an Irkutsk newspaper from 1962 to 1964, and later formed an acquaintance with popular dramatist Aleksei Arbuzov.

The first production of Farewell in June in Moscow in 1966 was unsuccessful, but by the early 1970s he was becoming very well known, and his humanity and insight has been compared with that of Chekhov. .

He married in the early 1970s, and drowned in 1972, while fishing on Lake Baikal. Last Summer in Tchulimsk was his final play.

== Youth ==
Aleksandr Valentinovich Vampilov was born in Cheremkhovo in the Irkutsk Oblast of eastern Siberia on 19 August 1937. His father, Valentin Nikitich Vampilov, born in 1898, was a Buryat from the nearby village of Alar. At his father's death, Valentin, who was seventeen, undertook the running of the family's cattle farm. He managed at the same time to graduate from the gymnasium and go on to study in the historical-philological department of Irkutsk State University. Valentin taught Russian language and literature in, and became director of, the high school in Kutulik, the regional center of the Irkutsk oblast, some thirty kilometers south of Alar. In the summer of Vampilov's birth he was transferred to Alar as chief teacher.

The parents of Valentin's wife, Anastasia Prokopevna Kopylova, Prokopi Kopylov and Aleksandra Afrikanovna Medvedeva, were Russian. Kopylov was a priest and teacher of religious law in a women's gymnasium, but after the Revolution he had to sweep streets and chop wood for a living. In 1937 he was arrested on ridiculous but standard charges for the time. Following the arrest, Aleksandra Afrikanovna, settled in Kutulik with her youngest daughter, Anastasia, Aleksandr Vampilov's mother. Aleksandra Afrikanovna lived to ninety two, dying only three years before her famous grandson, whom she had lovingly cared for when he was a child. Born in 1906, Anastasia studied at the gymnasium and then completed a teacher training course.

Aleksandr Vampilov never knew his father, because on 17 January 1938, Valentin was arrested on fabricated charges. He was shot in Irkutsk in March of the same year (and rehabilitated in 1957). Aleksandr was named in honor of Aleksandr Pushkin since the year of his birth was the hundredth anniversary of the poet's death. For his son he bought the new edition of the collected works of Pushkin that was published that year. There is a certain irony in the final choice of first name, in that Vampilov, like his namesake, died prematurely, at almost exactly the same age.

Vampilov was the youngest in the family of three sons and one daughter. He spent his childhood and adolescent years in the town of Kutulik, where the family lived in a room of the teachers' barracks, a log house that in earlier days had been a "forwarding point", the last place that prisoners would spend the night on their way to labor camps.

Vampilov started school in 1944 and was a good student, but not outstanding. He drew well and enjoyed singing. He had a good ear and taught himself to play the guitar and mandolin. He took part both in the school orchestra and, in the university, in an ensemble of folk instruments. Other activities during his school years included fishing, soccer, the school's drama circle, and a passion for writing verses, which he hid from his family and read to friends sworn to secrecy. In 1954 Vampilov graduated from the gymnasium and took the entrance exams for the Department of Historical Philology at the Irkutsk State University. Since he failed the German exam, he had to take the entrance exams again in 1955.

== University and early writing career ==
In 1955 Vampilov moved to Irkutsk and enrolled in the university. In 1958, while still a student, Vampilov published ten stories in several newspapers under the pseudonym Sanin. Only one piece, a dramatic scene entitled “Flowers and Years” (“Цветы и годы”), appeared under his real name. Vampilov was hired by the newspaper Soviet Youth (Советская молодежь) in 1959 and when he graduated from the university a year later, he went to work for the newspaper full-time. Together, work for the newspaper and TOM (Творческое обединение молодых), the Young People's Creative Union, served as a second university for Vampilov, training him to observe life and compelling him to write. TOM included a number of young men not unlike Vampilov—Valentin Rasputin, Vyacheslav Shugaev, Dmitri Sergeev, Yuri Skop—with whom Vampilov became friends.

Vampilov's first collection of stories, A Coincidence (Стечение обстоятельств), appeared in 1961 under the pseudonym A. Sanin. He wrote most of these stories while still at the university. In the following years he participated in a number of seminars for young playwrights. In 1964 he left Soviet Youth, contributed to two collections of stories and sketches by Irkutsk authors, and made his debut as a playwright with the publication of The House with a View of the Field (Дом окнами в поле) in the November issue of Theatre (Театр). With that success under his belt, Vampilov set out with Vyacheslav Shugaev in 1965 to conquer Moscow. He attended advanced courses at the Gorky Literary Institute from 1965 to 1967 and made the rounds of all the theaters of Moscow with a copy of the first version of Farewell in June (Прощание в июне) that initially bore the title The Fair (Ярмарка). But he had no success in getting it adopted anywhere. Nevertheless, he made the acquaintance of Aleksandr Tvardovsky and was recommended for membership in the Union of Writers. He was accepted into the Union in February 1966, the year he completed The Elder Son (Старший сын), first titled The Suburb (Предместье) and published Farewell in June. The latter had its premier in ten theaters of the Soviet Union in the autumn. The following spring, Vampilov completed his literary courses and returned to Irkutsk.

== Theatrical career ==
Eventually Vampilov emerged as one of the principal figures in the generation of dramatists who came to prominence following the death of Stalin. He reached the height of his popularity in the seventies and the first half of the eighties, but the process had begun already in his own lifetime. In 1967, the year he returned to Irkutsk from Moscow, Farewell in June had over 700 performances in fourteen theaters, and it continued to receive widespread production in the following years. The Elder Son, published in 1968 under the title The Suburb in the journal Angara (Ангара), enjoyed even greater success. It came out in a separate edition in 1970, and by 1971 was one of the leaders of the season playing in twenty-eight different theaters with more than a thousand performances that year.

The fate of the one-acts, Twenty Minutes with an Angel (Двадцать минут с ангелом) and Incident with a Typesetter (История с метранпажем), was somewhat different, and both Duck Hunting (Утиная охота) and Last Summer in Chulimsk (Прошлым летом в Чулимске) gained recognition only belatedly, after Vampilov's death. Twenty Minutes with an Angel, written in 1962, was published in Angara in 1970. Incident with a Typesetter, finished in 1968, was published in a separate edition in 1971. Vampilov combined the two into Provincial Anecdotes(Провинциальные анекдоты), and they were first produced by the BDT, Big Dramatic Theater (Большой Драматический Театр), in Leningrad in March 1972, under the direction of A.G. Tovstonogov. During the winter of 1971, Vampilov took part in the rehearsals at the BDT. Although Vampilov's first plays were widely produced around the country, he always experienced difficulty getting his works produced, especially in Moscow and Leningrad. His correspondence with Elena Yakushkina (who worked in the literary department of the Ermolov Theater) reflects the problems he encountered. Likewise, although his works became very popular, few directors staged them adequately. Reviews of productions repeatedly note that directors do not quite know how to handle Vampilov's plays, for they misunderstand the style and content of the works. Even fifteen years after Vampilov's death, following the accession to leadership of Mikhail Gorbachev and the introduction of his policy of glasnost’ that had a liberating effect on the arts, and in spite of many productions, both successful and unsuccessful, the treatment of Vampilov's plays had not gone beyond conventional staging nor were they presented with full understanding.

== Final years and death ==
In 1970 Vampilov participated in a seminar for young playwrights in Dubulti and a seminar for young writers in Yalta. His play, Duck Hunting, was published this year (in Angara), but was not staged until 1976, in Riga. Reviews of his other plays, however, appeared in 1970 in leading journals: Theatre (Театр), Komsomol Truth (Комсомольская правда), and Soviet Culture (Советская культура). The following year Vampilov worked on Valentina (Валентина), the first version of Last Summer in Chulimsk. He finished the play that same year but never saw it in print, because it was withdrawn from the literary almanac, Siberia (Сибирь) in the spring of 1972. It was not performed until 1973. Vampilov was in Moscow from January until May 1972, working with Tovstonogov on the staging of Farewell in June at the Stanislavsky Theater, and taking part in rehearsals of The Elder Son at the Ermolov Theater. In March he was in Leningrad for the premiere of Two Anecdotes (Provincial Anecdotes) but then returned to Moscow, where his wife, Olga, joined him. Vampilov busied himself with a multitude of petty tasks that he had long postponed, but most importantly, he made arrangements for the first collection of his plays to be published. Although he persistently spoke of his wish to return to prose, to write a novel, to start afresh, in the summer Vampilov began composing another dramatic piece, a "vaudeville", The Incomparable Nakonechnikov (Несравненный Наконечников). In May he had gone to Irkutsk, with plans to return to Moscow in September. But in August he drowned.

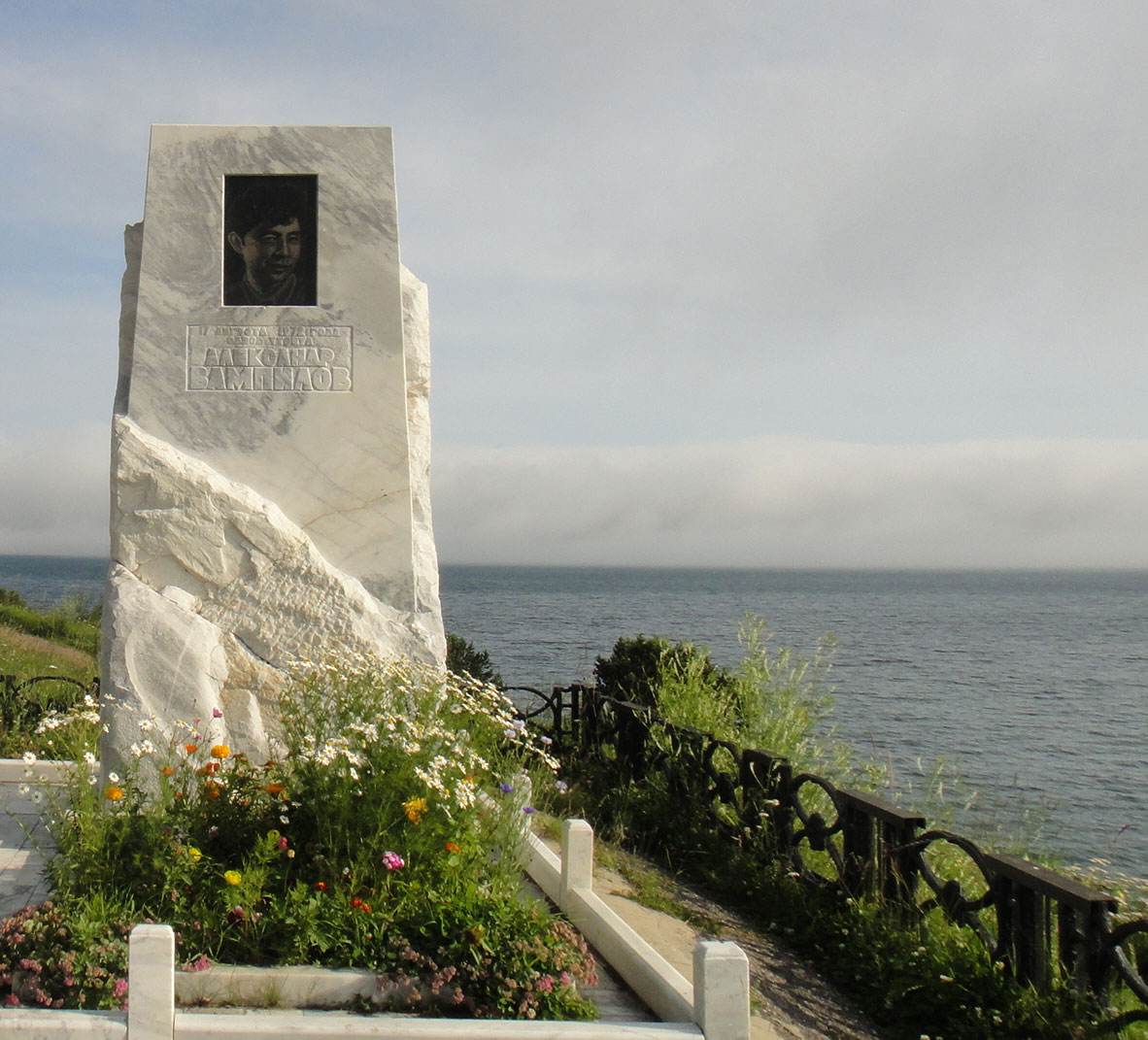
Memorial at the site of Vampilov's death

19 August 1972 would have been Aleksandr Vampilov's 35th birthday. He decided to treat his invited guests invited to ukha, a soup made with fresh fish. In preparation, he went fishing with a friend on Lake Baikal on August 17. On the way back, the two were caught in a storm that was brewing, the boat struck an underwater log, and capsized. Vampilov's companion, the Irkutsk writer, Gleb Pakulov, described later how he seized hold of the overturned boat, but Vampilov, an excellent swimmer, swam towards the shore. From the vantage point of the lake, it appeared to Pakulov that Vampilov had nearly reached the shore, but his dead body was later found in quite deep water, which indicates that he had not made it to safety. Rather, his heart gave out and he drowned.

At the time of his death, Vampilov was married to his second wife, Olga Mikhailovna Vampilova, with whom he had a daughter, Elena, in 1966. In 1999 his widow published a new collection, nearly 800 pages long, of his works, notebooks, and letters.

== Personality ==
There are many memoirs about Vampilov by his friends and colleagues, and several by relatives and teachers. The picture they paint of Vampilov is one of a shy, taciturn and thoughtful individual, yet with a sense of irony as well as of fun. The memoirs comment repeatedly on Vampilov's modesty, while at the same time remarking over and over again that he was very sociable and was always surrounded by many friends. The explanation for Vampilov's attractiveness may lie in his sympathy for and sensitivity to people, in his artlessness and naturalness, and in the fact that he was rarely sullen or depressed among friends, but rather usually smiling. In addition to noting Vampilov's huge charm, friends frequently remark on the absence of falsity in his behavior. They also write about his mischievous and sarcastic side, his readiness to crack jokes, and his spontaneity. While the memoirs reveal the lighter aspects of Vampilov's personality, they also present him as a serious, sincere and ardent person, fearless in life and in his work. Several characterize him as perceptive, wise, far-sighted and all-understanding. The author and fellow Siberian Dmitri Sergeev states that Vampilov had the wisdom of a mature person, yet the ingenuousness and inquisitiveness of a child. A trait of Vampilov's that impressed many was his faculty for succinct statement. One of Vampilov's oldest and closest friends was the writer Valentin Rasputin. They met in their first years at the university, worked together on the newspaper Soviet Youth, began to write stories at almost the same time, took part in discussions at the seminar for young writers in Chita in 1965, were accepted into the Union of Writers around the same time, and fairly often ended up on trips together. Rasputin comments on Vampilov's expressing himself in a way that compelled others to listen to him and on his enriching conversations by taking a non-standard approach to the subject at hand.

He was a cultured person in the best, most respected sense of this word. He was able to listen and he was able to speak precisely, interestingly and dependent on no one, which compelled everyone to listen to him. [...] In Sasha that which they call inner tact was wonderfully developed and organized, and this concept includes taste, measure, harmony, the balance, gentleness, boldness and musicality of the human soul. [...] It would be a pity if someone [...] got the idea that we now want to make an angel of Sasha. No, he, fortunately, is not qualified to be an angel. But as a man, living among us and being our friend, he was a rare person, the best among us. [...] Sasha could do nothing casually—neither work, nor being a friend, nor love, nor converse, nor live—he behaved towards everything sincerely, with his whole heart.

Several times the adjectives "boyish" and "childlike" appear in the memoirs to describe Vampilov's behavior or his smile. His appearance too was youthful. Dmitri Sergeev states that Vampilov looked younger than his years and stood out in any gathering. Similarly, the playwright Aleksei Simukov admits that he was always struck by Vampilov's glance, which seemed to go right through people, accompanied always by the same slightly mocking, slightly embarrassed half-smile.

A repeated refrain in the memoirs and biographical sketches concerns his ability to play the guitar. His mother writes that he was carried away by music, sports, and the drama circle in school and that he played the guitar and sang. Biographers note that Vampilov never parted from his guitar, and Simukov says that Vampilov played the guitar "strikingly"; others state that he sang excellently. Vampilov's taste in music was not confined, however, to popular songs. He loved classical music, especially Mozart, but also Beethoven and Glinka.

Vampilov leaned towards the classics as well in his literary tastes. His mother writes that he read a lot, and she lists Pushkin, Lermontov, Chekhov, Esenin, and Tolstoy among his reading matter. Dmitri Sergeev tells us that Vampilov was familiar with a wide range of drama, both Russian and international, and contemporary and historical; and likewise had a broad knowledge of poetry, with a particular fondness for the verses of Tyutchev. Sergeev refers to Vampilov's attraction to Gogol and tells of an instance when Vampilov read Dostoevsky's Notes From the Underground and upon finishing the work immediately re-read it. Vladimir Zhemchuzhnikov claims that Vampilov's favorite authors were Gogol, Chekhov, Sukhovo-Kobylin, Naidenov and Bulgakov. Other writers, among many, whom Vampilov read are Proust and Hemingway and evidently he loved Anouilh. From these accounts it is clear that Vampilov had numerous and varied sources to draw on for inspiration. His eclectic style testifies to his having made effective use of what he read. He took elements from many sources and combined them with his own, original features to create a memorable body of plays and stories.

== See also ==
- The Elder Son (1976 film): Soviet two-part television adaptation of Vampilov's play
- The Elder Son (2006 film): American film loosely based on Vampilov's play

== Works ==
- Farewell in June (Прощание в июне) (1966, rewritten 1970)
- The Elder Son (Старший сын) (1967)
- House, Overlooking the Field (Дом окнами в поле)
- Provincial Anecdotes (Провинциальные анекдоты) (1968, comprising the one-act plays An Incident with a Paginator (Случай с метранпажем) and Twenty Minutes with an Angel (Двадцать минут с ангелом))
- Duck Hunting (Утиная охота) (1970)
- Last Summer in Chulimsk (Прошлым летом в Чулимске) (1972)
- "Прогулки по Кутулику". Советская молодежь 15, 17 August 1968: n.pag.
- Прощание в июне. Пьесы. Москва: Советский писатель, 1977
- Белые города. Москва: Современник, 1979
- Дом окнами в поле. Иркутск: Восточно-Сибирское книжное издательство, 1982
- Избранное. 2nd ed. Москва: Искусство, 1984
- Я с вами люди. Москва: Советская Россия, 1988
- Избранное. Москва: Согласие, 1999
- Last Summer in Chulimsk. Trans. Margaret Wettlin. In Nine Modern Soviet Plays. Ed. Victor Komissarzhevsky. Moscow: Progress, 1977. 467–542
- The House With a View in the Field. Trans. A. Fyodorov. Soviet Literature 3 (1980), 140–48
- The Elder Son. Trans. Maya Gordeyeva and Mike Davidow. In Five of the Best Soviet Plays of the 1970s. Moscow: Raduga, n.d., 282–323
- Farewell in June: Four Russian Plays. Trans. Kevin Windle and Amanda Metcalf. St. Lucia: University of Queensland Press, 1983
- Duck Hunting, Last Summer in Chulimsk. Trans. Patrick Miles. Nottingham: Bramcote Press, 1994
- The Major Plays. Trans. Alma Law. Newark, NJ: Harwood Academic Publishers, 1996

== Bibliography ==
- Farber, Vreneli, Aleksandr Vampilov: An Ironic Observer (New York: Peter Lang, 2001) ISBN 0-8204-5171-1
- Farber, Vreneli, The Prose of Aleksandr Vampilov (New York: Peter Lang, 2003) ISBN 0-8204-6813-4
- Streltsova, Elena, Плен утиной охоты (Иркутск: Издание ГП "Иркутская областная типография No. 1", 1998) [Biography and analysis of Vampilov's works]
- Elizarova, E. D., comp. Александр Валентинович Вампилов: Библиографический Указатель, ed. L. A. Kazantseva and M.D. Sergeev (Иркутск:Редакционно-издательский отдел упрполиграфиздата, 1989) [Bibliographical index covering 1958–1986.]
- Zhikhareva, T. D., comp. Александр Валентинович Вампилов: Библиографический Указатель, ed. L. A. Kazantseva (Иркутск: Изд-во Иркутской областной публичной библиотеки имени И.И. Молчанова-Сибирского, 2000) [Bibliographical index covering 1987–1997.]
- Miles, Patrick. "Duck Hunting by Alexander Vampilov". International Dictionary of Theatre: Plays. Ed. Mark Hawkins-Dady. London: St James Press, 1992. 205–206.
- Miles, Patrick. "Aleksandr Vampilov: A Playwright Whose Time Is Now". British East-West Journal 99 (December 1994): 7–8.
- Miles, Patrick.Introduction. Duck Hunting, Last Summer in Chulimsk. By Aleksandr Vampilov. Trans. Patrick Miles. Nottingham: Bramcote Press, 1994. 7–9.
- Miles, Patrick. "Vampilov". International Dictionary of Theatre: Playwrights. London: St James Press, 1994. 992–994.
