= Ksenia, Fedor's Beloved Wife =

- Russian: Ксения, любимая жена Фёдора
- Directed by: Vitaliy Melnikov
- Written by: Aleksandr Gelman; Tatyana Kaletskaya
- Starring: Alla Meshcheryakova; Stanislav Lyubshin; Lev Durov; Lyudmila Zaytseva; Vasiliy Merkurev
- Cinematography: Yuri Veksler
- Music by: Oleg Karavaychuk
- Release date: 1974
- Running time: 82 minute
- Country: Soviet Union
- Language: Russian

Ksenia, Fedor's Beloved Wife (Russian: Ксения, любимая жена Фёдора) is a 1974 Soviet drama film directed by Vitaliy Melnikov.

== Plot ==
The film tells about the love, complex relationships and human generosity that everyone needs.

== Cast ==
- Alla Meshcheryakova as Kseniya Ivanova
- Stanislav Lyubshin as Fyodor Petrov
- Lev Durov as Sidorov
- Lyudmila Zaytseva as Valentina
- Vasiliy Merkurev as Personnel Director
- Azat Sherents
- Vladimir Tatosov as Kondratyev
- Lorents Arushanyan as Reporter
- Armen Khostikyan
- Oleg Belov as Worker in a Canteen
