= The Shot (Pushkin) =

1831 short story by Alexander Pushkin

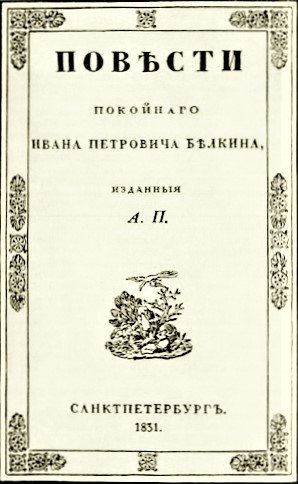
The Belkin Tales cover

"The Shot" (Выстрел) is a short story by Aleksandr Pushkin published in 1831. It is the first story in Pushkin's The Tales of the Late Ivan Petrovich Belkin, a cycle of five short stories. "The Shot" details events at a military outpost in a Russian province, and then several years later, on a country estate. Pushkin discusses themes of honor, revenge and death, and places them within the broader context of Russian society. "The Shot" tells the story of a retired soldier named Silvio, who harbors a grudge for many years following an argument in which he was disrespected in front of his peers. Told from the perspective of an unnamed narrator, the story concludes with Silvio returning to seek his revenge against the man who wronged him, the Count.

Pushkin's inspiration for "The Shot" was a combination of his own personal experience, as well as the works of his peers. Pushkin himself noted that Silvio's character was influenced by the writing of a fellow Russian, Alexander Bestuzhev. Although a shorter work, "The Shot" influenced later Russian literature, including Fyodor Dostoyevsky’s Notes from Underground. This story remains popular and relevant for modern readers. It gives readers insight into 19th century Russian society, and the air of mystery surrounding Silvio serves to attract and retain readers.

== Setting ==
By placing the setting in the provincial region of Russia, Pushkin creates a setting that is relatively dull to the reader. He instead uses the plot and character development to fill the void. The village is home to a military outpost, which sets the scene for "The Shot". The setting allows the reader to focus on the conflict between the characters rather than the significance of its placement in Russia and how that may affect the symbolism behind its location. The second part of "The Shot" takes place at the Count's estate. The estate is large and luxurious, and a stark contrast from Silvio's humble home. Pushkin uses the juxtaposition between the Count's and Silvio's living situations as a way to accentuate the differences in the two characters.

== Autobiographical elements ==
Many elements in "The Shot" can be connected to Pushkin's experiences as a young adult. In 1817, during his last year of school, he befriended Russian soldiers stationed near his school in St. Petersburg and frequently socialized with them – often drinking and playing card games. His experiences drinking and gambling with idle Russian soldiers gave Pushkin a first-hand account of the behavior of 19th-century Russian soldiers, which is reflected in "The Shot". Furthermore, having lived in provincial Russia, Pushkin was familiar with the setting. From 1824 to 1826 Pushkin lived on his family's Mikhailovskoye Estate in western Russia, about 300 km southwest of St. Petersburg. He spent much of his time there in solitude; however, he did befriend a family nurse on the estate. The nurse often told Pushkin folk tales that inspired many of his later works. Lastly, the dueling elements in "The Shot" are drawn heavily from Pushkin's own dealings with dueling. Pushkin died in 1837 in a duel with Georges D’Anthes; however, it was not Pushkin's first duel. He took part in numerous duels during his early adulthood, and was very lucky to escape from them unscathed. The first duel between Silvio and The Count was directly based on one of Pushkin's earlier duels. Robert Chandler writes that, “As for dueling, Pushkin seems to have shown more bravado than ever; on one occasion he arrived with a hatful of cherries, eating them while his opponent took the first shot.” After his opponent Zubov missed, Pushkin walked off without taking his shot. In "The Shot", the Count begins to eat a hatful of cherries in the middle of the duel, angering Silvio.

== Plot summary ==
"The Shot" was told to Belkin by Colonel I.L.P., who was stationed at a Russian military outpost as an infantry officer. The officers always visit a mysterious man named Silvio to play cards. Silvio is a well-known marksman, and constantly practices shooting. The walls of his house are riddled with bullet holes. On one occasion Silvio is insulted by an officer who is new to the regiment, but he does not challenge his guest to a duel, as custom dictates. He is then considered to be a coward by most of the officers. This particularly confuses the narrator, who cannot fathom why Silvio does not duel the officer, due to his skill with a pistol. Silvio eventually explains his situation privately to the narrator: years ago he was an extremely popular soldier, but was overcome with jealousy after the arrival of a new officer. The new officer was extremely handsome, a skilled marksman, from a wealthy family, and was very successful with women. Silvio sought him out at a ball and whispered an insult in his ear. The officer, later known as the Count, then slapped him in the face as a response, and as a result, a duel was arranged for the following dawn. The Count drew the lot to shoot first, and put his shot through Silvio's hat. As Silvio prepared to shoot, he was extremely unnerved by the manner in which his opponent was casually eating cherries while waiting for him to shoot. He decided that life apparently was meaningless to the carefree and confident young man. As a result, Silvio did not shoot back, choosing not a kill a man that did not value his own life. Silvio explains to the Narrator that since that day he has been completely captivated by exacting revenge on the Count. If he had now engaged the officer in a duel over the card game, he would almost certainly have killed him, but also taken the risk of dying before being able to exact revenge on the Count. After that day, Silvio soon learns that the Count is engaged to be married, and so may now no longer be indifferent towards life. This is the moment Silvio has been tirelessly waiting for, and he departs from the village to get his revenge.

After several years, the narrator leaves active duty and leaves for his country estate, in the town of P. He finds life very dull and often yearns for his past life in the military outpost. After a while, his neighbors arrive, in particular a beautiful young countess, and the narrator visits them soon after. On the wall he notices a painting of a Swiss landscape with two bullet holes on top of each other. The narrator, seeing this, tells his neighbor about a man he knew in the army who was an extraordinary shot, and tells the Count of Silvio. The Count is overcome with fear, and begins to tell the narrator that he was Silvio's opponent, and shortly after his wedding Silvio claimed his right to fire his response shot. The Count describes that Silvio chooses not to shoot the unarmed Count, rather he wants to draw lots for a new duel. The Count again draws the right to shoot first, but is nervous and misses, and the bullet ends up in the painting of a Swiss landscape. As Silvio aims to shoot, the Countess enters the room. Silvio takes pity on her and instead of firing upon the Count, shoots the painting in almost exactly the same spot as the Count. Silvio again spares the Count's life, yet he demonstrates how easily he could have killed the Count. Knowing he could have killed the Count, Silvio satisfies his conscience, and proceeds to leave the house, never to be seen again. We learn later that Silvio was killed leading a regiment in battle in the Greek Revolution, in combat against Ottoman forces.

== Genre ==
Though it may not appear to be the most obvious genre, Pushkin in fact is writing mostly satirically through his construction of "The Shot". The first and most obvious genre that influences Pushkin's writing style is his “Romantic” one, which is apparent in the characters and their sense of tradition. However, this doesn’t make up the bulk of his story, as he takes a traditional character like Silvio and pits him against the rest of society with his lack of honor that is displayed in the first duel he has. In the sense of parody, Pushkin focuses on the nature of characters to focus on tradition and honor, and how they fall apart over the course of the tale. The narrative behind Silvio shows that he was once an honorable man who later fell to his own selfishness, brushing aside the history of his ancestors and therefore transcending the Romantic nature of Pushkin's writing. This is observable at the end as well, when the Count turns to the man that Silvio once was, one who would not die with honor, therefore switching their places in an honorable society while marking both of the changes they undergo.

== Characters ==
=== Narrator (Colonel I.L.P.) ===
The narrator of "The Shot" relates the events that take place in this story from a first person perspective. There is not much information revealed about the narrator, as the focus of the story is on Silvio. He lives in a military outpost in the rural village of N. He is an infantry officer, and often spent time with Silvio, either having dinner or gambling. After Silvio does not challenge the officer who offended him to a duel, the narrator cannot forget this episode, and is unable to stop considering why Silvio did not duel him. After Silvio announces his departure, the narrator stays after dinner to hear his explanation for not dueling the other officer. He learns that when Silvio served in the X. Hussar Regiment, he dueled another man, but did not take his shot, because he could tell that the other man did not care.

Several years later, the narrator lived in a poor village in P. District. He managed his estate, and yearned for his old, simpler existence. During his second year at the estate, a wealthy couple who lived nearby were coming to visit their estate. This was an exciting prospect, and he planned on going to pay his respects. When they arrive, the narrator goes to meet them, and was very impressed by the Count and Countess and their estate. He notices two bullet holes in the painting of a Swiss landscape, and remarks that whoever made them must be very talented. The Count then tells him the story of those bullet holes, and the narrator learns that this was the Count who twice engaged in a duel with Silvio.

=== Silvio ===
Silvio is a retired military officer living in the Russian provinces. "The Shot" is centered around Silvio and his obsessive desire for revenge on The Count. The narrator befriends him, and Silvio explains to him the history between himself and The Count. Silvio is pensive and careful throughout the story, undisturbed by anything that does not involve the Count. We learn at the end of the story that after the final shot, Silvio returned to the military and was killed in battle.

=== The Count ===
As the antagonist to Silvio, the Count emerges as the person who sent Silvio's life into a spiral with his involvement in the same military regiment as Silvio. By causing Silvio's jealousy, he also reveals the weakness behind Silvio's character and how weak the perceived sense of honor could be in military Russia. The Count is the tool that Pushkin uses to show how weak people in society are and how easy to change they can be. The Count forces Silvio to learn more about himself and how he perceives himself, but is also strong enough to force him into madness. He later in the story is put in the same position as Silvio once was but ends up being allowed to live because his wife, the Countess, begs for him.

=== The Countess ===
The Countess is the wife of the Count. She is a minor character in the story. She arrives in the middle of the second duel with The Count. Her arrival is the reason that Silvio takes pity on the Count and spares his life.

=== Lieutenant R. ===
One night, after eating dinner with a group of other officers at Silvio's house, the group decided to play cards. He absentmindedly bent the corner of a card, and when Silvio (correctly) changed the score, he began to argue with Silvio. He grew extremely angry at this, and due to his alcohol consumption and embarrassment at his colleagues’ laughter, he threw a brass candleholder at Silvio. The object barely missed Silvio, who stood up and threw the officer out of his house. The officer states that he is ready to answer for the offense, and expects to duel Silvio. The next day he had heard nothing from Silvio, which shocked many of the other officers. The officer is not approached by Silvio, which confuses the rest of the regiment, especially the narrator.

== Themes ==
=== Courage and compassion ===
The theme of courage is an important one throughout the story. When Silvio does not challenge the offending officer to a duel, many soldiers assume that he is lacking courage, and regard him negatively for this. The narrator states that “a lack of courage is something the young can least forgive; they consider valor the height of human virtue and an excuse for all possible vices.” The idea of courage was extremely important to young men in Russian society at this time, and so to refuse to duel someone was strongly looked down upon. Though the majority of soldiers soon forget about this episode, the narrator cannot, because he is perplexed by Silvio's actions. He does not believe him to be a coward, and soon learns the real reason Silvio declined to challenge the officer. Related to this is the theme of honor, which is explored in this story by Pushkin.

=== Honor ===
Honor is a persistent theme that motivates many of the characters in the story. In 1722, Peter the Great introduced the Table of Ranks into Russian society, cementing a strict societal hierarchy that lasted for over 150 years. Silvio is initially introduced gambling with the narrator's military regiment. A soldier insults Silvio and accuses him of cheating. This would traditionally result in a duel, yet Silvio refuses to challenge him. Many of the people in the regiment view this as “dishonorable”. We later learn that, despite Silvio's apparent lack of honor, all of his life has been based on regaining his honor which he had lost long ago to the Count. This contrast between the Count and Silvio creates the greatest conflict of honor perceived in this story. The Count is victorious in a duel because of his lack of care for life over honor, but Silvio is changed so much by this experience that he must continue to fight his way back for it. Honor is balanced throughout this tale in various different forms and is weighed constantly against the value of life which ends up being the greatest contrast of all. This is why Pushkin's story is indeed a parody, because despite each character being primarily motivated by personal interest and honor, their desire for life supersedes all in the end.

=== Dueling ===
Russia experienced the most dueling in its history during the beginning of the 19th century, which is when "The Shot" takes place. Dueling became a preferred method by Russians to settle all types of conflicts. Anything from disagreements in business, settling disputes over women, trivial insults, or broader social class conflicts were the source of many duels. Any action that questioned one's honor was subject to a duel, and dueling itself was a part of a gentleman's “honor code”. Dueling was a highly ritualized event, and despite many attempts from the state to outlaw the practice, it persisted for centuries. It was seen as the primary way for a gentleman to restore his honor during that time period. 19th century Russian literature often centered around dueling, and works such as "The Shot" helped propel its status as a cultural norm in Russian society.

== Adaptations ==
- A Pistol Shot (1942 film) is a 1942 Italian adaptation of "The Shot". It was directed by Renato Castellani.
- Wystrzał, 1965 Polish film; dubbed into Russian under the title Несостоявшаяся дуэль ("A Duel that Did Not Happen") premiered in 1967
- A Pistol Shot (1966 film) is a 1966 Soviet adaptation of "The Shot". It was produced in the Soviet Union and portrayed in Russian. It was directed by Naum Trakhtenberg and starred Mikhail Kozakov as Silvio.
- The Pistol Shot is a 1968 British television adaptation of "The Shot". It was broadcast by the BBC on 20 May 1968, as part of the BBC’s Theatre 625 programme. A young, and relatively unknown, David Bowie was part of the dance troupe that performed a minuet for the programme, where he met fellow dancer and his first love Hermione Farthingale.
- The Shot is a 1982 U.S.A. adaptation of "The Shot", adapted for the CBS Radio Mystery Theater titled The Last Duel, which first aired on April 30, 1982

== English translations ==
- The Shot, translated by T. Keane (1894)
- "The Shot", translated by Paul Debrececzeny (1983)
- "The Shot", translated by Peter Campbell (2014)
