= Vladimir Valutsky =

Russian screenwriter (1936–2015)

- Born: Vladimir Ivanovich Valutsky; 25 September 1936; Moscow, Soviet Union
- Died: 14 April 2015 (aged 78); Moscow, Russia
- Occupations: Screenwriter, writer
- Years active: 1961–2012
- Spouse: Alla Demidova

Vladimir Ivanovich Valutsky (Russian: Влади́мир Ива́нович Валу́цкий; 25 September 1936 — 14 April 2015) was a Soviet and Russian screenwriter. Between 1964 and 2013 he wrote and co-wrote 60 screenplays. He was awarded the Honoured Worker of the Arts Industry of the RSFSR in 1987.

== Early years ==
Vladimir was born in Moscow, Russian SFSR into a mixed Russian-Polish family. His father Ivan Ivanovich (Yanovich) Valutsky moved from Poland to Moscow at the beginning of the World War I along with his own mother Maria Ivanovna Valutskaya and his brother Stefan. He studied engineering and built aerodromes during the Great Patriotic War, then worked in Gosplan and various ministries. Vladimir's mother Galina Vasilyevna Valutskaya (née Kolcheva) was a housewife. Her parents — Vasily Alekseyevich Kolchev and Iulitta Ivanovna Rakhmanova, both from working-class families — arrived to Moscow from the Ryazan Governorate and the Tula Governorate respectively.

Valutsky started practicing screenwriting during his school days as he and his friends were watching many trophy films captured during the war. In 1956 he entered VGIK to study screenwriting under Valentin Turkin. During the studies he met Alla Demidova, also a student at the Boris Shchukin Theatre Institute, and married her in 1961. Same year he and several other students were expelled from the institute following a grand scandal: it was revealed they had written a parody on a revolutionary drama play that featured Vladimir Lenin. Vladimir later managed to enroll back to VGIK and eventually finished it in 1964 (Yevgeny Gabrilovich's course).

== Career ==
In-between he co-wrote a play Fallen and Alive for the newly-found Taganka Theatre where his wife served as a leading actress, although his novel was banned from the play by censorship. After graduating he got acquainted with Vitaly Melnikov, also a young director who was searching for a screenwriter for his feature comedy debut. The Head of Chukotka was produced in 1966 and released to a mild success (15.7 million viewers), yet it gave a great push to the career of the popular comedy actor Mikhail Kononov. It also started a long-lasting collaboration between Valutsky and Melnikov. In four years they made another comedy film — Seven Brides of Yefreytor Zbruev that turned into one of the box office leaders of 1971 (11th place with 31.2 million viewers). They produced the total of four movies between 1966 and 1987.

Valutsky also regularly worked with Igor Maslennikov. Between 1969 and 2009 they made seven movies together, including the second entry in the popular Soviet TV series The Adventures of Sherlock Holmes and Dr. Watson and Winter Cherry, a popular drama of the late 1980s (4th place with 32.1 million viewers) that won several awards at the 1986 All-Union Film Festival and was continued in two sequels. In March 2016 Maslennikov revealed his plans to produce the fourth part based on his own screenplay.

Valutsky was among those few Soviet screenwriters who successfully continued their career after the dissolution of the Soviet Union. His most famous work of this time period was a biographical war drama Admiral (2008) about the fate of Alexander Kolchak. With a $38 135 878 gross it is among the highest-grossing films of the post-Soviet Russia. A longer version of the movie was made into a 10-part TV mini-series and showed by the Channel One Russia in 2009. Valutskiy also wrote a screenplay for another biographical mini-series Yesenin (2005) about one of the greatest Russian poets of the 20th century Sergei Yesenin. It was based on the book by the Russian actor Vitali Bezrukov; his son Sergey Bezrukov played the main part.

Valutsky himself played small parts in two movies: Concerto for Two Violins (1975) and Charlotte's Necklace (1984). Between 1990 and 1995 Valutsky also taught screenwriting courses at VGIK. During his late years he wrote a children's book Romuald the Tasmanian about the adventures of an Australian wombat. Despite living together for 54 years, he and his wife Alla Demidova left no children.

Vladimir Valutsky died on April 14, 2015, after a long illness. He was buried at the Troyekurovskoye Cemetery.

== Selected filmography ==
Year	Title	Original title	
Year	Title	Original title	Notes
1964	Fitil No.27	Фитиль	Permanently Registered novel
1966	The Head of Chukotka	Начальник чукотки	
1970	Seven Brides of Gefreiter Zbruev	Семь невест ефрейтора Збруева	
1972	Commander of the Lucky 'Pike'	Командир счастливой «Щуки»	
1975	Concerto for Two Violins	Концерт для двух скрипок	also actor (Grisha)
1978	Inquest of Pilot Pirx	Дознание пилота Пиркса	Soviet-Polish co-production
1978	Yaroslavna, Queen of France	Ярославна, королева Франции	
1980	The Adventures of Sherlock Holmes and Dr. Watson	Приключения Шерлока Холмса и доктора Ватсона	TV mini-series
1981	Dog in Boots	Пёс в сапогах	animation
1983	Mary Poppins, Goodbye	Мэри Поппинс, до свидания	
1984	Another Man's Wife and a Husband Under the Bed	Чужая жена и муж под кроватью	
1984	Charlotte's Necklace	Колье Шарлотты	actor only (Paczynski the collector)
1985	Winter Cherry	Зимняя вишня	
1987	First Meeting, Last Meeting	Первая встреча, последняя встреча	
1987	Curse of Snakes Valley	Заклятие долины змей	Soviet-Polish co-production
1990	Winter Cherry 2	Зимняя вишня 2	
1995	Winter Cherry 3	Зимняя вишня 3	
2003	Bless the Woman	Благословите женщину	
2005	Yesenin	Есенин	TV mini-series
2008	Admiral	Адмиралъ	
2012	God Loves Caviar	O Theos agapaei to haviari	Greek-Russian co-production
2012	Spy	Шпион	
