= Svetlana Kryuchkova (actress) =

Soviet and Russian actress

- Светлана Крючкова
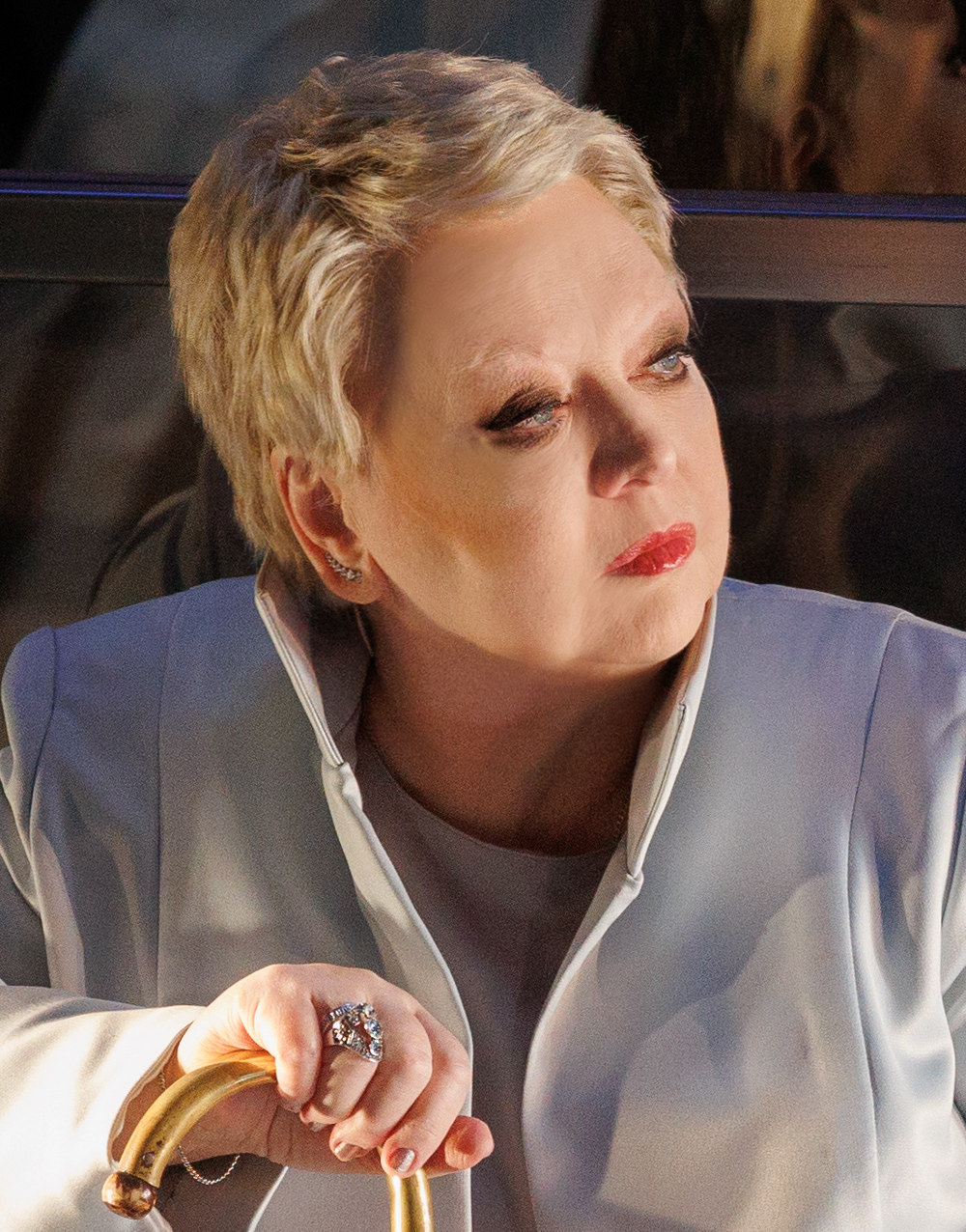
- Kryuchkova in 2022
- Born: Svetlana Nikolaevna Kryuchkova; 22 June 1950 (age 75); Kishinev, Moldavian SSR, Soviet Union
- Occupation: Actress
- Years active: 1971–now

Svetlana Nikolaevna Kryuchkova (Russian: Светлана Никoлаeвна Кpючкoва; born 22 June 1950) is a Soviet and Russian actress.

Kryuchkova was born in Kishinev, Moldavian SSR (now Chişinău, Moldova). From 1975 to 1989, she was married to Yuri Veksler. She married Aleksandr Molodtsov in 1990. She has one child from each marriage.

== Selected filmography ==
=== Film ===
Year	Title	Role	Notes
1975	It Can't Be! (Не может быть!)	Zinaida (it Zinulya), Nicholas's wife	
1976	The Elder Son (Старший сын)	Sarafanov's neighbor Natalia Makarska	
1979	Nameless Star (Безымянная звезда)	Mademoiselle Kuku	
1981	The Hound of the Baskervilles (Собака Баскервилей)	Mrs. Barrymore	
1981	Family Relations (Родня)	Nina	
1983	If to Believe Lopotukhin... (Если верить Лопотухину...)	Alla Konstantinovna	
1984	Scarecrow (Чучело)	Aunt Klava	
1987	Courier (Курьер)	Zinaida Pavlovna	
1988	Bright Personality (Светлая личность)	Segidilia Karpovna	
1994	The Flood (Наводнение)	Pelagiya	
1994	Burnt by the Sun (Утомлённые солнцем)	Mokhova	
2000	Old Hags (Старые клячи)	Masha	
2005	Brezhnev (Брежнев)	Viktoria Brezhneva	
2009	Bury Me Behind the Baseboard (Похороните меня за плинтусом)	Grandma	
2025	Two People in One Life and a Dog (Двое в одной жизни, не считая собаки)	Lyudmila Pavlovna	

=== TV ===
Year	Title	Role	Notes
1972	Big School-Break (Большая перемена)	Nelly	
2007	Liquidation (Ликвидация)	Aunt Pesya	
2013	Sherlock Holmes (Шерлок Холмс)	Queen Victoria	

== Awards and nominations ==
- Honored Artist of the RSFSR (1983)
- People's Artist of the RSFSR (1991)
- Golden Eagle Award for Best Actress in Pokhoronite menya za plintusom — nominated (2010)
- Winner of two Nika Awards (1990, 2010)
- Stanislavsky Award (2020)
