= A Pistol Shot (1966 film) =

1966 film

- Russian: Выстрел
- Directed by: Naum Trakhtenberg
- Written by: Alexander Pushkin; Nikolai Kovarsky
- Starring: Mikhail Kozakov; Yury Yakovlev; Ariadna Shengelaia; Oleg Tabakov as Belkin; Valeri Babyatinsky; Vladlen Davydov
- Cinematography: Semyon Sheynin
- Edited by: L. Strazheva
- Music by: Karen Khachaturyan
- Production company: Mosfilm
- Release date: 1966
- Running time: 77 minutes
- Country: Soviet Union
- Language: Russian

A Pistol Shot (Russian: Выстрел) is a 1966 Soviet drama film directed by Naum Trakhtenberg. The film is an adaptation of Alexandr Pushkin's short story "The Shot" published in 1831.

== Plot ==
The central character of the film is Silvio (played by Mikhail Kozakov), a retired hussar officer whose home is open to officers of the military outpost in a Russian provincial town. Silvio is known as an exceptional marksman and harbors a long-standing desire for revenge. Years earlier, while still in service, he had a conflict with a certain count (Yury Yakovlev), a fortunate and carefree nobleman.

After receiving a slap in the face, Silvio challenged the count to a duel. The count fired first and deliberately missed, only grazing the peak of Silvio’s cap, and waited indifferently for the return shot — calmly eating cherries and spitting out the pits. Offended by his opponent’s disregard for the duel and for death itself, Silvio withheld his shot, resigned from the army, and left for his country estate.

Six years later, Silvio learns that the count is getting married. He sees this as an opportunity to finally settle the score under different circumstances. Shortly after his wedding Silvio claims his right to fire his response shot. When Silvio confronts the count, he sees that the man now has something to lose. Satisfied with this change and the fear it evokes, Silvio chooses not to shoot. Knowing he could have killed the Count, Silvio proceeds to leave the house without taking his revenge.

== Cast ==
- Mikhail Kozakov as Silvio
- Yury Yakovlev
- Ariadna Shengelaya
- Oleg Tabakov as Belkin
- Valeri Babyatinsky as Enseigne (as V. Baryatinsky)
- Vladlen Davydov as Colonel
- Boris Novikov as Kuzka
- Lev Polyakov
