= List of Soviet films of 1984 =

Title	Russian title	Director	Cast	Genre	Notes
1984
Alone and Unarmed	Один и без оружия	Pavel Fattahutdinov, Vladimir Khotinenko	Vasily Mishchenko, Ivan Agafonov, Vsevolod Larionov	Crime	
And Then Came Bumbo...	И вот пришёл Бумбо...	Nadezhda Kosheverova	Oleg Basilashvili, Valeriy Zolotukhin, Tatyana Pelttser	Family	
Another Man's Wife and a Husband under the Bed	Чужая жена и муж под кроватью	Vitaly Melnikov	Oleg Tabakov, Oleg Yefremov, Marina Neyolova, Nikolai Burlyayev, Stanislav Sadalsky, Marina Shimanskaya	Drama	
Applause, Applause...	Аплодисменты, аплодисменты…	Viktor Buturlin	Lyudmila Gurchenko, Oleg Tabakov, Olga Volkova	Musical	
A Rogue's Saga	Прохиндиада, или Бег на месте	Viktor Tregubovich	Aleksandr Kalyagin, Lyudmila Gurchenko, Tatyana Dogileva	Comedy	
The Blonde Around the Corner	Блондинка за углом	Vladimir Bortko	Tatyana Dogileva, Andrey Mironov, Mark Prudkin, Yevgeniya Khanayeva, Yelena Solovey	Romantic comedy	
Chance	Шанс	Aleksandr Mayorov	Sergey Plotnikov	Science fiction	
Copper Angel	Медный ангел	Veniamyn Dorman	Anatoly Kuznetsov, Leonid Kuravlyov, Alim Kouliev, Aleksandr Filippenko	Action	
A Cruel Romance	Жестокий романс	Eldar Ryazanov	Alisa Freindlich, Larisa Guzeeva, Nikita Mikhalkov, Andrey Myagkov, Aleksei Petrenko, Viktor Proskurin	Romantic drama	
Dead Souls	Мёртвые души	Mikhail Shveytser	Aleksandr Trofimov, Aleksandr Kalyagin, Yuri Bogatyryov, Innokenty Smoktunovsky	Comedy, drama	
Dear, Dearest, Beloved, Unique...	Милый, дорогой, любимый, единственный	Dinara Asanova	Olga Mashnaya	Drama	Screened at the 1985 Cannes Film Festival
The Descendant of the Snow Leopard	Ак илбирсти тукуму	Tolomush Okeyev	Dokhdurbek Kydyraliyev	Drama	Entered into the 35th Berlin International Film Festival
Egorka	Егорка	Aleksandr Yanovsky	Mikhail Pugovkin, Gennadiy Frolov, Gennadi Voronin	Adventure	
Extend, Extend, Fascination...	Продлись, продлись, очарованье...	Yaropolk Lapshin	Iya Savvina, Oleg Efremov, Aleftina Evdokimova	Drama	
Formula of Love	Формула любви	Mark Zakharov	Aleksandr Abdulov, Semyon Farada, Leonid Bronevoy, Nodar Mgaloblishvili	Comedy	
The Invisible Man	Человек-невидимка	Aleksandr Zakharov	Andrey Kharitonov, Romualdas Ramanauskas, Leonid Kuravlyov	Science fiction	
I Still Love, I Still Hope	Ещё люблю, ещё надеюсь	Nikolay Lyrchikov	Yevgeny Yevstigneyev, Tamara Syomina, Vyacheslav Nevinnyy	Drama	
Leader	Лидер	Boris Durov	Aleksey Volkov, Aleksandr Strizhenov, Yekaterina Strizhenova	Drama	
Lev Tolstoy	Лев Толстой	Sergey Gerasimov	Sergey Gerasimov, Tamara Makarova, Borivoj Navrátil	Drama	
Love and Pigeons	Любовь и голуби	Vladimir Menshov	Aleksandr Mikhailov, Lyudmila Gurchenko	Romantic comedy	
Mr. Veliky Novgorod	Господин Великий Новгород	Aleksei Saltykov	Oleg Strizhenov, Vyacheslav Yezepov, Zinaida Kirienko	War	
Offered for Singles	Одиноким предоставляется общежитие	Samson Samsonov	Natalya Gundareva, Aleksandr Mikhailov, Tamara Syomina, Yelena Drapeko, Frunzik Mkrtchyan, Viktor Pavlov	Romantic comedy	
Planet Parade	Парад планет	Vadim Abdrashitov	Oleg Borisov, Liliya Gritsenko, Aleksei Zharkov	Drama	
Professor Dowell's Testament	Завещание профессора Доуэля	Leonid Menaker	Olgert Kroders, Igor Vasiliev	Science fiction	
Recollections of Pavlovsk	Воспоминания о Павловске	Irina Kalinina		Documentary	At the 57th Academy Awards it was nominated for Best Documentary Short.
Repentance	Покаяние	Tengiz Abuladze	Avtandil Makharadze	Comedy, drama	Premiered at the 1987 Cannes Film Festival, winning the FIPRESCI Prize, Grand Prize of the Jury, and the Prize of the Ecumenical Jury.
Scarecrow	Чучело	Rolan Bykov	Christina Orbakaite, Yuri Nikulin	Drama	
Skydivers	Парашютисты	Yuri Georgievich Ivanchuk	Aleksandra Yakovleva, Boris Nevzorov, Yelena Yelanskaya	Drama	
Sohni Mahiwal	Легенда о любви	Umesh Mehra, Latif Faiziyev	Sunny Deol, Poonam Dhillon, Pran, Zeenat Aman	Adventure	Soviet-Indian co-production
Success	Успех	Konstantin Khudyakov	Leonid Filatov, Alisa Freindlich, Aleksandr Zbruyev	Drama	
The Tale of Tsar Saltan	Сказка о царе Салтане	Lev Milchin and Ivan Ivanov-Vano	Mariya Vinogradova	Animation	
Time and the Conways	Время и семья Конвей	Vladimir Basov	Rufina Nifontova	Drama	
Time for Rest from Saturday to Monday	Время отдыха с субботы до понедельника	Igor Talankin	Alla Demidova, Vladislav Strzhelchik, Aleksey Batalov	Romantic drama	
Time of Desires	Время желаний	Yuli Raizman	Vera Alentova	Drama	
Vacation of Petrov and Vasechkin, Usual and Incredible	Каникулы Петрова и Васечкина, обыкновенные и невероятные	Vladimir Alenikov	Egor Druzhinin	Musical comedy	
