= Danila Korogodsky =

- Данила Зиновьевич Корогодский
- Born: October 22, 1955 (age 71); Leningrad, USSR
- Education: Leningrad State Institute of Theatre, Music, and Cinema (1977)
- Occupations: stage designer; theatre director; painter
- Years active: 1977—now
- Parents: Zinovy Korogodsky (father); Ludmila Danilina (mother)
- Website: korogodsky.org

Danila Korogodsky (born 22 October 1955 in USSR) is a Russian, American, and European stage designer, theatre director, and painter. He is the son of Zinovy Korogodsky, a Soviet and Russian theatre director and an esteemed Stanislavsky Prize winner.

== Biography ==
Danila Korogodsky was born in 1955 in the family of theatre director Zinovy Korogodsky and playwright Ludmila Danilina. He followed in his parents' footsteps, studied in the Leningrad State Institute of Theatre, Music, and Cinema under Igor Ivanov (class of '77), and later worked as a resident designer at the Theater of Young Spectators (TYS) in Leningrad (the position he held until 1987). Later he also became the principal designer at the Leningrad branch of the All-Russia Creative Workshops.

In 1983, he was chosen as a member of the national delegation at the Prague Quadrennial. Korogodsky also worked as a stage designer in different theatres across the Soviet Union, such as Taganka Theatre in Moscow, Ilkhom Theatre in Tashkent, Mossovet Theatre, and the Tallinn Drama Theater. In 1988, he designed a production of The Petty Bourgeois Wedding by Bertolt Brecht in Bitola, Yugoslavia.

In 1989, Korogodsky traveled to the United States. With an assistance of Nancy Epsen, the head of the California Theater Association, Danila and Zinovy Korogodsky were invited to stage an adaptation of The Little Humpbacked Horse in the Honolulu Theatre for Youth. Danila Korogodsky remained in the US, giving masterclasses and designing shows, while his father returned to Russia and later established a new company Teatr Pokoleniy (The Theater of Generations).

== Theater ==
For more than a quarter century, Korogodsky worked as stage designer and director in theaters in the US, Europe, and Russia. Following his debut in Honolulu, he also сollaborated with the Children's Theatre Company (Minneapolis) Lyric Opera of Chicago, Spoleto Festival USA, The Actors' Gang (Los Angeles), and the American Conservatory Theater, as well as the European institutions, such as Bielefeld Opera, Anhaltisches Theater (Dessau), Theater Bonn, Theater an der Parkaue (Berlin), and Angers-Nantes Opera (France)

Korogodsky also made a career as an educator. He was a professor at Indiana University Bloomington, DePaul University, Chicago, and Ohio State University in Columbus (as an artist-in-residence) and gave lectures at Yale University, New York University, the University of California, Los Angeles, the University of Washington in Seattle, Boston University, and other institutions. From 1996 to 2019, he was the Head of the Stage Design department of California State University, Long Beach and the resident artist of the California Repertory Company. In 2007, he was also invited to teach stage design at the California Institute of the Arts.

Following the death of his father, Zinovy Korogodsky, in 2004, Danila Korogodsky served as the artistic director of Saint Petersburg-based Teatr Pokoleniy. The theater combined education, a creative lab, and a professional theater, and was intended to bring together people of different generations, and this approach was reflected in the name. The acting company of the theater mostly consisted of Zinovy's students, and Danila himself took part in some of the Teatr Pokoleniy's projects.

Around the time of his father's death, Korogodsky took a sabbatical and traveled to Russia to work on a book, and the actors of the Pokoleniy company invited him to take the role of the artistic director of Teatr Pokoleniy. Korogodsky brought his experience in the US and European theaters and combined it with the traditional Russian psychological theater tradition. Later he invited his colleagues from around the world to work on productions: namely Eberhard Köhler (Germany), Adrian Giurgea (USA), Jeffery Eisenmann (USA), Christopher Barreca (USA), Yulya Dukhovny, Grischa Meyer (Germany), Susan Simpson (USA), Henning Bochert (Germany) and Janie Geiser (USA). Korogodsky also launched an improvisation lab in the Teatr Pokoleniy.

Under Korogodsky's management, the theater moved from its old location at the Obukhovskoy Oborony Avenue to the Naryshkin Bastion of the Peter and Paul Fortress at the heart of the city (2006 to 2009) and then to an industrial location at 25 Lakhtinskaya Street. He directed over 30 productions, which were acclaimed by Russian and international critics; the company toured and created joint projects with theatres in Germany and Switzerland, and performed at international festivals. Theater scholar Thomas Irmer described Teatr Pokoleniy as one of the most important independent theatres in Russia.

The notable productions of Teatr Pokoleniy under Korogodsky's lead included "The Lightbulb" (2007), "Питер-Burg" (2010), "Antigone" by Sophocles (2007), "Without Lear" (2005), "The Table" (2009), "The Rooks Have Arrived", "Zoom-Zoom Square" (2018), "The Songs of Love and Death" (2006), "Sans Paroles". "The Pains of Youth" (2006), "An Unfinished Portrait" (2016), "67/871" (2017), and the "The Ghost of Hamlet" (2021).

=== Notable works ===
Over the course of his career, Korogodsky designed more than 300 productions for dramatic theaters and opera houses s in the US, Europe, and Russia. The list of his works includes, but isn't limited to:

- The Little Humpback Horse (Honolulu Theatre for Youth, 1989)
- The Bourgeois Gentilhomme (Merle Reskin Theatre, 1993)
- Curlew River (Japan Society NYC, 1997)
- Die Bürgschaft (1999)
- Ithaka (California Repertory Company's Edison Theatre, 2000)
- Die Vogel (2004)
- Love, Bukowski (California Repertory Company's Studio Theatre, 2005)
- Far away on Lake Chad (The Space of Instinct) (Teatr Pokoleniy, 2008)
- Lost in the Stars (Pittsburgh Opera, 2008)
- SumSum². Endless Confusion of Love and Language (Theater Erlangen, Teatr Pokoleniy, 2010)
- Summer Folk. Future Without a Past (Teatr Pokoleniy, 2012)
- The Pirates of Penzance (Lit Moon Theatre Company, 2014)
- Queenie Pie (Chicago Opera Theater, 2014)
- An American Soldier's Tale (Long Beach Opera, 2014)
- The Glass Menagerie (Westmont's Porter Theatre, 2016)
- Ten Days That Shook the World (Teatr Pokoleniy, 2017)
- Victims of Duty (A Red Orchid Theatre, 2018)
- In the Penal Colony (The Studio Theatre, 2019)
- M — Murderers Among Us (Teatr Pokoleniy und Die Zimmerwäldler, 2019)
- Celestial Nomads (Theater D, 2025)

=== Awards ===
- 2014 — Kennedy Center American College Theater Festival Award for Distinguished Achievement in Scenography (The Pirates of Penzance, Westmont College).

== Art ==
From childhood, Korogodsky learned to draw and paint, and later used these skills to create sketches and conceptual drawings for his productions. His art is closely connected with his theatrical career and family history. The large exhibit of his theater work in memory of his father was presented at the Bakhrushin Museum in Moscow (2016) and then at the Perm Academic Theatre as a part of the Art-Perm art festival and The Space of Direction theater festival (2017).

Another project Korogodsky initially presented in Bakhrushin Museum (2015) and later brought to Perm (2017), titled Black Boxes, reflected on the history of theater and his own experience as a theater director, playwright, and designer. The name of the project referred to both the boxes used to store artifacts left after the production and the theater's stage itself. The installation was built using mockups, models, minifigures, and other objects from the stage design process, as well as the theater decoration elements, costume sketches, posters, etc.

=== Exhibitions ===
- 1980s — "Seasons Finale" (annual exhibitions of the Leningrad-based theater artists), Leningrad.
- 1996 — Schrack! (together with Robert Beckmann), Marjorie Barrick Museum of Art, Las Vegas, USA.
- 2007 — Prague Quadrennial
- 2015 — Black Boxes, Bakrhushin Theater Museum, Moscow Russia
- 2016 — Spots, Blots, and Portraits, Bakrhushin Theater Museum
- 2017 — Spots, Blots, and Portraits and Black Boxes, Perm Academic Theater, Perm, Russia
- 2022 — hermitage.berlin, Berlin, Germany.
- 2025 — artbridge.berlin, Berlin, Germany.

Korogodsky's works are included in private and museum collections.

== Personal life ==
Korogodsky is married. As of 2022, he had four grandchildren. Following the 2022 Russian invasion of Ukraine, Korogodsky moved to Berlin, Germany, with his wife Olga.
