= Alexander Khochinsky =

Soviet actor

- Александр Хочинский
- Khochinsky in 1968
- Born: Alexander Yuryevich Khochinsky; 29 February 1944; Leningrad, RSFSR, Soviet Union
- Died: 11 April 1998 (aged 54); Saint-Petersburg, Russia
- Occupation: Actor
- Years active: 1967–1998
- Spouse: Antonina Shuranova

Alexander Yuryevich Khochinsky (Russian: Алекса́ндр Ю́рьевич Хочи́нский; February 29, 1944 – April 11, 1998) was a Soviet and Russian stage and film actor, bard. Honored Artist of the RSFSR (1980).

== Biography ==
Born into the family of the pop singer Yury Khochinsky (1924–1948) and the leading actress of the Bryantsev Youth Theatre Lyudmila Krasikova (1923–2003).

He graduated from the Saint Peter's School. He played in the Bryantsev Youth Theatre (more than 60 roles in performances of different genres), including the role of Gandalf in the play by Tolkien The Ballad of the Glorious Bilbo Baggins, and Satire Theater on Vasilievsky. Since the 1980s, he worked a lot in entreprise in Moscow and St. Petersburg.

After the expulsion from the Bryantsev Youth Theatre in 1988, the chief director Zinovy Korogodsky left the theater along with many of his students and associates, including his wife Antonina Shuranova. For some time they worked in the small theater Interatelye, then in 1994 they organized the own Globus Theater. Since 1991 he has been an actor at the Lenfilm film studio.

He had excellent vocal skills, sang both in the theater and in the cinema. According to one of the founders of the art song genre in Russia.

He is buried at Serafimovskoe Cemetery.

== Selected filmography ==
- No Path Through Fire (1968) as Red Army soldier
- Bumbarash (1971) as Lyovka Demchenko
- Shadow (1971) as solo singer
- The Woman who Sings (1978) as Valentin Sergeevich
- Squadron of Flying Hussars (1980) as narrator
- The General (1992) as Boris Pasternak
- Life and Adventures of Four Friends 1/2 (1992) as military sailor
