= Playboy Club (disambiguation) =

Playboy Club may refer to:

- Playboy Club, a chain of nightclubs operated by Playboy Enterprises between 1960 and 1991
- Playboy Club, the fan-subscription platform, created by Playboy Enterprises in 2021
- Playboy Club (Las Vegas), a revival of the chain at the Palms Casino Resort
- The Playboy Club, an American television series broadcast on NBC
