= Leonid Kulagin =

Russian actor (born 1940)

- Born: Leonid Nikolaevich Kulagin; 7 June 1940 (age 86); Kirensk, Irkutsk Oblast, Soviet Union
- Occupation: Actor
- Years active: 1960–present

Leonid Nikolaevich Kulagin (Russian: Леони́д Никола́евич Кула́гин; born 1940) is a Soviet and Russian actor, film director, screenwriter. He was awarded the People's Artist of the RSFSR in 1986.

== Selected filmography ==
- 1967 – Beginning of the Unknown Century
- 1969 — A Nest of Gentry
- 1971 – Listen to the Other Side
- 1972 — Privalov's Millions
- 1973 – Cities and Years
- 1974 — Autumn
- 1975 – My Home – Theater
- 1979 – Autumn Story
- 1980 – Karl Marx. Young Years
- 1983 — The Ballad of the Valiant Knight Ivanhoe
- 1984 — Lets the Charms Last Long
- 1985 – Black Arrow
- 1985 — Battle of Moscow
- 1986 — Interception
- 1988 – The Adventures of Quentin Durward, the arrow of the Royal Guard
- 1990 — Afghan Breakdown
- 1991 – Ay! Train Robbery
- 1991 – Shtemp
- 1993 – The Tragedy of the Century
- 2003 – Operational Alias
- 2005 – Red Square
- 2004–2013 – Kulagin and Partners
- 2005 – Star of the Era
- 2005 — Gold Field
- 2006 — Wolfhound
- 2008 – Paradise Apples
- 2009 – Bankrupt
- 2014 – Kuprin. Pit
- 2014 — Ekaterina

== Sound in video games ==
- 2005 — Tom Clancy's Splinter Cell: Chaos Theory — Irving Lambert, NSA
- 2006 — Tom Clancy's Splinter Cell: Double Agent — Irving Lambert, NSA
