= Tolubeyev =

Tolubeyev (Russian: Толубеев) is a Russian surname. Notable people with the surname include:

- Andrei Tolubeyev (1945–2008), Soviet and Russian actor
- Yuri Tolubeyev (1906–1979), Soviet and Russian actor
