= The Pokrovsky Gate =

- Back cover of Russian-language DVD
- Directed by: Mikhail Kozakov
- Written by: Leonid Zorin
- Starring: Oleg Menshikov; Inna Ulyanova; Anatoly Ravikovich; Leonid Bronevoy; Viktor Bortsov
- Cinematography: Nikolay Nemolyayev
- Edited by: Irma Tsekavaya
- Music by: Georgy Garanian; Bulat Okudzhava
- Distributed by: Mosfilm
- Release date: 1982
- Running time: 140 minutes
- Country: Soviet Union
- Language: Russian

The Pokrovsky Gate (Russian: Покровские ворота, romanized: Pokrovskiye Vorota) is a 1982 Soviet musical comedy-drama film produced for television by Mosfilm. It was directed by Mikhail Kozakov and stars Oleg Menshikov, Leonid Bronevoy, and Inna Ulyanova. The screenplay is based on a 1974 stage play by Leonid Zorin.

Featured in the film are three songs written and performed by renowned "bard" Bulat Okudzhava: "Chasovye Lyubvi" ("Sentries of Love"), "Zhivopistsy" ("Painters"), and "Pesenka ob Arbate" ("Ditty about Arbat").

The title refers to a square on Moscow's Boulevard Ring near which the film's main characters reside.

== Plot ==
The story takes place in the 1950s. Konstantin “Kostik” Romin (Oleg Menshikov) has come to Moscow to study history and is staying with kindly aunt Alisa (Sofya Pilyavskaya), who lives in a "communal apartment" building there. His life soon becomes intertwined with those of the other residents. Among them are Margarita Pavlovna (Inna Ulyanova) and both her former husband Lev Khobotov (Anatoly Ravikovich), a publisher of foreign poetry, and her new beau, World War II veteran and engraver-turned-teacher Savva Ignatevich (Viktor Bortsov).

The main plot revolves around the congenial Khobotov’s attempts to find happiness with newfound love Lyudochka (Yelena Koreneva), while constantly being thwarted by the controlling Margarita. Another tenant is musical comedian Arkady Velyurov (Leonid Bronevoy), who is trying to revive his faltering career and escape from his own loneliness. He has become enamored of a young competitive swimmer, Svetlana (Tatyana Dogileva), who rebuffs his advances but takes a fancy to the opportunistic Kostik.

Kostik finds his own love interest, Rita (Valentina Voilkova), for whom he decides to forsake his playboy lifestyle. In the end he becomes the catalyst for both Khobotov and Velyurov to find some measure of happiness: the former elopes with Lyudochka with the help of Kostik's pal Savransky, and the latter is elated that Svetlana attends one of his concerts in response to a telegram Kostik had urged him to send.

== Main idea of the film ==
Gallery

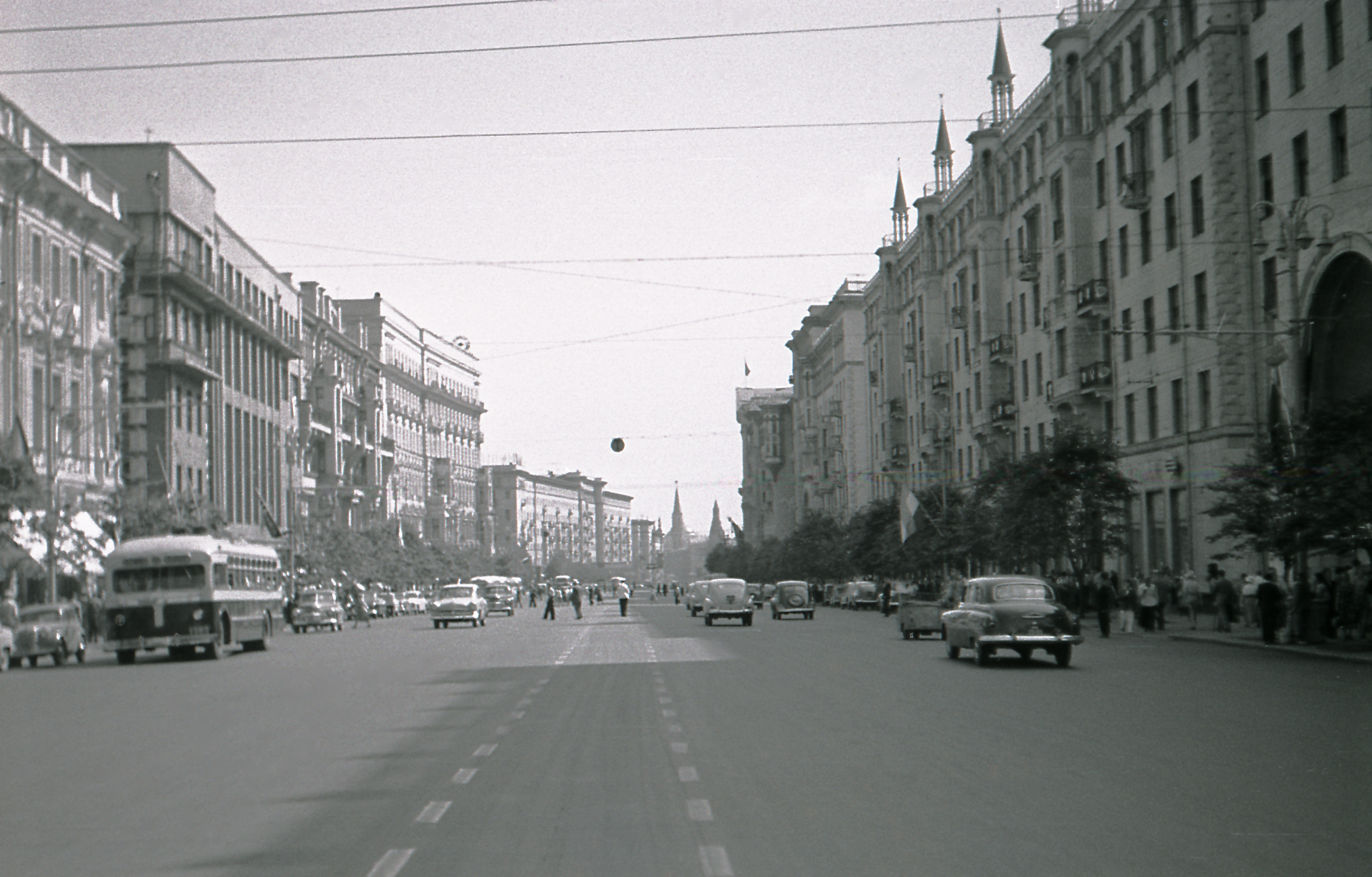
(3) Moscow 1957.
Gorky Street towards Kremlin II.
The main action of the picture takes place in 1956-1957.
"The Pokrovsky Gate" is a film-memory, the hero of which, watching the demolition of an old Moscow house in the early 1980s, mentally returns to the days of his youth.
The main action of the picture takes place in Moscow, period 1956-1957, shown in the photo above (3).

Quotation about the movie:

Скрылись за поворотом пятидесятые, отшумели шестидесятые, уже восьмидесятые проросли. Мы смотрим на развалины скворечника на Покровке с не меньшей грустью, чем режиссёр Михаил Козаков. С улыбкой, но не без горечи, он спрашивает больше себя, чем нас: «Молодость, ты была или не была? Кто ответит, куда ты делась?» (Костик)

---
The fifties disappeared around the bend, the noisy sixties grew silent, the eighties were already sprouting. We look at the ruins of the birdhouse on Pokrovka with no less sadness than the director Mikhail Kozakov. With a smile, but not without bitterness, he asks himself more than us: “Youth, have you been or not? Who will answer, where have you gone? "(Kostik)

— Гербер, Алла Ефремовна (Gerber, Alla Efremovna), Скворечник на Покровке

== Cast ==
see table at left and image above

Actor	Role
1 Yelena Koreneva	Lyudochka
2 Oleg Menshikov	Konstantin “Kostik” Romin
3 Inna Ulyanova	Margarita Pavlovna
4 Viktor Bortsov	Savva Ignatevich
5 Yevgeny Morgunov	Soyev (Velyurov's friend and collaborator)
6 Leonid Bronevoy	Arkadi Velyurov
7 Tatyana Dogileva	Svetlana Popova
8 Valentina Voilkova	Rita
9 Anatoly Ravikovich	Lev Yevgenevich Khobotov

== Other parts ==
- Rimma Markova as doctor
- Igor Dmitriev as Gleb Nikolaevich Orlovich
- Natalia Krachkovskaya as Olga Yanovna Soyeva
- Mikhail Kazakov as Konstantin Romin, after 25 years
- Emmanuil Geller as Savelich (voiced by Georgy Vitsin)
- Sofya Pilyavskaya as aunt Alisa
