= Anatoly Ravikovich =

Russian actor (1936–2012)

- Born: Anatoly Yuryevich Ravikovich; December 24, 1936; Leningrad, USSR
- Died: April 8, 2012 (aged 75); Saint Petersburg, Russia
- Years active: 1958–2012
- Spouse: Irina Mazurkevich

Anatoly Yuryevich Ravikovich (Russian: Анатолий Юрьевич Равикович; December 24, 1936 – April 8, 2012) was a Soviet and Russian actor. He graduated from the Ostrovsky Leningrad Theatre Institute (later LGITMiK) in 1958, and started to work at the Komsomolsk-on-Amur drama theater. In 1962 Ravikovich returned to Leningrad and started to work at the Lensovet Theatre. In 1982 he appeared in Mikhail Kozakov's comedy film The Pokrovsky Gate. He was named a People's Artist of Russia in 1988.

Ravikovich died on April 8, 2012, in Saint Petersburg. He is survived by his wife Irina Mazurkevich, also a People's Artist of Russia.

== Selected filmography ==
- Agony (1974) as supplicant
- The Pokrovsky Gate (1982) as Lev Yevgenevich Khobotov
- The Blonde Around the Corner (1984) as store clerk
- Musketeers Twenty Years After (1992) as Cardinal Mazarin
- The Secret of Queen Anne or Musketeers Thirty Years After (1993) as Cardinal Mazarin
- The Return of the Musketeers, or The Treasures of Cardinal Mazarin (2009) as Cardinal Mazarin
