= The Wind of Travel =

- Russian: Ветер странствий
- Directed by: Yuri Yegorov
- Written by: Yuzef Printsev; Yuri Yegorov
- Starring: Galina Astakhova; Sergei Kuznetsov; Vladimir Marchenko; Yuriy Nazarov; Sergey Yakovlev; Marina Yakovleva
- Cinematography: Aleksandr Machilskiy
- Music by: Mark Fradkin
- Production company: Gorky Film Studio
- Release date: 1978
- Running time: 84 minutes
- Country: Soviet Union
- Language: Russian

The Wind of Travel (Russian: Ветер странствий) is a 1978 Soviet drama film directed by Yuri Yegorov.

== Plot ==
The film takes place during the Great Patriotic War. Mitrash and Nastya were left without parents. The whole village helped them stay alive. And suddenly they receive a letter from which they learn that their father is alive.

== Cast ==
- Galina Astakhova - Nastya
- Sergei Kuznetsov - Mitrasha
- Vladimir Marchenko - Vasiliy
- Yuriy Nazarov - Manuilo
- Sergey Yakovlev - grandad
- Marina Yakovleva - Marfutka
- Alexander Zhdanov - Stepan
