= Inna Ulyanova =

Russian actress and singer

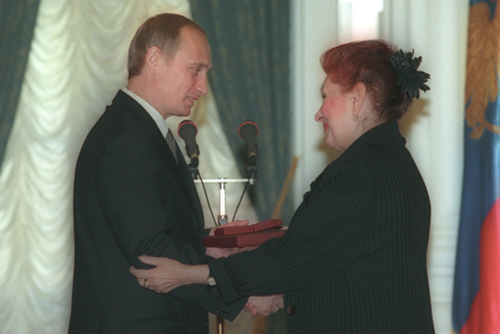
Inna Ulyanova in 2000

Inna Ivanovna Ulyanova (Russian: Инна Ивановна Ульянова; June 30, 1934 – June 9, 2005) was a Soviet and Russian film and stage actress, singer and comic character roles, Honored Artist of the RSFSR (1989), winner of the State Prize of Russian Federation (2000).

== Biography ==
Inna Ulyanova was born on June 30, 1934, in Gorlovka to Ivan Ulyanov (1906–1991) and Anna Ulyanova-Kocherzhenko (1911–2007). In 1957, she graduated from the Boris Shchukin Theatre Institute.

From 1957 to 1963, she served in the Saint Petersburg Comedy Theatre, and in the Taganka Theatre from 1964 to 1993.

The actress died from cirrhosis of the liver on June 9, 2005, in an ambulance. This led Ulyanvova's neighbors to not open the door to the apartment building for a week. She is buried in the Vagankovo cemetery in Moscow.

== Selected filmography ==
- 1956 – Carnival Night
- 1969 – Late Flowers
- 1970 – Passing Through Moscow
- 1972 – Crank from 5th B
- 1973 – Seventeen Moments of Spring
- 1975/94 – Yeralash
- 1976 – A Slave of Love
- 1977/92 – Fitil
- 1982 – The Pokrovsky Gate
- 1984 – Extend, Extend, Fascination...
- 1985 – Do Not Marry, Girls
- 1988 — Where is the Nophelet?
- 1989 – How Dark the Nights Are on the Black Sea
- 1994 – Burnt by the Sun
