= The Brothers Karamazov (1969 film) =

- Directed by: Kirill Lavrov; Ivan Pyryev; Mikhail Ulyanov
- Written by: Ivan Pyryev (screenplay)
- Based on: The Brothers Karamazov; 1880 novel by Fyodor Dostoevsky
- Starring: Mikhail Ulyanov; Lionella Pyryeva; Kirill Lavrov; Andrey Myagkov; Mark Prudkin
- Cinematography: Sergei Vronsky
- Edited by: V. Yankovsky
- Music by: Isaak Shvarts
- Production company: Mosfilm
- Release date: January 10, 1969
- Running time: 232 minutes
- Country: Soviet Union
- Language: Russian

The Brothers Karamazov (Russian: Братья Карамазовы, translit. Bratya Karamazovy) is a 1969 Soviet film directed by Kirill Lavrov, Ivan Pyryev and Mikhail Ulyanov. It is based on the 1880 novel by Fyodor Dostoevsky. It was nominated for the Academy Award for Best Foreign Language Film. It was also entered into the 6th Moscow International Film Festival, winning Pyryev a Special Prize.

== Plot ==
The Karamazov family is gathered around Elder Zosima, a revered monk who mentors Alyosha Karamazov. Dmitri accuses his father of withholding money, claiming he needs it to pursue Grushenka, a woman he's infatuated with. The father counters, alleging Dmitri deceived another woman, Katerina, and is only interested in Grushenka's affections. Tensions rise as both father and son vie for Grushenka. Dmitri, angered, attacks his father, threatening him. Brothers Ivan and Alyosha intervene. Ivan, an intellectual nihilist, opposes their father but rejects violence.

Dmitri was engaged to Katerina. A year ago, she came to him in financial distress, and he wanted to use her for money. When she agreed, hoping to expose his greed, he gave her the money and let her go, showing unexpected generosity. Shortly after, they became engaged, though Dmitri suspected Katerina's true affections lay with Ivan. However, Dmitri abandons Katerina for his love of Grushenka, causing bitterness between Katerina and Grushenka after a confrontation where Grushenka humiliates Katerina deeply. Despite this, Dmitri still owes Katerina money: she once lent him 3000 rubles for his aunt's trip to Moscow, but Dmitri spent it on Grushenka. In a drunken state, he writes to Katerina, claiming he's attempting to gather the money; if he fails, he threatens to harm his father. Dmitri tries unsuccessfully to obtain money from a lawyer and a forester, while Alyosha attempts to persuade their father to provide the money, but he refuses, as he desires Grushenka for himself.

Ivan decides to travel to Moscow, partly because he's resolved his feelings for Katerina. His father's servant, Smerdyakov, suggests this move. It becomes evident that Smerdyakov thinks Dmitri intends to kill their father, as Smerdyakov has informed Dmitri about the 3000 rubles the father has for Grushenka. By leaving for Moscow, Ivan can avoid being implicated in the murder. Horrified, Ivan agrees to leave the next morning. Meanwhile, Grushenka is summoned by her ex-husband, Samsonov. She departs without bidding farewell to Dmitri, claiming her love for him was short-lived. Furious and believing she's chosen his father, Dmitri storms to him. Shortly afterward, he shows up at Grushenka's residence, where her servants reveal her true whereabouts to him.

Dmitri goes to visit Grushenka and Samsonov, who are staying at an inn in a village. He drives Samsonov away and spends the evening enjoying music and dance with Grushenka. In a moment of solitude, he prays for the recovery of the person he harmed, hoping they are still alive. The innkeeper overhears his prayer and calls the police, leading to Dmitri's arrest. He denies killing his father, admitting only to intending to out of jealousy but ultimately changing his mind. The blood on his hands is from Smerdyakov, whom he struck down in the garden. The money found on him is from Katerina, not his father. Dmitri is imprisoned, and Grushenka pledges to wait for him. Alyosha, believing in Dmitri's innocence, visits him in prison. Meanwhile, Ivan visits the sick Smerdyakov, who confesses to Ivan that he murdered their father on Ivan's orders, as they had discussed before Ivan's departure. Smerdyakov insists that Ivan take the money hidden in the house, revealing himself as Ivan's half-brother. Horrified, Ivan plans to bring Smerdyakov to court the next day, taking some responsibility for the crime.

Upon returning to his apartment, Ivan's delusions manifest as he perceives himself confronting the devil incarnate. Alyosha interrupts his visions to deliver the news of Smerdyakov's suicide. At Dmitri's trial the following day, initial prospects for acquittal seem promising. Katerina paints a favourable picture of her relationship with Dmitri, omitting the incriminating drunken letter threatening murder. Grushenka implicates Smerdyakov as the murderer while also casting doubt on Katerina. Ivan confesses to instigating Smerdyakov's act of patricide. Amidst Ivan's apparent breakdown, he is removed from the courtroom, and Katerina seizes the opportunity to present the damning letter to the judge. Dmitri's defense falls short, leading to his conviction and subsequent sentencing to hard labour in Siberia. Grushenka accompanies him in solidarity.

== Cast ==
- Mikhail Ulyanov as Dmitri Karamazov
- Lionella Pyryeva as Grushenka
- Kirill Lavrov as Ivan Karamazov
- Andrey Myagkov as Alyosha Karamazov
- Mark Prudkin as Fyodor Pavlovich Karamazov
- Svetlana Korkoshko as Yekaterina Ivanovna
- Valentin Nikulin as Pavel Smerdyakov
- Pavel Pavlenko as elder Zosima
- Andrei Abrikosov as Kuzma Kuzmich Samsonov
- Gennadi Yukhtin as Father Paisi
- Anatoly Adoskin as Examining magistrate
- Rada Volshaninova as Gipsy
- Tamara Nosova as Marya Kondratyevna
- Nikita Podgorny as Mikhail Osipovich Rakitin
- Ivan Lapikov as Lyagavyj

== Reception ==
The film was the most popular movie at the USSR box office in 1969.

== See also ==
- List of submissions to the 42nd Academy Awards for Best Foreign Language Film
- List of Soviet submissions for the Academy Award for Best Foreign Language Film
