= Blasted Hell =

1967 Soviet action film

Spring on the Oder
- Russian: Взорванный ад
- Directed by: Ivan Lukinsky
- Written by: Afanasi Salynsky
- Starring: Gennadiy Bortnikov; Nikolai Skorobogatov; Imedo Kakhiani; Aleksandr Novikov; Sergey Yakovlev
- Cinematography: Vadim Kornilyev
- Music by: Leonid Afanasyev
- Release date: 1967
- Country: Soviet Union
- Language: Russian

Spring on the Oder (Russian: Взорванный ад) is a 1967 Soviet action film directed by Ivan Lukinsky.

== Plot ==
The film takes place during the Second World War. The Germans are preparing sabotage groups from among Soviet prisoners of war from a concentration camp to send them to the Soviet Union. One of them decides to interfere with their plans...

== Cast ==
- Gennadiy Bortnikov as Nikolay Berezhnikov
- Nikolai Skorobogatov as Lifanov (as N. Skorobogatov)
- Imedo Kakhiani as Archil Tatishvili (as I. Kakhiani)
- Aleksandr Novikov as Mandrykin (as A. Novikov)
- Sergey Yakovlev as Ivan Besavkin (as S. Yakovlev)
- Olev Eskola as Anberg (as O. Eskola)
- Heino Mandri as Emar (as H. Mandri)
- Yevgeni Burenkov as Voronin
