= Antonina Shuranova =

Russian actress (1936–2003)

- Антонина Шуранова
- Born: 30 April 1936; Sevastopol, Soviet Union
- Died: 5 February 2003 (aged 66); St. Petersburg, Russia
- Occupation: Actress
- Years active: 1962—2003
- Spouse: Alexander Khochinsky

Antonina Nikolayevna Shuranova (Russian: Антони́на Никола́евна Шура́нова, 1936–2003) was a Russian stage, television and film actress.

== Partial filmography ==
- War and Peace (1966–1967, part 1-5) as Princess Maria Bolkonskaya
- On the Way to Berlin (1969) as Tatyana Mikhaylovna
- Tchaikovsky (1970) as Nadezhda von Meck
- Matters of the Heart (1974) as Lida
- Strange Adults (1974, TV Movie) as Nina Ivanovna
- Trust (1976) as Rosa Luxemburg
- An Unfinished Piece for Mechanical Piano (1977) as Anna Petrovna Voynitseva
- Strict Male Life (1977) as Tamara Stepanovna Klyonova
- Engineer Graftio (1979) as Antonina Graftio
- Since We Are Together (1983) as Antonina Petrovna
- Women's Club (1987) as Maya Sablina
- Everyone Loves Someone (1988) as Klavdiya Ivanovna
- Do You Remember the Smell of Lilac... (1992) as Vera Lvovna
- June 22, at Exactly 4 am... (1992) as Tanya's mother
- Streets of Broken Lights (1998) as Maria Pavlovna Leonidova

== Awards ==
- Honored Artist of the RSFSR (January 30, 1974)
- People's Artist of the RSFSR (August 20, 1980)

== Bibliography ==
- Rollberg, Peter. Historical Dictionary of Russian and Soviet Cinema. Scarecrow Press, 2008.
