= Playgirl (disambiguation) =

Playgirl is an adult magazine.

Playgirl or Play Girl may also refer to:

== Film and television ==
- The Play Girl, a 1928 American film directed by Arthur Rosson
- Play Girl (1932 film), an American film directed by Ray Enright
- Play Girl (1941 film), an American film directed by Frank Woodruff
- Playgirl (1954 film), an American film directed by Joseph Pevney
- Playgirl (1966 film), a West German film directed by Will Tremper
- Playgirl (TV series), a 1969–1976 Japanese action/drama series

== Music ==
- Playgirl (album), by Rina Aiuchi, 2004, also the first song on the album
- "Playgirl" (song), by Ladytron, 2000
- "Play Girl", a track on the album Girls, the 2019 debut album by Yung Baby Tate

== See also ==
- Playgirlz, an album by After School, 2012
- Playboy (disambiguation)
- Playmates (disambiguation)
