= Alexander Zhdanov =

Russian actor (1951–2021)

- Born: 25 January 1951
- Died: 21 February 2021 (aged 70); Saint Petersburg, Russia
- Occupation: Actor

Alexander Zhdanov (Russian: Александр Жданов; 25 January 1951 – 21 February 2021) was a Russian actor who was a Merited Artist of the Russian Federation.

== Biography ==
Zhdanov graduated from the Leningrad Conservatory in 1974 and became an actor at the Liteyny Theatre. He also acted in many films.

Alexander Zhdanov died in Saint Petersburg on 21 February 2021, at the age of 70.

== Filmography ==
- Monologue (1972)
- The Tobacco Captain (1972)
- Failure of Engineer Garin (1973)
- A vy ljubili kogda-nibud'? (1973)
- The Last Summer of Childhood (1974)
- Diary of a School Director (1975)
- Truffaldino from Bergamo (1976)
- Proshlogodnyaya kadril (1978)
- Pugachev (1978)
- The Wind of Travel (1978)
- Say a Word for the Poor Hussar (1981)
- Vzyat zhivym (1982)
- Charlotte's Necklace (1984)
- Sekretniy farvater (1986)
- Russian Symphony (1994)
- Agent natsionalnoy bezopasnosti (2000)
- Streets of Broken Lights (2000)
- Krik Tishiny (2019)
