= A Nest of Gentry (film) =

- Russian: Дворянское гнездо
- Directed by: Andrey Konchalovsky
- Written by: Valentin Ezhov; Andrey Konchalovsky; Ivan Turgenev
- Starring: Irina Kupchenko; Leonid Kulagin; Beata Tyszkiewicz; Tamara Chernova; Viktor Sergachyov; Vasili Merkuryev
- Cinematography: Georgy Rerberg
- Edited by: L. Pokrovskaya; Valentina Oleynik
- Music by: Vyacheslav Ovchinnikov
- Production company: Mosfilm
- Release date: 1969
- Running time: 111 min.
- Country: Soviet Union
- Language: Russian

A Nest of Gentry (Russian: Дворянское гнездо, romanized: Dvoryanskoe gnezdo) is a 1969 Soviet romantic drama film directed by Andrey Konchalovsky.

== Plot ==
Fyodor Ivanovich Lavretsky returns to his estate after 11 years in Paris, in which his wife remained. Frustrated by life, deceived by his wife who had cheated on him, exhausted by a long separation from Russia this is how the hero looks at the beginning of the film. Soon, Lavretsky falls in love with his charming young cousin's daughter, Lisa. After some time, Lavretsky learns from the newspapers about the death of his wife in Paris. The declaration of love to Lisa and the simultaneous arrival of the suddenly risen wife's estate complicate a seemingly simple story.

== Cast ==
- Irina Kupchenko as Liza
- Leonid Kulagin as Lavretsky
- Beata Tyszkiewicz as Varvara Pavlovna
- Tamara Chernova as Maria Dmitriyevna
- Viktor Sergachyov as Panshin
- Vasili Merkuryev as Gedeonovsky
- Aleksandr Kostomolotsky as Lemm
- Mariya Durasova as Marfa Timofeyevna
- Vladimir Kochurikhin as Anton
- Sergey Nikonenko as Grishka
- Nikita Mikhalkov as Prince Nelidov
- Nikolay Gubenko as Sitnikov
- Nonna Terentyeva as Justine

== Awards ==
- 1973 Jussi Award
  - Best foreign director (Andrey Konchalovsky)
