= Behind Closed Doors (2022 film) =

- Directed by: Anton Maslov
- Written by: Mariya Maslova; Anton Maslov
- Produced by: Eduard Iloyan; Denis Zhalinsky; Aleksey Trotsyuk; Vitaly Shlyappo; Mikhail Tkachenko; Natalya Kurenkova
- Starring: Darya Shcherbakova; Denis Nikiforov; Natalya Shvets; Yevgeny Antropov; Natalya Zemtsova; Tatyana Dogileva
- Cinematography: Sergey Komarov Jr.
- Edited by: Kirill Abramov
- Music by: Ivan Kanaev; Denis Vorontsov
- Production company: START Studio
- Distributed by: All Media
- Release date: February 24, 2022
- Running time: 99 minutes
- Country: Russia
- Language: Russian

Behind Closed Doors (Russian: Многоэтажка, romanized: Mnogoetazhka, lit. 'High-rise building') is a 2022 Russian crime drama film directed by Anton Maslov.

== Plot ==
The film follows firefighter Anton Kalashnikov as he raises his 14-year-old daughter, Kira, who spends weekends with him. Their Saturdays typically involve her dance classes, followed by an evening together watching TV and sharing dinner. However, one evening, things take a dark turn: Kira rings the intercom, and Anton, after a heavy day and a difficult conversation about his ex-wife’s plan to take Kira to the U.S., lets her in before falling asleep. When he wakes, Kira is nowhere to be found, setting off a frantic search within their apartment building. As Anton questions the neighbors and uncovers clues, he learns Kira may have argued with friends and was seen with a teacher, Vanya, who once faced troubling accusations. In a final attempt to find her, Anton starts a fire to prompt an evacuation. The film’s climax reveals a dramatic rescue, with Kira narrowly escaping the flames and later asking to continue seeing her father, even with her mother’s planned move.

== Cast ==
- Darya Shcherbakova as Kira Kalashnikova
- Denis Nikiforov as Anton Kalashnikov, Kira's father
- Natalya Shvets as Viktoria "Vika" Kalashnikova, Kira's mother
- Yevgeny Antropov as Vanya
- Natalya Zemtsova as Masha, Vanya's sister
- Tatyana Dogileva as Tamara, the eldest at the entrance
- Mariya Karpova as Olya Petrova, a neighbor from 182 apartments
- Andrey Shibarshin as Petrov, a neighbor from 182 apartments
- Dmitry Lysenkov as Artur, a neighbor from 165 apartments
- Azamat Nigmanov as Jora, a neighbor from 175 apartments
- Pavel Vorozhtsov as A Family Man, a neighbor from 178 apartments
- Artur Vakha as An Elevator Operator, CCTV operator
- Nikolay Shrayber as Stepan
- Nikoletta Shonus as Natasha Dryagina, Kira's best friend
- Anna Kotova as Natasha's Mother, a neighbor from 155 apartments
- Mikhail Zhigalov as Fyodor
- Igor Savochkin as The Neighbor
