= Bumbarash =

1971 musical comedy film

- Directed by: Abram Naroditsky; Nikolai Rasheyev
- Written by: Yevgeni Mitko; Arkady Gaidar (novel); Yuliy Kim (lyrics)
- Produced by: Vladimir Knyazev
- Starring: Valeri Zolotukhin; Yekaterina Vasilyeva; Yuri Smirnov; Lev Durov; Roman Tkachuk
- Cinematography: Vitaly Zimovets; Boris Myasnikov
- Music by: Vladimir Dashkevich
- Production company: Dovzhenko Film Studio
- Release date: 1971
- Running time: 135 minutes
- Country: Soviet Union
- Language: Russian

Bumbarash (Russian: «Бумбараш», romanized: Bumbarash) is a 1971 Soviet adventure film, a musical comedy in two episodes loosely based on some early works and the novel Bumbarash by Arkady Gaidar.

During the Russian Civil War, former Imperial Russian Army Private Bumbarash, formerly a prisoner of war in Austria, is returning to his home village, where all, including his beloved girlfriend, believe he is dead. Control of the village periodically changes between the Whites, Reds and "bandits". Bumbarash tries to survive in this chaos and to return to his love.

== Plot ==
In the chaos of the Russian Civil War, soldier Semyon Bumbara returns home from an Austrian World War I prison camp, where he was captured during a reconnaissance mission on a balloon. When he arrives, he finds that his village has long believed him dead, and his love, Varya, has married Gavrila, the head of the local militia, which borders on banditry. Power in the region frequently shifts between Red Army forces, White forces, and Green partisans. Though Bumbara's friend Yashka suggests he join the Red Army, Bumbara insists he’s done with fighting. Chaos ensues when Yashka bombs Gavrila's home, and Varya helps Bumbara escape, giving him a coat that turns out to belong to a fallen Red Army commissar, which leads to Bumbara’s arrest by the Reds on suspicion of murder. He escapes, only to encounter a gang led by the ruthless Sofya, accompanied by Gavrila. As Bumbara flees, he discovers that the miller who gave him refuge is linked to the bandits and witnesses Yashka's tragic execution.

In the forest, Bumbara meets another wanderer, Levka, and they devise a plan to lure Sofya’s gang to the mill, where they hope to ambush them with the Red Army’s help. Though they succeed, it turns out they have targeted the wrong group. Later, Bumbara and Levka formally join the Red Army and, after a brief reunion with Varya, head to the front. A White Army ambush kills most of their unit, leaving Bumbara as the lone survivor sent back with a message. Along the way, he kills a White Army guard with crucial information and narrowly escapes a second encounter. Returning to his village, he finds Sofya plotting an attack and poisoning the village well. The Red Army stages an illness to bait her, leading to a brutal confrontation that ends in her death. Gavrila flees with Varya, but Bumbara, breaking from custody, catches up to him; Gavrila tragically kills Varya before he is captured. In the final scene, Bumbara is seen alone, raising a revolver in the sand quarry as a single shot echoes.

== Cast ==
- Valeri Zolotukhin as Bumbarash
- Yekaterina Vasilyeva as Sofia Nikolayevna
- Yuri Smirnov as Gavrila
- Lev Durov as the Miller
- Roman Tkachuk as Commissar Zaplatin
- Natalya Dmitriyeva as Varvara
- Aleksandr Khochinsky as Lyovka Demchenko
- Aleksandra Belina as Yashka
- Leonid Bakshtayev as Chubatov
- Nikolay Dupak as Sovkov
- Margarita Krinitsyna as Seraphima
- Lev Perfilov as Melaniy, Bumbarash's brother
- Yuri Sherstnyov as episode
- Aleksandr Filippenko (cameo appearance)
- Lev Okrent (cameo appearance as Lyon)
- Osip Naiduk as bandit
