= Playmates =

Playmates or Playmate may refer to:

- Partner in play
- Playboy Playmate, a female model featured in the centerfold/gatefold of Playboy

== Film and television ==
- Playmates (1915 film), directed by Mauritz Stiller
- Playmates (1918 film), starring Oliver Hardy
- Playmates (Around the Town), a 1922 British short film
- Playmates (1921 film), starring Diana Serra Cary
- Playmates (1941 film), starring Kay Kyser
- Playmates (1972 film), written by Richard Baer
- "Playmates" (Bewitched), a 1968 television episode

== Music ==
- "Playmates" (song), ostensibly written by Saxie Dowell in 1940
- The Playmates, a 50's music group
- Playmates (album), an album by Small Faces in 1977

== Novels ==
- Playmates, a 1987 novel by Andrew Neiderman
- Playmates (novel), published in 1989 by Robert B. Parker

== Organizations ==
- Playmates Toys, a toy manufacturer, subsidiary of Playmates Holdings Ltd
- Playmates Interactive, a video game publisher and subsidiary of Playmates Toys

== See also ==
- List of Playboy Playmates of the Month
- Playboy (disambiguation)
- Playgirl (disambiguation)
