= Adam's Rib (1991 film) =

- Russian: Ребро Адама
- Directed by: Vyacheslav Krishtofovich
- Written by: Vyacheslav Krishtofovich; Vladimir Kunin; Anatoli Kurchatkin
- Produced by: Yuriy Kushneryov
- Starring: Inna Churikova; Yelena Bogdanova; Svetlana Ryabova; Maria Golubkina; Andrei Tolubeyev
- Cinematography: Pavel Lebeshev
- Edited by: Inessa Brozhovskaya
- Music by: Vadim Khrapachyov
- Production company: Mosfilm
- Release date: January 1991
- Running time: 79 min
- Country: Soviet Union
- Language: Russian

Adam's Rib (Russian: Ребро Адама, romanized: Rebro Adama) is a 1991 Soviet tragicomedy film directed by Vyacheslav Krishtofovich. The film tells about the life of the Soviet family. The grandmother is sick and needs attention, the mother still can not establish personal life, and the two daughters are full of problems.

== Plot ==
Set in late-1980s Moscow, the story follows Nina Elizarovna, a museum guide living in a small apartment with her two adult daughters and bedridden mother, who is paralyzed but can still move her left hand and head. Life is challenging; Nina juggles work, caring for her ailing mother, and trying to secure a future for her daughters. At the museum, Nina meets a visiting engineer, Evgeny Anatolyevich, and the two form a connection. However, when she brings him home to meet her family, her mother rings a bell to disrupt their evening, forcing Nina to send Evgeny away and sparking tension between mother and daughter. Meanwhile, Nina’s older daughter Lida faces heartbreak after discovering that her boss, with whom she has a secret affair, has left on vacation with another woman. Her younger daughter, fifteen-year-old Nastya, learns she is pregnant and, after a tense confrontation, breaks up with her boyfriend, Mikhail.

For her mother’s birthday, Nina invites both her ex-husbands and Evgeny. The gathering starts well but soon devolves into arguments, with Nastya announcing her pregnancy, and a drunken Mikhail arriving to make a scene. Evgeny intervenes, and eventually, the men leave. Late that night, Nina and her daughters sit in the kitchen discussing how to arrange a room for the new baby. In her room, their grandmother attempts to summon them by ringing her bell, only to accidentally hit herself in the forehead with it. Shocked, she realizes her paralysis is gone. She enters the room where the family had gathered and begins singing an old romance song. Drawn by her voice, the family enters one by one, marveling at her unexpected recovery.

== Cast ==
- Inna Churikova as Nina
- Yelena Bogdanova as grandmother
- Svetlana Ryabova as Lidiya
- Maria Golubkina as Nastya
- Andrei Tolubeyev as Yevgeny Anatolievich
- Andrei Kasyanov as Misha
- Stanislav Zhitaryov as Andrei Pavlovich
- Igor Kvasha as Alexander Naumovich Goldberg, Nina's second husband
- Rostislav Yankovsky as Viktor Vitalievich, Nina's first husband
- Galina Kazakova as Marina

== Awards ==
- Nika Award for Best Actress (Inna Churikova)
