= Sergei Yakovlev (actor) =

Russian actor

- Сергей Яковлев
- Born: Sergei Sergeyevich Yakovlev; 4 August 1925; Kurgan, Ural Oblast, Russian Soviet Federative Socialist Republic, Soviet Union
- Died: 1 January 1996 (aged 70); Moscow, Russia
- Occupation: Actor
- Years active: 1952–1992
Awards
Order of the Patriotic War (2nd class)	Order of Glory	Medal "For Courage"	Medal "For the Victory over Germany in the Great Patriotic War 1941–1945"

Sergei Sergeyevich Yakovlev (Russian: Сергей Сергеевич Яковлев; 4 August 1925 – 1 January 1996) was a Soviet and Russian stage, film and television actor. He appeared in more than forty films from 1957 to 1992.

== Selected filmography ==
Year	Title	Role
1956	A Weary Road	Vasili Kruglikov
1957	The Communist	Denis Ivanovich
1957	The Sisters	Vasily Rublyov
1960	Five Days, Five Nights	Soviet officer
1965	The Salvos of the Aurora Cruiser	Vladimir Antonov-Ovseenko
1967	Blasted Hell	Ivan Besavkin
1968	The Shield and the Sword	doctor
1974	Countermeasure	engineer Firs
1976	The Ascent	Pyotr Sych, village elder
1976	The Twelve Chairs	episode
1978	The Wind of Travel	grandpa Onisim
1979	Stalker	Professor (voice, played by Nikolai Grinko)
1979	Air Crew	chairman of the aircraft rescue meeting
1987	Once Lied	Ivan Semyonovich
