= Mark Prudkin =

Soviet and Russian actor

- Марк Прудкин
- Born: 13 September 1898; Klin, Moscow Governorate, Russian Empire
- Died: 24 September 1994 (aged 96); Moscow, Russia
- Resting place: Novodevichy Cemetery, Moscow
- Occupation: Actor
- Spouse: Yekaterina Prudkina

Mark Isaakovich Prudkin (Russian: Марк Исаакович Прудкин; 13 September 1898 – 24 September 1994) was a Soviet and Russian stage and film actor, People's Artist of the USSR (1961), Hero of Socialist Labour (1989), and multiple times a Laureate of three Stalin Prizes first degree (1946, 1947, 1949).

== Biography ==
Mark Isaakovich Prudkin was born on 1 September (13), 1898 (according to other sources – 2 September (14), 1898) in the town of Klin (now the Moscow Region) in the family of tailor Isaak Lvovich Prudkin (1871–1949) and musician Rakhil Lazarevna Prudkina (maiden name - Sot, 1880–1945).

He became interested in theater while still studying in the Klin Realschule, took part in amateur theater performances. From 1918 to 1924 he was a student and actor in the 2nd Studio of the Moscow Art Theater (in parallel from 1918 to 1919 he studied at the Faculty of Law of Moscow State University).

Since 1924, Mark Prudkin worked in the Moscow Art Theatre (since 1989 - in the Moscow Art Theater named after Chekhov).

In the studio, he especially succeeded in the roles of the heroic-romantic type - Karl Moor, "The Robbers" by Friedrich Schiller (1923), Don Luis in "The Invisible Lady Calderon" (1924), Chatsky in "Woe from Wit" by Alexander Griboedov (1925). Over time, the creative range of Prudkin expanded, which contributed to his talent of transformation, the ability to delve into the psychological essence of the created image, attention to external attributes – costume, makeup, facial expressions. All this allowed the actor to show on the stage a variety of characters, sometimes opposite in character, such as the frivolous adjutant Shervinsky, "The Days of the Turbins" by Mikhail Bulgakov (1926), the gloomy captain Nezelasov, "Armored train 14–69" by Vsevolod Ivanov (1927), the self-confident and cowardly Kastalsky, "The Fear" by Alexander Afinogenov (1932), Vronsky (1937) and Karenin (1957) in "Anna Karenina" by Leo Tolstoy, Dulchin, The Last Victim by Nikolai Ostrovsky (1946), ambitious careerist engineer Mehti-Aga, "Deep exploration" by Alexander Kron, Fyodor Karamazov, "The Brothers Karamazov" by Fyodor Dostoyevsky (1961), Baker, "The Winter of our Discontent" based on the novel by John Steinbeck (1964).

Together with Olga Androvskaya and other "great old men" of the Moscow Art Theater – Alexey Gribov, Viktor Stanitsyn and Mikhail Yanshin played in a specially staged for them famous play "Solo for Clock Chime" based on the play by Osvald Zahradník (1973). In 1983, he played Pontius Pilate in the play "The Candle Ball" based on the novel by Mikhail Bulgakov "The Master and Margarita", staged by his son, Vladimir Prudkin.

In 1969, The Brothers Karamazov was released, with Mark Prudkin in the role of Fyodor Karamazov – the same one that he played on stage. Apart from a tiny episode in the silent film by Yakov Protazanov Man from the Restaurant, it was his first role in the cinema at the age of 71. He played small but memorable roles in the films The Twelve Chairs, The Blonde Around the Corner, Autumn Wind, in the television movie Uncle's Dream by Fyodor Dostoyevsky and others.

In 1943, Mark Prudkin was one of the supervisors of the Moscow Art Theater – the artistic and director's union, which consisted of five people.

In 1987, a gramophone record was released with records of fragments of the best works by Mark Prudkin in recent years in the theater, on television and radio.

He lived in Moscow, in Glinischevsky Lane, house 5/7.

Mark Isaakovich Prudkin died on 24 September 1994 at the age of 96, 75 of which he devoted to the theater. He was buried in Moscow at the Novodevichy Cemetery (site No. 10).

== Personal life ==
Prudkin was married to Ekaterina Ivanovna Prudkina (1918–2007). She was an assistant director (MAT), and Honored Worker of Culture of the RSFSR (1975).

Prudkin had a son, Vladimir Prudkin, filmmaker, who lives in Europe and Israel, and a grandson, Lev Prudkin, filmmaker.

== Honors and awards ==
- Honored Artist of the RSFSR (1933)
- People's Artist of the USSR (1961)
- Hero of Socialist Labour (18 August 1989) – for outstanding achievements in the development of Soviet theatrical art
- Two Orders of Lenin (1948, 1989)
- Order of the October Revolution (1978)
- Order of the Red Banner of Labour (1973)
- Order of Friendship of Peoples (1983)
- Order of the Badge of Honour (1937)
- Medal "For the Defence of Moscow" (1946)
- Medal "For Valiant Labour in the Great Patriotic War 1941–1945" (1946)
- Stalin Prize first degree (1946) – for the performance of the role of engineer Mehti-aga in the performance "Deep exploration" by A. A. Kron
- Stalin Prize first degree (1947) – for the performance of the role of Krivenko in the play "The Winners" by Boris F. Chirskov
- Stalin Prize first degree (1949) – for the role of Krutilin in the play "Green Street" by A. A. Surov
- Stanislavsky State Prize of the RSFSR (1974) – for high performing skills in the play "Solo for Clock Chime" O. Zahradnik

== Theatre ==
- 1918 – "The Green Ring" by Zinaida Gippius – Volodya
- 1918 – "The Pattern of Roses" by Fyodor Sologub – Priklonsky
- 1923 – "The Robbers" by Friedrich Schiller – Karl Moor
- 1924 – "Invisible Lady" by Pedro Calderon – Don Lewis
- 1925 – "Woe from Wit" by Alexander Griboedov – Alexander Chatsky
- 1925 – "Pugachevshchina" by Konstantin Trenev – Lysov
- 1926 – "The Days of the Turbins" by Mikhail Bulgakov – Leonid Shervinsky
- 1926 – "Nicholas I and the Decembrists" by Alexander Kugel – Prince Golitsyn
- 1927 – "Armored train 14–69" by Vsevolod Ivanov – Captain Nezelasov
- 1929 – "Mad Day, or The Marriage of Figaro" by Pierre Beaumarchais – Figaro
- 1930 – "Resurrection" by Leo Tolstoy – Prosecutor Breve
- 1931 – "The Fear" by Alexander Afinogenov – Kastalsky
- 1933 – "Talents and Admirers" by Alexander Ostrovsky – Grigory Bakin
- 1935 – "The Enemies" by Maxim Gorky – Mikhail Skrobotov
- 1937 – "Anna Karenina" by Leo Tolstoy – Count Alexei Vronsky
- 1941 – "Scandalous School" by Richard Sheridan – Sir Joseph Serfes
- 1942 – "Front" of Alexander Korneichuk – Gaidar
- 1943 – "Deep exploration" of Alexander Kron – Mehti-Aga
- 1944 – "The Last Victim" by Alexander Ostrovsky – Vadim Dulchin
- 1948 – "The Green Street" by Anatoly Surov – Krutilin
- 1951 – "The Lost House" by Sergei Mikhalkov – Ustinov
- 1952 – "The Volley of the Aurora" by Manuel Bolshintsov and Mikhail Chiaureli – Alexander Kerensky
- 1953 – "Summer Residents" by Maxim Gorky – Sergei Basov
- 1956 – "Kremlin chimes" by Nikolai Pogodin – English writer
- 1957 – "Anna Karenina" by Leo Tolstoy – Alexei Karenin
- 1957 – "The Golden Carriage" by Leonid Leonov – Nikolai Kareev
- 1960 – "The Brothers Karamazov" by Fyodor Dostoevsky – Fyodor Karamazov
- 1961 – "The Master" I. Sobolev – Kruglakovsky
- 1963 – "Egor Bulychov and Others" by Maxim Gorky – Vasily Dostigayev
- 1964 – "Winter of our Anxiety" by Joseph Steinbeck – Baker
- 1971 – "The Last" by Maxim Gorky – Yakov Kolomiytsev
- 1973 – "Enough Stupidity in Every Wise Man" by Alexander Ostrovsky – Krutitsky
- 1973 – "Solo for Clock Chime" Osvald Zahradník – Pan Hmelik
- 1976 – "Ivanov" by Anton Chekhov – Count Matvey Shabelsky
- 1977 – "Chekhov pages" based on the plays and stories by Anton Chekhov – Svetlovidov
- 1979 – "It's Over" by Edward Olby – Friend
- 1982 – "The Living Corpse" by Leo Tolstoy – Sergei Abrezkov
- 1983 – "Candle Ball" by Georgiy Epifantsev for Mikhail Bulgakov's "Master and Margarita" – Pontius Pilate

== Filmography ==
- 1927 – Man from the Restaurant – the officer
- 1969 – The Brothers Karamazov – Fyodor Karamazov
- 1970 – The Strokes to the Portrait of V. I. Lenin – Dr. V.M. Minz
- 1970 – Kremlin Chimes – Yegor Dmitriyevich Nikolsky
- 1971 – Day after Day – Victor Bogdanov
- 1974 – Take Aim – Albert Einstein (uncredited)
- 1975 – Swan Song (short film) – actor
- 1976 – The Twelve Chairs – Bartholomew Korobeinikov
- 1983 – Two Chapters from the Family Chronicle – Gammer
- 1983 – The Blonde Around the Corner – Gavrila Maksimovich Poryvaev, Nikolai's father (voiced by Zinovy Gerdt)
- 1984 – Lost in the Sands – old man
- 1986 – Autumn Wind – Georges

== Teleplays ==
- 1962 – The Seventh Satellite – Priklonsky
- 1967 – The Kremlin Chimes – a foreign writer
- 1969 – Yegor Bulychov and Others – Vasily Dostigayev
- 1972 – The Enemies – Mikhail Skrobotov
- 1972 – The Last – Yakov
- 1974 – Solo for Clock Chime – Hmelik
- 1976 – Maria Stuart – George Talbot, Earl of Shrewsbury
- 1976 – Enough Stupidity in Every Wise Man – Krutitsky
- 1977 – Chekhov Pages – Vasil Vasilich Svetlovidov
- 1980 – It's All Over – Friend
- 1981 – Uncle's Dream – Prince
- 1981 – Ivanov – Shabelsky
