= Stowaway (1978 film) =

- Russian: Безбилетная пассажирка
- Directed by: Yuri Pobedonostsev
- Written by: Vladimir Sukhorebry
- Starring: Tatyana Dogileva; Konstantin Kravinsky; Amurbek Gobashiyev; Tigran Davydov; Olga Torban
- Cinematography: Boris Seredin
- Music by: Larisa Kritskaya
- Release date: 1978
- Country: Soviet Union
- Language: Russian

Stowaway (Russian: Безбилетная пассажирка, romanized: Bezbiletnaya passazhirka, lit. 'ticketless female passenger') is a 1978 Soviet comedy film directed by Yuri Pobedonostsev.

== Plot ==
Ninka meets Anton, with whom she goes to the BAM construction site, but forgets to buy a ticket.

== Cast ==
- Tatyana Dogileva as Ninka
- Konstantin Kravinsky as Anton
- Amurbek Gobashiyev
- Tigran Davydov
- Olga Torban
- Natalya Khorokhorina
- Marina Shigaryova
- Mikhail Bychkov
- Yuriy Chigrov
- Vyacheslav Gostinsky
