= Playboy (disambiguation) =

Playboy is a men's magazine.

Playboy may also refer to:

== Entities associated with Playboy Enterprises ==
- Playboy Enterprises, the previous name of PLBY Group, the publisher of Playboy Magazine
- Playboy Foundation, a non-profit charity
- Playboy Mansion, the home of Playboy Enterprises head Hugh Hefner
- Playboy Club, a chain of nightclubs run by Playboy Enterprises
  - Playboy Bunny, a waitress at a Playboy Club
  - Playboy Club (Las Vegas)
- Playboy Playmate, the featured model in an issue of Playboy magazine
- Playboy Jazz Festival, the original name of the Hollywood Bowl Jazz Festival

=== Media ===
- Playboy Special Edition, a spin-off of Playboy magazine
- Playboy (Brazil), the Brazilian edition of Playboy magazine
- Monthly Playboy, the Japanese edition of Playboy magazine
- Australian Playboy
- Playboy TV, cable channel formerly known as The Playboy Channel
- Playboy One, a satellite television channel in the United Kingdom
- Playboy Online
- Playboy Press, their imprint for book publishing
- Playboy Radio
- Playboy Records, a record label
- Playboy: The Mansion, a 2005 video game

== Music ==
=== Artists ===
- Bob Wills and The Texas Playboys - Western Swing band

=== Albums ===
- Playboy (The Marvelettes album)
- Bad Girl (La Toya Jackson album) or Playboy, an album and song by La Toya Jackson
- Playboys (The Rasmus album)
- Playboys (Chet Baker & Art Pepper album), 1956
- Playboy (Fireboy DML album), 2022

=== Songs ===
- "Playboy" (The Marvelettes song), 1962
- "Playboy" (Ann Christine song), 1966
- "Playboy" (Gene & Debbe song), 1967
- "Playboy" (Trey Songz song), 2017
- "Playboys" (song), a 2009 song by the Rasmus
- "Playboy", a 2009 song by Candy Coated Killahz
- "Playboy", a 2004 song by Lloyd Banks from his album The Hunger for More
- "Playboy", a 2004 song by Hot Chip from their album Coming on Strong
- "Playboy", a 2015 song by Exo from their album Exodus
- "Playboy", a 2022 song by twlv

== Transportation ==
- Playboy Automobile Company, an automobile company (1947–51)
- Stits Playboy, a single seat homebuilt airplane
- Kinner Playboy, two-seat airplane

== Media ==
- The Playboy Club, a 2011 American crime drama television series
- The Playboy, a graphic novel
- The Playboys, 1992 film starring Robin Wright
- Playboy: A Portfolio of Art and Satire, periodical published by Egmont Arens 1919-1924
- Weekly Playboy, a Japanese magazine not affiliated with Playboy Enterprises

== Other ==
- Jeremy Klein, nicknamed Playboy, American professional skateboarder
- Playboy lifestyle
- Playboys gang, a street gang in Southern California and various other states
- Play-Boy (pinball), a pinball machine

== See also ==
- Playmen, a defunct Italian adult entertainment magazine modeled on the American Playboy
- Lycaenidae, a butterfly family, several of whose species' common names include "playboy"
- Playboi Carti (born 1995 or 1996), American rapper
- Vilaiyattu Pillai (lit. 'Playboy'), a 1970 Indian film
- Playgirl (disambiguation)
- Playmates (disambiguation)
