= The Flood (1993 film) =

1993 film

- Film poster
- Directed by: Igor Minaiev
- Written by: Igor Minaiev; Jacques Baynac; Bernard Stora
- Produced by: Jérôme Paillard; Daniel Toscan du Plantier
- Starring: Isabelle Huppert
- Cinematography: Vladimir Pankov
- Release date: 1993
- Running time: 99 minutes
- Countries: France; Russia
- Language: Russian

The Flood (French: L'Inondation) is a 1993 French-Russian crime film directed by Igor Minaiev and starring Isabelle Huppert. It is based on the 1929 short story Navodneniye by Yevgeny Zamyatin. It was screened at the Locarno Festival in 1994.

== Plot ==
The film takes place in Petrograd in the 1920s. Sofia (Isabelle Huppert) dreams of becoming a mother, hoping that with the birth of a child, husband Trofim (Boris Nevzorov) will not leave her. However, the woman can not conceive for a long time. One day a young neighbor, Ganka, who was left an orphan, appears in the couple's home. She begins to cohabit with Trofim, and his interest for his wife is completely lost. Taking advantage of a flood which came to pass, Sofia gets rid of her rival. Everyone believes that Ganka ran away from home. Meanwhile, Sofia is pregnant, and the relations of the spouses are improving. After giving birth to her daughter and during a fever, she tells how she killed Ganka with an ax.

== Cast ==
- Isabelle Huppert - Sofia
- Boris Nevzorov - Trofim
- Svetlana Kryuchkova - Pelagiya
- Mariya Lipkina - Ganka (as Masha Lipkina)
- Vladimir Kuznetsov
- Mikhail Pyam
- Andrei Tolubeyev
- Fyodor Valikov
- Natalya Yegorova
- Aleksey Zaytsev
- Robert Mammone - Pilot #1
