= Matters of the Heart (1973 film) =

- Russian: Дела сердечные
- Directed by: Azhdar Ibragimov
- Written by: Vladimir Kunin; Semyon Laskin
- Starring: Antonina Shuranova; Ekaterina Markova; Anatoliy Papanov; Georgiy Taratorkin; Pavel Vinnik
- Cinematography: Margarita Pilikhina
- Music by: Arif Malikov
- Production company: Mosfilm
- Release date: 1973
- Running time: 92 minutes
- Country: Soviet Union
- Language: Russian

Matters of the Heart (Russian: Дела сердечные) is a 1973 Soviet drama film directed by Azhdar Ibragimov.

== Plot ==
The film follows one night in the life of a specialized cardiology ambulance team of a physician, two paramedics, and a driver responds to emergency calls involving cardiovascular conditions, rushing through the streets of nighttime Moscow.

As they move from one call to the next, the team encounters a range of patients and medical emergencies, varying in severity and urgency. Their shift includes routine interventions, unexpected complications, and interactions with patients’ families. Through these situations, the professional and personal dynamics among the crew members are gradually revealed.

== Cast ==
- Antonina Shuranova as Lida (ambulance paramedic)
- Ekaterina Markova as Natasha (ambulance paramedic)
- Anatoliy Papanov as Boris Ivanovich (ambulance driver)
- Georgiy Taratorkin as Yevgeni Pavlovich (ambulance doctor)
- Pavel Vinnik as doctor
- Inna Kondrateva as Sergeeva (patient's wife)
- Georgiy Kulikov as Sergeev (patient with a heart attack)
- Dmitriy Masanov
- Daniil Netrebin
- Lidiya Dranovskaya
