= Prizk (TV series) =

Gold Field (Russian: Прииск) is a Russian drama TV series from Fenix Film which premiered on Fenix-Art in 2006. Its director is Alexei Kozlov. It stars Yaroslav Boyko as a geologist Sergei Romanov.

The series tells the story of a tiny Siberian gold field settlement and its dwellers involved in the turbulent events.

The first season of the series had gained positive reviews consequently the second season (The Gold Field: Gold Rush) was filmed and aired in 2007.

== Cast ==
- Alexey Zubkov as Gennady Tomilin
- Yaroslav Boyko as Sergey Romanov, a geologist
- Nikolai Dobrynin as Kolya Dvoryanin
- Leonid Kulagin as Sluzhaev
- Kira Kreylis-Petrova as Geltuciha
