= Once Lied =

- Russian: Единожды солгав…
- Directed by: Vladimir Bortko
- Written by: Vladimir Bortko; Arkadiy Inin
- Starring: Yury Belyayev; Elena Solovey; Irina Skobtseva; Yuri Zvyagintsev; Sergey Yakovlev
- Cinematography: Anatoly Lapshov
- Edited by: Leda Semyonova
- Music by: Vladimir Dashkevich
- Production company: Lenfilm
- Release date: 1987
- Running time: 96 min.
- Country: Soviet Union
- Language: Russian

Once Lied (Russian: Единожды солгав…, romanized: Edinozhdy solgav...) is a 1987 Soviet romantic drama film directed by Vladimir Bortko.

== Plot ==
The film tells about the complex emotional experiences of the Soviet conformist artist Alexander Kryukov. He was once a participant in the banned Bulldozer Exhibition, and after its defeat he finally “reforged”, becoming an official socialist realist, painting ceremonial portraits of production leaders commissioned by the authorities. The advent of Perestroika awakened his former oppositional thoughts. At the same time, stagnation in creativity, caused by nihilism, laziness of spirit and the patronage of his boss, leads Kryukov to a “midlife crisis.” Bitter sobering by reality ultimately leads him to repentance and reassessment of life.

== Cast ==
- Yury Belyayev as Aleksandr Grigoryevich Kryukov
- Elena Solovey as Irina
- Irina Skobtseva as Anna Ivanovna
- Yuri Zvyagintsev as Yura
- Sergey Yakovlev as Ivan Semyonovich
- Irina Rozanova as Tanya
- Yevgeny Vesnik as Aleksandr's father
- Yuriy Kuznetsov as Stanislav Lapshin
- Natalya Sayko as Emma Andreyevna
- Nikolai Grinko as Stanislav Sergeyevich Sheshko
- Andrei Tolubeyev as Nikolai
- Aleksey Buldakov as Sergei
