= Nikolay Skorobogatov =

Soviet actor

Nikolay Arkadevich Skorobogatov (Russian: Никола́й Арка́дьевич Скоробога́тов; December 19, 1923 — June 10, 1987) was a Soviet film and theater actor.

== Biography ==
Born in the family of the railway. After graduating from high school, he was admitted to the secondary structure of an actor Viazemsky Drama Theater, where he worked until July 1941. Also in July 1941, the family traveled to Skorobogatov city of Stalingrad, where Nicholay became Stalingrad Spectators actor, while working as a storekeeper at a military warehouse.

In March 1942, he went to the front, where he fought as an arrow Airborne Regiment.

Demobilized in 1945, right in the military uniform came to enter the acting department Mikhail Shchepkin Higher Theatre School.

After graduation in 1949 he was accepted into the troupe of Moscow Satire Theatre, where he played until 1952.

In October 1952 he was sent to Germany to work in the Second Drama Theater Group of Soviet Forces. After returning from Germany in October 1956, one year was in the company of film actor Theatre-studio.

In July 1957, he was accepted into the Moscow theater comedy tour, which worked for ten years.

In October 1967, invited to the Lenkom Theatre, where he served until his death.

In the last years of his life Nikolai Skorobogatov developed kidney disease, which was the cause of death of the actor.

He was buried in Moscow at the Vagankovo Cemetery (station number 2).

== Awards ==
- Honored Artist of the RSFSR (1977).
- Order of the Patriotic War second degree (1985).
- Vasilyev Brothers State Prize of the RSFSR (1985).

== Selected filmography ==
- 1951 — Sport Honor as listener
- 1967 — Blasted Hell as Lifanov
- 1968 — The Secret Agent's Blunder as judge
- 1969 — Village Detective as Ivan Ivanovich
- 1973 — Investigation Held by ZnaToKi as Ivan Demin
- 1976 — The Twelve Chairs as Tikhon, janitor
- 1979 — Siberiade as Ermolai
- 1982 — Stopped Train as Pavel Sergeyevich Golovanov, head of Custody
- 1983 — Vassa as Brother
- 1983 — Yeralash as labor teacher
- 1984 — TASS Is Authorized to Declare... as Arkhipkin
- 1984 — Formula of Love as Stepan
