= Private Life (1982 film) =

- Directed by: Yuli Raizman
- Written by: Anatoli Grebnev; Yuli Raizman
- Starring: Mikhail Ulyanov; Iya Savvina; Irina Gubanova; Tatyana Dogileva
- Cinematography: Emil Gulidov; Valentin Piganov
- Edited by: Valeriya Belova
- Music by: Vyacheslav Ganelin
- Production company: Mosfilm
- Release date: 1982
- Running time: 102 minutes
- Country: Soviet Union
- Language: Russian

Private Life (Russian: Частная жизнь, translit. Chastnaya zhizn) is a 1982 Soviet drama film directed by Yuli Raizman. It was nominated for the Academy Award for Best Foreign Language Film in 1982.

== Plot ==
After two manufacturing plants are merged into one, Sergey Nikitich Abrikosov (played by Mikhail Ulyanov), the former director of one of the plants, is compelled to retire. A classic Stalin-era manager, Abrikosov embodies a life wholly devoted to work, where his role and responsibilities have always provided his sense of purpose. Known for his demanding and unyielding leadership, he still operates with the same vigor that drove him as a young man, when he was promoted to director and awarded his first medal at age 20. However, now retired, Abrikosov struggles to find his footing outside of work, facing an unfamiliar void in his personal life. His relationship with his family proves challenging; his son, unlike him, lacks ambition and prefers leisure to study. His wife (played by Iya Savvina) respects him but shares little common ground, and even his daughter from a previous marriage has unresolved family issues of her own.

Gradually, shared experiences bring Abrikosov closer to his family, but his sense of identity remains deeply unsettled. When informed of his successor—a candidate he considers unworthy—Abrikosov heads to the ministry, where he learns of plans for a potential new role. The film ends ambiguously, with Abrikosov receiving a call to return to the ministry. As he stands before a mirror adjusting his tie, his movements slow, lost in deep reflection. Film critic Neya Zorkaya suggests this final moment hints at Abrikosov’s realization that he may have spent his life on pursuits he now finds empty and unfulfilling. Mikhail Ulyanov, the actor portraying Abrikosov, saw it differently, imagining that, whatever the outcome, this experience has profoundly reshaped Abrikosov’s inner world, transforming him into a different person.

== Cast ==
- Mikhail Ulyanov as Sergei Nikitich Abrikosov
- Iya Savvina as Natalia Ilinichna
- Irina Gubanova as Nelli Petrovna
- Tatyana Dogileva as Vika
- Aleksei Blokhin as Igor
- Elena Sanayeva as Marina
- Liliya Gritsenko as Marya Andreevna
- Yevgeni Lazarev as Viktor Sergeyevich Petelin

== See also ==
- List of submissions to the 55th Academy Awards for Best Foreign Language Film
- List of Soviet submissions for the Academy Award for Best Foreign Language Film
