= Forgive Me (film) =

- Russian: Прости
- Directed by: Ernest Yasan
- Written by: Viktor Merezhko
- Starring: Natalya Andreychenko; Igor Kostolevsky; Viktor Merezhko; Aleksandra Yakovleva; Alisa Freyndlikh
- Cinematography: Ivan Bagaev
- Edited by: Galina Tanayeva
- Music by: Vadim Bibergan
- Production company: Lenfilm
- Release date: 1 November 1986
- Running time: 79 min.
- Country: Soviet Union
- Language: Russian

Forgive Me (Russian: Прости, romanized: Prosti) is a 1986 Soviet romantic drama film directed by Ernest Yasan.

== Plot ==
Pre-holiday day on the eve of November 7th. The working day at the Influenza Institute, where the main character Masha, an outwardly happy wife and mother, works as a laboratory assistant, is in full swing. While the rest of the employees are working, Masha is on the phone. Suddenly, a mysterious call comes from a woman who reports that Masha’s husband Kirill is cheating on her. The woman invites Masha to come at the appointed time and place and personally verify her husband’s infidelity. After Masha saw her husband getting into a taxi in an embrace with a young woman, her ideas about reality collapse.

During the rest of the day, Masha goes through a cycle of severe disappointments, insults and tragedies, including a quarrel with colleagues, taking out pain and resentment on her innocent teenage daughter, whom Masha beats in response to a simple question, the loss of a close friend who kicks Masha out of the house, suspecting an attempt to seduce her friend, disappointment in a former classmate (the old Love Machine), a conversation with a rival who takes the incident lightly and does not even pretend that Kirill should get a divorce, an attempt to start a relationship with a casual acquaintance, to whom she comes and finds his wife at home, and, finally, gang rape by a teenage group late at night; in dirty clothes, beaten and devastated, Masha returns home early in the morning. My husband is at home, my daughter is at home, they are awake and waiting for Masha. The final silent scene gives hope for the reconciliation of the spouses, because they come to the realization that family is the only thing that still has any meaning for them.

== Cast ==
- Natalya Andreychenko as Masha
- Igor Kostolevsky as Kirill
- Viktor Merezhko as Vladimir
- Aleksandra Yakovleva as Natasha
- Alisa Freyndlikh as Elizaveta Andreevna
- Vladimir Menshov as Sergei
- Aleksei Zharkov as Sasha
- Lyudmila Arinina as Olga Petrovna
- Olga Volkova as Lydia Mikhailovna Svirskaya
- Aleksandr Kuznetsov as Andrei
