= Strange Adults =

- Written by: Arkady Minchkovsky; Maria Zvereva
- Directed by: Ayan Shahmaliyeva
- Starring: Margarita Sergeyecheva; Lev Durov; Irina Kirichenko
- Music by: Veniamin Basner
- Country of origin: Soviet Union
- Original language: Russian

Production
- Producer: Viktor Borodin
- Cinematography: Yuri Veksler
- Editor: Zinaida Sheineman
- Running time: 78 minutes
- Production company: Lenfilm

Original release
- Release: 1974

Strange Adults (Russian: Странные взрослые, romanized: Strannye vzroslye) is a Soviet lyrical television film of 1974, which tells of the complexity of the relationship between adults and children. The plot is based on the same story by Arkady Minchkovsky. It is considered to be one of the best films in the film career of Lev Durov and Margarita Sergeyecheva.

== Plot ==
The elderly childless spouses adopt the orphanage girl Tonya. Tidy's childish frankness, a lack of understanding that things may not be common, but someone's, her trustful contact and excessive independence prevent her from finding a rapport with her new-found parents.

== Cast ==
- Margarita Sergeyecheva as Tonya
- Lev Durov as Pyotr Vasilievich Ryabikov
- Irina Kirichenko as Anna Ryabikova, Pyotr Vasilievich's wife
- Yevgeniya Khanayeva as Augusta Yakovlevna
- Zinovy Gerdt as Oleg Kuks
- Alexander Demyanenko as Yevgeny Nalivaiko
- Antonina Shuranova as Nina Ivanovna
- Yuri Kamorny as Yura

== Shooting Group ==
- Director: Ayan Shahmaliyeva
- Writers: Maria Zvereva, Arkady Minchkovsky
- Cinematographer: Yuri Veksler
- Composer: Veniamin Basner
- Artists: Marksen Gaukhman-Sverdlov, Rimma Narinyan

== Awards ==
- Prize Union of Cinematographers of the USSR (1975)
- Grand Prix XII MKTF Zlatá Praha (1975)

== Criticism ==
Rita Sergeyecheva and talented tragic actor Lev Durov are so human, courageous and at the same time so defenseless that you watch the film - and all the while trampling in the nose treacherously. Particularly light final scene.

The film is not afraid of reproaches in sentimentality, moreover, it has its direct aim to provoke in us, the spectators, the simplest and warmest emotions and frank desire that everything ends wellю Rita Sergeycheva played Tonya. She played her harsh and childish straightforwardness and organic categorical, collectivism, her absolute misunderstanding that things may not be common, but someone's, her trustful contact and some kind of bitterly bitter independence of the child. In general, this film is overly talked, and its plot for the television is too tightly knit. There would be more pauses, accidents that do not serve this very plot, more than that artistically necessary non-essentiality in the frame to which the best works of the television movie.
