= Tatyana Dogileva =

Soviet and Russian actress

- Татьяна Догилева
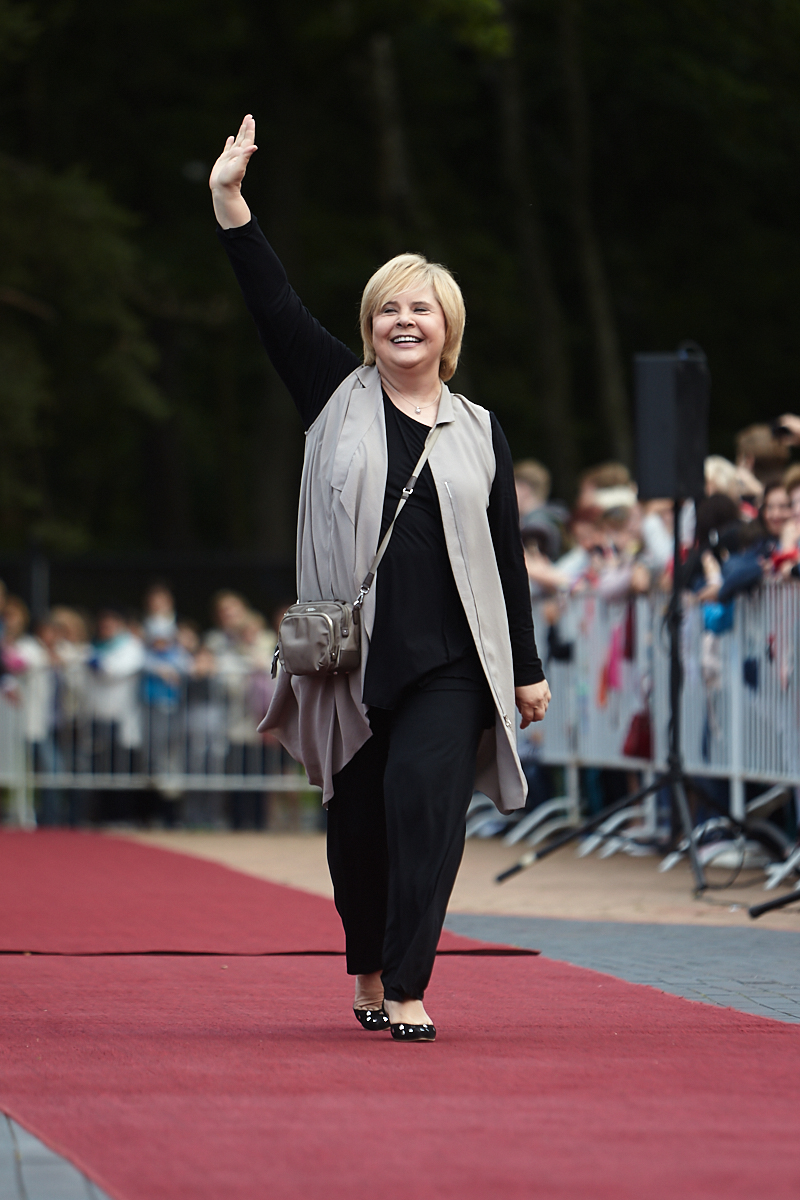
- Dogileva in 2017
- Born: Tatyana Anatoliyevna Dogileva; 27 February 1957 (age 69); Moscow, RSFSR, USSR
- Citizenship: Soviet Union; Russia
- Occupation: Actress
- Years active: 1971–present

Tatyana Anatoliyevna Dogileva (Russian: Татья́на Анато́льевна До́гилева; born 27 February 1957) is a Soviet and Russian film and stage actress, Meritorious Artist of Russia (1989), and People's Artist of Russia (2000).

== Biography ==
=== Early life and education ===
Dogileva was born on February 27, 1957, in Moscow, into a working-class family. She received her secondary education at the Academy of Pedagogical Sciences in Moscow, where she combined her studies with rhythmic gymnastics and choreography. At age 14, she entered the Young Actor's Studio at the Central Television.

In 1978, Dogileva graduated from the Lunacharsky State Institute of Theatrical Art, where she studied under Vsevolod Ostalsky.

=== Theatre ===
Dogileva's stage career began with a successful performance in her thesis play Much Ado About Nothing, where she played Beatrice.

She was then invited to three theaters in Moscow, and she chose Lenin Komsomol Theater, where she worked until 1985. Among her best-known Lenkom parts was that of Nelly in Cruel Games, staged by Mark Zakharov, which was an important theatrical event at the time.

Having transferred in 1985 to the Yermolova Theatre, Dogileva participated in the productions of director Valery Fokin's Sports Games, Speak, Shaky Balance, and Our Decameron., a play by Roman Viktyuk.

In the eight-hour play by Peter Stein "Oresteia" Aeschylus (1994), staged at the base of the Russian Army Theatre, Dogileva played Electra. According to critics, her performance was the main event of that Russian theatrical season. With the same performance on an international tour, she earned recognition from audiences in France, Germany, Greece, Great Britain and the Netherlands.

Among the theatrical works of Tatyana Dogileva in the 1990s were Twelfth Night at the Mossovet Theatre and "The Incredible Session", along Mikhail Kozakov. She subsequently performed in the plays Honoring, at the Anton Chekov Theatre, and The Ideal Husband, staged in 2004 at the Theater-Studio under the direction of Oleg Tabakov.

=== Film ===
Dogileva started her film career while still a student, cast in episodic parts. Her first major role was of Nina in The Stowaway Passenger (1978). In the following years, she starred in the films Vasily and Vasilisa (1981), Private Life (1982), The Pokrovsky Gate (1982), Station for Two (1982), The Unexpected (1983), and many others.

The role of saleswoman Vera in The Blonde Around the Corner (1984) directed by Vladimir Bortko was especially noteworthy; along with Andrei Mironov, the actress created a new type of character for the screen - charming in a feminine way, yet firmly independent from the "omnipotent" Soviet service sector.

The actress received more recognition among audiences with the role of nurse Lida in the picture Forgotten Melody for a Flute (1987), directed by Eldar Ryazanov. Dogileva played the heroine of her time, sternly confronting life difficulties while saving her lover from moral death. The same theme recurred in her role of Marina from Afghan Breakdown (1993), directed by Vladimir Bortko.

Among the films in her later years, there were The Bridegroom from Miami (1994), Hello, Fools! (1996), East/West (1999) as well as the TV series Plot (2003), Lyuba, Children and the Plant (2005-2006 sitcom), Hobo (2007, 2009) and Mine (2009).

In 2005–2007, Tatyana Dogileva hosted the psychological talk show Two Truths on NTV.

=== Directing ===
In 1998, Tatyana Dogileva made her debut as stage director in Mikhail Kozakov's theatrical company; she staged the romantic comedy "Moonlight, a Honeymoon" based on the play Private Lives by English playwright Noël Coward. It was translated by her husband Mikhail Mishin. Despite the initially poor critical reception, the play went on being performed for 20 years.

Then there were The Ones In Love do not Renounce... (2000); Moscow Passions based on Alexander Ostrovsky's play It's Not All Shrovetide for the Cat at the Mikhail Kozakov Theater, and the comedy The Lady Waits, the Clarinet Plays (2004), with the creative association "Duet". In 2011, her play Fallen Angels premiered at the Central House of Musicians.

Dogileva herself acted in almost all the plays she directed. Her directorial debut was the film Lera (2007).

=== Literature ===
In addition to her work in theater, cinema and television, the actress has been also active in the literary field. Her first novel, The Life and Adventures of Sveta Khokhryakova, published in 2010, tackles modern Russian realities - the poverty-stricken life in the remote places of the country; the luxury and moral degradation of the rich living in the capital city, and the venality of people working in television.

== Honors and awards ==
- People's Artist of the Russian Federation
- Honored Artist of the RSFSR
- Kinotavr award for Best Actress in Afghan Breakdown

== Personal life ==
Tatyana Dogileva was married twice. The actress has a daughter, Ekaterina, from her marriage to playwright Mikhail Mishin.

== Activism ==
Tatiana Dogileva participated in several protest campaigns against destruction of nature and for preservation of Russia's architectural heritage.

In 2010, Dogileva publicly criticized fellow cinematographer Nikita Mikhalkov for destroying several historical buildings in downtown Moscow to build his own hotel there. She was arrested for picketing the construction site.

== Selected filmography ==
Dogileva's film debut was in 1971; since then she has appeared in more than 80 Soviet and Russian films.

- Mnogoetazhka (Многоэтажка, 2022) as Tamara Genrikhovna
- The Vampires of Midland (Вампиры средней полосы, 2021) as Irina Vitalyevna Bredikhina
- Yolki 3 (Ёлки 3, 2013) as Marta Petrovna
- Dead Man's Bluff (Жмурки, 2005) as Galya
- The Fall of the Empire (Гибель империи, 2005, TV) as hostess of the apartment, Zina's mother
- My Fair Nanny (Моя прекрасная няня, 2004) as Natalia Kanareichenko
- East/West (Восток-Запад, 1999) as Olga
- Hello, Fools! (Привет, дуралеи!, 1996) as Svetlana Kablukova
- Afghan Breakdown (Афганский излом, 1990) as Katya
- Forgotten Melody for a Flute (Забытая мелодия для флейты, 1987) as Lida
- Do Not Marry, Girls (Не ходите, девки, замуж, 1985) as Valya
- The Pokrovsky Gate (Покровские ворота, 1984) as Svetlana Popova
- The Blonde Around the Corner (Блондинка за углом, 1984) as Nadezhda
- Private Life (Частная жизнь, 1982) as Vika
- Station for Two (Вокзал для двоих, 1982) as Marina
- Late Meeting (Поздняя встреча, 1979) as daughter
- Stowaway (Безбилетная пассажирка, 1977) as Ninka
