= Skydivers (film) =

- Russian: Парашютисты
- Directed by: Yuri Ivanchuk
- Written by: Eduard Shim
- Starring: Aleksandra Yakovleva; Boris Nevzorov; Yelena Yelanskaya; Vladlen Biryukov; Stepan Starchikov
- Cinematography: Nikolai Puchkov
- Edited by: Vera Biryukova; Lidiya Zhuchkova
- Music by: Georgiy Nikolaenko
- Production company: Gorky Film Studio
- Release date: 1984
- Running time: 87 minutes
- Country: Soviet Union
- Language: Russian

Skydivers (Russian: Парашютисты) is a 1984 Soviet drama film directed by Yuri Georgievich Ivanchuk.

== Plot ==
Girl Zina met with aerial filmmaker Sergei Aleikin, as a result of which she became interested in parachuting and decided to take part in international competitions, in which she became a contender for a gold medal. And suddenly a tragedy occurred: the helicopter in which Sergey was in fell into the gorge, and this forces Zina to leave the sport.

== Cast ==
- Aleksandra Yakovleva as Zinaida Gostilova
- Boris Nevzorov as Sergey Aleikin
- Yelena Yelanskaya as Olga Filatova
- Vladlen Biryukov as Nikolay Lykov
- Stepan Starchikov as Aleksey Volchik
- Valeri Ryzhakov as Matvey Gostilov
- Vadim Zakharchenko as Vladimir Mikeshin
- Ivars Kalnins
- Elena Astafeva as Masha Zaikina
- Natalya Kaznacheeva as Galina Nechaeva
