= Bryantsev Youth Theatre =

Russian cultural institution

Coordinates: 59°55′12″N 30°20′04″E

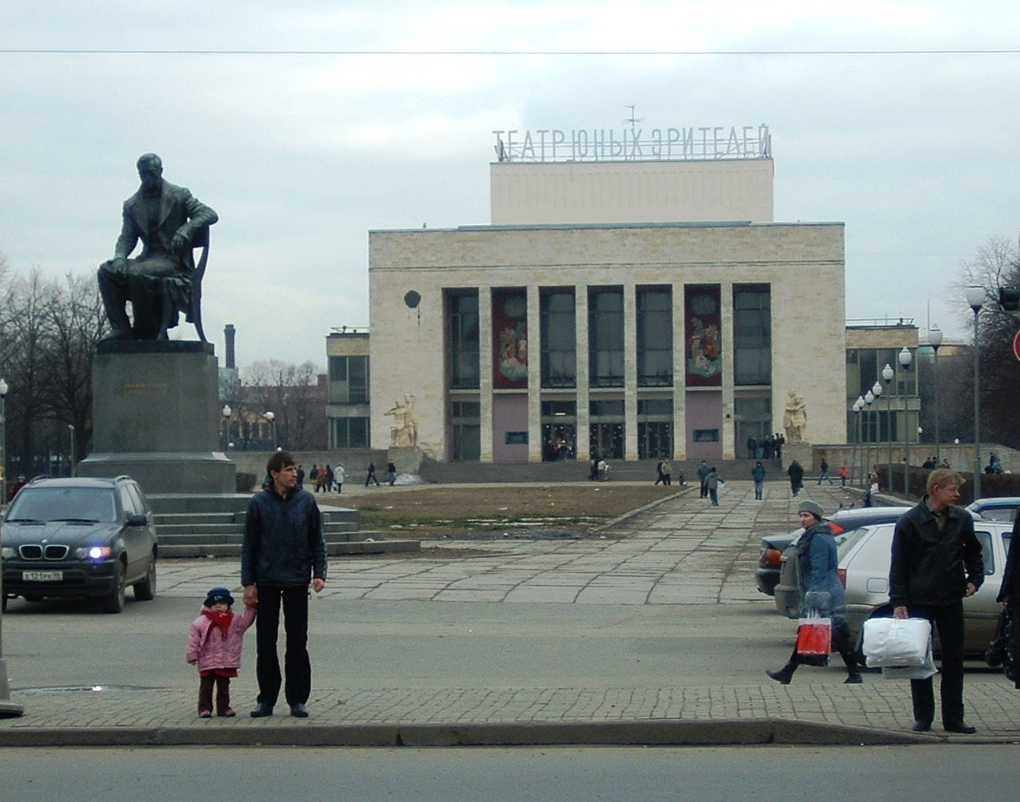
Bryantsev Youth Theatre

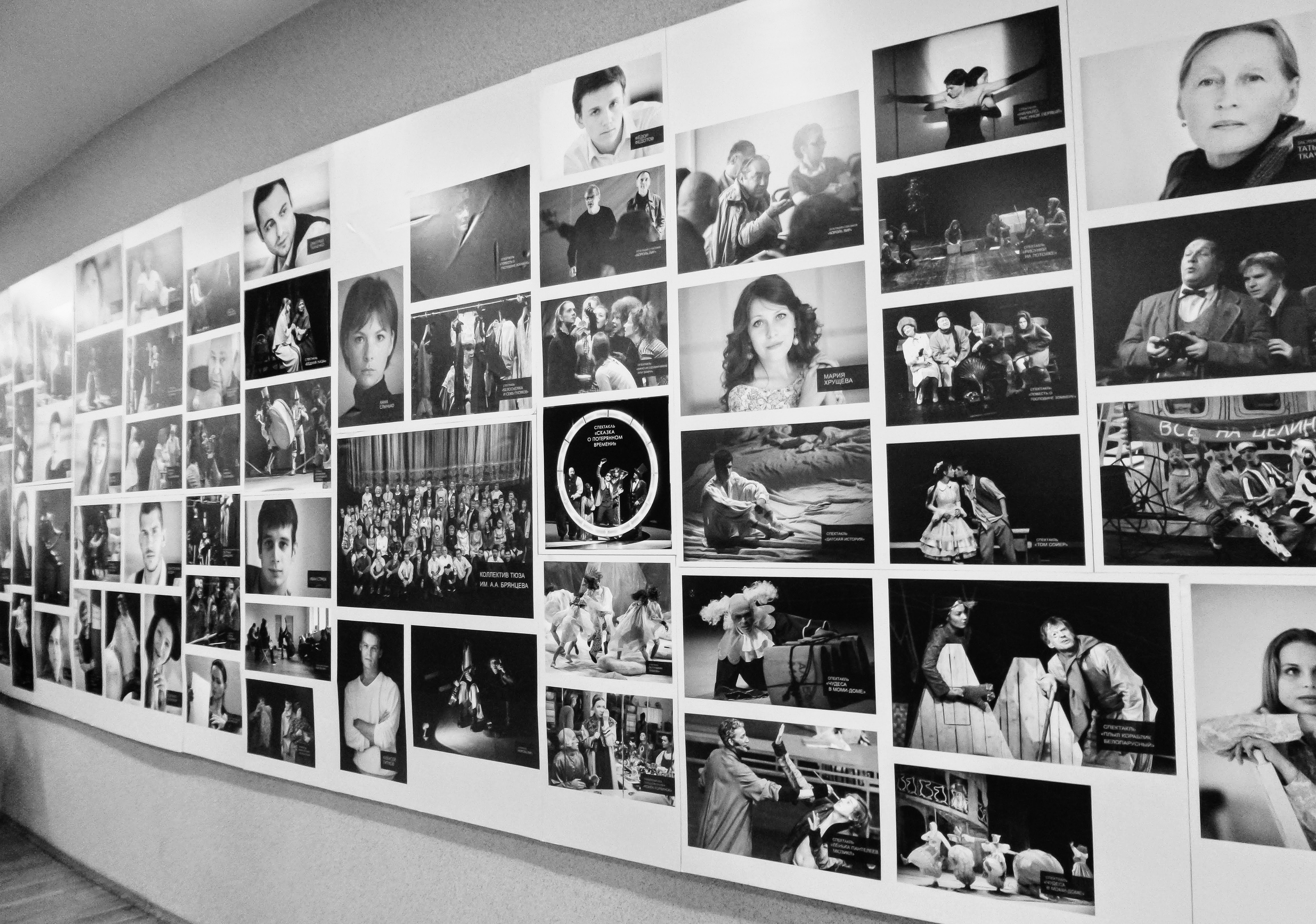
Wall in the lobby of the theater with photos of actors, 2019

The A. Bryantsev Youth Theatre (also spelled State Theater For Young Audience Named After A. A. Bryantsev or Bryantsev Young Viewers Theater; Russian: Театр Юного Зрителя имени Брянцева) is one of the first professional children's theatres in Russia, opened in 1922. In Soviet time the theatre was called Leningrad Young People's Theatre (Russian: Ленинградский театр юных зрителей, ЛенТЮЗ). In 1962 it was moved to the current newly constructed building. The theatre is in Saint Petersburg, on the Pionerskaya Square near the end of Gorokhovaya Street.

The theatre has been the start of many well-known actors, and is well known for playing fairy tales.

The Theatre is named after its founder Aleksandr Bryantsev (1883-1961). He was the leader of the theatre in 1921-1961 and directed more than fifty plays there. In 1962-1986 the leader of the theater was Zinovy Korogodsky. He directed more than one hundred plays and left a whole school of actors in the theatre . In 1986-1996 the artistic director of the theater was Andrey Andreyev. In 1996-1998 the artistic director was Anatoly Praudin succeeded by Sergey Kargin (1999-2002). In 2002-2007 Theater's Artistic Director was Grigory Kozlov.
