= Yuri Georgievich Ivanchuk =

Soviet film director (1931–2000)

- Born: June 1, 1931; Kuzovatovo, Ulyanovsk Oblast, RSFSR, USSR
- Died: May 18, 2000 (aged 68); Krnov, Czech Republic
- Occupation: film director
- Years active: 1978-1990

Yuri Georgievich Ivanchuk (June 1, 1931, Kuzovatovo (urban locality), Soviet Union — May 18, 2000, Krnov, Czech Republic) was a Soviet and Russian film director. He received the Dovzhenko Gold Medal in 1983 and won the Vasilyev Brothers State Prize of the RSFSR in 1984.

== Biography ==
Yuri Ivanchuk was born on June 1, 1931 in the village of Kuzovatovo, located in the Ulyanovsk Oblast. He studied in secondary school in Samara. In 1963, he graduated from the Military-Political School of the KGB of the USSR and later the Department of history at Tomsk State University. Ivanchuk also graduated from the Higher Academic Courses for the Improvement of Political Personnel at the Lenin Military-Political Academy.

Ivanchuk worked as an assistant director at the Moldova-Film, Mosfilm, and Odesa Film Studio.

In 1997, he moved to the Czech Republic, where he died three years later.

Ivanchuk was married two times. He had a daughter from his first wife.

== Filmography ==
- 1978 — Fire in the Depth of the Tree (Russian: Огонь в глубине дерева) (short film)
- 1981 — Order: Do Not Open Fire (Russian: Приказ: огонь не открывать) (co-directed with Valeri Trofimovich Isakov)
- 1982 — Order: Cross the Border (Russian: Приказ: перейти границу)
- 1984 — Skydivers (Russian: Парашютисты)
- 1986 — 55 Degrees Below Zero (Russian: 55 градусов ниже нуля)
- 1990 — The Inhuman (Russian: Нелюдь)
