= Playboy Club (platform) =

Playboy Club, digital creator platform from Playboy

- Trade name: Playboy Club
- Formerly: Centerfold (2021-2023)
- Industry: Creator economy
- Founded: Dec. 20, 2021
- Website: www.playboyclub.com

Playboy Club (previously Centerfold) is an adult subscription platform that allows creators to upload and sell content to fans through subscriptions. Playboy Club was created in 2021 by American lifestyle brand Playboy Inc.

== History ==
Disruptions to the print industry during the COVID-19 pandemic, led to Playboy pausing production of their print magazine in 2020. As part of a new influencer-led business model, Playboy launched the platform as Centrefold in December 2021 after acquiring content platform Dream.

The platform was relaunched as Playboy Club in March 2023.

Playboy Club offers a subscription-based content platform allowing verified creators to publish and monetize their content.

Playboy Club’s creator community includes celebrities, artists, and adult performers such as:

- Cardi B, who also served as the platform’s Founding Creative Director
- Kaitlyn Siragusa

Mia Khalifa was fired from the platform in October 2023, after pro-Hamas comments on her social media
