= Yevgeniya Khanayeva =

Soviet and Russian actress (1921–1987)

- Евгения Ханаева
- Born: 2 January 1921; Bogorodsk, Russian SFSR, Soviet Union
- Died: 8 November 1987 (aged 66); Moscow, Russian SFSR, Soviet Union
- Resting place: Vvedenskoye Cemetery
- Occupation: Actress
- Years active: 1947–1987
- Spouse: Anatoly Uspensky
- Children: 1
- Awards: People's Artist of the USSR (1987)

Yevgeniya Nikandrovna Khanayeva (Note: Russian: Евгения Никандровна Ханаева, romanized: Yevgeniya Nikandrovna Khanayeva) (2 January 1921 – 8 November 1987) was a Soviet and Russian film and stage actress. People's Artist of the USSR (1987).

== Biography ==
She was born in Bogorodsk to a famous opera singer, Nikandr Khanayev .

== Selected filmography ==
- Monologue (1972)
- Day by Day (1972)
- Strange Adults (1974)
- Practical Joke (1976)
- Moscow Does Not Believe in Tears (1979)
- The Old New Year (1980)
- Simply Awful! (1982)
- Mother Mary (1983)
- Crazy Day of Engineer Barkasov (1983)
- The Blonde Around the Corner (1984)

== Honors and awards ==
- Medal "Veteran of Labour"
- Medal "In Commemoration of the 800th Anniversary of Moscow" (1949)
- Honored Artist of the RSFSR (1963)
- Order of the Badge of Honour (1967)
- People's Artist of the RSFSR (1977)
- People's Artist of the USSR (1987)
