= Let the Charms Last Long =

- Russian: Продлись, продлись, очарованье…
- Directed by: Yaropolk Lapshin
- Written by: Aleksandr Chervinsky; Valeria Peruanskaya
- Starring: Iya Savvina; Oleg Yefremov; Aleftina Yevdokimova; Leonid Kulagin; Marina Yakovleva
- Cinematography: Sergei Gavrilov
- Edited by: Svetlana Tarik
- Music by: Yuriy Levitin
- Production company: Sverdlovsk Film Studio
- Release date: 1984
- Running time: 82 min.
- Country: Soviet Union
- Language: Russian

Let the Charms Last Long (Russian: Продлись, продлись, очарованье…, romanized: Prodlis, prodlis, ocharovaniye...) is a 1984 Soviet drama film directed by Yaropolk Lapshin.

== Plot ==
Anton Skvortsov, a strong and strong-willed person, led a large team all his life, but now he is a pensioner, he buried his wife a year and a half ago, and stayed with his daughter, her husband and adult granddaughter in a large apartment that belongs to him, and recently he also suffered a heart attack.

The attending physician recommended that his daughter send Anton Nikolaevich to the veterans' house. Unable to withstand these conversations, Anton Nikolaevich runs away from home and goes on a tour of Moscow. On a sightseeing bus, he meets Anna Konstantinovna, who has just retired. This meeting turns his whole life upside down.

== Cast ==
- Iya Savvina as Anna Konstantinovna Sharygina
- Oleg Yefremov as Anton Nikolaevich Skvortsov
- Aleftina Yevdokimova as Tatiana, Skvortsov's daughter
- Leonid Kulagin as doctor (voiced by Aleksandr Belyavsky)
- Marina Yakovleva as Lyuba, Skvortsov's granddaughter
- Nina Arkhipova as Elena Georgievna, Skvortsov's neighbor
- Boris Bystrov as Zhenya
- Inna Ulyanova as Faina
- Eduard Martsevich as writer
