= Perm Academic Theatre =

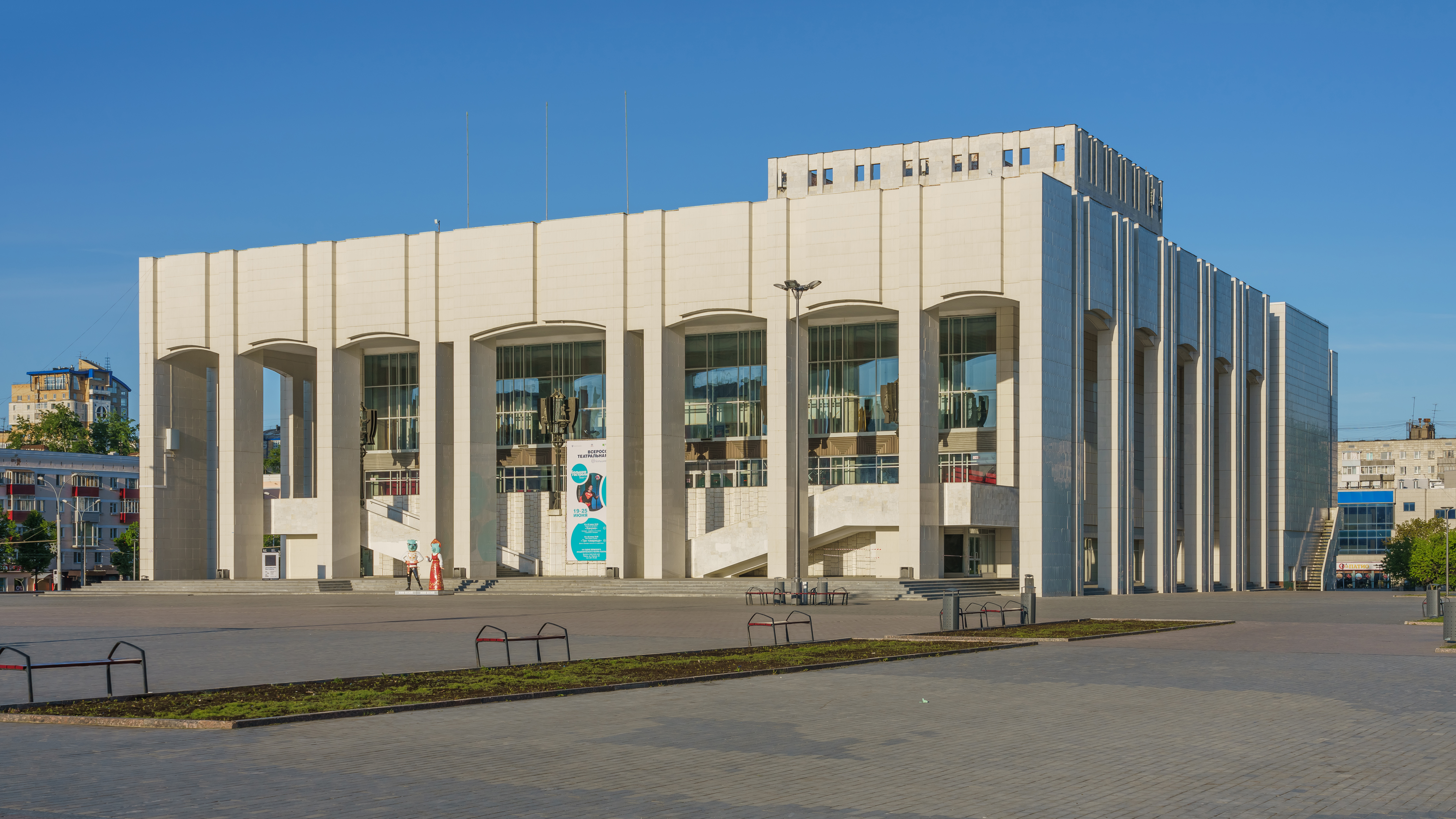
- Interactive map of Perm Academic Theatre
- Address: Perm; Russia
- Coordinates: 58.008007°N 56.216494°E

Construction
- Rebuilt: 1982
- Years active: 1927-present
- Architects: V.P. Davydenko and V.I. Ljutikova

Website
- https://teatr-teatr.com/

The Perm Academic Theatre-Theatre established in Perm as an amateur theater for working youths. Its first performance, the Battleship Potemkin, was held on March, 14th, 1927 on the site of the theater, which at that time had no constant base, but managed to stage 25 new plays a month with their own scenarios, costumes, etc. . The theater's own building for one thousand spectators was built by local architects V.P. Davydenko and V.I. Lyutikova in 1982. The addition of 650 seats is planned.

Serious changes and a turn to professionalism occurred in 1967 and the landmark performance was "Tzar Fedor Ivanovich". Between 1967-2004 the theater was managed by the renowned actor, Ivan Timofeevich Bobylev. In 1990 there were more than 20 plays in the theater's repertoire and the theater was awarded many diplomas ofrom All-Russia, all-Union and international festivals.

Since 2004 the theater has been managed by Boris Milgram. The main director Vladimir Gurfinkel. The current repertoire comprises more than 25 performances.

== Gallery ==
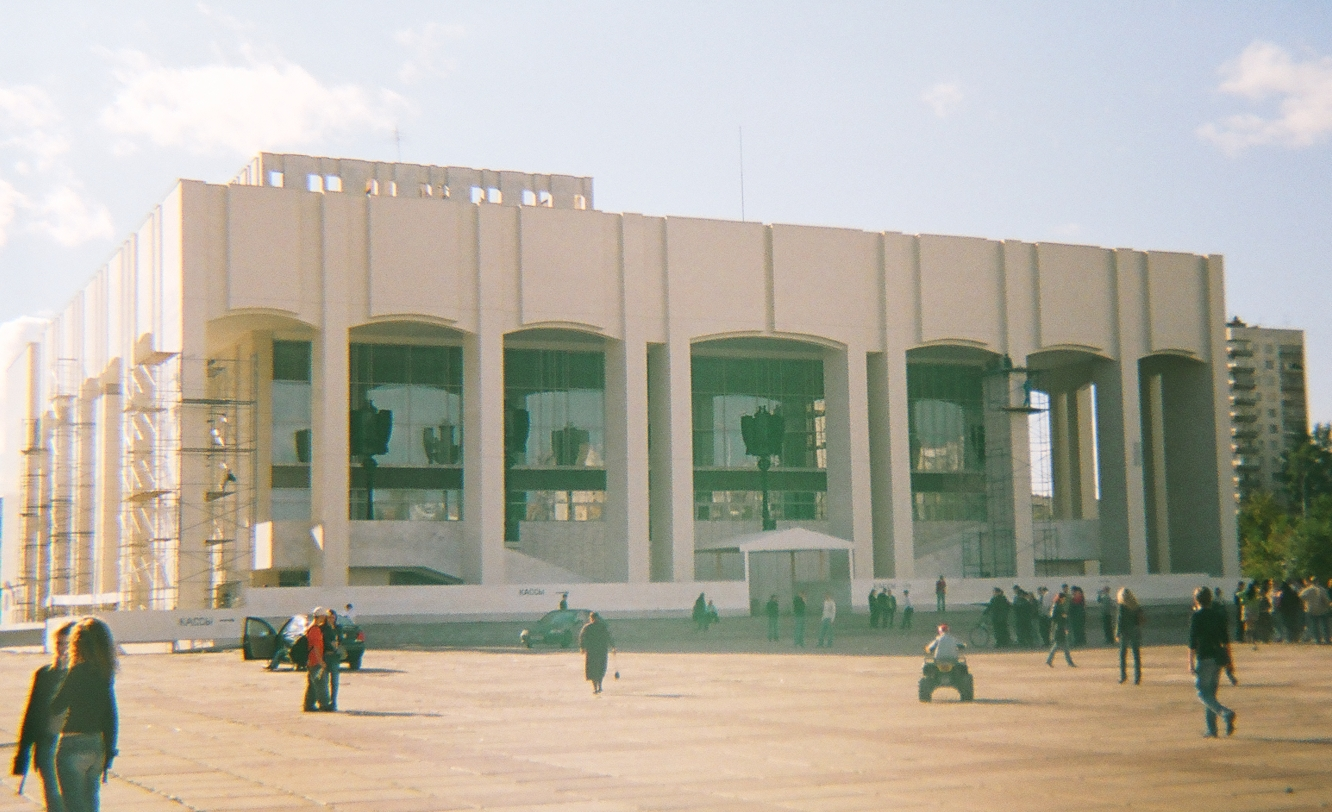
The Perm Academic Theatre

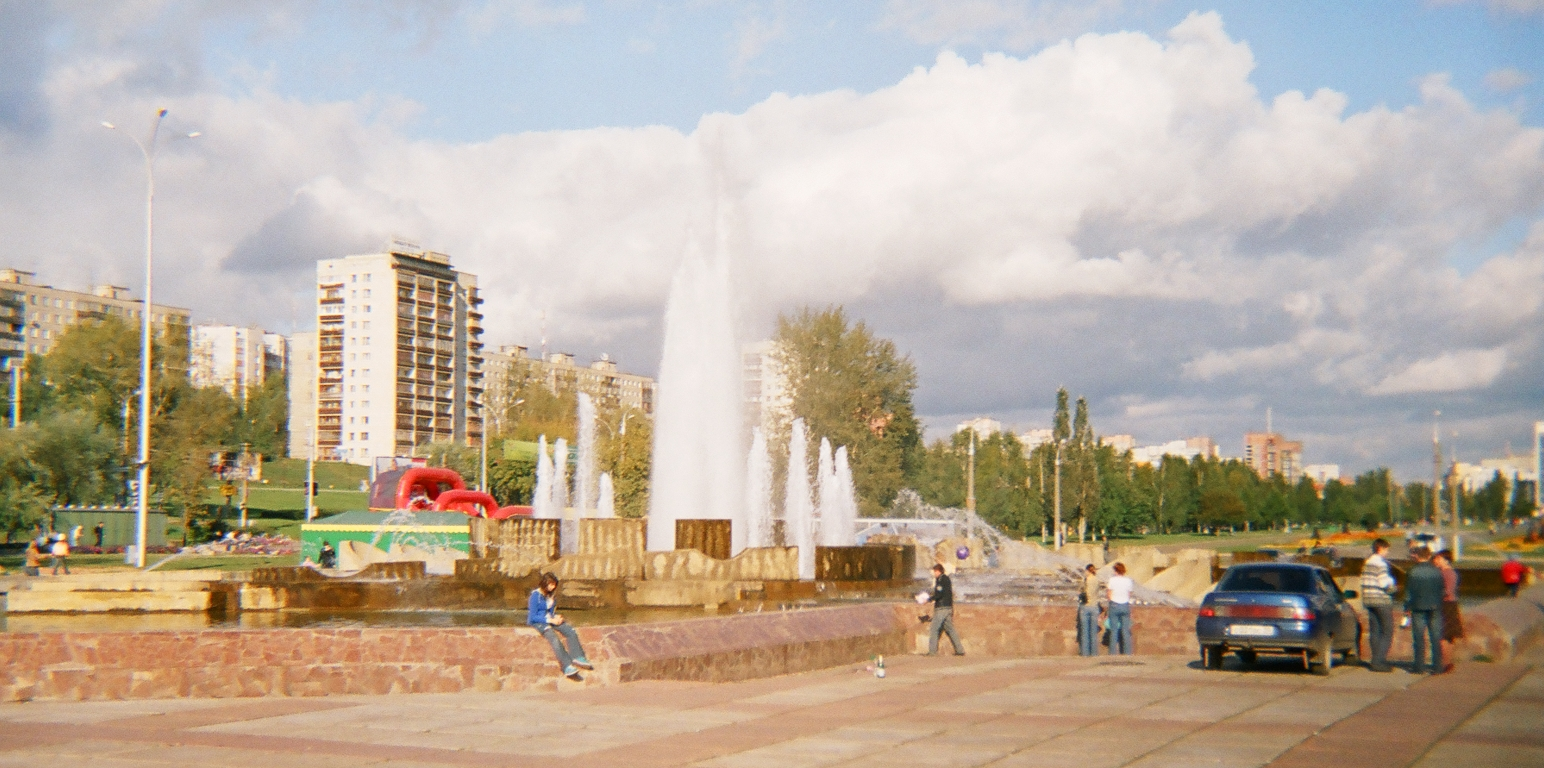
The fountain before the entrance

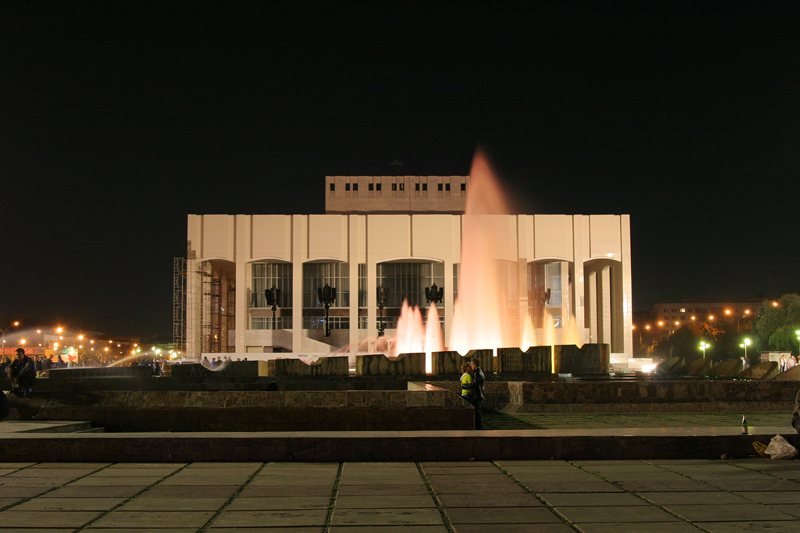
The theater at night

== Literature ==
• Perm from the foundation to the present day. -- Perm: World Book, 2000
