= Aleksandra Yakovleva =

Soviet and Russian actress (1957–2022)

- Александра Яковлева
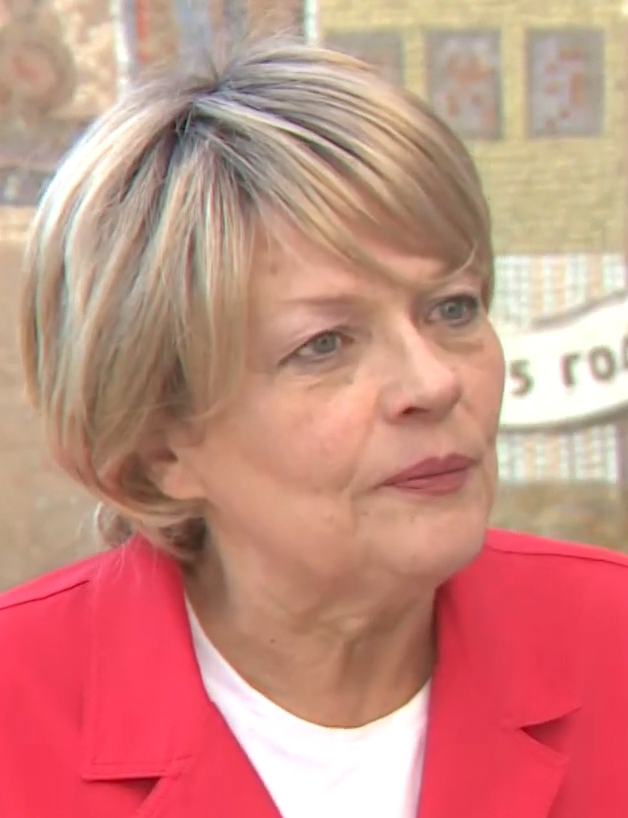
- Born: Aleksandra Evgenievna Ivanes; 2 July 1957; Kaliningrad, Russian SFSR, Soviet Union
- Died: 1 April 2022 (aged 64); Saint Petersburg, Russia
- Education: Russian State Institute of Performing Arts
- Occupations: Actress, public figure, rail transport
- Years active: 1978–2022

Aleksandra Yakovleva (born Aleksandra Evgenievna Ivanes, Russian: Александра Евгеньевна Иванес; 2 July 1957 – 1 April 2022) was a Soviet and Russian actress and, later, a Russian rail transport executive.

== Biography ==
Aleksandra Evgenievna Ivanes was born on 2 July 1957 in Kaliningrad. She derived her stage name Aleksandra Yakovleva from the surname of her maternal grandfather. As a child she was taught dancing; she later studied violin at a music school. In 1978 she graduated from the Leningrad State Institute of Theatre, Music and Cinema. In the Soviet disaster film Air Crew (1979), she performed with Leonid Filatov the first erotic scene in a mainstream domestic Soviet film. During the 1980s, she became one of the most popular actresses of Cinema of the Soviet Union.

In 1993, she left the cinema, Until 1997, she was the chairman of the committee on culture and tourism of the city of Kaliningrad. From 1997, she served as Head of quality management and staff service at Airport Pulkovo and then as deputy chief of management and marketing on the October Railway. She took part in December 2009 launch of the high-speed "Sapsan" trains on the route Moscow — St. Petersburg. At her initiative, a coach with a restaurant and a bar were included in the service. Later, she held the position of Deputy Director General of the Directorate-speed communications of JSC "Russian Railways" (KL net). Having returned to the area on 7 June 2012, she was elected chairman of the Kaliningrad regional branch of the Russian political party "Yabloko".

In April 2016, Yakovleva returned to acting with the St. Petersburg Maly Theatre Comedy in a leading role as "Bernadette", the maid. The remake of Flight Crew was released in 2017, repeating the name and the main theme of the 1979 film. Yakovleva played Tamara again, this time as a big official in the world of aviation.

== Death ==
On 1 April 2022, Yakovleva died at the age of 64 in Saint Petersburg, five years after she had been diagnosed with breast cancer.

== Selected filmography ==
- 1979 Air Crew (Экипаж) as Tamara
- 1982 Charodei (Чародеи) as Alyona
- 1982 Tears Were Falling (Слёзы капали) as Lyusya
- 1984 Skydivers (Парашютисты) as Zinaida Gostilova
- 1985 Start All Over Again (Начни сначала) as Lera
- 1986 Forgive Me (Прости) as Natasha
- 1987 A Man from the Boulevard des Capucines (Человек с бульвара Капуцинов) as Ms. Diana Little
- 1988 Bright Personality (Светлая личность) as Rita Haritullina
- 2016 Flight Crew (Экипаж) as Tamara
- 1985 «Танцплощадка» режиссёра Самсона Самсонова роль Александры
