= Andrei Tolubeyev =

Soviet and Russian actor

- Born: Andrei Yuryevich Tolubeyev; 30 March 1945; Leningrad, RSFSR, Soviet Union
- Died: 7 April 2008 (aged 63); Saint Petersburg, Russia
- Occupation: Actor
- Years active: 1975–2008
- Father: Yuri Tolubeyev

Andrei Yuryevich Tolubeyev (Russian: Андрей Юрьевич Толубеев; March 30, 1945 – April 7, 2008) was a Soviet and Russian stage and film actor and People's Artist of the RSFSR (1991). He was chairman of the board of the Union of Theatrical Figures of Russia (1996). He was born and died of pancreatic cancer in Saint Petersburg.

His father was a famous actor, Yuri Tolubeyev.

== Filmography ==
- Tears Were Falling (1982) – Tolik Bobylyov
- Once Lied (1987) – Nikolai
- To Kill a Dragon (1988) – Hatter
- Adam's Rib (1990) – Yevgeny Anatolyevich
- My Best Friend, General Vasili, Son of Joseph Stalin (1991) – Tolik Shustrov
- Tsar Ivan the Terrible (1991) – Boris Godunov
- The Flood (1994) – Andrei
- Empire Under Attack (2000) – Sergei Valerianovich Muromtsev
- Bandit Petersburg (2000-2001) – Gennady Petrovich Vashchanov
- Spetsnaz (2002) – Sergei Mikhailovich Svirin
- Dobrinya and the Dragon (2006) – Kolyvan (voice)
- Admiral (2008) – Nikolai Ottovich von Essen (voiced by Vladimir Dolinsky)

=== Dubbing ===
- Stuart Little (1999) – Smokey
- Gone in 60 Seconds (2000) – Otto Halliwell (Robert Duvall)
- Pearl Harbor (2001) – Captain Harold Thurman (Dan Aykroyd)
- Planet of the Apes (2001) – General Thade (Tim Roth)
- Spirited Away (2001) – Kamaji
- Treasure Planet (2002) – John Silver
- Kingdom of Heaven (2005) – Barisan of Ibelin (Liam Neeson)
