= The Blonde Around the Corner =

- Directed by: Vladimir Bortko
- Written by: Aleksandr Chervinsky
- Starring: Tatyana Dogileva; Andrey Mironov; Mark Prudkin; Yevgeniya Khanayeva; Yelena Solovey
- Cinematography: Ivan Bagaev, Valentin Komarov
- Music by: Isaak Shvarts
- Production company: Lenfilm
- Release date: 1984
- Running time: 83 minutes
- Country: Soviet Union
- Language: Russian

The Blonde Around the Corner (Russian: Блондинка за углом, romanized: Blondinka za uglom) is a 1984 Soviet romantic comedy directed by Vladimir Bortko. It tells the story of an astrophysicist who begins to work at a grocery store where he falls in love with a saleswoman. The film became Bortko's breakthrough.

== Plot ==
Former astrophysicist Nikolai Gavrilovich (Andrey Mironov) who spent fifteen years in a fruitless search for extraterrestrial life, neither aspiring or succeeding to acquire material wealth in life, by fate gets the post of a porter at a local self-service supermarket, where he falls in love with Nadezhda (Tatyana Dogileva), a cute blonde salesgirl of the gastronomic department, whom as it turned out, he saw every morning at the bus stop. She is also fond of him. It is immediately obvious that the businesslike and living below her means Nadezhda is the antithesis of Nikolai — she is practical, penetrating, knows all the "right people" (and she herself is such — due to her access to coveted food products). But at the same time she is a hopeless romantic and listens to Nikolai's stories about his scientific quests.

Charming Nadezhda as a salesperson is a genuine authority on the "real" life, to which she seeks to involve Nikolai, and sincerely does not understand his stubborn opposition towards her efforts. But she has decided everything and has all planned out. However, unable to cope with his new status and in such an atmosphere, Nikolai runs away from his own wedding.

After receiving a positive confirmation concerning his line of research, he returns to his old job and is leaving for a research trip to the Far North ... Nadezhda promises to get a radio telescope which is required for her beau's work, but is very difficult to obtain, and goes along with him.

== Cast ==
- Tatyana Dogileva as Nadezhda, shopgirl
- Andrey Mironov as Nikolay Gavrilovich Poryvaev, scientist-astronomer
- Mark Prudkin as Gavrila Maksimovich, Nikolay's father
- Yevgeniya Khanayeva as Tatyana Vasilyevna, Nikolay's mother
- Yelena Solovey as Regina, Nikolay's former bride
- Anatoly Slivnikov as Gena 'Crocodile', Nadezhda's brother
- Baadur Tsuladze as Rashid Rashidovich, head of meat department store
- Anatoly Ravikovich as store clerk
- Aleksei Zharkov as store clerk (voice by Yevgeny Kindinov)
- Pavel Kadochnikov as Ogurtsov, scientist-astronomer, Nikolay's chief (voice by Igor Efimov)
