= Aleksandr Bryantsev =

Russian theatre director (1883–1961)

- Александр Брянцев
- Born: 14 April 1883; Saint Petersburg, Russian Empire
- Died: 30 September 1961 (aged 78); Leningrad, Russian SFSR, Soviet Union
- Occupations: Actor, theater director, pedagogue

Aleksandr Aleksandrovich Bryantsev (Note: Russian: Александр Александрович Брянцев, romanized: Aleksandr Aleksandrovich Bryantsev) (14 April 1883 – 30 September 1961) was a Soviet and Russian actor, theater director and pedagogue.

He was born in Saint Petersburg to an official's family and graduated from Second Saint Petersburg Gymnasium in 1902.

== Awards and honours ==
- Honoured Worker of the Arts Industry of the RSFSR (1932)
- Three Orders of the Red Banner of Labour (1939, 1946, 1953)
- People's Artist of the RSFSR (1939)
- Stalin Prize, 2nd class (1950)
- People's Artist of the USSR (1956)
- Order of the Badge of Honour (1957)
- Medal "For Valiant Labour in the Great Patriotic War 1941–1945"
- Medal "In Commemoration of the 250th Anniversary of Leningrad"
