= Zinovy Korogodsky =

Zinovy Yakovlevich Korogodsky (Russian: Зиновий Яковлевич Корогодский; July 29, 1926, Tomsk, USSR – May 22, 2004, St. Petersburg, Russia) was a Russian theater director, Professor, People's Artist of the RSFSR, winner of the Stanislavsky Award, an honorary professor of the Yaroslav-the-Wise Novgorod State University.

In 1950 he graduated from the Russian State Institute of Performing Arts. He worked in the theaters of Leningrad, Kaluga, Kaliningrad. In 1962-1986 he was the leader of the Leningrad Young People’s Theatre.

In 1986 he was convicted on false charges of sodomy, but the sentence was canceled and the case closed for lack of evidence. He was head of the laboratory young playwrights Russia.

In 1991, Zinovy Kogorodky created an experimental Teatr Pokoleniy in Saint Petersburg and later worked as its artistic director. Since 2004, the theater had been headed by his son Danila Korogodsky.

In 2001, he was appointed a professor at Yaroslav-the-Wise Novgorod State University where he taught until his death in 2004. He received an honorary professor of the University (posthumously).

He was buried in Komarovo, Saint Petersburg.
