= Afghan Breakdown =

Afghan Breakdown (Афганский излом)
- Russian DVD cover
- Directed by: Vladimir Bortko
- Written by: Leonid Bogachuk; Aleksandr Chervinsky; Mikhail Leshchinskiy; Ada Petrova
- Produced by: Aleksandr Golutva
- Starring: Michele Placido (Russian voice by Oleg Yankovsky); Mikhail Zhygalov; Aleksei Serebryakov; Yuri Kuznetsov; Tatyana Dogileva; Vladimir Yeryomin; Slava N. Jakovleff
- Cinematography: Valeri Fedosov; Pavel Zasyadko
- Edited by: Mauro Bonanni
- Music by: Vladimir Dashkevich
- Production company: Lenfilm
- Release date: 1991
- Running time: 140 minutes
- Countries: Soviet Union; Italy
- Languages: Russian, Italian

Afghan Breakdown (Russian: Афганский излом, romanized: Afganskiy izlom) is a 1991 war drama film about the Soviet–Afghan War directed by Vladimir Bortko and co-produced by Italy and the Soviet Union (Lenfilm). Michele Placido plays the protagonist, Major Bandura, a commander of a unit of Soviet paratroopers, co-starring with several popular Soviet actors. Director Vladimir Bortko invited Mikhail Leshchinskiy (a Soviet TV war reporter who worked in Afghanistan for 4.5 years) as a co-writer and visited Kabul and Kandahar in 1988 to research on the ground.

== Plot ==
The events unfold just before the start of the Soviet withdrawal from Afghanistan in 1988. Lieutenant Steklov, son of a high-ranking general, is assigned to Afghanistan, hoping to take part in combat and earn some medals before the war ends. Sgt. Arsionov (Aleksei Serebryakov) combines his combat experience and bravery with brutal hazing of young conscripts back on the field base. Major Bandura's tour of duty as commander of the paratrooper-assault battalion has expired; he is free to go home and reunite with his wife whom he has almost forgot. This means leaving his mistress Katya (Tatyana Dogileva), a nurse in the base's hospital, much to the anticipation of Bandura's superior Leonid, commander of the paratrooper-assault regiment (Mikhail Zhygalov), who is in love with Katya. Anxiety is felt by many characters about the politico-social changes taking place back in the Soviet Union during Perestroika. Bandura himself thinks he might not be able to adapt. Katya says that Afghanistan will be remembered as the best part of their lives.

The Soviets arrange a deal with a local Afghan warlord that he will not take action against the withdrawing Soviet troops in exchange for weapons and supplies. When asked why he needs more weapons as the war seems to be coming to an end, he replies that his war will go on for a very long time. On its way back to base the convoy that has delivered the supplies is ambushed by another faction of the Mujahideen. The paratroopers take cover and fight back with only a few casualties, but the road is blocked by a damaged fuel tanker. While Bandura personally drives a tank to push the tanker off the road, the inexperienced Steklov dashes forward attempting to lead troops to counterattack and is badly wounded. Later, his leg is amputated at the hospital, which adds to the stack of Bandura's career problems. Bandura decides to stay with his men for a while and lead a retaliatory mission to kill a Mujahideen leader, who is presumed wounded and taken to the neutral warlord's village. When the preparations are finished, Bandura comes to say goodbye to Katya, who is scheduled to leave the country on the morrow. A junkie soldier at the hospital insults him by insubordination but Bandura suddenly shows no will for disciplining him. Instead, he requests to be replaced by some other officer on the mission, citing a sore foot as a pretext. But after realization that his company is setting out, he resumes command. It goes awry again when the neutral warlord is accidentally killed in the raid and his men become hostile, and, together with the Mujahideen, attack the paratroopers. Bandura is able to pull his unit out mostly intact, but they are pinned down and call in an Mi-24 airstrike that obliterates the village. After the strike, Bandura becomes apathetic, and without apparent reason, re-enters the village alone. He finds nobody alive except for a 10-year boy clinging to a Chinese Type 56 assault rifle. Bandura hesitates, unsure what to do, then walks away, allowing the boy to shoot him in the back and kill him. The final scene shows dozens of Soviet helicopters flying away from the devastated village.

== See also ==
- The 9th Company
- The Beast
- Lone Survivor (film)
