= Playboy Club (Las Vegas) =

Former casino nightclub in Las Vegas, Nevada

Coordinates: 36.115309°N 115.198109°W

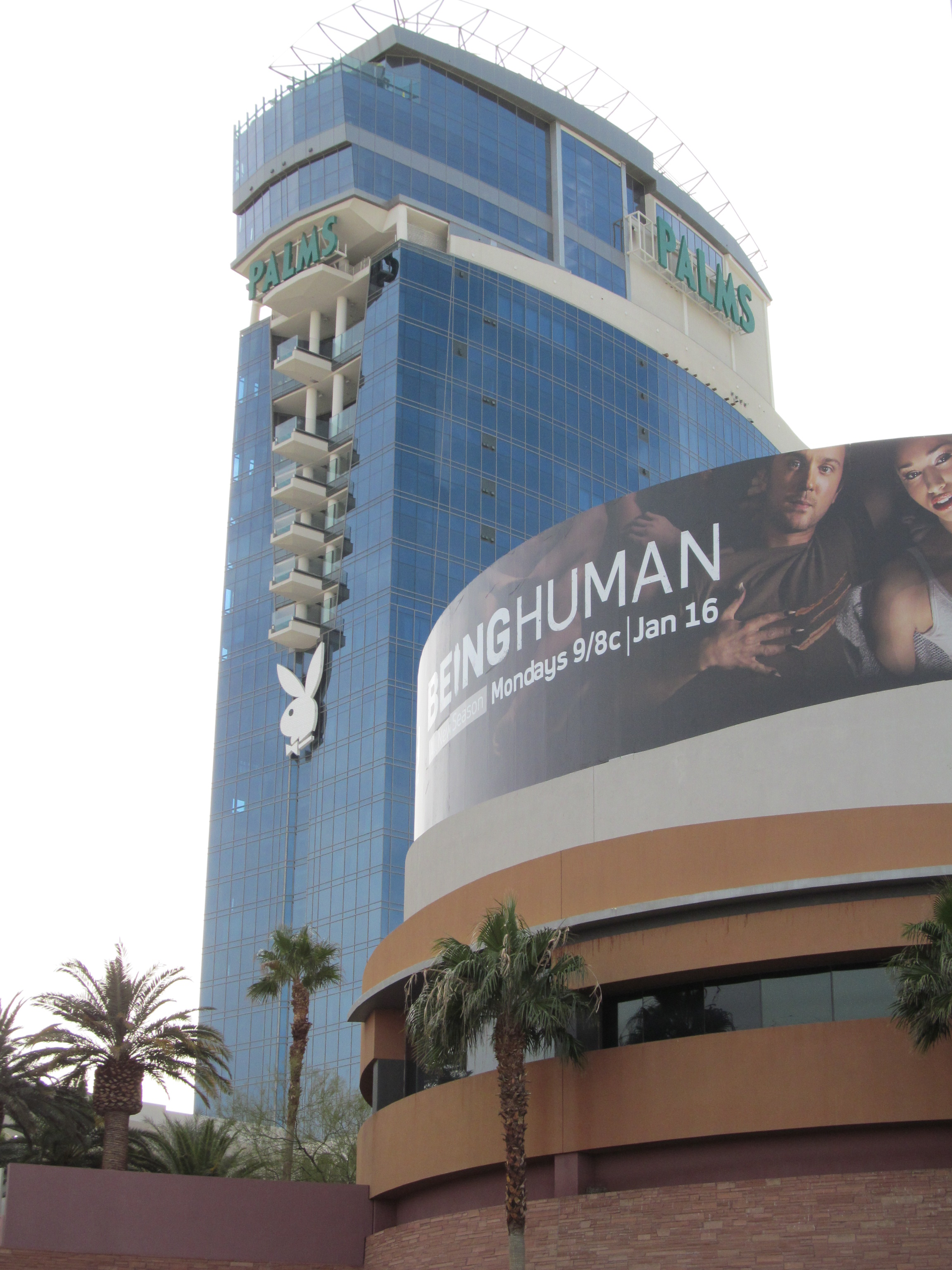
The Palms in Paradise, Nevada

The Playboy Club was a nightclub located on the 52nd floor of the Fantasy Tower at the Palms Casino Resort in Paradise, Nevada, which is located in the Las Vegas Valley. The club was a Playboy-themed casino and the first official Playboy Club in the United States since 1988. The club opened in October 2006 and closed in June 2012.

== Design and layout ==
The club featured floor-to-ceiling windows, Baccarat crystal chandeliers, a VIP area with its own bar, a fireplace and two retro Playboy brand pinball machines. The trademark Playboy Bunny logo was prominently displayed throughout the club, even the bathrooms. The Playboy Club offered gaming in the form of blackjack and roulette tables. The 12,500 sq ft (1,160 m^{2}) space also featured a small dance floor and was linked via escalators to MOON Nightclub, a boutique dance club on the 53rd floor.

While Hugh Hefner had input in the design of the Playboy Club, he said most of the credit goes to the Maloof family and the Las Vegas-based entertainment company that helped open the club, N9NE Group. Michael Morton, a principal of N9NE Group, is the son of Chicago restaurateur Arnie Morton, one of Hefner's partners in the launch of the original Playboy Club.

== History ==
Early plans had the name of the tower being the Playboy Tower.
