= Vladimir Bortko =

Soviet and Russian film director, screenwriter and producer

- Владимир Бортко
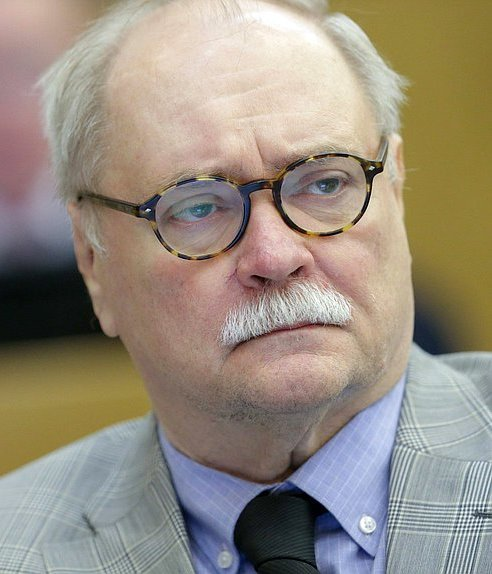
- Vladimir Bortko in 2018

Member of the State Duma for Saint Petersburg
- In office 5 October 2016 – 12 October 2021
- Constituency: Central St. Petersburg (No. 216)

Member of the State Duma (Party List Seat)
- In office 21 December 2011 – 5 October 2016

Personal details
- Born: 7 May 1946 (age 80) Moscow, RSFSR, Soviet Union
- Party: CPRF
- Education: Karpenko-Kary State University of Theatre, Film and Television
- Occupation: Director, screenwriter, producer, politician

Vladimir Vladimirovich Bortko (Russian: Владимир Владимирович Бортко; born 7 May 1946) is a Russian film director, screenwriter, producer and politician. He was a member of the State Duma between 2011 and 2021, and was awarded the title of People's Artist of Russia.

== Biography ==
Bortko was born 7 May 1946 in Moscow. In 1969 he went to the Karpenko-Kary State University of Theatre, Film and Television in Kyiv. In 1980, Vladimir Bortko became production leader in the Kinostudiya Lenfilm in Leningrad.

In 1991 he made Afghan Breakdown, a Soviet-Italian film about the Soviet withdrawal from Afghanistan with Michele Placido in the lead, critical of the Soviet military activity. During the troubled shooting that started in Tajikistan in 1990 one of the team members, Nikita Matrosov, was killed by Tajik ultra-nationalists following the 1990 Dushanbe riots. According to Bortko, most of their equipment was destroyed as well, the team was evacuated, and the shooting was finished in Crimea and Syria.

After the turn of the century Vladimir Bortko realized two of the biggest projects in the history of Russian cinema for the television channel Telekanal Rossiya. The first was an adaptation of the novel The Idiot written by the Russian author Fyodor Dostoevsky into a television series of 10 episodes in 2002. The series clinched all the major television prizes in Russia, and actor Yevgeny Mironov received the award for Best Actor at the Monte Carlo Television Festival.

Three years later followed an adaptation of the novel The Master and Margarita written by Mikhail Bulgakov, also into a TV series of 10 episodes. The first broadcast of 19 December 2005 was preceded by months of controversy in the media.

In 2009, Bortko caused another big controversy, with his film adaptation of the historical novel Taras Bulba written by the Russian author Nikolai Gogol. This time the criticism came from Ukraine, because while Bortko allowed the Polish actors in the film to speak Polish, the Ukrainian Cossacks had to express themselves in poor Russian.

Bortko is a member of the Communist Party of the Russian Federation (CPRF).

In March 2014 he signed a letter in support of the position of the President of Russia Vladimir Putin on Russian annexation of Crimea.

In 2022, during the Russian invasion of Ukraine, Bortko cried live on TV as a result of the sinking of the Russian cruiser Moskva in the Black Sea, saying that this was "a real casus belli for the war against Ukraine".

== Major projects ==
=== Film and television ===
- 1974 – Doctor (thesis short film)
- 1975 – Channel
- 1980 – My Father Is an Idealist
- 1984 – Without Family
- 1984 – The Blonde Around the Corner
- 1987 – Once Lied
- 1988 – Heart of a Dog
- 1991 – Afghan Breakdown
- 1998 – The Circus Burned Down, and the Clowns Have Gone
- 2000 – Gangsters of Saint Petersburg (TV series)
- 2002 – The Idiot (TV series)
- 2005 – The Master and Margarita (TV series)
- 2009 – Taras Bulba
- 2011 – Peter the Great: The Testament

=== Theatre ===
- 1993 – Oedipus Rex
- 2010 – Malleus Maleficarum

== Literature ==
- Ljutskanov, Yordan; Manolakev, Hristo; Rusev, Radostin (2014). Russian Classical Literature Today: The Challenges/Trials of Messianism and Mass Culture. Cambridge Scholars. ISBN 978-1-4438-5904-2.
- Yoon, Saera; Efird, Robert (2019). "Kurosawa, Bortko and the Conclusion of Dostoevsky's Idiot". CLCWeb: Comparative Literature and Culture. 21 (4).
