= Sherlock Holmes and Dr. Watson =

1979 film directed by Igor Maslennikov

- Russian: Шерлок Холмс и доктор Ватсон
- Based on: The Adventures of Sherlock Holmes by A. Conan Doyle
- Written by: Igor Maslennikov; Yuli Dunsky; Valeri Frid
- Directed by: Igor Maslennikov
- Starring: Vasily Livanov; Vitaly Solomin; Rina Zelyonaya
- Music by: Vladimir Dashkevich
- Country of origin: Soviet Union
- Original language: Russian

Production
- Producer: Lenfilm
- Cinematography: Yuri Veksler
- Editor: Lyudmila Obrazumova
- Running time: 135 min (in 2 episodes)

Original release
- Release: 1979

Sherlock Holmes and Dr. Watson (Russian: Шерлок Холмс и доктор Ватсон) is a 1979 Soviet film adaptation of Arthur Conan Doyle's novels about Sherlock Holmes. Directed by Igor Maslennikov, it is the first of a 5-part TV film series (divided into 11 episodes) The Adventures of Sherlock Holmes and Dr. Watson. The film is divided into two episodes: "The Acquaintance" (Знакомство, based on the 1892 short story "The Adventure of the Speckled Band") and "Bloody Inscription" (Кровавая надпись, based on the 1887 novel A Study in Scarlet).

The movies are made close to the plot of the books, but have some notable, and sometimes quite humorous differences, e.g. Dr. Watson within first weeks of living in Baker Street was trying to figure out what was Holmes profession. Upon witnessing Holmes dressed in disguise, seeing some strange visitors, Watson comes to a conclusion that Holmes is a criminal mastermind.

== Plot ==
=== The Acquaintance ===
Dr Watson, seeking an apartment after returning from military service in the colonies, is recommended the vacancy on 221B Baker Street by a friend of Sherlock Holmes, Stamford, who nonetheless warns of Holmes' eccentric and antisocial disposition. Watson is amazed by Holmes' forensic and deductive skills and flabbergasted by his complete ignorance on any topics not pertaining to crime and murder. He is further unnerved by Holmes's strange visitors and lack of identifiable occupation, and confides to Stampford that he suspects Holmes of being a criminal mastermind. Watson challenges Holmes to a boxing match, where Holmes deduces Watson's suspicions and instead identifies himself as a world-class detective.

Happy to demonstrate his profession, Holmes has Watson sit in with his next client, a fearful young woman named Helen Stoner. Stoner recounts the mysterious death of her sister Julia years earlier and fears the same fate herself after having to sleep in Julia's old room, naming her abusive stepfather Dr. Roylott as the suspect. Watson diagnoses Stoner with mere familial resentment, but is disproven when Roylott barges in and violently threatens the two of them for interacting with Stoner. Holmes inspects Julia Stoner's bedroom while Roylott is away, noting the strange ventilation shaft connecting the room with Roylott's. That night Holmes and Watson hide in the room with Stoner until Roylott believes her to be asleep, at which point Holmes lights a match and sees a venomous snake coming through the shaft. He beats it back with a cane and breaks into Roylott's room, where the trio find that the enraged snake had returned and fatally bitten its owner. Holmes waives Stoner's fee and returns home to discuss the case with Watson by the fire.

=== The Bloody Inscription ===
Now with Watson as his full-time assistant, Holmes is invited by Inspector Gregson to investigate the death of an American named Enoch Drebber. Holmes finds a gold ring and deduces the case to be a murder by poisoning, but clashes with Inspector Lestrade over the direction of the investigation. Holmes advertises finding the ring and receives an elderly female visitor who claims the ring is her late husband's, only for her to steal the ring, fight her way past Watson, and escape in a cabby. Holmes deduces the woman to have been a crossdressing accomplice and assures Watson they are already close to the killer's identity. Lestrade tracks down Drebber's correspondent and rival, Joseph Stangerson, as the main suspect, only to find him stabbed to death in a hotel room. Holmes finds two pills at the scene and, after they are accidentally eaten by Lestade's dog, it is found one was harmless while the other was a deadly poison. Holmes discusses the case with Watson, Lestrade, and Gregson only to suddenly double over in apparent pain. A cabby is called over only for Holmes to arrest the driver, Jefferson Hope, as the murderer.

Hope confesses in custody, explaining Drebber and Stangerson to have been Mormon polygamists who kidnapped Hope's fiancé Lucy for a forced marriage, leading to her death of grief and shame. He confirms Holmes' version of events, having intended for both of the victims to die by a 50/50 chance, but shows no remorse for his actions. Discussing the case by the fire, Holmes describes finding Hope's name from Drebber's remaining correspondence in Cleveland, but laments that a detective's duty is to find the truth of a crime, even if one finds the perpetrator to be more sympathetic than his victims. Watson reads a report on the case in the Times but is angered to find the credit had been given entirely to Gregson and Lestrade, and vows to write down Holmes' stories to be popularized across the world.

== Cast ==
- Vasily Livanov as Sherlock Holmes
- Vitaly Solomin as Dr. Watson
- Rina Zelyonaya as Mrs. Hudson

=== The Acquaintance ===
- Gennadi Bogachyov as Stamford
- Maria Solomina as Helen Stoner and Julia Stoner
- Fedor Odinokov as Dr. Roylott (voiced by Igor Yefimov)

=== Bloody Inscription ===
- Borislav Brondukov as Inspector Lestrade (voiced by Igor Yefimov)
- Igor Dmitriev as Inspector Gregson
- Nikolai Karachentsov as Jefferson Hope
- Viktor Aristov as Joseph Stangerson
- Adolf Ilyin as Enoch Drebber
- Boris Klyuyev as Mycroft Holmes (uncredited)
