= Vasily Livanov =

Russian actor and filmmaker (born 1935)

Vasily Livanov MBE
- Василий Ливанов
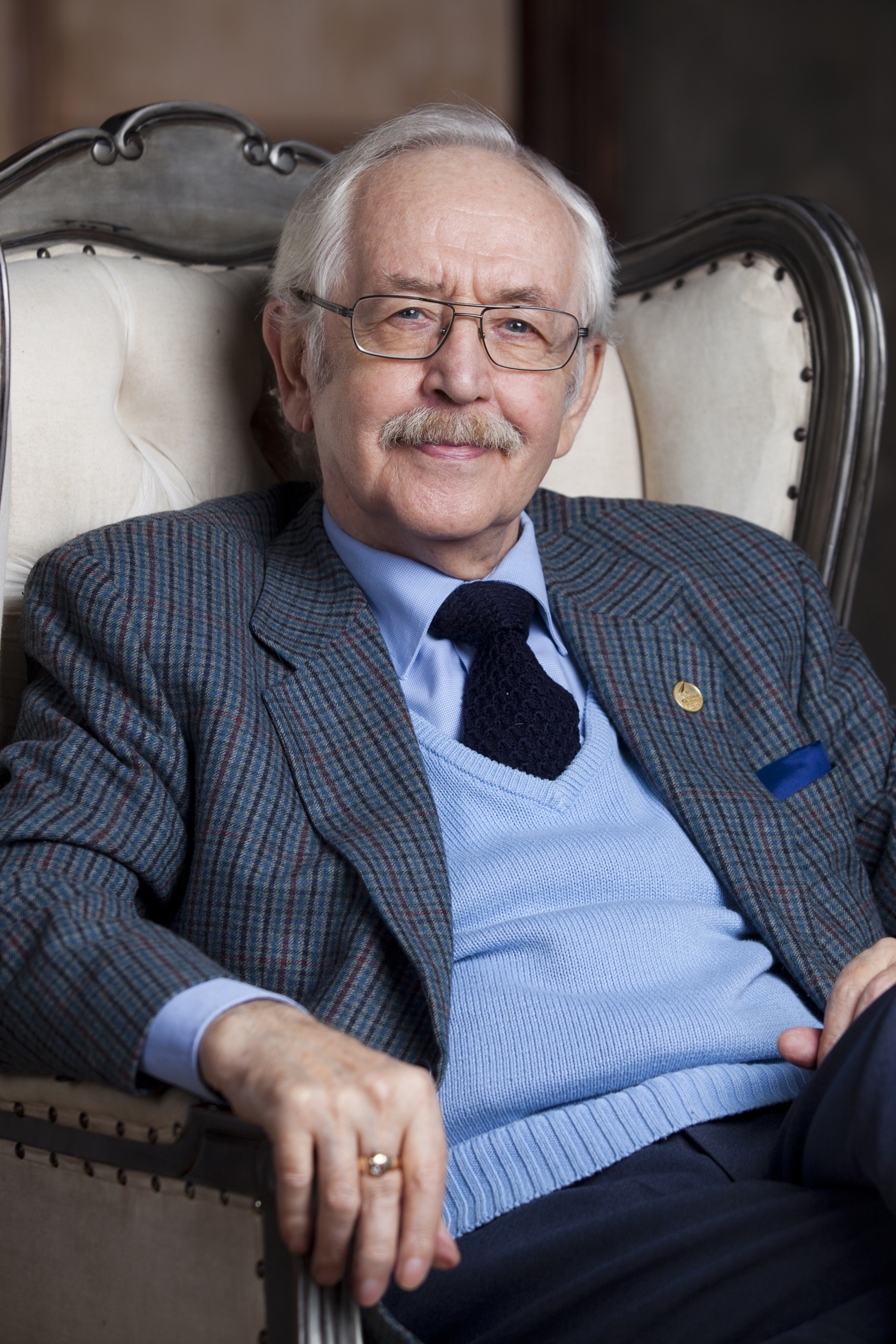
- Livanov in 2015
- Born: Vasily Borisovich Livanov; 19 July 1935 (age 91); Moscow, Russian SFSR, Soviet Union
- Occupations: Actor; animation director; film director; screenwriter; writer
- Years active: 1959–present
- Spouses: Alina Engelgardt (m. 1958–1970); Elena Livanova (m. 1972)
- Children: 3
- Parents: Boris Livanov (father); Evgenia Livanova (mother)
- Website: 221b.ru

Vasily Borisovich Livanov (Russian: Василий Борисович Ливанов; born 19 July 1935), MBE, is a Soviet and Russian film actor, animation and film director, screenwriter and writer most famous for portraying Sherlock Holmes in the Soviet TV series. He was named People's Artist of the RSFSR in 1988.

== Early years ==
Vasily Livanov was born into a famous theatrical family. His paternal grandfather Nikolai Aleksandrovich Livanov (1874–1949) was a Volga Cossack from Simbirsk who moved to Moscow in 1905 and performed at the Struysky Theatre under a pseudonym of Izvolsky; after the revolution he worked at the Mossovet and Lenkom Theatres. Vasily's father Boris Livanov (1904–1972) was also a prominent actor and stage director who served at the Moscow Art Theatre all his life, while his mother Eugenia Kazimirovna Livanova (née Prawdzic-Filipowicz) (1907–1978) was an artist who belonged to Polish szlachta.

Vasily was brought up in the artistic milieu. Many famous actors who worked with his father, like Olga Knipper, Alla Tarasova, Vasily Kachalov (whom Livanov was named after), as well as Pyotr Konchalovsky, Boris Pasternak, Valery Chkalov were frequent guests at their house. In 1940 his family was staying in Chernivtsi along with other Moscow actors, and his Polish nanny took him to the local Catholic church where he was baptized, presumably with his mother's permission. Today he belongs to the Russian Orthodox Church despite never officially converting.

His family spent the first war years in evacuation and in 1943 returned to Moscow. In 1954 Vasily graduated from the Moscow Secondary Art School under the USSR Academy of Arts, and in 1958 he finished the acting courses at the Boris Shchukin Theatre Institute.

His film career started in 1959 with one of the leading roles in the Letter Never Sent. The movie was shot in taiga at −40 °C, and the director Mikhail Kalatozov decided that Livanov and Samoilova should voice their characters shouting not in the studio, but outside, right in the woods. As a result, Livanov lost his voice, and in two weeks it returned as a unique hoarse timbre that would become one of Livanov's trademarks ever since.

== Animation ==
In 1966, he finished the High Directors Courses where he studied under Mikhail Romm and joined Soyuzmultfilm as an animation director, screenwriter and voice actor. During the next ten years he wrote and directed several animated films, including Most, Most, Most, Most and The Blue Bird feature.

Yet his biggest success came with The Bremen Town Musicians animated musical, a modernised adaptation of the eponymous folktale he created with Yuri Entin and Gennady Gladkov. Both parts showed heavy influence of rock and roll and hippie cultures which was unusual for the Soviet cinema. The first film was directed by Inessa Kovalevskaya, while the sequel On the Trail of the Bremen Town Musicians (1973) was directed by Livanov himself. The leading Soviet pop singer Muslim Magomayev voiced almost all characters in it which only added to the overwhelming popularity of the series (Oleg Anofriyev did the exact same thing in the first film).

Livanov was also the voice behind multiple popular Soviet animated characters such as Gena the Crocodile from the Cheburashka series, Karlsson-on-the-Roof from the Soviet adaptation of Astrid Lindgren's fairy tale and Boa from 38 Parrots.

== Sherlock Holmes ==
In the late 1970s and in the 1980s, Livanov returned to film stardom in what became the greatest success of his acting career: the role of Sherlock Holmes in The Hound of the Baskervilles and other Holmes TV series directed by Igor Maslennikov. Those movies were filmed between 1979 and 1986. Vitaly Solomin played Holmes's friend Dr. Watson.

On 27 April 2007, a sculpture featuring Holmes and Watson as portrayed by Livanov and Solomin was opened on the Smolenskaya embankment alongside the Embassy of the United Kingdom in Moscow (sculptor Andrey Orlov).

== Writer ==
Apart from screenplays Vasily Livanov has been professionally writing books since the 1960s. He published novels, stories, fairy tales and memoirs, including biography books dedicated to Boris Livanov, Boris Pasternak and other people he personally knew.

== Personal life ==
Livanov was married twice. His first wife (1958–1970) was Alina Engelgardt, daughter of the acclaimed Soviet biochemist Vladimir Engelgardt. They had a daughter Anastasia. Since 1972, he has been married to Elena Artemievna Balabanova, an art director and animator. They have two sons, Boris and Nikolai. In 2009, Boris was charged with a murder of Igor Khromov whom he cut with a knife during a drunken brawl; he was imprisoned for nine years, but set free following a parole in 2015. In June 2017, Maria Golubkina, an actress, daughter of Larisa Golubkina and stepdaughter of Andrei Mironov, announced her engagement to Boris Livanov, but in just a month they "decided to take a break".

Vasily Livanov was a close friend of Vitaly Solomin and Rina Zelyonaya, who played Doctor Watson and Mrs. Hudson. As he writes in his memoir:

"It happens so that when someone passes away, we customarily treat his actions and related events as the thing of the past. But everything about my beloved closest friend and partner Vitaly Solomin has become a part of my way of life, my conscience, so for me it will become the thing of the past only when I pass away too."

He is a staunch supporter of Vladimir Putin and his policies against Ukraine, supporting both the 2014 annexation of Crimea and the 2022 Russian invasion of Ukraine.

== Awards and honors ==
- Heinrich Greif Prize (1969)
- Honored Artist of the RSFSR (27 November 1981)
- People's Artist of the RSFSR (18 April 1988)
- Order "For Merit to the Fatherland", 4th class (1 December 2005) — "For substantial contribution to the development of national cinema".
- Honorary Member of the Order of the British Empire (20 February 2006) — "For service to the theatre and performing arts".
- Order of Honour (26 October 2016) — "For great services in the development of national culture and arts, many years of fruitful activity".
- Special Golden Eagle Award (27 January 2017) — "For outstanding contribution to the history of Russian cinema".
- Order of Holy Prince Daniel of Moscow, 2nd class

== Filmography ==
=== Live action ===
- Letter Never Sent (1960) as Andrei
- Resurrection (1960) as Kryltsov
- Blind Musician (1960) as Pyotr Popelsky
- Judgment of the Mad (1961) as Johannes Werner
- Colleagues (1962) as Sasha Zelenin
- The Blue Notebook (1963) as Felix Dzerzhinsky
- The Green Light (1964) as Oleg Nikolayevich Korzhikov
- Year as Long as Life (1966) as Georg Weerth
- I Was Nineteen (1968) as Wadim Geiman
- Waterloo (1970) as officer of Wellington's retinue
- The Star of Captivating Happiness (1975) as Nicholas I of Russia
- The Steppe (1977) as Kazimir
- Sherlock Holmes and Dr. Watson (1979) as Sherlock Holmes
- The Adventures of Sherlock Holmes and Dr. Watson (1980) as Sherlock Holmes
- The Hound of the Baskervilles (1981) as Sherlock Holmes
- The Treasures of Agra (1983) as Sherlock Holmes
- Moon Rainbow (1983) as Galbraith
- The Twentieth Century Approaches (1987) as Sherlock Holmes
- Friend (1987) as Friend's voice
- Don Quixote Returns (1997) as Don Quixote
- The Master and Margarita (2005) as Professor Stravinsky

=== Animation ===
==== Voice acting ====
- Junior and Karlson (1968) as Karlsson-on-the-Roof
- Gena the Crocodile (1969) as Gena the Crocodile
- Karlson Returns (1970) as Karlsson-on-the-Roof
- Cheburashka (1971) as Gena the Crocodile
- Shapoklyak (1974) as Gena the Crocodile
- 38 Parrots (1976–1991) as Boa
- Dog in Boots (1981) as English Detective
- The Mystery of the Third Planet (1981) as Gromozeka
- Cheburashka Goes to School (1983) as Gena the Crocodile
- The Pass (1988) as Boris

==== Other ====
- Most, Most, Most, Most (1966; director and screenwriter)
- The Bremen Town Musicians (1969; screenwriter; co-written with Yuri Entin)
- Ded Moroz and Summer (1969; screenwriter; co-written with Yuri Entin)
- The Blue Bird (1970; director and screenwriter)
- On the Trail of the Bremen Town Musicians (1973; director and screenwriter; co-written with Yuri Entin)
- The New Bremen Town Musicians (2000; screenwriter; co-written with Yuri Entin)
