= The Twentieth Century Approaches =

1987 mini series by Igor Maslennikov

- Russian: Двадцатый век начинается
- Based on: The Adventures of Sherlock Holmes by A. Conan Doyle
- Written by: Igor Maslennikov; Yuri Veksler
- Directed by: Igor Maslennikov
- Starring: Vasily Livanov; Vitaly Solomin; Rina Zelyonaya; Borislav Brondukov; Boris Klyuyev; Innokenti Smoktunovsky
- Music by: Vladimir Dashkevich
- Country of origin: Soviet Union
- Original language: Russian

Production
- Producer: Lenfilm
- Cinematography: Dmitri Dolinin; Vladimir Ilyin
- Editor: Lyudmila Obrazumova
- Running time: 102 minutes (in 2 parts)

Original release
- Release: April 1987

The Twentieth Century Approaches (Russian: Двадцатый век начинается) is a 1987 Soviet film adaptation of Arthur Conan Doyle's stories about Sherlock Holmes. It is the fifth and final film in The Adventures of Sherlock Holmes and Dr. Watson film series directed by Igor Maslennikov.

The film is based on four stories by Conan Doyle – "The Adventure of the Engineer's Thumb", "The Adventure of the Second Stain", "The Adventure of the Bruce-Partington Plans", and "His Last Bow".

== Cast ==
- Vasily Livanov as Sherlock Holmes
- Vitaly Solomin as Dr. Watson
- Rina Zelyonaya as Mrs. Hudson (uncredited)
- Borislav Brondukov as Inspector Lestrade (voiced by Igor Yefimov)
- Boris Klyuyev as Mycroft Holmes
- Innokenti Smoktunovsky as Prime Minister Lord Thomas Bellinger
- Aleksandr Romantsov as Sir Trelawney Hope, European Minister
- Yelena Safonova as Lady Hilda Trelawney-Hope
- Larisa Guzeyeva as Ma'am Anry Furnie
- Viktor Koretsky as Victor Hederly, Hydraulic Engineer
- Yevgeni Platokhin as Eduardo Lukas
- Yekaterina Zinchenko as Mrs. Watson
- Konstantin Vorobyov as Inspector Pitkin
- Maris Liepa as Colonel Valentine Walter
- Mikhail Morozov as Smith
- Vladimir Tatosov as Baron von Herling
- Leonid Kuravlyov as Von Bork (uncredited)
