= The Hound of the Baskervilles (1981 film) =

1981 miniseries by Igor Maslennikov

- DVD cover art
- Russian: Собака Баскервилей
- Based on: The Hound of the Baskervilles by Arthur Conan Doyle
- Screenplay by: Igor Maslennikov; Yuri Veksler
- Directed by: Igor Maslennikov
- Starring: Vasily Livanov; Vitaly Solomin; Rina Zelyonaya; Borislav Brondukov; Irina Kupchenko; Nikita Mikhalkov
- Music by: Vladimir Dashkevich
- Country of origin: Soviet Union
- Original language: Russian

Production
- Producer: Lenfilm
- Cinematography: Dmitri Dolinin; Vladimir Ilyin
- Running time: 147 minutes
- Production company: Lyudmila Obrazumova

Original release
- Release: 1981

The Hound of the Baskervilles (Russian: Приключения Шерлока Холмса и доктора Ватсона: Собака Баскервилей) is a 1981 Soviet television film adaptation of Arthur Conan Doyle's 1902 novel The Hound of the Baskervilles. It was the third instalment in the TV series about adventures of Sherlock Holmes and Doctor Watson.

Director Igor Maslennikov received acclaimed reviews from abroad, including a letter from Conan Doyle's daughter, who wrote: "Had my father lived to see this film, he would have been happy"; the Daily Mirror published a review quoting Margaret Thatcher, who called it "the best Sherlock Holmes film she had ever seen."[1]

At the Sherlock Holmes Museum at 221b Baker Street, London, very "British" music, written for this film by Vladimir Dashkevich, plays on a loop.

== Plot ==
In 1889, Dr. Mortimer approaches Sherlock Holmes and Dr. Watson with a disturbing case: the mysterious death of Sir Charles Baskerville, allegedly caused by a spectral hound that has plagued the Baskerville family for generations. Concerned for the safety of Sir Henry Baskerville, the estate's heir, Holmes sends Watson to accompany him to Baskerville Hall in Devonshire, where they encounter strange events, including a missing boot, ominous warnings, and suspicious neighbors like naturalist Jack Stapleton and his "sister" Beryl.

As Watson investigates, he discovers clues pointing to a sinister plot involving a real dog trained to terrorize the Baskervilles. Holmes, secretly observing from a distance, reveals Stapleton's true identity as a hidden heir to the Baskerville fortune, who used the family legend to drive Sir Charles to a fatal heart attack. In a climactic showdown, the giant hound attacks Sir Henry, but Holmes and Watson save him and expose Stapleton's plan. The villain escapes but ultimately perishes in the treacherous Grimpen Mire, leaving Holmes and Watson to ponder the unresolved mysteries surrounding the case.

== Production ==
The film features an all-star cast: in addition to the famous Livanov-Solomin duo as Holmes and Watson, the film stars the internationally acclaimed actor/director Nikita Mikhalkov as Sir Henry Baskerville and the Russian movie legend Oleg Yankovsky as Jack Stapleton. The hound uses the simple but effective device of painting a skull on the dog's face.

== Cast ==
- Vasily Livanov as Sherlock Holmes
- Vitaly Solomin as Dr. Watson
- Rina Zelyonaya as Mrs. Hudson
- Borislav Brondukov as Inspector Lestrade
- Irina Kupchenko as Beryl Stapleton
- Nikita Mikhalkov as Sir Henry Baskerville
- Alla Demidova as Laura Lyons
- Sergey Martinson as Mr. Frankland
- Oleg Yankovsky as Stapleton
- Aleksandr Adabashyan as Barrymore
- Svetlana Kryuchkova as Mrs. Barrymore
- Yevgeny Steblov as Dr. Mortimer
