= Winter Cherry =

1985 romantic comedy directed by Igor Maslennikov

- Directed by: Igor Maslennikov
- Written by: Vladimir Valutsky
- Produced by: Igor Vizgin
- Starring: Yelena Safonova; Vitaly Solomin; Ivars Kalniņš; Nina Ruslanova; Larisa Udovichenko; Alexander Lenkov
- Cinematography: Yuri Veksler
- Edited by: Zinaida Shorokhova; Lyudmila Obrazumova
- Music by: Vladimir Dashkevich
- Production companies: Lenfilm; The first creative association
- Release date: October 21, 1985
- Running time: 91 min
- Country: Soviet Union
- Language: Russian

Winter Cherry (Russian: Зимняя вишня, romanized: Zimnyaya vishnya) is a 1985 romantic comedy directed by Igor Maslennikov.

== Plot ==
The main character of the film is Olga (Yelena Safonova), a beautiful intelligent 30-year-old woman, resident of Soviet Leningrad who is a scientific researcher employed at an institute. She is divorced and is a single mother to her 5-year-old son Anton (Mikhail Poduschak). Olga tries to arrange her personal life and longs for happiness which she would attain with a loved one. Family, just like Homeland has to exist! Otherwise life makes no sense – muses the young woman. All her neighbor-friends are likewise unhappy in love; childless daycare educator Valya (Larisa Udovichenko) cohabiting with crude hockey player Alexander (Sergey Parshin), accountant of a carpool Larissa (Nina Ruslanova) who is divorced and raises her 5-year-old son Sergei

Olga loves and is loved, her son Anton is constantly by her side, but her 45-year-old companion is married and does not want to leave his family. Olga's infrequent, hurried meetings with her lover leave the young woman with a bitter aftertaste. Her suitor is a married selfish lover (her colleague from work) Vadim (Vitaly Solomin).

Olga leaves her son for five days at a kindergarten and tries to arrange her life. First off an old bachelor Veniamin (Alexander Lenkov) appears in her life, who is seemingly writing his thesis. In his 36 years, the man has never been married (still lives with his mother), and in general has a very naive view about family life. After their first evening together, he silently leaves the apartment of Olga, and then she has to urgently pick up Anton from the daycare.

Then in the woman's life prince charming appears; an imposing Muscovite Herbert (Ivars Kalniņš), working partially in the city and in Switzerland. He is handsome, intelligent, and well off. Even Larissa who regards all men with severe skepticism thinks that her friend has finally found a real man. When Olga and Anton leave for Moscow together with Herbert, Vadim finally understands who and what he loses... Olga gets rid of the prospective groom and returns with Anton and lover to Leningrad. However, the illusion of happiness does not last long. With the hope to find true love and a new father for Anton, Olga again remains alone with her son.

== Cast ==
- Yelena Safonova as Olga
- Vitaly Solomin as Vadim Dashkov
- Ivars Kalniņš as Gerbert
- Nina Ruslanova as Larisa
- Larisa Udovichenko as Valya
- Alexander Lenkov as Veniamin
- Sergey Parshin as Aleksandr
- Alla Osipenko as actress, Olga's former in-law
- Svetlana Kryuchkova as Vadim's wife
- Song dubbing Alla Pugacheva

== Production ==
The main role was originally to be played Natalya Andrejchenko and Sergey Shakurov. But at the last moment Andrejchenko refused to play and moved to the US with Maximilian Schell, and the role of Olga has been rewritten for Safonova. Shakurov barely starting his acting, also refused to work in the film, and the role of Vadim was approved for Vitaly Solomin, who had spent several years working with the director on the set of films from the series The Adventures of Sherlock Holmes and Dr. Watson. Nevertheless, in a scene on a fishing trip, where Vadim and Olga kissing, showing legs Shakurov.

== Awards ==
- 1986 — The 19th All-Union Film Festival (Alma-Ata) in a program of feature films:
  - Prize for his studies of actual moral problems
  - Best Actress Award — Yelena Safonova

== Sequels ==
- Winter Cherry 2 (1990)
- Winter Cherry 3 (1995)
