= Igor Maslennikov =

Soviet and Russian film director (1931–2022)

- Игорь Масленников
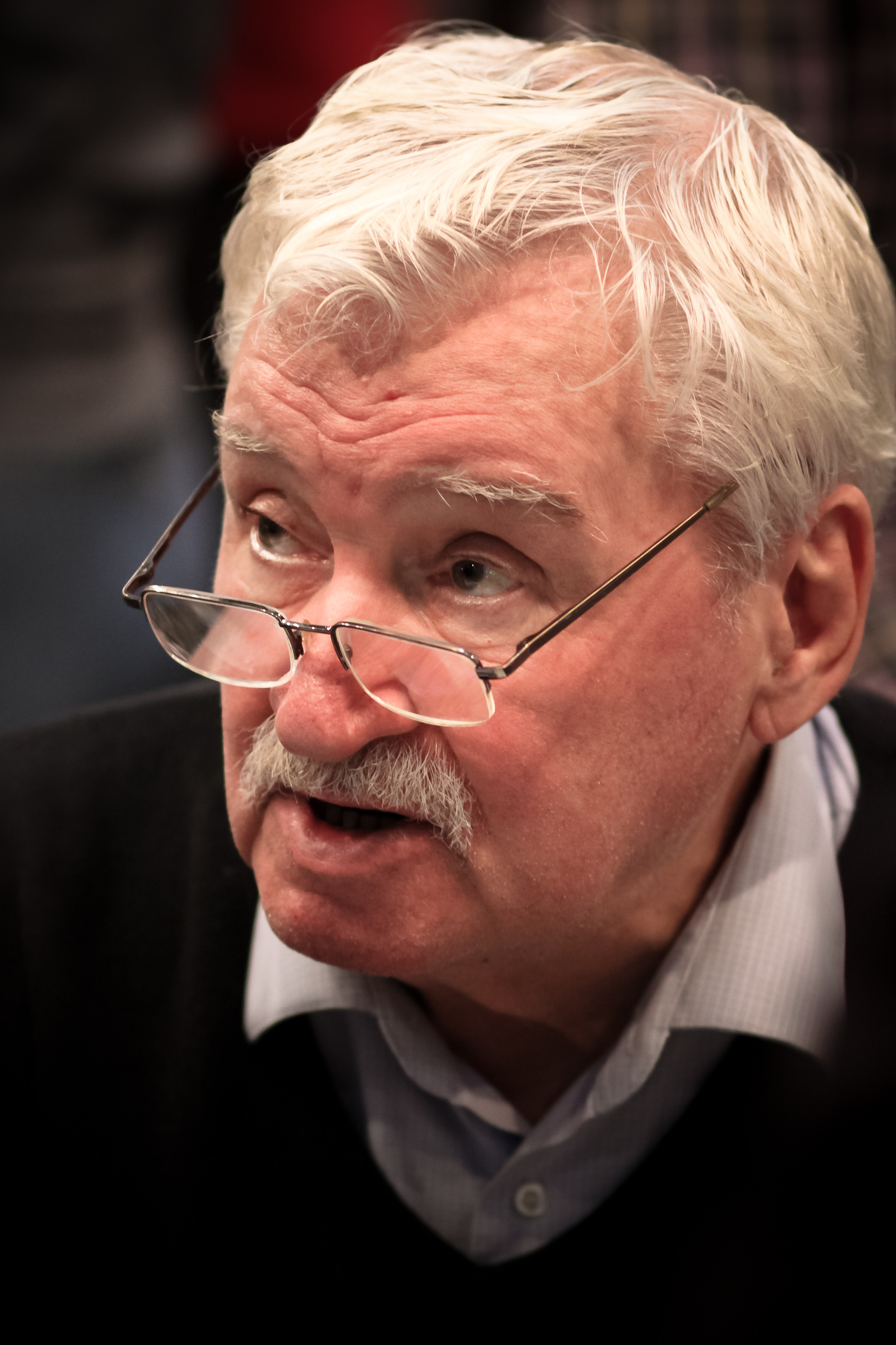
- Maslennikov in 2011
- Born: 26 October 1931; Nizhny Novgorod, Russian SFSR, Soviet Union
- Died: 17 September 2022 (aged 90); Saint Petersburg, Russia
- Occupations: Film director Screenwriter
- Years active: 1967–2002

Igor Fyodorovich Maslennikov (Russian: Игорь Фёдорович Масленников; 26 October 1931 – 17 September 2022) was a Soviet and Russian film director.

== Biography ==
Maslennikov was born in Nizhny Novgorod. In 1954 he completed his education in the department of journalism of the Leningrad University and worked as an editor, script writer, and cameraman on Leningrad television. In 1965 he entered the Higher Directors' Courses of Lenfilm (Grigori Kozintsev's workshop), at end of which he became the director of this motion picture studio.

In the cinema, Maslennikov made his debut at the end of the 1960s with a film about a senior pupil: the Personal Life of Kuzyaev Valentin. He directed children's films (Tomorrow and 3 April), movies about sports (Racers), historical costume-dramas (Yaroslavna, the Queen of France). He worked on the joint Soviet-Norwegian picture Under a Stone Sky, which narrates the sad events which occurred in one of the Norwegian towns during the Nazi occupation. He filmed Vera Panova's autobiographical Sentimental novel.

Enormous success came to Maslennikov when he directed a cycle of films about Sherlock Holmes and Doctor Watson. The successful selection of the actors, among whom there were Vasily Livanov, Vitaly Solomin, Boryslav Brondukov, Rina Zelyonaya, Nikita Mikhalkov and the outstanding talent of the director ensured audience's love of the film.

In 1985 Maslennikov presented the melodrama Winter Cherry. The movie became one of the greatest blockbusters of the decade and gained Yelena Safonova a wide reputation. The special feature of this everyday melodrama was that for the first time the spectator saw on the screen a strong but misunderstood woman played by Safonova. The popularity of this film inspired Maslennikov to create sequels in 1990 and 1995 and the same-name TV-series in 1997.

In 1989 Maslennikov filmed the television adventure picture Philipp Traum, based on the unfinished Mark Twain novel The Mysterious Stranger. The cinema version was named Chronicle of Satan Jr.. He made a co-production with French partners, filming the story of Leonid Andreyev (The Dark), where the main roles were played by Oleg Yankovsky and Kseniya Kachalina.

Maslennikov became People's Artist of the RSFSR in 1988. In 2001 he received the State Prize of the Russian Federation.

The year 2000 saw the release of the 10 series of Chto skazal pokoynik (What Has the Deceased Said) (2000) after the popular Polish writer Ioanna Khmelevskaya, and start of the filming of Vospominaniya o Sherloke Kholmse (The Memoirs of Sherlock Holmes), which united all the five famous Sherlock Holmes films with a single plotline. In 2001 he was a member of the jury at the 23rd Moscow International Film Festival.

By his 75th birthday in 2007 in collaboration with film director and publicist Oleksiy-Nestor Naumenko Igor Maslennikov finished his book of memoirs under the title The Baker Street in Petrogradskaya (ISBN 978-5-367-00592-9).

== Filmography ==
- Timur and His Commando, 2004
- Letters to Elsa, 2002: the Golden Peacock of the India International Film Festival
- Memories of Sherlock Holmes (TV series), 2000
- What the Dead Man Said (TV series), 1999
- Chekhonte Theater, 1996
- Winter Cherry (TV series), 1995
- Winter Cherry 3, 1995
- Darkness, 1991
- Winter Cherry 2, 1990
- Philip Traum (TV movie), 1989
- Genus Extension, 1988
- Adventures of Sherlock Holmes and Dr. Watson: The Twentieth Century Approaches (Приключения Шерлока Холмса и доктора Ватсона. Двадцатый век начинается, 1986)
- Winter Cherry, 1985
- The Adventures of Sherlock Holmes and Dr. Watson: The Treasures of Agra (Приключения Шерлока Холмса и доктора Ватсона. Сокровища Агры), 1983
- The Queen of Spades (Пиковая дама, 1982)
- Adventures of Sherlock Holmes and Dr. Watson: The Hound of the Baskervilles (Приключения Шерлока Холмса и доктора Ватсона. Собака Баскервилей, 1981
- The Adventures of Sherlock Holmes and Dr. Watson (Приключения Шерлока Холмса и доктора Ватсона), 1980
- Sherlock Holmes and Dr. Watson (Шерлок Холмс и доктор Ватсон), 1979
- Yaroslavna, Queen of France, 1978
- Sentimentalnyy roman, 1976
- Under the Stone Sky, 1974
- Racers, 1972
- Summer in Berezhki, 1970
- Tomorrow, on April 3rd... (Завтра, третьего апреля), 1969
- Private Life of Kuzyayev Valentin (Личная жизнь Кузяева Валентина), 1967
