= The Adventures of Sherlock Holmes and Dr. Watson (film) =

Soviet film adaptation of Sherlock Holmes

- Russian: Приключения Шерлока Холмса и доктора Ватсона
- Based on: "The Adventure of Charles Augustus Milverton", "The Final Problem", "The Adventure of the Empty House" by Arthur Conan Doyle
- Written by: Vladimir Valutskiy
- Directed by: Igor Maslennikov
- Starring: Vasily Livanov; Vitaly Solomin; Rina Zelyonaya; Boryslav Brondukov
- Music by: Vladimir Dashkevich
- Country of origin: Soviet Union
- Original language: Russian

Production
- Cinematography: Anatoly Lapshov; Yuri Veksler
- Editor: Lyudmila Obrazumova
- Running time: 203 min
- Production company: Lenfilm

Original release
- Release: 1980

The Adventures of Sherlock Holmes and Dr. Watson (Russian: Приключения Шерлока Холмса и доктора Ватсона) is a 1980 Soviet film adaptation of Arthur Conan Doyle's stories about Sherlock Holmes. It is the second film (episodes 3–5) in The Adventures of Sherlock Holmes and Dr. Watson film series directed by Igor Maslennikov.

The film is based on three short stories by Conan Doyle: "The Adventure of Charles Augustus Milverton", "The Final Problem", and "The Adventure of the Empty House".

== Plot ==
=== The King of Blackmail ===
Sherlock Holmes and Doctor Watson learn of the death by heart attack of a Lord Huxley. Holmes deduces the culprit to be Charles Milverton, the most feared blackmailer in London, who leaked evidence of Lady Huxley's infidelity after she refused to pay. Holmes' older brother Mycroft recruits the pair to deal with a similar case of Lady Eva Blackwell, set to be married. Milverton hears of Mycroft's request through an informant at the Diogenes Club and confronts the two at their Baker Street residence. Holmes and Watson attempt to reason with and then intimidate Milverton, but realize they have no legal course of action if they wish to preserve Blackwell's marriage.

The two break into Milverton's manor, but leave many pieces of evidence due to their inexperience. Holmes finds Blackwell's letters but the two are forced to hide after Milverton returns to the study. He meets with a new potential informant, only for her to reveal herself as the vengeful Lady Huxley and shoot Milverton, taking a strange letter to Milverton with her. Holmes destroys several stacks of letters including Blackwell's and the pair flee, though Watson loses a shoe in the process. They confront Huxley over the event and receive the letter to Milverton in return, marked with an "M" monogram formed from four crossed sabers.

=== The Deadly Engagement ===
Investigating various leads with an "M" surname, Holmes and Watson come upon Sebastian Moran, an expert sharpshooter and tiger hunter, who is confronted by one Ronald Adair over Moran cheating at a card game. Holmes is taken to the true originator of the "M" monogram, Professor Moriarty, who reveals Milverton's operation to have been just one chapter of an international crime organization headed by Moriarty and centered in London. Moriarty confronts Holmes with evidence of his involvement with Milverton's death, only for Holmes to daze Moriarty and escape with the evidence.

Holmes and Watson flee to Switzerland after 221B Baker Street is firebombed by Moriarty's men. Holmes states the evidence he provided to Inspector Lestrade means Moriarty's ring is mere days away from being dissolved. While visiting the Reichenbach Falls, Watson is called away by reports of a medical emergency at their hotel. Moriarty confronts Holmes for single combat, ready to die if it means defeating Holmes. Moran, revealed to be another accomplice, appears as the pair fight. Moriarty falls to his death after being wrestled to the edge, but Moran fires at Holmes' hands as he appears to lose his grip and fall to his own death. Watson realizes the emergency to have been fabricated by Holmes and rushes back to the Falls, only to find he was too late. He finds a final letter to him from Holmes, declaring Moriarty to have been the greatest case of his career and instructing Watson to monitor Adair.

=== The Hunt for the Tiger ===
Watson attempts to keep an eye on Adair, but draws suspicion in the ineptitude of his disguise. Adair is murdered in locked room by a revolver round through the open window, an impossibility given the distance of the nearest building, and Watson's obsession with Adair marks him as the primary suspect. Holmes reveals his survival to Watson and Hudson, explaining that while his destruction of Moriarty's ring was largely successful, Moran and a number of other members remained at large, preventing his return. They allow Moran's henchman to spot Holmes and arrange a trap for Moran with a lifelike wax sculpture of Holmes sitting in his study, which Moran shoots with a custom soundless air-gun before being arrested by Holmes. Discussing their adventures by the fire, Holmes explains he had spotted a ledge beneath where he and Morairty would fight, which he used to feign his death in order to fool Moran.

== Cast ==
- Vasily Livanov as Sherlock Holmes
- Vitaly Solomin as Dr. Watson
- Rina Zelyonaya as Mrs. Hudson
- Borislav Brondukov as Inspector Lestrade (voiced by Igor Yefimov)
- Boris Klyuyev as Mycroft Holmes
- Anatoly Podshivalov as Price the marker

=== The King of Blackmailers ===
- Boris Ryzhukhin as Charles Milverton
- Valentina Panina as Lady Huxley
- Svetlana Kryuchkova as Agatha, Milverton's maid

=== The Mortal Combat ===
- Nikolai Kryukov as Colonel Moran
- Viktor Yevgrafov as Professor Moriarty (voiced by Oleg Dahl)
- Alexander Zakharov as Ronald Adair (voiced by Vyacheslav Baranov)
- Alexey Kozhevnikov as Mr. Murray
- Ignat Leirer as Peter Steiller Jr.
- Yury Eller as Moriarty's henchman
- Igor Andronnikov as Moriarty's henchman

=== The Tiger Hunt ===
- Igor Dmitriev as Inspector Gregson
- Alexander Zakharov as Ronald Adair (voiced by Vyacheslav Baranov)
- Alexey Kozhevnikov as Mr. Murray
- Nikolai Kryukov as Colonel Moran
- Viktor Yevgrafov as Professor Moriarty (voiced by Oleg Dahl)
- Valery Smolyakov as the cabman
- Irina Kraslavskaya as Judy, Adair's maid
- E. Kharkevich as Adair's mother
- Alexander Zakharov as Adair's butler
