= The Adventures of Sherlock Holmes and Dr. Watson =

Soviet television film series

- This photograph of Vasily Livanov as Sherlock Holmes is displayed at the Sherlock Holmes Museum on Baker Street.
- Russian: Приключения Шерлока Холмса и доктора Ватсона
- Genre: Mystery; Period drama
- Based on: The Adventures of Sherlock Holmes by A. Conan Doyle
- Directed by: Igor Maslennikov
- Starring: Vasily Livanov; Vitaly Solomin
- Composer: Vladimir Dashkevich
- Country of origin: Soviet Union
- Original language: Russian
- No. of episodes: 11 episodes (5 films)

Production
- Producer: Lenfilm

Original release
- Release: 1979 – 1987

The Adventures of Sherlock Holmes and Dr. Watson (Russian: Приключения Шерлока Холмса и доктора Ватсона Priklyucheniya Sherloka Kholmsa i doktora Vatsona) is a series of Soviet television films portraying Arthur Conan Doyle's fictional English detective, starting in 1979. They were directed by Igor Maslennikov.

== Overview ==
Between 1979 and 1986, Soviet television produced a series of five films at the Lenfilm movie studio, split into eleven episodes, starring Vasily Livanov as Sherlock Holmes and Vitaly Solomin as Dr. Watson. The last film, The Twentieth Century Approaches, was shown in cinemas in 1987 (as Sherlock Holmes in the 20th Century), ahead of its 1988 television premiere.

=== Episodes ===
The series ran as follows:

- 1979 Sherlock Holmes and Dr. Watson
  - 1st episode: "Acquaintance" (based on "The Adventure of the Speckled Band").
  - 2nd episode: "Bloody Inscription" (based on "A Study in Scarlet").
- 1980 The Adventures of Sherlock Holmes and Dr. Watson
  - 1st episode: "The King of Blackmail" (based on "The Adventure of Charles Augustus Milverton").
  - 2nd episode: "Deadly Fight" (based on "The Final Problem").
  - 3rd episode: "The Tiger Hunt" (based on "The Adventure of the Empty House").
- 1981 The Adventures of Sherlock Holmes and Dr. Watson: The Hound of the Baskervilles. Two episodes based on "The Hound of the Baskervilles".
- 1983 The Adventures of Sherlock Holmes and Dr. Watson: The Treasures of Agra. Two episodes based on "The Sign of the Four" and "A Scandal in Bohemia".
- 1987 The Adventures of Sherlock Holmes and Dr. Watson: The Twentieth Century Approaches. Two episodes based on "The Adventure of the Engineer's Thumb", "The Adventure of the Second Stain", "The Adventure of the Bruce-Partington Plans" and "His Last Bow".

=== Production ===
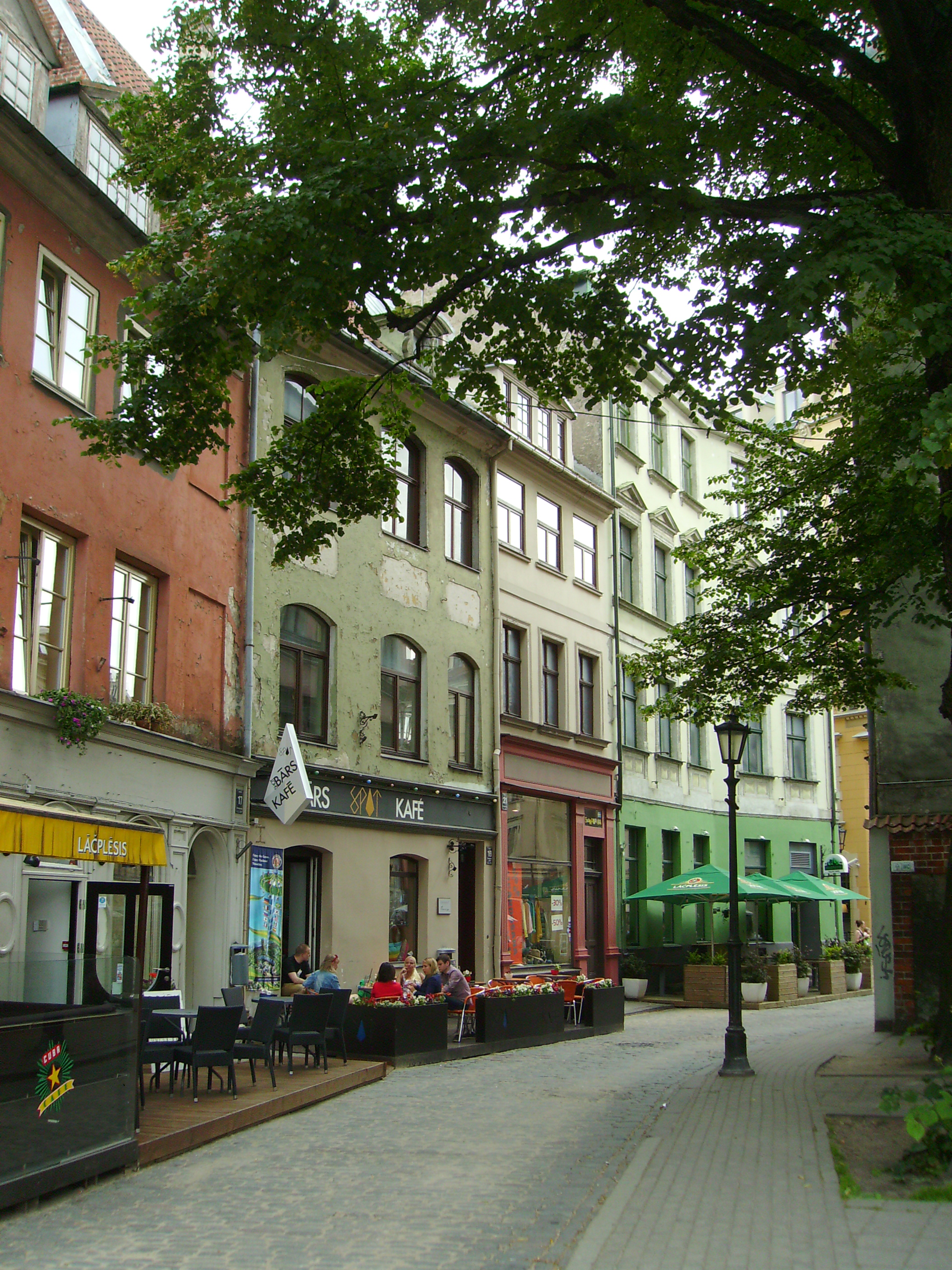
Jauniela street, in old Riga, doubles as Baker Street in the series.

The script was written by Julius Dunsky and Valery Frid on their own initiative. Igor Maslennikov was not a big fan of Conan Doyle's work, but he liked the idea of a future TV movie. In addition, there was an interesting juxtaposition of characters in the script Sherlock Holmes and Dr. Watson, which was supposed to attract the viewer and what, according to the director, previous film adaptations lacked.

Holmes is opposed to the official police system of Scotland Yard, because the main thing for him is to help, not just to punish. This, it seems to me, is the secret of the enduring love of readers and viewers for Sherlock Holmes, the living personification of loyalty and reliability — qualities that people have always needed so much. That was the reason why we were so willing to work on these films.

— Igor Maslennikov, Aurora, July 1985

Unlike some of their Western counterparts, the films are very close to the literary source. Some of the departures include Holmes' easy-going and humorous demeanor, as well as comic relief provided by some of the characters (most notably that of Sir Henry Baskerville and his butler Barrymore in The Hound of the Baskervilles episode).

Vasily Livanov and Vitaly Solomin met at the auditions, and they immediately formed friendly relations:

In relation to life, we coincided in many ways. Vitaly shared with me deeply personal experiences, and I think he did not share these experiences with anyone else… Love can be played on the screen. And friendship is impossible to play. You need to be friends.

— Vasily Livanov

A street in old Riga doubles as Baker Street (the same street was used for exterior locations of Tsvetochnaya street in "Seventeen Moments of Spring"). Many scenes were filmed in Saint Petersburg and Tallinn. "The role" of the Reichenbach Waterfall was "performed" by Circassian waterfall in Abkhazia.

== Regular cast ==
- Vasily Livanov as Sherlock Holmes
- Vitaly Solomin as Dr. Watson
- Rina Zelyonaya as Mrs. Hudson
- Borislav Brondukov as Inspector Lestrade
- Igor Dmitriev as Tobias Gregson
- Boris Klyuyev as Mycroft Holmes
- Viktor Yevgrafov as Professor Moriarty

== Soundtrack ==
The series' soundtrack was composed by Vladimir Dashkevich; the introductory piece has become one of the most recognizable pieces of cinematic music in the former Soviet Union. The tune intentionally resembles an hourly musical logo played on the shortwave BBC Russian Service (the Prince of Denmark's March), and Maslennikov later confirmed that he wanted a similar tune which could be identified with the spirit of the British Empire.

Official soundtrack was released in 1997 (CD) and in 2023 (LP).

== Reception ==
The films were positively received by the Soviet audience, noting the actors' masterful portrayal of the main characters and the production's attention to detail. The series became a cultural phenomenon and to this day remain a legendary masterpiece of Soviet television. Holmes and Watson, performed by Livanov and Solomin, became the heroes of jokes and the people's favorites, their sayings have become catch phrases. In 1982, for the Novy God's episode of "Little Blue Light" the interlude "Sherlock Holmes", written by Livanov, was played by Livanov and Solomin in modern costumes.

In the West, the reception of the series was warm, especially in the United Kingdom. British critics have pointed out that the creators of the series have treated the original source with due care and respect, and have successfully transferred the atmosphere of Sir Arthur Conan Doyle's works. In 2006, Vasily Livanov became an Honorary MBE (Member of the Order of the British Empire) — "For service to the theatre and performing arts". The British ambassador called Livanov one of the best actors who played Sherlock Holmes. Livanov's wax statue is displayed in the Sherlock Holmes Museum in London. In 2007, a statue to Sherlock Holmes and Dr. Watson, as played by Livanov and Solomin, was erected in Moscow near the British embassy.

== See also ==
- Sherlock Holmes – 2013 Russian TV series
- Sherlock in Russia – 2020 Russian TV series
