= Sportloto-82 =

- Directed by: Leonid Gaidai
- Written by: Leonid Gaidai; Vladlen Efimovich Bahnov (born 14.01.1924 - dead 26.10.2004)
- Starring: Algis Arlauskas; Svetlana Amanova; Mikhail Pugovkin; Mikhail Kokshenov; Nina Grebeshkova
- Music by: Aleksandr Zatsepin
- Production company: Mosfilm
- Release date: 1982
- Running time: 89 minutes
- Country: Soviet Union
- Language: Russian

Sportloto-82 (Russian: Спортлото-82) is a 1982 Soviet action adventure comedy film directed by Leonid Gaidai. The film stars Algis Arlauskas, Svetlana Amanova, Mikhail Pugovkin, Mikhail Kokshenov and Nina Grebeshkova. It was filmed in Soviet Union. It was also one of the all-time leaders at the Soviet box office with over 55,000,000 theatre admissions in the Soviet era.

== Plot ==
During hot summer in a compartment of a train en route to the city Yuzhnogorsk four passengers come into view. A young somewhat scatterbrained man Konstantin Lukow working as a driver for the police; Tatiana Pegova, a fetching young girl; San Sanych Murashko, an elderly imposing man, and Mikhail Golubev, a cheerful sprightly guy. All but Murashko have come to take a vacation in the south, at seaside. Murashko (who in reality is a petty crook and profiteer), together with his companion, hoodlum Stepa, transport oranges to Yuzhnogorosk to sell them on the market.

In the course of the trip, Kostya infatuated with Tatiana, offers her unexpected entertainment: to play the lottery "Sportloto". Tanya agrees and fills out the playslip and hides the ticket in a book belonging to Kostya. Tanya explains that she is too forgetful and the ticket will be much safer in Konstantin's care. However other companions are reading exactly the same book – the popular detective novel "Deadly Murder"! And therefore...

When they arrive in Yuzhnogorsk, everyone goes about their business. Tanya goes to a camp on the beach to be with her fiancé Pavel, and Kostya who came to visit his aunt Klava, is having the time of his life at the beach. Only Murashko and Stepa are in full "work mode", profiteering with oranges on the market. Soon, a newspaper publishes results of the lottery draw, and Kostya and Murashko (independently) learn the amazing news: Tanya has won 20 thousand rubles! Kostya immediately checks his book, but... the lottery ticket is not there! Moreover, Kostya sees that this book belongs to Murashko, as it is signed with his initials. He immediately sends out to search for Murashko and soon they find each other. The conman Murashko is delighted, he is certain that the precious ticket with him, but... in Murashko's book there is nothing either.

Kostya goes to the camp, where he meets with Tanya and tells her the good news. Tanya immediately checks her book, and... it is also empty. Murashko and Stepa who are quietly spying on Kostya and Tanya are disappointed. But now everything is clear: the ticket is in the book which is in the hands of Misha Golubev, the fourth companion. Golubev himself is on the alpine base "Eagle Shelter", and the one who first meets with Misha, becomes the owner of a huge payoff. Kostya, Tanya and her fiancé, Pavel, on one side, and the two rogues Murashko and Stepa, on the other side, rush to the mountains to hunt for the coveted ticket...

== Cast ==
- Algis Arlauskas as Kostya Lukow
- Svetlana Amanova as Tanya Pegova (singing voice by Ksenia Georgiadi)
- Mikhail Pugovkin as San Sanych Murashko
- Andrey Tolshin as Mikhail Golubev
- Mikhail Kokshenov as Stepa, Murashko's hodman
- Nina Grebeshkova as aunt Klava
- Denis Kmit as Pavel, Tanya's bridegroom
- Boryslav Brondukov as director of the tourist camp "Eagle shelter"
- Luiza Mosendz as Alla Dmitrievna, secretary (voice by Larisa Udovichenko)
- Sergey Filippov as station chief

== Filming ==
- Name of the writer "Genian Zelyoni", with whose detective novel the characters in the film are obsessed with, is a parody of the popular at the time among Soviet readers Yulian Semyonov, possibly contaminated with the popular sci-fi writer Kir Bulychev presented as "captain Zelyoni" in the animated movie The Mystery of the Third Planet. And even the title of the book - "Deadly Murder" is intentionally exaggerated.
- The leading lady Svetlana Amanova was a brunette so she had to periodically bleach her hair with hydrogen peroxide on the set.
- Among the candidates for the role of Pavel and Stepa was the very popular actor Mikhail Boyarsky, who eventually performed the opening song.
- For the role of the tourist camp director Mikhail Pugovkin was initially considered, but in the end the role was given to "master of the episodic role" - Borislav Brondukov and Pugovkin got the role of the main antagonist - "San Sanych".
- According to Louise Mosendz, a casting assistant met her in a hallway; she immediately took the girl to Gaidai who almost immediately confirmed Louise for the role of Alla Dmitrievna.
- The place where the shooting occurred is Crimea; railway station and the bazaar "Yuzhnogorsk-city" was filmed in Feodosia, and "camp of the motorists" - at Cape Kapchik. Tourist camp "Eagle Shelter" is the Kara Dag Mountain and the beach where Kostya is swimming and sunbathing is a beach town of Alushta. In the episode of San Sanych and Stepa with a boat the Cape Plaka is seen, and in the background Ayu-Dag is visible.
- The scene with the waterfall was shot in Abkhazia at the famous Gegsky waterfall. It is this waterfall which served as the "Reichenbach Falls", the place where Sherlock Holmes and Professor Moriarty clashed in a deadly battle in the famous film adaptation directed by Igor Maslennikov.
- The large rectangular stone, which bypasses San Sanych, and the tree from which the Fool (Yuri Nikulin) threw nuts (Gaidai's film Kidnapping, Caucasian Style) are located at a distance of several meters from each other.
- The "hot" summer day scene when Tanya (Svetlana Amanova character) performs the song "Earth bypasses Love" was shot under extreme cold, which caused Svetlana's lips to be visibly blue from the cold in the frame.

== Critical response ==
Based on 958 user votes, IMDb grades the movie at 6.9.
