= The Funeral Party (film) =

- Russian: Ниоткуда с любовью, или Весёлые похороны
- Directed by: Vladimir Fokin
- Written by: Grigory Ryazhsky; Lyudmila Ulitskaya
- Produced by: Alexander Buchman
- Starring: Aleksandr Abdulov; Anna Aleksakhina; Elena Rufanova; Polina Fokina; Anna Dvorzhetskaya
- Cinematography: Aleksandr Karyuk; Gennady Karyuk
- Edited by: Aleksey Denisko
- Music by: Vladimir Dashkevich
- Release date: 2007
- Country: Russia
- Language: Russian

The Funeral Party (Russian: Ниоткуда с любовью, или Весёлые похороны) is a 2007 Russian romantic drama film directed by Vladimir Fokin.

== Plot ==
The film takes place in New York in the 90s. The film tells about a talented artist who plays the performance of "life and death" in front of his friends and fans.

== Cast ==
- Aleksandr Abdulov as Alik
- Anna Aleksakhina as Nina
- Elena Rufanova as Irina Pearson
- Polina Fokina as Valentina
- Anna Dvorzhetskaya
- Vladimir Eryomin as Libin
- Vladimir Kachan as Fima Gruber
- Liya Akhedzhakova as Marya Ignatyevna
- Aleksey Kolgan as Father Viktor
- Yan Tsapnik as Rabbi Menashe
- Boris Klyuyev as Lyova Gottlieb
- Yevgeny Knyazev as the popular author
