= Natalya Bogomolova =

Russian animator (1940–2023)

Natalya Eduardovna Bogomolova (Russian: Наталия Эдуардовна Богомолова; 23 February 1940 – 6 December 2023) was a Russian animator, production designer and director.

Bogomolova's filmography includes more than 200 Soviet and Russian cartoons, including "The Blue Bird", "A Kitten Named Woof", "Vacation in Prostokvashino" and "Winnie the Pooh" and "Alice's Birthday".

Bogomolova died on 6 December 2023, at the age of 83.

== Awards ==
Bogomolova was awarded Merited Painter of the Russian Federation in 2012.
