= Yelena Safonova =

Soviet and Russian actress

- Елена Сафонова
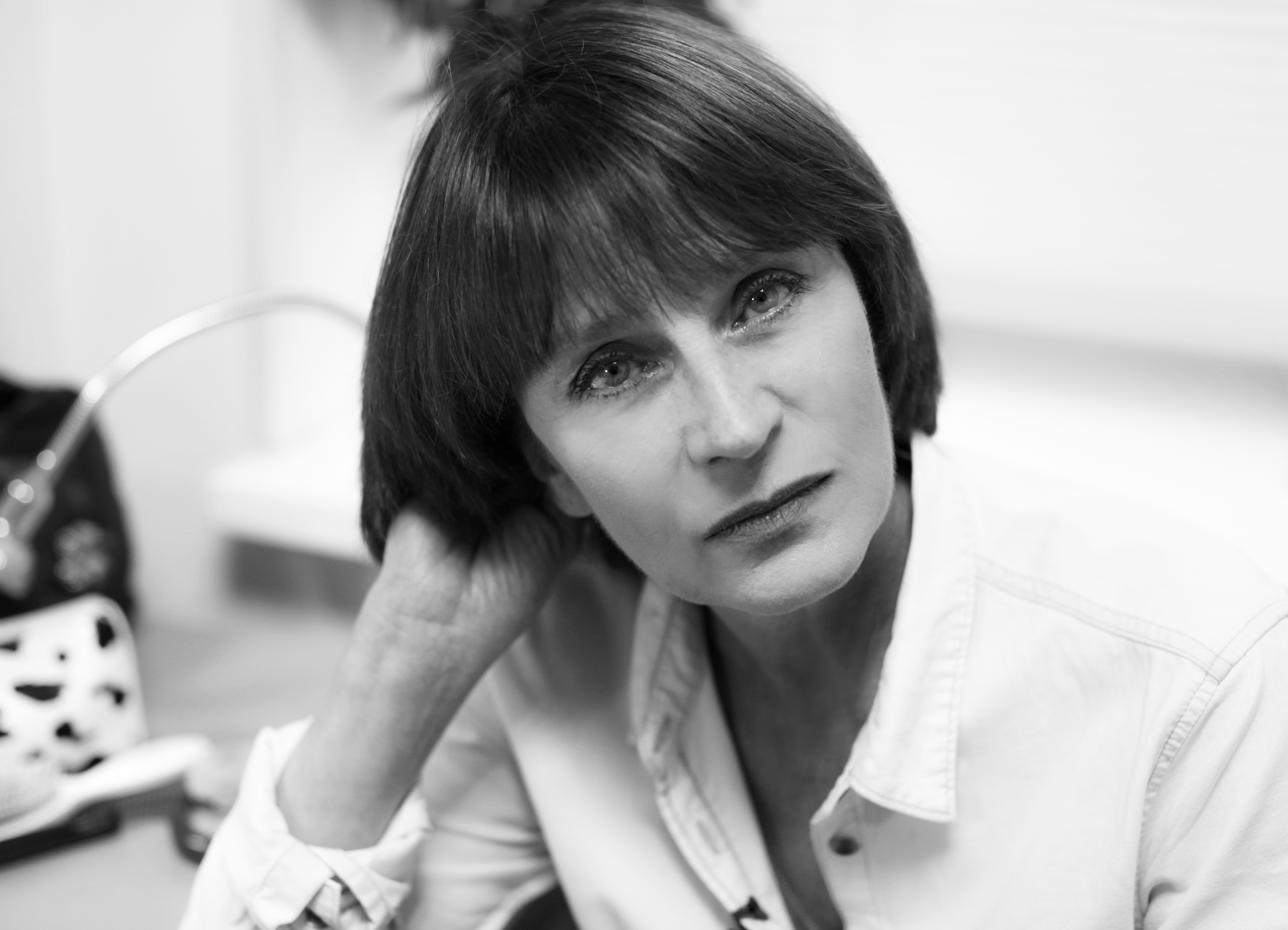
- 2015, by Mash Ka Art Cinema
- Born: Yelena Vsevolodovna Safonova; 14 June 1956 (age 70); Leningrad, RSFSR, USSR (now Saint Petersburg, Russia)
- Occupation: Actress
- Years active: 1974-Present
- Children: 2
- Awards: People's Artist of Russia

Yelena Vsevolodovna Safonova (Russian: Еле́на Все́володовна Сафо́нова; born 14 June 1956) is a former Soviet and Russian actress. She is an Honored Artist of Russia (2011). She was made famous by the 1985 melodrama Winter Cherry and its two sequels. In 1988, she was awarded the David di Donatello Italian film award for her starring turn in Nikita Mikhalkov's film Dark Eyes.

== Biography ==
=== Early life and education ===
Yelena Safonova was born on 14 June 1956 in Leningrad, the daughter of the famous Soviet actor Vsevolod Safonov and the film director Valeriya Ivanovna Rublyova who worked at Mosfilm.

In the mid-1960s, the family moved to Moscow, where Yelena attended a special secondary school and studied French to an advanced level.

In 1973, she graduated from Moscow Secondary School No. 37.

At her third attempt, she was accepted by the Gerasimov Institute of Cinematography to study acting. In between her entrance exams, she earned income as a librarian. After studying at the Film Institute for two years she returned to Leningrad, where she would graduate in 1981 from the Leningrad Institute of Theatre, Music and Cinematography (under Ruben Agamirzyan). In the same year she became an actress at the Komissarzhevskaya Theatre, where she worked for one season. She made her debut in cinema in 1974, in the role of Lyuba in the film Looking for my destiny.

=== Career ===
Safonova's first major film role was as Solomiya Krushelnytska in the biographical picture The Return of Butterfly (1983). Safonova became a household name in Russia with the role of the 30-year-old divorcee Olga in the romantic comedy Winter Cherry (1985) by Igor Maslennikov. She acted in another picture by the same director, The Twentieth Century Approaches, which was Maslennikov's last Sherlock Holmes adaptation.

Since 1986, the actress has worked with the Russian film studio Mosfilm. In 1987 Yelena starred opposite Marcello Mastroianni in the romantic drama Dark Eyes by director Nikita Mikhalkov. The film tells the story of a 19th-century married Italian who falls in love with a married Russian woman. For her performance she received the David di Donatello Prize in 1988.

In the 1990 drama Taxi Blues by Pavel Lungin Safonova played Nina, wife of a saxophone player. The film was about the connection between an alcoholic saxophonist and a hard-man taxi driver.

In 1999 Safonova portrayed a teacher who falls in love with a young acting student in Dmitry Meskhiyev's romantic drama Women's Property. Her screen partner was budding actor Konstantin Khabensky. In the same year she played in the thriller film The Admirer by Nikolay Lebedev.

Between 1992 and 1997 she worked in both France and Russia. Since 1997 she has resided in Moscow.

== Personal life ==
Yelena Safonova married for the first time at the age of twenty, to actor Vitaly Yushkov, whom she had met on the set of The Family of the Zatsepins (1977). Six years later the couple divorced.

In the late 1980s, Yelena was romantically involved with Vache Martirosyan, a businessman from the United States, who was married at that time. In 1991 Yelena gave birth to her son Ivan to whom she gave her own surname. Currently, Ivan works for Mosfilm.

She was married to fellow actor Samuel Labarthe between 1992 and 1997. Yelena had a second son, Aleksandr, from the marriage.

== Selected filmography ==
She starred in 87 films.

- 1974 Looking for my destiny (Ищу мою судьбу) as Lyuba
- 1982 The Return of Butterfly (Возвращение Баттерфляй) as Solomiya Krushelnytska
- 1982 The Voice (Голос) as Sveta
- 1985 Winter Cherry (Зимняя вишня) as Olga
- 1985 Sofiya Kovalevskaya (Софья Ковалевская) as Sofiya Kovalevskaya
- 1986 The Twentieth Century Approaches (Приключения Шерлока Холмса и доктора Ватсона: Двадцатый век начинается) as Lady Hilda Trelawney-Hope
- 1987 Dark Eyes (Очи чёрные) as Anna Sergeyevna, Governor's Wife
- 1988 Where is the Nophelet? (Где находится нофелет?) as Alla
- 1989 Katala (Катала) as Anna
- 1990 Taxi Blues (Такси-блюз) as Nina, Lyosha's Wife
- 1992 The Accompanist (Аккомпаниатор) as Irene Brice
- 1994 The Telegraph Road (La Piste du télégraphe) as Lisa Alling
- 1995 Music for December (Музыка для декабря) as Anna Bersyoneva
- 1999 The Admirer (Поклонник) as Aleksandra Mikhailovna
- 1999 Women's Property (Женская собственность) as Yelizaveta Kamenskaya
- 2000 Empire under Attack (Империя под ударом, TV) as Yelizaveta Fedorovna
- 2011 Svaty (Сваты, TV) as Eleonora Leonidovna
- 2022 Terrible Dad (Грозный папа) as Martha
