= The Queen of Spades (1982 film) =

- Directed by: Igor Maslennikov
- Written by: Alexander Pushkin; Aleksandr Shlepyanov
- Starring: Viktor Proskurin; Innokenty Smoktunovsky
- Narrated by: Alla Demidova
- Cinematography: Yuri Veksler
- Music by: Dmytro Bortniansky
- Distributed by: Lenfilm
- Release date: 1982
- Running time: 92 minutes
- Country: Soviet Union
- Language: Russian

The Queen of Spades (Russian: «Пиковая дама», romanized: Pikovaya dama) is a 1982 film adaptation of the 1834 Alexander Pushkin short story of the same name.

Film is verbatim (including epigraphs) screening of Pushkin's story.

== Plot ==
In fact, it retains virtually all of the original text of the story. Maslennikov does everything possible to create a “realistic” version of the tale, using costumes which accurately reflect the period, filming exclusively in Sankt-Petersburg, and even limiting his soundtrack to period music (compositions of Dmitry Bortniansky). Even the epigraphs at the beginning of each brief chapter are printed on the screen.

To hold to Pushkin's text, a narrator (played by Alla Demidova) appears in the streets and salons of St. Petersburg, convincingly telling the story in Pushkin's words. She begins narrating as she opens the door to the dining room of Narumov (played by Konstantin Grigoriev), where several aristocratic guards officers have been playing cards all night. Their game is observed by Hermann/Germann (played by Viktor Proskurin), an officer of the corps of engineers (and thus not of the high aristocratic class of the other officers). He seems fascinated by the card game, and is very attentive to the conversations of the guards officers. Germann is an ethnic German, and seems to fit the Russian stereotype of a thrifty German: he does not gamble because he is not willing to risk losing “that which is necessary to gain that which is superfluous.”

As the night is coming to an end, one of the officers, Count Pavel (“Paul”) Tomsky (played by Vitaly Solomin) tells a story from the youth of his now aged grandmother, who once gained a huge gambling debt in France, and supposedly approached the mysterious Count Saint-Germain for help. Tomsky goes on to state that the Count gave her a winning card combination, and she won back enough to pay off her gambling debt. Tomsky further states that his grandmother, now in her eighties, refuses to share the secret with anyone in his family. Tomsky gets a bit carried away with his story, saying that Cardinal Richelieu had been madly in love with his grandmother. The famous Cardinal Richelieu (1585-1642) was before his grandmother's time, so we can only assume he was referring to the less celebrated Louis-François-Armand du Pless Richelieu (1696-1788), a French marshal and grand-nephew to the renowned Cardinal and statesman. Also, the mention of Count Saint Germain (1710-1784), a mysterious character associated with the occult, makes the story seem a bit fantastic, and the other officers may have taken note of this, but Germann takes the story quite literally.

The elderly countess Anna Fedotovna (played by Elena Gogoleva) is attended by a young companion (a “ward,” probably an impoverished distant relative) called Lizaveta Ivanovna (played by Irina Dymchenko), and Germann begins to seek a way to initiate a romance with Lizaveta in order to gain access to the elderly countess and her secret.

After negligently causing the death of the countess, Germann is visited by her ghost, who tells him the secret of the 3 cards. Germann is now confidant that he can use the secret to win a fortune. He uses his contacts among the guards officers to gain entrance to the elite card game of Chekalinsky (played by Innokenty Smoktonovsky), where he risks his modest fortune in an attempt to gain fantastic wealth.

The German stereotype has been turned inside out - Germann has gone from being sober, hard-working and thrifty to being obsessed with gaining a quick and easy fortune, and this proves to be his undoing.

== Cast ==
- Alla Demidova as the narrator
- Viktor Proskurin as Herman
- Irina Dymchenko as Lisa
- Elena Gogoleva as Countess
- Vitaly Solomin as Count Tomsky
- Innokenty Smoktunovsky as Chekalinsky

== Commentary ==
Igor Maslennikov said about the film:

- "Queen of Spades" came out in me absolutely by such as I wanted her to see - not only as the motion picture director, but as men with the classical philological education. We brought to the consciousness of a spectator the authentic, true text of this piece of Pushkin, and indeed many receive "Queen of Spades" using the material of Tchaikovsky's opera. There is even guide on Petersburg, in which under the photograph of winter groove stands the signature: "the winter groove, in which was drowned Pushkin's Liza". Here immediately several errors. It suffices to say that anywhere Pushkin does not have any Liza, but Lizaveta Ivanovna, who safely marry... And here these myths we attempted to destroy...".
- "... most important myth - about Hermann, who by Pushkin not was neither demonic nor romantic hero. This is such kind of nemchik (Note: "nemchik" is a derogatory form for nemets, "German person"), which in Petersburg there was much - 30% of population. Pushkin irritated all of them, to Hermann he gave the pejorative characteristic: no one of the officers perceived nonsense about the three cards, the very same to this believed; passing by the house of the countess, he saw her niece and began to letter her. But not his own, but he copied pages from the German novels."
