= Oleksiy-Nestor Naumenko =

Ukrainian filmmaker

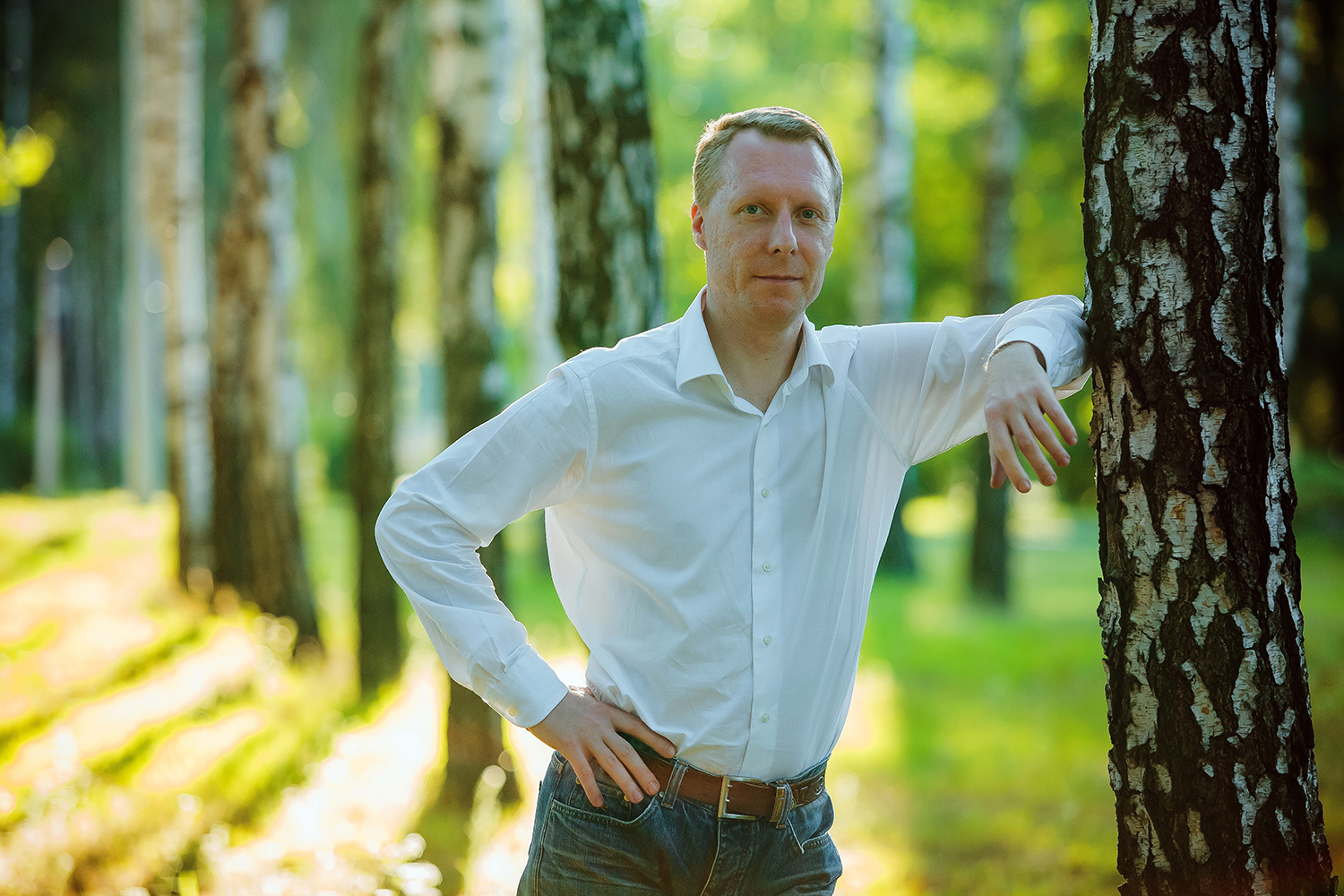
- Born: Oleksii Serhiyovych Naumenko; March 11, 1973 (age 53); Kyiv, Ukraine
- Other name: Oleksiy-Nestor Naumenko
- Education: Ivan Karpenko-Karyi Kyiv National University of Theatre, Cinema and Television (1995–2000); Kyiv Polytechnic Institute (1990–1996)
- Occupations: Film director, screenwriter, cinematographer, producer, publicist
- Years active: 1997–present
- Organization: National Filmmakers’ Union of Ukraine (since 2001)
- Website: Nestor Film

Oleksiy-Nestor Naumenko (Ukrainian: Олексій-Нестор Науменко, born 11 March 1973) is a Ukrainian film director, screenwriter, cinematographer, and producer. He works primarily in experimental filmmaking, documentary, and visual arts. Naumenko is also a traveller and a publicist, writing on cultural, social, ethnographic, and cinematic subjects.

== Biography and career ==
Oleksiy Naumenko was born in Kyiv, Ukraine. After completing his technical education as a television engineer at the Kyiv Polytechnic Institute, he continued his studies at the Ivan Karpenko-Karyi Kyiv National University of Theatre, Cinema and Television, graduating in 2000 with a degree in film and television directing.

Naumenko began his professional career in the mid-1990s as an assistant director and video editor for Ukrainian television. He later transitioned to independent filmmaking, working across a variety of genres and formats. His films explore themes including social inequality, ecology, cultural heritage preservation, and the psychological dimensions of human experience.

His body of work includes more than 50 films ranging from documentary, chronicle, ethnographic and music films to short fiction, experimental works, photo films, and arthouse. He creates films in several languages, including Ukrainian, English, and Spanish.

Among Naumenko's experimental films is 50 Horizons (2023), a full-length documentary exploring minimalist and absurdist aesthetics. The film was presented at the Molodist International Film Festival and is described as being inspired by the creative methods of James Joyce and James Benning. Other projects include the travel essay films Year of Volcanoes (2018), Sunny Island (2021), Caribbean Trilogy (2020), a documentary essay about Japan The Butterfly Way (2014), and a series titled Nestor's Travel ABC, which began in 2022.

Naumenko has filmed in locations across the globe. Year of Volcanoes was shot on four European volcanoes: Vesuvius and Etna (Italy), Teide (Spain), and Santorini (Greece). Caribbean Trilogy, which includes Walls of Santo Domingo, Flower in the Mist and 47, was filmed in Cuba and the Dominican Republic. Sunny Island was filmed in 11 countries on four continents. 50 Horizons includes footage from 21 countries, such as Ukraine, Panama, Japan, Iceland, Egypt, Germany, Switzerland, Montenegro, Norway, Sri Lanka, the Maldives, etc.

Most of Naumenko's films have been produced through his independent studio Nestor Film.

In addition to filmmaking, Naumenko is a photographer and a curator of art exhibitions and performative projects.

As a publicist, Oleksiy-Nestor Naumenko collaborates with various media outlets, including cinema journals. He is recognized for his research on the life and work of film director Andrei Tarkovsky, and Ukrainian actors Boryslav Brondukov and Ivan Mykolaichuk.

== Full filmography of Oleksiy-Nestor Naumenko ==
| № | Title | Year | Genre | Length (min) | Participation | Notes |
|---|---|---|---|---|---|---|
| 1 | Reconstruction of Consciousness (Реконструкція свідомості) | 1997 | portrait documentary | 46 | director screenwriter cinematographer producer | student film about painter Hlib Vysheslavskyi |
| 2 | Rose of Paracelsus (Троянда Парацельса) | 1998 | short fiction, adaptation | 17 | director screenwriter producer | student film based on the novel by Jorge Luis Borges; starring Bogdan Kamburov, Arkadiy Nepytaliuk; cinematographer Andriy Klymenko |
| 3 | Far Native Land (Далека рідна земля) | 1998 | ethnographic documentary | 33 | director co-screenwriter | about Ukrainian Australians |
| 4 | Melody! (Мелодія!) | 1999 | portrait and music documentary | 37 | director screenwriter producer | student film about avant-garde composer Vitaliy Hodziatsky; cinematographer Dmytro Tiazhlov |
| 5 | Hope of Souls (Прагнення душ) | 1999 | fiction, arthouse | 21 | director screenwriter cinematographer producer | student film; starring Svitlana Shtanko, Oleksiy Naumenko, Anatoliy Dyachenko, Hanna Silenko; cameraman Arkadiy Nepytaliuk |
| 6 | The Elements (Стихія) | 2000 | portrait documentary | 30 | director cinematographer co-producer | student film; script by Hanna Yarovenko; filmed in Crimea (Ukraine) |
| 7 | Parts of Existence (Частки буття) | 2000 | portrait documentary | 31 | director screenwriter cinematographer co-producer | about a school teacher from Ukrainian province |
| 8 | Man on the Hill (Людина на пагорбі) | 2007 | fiction-documentary, arthouse | 33 | director screenwriter cinematographer producer | starring Natalia Morozova, Andriy Kulagin |
| 9 | Praise Winter after St. Mykola's! (Хвали зиму після Миколи!) | 2008 | ethnographic documentary | 12 | director screenwriter cinematographer co-producer | filmed in the estate of Saint Nicholas in Ivano-Frankivsk region (Ukraine) |
| 10 | The Way Ukrainians Live in Siberia (Як українці в Сибіру живуть) | 2008 | ethnographic documentary | 85 | director screenwriter cinematographer co-producer | filmed in Southwestern Siberia; co-producer Askold Lozynskyj |
| 11 | Certainly, the Sun Will Come (Сонце неодмінно прийде) | 2009 | visual documentary | 11 | director screenwriter cinematographer producer | filmed in Crimea (Ukraine) |
| 12 | Approach of Kamchatka (Наближення Камчатки) | 2009 | music documentary | 36 | director screenwriter cinematographer producer | songs by Oleg Bochko in the author's performance; filmed in Kyiv and Saint Petersburg |
| 13 | Outside the Circle (За межами кола) | 2010 | portrait documentary | 50 | director screenwriter cinematographer co-producer | about the fate of the artist in the modern world; filmed in Kyiv and Cherkasy region (Ukraine) |
| 14 | Maidan-On-The-Blood (Майдан-на-крові) | 2014 | chronicle-documentary | 36 | director screenwriter co-producer | about the Revolution of Dignity in Kyiv; in cooperation with NTN TV channel |
| 15 | The Butterfly Way (Шлях метелика) | 2014 | arthouse documentary | 48 | director screenwriter cinematographer co-producer | filmed in Japan; co-producer Takeshi Hirata |
| 16 | Visitors to Paradise (Відвідувачі раю) | 2015 | visual documentary | 77 | director screenwriter cinematographer producer | filmed in the Maldives |
| 17 | Three Capitals: Sarajevo, the Stumbling City (Три столиці: Сараєво – місто спотикання) | 2015 | documentary | 15 | director screenwriter cinematographer producer | filmed in Bosnia and Herzegovina |
| 18 | Three Capitals. Tokyo: The Capital of Contraries (Три столиці: Токіо – столиця протилежностей) | 2015 | documentary | 16 | director screenwriter cinematographer producer | filmed in Japan |
| 19 | Ohrid Lake (Озеро Охрид) | 2016 | visual documentary | 12 | director screenwriter cinematographer producer | filmed in North Macedonia |
| 20 | The Kyiv Episodes (Київські епізоди) | 2016 | conceptual documentary | 76 | director screenwriter cinematographer producer | filmed in Kyiv (Ukraine) |
| 21 | Shit (Херня) | 2016 | short fiction, comedy | 9 | director cinematographer | screenplay by Oleg Romanenko; starring Tetyana Nyankina, Andriy Gubin; filmed in Sumy (Ukraine) |
| 22 | 44 | 2018 | documentary essay, autobiographical | 12 | director screenwriter cinematographer producer composer | filmed in the Meteora mountains in Greece |
| 23 | Beer Day (День пива) | 2018 | documentary | 7 | director screenwriter cinematographer producer | filmed in Munich (Germany) during Oktoberfest |
| 24 | Three Capitals: Malé, the Smallest Capital in the World (Три столиці: Малє – найменша столиця світу) | 2018 | documentary | 16 | director screenwriter cinematographer producer | filmed in the Maldives |
| 25 | Year of Volcanoes (Рік вулканів) | 2018 | documentary essay | 30 | director screenwriter cinematographer producer composer | filmed on the volcanoes Vesuvius and Mount Etna (Italy), Teide (Spain), and Santorini (Greece) |
| 26 | Dentist's Cabinet (Кабінет стоматолога) | 2019 | short fiction, sketch, satire | 3 | director screenwriter | cinematographer Mykhailo Lebedev; starring Igor Khalizov, Kateryna Ozirna, Olena Salomatina |
| 27 | Å: Silence of Cod (О: Мовчання тріски) | 2020 | visual documentary | 8 | director screenwriter cinematographer producer | filmed in Lofoten Islands (Norway) |
| 28 | Flower in the Mist (Квітка в тумані) | 2020 | documentary essay | 19 | director screenwriter cinematographer producer | filmed in Cuba |
| 29 | 47 | 2020 | documentary essay, ecological, autobiographical | 15 | director screenwriter cinematographer producer | filmed in the Dominican Republic, Cuba, Panama, the Canary Islands, Sri Lanka, the Maldives, Japan |
| 30 | Walls of Santo Domingo (Стіни Санто-Домінго) | 2020 | conceptual documentary | 10 | director screenwriter cinematographer producer | filmed in the Dominican Republic |
| 31 | Sunny Island (Сонячний острів) | 2021 | documentary essay | 69 | director screenwriter cinematographer producer | music by Max Lymar; filmed in 11 countries between 2012 and 2020 |
| 32 | Vienna, the Music Capital of the World (Відень – музична столиця світу) | 2021 | documentary | 30 | director screenwriter cinematographer producer | filmed in Austria |
| 33 | Nestor's Travel ABC. Rovaniemi: Visiting the Christmas Goat (Мандрівна абетка Нестора. Рованіємі: У гості до Різдвяного Козла) | 2022 | documentary | 6 | director screenwriter cinematographer producer | music by Max Lymar; filmed at Joulupukki Estate in Finland |
| 34 | Nestor's Travel ABC. Å: For What the Cod Whist (Мандрівна абетка Нестора. О: Про що мовчить тріска) | 2022 | documentary essay | 5 | director screenwriter cinematographer producer | music by Max Lymar; filmed in Lofoten Islands (Norway) |
| 35 | Roads of Armenia. Books of Haghpat (Дороги Вірменії. Книги Ахпата) | 2022 | documentary | 5 | director screenwriter cinematographer producer | filmed in Armenia |
| 36 | Time to Gather Stones (Tiempo de juntar piedras) | 2022 | portrait documentary | 34 | director screenwriter cinematographer co-producer | filmed in Catalonia (Spain); in Spanish |
| 37 | Nestor's Travel ABC. Venice: Life vs. death (Мандрівна абетка Нестора. Венеція: Життя проти смерті) | 2022 | documentary | 6 | director screenwriter cinematographer producer | music by Max Lymar; filmed in Italy |
| 38 | Nestor's Travel ABC. Barcelona: Dreams of Reinforced Concrete (Мандрівна абетка Нестора. Барселона: Мрії залізобетону) | 2022 | documentary essay | 12 | director screenwriter cinematographer producer | music by Max Lymar; filmed in Spain |
| 39 | 50 Horizons (50 горизонтів) | 2023 | conceptual documentary, avant-garde | 77 | director screenwriter cinematographer producer | the third part of an autobiographical tetralogy |
| 40 | 50 Waters (50 вод) | 2023 | conceptual documentary | 77 | director screenwriter cinematographer producer | the first part of an autobiographical tetralogy |
| 41 | 50 Roads (50 доріг) | 2023 | conceptual documentary | 77 | director screenwriter cinematographer producer | the second part of an autobiographical tetralogy |
| 42 | Landscape of Oblivion (Paysage de l'oubli) | 2023 | experimental documentary, avant-garde | 39 | director cinematographer producer | filmed in Chornobyl (Ukraine) and on the Atlantic Coast (Iceland, Spain, Dominican Republic); in French |
| 43 | Immortal Hamlet | 2023 | fiction-documentary | 21 | director screenwriter cinematographer producer | staging of a play by William Shakespeare; filmed at Kronborg Castle (Denmark); music by Max Lymar; in English |
| 44 | Roads of Armenia. Prisoner of Khor Virap (Дороги Вірменії. В’язень Хор-Вірапа) | 2023 | documentary | 11 | director screenwriter cinematographer producer | filmed in Armenia |
| 45 | Nestor's Travel ABC. Washington: Blooming days (Мандрівна абетка Нестора. Вашингтон: Квітучі дні) | 2023 | documentary essay | 7 | director screenwriter cinematographer producer | music by Max Lymar; filmed in the US |
| 46 | Nestor's Travel ABC. Florence: A Numb City (Мандрівна абетка Нестора. Флоренція: Заціпеніле місто) | 2023 | documentary photo film, essay | 8 | director screenwriter cinematographer producer | music by Max Lymar; filmed in Italy |
| 47 | Nestor's Travel ABC. Jerusalem: Triumph of walls (Мандрівна абетка Нестора. Єрусалим: Тріумф стін) | 2023 | documentary essay | 11 | director screenwriter cinematographer producer | music by Max Lymar; filmed in Israel |
| 48 | Nestor's Travel ABC. Paris: Birds of Love (Мандрівна абетка Нестора. Париж: Птахи кохання) | 2023 | documentary essay | 11 | director screenwriter cinematographer producer | music by Max Lymar; filmed in France |
| 49 | Time of Scattered Stones (Час розкиданого каміння) | 2024 | photo film, experimental | 10 | director screenwriter cinematographer producer | filmed in Kamianets-Podilskyi (Ukraine) |
| 50 | 50 Meetings (50 зустрічей) | 2024 | conceptual documentary, autobiographical | 203 | director screenwriter cinematographer producer | the fourth part of an autobiographical tetralogy |
| 51 | Nestor's Travel ABC. Kamakura: Drops of the Truth (Мандрівна абетка Нестора. Камакура: Краплини істини) | 2024 | documentary essay | 10 | director screenwriter cinematographer producer | music by Max Lymar; filmed in Japan |
| 52 | Nestor's Travel ABC. Oyama: Brawlers in the Shrine (Мандрівна абетка Нестора. Ояма: Бешкетники в храмі) | 2024 | ethnographic documentary | 9 | director screenwriter cinematographer producer | music by Max Lymar; filmed in Japan |
| 53 | The Turbulent Sea of Our Life (Бурхливе море нашого життя) | 2024 | documentary | 28 | director screenwriter cinematographer producer | based on the exhibition of paintings by Mykola Kosciuszko; cinematographer Andriy Klymenko |
| 54 | Rendezvous with Maksym Rylsky (Побачення з Максимом Рильським) | 2025 | chronicle-documentary | 37 | director literary editor sound designer | about the famous Ukrainian poet Maksym Rylsky; scriptwriter Maksym Rylsky-junior |
| 55 | Nestor’s Travel ABC. Munich: Oktoberfest (Мандрівна абетка Нестора. Мюнхен: Октоберфест) | 2026 | ethnographic documentary | 6 | director screenwriter cinematographer producer | music by Max Lymar; filmed in Germany |
| 56 | Chornobyl. Stolen Bodies (Чорнобиль. Украдені тіла) | 2026 | experimental documentary | 28 | director screenwriter cinematographer producer | filmed in Ukraine and Iceland |
