= Dead Season =

Dead Season (Мёртвый сезон)
- Directed by: Savva Kulish
- Written by: Aleksandr Shlepyanov; Vladimir Vajnshtok
- Starring: Donatas Banionis; Rolan Bykov; Sergei Kurilov
- Cinematography: Aleksandr Chechulin
- Music by: Andrei Volkonsky
- Production company: Lenfilm
- Release date: 20 December 1968
- Running time: 138 minutes
- Country: Soviet Union
- Language: Russian

Dead Season (Russian: Мёртвый сезон, translit. Myortvyy sezon) is a 1968 Soviet spy film directed by Savva Kulish based on a screenplay by Aleksandr Shlepyanov and Vladimir Vajnshtok and featuring Donatas Banionis and Rolan Bykov.

== Plot ==
A connection between Dr. Hass and the West German intelligence was killed at an airport in one of the European countries. Encryption was discovered in the pocket of the murdered person for the purchase of raw material for mass production of RH gas.

The possibilities of gas are such that in small doses it stimulates the intellectual potential of a person, in large ones it turns them into a joyous idiot and a laborer-robot. The case of Hass is handled by the Soviet intelligence colonel Konstantin Ladeynikov. The main difficulty is that Ladeynikov has fallen into the sight of the intelligence services, but the intelligence officer asks for permission from his leadership to stay in the country and continue work.

However, Ladeynikov has no portrait of Hass so he needs a person who can identify him. The KGB leadership appeals to the actor of the children's theater, the father of two children, Ivan Savushkin, with a request to draw a portrait of Hass. In 1944, Savushkin fled from a Nazi concentration camp, where Hass conducted his fatal experiments, turning people into meaningless animals. Over time, Savushkin understands how much he depends on him in the operation with Hass and agrees to go to help Ladeynikov. In addition, he knows German well.

== Cast ==
- Donatas Banionis as Ladeynikov / Lonsfield (voiced by Alexander Demyanenko)
- Rolan Bykov as Savushkin
- Gennadi Yukhtin as Muravyov
- Bruno Freindlich as Valery Petrovich
- Svetlana Korkoshko as Ellis
- Jüri Järvet as Professor O'Reilly
- Laimonas Noreika as Nicholls
- Stepan Krylov as former prisoner of concentration camp
- Ants Eskola as Smith
- Leonhard Merzin as Father Mortimer
- Einari Koppel as Drayton
- Mauri Raus as Greban
- Vladimir Erenberg as Professor Born / Hass
- Anda Zaice as Catrine

== Trivia ==
- Film features a scene of exchange of the spies on the Glienicke Bridge.
- Vladimir Putin once stated that Banionis' part in the film was the reason why he joined the KGB.
