= Most, Most, Most, Most =

- Video cover
- Directed by: Vasily Livanov
- Cinematography: Mikhail Druyan
- Music by: Gennady Gladkov
- Production company: Soyuzmultfilm
- Release date: 1966
- Running time: 16 minutes
- Country: Soviet Union
- Language: Russian

Most, Most, Most, Most (Russian: Самый, самый, самый, самый, romanized: Samiy, samiy, samiy, samiy) is a 1966 animated film by Soyuzmultfilm directed by Vasily Livanov.

== Plot ==
This legend was told by the Ancient Spirit, who hid himself at the bottom of a dried-up well in the very middle of Africa. On the shores of Lake Chad many different birds and animals have settled. Once upon a time they decided to elect a king and chose Lion. They called him the bravest, the strongest, the wisest and the most beautiful. Then a son was born to the Leo and the Lioness — Little Lion. When the Little Lion became able to walk alone, he met a hyena who told Little Lion that he is a Lion, hence the king of beasts, which means he was the bravest, the strongest, the wisest, the most beautiful.

Little Lion matured, began to move farther from home and came across a well with the Ancient Spirit. Little Lion boasted that he was the bravest, the strongest, the wisest, the most beautiful! The Ancient Spirit laughed and said: "You are the most stupid!" Then Little Lion was bitten by an ant who was not afraid of anyone, because he defended his anthill. Little Lion said: "You are indeed more brave than me, but I am the strongest!" The Ant laughed, called Little Lion the most stupid and advised him to find the Bald Elephant.

And the Little Lion went to look for the Bald Elephant. And when he saw how a huge elephant easily rips out a tree by the root, he realized who is the strongest! The eagle said: "Listen and remember! Do not say that you are brave - you will meet someone braver! Do not say that you are strong — you will meet a stronger one! Do not say that you are wise — you will meet someone more wise!" "I understand, — answered the Little Lion, — But who is the most beautiful? "The eagle flew away without listening.

Some time has passed, the young Lion called the beasts and birds using his roar, and announced that he would tear apart those who would call him the bravest, the strongest, the wisest and the most beautiful. Lion was approached by the young Lioness who said: "I fell in love with you at first sight. You can tear me apart, but I'll still say it! You are the most beautiful!" The lion smiled at her with a shy smile, because he realized that the one who is loved, is always the most, most, most, most...

== Cast ==
- Rina Zelyonaya — Little Lion
- Valentina Sperantova — Adolescent Lion
- Ivan Tarkhanov — Young Lion
- Elena Ponsova — Hyena
- Vladimir Koretsky — The Ancient Spirit
- Klara Rumyanova — The Crocodile / The Ant
- Vladimir Balashov — Eagle
- Valentina Tumanova — Dove
- Lyubov Zemlyanikina — Lioness
- Alexander Baranov — Little Lion's Father
- Vasily Livanov — The Crocodile
