= Dark Eyes (1987 film) =

- Film poster
- Directed by: Nikita Mikhalkov
- Written by: Alexander Adabashyan; Nikita Mikhalkov; Suso Cecchi d'Amico; Anton Chekhov (stories)
- Produced by: Carlo Cucchi; Silvia D'Amico Bendico
- Starring: Marcello Mastroianni; Silvana Mangano; Marthe Keller; Yelena Safonova; Pina Cei; Vsevolod Larionov; Innokenti Smoktunovsky
- Cinematography: Franco Di Giacomo
- Edited by: Enzo Meniconi
- Music by: Francis Lai
- Distributed by: RUSCICO
- Release date: 9 September 1987
- Running time: 118 minutes
- Countries: Italy; Soviet Union
- Language: Italian / Russian / French

Dark Eyes (Italian: Oci ciornie [ˈɔːtʃi ˈtʃɔrnje]; a transcription of Russian: Очи чёрные [ˈotɕɪ ˈtɕɵrnɨjɪ]) is a 1987 Italian and Soviet romantic comedy-drama film directed by Nikita Mikhalkov. Set in Italy and Russia in the years before the First World War, it tells the story of a married Italian man who falls in love with a married Russian woman. Starring Marcello Mastroianni and Yelena Safonova, it received positive reviews from critics. The title of the film refers to a popular Russian song of the same name written by Yevhen Hrebinka in 1843.

== Plot ==
Romano is sitting at a table in the empty restaurant aboard an Italian ship, having a drink. When Pavel, a middle-aged Russian on his honeymoon cruise, enters the room, the two men strike up a conversation. Romano mentions that he once travelled to Russia because of a woman, and an intrigued Pavel asks to hear his story.

Born from a poor family, Romano graduated as an architect but he never had a chance to practice his profession following his marriage to a very wealthy woman called Elisa, who is busy running a bank she has just inherited. With little to do, Romano takes a solitary holiday at an expensive spa. There he meets Anna, a Russian woman vacationing on her own, who tells him about her poor background and her marriage to a rich man for security. After one night together, Anna leaves Romano a farewell letter and travels back to Russia.

Having decided that he wants to spend his life with her, Romano, on pretence of exploring business opportunities, travells to Russia to Anna's remote town. While Anna's husband is busy hosting a reception for a distinguished foreign guest, Romano follows Anna around and manages to secretly meet with her in an henhouse. Romano promises that if she will wait for him, he will travel to Italy and separate from his wife.

Once back to Italy, he discovers that his Elisa's bank had collapsed and bailiffs have put her palatial house up for sale. Elisa welcomes Romano holding the letter he has received from Anna, and asks him if he has a lover in Russia. Romano denies it, and the two somehow reconcile. Later Elisa unexpectedly inherits a legacy and as such the couple is able to resume their opulent lifestyle.

After hearing Romano's story, Pavel mentions that his wife too has left a very unhappy marriage and how it took him a long time to persuade her to remarry. The conversation is abruptly interrupted by the ship's cook, who comes in and tells Romano to start laying the tables for lunch. Pavel, having realized that Romano is employed on the ship, excuses himself and goes to look for his wife, who turns out to be Anna.

== Production ==
The film was inspired by four of Anton Chekhov's stories, most notably The Lady with the Dog. It was adapted by a Soviet-Italian team that included Alexander Adabashyan, Suso Cecchi d'Amico and Nikita Mikhalkov, who also directed the film. Mastroianni's voice was dubbed by Mikhalkov himself for the Russian edition. This was the last film of Silvana Mangano.

== Cast ==
- Marcello Mastroianni as Romano Patroni
- Silvana Mangano as Elisa, Romano's wife
- Marthe Keller as Tina, Romano's mistress
- Isabella Rossellini as Claudia, Romano's daughter
- Pina Cei as Elisa's mother
- Yelena Safonova as Anna Sergeyevna, the Governor's wife
- Innokenti Smoktunovsky as the Governor of Sysoyev
- Vsevolod Larionov as Pavel Alekseev

== Location ==
Principal photography took place in Montecatini Terme in Tuscany, and in the Volga town of Kostroma. Some scenes were shot in the Vladimir Palace, Peter and Paul Fortress in Leningrad.

== Reception ==
=== Critical response ===
Dark Eyes has an approval rating of 89% on review aggregator website Rotten Tomatoes, based on 9 reviews, and an average rating of 7.84/10.

=== Awards ===
Mastroianni received the award for Best Actor at the 1987 Cannes Film Festival and was nominated for the Academy Award for Best Actor. Safonova was awarded the David di Donatello as Best Actress. Costume Designer Carlo Diappi was awarded the Ciak d'oro.

== See also ==
- 1987 in film
