= The Foundling (1940 film) =

- Directed by: Tatyana Lukashevich
- Written by: Rina Zelyonaya; Agniya Barto
- Starring: Veronika Lebedeva; Faina Ranevskaya; Rostislav Plyatt
- Cinematography: Semyon Scheinin
- Edited by: Klaudia Moskvina
- Music by: Nikolai Kryukov
- Distributed by: Mosfilm
- Release date: January 27, 1940
- Running time: 76 minutes
- Country: USSR
- Language: Russian

The Foundling (Russian: Подкидыш, romanized: Podkidysh) is a 1940 comedy drama directed by Tatyana Lukashevich. The film was a production of Mosfilm based on the script by Rina Zelyonaya and Agniya Barto and was released on 27 January 1940. It was one of the first Russian family films. Originally in black and white, it was reproduced in colour in 2010.

The film centers around a curious five-year-old girl who embarks on a series of misadventures across Moscow after wandering away from home, leading a diverse group of people to search for her.

== Plot ==
The film centers on a five-year-old girl, Natasha (Veronika Lebedeva), who is left in the care of her older brother, Yura, while their mother (Olga Zhizneva) goes to the countryside to rent a summer house for the family. Yura, expecting friends over, half-jokingly promises Natasha that he will "tear her head off" if she doesn't sleep until the housemaid, Arisha (Rina Zelyonaya), arrives. While the pioneers discuss social matters in the next room, Natasha sneaks out for her first independent walk around the city. Throughout the day, Natasha finds herself in a series of adventures. She first ends up in a kindergarten, where a caregiver unsuccessfully tries to discover the girl's last name and address. Next, Natasha finds herself at the apartment of a childless geologist, Yevgeny Semyonovich (Rostislav Plyatt), who, believing she was abandoned, gets into a dispute with his neighbor (Tatyana Barysheva), who claims the girl as her own. While the neighbors argue, Natasha, chasing a cat, vanishes from the apartment.

Her journey continues, and soon the childless couple Lya (Faina Ranevskaya) and Muli (Pyotr Repnin) decide they want to adopt Natasha after she narrowly escapes being run over by a car. Despite some initial reservations from her husband, Lya reassures him by asking Natasha, "Tell me, little one, what do you want—your head torn off, or to go to the summer house?" However, Natasha never reaches the summer house, as she gets mixed up with a crowd of football fans at the train station and ends up handing flowers to the athletes.

As Natasha roams through Moscow, various people—including Yura, his classmate Nina, and a missing persons investigator named Sergeev (Ivan Lobyzovsky)—search for her. By the end of the day, Sergeev brings Natasha back home. Lying in her crib, Natasha announces to her brother, "Yura, I’m already found!" In the film's closing scene, their mother sings Natasha a lullaby while holding her in her arms: "In our joyful land, / They love my little girl." Sleepily, Natasha suggests, "Mama, let's get lost together tomorrow."

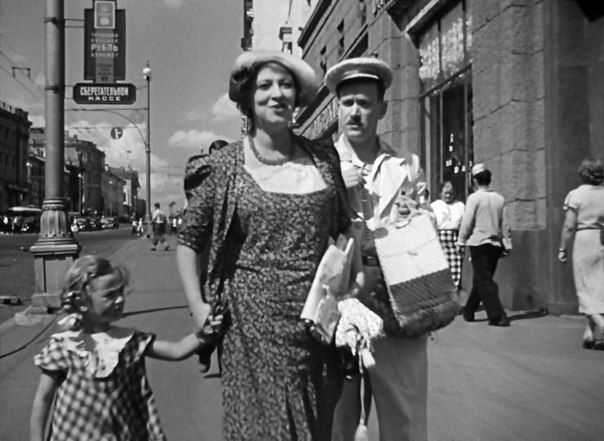
Shot in movie

== Cast ==
- Veronika Lebedeva as Natasha
- Faina Ranevskaya as Lyalya
- Pyotr Repnin as Mulya, Lyalya's husband
- Rostislav Plyatt as bachelor
- Rina Zelyonaya as Arisha, housekeeper
- Olga Zhiznyeva as Nelia Valeryanovna, Natasha's and Yura's mother
- Victor Gromov as Nina's father
- Tatyana Barysheva as dentist
- Elya Bykovskaya as Nina, Yura's schoolmate (uncredited)
- Dima Glukhov as Yura, Natasha's brother (uncredited)
- Vitya Boyko as Alyosha, Yura's schoolmate (uncredited)
- Andrey Starostin as cameo, football player (uncredited)
- Stanislaus Leyta as cameo, football player (uncredited)
- Nikolay Arsky as militia chief (uncredited)
- Ivan Lobyzovsky as Sergeev, member of the search group (uncredited)
- Lev Anninsky as boy from the kindergarten (uncredited)
- Anatoli Papanov as passer (uncredited)
- Fyodor Odinokov as passer (uncredited)
- Oleg Basilashvili as boy on the bike (uncredited)

== History ==
During the years of the Great Patriotic War, the film's negative was destroyed during the bombing, but a preserved positive copy was found in the USSR State Film Fund.
