= Aleksander Shlepyanov =

Alexander Ilyich Shlepyanov (Russian: Александр Ильич Шлепянов; 9 September 1933 – 19 December 2016), was a film script writer and art expert.

He was born in Moscow, the son of Ilya Shlepyanov, who was the principal artist at the Meyerhold Theatre of Moscow in the 1920s and later director of Kirov Theatre in Leningrad. He studied at the famous school Petrischule. After graduating from Leningrad University, Shlepyanov worked as a journalist, TV presenter, and script writer. He wrote more than forty film scripts.

Shlepyanov was one of the three collectors who organized the Russian Collectors Society, established in the USSR at the beginning of Perestroika. In 1988 he helped organize an exhibition at the Barbican in London called "100 Years of Russian Art", which included some of his own collection. This was the first time that works of the 1920s from private collections had been seen in public for 70 years.

In 1988 Shlepyanov moved to London, where he worked as an expert on Russian art at Phillips Auction House (now Bonhams), and then as independent art expert. From 2000 to 2003 Shlepyanov edited and published the Russian language magazine Kololol. He lived in London, where he died on 19 December 2016.

== Films ==
- Bip is staying in Leningrad (Бип остается в Ленинграде) (1961)
- Eduardo (Eduardo De Filippo) (Эдуардо) (1962)
- Benny Goodman and his Jazz Orchestra (Бени Гудман и Джаз-Оркестр) (1963)
- The Bronze Horseman (Медный всадник) (1963)
- We are from Murom (Мы Муромские) (1962)
- Inna (Инна) (1963)
- Marina's Life (Маринино житьё) (1966)
- Erzia (Эрьзя) (1966)
- Dead Season (1968)
- Comity of 19 (Комитет 19-ти) (1971)
- Residence Permit (Вид на Жительство)
- Cousin Ponse (Кузен Понс) (1978)
- Courage - 7 series (Мужество 7 серий) (1980 film)
- The Queen of Spades (1982)
- This Three Winning Cards (Эти три верные карты) (1988)
