= The Blue Bird (1970 film) =

1976 film

- Directed by: Vasily Livanov
- Written by: Maurice Maeterlinck
- Screenplay by: Vasily Livanov
- Based on: The Blue Bird by Maurice Maeterlinck
- Starring: Liya Akhedzhakova; Vladimir Kenigson; Yury Yakovlev; Rina Zelyonaya; Lyudmila Gnilova
- Edited by: Lydia Kyaksht
- Music by: Gennady Gladkov
- Production company: Soyuzmultfilm
- Release date: 1970
- Running time: 99 min
- Country: Soviet Union
- Language: Russian

The Blue Bird (Russian: Синяя птица, Sinyaya Ptitsa) is a 1970 Soviet animated feature film based upon the 1908 play by Maurice Maeterlinck. It was directed by Vasily Livanov and made at the Soyuzmultfilm studio.

The film is known for blending traditional and cutout styles of animation. Its music was composed by Gennady Gladkov and performed by the State Symphony Cinema Orchestra (under the direction of Vladimir Vasilyev); the Moscow state chorus; and the children's chorus, "Sputnik".

== Plot ==
The film is set in a modern capitalist city. While searching for food at the market, a boy saves a stray dog from a cruel salesman. An old woman passing by witnesses the act and reveals that she is a fairy. She gives the boy a caged bluebird as a reward, stating that it can neither be sold nor bought, but can be given as a gift. He hides the bluebird in his attic, and plans to show it to his little sister.

At night, the brother and sister enter the attic to encounter their long-dead grandparents. The grandparents reveal that the bluebird has been stolen by a cat named Puss. They say that the bluebird contains happiness for all, so it must be rescued and set free.

The children and the dog set out in search of the bluebird. They meet a rich man who wants to use the bluebird to start a war and conquer the world. The rich man tempts the children with various delicacies to make them forget about the bluebird, but the fairy helps them escape.

The children make their way into the dark mines, where cheerful workers welcome them and offer gifts of bread. The fairy appears once more to provide the eternal companions of man: Fire, Water, and Bread. The group learns that Puss has kidnapped the bluebird at the behest of his mistress, Night, so that she can sell it to the rich man. Her plans are thwarted when Fire burns Night, Puss drowns in Water, and the boy steals the bird from the rich man.

After recovering the bluebird, the boy falls off a clock tower. Morning comes, and the boy wakes to discover that their journey was only a dream. He and his sister go to the attic and release the bluebird into the wild.

== Crew ==
Title	English name	Russian name
Director	Vasily Livanov	Василий Ливанов
Scenario	Vasily Livanov	Василий Ливанов
Art Directors	Boris Sadovnikov; Maks Zherebchevskiy	Борис Садовников; Макс Жеребчевский
Artists	S. Kuznetsov; Anna Atamanova; Stanislav Sokolov; L. Chalaya; Z. Zarb; Alexei Solovyov; Ye. Balabanova; Dmitriy Anpilov	С. Кузнецов; Анна Атаманова; Станислав Соколов; Л. Чалая; З. Зарб; Алексей Соловьёв; Е. Балабанова; Дмитрий Анпилов
Animators	Kirill Malyantovich; Yana Volskaya; Gennadiy Sokolskiy; Anatoliy Abarenov; Yuriy Kuzyurin; Iosif Kuroyan; Yuriy Butyrin; Valentin Kushnerev; Oleg Safronov; Nataliya Bogomolova; Violetta Kolesnikova; Boris Butakov; S. Zhutovskaya; Sergei Dyozhkin	Кирилл Малянтович; Яна Вольская; Геннадий Сокольский; Анатолий Абаренов; Юрий Кузюрин; Иосиф Куроян; Юрий Бутырин; Валентин Кушнерев; Олег Сафронов; Наталия Богомолова; Виолетта Колесникова; Борис Бутаков; С. Жутовская; Сергей Дёжкин
Camera Operator	Mikhail Druyan	Михаил Друян
Executive Producer	Lyubov Butyrina	Любовь Бутырина
Composer	Gennady Gladkov	Геннадий Гладков
Sound Operator	Georgiy Martynyuk	Георгий Мартынюк
Script Editor	Arkadiy Snesarev	Аркадий Снесарев
Voice Actors	Liya Akhedzhakova; Vladimir Kenigson; Yury Yakovlev (grandpa); Rina Zelyonaya (grandma); Lyudmila Gnilova	Лия Ахеджакова; Владимир Кенигсон; Юрий Яковлев (Дедушка); Рина Зелёная (Бабушка); Людмила Гнилова
Editor	Lidiya Kyaksht	Лидия Кякшт

== See also ==
- History of Russian animation
- List of animated feature-length films
