= Boris Klyuyev =

Soviet and Russian actor (1944–2020)

- Бори́с Клю́ев
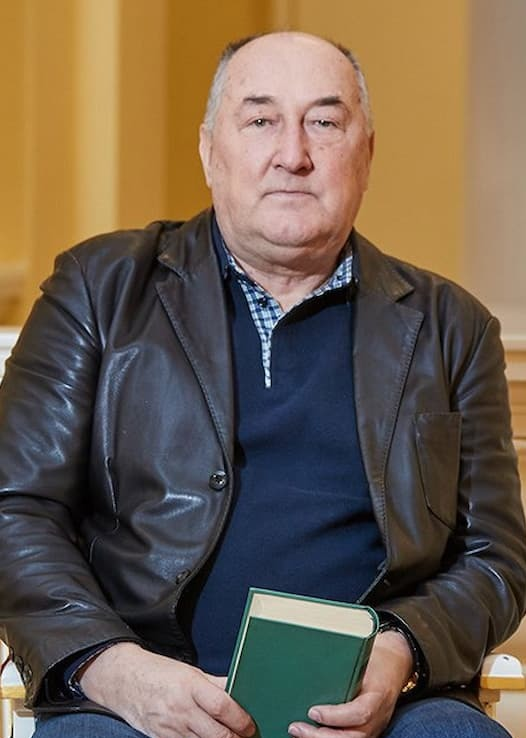
- Boris Klyuyev in 2018
- Born: Boris Vladimirovich Klyuyev; 13 July 1944; Moscow, Russian SFSR, USSR
- Died: 1 September 2020 (aged 76); Moscow, Russia
- Citizenship: USSR; Russia
- Education: Mikhail Shchepkin Higher Theatre School
- Alma mater: Maly Theatre
- Occupations: Actor, voice actor, drama teacher
- Years active: 1967—2020
- Height: 187 cm (6 ft 2 in)

Boris Vladimirovich Klyuyev (Russian: Бори́с Влади́мирович Клю́ев; 13 July 1944 — 1 September 2020) was a Soviet and Russian actor and drama teacher. He served as one of the lead actors of the Maly Theatre from 1969 to 2020 and taught acting technique in Shchepkin Higher Theatre School. He was named a People's Artist of Russia in 2002. He died on 1 September 2020 at the age of 76 from lung cancer.

== Biography ==
Boris Klyuyev was born in Moscow. He spent his childhood in the area of the Patriarch Ponds. When Boris was four years old, his father Vladimir Klyuyev died from a heart attack at the age of 36. Due to the difficult financial situation in the family, Boris had to unload wagons since he was 13. He started working at a construction site at the age of 16.

After graduating from school Klyuyev entered Shchepkin Higher Theatre School. In a year he joined the Soviet Army and served for three years. During his army service, he took part in the extras on the set of Sergei Bondarchuk's War and Peace. Klyuyev returned to the theatre school after demobilization and served as the school's Komsomol secretary. He graduated from Shchepkin Higher Theatre School in 1969. After that he was offered to join the troupe of the Maly Theatre.

During his fourth year at the theatre school, Klyuyev started his film career. His first significant role was Vasily Shulgin in The Fall of the Empire (1971). Klyuyev became famous across the country for portraying Comte de Rochefort in Georgi Yungvald-Khilkevich's D'Artagnan and Three Musketeers (1978) and Mycroft Holmes in Igor Maslennikov's The Adventures of Sherlock Holmes and Dr. Watson (1980).

Since 1990s Klyuyev took part in Russian dubbing of foreign movies. He mostly voiced characters played by Alan Rickman, Christopher Lee and Geoffrey Rush. Klyuyev's most famous role in 2010s was a grumpy and mocking retiree Nikolai Petrovich Voronin in sitcom Voronin's Family, a Russian adaptation of Everybody Loves Raymond.

Klyuev was diagnosed with lung cancer in May 2018. He died on September 1, 2020, in Moscow and was buried at the Troyekurovskoye Cemetery.

== Selected filmography ==
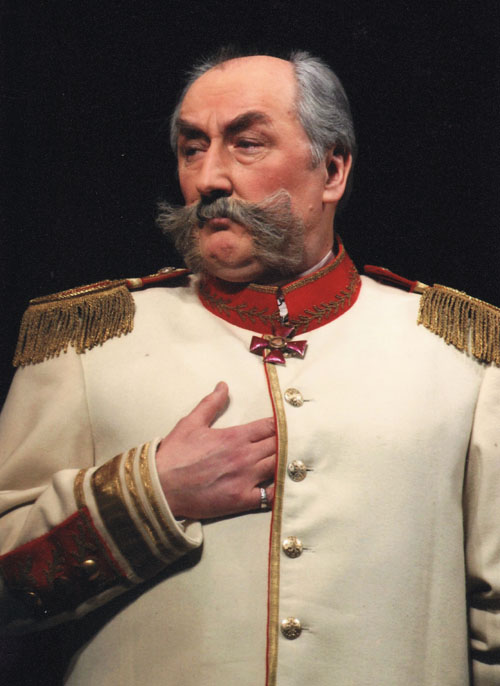
Klyuyev in a Maly Theatre production of Enough Stupidity in Every Wise Man, 2008

- 1967: War and Peace (Война и мир) as a French soldier
- 1968: Punisher (Каратель) as the prowler guard
- 1969: The Red Tent (Красная палатка) as the reporter
- 1971: The Fall of the Empire (Крушение империи) as Vasily Shulgin
- 1978: D'Artagnan and Three Musketeers (д'Артаньян и три мушкетера) as Comte de Rochefort
- 1979: Sherlock Holmes and Dr. Watson (Шерлок Холмс и доктор Ватсон) as Mycroft Holmes (uncredited)
- 1980: Squadron of Flying Hussars (Эскадрон гусар летучих) as French officer
- 1980: The Adventures of Sherlock Holmes and Dr. Watson (Приключения Шерлока Холмса и доктора Ватсона) as Mycroft Holmes
- 1982: La vie de Berlioz (Жизнь Берлиоза) as Richard Wagner
- 1982: Niccolò Paganini (Никколо Паганини) as Ferdinando Paer
- 1984 / 1986: Mikhailo Lomonosov (Михайло Ломоносов) as Grigory Orlov
- 1984: TASS Is Authorized to Declare... (ТАСС уполномочен заявить ... ) as Sergey Dubov (Agent 'Trianon')
- 1986: The Twentieth Century Approaches (Приключения Шерлока Холмса и доктора Ватсона. Двадцатый век начинается) as Mycroft Holmes
- 1986: Ballad of an Old Gun (Баллада о старом оружии) as SS officer
- 1987: The End of Eternity (Конец Вечности) as Sociologist Voin
- 1987: Moonzund (Моонзунд) as Von Grapf
- 1989: The Criminal Quartet (Криминальный квартет) as the factory chief engineer
- 1990: His Nickname Is Beast (…По прозвищу «Зверь») as the taciturn prisoner
- 1991: Genius (Гений) as Aleksandr Arkhipov
- 1991: Socrates (Сократ) as Critias
- 1992: Dreams of Russia (Сны о России) as Russian naval officer
- 1993: The Alaska Kid as Cameron Brody
- 1993: Split (Раскол) as Grand Duke Sergei
- 1996: Queen Margot (Королева Марго) as Duc de Guise
- 1997: Schizophrenia (Шизофрения) as Lozovsky the banker
- 2007: The Funeral Party (Весёлые похороны) as Lyova Gottlieb
- 2009 / 2019: Voronin's Family (Воронины) as Nikolai Petrovich Voronin
- 2012: The Ballad of Uhlans (Уланская баллада) as Count Aleksey Arakcheyev
- 2013 / 2015: Streets of Broken Lights (Улицы разбитых фонарей) as General Merzlyakin
- 2014 / 2016: Fizruk (Физрук) as Chernyshov
- 2018: Godunov (Годунов) as Dionysius, Metropolitan of Moscow

=== Dubbing ===
- 1977: The Rescuers as Mr. Chairman (Bernard Fox)
- 1988: Oliver and Company as Francis (Roscoe Lee Browne)
- 1989: The Little Mermaid as King Triton (Kenneth Mars)
- 1997: Fire Down Below as Jack Taggert (Steven Seagal)
- 1997: Anjo Mau as Ruy Novaes (Mauro Mendonça), Tadeu Facchini (Daniel Dantas), Américo Abreu (Sérgio Viotti), Júlio (Luciano Szafir)
- 1999: Bowfinger as Hal (Barry Newman)
- 1999: The Ninth Gate as Boris Balkan (Frank Langella)
- 1999: The General's Daughter as Lieutenant General Joe Campbell (James Cromwell)
- 1999: Sleepy Hollow as Baltus Van Tassel (Michael Gambon)
- 2000: The Art of War as Douglas Thomas (Donald Sutherland)
- 2000: How the Grinch Stole Christmas as Mayor Augustus MayWho (Jeffrey Tambor)
- 2000: Battlefield Earth as Planetship Numph (Shaun Austin-Olsen)
- 2000: Space Cowboys as General Vostov (Rade Šerbedžija)
- 2001: The Lord of the Rings: The Fellowship of the Ring as Saruman (Christopher Lee)
- 2001: Enigma as Admiral Trowbridge (Corin Redgrave)
- 2001: American Pie 2 as Jim's Dad (Eugene Levy)
- 2003: Johnny English as Pegasus (Tim Pigott-Smith)
- 2004: The Prince and Me as Prime Minister (Henrik Jandorf)
- 2004: The Aviator as Robert E. Gross (Brent Spiner)
- 2004: Spartan as Robert Burch (Ed O'Neill)
- 2004: The Terminal as Frank Dixon (Stanley Tucci)
- 2004: Romasanta as Professor Philips (David Gant)
- 2004: The Alibi as The Mormon (Sam Elliott)
- 2005: Corpse Bride as Pastor Galswells (Christopher Lee)
- 2005: 2001 Maniacs as Professor Ackerman (Peter Stormare)
- 2006: The Good Shepherd as Dr. Fredericks (Michael Gambon)
- 2006: Perfume: The Story of a Murderer as Antoine Richis (Alan Rickman)
- 2006: Flushed Away as the Toad (Ian McKellen)
- 2006: I Do as Francis Bertoff (Wladimir Yordanoff)
- 2006: Man of the Year as President Kellogg (David Nichols)
- 2007: Shooter as Mikhayo Sczerbiak / Michael Sandor (Rade Sherbedgia)
- 2007: Awake as Dr. Jonathan Neyer (Arliss Howard)
- 2007: Elizabeth: The Golden Age as Sir Francis Walsingham (Geoffrey Rush)
- 2007: The Hunting Party as Franklin Harris (James Brolin)
- 2007: Angel as Lord Norley (Christopher Benjamin)
- 2008: The Tale of Despereaux as the Inquisitor
- 2008: Superhero Movie as Dr. Whitby (Jeffrey Tambor)
- 2010: The King's Speech as Lionel Logue (Geoffrey Rush)
- 2011: Gnomeo and Juliet as Lord Redbrick (Michael Caine)
- 2011: Rango as Tortoise John (Ned Beatty)
- 2012: Gambit as Lord Lionel Shabandar (Alan Rickman)
- 2012: The Best Offer as Virgil Oldman (Geoffrey Rush)
- 2012: Killing Them Softly as the driver (Richard Jenkins)
- 2015: Minions as the narrator (Geoffrey Rush)
- 2016: Gods of Egypt as Ra (Geoffrey Rush)
- 2018: Sherlock Gnomes as Lord Redbrick (Michael Caine)

== Awards ==
- Merited Artist of RSFSR (1989)
- Order of Friendship (1999)
- People's Artist of Russia (2002)
- Order of Honour (2008)
- TEFI (2012)
- Russian Federation Presidential Certificate of Honour (2015)
- Order "For Merit to the Fatherland", IV class (2019)
