= The Admirer =

- Directed by: Nikolai Lebedev
- Written by: Nikolai Lebedev; Olga Nagdaseva
- Produced by: Evgeniy Golynsky; Ilya Neretin; Igor Tolstunov
- Starring: Marina Cherepukhina; Yelena Safonova; Alexandra Mikhailovna; Sergei Garmash
- Cinematography: Sergei Machilsky
- Music by: Georgi Movsesyan
- Production company: NTV Profit
- Release date: 1999
- Running time: 93 minutes
- Country: Russia
- Language: Russian

The Admirer (Russian: Поклонник, romanized: Poklonnik) is a 1999 Russian thriller film directed by Nikolai Lebedev.

== Plot ==
The father of 13-year-old Lena (Marina Cherepukhina) Oleg (Sergei Garmash) divorces her stepmother Alexandra (Yelena Safonova) and goes to his mistress Marina (Maria Poroshina), and Lena is left to live with her stepmother. Wishing to show that they live well together, and prove her independence to the adults, Lena puts into play her ingenuity and charm and gets part-time work as a postman.

In the meantime at the post office the topic of discussion is some serial killer who keeps almost the whole city in fear. His victims are mostly young girls. Some he suffocates and from others cuts out their internal organs. Literally on the very first day of work late in the evening, a stranger (Andrey Andreyev) clad in a trenchcoat and hat, whose face she did not have time to see, protects Lena from hooligans and gives her a handful of chewing gum. Lena gets a liking towards him, and when adults talk about what a real man should be, Lena lists all the identifiers of this stranger: a coat, a hat, a chewing gum and a cigarette (the stranger lit a cigarette before Lena). After some time a strange incident occurs with her: during another evening while delivering post, someone attacks her and takes away her bag with newspapers. Lena is sure that this is the same notorious maniac. However, the very next day, late at night, she sees someone leaving her bag next to the post, and in the bag finds a bunch of chewing gum. Lena conceives the idea that the maniac and that mysterious stranger are one and the same person, although Lena's sympathy for him does not decrease from this. Lena's friend Ira offers to test this admirer's devotion by forcing him to buy her roller skates. On the same day, someone calls Lena home, but says nothing and remains silent in the phone. Lena is sure that this is her admirer and asks him not to scare her so much as then with the bag, and at the same time asks to know how much the roller blades are worth. The next day Lena finds the skates inside the mailbox when picking up newspapers.

Relations with this strange admirer who is ready to fulfill all her instructions, start to seem like an exciting game to Lena. After some time, Marina comes home to Lena and asks the girl not to be angry with her father because he is very worried about her, but Lena does not hold back (especially after she found out earlier that her father can not pay child support due to financial circumstances) and lets out all her rage on her. When she leaves, Lena discovers that the mysterious admirer was a witness of their conversation, and the next day it turns out that Marina is in a hospital in crippled condition. Lena understands who has beaten Marina, and respects this maniac-admirer even more than before. However, she wants him to reveal himself to her, which the admirer does not intend to do and at some point Lena on the phone says that she hates him throws away the beautiful handkerchief she found in the post box. But she still does not understand that the admirer does not like it when people abandon him, and so not only her friends are in danger, but she first of all is under threat.

== Cast ==
- Marina Cherepukhina - Lena
- Yelena Safonova - Alexandra Mikhailovna
- Sergei Garmash - Oleg Viktorovich
- Nina Usatova - Irina Sergeevna
- Boris Shcherbakov - investigator
- Anton Kolesnikov - Tolik
- Svetlana Toma - Englishwoman
- Mikhail Krylov - Seryozhenka
- Maria Poroshina - Marina
- Nina Grebeshkova - false grandmother
- Konstantin Khabensky - Stas
- Alexandra Gladkova - Ira
- Michael Dorozhkin - Igor
- Ekaterina Durova - Raisa, postman
- Marina Golub - Valentine, the postman
- Natalia Shchukina - Julia, the postman
- Lyubov Rumyantseva - lawyer

== Awards ==
- Kinoshock 1999 — Prize of the jury of distributors to director Nikolai Lebedev - "for high professional skills and potential spectator opportunities"
- Kinoshock 1999 — Best Actress (Marina Cherepukhina)
