= Vitaly Solomin =

Russian actor (1941-2002)

- Виталий Соломин
- Born: 12 December 1941; Chita, Zabaykalsky Krai, Russian SFSR, Soviet Union
- Died: 27 May 2002 (aged 60); Moscow, Russia
- Occupations: Actor, theatre director
- Years active: 1960–2002

Vitaly Mefodievich Solomin (Russian: Виталий Мефодьевич Соломин; 12 December 1941 – 27 May 2002) was a Soviet and Russian actor, director and screenwriter, best remembered for playing Dr. Watson in a series of Sherlock Holmes adaptations for Soviet television. He was the younger brother of Yury Solomin.

== Biography ==
Vitaly Solomin was born in 1941 in Chita, Zabaykalsky Krai, Soviet Union, to a family of professional musicians. From childhood he was fascinated by music and learned to play the piano. On leaving school he went to Moscow and in 1959 he entered Shchepkin's drama school. He studied in the class of Nikolay Annenkov.

While a student, Vitaly rehearsed and performed at the Maly Theatre. After finishing the school he became an actor at this theater.

In the 1960s Vitaly Solomin began to appear in films. He debuted in 1963 in 1 Newton street. His first big role was as Kirill in the 1966 film Elder sister.

Vitaly Solomin shot to fame after playing the leading role as Cossack Roman in the epic film Dauria (1971) where he worked with his brother Yury Solomin and other Russian stars, such as Yefim Kopelyan, Viktor Pavlov and Vasily Shukshin.

During the 1980s his performances in films directed by Igor Maslennikov were especially successful. Most famous of these was his role as Dr. Watson in a series of films about Sherlock Holmes (1979—1986). In 1982 Maslennikov invited him to play the role of Count Tomsky in The Queen of Spades, an adaptation of Alexander Pushkin's story. His work in the film series Winter Cherry was very successful.

From 1 September 1986 to September 1989 Solomin worked in the Mossovet Theatre. There he acted in a play based on Viktor Astafyev's Sad Detective. In 1991 he returned to the Maly Theatre and staged Alexander Ostrovsky's Savage, playing the role of Ashmetiev.

Solomin wrote the screenplay for and directed the 1994 film The Hunt.

On 4 November 1974, he received the title of Honored Artist of the RSFSR, and on 3 February 1992 of People's Artist of the RSFSR. In April 2002, Vitaly Solomin suffered a stroke which proved to be fatal; he died on 27 May 2002 and is interred in Vagankovo Cemetery.

== Personal life ==
Vitaly Solomin's first wife was the actress Natalia Rudnaya. The marriage soon fell apart. On 28 October 1970, he married the actress Maria Solomina (née Leonidova). In 1974 they had a daughter Anastasia, and in May 1984 a daughter Yelizaveta.

== Filmography ==
Year	English Title	Original Title	Role	Notes
1964	The Chairman	Председатель	Valyozhin, surgeon	
1965	Beloved	Любимая	Volodya Levadov	
1965	I Am Twenty	Мне двадцать лет		Uncredited
1966	Women	Женщины	Zhenya Bednov	
1967	Older Sister	Старшая сестра	Kirill	
1967	Tough Nut	Крепкий орешек	Lieutenant Ivan Groznykh	
1967	The Kingdom of Women	Бабье царство	Kostya Lubentsov	
1969	To the New Shores	К новым берегам	Modest Mussorgsky	TV movie
1971	Hail, Mary!	Салют, Мария!	Seva Chudreev	
1972	Dauria	Даурия	Roman Ulybin	
1972	Here's My Village	Вот моя деревня	Dmitri Nikolaevich, school principal	mini-series
1979	Die Fledermaus	Летучая мышь	Falke	TV movie
1979	Siberiade	Сибириада	Nikolai Ustyuzhanin	
1979	Sherlock Holmes and Dr. Watson	Шерлок Холмс и доктор Ватсон	Dr. Watson	2 episodes
1980	The Adventures of Sherlock Holmes and Dr. Watson	Приключения Шерлока Холмса и доктора Ватсона	Dr. Watson	3 episodes
1981	The Hound of the Baskervilles	Собака Баскервилей	Dr. Watson	TV movie
1982	The Queen of Spades	Пиковая дама	Count Tomsky	
1983	The Treasures of Agra	Сокровища Агры	Dr. Watson	2 episodes
1984	Return from Orbit	Возвращение с орбиты	Vyacheslav Mukhin	
1985	Winter Cherry	Зимняя вишня	Vadim Dashkov	
1987	The Twentieth Century Approaches	Двадцатый век начинается	Dr. Watson	2 episodes
1990	Winter Cherry 2	Зимняя вишня 2	Vadim Dashkov	
1992	Dreams of Russia	Сны о России	Alexander Bezborodko	
1993	Uncle Vanya	Дядя Ваня	Mikhail Lvovich Astrov	
1995	Winter Cherry 3	Зимняя вишня 3	Vadim Dashkov	
1998	Tests for Real Men	Тесты для настоящих мужчин		
2001	Request Stop	Остановка по требованию	Investigator Itcenko	TV series
2003	All or Nothing	Пан или пропал	Leszek Krzyżanowski	TV series
2003	Casus belli	Казус белли	Mikhail	final film role
