= The Treasures of Agra =

1983 film directed by Igor Maslennikov

The Treasures of Agra (Russian: Приключения Шерлока Холмса и доктора Ватсона: Сокровища Агры) is a 1983 Soviet television film, the fourth of five in the series The Adventures of Sherlock Holmes and Dr. Watson. It was directed by Igor Maslennikov.

It starred Vasily Livanov as Sherlock Holmes and Vitaly Solomin as Dr. Watson.

It consists of two episodes: Part One, based on Arthur Conan Doyle's 1890 novel The Sign of the Four (beginning), and Part Two, based on his 1891 short story "A Scandal in Bohemia" and The Sign of the Four (continuation and conclusion).
