= Boryslav Brondukov =

Soviet and Ukrainian actor (1938–2004)

- Born: 1 March 1938
- Died: 10 March 2004
- Occupation: Film actor

Boryslav Mykolayovych Brondukov (Ukrainian: Борислáв Миколáйович Брондукóв; Russian: Борислав Николаевич Брондуков; 1 March 1938 – 10 March 2004) was a Soviet and Ukrainian film character actor, People's Artist of Ukraine.

== Life and career ==
He was born in the village of Dubova in Poliske Raion of Kyiv Oblast, then part of the Soviet Union, in a Russian-Polish family. After graduating a construction vocational school he started to work at the Kiev Arsenal factory which after World War II was once again established in the city.

At this time Brondukov began to perform in theater as well. His work was seen by the rector of Karpenko-Karyi Institute of Theatrical Arts in Kiev and at an age of 23 Borislav became a student there.

Since 1965 Brondukov has been an actor of the Dovzhenko Film Studios (Kiev), though he has worked at many other film studios in the Soviet Union as well.

Brondukov became a People's Artist of the Ukrainian SSR (1988) and the first winner of the Olexander Dovzhenko Ukrainian State Prize (1995).

He was featured in over 100 movies among which are Zakhar Berkut, Babylon XX, Mimino, the Sherlock Holmes and Dr. Watson TV series (as Inspector Lestrade), and others.

== Selected filmography ==
- Flower on the Stone (Russian: Цветок на камне, 1962) as Kovalyov
- Viy (Вий, 1967) as divinity student (uncredited)
- Annychka (Аннычка, 1968) as Krupyak
- The Stone Cross (Камінний хрест, 1968)
- Dangerous Tour (Опасные гастроли, 1969) as Antip, the watchman
- Olesya (Олеся, 1971) as Yarmola
- Bonus (Премия, 1975) as Aleksandr Zyubin
- Gypsies Are Found Near Heaven (Табор уходит в небо, 1975) as Bucha
- Afonya (Афоня, 1975) as Fedulov
- The Captivating Star of Happiness (Звезда пленительного счастья, 1975) as soldier
- The Days of the Turbins (Дни Турбиных, 1976) as Bolshevik agitator
- The Troubled Month of Veresen (Тревожный месяц вересень, 1977) as Popelenko
- Mimino (Мимино, 1977) as helicopter passenger
- The Nose (Нос, 1977) as Ivan
- Autumn Marathon (Осенний марафон, 1979) as casual passer
- Sherlock Holmes and Dr. Watson (Приключения Шерлока Холмса и доктора Ватсона. Знакомство, 1979) as Inspector Lestrade
- The Garage (Гараж, 1981) as The Groom
- The Adventures of Sherlock Holmes and Dr. Watson (Приключения Шерлока Холмса и доктора Ватсона. Смертельная схватка, 1980) as Inspector Lestrade
- The Hound of the Baskervilles (Приключения Шерлока Холмса и доктора Ватсона. Собака Баскервилей, 1981) as Inspector Lestrade
- Say a Word for the Poor Hussar (О бедном гусаре замолвите слово, 1981) as 2nd jailer
- Tears Were Falling (Слёзы капали, 1982) as Fyodor
- Sportloto-82 (Спортлото-82, 1982) as director of the tourist camp
- The Treasures of Agra (Приключения Шерлока Холмса и доктора Ватсона. Сокровища Агры, 1983) as Inspector Lestrade
- We Are from Jazz (Мы из джаза, 1983) as fake of Captain Kolbasyev
- If to Believe Lopotukhin... (Если верить Лопотухину, 1983) as Uncle Kolya
- A Cruel Romance (Жестокий романс, 1984) as servant
- Dangerous for Your Life! (Опасно для жизни, 1985) as Andrey Pavlovich Peredelkin
- The Twentieth Century Approaches (Приключения Шерлока Холмса и доктора Ватсона. Двадцатый век начинается, 1986) as Inspector Lestrade
- A Man from the Boulevard des Capucines (Человек с бульвара Капуцинов, 1987) as stray cowboy
- Bright Personality (Светлая личность, 1988) as head of personnel
- The Master and Margarita (Мастер и Маргарита, 1994) as Ivan Savilievich Varenukha
