= Rina Zelyonaya =

Soviet actress, singer and comedian (1901–1991)

- Рина Зелёная
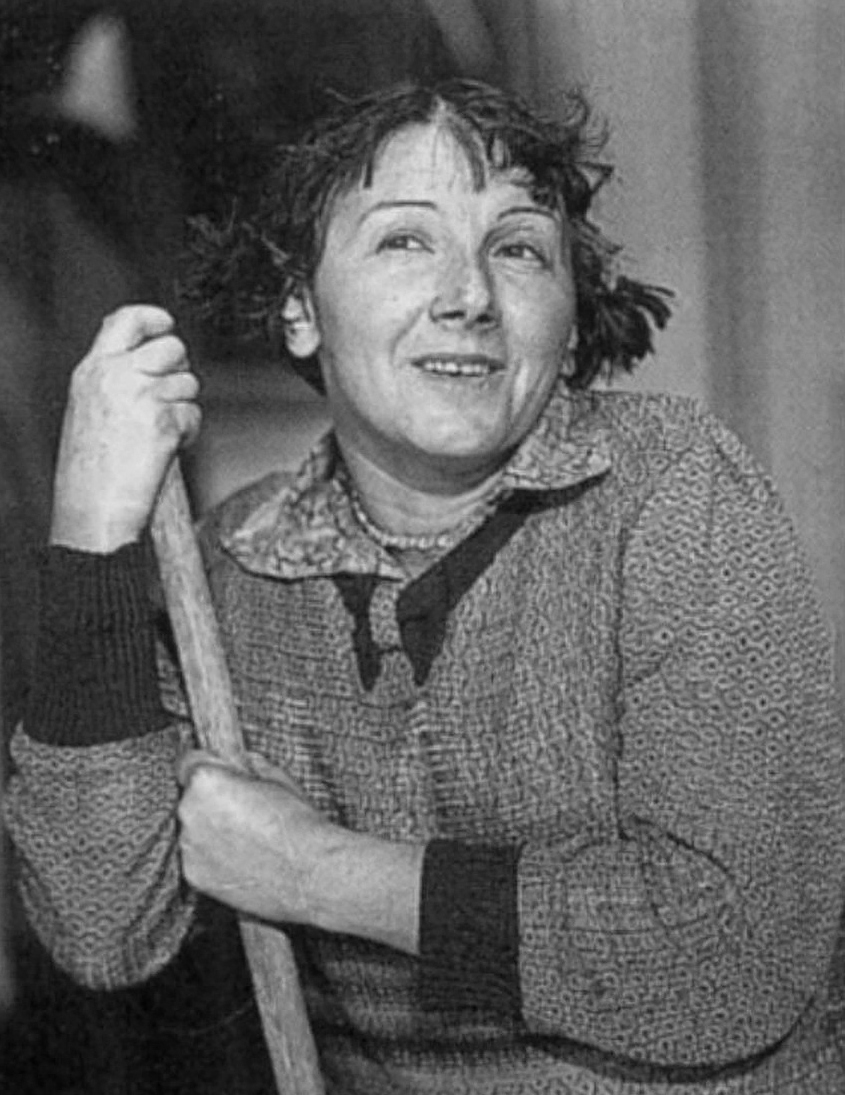
- Zelyonaya in The Foundling in 1939
- Born: Ekaterina Vasilyevna Zelyonaya; 7 November 1901; Tashkent, Syr-Darya Oblast, Russian Empire (now Uzbekistan)
- Died: 1 April 1991 (aged 89); Moscow, Russian SFSR, Soviet Union (now Russia)
- Resting place: Vvedenskoye Cemetery
- Years active: 1921–1986
- Spouse: Konstantin Topuridze

Ekaterina Vasilyevna Zelyonaya (Russian: Екатерина Васильевна Зелёная; 7 November [O.S. 25 October] 1901 — 1 April 1991), better known by her stage name Rina Zelyonaya, was a Soviet actress, singer and comedian. She was named People's Artist of the RSFSR in 1970.

== Biography ==
Ekaterina Zelyonaya was born in Tashkent (modern-day Uzbekistan) into a Russian family of modest means, the third of four children. Her rare surname which translates from Russian as Green had been often taken for a pseudonym by people, just like her stage name Rina (short for Ekaterina). Her paternal grandfather Ivan Kuzmich Zelyoniy was a member of the Tashkent City Duma. According to the actress, her parents didn't fit each other at all.

Her mother Nadezhda Fyodorovna Zelyonaya was given away to marriage at the age 16. She was absolutely careless and couldn't plan family budget which led to grand scandals involving her husband – Vasily Ivanovich Zelyoniy, a low-ranking official, a stingy and generally unsympathetic man, as Rina described him. After he was transferred to Moscow, Rina entered a prestigious gymnasium for girls despite the lack of money.

During the October Revolution she entered the Moscow Theatre School where she studied for two years. Among her teachers were Maria Blumenthal-Tamarina, Illarion Pevtsov and Nikolai Radin. Hunger and the lack of job made her seek other options. By that time her father had been assigned with restoration of storage facilities in Odessa. Rina along with her mother and younger sister decided to join him and traveled to Odessa, but it turned out Vasily Zelyoniy had left the family for another woman.

== Early popularity ==
Rina got sick with typhus along the way and as soon as she recovered, she joined the Odessa KROT theatre led by Viktor Tipot and Vera Inber, and that's where her career really started. After a while she returned to Moscow, performed in night cabarets with songs and musical numbers, and in 1924 became an actress of the Moscow Satire Theatre. From 1930 on she started performing with stand-up shows.

She became popular on account of her ability to imitate the speech of children. Although she appeared briefly in such well-known films as The Foundling (1939), for which she also co-wrote the script, Zelyonaya earned her living by touring the country and performing humorous skits from the life of children. She also provided the voice for cartoon characters and radio shows.

During the Great Patriotic War she visited the frontline and performed for soldiers, for which she was awarded the Order of the Red Star in 1944.

== Later life and death ==
At an advanced age, she was cast in film roles of grannies, notably as Mrs. Hudson in the TV series The Adventures of Sherlock Holmes and Dr. Watson filmed by the Lenfilm movie studio between 1979 and 1986. She also published a book of memoirs Scattered Pages in 1981 which had been re-released several times since.

She died of cancer on 1 April, the same day she was supposed to receive the title People's Artist of the USSR. She was later buried in Vvedenskoye Cemetery near her husband – a famous Georgian architect Konstantine Topuridze (1905—1977), designer of The Stone Flower Fountain in Moscow with whom they had spent 40 years together.

== Selected filmography ==
actress

- Road to Life (Russian: Путёвка в жизнь, 1931) as a girl from a gang Zhigan
- The Foundling (Подкидыш, 1939) as Arisha
- Tanya (Светлый путь, 1940) as secretary
- Encounter at the Elbe (Встреча на Эльбе, 1949) as female German with a bike
- Springtime (Весна, 1947) as film makeup artist
- The Girl Without an Address (Девушка без адреса, 1957) as Yelizaveta Timofeyevna
- A Groom from the Other World (Жених с того света, 1958) as Nina's mother
- Seven Nannies (Семь нянек, 1962) as woman in red
- Cain XVIII (Каин XVIII, 1963) as foreign governess
- A Tale of Lost Times (Сказка о потерянном времени, 1964) as old Nadia
- Operation Y and Shurik's Other Adventures (Операция "Ы“ и другие приключения Шурика, 1965) as a perturbed female passenger on bus №13
- Give me a complaints book (Дайте жалобную книгу, 1965) as elderly singer
- Three Fat Men (Три толстяка, 1966) as Ganimed
- The Twelve Chairs (12 стульев, 1971) as editor of "Bride and Groom"
- Chipollino (Чиполлино, 1972) as Countess Cherry
- The Adventures of Buratino (Приключения Буратино, 1975) as Tortila the Turtle
- About the Little Red Riding Hood (Про Красную Шапочку, 1977) as Grandma
- The Adventures of Sherlock Holmes and Dr. Watson (Приключения Шерлока Холмса и доктора Ватсона, 1979–1986) as Mrs. Hudson

voice

- The Key (Ключ, 1961) as fairy Giatsinta
- Who Said Meow? (Кто сказал мяу? 1962) as puppet
- A Little Frog Is looking for His Father (Лягушонок ищет папу? 1964) as little frog
- Vovka in a Far Away Kingdom (Вовка в Тридевятом царстве, 1965) as Vovka
- Most, Most, Most, Most (Самый, самый, самый, самый, 1966) as little Lion
- The Blue Bird (Синяя птица, 1970) as grandmother
- Losharik (Лошарик, 1971), as Losharik
- The Mystery of the Third Planet (Тайна третьей планеты, 1981) as Kolya's grandmother
- Alice in Wonderland (Алиса в Стране чудес, 1981) as Duchess
