= Vladimir Dashkevich =

Russian composer

Vladimir Sergeevich Dashkevich (Russian: Владимир Серге́евич Дашкевич) (born 20 January 1934) is a Russian composer, known mainly for his film music. Originally, he studied chemical technology at Moscow State University of Fine Chemical Technologies, but he later studied music under Aram Khachaturian. He achieved prominence in Russia for his music for the series of films The Adventures of Sherlock Holmes and Dr. Watson, as well as numerous other films. His longtime collaboration with famous singer Elena Kamburova has resulted in a number of vocal cycles based on the lyrics by the Russian Silver Age poets, including Requiem of Anna Akhmatova.

== Biography ==
His works include symphonies, operas and musicals, as well as chamber and vocal music. Thus, in 1996, the musical Bumbarash, to which Dashkevich wrote the music, was shown in three performances at the Salzburg Festival in Salzburg as a guest performance of Oleg Tabakov's Studio Theatre.

== Main works ==
- Symphony No. 1 (1964)
- Faustus, oratorio (1964)
- Concerto for cello and orchestra (1973)
- Bumbarash, musical (1974)
- Classified city (1974)
- The Bedbug, opera (1980)
- Pippi Longstocking, musical (1980)
- Along Unknown Paths (1982)
- How to Become Happy (1986)
- Symphony No. 4 Requiem (1988)
- Symphony No. 5 Save My Speech (1989)
- Katala (1989)
- Voroshilov Sharpshooter (1999)
- Sonata in Three Movements (Соната в трех частях) for viola and piano (2004)
- The Government Inspector, opera (2007)
- Concerto No. 1 for viola and orchestra (2007)
- Concerto No. 2 for viola and orchestra (2007)
- The Twelve, opera (2014)
