= Alla Demidova =

Soviet and Russian actress

- Алла Демидова
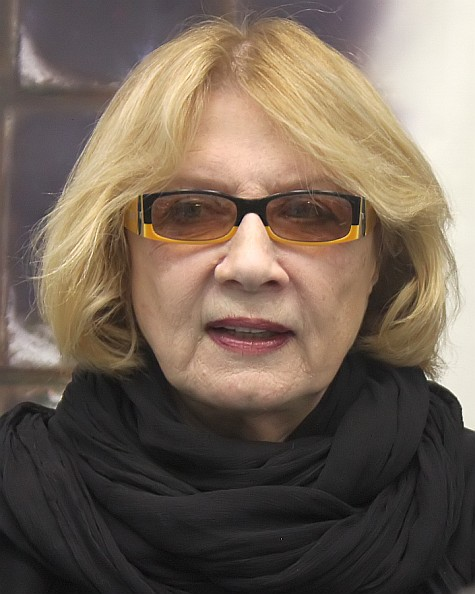
- Demidova in 2009
- Born: Alla Sergeyevna Demidova; 29 September 1936 (age 90); Moscow, Russian SFSR, Soviet Union
- Occupations: actress, writer
- Years active: 1962–now
- Spouse: Vladimir Valutskiy
- Awards: USSR State Prize (1977); People's Artist of Russia (1984); Order of Merit for the Fatherland (IV, 2007) (1997)
- Website: demidova.ru

Alla Sergeyevna Demidova (Russian: А́лла Серге́евна Деми́дова; born 29 September 1936) is a Russian actress internationally acclaimed for the tragic parts in innovative plays staged by Yuri Lyubimov in the Taganka Theatre. She was awarded the USSR State Prize (1977) and the Order of Merit for the Fatherland (twice, 2007, 2001).

== Life and career ==
Alla Demidova was born on 29 September 1936 in Zamoskvorechye, Moscow, and spent her early years at the Osipenko (now Sadovnicheskaya) Street. Her father Sergey Alekseyevich Demidov, an heir to the Russian industrialists' family, was jailed in 1932 in the course of the Great Purge, but soon got acquitted. In 1941 he joined the Red Army as a volunteer and was killed in action 1944, near Warsaw. Alla's mother, Aleksandra Dmitriyevna Demidova (née Kharchenko) was working at the Economy department of the Moscow University (later at its Cybernetics and economic programming section). Mother and daughter spent the World War II years in Vladimir, to the East of Moscow. "I received too little love from the people around me in those early years to remember them fondly," Demidova later confessed. She debuted as an actress on her school's amateur stage, enjoying her first taste of success.

=== Career ===
While still at school, Demidova joined the well-known Moscow actress Tatyana Shchekin-Krotova's courses to study drama. After the graduation she took the examinations at the Boris Shchukin Theatre Institute but failed due to flawed diction and enrolled in the Moscow University's Economy faculty. In 1959, after the graduation, she started teaching political economy at the University's Philosophy faculty. Before that, as a third year student, she joined the university Students' Theater, led by first Igor Lipsky, then Rolan Bykov. It was under the latter's guidance that in 1958 Demidova made her stage debut as Lida Petrusova in Such Kind of Love (Takaya lyubov), an adaptation of Pavel Kohout's play. Having joined the Shchukin School on the second attempt, Demidova started studying at the class of actress Anna Orochko, who experimented with her young protégé, and even suggested once that she should play Hamlet, something the actress would return to some forty years later. While still studying at the Shchukun Institute, Demidova performed in Vakhtangov Theatre's production of Death of Gods (Gibel bogov), in Princess Turandot and in The Cookie ("Stryapukha"). It was then that she was noticed by the French theatre specialist Jean Vilar who, after seeing the girl fencing in a gym, invited her to join the Theatre National Populaire, an offer that she had to decline. On the Shchukin stage she performed the leading role in Aleksander Afinogenov's Distant Things (Dalyokoye), played Mrs. Moon in The Scandalous Affair of Mr. Kettle and Mrs. Moon (after J. B. Priestley's play of the same name) and Madame Frisette in Frisette by Eugene Marin Labiche. In 1957 Demidova debuted on screen in the director Zakhar Agranenko's Leningrad Symphony. That was followed by Nine Years of One Year (director Mikhail Romm, 1961), What's a Relativity Theory? (Semyon Raitburg, 1963) and Komask (1965), the films she would later refer to as "my reconnaissance raid."

In 1964 Demidova graduated from the Shchukin Institute, having presented as her diploma work the role of Mrs. Young in Yuri Lyubimov's adaptation of Bertholt Brecht's The Good Person of Szechwan. "Her role was peripheral but that didn't matter. The effect of her physical presence was enormous," the actor Boris Khmelnitsky later remembered. The young actress unsuccessfully tried to return to the Vaktangov's, spent several months at the Mayakovsky Theatre again without any role to cling to, and in the end of 1964 joined Taganka (which opened officially in April that year) to be employed there regularly, but mostly in unsubstantial roles. The reason for Lyubimov's mistrust might have been the fact that in her first leading role here, that of Vera in A Hero of Our Time, Demidova, admittedly, 'failed miserably'. Several years of hard work in mass scenes and pantomimes followed. This master-and-servant type of relationship between the theater director and his actress continued for decades.

==== 1966 – 1979 ====
The leading role in Igor Talankin's Daylight Stars (Dnevnye zvyozdy, 1966), that of Olga Berggolts, proved to be the starting point of Demidova's film career. "The part was very close to my heart and artistically intriguing too. I had to play not just an ordinary woman, but a poet, which involved exploring the process of giving birth to poetry, as well as discovering this fine line between my heroine's every day tribulations and the film's sublime philosophical essence," she explained, speaking to the Yunost magazine in 1968. This success did little to dispel Demidova's intrinsic mistrust in the cinema as an art form. "What a pity such a full-bloodied role had been given to me in film, not in theater," she complained in the same interview.

1968 was the year of Demidova's major breakthrough when six of her films came out. Some of her roles (like that in Vladimir Basov's War-time thriller The Shield and the Sword) Demidova later dismissed as unworthy of attention, describing others (like that of a comissar in Two Comrades Were Serving) as "curious". More significant to her was the character of the SR party activist Maria Spiridonova in The 6th of July (1968), a rebel the actress was in many ways identifying herself with. "I've never been a dissident, I've always shied politics, may be because my grandmother was staroobryadka. Still for some reason 1917 always seemed to me a catastrophe and never in my life have I dabbled in politics – either in reality, or in films. Spiridonova, of course, was an exception, but then again, she was Lenin's opponent," Demidova said in a 2006 interview. Her Liza Protasova in The Living Corpse (1968) was praised by critics, even if Vladimir Vengerov's film itself received mixed reviews. In 1969 she appeared in Igor Talankin's Tchaikovsky as Yulia von Mekk.

In 1968 Demidova started to get major roles in Taganka, Elmyra in Molière's Tartuffe being the first in the line. Much lauded was Demidova's Pani Bozhentska in the adaptation of Jerzy Stawinski's The Rush Hour, the role she soon came to detest, though. "Outstanding" was how her Gertrude in Hamlet (with Vladimir Vysotskyin the leading role) was described. "In the play which was both phantasmagoric and strikingly real, Demidova artfully portrayed a woman, misguided rather than vile," wrote Raisa Benyash. Critics admired the actresses' willingness to approach the new dimensions in classics, bringing new light and shade to the well known characters of Russian theater's past. Still, Demidova felt underrated and ignored at Taganka and defined herself as an Efros's kind of actress. This was later corroborated by her colleagues. "She definitely wasn't what one may call a director's favourite, her life in Taganka was difficult. She managed to retain her individuality and refine her distinctive style only by using all of her inner strength, intelligence and talent," wrote fellow actor and author Veniamin Smekhov.

After the success of Hamlet, Demidova started to receive numerous offers, but felt disappointed with the way directors tried to exploit the most obvious aspects of her stage persona. Still, lauded were her performances as Arkadina in the 1972 movie Seagull (directed by Yuli Karasik, based on Anton Chekhov's play The Seagull), where the actress, making her character going through unexpected metamorphoses, totally outplayed her colleagues, as well as Lesia Ukrainka in I'm Going to You (Idu k tebe, 1971, directed by Nikolai Mashchenko). Her Anne Stanton (in All The King's Men, 1971) impressed Oleg Efremov, who reportedly remarked: "Of all our actresses, Demidova is the one who's got the liveliest eyes". Demidova played Lizaveta Pavlovna in Andrey Tarkovsky's Mirror (1975), the Magic Woman in Irina Povolotskaya's Scarlet Flower (Alenky tsvetochek, 1977), a fairytale which she "single-handedly transformed into a fable," according to critic A.Smolyakov, and the Duchess of Marlborough in Yuli Karasik's The Glass of Water (1979), alongside Kirill Lavrov's Lord Bolingbroke.

As Yuri Lyubimov, invited to direct at Milan's La Scala, left Taganka, Anatoly Efros entered in. He decided to produce The Cherry Orchard, aiming from the start to come up with something quite different from the old-fashioned textbook Moscow Art Theater version of the Chekhov's classic. Demidova as a 'modernist' Ranevskaya, managed to aesthetically re-vamp this character, merging tragedy and eccentricity, sentimentality and irony. Critics were divided in their assessment of Efros' concept and the quality of the production in general, but even detractors had to agree that what saved the experiment from flopping were Demidova and Vladimir Vysotsky as Lopatin. "Initially the [Chekhov's] heroine for me was totally alien. As time went by, I was beginning to see myself as 'me-as-Ranevskaya' more and more," Demidova remarked years later. One of the Efros interpretation's harshest critics was Lyubimov who described Demidova's performance as "mannered" and "grotesque." Tellingly, several years later he asked Demidova to reproduce what he called "the Ranevskaya algorithm" in the final act of Chekhov's Three Sisters (1981) where her Masha, initially ironic and aloof, demonstrated the disturbing outburst of emotions in the play's final stages. Among Demidova's other roles in Taganka of the time were Raskolnikov's mother in Dostoyevsky's Crime and Punishment (1979) and Marina Mnishek in Pushkin's Boris Godunov (1982), the latter banned by the Ministry of Culture's special decree (and premiered on 12 June 1988).

==== Demidova and Vysotsky ====
In the late 1970s Demidova and Vysotsky, both irritated by Lyubimov's artistic dictatorship, gravitated into a tandem (where, as one critic put it, "ice and fire clashed") to experiment with ideas of their own. "We both were beginning to realize that the time of massive, colourful theatrical shows has come to an end, and the new era of private, chamber theater was approaching," Demidova recalled. Having in mind the Vysotsky and Demidova's project, Vitaly Vulf translated into Russian Tennessee Williams' Out Cry, a play for two characters, brother and sister. Lyubimov saw it as an "ego act" (seeing as the original had been written for a couple of Broadway stars) and the fellow Taganka actors apparently took their boss's side. "As the first Act was ready, we advertised it locally, inviting everybody to come and see. Only two people showed up: [stage designer] David Borovsky and his friend. What would you expect: it's... theatre!" Demidova later bitterly remarked. The experiment was shelved, along with another project, their own version of Jean Racine's Phaedra. Months later Vysotsky died. "It was only after he was gone that I suddenly realized how much he'd meant to me as a partner... He was an exceptional actor, especially in his last years, the one who reigned the audience by literally magnetizing the air around him," she later remembered.

==== 1980s ====
In the early 1980s Demidova started to stage her own recital shows, each produced as a miniature theatrical play. Some, shown by the Soviet TV, became popular. In Pushkin's The Queen of Spades (directed by Igor Maslennikov, 1982) she not just recited the poem but acted out its characters, "casting a shade of Silver Age over the whole of this three cards' story." Demidova's collaboration with Anatoly Vasilyev in the film Stone Guest and Other Poems involved some role-juggling too. On stage she recited Anna Akhmatova (Requiem, Poem Without a Hero), Pushkin, Ivan Bunin, assorted Silver Age poets. Her own act's stage director, Demidova was now viewed as a star in a genre of her own. As a major influence she cited Giorgio Strehler, then a Theatre of Nations director, who in May 1987 invited Efros with two of his shows (At the Bottom and Cherry Orchard) to Milan. "It was Strehler who shaped my whole vision of the way those solo performances should be staged and designed... An easel, a candle, some music, synchronized translation – those were the elements of his original stage concept which I've made my own," Demidova remembered. "Just music and me, totally alienated from the audience: that was the idea that since then remained unchanged," she said in a 2010 interview. It was in her solo stage projects that Demidova managed finally to fulfil what's been left of her potential that Lyubimov and Efros, two renown Russian theater directors failed to notice and use, critic Tatyana Moskvina opined.

After Lyubimov's departure to the West, Demidova gradually withdrew from Taganka. In 1986 Efros revived the Cherry Orchard production, casting Demidova in the leading role. It won the 1st Prize at BITEF, then had a successful run in Paris, in the wake of its director's death. With Lyubimov coming back, Demidova returned to Taganka where she performed as Marina Mnishek (Boris Godunov, 1988) and Donna Anna (Feast Amidst Plague, 1989). In 1988 Alla Demidova joined forces with theatre director Roman Viktyuk who staged Marina Tsvetayeva's Phaedra. "The result was intriguing, it just never fitted into the Taganka's repertoire. We were invited to festivals, toured a lot but were being accused by Lyubimov for allegedly exploiting 'his brand'. Grabbing the first opportunity, I just bought the whole production off: costumes, decorations and everything, never sure what to do with this purchase," Demidova recalled. In the Modern History of the Soviet and Russian Cinema Phaedra was described as the best Soviet theatre production of the 1980s and arguably Viktyuk's most serious work.

==== 1990s ====
Demidova's performance as Electra in Sophocles' Electra which premiered in Athens, Greece, in 1992, happened to be her final one under Lyubimov. The production was short-lived, but the actress's performance garnered fine reviews. As the major conflict broke out in the theatre and Taganka split into two, Demidova supported Lyubimov. "I just refused to see how could a pupil betray their master," she later explained. Once it became obvious that the confrontation started to seriously undermine the quality of Taganka's work, Demidova quit the theatre.

In 1992 Demidova's own A Theater opened, with the production of Phaedra. In 1993 came out Quartet, a play by Heiner Mueller based on de Laclos' Dangerous Liaisons novel, produced by Demidova in collaboration with the Greek director Theodoros Terzopoulos. Quartet, which for the first time introduced the Russian audiences to the works of Mueller, was rated as one of the best premieres in Russian theatre that year by A.Smolyakov. The A Theater's next work (again with Terzopoulos), Mueller's version of Medea, premiered on 29 April 1996; Russian critics saw it as an attempt to create the new style of contemporary tragedy by reviving the "arch-myth, buried in human subconscious." Working with Terzopoulos changed Demidova's perception of theater. "After Electra, Phaedra and Medea all things that went before them tasted insipid," she confessed. In 2001 Hamlet the Master Class, the A Theatre and the Greek Attis theatres' joint production, came out. Premiered at the Moscow Theatrical Olympiad, it featured Demidova as Hamlet (her early tutor Anna Orochko's idea finally realised), as well as Gertrude and Ophelia.

In the 1990s Demidova appeared in several films, playing Lebyadkina (The Obsessed, 1992), Miss Minchin (Little Princess, 1997) and Elizaveta Alekseevna (Unseen Traveller, 1998). For two years she was teaching at the Boris Shchukin Theatre Institute (refusing to be paid, "so as not to feel tied up by it") but left, disappointed by her young students' response. Now firmly under the impression that theatre in Russia, as well as abroad, was in crisis, Demidova quit the stage altogether.

==== 2000 – present ====
In 2000–2002 Demidova appeared on screen twice, first as Lora Lyons (in Remembering Sherlock Holmes, a Russian TV serial) then as mad Elsa (in Letters to Elsa, a film based on Vladimir Vysotsky's son Arkady's screenplay). In Boris Blank's Death of Tairov (2004) Demidova played Alisa Koonen. "Enchanted by the character, I longed for that role, but the film proved to be devoid of dramatic scenes, and the script was bizarre, to put it mildly. Nevertheless, I managed to achieve some things: visual and aural similarity, by reproducing her voice and plastics – people who remembered her assured me as much," she later commented. Yuri Lyubimov was supposed to be cast as Tairov, but fell ill, was hospitalized and Mikhail Kozakov came in, making a disappointing substitution, as far as Demidova was concerned. For the leading role in Kira Muratova's The Tuner (2005) Demidova received the Nika Award and the Golden Eagle Award for the Best Actress, having portrayed a kind of "modern day Ranevskaya," as she put it, a pure and pathetic post-Chekhov character. After two more films – Igor Maslennikov's Russian Money (after Alexander Ostrovsky) where she played Murzavetskaya, and Sergey Kostin's historical documentary Waiting for the Empress (about Maria Fyodorovna, both 2006, – Demidova declared she's lost all interest in being filmed.

Throughout the 2000s Alla Demidova was staging her poetry recitals regularly (performing in Russia, Ukraine, Poland, Israel) and continued to do so in the early 2010s. As of 2014 she published nine books on theater, including Vladimir Vysotsky (1989), My Memory's News Ticker (2000) and Akhmatova's Mirrors (2004).

== Selected filmography ==
- Nine Days in One Year (1962)
- Two Comrades Were Serving (1968)
- The Shield and the Sword (1968)
- The Sixth of July (1968)
- Tchaikovsky (1970)
- All the King's Men (1971)
- The Seagull (1972)
- The Flight of Mr. McKinley (1975)
- Mirror (1975)
- Father Sergius (1978)
- A Glass of Water (1979)
- The Queen of Spades (1982)
- The Kreutzer Sonata (1987)
- The Tuner (2004)

== Accolades and honours ==
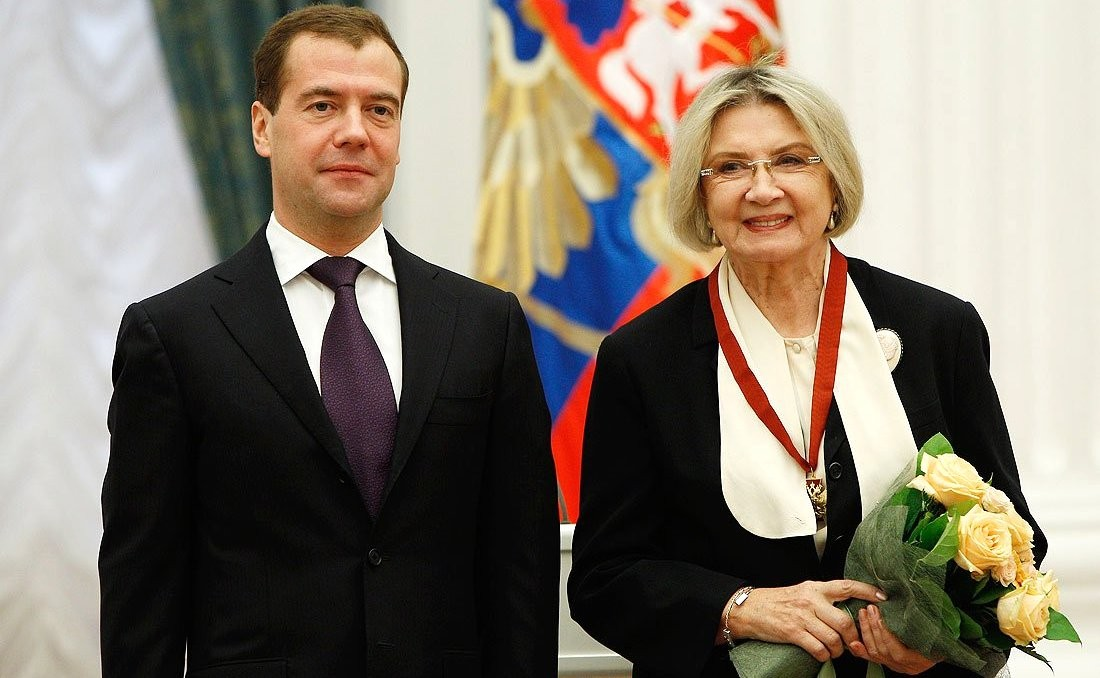
Alla Demidova receives the Order "For Merit to the Fatherland" (III) from Dmitry Medvedev in October 2011

- USSR State Prize (1977), for her role in the film The Flight of Mr. McKinley
- People's Artist of the RSFSR (1984)
- The Stanislavsky award (1993)
- Order of Friendship (1997), for "services to the State and significant contribution to strengthening friendship and cooperation between peoples, many years of fruitful activity in the arts and culture"
- The President of the Russian Federation's Prize for outstanding contribution to Arts and literature in 2000 (25 April 2001)
- Nika Award, the Golden Eagle Award (2005) for her role in Kira Muratova's The Tuner
- Order of Merit for the Fatherland
  - 4th class (2007), for "contribution to the development of the national culture and Arts, and creative longevity"
  - 3rd class (2011), for "contribution to the development of domestic theatrical and cinematic arts, and creative longevity"
- The "Idol" Award (2009), "For high service to the Art"
- The Russian of the Year National award (2011)
