= Yuri Ardashev =

Russian theatre director (born 1965)

- Born: 22 January 1965; Kirov, Russian SFSR, Soviet Union
- Occupation: Theatre director

Yuri Alexeyevich Ardashev (Russian: Юрий Алексеевич Ардашев; born 22 January 1965) is a Russian theatre director, actor, and professional drummer. Opera La voix humaine by Francis Poulenc, directed by Yuri Ardashev, became the nominee of the national award "Golden Mask" (2009) in the categories "Best Performance", "Best Actress".

== Biography ==
Yuri Ardashev studied at the Kirov Academy of Arts and the State musical college named after Gnessins on Percussion instruments. He graduated from the Gerasimov Institute of Cinematography (studio Vladimir Naumov) and Russian Academy of Theatre Arts (Master Yuri Lyubimov), specializing in directing.

He worked in TV's Companies Star Plus, Grand TV (Vyatka), filmed commercials and documentaries, worked as an actor and assistant director at the Taganka Theatre. As assistant attended by the director Yuri Lyubimov of performances:

- "Suf(f)le" on the works of Friedrich Nietzsche, Franz Kafka, Samuel Beckett, James Joyce
- "Go and stop progress (Oberiu)" on the works of Alexander Vvedensky, Daniil Kharms, Nikolay Zabolotsky, Aleksei Kruchenykh, N. Oleynikov
- Before and After" Bricolage on the works of poets of the Silver Age of Russian Poetry.

Since January 2011 working at the State Russian Drama Theater named by Bestuzhev.

== Work in film ==
- Past i present
- Medicines for Termintor (2003)
- Reflection. Thieves in Law (2006)
- Boris Grebenshchikov. Teleportation in Vyatka
- Yuri Lyubimov. Portraits of Age
- Reflection. Advergames (2004)

== Works in the theater ==
- Three Sisters
- King Lear. Pause Theatre "GITIS"
- Jerry Bock, D. Ogayn Fiddler on the Roof. Taganka Theater
- Francis Poulenc La voix humaine Moscow International House of Music, Theatre hall
- Hans Christian Andersen The Snow Queen State Cultural Center and Museum by Vysotsky
- V. Rozov, Finding Joy. State Youth Theater of Altai in city Barnaul.
- A. Zaytsevsky "Miracle Bell. State Russian Drama Theatre named after Bestuzhev in city Ulan-Ude

== Actor's work in Taganka Theatre ==
- The Brothers Karamazov (Skotoprigonevsk) by Fyodor Dostoyevsky. Directed by Yuri Lyubimov – Gregory
- The Castle by Franz Kafka. Directed by Yuri Lyubimov – Mom
- Marat/Sade by Peter Weiss. Directed by Yuri Lyubimov – Nurse
- Woe from Wit – Woe to mind – Woe to Wit by Aleksandr Griboyedov. Directed by Yuri Lyubimov – Platon Mikhailovich Gorichev
- Antigone by Sophocles – Jester
- Theatrical Novel by Mikhail Bulgakov. Directed by Yuri Lyubimov – Bust Ostrowski, Janitor
- Fiddler on the Roof by Jerry Bock (small stage). Directed by Yuri Ardashev – Sergeant

== Nominations and awards ==
- Award of "binoculars" for the most interesting theatrical experiment of 1999 – Three Sisters
- International Film Festival grand prize DetectiveFEST "Law and Society" – Reflection. Thieves in Law (2006)
- Prize for best director at the Independent Television Festival – Boris Grebenshchikov. Teleportation in Vyatka
- Prize for best director, original theatrical festival in Moscow university "Student Spring" – King Lear. Pause
- Francis Poulenc La voix humaine – nominated for National Award "Golden Mask" (2009) in the category "Best Performance".
