= The Sixth of July =

1968 Soviet drama film

- Russian: Шестое июля
- Directed by: Yuli Karasik
- Written by: Mikhail Shatrov
- Starring: Vasiliy Lanovoy; Alla Demidova; Heinz Braun; Yuriy Kayurov; Boris Khimichev; Georgiy Kulikov
- Cinematography: Misha Suslov
- Edited by: Mariya Karyova
- Music by: Alfred Schnittke
- Release date: 1968
- Running time: 106 minutes
- Country: Soviet Union
- Language: Russian

The Sixth of July (Russian: Шестое июля) is a 1968 Soviet drama film directed by Yuli Karasik. The film is based on the play with the same name by Mikhail Shatrov which is based on real historical events and is dedicated to the 50th anniversary of the Bolsheviks suppression of the Left SR Uprising, during the Russian Civil War.

== Plot ==
In Russia, there is hunger, devastation and intervention. On 4 July 1918 the Fifth All-Russian Congress of Soviets of Workers, Peasants, Red Army and Cossack Deputies opens in Moscow. In the ranks of the revolutionaries is a split - Left Social Revolutionaries are trying to wrest power from the hands of the Bolsheviks. At the request of the Left Socialist-Revolutionary faction, a representative of the underground Ukrainian peasant congress Aleksandrov addressed the deputies with a fiery speech. He calls on the audience to vote for the rejection of the infamous Brest-Litovsk treaty.

After Lenin's speech, which rejected any war with the German Empire, the congress adopts a Bolshevik resolution approving the activities of the Council of People's Commissars.

On 6 July the Central Committee of the Left Socialist Revolutionary Party gathered for an emergency meeting. To break the treaty, which they saw as counterrevolutionary, a decision was made to physically eliminate the German ambassador Wilhelm von Mirbach.

The assassination of the ambassador signaled the beginning of an uprising. One by one the buildings of the most important city services fall into the hands of the revolutionaries. Dzerzhinski and Latsis were arrested. A message is received from Yaroslavl about a rebellion led by the Socialist Revolutionary Boris Savinkov.

By evening, using their last reserves, the Bolsheviks sent delegates to the labor collectives for mass agitation and organization of the defense of the city. They resolve to counteract the uprising, not with volunteers, but an organized military force.

At dawn, units of the Latvian Riflemen entered the city. Danishevsky, sent for negotiations, completed his mission successfully. After several hours of heavy fighting, the Left Socialist Revolutionary uprising was crushed.

On 9 July 1918, the Fifth All-Russian Congress of Soviets continued its work, now under Bolshevik one-party rule.

== Cast ==
Left Socialist Revolutionaries
- Alla Demidova as Maria Spiridonova
- Ivan Solovyov as Andrei Kolegayev
- Armen Dzhigarkhanyan as Prosh Proshian
- Vyacheslav Shalevich as Yakov Blumkin
- Andrey Kryukov as Boris Kamkov
- Grigory Ostrin as Donat Cherepanov
- Alexander Yanvarev as Dmitry Ivanovich Popov
- Leonid Yevtifiev as Nikolay Andreev
- Yuri Nazarov as Vyacheslav Aleksandrovich
- Sergey Plotnikov as Alexander Aleksandrov

Germans

- Nikolay Volkov as Wilhelm von Mirbach
- Heinz Braun as an advisor to the German Embassy
- Boris Khimichev as an advisor to the German Embassy

Bolsheviks

- Yuriy Kayurov as Lenin
- Vladimir Gorelov as Nikolai Gorbunov
- Rodion Alexandrov - Anatoly Lunacharsky
- Gennady Barkov as Yuriy Sablin
- Vasiliy Lanovoy as Felix Dzerzhinski
- Oleg Mokshantsev as Jēkabs Peterss
- Uldis Putitsis as Martin Latsis
- Alexander Shirvindt as Leo Karakhan
- Vladimir Tatosov as Sverdlov
- Georgy Kulikov as Vladimir Bonch-Bruyevich
- Vladimir Samoilov as Nikolai Podvoisky
- Leonid Markov as Alexander Tsiurupa
- Juris Plyavins as Jūlijs Daniševskis
- Hari Liepins as Jukums Vācietis
- Roman Khomyatov as Mikhail Frunze
- Nina Veselovskaya as Inessa Armand
- Boris Ryzhukhin as Georgy Chicherin (as B. Ryzhukhin)

== See also ==
- Left Socialist Revolutionary Party
- Left SR Uprising
- Left-wing uprisings against the Bolsheviks
