= All the King's Men =

1946 novel by Robert Penn Warren

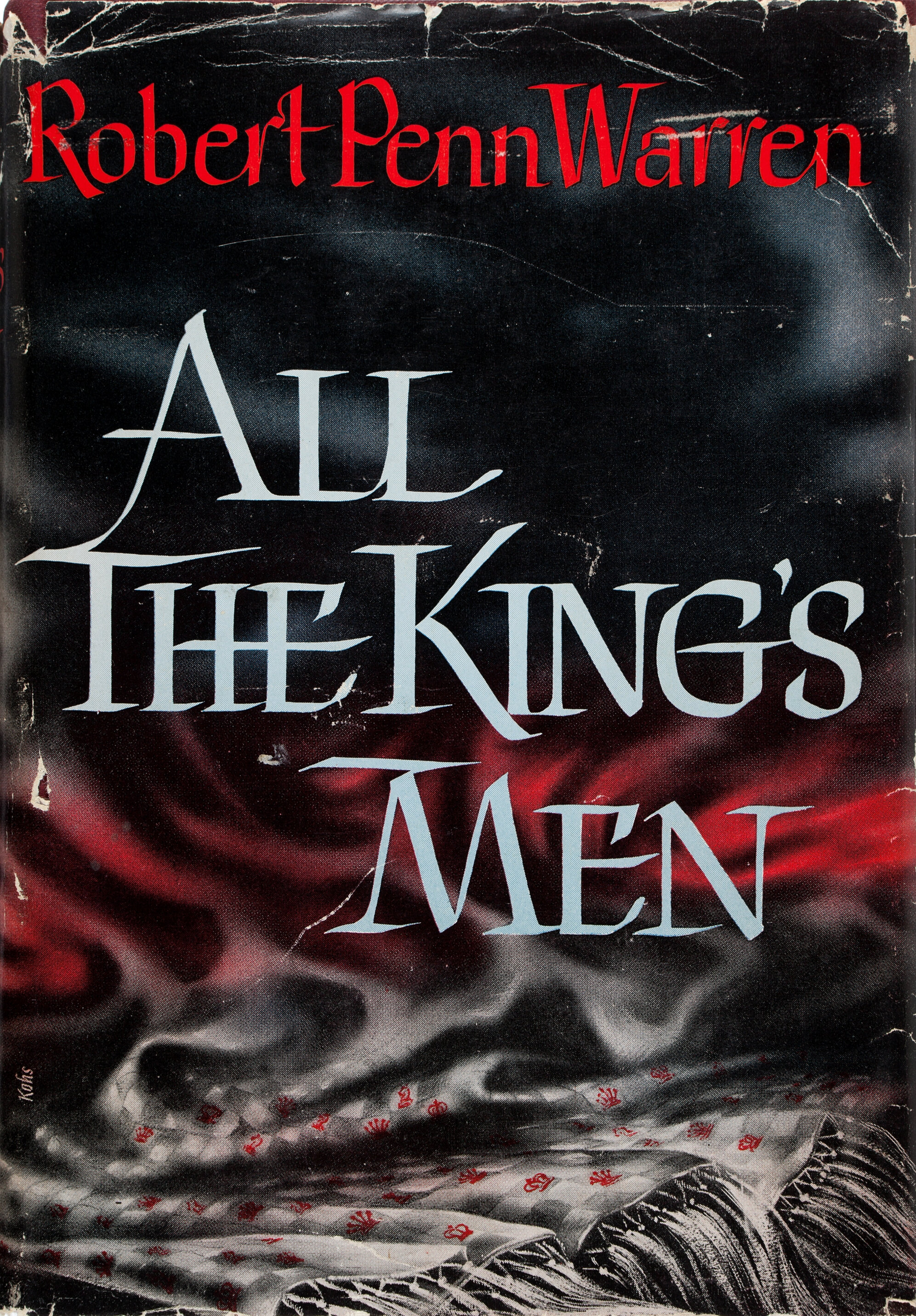
- First edition
- Author: Robert Penn Warren
- Language: English
- Genre: Political fiction
- Publisher: Harcourt, Brace & Company
- Publication date: 1946
- Publication place: United States
- Media type: Print (hardcover, paperback)
- Pages: 464 pp (hardcover 1st edition)

All the King's Men is a 1946 novel by Robert Penn Warren. The novel tells the story of charismatic populist governor Willie Stark and his political machinations in the Depression-era Deep South. It was inspired by the real-life story of U.S. Senator and Louisiana Governor Huey P. Long, who was assassinated in 1935. Its title is drawn from the nursery rhyme "Humpty Dumpty."

Warren won the Pulitzer Prize for All the King's Men in 1947. It was later adapted into two films of the same name, in 1949 and 2006; the 1949 version won the Academy Award for Best Picture. The novel has received critical acclaim and remained perennially popular since its first publication. It was rated the 36th greatest novel of the 20th century by Modern Library, and it was chosen as one of Time magazine's 100 best novels since 1923.

All the King's Men portrays the dramatic and theatrical political rise and governorship of Willie Stark, an idealistic but underhanded populist in the 1930s American South. The novel is narrated by Jack Burden, a political reporter who comes to work as Governor Stark's right-hand man. The trajectory of Stark's career is interwoven with Jack Burden's life story and philosophical reflections: "the story of Willie Stark and the story of Jack Burden are, in one sense, one story."

The novel evolved from a verse play that Warren began writing in 1936 entitled Proud Flesh. One of the characters in Proud Flesh was named Willie Talos, in reference to the brutal character Talus in Edmund Spenser's late 16th-century epic poem The Faerie Queene.

A 2002 version of All the King's Men, re-edited by Noel Polk, keeps the name "Willie Talos" for the Boss as originally written in Warren's manuscript, and is known as the "restored edition" for using this name as well as printing several passages removed from the original edit.

Warren claimed that All the King's Men was "never intended to be a book about politics."

== Themes and imagery ==
A central motif of the novel is that all actions have consequences and that it is impossible for an individual to stand aloof and be a mere observer of life, as Jack tries to do (first as a graduate student doing historical research and later as a wisecracking newspaperman). In the atmosphere of the 1930s, the whole population seemed to abandon responsibility by living vicariously through messianic political figures like Willie Stark. Thus, Stark fulfills the wishes of many of the characters, or seems to do so. For instance, his faithful bodyguard Sugar-Boy, who stutters, loves Stark because "the b-boss could t-talk so good", and Jack Burden cannot bring himself to sleep with Anne Stanton, whom he loves, although Stark does so. It is in that sense that the characters are "all the king's men", a line taken from the poem Humpty Dumpty (Warren biographer Joseph Blotner also notes, "Like Humpty Dumpty, each of the major characters has experienced a fall of some kind"). The title is derived from the motto of Huey P. Long, whose life was similar to that of Willie Stark, "Every Man a King", but that vicarious achievement will eventually fail. Jack ultimately realizes that one must "go out of history into history and the awful responsibility of Time".

The "Great Twitch" is a particular brand of nihilism that Jack embraces during his journey westward: "all the words we speak meant nothing and there was only the pulse in the blood and the twitch of the nerve, like a dead frog's leg in the experiment when the electric current goes through." On his way back from California, Jack gives a ride to an old man who has an involuntary facial twitch. This image becomes for him the encapsulating metaphor for the idea that "all life is but the dark heave of blood and the twitch of the nerve."

Subsequent events (including the tragic deaths of Governor Stark, Jack's lifelong friend Adam Stanton, and Judge Irwin, Jack's father) convince Jack that the revelation of the "Great Twitch" is an insufficient paradigm to explain what he has seen of history. "[H]e saw that though doomed, [his friends] had nothing to do with any doom under the godhead of the Great Twitch. They were doomed, but they lived in the agony of will."

== Characters ==
=== Willie Stark ===
The central character of Willie Stark, originally called Willie Talos (often simply referred to as "the Boss") undergoes a radical transformation from an idealistic lawyer and weak gubernatorial candidate into a charismatic and extraordinarily powerful governor. In achieving this office Stark comes to embrace various forms of corruption and builds an enormous political machine based on patronage and intimidation. His approach to politics earns him many enemies in the state legislature, but does not detract from his popular appeal among many of his constituents, who respond with enthusiasm to his fiery populist manner.

Stark's character was inspired by the life of Huey P. Long, former governor of Louisiana and that state's U.S. senator in the mid-1930s. Huey Long was at the zenith of his career when he was assassinated in 1935; just a year earlier, Robert Penn Warren had begun teaching at Louisiana State University. Stark, like Long, is shot to death in the state capitol building by a physician. The title of the book possibly came from Long's motto, "Every Man a King" or his nickname, Kingfish. In his introduction to the Modern Library edition, Warren denied that the book should be read as either praise for Huey Long or praise for his assassination:

One of the unfortunate characteristics of our time is that the reception of a novel may depend on its journalistic relevance. It is a little graceless of me to call this characteristic unfortunate, and to quarrel with it, for certainly the journalistic relevance of All the King's Men had a good deal to do with what interest it evoked. My politician hero, whose name, in the end, was Willie Stark, was quickly equated with the late Senator Huey P. Long. ...

This equation led, in different quarters, to quite contradictory interpretations of the novel. On one hand, there were those who took the thing to be a not-so-covert biography of, and apologia for, Senator Long, and the author to be not less than a base minion of the great man. There is really nothing to reply to this innocent boneheadedness or gospel-bit hysteria. As Louis Armstrong is reported to have said, there's some folks that, if they don't know, you can't tell 'em ... But on the other hand, there were those who took the thing to be a rousing declaration of democratic principles and a tract for the assassination of dictators. This view, though somewhat more congenial to my personal political views, was almost as wide of the mark. For better or worse, Willie Stark was not Huey Long. Willie [Stark] was only himself. ...

[T]he difference between the person Huey P. Long and the fiction Willie Stark, may be indicated by the fact that in the verse play [Proud Flesh] the name of the politician was Talos – the name of the brutal, blank-eyed 'iron groom' of Spenser's Fairie Queene, the pitiless servant of the knight of justice. My conception grew wider, but that element always remained, and Willie Stark remained, in one way, Willie Talos. In other words, Talos is the kind of doom that democracy may invite upon itself. The book, however, was never intended to be a book about politics. Politics merely provided the framework story in which the deeper concerns, whatever their final significance, might work themselves out.

=== Jack Burden ===
Jack Burden is the novel's narrator, a former student of history, newspaper columnist, and personal aide to Governor Willie Stark.

His narrative is propelled in part by a fascination with the mystery of Stark's larger-than-life character, and equally by his struggle to discover some underlying principle to make sense of all that has happened. In narrating the story, Jack commingles his own personal story with the political story of Governor Stark.

=== Anne Stanton ===
Anne is Jack Burden's childhood sweetheart and the daughter of Willie Stark's political predecessor, Governor Stanton. Many of the novel's passages recounting Jack's life story revolve around memories of his relationship with Anne. Like many of Jack's friends, Anne disapproves of Willie Stark. Anne reveres her father. Jack's research into Judge Irwin's past unearths a time that Governor Stanton behaved corruptly. Anne is devastated to learn this. In the wake of her turmoil, she begins an affair with Stark.

=== Adam Stanton ===
Adam is a highly successful doctor, Anne Stanton's brother, and Jack Burden's childhood friend. Jack comes to view Adam Stanton as the polar opposite of Governor Stark, calling Adam "the man of idea" and Stark "the man of fact". Elsewhere, he describes Adam's central motivation as a deep need to "do good". Governor Stark invites Adam to be director of his pet project, a new hospital and medical center. The position initially strikes Adam as repugnant because of his revulsion to Stark's politics, but Jack and Anne ultimately persuade him to accept the invitation, essentially by removing his moral high ground. Adam's sense of violation as a result of his entanglement with Governor Stark proves violently tragic when he is informed by Lieutenant Governor Tiny Duffy that Stark has been sleeping with his sister. Adam tells Anne, "he wouldn't be paid pimp to his sister's whore". His pride demolished, Adam finds the Governor at the Capitol building and shoots him.

=== Judge Irwin ===
Judge Irwin is an elderly gentleman whom Jack has known since childhood, a man who is essentially a father figure to him. Willie Stark assigns Jack the task of digging through Irwin's past to find something with which Irwin can be blackmailed. Jack investigates thoroughly and finds what he is looking for: an incident many years ago when Judge Irwin took a bribe to dismiss a lawsuit against a fuel company, resulting in the personal destruction of a man named Mortimer Littlepaugh. Jack presents the incriminating evidence to Irwin, and before he has a chance to use it against him, Irwin commits suicide. Only at this point does Jack learn from his mother that Irwin was his father.

=== Cass Mastern ===
One of Jack Burden's first major historical research projects revolves around the life of a 19th-century collateral ancestor, Cass Mastern, a man of high moral standards and a student at Transylvania College in Kentucky. Cass's story, as revealed through his journals and letters, is essentially about a single betrayal of a friend that seems to ripple endlessly outward with negative consequences for many people. In studying this fragment of Civil War–era history, Jack begins to suspect (but cannot yet bring himself to accept) the idea that every event has unforeseen and unknowable implications, and that all actions and all persons are connected to other actions and other persons. Jack suggests that one reason he is unable to complete his dissertation on Cass's life is that perhaps "he was afraid to understand for what might be understood there was a reproach to him."

== Adaptations ==
Besides the early verse play version Proud Flesh, Robert Penn Warren wrote several stage adaptations of All the King's Men, one of them in close collaboration with famous German theatre director Erwin Piscator in 1947.

The story was adapted for radio by NBC University Theatre and broadcast in January 1949. Wayne Morris played Jack Burden, with Paul Frees as Willie Stark.

All the King's Men, a movie made based on Warren's novel, was released several months later in 1949. The film won three Oscars that year: Best Picture, Best Actor (Broderick Crawford), and Best Supporting Actress (Mercedes McCambridge). The movie was also nominated for four more categories. In 2001, the United States Library of Congress deemed the film "culturally significant", and selected it for preservation in the National Film Registry. It is noted, however, for deviating significantly from the novel's storyline.

NBC network's Kraft Television Theatre broadcast a television version of All the King's Men in May 1958. This adaptation was directed by Sidney Lumet and starred Neville Brand as Willie Stark.

A Soviet TV adaptation titled Vsya Korolevskaya Rat was produced in 1971 by Byelorussian TV. It starred Georgiy Zhzhonov (Willie Stark), Mikhail Kozakov (Jack Burden), Alla Demidova (Anne), Oleg Yefremov (Adam), Rostislav Plyatt (Irwin), Lev Durov (Sugar Boy). Initially Pavel Luspekayev starred as Willie Stark, but he was gravely ill at that time and died of aortic dissection only after 30% of filming was completed, thus the movie director asked Georgiy Zhzhonov to substitute the vacated role.

American composer Carlisle Floyd adapted the novel as a full-length grand opera entitled Willie Stark, commissioned and premiered by the Houston Grand Opera in 1981.

Adrian Hall adapted and directed a stage version of the novel at Trinity Repertory Company in Providence, Rhode Island in April 1987. This adaptation has been staged at Trinity and other theater companies in the years since.

Another film version was produced in 2006 by writer/director Steven Zaillian, who wanted to more faithfully follow Warren's version of the story than the original film did. However, it was a critical and commercial disappointment.

== Critical reception ==
Contemporary response to the novel was largely positive.

Writing in the New Republic, George Mayberry wrote that the novel was "in the tradition of many classics", comparing the novel favorably with Moby-Dick, The Sun Also Rises, and The Great Gatsby. "The single quality that encompasses these varied books", he wrote, "is the use of the full resources of the American language to record with imagination and intelligence a significant aspect of our life." He ended the review saying, "All together it is the finest American novel in more years than one would like to have to remember."

External videos
- Panel discussion on All the King's Men at Louisiana State University, November 12, 2001, C-SPAN

The New York Times Book Review's Orville Prescott praised the book's energy, writing that "[i]t isn't a great novel or a completely finished work of art. It is as bumpy and uneven as a corduroy road, somewhat irresolute and confused in its approach to vital problems and not always convincing. Nevertheless, Robert Penn Warren's All the King's Men is magnificently vital reading, a book so charged with dramatic tension it almost crackles with blue sparks, a book so drenched with fierce emotion, narrative pace and poetic imagery that its stature as a 'readin' book', as some of its characters would call it, dwarfs that of most current publications."

Despite the positive reviews, in 1974, All the King's Men was challenged at the Dallas, Texas, Independent School District high school libraries for depicting a "depressing view of life" and "immoral situations".

== Awards ==
Robert Penn Warren's novel was the winner of the 1947 Pulitzer Prize.

== See also ==
- All the President's Men
- Politics in fiction
- All the Shah's Men
