= Angel Wagenstein =

Bulgarian screenwriter and author (1922–2023)

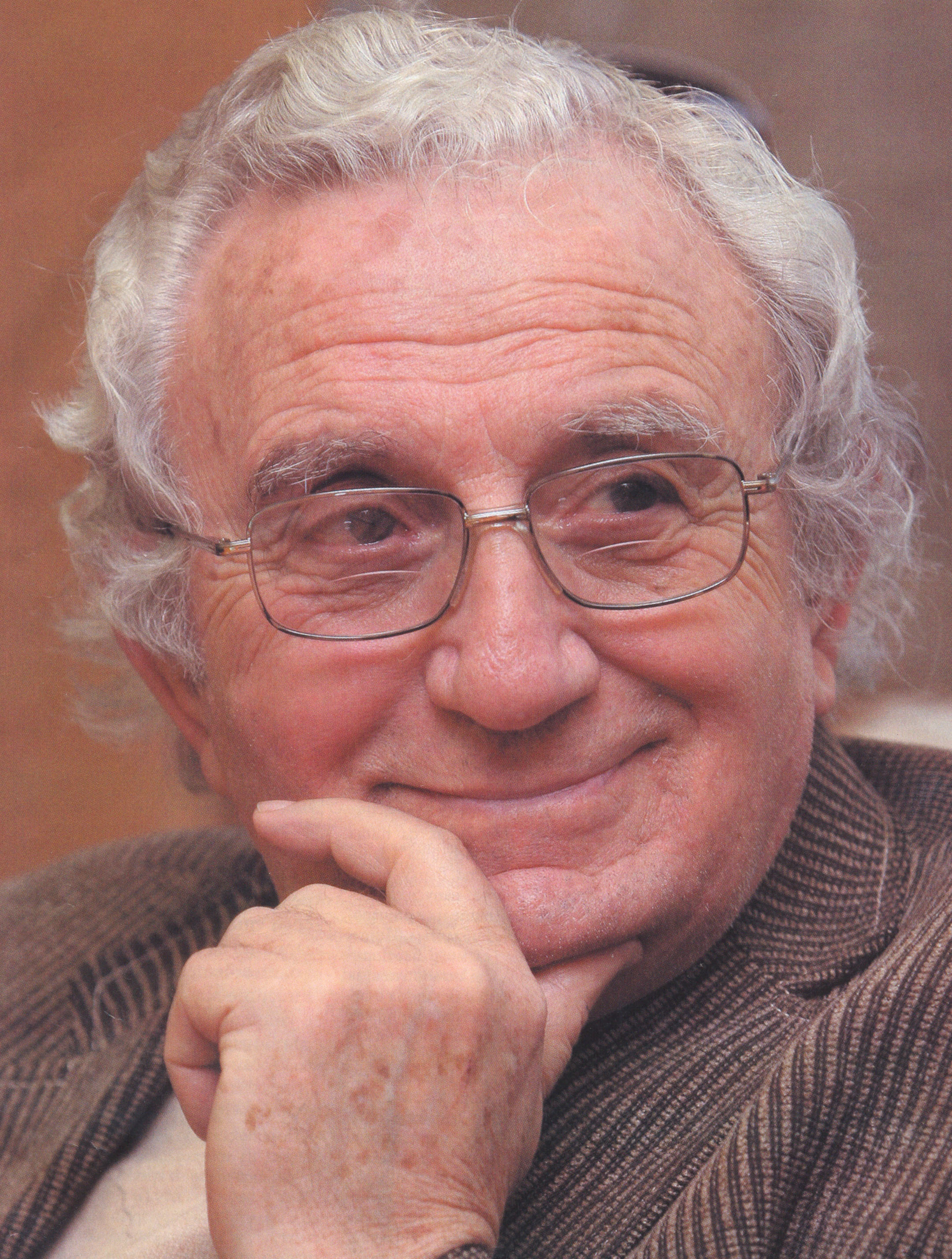
- Born: Angel Raymond Wagenstein; 17 October 1922; Plovdiv, Bulgaria
- Died: 29 June 2023 (aged 100); Sofia, Bulgaria
- Occupations: Screenwriter; Author

Angel Raymond Wagenstein (Bulgarian: Анжел Раймонд Вагенщайн; 17 October 1922 – 29 June 2023) was a Bulgarian screenwriter and author. He was the author of over fifty screenplays for films, documentaries and cartoons and is most known for his movies about Bulgarian Communists.

His 1959 film, Stars, was awarded the Special Jury Prize at the 1959 Cannes Film Festival. His novel, Far from Toledo, was awarded the Sorbonne's Alberto Benveniste annual prize in 2002, while the novel Farewell Shanghai received the Jean Monnet Prize for European literature in 2004.

Wagenstein was made a knight chevalier of the French Order of Merit and awarded Bulgaria's highest honour, the Stara Planina Order. A documentary about his life, Angel Wagenstein: Art Is a Weapon, was produced by American director Andrea Simon in 2017 and won the Audience Award at the South East European Film Festival.

== Early life ==
Wagenstein was born in Plovdiv, Bulgaria in 1922, but spent his childhood in France where his Jewish family emigrated for political reasons due to their leftist politics. Angel Wagenstein returned to Bulgaria due to an amnesty, and as a student at a lyceum, where he joined an anti-fascist group.

He was interned in a labour camp for Jews in Macedonia, but escaped from it. After a combat mission, he was arrested and condemned to death in 1944, but the execution was first delayed – by the Anglo-American bombing of Sofia, which destroyed parts of the prison and forced the relocation of the inmates to another facility – and then prevented by the anti-fascist (mostly Communist) takeover and the roughly simultaneous invasion of the Soviet Red Army.

After completing a degree in 1950 in film screenwriting at the S. A. Gerasimov All-Union State Institute for Cinematography in Moscow, he worked as a screenplay writer for the Bulgarian Cinematography Center and for the DEFA Film Studio (the former East Germany Cinematography Center).

== Career ==
Wagenstein was the author of over fifty screenplays for films, documentaries and cartoons. He became famous with his movies about Bulgarian Communists, especially partisans.

His film Stars, shot in 1959 by German director Konrad Wolf, was awarded the Special Jury Prize at the 1959 Cannes Film Festival. In 1980, he was a member of the jury at the 30th Berlin International Film Festival.

His fiction includes the triptych Isaac's Torah, Far from Toledo, and Farewell, Shanghai, which have been published both separately and together in various languages. The novels explore Jewish identity, memory, and survival. Far from Toledo was awarded in 2002 the Alberto Benveniste annual prize of the Sorbonne, while his Farewell Shanghai received the Jean Monnet Prize of European literature in 2004.

== Awards and honours ==
The French government awarded Angel Wagenstein the high distinction of Chevalier of the French Order of Merit, and later Chevalier of Arts and Literature. He is also been awarded Bulgaria's highest distinction, the Stara Planina Order.

In 2009, he was made honorary citizen of the city of Plovdiv.

A documentary film about his life, Angel Wagenstein: Art Is a Weapon, was produced by American director Andrea Simon in 2017 and won the Audience Award at the South East European Film Festival. The East German movie Eolomea is based on one of his works.

== Personal life and death ==
Wagenstein was married to Zora, with whom he had two sons, Raymond and Plamen. He turned 100 in October 2022, and died on 29 June 2023.

== Prizes and nominations ==
"Farewell, Shanghai"

- Jean Monnet Prize of European literature 2004
- Shortlisted for VICK 2004 annual prize
- Nomination for the international literary prize of Haus der Kulturen in Berlin

"Isaac's Torah"

- Hristo Botev annual prize 1998
- Adei Wizo Literary Prize 2010

"Far from Toledo"

- Bulgarian Writers Association annual prize 2002
- “Alberto Benveniste Prize” for Sepharade literature 2003

== Selected filmography ==
- Two Victories (dir. Borislav Sharaliev, 1956)
- Stars (dir. Konrad Wolf, 1959)
- Two Under the Sky (dir. Borislav Sharaliev, 1962)
- The Story of a Murder (dir. Joachim Hasler, 1965) — based on the novel Die Jünger Jesu by Leonhard Frank)
- The Little Prince (dir. Konrad Wolf, 1966, TV film) — based on The Little Prince by Antoine de Saint-Exupéry
- Heimlichkeiten (dir. Wolfgang Staudte, 1968)
- Aesop (dir. Rangel Valchanov, 1970)
- Goya or the Hard Way to Enlightenment (dir. Konrad Wolf, 1971) — based on a novel by Lion Feuchtwanger
- Eolomea (dir. Herrmann Zschoche, 1972)
- Dopalnenie kam zakona za zashtita na darzhavata (dir. Ludmil Staikov, 1976)
- Stars in Her Hair, Tears in Her Eyes (dir. Ivan Nitchev, 1977)
- Boris I (dir. Borislav Sharaliev, 1985)
- Bordello (dir. Nikos Koundouros, 1985)
- Coasts in the Mist (dir. Yuli Karasik, 1986)
- Shanghai 1937 (dir. Peter Patzak, 1997, TV film) — based on a novel by Vicki Baum
- After the End of the World (dir. Ivan Nitchev, 1998)
