= Yuri Lyubimov =

Soviet and Russian stage actor and director

- Юрий Любимов
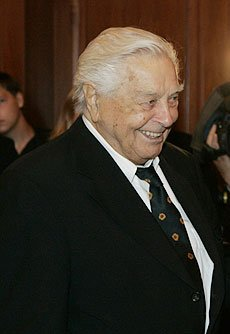
- Lyubimov in 2007
- Born: Yuri Petrovich Lyubimov; 30 September 1917; Yaroslavl, Russian Republic
- Died: 5 October 2014 (aged 97); Moscow, Russia
- Occupations: Stage actor, theatre director
- Years active: 1935–2014
- Spouse: Katalin Lyubimova (1978-2014)
- Awards: Order "For Merit to the Fatherland" (Russia,2nd class); Order "For Merit to the Fatherland" (3rt class); Order "For Merit to the Fatherland" (4th class); Order of the Rising Sun (Japan,4th Class); Order of the Star of Italian Solidarity (Grand Officer); Ordre des Arts et des Lettres (France, Commandeur); Order of the Polar Star (Sweden, Commandeur); Order of Merit of the Republic of Poland (Knight's Cross); Order of the Lion of Finland (Commander); Order of Merit of the Federal Republic of Germany (Officer); Order of the Red Banner of Labour (USSR); State Prize of the Russian Federation; Stalin Prize (USSR); EU: Europe Theatre Prize - Special Prize, 2011
- Website: www.lyubimov.info (archived)

Yuri Petrovich Lyubimov (Russian: Ю́рий Петро́вич Люби́мов; 30 September [O.S. 17 September] 1917 – 5 October 2014) was a Soviet and Russian stage actor and director associated with the internationally renowned Taganka Theatre, which he founded in 1964. He was one of the leading names in the Russian theatre world.

== Life and career ==
Lyubimov was born in Yaroslavl in 1917. His grandfather was a kulak who fled to Moscow to escape arrest during the collectivisation. Lyubimov's father, Pyotr Zakharovich, was a merchant, who worked for a Scottish company, and his mother, Anna Alexandrovna, was a half-Russian and half-Gypsy schoolteacher. They moved to Moscow in 1922, where both were arrested. Lyubimov studied at the Institute for Energy in Moscow.

He was a member of Mikhail Chekhov's Second Moscow Art Theater from 1934 to 1936. During the 1930s, he also met Vsevolod Meyerhold, the avant-garde director. Lyubimov worked in the Song and Dance Ensemble of the NKVD, where he met and befriended Dmitri Shostakovich, Nikolai Erdman and many others.

After service in the Red Army during World War II, Lyubimov joined the Vakhtangov Theatre (founded by Yevgeny Vakhtangov). In 1953, he received the USSR State Prize. Lyubimov started teaching in 1963 and formed the Taganka Theatre the following year. His celebrated production of Bertold Brecht's The Good Person of Setzuan with Anna Orochko's class at the Schukin Theatre Institute earned him the artistic directorship of the Taganka Theatre. With Meyerhold, Stanislavsky, Vakhtangov and Brecht as his spiritual guides, Lyubimov eschewed Soviet drama for the more imaginative worlds of poetry and narrative fiction, which he dramatized, and the classics, which he broke apart, reconstituted and presented from a pronounced critical perspective. Under Lyubimov, the theatre rose to become the most popular in Moscow, with Vladimir Vysotsky and Alla Demidova as the leading actors. In 1971 Shakespeare's Hamlet became one of Lyubimov's highly successful and much acclaimed productions. In 1976 he was awarded by the BITEF First Prize for Hamlet.

In 1975 he directed the original production of Al gran sole carico d'amore by Luigi Nono at the Teatro alla Scala (Nono himself and Lyubimov wrote the libretto).

Long a Soviet underground classic, Mikhail Bulgakov's novel The Master and Margarita was finally brought to the Russian stage at the Taganka in 1977, in an adaptation by Lyubimov.

According to B. Beumers, the major innovations Lyubimov brought to theatrical history are the creation of a new theatrical genre, the poetic theatre, in which all revolves around one metaphor, and the creation of a new form of dramatic material, which incorporates a historical and biographical context. Lyubimov's performances — including the well-known Antiworlds, Pugachev, Listen!, and Comrade, believe, as well as newer Before and After, Oberiuty, and Honey — were fed and filled with poetic energy. In another performance, Fallen and Living, Yuri Lyubimov and David Samoilov built on verses by Pavel Kogan, Semyon Gudzenko and other poets of the World War II generation.

After Vysotsky's death in 1980, all of Lyubimov's productions were banned by the Communist authorities. In 1984, he was stripped of Soviet citizenship. Thereupon he worked abroad before returning to the Taganka Theatre in 1989. His staging of Eugene Onegin premiered in the Taganka on his 85th birthday to much critical acclaim.

While in the West he maintained a busy directing career. In the United States he directed Crime and Punishment at Arena Stage and Lulu at the Lyric Opera of Chicago. In 1983 he directed Crime and Punishment in London, winning the Evening Standard Award for Best Director, in 1985 he directed St Matthew Passion at La Scala. His effort to re-stage his famous The Master and Margarita at the American Repertory Theater failed to materialize because of a disagreement with the management of that company. In 1989, his Russian citizenship was restored.

In June 2011, before a performance of Bertolt Brecht's play The Good Person of Szechwan in Czech, the actors of Taganka refused to rehearse unless they were paid first. Lyubimov paid the money and left the theatre. "I've had enough of this disgrace, these humiliations, this lack of desire to work, this desire just for money", he said. Lyubimov retired from the theatre the following week. Two leading actors of theatre, Dmitry Mezhevich and Alla Smirdan, as well as some administrative assistants, followed Lyubimov. His dramatization of Dostoevsky's Demons premiered the next year.

In June 2013 Lyubimov staged Alexander Borodin's opera Prince Igor at the Bolshoi Theatre, which was warmly received by audiences and critics. The new Prince Igor is shorter, with Lyubimov cutting out some parts of the opera. According to Vassily Sinaisky, the Bolshoi chief conductor, such a new structure of the opera was conceived to make it more dynamic and intense.

Lyubimov staged over 100 dramas and operas. "People tried to stick me with the label of political theater. But that's wrong. I was engaged in an aesthetic, in the expansion of the palette — what shades could be added in working with space and style," he says. Leonardo Shapiro concludes that "Lyubimov is probably best known for his daring theatrical adaptations of poetry and novels and his successful (and sometimes unsuccessful) run-ins with Soviet Premiers and Ministers of Culture over forbidden material."

As an actor, he performed in 37 plays and 17 films, and several remain classics.

Vladimir Vysotsky dedicated some of his famous songs (including "It's Not Evening Yet") to Yuri Lyubimov.

Lyubimov, a director who dominated Russian theatre for half a century, died at 97, after being admitted to the Botkin Clinic in Moscow with heart failure.

== Europe Theatre Prize ==
In 2011 he was awarded a Special Prize by the Jury of the XIV Europe Theatre Prize, in Saint Petersburg. The prize organization stated:

There is a Special Prize for figures displaying particular commitment in combining their own cultural and/or political experience at the highest level with the European ideals and those of peace and coexistence between peoples (...) The Jury of the 14th edition unanimously awarded this to the legendary Russian director Yuri Petrovich Lyubimov for his unquestionable artistic stature and the crucial role that he and the Taganka Theatre played in the delicate phase of perestroika marking the transition from the Soviet Union to contemporary Russia.

== Awards ==
- Medal "For the Defence of Leningrad" (1943)
- Medal "For the Defence of Moscow"
- Medal "For the Victory over Germany in the Great Patriotic War 1941–1945"
- Stalin Prize, 2nd class (1952) - for his role in the play Tyatina "Yegor Bulychov and others" by M. Gorky (Theatre Vakhtangov)
- BITEF First Prize for Hamlet (1976)
- First Prize of “Theatrical Meetings in Warsaw” II International Festival, Poland (1980).
- Standard Theatre Award for Best Director for “Crime and Punishment” by F. Dostoevsky (1983)
- Honored Artist of the RSFSR (1954)
- People's Artist of Russia (1991)
- Spectator’s Sympathy Prize of the International Theatrical Festival in Athens (1995)
- Order of Merit for the Fatherland, 3rd class, Russia (16 September 1997) - for his great personal contribution to the development of theatrical art
- State Prize of the Russian Federation (1997).
- Honorary Medal of the President of the Hungarian Republic (1997).
- Grand Prix of the International Festival in Saloniki (1999).
- “Golden Mask” in the nomination “For Honour and Dignity”, Moscow (2000).
- Commander of the Order of Arts and Letters (France, 2002) for outstanding theatrical work
- Grand Officer of the Order of the Star of Italian Solidarity (2003)
- Knight of the Order of the Polar Star (Sweden, 2004)
- Silver Cross of the Order of Merit of the Republic of Poland (2004)
- Order of the Rising Sun, 4th Class, Gold Rays with Rosette, (Japan, 2007)
- Order of Merit for the Fatherland, 2nd class (Russia, 25 September 2007) - for outstanding contribution to the development of theatrical art, and many years of creative activity
- Honorary Member of Russian Academy of Arts
- Jubilee Medal "50 Years of Victory in the Great Patriotic War 1941-1945"
- Medal of Zhukov (1996)
- Europe Theatre Prize - Special Prize by the Jury (2011)

== Selected productions ==
- The Good Person of Setzuan with Boris Khmelnitsky, Zinaida Slavina, Nikolay Gubenko and Inna Ulyanova (1963–64)
- Ten Days that Shook the World (1965)
- Antiworlds (1965)
- Fallen and Living (1965)
- Life of Galileo (1966)
- Listen! (1967)
- Pugachev (1967)
- Alive (1968, banned)
- Tartuffe (1968)
- Rush Hour (1969)
- The Mother (1969)
- What Is to Be Done? with Leonid Filatov (1970)
- Hamlet with Vladimir Visotsky (1971)
- And Here the Dawns are Silent, with Natalya Sayko, Maria Politseymako and Vitaly Shapovalov (1971)
- Comrade, believe (1973)
- Wooden Horses (1974)
- Al gran sole carico d'amore (1975)
- The Master and Margarita with Ivan Dykhovichny, Veniamin Smekhov and Semyon Farada (1977)
- The Inspector's Recounting (1978)
- Turandot (1979)
- Boris Godunov (1979)
- The House on the Embankment (1980)
- Vladimir Visotsky (1981)
- The Threepenny Opera (1981)
- Boris Godunov with Vitaly Shapovalov, Ivan Bortnik, Valery Zolotukhin and Yury Belyayev (1982, banned)
- Don Giovanni (1982)
- Crime and Punishment (1983)
- Lulu (1983)
- Rigoletto (1984)
- St Matthew Passion (1985)
- Fidelio (1985)
- A Feast in Time of Plague (1986)
- Salammbô (1986)
- Tannhäuser (1988)
- Das Rheingold (1988)
- The Suicide (1990)
- Lady Macbeth of the Mtsensk District (1990)
- The Love for Three Oranges (1991)
- Electra with Alla Demidova (1992)
- Zhivago (Doctor) with Valery Zolotukhin (1993)
- Jenůfa (1993)
- The Seagull (1993)
- The Cherry Orchard (1995)
- Medea (1995)
- The Queen of Spades (1996)
- The Brothers Karamazov (1997)
- Marat/Sade (1998)
- Sharashka (1998)
- Eugene Onegin (2000)
- Faust (2002)
- Oberiuty (2004)
- Antigone (2006)
- Woe from Wit (2007)
- The Castle (2008)
- Tales (2009)
- Honey (2010)
- Demons (2012)
- Prince Igor (2013)

== Selected filmography ==
- Days and Nights (1944) as Misha Maslennikov
- Duel (1944) as a KGB officer (uncredited)
- A Noisy Household (1946) as Jacques Larochelle
- Robinzon Kruzo (1946) as Friday
- Blue Roads (1947) as Vetkyn
- Boy from the Outskirts (1947) as Kostya Smirnov
- Three Encounters (1948) as Rudnikov
- Michurin (1948) as a translator
- Cossacks of the Kuban (1949) as Andrei
- Farewell, America (1951) as correspondent Blake
- The Composer Glinka (1952) as Alexander Dargomyzhsky
- Belinsky (1953) as a doctor Alexei Frolov
- Behind the Footlights (1956) as Graf Zefirov
- Kain XVIII (1963) as the First Minister
