= The Seagull (1972 film) =

- Directed by: Yuli Karasik
- Written by: Yuli Karasik
- Based on: The Seagull by Anton Chekhov
- Starring: Alla Demidova; Nikolai Plotnikov; Ludmila Savelyeva
- Cinematography: Mikhail Suslov
- Music by: Alfred Schnittke
- Production company: Mosfilm
- Release date: 14 February 1972
- Country: USSR
- Language: Russian

The Seagull (Russian: Чайка, romanized: Chayka) is a 1972 Soviet film adaptation of the 1896 play of the same name by Anton Chekhov. It was directed by Yuli Karasik and its music was written by Alfred Schnittke.

== Plot ==
Beside a lake on his land, Sorin helps his nephew Treplev set up the first production of his play. The main actor is Nina, with whom Treplev is in love. The audience includes celebrities like Treplev's mother, the actress Arkadina, and her lover Boris Trigorin. For Nina and Treplev the show is of major importance, as they both dream of a future in the theatre. However, the audience is distracted and Arkadina talks through it under her breath, accusing the play of being decadent. Feeling humiliated and overlooked, Treplev calls off the play and later drops a dead seagull at Nina's feet, announcing "I will kill myself in the same way". Later Trigorin seduces Nina and confesses to her "A subject is coming to me full of life... that of a short story: a woman lives beside a lake from her childhood... like you. She loves this lake like a seagull, like a seagull she is happy and free. But a man arrives, by chance, and causes her death, just as this seagull died." Shortly afterwards they leave for town and Nina follows. Two years later, we return to the same setting - Treplev still lives there and is now a well-known writer. The audience learns that Nina's love for Trigorin was unrequited and that her acting career was a disappointment.

== Cast ==
- Alla Demidova as Irina Nikolayevna Arkadina, actress
- Vladimir Chetverikov as Konstantin Gavrilovich Treplev, her son
- Nikolai Plotnikov as Pyotr Nikolayevich Sorin
- Ludmila Savelyeva as Nina Mikhailovna Zarechnaya, daughter of a rich landowner
- Armen Dzhigarkhanyan as Ilya Afanasyevich Shamrayev
- Sofia Pavlova as Polina Andreyevna Shamrayeva, his wife
- Valentina Telichkina as Maria Ilyinichna Shamrayeva, his daughter
- Yury Yakovlev as Boris Alekseyevich Trigorin, writer
- Yefim Kopelyan as Yevgeny Sergeyevich Dorn, doctor
- Sergei Torkachevsky as Semyon Semyonovich Medvedenko, teacher
