= Veniamin Smekhov =

Soviet and Russian actor (born 1940)

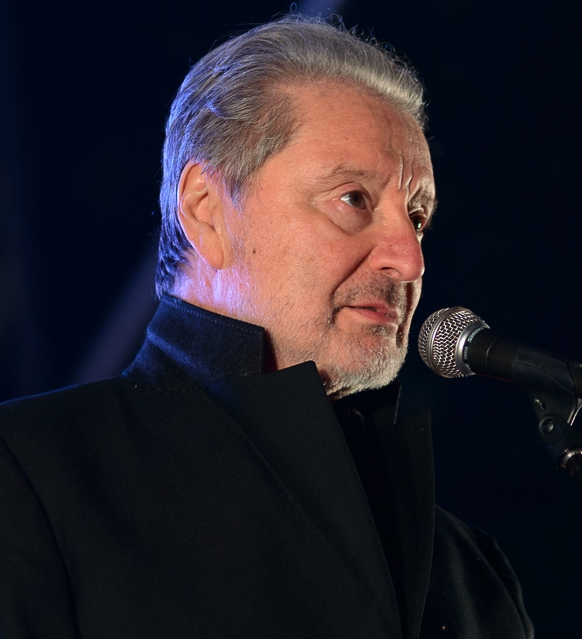
Smekhov in 2017

Veniamin Borisovich Smekhov (Russian: Вениами́н Бори́сович Сме́хов; born 10 August 1940) is a Russian stage and film actor and director. He was the winner of the Petropol Award (2000) as well as the Tsarskoselsky Artistic Prize (2009, 2023). He refused the title of People's Artist of Russia, which was offered to him on his 70th birthday.

Smekhov has long worked in the Moscow Taganka Theatre, where his roles included Woland in a stage adaptation of Mikhail Bulgakov's The Master and Margarita. In film, he is best known for the role of Athos in a Russian version of D'Artagnan and Three Musketeers (1978) and its sequels (1992, 1993). He also has written poetry, scripts and memoirs.

== Biography ==
Smekhov was born on 10 August 1940 in Moscow. His father, Boris Moiseyevich Smekhov (10 January 1912 in Gomel, Belarus – 8 October 2010 in Aachen, Germany), was a Belarusian professor and doctor of economics, and his mother, Maria Lyovna Schwartzburg (1918–1996) was a doctor and head of her medical department in a Moscow clinic. Smekhov spent most of his early life in Moscow. He saw his father for the first time only after he returned in 1945 from serving in the Second World War. From 1947 to 1957, he was a student at School No. 235 on Pal'chikov Lane where he was a part of the Palace of Pioneers drama club. Rolan Bykov worked with the students.

In 1957, Smekhov attended the Boris Shchukin Theatre Institute, the conservatory of the Vakhtangov State Academic Theatre, as well as Vladimir Etush’s class at the Boris Shchukin Theatre Institute, graduating in 1961. He worked for a year at the Kuybiyshev Drama Theatre. In 1962, he joined the Moscow Theatre of Drama and Comedy, later renamed as the Taganka Theatre in 1964 under the direction of Yuri Lyubimov.

In 1985, after Lyubimov was deprived of his Soviet citizenship following an interview with The Times in 1984, and Anatoly Efros replaced him, Smekhov left the theatre for Sovremennik Theatre, returning in 1987.

In 1967, he began working as a freelance television director at Gosteleradio SSSR, the main producer of literary-drama programs. His first work was the teleplay Mayakovsky's Day. It was based on his own script and aired as a part of the Poetic Theatre series. He began work in film in 1968. In 1990, Smekhov began directing theatre performances, operas and made-for-television films in Russia and abroad, and he taught acting for several years in American universities. Smekhov began acting in films in 1968, gaining popularity after playing the role of Athos in the made-for-television film D'Artagnan and Three Musketeers, filmed at the Odesa Film Studio in 1978. He also played Athos in three follow-up films. He has made around 20 solo audio books and a collection of audio book compilations.

In 2011, Smekhov returned to the Taganka Theatre as a guest actor and director. He reprised the role of Woland in Master and Margarita on two occasions. He performed in two poetic performances No Years, which he wrote and directed, and The Spine of the Flute. He has toured with evenings of poetry. Smekhov also makes poetic programs and documentary films for television. He is also the author of several books, including memoirs, poetry and prose.

== Personal life ==
Smekhov shared his first marriage with Alla Smekhova, a radio editor. The couple had two daughters together, including Alika Smekhova (born 1968), an actress and singer. In 1980, he married film and theatre historian and translator Galina Aksenova.

== Filmography ==
=== Acting roles ===
- 1968 Two Comrades Served – Baron Krauze
- 1969 The Air of Sovnarkom – Petrovsky (not credited)
- 1971 Twenty Years Later – Aramis
- 1976 Smoke and the Shorty – Smoke (voiced by Vladimir Ferapontov)
- 1977 Middle of Life – Dennis
- 1979 D'Artagnan and Three Musketeers – Athos
- 1979 I Ask to Accuse Klava K. of My Death – Uncle Seva
- 1983 The Story of Voyages – Local Don Quixote
- 1984 Favorites of the Moon – episode
- 1986 Seven Cries in the Ocean – Baron Porto
- 1988 Puppy – Alexander, journalist for Komsomol'sky Truth
- 1990 Trap For the Single Man – Maksimen
- 1991 Fool – Benjamin Borever
- 1992 Key – Alexander Brown
- 1992 Musketeers Twenty Years Later – Athos
- 1993 The Secret of Queen Anne or Musketeers Thirty Years Later – Athos
- 1993 Breakfast with a View on El'brus – Sumarokov
- 2004 Middle Age, Or All Men Are bas... – Alexander, Sonia's Admirer
- 2007 The Captain's Children – Lev Goreyno
- 2008 Montecristo – Ilia Orlov
- 2008 The Magician Friend Is Flying In – Semen Semenovich
- 2009 The Return of The Musketeers, Or the Treasure of Cardinal Mazarini – Athos
- 2009 Proposed Circumstances – Georgiy Strunin, Director
- 2011 Furtseva – Peter Vladimirovich Boguslavsky
- 2011 Countertrig – Baron von Libenfel's, Olaf's Uncle
- 2012 The Toy Salesman – Ivan Polikarpovich, Professor
- 2013 Finding a Husband In the Big City – Alexander Gordeev, Lisa's Father
- 2014 Spiral – Yakob Arnol'dovich
- 2014 The Frog Princess – Kashcheev
- 2014 Bones – Vitaliy Borisovich Deykevich
- 2016 Mafia: The Game of Survival – Luka Sergeyevich
- 2020 Elsa's Land – Leonid

=== Television productions ===
- 1965 – The Room
- 1965 – Four Friends and the Magic Slippers
- 1969 – Khafiz
- 1971 – Twenty Years Later – Aramis
- 1972 – The Magician from Shiraz – Khafiz (he was also the author of the script and director)
- 1983 – Ali Baba and the Forty Thieves – Mustafa (he was also the author of the script and song lyrics)
- 1983 – Monsieur Lenoir, Who... – Victor Lenoir
- 1984 – The Life and Books of Alexander Green – Visitor, Til's, Bill, Read-Headed Young Man, Guard
- 1984 – Ten Jazz Scenes Based on Macbeth – Macbeth
- 2002 – Willy-Nilly Doctor – Sganarel'
- 2013 – Suicide – reader
- 2016 – Disturber of the Peace – Hussein Guslia

=== Director ===
- 1967 – Mayakovsky's Day (television)
- 1971 – First Songs – Last Songs (television)
- 1972 – Magician from Shiraz (television)
- 1973 – Frederick Moro (television)
- 1982 – Gentlemen from Congress (television)
- 1985 – The Sorochinsky Market (television)
- 2002 – Willy-Nilly Doctor (television)
- 2013 – Movie Star Between the Hammer and Sickle (documentary film about Marina Ladiynina)
- 2013 – Vladimir Tendryakov. A Portrait in the Background of Time (documentary film)
- 2015 – The Last Poet of the Great War (documentary film about Ion Degen)
- 2015 – Boris Zaborov. Searching For Lost Time (documentary film about Boris Zaborov)
- 2016 – Archives. Film 1. Alexander Dovzhenko and Yulia Solntseva
- 2016 – Archives. Film 2. Elem Klimov and Larisa Shepit'ko
