= All the King's Men (1971 film) =

- Вся королевская рать
- Based on: All the King's Men by Robert Penn Warren
- Written by: Aleksandr Gutkovich
- Directed by: Naum Ardashnikov, Aleksandr Gutkovich
- Starring: Georgiy Zhzhonov; Mikhail Kozakov; Oleg Yefremov; Alla Demidova; Rostislav Plyatt
- Music by: Roman Ledenyov
- Country of origin: Soviet Union
- Original language: Russian

Production
- Cinematography: Alfredo Alvarez, Naum Ardashnikov
- Running time: 196 minutes
- Production company: Byelorussian TV

Original release
- Release: 1971

All The King's Men (Russian: Vsya korolevskaya rat', Вся королевская рать) is a 1971 Soviet TV mini-series, adaptation of Robert Penn Warren's 1946 novel of the same name.

== Title ==
The movie's title matches that of the Russian translation of Warren's novel: Вся королевская рать, literally Whole King's Host. Just like in the source material, it's a line from the famous nursery rhyme Humpty Dumpty, translated by Samuil Marshak.

== History ==
Robert Penn Warren's novel, published in Russian in 1968, immediately attracted the attention of the reading public, and the idea of a film adaptation arose in Soviet cinematographic circles. Stanislav Rostotsky from Mosfilm and Alexander Gutkovich from BSSR Gosteleradio applied almost simultaneously to make the adaptation. The personal involvement of Pyotr Masherov, First Secretary of the Central Committee of the Communist Party of Byelorussia, tilted the decision in favor of the Belarusian version.

The film was shot by Belarusian television at a Mosfilm Studio, mostly in Klaipėda and Palanga. After shooting, Gutkovich was suspended from cutting as a result of behind-the-scenes intrigues. Cutting was entrusted instead to Naum Ardashnikov, who worked on the film as director of photography.

The part of Willy Stark became Georgiy Zhzhonov's favorite role. Pavel Luspekayev initially played Willy Stark, although he died after filming only a third of the material. Everything had to be reshot from the beginning. After Luspekaev's death, several actors auditioned for his role, including Sergei Bondarchuk, Armen Dzhigarkhanyan, Andrei Popov, and Oleg Efremov. Mikhail Kozakov, who plays Jack Burden, suggested Georgiy Zhzhonov for the role. Anecdotally, an American consultant was invited to judge the actors' authenticity for the role, and he selected Zhzhonov as having the most suitable appearance to play an American governor.

== Plot ==
Willy Stark is an ambitious and corrupt small-town politician who becomes the governor of a state in the American Southeast. He and his opponents attack each other with blackmail, bribes, and threats. He chooses an unprincipled opportunist named Tiny Duffy, a defector from his political rival, McMurphy, as his lieutenant governor. Stark decides to run for Senate next, but he first needs to compromise one of his most influential opponents, Judge Irwin. Stark assigns his assistant, the reporter Jack Burden, to find dirt on Irwin. Jack is one of the few people in Stark's circle that still has any sense of decency. The judge is an old friend of the Burden family, and a father figure to Jack. He gets to work, sure that the former judge is clean.

In order to build his own popularity, Stark takes the lead on an ambitious project: the construction of an enormous, free regional hospital. Stark invites Jack's childhood friend, the surgeon Dr. Adam Stanton, to run the hospital once it is completed. Stanton finds Stark distasteful, but his behavior doesn't bother the governor as he needs to associate himself with honest and respectable people. Ultimately, Adam accepts Stark's offer.

Meanwhile, Jack uncovers a scandal from Judge Irwin's past: a few years ago, he took a substantial bribe from a large company and was indirectly responsible for a man's death. Eager to give Irwin a chance to explain himself, Jack confronts the judge before he makes the affair public. After hearing Jack out, Irwin commits suicide. Jack's mother reveals that Irwin was his real father.

Hoping to appease his opposition, Stark gives the construction contract for the hospital to the company that finances McMurphy. Tiny Duffy arranges the scheme, but Stark retracts the offer. McMurphy retaliates by publicizing scandalous details about the personal life of Stark Jr., a football star and playboy.

The feud between McMurphy and Stark ends in tragedy: Adam Stanton shoots Stark and is promptly killed by one of Stark's bodyguards. Jack investigates the murder and easily discovers that Tiny Duffy orchestrated the killings. He and Stark's mistress, Sadie Burk, provoked Stanton to murder by convincing him that his sister, Anne, was romantically involved with Stark. As vice-governor, Duffy automatically succeeds the position of governor. Realizing that he shares some of the guilt in the incident, Burden decides not to take any action against Duffy.

=== Differences from the novel ===
The film is set in the 1960s, while the events of the novel unfold from 1922 to 1939. The film omits a number of plot lines from Warren's novel. Willie Stark's transformation from a naïve fighter for the rights of the poor into a cynical populist and demagogue does not appear at all, and, accordingly, Jack's role in this evolution is also omitted. The history of the relationships between Jack, Judge Irwin, Adam and Anna, and the Burden and Stanton families are mostly excluded, with some of their details mentioned only in passing. There is no plot line about Sybil Frey, Tom Stark's girlfriend, or the history of the life of Cass Mastern. The film ends with the final conversation between Jack and Tiny Duffy, and the characters' fates remain offscreen.

== Cast ==
- Mikhail Kozakov, as Jack Burden
- Georgiy Zhzhonov, as Willie Stark
- Rostislav Plyatt, as Judge Irwin
- Tatyana Lavrova, as Sadie Burke
- Alla Demidova, as Anne Stanton
- Oleg Yefremov, as Adam Stanton
- Boris Ivanov, as Tiny Duffy
- Lev Durov, as Sugar Boy
- Anatoli Papanov, as Burden Sr.
- Yevgeniy Yevstigneyev, as Larson
- Aleksandra Klimova, as Mrs. Burden
- Valentina Kalinina, as Lucy Stark
- Valery Khlevinski, as Tom Stark
- Ada Wójcik, as Mrs. Littlepaugh
- Yevgeni Kuznetsov, as Dr. Bland
- Stepan Birillo, as Hugh Miller
- Sergey Tseits, as Byram White
