= Mikhail Shatrov =

Soviet playwright (1932–2010)

- Born: Mikhail Marshak; April 3, 1932; Moscow, Soviet Union
- Died: May 24, 2010 (aged 78); Moscow, Russia
- Resting place: Troyekurovskoye Cemetery
- Education: Moscow State Mining University
- Occupation: Playwright
- Relatives: Alexei Rykov (uncle-in-law); Samuil Marshak (cousin)

Mikhail Filippovich Shatrov (1932–2010) was a Soviet playwright. In 1958 he was admitted to the Union of Soviet Writers. He was a member of the CPSU since 1961. In a series of historical plays, he shook up the genre of Leniniana. (Faina Ranevskaya sarcastically remarked: "Shatrov - this is the Krupskaya of our days".)

His plays are often based on historical events. "The Bolsheviks" is based on the true story of Fanny Kaplan's attempt to assassinate Vladimir Lenin. The play "The Peace Treaty of Brest-Litovsk" was initially banned by the regime in the USSR due to its depiction of Lenin and was approved for publication only in 1987, 25 years after it was written. In 1988 an all-Russian cast toured Europe performing "The Peace Treaty of Brest-Litovsk"; in 1990 the company toured in the US as well.

Mikhail Shatrov died in Moscow at the 79th year of his life from a heart attack in his apartment in the House on the Embankment. He was buried at the Troyekurovskoye Cemetery.

The 1968 Soviet film The Sixth of July is based on Shatrov's play with the same name.
