= Galina Aksenova =

Russian historian

Galina Gennad'evna Aksenova (born 17 July 1959) is a film historian, theatre scholar, director, scenarist, professor and translator. She holds a Candidate of the Arts degree. She is married to actor and director Veniamin Smekhov.

== Biography ==
Galina Aksenova was born in 1959 and she graduated from the Russian State Institute of Stage Arts in St. Petersburg in 1981. In 1988 she completed graduate school at the Russian Institute of Theatre Arts in Moscow, earning her Candidate of the Arts degree. Her graduate dissertation was on the art of Peter Brook. She is a member of the Union of Journalists and the Union of Theatre Professionals of Russia.

For 15 years Galina taught the History of Russian film at the Middlebury College Russian Summer School in the United States. She was the associate director of the School from 2000 to 2009. As an invited guest professor she taught courses at Grinnell College, Emory University, Maryland University, Smith College, Kansas University and Illinois Wesleyan University in the United States. Galina was a professor at the Moscow Art Theatre School from 2007 to 2015. She has been a lecturer for the Moscow Art Theatre's international graduate program and the National Theatre Institute of the United States. Galina teaches both world and Russian film history, and she is a silent cinema specialist. She is the author of academic articles published in foreign, specialized publications. She is a scenarist and director of documentary made-for-television films. Galina has published articles about theatre and film in many journals, including Teatr, Ogonek, Vechernyaya Moskva, Nezavisimaya gazeta, and Rossiyskaya gazeta, and is a columnist for Russkiy pioner ("Newly Released Films"). She is also a translator from Polish to Russian.

Galina gives several series of public lectures, including "Painting and the Cinema" (Fridays at the Pushkin Museum, GMII im. A.S. Pushkina), "Film Fashionista," American Cinema of the 20th Century: Between Art and Business and "Italian Cinema: From the Beginning to the Last Greats" (The Film Club of GUM).

In 2013 Galina was a member of the jury for the student film competition of the 33rd International Festival of The Russian State Institute of Cinema.

She was a Maya Brin Lecturer at the University of Maryland in 2015.

== Filmography ==
Galina is a scenarist and director for several documentary films.

Scenarist 1. 1992 - Dreams of Israel: Film 1 "Strolling in Jerusalem" 2. 1992 - Dreams of Israel: Film 2 "Eternal City" 3. 1992 - Dreams of Israel: Film 3 "We Are Israeli" 4. 1992 - Dreams of Israel: Film 4 "Olim Chadashim" 5. 1992 - Dreams of Israel: Film 5 "Unknown Israel" 6. 1993 - Moon On Stage 7. 1993 - Servant of Two Lords (documentary film about the Gabim Theatre) 8. 1993 - Steps in Emptiness 9. 1995 - Theatre of My Memory (a 30 episode series of documentary films) 10. 2007 - I Forgot the Weather of My Childhood (documentary film about Varlam Shalamov) 11. 2016 - Archives: Film 1. Alexander Dovzhenko and Yulia Solntseva 12. 2016 - Archives: Film 2. Elem Klimov and Larisa Shept'ko

Director 1. 2011 - Twelve Months of Tango (musical film) 2. 2013 - Vladmir Tendryakov: Portrait On the Background of Time (documentary film about Vladmir Tendryakov) 3. 2013 - Movie Star Between the Hammer and Sickle (documentary film about Marina Ladiynina) 4. 2015 - The Last Poet of the Great War (documentary film about Ion Degen) 5. 2015 - Boris Zaborov: Searching For Lost Time (documentary film about Boris Zaborov) 6. 2016 - Archives: Film 1. Alexander Dovzhenko and Yulia Solntseva 7. 2016 - Archives: Film 2. Elem Klimov and Larisa Shept'ko

Theatre 1. 2015 - The Spine of the Flute (V. Mayakovsky), director (Taganka Theatre)

== Literary works ==
Books

- G.G. Aksenova, T.K. Kirsh. Student Theatre. Moscow: Russkiy yaziyk, 1989
- Galina Aksenova. 1968 and Other Years. Moscow: Biblioteka "Ogonek," 1991
- Galina Aksenova. "New Brook: The Cherry Orchard and The Tragedy of Carmen" // Western Art of the 20th Century. Classical Traces and Modernity. (ed. B.I. Zingerman) Moscow: Nauka, 1992. - pp. 122–132
- Galina Aksenova. "A Tragedy in Grey" // Lioubimov: La Taganka. (ed. B. Picon-Vallin) Paris: Centre National de Recherche Theatrale, 1997
- Galina Aksenova. "Moscow, Open City: Perception of Neorealism in the U.S.S.R. in the 1940s-50s" // Incontri con il cinema italiano. (ed. A. Vitti) Salvatore Sciascia Editore, Italy, 2003
- Galina Aksenova. "Textual Metamorphoses On the Way From Fabula To Siuzhet: G. Ostrovsky's Film Script and V. Todorovsky's Film My Half-Brother Frankenstein" // The First Five Years of 20th Century Russian Literature. (ed. H. Melat) Sorbonne University Press, 2006.
- Galina Aksenova. "History of Russian Cinema" // Advanced Russian Through History. (ed. B. Rifkin and O. Kagan) Yale University Press, 1997
- Galina Aksenova. "Big History of A Little Purse" // Passions of A Vintage Lover: Stories of Collectors. (ed. G. Aksenova) Moscow: Staroe Kino, 2016. pp. 36–55

Translations

- 1983 - Mikhail Rusinek. Heaven Not Lost. Moscow: Raduga, 1983
- 1986 - Bogdan Cheshko. Selected Collection. (translated from Polish) Organized by V.S. Selivanov. Moscow: Raduga, 1986
- 1988 - Slavomir Mrozhek. Portrait. (directed by v. Koz'menko-Delinde, 1988)
- 1988 - Slavomir Mrozhek. Contract. A play in three acts. Moscow: VAAP-Inform, 1988. (Performances - Contract (Moscow Theatre of Satire, dir. M. Zonnenshtral', 1988), Contract For Murder (Russian Army Theatre, dir. A. Vil'kin, 1988)
- 1988 - Mira Mikhalovska. Rose - It's A Rose. It's A Rose. Mono-Drama. Moscow: VAAP-Inform, 1988. (Mira Michalowska, Roza jest roza jest roza)
- Agneshka Osetskaya. Variety Stars
