= Coasts in the Mist =

1986 film directed by Yuli Karasik

- Russian poster
- Russian: Берега в тумане
- Directed by: Yuli Karasik
- Written by: Budimir Metalnikov; Angel Vagenshtain
- Starring: Anatoly Kuznetsov; Leonid Filatov; Boris Lukanov; Irina Kupchenko; Tanya Dimitrova
- Cinematography: Plamen Vagenshtain
- Edited by: Lyubov Filkina
- Music by: Yuri Butsko
- Production companies: Mosfilm; Bulgaria Film; Sovinfilm
- Release date: 1986
- Running time: 145 minutes (Soviet Union); 137 minutes (Bulgaria)
- Countries: Soviet Union; Bulgaria
- Language: Russian

Coasts in the Mist (Russian: Берега в тумане) is a 1986 Soviet historical drama film directed by Yuli Karasik.

The film takes place in 1921. Wrangel's army is defeated and takes refuge in Bulgaria. White Army colonel Sergey Egoriev lives here with his son and daughter. Dmitry Shelopugin's family took Sergei's lost wife and his youngest daughter, and Dmitry himself goes to Bulgaria to agitate Russian soldiers.

== Plot ==
Autumn 1921. Thirty thousand Russian soldiers and officers of the defeated White Army of Wrangel have found refuge in Bulgaria after the evacuation from Crimea. Baron Pyotr Nikolayevich Wrangel (“Olyalin”) receives the report of General Alexander Pavlovich Kutepov (“Shcherbakov”) on the successful completion of troop redeployment. Secret meetings take place among leaders of the White Movement, including Wrangel, General Pavel Nikolaevich Shatilov, Colonel of counterintelligence Pyotr Titolovich Samokhvalov, and representatives of the Entente, including British and French officers and the British spy and adventurer Sidney Reilly (“Yursky”). These meetings discuss plans for subversive operations against Soviet Russia.

Against this backdrop, the story focuses on the fate of White Army Colonel Sergey Egoriev (“Anatoly Kuznetsov”), who has fled through Turkey to Bulgaria with his son and daughter. His wife and youngest daughter, who were left behind in Sevastopol, find refuge with the family of Dmitry Shelapugin (“Leonid Filatov”). By a twist of fate, the Bolshevik Shelapugin is sent to Bulgaria to conduct propaganda work among the Russian soldiers.

== Cast ==
- Anatoly Kuznetsov as Polkovnik Egoriev
- Leonid Filatov as Chekist Shelapugin
- Boris Lukanov as Anton
- Irina Kupchenko as Tamara Skarzhinskaya
- Tanya Dimitrova as Rayna
- Peter Batakliev as Lyubcho
- Stefan Danailov as Sokrat
- Lyubomir Mladenov as Tsar Boris III
- Lyubomir Dimitrov as Kalfov
- Nikola Todev as Stavrov
