= Dmitry Mezhevich =

Russo-Soviet theatrical actor (1940–2017)

- Дмитрий Межевич
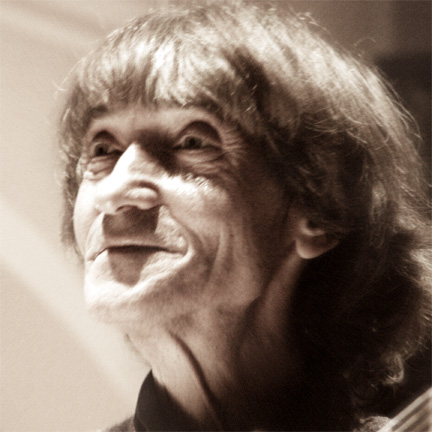
- Mezhevich in 2003
- Born: 18 December 1940; Moscow, RSFSR, USSR
- Died: 8 March 2017 (aged 76); Moscow, Russian Federation
- Occupations: Theater actor, bard
- Years active: 1968-2017

Dmitry Yevgenievich Mezhevich (Russian: Дмитрий Евгеньевич Межевич; 19 December 1940 – 8 March 2017) was a Soviet and Russian actor and songwriter.

Mezhevich worked in the Moscow Taganka Theatre, where he appeared in such productions as The Good Person of Szechwan, Hamlet, Woe from Wit, and Tartuffe. He studied oboe and eventually took up the guitar. Bulat Okudjava dedicated a song to him. In 2011, Mezhevich left Taganka Theatre.
