= Heinz Braun =

German actor

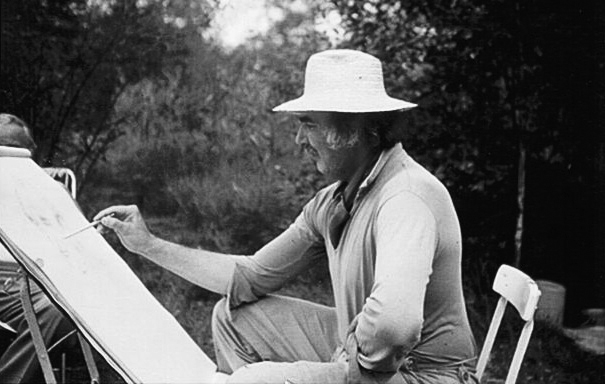
- Born: 12 January 1938; Munich
- Died: 21 February 1986 (aged 48); Munich
- Citizenship: German
- Occupations: Painter; Postman; Actor
- Website: www.braunheinz.de

Heinz Braun (12 January 1938 in Munich – 21 February 1986 in Munich) was a German autodidact painter and occasional actor.

== Personal life ==
Braun was born into a modest background. His mother was a tailor and his father a taxi driver. After completing school, he became a mail carrier. His father occasionally painted, and Braun, an autodidact, followed his example. He married Elisabeth Schmelzer in 1965 and moved to Germering, at the outskirts of his native Munich. There he continued to work as a postman. In January 1968, the couple had a son they named Alexander.

In 1966 he had a nervous breakdown. After that, he began to create abstract works. In 1979 Braun became unable to work due to a walking disability. He retired from the post office and began to receive a disability pension.

== Artistic work ==
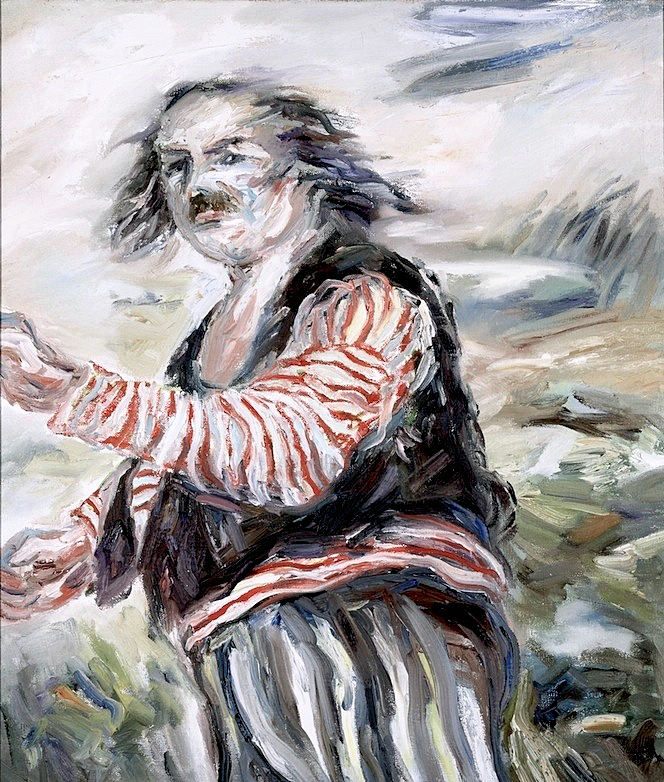
Self-portrait "Faschingsprinz" (1978)

Braun painted at least since completing school, but from 1951 onward, he devoted himself more and more to painting. In the beginning, his paintings were mainly decorative art, but gradually his personal style got more expressive and unconventional. From about 1971, Braun painted with oils on canvas in a style that was partly photo-realistic and partly surreal. Influential to this change of style was his visit to the documenta 5, contemporary art exhibition in 1972. He is said to have spent more and more time at the Alte Pinakothek in Munich, studying the Old Masters, copying many works and figuring out their styles. In 1974, Braun became acquainted with Herbert Achternbusch, a German independent movie director, and played leading parts in some of his productions. He is remembered as a bulky and boisterous man, 2 meters (6 feet 4 inches) tall and described as ferocious, in the later years even rabid.

A 1982 article in the magazine Stern is assumed to be the initial recognition of Braun's career as an artist. From then on, his work was compared to the "Neue Wilde", a group of several artist in the 1980s. National and international exhibitions followed. In 1983, his artwork was presented, among others, in the Gallery Pon in Zurich and the Ponova Gallery in Toronto, Ontario, Canada.

After being diagnosed with cancer, Braun painted obsessively. On one hand, he tried to face up to the disease by means of paintings, on the other hand due to his paintings he never lost his optimism. He began to use expressive techniques, such as modeling landscapes with clay, sand, mud and dung on the canvas and became brutally honest in his portraits of friends as well as in portraying himself, showing the decay of his body under the influence of laryngeal cancer.

Only twice did he earn money beyond the bare necessities by selling some works. Both times, he spent it on alternative cancer therapies in the care of the controversial Doctor Julius Hackethal.

== Death and legacy ==
In 1986 Heinz Braun succumbed to cancer. After his death both the Munich Stadtmuseum and the Kunsthalle Emden dedicated solo exhibitions to his artwork. The "Cycle Großhadern", his last drawings that were created while at the Klinikum Großhadern, a hospital of Munich, now is part of the permanent exhibition of the Kunsthalle Emden. Additionally, works by Braun are housed in the collection of the Munich Stadtmuseum, in the Lenbachhaus Munich, and also in various private foundations and numerous private collections. The city of Germering has named a hall of the civic center after Heinz Braun.

The respected Süddeutsche Zeitung called his works an elemental power and himself an event of nature because of the impressive force of his paintings.

== Public collections ==
- Lenbachhaus, Munich
- Museen der Stadt Regensburg
- Municipal Art Gallery in the Cordonhaus, Cham
- Museen der Stadt Dachau
- City of Germering
- Stadtmuseum Munich
- Kunsthalle Emden
- Museum für aktuelle Kunst – Sammlung Hurrle Durbach bei Offenburg

== Filmography ==
The following is a selection of Braun's filmography:

- 1975 – Das Andechser Gefühl (The Andechs feeling)
- 1976 – Die Atlantikschwimmer (The Atlantic swimmers)
- 1977 – Bierkampf (Beerfight)
- 1978 – Servus Bayern (Goodbye Bavaria)
- 1978 – Der junge Mönch (The young monk)
- 1979 – Der Komantsche (The Comanche)
