= Taganka Theatre =

- Театр драмы и комедии на Таганке
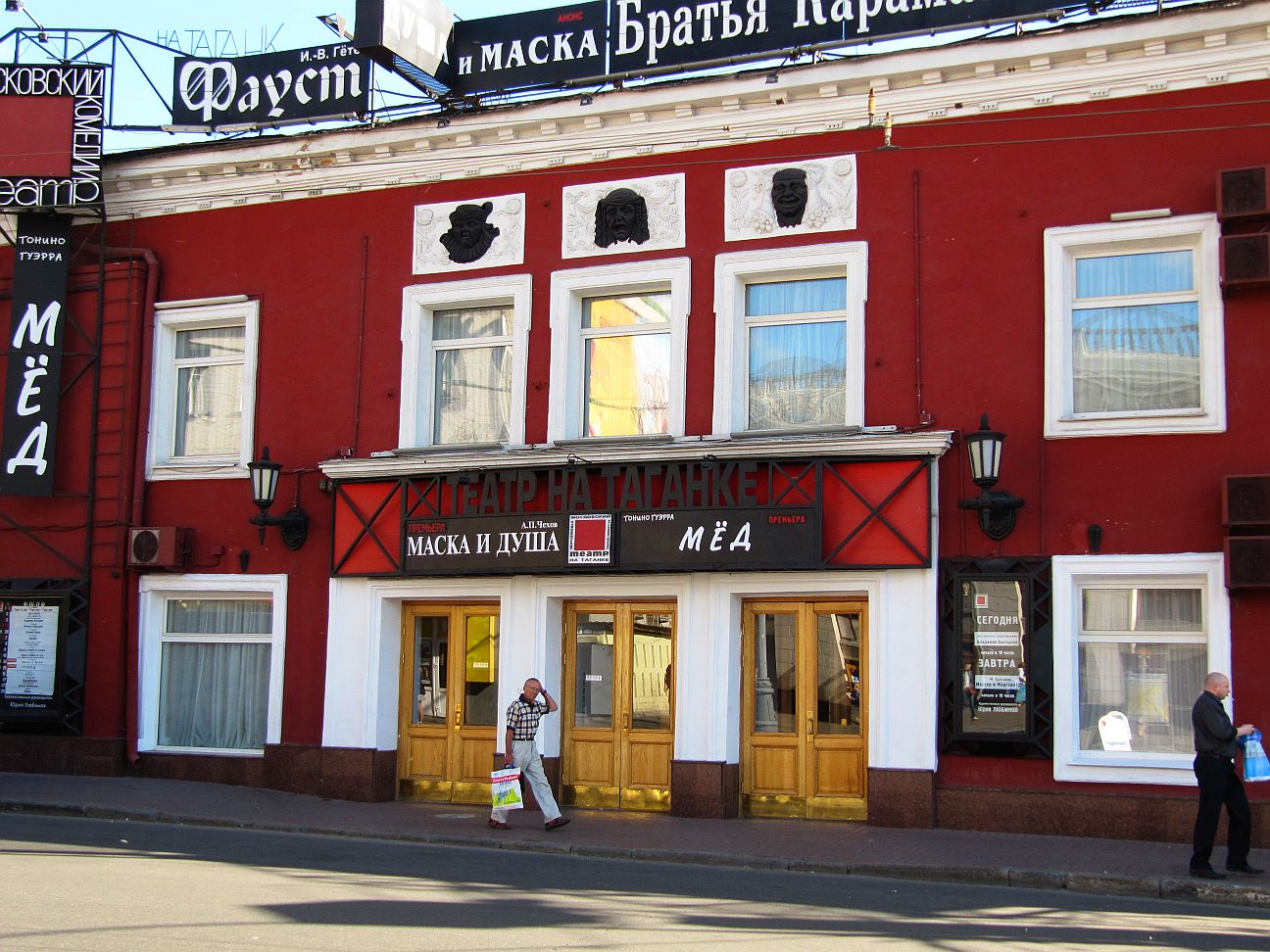
- View of the theatre in 2011
- Interactive map of Taganka Theatre
- Address: Taganka Square; Moscow; Russia
- Coordinates: 55°44′37″N 37°39′14″E
- Type: repertory theatre

Construction
- Opened: 1946

Website
- http://taganka.theatre.ru/ Official website

Taganka Theatre (Russian: Театр на Таганке, Театр драмы и комедии на Таганке, "Таганка") is a theater located in the Art Nouveau building on Taganka Square in Moscow.

== History ==
The Drama and Comedy Theater was founded in 1946. The head director was Aleksandr Plotnikov and the actors came from various Moscow theater schools and provincial theaters. By 1960s the theater's attendance was at its lowest and in January 1964 Plotnikov resigned. In his place came Yuri Lyubimov, then an actor at Vakhtangov theater who brought with him his own students from Shchukin Theater School.

Under Lyubimov, the theatre shot to popularity in Moscow, with Vladimir Vysotsky, Zinaida Slavina and Alla Demidova as the leading actors. Other notable members of Lyubimov's troupe have been Valery Zolotukhin, Veniamin Smekhov, and Leonid Filatov. Nikolai Erdman (famous for his work with Vsevolod Meyerhold in the 1920s) was responsible for the theatre's repertoire.

The theatre had been deep in trouble with Soviet authorities, who banned many of Lyubimov's productions, and eventually in 1984 the director was stripped of his Soviet citizenship while working on a stage production in England and thus forced to stay in exile in the West.

When another outstanding stage director, Anatoly Efros, was appointed to run the theatre in Lyubimov's stead, he was boycotted and reviled by leading actors in the foulest terms. After Efros's death three years later, a staunch Communist supporter, Nikolay Gubenko, was nominated to lead the troupe. Lyubimov's return to the theatre in 1989 led to the troupe being split, with Gubenko and his party seceding from Lyubimov's company and forming their own "Community of Taganka Actors" (Содружество актеров Таганки).

In June, 2011 before a performance of Bertolt Brecht's play The Good Person of Szechwan in Czech Republic the actors of the theatre refused to rehearse unless they were paid first. The 93-year-old Lyubimov paid the money and left the theatre. "I've had enough of this disgrace, these humiliations, this lack of desire to work, this desire just for money", he said. Two leading actors of the theatre, Dmitry Mezhevich and Alla Smirdan, as well as some administrative assistants, followed Lyubimov. After Lyubimov's resignation the theater was headed first by Valery Zolotukhin (2011-2013), then by Vladimir Fleisher (2013-2015) and since March 2015, by Irina Apeksimova.
