= Yuli Karasik =

Soviet film director and screenwriter (1923–2005)

Yuli Yurievich Karasik (Russian: Юлий Юрьевич Карасик) (August 24, 1923 – January 23, 2005) was a Soviet film director, screenwriter, and film arts educator.

== Awards ==
- 1968: Special prize at the XVI Karlovy Vary International Film Festival for The Sixth of July
- 1969: Meritorious worker in arts of the RSFSR

1973: Special prize "Silver Hugo" at the Chicago International Film Festival for the film The Seagull

- 1977: People's Artist of the RSFSR

== Filmography ==
- 1960: ru:Ждите писем
- 1962:The Wild Dog Dingo
- 1966: ru:Человек, которого я люблю
- 1968:The Sixth of July
- 1972:The Seagull
- 1974: ru:Самый жаркий месяц
- 1976: ru:Собственное мнение
- 1979: A Glass of Water
- 1986:Coasts in the Mist
- 1987:ru: Без солнца
