= Vakhtangov State Academic Theatre =

Theatre in Moscow, Russia

- Госуда́рственный академи́ческий теа́тр и́мени Евгения Вахта́нгова
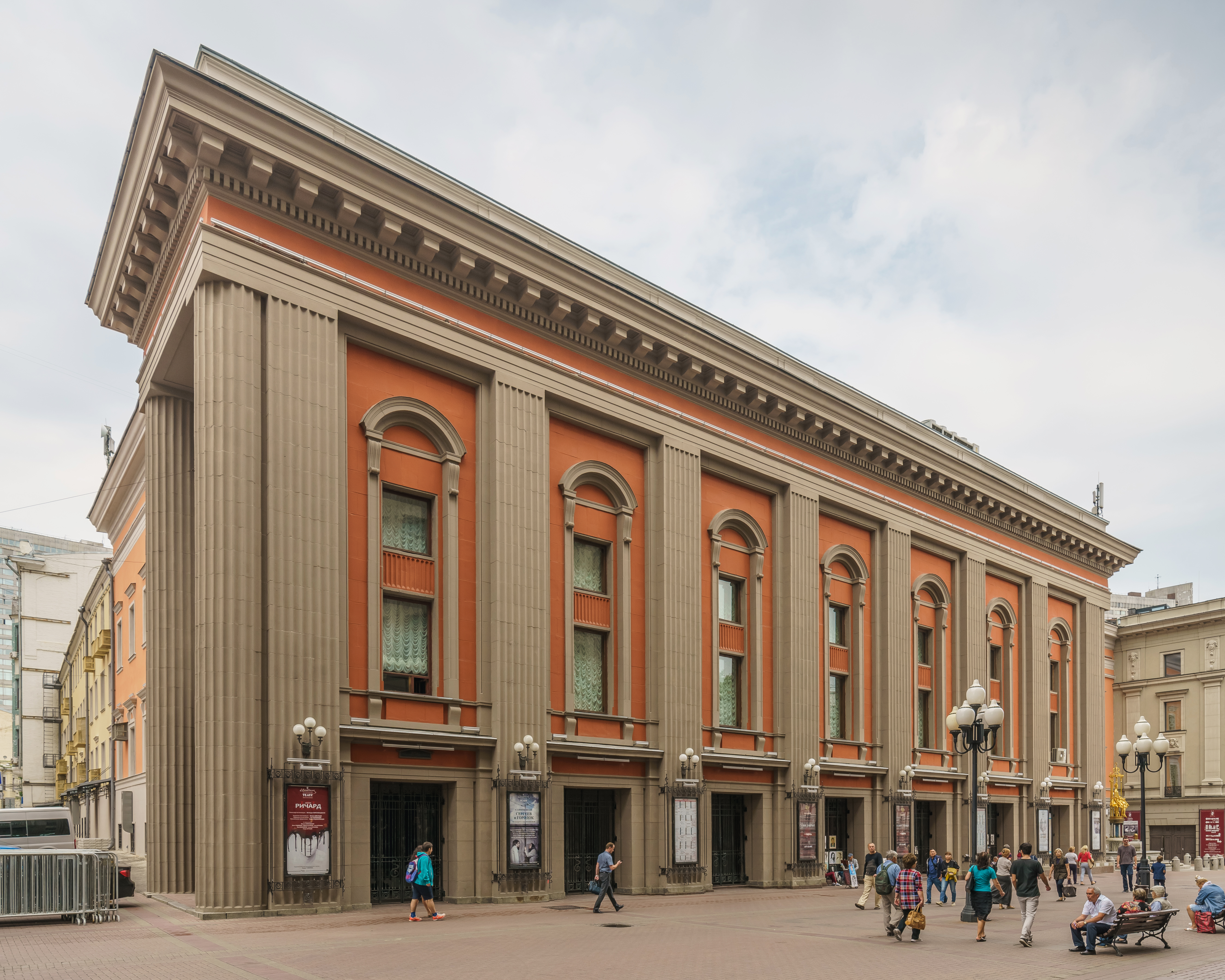
- Interactive map of Vakhtangov State Academic Theatre
- Address: Moscow; Russia
- Coordinates: 55°44′59″N 37°35′29″E
- Type: repertory theatre

Construction
- Opened: 13 November 1921

Website
- vakhtangov.ru/en/

The Vakhtangov State Academic Theatre (Russian: Госуда́рственный академи́ческий теа́тр и́мени Евгения Вахта́нгова) is a drama theatre in Moscow. It was founded in 1913 as the Student Drama Studio, headed by Yevgeny Vakhtangov. The official opening date of the 3rd Studio of the Moscow Art Theatre (MKhAT) is considered to be November 13, 1921, on this day the play "The Miracle of St. Anthony" was shown. In 1926, the studio was renamed the Yevgeny Vakhtangov Theatre, after its founder and first director. In 1956, the theatre was given academic status.

== History ==
The period of collective management of the theatre ended in 1939, when Ruben Simonov, who had created his own theatre studio in 1928, was appointed artistic director. In 1939, his studio was merged with the theatre, which is now called Lenkom. The personality of the director, as before, began to determine much in the future path of the Vakhtangov Theatre. Colleagues noted Simonov's talent, his musicality, rare sense of rhythm, delicate manners, but at the same time complex character, "with oriental overtones". His first performance was The Government Inspector, later the drama Field Marshal Kutuzov was staged with invited director Nikolai Okhlopkov. The premiere of the last performance Masquerade directed by Andrei Tutyshkin took place on June 21, 1941 – on the eve of the beginning of the Great Patriotic War. During one of the first bombings of Moscow, on the night of July 23–24 at 2:10 a.m., a bomb hit the theater building, killing several people, including the actor Vasily Kuza. The theater building was badly damaged, and the scenery was destroyed.

During the war, the theater formed and sent a team of artists to the front, which included Anna Orochko, Alexandra Remizova, Alexander Gabovich, Alexey Kotrelev, Isai Spektor, Anna Danilovich, Valentina Dancheva, Alexander Lebedev, Ivan Solovyov, Alexander Grave, Nikolay Yanovsky, Nikolay Mozyaykin, Tatyana Blazhina, Veronika Vasilyeva, Alexander Golubev and others. Spektor headed the team and was appointed director of the Front Branch of the theater. Ruben Simonov highly praised his work in the construction of the Vakhtangov Theater, and he later spoke about it more than once (see the book by V. Maksimova "I Love. Yulia"). Marshal G. K. Zhukov considered Spektor his friend (ibid.). The artistic director was Anna Orochko. The brigade went with the active army to Berlin and returned to Moscow in June 1945.

In August 1946, a decree was issued "On the repertoire of drama theaters and measures to improve it": theaters were obliged to stage plays on contemporary Soviet themes and on themes debunking the Western way of life every year, so the theater's main lyric-comedy repertoire was banned. In 1948, the production Young Guard was presented, in 1950 the anti-American pamphlet Missouri Waltz, in 1951 In the Middle of the Century about the criminal activities of American warmongers.

In 1952, at the 19th Congress of the CPSU, Georgy Malenkov officially allowed satire. In the spring of 1954, the theatre's repertoire included the "happiest" production: director Evgeny Simonov staged a play based on Samuil Marshak's fairy tale To Be Afraid of Grief is to Not See Happiness. In the 1950s, the second generation of actors appeared in the troupe, among whom were Yuri Lyubimov, Nikolai Gritsenko, Yulia Borisova, Antonina Gunchenko, Alla Parfanyak, Vladimir Etush, Evgeny Simonov, Mikhail Ulyanov, Yuri Yakovlev, Vasily Lanovoy, Lyudmila Maksakova, Anatoly Katsynsky, Grigory Abrikosov, Elena Dobronravova, Nina Nekhlopochenko, Vyacheslav Shalevich, Ekaterina Raikina, Yuri Volyntsev. The wonderful performances of director Alexandra Remizova were of great importance for the glory of the theatre. In 1956, the theatre was awarded the title of academic. Until the end of the 1950s, the confrontation between Ruben Simonov and Boris Zakhava in the management intensified, so in 1959 he left the theatre. In 1963, the performance of Princess Turandot was resumed, and a year later, Yuri Lyubimov left for the position of director at the new Taganka Theatre. Ruben Simonov died on December 5, 1968, and the management of the theatre passed to his son.

In 2018 he was awarded the Fiddler on the Roof Award in the Theatre category.
