= List of Soviet films of 1966 =

A list of films produced in the Soviet Union in 1966 (see 1966 in film).

== 1966 ==
Title	Original title	Director	Cast	Genre	Notes
1966
Aladdin and His Magic Lamp	Волшебная лампа Аладдина	Boris Rytsarev	Boris Bystrov, Dodo Chogovadze	Fantasy	
Andrei Rublev	Андрей Рублёв	Andrei Tarkovsky	Anatoly Solonitsyn, Ivan Lapikov, Nikolai Grinko, Nikolai Sergeyev	Drama	Won the FIPRESCI prize.
Aybolit-66	Айболит-66	Rolan Bykov	Oleg Yefremov	Comedy, musical	
Beware of the Car	Берегись автомобиля	Eldar Ryazanov	Innokenty Smoktunovsky, Oleg Yefremov, Andrei Mironov, Anatoli Papanov	Comedy	
A Boy and a Girl	Мальчик и девочка	Yuliy Fayt	Natalya Bogunova	Drama	
Chief of Chukotka	Начальник Чукотки	Vitaly Melnikov	Mikhail Kononov	Comedy	
Children of Don Quixote	Дети Дон Кихота	Yevgeni Karelov	Anatoli Papanov, Vera Orlova, Vladimir Korenev, Lev Prygunov, Andrey Belyaninov	Comedy	
Day Stars	Дневные звёзды	Igor Talankin	Alla Demidova	Drama	
Don't Forget... Lugovaya Station	Не забудь… станция Луговая	Nikita Kurikhin and Leonid Menaker	Georgy Yumatov	Drama	
The Elusive Avengers	Неуловимые мстители	Edmond Keosayan	Viktor Kosykh	Action, eastern	
Going Inside a Storm	Иду на грозу	Sergei Mikaelyan	Aleksandr Belyavsky, Vasily Lanovoy, Rostislav Plyatt, Mikhail Astangov, Zhanna Prokhorenko	Drama	
Go There, Don't Know Where	Поди туда, не знаю куда	Ivan Ivanov-Vano	Georgiy Vitsin	Animation	
Hello, That's Me!	Здравствуй, это я!	Frunze Dovlatyan	Armen Dzhigarkhanyan, Rolan Bykov, Natalya Fateyeva, Margarita Terekhova	Drama	Was entered into the 1966 Cannes Film Festival and nominated for the Palme d'Or
Hero of Our Time	Герой нашего времени	Stanislav Rostotsky	Vladimir Ivashov	Drama	
I'm a Soldier Mom	Я солдат, мама	Manos Zacharias	Vladimir Grammatikov	Drama	
In S. City	В городе С.	Iosif Kheifits	Andrei Popov	Drama	
Katerina Izmailova	Катерина Измайлова	Mikhail Shapiro	Galina Vishnevskaya	Opera	Entered into the 1967 Cannes Film Festival
Lenin in Poland	Ленин в Польше	Sergei Yutkevich	Maksim Shtraukh	Drama	Yutkevich won the award for Best Director at the 1966 Cannes Film Festival
A Long Happy Life	Долгая счастливая жизнь	Gennady Shpalikov	Inna Gulaya	Melodrama	
Man without a Passport	Человек без паспорта	Anatoly Bobrovsky	Vladimir Zamansky	Thriller	
Meeting in Mountains	Встреча в горах	Nikoloz Sanishvili	Leila Abashidze	Comedy	
A Mother's Devotion	Верность матери	Mark Donskoy	Nina Menshikova	Drama	
Nobody Wanted to Die	Russian: Никто не хотел умирать Lithuanian: Niekas nenorėjo mirti	Vytautas Žalakevičius	Regimantas Adomaitis, Juozas Budraitis, Algimantas Masiulis, Donatas Banionis	Drama	Lithuanian SSR; USSR State Prize, 1967
An Old, Old Tale	Старая, старая сказка	Nadezhda Kosheverova	Oleg Dahl, Marina Neyolova, Vladimir Etush	Fantasy, musical	
Older sister	Старшая сестра	Georgy Natanson	Tatyana Doronina, Natalya Tenyakova, Mikhail Zharov	Drama	
A Pistol Shot	Выстрел	Naum Trakhtenberg	Mikhail Kozakov	Drama	
The Republic of ShKID	Республика ШКИД	Gennadi Poloka	Sergei Yursky, Yulia Burygina, Pavel Luspekayev	Comedy-drama	
Royal Regatta	Королевская регата	Yuri Chulyukin	Natalya Kustinskaya	Comedy	
The Story of Asya Klyachina	История Аси Клячиной	Andrei Konchalovsky	Iya Savvina	Drama	
On Thin Ice	По тонкому льду	Damir Vyatich-Berezhnykh	Viktor Korshunov	Drama	
The Gypsy	Цыган	Yevgeny Matveyev	Yevgeny Matveyev	Drama	
The Tale of Tsar Saltan	Сказка о царе Салтане	Alexander Ptushko	Vladimir Andreyev, Larisa Golubkina, Oleg Vidov	Fantasy	
There Lived Kozyavin	Жил-был Козявин	Andrey Khrzhanovsky	Aleksandr Grave	Animation	
Three Fat Men	Три толстяка	Aleksey Batalov, Iosif Shapiro	Lina Braknytė, Pyotr Artemyev, Aleksey Batalov, Valentin Nikulin	Fantasy	
Two Tickets for a Daytime Picture Show	Два билета на дневной сеанс	Gerbert Rappaport	Aleksandr Zbruyev	Crime	
The Ugly Story	Скверный анекдот	Aleksandr Alov, Vladimir Naumov	Yevgeny Yevstigneyev	Comedy	
Wings	Крылья	Larisa Shepitko	Maya Bulgakova, Zhanna Bolotova	Drama	
Women	Женщины	Pavel Lyubimov	Inna Makarova	Drama	
Year as Long as Life	Год как жизнь	Grigori Roshal	Igor Kvasha	Drama	
