= 53rd Locarno Film Festival =

Film festival in Locarno, Switzerland

- Opening film: X-Men directed by Bryan Singer
- Location: Locarno, Switzerland
- Founded: 1946
- Awards: Golden Leopard: Baba (Father) directed by Wang Shuo
- Artistic director: Marco Mueller
- Festival date: Opening: 2 August 2000; Closing: 12 August 2000
- Website: LFF

Locarno Film Festival
- 54th 52nd

The 53rd Locarno Film Festival was held from 2 to 12 August 2000 in Locarno, Switzerland. There were 18 films in competition. The opening film of the festival was the international premiere of X-Men directed by Bryan Singer. The Leopard of Honor was awarded to Paul Verhoeven, for his cinematic career, and his film Hollow Man had its European premiere on the Piazza Grande, the 10,000 seat open-air theater. A section called "Kings of the B's" was held to celebrate B-movies.

This was artistic director Marco Mueller's last year at the festival. After 9 years as the head of the festival Mueller left to become a film producer. Upon leaving he said it was hard to have a festival niche between big Hollywood summer releases and art house cinema, especially when losing out on films to the Venice Film Festival. Derek Elley of Variety remarked that, "Muller failed in his ambition to turn the well-regarded but basically eggheady Euro art-movie event into a glitzy fest to rival Venice." This was also the last year for recently hired festival president Giuseppe Buffi, who died two weeks before the opening night. In a closed meeting the day following Buffi's death, Mueller told the festival committee he would be resigning.

The Golden Leopard, the festival's top prize, was awarded to Father directed by Wang Shuo. The film was completed in 1996, but was banned by the Chinese government. Locarno artistic director, Marco Mueller arranged to smuggle the only English subtitled print out of China for the festival. Baba (Father) had its world premiere at Locarno and was shown without any prior advertising as a surprise film.

== Official Jury ==
=== Official International Jury ===
- Naum Klejman, Jury president, Soviet film scholar and critic
- Todd McCarthy, American film critic
- Zhang Yuan, Chinese director
- Shinji Aoyama, Japanese director
- Helene Angel, French director
- Alessandro D'Alatri, Italian director
- Clemens Klopfenstein, Swiss director
- Shirin Nashat, Iranian director
- Paz Alicia Garciadiego, Mexican screenwriter

== Official Sections ==
The following films were screened in these sections:

=== Piazza Grande ===
Piazza Grande

English Title	Original Title	Director(s)	Year	Production Country
Azzurro		Denis Rabaglia	2000	Switzerland, Italia
Crazy		Hans-Christian Schmid	1999	Germany
Hollow Man		Paul Verhoeven	2000	USA
Road Trip		Todd Phillips	2000	USA
Shaft		John Singleton	2000	USA
The Closer You Get		Aileen Ritchie	1999	Great Britain
The House of Mirth		Terence Davies	2000	Great Britain
X-Men		Bryan Singer	2000	USA

=== International Competition ===
International Competition

English Title	Original Title	Director(s)	Year	Production Country
101 Reykjavík		Baltasar Kormákur	1999	Iceland
The Heart's Root	A Raiz Do Coração	Paulo Rocha	2000	Portugal
Father	Baba	Shuo Wang	1996	China
Fuck Me	Baise-Moi	Virginie Despentes, Coralie Trinh Thi	2000	France
Bronx-Barbès		Eliane de Latour	2000	France
Chronically Unfeasible	Cronicamente Inviavel	Sérgio Bianchi	2000	Brazil
Hold-Up	Der Überfall	Florian Flicker	2000	Austria
A Lingering Face	Feichang Xiari	Lu Xuechang	2000	China
Gostanza Da Libbiano		Paolo Benvenuti	2000	Italia
Hamlet		Michael Almereyda	1999	USA
Firefly	Hotaru	Naomi Kawase	2000	Japan
Love, Money, Love	L Amour, L Argent, L Amour	Philip Gröning	2000	Germany
Manila		Romuald Karmakar	1999	Germany
The Season of Guavas	Mua Oi	Nhat Minh Dang	2000	Vietnam
In Vanda's Room	No Quarto Da Vanda	Pedro Costa	2000	Portugal
Noutsas Scola		Merab Kokotchachvili	2000	Georgia
The Low Down		Jamie Thraves	2000	Great Britain
Little Cheung	Xilu Xiang	Fruit Chan	1999	Hong Kong

=== Filmmakers of the Present ===
The Concorso Cineasti del Presente, also known as the Filmmakers of the Present Competition, showcases first and second feature films from emerging filmmakers

==== Video Competition ====
Video Competition – Filmmakers of the Present
Original Title	English Title	Director(s)	Year	Production Country
Addio Lugano Bella	Goodbye Lugano Bella	Francesca Solari	2000	Switzerland, France
Asylum		Chris Petit, Iain Sinclair	2000	Great Britain
Das Himmler-Projekt	The Himmler Project	Romuald Karmakar	2000	Germany
Delphine Seyrig, Portrait D Une Comète	Delphine Seyrig, Portrait of a Comet	Jacqueline Veuve	2000	Switzerland, France
Fei-Ya! Fei-Ya!/Fly, Fly (Our Chinese Friends)		Ingeborg Lüscher (Ying-bo)	1999	China, Switzerland
Für Mich Gab S Nur Noch Fassbinder Die Glücklichen Opfer Des Rainer Werner F.	For Me There Was Only Fassbinder the Happy Victims of Rainer Werner F.	Rosa von Praunheim	2000	Germany
I Thought I Was Seeing Convicts		Harun Farocki	2000	France, Germany
Jeanne, Aujourd Hui	Jeanne, Today	Marcel Hanoun	2000	France
L Apprentissage De La Ville	City Learning	Gérard Mordillat	2000	France
L Homme Aux Semelles D Or	Man with Golden Soles	Omar Amiralay	2000	France
L Onore Delle Armi	The Honor of Weapons	Gianni Amelio	1999	Italia
Les Yeux Fermés	Eyes Closed	Olivier Py	1999	France
Luigi Einaudi. Diario Dell Esilio Svizzero	Luigi Einaudi. Diary of the Swiss Exile	Villi Hermann	2000	Switzerland
Nina		Marco Bellocchio	1999	Italia
O Livro De Raul	The Book of Raul	Arthur Omar	1999	Brazil
Ofelia - L Affresco	Ofelia - The Fresco	Marco Bellocchio	2000	Italia
Om Namah Shivay - Om Gottes Willen	To Namah Shivay - To Gottes Willen	Nina Hagen	2000	Germany
Once & Future Queen		Todd Verow	2000	USA
Pierre Ou Les Ambiguïtés - Trois Épisodes	Stone or Ambiguities - Three Episodes	Leos Carax	1999	France
Puisi Tak Terkuburkan	Poetry is not Buried	Garin Nugroho	2000	Indonesia
R 11		Eva Baratta, Vincenzo De Cecco	2000	Italia
Seule Avec La Guerre	Alone with War	Danielle Arbid	2000	France, Belgium
Sorelle	Sisters	Marco Bellocchio	1999	Italia
Un Filo Di Passione	A Thread of Passion	Marco Bellocchio	1999	Italia
Un Posto Al Mondo	A Place in the World	Mario Martone, Jacopo Quadri	2000	Italia
Original title	English title	Director(s)	Year	Production country
Inner Voices ...A Film About Expression		Peter Lindbergh	1999	USA
La Commune (Paris,1871) Quatre Episodes	The Town (Paris, 1871) Four Episodes	Peter Watkins	1999	France
Sobre Anos 60	About 60s	Jean-Claude Bernardet	2000	Brazil
Tibetan Tao		Allen Fong	2000	Hong Kong

==== Out of Competition ====
Filmmakers of the Present - Out of Competition
Original Title	English Title	Director(s)	Year	Production Country
Ceux D'En Face	Those Opposite	Jean-Daniel Pollet	2000	France
Cités De La Plaine	Cities of the Plain	Robert Kramer	2000	France
Die Königin	The Queen	Werner Schroeter	2000	Germany
El Acordeòn Del Diablo	The Devil's Chord	Stefan Schwieter	2000	Germany, Switzerland
Histoire De Ma Vie Racontée Par Mes Photographies	History of My Life Told by My Photographs	Boris Lehman	2000	Belgium
Inventario Balcanico	Balkan Inventory	Yervant Gianikian, Angela Ricci Lucchi	2000	Italia
Le Salaire De L Artiste	The Artist's Salary	Laurent Veuve, Jacqueline Veuve	2000	Switzerland
Our Song		Jim McKay	1999	USA
Parvaz-E Zanbur	Ledge	Jamshed Usmonov	1998	South Korea, Tadjikistan
Roji-E	Alleys - Illustration	Shinji Aoyama	2000	Japan
Sanyu	Happiness	Robert Frank	2000	Switzerland, USA
Tchoh		Jamshed Usmonov	2000	Tadjikistan, Russia
Time Code		Mike Figgis	2000	USA
Vies		Alain Cavalier	2000	France
Werangstwolf		Clemens Klopfenstein	2000	Switzerland, Italia
Ça, C Est Vraiment Toi	That's Really you	Claire Simon	2000	France

==== Special Session ====
Special Session - Filmmakers of the Present
Original Title	English Title	Director(s)	Year	Production Country
Q Begegnungen Auf Der Milchstrasse	Q Encounters on the Milky Way	Jürg Neuenschwander	2000	Switzerland

=== Out of Competition ===
Out of Competition (Fuori Concorso)

Original Title	English Title	Director(s)	Year	Production Country
Aïe	Ouch	Sophie Fillières	2000	France
Hey Ram		Kamal Haasan	1999	India
Ça Ira Mieux Demain	It will be Better Tomorrow	Jeanne Labrune	2000	France

=== Leopards of Tomorrow ===
Leopards of Tomorrow (Pardi di Domani)

Spain
Original Title	English Title	Director(s)	Year	Production Country
A Violeta	Violet	Maria Salgado Gispert	1998	Spain
Abuelitos	Grandparents	Paco Plaza	1999	Spain
Back Room		Guillem Morales	1999	Spain
Bancos	Banks	Santi Amodeo, Alberto Rodríguez	1999	Spain
Bocamina	Pithead	Javier Codesal	1998	Spain
Bofetada	Slap	Aron Benchetrit	1999	Spain
Chateau De Sable	Sand Chateau	François Rossier	1999	Switzerland
Disertaciones Sobre Una Coliflor	Dissertations on a Cauliflower	Carmen Conesa	1998	Spain
El Cumplido	The Fulfillment	Rafa Russo	1999	Spain
El Equipaje Abierto	Open Luggage	Javier Rebollo	1999	Spain
El Infanticida	The Infanticide	Pilar Ruiz Gutiérrez	1999	Spain
El Paraíso Perdido	The Lost Paradise	Jaime Marques Olarreaga	1999	Spain
El Trabajo	The Work	Igor Legarreta, Emilio Pérez	1999	Spain
En Malas Compañias	In Bad Companies	Antonio Hens	2000	Spain
Endora		Fernando Mainguyagüe	1999	Spain
Hestoria D Un Vezu		Santoz Hevia	2000	Spain, France
Hongos	Fungus	Ramón Salazar Hoogers	1999	Spain
Lalia	Lals	Sílvia Munt	1999	Spain
Lencería De Ocasión	Side Lingerie	Teresa Marcos	1999	Spain
London Calling		Gabriel Velázquez	2000	Spain
Los Cuentos Del Tío Paco	Uncle Paco's Stories	Javier Domingo	1999	Spain
Monde Provisoire	Provisional World	Frederic Choffat, Julie Gilbert	2000	Switzerland
Paraísos Articiales	Artificial Paradises	Achero Mañas	1998	Spain
Ruleta	Roulette	Roberto Santiago	1999	Spain
Sietes Cafés Por Semana	Sietes Cafes per Week	Juana Macías Alba	1999	Spain
Summertime		Anna Luif	2000	Switzerland
Sólo Por Un Tango	Just for a Tango	Toni Bestard, Adán Martín	2000	Spain
Spain - Retrospective
Aguaespejo Granadino	Aguaespejo Granada	José Val del Omar	1955	Spain
Al Mayurka		Augustin Villaronga	1979	Spain
Bolero De Amor	Love Bolero	Francesc Betriu	1970	
Cachorro		Miguel Albaladejo	1996	Spain
El Columpio	The Swing	Álvaro Fernandez Armero	1992	Spain
El Léon Enamorado	The Léon in Love	Fernando Trueba	1979	Spain
El Origen Del Problema	The Origin of the Problem	Alber Ponte	1997	Spain
El Secreto De La Trompeta	The Secret of the Trumpet	Javier Fesser	1995	Spain
Embrujada	Bewitch	José Luis Lonzano	1983	Spain
En Medio De Ninguna Parte	In the Midst of Nowhere	Javier Rebollo	1997	Spain
Frank Stein - Masaje	Frank Stein - Massage	Iván Zuleta	1972	Spain
Huntza	Flish	Antonio Conesa	1992	Spain
Ignacio Zurikalday		Iñaki Núñez	1981	
Imitación Del Ángel	Imitation of the Angel	Adolfo Arrieta	1966	
La Fiesta De Los Locos	The Los Crazy Party	Luis Racionero	1977	Spain
La Gotera	The Gotera	Jorge Sánchez Cabezudo	1996	Spain
La Taquilla	The Box Office	Alvaro Saénz de Heredia	1977	Spain
La Tarde Del Domingo	Sunday Afternoon	Carlos Saura	1957	Spain
La Última Respuesta	The Last Answer	Miguel Olid	1991	Spain
Las Partes De Mí Que Te Aman Son Seres Vacíos	The Parts of Me Who Love you are Empty Beings	Mercedes Gaspar	1995	Spain
Las Que Perdieron	Those that Lost	Pepa Álvarez	1987	Spain
Luciano		Claudio Guerín	1965	Spain
Luna		Alejandro Amenábar	1995	Spain
Luquita		Luis Manuel Carmona	1988	Spain
Masaje	Massage	Ivan Zulueta	1972	
Mejor No Hables	Better Do not Speak	Pedro Paz	1994	Spain
Mirindas Asesinas	Killer Mirindes	Álex de la Iglesia	1990	Spain
No-Do N.1		Auteurs divers	1943	Spain
O Desexo	The Desire	Miguel Castelo	1994	Spain
Pecados Capitales	Capital Sins	Dionisio Pérez Galindo	1995	Spain
Tanata	Assessment	Luis Mamerto López Tapia	1973	Spain
Una De Miedo	One of Fear	Eduardo García Maroto	1935	Spain
Viure Sense Viure	To Live without Living	Carles Mira	1976	Spain
Walter Peralta		Jordi Mollà	1993	Spain
Xicu El Topero	Xicu the Topero	Gonzalo Tapia	1994	Spain
És Tard	It's Late	Marc Recha	1993	Spain
Swiss Confederation
Ade		Benjamin Kempf	2000	Switzerland
Benson And Edges		Reza Rezai	2000	Switzerland
Duel		Philippe Mach	2000	Switzerland
Elisabeth Marquart		Géraldine Chappuis	2000	Switzerland
Just Fire		Marco Canclini	2000	Switzerland
Killing Time		Carlo De Rosa	2000	Switzerland
L Arrivée	The Arrival	Fernand Melgar	2000	Switzerland
La Baie Des Trepasses	Trepasses Bay	Yves Pouliquen	2000	Switzerland
La Bouee	The Mud	Bruno Deville	2000	Switzerland
La Ville De S.	The City of S.	Ulrich Fischer	2000	Switzerland
Lignes De Fuite	Leak Lines	Léo Maillard	2000	Switzerland
Nomina Domini	Names of	Ivan Engler	2000	Switzerland
Time With Nyenne		Olivier Beguin	2000	England, Switzerland
Tout Est Bien	Everything is Good	Vincent Pluss	2000	Switzerland
X Für U	X for U	Alain Gsponer	2000	Germany, Switzerland

=== Retrospective ===
Original Title	English Title	Director(s)	Year	Production Country
Prostitutka	Prostitute	Oleg Frelih	1927	Russia

=== Another Story of Soviet Cinema, 1926 - 1968 ===
Another Story of Soviet Cinema (Une autre Histoire du Cinéma soviétique 1926 - 1968) featured banned Soviet film and un-cut director editions in addition to seven different opening segments of Sergei Eisenstein's Battleship Potemkin. It was also advertised as "The Unknown Forbidden Soviet Cinema 1926 - 67"

Another Story of Soviet Cinema 1926 - 1968
Original Title	English Title	Director(s)	Year	Production Country
Bescennaja Golova (Boyevoy Kinosbornik 10)	A Priceless Head (Boyevoy kinosbornik 10)	Boris Barnet	1942	Russia
Cirk	Circus	Grigori Aleksandrov	1936	Russia
Cvetuoâ¢Naja Junost'		Aleksandr Medvedkin	1939	Russia
Dolgaya schastlivaya zhizn	A Long Happy Life	Gennady Shpalikov	1967	Russia
Dom V Sugrobah	The House in the Snow-Drifts	Fridrikh Ermler	1928	Russia
Yeyo put, Ее путь	Her Way	Aleksandr Strizhak	1929	Russia
Garmon	Accordion	Igor Savchenko	1934	Russia
Gazeta Nâ°4	Gazeta #4	Nikolay Karmazinskiy	1932	Russia
Gibel Sensacii	Gibel Sensaci	Aleksandr Andrievskij	1935	Russia
Graniâ¢A	Border		1935	Russia
Ijul Skij Doâ¿D		Marlen Huciev	1967	Russia
Iz Lebyazhego Soobshchayut	From the Swan is Reported		1960	Russia
Ja Rodom Iz Detstva	I Come from Childhood	Viktor Turov	1966	Russia
Jak Â¿Iveo Tovariou Girnik? (Kak Poâ¿Ivaeo, Tovarioâ¢ Gornjak?)		Nikolay Karmazinskiy	1932	Russia
Jujunas Mzitevi (Pridanoe Jujuni)			1934	Russia
Karnaval Naja Noâ¢			1956	Russia
Kubanskie Kazaki	Kuban Cossacks		1950	Russia
Ljubov I Nenavist	Love and Hatred		1935	Russia
Lëtâ¢Iki			1935	Russia
Maoen Ka		Yuli Raizman	1942	Russia
Mertvyj Dom	Mertvyj House	Vladimir Fëdorov	1932	Russia
Mechta	Dream	Mihail Romm	1941	Russia
Muzykal Naja Istorija	Muzykal Announcement of History	Aleksandr Ivanovskij, Gerbert Rappaport	1940	Russia
Naoestvie		Abram Room	1945	Russia
Odnazhdy Nochyu	Dark is the Night	Boris Barnet	1945	Russia
Ooibka Inâ¿Enera Koâ¢Ina	Engineer Koschin's Error	Aleksandr Macheret	1939	Russia
Organâ¢Ik		Nikolaj Hodataev	1934	Russia
Oâ¢Edroe Leto		Boris Barnet	1950	Russia
Poezd Idët Na Vostok	The Train Goes East	Yuli Raizman	1948	Russia
Proryv			1930	Russia
Rabochiy Posëlok		Vladimir Vengerov	1965	Russia
Saoa Vstupaet V Â¿Izn'		Mihail øveicer	1957	Russia
Saoa Vstupaet V Â¿Izn'		Mihail øveicer	1957	Russia
Serdtsa Chetyryokh	Four Hearts	Konstantin Judin	1941	Russia
Skazanie O Zemle Sibirskoj	The Legend of the Land of Siberian		1948	Russia
Slavnyj Malyj (Novgorodcy)		Boris Barnet	1943	Russia
Slusâ¢Ajnaja Vstreâ¢A			1936	Russia
Stekljannaja Garmonika	The Glass Harmonica	Andrej Khrzhanovsky	1968	Russia
Strogij Junooa	A Strict Junooa		1936	Russia
Svetlyj Put	Bright Path	Grigori Aleksandrov	1940	Russia
Tan Ka - Traktiroâ¢Ica	And Ka - TratcherâIa	Boris Svetozarov	1929	Russia
Tri Pesni O Lenine	Three Songs About Lenin	Dziga Vertov	1935	Russia
Tugoj Uzel	Tight Node	Mihail øveicer	1957	Russia
U Krutogo Jara	The Cool Yar	Aleksandr Mouratov, Kira Muratova	1960	Russia
Ubijcy Vyhodjat Na Dorogu	Killers Go on the Road	Vsevolod Pudovkin	1942	Russia
Ubijcy	The Killers	Andrei Tarkovsky	1959	Russia
V Oest Â¢Asov Veâ¢Era Posle Vojny			1944	Russia
Ver'Te Mne, Ljudi	Ver'te Mne, People		1964	Russia
Veselye Rebjata	Funny Guys	Grigori Aleksandrov	1934	Russia
Vesna		Grigori Aleksandrov	1947	Russia
Volga-Volga		Grigori Aleksandrov	1938	Russia
Zakljuâ¢Ënnye	Concludes ¢nnye	Evgenij Â¢ervjakov	1936	Russia
Â¡H, Jabloâ¢Ko...		Mihail Dollar, Leonid Obolenskij	1926	Russia
Â¢Astnaja Â¿Izn' Pëtra Vinogradova			1935	Russia
Â¿Di Menja		Boris Ivanov, Aleksandr Stolper	1943	Russia
Â¿Iccë Xznjasenne Jurasja Bratâ¢Yka (Â¿Itie I Vosnesenie Jurasja Bratâ¢Yka)	Â· of Xasa's Mustan Nire Éy Who (and · I VEAst's Sons of Junis) .		1968	Russia
Â¿Il-Byl Kozjavin		Andrej HrÂ£anovskij	1966	Russia

=== Kings of the B's ===
Original Title	English Title	Director(s)	Year	Production Country
Ko-Rei		Kiyoshi Kurosawa	1999	Japan
Robert Louis Stevenson S The Suicide Club		Rachel Samuels	1999	USA, Ireland
Un Giudice Di Rispetto	A Judge of Respect	Walter Toschi	2000	Italia

=== Events ===
Original Title	English Title	Director(s)	Year	Production Country
Downtown 81		Edo Bertoglio	2000	USA
Ghosts Of Electricity		Robert Kramer	1997	Switzerland
Milestones + Amore Pedestre	Milestones + Pedestrian Amore	John Douglas, Robert Kramer	1975	USA
Polaroids Chema Prado		Robert Kramer, Chema Prado		Spain

== Independent Sections ==
=== Critics Week ===
The Semaine de la Critique is an independent section, created in 1990 by the Swiss Association of Film Journalists in partnership with the Locarno Film Festival.

Original Title	English Title	Director(s)	Year	Production Country
Amargosa	Bitter	Todd Robinson	1999	USA
Beyond Reason		Marijke Jongbloed	2000	Netherlands
Blue End		Kaspar Kasics	2000	Switzerland
Die Markus Family		Elfi Mikesch	2000	Germany
Do It		Sabine Gisiger, Marcel Zwingli	2000	Switzerland
Hamrah-E Bad	Hamrah-e Bath	Manuchehr Tayab	2000	Iran
München Geheimnisse Einer Stadt	Munich Secrets of a City	Michael Althen, Dominik Graf	2000	Germany

=== Swiss Cinema ===
Swiss Cinema Rediscovered
Original Title	English Title	Director(s)	Year	Production Country
Das Glück Auf Der Landstrasse (Oder Schaggi Der Vagabund)	Happiness on the Country Road (or Schaggi the Vagabund)	Konrad Lips, Fredy Scheim	1939	Switzerland
Der Grosse Zuberkünstler Im Schwarzen Kabinett	The Great Pub in the Black Cabinet	Konrad Lips, Fredy Scheim	1939	Switzerland
Hans Im Glück	Hans in Luck	Hans Richter	1937	Switzerland
Petronella		Hanns Schwarz	1927	Switzerland, Germany

=== Appellation Swiss ===
Original Title	English Title	Director(s)	Year	Production Country
A Synagogue In The Hills		Franz Rickenbach	1999	Switzerland
Der Onkel Vom Meer	The Uncle from the Sea	Marie-Louise Bless	1999	Switzerland
Die Reisen Des Santiago Calatrava	The Trips of the Santiago Calatrava	Christoph Schaub	1999	Switzerland
Exklusiv	Exclusive	Florian Froschmayer	1999	Switzerland
Gespräch Im Gebirg	Conversation in the Mountain Range	Mattias Caduff	2000	Switzerland, Germany
Jonas Et Lila, À Demain	Jonas and Lila, See you Tomorrow	Alain Tanner	1999	Switzerland, France
Komiker	Comedian	Markus Imboden	2000	Switzerland
Zornige Küsse	Angry Kisses	Judith Kennel	1999	Switzerland

== Official Awards ==
=== International Competition ===
- Golden Leopard: Baba directed by Shuo Wang
- Silver Leopard: Xilu Xiang directed by Fruit CHAN, Manila directed by Romuald Karmakar
- Bronze Leopard: Sabine Timoteo in L AMOUR, L ARGENT, L AMOUR directed by Philip Gröning, Ulrike Beimpold, Sonja Romei, Birgit Doll, Joachim Bissmeier, Josef Hader, Roland Düringer in DER ÜBERFALL directed by Florian Flicker
- Official Jury Prize: Gostanza Da Libbiano directed by Paolo Benvenuti
- Special Mention, Official Jury: BRONX-BARBÈS directed by Eliane de Latour, No Quarto Da Vanda directed by Pedro Costa

=== Piazza Grande ===
- Prix du Public UBS: Hollow Man directed by Paul Verhoeven

=== Leopards of Tomorrow Competition ===
- SRG SSR idée Suisse Prize and Egli Film Prize, New Swiss Talents, Leopards of Tomorrow, (Short Films): Summertime directed by Anna Luif
- "Action Light" Prize, New Swiss Talents, Leopards of Tomorrow, (Short Films): Lignes De Fuite directed by Léo Maillard
- Eastman Kodak Company Prize, New Swiss Talents, Leopards of Tomorrow, (Short Films): Tout Est Bien directed by Vincent Pluss
- Special Mention, New Swiss Talents, Leopards of Tomorrow, (Short Films): La Bouee directed by Bruno Deville
- Film und Video Subtitling Prize, Spanish Films, Leopards of Tomorrow, (Short Films): El Trabajo directed by Igor Legarreta and Emilio Pérez
- Special Mention, Spanish Films, Leopards of Tomorrow, (Short Films): En Malas COMPAÑIAS directed by Antonio Hens

=== Youth Jury (Cinema e Gioventù) - Main Competition ===
- First Prize, Youth Jury: No Quarto Da Vanda
- Second Prize, Youth Jury: Baba directed by Shuo Wang, Mua Oi directed by Nhat Minh Dang
- "The environnement is the quality of life" Prize": Cronicamente Inviavel directed by Sérgio Bianchi
- "Euro>26" Prize: 101 Reykjavik directed by Baltasar Kormákur
- Special Mention, Youth Jury: Gostanza Da Libbiano directed by Paolo Benvenuti

=== Youth Jury (Cinema e Gioventù) – Leopards of Tomorrow ===
- Youth Jury Prize, New Swiss Talents, Short Films: Summertime directed by Anna Luif
- Youth Jury Prize, New Spanish Talents, Short Films: Disertaciones Sobre Una Coliflor directed by Carmen Conesa
- Special Mention, Youth Jury, New Spanish Talents, Short Films: Bancos directed by Santi Amodeo and Alberto Rodriguez

=== Video Competition Jury ===
- Video Golden Leopard, Sony Prize: Les Yeux FERMÉS directed by Olivier Py
- Video Silver Leopard, Sony Prize, Long Format: Puisi Tak Terkuburkan directed by Garin Nugroho

=== Ecumenical Jury ===
- Oecumenical Jury Prize: Baba directed by Shuo Wang

=== FIPRESCI Jury ===
- FIPRESCI Prize: Hotaru directed by Naomi Kawase

=== FICC Jury ===
- FICC/IFFS Prize: Mua Oi directed by Nhat Minh Dang
- Special Mention, FICC/IFFS Jury: Baba directed by Shuo Wang, No Quarto Da Vanda directed by Pedro Costa

=== SRG SSR idée suisse/Critic's Prize ===
- SRG SSR idée Suisse Prize, Critics Week: Do It directed by Marcel Zwingli and Sabine Gisiger
- Special Mention, Critics Week: Blue End directed by Kaspar Kasics
