= Mikhail Romadin =

Russian painter and book illustrator

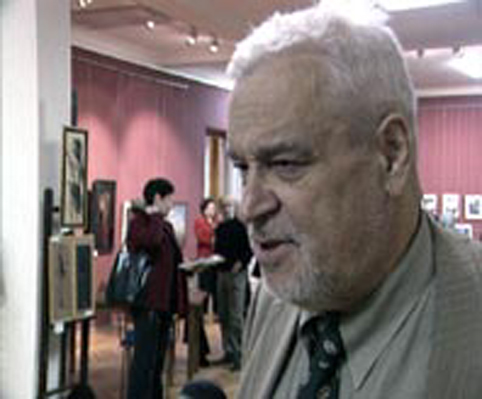
- Born: Russian: Михаил Николаевич Ромадин (Mikhail Nikolayevich Romadin); 12 April 1940; Moscow
- Died: 3 January 2012 (aged 71); Moscow
- Education: All-Union State Institute of Cinematography
- Known for: Painting, Film, Illustration

Mikhail Nikolayevich Romadin (Russian: Михаил Николаевич Ромадин) (12 April 1940 – 3 January 2012) was a Russian painter, book illustrator, movie art designer and theater artist. He graduated from the All-Union State University of Cinematography. He is a third generation artist; his grandfather Mikhail was an artist and his father Nikolay, was a landscape artist and Academician

== Life and career ==
=== Childhood ===
Mikhail Romadin was born on 12 April 1940 in Moscow. His father, the landscape painter Nikolai Romadin, was a student of Falk, Mashkov and Konchalovsky. When Romadin was thirteen he took lessons with Pavel Dmitrievich Korin, and it was at this point that he became attracted to less traditional types of art. He showed his experiments to Altman and Tyshler, and for a long time he was strongly influenced by the works of Picasso, Braque, Legér and other modernists, that he saw at the exhibition of French art that took place in Moscow in 1961.

== Career ==
Mikhail Romadin went on as a young man to attend the Gerasimov University of Cinematography, which he considered to be the higher education institute that offered the most creative freedom to its students. There his best friends and fellow students were the poet Gennady Shpalikov and the director Andrei Tarkovsky. They met every day and between them were overflowing with creative ideas. Romadin thought up the flying machine made out of a sack that figures in Tarkovsky's film Andrei Rublev (1969), and in 1964 he worked as an artist on the film I am Twenty 1965, which was directed by Marlen Khutsiev and written by Marlen Khutsiev and Gennady Shpalikov. He was then the production designer and creator of the style of Tarkovsky's Solaris (1972), after which he went on to work as production designer on three of his friend Andrei Konchalovsky's films, The First Teacher (1964), The Story of Asya Klyachina (1967), and A Nest of Gentlefolk (1969).

Andrei Tarkovsky about Mikhail Romadin:

"Romadin's character is hidden, forced deep inside. In his best works what often happens is that the outward characteristics of barely ordered dynamism and chaos that one perceives initially, melt imperceptibly into the appreciation of calm and noble form, silent and simple. As I see it, this principle contains the highest artistic quality.”

=== Book illustration ===
Mikhail Romadin created illustrations from an early age, and over his life illustrated more than 200 books, including Ray Bradbury's R is for Rocket and The Magic Ring by Andrei Platonov, Tales by Leo Tolstoy, Lion with a white beard by Tonino Guerra – M.Romadin's close friend, and more.

Tonino Guerra about Mikhail Romadin:

"I used to visit Mikhail Romadin regularly. The apartment was full of books, furniture and precariously balanced objects here and there. I was quite worried that it could all collapse on top of me. The paintings, which show innumerable fighting soldiers,

leaves and grass, need an empty expanse of walls. But I didn’t feel suffocated; I felt like an organic part of this labyrinth, in which I discovered fresh air and broad horizons. It’s at this point that you yearn for the quiet life that we are all losing, and which was so dear to him [Romadin]”

The intricacy of dense detail in Romadin's work is striking, and the viewer feels drawn to examine each detail individually; but Romadin's realism is deceptive, and what we see is really closer to surrealism. He achieves this through a cinematic approach, employing close-ups, expressive angles, montage, and a cinematic compositional dynamism. As Romadin said, “A good painting is done from corner to corner, with equal ten-sion in every square centimetre.”

Romadin's works have been exhibited in over 300 solo exhibitions worldwide, from Paris, Geneva and Berlin, to Dallas and Beijing. While taking part in these exhibitions Romadin used to cover entire rolls of paper measuring several metres each with drawings. One critic called him a “drawing machine”.

The works of Mikhail Romadin are in the collections of museums and private collections worldwide.

=== Personal life ===
Parents

Father – Nikolai Mikhailovich Romadin (1903–1987) – famous Russian landscape artist and Academician.

Mother – Nina Gerasimovna Romadina (Shpileva)

Wife

Ekaterina Shein-Romadina, ballet dancer (Moscow State Academy of Choreography- The Bolshoi Ballet Academy), actress (Russian Academy of Theatre Arts), curator of exhibitions on the theme of ballet.

Сhildren

Daughter Aleksandra Shein-Romadina, curator of exhibitions of contemporary art

Stepdaughter Anna Högl, founder of Studio Naegeli Gallery in Gstaad and art space Dreiviertel in Bern (Switzerland)

== Museums and collections ==
- The State Tretyakov Gallery (Moscow)
- The State Historical Museum, (Moscow)
- The State Russian Museum, (St. Petersburg)
- The Museum of Contemporary Art, Chicago (USA)
- Museum P. Ludwig Cologne, (Germany)
- Museum Ludwig P., Aachen, (Germany)
- The Museum “Les Invalides" (Paris)
- The UNESCO Collection (Paris)
- The Cartier Foundation (Paris)
- The Palais des Nations Geneva (Switzerland)
- Collection of the University of Maryland, Washington, D.C. (USA)
- Zimmerli Art Museum New Jersey, (USA)
- The Museums of Texas Fort Worth and Texarkana (USA)
- The Museum of the Berlin Wall at Checkpoint Charlie, (Berlin)
- Museum Ludwig P., Budapest (Hungary)
- The Museum of Cinema (Moscow)
- The Museum of Cosmonautics (Moscow)
- The Museum of the City of (Moscow)
- The Bakhrushi State Theatre Museum (Moscow)
- The Museum of Contemporary Art Seville (Spain)
- The Museum of Oriental Art (Moscow)
- Collection House Museum of Maximilian Voloshin, (Koktebel)
- The Central State Museum of Painting, Kyiv (Ukraine)
- The Museum of Cosmonautics (Kaluga)
- The collections of Peter Ludwig, represented in the museums of Beijing, Cologne, Aachen, Budapest
- The painting “The Indifferent Spectators" is displayed in the conference room used for discussions on nuclear issues of the Palace of the UN in Geneva (Switzerland)
- Works are also held in the collections of many other museums in France, USA, Italy and other countries.
- Private collections exist in Russia, the USA, France, Monaco, Germany, Italy, Belgium, Switzerland, Luxembourg etc.

== Solo exhibitions ==
Romadin's works have been exhibited in over 300 solo exhibitions worldwide, from Paris, Geneva and Berlin to Dallas New-York and Beijing.

== Filmography ==
- The Story of Asya Klyachina (1966) (Russian История Аси Клячиной, которая любила, да не вышла замуж, Istoriya Asi Klyachinoy, kotoraya lyubila, da ne vyshla zamuzh)
- The First Teacher (1966) (Russian Первый учитель, Pervyy uchitel) – Art director, Costume Designer
- A Nest of Gentry (1969) (Russian Дворянское гнездо, Dvoryanskoe gnezdo), dabed on the novel Home of the Gentry – Set designer
- Solaris (1972) (Russian Солярис, Solyaris) Artistic director
