= A Boy and a Girl (1966 film) =

- Russian: Мальчик и девочка
- Directed by: Yuliy Fayt
- Written by: Vera Panova
- Produced by: Tamara Samoznaeva
- Starring: Natalya Bogunova; Nikolay Burlyaev
- Cinematography: Vladimir Chumak
- Edited by: Yevgenia Makhankova
- Music by: Boris Chaikovsky
- Production company: Lenfilm
- Release date: 1966
- Running time: 74 min.
- Country: Soviet Union
- Language: Russian

A Boy and a Girl (Russian: Мальчик и девочка, romanized: Malchik i devochka) is a 1966 Soviet drama film directed by Yuliy Fayt. The film was at the center of controversies at the time of filming and upon its release.

A young tourist meets a girl on the seashore and they fall in love. But soon the boy leaves. Later, the girl gives birth to a child.

== Plot ==
The story follows a young boy who, after graduating from school, travels to Crimea on a vacation package and stays at a local sanatorium. During his stay, he meets a charming and attractive girl his age, who works as a waitress. Their connection blossoms quickly, and on their first date, they share a kiss. A romance develops as they spend their days going on walks, swimming in the sea, and enjoying their carefree summer together. However, the vacation comes to an end, and the boy must return to Moscow. Though she is heartbroken by their separation, he promises to write to her.

Months pass—one, two, three—but she receives no letters from him. Meanwhile, the girl discovers that she is pregnant with his child. Back in Moscow, the boy struggles to write to her, sitting down several times to compose a letter, only to discard each attempt in frustration. In the southern town, the girl gives birth to their child. Left alone, she faces the challenges of single motherhood, overwhelmed by a sense of loneliness and despair.

== Cast ==
- Natalya Bogunova as girl
- Nikolay Burlyaev as boy
- Antonina Bendova as Tanya
- Tamara Konovalova as Nadya
- Pavel Kormunin as game director
- Valentina Chemberg as nurse
- Lyudmila Shagalova as woman in kimono
- Yelizaveta Uvarova as nurse in maternity home
- Larisa Burkova as waitress
- Nikolay Gubenko as passenger with guitar
- Pyotr Gorin as father
- Pavel Kashlakov as Petya
- Ivan Kuznetsov as colonel
- Vera Lipstok as mother
- Lyubov Malinovskaya as colonel's wife
- Inna Gulaya as girl (voice)
- Gennady Shpalikov as man with a samovar (uncredited)
