= Life on Holidays =

- Russian: Из жизни отдыхающих
- Directed by: Nikolai Gubenko
- Written by: Nikolai Gubenko
- Starring: Regimantas Adomaitis; Zhanna Bolotova; Georgi Burkov; Rolan Bykov; Anatoly Solonitsyn
- Cinematography: Alexander Knyazhinsky
- Music by: Isaac Schwartz
- Release date: 1980
- Country: Soviet Union
- Language: Russian

Life on Holidays (Russian: Из жизни отдыхающих) is a 1980 Soviet romantic drama film directed by Nikolai Gubenko.

== Plot ==
The film takes place in the autumn in the south of Crimea. The boarding house brought together people who are forced to entertain themselves. Among them were Nadezhda Andreyevna and Aleksey Sergeyevich, who fell in love with each other.

== Cast ==
- Regimantas Adomaitis as Aleksey Sergeyevich Pavlishchev
- Zhanna Bolotova as Nadezhda Andreyevna
- Georgi Burkov as Arkady Pavlovich
- Rolan Bykov as Viktor Leonidovich Lisyutkin
- Anatoly Solonitsyn as Tolik Chikin
- Lidiya Fedoseeva-Shukshina as Oksana
- Mariya Vinogradova as Margo / Margarita Serafimovna
- Viktor Filippov as Tractor-driver
- Mikheil Kherkheulidze as Mikheil Kherkheulidze
- Tamara Yakobson as Olga Nikolaevna
- Rezo Esadze
