= Bonivur's Heart =

1969 Soviet historical film

- Written by: Andrey Shemshurin
- Directed by: Mark Orlov
- Starring: Lev Prygunov
- Music by: Oscar Sandler; Dmitri Klebanov
- Country of origin: Soviet Union
- Original language: Russian

Production
- Producer: Boris Zholkov
- Cinematography: Vadim Vereshchak
- Editor: Tamara Serdyuk
- Running time: 244 minutes
- Production company: Dovzhenko Film Studios

Original release
- Release: 21 October – 25 October 1969

Bonivur's Heart (Russian: Сердце Бонивура, romanized: Serdtse Bonivura) is a 1969 Soviet four-part historical-revolutionary film about the establishment of Soviet power in the Russian Far East and Primorsky Krai directed by Mark Orlov.

== Plot ==
Vladivostok in 1922. The underground workers escaped the arrested counterintelligence comrades. Among the organizers is the Komsomol member Vitaly Bonivur, for whose head a large reward is appointed.

Bonivur himself for surname Antonov, settles in the railway depot and agitates the workers to sabotage military supplies. In the workshops are almost ready cars of the Japanese armored train. Bonivour, with the help of repairmen, sets fire to the compound, placing explosives under the fuel tank.

After a successful action, the urban underground goes into the taiga to the partisans. Under the guise of the villagers, young people from the Toporkov detachment are making a daring raid on the neighboring village where the whites stand. In sight of a drunken guard, they kidnapped the officer along with the paramedic, and took them to the base.

The commander of the guerrillas receives an order to join up with other detachments, in order to consolidate the forces on the eve of the offensive of the People’s Revolutionary Army. A small group of defenders remained on the spot. Taking this opportunity, the Cossack hundred, at the denunciation of the escaped paramedic, moved to the location of the partisan detachment and, after an unequal battle, captured the village.

The local residents who helped the partisans and the delegates of the congress of the poor held at the same time were subjected to execution. White tied up Bonivur and a captive with a weapon in the hands of an elderly communist and took them along. The cavalry sent in pursuit did not manage to help out the comrades. After cruel torture, the prisoners were executed by the retreating Cossacks.

== Cast ==
- Lev Prygunov as Vitaly Bonivur
- Boris Chirkov as Storozhenkov
- Ivan Pereverzev as Zhilin, an old peasant
- Viktor Korshunov as Boris Lyubansky
- Pyotr Glebov as captain Karayev
- Maya Bulgakova as Glafira Nasedkina
- Vladimir Yemelyanov as Bagrov
- Yuri Lavrov as Mikhail Diterikhs

== Release ==
In February 1971 a two-part film version was released on the screen with a timing of 157 minutes.
