= Wounded Game =

1977 film

- Original French film poster
- Directed by: Nikolai Gubenko
- Written by: Nikolai Gubenko
- Starring: Juozas Budraitis; Aleksandr Kalyagin; Zhanna Bolotova; Rolan Bykov; Bukhuti Zaqariadze; Evgeni Evstigneev
- Cinematography: Alexander Knyazhinsky
- Production company: Mosfilm
- Release date: 20 June 1977
- Running time: 93 minutes
- Country: Soviet Union
- Language: Russian

Wounded Game (Russian: Подранки, romanized: Podranki, also released on video in the US as The Orphans) is a 1977 Soviet drama film directed by Nikolai Gubenko. It was entered into the 1977 Cannes Film Festival.

The film tells the story of a writer who returns to his wartime childhood city to uncover the fates of his estranged siblings, reliving a harsh past of loss, survival, and fractured family bonds amid the lingering shadows of war.

== Plot ==
The film opens with an epigraph quoting the writer Alexander Tvardovsky: "Children and war—there is no more horrifying convergence of opposites in the world."

Writer Alexey Bartenev returns to the city where he spent his childhood. Having grown up in an orphanage after losing his parents during the war—his father died on the front lines, and his mother took her own life when Alexey was still an infant—he embarks on a quest to reconnect with his past. His search centers on finding his two brothers, whom he does not remember. Through archival records, he uncovers the fate of his siblings. His sister, Natasha, died in 1947. His older brothers were adopted by different families: Sergey Pogartsev became a habitual criminal and was serving his third prison sentence when Alexey found him. Meanwhile, Denis Kuskov, the middle brother, was adopted by a high-ranking Party official and grew up in relative comfort, unlike the rest of his family.

Natasha had once visited Denis but experienced a cold reception, the details of which she chose not to share with Alexey. When Alexey attempted to meet Denis himself, Denis feigned ignorance of their connection. Years later, as an adult, Denis admitted that he remembered everything and expressed regret for his behavior.

The film recounts Alexey's fragmented memories of a harsh post-war childhood in Odessa. Scenes include Alexey, pretending to be mute, teaming up with a group of street children and his sister Natasha to trade a stolen gramophone for a piece of bread. In another episode, the children attempt to steal food from an apartment by distracting a woman with a chicken. Natasha provides the diversion while Alexey sneaks into the apartment via the balcony. However, a neighbor who is a policeman catches Alexey and turns him over to a state shelter for orphans. Determined to stay together, Natasha voluntarily joins her brother in the orphanage.

The film concludes with a voiceover reading excerpts from Gennady Shpalikov's poem "By Misfortune or by Happiness," capturing the somber tone of Alexey’s story and the lasting scars of war and loss.

== Cast ==
- Juozas Budraitis
- Aleksandr Kalyagin
- Zhanna Bolotova
- Rolan Bykov
- Bukhuti Zaqariadze
- Evgeni Evstigneev
- Aleksei Cherstvov
- Nikolai Gubenko
- Georgi Burkov as Sergei Pogartsev
- Natalya Gundareva
- Olga Strogova
- Pantelejmon Krymov
- Zoya Yevseyeva
- Daniil Netrebin
- Lyudmila Shagalova
