= Clouds Over Borsk =

1960 film

- Russian: Тучи над Борском
- Directed by: Vasili Ordynsky
- Written by: Semyon Lungin; Ilya Nusinov
- Starring: Inna Gulaya; Roman Khomyatov; Vladimir Ivashov; Natalya Antonova; Viktor Rozhdestvenskiy
- Cinematography: Igor Slabnevich
- Music by: Aleksey Muravlyov
- Release date: 1960
- Country: Soviet Union
- Language: Russian

Clouds Over Borsk (Russian: Тучи над Борском) is a 1960 Soviet drama film directed by Vasili Ordynsky.

The film tells about a lonely schoolgirl who decided to join the Pentecostal sect.

== Plot ==
In the provincial settlement of Borsk, Kira Sergeyevna, a young physics teacher fresh out of university, arrives to start her career. Assigned to manage a challenging ninth-grade class of "war children" — independent yet emotionally immature teens — she encounters a variety of personal and societal struggles among her students. One of them, Olya Ryzhkova, lives with her distant, workaholic father and seeks solace in public service as a Pioneer leader. However, her official duties leave her yearning for genuine, heartfelt connections. Olya initially finds a confidante in Kira Sergeyevna, but their friendship falters when the teacher, wary of professional boundaries, retreats into a strictly formal relationship. Heartbroken, Olya withdraws from school life, feeling increasingly isolated and desperate for understanding. This leads her to an unlikely bond with her aloof classmate, Mitya Saenko, a devout Pentecostal orphan, who introduces her to his religious sect. Drawn to their sense of community and emotional solidarity, Olya becomes deeply involved, abandoning her previous life and even alienating her father.

The sect’s influence over Olya grows as her school and family ties weaken. Kira Sergeyevna investigates the group, uncovering manipulative practices and confronting their leaders in an effort to expose their hypocrisy. Meanwhile, Mitya, emboldened by his faith, openly begins preaching, further entrenching Olya in the sect’s rituals. The climax occurs when the sect, interpreting Olya’s personal struggles as a sin of pride, decides to enact a symbolic crucifixion. However, thanks to the intervention of a fellow student, Gena Bocharnikov, the townspeople arrive in time to rescue her. The story concludes with Kira’s efforts to bring the truth to light and Olya’s narrow escape, leaving an impactful commentary on isolation, vulnerability, and the search for belonging in a rapidly changing world.

== Cast ==
- Inna Gulaya as Olya Ryzhkova
- Roman Khomyatov as Mitya Sayenko
- Vladimir Ivashov as Genka
- Natalya Antonova as Kira Sergeyevna
- Viktor Rozhdestvenskiy as Principal (as V. Rozhdestvenskiy)
- Pyotr Konstantinov as Olya's Father
- Pyotr Lyubeshkin as Bocharnikov
- Valentina Belyaeva as Mitya's Aunt
- Evgeniy Teterin as Artemiy Nikolayevich
- Anna Troitskaya as Melan'ya (as A. Troitskaya)
- Inna Churikova as Rayka
- Igor Okhlupin as German
- Gennadi Krasheninnikov as Obishkin
- Nikita Mikhalkov
