= Room and a Half =

- Directed by: Andrei Khrzhanovsky
- Written by: Yuri Arabov; Andrei Khrzhanovsky
- Produced by: Andrei Khrzhanovsky; Artyom Vasilyev
- Starring: Alisa Freindlich; Sergei Yursky; Grigoriy Dityatkovsky
- Narrated by: Veniamin Smekhov
- Cinematography: Vladimir Brylyakov
- Production company: School Studio Shar
- Distributed by: Cinecliq (Russia); Seagull Films (USA)
- Release date: 2009
- Running time: 130 minutes
- Country: Russia
- Language: Russian

Room and a Half (Russian: Полторы комнаты, или сентиментальное путешествие на родину, romanized: Poltory komnaty, ili sentimental'noye puteshestviye na rodinu) is a 2009 Russian biographical film. It won three Nika Awards, including Best Film, Best Director (Khrzhanovsky) and Best Screenplay. It also received the Best Film award in the East of the West section at the Karlovy Vary International Film Festival.

== Plot ==
The film is a fictionalized account of writer Joseph Brodsky. Much of the action incorporates animation to create an ethereal feeling. Director Khrzhanovsky stated The Nose or the Conspiracy of Mavericks is a sequel to the Room and a Half. A third sequel is planned that will unite all the films into a future trilogy.

== Cast ==
- Alisa Freindlich as Mother
- Sergei Yursky as Father
- Grigoriy Dityatkovsky as Joseph Brodsky
  - Artem Smola as Young Joseph Brodsky
- Svetlana Kryuchkova as Anna Akhmatova
- Yevgeny Rein as Himself
  - Aleksandr Bargman as Young Yevgeny Rein
- Sergey Dreyden as Brodsky's uncle
- Igor Golovin and Alexei Devotchenko as Dmitri Shostakovich
- Aleksandr Lenkov as Cat
- Sergei Bakovskiy as Benkendorf
- Anatoliy Gorin as Drunk Passerby
- Sergei Russkin as Denisov, a Witness
- Vadim Lobanov as Witness
- Stanislav Sokolov as Roommate
- Antonina Vvedenskaya as Roommate
- Aleksandra Kulikova as Girl at the Party
- Dmitri Khoronko as Guy at the Party
- Danil Lavrenov as Pushkin
- Andrey Khrzhanovskiy

== Reception ==
Room and a Half has an approval rating of 94% on review aggregator website Rotten Tomatoes, based on 16 reviews, and an average rating of 7.6/10. Metacritic assigned the film a weighted average score of 76 out of 100, based on 5 critics, indicating "generally favorable reviews".
