= The Nose or the Conspiracy of Mavericks =

- From left: Sergei Eisenstein, Vsevolod Meyerhold, Major Kovalyov, Dmitri Shostakovich, Nikolai Gogol
- Directed by: Andrei Khrzhanovsky
- Screenplay by: Nikolai Gogol (story); Yuri Arabov; Andrei Khrzhanovsky
- Based on: The Nose by Nikolai Gogol; The Nose by Dmitri Shostakovich
- Produced by: Andrey Khrzhanovsky; Anna Ostalskaya
- Cinematography: Andrey Khrzhanovsky
- Edited by: Taissia Krugovykh; Ilya Tomashevich
- Music by: Dmitri Shostakovich
- Animation by: Marina Azizyan; Alexandra Pavlova; Alexander Khramtsov; Anastasiya Sembon; Varya Yakovleva
- Layouts by: Igor Skidan-Bosin
- Production company: School-Studio "Shar"
- Release dates: 27 January 2020 (IFFR); 11 March 2021 (Russia)
- Running time: 89 minutes
- Country: Russia
- Language: Russian

The Nose or the Conspiracy of Mavericks (Russian: Нос, или Заговор «нетаких», romanized: Nos, ili Zagovor "Netakih") is a 2020 Russian animated film. The film is created by the animation studio School-Studio "Shar". People's Artist of Russia animator, Andrei Khrzhanovsky directed the film. The film is based on the Russian classic, The Nose by Nikolai Gogol. The script writers Yuri Arabov and Andrei Khrzhanovsky adapted the 19th-century prose of Gogol as well as the verses of the opera of the same name by Dmitri Shostakovich into an animated film featuring a mixture of drawings, cut-outs, live-action, and documentary style filming.

The film has been in intermittent production stages since the 1970s with the film's soundtrack using the opera by Shostakovich. The film premiered in Russia at the Open Russian Film Festival Kinotavr on 11 September 2020. The film received the prestigious Jury Prize at the 2020 Annecy International Animation Film Festival. The film released theatrically in Russia on 11 March 2021.

== Plot ==
At an airport tarmac, an Aeroflot lifts off. Onboard are major proponents of Russian theater and cinema. Each individual watches a different classic at the in-flight entertainment TV. As the camera glides past each individual, different epochs are melded into a single meta narrative. Nikolai Gogol arrives at St. Petersburg, circa 1828. He begins writing The Nose. Then in the 1920s, Dmitri Shostakovich is working on an adaptation of Gogol’s novella. He meets Vsevolod Meyerhold. The prospect of a collaboration begins to take shape.

Major Kovalyov introduces himself. He is looking for the Nose that he lost. The Nose takes a life of its own. It is seen wearing glasses and travels in a luxury car. An opera at the Bolshoi theatre playing a Bulgakov piece is attended by Stalinist accomplices including official Zhdanov. The entourage attended because of a letter sent by the playwright himself, complaining of a lack of the patronage of the arts. However, cacophony starts a day later as Muddle Instead of Music editorial is written in the Pravda newspaper that intends to target Meyerhold and Shostakovich. Part 3 starts with the story of the Vsevolod Meyerhold and in general the story of many writers, scientists, and artists under an authoritarian government.

== Production ==
=== Development ===
The film is inspired by the short story The Nose by Nikolai Gogol and the opera of the same name by Dmitri Shostakovich. Their works presented avant-garde ideas that intrigued the public. However, the works especially the opera received meager publicity during the Stalinist government of the 1920s. By 1960s, the Soviet Union during the Krushchev Thaw, decided to adapt a cinematic rendition of the short story. Andrei Khrzhanovsky was noted as the ideal director for such an adaptation.

A combination of censorship and correspondence with prominent patrons of the arts of the Soviet Union from Meyerhold's family to Shostakovich gave impetus for director Andrei Khrzhanovsky to create a cinematic film about liberal arts and its relationship to society. Even despite the Thaw time period, Khrzhanovsky's 1968 short film Glass Harmonica was censored by the government. The initial idea for the film only started through coincidence. At a coincidental meeting in the street with cameraman Zhenya Chukovsky, who was the son-in-law of Dmitri Shostakovich, director Khrzhanovsky was able to establish a connection with composer Shostakovich. Director Khrzhanovsky pitched the idea of adapting the composer's opera The Nose in a cinematic format. Shostakovich at the hospital bed sent reply back through a postcard to the director stating authorization to use the opera as the soundtrack for the film.

The first time Khrzhanovsky heard of the full version of the opera The Nose was at a 1974 play rendered by the composer Gennady Rozhdestvensky. Thereafter the director developed the concept of a film that at first became a tribute to Vsevolod Meyerhold through the script The Transformation Machine that became more formalized after the release of the 2008 film Room and a Half. Composer Shostakovich used to write music for Meyerhold in the early 1900s whose Soviet Union plays violated the regulations of Stalin's government. The script writing team in collaboration by Yuri Arabov continued to recognize the pattern of the repression of the arts that were also found in the symbolism of the play The Nose. At a session in Kinotavr, critics noted the developing script needed more refinements with request to remove Meyerhold's story. The director rewrote the play and focused more on The Nose adaptations. At some point in time of the production, the project was consulted by a host of acclaimed leaders of cinematography. The final script synthesized into the animated exhibition The Nose or the Conspiracy of Mavericks. The director noted Gogol's works are like natural-made storyboards for animated films.

The script describes the innovators and mavericks in arts and science from the twentieth and twenty-first century who came at the crossroads of authoritarian societies. Condensed into three parts with an adaptation that included Antiformalist Rayok, the script references an unprecedented meeting of such people as Sergei Eisenstein, Vsevolod Meyerhold, Bulgakov, Gogol and Stalin. Developed as a farcical drama, allusions to other artists are made such as Surikov, Picasso, and Kazimir Malevich. By the end of the third act, the script became a tribute to the Soviet artists.

The inspiration for converging the time periods of the two centuries that the film presented, came when the director was on a flight. Many bright screens of the airplane played different movies of different eras and countries despite the cabin room being closed off from light. The director was inspired by this event to create a multi-screen collage approach to edit and combine different fragments and stories with stylistic switching. Media compared the film to the 2001 film Russian Ark.

=== Themes ===
The Nose developed the concept of Russian pictorial realism. As Khrzhanovsky stated, Gogol is one of the founders of realism and surrealism. Therefore, the creators of the film tried to evoke the Russian avant-garde semblance to the original work for the animated film. The film tried to re-order the discordant chronological events in the same way a museum orders the culture and heritage "into a coherent, intelligible whole." Without limited to the space and time of historical discontinuity, the film uses the cinematic space to join creative forces of history into a polyphony medium.

The director states the film is a can be categorized as an auteur artistic exposition film. The film is intended for an educated audience who understands the relations of the government and culture over the decades. The director also states the film has can't be limited to one genre. The film has the elements of drama, musical, and biographical film.

The film explores politics and history through animation. The events described are based on real life events. The character Nose depicted as a living monument, is developed as a totalitarian symbol. A review noted the separation of the Nose from its owner is denoted as a means for a new frontier for direction. The face of Major Kovalyov becomes flat as a pancake after the separation that becomes an allegory to possibilities for new point of reference. The film's conflict explores the Nose and in general the oppression of the arts during the initial years of the Soviet Union by the reference to the editorial Muddle Instead of Music written by the leader of the Soviet Union, Stalin himself in the Soviet newspaper Pravda.

=== Animation ===
The animation team drew the film using cut-outs, drawings, and live-action collages to bring to life the phantasmagoria sequences of the script. They used stop motion to move the cut-out designs. A review found that animation was the only technique that can put to life The Nose. Collage animation is the main technique used for the film as it juxtaposes anecdotes with a document or a newsreel with a painting. Character outlines are glued with daguerreotype faces.

=== Soundtrack ===
As news of a possible Andrei Khrzhanovsky adaptation of The Nose reached the public media in 1969, composer Dmitri Shostakovich personally sent a postcard to the director stating authorization to use the opera The Nose as the soundtrack for the film. Compiled in 1920s, the opera was put on the shelves after censure from the Stalin authorities. However, in the year 1969, the opera at the Bolshoi theater as well as the literary novel by Gogol received critical acclaim again. The soundtrack of the film uses Dmitri Shostakovich's operatic score. A review found the musical aspect of the film became so convincing that it could be seen as a separate part of the film.

== Release ==
=== Theatrical ===
In 2020, the film debuted at the International Film Festival in Rotterdam. After a circuit of film festival expositions, the film was released in Russia on 11 September 2020 as the opener for the 31st the Open Russian Film Festival Kinotavr. The film received the Jury Prize, the second highest distinction of the 2020 Annecy International Animation Film Festival. The award became Russia's first such award in the history of Russian animation. On 12 December 2020, the film was nominated for the European Film Academy that competed alongside only three other animated films. On 4 December 2020, the Arctic Open Film Festival in Arkhangelsk held a screening of the film as part of the "retrospective of the classic of Russian animation" program. The 45th Hong Kong International Film Festival hosted the film at the "Animation Unlimited" section.

The 93rd Academy Awards nominated the film into its long list for Animated Feature. Since then, the film has been noted by media such as Cartoon Brew as a possible contender for the award with high momentum. Originally nominated as Nos Ili Zagovor Ne Takikh, the name has been updated to Nose or the Conspiracy of Mavericks.

A theatrical art release started in Russia on 11 March 2021. An Italian release has been announced as well.

== Reception ==
=== Critical response ===
Stas Tyrkin states the film is a "symbiosis of cinematic genres." The review stated, "allowing the improbable to take place - creative alliances and human encounters-for example, Gogol, Meyerhold and Shostakovich. Khrzhanovsky boldly mixes formats, painting genres and techniques - he comes out with a radical and cool collage that combines the seemingly incongruous - the aesthetics of Russian pictorial realism and revolutionary futurism."

Kino Teatr stated, "The musical side of the film becomes so winning that at some point it literally separates from the visual series and hovers over a slightly chaotic plot that mixes Imperial Petersburg and limousines, Naum Kleiman and Bratkov from the nineties, Stalin and his inner circle with Nabokov and Aeroflot planes, Anton Dolin and Volga boatmen in one cauldron." Veronika Khlebnikova reviewed, "In Khrzhanovsky's film, iconic figures of the Russian cultural code are placed in an eccentric collage. The latter, in turn, becomes an element of avant-garde theater and the principle of theatrical constructivism embodied by Meyerhold. In his play The Earth Stands on End (1923)."

Anton Dolin believes the film isn't movie but is instead an exposition of music and literature: "Khrzhanovsky's utopian plane, in which his friends and like-minded people gathered, where everyone has their own movie and their own freedom on the screen, soars in the air like a bird or an impossible machine with a perpetual motion machine. And it's not going to land." French Annecy review by Mathieu Le Bihan remarked the film is a unique form of animation: "It deviates from the beaten path and plays with eras to better develop them on the screen." Film.ru review thought although the film has "ideological heaviness" that is possibly probably due to its lengthy production, the film is "full of anachronisms and references meta-narrative." One such anachronism that the review pointed out was when a 19th-century bureaucrat "runs an old pen on a graphic tablet, displaying words in Microsoft Word." Denis Stupnikov review for Intermedia stated the direction for the Muddle instead of Music segment was where the direction wasn't up to perfection as the "collage technique does not allow the director to rise above the fray."

PM Cicchetti of Filmexplorer states the film is a postmodern collage/catalogue of "smattering of images, styles, media, from across the centuries." The film is "layer upon layer, mixed-in rather than overlaid, its animation burbles with allusions: each frame a nod, a wink, as tides of images wash over the viewer." Oliver Armknecht review for Film-rezensionen review believed Shar Studio "had fun with the design." The review also stated, "Optics is one of the great strengths anyway: The Nose or Conspiracy of Mavericks uses a variety of techniques, but especially those of Cutout Animation. This special form of the Stop-Motion process uses cut-out paper figures that are moved." Little Big Animation review stated why the nose is given such importance, "Art is to politics what the nose is to the face. Essential, essential and revealing meaning." The film is like a "pop-up book, proving to be a history of Russian art." Sule Durmazkeser of Out Now from Germany gave the film 4.5/5 stars stating, "The Nose or the Conspiracy of Mavericks is an elaborately staged animated film, whereby much emphasis has been placed on details. The film is cleverly constructed and offers a huge variety of information with countless quotations from art, culture, history and politics."

=== Accolades ===
Award	Date of ceremony	Category	Recipient(s) and nominee(s)	Result
International Film Festival Rotterdam	1 February 2020	Perspectives	The Nose or Conspiracy of Mavericks	Nominated
Annecy International Animation Film Festival	15 June 2020	Jury Prize	The Nose or Conspiracy of Mavericks	Won
Open Russian Film Festival Kinotavr	11 September 2020	Outstanding Contribution to Cinema	Andrei Khrzhanovsky	Honored
Ottawa International Animation Festival	23 September 2020	Feature Film	The Nose or Conspiracy of Mavericks	Honorable Mention
Haifa Film Festival	3 October 2020	East of the West	The Nose or Conspiracy of Mavericks	Nominated
Cinanima	9 November 2020	Best Feature Film	The Nose or Conspiracy of Mavericks	Won
European Film Awards	12 December 2020	Best Animated Film	The Nose or Conspiracy of Mavericks	Nominated
Suzdalfest	17 March 2021	Grand Prix	Andrei Khrzhanovsky	Won
Suzdalfest	17 March 2021	Breakthrough (Note: Alexander Tatarsky Prize of masters "Breakthrough")	Andrei Khrzhanovsky	Won
Asia Pacific Screen Awards	11 November 2021	Best Animated Feature Film	The Nose or Conspiracy of Mavericks	Won

== Potential Sequel ==
Director Khrzhanovsky states The Nose could be part of a future trilogy with the film being the sequel to A Room and a Half. A third installment is being planned with the script recently finished. On 1 December 2020 the trilogy film titled Through the Magic Crystal was confirmed. The film is a continuation of The Nose or Conspiracy of Mavericks in terms of creativity and research.
