= Alexander Knyazhinsky =

Soviet and Russian cinematographer (1936–1996)

Alexander Leonidovich Knyazhinsky (Russian: Александр Леонидович Княжинский; 24 January 1936 – 14 June 1996), also spelt Aleksandr Knyazhinskiy, was a Soviet and Russian cinematographer, noted for his work on Andrei Tarkovsky's Stalker.

He was made a People's Artist of Russia in 1992.

== Selected filmography ==
- The City of Masters (1965)
- You and Me (1971)
- Autumn (1974)
- Wounded Game (1977)
- Stalker (1979)
- Life on Holidays (1980)
- If to Believe Lopotukhin... (1983)
