= When the Trees Were Tall =

1961 film by Lev Kulidzhanov

- 1962 When the Trees Were Tall poster by Vilen Karakashev and Liliya Levshunova
- Directed by: Lev Kulidzhanov
- Written by: Nikolai Figurovsky
- Produced by: Lev Kulidzhanov
- Starring: Yuri Nikulin; Inna Gulaya; Vasily Shukshin; Leonid Kuravlyov
- Cinematography: Valeri Ginzburg
- Edited by: Natalya Loginova
- Music by: Leonid Afanasyev
- Release date: 1961
- Running time: 95 minutes
- Country: Soviet Union
- Language: Russian

When the Trees Were Tall (Russian: Когда деревья были большими, translit. Kogda derevya byli bolshimi) is a 1961 Soviet romantic drama film directed by Lev Kulidzhanov. The film was screened at the 1962 Cannes Film Festival.

This film happened to be one of the first for Yuri Nikulin. This was also one of the most significant role for the career of Inna Gulaya, who played the female lead in the film. It was also Lydmila Chursina's debut film.

== Plot ==
After losing his wife during World War II Veteran Kuzma Kuzmich Iordanov does not work, drinks alcohol, makes his living by doing odd jobs. From time to time the Police department calls him in to shame him and threaten him with jail time because of his "parasitic" lifestyle, but all this does not bother him much.

One day Kuzma agrees to help an old lady to deliver a washing machine to her house, (there used to be different fees for doing do – if the building had an elevator – there would be one price for it, if there was not one – then it would cost you more money to deliver it as it requires more time and effort) and accidentally drops it. While running down the stairs, trying to catch it, he stumbles and gets hurt and sent to the hospital. The same old lady that he was delivering the washing machine for comes and visits him. He gets scared thinking she came to be paid for the broken washing machine, but it turns out, she only wanted to see if he was alright. As they talk she tells him her life story, as well as the story about one poor orphan child Natasha from her village. Kuzma, overcome with loneliness, decides to go out there and try to pretend to be Natasha's father.

Natasha indeed believes him to be her father, and takes him in. It turns out she is his exact opposite: independent, dependable, hardworking, but lonely like him. At first they don't get along too well, but soon Kuzma, inspired by her, changes his old ways.

Natasha is reading an article (49:09) from a U.S. newspaper that describes a Freedom Riders demonstration where James Zwerg was thrown off the bus and his face was smashed against the hot concrete of the road.

== Cast ==
- Inna Gulaya as Natasha
- Yuri Nikulin as Kuzma Kuzmich Iordanov
- Leonid Kuravlyov as Lenka
- Yekaterina Mazurova as Anastasiya Borisovna
- Vasily Shukshin as Chairman of the Kolkhoz
- Lyudmila Chursina as Zoya
- Yelena Korolyova as Nyurka
- Viktor Pavlov
- Vera Orlova

== Critical reception ==
Howard Thompson of The New York Times called the film "an odd, fumbling drama" and thought the hero was "the most negative, ground-down and dull protagonist the Soviet Union has sent us in a long time." He added, "Furthermore, the simple story line slides its course crabwise, wedged in between oblique, pretentious photography – some of it fetchingly pastoral – and splintered, meaningless vignettes."

== Awards and nominations ==
The film was nominated for the Palme d'Or at the 1962 Cannes Film Festival.
