= Shore Leave (1962 film) =

Shore leave
- Russian: Увольнение на берег
- Directed by: Feliks Mironer
- Written by: Feliks Mironer
- Produced by: Viktor Slonimsky
- Starring: Ariadna Shengelaya; Lev Prygunov; Vladimir Vysotsky
- Cinematography: Yuri Zubov
- Edited by: Esfir Tobak
- Music by: Kirill Molchanov
- Production company: Mosfilm
- Release date: 1962
- Running time: 88 min.
- Country: Soviet Union
- Language: Russian

Shore Leave (Russian: Увольнение на берег, romanized: Uvolnenie na bereg) is a 1962 Soviet teen romance film directed by Feliks Mironer.

Sailor Nikolai Valezhnikov went south to the port city and spent there one day, for which he spoke with many people and met a woman with whom he fell in love and who fell in love with him.

== Plot ==
Sailor Nikolai Valezhnikov from the Donbass is serving in Sevastopol. One day, he is granted shore leave. His friend Pyotr, who does not receive leave, asks Nikolai to deliver a message to his girlfriend, Zhenya, informing her that he will not be able to meet her. At the arranged meeting spot, Nikolai cannot find Zhenya and ends up calling her name. A woman, Zhenya Efremova, responds, and it turns out she has indeed been waiting for Pyotr. Nikolai assumes she is deeply upset by Pyotr’s absence.

During their conversation, Nikolai learns that Zhenya works as a postal worker and has lost 300 rubles of government money, which could lead to serious consequences for her. Determined to help, Nikolai spends the day with Zhenya, trying to raise the money through a series of unexpected and adventurous methods. Over the course of the day, Nikolai begins to fall in love with Zhenya, while worrying about how he will explain the situation to his friend.

In the evening, Nikolai takes Zhenya to the sailors' club, where their comrades are dancing, in the hope of collecting some money. There, it is revealed that Zhenya Efremova is not the girlfriend of his friend Pyotr, but instead a friend of another sailor named Pyotr. By coincidence, she had sent a note to this Pyotr asking for help and arranged to meet him at the same spot, but he had simply ignored her.

By the end of the night, most of the money has been collected, with the remaining sum to arrive the next morning via a postal transfer from Nikolai's mother. Nikolai escorts Zhenya to her apartment, where they discover that a district police officer has left her a summons. Believing it to be related to her boss filing a complaint, the two head to the police station. After a tense exchange with the officer, they learn that Zhenya has been summoned because the missing money has been found.

Relieved, Nikolai and Zhenya part ways, agreeing to meet again in a week at the same spot. However, when the week arrives, Nikolai does not receive shore leave and asks his friend Pyotr to deliver a message to Zhenya on his behalf.

== Cast ==
- Ariadna Shengelaya as Zhenya
- Lev Prygunov as Nikolai Valezhnikov
- Vasili Makarov as Vasily Kuzmich
- Svetlana Konovalova as Zinaida Prokofievna
- Vladimir Vysotsky as Pyotr
- Natalya Kustinskaya as Katya
- Gennadi Yukhtin as Vasily Ivanovich, former sailor
- Valentina Ananina as Nyura
- Viktor Sergachyov as student Vitya
