= Arthur Omar =

Brazilian artist

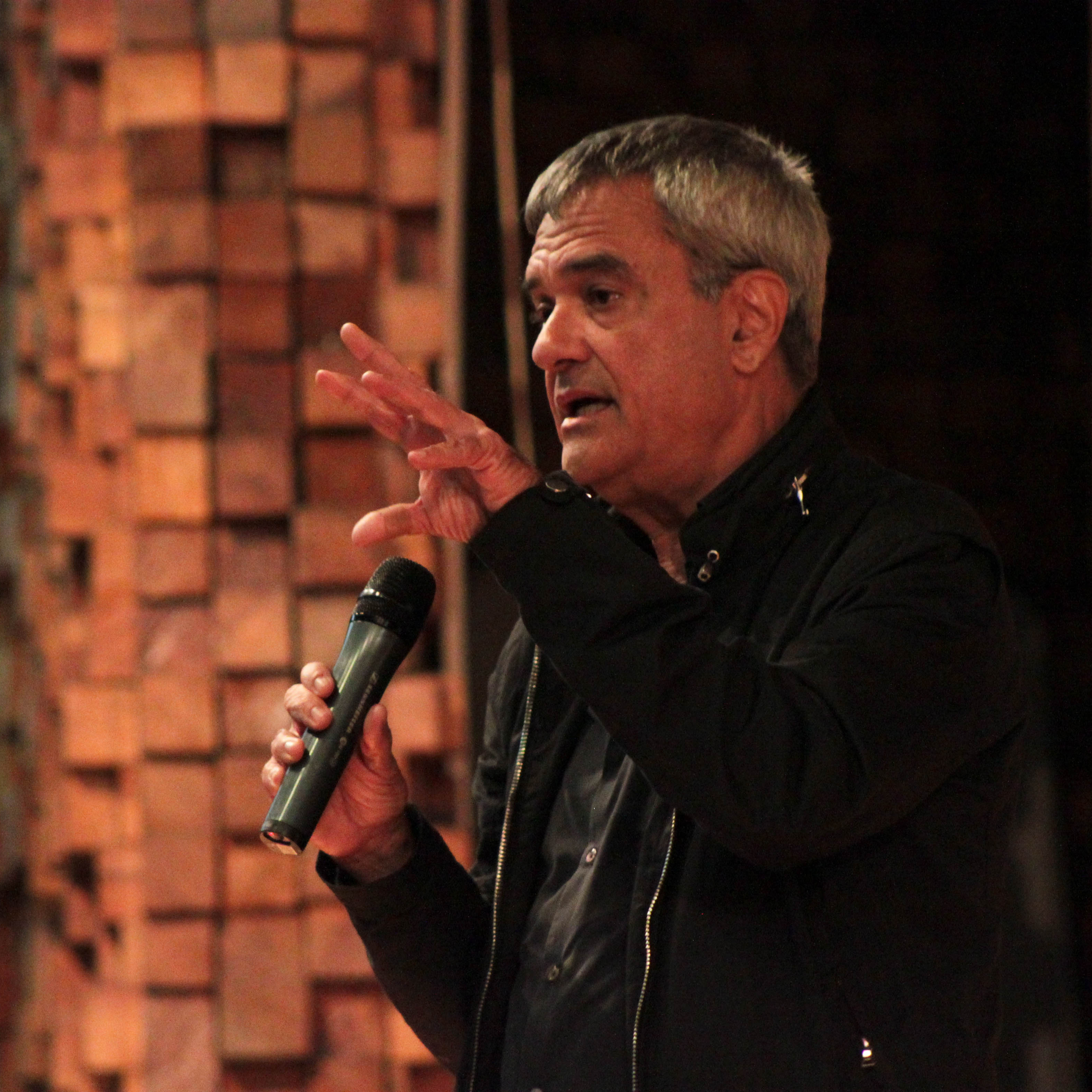
- Arthur Omar in 2012.
- Born: 1948 (age 76–77); Poços de Caldas, Brazil
- Known for: Video art, photography, films, installations
- Style: Contemporary
- Website: Official website

Arthur Omar (born 1948, Poços de Caldas) is a Brazilian contemporary artist. Omar is a video artist, photographer, filmmaker, and installation artist.

== Career ==
Omar works with cinema, video, photographic installations, music, poetry, and drawing. He also writes essays and theoretical reflections on the process of creation and the nature of images. Themes such as aesthetic ecstasy, sensory and social violence, and the creation of visual metaphors characterize his work.

In 1999, Omar was the subject of a complete retrospective of films and videos at the Museum of Modern Art in New York City. In 2001, additional retrospectives took place in Rio de Janeiro and São Paulo at the Centro Cultural Banco do Brasil.

In the 1997 edition of the São Paulo Bienal, Omar presented Anthropology of the Glorious Face, a panel consisting of 99 large-format black-and-white photographs. Some of these images are the origin of the current color series The Mechanical Skin.

== Awards ==
In 2001, Omar received awards given by the Associação Paulista de Críticos de Arte for two exhibitions: The Splendor of Opposites, a series of landscape photographs of the Amazon.

== Exhibitions ==
He published the photo albums Antropologia da face gloriosa (Anthropology of the glorious face), Zen and the Glorious Art of Photography, and The Splendor of Opposites.

In 2005, he exhibited at the Rencontres d'Arles festival, France.
