= I Am Twenty =

- Directed by: Marlen Khutsiev
- Written by: Marlen Khutsiev; Gennady Shpalikov
- Produced by: Victor Freilich
- Starring: Valentin Popov; Nikolai Gubenko; Stanislav Lyubshin; Marianna Vertinskaya
- Cinematography: Margarita Pilikhina
- Release dates: 1965 (censored version); 1989 (original version)
- Running time: 189 minutes
- Country: Soviet Union
- Language: Russian

I Am Twenty (Russian: Мне двадцать лет, translit. Mne dvadtsat let) is a 1965 Soviet drama film directed by Marlen Khutsiev. It is Khutsiev's most famous film and considered a landmark of 1960s Soviet cinema.

The film was originally entitled Zastava Iliycha (known in English alternately as Ilyich's Gate or Lenin's Guard), but it was heavily censored upon completion, trimmed to half its original length, retitled and withheld from release until 1965. A restored 3-hour version was released in 1989, and is sometimes referred to by the original title.

The film follows the recently demobilized Sergei, a young man who returns to his Moscow neighborhood after two years of military service.

== Plot ==
The film opens with a symbolic scene of three Red Guards from the time of the October Revolution walking down the street. Gradually, the timeline shifts, and the Red Guards are replaced by contemporary figures—a group of young people, and later, a recently discharged soldier. This soldier, Sergey Zhuravlev, is the protagonist. Sergey’s father died on the front during the Great Patriotic War, and he now lives with his mother and sister in a communal apartment near Zastava Ilyicha Square. The story follows Sergey and his friends, Nikolai Fokin and Slava Kostikov, as they navigate life.

Slava, now married with a child, still spends most of his free time with his friends, often neglecting his family responsibilities. Nikolai, a cheerful optimist and ladies' man, finds himself in a moral dilemma when his boss at work tries to recruit him as an informant. He firmly refuses and later laments to his friends, saying, "A young man—and already a scoundrel."

Sergey, meanwhile, searches for a purpose in life and a woman who meets his high ideals. During a May Day parade, he meets Anya, the daughter of wealthy parents. Together, they attend a poetry evening at the Polytechnic Museum, where prominent poets of the era—Yevgeny Yevtushenko, Andrei Voznesensky, Rimma Kazakova, Robert Rozhdestvensky, Mikhail Svetlov, Bella Akhmadulina, and Bulat Okudzhava—recite their works. Boris Slutsky also reads poems by his late friends Mikhail Kulchitsky and Pavel Kogan, who died in the war.

Sergey later attends Anya’s birthday party but feels out of place among the "golden youth." Afterward, he experiences a surreal encounter with his late father. Sergey seeks his father’s advice, but the father, who died at 21, admits he cannot guide his 23-year-old son. Sergey then notices the room filled with his father’s wartime comrades, asleep.

The film concludes with a ceremonial scene of the changing of the guards at Lenin’s Mausoleum.

== Cast ==
- Valentin Popov as Sergey Zhuravlyov
- Nikolay Gubenko as Nikolay 'Kolya' Fokin
- Stanislav Lyubshin as Slava Kostikov
- Marianna Vertinskaya as Anya
- Zinaida Zinoveva as Olga Mikhaylovna Zhuravlyova
- Svetlana Starikova as Vera Zhuravlyova
- Lev Prygunov as Aleksandr Zhuravlyov
- Tatiana Bogdanova as Lyusya Kostikova
- Lyudmila Selyanskaya as Katya Yermakova, conductress
- Aleksandr Blinov as Kuzmich (as Sasha Blinov)
- Svetlana Svetlichnaya as Svetlana
- Pyotr Shcherbakov as Chernousov
- Andrei Konchalovsky as Yura
- Gennady Shpalikov as cameo

== Style ==
I Am Twenty is notable for its often dramatic camera movements, handheld camerawork and heavy use of location shooting, often incorporating non-actors (including a group of foreign exchange students from Ghana and famous poets, among them Yevgeny Yevtushenko) and centering scenes around non-staged events (a May Day parade, a building demolition, a poetry reading). Filmmakers Andrei Tarkovsky and Andrei Konchalovsky both play small roles in the film, as do Rodion Nakhapetov and Lev Prygunov. The dialogue often overlaps and there are stylized flourishes that echo the early French New Wave, especially François Truffaut's black and white films. The screenplay, co-written by Gennady Shpalikov, originally called for a film running only 90 minutes, but the full version of the film runs for three hours.

== Production and censorship ==
I Am Twenty began production in 1959, during the de-Stalinization period of the Khrushchev thaw, when Soviet society experienced several years of unprecedented freedom of speech.

By the time the film was finished, the thaw was waning and the film's openly critical view of Stalinism was deemed unacceptable, as was its portrayal of the lives of everyday Soviet youth worrying about money and jobs and listening to Western music. At a speech in March 1963, Khrushchev personally attacked the film and denounced Khutsiev and his collaborators for "[thinking] that young people ought to decide for themselves how to live, without asking their elders for counsel and help."
