= Nikolai Gubenko =

Soviet actor (1941–2020)

- Николай Губенко
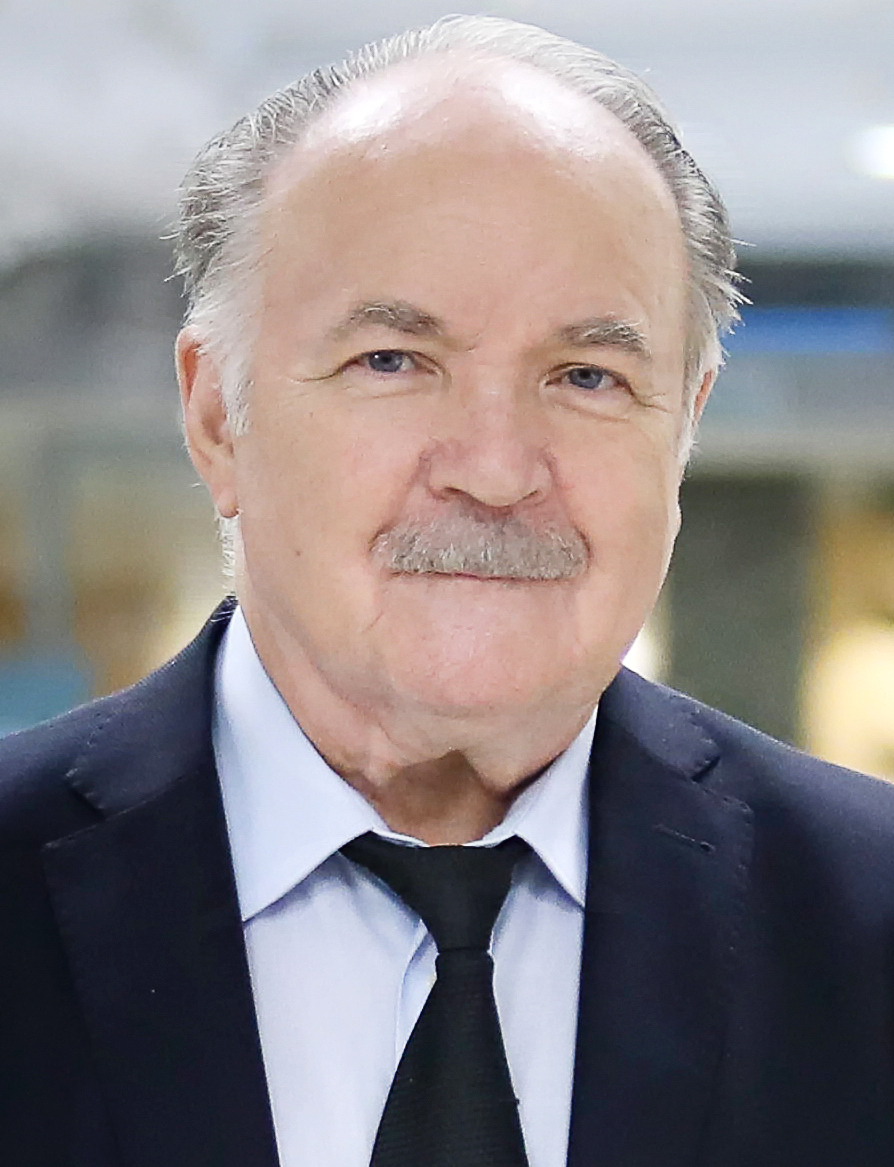
- Gubenko in 2018

Minister of Culture
- In office 21 November 1989 – 27 November 1991
- Premier: Nikolai Ryzhkov; Valentin Pavlov; Ivan Silayev
- Preceded by: Vasily Zakharov
- Succeeded by: Office abolished

Personal details
- Born: 17 August 1941 Odesa, Ukrainian SSR, Soviet Union
- Died: 16 August 2020 (aged 78) Moscow, Russia
- Party: Communist Party of the Russian Federation
- Spouse: Zhanna Bolotova
- Profession: Actor, film and theatre director, screenwriter, politician

Nikolai Nikolaevich Gubenko (Russian: Николай Николаевич Губенко, Ukrainian: Микола Миколайович Губенко; 17 August 1941 – 16 August 2020) was a Soviet and Russian actor, film and theatre director, screenwriter, founder of the Community of Taganka Actors theatre. His movie Wounded Game was entered into the 1977 Cannes Film Festival. He was named People's Artist of the RSFSR in 1985.

Gubenko was also active in politics. He served as the last Minister of Culture of the USSR (1989–1991) and as the Russian State Duma deputy between 1995 and 2003. From 2005, he acted as the Moscow City Duma deputy.

== Early life ==
Nikolai Gubenko was born in the Odessa Catacombs during the Defence of Odessa, the youngest of five children. His mother was Russian and his father – a native Ukrainian; both of them died in 1942 during the Great Patriotic War. His father joined the Soviet Air Forces before Nikolai was born and was killed in action near Voroshilovgrad. His mother, a chief designer at one of the local plants, was interrogated during the Nazi-Romanian occupation of Odessa and killed after she refused to collaborate; her body was returned to Nikolai's grandfather "with traces of hanging".

All of Gubenko's siblings were adopted, while he was left with his grandparents who sent him to the Odessa orphanage after the war. Then he joined a special boarding school with a focus on the English language. Upon graduation he was supposed to enter the Military Institute of Foreign Languages, but it was closed in 1955 following Nikita Khrushchev's war reform. After that, in 1958 he joined the Odessa Young Spectator's Theatre to work as a stagehand and an extra.

== Career ==
Around 1960 Gubenko arrived in Moscow and passed the entrance exams for the acting department of VGIK, the course led by Sergei Gerasimov and Tamara Makarova which he finished in 1964. During the studies, he met his future wife, actress Zhanna Bolotova. As a student he performed in one of the leading roles in the cult Soviet movie I Am Twenty (originally titled Ilyich's Gate) directed by Marlen Khutsiev. It had a long, troubled production history. Finished in 1962, it was screened at the Moscow Kremlin and greatly angered Nikita Khrushchev who compared it to an ideological diversion and criticized it for "ideas and norms of public and private life that are entirely unacceptable and alien to Soviet people".

The final cut was released only in 1965, when Gubenko had already graduated. He played Adolf Hitler in his diploma play based on Bertolt Brecht's The Resistible Rise of Arturo Ui. As Gubenko later recalled, he invested all his hate towards the man responsible for the deaths of his parents into the role. His performance turned so powerful that Yuri Lyubimov who visited the play immediately made him an offer to join the Taganka Theatre, even though Gubenko had studied to be a film actor. He served there from 1964 until the end of the 1960s when he decided to dedicate himself to cinema and entered director's courses at VGIK, also led by Gerasimov and Makarova, which he finished in 1970.

Between 1971 and 1988, Gubenko directed six movies. The first, A Soldier Returns from the Front, was awarded the Vasilyev Brothers State Prize of the RSFSR. His 1976 Wounded Game (or Podranki) was based on his own original screenplay. The story covered the lives of orphans in the post-war Odesa. According to Gubenko, it was 50/50 autobiographical and included many personal details. Fifteen leading roles were performed by real orphans – he had watched thousands of children from orphanages and boarding schools all over the country. The film was seen by 20.3 million people and was entered into the 1977 Cannes Film Festival. It was also awarded the bronze Hugo prize at the 1977 Chicago International Film Festival.

In 1987, Gubenko returned to the Taganka Theatre following the death of Anatoly Efros. He headed it, started resurrecting old plays and at the same time used all his influence to help Yuri Lyubimov return to the USSR. As soon as Lyubimov's citizenship was restored, he left the director's chair, but remained in the theatre as an actor. He was also offered the seat of the Minister of Culture of the USSR, becoming the first Soviet arts professional to hold a similar post since Anatoly Lunacharsky in 1917. He served from 1989 to 1991 when the dissolution of the Soviet Union occurred, and so he was the last Soviet Minister of Culture.

In 1992, a split happened at Taganka following Lyubimov's contract being sent to the Moscow mayor Gavrill Popov for signature, where he basically suggested that the theatre should be privatized by attracting "foreign colleagues", and move to the contract system. This would have allowed him to hire or fire actors at any time, while all the inner conflicts would be resolved at the International Court.

Lyubimov himself spent most of his time abroad and refused to talk with the actors. At one point he attended a meeting and got into an argument with Gubenko who took the side of the protesters and was fired. Yet he continued acting in the play Vladimir Vysotsky based around Vladimir Vysotsky's songs. Lyubimov then sought the help of OMON to ban him from entering and canceled the play. After that Gubenko left along with 35 other actors and founded his own non-state theatre – the Community of Taganka Actors which he managed until his death, taking part as an actor, stage director, and playwright. In 2008 it received state status.

== Selected filmography ==
Year	Title	Original title			
Year	Title	Original title	Director	Screenwriter	Actor
1965	I Am Twenty	Мне двадцать лет			Nikolai Fokin
1966	The Last Conman	Последний жулик			Petya Dachnikov/vocals
1967	No Password Necessary	Пароль не нужен			Vasily Blyukher
1969	Director	Директор			Aleksey Zvorykin
1969	Home of the Gentry	Дворянское гнездо			Sitnikov
1971	A Soldier Came Back from the Front	Пришёл солдат с фронта	✓		Nikolai Yegorov
1974	If You Want to Be Happy	Если хочешь быть счастливым	✓		Andrei Rodionov
1975	They Fought for Their Country	Они сражались за Родину			lieutenant Goloshyokov
1975	I Want the Floor	Прошу слова			Sergei Uvarov
1976	Wounded Game	Подранки	✓	✓	Grigoriy Albertovich/Aleksey Bartenev (voice)
1977	In the Zone of Special Attention	В зоне особого внимания			Aleksandr Volentir (voice)
1980	Life on Holidays	Из жизни отдыхающих	✓	✓	Aleksey Pavlishchev (voice)
1980	A Few Days from the Life of I. I. Oblomov	Несколько дней из жизни И. И. Обломова			Stoltz's father (voice)
1983	And Life, and Tears, and Love	И жизнь, и слёзы, и любовь	✓	✓	
1988	Forbidden Zone	Запретная зона	✓	✓	episode (uncredited)
2001	Isaуev	Исаев			narrator (voice)
2013	Ku! Kin-dza-dza	Ку! Кин-дза-дза			Vladimir Chizhov (voice)

== Literature ==
- Nikolai Gubenko (2014). Theatre of the Absurd. Plays on the Political Scene. — Moscow: Algorythm, 256 pages ISBN 978-5-4438-0696-9
- Evgeny Gromov (2012). Nikolai Gubenko. Director and Actor. — Moscow: Algorythm, 288 pages ISBN 5-9265-0067-2
