= The Story of Asya Klyachina =

- Directed by: Andrei Konchalovsky
- Starring: Iya Savvina
- Cinematography: Georgy Rerberg
- Release date: 1966
- Running time: 99 minutes
- Country: Soviet Union
- Language: Russian

The Story of Asya Klyachina (Russian: История Аси Клячиной, которая любила, да не вышла замуж, Istoriya Asi Klyachinoy, kotoraya lyubila, da ne vyshla zamuzh, also known as Asya's Happiness and Asya Klyachina's Story) is a 1966 Soviet movie. The artistic director was Mikhail Romadin. Shown briefly in 1967 under the title Asya's Happiness (Russian: Асино счастье), it was not released widely until 1987.

Director Andrei Konchalovsky won the Nika Award for best director for this black-and-white movie.

== Synopsis ==
Set in a postwar Soviet village during the grain harvest, the film follows Asya Klyachina, a young collective farmer with a limp, who is deeply in love with Stepan, a careless and irresponsible driver. Asya is expecting Stepan’s child, but he does not reciprocate her feelings or show any intention of marrying her. Despite this, Asya remains devoted to him, refusing to abandon her love.

Meanwhile, Alexander Chirkunov, a man from the village who has returned from the city, proposes marriage to Asya. He is deeply in love with her and offers the promise of a stable and secure life. However, Asya cannot bring herself to accept his advances, as her heart remains tied to Stepan. Ultimately, Asya makes the courageous decision to raise her child alone, choosing independence and fidelity to her emotions over societal expectations or material security.

== Cast ==
- Iya Savvina as Asya Klyachina
- Gennady Egorychev as Chirkunov
- Alexander Surin as Stepan
- Mikhail Kislov
- Ivan Petrov
- Lyubov Sokolova as Maria, mother of Mishanka
- Boris Parfyonov
- Sergey Parfyonov
- Nikolay Pogodin
