= Lev Prygunov =

Soviet-Russian actor, painter, & poet (born 1939)

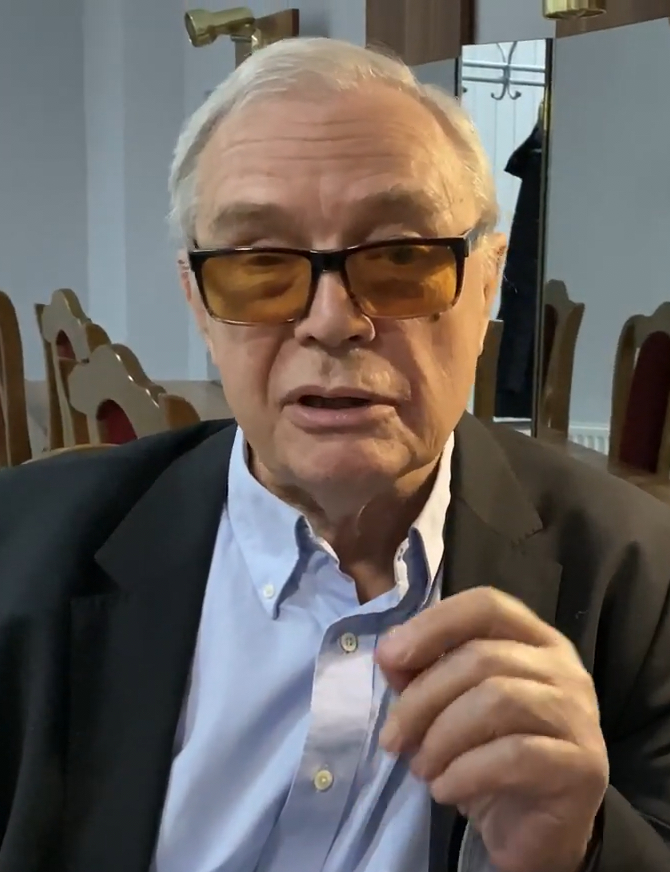
- Lev Prygunov in 2019
- Born: Lev Georgievich Prygunov; 23 April 1939 (age 87); Alma-Ata, Kazakh SSR, USSR
- Occupations: actor painter
- Years active: 1962–present

Lev Georgievich Prygunov (Russian: Лев Гео́ргиевич Прыгуно́в; born 23 April 1939, Alma-Ata, Kazakh SSR) is a Russian actor, painter, People's Artist of Russia (2013). His son is a Russian film director Roman Prygunov.

After graduation, he studied for two years at the biological faculty of the Alma-Ata Pedagogical Institute. In 1962 he graduated from the Leningrad Institute of Theater, Music and Cinematography (Tatyana Georgievna Soinikova's course).

== Filmography ==
- 1962 – Shore Leave
- 1964 – Attack and Retreat
- 1965 – I Am Twenty
- 1965 – Children of Don Quixote
- 1965 – Going Inside a Storm
- 1969 – Bonivur's Heart
- 1970 – Between the High Bread
- 1970 – Chetirimata ot Vagona
- 1970 – Liberation
- 1975 – How the Steel Was Tempered
- 1976 – Fatherless
- 1977 – Born to Revolution
- 1978 – The Tavern on Pyatnitskaya
- 1979 – Search Wind
- 1979 – Shot in the Back
- 1980 – Dangerous Friends
- 1983 – Love. Waiting. Lena
- 1983 – Anxious Sunday
- 1984 – Charlotte Necklace
- 1984 – Shining World
- 1984 – Fire Road
- 1985 – Battle of Moscow
- 1987 – The Garden of Desires
- 1989 – The Criminal Quartet
- 1990 – Nicknamed The Beast
- 1992 – Stalin
- 1995 – Bullet to Beijing
- 1995 – Midnight in Saint Petersburg
- 1997 – The Saint
- 2001 – Again We Must Live
- 2002 – The Sum of All Fears
- 2002 – K-19: The Widowmaker
- 2002 – Master Spy: The Robert Hanssen Story
- 2002 – Drongo
- 2002 – Stereoblood
- 2003 – Operational Alias
- 2003 – The Burning Land
- 2005 – Brezhnev
- 2005 – Archangel
- 2005 – KGB in a Tuxedo
- 2008 – And Yet I Love...
- 2008 – Streetracers
- 2008 – Indigo
- 2009 – Forbidden Reality
- 2013 – World War III
- 2015 – Londongrad
- 2015 – Dukhless 2
- 2019 – Dead Lake
