= The Glass Harmonica (film) =

Banned 1968 Soviet animated short film

- Directed by: Andrei Khrzhanovsky
- Written by: Gennady Shpalikov
- Story by: Lazar Lagin
- Produced by: Yuriy Nolev-Sobolev and Ülo Sooster
- Edited by: Arkady Snesarev and M. Trusova
- Music by: Alfred Schnittke
- Production company: Soyuzmultfilm
- Release date: 1968
- Running time: 20 minutes
- Country: Soviet Union / Russia
- Language: Russian

The Glass Harmonica (Russian: Стеклянная гармоника, romanized: Steklyannaya Garmonika) is a 1968 Soviet animated short film directed by Andrei Khrzhanovsky. It gained notoriety for being banned in the USSR until the perestroika. It is also notable for its unique and surreal animation, which includes references to many artworks by Renaissance and other artists including René Magritte, Hieronymus Bosch, Giuseppe Arcimboldo, Francisco Goya, Albrecht Dürer, El Greco, John Heartfield, and Pinturicchio. The film also contains no spoken dialogue and relies on visual storytelling.

== Plot ==
The story begins with text stating: "Long ago a craftsman created a magical musical instrument, and called it: The Glass Harmonica. The sound of this instrument inspired high thoughts and fine actions. Once the craftsman came to a town whose citizens were in thrall ... to a yellow devil". The craftsman plays the instrument for the citizens in the town square, and magical colorful balls disperse from it. A man touches one, and it turns into a red rose in his hand. Suddenly, the "yellow devil" (the bowler-hatted ruler of the town in black) appears next to the craftsman and leads him away. The yellow devil smashes the glass harmonica into pieces, and the craftsman is never seen again. The man with the rose hides it in his hands, until a snitch pulls his hand away and points it out to the yellow devil. The yellow devil barks an order, and suddenly a pair of guards appears and grabs him. He drops the rose, which withers and dies. The man is not seen again, and the yellow devil rewards the snitch with a gold coin bearing his face. The yellow devil barks another order, and the townspeople rush to a clock tower and tear it apart. The only one who doesn't follow the order is a young boy who picks up the dead rose, upon which it regains life and blooms.

The film then follows a man and woman who stole the hour hand from the clock tower back to their house, which is full of other random objects. The man watches the other side of a wall through a large keyhole, where he sees the snitch in a room full of large chests. The snitch opens one to reveal they are full of gold coins, and he places the one the yellow devil gave him in it. He then showers himself in his coins, until he chokes on one. He spits it out and it goes through the keyhole into the man's home. The coin rolls to the woman, and she hides it under her foot. The man tries to get it for himself, but the woman transforms into a hippopotamus and pushes him back. The man transforms into a rhinoceros and begins to charge at her when suddenly, a drum sounds from the town square and they rush towards it along with the rest of the townspeople.

All the citizens have been transformed into various monsters. Giant statues of the yellow devil's hand holding one of his coins are now in the town square. The monstrous townspeople flock to the statues, where they fight each other until they collapse. They start to rise when the boy who picked up the fallen rose earlier returns as a grown man, playing the glass harmonica. Those who hear its music are transformed from monsters to various renowned figures from throughout history. Soon, there is a large crowd of enlightened people following the glass harmonica. They begin to fly through the air, until they are about to reach the heavens, when suddenly the yellow devil appears and they fall back to the ground. He once again smashes the glass harmonica to pieces, and the man who was playing it disappears. The yellow devil shows one of his coins to the townspeople like before, but this time the enlightened townspeople do not react to it. Instead, someone picks a rose off the ground, which multiplies and are passed around the group. After this, the yellow devil fades away and disappears in a flash of light. The townspeople then return the parts of the clock tower they took and rebuild it.

== Censorship ==
The Glass Harmonica, like all Soviet media, had to be reviewed by the government before it could be released. Various features of the film were deemed unfit for release by the censors. The surreal hand-drawn animation style and unorthodox score composed by Alfred Schnittke contradicted the artistic style of socialist realism that had been mandated by the Soviet government. The ambiguous nature and message of the film could be interpreted in ways that might be anti-government. One can easily draw parallels between the yellow devil, an indifferent and powerful ruler who prevents his citizens from reaching their full potential by suppressing art and creativity while also causing those who oppose him to disappear, and the various regimes of the Soviet Union. The Glass Harmonica, at least on the surface, is an anti-Western and anti-capitalist propaganda film, like many other Soviet films. It opens by stating: "Although the events of this film are of a fantastic character ... its authors would like to remind you of boundless greed, police terror ... the isolation and brutalization of humans in modern bourgeois society". Despite this statement, censors ruled The Glass Harmonica unsuitable for audiences, and it was banned. It remained this way until the perestroika.
