= The Flight of Mr. McKinley =

- Directed by: Mikhail Schweitzer
- Written by: Leonid Leonov
- Starring: Donatas Banionis; Zhanna Bolotova
- Cinematography: Dilshat Fatkhulin
- Music by: Isaac Schwartz
- Production company: Mosfilm
- Release date: 8 December 1975 (Soviet Union)
- Running time: 161 minutes
- Country: Soviet Union
- Language: Russian

The Flight of Mr. McKinley (Russian: Бегство мистера Мак-Кинли, romanized: Begstvo mistera Mak-Kinli) is a 1975 Soviet two-part science fiction film directed by Mikhail Schweitzer.

== Plot ==
A scientist invents the colloid gas — a creation that allows a person to hibernate for a hundred and more years, and wake up in almost the same physical state as when he fell asleep.

The colloid gas is immediately used for commercial purposes by Sam Boulder, who creates a Salvatory system; secret deep underground, well-equipped storage facilities for those people who want to go to the future - fleeing from an incurable disease, boredom, the threat of nuclear war, or simply because of the desire to "remain an eternal champion".

McKinley is a small man, a clerk in one of the advertising bureaus - he is very fond of children but his dreams of having his own are hampered by an inferiority complex, which manifests itself as a fear of nuclear armageddon and a world catastrophe. McKinley seeks to escape from the outside world and himself.

Once at the press conference of SBS, which creates and maintains a network of salvatories, McKinley draws the attention of one of the top managers of this firm and receives an invitation to visit one of the salvatories to get acquainted with his work. After that, Mr. McKinley, fascinated by the fantastic technology of the salvatories, has only one dream in life - to get into the salvatory and escape to the future. For this, he is even ready to commit the crime.

He attempts several times to get rich to buy a treasured ticket to a salvatory but always ends up failing. At the last moment, McKinley finds a winning lottery ticket, which has the amount required to purchase the ticket.

The fantasy comes faithful - McKinley sleeps for 250 years to wake up later clean, shaved and washed ready to go out into the new world. He does not pay attention to the strange behaviour of the hateful and contempt employees of SBS, who are performing their duties strictly according to the instructions. The elevator takes McKinley to the surface of the Earth but instead of a flowering garden, a world scorched by endless wars waits for him.

But all this turns out to be only a dream. McKinley did not leave his time period, and he acts as he never did before to cure his complexes.

== Cast ==
- Donatas Banionis — Mr. McKinley (voiced by Zinovy Gerdt)
- Zhanna Bolotova — Miss Bettle
- Angelina Stepanova — Mrs. Ann Shamway
- Boris Babochkin — billionaire Sam Boulder
- Alla Demidova — loose woman
- Vladimir Vysotsky — street singer Bill Seeger
- Aleksandr Vokach — Barens
- Sofya Garrel — Mme. Coquillon
- Leonid Kuravlyov — Mr. Droot
- Tatyana Lavrova— Mrs. Perkins
- Victor Sergachev — Jacques-Paul Coquillon
- Vladimir Kenigson — episode
- Olga Barnet — Miss Kathy Benson
- Yuri Volyntsev — McKinley's colleague
- Igor Kvasha — director of SB-Salvatory
- Igor Kashintsev — Parkins

== Production ==
Schweitzer, in the process of reworking Leonov's script so that it would be more suited for the present time, decided to express the author's idea through songs.

Since the film was made in the American style, the idea arose to use the method of end-to-end ballads widely used in American films. The option of inviting Dean Reed was considered, however, Schweitzer's wife came up with the idea of hiring Vladimir Vysotsky.

Vysotsky wrote the ballads, but his music was mostly unsuitable for the picture. Composer of the film's score Schwartz refused to write his own music to tyje ballads which was why some music was written by Anatoly Kalvarsky. Most ballads were truncated to fit the film and some of them were removed when already long film was shortened.

Outdoor scenes of the film were mostly shot in Budapest.

== Reception ==
The film and a number of members of the crew (Леонов, Швейцер, cameraman Дильшат Фатхулин, artist Леван Шенгелия, actors Банионис, Болотова, Бабочкин, Степанова, Демидова) were given the USSR State Prize for year 1977.
