= José Val del Omar =

Spanish film director and inventor (1904–1982)

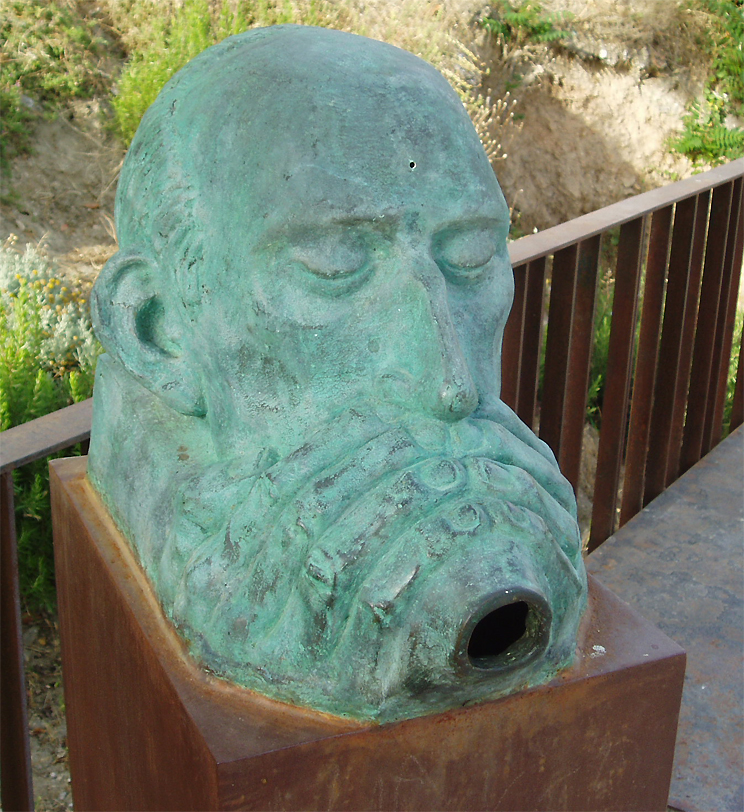
Sculpture dedicated to Val del Omar in Loja, Granada.

José Val del Omar (October 27, 1904 in Granada – August 4, 1982 in Madrid) was a Spanish photographer, film director and inventor.

== Biography ==
Val del Omar enlisted in the pedagogical missions of the Second Spanish Republic, and was a contemporary of celebrated authors such as Federico García Lorca, Luis Cernuda or María Zambrano, whose work is collectively framed within the so-called Silver age of Spanish literature and sciences.

Val del Omar described himself as a "film believer", a discipline which he formulated under the initials "PLAT" (Picto-Luminic-Audio-Tactile), his integrating concept of film. As early as 1928, he tested some of his most characteristic filmmaking techniques, such as the "a-panoramic overflow of the image", where the subject moves beyond the limits of the screen, or his concept of "tactile vision". These techniques were applied, together with sound explorations, to his work "Elementary Triptych of Spain", which comprises Aguaespejo Granadino (1953–1955), Fuego en Castilla (1958–1960) and Acariño Galaico (1961/1981–1982/1995), finished posthumously. His explorations were not particularly valued until after his death.

== Filmography ==
- Estampas (José Val del Omar and other "misionaries", 1932, 13 minutes, B&W, silent, 16 mm).
- Fiestas Cristianas / Fiestas Profanas (1934–1935, 51 minutes, B&W, silent, 16 mm)
- Vibración de Granada (1935, 20 minutes, B&W, silent, 16 mm).
- Película Familiar (1938, 8 minutes, B&W, silent, 16 mm).
- Aguaespejo Granadino (1953–55, 21 minutes, color and B&W, 35 mm).
- Fuego en Castilla (1958–60, 17 minutes, color and B&W, 35 mm).
- Acariño Galaico (1961/1981–82/1995, 23 minutes, B&W, 35 mm).
