= There Lived Kozyavin =

1966 Soviet animated short

- Written by: Gennady Shpalikov; Lazar Lagin
- Story by: Andrei Khrzhanovsky
- Directed by: Andrei Khrzhanovsky
- Country of origin: Soviet Union / Russia
- Original language: Russian

Production
- Executive producer: A. Zorina
- Editor: Raisa Frichinskaya
- Running time: 9:48
- Production company: Soyuzmultfilm

Original release
- Release: 1966

There Lived Kozyavin (Russian: Жил-был Козявин) is a 1966 Soviet animated short directed by Andrei Khrzhanovsky, written by Lazar Lagin and Gennady Shpalikov.

== Background ==
Khrzhanovskij directed this film in a surrealist, constructivist world, which resembles paintings by Giorgio de Chirico.

== Plot ==
Kozyavin works in an office bureaucracy handling paperwork. His superior assigns him to locate another employee Sidorov. After questioning his colleagues, he leaves to search for Sidorov. Determined not to stray off course, he walks in a straight line in and out of a sewer. He arrives at a wall, which is destroyed by a wrecking ball. He enters the construction site and asks the foreman a question, but the din renders his words unintelligible. The foreman signals the entire site to stop work. Kozyavin asks one more time, if he had seen Sidorov. After a haranguing by the foreman, he continues with his search.

Kozyavin walks into a fair and happens upon a pole with acrobats performing, interrupting their regime. They are questioned by Kozyavin to no avail. He next meets a violinist, who plays a composition which gets increasingly erratic with Kozyavin's questioning of the latter if he saw Sidorov. Without any response, Kozyavin nudges him and takes his violin bow. Walking on surrealistic stairs, he enters a commission building.

Kozyavin sparks a light and goes through a darkened gallery of paintings and antiques, finally coming across two people, who looked like thieves. Kozyavin is oblivious to their ongoing burglary and asks if they saw Sidorov. Surprised, they help Kozyavin by giving directions which leads him out of the building. He continues his search, still walking directly straight ahead.

He enters a pipeline on the ground, in which curves becomes unrealistically smoothed by Kozyavin himself. He jumps from the pipeline onto the ground and treds on dry veld. Determined to find Sidorov, Kozyavin walks through the veld, arriving at a mountain and summiting it. He arrives at a desert and stumbles upon a giant skeleton of a prehistoric animal. Walking through its backbone like a stair and destroying it, he meets a paleontologist and asks if he saw Sidorov. With no reply and no regret about the destroyed skeleton, Kozyavin leaves. A body of stagnant water does not stop him from swimming to Antarctica.

Eventually, having circumnavigated the planet in a straight line, Kozyavin arrives at his office having failed to locate Sidorov. Kozyavin reports to his superior with a shrug and returns to his desk to shuffle paperwork.
