= A Long Happy Life =

- Russian: Долгая счастливая жизнь
- Directed by: Gennady Shpalikov
- Written by: Gennady Shpalikov
- Produced by: Vladimir Besprozvanny
- Starring: Inna Gulaya; Kirill Lavrov; Yelizaveta Akulicheva; Pavel Luspekayev; Oleg Belov
- Cinematography: Dmitry Meskhiev
- Edited by: Aleksandra Borovskaya
- Music by: Vyacheslav Ovchinnikov
- Production company: Lenfilm
- Release date: 1966
- Running time: 76 min.
- Country: Soviet Union
- Language: Russian

A Long Happy Life (Russian: Долгая счастливая жизнь, romanized: Dolgaya schastlivaya zhizn) is a 1966 Soviet melodrama film written and directed by Gennady Shpalikov.

According to the Russian Guild of Film Critics, A Long Happy Life is at number 92 in the 100 best Russian films.

The film tells about the geologist Viktor, who on his way home meets a girl named Lena, whom he falls in love with. Viktor promises her a long happy life, but in reality everything does not turn out as he thought. He understands that his feelings are not as strong as at the first meeting, and she, in turn, was ready for this.

== Plot ==
The film, based on a screenplay by Gennady Shpalikov, is set in the town of N., described as resembling the many young towns that emerged in Siberia. After a Saturday work shift, a group of young construction workers head home. Their bus stops abruptly, its headlights illuminating a suitcase and a bag on the road. A new passenger, Viktor (Kirill Lavrov), boards the bus. Seated next to Lena (Inna Gulaya), he introduces himself alternately as a geologist separated from his group and as a foreign spy. As the story unfolds, it becomes clear that Viktor is an engineer returning to his hometown of Kuibyshev after a three-month expedition. The two develop a growing connection, sharing memories of significant moments: Lena recalls learning to swim, while Viktor reminisces about living on a high-altitude station as a child.

The bus arrives in N. and stops near the local cultural club. A Moscow Art Theatre troupe is in town, performing The Cherry Orchard. Lena, organizing the event, invites Viktor to attend the play. Although initially unable to respond due to interruptions from Lena's acquaintances, Viktor joins later, during the second act. In the intermission, the pair reconnect. Their dialogue, reminiscent of Chekhovian characters, touches on deep themes. Lena admits her fear of "living an empty life," while Viktor speaks of the need to find "something bright and true."

As their bond deepens, Viktor, who describes himself as a "free man," expresses a desire to embark on a journey with Lena "in any direction." Lena, in turn, declares she would go "anywhere" with him. However, the next morning, when Lena arrives at Viktor's floating base with her suitcase and three-year-old daughter, the situation becomes uncertain. Viktor, unprepared for such a dramatic shift, hesitates. Their breakfast at an outdoor café is tense, culminating in Viktor leaving under the pretext of making a phone call, only to never return. As Viktor departs the town by bus toward the airport, he gazes out the window at a barge drifting down the river, its slow progress mirroring the unresolved tension of their encounter.

== Cast ==
- Inna Gulaya as Lena
- Kirill Lavrov as Viktor
- Yelizaveta Akulicheva as Barmaid
- Pavel Luspekayev as Pavel
- Oleg Belov as friend of Lena
- Larisa Burkova as Firefighter's Fiancée
- Alexey Gribov as Firs
- Liliya Gurova as Maid in a rest home
- Natalya Zhuravel as bus conductor
- Alla Tarasova as Ranevskaya
- Leonid Gubanov as Trofimov
