= Andrei Khrzhanovsky =

Soviet and Russian director-animator (born 1939)

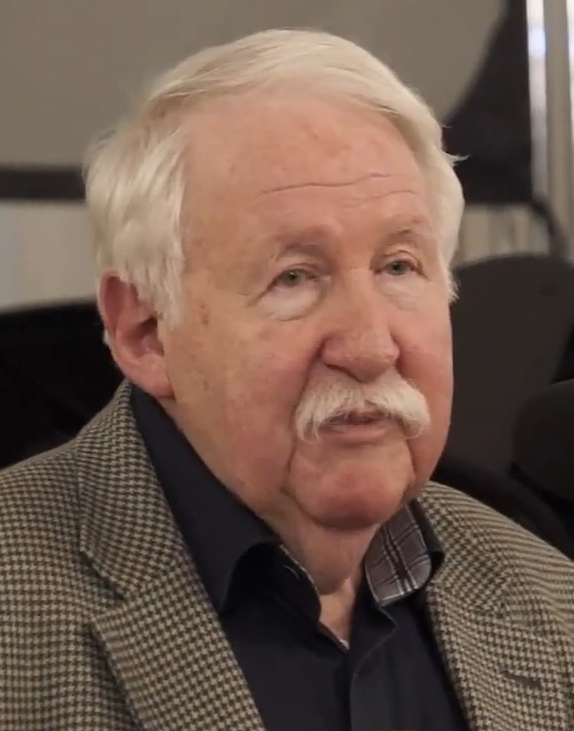
Khrzhanovsky in 2019

Andrei Yurievich Khrzhanovsky (Russian: Андрей Юрьевич Хржановский; born 30 November 1939, Moscow) is a Soviet and Russian animator, documentary filmmaker, writer and producer known for making art films. Married to philologist, editor and script doctor Maria Neyman, he is the father of director Ilya Khrzhanovsky. He was named People's Artist of Russia in 2011.

== Career ==
He rose to prominence in the west with his 2009 picture Room and a Half starring Grigory Dityatkovsky, Sergei Yursky, Alisa Freindlich) about Joseph Brodsky. Although Khrzhanovsky's 1966 dark comedy There Lived Kozyavin was clearly a comment on the dangerous absurdity of a regimented communist bureaucracy, it was approved by the state owned Soyuzmultfilm studio. However, The Glass Harmonica in 1968, continuing a theme of heartless bureaucrats confronted by the liberating power of music and art, was the first animated film to be officially banned in the Soviet Union.

== Selected filmography ==
- There Lived Kozyavin (1966, short film; Russian: Жил-был Козявин)
- The Glass Harmonica (1968, short film; Russian: Стеклянная гармоника)
- Armoire (1970, short film; Russian: Шкаф)
- The Butterfly (1972, short film; Russian: Бабочка)
- A Fantastic Tale (1978; Russian: Чудеса в решете)
- A Pushkin Trilogy (1986; Russian: Любимое моё время)
- The Lion with the White Beard (1995; Russian: Лев с седой бородой)
- A Cat and a Half (2002; Russian: Полтора кота)
- Room and a Half (2009; Russian: Полторы комнаты)
- The Nose or the Conspiracy of Mavericks (2020; Russian: Нос, или Заговор не таких)
