= Zhanna Bolotova =

Soviet and Russian actress

- Born: Zhanna Andreyevna Bolotova; 10 October 1941 (age 84); Novosibirsk Oblast, Russian SFSR, Soviet Union
- Occupation: Actress
- Years active: 1957–2005
- Awards: People's Artist of Russia (1985); USSR State Prize (1977)

Zhanna Andreyevna Bolotova (Russian: Жанна Андреевна Болотова; 10 October 1941, Novosibirsk Oblast, USSR) is a Soviet film actress who was popular in the 1970s and the early 1980s. In 1977 she became a USSR State Prize laureate and was designated as a People's Artist of Russia in 1985. The actor and theatre/film director Nikolai Gubenko was her husband.

== Biography ==
Zhanna Bolotova was born in the Siberian resort Karachi Lake nearby Novosibirsk, on 10 October 1941. She debuted on screen while still at school, in The House That I Live In by Lev Kulidzhanov and Yakov Segel. In 1964 she graduated from the Gerasimov Institute of Cinematography where she studied in the class of Sergei Gerasimov and Tatyana Makarova, to join the Cinema Actor Studio Theatre. As a first year student she married Nikolai Gubenko; the pair soon divorced but re-united several years later.

Among Zhanna Bolotova's best-known films were People and Animals (1962) and To Love Somebody (1972), both by Sergei Gerasimov. In 1969 she received her first international award, for The Best Female Role, at the Varna Red Cross film festival, for 24-24 Does Not Return. The Silence of Dr. Evens (1974) earned her another award in the same category, at the Trieste Film Festival. She also starred in several films by Nikolai Gubenko, among them Wounded Game (1977), Scenes from the Life of Resort Visitors (1980), Life, Tears and Love (1984). In 1977 Bolotova received the USSR State Prize for her part in The Flight of Mister McKinley. In 1985 she was designated as a People's Artist of Russia.

Zhanna Bolotova appeared in 28 films. She stopped filming in the 1990s but in 2005, after the 17 years absence, appeared in the small role of a university professor in Zhmurki.

== Selected filmography ==
- The House I Live In (Dom v kotorom ya zhivu, 1957), the leading role
- People and Animals (Lyudy i zvery, 1962), Tanya Soboleva, the leading role
- If You Are Right (Yesli ty prav, 1963), Galya, the leading role
- Wings (Krylya, 1966), Tanya Petrukhina
- The Journalist (Zhurnalist, 1967), Nina
- The Flight of Mr. McKinley (Begstvo mistera Mak-Kinli, 1975), Miss Bettle
- Wounded Game (Podranki, 1976), Alla Konstantinovna
- Dead Man's Bluff (Zhmurki, 2005), a teacher
