= Inna Gulaya =

Soviet actress

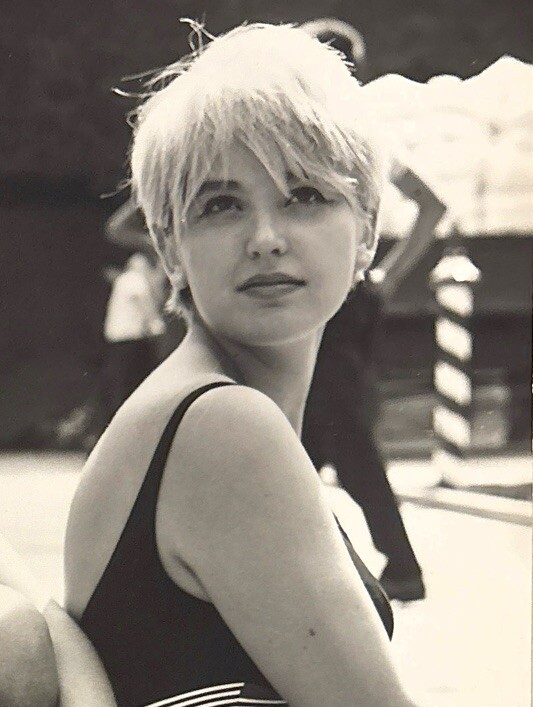
- Gulaya in 1962
- Born: Inna Iosifovna Gulaya; May 9, 1940; Kharkov, Soviet Union
- Died: May 28, 1990 (aged 50); Moscow, Soviet Union
- Occupation: actress
- Years active: 1966–1990
- Spouse: Gennady Shpalikov (m. 1962-1974)

Inna Iosifovna Gulaya (Russian: И́нна Ио́сифовна Гула́я; 9 May 1940, Kharkov – 28 May 1990, Moscow) was a Soviet theatre and cinema actress. She was named a Meritorious Artist of the RSFSR in 1976.

== Early life ==
Gulaya was born in Kharkov, Ukrainian SSR (modern-day Ukraine). Her maternal grandfather Konstantin Makarovich Guliy was a long-time Ukrainian revolutionary, one of the so-called Old Bolsheviks turned a high-ranking official after the October Revolution, serving as the People's Commissar for Labour of the Ukrainian SSR between 1926 and 1932. In 1937 he was arrested and sentenced to death as an enemy of the people.

In 1939 Gulaya's mother Ludmila met Gulaya's future biological father, a native of Kharkov who left her as soon as he learned about her link to Konstantin Guliy. Ludmila started planning an abortion then when she met Joseph Genfer at some party — at the time a graduate of the Moscow State University of Railway Engineering. He proposed to Ludmila immediately after he had learned about her situation, claiming that he fell in love with her at first sight. She agreed to marry Joseph and to keep the child, raising Inna as Joseph's own daughter. Gulaya was made aware of her biological father though and even met him as she grew up, but, according to her mother, she was left indifferent as he felt like a complete stranger to her.

Genfer made a quick career, becoming a chief manager of the Moscow-Ryazan Railway, but this didn't last long as he died soon after. Inna was raised by her mother, who earned money by tailoring. They lived in great poverty in the post-war country, and Ludmila really hoped to give her daughter a proper education, thus she prepared her to enter an institute of foreign languages. But Inna decided otherwise. After the school she tried to enter a theatrical academy, and after a failed attempt she entered a studio at the Moscow Theater for Children.

== Career ==
At the age of twenty Gulaya was chosen for the main role in the Clouds Over Borsk movie directed by Vassili Ordynsky, which also became her first movie role. The picture was part of Nikita Khrushchev's anti-religious campaign that lasted from 1958 to 1964 and, unlike other similar propaganda films, gained a relative success with 22.7 million viewers on the year of release. It also starred a number of other promising young actors in some of their first roles, including Nikita Mikhalkov, Inna Churikova and Vladimir Ivashov.

In a year Gulaya played another leading part in what became her most recognizable movie ever since — When the Trees Were Tall released to big screens in 1962. While the movie also wasn't a box office hit, with only 21 million tickets sold, it quickly grew into a cult classic, being regularly shown on Soviet and Russian TV up till this day. It was also officially selected for the 1962 Cannes Film Festival.

In 1962 Gulaya entered acting courses at the Boris Shchukin Theatre Institute which she finished in 1964. Around the same time she married Gennady Shpalikov, one of the most renowned Russian poets and screenwriters of the Khrushchev Thaw. In 1963 she gave birth to their daughter Daria Shpalikova who also grew to become a theater actress and who performed in several perestroika movies in minor roles before becoming mentally ill.

In addition to her cinema career, Gulaya served at the Moscow Youth Theater and at the National Film Actors' Theatre since 1966.

In 1966 Inna played her last major part in the movie Long Happy Life which was written and directed by Shpalikov specially for her. It went almost unnoticed by the Soviet viewers and press despite winning the Grand Prix at the Bergamo Film Festival. This was also the time when Shpalikov felt out of favour due to his drinking problems and the end of the «thaw». Gulaya was also affected by this; directors stopped offering her roles, and she spent all her free time trying to put her husband into a rehabilitation clinic.

In 1974 Gulaya fled for divorce, as she was getting afraid for her daughter. Same year Gennady Shpalikov committed suicide by hanging in Peredelkino. This became a great shock for everyone. Shpalikov's relatives and friends blamed Inna for what had happened, stating that she pushed him to this. All this resulted in heavy depression, she also got addicted to alcohol, and her career quickly went downhill.

In May 1990 Gulaya was found unconscious at her Moscow apartment by her mother, who called for an ambulance. She was hospitalized and died in two days without regaining consciousness. According to medical experts, the death was caused by the overdose of sleeping pills. While yellow press immediately called it «a suicide», Ludmila Genfer claimed it wasn't the case. As she pointed out, her daughter wasn't suicidal, but rather had sleeping problems and thus took a lot of pills lately. She found her lying at the kitchen before an opened fridge, and everything indicated she was preparing a meal.

Inna Gulaya was buried at the Domodedovo Cemetery near Moscow. In 1993 Leonid Filatov released the first episode of his much-acclaimed documentary TV series To Be Remembered dedicated to Gulaya.

== Filmography ==
Year	Title	Role	Notes
1961	A Noisy Day	Fira	
1961	Clouds Over Borsk	Olya Ryzhova	
1962	When the Trees Were Tall	Natasha	
1963	The Great Road	Shura, Alexandra Grigorievna Lvovova	
1965	Time, Forward!	Shura Soldatova	
1966	Long Happy Life	Lena	
1966	Malchik i devochka	Girl	Voice
1971	If You a Man...		
1971	Quay on That Shore		
1972	Yesli ty muzhchina...	Masha	
1975	The Flight of Mr. McKinley	Sekretar	Uncredited
1977	The Road to Calvary	Marusya	TV Mini-Series
1979	Little Tragedies		TV Mini-Series
1984	Dead Souls		TV Mini-Series
1987	The Kreutzer Sonata		
