= Gennady Shpalikov =

Soviet writer

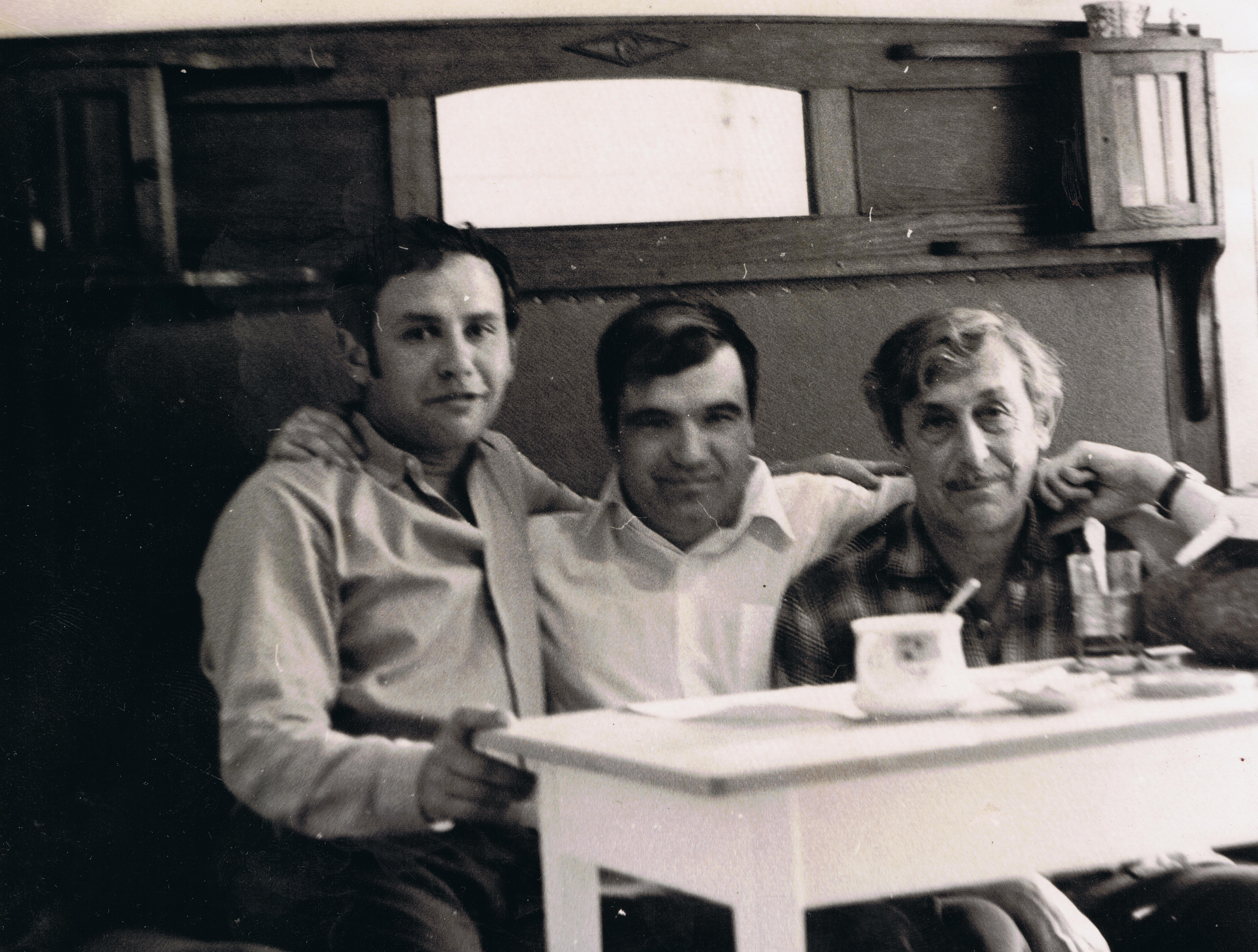
- Gennady Shpalikov (centre)
- Born: Gennady Fyodorovich Shpalikov; 6 September 1937; Segezha, Karelian ASSR, Soviet Union
- Died: 1 November 1974 (aged 37); Peredelkino, RSFSR, Soviet Union
- Education: Gerasimov Institute of Cinematography (1959–1964)
- Occupations: Poet, screenwriter, film director
- Spouse(s): Natalya Ryazantzeva (m. 1959–1962); Inna Gulaya (m. 1962–1974)
- Writing career
- Notable works: I Step Through Moscow; I Am Twenty

Gennady Fyodorovich Shpalikov (Russian: Генна́дий Фёдорович Шпа́ликов; 6 September 1937 – 1 November 1974) was a prominent Soviet Russian poet, screenwriter and film director.

== Early years ==
Gennady was born in the town of Segezha, Karelian ASSR into a Russian family of military background. His father Fyodor Grigorievich Shpalikov came from peasants of the Orenburg Governorate; he finished the Kuibyshev Military Engineering Academy in Moscow and was assigned to build a pulp and paper enterprise in Segezha. In 1939 his family returned to Moscow. With the start of the Great Patriotic War they were evacuated to the Kirghiz SSR along with the Academy and remained there until 1943. Fyodor Shpalikov was sent to the front line; he received an Order of the Red Star in 1944 and was declared missing in action in Western Poland in 1945.

Gennady was raised by his mother Ludmila Nikiforovna Perevertkina, also from peasants of the Voronezh Governorate. Her brother was an acclaimed Soviet colonel general Semyon Perevertkin who led the 79th Rifle Corps of the 3rd Shock Army during the fight for Reichstag and later served as a Deputy Director of the Ministry of Internal Affairs between 1956 and 1960.

In 1947 Shpalikov himself was sent to study in Kiev's military cadet school which he finished in 1955. The same year he published his first poems. He then enrolled at the Moscow Military Commanders Training School, but was discharged after receiving a meniscus injury during the training in 1956. Shpalikov then successfully applied to the screenwriting faculty of VGIK which he finished in 1961. During the studies he met Andrei Tarkovsky and Andrei Konchalovsky who became his close friends. In 1959 he married Natalya Ryazantseva, another aspiring screenwriter (Wings, The Long Farewell, The Voice), but they divorced in just three years.

== Career ==
In 1960 Shpalikov, still a VGIK student, was offered to write a screenplay for the new film by Marlen Khutsiev. Originally titled Ilyich's Gate, the movie was dedicated to the Khrushchev Thaw and the new generation of the Sixtiers, being inspired by the French New Wave. Ryazantzeva, Tarkovsky and Konchalovsky all played small parts in it. A long episode that featured many popular poets of the time was filmed with the support of Yekaterina Furtseva who suggested to make it a two-part feature and raised the film's budget.

Finished by the end of 1962, it was screened in the Moscow Kremlin in March 1963 to a grand scandal. Nikita Khrushchev compared the movie to ideological diversion, criticized it for ideas and norms of public and private life that are entirely unacceptable and alien to Soviet people and for showing young people wandering around the city doing nothing. It was suggested to rewrite the screenplay and cut down the movie, although Shpalikov protested and tried to avoid changing his script at every possibility, so the final reedited version of the film was released only in 1965 under the name of I Am Twenty, also to poor reviews. With 8.8 million viewers it became a commercial failure. Nevertheless, it was awarded a Special Jury Prize at the 1965 Venice Film Festival. Only in 1988 the restored version was released under its original title, called a crucial big screen work of art of the early 1960s by the commission under the Union of Cinematographers of the USSR.

In 1962 Georgiy Daneliya invited Shpalikov for a joint effort, and together they wrote a comedy film Walking the Streets of Moscow. Similar to Ilyich's Gate in tone and message, it seemed suspicious to the Artistic Council at first as they saw it as another movie about young people wandering around the city doing nothing. But after Daneliya assured one of the head officials at the State Committee for Cinematography that they had nothing tricky on their minds, the work became easy, fast and fun. When the film was ready, the Council was still unsure what to make of it. Daneliya and Shaplikov then came up with a meaningful episode (a floor polisher who works at the house of a big writer and criticizes beginning writers on this account). According to Daneliya, the pun was obvious, but the Council was smarter than we thought and pretended they didn't notice anything.

The movie was given a green light and released to a big success, turning into one of the cult films for the Soviet youth, along with the title song composed by Shpalikov as an improvisation during the shooting of the required episode. Walking the Streets of Moscow was officially selected for the 1964 Cannes Film Festival. The term lyrical comedy often used to describe Soviet films was coined by the authors during their fight with the Artistic Council who couldn't understand why the comedy didn't make them laugh.

The end of the Khrushchev Thaw also marked the start of Spalikov's demise. 1966 saw the release of two movies based on his screenplays: I'm from Childhood by Viktor Turov and A Long Happy Life — the only film Shpalikov both wrote and directed. The latter was written with Inna Gulaya in mind, his second wife since 1962 who eventually played the main part. The film went almost unnoticed by the Soviet viewers and press, although it won the first prize at the Bergamo Film Festival. Same happened to the 1971 drama You and Me by Larisa Shepitko: it was well received at the 32nd Venice International Film Festival, but failed miserably at the Soviet box office.

In addition to screenwriting, Shpalikov was also a prominent poet and songwriter. Few of his poems were published during the lifetime, yet many of them found their way through bard songs and evenings of poetry. Sergey Nikitin wrote melodies for many of his poems.

== Death ==
Shpalikov was a heavy drinker according to both of his wives. He had trouble controlling emotions, often disappeared for days and weeks without a trace, even when he was in the middle of an urgent work. Inna Gulaya and her mother tried to put him into a clinic multiple times, but every time he ran away from there. By the start of the 1970s he had almost completely lost hope of finding a job, despite much unpublished material on his hands, including screenplays, poems and a big unfinished novel. Depression could be felt in his letters and diaries of that time. Gulaya, being worried for their daughter Daria Shpalikova (born 1963), decided to divorce him after all.

In 1974 Gennady committed suicide by hanging in Peredelkino. The suicide note said: No, it's not cowardice — I just can't live with you anymore. Do not grieve. I'm tired of you. Remember, Dasha. Shpalikov. He was buried at the Vagankovo Cemetery.

In 2009 a monument was placed at the entrance to the Gerasimov Institute of Cinematography showing Gennady Shpalikov, Andrei Tarkovsky and Vasily Shukshin together. According to Sergei Solovyov, these people defined the face of the national and world cinema during the second half of the 20th century.

== Selected filmography ==
Year	Title	Original title			
Year	Title	Original title	Lyrics	Screenwriter	Other
1962	Colleagues	Коллеги	Deck		
1962	A Tram to Other Cities	Трамвай в другие города		✓	cameo (uncredited)
1963	Walking the Streets of Moscow	Я шагаю по Москве	I'm Walking the Streets of Moscow	✓	
1964	I Am Twenty	Мне двадцать лет		✓	cameo (uncredited)
1966	A Long Happy Life	Долгая счастливая жизнь		✓	director
1966	I'm from Childhood	Я родом из детства		✓	cameo (uncredited)
1966	There Lived Kozyavin	Жил-был Козявин		✓	animation
1966	A Boy and a Girl	Мальчик и девочка	Ice Floating Down the Ladoga; Apple and Cherry Trees Covered in Snow		cameo (uncredited)
1968	The Glass Harmonica	Стеклянная гармоника		✓	animation
1971	You and Me	Ты и я		✓	
1971	Sing a Song, Poet...	Пой песню, поэт…		✓	
1976	Wounded Game	Подранки	By Mischance or by Luck		
1982	Tears Were Falling	Слёзы капали	Losing Friends Only Once		
1983	Wartime Romance	Военно-полевой роман	Rio Rita		
1988	Ilyich's Gate	Застава Ильича		✓	restored version of "I Am Twenty"
1991	Genius	Гений	I Will Drown in the Western Dvina		
1994	Charming Man's Day	День обаятельного человека		✓	
2013	The Thaw	Оттепель	By Mischance or by Luck; Losing People Only Once; So Long, the Garden Ring		promo videos
