= List of Russian films of 1995 =

A list of films produced in Russia in 1995 (see 1995 in film).

== 1995 ==
Title	Russian title	Director	Cast	Genre	Notes
Above the Lake	Надъ озеромъ	Dmitrii Frolov	Peter Kremis	Science fiction	
American Daughter	Американская дочь	Karen Shakhnazarov	Vladimir Mashkov	Drama	
A Moslem	Мусульманин	Vladimir Khotinenko	Yevgeny Mironov	Drama	
A Play for a Passenger	Пьеса для пассажира	Vadim Abdrashitov	Sergey Makovetskiy	Drama	
Everything Will Be Fine!	Всё будет хорошо!	Dmitry Astrakhan	Anatoly Zhuravlyov	Comedy	
Heads and Tails	Орёл и решка	Georgiy Daneliya	Kirill Pirogov	Drama	
I, a Russian soldier	Я — русский солдат	Andrey Malyukov	Aleksey Buldakov	Drama	
Moscow Vacation	Московские каникулы	Alla Surikova	Irina Seleznyova	Comedy	
Music for December	Музыка для декабря	Ivan Dykhovichny	Gregory Hlady	Drama	
Peculiarities of the National Hunt	Особенности национальной охоты	Aleksandr Rogozhkin	Aleksey Buldakov	Comedy	
Shirli-myrli	Ширли-мырли	Vladimir Menshov	Valery Garkalin	Comedy	
Small Demon	Мелкий бес	Nikolay Dostal	Sergey Taramaev	Drama	
The Aristocratic Peasant Girl	Барышня-крестьянка	Aleksey Sakharov	Elena Korikova	Drama	
The Black Veil	Чёрная вуаль	Aleksandr Proshkin	Irina Metlitskaya	Crime	
Time for Sorrow Hasn't Come Yet	Время печали ещё не пришло	Sergey Selyanov	Valeriy Priyomykhov	Drama	
What a Wonderful Game	Какая чудная игра	Pyotr Todorovsky	Andrey Ilin	Drama	
Wolf Blood	Волчья кровь	Nikolai Stambula	Yevgeny Sidikhin	Action	

== See also ==
- 1995 in Russia
