= List of Soviet films of 1974 =

A list of films released in Soviet Union in 1974 (see 1974 in film).

== 1974 ==
Title	Original title	Director	Cast	Genre	Notes
1974
Adventures in a City that does not Exist	Приключения в городе, которого нет	Leonid Nechayev	Evgeny Goryachev, Valentīns Skulme	Children's musical	
Autumn	Осень	Andrei Smirnov	Natalya Rudnaya	Romance	
Birds over the City	Птицы над городом	Sergey Nikonenko	Mikhail Gluzsky	Drama	
Car, Violin and Blot the Dog	Автомобиль, скрипка и собака Клякса	Rolan Bykov	Oleg Anofriev	Family	
Daughters-Mothers	Дочки-матери	Sergei Gerasimov	Innokentiy Smoktunovsky	Drama	
Day of Admittance on Personal Matters	День приёма по личным вопросам	Solomon Shuster	Anatoly Papanov	Drama	
Goaway and Twobriefcases	Кыш и Двапортфеля	Eduard Gavrilov	Andrei Kondratyev	Comedy	
A Great Space Voyage	Большое космическое путешествие	Valentin Selivanov	Ludmila Berlinskaya, Sergei Obrazov	Children's science fiction	
At Home Among Strangers	Свой среди чужих, чужой среди своих	Nikita Mikhalkov	Yuri Bogatyryov, Alexander Kaidanovsky, Sergey Shakurov	Ostern	
Earthly Love	Любовь земная	Yevgeny Matveyev	Yevgeny Matveyev, Yury Yakovlev, Irina Skobtseva, Olga Ostroumova	Drama	
The Ferocious One	Лютый	Tolomush Okeyev	Kambar Valiyev, Suimenkul Chokmorov	Drama, action	
It Is Not Evening Yet	Ещё не вечер	Nikolai Rozantsev	Inna Makarova	Drama	
Ivan and Marya	Иван да Марья	Boris Rytsarev	Ivan Bortnik	Comedy	
Ksenia, Fedor's Beloved Wife	Ксения, любимая жена Фёдора	Vitaly Melnikov	Alla Meshcheryakova	Drama	
Long-Haired Wonder	Чудо с косичками	Viktor Titov	Irina Mazurkevich	Drama	
A Lover's Romance	Романс о влюблённых	Andrei Konchalovsky	Yevgeny Kindinov, Iya Savvina, Yelena Koreneva, Irina Kupchenko, Innokenty Smoktunovsky	Romantic drama, musical	
Melodies of Vera Quarter	Мелодии Верийского квартала	Giorgi Shengelaya	Sofiko Chiaureli, Vakhtang Kikabidze, Ia Ninidze, Maia Kankava, Dodo Abashidze	Musical	
Moscow-Cassiopeia	Москва — Кассиопея	Richard Viktorov	Innokenti Smoktunovsky, Vasili Merkuryev, Lev Durov	Science fiction, comedy	
Moscow, My Love	Москва, любовь моя	Alexander Mitta, Kenji Yoshida	Komaki Kurihara	Romantic drama	Soviet-Japanese co-production
One Hundred Days after Childhood	Сто дней после детства	Sergei Solovyov	Boris Tokarev	Romance	Solovyov won the Silver Bear for Best Director at Berlin
The Red Snowball Tree	Калина красная	Vasily Shukshin	Vasily Shukshin, Lidiya Fedoseyeva-Shukshina, Georgi Burkov, Ivan Ryzhov, Maria Skvortsova	Drama	
The Sannikov Land	Земля Санникова	Albert Mkrtchyan and Leonid Popov	Vladislav Dvorzhetsky, Oleg Dal, Yuri Nazarov, Georgi Vitsin, Makhmud Esambayev	Action	
Shapoklyak	Шапокляк	Roman Kachanov	Vasily Livanov, Irina Mazing, Klara Rumyanova, Vladimir Ferapontov	Animation	
The Straw Hat	Соломенная шляпка	Leonid Kvinikhidze	Andrei Mironov, Vladislav Strzhelchik, Zinovi Gerdt, Yefim Kopelyan, Lyudmila Gurchenko	Musical comedy	
Tsarevich Prosha	Царевич Проша	Nadezhda Kosheverova	Sergey Martynov	Family	
Unbelievable Adventures of Italians in Russia	Невероятные приключения итальянцев в России	Eldar Ryazanov, Franco Prosperi	Andrei Mironov, Ninetto Davoli, Antonia Santilli, Alighiero Noschese, Tano Cimarosa	Comedy, adventure	Soviet-Italian co-production
A Very English Murder	Чисто английское убийство	Samson Samsonov	Aleksey Batalov, Leonid Obolensky, Georgi Taratorkin	Crime	
Woodpeckers Don't Get Headaches	Не болит голова у дятла	Dinara Asanova	Sasha Zhezlyaev	Drama	
