= Aleksandr Avdeyev =

Aleksandr Avdeyev may refer to:

- Aleksandr Avdeyev (canoeist) (born 1956), Soviet sprint canoer
- Aleksandr Avdeyev (pilot) (1916–1942), Soviet fighter ace of World War II
- Aleksandr Avdeyev (politician, born 1946), Russian politician and diplomat
- Aleksandr Avdeyev (politician, born 1975), Russian politician, acting governor of Vladimir Oblast

== See also ==
- Avdeyev, a Russian surname
