= Avdeyev =

Avdeyev (Russian: Авдеев) or Avdeyeva (Russian: Авдеева; feminine) is a common Russian last name that is derived from the male given name Avdey and literally means Avdey's.

It may refer to:

== People ==
- Aleksandr Avdeyev (canoeist) (born 1956), Soviet sprint canoer
- Aleksandr Avdeyev (pilot) (1917–1942), Soviet fighter ace of World War II
- Aleksandr Avdeyev (politician, born 1946), Russian politician and diplomat
- Aleksandr Avdeyev (politician, born 1975), Russian politician, acting governor of Vladimir Oblast
- Aleksey Avdeyev (architect) (1819–1885), Russian architect of St. Vladimir's Cathedral, Sevastopol
- Anna Avdeyeva (born 1985), Russian shot putter
- Igor Avdeyev (born 1973), Kazakhstani footballer
- Sergei Avdeyev (born 1956), Russian cosmonaut
- Julia Avdeeva (born 2002), Russian tennis player
- Yulianna Avdeeva (born 1985), Russian classical pianist
- Yuri Avdeyev (born 1952), Russian politician

== Places ==
- Avdeyeva, Kursk Oblast, Russia
