= The Wife Has Left =

1979 film directed by Dinara Asanova

- Russian: Жена ушла
- Directed by: Dinara Asanova
- Written by: Viktor Aristov
- Produced by: Igor Karakoz
- Starring: Valeriy Priyomykhov; Elena Solovey; Mitya Savelyev; Yekaterina Vasilyeva; Aleksandr Demyanenko
- Cinematography: Yuri Vorontsov
- Edited by: Tamara Lipartiya
- Music by: Bulat Okudzhava; Vladimir Vasilkov
- Production company: Lenfilm
- Release date: 1979
- Running time: 89 minutes
- Country: Soviet Union
- Language: Russian

The Wife Has Left (Russian: Жена ушла, romanized: Zhena ushla) is a 1979 Soviet drama film directed by Dinara Asanova.

Initially, it was planned that the roles of husband and wife would be played by Vladimir Vysotsky and Marina Vlady.

== Plot ==
The film tells about the Soviet family. The husband thought their life was perfect. His wife, in turn, was satisfied with his earnings. They had a baby. But the wife was unhappy and decided to leave.

== Cast ==
- Valeriy Priyomykhov as husband
- Elena Solovey as wife
- Mitya Savelyev as son
- Yekaterina Vasilyeva as Sonya
- Aleksandr Demyanenko as Stepan
- Lidiya Fedoseyeva-Shukshina as Tanya
- Zinovy Gerdt as neighbour
- Aleksei Zharkov as Petrenko
- S. Ivanov as Yevgeny Polyakov
- Valeriy Karavayev as Viktor Izotov
- Maria Vinogradova as the conductress
- Dinara Asanova as a visitor to a coastal cafe
