= The Key That Should Not Be Handed On =

- Russian: Ключ без права передачи
- Directed by: Dinara Asanova
- Written by: Georgi Polonsky
- Produced by: Yuri Gubanov
- Starring: Elena Proklova; Aleksey Petrenko; Lidiya Fedoseyeva-Shukshina; Lyubov Malinovskaya; Zinovy Gerdt
- Cinematography: Dmitry Dolinin; Yuri Veksler
- Edited by: Galina Subayeva
- Music by: Yevgeny Krylatov
- Production company: Lenfilm
- Release date: 1976
- Running time: 95 minute
- Country: Soviet Union
- Language: Russian

The Key That Should Not Be Handed On (Russian: Ключ без права передачи, romanized: Klyuch bez prava peredachi) is a 1976 Soviet romantic drama film directed by Dinara Asanova.

The film tells the story of a young, progressive teacher adored by her students who suddenly faces scrutiny when her candid critiques of colleagues and education norms spark a controversy, prompting the principled new school director, a former military officer, to navigate the conflict and uncover deeper truths about authority and idealism.

== Plot ==
In a typical school in Leningrad, a strange situation arises in the 10th "B" class: the students have poor relationships with their parents and teachers, but they are very close to each other and to their young class teacher, Marina Maximovna. They spend their weekends together, discussing contemporary issues and criticizing their teachers for their conservative, outdated views.

Marina Maximovna is praised by her students, who, in a metaphorical expression by one of the teachers, have given her the "key" to their hearts, with no intention of passing it to anyone else. She is aware of her teaching talent and sees a significant intellectual and spiritual gap between herself and her less successful colleagues. This makes her behave with pride and defiance towards them. The students secretly record her bold and frank comments on a portable tape recorder, including her opinions on the teachers. The tape eventually ends up in the hands of the mother of one of the students, Yulia, who brings it to school, demanding an investigation from the school administration.

The new school principal, a former military officer who initially seems like a rigid and conservative figure, tries to find a reasonable solution to the difficult situation. However, the progressive views of the young teacher are revealed to be less admirable than they initially appeared.

== Cast ==
- Elena Proklova as Marina Maksimovna
- Aleksey Petrenko as Kirill Alexeyevich
- Lidiya Fedoseyeva-Shukshina as Emma Pavlovna
- Lyubov Malinovskaya as Olga Denisovna
- Zinovy Gerdt as Oleg Trigorievich
- Yekaterina Vasilyeva as Klavdiya Petrovna Bayushkina
- Oleg Khromenkov as Bayushkin
- Anvar Asanov as Anton
- Marina Levtova as Yulya Bayushkina
- Aleksandr Bogdanov as Sasha Maydanov
