= Boys (1983 film) =

- Directed by: Dinara Asanova
- Written by: Yuri Klepikov
- Starring: Valeriy Priyomykhov; Yevgeny Nikitin; Olga Mashnaya; Alexey Poluyan; Zinovy Gerdt; Yuri Moroz
- Edited by: Tamara Lipartiya
- Music by: Vitali Chernitsky; Viktor Kisin
- Production company: Lenfilm
- Release date: 1983
- Running time: 96 min.
- Country: Soviet Union
- Language: Russian

Boys (Russian: Пацаны, romanized: Patsany) is a 1983 Soviet crime drama made at the film studio Lenfilm, directed by Dinara Asanova and screenplay by Yuri Klepikov. The premiere of the film took place in the Soviet Union in September 1983.

Head of summer sports and labor camp, a graduate of the Institute of Physical Education gathered troubled teens, many of whom were registered by the police, and was able to be their friend and a good mentor.

== Plot ==
The film opens in a documentary style, with teenagers—future protagonists of the story—answering questions like, "Could you ever hit someone?" and "What is kindness?"

The story then shifts to the trial of 15-year-old Vova Kireyev, a petty thief facing the possibility of real jail time. Vova has largely become a victim of his troubled environment. He arrives at court in a police van from a detention center. A man named Pavel Antonov, who serves as a witness in the trial, speaks on his behalf. In his final words, Vova asks the court for leniency, and the record shows he expressed remorse.

Pavel Antonov (played by Valery Priyomykhov), a recent graduate of the Leningrad Institute of Physical Education and head of a summer sports-and-labor camp, has gathered "difficult" teenagers for the program. Many of them are already known to the police, and Pavel takes Vova under his care directly from the courtroom, where Vova is sentenced to two years of imprisonment with a one-year deferral. Together, they travel by train to the summer camp, where the film explores the troubled lives of these boys, their behavior, responses to events, and views on family, women, authority, and their creative and athletic activities.

At the camp, they live in tents and engage in "socially useful work" like weeding fields, among other tasks. The main entertainment is the evening dances, marked each night by the camp director launching a flare. The story takes a dramatic turn when, just before announcing another evening dance, they discover that the flare gun is missing. It turns out that Vova took it to seek revenge on his father, who, to impress his girlfriend, had cruelly shaved Vova's sister's head, driving her to attempt suicide by gas poisoning. The entire camp chases after Vova, heading toward the railway station.

== Cast ==
- Valeriy Priyomykhov as Pavel Vasilyevich Antonov, head of the summer sports and labor camps for troubled teens
- Olga Mashnaya as Margarita Kireyeva
- Alexey Poluyan as Sinitsyn
- Zinovy Gerdt as associated judge
- Yuri Moroz as Kostya
- Yekaterina Vasilyeva as Zaitsev's mom
- Oleg Khorev as Andrei Zaitsev
- Valery Kravchenko as Sinitsyn's father
- Marina Levtova as Kostya's girlfriend

== Awards ==
- XVIII All-Union Film Festival (Kiev) in a program of feature films for children and youth: 1st prize

== Reviews ==
- Miloserdova N. Boys. Feature Film // RusskoeKino. RU. - 01.10.2008.
