= Maria Vinogradova =

Russian actress

- Мария Виноградова
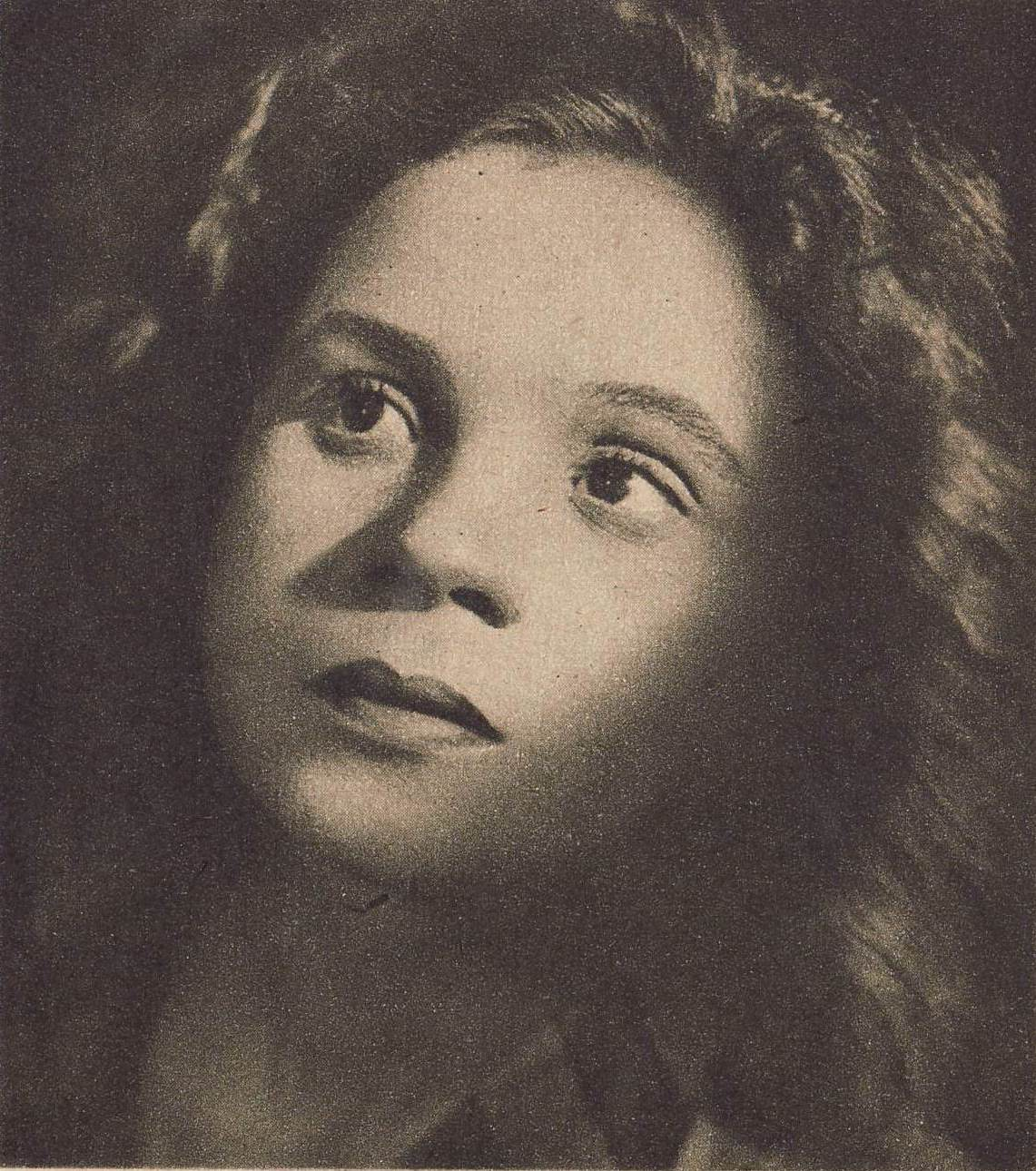
- Vinogradova in 1947
- Born: 13 July 1922; Navoloki, Russian SFSR
- Died: 2 July 1995 (aged 72); Moscow, Russia
- Occupation: Actress
- Years active: 1940–1995

Maria Sergeyevna Vinogradova (Russian: Мари́я Серге́евна Виногра́дова; 13 July 1922 – 2 July 1995) was a Russian actress. She appeared in more than one hundred films from 1940 to 1995.

== Filmography ==
Year	Title	Role	Notes
1940	Siberians	Galka	
1944	Zoya	Vinogradova, Zoya's classmate	uncredited
1944	Once There Was a Girl	episode	uncredited
1944	We from the Urals	Sonya	
1945	Native Fields	Klanka	
1946	Elephant and Rope	neighbor	uncredited
1948	The Last Stage	Nadja, a nursing aide	
1948	The Young Guard	episode	
1953	The Boarder	Vaska	
1956	Volnitsa	Julita	
1958	Star-Child	Star-Child	
1958	Volunteers	Sergeant Valya Kukhnarenko	
1959	Beloved Beauty	Marya	voice
1960	The Adventures of Buratino	The Boy	uncredited
1960	A Simple Story	Saleswoman books	
1960	Resurrection	Khoroshavka	
1964	Walking the Streets of Moscow	mistress of a dog	
1965	Thirty Three	doctor	
1965	From Seven to Twelve	boy	voice
1966	Women	Edik's Companion at the Party	Voice
1966	Damn the Briefcase	Mariya Kolycheva	
1968	Village Detective	mother	
1969	The Coach	teacher	
1970	Way Home	Masha's mother	
1970	The Guardian	late aunt Tebenkova's neighbor	
1970	Tchaikovsky	episode	
1972	Mortal Enemy	refugee	
1973	Adventures of Mowgli	Young Mowgli	Voice
1973	Chipollino	town resident	Voice
1974	Near These Windows...	sailor's mother	
1974	The Red Snowball Tree	Zoya	
1974	Berth	Polina Matveyevna	
1975	Hedgehog in the Fog	Hedgehog	Short, Voice
1975	The Humpbacked Horse	Ivan	Voice
1975	What the Stands Won't Know	Boris' Mother	Uncredited
1975	To the Edge of the World	Marya Vasilyevna	
1975	Concerto for Two Violins	Boy with Milk	Voice, Uncredited
1976	Tryn-trava	Pakonya	
1976	The Last Victim	Mikheyevna	
1977	Practical Joke	Anna Yefremovna	
1977	Poshekhon Antiquity	Annushka	
1977	The Ascent	Village elder's wife	
1977	Office Romance	member of the inventory commission	
1977	Destiny	Cook Glasha	
1977	Sit Next to Me, Mishka!	aunt Nastya	
1977	About the Little Red Riding Hood	third grandmother	TV Movie
1977	Trouble	Klava	
1978	Call Me from Afar	guest in a restaurant	
1978	Newcomer	aunt Sasha	
1978	The Boys	factory worker	
1978	Untypical Story	old woman	
1978	The Magical Voice of Gelsomino	Gelsomino's Neighbour	
1978	Citizen Nikanorova Waits for You	The Neighbour	Voice
1978	Three from Prostokvashino	Fyodor	Short, Voice
1979	Fourth Height	the Korolevs' neighbor	
1979	Undersand Napoleon III	school cleaner	
1979	Fuss of the Fusses	taxi passenger	
1979	Borrow a Telegram	Trader	
1980	The Garage	Employee With a Chicken	
1980	The Wife Has Left	conductress	
1981	Ladies Invite Gentlemen	aunt Klava	
1981	I Want Him to Come	aunt Shura	
1981	Life on Holidays	Margo / Margarita Serafimovna	
1982	From Winter to Winter	aunt Dasha	
1983	Grachi	Yevdokiya Grach	
1983	There Was No Sadness	neighbour	
1983	Find and neutralize	aunt Pasha	
1983	I Promise to Be!	Tamara Timofeevna	
1983	Unexpectedly	notarius	
1983	This is Your Front	Darya	
1983	You are My Delight, My Torment...	episode	
1984	Hurricane Comes Unexpectedly	episode	
1984	Dead Souls	Mavra	TV Mini Series
1984	Third in the Fifth Row	Polina Zakharovna	
1984	The Tale of Tsar Saltan	Povarikha	Voice
1984	Citizens of the Universe	Dasha Gushchina's grandma	
1984	The Invisible Man	lodger in a hood	TV Movie
1985	Rowan Nights	Manya	
1985	Attention! All Posts...	women	Uncredited
1985	Sun in Your Pocket	grandma	
1985	Be Сareful, Vasilyok!	Nadya's grandmother	
1985	Bad Troubles Beginning	Tamara Berezina's mother	
1986	Personal file of Judge Ivanova	Malignant person	Voice, Uncredited
1986	Beauty Saloon	Verochka	
1986	Dating Time	Makaveikha	
1986	An Amazing Find, or The Most Ordinary Miracles	Maxim's grandmother	
1987	Marriage Loan	Varvara Petrovna’s mother	
1987	Summer to Remember	Sanka’s grandmother	
1988	Improvisation on a Biography Theme	class teacher	
1988	It's Not Necessary Once at a Time	old woman at the station	
1988	Night Crew	teacher	
1988	Will of the Universe	granny	
1988	Five Letters of Farewell	episode	
1988	Comment on the Petition for Pardon	Klavdiya Ivanovna, accountant	
1988	Two and One	neighbor	
1988	The Lady with the Parrot	Sergey's mother	
1989	Intergirl	Sergeyevna	
1989	Humble Cemetery	cemetery caretaker	
1989	Prince Udacha Andreyevich	librarian	
1989	Two Arrows. Stone Age Detective	old woman	
1989	Carmen Horrendum	nurse	
1989	Crash – Cop's Daughter	controller	
1990	Jackals	Screen-wiper	
1990	A Cap	Dasha	
1990	Arkady Fomich Committee	Praskovya Ivanovna	
1991	Wolfhound	neighbor	
1991	Anna Karamazoff	black woman, concierge, assistant theater's director	
1994	Life and Extraordinary Adventures of Private Ivan Chonkin	Dunya	
1994	Police Academy: Mission to Moscow	old lady	
1996	Queen Margot	Kabosh's wife	TV Series
