= Woodpeckers Don't Get Headaches =

- Film poster
- Russian: Не болит голова у дятла
- Directed by: Dinara Asanova
- Written by: Yuri Klepikov
- Starring: Sasha Zhezlyaev; Elena Tsyplakova; Yekaterina Vasilyeva; Aleksandr Bogdanov; Ira Obolskaya; Denis Kozlov
- Cinematography: Dmitry Dolinin
- Edited by: Galina Subayeva
- Music by: Yevgeny Krylatov
- Production company: Lenfilm
- Release date: 1974
- Running time: 73 min.
- Country: Soviet Union
- Language: Russian

Woodpeckers Don't Get Headaches (Russian: Не болит голова у дятла, romanized: Ne bolit golova u dyatla) is a 1974 Soviet romantic drama film directed by Dinara Asanova.

The film tells the story of a 14-year-old drum playing schoolboy who can't find his place in life. During his summer vacation, he also experiences first love.

It was the film acting debut of Elena Tsyplakova, who later became a famous actress and film director. The motion picture was also the first in the USSR, during the filming of which the technology flashing was used to control the color of the image.

The film premiered in the USSR on November 5, 1975.

The film's title reflects the well-known fact that woodpeckers don't suffer from headaches, although they chisel a tree at a rate of 12,000 hits a day. For the discovery of the reasons why a woodpecker does not have a headache, American scientists Ivan Schwab and Philip Mayu from the University of California received the Ig Nobel Prize in 2006 - it turned out that this is due to the special structure of the skull in woodpeckers, in which the bones have a spongy structure and protect the brain from concussion during impacts.

== Plot ==
This film is about a young teen drummer nicknamed "The Fly", who constantly lives in the shadow of his brother, a famous basketball player. The Fly's neighbors try to take away his drumkit, but it is saved by his neighbor violinist. Eventually, another neighbor manages to throw his drumkit out the window and break it, but The Fly recovers again and forms his own band. The Fly is also in love with a girl named Ira. They are friends, but get into arguments frequently. Ira lends The Fly a pebble talisman. One day, Ira lets slip that she only became interested in The Fly because of his brother, and they get into a fight. Soon after that, Ira's father gets a new posting, and she has to move with him to another city. However, before she leaves, she has a friend deliver a letter to The Fly apologizing for what said. The Fly rushes to the train station to give Ira back the talisman and say goodbye, but it's too late. The movie ends with The Fly running after the train.

== Cast ==
- Sasha Zhezlyaev as Seva 'Fly' Mukhin
- Elena Tsyplakova as Ira Fedorova (as Lena Tsyplakova)
- Aleksandr Bogdanov as Leva 'Baton' Bulkin (as Sasha Bogdanov)
- Ira Obolskaya as Kapa Tararuhina
- Denis Kozlov as Misha
- Andrey Nikitin as Gavrila
- Yulia Shishkina as Dasha (as Olya Shishkina)
- Yekaterina Vasilyeva as Tatyana Petrovna
- Nikolay Grinko as Mukhin's father
- Tatyana Volkova as Mukhina
- Mikhail Svetin as Stepan Stepanovich
