= Nikolai Vavilov (film) =

- Written by: Yuri Arabov; Aleksandr Proshkin; Sergey Dyachenko
- Directed by: Aleksandr Proshkin
- Starring: Kostas Smoriginas; Andrey Martynov; Irina Kupchenko; Bohdan Stupka; Ingeborga Dapkūnaitė
- Music by: Vladimir Martynov
- Countries of origin: Soviet Union; East Germany
- Original language: Russian

Production
- Cinematography: Boris Brozhovsky
- Running time: 554 minutes
- Production companies: Mosfilm; Jonas Film; Soyuztelefilm

Original release
- Release: 1 February – 1 June 1990

Nikolai Vavilov (Russian: Николай Вавилов) is a 1990 6-part biographical television film. Joint production of the USSR and East Germany. Biopic devoted to the history of the life of Soviet biologist, academician Nikolai Vavilov.

== Plot ==
History of life, contribution to science and social activities of academician Nikolai Ivanovich Vavilov. His scientific and personal confrontation with Trofim Lysenko, the subsequent arrest and death of the scientist in prison.

== Cast ==
- Kostas Smoriginas as Nikolai Vavilov
- Andrey Martynov as Sergey Vavilov
- Irina Kupchenko as Nikolai Vavilov's second wife Yelena
- Bohdan Stupka as Trofim Lysenko
- Sergey Gazarov as Isaak Prezent
- Georgy Kavtaradze as Stalin
- Tamara Degtyaryova as Katya, Nikolai Vavilov's first wife
- Sergey Plotnikov as Ivan Ilyich, father of brothers Vavilovs
- Nikolai Lavrov as Professor Oleg Avdeev
- Ingeborga Dapkūnaitė as Natalia Karlovna Lemke, Nikolai Vavilov's secretary
- Vyacheslav Ezepov as Andrei Zhdanov
- Rim Ayupov as Vyacheslav Abramovich Terentyev
- Nina Usatova as collective farm chairman
- Igor Ivanov as Semyon Petrovich Scheludko
- Elizaveta Nikischihina as Terentyeva
- Georgy Sahakyan as double Stalin

== Film crew ==
- Screenwriters — Sergey Dyachenko, Yuri Arabov, Aleksandr Proshkin
- Director-producer — Aleksandr Proshkin
- Composer — Vladimir Martynov
- Operator — Boris Brozhovsky
- Production designers — Valery Filippov, Ulrich Bergfelder

== Episodes ==
1. Family (Russian: Семья)
2. Secretary (Russian: Секретарша)
3. Bodyguard (Russian: Телохранитель)
4. Wife (Russian: Жена)
5. Eldest Son (Russian: Старший сын)
6. Bonfire (Russian: Костёр)
