= Lost in Siberia =

- Directed by: Alexander Mitta
- Written by: Alexander Mitta; James Brabazon; Valeri Frid; Yuriy Korotkov
- Starring: Anthony Andrews
- Cinematography: Vladimir Shevtsik
- Music by: Leonid Desyatnikov
- Production companies: Mosfilm; Spectrum
- Release dates: April 1991 (Soviet Union); 8 May 1992 (UK)
- Running time: 140 minutes
- Countries: United Kingdom; Soviet Union
- Languages: English; Russian

Lost in Siberia is a 1991 Soviet-British film by Alexander Mitta. It was shot entirely in Russia, either on location or at Mosfilm Studio. The post-production was started at Mosfilm Studio and completed in London. The film was selected as the British entry for the Best Foreign Language Film at the 64th Academy Awards, but was not accepted as a nominee.

== Plot ==
The film follows Andrei Miller, a British archaeologist played by Anthony Andrews, as he gets arrested while doing a special assignment for the Shah of Iran. Mistaken for a spy for British military intelligence with the same name, he gets sent to a labour camp. On the way he meets a Japanese prisoner who speaks some English. He testifies to the military officer that he is totally innocent and asks him to contact the royal family. Most of the movie is a very realistic and ugly picture of the terrible plight of prisoners in Siberia during the Stalin years. Human life has absolutely no value. The only place he finally finds human kindness is when he is dying and is sent to the hospital. A romance develops between him and the camp's doctor, which attracts the anger of the camp's chief who is hoping to marry Anna, the young blond female doctor. Miller gets sent to one of the infamous Kolyma labour camps, and the camp's chief becomes even more evil and hateful towards all the prisoners left in his command. In an ambiguous ending, word comes to the camp that the Shah of Iran and his wife are asking that he be freed. He is released and goes back to his pleasant life, or that is just a delusion that he has while dying of cold and hunger.

== Cast ==
- Anthony Andrews as Andrei Miller
- Vladimir Ilyin as Captain Malakhov
- Elena Mayorova as Anna
- Irina Mikhalyova as Lilka
- Aleksandr Gureyev as Sergeant Konyaev
- Valentin Gaft as Beria
- Aleksei Zharkov as Nikola, robber
- Natalya Gundareva as Faina
- Zinoviy Gerdt as Levenson
- Nikolai Pastukhov as Misha
- Lyubov Sokolova as Klava
- Albert Filozov as Lilka's father

== Awards ==
The film was Britain's entry to the Cannes Festival's competition in 1991 and was nominated as the Best Foreign Language Film at the 49th Golden Globe Awards.

== See also ==
- List of submissions to the 64th Academy Awards for Best Foreign Language Film
- List of British submissions for the Academy Award for Best Foreign Language Film
