= The Miracle (2009 film) =

2009 film directed by Aleksandr Proshkin

- Film poster
- Directed by: Aleksandr Proshkin
- Written by: Yuri Arabov
- Produced by: Ruben Dishdishyan; Sergey Danielyan; Aram Movsesyan
- Starring: Konstantin Khabenskiy
- Cinematography: Gennady Karyuk; Alexander Karyuk; Alexander Sedov
- Distributed by: Amkart
- Release date: 10 October 2009 (Pusan International Film Festival)
- Running time: 110 minutes
- Country: Russia
- Language: Russian

The Miracle (Russian: Чудo, romanized: Chudo) is a 2009 Russian drama film directed by Aleksandr Proshkin. It was entered into the 31st Moscow International Film Festival.

== Cast ==
- Konstantin Khabenskiy as journalist Nikolai Artemyev
- Vitali Kishchenko
- Polina Kutepova
- Sergey Makovetskiy
- Sergei Novikov
- Viktor Shamirov
- Vyacheslav Stepanyan
- Maria Burova as Tatyana
- Kate Tongur as Tatyana's Friend
- Anna Ukolova
