= Zinovy Gerdt =

Soviet and Russian actor

- Зиновий Гердт
- Born: Zalman Afroimovich Khrapinovich; 21 September 1916; Sebezh, Vitebsk Governorate, Russian Empire
- Died: 18 November 1996 (aged 80); Moscow, Russia
- Occupations: Actor; puppeteer; television presenter
- Years active: 1938–1996

Zalman Afroimovich Khrapinovich (Note: Russian: Залман Афроимович Храпинович, romanized: Zalman Afroimovich Khrapinovich) (21 September 1916 – 18 November 1996), known by the pseudonym Zinovy Yefimovich Gerdt, (Note: Russian: Зиновий Ефимович Гердт, romanized: Zinovy Yefimovich Gerdt) was a Soviet and Russian actor. He was awarded the People's Artist of the USSR in 1990.

== Biography ==
=== Early life and education ===
Gerdt was born Zalman Afroimovich Khrapinovich on 21 September 1916 in the city of Sebezh in the Pskov Oblast. His father, Afroim Yakovlevich Khrapinovich, worked for some time in a fabrics shop as a clerk, and later as a salesman. His mother, Rakhil Isaakovna, was a housewife.

His father died quite early, his mother stayed with four children: two boys and two girls, of which Zinovy was the youngest.

In Sebezh he lived up to 11 years, studied at a Jewish school (cheder), and knew Yiddish. After finishing school, Zinovy moved in with his elder brother, who lived in Moscow.

From a young age, Gerdt was fond of reading and writing poetry.

At 15, Gerdt graduated from a vocational school affiliated with the Valerian Kuybyshev Electrical Plant. He started working for Metrostroy as a metalworker-electrician. As a hobby, he was an actor at the factory's Workers' Youth Theatre, also known as TRAM. In 1937, he began acting at the Puppet Theatre of Moscow House of Pioneers.

Subsequently, TRAM was transformed into the theatrical studio of Aleksei Arbuzov and Valentin Pluchek.

From 1937, Gerdt worked in the Puppet Theater at the Moscow House of Pioneers.

Gerdt volunteered to go to the front when World War II began. He was enlisted as a senior lieutenant of a field engineering division and suffered a serious leg wound near Belgorod in February 1943.

=== Career ===
In 1945–1982, Gerdt was in the troupe of the Central Puppet Theater under the leadership of Sergei Obraztsov. He voiced many characters, the most famous one was the entertainer in An Unusual Concert. He performed the role of the entertainer in different countries using the local language and was so convincing that the audiences always believed that the actor knew their language fluently: Gerdt perfectly mastered the art of onomatopoeia.

In the Central Puppet Theater under the leadership of Sergei Obraztsov, Gerdt was also busy in the plays Devil's Mill, Wish Upon a Pike, The Night Before Christmas, Divine Comedy, etc.

He also played at the Sovremennik Theatre in the play The Monument by Enn Vetemaa staged by Valery Fokin (premiered in 1977).

Since 1983, he starred in Yermolova Theatre's version of The Dresser by Ronald Harwood.

Zinovy Gerdt also worked in dubbing many foreign films for Soviet release.

He had his cinematic debut in 1958 in an episodic role in the film Man from Planet Earth. Gerdt is known primarily as a master of episodic, mostly comedic roles. In total, to actor's credit are more than 70 films.

In the 1960s, he appeared in the films Michel and Mishutka (1961), Returned Music (1964), Want-Believe, Do not Want ... (1964), The Year As Life (1965), Green Light (1965), City of Masters (1965), Avdotya Pavlovna (1966), July Rain (1966), At the Thirteenth Hour of the Night (1968), Zigzag of Success (1969) and others.

Recognition of the public came to the actor after the first major roles – Kukushkin in the film Magician (1967, directed by Pyotr Todorovsky) and Panikovsky in the film adaptation of Ilya Ilf and Yevgeny Petrov's novel The Golden Calf (1968, directed by Mikhail Schweitzer).

In the 1970s, new films appeared with the participation of Gerdt: Taymyr Calls You (1970), Urban Romance (1970), As Ilf and Petrov rode a tram (1971), Stoves of the Shop (1972), Carnival (1972), The Car, the Violin and the Dog Spot (1974), The Straw Hat (1974), The Key without the Right to Transfer (1976), The Draw (1976), Walking through the Flours (1974) ), The Twelve Chairs (1977), The Life of Beethoven (1978), Three Men in a Boat (1979), The Meeting Place Cannot Be Changed (1979).

In the 1980s and 1990s, the actor continued to act actively in films: Adam marries Eve (1980), Say a Word for the Poor Hussar (1980), Fairy tales... fairy tales... fairy tales of the old Arbat (1982), I'll wait for you (1982), Boys (1983), Military field novel (1983), Mary Poppins, Goodbye (1989), The Bindly and the King (1989), Intergirl (1989), The Inferno and the King (1989), Childhood Themes (1991), Lost in Siberia (1990), I am Ivan, you are Abram (1993), Life and Extraordinary Adventures of Private Ivan Chonkin (1994), Simple-minded (1994), Inspector (1996) and others.

Zinovy Gerdt also worked on television. He was the first host of one of the most popular Soviet television programs Kinopanorama, the first season of which was aired in 1962.

In the 1990s, he created and hosted the popular talk show Tea Club.

Gerdt performed as a screenwriter of the musical I Will Not Be Any More (1975).

Zinovy Gerdt died in Moscow on 18 November 1996. He was buried at the Kuntsevo Cemetery in Moscow.

== Personal life ==
Zinovy Gerdt's first wife was Maria Ivanovna Novikova, whom he met at the theater studio. They had a son, Vsevolod (b. 1945). Zinovy met his second wife, Tatyana Pravdina, in the Middle East in 1960 during a theatrical tour. She was an interpreter from Arabic, who was assigned to help the theater. At first, Tatiana negatively perceived Zinovy's courtship, but then a romance ensued between them. Immediately after returning from the tour, they left their families and decided to get married. Their marriage lasted 36 years. From her first marriage, Tatyana Pravdina had a daughter – Ekaterina. Gerdt adopted her by giving her his name.

== Legacy ==
In Kyiv, at the intersection of Proreznaya and Khreshchatyk streets, in 1998 a monument to Panikovsky (the character of the novel "The Golden Calf") was erected, the prototype of the monument was Zinovy Gerdt, who played the role of Panikovsky in the adaptation of the novel.

Zinovy Gerdt is an honorary citizen of Sebezh.

In 2004, in the park of Sebezh, where the artist's parents' home was located, a foundation stone was installed at the site of the future monument, where local poets and artists hold creative meetings.

A monument in Sebezh by sculptor Oleg Yershov in honor of Zinovy Gerdt was revealed to the public in 2011.

In 2001, the first edition of the book "Zyama – it's Gerdt!" was published, in which Gerdt is remembered by Eldar Ryazanov, Eduard Uspensky, Pyotr Todorovsky, Arkady Arkanov, Grigori Gorin, Viktor Shenderovich and others. The authors of the book are Tatyana Pravdina and Yakov Groisman.

In 2010, the publishing house Zebra E, AST published the book "Knight of Conscience" by Zinovy Gerdt. Pravdina, condemned the book as a composition of unduly attributed and inaccurate texts.

== Honours and awards ==
- Order of the Red Star (1947)
- Honored Artist of the RSFSR (1959)
- People's Artist of the RSFSR (1969)
- Order of the Patriotic War, 1st class (1985)
- People's Artist of the USSR (1990)
- Order "For Merit to the Fatherland", 3rd class (1996)
- Award Kinotavr in nomination "The Prize of the Presidential Council for the creative career" (1996)

== Filmography ==
- 1961: 20,000 Leagues Across the Land as Narrator (voice)
- 1962: Nine Days in One Year as Narrator (voice)
- 1962: Seven Nannies as Shamsky
- 1962: The Story of a Crime (Short) as Narrator (voice)
- 1966: The City of Masters as Artist
- 1966: Year as Long as Life as Bornstedt
- 1968: Magician as Viktor Kukushkin
- 1968: The Golden Calf as Mikhail Samuelevich Panikovsky
- 1968: Zigzag of Success as Narrator (voice)
- 1970: Two Days of Miracles as Narrator (voice)
- 1971: Shadow as Finance minister
- 1972: Happy Go Lucky as 2nd professor
- 1972: Taming of the Fire as Arthur Matveevich Kartashov, lecturer
- 1972: Dauria as Tsarist General Semenov
- 1972: Ilf and Petrov Rode a Tram as Captain Mazuchcho, animal trainer
- 1974: The Straw Hat (TV Mini-Series) as monsieur Tardivo
- 1974: Adventures in a City that does not Exist as Counsellor (voice)
- 1975: The Flight of Mr. McKinley as Mr. McKinley (voice)
- 1976-1979: Adventures of Captain Wrongel (TV Series) as Captain Christopher Bonifatievich Wrongel (voice)
- 1977: The Twelve Chairs (TV miniseries) as Narrator (voice)
- 1977: Practical Joke as Karl Yolikov
- 1977: The Key That Should Not Be Handed On as Oleg Trigorievich
- 1979: The Meeting Place Cannot Be Changed (TV Mini-Series) as Mikhail Mikhailovich Bomze
- 1979: Three Men in a Boat (TV Movie) as Grave keeper
- 1980: The Wife Has Left as Sosed
- 1980: Rafferty as Alex Resser (voice)
- 1981: Say a Word for the Poor Hussar (TV Movie) as Lev Pertsovsky as dealer of parrots
- 1982: Fairy tales... fairy tales... fairy tales of the old Arbat as Christopher
- 1982: The Donkey's Hide as poet Orevuar
- 1983: Boys as associated judge
- 1983: Wartime Romance as Cinema Administrator
- 1983: Mary Poppins, Goodbye (TV Movie) as Admiral Boom
- 1985: The Fabulous Journey of Mr. Bilbo Baggins the Hobbit as Professor J. R. R. Tolkien's voice
- 1989: Intergirl as Boris Semyonovich
- 1989: The Drayman and the King as Arie Leib
- 1991: Lost in Siberia as Levenson
- 1993: Me Ivan, You Abraham as Zalman
- 1994: Life and Extraordinary Adventures of Private Ivan Chonkin as Moisei Stalin
- 1997: War is Over. Please Forget... as actor
