= Amnesty of 1953 =

Soviet amnesty

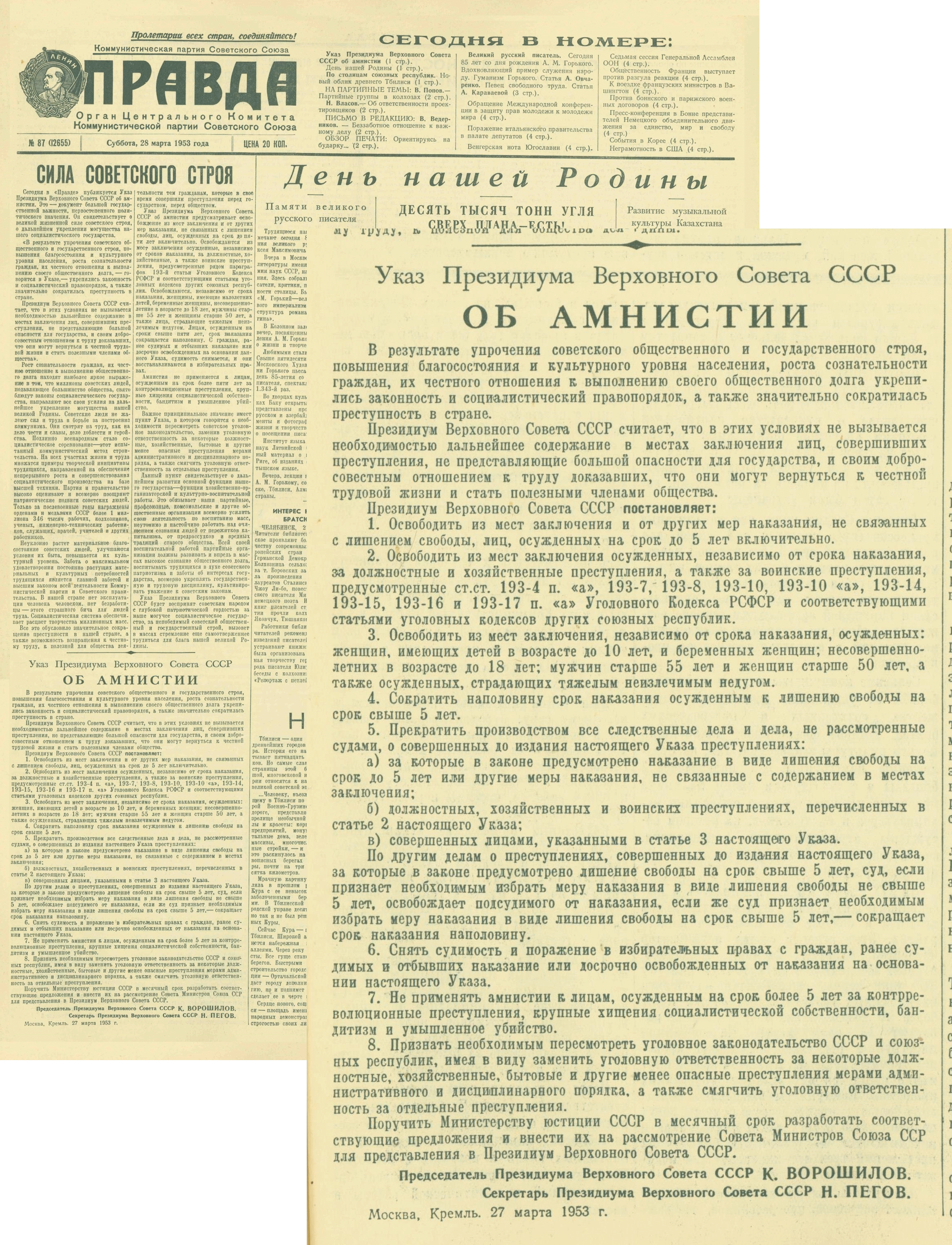
Decree on the Amnesty in the Pravda newspaper of 28 March 1953

The Amnesty of 1953 (Russian: Амнистия 1953 года) was the largest amnesty in the history of the Soviet Union (and in the history of Russia) in terms of the number of the released persons. It was declared by the March 27, 1953 Decree of the Supreme Soviet of the Soviet Union on the Amnesty. Since it was signed by Kliment Voroshilov, it was initially known as the Voroshilov's amnesty. Later it has become known as Beria's amnesty, because it was initiated by March 26, 1953 Lavrenty Beria's draft. Between 1.2 million and 1.35 million persons were freed.

The amnesty was applied to:

- all persons with imprisonment term up to 5 years
- all persons convicted of malfeasance and economic crimes, as well as for some minor military crimes
- all women with children of age up to 10 years
- all pregnant women
- all children up to 18 years old
- all men older than 55
- all women older than 50
- all persons with grave incurable diseases

The amnesty was not applied to people with term over 5 years convicted for counter-revolutionary crimes, major theft of socialist property, banditry, and murder. Other acts of the amnesty included the reduction of imprisonment terms, dismissing unfinished criminal proceedings which fit the above criteria, etc.

The amnesty was followed with a considerable rise of criminal activities, therefore it was partially rolled back and many criminal amnestees were imprisoned again.

== The Gulag crisis ==
By 1953, the system of correctional labor institutions of the Ministry of Internal Affairs (MVD) was in a deep systemic crisis. One of its most pressing problems was the extremely low productivity of the prisoners’ forced labor. On the one hand, prisoners had little or no material or personal incentive to work; on the other, the costs of maintaining, organizing, and guarding this workforce made their labor unprofitable. The management of the MVD took measures to improve labor productivity. From the late 1940s, some industrial facilities run by the ministry began paying prisoners wages, restoring the practice of parole for exceeding production quotas, counting workdays towards the reduction of prison sentences. These practices had been prohibited in 1939.

The abolition of the death penalty in 1947 had a severe consequence for the Gulag. In the camps and colonies a portion of the prisoners who were sentenced to 20-25 years, perceived their terms as life imprisonment and no longer feared additional punishment. Prisoners of this category easily committed murders, including for minor reasons, for example, avoiding working in the winter by being placed in a detention facility. The Bitch Wars, a violent conflict between different groups of prisoners, was also approaching its peak. On one side were prisoners who had initially cooperated with the camp administration, along with those who joined them ("bitches"). On the other were prisoners who adhered to the traditional rules and norms of the criminal underworld, known as the "thieves' law".

Other groups of prisoners also emerged and grew, organized along ethnic, political, and other lines. In particular, Ukrainian nationalist groups gained significant influence in many camps. They often arrived as closely organized groups, united by a strong national cause and possessing experience in organized resistance to the authorities, clandestine activity, and counter-intelligence work. These various groups engaged in fierce competition for resources, lower-level positions within the camp administration, and more favorable conditions of imprisonment.

As a result of these developments, camp authorities increasingly lost control over their institutions in the overcrowded prisons and camps of the late 1940s and early 1950s. At the beginning of 1951, the Gulag leadership reported a sharp increase in organized resistance to camp authorities, including murders or attempted murders of officials and assaults on guards. There were cases in which entire camps effectively fell under the control of criminal groups. In some instances, camp officials were simply afraid to enter the camp grounds. From the beginning of 1952, according to historian Vladimir Kozlov, who studied the MVD's archival reports, "operational information began to resemble a chronicle of military operations."

These problems were a major reason for introducing the 1953 Amnesty, as the Soviet government sought to reduce the overcrowded and increasingly unmanageable prison system and address the broader crisis of forced prisoner labor.

== See also ==
- The Cold Summer of 1953, a 1988 Soviet crime film with the plot based on the post-amnesty crime rise
- Bitch Wars, armed confrontations that occurred in the Gulags between 1945 and 1953
