= Boris Brozhovsky =

Soviet cinematographer (1935–2022)

- Борис Брожовский
- Brozhovsky during the filming of Nikolai Vavilov (1990)
- Born: 26 July 1935; Moscow, Russian SFSR, Soviet Union
- Died: 14 January 2022 (aged 86); Russia
- Occupation: Cinematographer
- Years active: 1961–2005
- Spouse: Nina Popova

Boris Leonidovich Brozhovsky (Russian: Борис Леонидович Брожовский; 26 July 1935 – 14 January 2022) was a Soviet and Russian cinematographer who made over 40 films.

== Life and career ==
Brozhovsky was born to the family of film director Leonid Brozhovsky and his wife Lydia. In 1959 he graduated from VGIK. From 1960, he worked at the Mosfilm film studio.

He became a laureate of the USSR State Prize in 1989, for the film The Cold Summer of 1953, and an Honored Art Worker of the Russian Federation on 18 November 2000.

Brozhovsky was married to actress Nina Popova, best known for her role as Zhenya in the Soviet TV series Day by Day. He died on 14 January 2022, at the age of 86.

== Awards ==
- 1989 — Laureate of the USSR State Prize for artwork "The Cold Summer of 1953".
- 2000 — Honored Artist of the Russian Federation.

== Bibliography ==
- Sergei Yutkevich. Cinema: Encyclopedic Dictionary (1986)
- Anna M. Lawton. Imaging Russia 2000: Film and Facts (2004)
- Lyudmila Sokolova. Mosfilm. Yesterday, today and always (2021)
