= Tamara Degtyaryova =

Tamara Degtyaryova

Tamara Vasilyevna Degtyaryova (Russian: Тамара Васильевна Дегтярёва; 29 May 1944 – 9 August 2018) was a Russian stage, television and film actress. In 1979, she received the State Prize of the USSR for her role in the television series Eternal Call. In 2005 she was made a People's Artist of Russia.

== Early life ==
Degtyaryova was born in Kaliningrad (present-day Korolyov, Moscow Oblast), in 1944. Her parents were factory workers and as Degtyaryova was ill as a child, her mother stopped work to look after her.

== Career ==
She graduated from the State Institute of Theatrical Art, Moscow, in 1965 and performed with the Moscow Youth Theatre from 1965 to 1970. In 1970, she was invited to join the Sovremennik Theater, and played over 30 roles at the theatre during her career. She performed in plays including Three Sisters (in the role of Anifisa), Pygmalion (in the role of Mrs Pearce) and Twelfth Night (in the role of Olivia). In later years, she occasionally appeared at other theatres, including a production of The Cherry Orchard at the Anton Chekhov Theatre in 1990, and the play Gadina at the New Drama Theatre in 1999.

Degtyaryova also appeared in films and television series, including Light in the Window (1980), Nikolai Vavilov (1990), Seeking a Man and Cool Route. Her most well-known role was as Agatha Savelieva in Eternal Call, a long-running Russian television drama series.

Degtyaryova taught acting in a number of educational institutions in Russia including Gerasimov Institute of Cinematography and the Russian Academy of Theatre Arts.

In November 2012, Degtyaryova had a leg amputated due to an untreated infection, and she spent the next two years convalescing. She then returned to perform on stage with the use of a wheelchair, including the role of Evdokia in the play Women's Time.

Degtyaryova died in Moscow on 9 August 2018 at the age of 74.

== Personal life ==
Degtyaryova was married for ten years to stage director Yuri Pogrebnichenko, whom she met while with the Moscow Youth Theatre, until they divorced.
