= Trouble (1977 film) =

- Russian: Беда
- Directed by: Dinara Asanova
- Written by: Izrail Metter
- Produced by: M. Petushin
- Starring: Aleksey Petrenko; Yelena Kuzmina; Lidiya Fedoseyeva-Shukshina; Georgy Burkov; Gennadi Dyudyayev
- Cinematography: Anatoly Lapshov; Nikolai Stroganov
- Edited by: Raisa Izakson
- Music by: Yevgeny Krylatov
- Production company: Lenfilm
- Release date: 1977
- Running time: 90 min.
- Country: Soviet Union
- Language: Russian

Trouble (Russian: Беда, romanized: Beda) is a 1977 Soviet drama film directed by Dinara Asanova.

== Plot ==
The film tells about a weak but good person who starts drinking and as a result loses his job, family and commits a crime.

== Cast ==
- Aleksey Petrenko as Vyacheslav Kuligin
- Yelena Kuzmina as Alevtina Ivanovna, Kuligin’s mother
- Lidiya Fedoseyeva-Shukshina as Zinaida, Kuligin’s wife
- Georgy Burkov as Nikolay Maslakov
- Gennadi Dyudyayev as Gusev
- Fyodor Odinokov as Uncle Kolya
- Maria Vinogradova as Klava

== Critical response ==
Stanislav Rassadin, noting that the film very clearly reflects the correctness of the anti-alcohol campaign, however, the creators focused all their efforts on showing the degradation of the individual, and therefore the film is guilty of "straightforward didacticism".

According to Alexander Fedorov, "despite all the anti-alcohol pathos and Aleksey Petrenko's convincing performance, 'Trouble' still can't be considered Asanova's best work: the film's dramatic approach is visibly straightforward, and its emotional impact is a bit over the top".
