= Nina Popova (actress) =

Russian actress (1945–2026)

Nina Popovа
- Нина Попова
- Popova in Day by Day (1971)
- Born: 20 March 1945; Bugulma, Tatar ASSR, Russian SFSR, Soviet Union
- Died: 7 September 2026 (aged 81); Moscow, Russia
- Resting place: Vostryakovskoye Cemetery
- Occupation: Actress
- Years active: 1966–2026
- Spouse: Boris Brozhovsky (died 2022)

Nina Georgievna Popova (Russian: Нина Георгиевна Попова; 20 March 1945 – 7 September 2026) was a Soviet and Russian actress. She appeared in Day by Day, Investigation Led by Experts, Mickey Spillane's Mike Hammer.

Popova was awarded with the titles Honored Artist of the RSFSR (1984) and the Order of Friendship (2020).

In 1975, while filming Diamonds for Maria, she met cinematographer Boris Brozhovsky, with whom she was married for 47 years until his death in 2022.

Popova died on 7 September 2026, at the age of 81.

== Selected filmography ==
- Neutral Waters (1968) as Irina
- Touches to the Portrait of V. I. Lenin (1968) as secretary
- Day by Day (1971–1972) as Zhenya Yakusheva
- Investigation Led by Experts: Red-handed (1971) as director of a beer bar
- Mickey Spillane's Mike Hammer (1984) as Hair Do
