= Lyudmila Polyakova =

Soviet and Russian actress

- Людмила Полякова
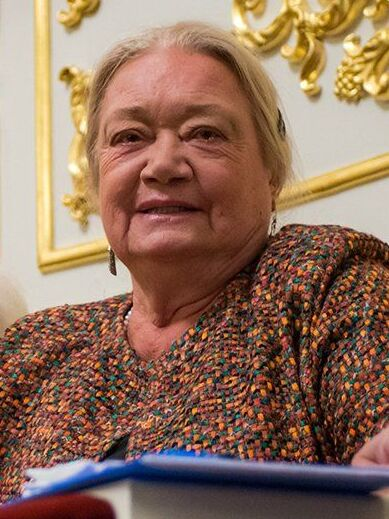
- Born: Lyudmila Petrovna Polyakova; 28 January 1939 (age 87); Moscow, USSR (now Russia)
- Occupation: Actress
- Years active: 1964–present
- Spouse: Vasily Bochkaryov (divorce)

Lyudmila Petrovna Polyakova (Russian: Людми́ла Петро́вна Поляко́ва; born January 28, 1939) is a Soviet and Russian actress; she is a People's Artist of Russia (1999).

== Biography ==
She graduated in 1964 from the Mikhail Shchepkin Higher Theatre School (course of Viktor Korshunov).

In the movie it is removed since 1967.

Since 1990, she has been an actress of Maly Theatre (Moscow).

== Awards ==
- Order For Merit to the Fatherland (2010)
- Order of Friendship (2006)
- People's Artist of Russia (1999)
- Honored Artist of the Russian Federation (1994)
- State Prize of the Russian Federation (2003)

== Selected filmography ==
- The Beginning of an Unknown Era (1967) as Pregnant peasant woman
- Agony (1974) as Paraskeva, Rasputin's wife
- The Ascent as (1977) as Demchikha
- An Almost Funny Story (1977) as a client at the hairdresser
- Citizen Nikanorova Waits for You (1978) as Verka
- Farewell (1983) as Darya's friend
- Humiliated and Insulted (1991) as Anna Ikhmeneva
- Turning (2002) as new maid
- Bimmer (2003) as Sobachikha
- High Security Vacation (2009) as Zinaida Obraztsova
- Once Upon a Time There Lived a Simple Woman (2011) as Paramonovna
- You All Infuriate Me (2017) as doctor
