= Dear, Dearest, Beloved, Unique... =

1984 film

- Film poster
- Directed by: Dinara Asanova
- Written by: Valeriy Priyomykhov
- Starring: Olga Mashnaya; Valeriy Priyomykhov
- Cinematography: Vladimir Ilyin
- Edited by: Tamara Lipartia
- Music by: Viktor Kisin
- Production company: Lenfilm
- Release date: 1984
- Running time: 70 minutes
- Country: Soviet Union
- Language: Russian

Dear, Dearest, Beloved, Unique ... (Russian: Милый, дорогой, любимый, единственный; translit. Milyy, dorogoy, lyubimyy, edinstvennyy ... ) is a 1984 Soviet drama film directed by Dinara Asanova. It was screened in the Un Certain Regard section at the 1985 Cannes Film Festival.

== Cast ==
- Olga Mashnaya as Anna
- Valeriy Priyomykhov as Vadim
- Lembit Ulfsak as German
- Larisa Umarova as Vera
- Nikolai Lavrov as Vsevolod
- Aleksandr Demyanenko as policeman
- Darya Moroz as baby girl
