= Citizen Nikanorova Waits for You =

- Russian: Вас ожидает гражданка Никанорова
- Directed by: Leonid Maryagin
- Written by: Viktor Merezhko
- Produced by: Anatoly Olontsev
- Starring: Natalya Gundareva; Borislav Brondukov
- Cinematography: Yuri Avdeyev; Vladimir Fridkin
- Edited by: Galina Spirina
- Music by: Yan Frenkel
- Production company: Mosfilm
- Release date: 1978
- Running time: 87 min.
- Country: Soviet Union
- Language: Russian

Citizen Nikanorova Waits for You (Russian: Вас ожидает гражданка Никанорова, romanized: Vas ozhidayet grazhdanka Nikanorova) is a 1978 Soviet romantic comedy-drama film directed by Leonid Maryagin.

== Plot ==
The rural queen is already tired of looking for her prince. And suddenly she discovers a new veterinarian in her house.

== Cast ==
- Natalya Gundareva as Katya Nikanorova
- Borislav Brondukov as Pavel Ivanovich Dyozhkin, veterinarian
- Yevgeny Kindinov as Zhenya, Dyozhkin's friend
- Ivan Ryzhov as Leopold Vasilyevich, collective farm chairman
- Mikhail Vaskov as Slava, collective farm chauffeur
- Gennadiy Frolov as Stepan, Nikanorova's familiar
- Lev Borisov as The Social Power
- Natalya Gushchina as Liza, Nikanorova's friend
- Vera Novikova as Tamara, Dyozhkin's assistant
- Valentina Berezutskaya as Aunt Lyuba, Nikanorova's neighbour
- Svetlana Kharitonova as neighbor Lyuda
- Lyudmila Polyakova as Verka
