= Live and Remember =

- Russian: Живи и помни
- Directed by: Aleksandr Proshkin
- Written by: Aleksandr Proshkin; Valentin Rasputin
- Produced by: Sergey Shumakov; Artem Vasilyev
- Starring: Darya Ekamasova; Mikhail Evlanov; Evgeniya Glushenko; Sergey Makovetsky; Anna Mikhalkova; Darya Moroz
- Cinematography: Aleksandr Karyuk; Gennady Karyuk
- Edited by: Natalya Kucherenko
- Music by: Aleksey Rybnikov
- Release date: 2008
- Country: Russia
- Language: Russian

Live and Remember (Russian: Живи и помни) is a 2008 Russian war drama film directed by Aleksandr Proshkin.

== Plot ==
In the Siberian village of Atamanovka, Nastya Guskova lives with her elderly in-laws while working on the collective farm and in the lumberyard alongside other women whose husbands are away fighting in the Great Patriotic War. Her husband, Andrey Guskov, has been at the front since the beginning of the conflict, having served in various roles, from a ski battalion near Moscow to reconnaissance near Smolensk, and later in a howitzer battery after being wounded at Stalingrad. When he’s discharged from a hospital in Novosibirsk in October 1944, he attempts a brief, unauthorized trip home but soon realizes he won’t be able to return to his unit on time, making him a deserter. Andrey hides in an abandoned cabin in the taiga, confiding only in Nastya and warning her not to reveal his presence. Eventually, Nastya becomes pregnant, a long-awaited joy tempered by the stigma and accusations of infidelity from her in-laws and the entire village, who believe she betrayed her husband presumed lost at the front.

As Victory Day approaches, the village gathers to celebrate and remember the fallen, mentioning Andrey among those lost without knowing that Nastya has kept his secret all along. Rumors of Andrey’s desertion prompt a police investigation led by Officer Burdak, who, with a group of men, begins to follow Nastya, suspecting she knows his whereabouts. Trying to evade them, Nastya rows across the river to warn her husband, but, realizing she cannot escape, she throws herself into the water and drowns. Her death shakes the community, and the villagers later mourn her, attributing her tragic end to the relentless pursuit she endured. The story ends in 1965, with a solitary Andrey living in the nearly abandoned Atamanovka, where a passing beacon keeper stops briefly to wish him well on the 20th anniversary of Victory Day, marking the passage of time and the unhealed scars left by the war.

== Cast ==
- Darya Ekamasova
- Mikhail Evlanov
- Evgeniya Glushenko
- Sergey Makovetsky
- Anna Mikhalkova
- Darya Moroz
