= Oleg Marusev =

Russian actor (1944–2021)

- Oleg Marusev in 2004
- Born: Oleg Fyodorovich Marusev; 2 October 1944; Tashkent, Uzbek SSR, Soviet Union
- Died: 14 April 2021 (aged 76); Moscow, Russia
- Occupations: actor, television presenter, theater teacher
- Years active: 1970–2021
- Spouse: Alla Maruseva
- Children: 1

Oleg Fyodorovich Marusev (Russian: Оле́г Фёдорович Ма́русев; 2 October 1944 – 14 April 2021) was a Russian film and theater actor, director. Honored Artist of Russia. Actor of Moscow Moon Theatre. Professor Graduate School of Film and Television Ostankino.

== Biography ==
Marusev was born in Tashkent. He spent his childhood in Kherson. In the late 1960s, after the end of Dnepropetrovsk State Theater School, he worked in the theater Gennady Yudenich's Skomorokh. But the authorities of the theater was not to the soul, and, after several years of persecution, the theater was disbanded.

Winner of the First Moscow Competition entertainers.

For two years Oleg Marusev was an entertainer in jazz orchestras under control of the legendary Eddie Rosner (in Moscow and Gomel), and continuing education, received diplomas as director at the State Institute of Theatre Arts (GITIS) and theatrologist The Kiev State Institute of Theatre and Cinema. Later, Oleg Marusev went on TV, where he worked for 35 years. During this time, he created 12 cycle programs. Leading Russian counterpart Bruce Forsyth's Hot Streak.

On July 16, 2010, he was awarded the Order of Friendship. In recent years, Oleg Marusev returned to the stage (Moon Theatre and solo performances).

== Selected filmography ==
- 1979 — The Return of the Senses as Rail
- 1997 — The Countess de Monsoreau as de Crillon
- 1998 — Who If Not Us as head teacher
- 2000 — Turetsky's Marsh as Goldybin
- 2004 — The Thieves and Prostitutes. The Prize — a Flight Into Space as US presidential candidate Larry
- 2004 — Yeralash as Appolinary Semyonovich
- 2005 — The Fall of the Empire as the owner of the attraction
- 2014 — In One Breath as Krasavin
- 2014 — The Fourth as Priest

== Awards and nominations ==
- Laureate of the First Moscow competition of performers
- Winner of the All-Union competition of young performers
- Honored Artist of Russia (1993)
- Order of Friendship (2010)
- Full member of the Russian Academy of Natural Sciences
