= Who If Not Us =

- Directed by: Valeriy Priyomykhov
- Written by: Valeriy Priyomykhov
- Produced by: Galina Shadur; Karen Shakhnazarov
- Starring: Yevgeny Krainov; Artur Smolyaninov; Valeriy Priyomykhov
- Cinematography: Aleksandr Nosovsky
- Edited by: Lyudmila Sviridenko
- Music by: Vladimir Martynov
- Production companies: Courier Film Studio; Mosfilm
- Release date: 1998
- Running time: 89 min.
- Country: Russia
- Language: Russian

Who If Not Us (Russian: Кто, если не мы, romanized: Kto, esli ne my) is a Russian drama film by actor and director Valeriy Priyomykhov.

Filming began in 1993, but due to lack of funding the film didn't appear on the screen for 5 years.

== Plot ==
Dreaming to get rich, teenagers Snakes and Tolya plunder the city's department store and as a result one find themselves in a colony, another in a lycee, which differs little from a colony. Having learned truly what solitude is, Snake accidentally gets acquainted with Gennady, an old man just like him, alone and difficult, dismissed from the police.

== Cast ==
- Yevgeny Krainov as Snakes
- Artur Smolyaninov as Tolya
- Valeriy Priyomykhov as Gennady Samokhin
- Lyanka Gryu as Irochka
- Tatyana Dogileva as head of parent committee
- Albert Filozov as class teacher Anatoly Ignatievich
- Yekaterina Vasilyeva as mother at the parents' meeting
- Aleksei Panin as policeman
- Nikolai Chindyajkin as colony supervisor
- Ivan Okhlobystin as pathologist
- Nadezhda Markina as Tolya's mother
- Oleg Marusev as head teacher
- Tatyana Kravchenko as Samokhin's girlfriend

== Awards and nominations ==
- Taormina Film Fest: Special Jury Prize (Valeriy Priyomykhov) — win
- Kinotavr: Full-Length Film — nom; Prize of Presidential Council (Valeriy Priemykhov)
- Oulu International Children's and Youth Film Festival: Starboy Award (Valeriy Priyomykhov) — nom
- Nika Award: Best Screenplay (Valeriy Priyomykhov) — win; Best Director (Valeriy Priyomykhov), Best Actor (Valeriy Priyomykhov) — nom
- Artek Film Festival: Young Artist Awards (Artur Smolyaninov) — win
