= Mikhail Ancharov =

Russian writer (1923–1990)

- Born: Mikhail Leonidovich Ancharov; 28 March 1923; Moscow, USSR
- Died: 11 July 1990 (aged 67)
- Resting place: Moscow, USSR
- Occupation: Writer
- Writing career
- Period: 1937–1990
- Genre: fiction

Mikhail Leonidovich Ancharov (Russian: Михаил Леонидович Анчаров; 28 March 1923 — 11 July 1990) was a Russian writer, poet, bard, playwright, screenwriter and artist.

== Biography ==
Mikhail Ancharov was born in Moscow on 28 March 1923 to Leonid Mikhailovich Ancharov, a design engineer from Kharkiv, and his wife Yevgenia Isaevna Ancharova, a native of Nizhyn. In 1941, Mikhail Ancharov studied at the Architectural Institute and then enlisted in the Red Army as a member of the airborne troops. During World War II, he was enrolled in the Military Institute of Foreign Languages of the Red Army, graduating in 1944. As a military translator of the Chinese language he was sent to the Far Eastern Front, and posted in Manchuria. He was decommissioned from the army in 1947 and went on to graduate from the painting department of the Surikov Moscow State Art Institute.

As early as 1937, Ancharov composed songs inspired by poems by Alexander Green, Boris Kornilov, Vira Inber. During the war, he began writing songs to accompany his own poems, performing them to his own accompaniment on a seven-string guitar. He is considered the founder of the genre of author's song ("the first bard"); Vladimir Vysotsky called Ancharov his teacher.

Russian writer, poet, literary critic and journalist Dmitry Bykov wrote on his blog: "You see, Ancharov was a very diversely gifted person. A remarkable poet, bard, one of the first in Russia. A very original artist, an extremely interesting prose writer, a talented musician. A man of diverse and amazing gifts. When a person is so torn in all directions, it is no wonder that, being talented in everything, he does not reach the heights in almost anything."

Ancharov wrote a Soviet drama TV series called Day by Day. It ran for 17 episodes from 1971 to 1972. It was the first dramatic television series filmed by Soviet Central Television.In 1963, he wrote the TV screenplay for Апассионата (Apassionata).

After the war he expanded his oeuvre to include prose, most notably the novel Boxwood Forest. In 1966, he became a member of the Union of Writers of the USSR. He worked as a screenwriter for feature films.

Mikhail Ancharov died on 11 July 1990
