= A Simple Death =

1985 film

- Film poster
- Directed by: Alexander Kaidanovsky
- Written by: Alexander Kaidanovsky; Leo Tolstoy
- Starring: Valeriy Priyomykhov; Alisa Freindlich
- Cinematography: Yuri Klimenko
- Production company: Lenfilm
- Release date: 1985
- Country: Soviet Union
- Language: Russian

A Simple Death (Russian: Простая смерть, romanized: Prostaya Smert') is a 1985 Soviet drama film directed by Alexander Kaidanovsky, based on Leo Tolstoy's The Death of Ivan Ilyich. It was screened in the Un Certain Regard section at the 1987 Cannes Film Festival.

== Cast ==
- Valeriy Priyomykhov as Ivan Ilyich (voiced by Alexander Kaidanovsky)
- Alisa Freindlich as Praskovya Fyodorovna, Ivan Ilyich's wife
- Vytautas Paukste as Mikhail Danilovich, doctor
- Mikhail Danilov as narrator
- Karina Moritts as Liza
- Tamara Timofeyeva as nanny
- Stanislav Churkin as priest
- Anatoli Khudoleyev as Pyotr
- Kolya Vaskevich as Vanya
