= The Black Veil =

- Russian: Чёрная вуаль
- Directed by: Aleksandr Proshkin
- Written by: Aleksandr Amfiteatrov; Andrey Dmitriev; Stanislav Govorukhin
- Produced by: Yuri Ginzburg; Leonid Yarmolnik
- Starring: Irina Metlitskaya; Aleksandr Abdulov; Tatyana Vasileva; Sergey Makovetsky; Irina Rozanova
- Cinematography: Boris Brozhovsky
- Edited by: Yelena Mikhaylova
- Music by: Eugen Doga
- Release date: 1995
- Country: Russia
- Language: Russian

The Black Veil (Russian: Чёрная вуаль) is a 1995 Russian crime film directed by Aleksandr Proshkin.

== Plot ==
The film tells about a rich and charming philanthropist who was found dead in his house. The investigator finds a blue envelope and concludes that the philanthropist was killed.

== Cast ==
- Irina Metlitskaya
- Aleksandr Abdulov
- Tatyana Vasileva
- Sergey Makovetsky
- Irina Rozanova
- Natalya Petrova
- Margarita Shubina
- Vladimir Ilyin
- Pyotr Yandanov
- Valeri Doronin
