= The Captain's Daughter (2000 film) =

- Russian: Русский бунт
- Directed by: Aleksandr Proshkin
- Written by: Alexander Pushkin; Galina Arbuzova; Stanislav Govorukhin; Vladimir Zheleznikov
- Produced by: Raphaël Berdugo; Igor Bortnikov; Vitaly Koshman
- Starring: Mateusz Damiecki; Karolina Gruszka; Vladimir Mashkov; Sergei Makovetsky; Vladimir Ilyin
- Cinematography: Sergey Yurizditsky
- Edited by: Tatyana Egorycheva
- Music by: Vladimir Martynov
- Production company: Profit Cinema
- Release date: 2000
- Running time: 130 min.
- Countries: Russia; France
- Language: Russian

The Captain's Daughter (Russian: Русский бунт, romanized: Russkiy bunt) is a 2000 Russian drama film directed by Aleksandr Proshkin. The film is an adaptation of the historical novel The Captain's Daughter (1836) by Alexander Pushkin.

== Plot ==
The film takes place during the reign of Catherine the Great. Yemelyan Pugachev declared himself Emperor Peter III of Russia, uniting around him detachments of Cossacks and fugitive serfs. Meanwhile, in the Belogorsk fortress, officer Pyotr Grinyov met with the daughter of Captain Mironov, whom he fell in love with so much that he did not notice the signs of future trouble.

== Cast ==
- Mateusz Damiecki as Pyotr Grinyov
- Karolina Gruszka as Masha Mironova
- Vladimir Mashkov as Yemelyan Pugachev
- Sergei Makovetsky as Aleksei Shvabrin
- Vladimir Ilyin as Savelyich
- Yury Belyayev as Commandant Mironov
- Natalya Egorova as Vasilisa Egorovna
- Yury Kuznetsov as Ivan Ignatyevich
- Olga Antonova as Catherine the Great
- Juozas Budraitis as Governor of Orenburg
- Pyotr Zaychenko as Pyanov
- Maria Mironova as Kharlova
