= An Unusual Concert =

1946 puppet show by Sergey Obraztsov

DVD cover

An Unusual Concert (1946) (Russian: Необыкновенный концерт, Neobyknovennyj Kontsert) is one of Sergey Obraztsov's best known puppet shows. It is considered a masterpiece of puppeteering and satirizes bad performers. It appeals both to children and adults.

According to Obraztsov, An Unusual Concert is a theatrical revue or variety show that does not satirize specific genres so much as performers that spoil these genres with their poor performances and poor taste. An Unusual Concert is one of the best-known puppet performances of the 20th century. It premiered in 1946 and has been performed over 10,000 times all around the world.

The show demonstrates rather complicated puppeteering techniques. For example, there is a dancing couple whose tango movements require the skill of seven puppeteers.

== History ==
Back in 1939, poet Alexander Vvedensky brought his puppet play for adults "Variety Concert" to the Obraztsov Theater. At Obraztsov's request, the play was reworked for children and was a parody of popular concert programs and performers of those years, and the actors in it were animals. However, the production was postponed, then the war began, and Vvedensky's play remained in the archive of the theater. Between Vvedensky's play and the "Unusual Concert" created later, one can find many similarities in style, mood, character of dramaturgy, parodied genres.

Work on a new play began in the spring of 1944. The play was thought out for almost a year. In the autumn of 1945 the first sketches of the dolls were ready, then rehearsals began. The satirical performance created as a funny parody of the standard techniques and stereotypes of many variety concerts of that time, and was called "An Ordinary Concert" (Обыкновенный концерт); the premiere took place on June 19, 1946. The production was a huge audience success, but after three years, culture officials banned the performance. The play, in which there was no positive hero, was accused of "denigrating the Soviet stage."

Obraztsov found a way out of the situation by introducing a "positive character" into the performance: he himself decided to host the concert. At the insistence of officials, several more numbers were removed from the program. In 1968, a full concert was revived in the new edition of the play. Obraztsov changed its original name to a different one — "An Unusual Concert". At the same time, he managed to keep the entire program unchanged, including the brilliant lines of the entertainer (author — Alexey Bondi), which were pronounced by Zinovy Gerdt, sparkling humor and satirical images of all the characters. The premiere of the second edition took place on March 26, 1968.

== Concert program ==
- choral singing: solemn cantata "Vitamin" performed by the combined chapel of the regional pharmacy administration
- chamber music: virtuoso cellist Apollo Apollonovich Peredelkin - master of "improving the classics" with singer Veronika Nesmykalskaya
- opera: mock-aria performed by "the singer of the Italian school Sidor Sidorovich Sidorov-Sidorini"
- operetta: scene and duet from the operetta "My Grandmother's Bouquet"
- avant-garde music: quantum-musical construction "World Perception" performed by the quintet "Balyabadalam-69"
- circus acts: the magician Tarhun ibn Abracadabra Jr. and his assistant Scheherazada Stepanovna, the tamer Euripides Samokhin, the tamer Stella Suisse (nee Stepanida Svistunova), ballroom and variety dances (tango, tap dance), The Gypsy Choir of the Polar Philharmonic under the direction of Pasha Pashin
- foreign stage: French singer Marie Effrayant (an allusion to Juliette Gréco, Mireille Mathieu or Marie Laforêt), Latin American trio "Los Selftortuchos"

and entertainer Eduard Aplombov.
