= The Cold Summer of 1953 =

- Original film poster
- Directed by: Aleksandr Proshkin
- Written by: Edgar Dubrovsky
- Starring: Valeriy Priyomykhov; Anatoli Papanov; Viktor Stepanov; Nina Usatova
- Cinematography: Boris Brozhovsky
- Music by: Vladimir Martynov
- Production company: Mosfilm
- Release date: 1988
- Running time: 97 minutes
- Country: Soviet Union
- Language: Russian

The Cold Summer of 1953 (Russian: Холодное лето пятьдесят третьего…, romanized: Kholodnoe leto pyat'desyat tret'ego) is a 1988 Soviet crime thriller directed by Aleksandr Proshkin. The film is set during the tumultuous period directly after the death of Joseph Stalin in 1953. It was the last film starring the Soviet actor Anatoly Papanov, who died after filming his final scene in August 1987.

== Plot ==
As a result of Beria's Amnesty of 1953, a large number of criminals were released and pardoned. Upon release they quickly began to form communities, committing robberies, murders and rapes nationwide: Many places in the USSR were subject to rampant criminality and looting at the hands of now fully-pardoned inmates.

The main protagonists are Sergei Basargin (nicknamed "Luzga"), who is a former Military Intelligence Captain, veteran and POW. He is friends with a fellow political exile called Nikolai Pavlovich Starobogatov ("Kopalych"), former Chief Engineer. Both of these men were forced into exile after being falsely accused of crimes against the state by Stalin's regime.

At dusk, the village is infiltrated by a company of six prisoners led by the experienced crook Baron. They take Ivan Zotov hostage in his own home, ransacking it and arming themselves with his guns. In order to survive, Zotov has to turn on the village and side with the criminals, by hatching an escape plan for them, and being forced to help them stay unnoticed until they can lure out and kill the village's policeman Mankov in order to get their hands on his submachine gun, which would give them total control over the villagers.

After the first shots are fired and Mankov is dead, the bandits plan springs into action, and they quickly force the villagers into a barn, locking the door and shutting in everyone except Lydia, who they force to cook them a meal, Luzga and Kopalych, who they make dig a grave for Mankov, Fadeich, who they've decided to kill, and Zotov, who they keep as "one of them".

Before being captured, the deaf-mute cook Lydia locks her attractive young daughter Shura into another barn in order to hide her from the criminals, one of whom, driven by lust, tries everything in his power to get the lock off of the barn door in order to get to her. No matter how hard he tries, he doesn't succeed, and furiously storms back to the rest of his community, taking out his frustrations on Lydia. During a quiet moment after this, Lydia goes back to the barn where her daughter is, unlocking the door and telling her to escape into the nearby woods. Being spotted by the same lusty disordered person, she is chased into the woods and forced onto the ground by the man. Luzga, having observed all of this, silently approaches the villain from behind and stabs him with a shiv, killing him.

Luzga comforts Shura, still in shock from being assaulted, before leaving her in order to scout for recidivists, now being armed with the pistol. After a short search, he sees the oldest evil spirit, Mikhalych having a conversation with Kopalych about the recent downfall of Beria. Mikhalych notices Luzga approaching over Kopalych's shoulder and fires a shot at him. Only lightly wounded, Luzga falls to the ground, feigning death, before suddenly shooting and killing Mikhalych. Not long after reuniting with Kopalych, they pick off another lone prisoner and move towards the village, guns at the ready.

The three remaining disabled persons, realizing half of their men have been killed, begin a group search on the two rebels. Luzga orders Kopalych to create a distraction for the criminals, and implores him to take proper cover during this, but Kopalych stands upright to draw more of the spirits' attention, and in his sacrifice, is shot dead. Thanks to Kopalych's act of selflessness, Luzga successfully guns down all three of the criminals.

In the evening, as the villagers are deciding amongst themselves what to do with the bodies, who to bury and where, they notice one body missing. In a tragic twist of fate, the leader of the prisoners survived being shot, playing dead for hours on end only to shoot and kill Shura. After hearing the girls mother weeping, Luzga goes to investigate what's happened, only to be shot at by the still-living villain. After dodging his remaining shots, Luzga chases after the man, threatening to beat him to death with his bare hands. The chase ends with them both having waded out into stomach-deep water, Luzga eventually forcing the man under water.

In a scene two years after the events of the movie, Luzga is seen walking the streets of Moscow. He visits the relatives of Kopalych, who were asked by him to denounce him after his arrest, and informs them of his death. Luzga also reveals to them that Kopalych was never guilty of his crimes, and that he'd asked them to disown him so that they themselves wouldn't be persecuted by Stalin's regime for being associated with him.

== Cast ==
- Valeriy Priyomykhov as Sergey Basargin, veteran and military intelligence captain
- Anatoli Papanov as Nikolai Pavlovich Starobogatov, former chief engineer
- Viktor Stepanov as policeman Mankov, killed by the bandits
- Nina Usatova as Lydia Matveevna, mute cook
- Zoya Buryak as Shura, Lydia's daughter
- Yury Kuznetsov as Ivan Zotov, director of the trading post
- Vladimir Kashpur as Fadeich, director of the wharf
- Elizabeth Solodova as Starobogatov's wife
- Boris Plotnikov as Nikolai, Starobogatov's son
- Vladimir Golovin as Baron, professional criminal and gang leader
- Sergey Vlasov as Witek, criminal
- Andrew Dudarenko as Mikhalych, criminal
- Alexander Zavyalov as Mukha, criminal
- Alexey Kolesnik as Hook, criminal
- Viktor Kosykh as Baklan, criminal
