= The Vacancy (1981 film) =

- Russian: Вакансия
- Directed by: Margarita Mikaelyan
- Written by: Margarita Mikaelyan
- Starring: Leonid Kayurov; Rolan Bykov; Oleg Tabakov; Viktor Proskurin; Yekaterina Vasilyeva
- Cinematography: Genri Abramyan
- Music by: Gennady Gladkov
- Release date: 1981
- Country: Soviet Union
- Language: Russian

The Vacancy (Russian: Вакансия) is a 1981 Soviet musical comedy film directed by Margarita Mikaelyan. It is based on the play A Profitable Position by Alexander Ostrovsky.

== Plot ==
The story follows a young, honest, married man who, despite being the nephew of an influential uncle, refuses to exploit his advantageous position.

== Cast ==
- Leonid Kayurov
- Rolan Bykov
- Oleg Tabakov
- Viktor Proskurin
- Yekaterina Vasilyeva
- Marina Yakovleva
- Tatyana Dogileva
- Vera Ivleva
