= Valeriy Priyomykhov =

Soviet and Russian actor, film director, screenwriter and author

- Born: 26 December 1943; Belogorsk, Amur Oblast, RSFSR, USSR
- Died: 25 August 2000 (aged 56); Moscow, Russia
- Resting place: Kuntsevo Cemetery, Moscow
- Education: VGIK
- Occupations: Actor, film director, screenwriter, writer

Valeriy Mikhaylovich Priyomykhov (Russian: Валерий Михайлович Приёмыхов; 27 December 1943 – 25 August 2000) was a Soviet and Russian actor, film director, screenwriter and author.

== Awards ==
- Winner of USSR State Prize:
  - 1984 – for the film Boys
  - 1989 — for the film Cold Summer of 1953
- 1988 – Best Actor in a Soviet Screen Magazine
- 1993 – Honoured Art Worker of the Russian Federation
- 1999 – Nika Award – Nomination for Best Screenplay – for the film Who If Not Us
- 1999 – Special Prize of 45-th International Film Festival in Taormina (Italy) – for the film Who If Not Us
- 2000 – Winner of State Prize of the Russian Federation – for work for children and young people

== Filmography ==
=== Director ===
- Pants (Штаны) (1988)
- Migrants (Мигранты) (1991)
- Who If Not Us (Кто, если не мы) (1998)

=== Actor (selected) ===
- The Wife Has Left (Жена ушла) (1979)
- Dear, Dearest, Beloved, Unique... (Милый, дорогой, любимый, единственный) (1984)
- A Simple Death (Простая смерть) (1985)
- Cold Summer of 1953 (Холодное лето пятьдесят третьего) (1987)
- Time for Sorrow Hasn't Come Yet (1995)
- Crusader (Крестоносец) (1995)
- Mama Don't Cry (Мама не горюй) (1998)
- Who If Not Us (Кто, если не мы) (1998)

=== Writer (selected) ===
- Dear, Dearest, Beloved, Unique... (Милый, дорогой, любимый, единственный) (1984)
- Pants (Штаны) (1988)
- Migrants (Мигранты) (1991)
- Crusader (Крестоносец) (1995)
- Who If Not Us (Кто, если не мы) (1998)
