= Day by Day (Soviet TV series) =

Soviet television series (1971-1972)

- Directed by: Vsevolod Shilovsky
- Written by: Mikhail Ancharov
- Starring: Vyacheslav Nevinny; Nina Sazonova; Alexey Gribov; Yuri Gorobets; Nina Popova
- Cinematography: Vladislav Yefimov; Oleg Bogdanov; Boris Kiparisov
- Music by: Ilya Katayev
- Production company: Soviet Central Television
- Release date: December 9, 1971
- Running time: 1145 minutes
- Country: Soviet Union
- Language: Russian

Day by Day (Russian: День за днём, romanized: Den' za dnyom) is a Soviet drama television series directed by Vsevolod Shilovsky and written by Mikhail Ancharov. It ran for seventeen episodes from 1971 to 1972. It was the first dramatic television series filmed by Soviet Central Television.

== Plot ==
The series revolves around the residents of a large communal apartment, who belong to different families, in particular, the Yakushevs and Banykins. Neighbors become almost relatives, and their fate is closely intertwined. The old house is going to be scrapped, and all neighbors will have to be resettled in different apartments.

== Cast ==
- Vyacheslav Nevinny as Viktor Banykin
- Nina Sazonova as aunt Pasha
- Alexey Gribov as uncle Yura
- Yuri Gorobets as Konstantin Yakushev, painter
- Nina Popova as Zhenya Yakusheva
- Alexey Borzunov as Tolich
- Yevgeni Lazarev as Boris
- Alexey Eybozhenko as Sedoy
- Ksenia Minina as Ksenia
- Valentin Nikulin as Dima
- Igor Okhlupin as Pakhomov
- Kira Golovko as Kira Nikolaevna, Tolich's mother
- Angelina Stepanova as Sokolova
- Yevgeniya Khanayeva as Antonina Mikhalyova
- Nadezhda Fedosova as Anastasia Nikolaevna
- Vsevolod Shilovsky as Zhora
- Dzidra Ritenberga as Dzidra Arturovna
- Anastasia Zuyeva as old nurse
- Vitali Konyayev as Igor
- Afanasy Kochetkov as Afanasy Muravyov
- Mark Prudkin as Bogdanov
- Vladimir Grammatikov as filmmaker
- Valeriya Zaklunna
- Vitali Bezrukov

== Soundtrack ==
- Valentin Nikulin – Song of the Circus, On the Relativity of Age, Aelita
- Valentina Tolkunova – Vocalise, Drip-drip, At Night I Walked Down the Street, Sound of Footsteps, Forgive Me, Tree, Vocalise Intermedia
- Vladimir Troshin – Sip Water, In the German Far Side
- Vladimir Makarov – Comrade, Memories of Moscow
- Yuri Gorobets – I Dreamed of Raw Rattle
- Nina Sazonova – I Stand on the Train Station
- Lev Leshchenko – She was All Right
