= Yuri Klepikov =

Russian screenwriter (1935–2021)

- Born: 24 August 1935; Chelyabinsk, Russian SFSR, Soviet Union
- Died: 1 November 2021 (aged 86); Saint Petersburg, Russia
- Occupations: Screenwriter, actor
- Years active: 1966–2021

Yuri Nikolaevich Klepikov (Russian: Юpий Никoлаeвич Клeпикoв; 24 August 1935 – 1 November 2021) was a Russian screenwriter and actor. He had written for twelve films since 1966. He was a member of the jury at the 41st Berlin International Film Festival.

== Selected filmography ==
=== Scriptwriter ===
- The Story of Asya Klyachina (1966)
- The Seventh Companion (1967)
- Mama Married (1969)
- About Love (1970)
- Dauria (1971)
- The Ascent (1976)
- Boys (1983)

=== Actor ===
- Nachalo (1970) as Fyodor Vasilievich Ignatyev, chief director
- The Romanovs: An Imperial Family (2000) as General Lavr Kornilov
