= The Straw Hat =

- Written by: Leonid Kvinikhidze
- Directed by: Leonid Kvinikhidze
- Starring: Andrei Mironov; Vladislav Strzhelchik; Zinovy Gerdt; Yefim Kopelyan; Lyudmila Gurchenko
- Music by: Isaac Schwartz
- Country of origin: Soviet Union
- Original language: Russian

Production
- Cinematography: Yevgeni Shapiro
- Editor: Aleksandra Borovskaya
- Running time: 127 minutes
- Production company: Lenfilm

Original release
- Release: 1974 – 1974

The Straw Hat (Russian: Соломенная шляпка, translit. Solomennaya shlyapka) is a 1974 Soviet musical comedy television film directed by Leonid Kvinikhidze based on a play by Eugène Marin Labiche and Marc-Michel. The film's music was composed by Isaac Schwartz.

The film tells of the extravagant life of a charming rentier who thinks nothing of consequences, but living on credit finally wakes him up, forcing to end his bachelor's life by marrying the daughter of a wealthy earl for her money. All goes well until a horse eats a certain straw hat, triggering a series of farcical events interwoven with the marriage.

== Plot ==
Charming playboy and libertine Leonidas Fadinard plans a calculated marriage to the daughter of a wealthy provincial gardener, Nonancourt. As the wedding procession makes its way, the groom hurries ahead to his home for last-minute preparations. Along the way, he stops briefly, during which his horse eats the straw hat of Madame Beauperthuis, a married woman having a clandestine rendezvous with her military lover in the woods. Faced with the threat of exposure to her jealous husband, Madame and her lover storm into Fadinard’s home, occupy the bridal suite, and refuse to leave until he replaces the hat with an identical one.

Pressed by his provincial in-laws to proceed with the wedding, Fadinard scrambles to resolve the predicament. The seemingly ordinary hat turns out to be rare and difficult to replace. His first stop is a hat shop owned by a widow he had romanced and abandoned months earlier. Despite her bitterness, she directs him to a baroness who owns a similar hat.

Arriving at the baroness’s home, Fadinard is mistaken for an expected Italian tenor. He secures the hat as payment for his supposed performance, only to discover it’s the wrong one. The real tenor soon arrives, sparking chaos, and Fadinard learns the sought-after hat was gifted to the baroness’s godmother. Pursued by the increasingly confused wedding procession, he rushes to retrieve it.

As night falls, Fadinard discovers the hat's owner and Madame Beauperthuis are the same person, still at his house. Confiding in her husband, Fadinard triggers a dramatic confrontation when the man, armed with pistols, heads to Fadinard’s home. Meanwhile, the frustrated wedding party, having spent the day following Fadinard’s chaotic search, loses patience, declares the wedding void, and reclaims their gifts.

In a twist, one of the unwrapped presents reveals a straw hat identical to the original. Fadinard hands it to Madame Beauperthuis, who convinces her husband of her innocence. With the truth finally out, the bride’s family forgives Fadinard, and the wedding is back on track.

== Cast ==
- Andrei Mironov - Leonidas Fadinard
- Vladislav Strzhelchik - Antoine Nonancourt
- Zinovy Gerdt - Tardiveau
- Yefim Kopelyan - Beauperthuis
- Lyudmila Gurchenko - Bocardon
- Yekaterina Vasilyeva - Anaïs Beaupertuis
- Alisa Freindlich - La baronne de Champigny
- Mikhail Kozakov - Achille de Rosalba
- Igor Kvasha - Émile Tavernier
- Aleksandr Benyaminov - Vezinet
- Vladimir Tatosov - Félix
- Irina Maguto - Virginie
- Marina Starykh - Hélène
- Sergey Migitsko - Bobin
- Mikhail Boyarsky - Ninardi
- Yevgenia Vetlova - minstrel
- Alexander Kolpashnikov - minstrel

== Production ==
The idea of the film appeared to Leonid Kvinikhidze immediately after the filming of the film "Failure of Engineer Garin". Initially, Oleg Borisov was considered for the main role, but he needed urgent treatment, and Andrei Mironov received the role (Lyudmila Gurchenko later recalled: "We gathered to frame the brilliant Andrew, and we did it"). Nonna Terentyeva was originally invited to play the role of Clara, but Gurchenko turned out to be more convincing at the auditions. In the episodic role of a simple lamplighter, the playwright Mikhail Roshchin appears, who then had an affair with Ekaterina Vasilyeva, who starred in the film. Alisa Freindlich, known to the audience only for her dramatic roles, appeared in the cinema for the first time in a comedic image. Andrey Mironov learned to stay in the saddle right during the filming.

The film became the first notable role for Mikhail Boyarsky: "The tenacious eye of the directors figured me out as a certain artist "young, like an Italian." I was hairy, somewhat like an Italian, and in general I didn't spoil the picture." The actor spoke highly of Alisa Freindlich, who helped him with valuable advices: "Behind her fan, you could hide any aspiring artist".

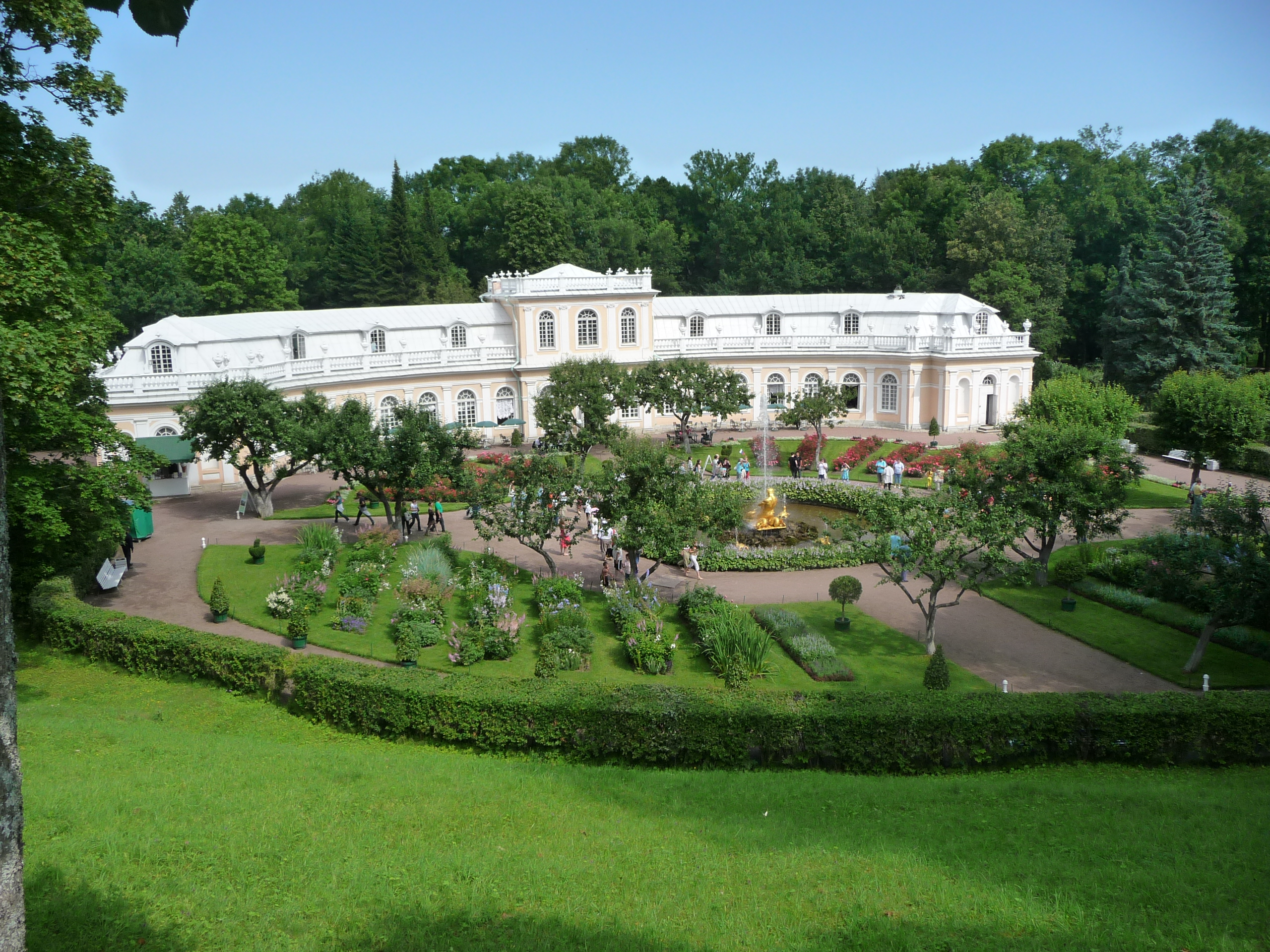
Grand Orangery, Peterhof

There was a relaxed atmosphere on the set: the actors acted out each other, indulged in small playful escapades. Kvinikhidze, who appreciated improvisations, ordered not to turn off the camera, no matter what happened. As a result, the film included a lot of episodes that were not in the script — for example, scenes when a wig falls off the Mikhail Kozakov's character during a duel, or when Mironov kisses Freindlich in the presence of Boyarsky. Kozakov approached the image of the Vicomte de Rosalba with a certain freedom, creating the image of a dandy with an uncertain sexual orientation; hearing the actor's remark about "a meadow with cows and a shepherd boy", Mironov laughed: "You're crazy! They'll ban everything to hell!", but the scene was included in the film. Alexander Beniaminov (Vezinet) could not remember the author's text and constantly improvised.

Filming was conducted in Tartu and in St. Petersburg.

== Soundtrack ==
Исаак Шварц. Песни из фильма «Соломенная шляпка»

Soundtrack album by VA
- Released: May 23, 2021
- Length: 29:00
- Label: Bomba-Piter

Songs from the film were included in various albums and compilations. In 2009, almost all songs were included in Isaac Schwartz' compilation Песни из кинофильмов

In 2021, an official soundtrack was released by Bomba-Piter. However, it excluded the most famous song - "Женюсь, женюсь" ("I'm Getting Married, I'm getting Married") performed by Andrei Mironov.

All lyrics are written by Bulat Okudzhava; all music is composed by Isaac Schwartz.

No.	Title	Artist	Length
1.	"Песенка менестрелей" (A minstrel song)	Alexander Kolpashnikov, Yevgenia Vetlova	2:31
2.	"Песенка отставного мушкетёра" (The song of a retired Musketeer)	Vladimir Tatosov	2:03
3.	"Воспоминания о Фадинаре" (Memories of Fadinar)	Alexander Kolpashnikov, Yevgenia Vetlova	2:15
4.	"Песенка о несостоявшихся надеждах" (A song about failed hopes)	Lyudmila Gurchenko, Zinovy Gerdt	3:22
5.	"Песенка парижского официанта" (The song of the Parisian waiter)	Alexander Kolpashnikov, Yevgenia Vetlova	2:35
6.	"Песенка о провинциальном городке" (A song about a provincial town)	Zinovy Gerdt	4:45
7.	"Романс" (Romance)	Alisa Freindlich, Mikhail Kozakov	1:42
8.	"Марш национальных гвардейцев" (March of the National Guardsmen)	Zinovy Gerdt	2:46
9.	"Песенка ревнивого и обманутого мужа" (The song of a jealous and deceived husband)	Yefim Kopelyan	3:58
10.	"Песенка влюблённых" (A lovers' song)	Alexander Kolpashnikov, Yevgenia Vetlova	3:03
Total length:			29:00

See Songkino.ru for the text of the songs (in Russian)
