= Sergei Makovetsky =

Soviet and Russian actor

- Сергей Маковецкий
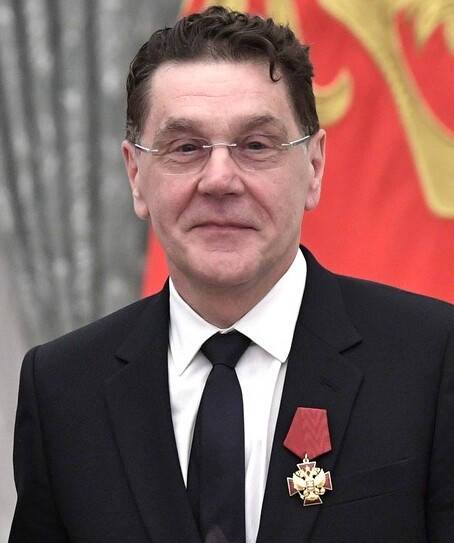
- Makovetsky in 2019
- Born: Sergei Vasilievich Makovetsky; 13 June 1958 (age 68); Kiev, Ukrainian SSR, Soviet Union
- Citizenship: Soviet Union; Russia
- Occupation: Actor
- Years active: 1980–present
- Sergei Makovetsky's voice Makovetsky on the Echo of Moscow program, 9 April 2005

Sergei Vasilievich Makovetsky (Russian: Серге́й Васи́льевич Макове́цкий, born 13 June 1958) is a Soviet and Ukrainian-born Russian film and stage actor.

His work as an actor has won him 11 awards and a further 15 nominations.

== Selected filmography ==
=== Film ===
- 1989: The Initiated as Lyokha
- 1990: Mother as gendarme Ryleev
- 1991: Sons of Bitches as Borya Sinyukhaev
- 1992: A Chasm as Vanya's Friend
- 1993: Makarov as Aleksandr Sergeyevich Makarov
- 1994: Trotsky as Lev Sedov
- 1995: A Play for a Passenger as Oleg
- 1995: The Black Veil as Pyotr Dmitrievich Sinev, the investigator
- 1996: Operation Happy New Year as patient
- 1997: Three Stories as Tikhomirov
- 1998: Retro Threesome as Sergey Kukushkin
- 1998: Composition for Victory Day as Chichevikin
- 1998: Of Freaks and Men as Johann Kehl
- 2000: Brother 2 as Valentin Belkin
- 2000: The Captain's Daughter as Alexey Shvabrin
- 2001: Mechanical Suite as Plyuganovskiy
- 2003: Key from the Bedroom as Ivanitsky
- 2004: 72 Meters as Chernenko
- 2005: Dead Man's Bluff as Koron
- 2006: It Doesn't Hurt Me as doctor
- 2007: Gloss as episode
- 2007: Duska as Duska
- 2007: Temptation as artist Igor Vasilievich
- 2007: The Russian Game as Hvoshnev
- 2007: 12 as 1st Juror
- 2008: Live and Remember as Mikheich
- 2009: The Priest as Father Alexander
- 2009: The Miracle as Kondrashov
- 2010: Burnt by the Sun 2: Exodus as SMERSH Captain Lunin
- 2011: Burnt by the Sun 3: The Citadel as SMERSH Captain Lunin
- 2012: The Girl and Death as Dr Nikolai Borodinsky
- 2022: Pravednik as Ruvim Yankel
- 2022: Layer as Yevgeny Sergeevich
- 2025: Volchok as Konstantin Tarasov
- 2027: Dead Mountaineer's Inn as Alek Snevar

=== Series ===
- 1988: The Life of Klim Samgin as Dmitri Samgin
- 2002: Failure Poirot (The Murder of Roger Ackroyd) as James Sheppard
- 2005: The Fall of the Empire as Professor of Law, and then the captain of the Army Intelligence Nesterovsky
- 2007: Liquidation as Fima the Half-Yid
- 2011: Peter the Great: The Testament as Prince Alexander Danilovich Menshikov
- 2012: Life and Fate as Shtrum
- 2015: And Quiet Flows the Don as Pantelei Prokofievich Melekhov
- 2015: Rodina as Colonel Mikhail Volskiy, Anna's boss
- 2018: Godunov as Ivan IV the Terrible
- 2020: Zuleikha Opens Her Eyes as Professor Wolf Karlovich Leibe
- 2020: The Terrible as Ivan IV the Terrible
- 2020: Wolf as Soviet ambassador to the U.S. Konstantin Umansky
- 2023: Operation Neman as Colonel Solomatin
- 2023: The Bodyguards as Alexander Akropovich
- 2025: Dear Willy as Leonid Brezhnev

=== Voice roles ===
- 2004: Alyosha Popovich and Tugarin Zmey as Grand Prince of Kiev
- 2006: Dobrinya and the Dragon as Grand Prince of Kiev
- 2007: Ilya of Murom and Nightingale the Robber as Grand Prince of Kiev
- 2007: Cargo 200 as Professor Artyom Kazakov
- 2010: The Three Bogatyrs: How Not to Rescue a Princess as Grand Prince of Kiev
- 2010: Alice in Wonderland as White Rabbit (Michael Sheen)
- 2012: The Three Bogatyrs on Distant Shores as Grand Prince of Kiev
- 2015: The Three Bogatyrs: Horse Course as Grand Prince of Kiev
- 2016: The Three Bogatyrs and the Sea King as Grand Prince of Kiev
- 2016: Alice Through the Looking Glass as White Rabbit (Michael Sheen)
- 2017: The Three Bogatyrs and the Princess of Egypt as Grand Prince of Kiev
- 2018: The Three Bogatyrs and the Heir to the Throne as Grand Prince of Kiev
- 2020: Horse Julius and Big Horse Racing as Grand Prince of Kiev
- 2021: The Three Bogatyrs and Horse Julius on the Throne as Grand Prince of Kiev
- 2023: The Three Bogatyrs and the Navel of the World as Grand Prince of Kiev
