= Sergey Obraztsov =

Soviet and Russian puppeteer

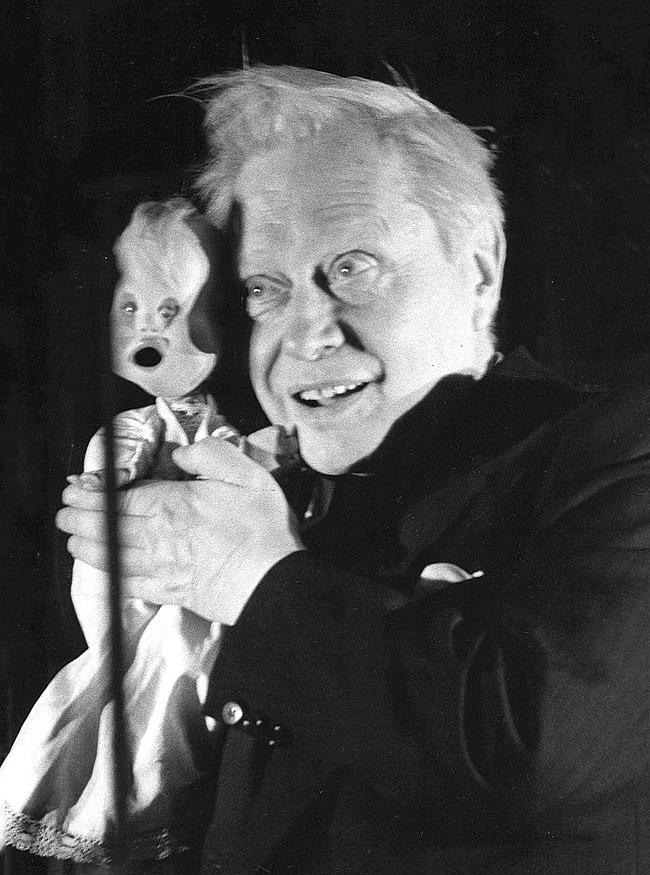
Sergey Obraztsov performing in Milan in 1973.

Sergey Vladimirovich Obraztsov (Russian: Серге́й Влади́мирович Образцо́в, 5 July 1901 – 8 May 1992) was a Soviet and Russian puppeteer who is credited by the Encyclopædia Britannica with "establishing puppetry as an art form in the Soviet Union." Puppet theaters in many countries owe their establishment to Obraztsov's influence. His collection of exotic puppets was the largest in Russia and one of the largest in the world.

Obraztsov was born on 22 June 1901 in Moscow into the family of a schoolteacher and a railroad engineer. Between 1922 and 1931, he worked as an actor with Vladimir Nemirovich-Danchenko in one of the studios of the Moscow Art Theatre. During this period, he staged several vaudeville-style puppet shows before going on to set up the State Central Puppet Theatre in Moscow in 1931.

His theatre toured more than 350 cities in the USSR and 90 cities in foreign countries. During his numerous tours abroad, Obraztsov helped to popularize artistic puppetry in the United States, Britain, and other countries. One of his best known shows, An Unusual Concert (1946), satirized bad performers. Besides more than 70 plays for children and grown-ups that he staged in his theatre, Obraztsov also directed the first short-length puppet film under the title Looking at a Polar Sunset Ray in 1938, and also a number of documentaries. In his later years, Obraztsov became enthusiastic about finger puppets. He was also skilled in puppeteering with his bare hands.

Sergey Obraztsov was the president of the International Union of Puppeteers (1976–1984, and from 1984 the president emeritus), a teaching professor of the Russian Academy of Theatre Arts (from 1973), and a member of the Writers’ Union of the USSR. Obraztsov authored an autobiography and a monograph on Chinese puppet theatre. He was awarded the Stalin Prize in 1946, named People's Artist of the USSR in 1952, and a Hero of Socialist Labour in 1971. Obraztsov died on 8 May 1992 and was buried in the Novodevichy Cemetery.

The Obraztsov Foundation, established in 1998 by his family members and the Obraztsov Puppet Theatre, was aimed at preserving his rich creative legacy.

In September 2001, the Sergey Obraztsov Theatre (Moscow State Puppet Theatre named after Obraztsov) hosted a week-long centennial celebration which included an international array of performers.

== Books written ==
- My Profession (1950) Foreign Languages, Moscow. Translated from the Russian by Ralph Parker and Valentina Scott. Contains many sepia plates of puppets plus a biography of Sergey Obraztsov.
- IMPRESSIONS OF LONDON: On What I Saw, Learned and Understood During Two Visits to London (1957) Sidgwick & Jackson, London
- The Chinese Puppet Theatre (1961) Faber & Faber Limited, UK.
