= Dinara Asanova =

Soviet film director (1942–1985)

- Динара Асанова
- Born: 24 October 1942; Frunze, Kirgiz Republic, Soviet Union (now Bishkek, Kyrgyzstan)
- Died: 4 April 1985 (aged 42); Murmansk, Soviet Union
- Occupations: Film director, actress
- Years active: 1969–1985

Dinara Kuldashevna Asanova (Russian: Дина́ра Кулда́шевна Аса́нова; 24 October 1942 – 4 April 1985) was a Kyrgyzstani-Soviet film director and one of the most notable and acclaimed female filmmakers of the late Soviet Union. She is best known for her films Woodpeckers Don't Get Headaches (1975) and Tough Kids or Boys (Patsany) (1983). Although she was not very well known in the West, Asanova was popular in the USSR. Her career spans over 25 years, ending with her death at the age of 42 due to a heart ailment. Between the years 1969 and 1984, Asanova made ten films. Her films often dealt with the subject of troubled adolescence and incorporated critiques on Soviet society. Asanova rarely had problems with the censors despite the fact that her films featured such themes.

== Career ==
Dinara Asanova was born in Bishkek (formally Frunze), Kyrgyzstan, on 24 October 1942. After graduating high school in 1959, Asanova began her film career as an assistant director, cutter and actress at the Kyrgyzfilm studio from 1960-1962. During her time at the studio, she worked with Larisa Shepitko on her 1963 film Heat (Znoi). Asanova then began studying at the Gerasimov Institute of Cinematography or VGIK, a Soviet state film school in Moscow. She studied alongside Mikhail Romm and Aleksandr Stolper, two other famous Soviet directors. For Asanova’s graduation project, she made her first film Rudolfio (1970) Asanova graduated from the university in 1969 and later moved to Leningrad in 1974 to begin working at the Lenfilm Studio. At the studio, Asanova made her first feature film The Woodpecker Doesn’t Get Headaches (1975) which helped establish her position in Soviet Cinema. Asanova would go on to make 8 other films with the studio. Boys (1983) was her most famous work and biggest box office hit - for the film she received the USSR State Film Prize. She died on 4 April 1985 in Murmansk, Soviet Union, from a heart ailment at the age of 42.

== Filmography ==
- Rudolfio (Russian: Рудольфио) (1970)
- The Woodpecker Doesn't Get Headaches (Не болит голова у дятла) (1975)
- The Key That Should Not Be Handed On (Ключ без права передачи) (1976)
- Trouble (1977)
- The Wife has left (Жена ушла) (1979)
- The Useless Girl (Никудышняя) (1980)
- What Did You Chose? (Что бы ты выбрал?) (1981)
- Boys (Пацаны) (1983)
- Dear, Dearest, Beloved, Unique... (Милый, дорогой, любимый, единственный) (1984)
- Children of Discord (Дети раздоров) (1984)

=== Rudolfio (1970) ===
Dinara Asanova’s first film was Rudolfio. The film is an adaption of the 1965 novel Rudolfio by Valentin Rasputin. The main topics of the film are adolescence, young female sexuality, shame and the age of consent. It is about a ninth grade girl named Io who falls in love with Rudolfio, an older married man. Although the film focuses on the topic of female sexuality, many parts of the book that illustrate Io’s sexuality and her lust for Rudolfio were not incorporated to avoid issues with the censors. During the era of the Soviet Union, films were looked at rigorously by Soviet censors to ensure that films’ subject matter fit with Soviet convictions. After the film was analyzed by the censors, it had to be remade before its official release. Several scenes were removed such as a scene of Io and Rodolfio walking by the sea together. The censors wanted to ensure the message that Io and Rudolfio could not be together was clear. Due to troubles with censors, Asanova was not able to obtain a directorial job for five years. Her period away from film-making ended when she started working for Lenfilm.

=== The Woodpecker Doesn’t Get Headaches (1975) ===
Woodpeckers Don't Get Headaches (Ne bolit golova u dyatla) was Dinara Asanova’s first feature film. It was the first film she made when she began working at Lenfilm Studio in Leningrad and it resulted in her gaining a name for herself in Soviet Cinema. It also established the style and common narrative themes depicted in all of Asanova’s films. The Woodpecker Doesn’t Get Headaches depicts a young aspiring drummer who falls in love with a girl during a summer holiday. It is about the difficulties of first love and life long choices of youngsters.

=== Tough Kids or Boys (1983) ===
Boys (Patsany) was Dinara’s Asanova’s most commercially successful film. It was made near the end of her career while she worked at Lenfilm Studio and continued the trend of troubled adolescence as the main subject of Asanova’s films. It is about a graduate student who mentors and befriends a group of delinquent and criminal boys at a camp. The film was highly acclaimed upon its release and it won Asanova a USSR State Prize.

== Film form ==
=== Narrative ===
Dinara Asanova’s films often depict people’s and youths’ struggles in everyday life. Her most notable films such as Rudolfio, The Woodpecker Doesn’t Get Headaches and Tough Kids deal with troubled adolescence and the difficult shift from childhood to adulthood. They also focus on personal issues, the difficulties of Soviet life and questions related to the human predicament. Asanova is considered a member of the “Leningrad School” of filmmakers. This was a group of filmmakers known for their similar film form. The other key members were Vitaly Melnikov, Alexei German, Gleb Panfilov and Ilya Averbahk. Their films were characterized as realistic, ambiguous and incorporated critiques on everyday and Soviet society.

=== Style ===
Dinara Asanova’s film style can be described as realistic, documentary style and an unadorned portrayal of the world. She incorporated realism within her work to contribute to her films’ narratives which often focused on the individual and a realistic portrayal of common life. Asanova is known for incorporating improvisation in her films in the form of dialogue and plot to add to her films’ gritty and realistic feel. Also, Asanova mixed both known and unknown actors in her films. The young actors were often unknown and featured for the first time.

=== Khrushchev's thaw on Asanova’s film form ===
The form of Dinara Asanova’s films and the films of the other directors within the “Leningrad School” represent the changing views and use of the arts during the years of the Soviet Union known as Khrushchev’s Thaw. The Thaw took place during Khrushchev’s presidential term in the 50s and 60s. It was a period of change from Stalin’s cultural politics and strict censorship to allowing writers, artists and filmmakers to criticize Soviet social problems and focus on individual experiences rather than only the collective. The effects of the Thaw continued during the later part of the Soviet Union era after Khrushchev's term ended. Asanova is a prominent filmmaker that represents the artists during this period. She was often outspoken on her critiques of Soviet society, particularly on issues of sexuality, gender and everyday Soviet life. These critiques can be found in all her films and are often depicted through her young and teenage characters. Although censorship was not as stringent during and after the period of the Thaw, Asanova was strategic at depicting these critiques in her films as to avoid them from being shelved.

== Legacy ==
Dinara Asanova remains as a significant female filmmaker from the late Soviet Union. Despite her early death at age 42, she created several films that contributed to shaping late Soviet Cinema. She was rewarded with the USSR State Prize for her work on Tough Kids and was named Merited Artist of The Russian Federation in 1980, Bishkek, Kyrgyzstan. Asanova's film Dear, Dearest, Beloved, Unique... was screened in the Un Certain Regard section at the 1985 Cannes Film Festival. Three documentaries were made about her after she died, the first being I Love You All Very Much (1987), the second being Dinara (1988) and the third being Dinara Asanova (2003).
