= Aleksandr Proshkin =

Russian film director

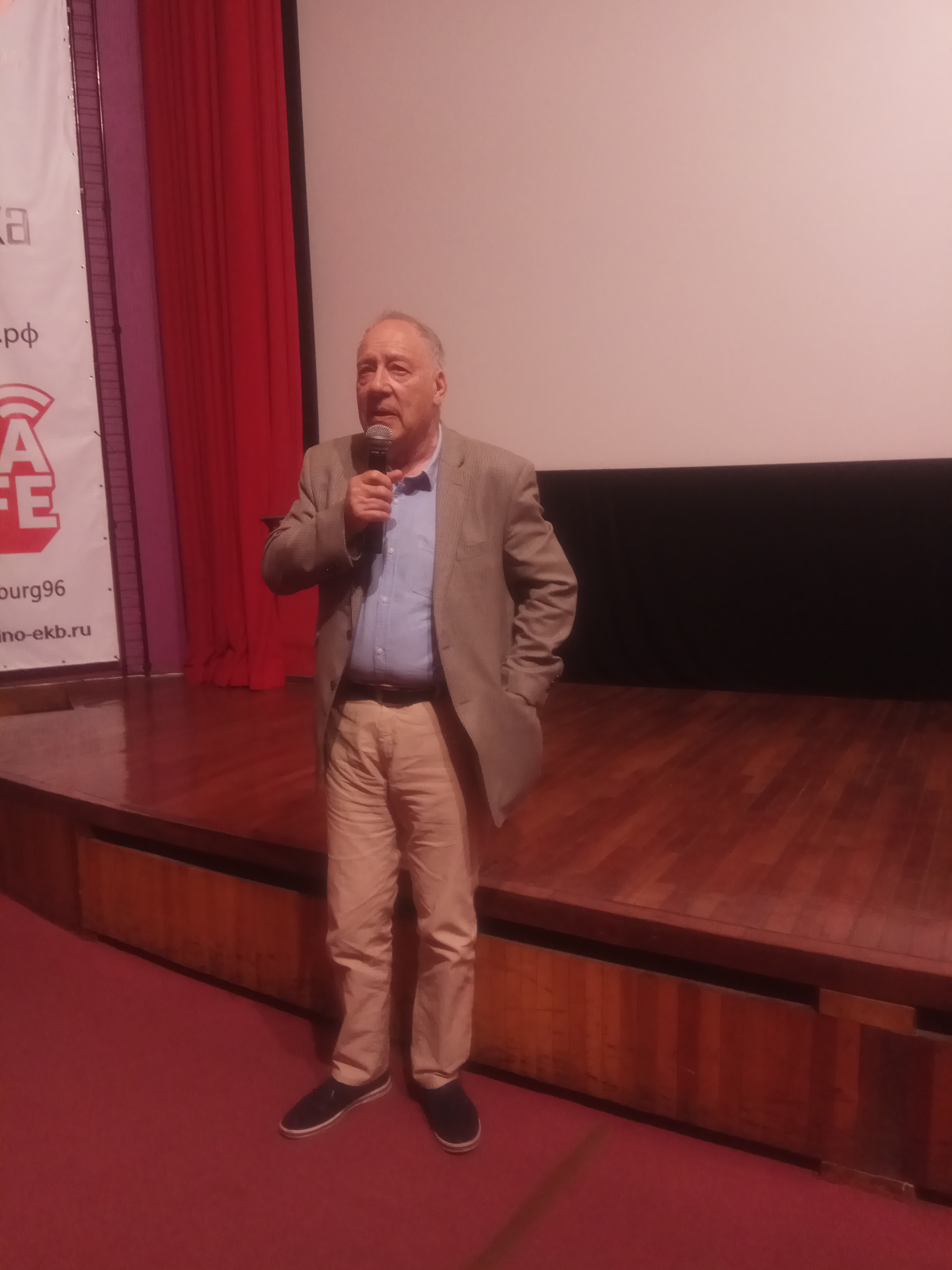
- Born: 25 March 1940 (age 86); Leningrad, Russian SFSR, USSR (now St. Petersburg, Russia)
- Occupations: Film director, screenwriter
- Years active: 1975-present

Aleksandr Anatolyevich Proshkin (Russian: Алeксандр Анатольевич Прошкин; born 25 March 1940) is a Russian film director and screenwriter. He has directed fourteen films since 1975. His 2009 film The Miracle was entered into the 31st Moscow International Film Festival.

== Selected filmography ==
- Cold Summer of 1953 (Холодное лето пятьдесят третьего, 1987)
- Nikolai Vavilov (Николай Вавилов, 1990)
- The Black Veil (Чёрная вуаль, 1995)
- The Captain's Daughter (Русский бунт, 2000)
- Live and Remember (Живи и помни, 2008)
- The Miracle (Чудо, 2009)
- Dr. Zhivago (2006 film) Доктор Живаго https://www.lavanguardia.com/peliculas-series/peliculas/movie-352368
