= Time for Sorrow Hasn't Come Yet =

- Russian: Время печали ещё не пришло
- Directed by: Sergey Selyanov
- Written by: Mikhail Konovalchuk; Sergey Selyanov
- Produced by: Sergey Selyanov
- Starring: Valeriy Priyomykhov; Pyotr Mamonov; Marina Levtova; Mikhail Svetin; Sergei Parshin
- Cinematography: Denis Shchiglovsky
- Edited by: Olga Amosova
- Music by: Vladimir Radchenkov
- Release date: 1995
- Country: Russia
- Language: Russian

Time for Sorrow Hasn't Come Yet (Russian: Время печали ещё не пришло, romanized: Vremya pechali eshchë ne prishlo) is a 1995 Russian drama film directed by Sergey Selyanov.

== Plot ==
The film takes place in one settlement, in which a person suddenly appears and calls himself a Surveyor, after which the inhabitants of the village suddenly disperse, and on the eve of the era of Aquarius gather again.

== Cast ==
- Valeriy Priyomykhov as Ivanov
- Pyotr Mamonov as Mefodi
- Marina Levtova as Lyalya / Sonya
- Mikhail Svetin as Zhibbayev
- Sergei Parshin as Grinya
- Semyon Strugachyov as Shmukler
- Juris Strenga as Vilman
- Viktor Dement as Yashka
- Pyotr Vasilyev as Ivanov as child (as Petya Vasilyev)
- Tatyana Zhuravlyova as Shepotukha
