= Aleksandr Avdeyev (pilot) =

Soviet fighter ace

Alexander Fyodorovich Avdeyev
- Александр Фёдорович Авдеев
- Born: 5 August 1916; Bolshaya Talinka, Tambov Governorate
- Died: 12 August 1942 (aged 26); Novaya Usman, USSR
- Military career
- Allegiance: Soviet Union
- Branch: Soviet Air Force
- Service years: 1938 – 1942
- Rank: Captain
- Conflicts: World War II; Winter War; Eastern Front †
- Awards: Hero of the Soviet Union; Order of Lenin; Order of the Red Star

Aleksandr Fyodorovich Avdeyev (Russian: Александр Фёдорович Авдеев; 5 August 1916 – 12 August 1942) was a Soviet fighter ace of World War II with 13 victories claimed. He participated in the Soviet-Finnish War of 1939–1940 (Winter War). He was awarded the title of Hero of the Soviet Union on 10 February 1943.

== Early life ==
He was born in the village of Bolshaya Talinka in Tambov Governorate. In the 1930s his family had to move to Lyublino (now a district of Moscow). There he has graduated from factory-and-workshop school and worked as a metalworker in a foundry. After work he attended an Air club in Podolsk. In 1938 he joined the army and attended the Borisoglebsk Military Air College.

== World War II ==
From the beginning of the German-Soviet War he served on the Leningrad Front with 153 IAP as a Leytenant and was later promoted to Starshiy Leytenant and Flight commander. In 1941 he claimed 7 victories in 189 missions. Piloting a Polikarpov I-153 biplane, he shot down a future high-scoring German ace Lt. Walter Nowotny of JG 54 over Saaremaa on 19 July 1941 in Bf 109 E-7 (W.Nr. 1137) "White 2" over Riga Bay. In that fight Avdeyev's plane was also shot down and he subsequently spent a month in hospital due to injuries sustained during the crash.

In August 1942 he served as a P-39 Airacobra pilot on the Voronezh Front. On 12 August 1942 he was the first Airacobra pilot who used a ramming attack to down an opponent. His victim was possibly Fw. Franz Schulte of 6./JG 77, an ace with 46 victories. Both pilots were later buried in Novaya Usman, a village near Voronezh.

Avdeyev was awarded the Order of Lenin, the Order of the Red Banner, the Order of the Red Star.
