= Yuri Avdeyev =

Russian politician (born 1952)

- Юрий Авдеев

Member of the Legislative Assembly of Saint Petersburg from the 23rd district
- Incumbent
- Assumed office 28 September 2016

Personal details
- Born: 11 April 1952 (age 74) Leningrad, Russian SFSR, USSR
- Party: United Russia
- Education: Lesgaft National State University of Physical Education, Sport and Health
- Profession: Politician

Yuri Vasilyevich Avdeyev (Russian: Юрий Васильевич Авдеев; born 11 April 1952) is a Russian politician who currently serves as a member of the Legislative Assembly of Saint Petersburg since 28 September 2016.
