= Yekaterina Vasilyeva =

Soviet and Russian actress (born 1945)

- Born: Yekaterina Sergeyevna Vasilyeva; August 15, 1945 (age 81); Moscow, RSFSR, USSR
- Occupation: Actress
- Years active: 1965 – present
- Awards: Order of Honour (Russia) – 2010; People’s Artist of the RSFSR – 1987; Honored Artist of the RSFSR – 1981

Yekaterina Sergeyevna Vasilyeva (Russian: Екатерина Серге́евна Васильева; born 15 August 1945 in Moscow) is a Soviet and Russian theater and film actress. She performed in more than ninety films since 1967.

Vasilyeva was married to the late director Sergei Solovyov and playwright Mikhail Roshchin.

== Selected filmography ==
- 1965 They're Calling, Open the Door (Звонят, откройте дверь) as Physical education teacher
- 1967 The Journalist as an employee of the department of letters
- 1971 Bumbarash (Бумбараш) as Sofia Nikolaevna Tulchinskaya
- 1973 This Merry Planet (Эта весёлая планета) as Z
- 1974 The Straw Hat (Соломенная шляпка) as Madame Anais Bopertyui, hostess hats
- 1978 An Ordinary Miracle (Обыкновенное чудо) as Emilia
- 1980 Air Crew (Экипаж) as Timchenko’s wife
- 1980 Do Not Part with Your Beloved (С любимыми не расставайтесь) as Nikulina
- 1981 The Vacancy (Вакансия)
- 1982 Charodei (Чародеи) as Kira Anatolyevna Shemahanskaya
- 1998 Who If Not Us (Кто, если не мы) as mother at the parents' meeting
- 2000 Come Look at Me (Приходи на меня посмотреть) as Sophia Ivanovna
- 2009 Black Lightning (Чёрная молния) as Olga Andreevna Romantseva, academic
- 2012 Anna German. Mystery of White Angel (Анна Герман. Тайна белого ангела) as Anna Frizen
- 2012 Atomic Ivan ( Атомный Иван) as Ivan's grandmother
