= List of Russian films of 2006 =

A list of films produced in Russia in 2006 (see 2006 in film).

== 2006 ==
Title	Russian title	Director	Cast	Genre	Notes
977	Девять семь семь	Nikolay Khomeriki	Fyodor Lavrov, Klavdiya Korshunova	Drama	Screened at the 2006 Cannes Film Festival
Above the Lake	Надъ озеромъ	Dmitrii Frolov	Peter Kremis	Science fiction	
Alive	Живой	Aleksandr Veledinsky	Andrei Chadov	Drama	
Bastards	Сволочи	Aleksandr Atanesyan	Andrey Panin, Andrey Krasko	War drama	
Bramble, During the Summer	Костяника. Время лета	Dmitry Fyodorov	Olga Starchenkova	Romance	
Break-through	Прорыв	Vitaliy Lukin	Ildus Abrahmanov	Drama	
Dikari	Дикари	Viktor Shamirov	Gosha Kutsenko, Vladislav Galkin, Marat Basharov	Comedy	
Day Watch	Дневной дозор	Timur Bekmambetov	Konstantin Khabensky, Aleksei Chadov, Gosha Kutsenko, Igor Lifanov, Zhanna Friske	Fantasy	Based on the book of the same name by Sergey Lukyanenko
Dobrynya Nikitich and Zmey Gorynych	Добрыня Никитич и Змей Горыныч	Ilya Maksimov	Yekaterina Gorohovskaya, Sergey Makovetskiy	Fairy tale	Animation
Euphoria	Эйфория	Ivan Vyrypaev	Polina Agureeva, Maksim Ushakov, Mikhail Okunev	Drama	
Family Name	Двойная фамилия	Stanislav Mitin	Oleg Stefan	Drama	
Franz + Polina	Franz + Polina	Mikhail Segal	Adrian Topol	War	
Free Floating	Свободное плавание	Boris Khlebnikov	Aleksandr Yatsenko	Comedy	
Graffiti	Граффити	Igor Apasyan	Andrei Novikov	Comedy	
Heat	ЖАRА	Rezo Gigineishvili	Aleksey Chadov, Artur Smolyaninov	Comedy	
The Island	Остров	Pavel Lungin	Petr Mamonov, Viktor Sukhorukov, Dmitri Dyuzhev	Drama	
It Doesn't Hurt Me	Мне не больно	Aleksey Balabanov	Renata Litvinova	Drama	
Khottabych	Хоттабыч	Peter Tochilin	Marius Jampolskis, Vladimir Tolokonnikov	Comedy	
Kiss of a Butterfly	Поцелуй бабочки	Anton Sivers	Sergey Bezrukov, Lan Yan	Crime	
Last Slaughter	Последний забой	Sergey Bobrov	Sergey Garmash	Drama	
Mayak	Маяк	Mariya Saakyan	Anna Kapaleva	Drama	
Moscow Mission	Обратный отсчёт	Vadim Shmelyov	Andrey Merzlikin	Action	
My Love	Моя любовь	Aleksandr Petrov		Romance	Animation
Nobody Knows About Sex	Никто не знает про секс	Aleksey Gordeev	Nikolay Machulsky, Aurora, Anatoly Kuznetsov	Comedy	
Piranha	Охота на пиранью	Andrey Kavun	Vladimir Mashkov, Svetlana Antonova, Yevgeny Mironov	Action	
Piter FM	Питер FM	Oksana Bychkova	Ekaterina Fedulova	Comedy	
Playing the Victim	Изображая жертву	Kirill Serebrennikov	Yuri Chursin, Vitali Khayev	Comedy	
The Power of Fear	Ведьма	Oleg Fesenko	Valery Nikolaev	Horror	
Prince Vladimir	Князь Владимир	Yuriy Kulakov	Yuri Berkun, Irina Bezrukova, Sergei Bezrukov	History, Fantasy	Animation
Pushkin: The Last Duel	Пушкин. Последняя дуэль	Natalya Bondarchuk	Sergey Bezrukov	Drama	
Rabbit Over the Void	Заяц над бездной	Tigran Keosayan	Bogdan Stupka	Comedy	
Rush Hour	Час пик	Oleg Fesenko	Konstantin Khabensky, Anna Kovalchuk, Andrey Merzlikin	Drama	
Russian Translation	Русский перевод	Alexander Chernjaev	Nikita Zverev, Sergey Veksler	Thriller	
The Sword Bearer	Меченосец	Filipp Yankovsky	Artyom Tkachenko, Chulpan Khamatova, Oleksiy Gorbunov	Action	
Transit	Перегон	Aleksandr Rogozhkin	Aleksei Serebryakov, Daniil Strakhov, Anastasiya Nemolyaeva	War drama	
U.E.	У.Е.	Aleksandr Atanesyan	Aleksandr Atanesyan, Dorie Gray	Thriller	
The Ugly Swans	Гадкие лебеди	Konstantin Lopushansky	Catherine Dussart, Gregory Hlady	Science fiction	Based on the book of the same name by Strugatskies
Wolfhound	Волкодав из рода Серых Псов	Nikolai Lebedev	Aleksandr Bukharov, Gennady Makoev	Fantasy	Based on Maria Semenova book
Worm	Червь	Aleksei Muradov	Sergey Shnyryov, Anastasiya Sapozhnikova	Drama	Entered into the 28th Moscow International Film Festival
Young Wolfhound	Молодой Волкодав	Oleg Fomin	Aleksandr Bukharov, Anna Azarova	Fantasy	TV prequel to Volkodav from the Grey Hound Clan, based on Maria Semenova books

== See also ==
- 2006 in Russia
