= Wolfhound =

Wolfhound or Wolfhounds may refer to:

== Dogs ==
- A dog bred or trained for wolf hunting with dogs

=== Specific breeds ===
- Bankhar Dog, a livestock guarding dog also known as the Mongolian wolfhound
- Borzoi, a sighthound dog breed formerly known as the Russian wolfhound
- Irish Wolfhound, a sighthound dog breed
- Saarloos wolfdog (German: Saarlooswolfhund), a wolf-dog breed

== Entertainment ==
- Wolfhound (1992 film), a Soviet action film directed by Mikhail Tumanishvili
- Wolfhound (2002 film), an American film directed by Donovan Kelly and shot in Ireland
- Wolfhound (2006 film), Russian fantasy film based on the 1995 novel
  - Wolfhound (novel), a 1995 Russian fantasy novel by Maria Semyonova
  - Young Wolfhound, a 2006–2007 television series and prequel to the 2006 film
- The Wolfhounds, an English noise pop group

== Military ==
- C-146A Wolfhound, an American variant of the Dornier 328 aircraft
- HMS Wolfhound (L56), a Royal Navy escort destroyer of World War II
- M38 Wolfhound, a 6×6 armoured car of the U.S. military
- Wolfhound (Heavy Tactical Support Vehicle), a 6×6 variant of the Cougar (MRAP)
- Wolfhounds, nickname of the 27th Infantry Regiment (United States)
- Wolfhound, a COMINT device

== Sports ==
- Boston Irish Wolfhounds, an American rugby union team.
- Ireland Wolfhounds, Ireland's "A" (second-level) national rugby union team
- Limavady GAC or Limavady Wolfhounds, a Gaelic Athletic Association club
- Wolfhounds, nickname of the Ireland national rugby league team
- Wolfhounds (rugby union), women's rugby union team in Ireland

== Other uses ==
- Wolfhound (horse) (1989–2009), a Thoroughbred racehorse
- Wolfhound, a planned enlargement of the Armstrong Siddeley Deerhound aero-engine

== See also ==
- Wolfdog, a wolf-dog hybrid
