= Let's Marry =

Let's Marry may refer to:

- Pelli Chesukundam (English: Let's Marry), a 1997 Telugu film
- Let's Get Married (TV series), a 2008 Russian dating series whose name literally translates to "Let's Marry"

== See also ==
- Let's Get Married (disambiguation)
