= The Wolfhound =

Fantasy franchise

- Author: Maria Semenova
- Country: Russia
- Language: Russian
- Genre: Fantasy
- Publisher: AST; Azbooka
- Published: 1995–2014
- No. of books: 7

The Wolfhound is a series of novels by Russian author Maria Semenova. The series consists of 7 books. The first one was published in 1995, and the last in 2014. From 2015 to the present day, Maria Semenova has been releasing The Brothers book series — a prequel to that world, set many centuries before Wolfhound, which already includes 5 volumes.

== Books in the series ==
- 1995 — Wolfhound (Volkodav)
- 1996 — Wolfhound: The Right for a Fight (Volkodav. Pravo na poedinok)
- 2000 — Wolfhound: Istovik-Stone (Volkodav. Istovik-kamen)
- 2003 — Wolfhound: Sign of the Way (Volkodav. Znamenie puti)
- 2003 — Wolfhound: Emerald Mountains (Volkodav. Samocvetnye gory)
- 2007 — Wolfhound: The Star Sword (Volkodav. Zvezdnyi mech)
- 2014 — Wolfhound: The World Along the Way (Volkodav. Mir po doroge)

If you look at the books by story timeline rather than publication order, the correct sequence would place «Istovik-Stone» first and «The World Along the Way» second.

== Plot Summary ==
The series of novels tells the story of a young warrior from the Grey Hound clan, nicknamed Wolfhound. When he was still a child, his home village was attacked. All members of the vennish Grey Hound clan were put to the sword, but the boy was left alive and sold into the mines known as the Emerald Mountains. However, Wolfhound eventually escaped the mines (the only slave to ever do so of his own free will). His ultimate goal became avenging his clan.

=== Main Characters ===
The main character of the novel series is Wolfhound. He is 23 years old at the beginning of the first novel and around 30 by the end of the series. In the first books, Wolfhound is shown as a silent barbarian who can only solve problems with physical force — while he is quite sensible, he lacks diplomacy. In the penultimate (chronological) part of the series, when fate makes him a master of the Kan-Kiro martial art in the Twin Temple Castle, he becomes quite enlightened and spends many hours in the local library. Another defining feature of Wolfhound is his deeply respectful and tender attitude toward women:

The story of Wolfhound is the story of a man who grew up under a matriarchy and, even after ending up in forced labor, clings tooth and nail to the moral concepts of his people. He does this simply not to lose himself or perish in a world foreign to him. To him, women are sacred! Could he really allow himself a fleeting fling under a bush, the kind that fantasy books are filled with?.. If you want a promiscuous hero, go read Conan. My character is different. And why shouldn't at least one character be a chaste ascetic?

— Maria Semenova

=== Setting ===
Map of the Wolfhound world

The real-world equivalent of the novels' time and setting is never explicitly mentioned anywhere. The author herself has this to say about it:

It is, of course, a different planet, though suspiciously similar to our Earth. I populated it with some different animals and handled the climatic conditions exactly how I wanted to. But overall, I didn't spend too much time thinking about which constellation to place this planet in.

— Maria Semenova

As for the ethnicities featured in the novel, Maria Semenova states that the Venn tribe can be likened to the Slavs, the Segvans to the Germanic and Norsemens, and the Velkhs to the Celts.

The world of Wolfhound has a unique topology. In addition to the «regular» surface, the earth has a «reverse side». The two surfaces are connected by pathways located in several places. The main characters used one of these pathways to escape their pursuers — an episode that concludes the first book. The «reverse side» of the earth is called Belovodye. This place is rarely described in the books. It is only mentioned that peace and harmony reign supreme in Belovodye. Because of this, upon arriving there, the characters found refuge and managed to heal the severely wounded Wolfhound. You can picture the world of Wolfhound as a double-sided sheet of paper. The «ordinary world» is on one side, and the aforementioned Belovodye is on the other. The pathways between the sides resemble holes in the sheet.

The fifth book also describes a deep natural well called Ponor, which turns out to be a pathway to the land of Velimor. According to the book, while the constellations in Belovodye do not differ from the regular ones, the starry sky in Velimor looks completely different.

However, the sci-fi elements in the Wolfhound books are barely explored. The core themes of the series are battles, psychological dilemmas, and journeys.

== Adaptations ==
- Wolfhound of The Grey Hound Clan (2006)
- Young Wolfhound (2006–2007)

Several video games were also released, including Requital.
