= Sharikov =

Sharikov (masculine), Sharikova (feminine) is a Russian-language surname. Notable people with the surname include:

- Sergey Sharikov (1974-2015), Russian fencer
- Boris Sharikov, Ukrainian general and politician, M.P.
- Nikolai Sharikov (1922-1991), Soviet military commander, Hero of the Soviet Union

== Fictional characters ==
- Poligraf Poligrafovich Sharikov, major character in the 1925 novel Heart of a Dog by Mikhail Bulgakov (and in the 1988 film with the same name)
