= Vladimir Tolokonnikov =

Soviet actor (1943–2017)

- Tolokonnikov in 2006
- Born: Vladimir Alexeyevich Tolokonnikov; June 25, 1943; Almaty, Kazakh SSR, USSR
- Died: July 15, 2017 (aged 74); Moscow, Russia
- Occupation: actor
- Years active: 1973–2017

Vladimir Alexeyevich Tolokonnikov (Russian: Влади́мир Алексе́евич Толоко́нников; June 25, 1943 – July 15, 2017) was a Soviet, Russian and Kazakh film and theater actor, Honored Artist of the Kazakh SSR. He was awarded the Russian Order of Friendship (May 5, 2009).

== Biography ==
Vladimir Tolokonnikov was born June 25, 1943. In 1973 he graduated from the acting department of Yaroslavl State Theatre Institute.

He worked at the National Academic Theatre of Russian Drama in Almaty after graduating from drama school.

Tolokonnikov became widely known after the film Heart of a Dog, directed by Vladimir Bortko and based on the novel by Mikhail Bulgakov, which appeared in 1988 as a Sharikov.

He played a starring role in director Pyotr Tochilin's Khottabych, embodying on the screen the image of an ancient genie faced with today's Internet culture. For the role Khottabych won Best Comedic Performance at the Russian MTV Movie Awards in 2007.

He died in Moscow on the night of July 15, 2017 at the age of 74. The cause of death was heart failure as a result of bronchitis complications. Buried July 20, 2017 in the 25th plot of the Troyekurovskoye Cemetery. (source ru.wikipedia.org)

== Partial filmography ==
- 1981: The Last Transition as Tolokonnikov
- 1988: Heart of a Dog (TV Movie) as Polygraph Polygraphovich Sharikov
- 1989: Koshkodav Silver as murderer
- 1990: Cloud-Paradise as Felomeev
- 1996: The Children of Captain Grant as Cave hermit
- 2006: Khottabych as Khottabych
- 2017: Naughty Grandma as Bessonov
- 2018: The Old Fogy as Mikhalych
- 2018: Super Family 2 as Pavel Grigoryevich (final film role)

== Recognition and awards ==
- Vasilyev Brothers State Prize of the RSFSR (1990) for his role Polygraph Polygraphovich Sharikov in the film Heart of a Dog (1988)
- Honored Artist of the Kazakh SSR
- Annual independent national award Club Patrons of Kazakhstan Platinum Tarlan in the category - Theater (2006)
- MTV Movie Awards in the category Best Comedic Performance for his role Khottabych (2007)
- Russian Order of Friendship (2009)
