= Dog's Heart =

1975 film

Cuore di cane Dog's Heart
- Directed by: Alberto Lattuada
- Written by: Mario Gallo
- Screenplay by: Alberto Lattuada; Viveca Melander
- Based on: Heart of a Dog by Mikhail Bulgakov
- Starring: Max von Sydow; Eleonora Giorgi; Mario Adorf
- Cinematography: Lamberto Caimi
- Edited by: Sergio Montanari
- Music by: Piero Piccioni
- Distributed by: Constantin Film
- Release dates: 23 January 1976 (Italy); 20 February 1976 (West Germany)
- Running time: 113 min
- Countries: Italy, Germany
- Language: Italian

Cuore di cane (German: Warum bellt Herr Bobikow?, International title - Dog's Heart) is a 1976 Italian-language joint Italian-German comedy film directed by Alberto Lattuada based on Russian author Mikhail Bulgakov's novel Heart of a Dog, adapted by Mario Gallo. Screenplay by Alberto Lattuada with Viveca Melander. Composer - Piero Piccioni, editor - Sergio Montanari. Cinematography by Lamberto Caimi. Production companies - Corona Filmproduktion, Filmalpha, distribution by Constantin Film. Runtime - 113 min.

== Cast ==
- Max von Sydow as Professor Filipp Filippovich Preobrazenski
- Eleonora Giorgi as Zina
- Mario Adorf as Dr. Bormenthàl
- Gina Rovere as Darja
- Cochi Ponzoni as Poligràph Poligràphovic Bobikow
- Vadim Glowna as Schwonder
- Rena Niehaus as Zoja
- Enzo Robutti as Il commissario
- Violetta Chiarini as Vjazemskaja
- Amerigo Tot as Il portiere
- Vlado Stegar
- Ilona Staller as Natasa
- Giuliano Petrelli as Sarovkjam
- Jean-Claude Vernè
- Piero Tordi
- Howard Nelson Rubien
- Samuel Lachize
- Maria Pia Attanasio as Pelageja
- Adolfo Lastretti as Il giudice
- Giancarlo Anichini
- Attilio Dottesio
- Veriano Genesi
- Neil Hansen
- Franco Mazzieri as L'oste
- Gennaro Ombra
- Alessandro Tedeschi

== See also ==
- Heart of a Dog (1988 film), Russian TV adaptation of the same novel.
