= The Life of Klim Samgin (TV series) =

- Based on: Novel by Maxim Gorky
- Written by: Viktor Titov; Alexander Lapshin
- Directed by: Viktor Titov
- Starring: Andrey Rudensky
- Music by: Nikolai Martynov
- Country of origin: Soviet Union
- Original language: Russian

Production
- Cinematography: Vladimir Ilyin
- Editor: Anna Babushkina
- Running time: 960 minutes
- Production company: Lenfilm

Original release
- Release: 1988

The Life of Klim Samgin (Russian: Жизнь Клима Самгина, romanized: Zhizn Klima Samgina) is a 14-part 1988 Soviet TV series by director Viktor Titov, based on the eponymous novel (1927—1936) by Maxim Gorky. The series premiered on television in March–April 1988.

== Plot ==
The film describes the life of the Russian intellectual Klim Samgin against the backdrop of grandiose panorama of 40 years of Russian life, from 1877 to 1917.

== Cast ==
- Andrey Rudensky as Klim Ivanovich Samgin
- Leonid Gorelik as Klim Samgin (in childhood)
- Yelena Solovey as Vera Petrovna, mother of Klim
- Ernst Romanov as Ivan Akimovich Samgin, father of Klim
- Armen Dzhigarkhanyan as Timofei Stepanovich Varavka, stepfather of Klim
- Sergey Koltakov as Dr. Konstantin Makarov, friend of Klim
- Svetlana Kryuchkova as Lyubov Somova
- Mikhail Gluzsky as Yakov Akimovich Samgin, uncle of Klim
- Natalya Gundareva as Marina Petrovna Zotova (Premirova)
- Andrei Boltnev as gendarme Colonel Popov
- Larisa Guzeeva as Elizaveta Spivak
- Yevgeniya Glushenko as Maria Ivanovna Nikonova
- Alexander Kalyagin as Ivan Mitrofanov / Yakov Kotelnikov, an agent of the secret police
- Igor Vladimirov as Andrey Sergeyevich Prozorov
- Sergei Makovetsky as Dmitri Samghin, brother of Klim
- Andrey Kharitonov as Igor Turoboev
- Victor Kostetskiy as Georgy Gapon
- Valentin Gaft as Valery Trifonov, officer-drunk
- Vladimir Soshalsky as Valentin Bezbedov
- Vsevolod Shilovsky as Zahar Petrovich Berdnikov, businessman
- Aleksei Loktev as Grigory Popov
- Irina Rozanova as Tosya
- Lyubov Sokolova as Anfimovna
- Viktor Bychkov as beekeeper
- Irina Kupchenko as lady on reception at the lawyer
- Aleksandr Galibin as Diomidov; Nicholas II of Russia
- Andrejs Žagars as Kutuzov

== Awards ==
- Honorary Diploma Manson special 4th episode of Province. 1886 at the International Film Festival in Monte Carlo (1989).
- Professional Award Lenfilm studio in 1988 the artist Yuri Pugach (1989).
