= Requital =

2006 video game

- Developers: Akella, Primal Software
- Publisher: Excalibur Publishing
- Platform: Microsoft Windows
- Release: 2006
- Genre: Role-playing video game
- Mode: Single-player

Requital is a 2006 action RPG developed by Akella and Primal Software and released by Excalibur Publishing on the Microsoft Windows platform. According to the developers, part of the motivation in making Requital was to create an authentic 6th century Russian world for the player to explore. As such, the game veers away from anachronisms and modern fantastical elements like magic and mythological creatures. Instead, it is more centered on historical realism mixed with superstitions which existed in that period of Russian history.

== Story ==
The player takes the part of Wolfhound as he attempts to avenge himself on those who destroyed his clan, murdered his parents and enslaved him as a young boy. The setting is based on the fantasy novel The Wolfhound (Волкодав, 1995, by Maria Semyonova) somewhat popular in modern Russia.

== Gameplay ==
Gameplay is simple, the player moves by clicking the mouse and can also click on other characters to talk to or attack them. Wolfhound has three main skills, unarmed combat, melee weapons and ranged attacks, and four main characteristics, Constitution, Strength, Dexterity and Speed. The player can upgrade his abilities as he gains experience and choose new special feats such as a special attack to knock an enemy down; skills improve through use. The player must explore the landscape, become more powerful and find better weapons, armour and equipment in order to complete his quest.

== Reception ==
Overall, the game received indifferent but polarized reviews. Most critics agreed that Requital did not compete with big-budget titles, but it still held its own among lower-budget titles, earning some ratings of 8 out of 10. Criticisms included mediocre graphics, poorly translated dialog, linear gameplay and a lackluster game opening. Good points included a leveling system where skills improved the more they were used, the necessity of tactical strategy as the game progressed and charming environments to explore.
