= I'm Staying =

- Directed by: Karen Oganesyan
- Written by: Dmitri Konstantinov; Alyona Zvantsova
- Starring: Andrey Krasko; Fyodor Bondarchuk
- Cinematography: Evgeniy Privin
- Music by: Artyom Erzinkyan; Garik Saribekyan
- Release date: 1 April 2007
- Running time: 1 hour 52 minutes
- Country: Russia
- Language: Russian

I'm Staying (Russian: Я остаюсь, romanized: Ya ostayus) is a 2007 Russian comedy-drama film, directorial debut of Karen Oganesyan.

== Plot ==
Dr. Tyrsa treats people with the usual medical methods and is irritated when people want to discuss with him the otherworldly, afterlife and communication with the deceased. The only thing that really can touch his heart is the fate of his only daughter who is unrequitedly in love with her boss. It is because of her that the doctor gets in trouble: as a result of being hit on the head with a bowling ball, he falls into a coma – the state between life and death. From this moment on his views on the world change significantly. Having met other people in the other world who are also in a coma, he becomes more humane, wise and tolerant. This helps him to return to life, protect his daughter from the encroachments of a cynical suitor and help her to find true love.

== Cast ==
- Andrey Krasko as Victor Tyrsa
- Fyodor Bondarchuk as Instructor
- Andrey Sokolov as Gleb Shahov
- Elena Yakovleva as Natalia Tyrsa
- Nelli Uvarova as Evgeniya Tyrsa
- Yelena Bondarchuk as Anna
- Evgeny Zharikov as doctor Oleg Saprunov
