= Dmytro Shurov =

Ukrainian pianist

Dmytro Shurov Дмитро Шкуров
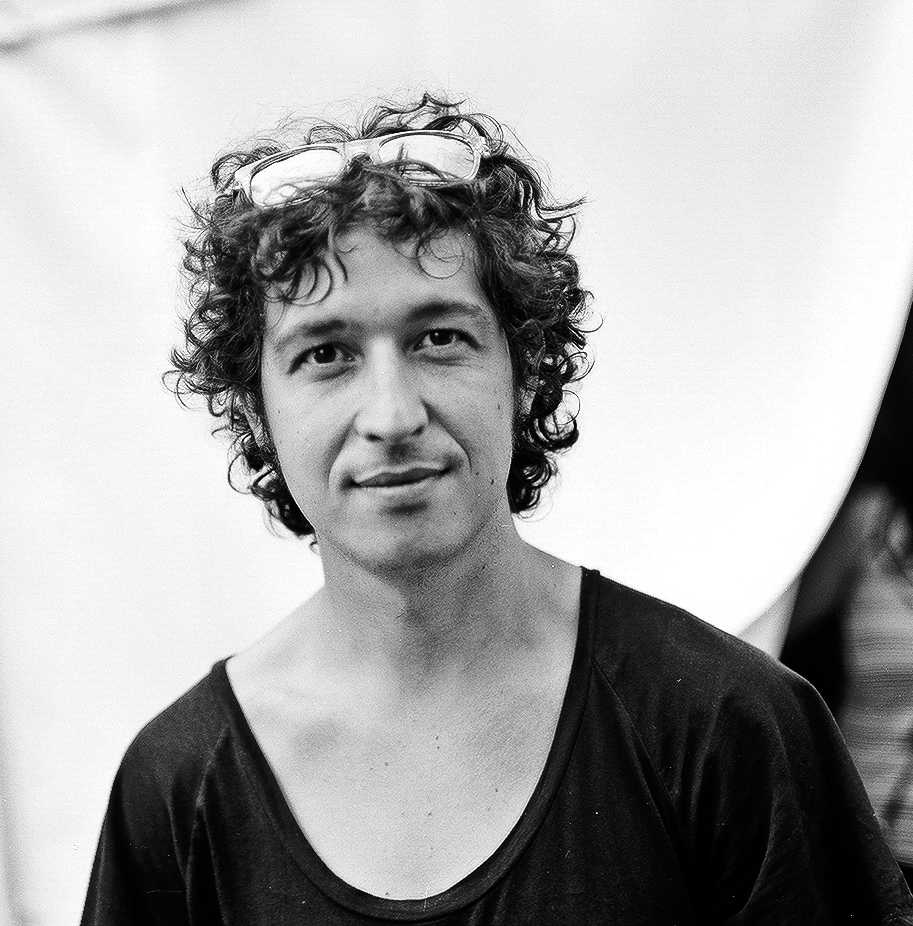
- Shurov in 2011

Background information
- Born: 31 October 1981 (age 44); Vinnytsia, Ukrainian SSR, Soviet Union
- Instruments: Vocals; piano; keyboard; guitar
- Website: dmitryshurov.com

Dmytro Ihorovych Shurov (Ukrainian: Дмитро Ігорович Шуров, pronounced [dmɪˈtrɔ ˈiɦorowɪtʃ ˈʃurou̯]; born 31 October 1981) is a Ukrainian pianist, composer, and singer-songwriter based in Kyiv. He was also a judge on the Ukrainian X-Factor for the eighth and ninth seasons, as well as the music producer of the Ukrainian selection for the Eurovision Song Contest 2023 and 2024.

== Early life ==
Shurov was born on 31 October 1981 in Vinnytsia. His father, Ihor, is a poet and painter, and his mother is a teacher and musician. Dmytro started playing the piano at four years old.

Shurov studied in lyceum Auguste Renoir in Limoges, France and in Utah, United States where he sang in the choir and played in the jazz band and the orchestra, which performed compositions of the Baroque period; he also played in the quartet "Barbershop". After coming back from the U.S., Shurov applied to Kyiv National Linguistic University.

== Career ==
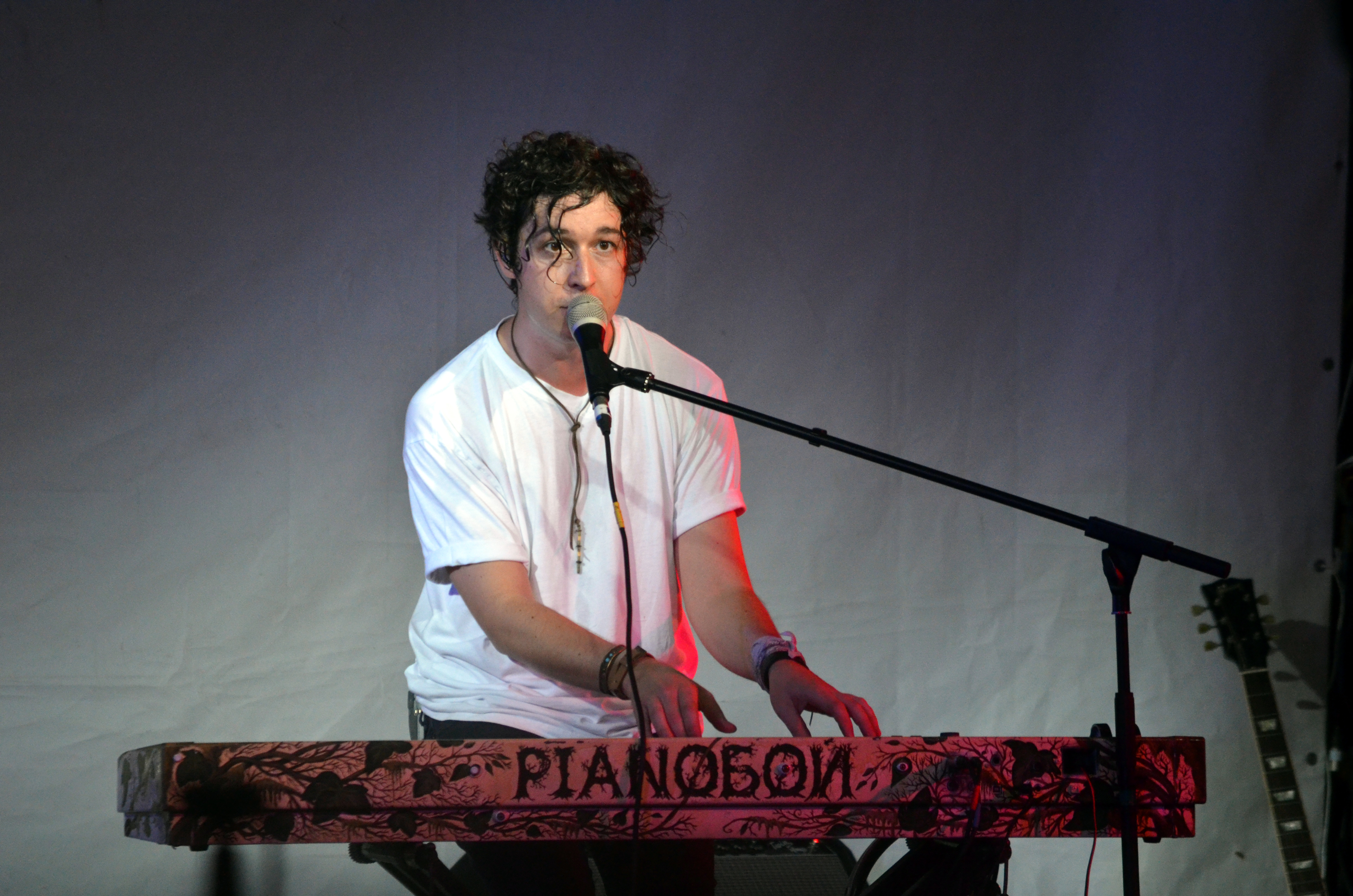
Pianoboy in Green Theatre, 2014

Shurov joined Okean Elzy as a session member in 2000. Later in 2001, he became part of the band and gained popularity alongside the increasingly popular band. In 2004, Shurov left the band to join a newly formed band, Esthetic Education, with another member of Okean Elzy, bass player Yuriy Khustochka. Esthetic Education remained active until 2008. In 2009, Shurov started his own project called "Pianoboy" (Pianoбой).

Shurov was a co-organizer of Kyiv's festival Moloko Music Fest in 2008 and 2009 as a part of Gogolfest. He composed music for films, including Khottabych, television series Servant of the People, as well as for comedy and fashion shows. He is a brand ambassador of Yamaha in Ukraine.

Shurov participated in the 2nd Summit of First Ladies and Gentlemen, where he spontaneously collaborated with Ellie Goulding in a performance of the song "Oi u luzi chervona kalyna".

== Activism ==
In 2016, Shurov participated in a charitable photography project called "Щирі. Спадщина" (Sincere. Heritage) aimed at raising funds for Ukrainian museums.

In 2018, Shurov became actively involved in advocating for women's rights by joining the HeForShe movement. He and his son were appointed as ambassadors for the movement in Ukraine, focusing on addressing gender inequality issues like domestic violence.

In response to the February 2022 Russian invasion of Ukraine, Shurov became a volunteer. He actively participated in transporting humanitarian aid and organizing charitable concerts for military personnel, medical professionals, and rescuers. These efforts aimed to support the urgent needs of the Armed Forces of Ukraine (ZSU) and raise funds for tactical medicine. As a testament to his significant contributions, Shurov was bestowed with the esteemed state recognition of the Order of Merit third class, in August 2022.

== Controversy ==
In April 2021, Shurov faced public backlash for smashing a contestant's guitar as a judge in the 8th season of the Ukrainian X-Factor, as he did not like the contestant's performance. It was later revealed that the contestant, Juri Hancurkan (whose real name is Sergey Pelykh), had received the guitar from his late father. Neither Shurov nor X-Factor have ever publicly apologized for the incident. Some media reports suggest the act was merely a publicity stunt to gain more viewers for the show.

== Personal life ==
Shurov married Olha Tarakanovska in 2003. The two have a son, born 23 August 2003. The family lives in Kyiv.

== Discography ==
Soundtracks

- Music for performance "Cinderella" (Sovremennik Theatre, 2014)
- Soundtrack for performance "Vartovi Mriy" (2015)
- Soundtrack for Ukrainian humorous show "Liga smihu" (League of Laughter)
- "Orangelove" (2007)
- "Playing with toy soldiers" (2007)
- "How to Find the Ideal" (2007)
- "Button" (2008)
- "Tainstvennyy ostrov" (2008)
- Series "Servant of the People (TV series)" (2015)
- Series "Neispravimye" (2017)

Okean Elzy

- "Model" (2001)
- "Supersimetria" (2003)
- "Tvіy format" (2003)

Esthetic Education

- "Face Reading" (2004)
- "Leave Us Alone" (2005)
- "Live at Ring" (2006, live album)
- "Werewolf" (2007)

Zemfira

- "Spasibo" (2007)
- "Zelonyy teatr v Zemfire" (2008) (DVD)
- "Z-Sides" (2009, compilation album)
- "Zemfira.Live2" (2010, live album)
- "Krokus/Strelka" (2010, live album, in few tracks)

Svyatoslav Vakarchuk

- "Brussel" (2011, Brussels)

Pianoboy

- "Prostyye veshchi" (2012, Simple things)
- "Ne prekrashchay mechtat" (2013, Don't stop dreaming)
- "Take Off" (2015)
- "XICTOPI" (2019)
- "Zabroshka" (2020)

== Awards and nominations ==
Year	Nominated work	Category	Award	Result	Res.
2013	Dmytro Shurov	"Singer»	Elle Style Awards Ukraine	Won	
2017	Dmytro Shurov	"Men»	Viva! Naykrasyvishi	Nominated	
2018	Dmytro Shurov	"Men»	Viva! Naykrasyvishi	Nominated	

== External resources ==
- Official website
- Esthetic Education, Киевский Рок Клуб
- "Profile of Dmytro Shurov on xfactor.stb.ua" (in Ukrainian). Х-Фактор.
