= Andrey Rudensky =

Russian actor

- Андрей Руденский
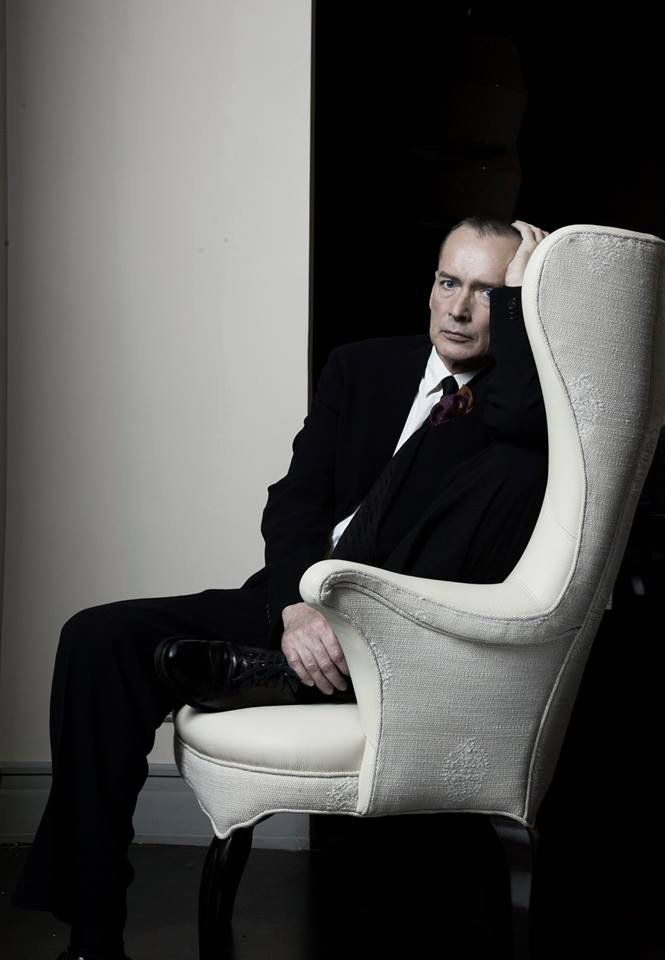
- Rudensky in 2017
- Born: Andrey Viktorovich Rudensky; 26 January 1959 (age 67); Sverdlovsk, Russian SFSR, Soviet Union
- Education: Mikhail Shchepkin Higher Theatre School
- Occupation: Actor
- Years active: 1984–present

Andrey Viktorovich Rudensky (Russian: Андре́й Ви́кторович Руде́нский; born 26 January 1959) is a Soviet and Russian film and stage actor.

== Biography ==
Andrey Rudensky was born in Sverdlovsk, Russian SFSR, Soviet Union (now Yekaterinburg, Russia). In a military family. He graduated from the Sverdlovsk Polytechnic with a degree in rolling production, then he studied at Ural State Academy of Architecture and Arts. In 1984 he graduated from Mikhail Shchepkin Higher Theatre School (course of Viktor Korshunov). Since 1993 to 2001 he played in the company of the Moscow New Drama Theatre.

Currently, Andrey is not busy in the theater.

== Selected filmography ==
- The Life of Klim Samgin (1987) as Klim Ivanovich Samgin
- Sea Wolf (1990) as Humphrey Van Weyden
- Demons (1992) as Stavrogin
- And Quiet Flows the Don (1992) as Yevgeny Listnitsky
- Roman Alla Russa (1994) as Mario Fonitsetti
- Our God's Brother as Polish artist
- Request Stop (1999) as Sergey Klenin
- Empire under Attack (2000) as Pyotr Stoedzinsky
- Request Stop 2 (2001) as Sergey Klenin
- Another Life (2003) as Igor
- Yesenin (2005) as Alexander Blok
- The Turkish Gambit (2005) as Lestvitsky
- Wolfhound (2006) as Tilorn
- The Stepfather (2007) as Leonid
- Kromov (2009) as Stenbok
- Jolly Fellows (2009) as Gosha
- Eagle Eye (2011) as Gladiator
- Cruise (2011) as Valentin Nazimov
- Lecturer (2011) as Domaskin, monk
- Thin Ice (2015) as Boris Chuysky
- A Rough Draft (2018) as Kirill's father
