= Heart of a Dog (1988 film) =

- Russian Blu-Ray Disc cover
- Based on: Heart of a Dog by Mikhail Bulgakov
- Screenplay by: Natalya Bortko
- Directed by: Vladimir Bortko
- Starring: Yevgeny Yevstigneyev; Boris Plotnikov; Vladimir Tolokonnikov; Nina Ruslanova
- Music by: Vladimir Dashkevich
- Country of origin: Soviet Union
- Original language: Russian

Production
- Cinematography: Yuri Shaigardanov
- Editor: Leda Semyonova
- Running time: 130 minutes
- Production companies: Lenfilm, Actors Association of Television Films, 20th Century Fox Television
- Budget: $5 million

Original release
- Release: 19 November 1988

Heart of a Dog (Russian: Собачье сердце, translit. Sobachye serdtse) is a black-and-white 1988 Soviet comedy-drama science fiction television film directed by Vladimir Bortko. It is based on Mikhail Bulgakov's novel Heart of a Dog.

Premiering show of the film aired on 20 November 1988 at 18:45 on the Central Television Programme One and aired on 1989 at 8:00 PM on the ABC. The film consisted of two episodes.

== Plot ==
The film is set in Moscow not long after the October Revolution. A weary stray dog looks for food and shelter. A well-off and well-known surgeon and professor, Philipp Philippovich Preobrazhensky, happens to need a dog and, with a piece of sausage, lures the animal to his large apartment, used both for living and medical practice. The dog is named Sharik and well taken care of by the doctor's maids, but he still wonders why he is there. He finds out only too late that he is needed as a test animal. The doctor implants a pituitary gland and testicles of a recently deceased alcoholic and petty criminal, Klim Chugunkin, into Sharik.

Sharik proceeds to become more and more human during the following days. After his transition to human is complete, it turns out that he inherited all the negative traits of the donor (bad manners, aggressiveness, use of profanity, heavy drinking), but he still hates cats. He picks for himself the absurd name Poligraf Poligrafovich Sharikov, starts working at the Moscow department for extermination of stray animals and associates himself with the new Bolshevist building administration, who strive to take away part of Professor Preobrazhensky's big apartment (an ongoing sub-plot of the film). Eventually, Sharikov turns life in the professor's apartment into a nightmare by stealing money, breaking his furniture, flooding the apartment during a cat chase, etc.

Preobrazhensky and his friend and assistant, Dr. Bormental, see all of their efforts to reform Sharikov fail. Eventually Preobrazhensky learns that Sharikov has attempted to denounce him to the Soviet secret police. Preobrazhensky then demands for Sharikov to leave the apartment immediately and for good. Sharikov angrily refuses and draws a revolver. An infuriated Bormental attacks Sharikov and, after a short but violent fight, subdues him. Preobrazhensky then chooses to reverse the procedure.

Sharikov turns back into a dog. As Sharik, he remembers little about what has happened to him but is not much concerned about that. To his content, he is left to live in Preobrazhensky's apartment.

== Cast ==
- Yevgeny Yevstigneyev as Professor Philipp Philippovich Preobrazhensky
- Boris Plotnikov as Dr. Ivan Arnoldovich Bormental, the professor's assistant
- Vladimir Tolokonnikov as Poligraf Poligrafovich Sharikov
- Nina Ruslanova as Darya Petrovna Ivanova, a cook in the professor's apartment
- Roman Kartsev as Schwonder, a chairman of the building committee
- Olga Melikhova as Zinaida Prokofievna Bunina, a housemaid and the nurse
  - (voice-over for Melikhova is by Svetlana Smirnova)
- Dog Karai as Sharik, a stray dog
- Anzhelika Nevolina as Vasnetsova, a typist out of the office
- Mikhail Stein (uncredited) as the "being", half-dog/half-man (Sharik at transitional stage)

== Details ==
This screen version of M. Bulgakov's novel is famous for its fidelity to the original text. Practically nothing was deleted in the adaptation. In a documentary about the film, the cinematographer recalls that when he asked the director for the script, Bortko simply gave him a magazine with the text of the novel. When the baffled cinematographer objected, the next day Bortko gave him the same text, but with descriptions of nature and other such details crossed out. There are however some differences between the novel and the film: some scenes in the film involving spiritualism, the prophetess in the circus, and a Soviet style christening ("Octobering") were taken from early short stories by Bulgakov, rather than the novel.

== Awards and honors ==
- Awards at several domestic and international film festivals, including Prix Italia (1989)
- Vasilyev Brothers State Prize of the RSFSR (1990)

== See also ==
- Dog's Heart, a 1976 joint Italian-German comedy film directed by Alberto Lattuada based on the novel
