= Order (film) =

- Russian: Заказ
- Directed by: Vera Glagoleva
- Written by: Sergey Ashkenazi; Vera Glagoleva
- Produced by: Aleksandr Franskevich-Laye; Natalya Ivanova; Maria Ksinopulo; Tatyana Nikolaeva
- Starring: Nataliya Vdovina; Aleksandr Baluev; Larisa Guzeeva; Vladimir Sterzhakov; Aleksandr Yakovlev
- Cinematography: Aleksandr Nosovskiy
- Music by: Sergei Banevich
- Release date: 2005
- Country: Russia
- Language: Russian

Order (Russian: Заказ) is a 2005 Russian drama film directed by Vera Glagoleva.

== Plot ==
The film tells about a woman who leaves her husband, as a result of which she tries to commit suicide, but can't decide. Suddenly, several contract killings take place in front of her eyes and each time she sees the same man who is likely to commit these crimes and she orders him her murder.

== Cast ==
- Nataliya Vdovina as Anna
- Aleksandr Baluev as Oleg
- Larisa Guzeeva as Galya
- Vladimir Sterzhakov as Natan
- Aleksandr Yakovlev as Igor
- Anna Nosatova as Lena
- Leonid Anisimov
- Galina Kobzar-Slobodyuk as Yarofeyeva
- Aleksandr Nosovsky
- Vsevolod Kabanov
