= Alyona Zvantsova =

Russian film director and screenwriter

Alyona Zvantsova (Алёна Званцова, real name: Елена Владимировна Константинова (Elena Vladimirovna Konstantinova), born September 11, 1971, in Tomsk) is a Russian film director and screenwriter. She directed and/or wrote over two dozen feature films. She won, among other awards, a public award at Pacific Meridian festival in 2015.

== Filmography ==
=== Screenplays ===
- Young Wolfhound (TV, 2006–2007)
- The Thaw (TV, 2013)
- I’m Staying (2017)
