= Nikolay Stravinsky =

Russian musician (born 1986)

Nikolay Stravinsky Николай Алексеевич Стравинский
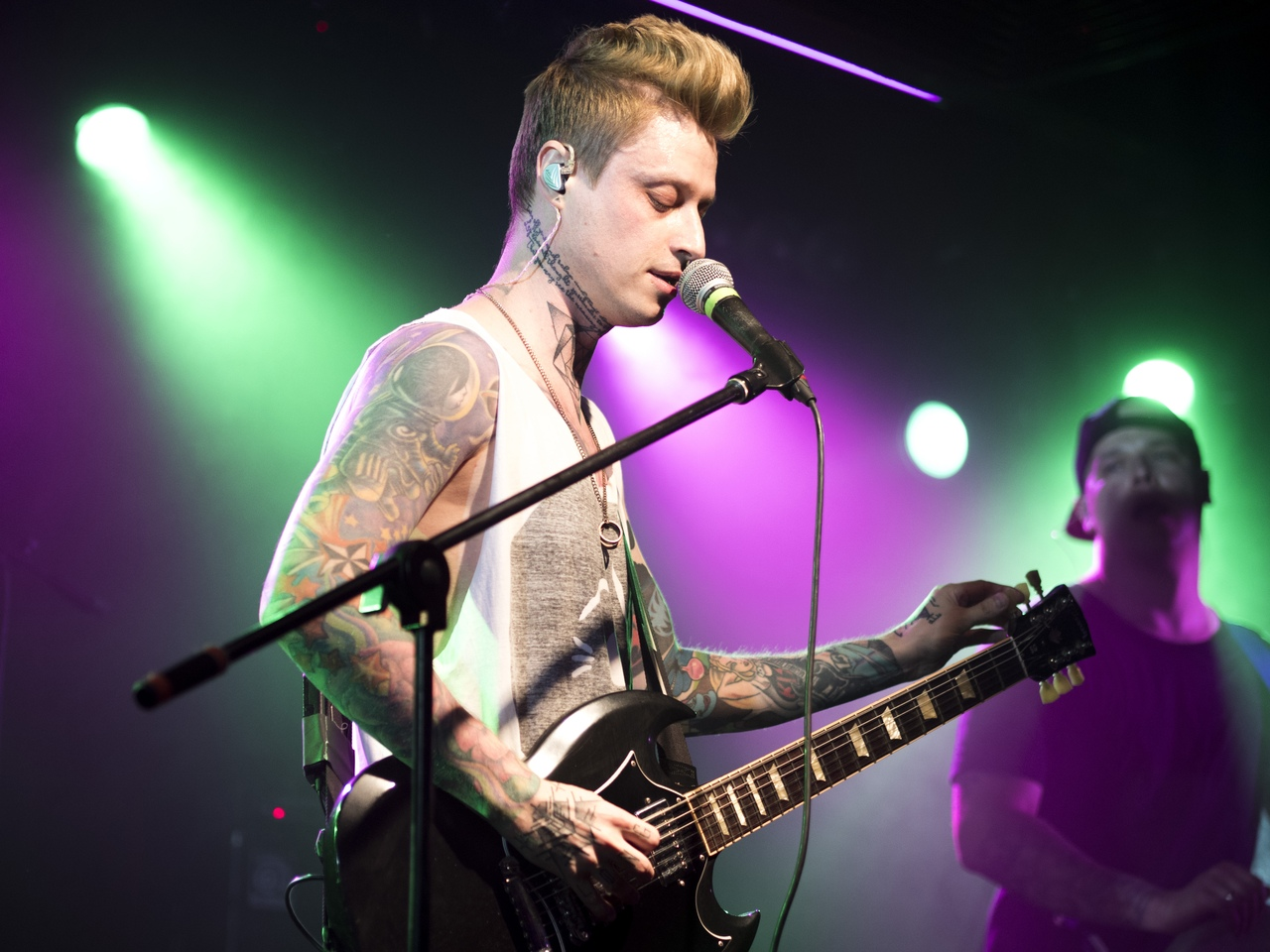
- Stravinsky performing in 2020

Background information
- Born: 23 February 1986 (age 40); Ulyanovsk, Russia
- Genres: Rock; punk rock; indie; synthpop
- Occupation: Musician
- Instruments: Guitar; bass; drums; keyboards; vocals
- Years active: 2005–present
- Member of: Selfieman; Narkomfin
- Formerly of: Фея Драже; Ракеты из России; Тараканы!
- Website: selfieman.ru narkomfin.band

Nikolai Alekseevich Stravinsky (born 23 February 1986) is a Russian musician, composer, and multi-instrumentalist. Among other projects, he is known for performing under the name Selfieman. Previously, he played guitar with the punk band Тараканы! (Cockroaches), drums with punk supergroup Ракеты из России (Rockets from Russia), as well as singing and playing guitar with the band Фея Драже (Sugar Plum Fairy).

== Biography ==
=== Early life and musical studies ===
Nikolai Stravinsky was born in the city of Ulyanovsk on 23 February 1986. He was interested in music since childhood, and on his fifth birthday, his parents gave him a toy drum. Stravinsky learned to play the drum, and later began to study the guitar and piano. His musical tastes were influenced by The Beatles, which remain one of his favorite bands. His parents sent Stravinsky to a music school, where he sang in the choir. He continued by spending nine years at a dance school, where he studied classical, folk, and pop dances. At the age of 18, Stravinsky moved to Samara to continue his studies. In 2007, he graduated in classical guitar studies, and in 2013, he completed drum studies at the Samara State Institute of Culture. While there, he worked for a year and a half as a percussionist in the symphony orchestra of the opera and ballet theater.

=== Sugar Plum Fairy ===
After graduating, Stravinsky performed in various rock groups, but the turning point in his musical career was the creation of the band Фея Драже (Sugar Plum Fairy), which he joined as vocalist. Once part of the band, he also began to play guitar and write lyrics. Фея Драже played their first concert on 25 August 2005, though at this stage they were called Трупы на запчасти (Corpses for Parts). They adopted the name Sugar Plum Fairy from Tchaikovsky's ballet The Nutcracker. They recorded their first album, Не думай, Не Повторяй — Просто Действуй (Don't Think, Don't Repeat - Just Act), in their hometown of Samara and mixed it in Saint Petersburg with the help of the sound engineer for local band Animal Jazz. It was released in 2009.

Фея Драже released their second and last album, Danse de la Fée Dragée, in 2010, before breaking up. At this point, Stravinsky moved to Moscow.

=== Rockets from Russia and Cockroaches! ===
After moving to Moscow, Stravinsky joined the cover band Ракеты из России (Rockets from Russia). He mainly played drums but also sang some songs with the group. In 2011, the rhythm guitarist of the punk band Тараканы! (Cockroaches!) left and Dmitry Spirin, the band's vocalist, who also played guitar in Ракеты из России, asked Stravinsky to take over. He was initially a temporary member but a year later his status with the band became permanent. He took part in the recording of the band's albums MaximumHappy I (2013) and MaximumHappy II (2013), as well as Сила одного (The Power of One) (2016). During the band's Baltic mini-tour of Latvia and Estonia in 2014, the drummer wasn't able to get a visa, and thus Stravinsky replaced him on the kit for the duration of the tour. In 2017, Stravinsky left both Тараканы! and Ракеты из России after obtaining permanent residence in the United States.

=== Selfieman and other projects ===
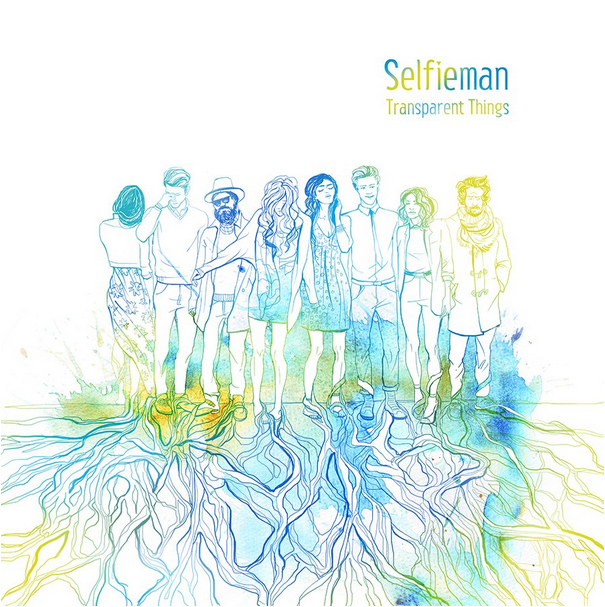
Transparent Things album cover

In 2009, Animal Jazz recorded a cover version of the song "Круги на воде" (Circles on the Water) by Mashina Vremeni, and Stravinsky was asked to record a guitar solo for it. In July 2013, the musician starred in the Snow Patrol video for the song "The Lightning Strike". Also in 2013, Stravinsky released his first experimental solo project under his own name, a 3-track single with pop rock and electronic influences. The record included collaborations from Anton Semin of Ideя Fix, David "Ptaha" Nuriev of Centr, Sergei Repin from Фея Драже, and Timur Yessetov of Anacondaz. At the end of 2013, Ideя Fix invited Stravinsky to work on their single "Куадрилья Баллиста", for which he recorded two guitar solos.

In 2014, Stravinsky launched the one-man synthpop/rock project Selfieman. According to Stravinsky, the name is a combination of "selfie" and "mania", and all the songs are sung in English. All vocal and instrumental parts are performed by Stravinsky, and all lyrics are written by his friend, novelist and poet Dmitry Labzin.

The project's first album, Transparent Things, was recorded at studios in Düsseldorf and Moscow and released in 2014. Stravinsky has stated that the music of Scottish rock band Biffy Clyro influenced his songwriting on the album. The project quickly gained popularity and saw Stravinsky performing at various festivals, including Dobrofest. The live lineup for Selfieman included drummer Sergei Kivin and guitarist Yevgeny Ryakhovsky from Animal Jazz, as well as Sakura guitarist Alexey Lovyagin. On 12 February 2016, Selfieman's second album, Relative Time, was released. That year, Stravinsky began performing live sets without a backing band.

On 30 March 2023, Selfieman released the EP 28. Unlike its two predecessors, which are both sung in English, the lyrics on 28 are all in Russian.

=== Narkomfin ===
In 2018, Stravinsky launched a new project, the pop punk band Narkomfin. The group's lyrics deal with social and political issues in Russia. They have released three albums to date: Ulyanovsk (2018), Голливуд (Hollywood – 2019), and Работает Железо (Works Iron – 2020).

== Discography ==
with Фея Драже

- Demo (2006)
- Не думай, Не Повторяй — Просто Действуй (Don't Think, Don't Repeat - Just Act) (2009)
- Danse de la Fée Dragée (2010)

with Тараканы!

- MaximumHappy I (2013)
- MaximumHappy II (2013)
- Russian Democrazy (2014 - US release)
- MaximumHappy Live (2014)
- Сила одного (The Power of One) (2016)

Nikolay Stravinsky

- Nikolay Stravinsky (2013)

Selfieman

- Transparent Things (2014)
- Relative Time (2016)
- 28 (2023)

Narkomfin

- Ulyanovsk (2018)
- Голливуд (Hollywood) (2019)
- Работает Железо (Works Iron) (2020)
