= Mnogotochie (rap group) =

Russian hip hop band from Moscow

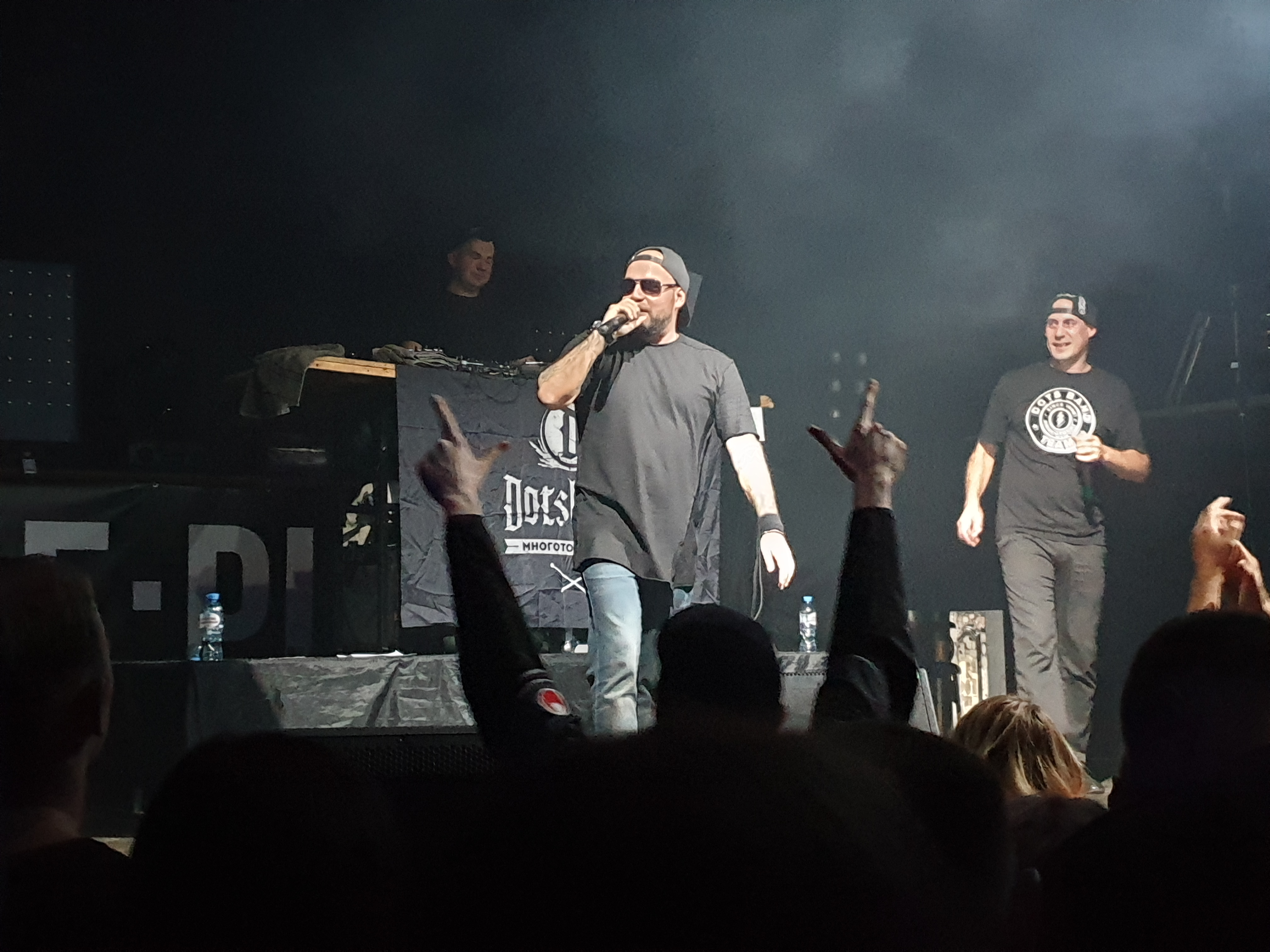

Background information
- Origin: Moscow, Russia
- Genres: Gangsta rap; psychedelic rap; political hip hop
- Years active: Mnogotochie: 1998–2007; DotsFam: from 2005 Mnogotochie Band: from 2011
- Labels: Монолит Рекордс; Dots Family Records; КвадроДиск
- Members: Rustaveli, DJ Hassan
- Past members: Kuzmitch (КузьмитчЪ); Tyuha; Grek; Gena Grom; Gnom; King-Kong; Dimon; L.BeeAtch (Бьяча)
- Website: http://www.mnogotochie.ru

Mnogotochie (Russian: Многото́чие, lit. 'ellipsis') is a Russian hip hop group from Moscow. They perform in the styles of gangsta rap, psychedelic rap, and political rap with elements of Russian chanson and rock. Rustaveli was the unofficial leader of the band and author of its lyrics.

In 1999, Mnogotochie performed at Rap Music 1999, but did not win any prizes. The next year they won the prize at the Micro 2000 fest (Микро 2000) – the same festival where MC L.E. won at the freestyle battle. At the fest Adidas Streetball Challenge 2001, the band won the third place.

The band has released three albums.

In 2006, the band announced their split and later continued performing under two names, DotsFam and Mnogotochie Band (Многоточие Band). While other members of the band frequently changed, Rustaveli remained its only constant member.

== Membership ==
The group's membership is listed according to the official website as of April 2018.

=== Mnogotochie Band (Многоточие Band) ===
- Rustaveli (Руставели);
- DJ Hassan;
- Sanches (Санчес);
- Grel (Грел) (bass guitar);
- Andrea (Андрэ) (guitar);
- Jeka GoodKoFF (Жэка GoodKoFF) (guitar);
- VictOr (ВиктОр) (keyboards);
- "J"/Lyoha Oryol ("J"/Лёха Орёл) (drums);
- Alexey (Алексей) (saxophone).

=== Mnogotochie / DotsFam (Многоточие / DotsFam) ===
- Rustaveli (Руставели);
- DJ Hassan;
- Sanches (Санчес);
- MC L.E. (Nelegal; Lasha Imanishvilli);
- Dinice(Динайс);
- White Hot Ice.

=== Past members ===
- Kuzmitch (КузьмитчЪ) (MC 1.8; DJ Navvy; Ilya Kuznetsov) — arrangements, lyrics, mc'ing, back vocals, ideas;
- DJ Hassan – arrangements, scratches, remixes (1998–2002);
- King-Kong (Кинг-Конг) (Alexy Piskachev) — rapping ( tracks Heads (Бошки), Who didn't use a chiva (Кто не бахался), Wet place (Мокрое место), Turn (Поворот)) (dead 4 January 2006);
- Grek (Грек) (Anatoly Grechihin) (dead 22 February 2006);
- Tyuha (Тюха) (Andrey Trynov) — arrangements, guitars, design, vocal, lyrics, mc'ing;
- Gena Grom(Гена Гром) — lyrics, mc'ing, back vocals, ideas;
- L.BeeAtch aka Byacha (Бьяча) — lyrics, mc'ing, back vocals;
- Dimon (Димон) (Dmitry Korablin) — arrangements, lyrics, mc'ing;
- Gnom (Гном);
- Mihail Krasnoderevshik.

== Style ==
Since the group's formation, its members have decided to adhere to strict behavior standards in their work and its implementation. Any attempts to use the name of the collective for dishonest earnings were disallowed. The organizers of the group's performances were required to prevent photography and video filming that was not approved by the group. In the event of failure to comply with this condition, the concert was stopped and the blame for the disruption of the concert fell on the organizers. However, this faded into the background over time, as more and more viewers had phones with photo and video cameras. The group has not shot a single music video.

There was a specific dress style for members – leather jackets, trousers, black shoes. According to the band, this style was chosen because the color black predisposes the listener to more fully appreciate the lyrics than a combination of different colors, which is distracting .

== History ==
=== Band formation ===
Mnogotochie began to form in Moscow in 1997 when Rustaveli, who wrote lyrics, and DJ Hassan, who made electronic music, met in Moscow in 1997. Later, they were joined by Rustaveli's schoolmate Grel as bass guitarist and rapper Kuzmitch as second MC. Next joined guitarist Tyuha. Also joined closest friends of Rustaveli King-Kong and MC L.E.

The group was founded on 15 November 1998, the day of their first studio session. The name "Mnogotochie", meaning "Ellipsis", emphasizes the understatement that sounds in many of their songs, the constant search for new paths in life.

The ellipsis is what opens the doors to consciousness for you, and which one to enter, which one to stay behind, which one not to enter at all, is a personal matter for each of you... Secondly, the ellipsis is what remains after death.

— Rustaveli, Rustaveli in one interview, http://www.rap.ru/ru/reading/id-25808

=== First albums (1998–2002) ===
Over time, the band debuted new members – L.BeeAtch, MC L.E., Gena Grom, and Dimon. Most of them were about 20 years old at the time. The band debuted on stage at the Rap Music 99 festival where was released on the compilation Golos ulits 2. But since 2001, Mnogotochie has stopped performing it at their performances. Rustaveli later commented on this in an interview:

I came up with this song in 1998, and wrote my verse and chorus from the heart. It is about real feelings and real events. And this, in my opinion, is a very soulful composition. But the unhealthy excitement that it caused, back then, in 2001, made me understand that it should be excluded from the repertoire ... Too much needed to be said, and much of it did not fit with this song.

— Rustaveli, NewYear interview of DotsFam, http://www.dotsfamrec.ru/interwiu/interwiu18.html

On 25 December 2001, Mnogotochie's debut album Zhizn' i Svoboda was released under the Kvadro-disk label. Musical critics called it one of the most important Russian rap albums.

Before 2002, the band had a producer – Vladimir Ferapontov. The first album didn't make a profit for the band. They were forced to give up the rights to distribute the album for six years. In 2002, they released their second album Atomy zsoznaniya. They founded the record label Dots Family Records where they released their next albums as well as those of other groups.

=== Tretiy put' (2003–2005) ===
In 2002, Mnogotochie met with the Moscow rap group M.Squad and came up with the idea to create a supergroup, called Tretiy put'. In 2003, the supergroup's first album, Kusok zhizni (Pyati godam raven), was released.

This year at fifth anniversary of band was released compilation «Nenomernoy» («Неномерной») consisting of seven remixes from related musicians and six new tracks. According to the interview of Rustaveli this album is not fully functional it lives up to its name – not numbered, it is not third LP of band.

In 2004, Tretiy put's second album, Burime 12, was released, feautring MC L.E, Krasnoye Derevо, and Smena Mneniy. In October, MC L.E. released a maxi-single in English, titled In spite of all. The music was produced by Kuzmitch, Dimon, and Kapus.

=== Breakup (2006) ===
In May 2006, MC L.E. released a solo album, Illegal, featuring Rustaveli, Mikhail Krasnoderevschik, Kapus, S.S.A., and Fleur. «Fleur» produced by Kuzmitch and «Fat Complex». A music video was shot for the song "Someday" featuring S.S.A. After the album's release, MC L.E. returned to Russia.

In December 2006, rumors spread that Mnogotochie was breaking up. The rumors were confirmed when an interview with Rustaveli appeared on the official Dots Family Records website. The reasons behind the breakup remained undisclosed; it was only stated that Kuzmitch left of his own accord.

I am tired of being the way I was then. And it is not even about the role, but rather about myself. In order to stray from the right path, it is enough to make a few small mistakes, which entail a whole bunch of large and very unworthy ones. I don’t care about the role, and in general you can do whatever you want, read rap or tighten screws, the main thing is to remain human.

— Andrey Nikitin, http://www.rap.ru/ru/reading/id-27440

Gena Grom chose to pursue law, interrupting his musical career. MC L.E was forced to stay in Georgia due to the deterioration of Russian-Georgian relations. Lyuba (L.BeeAtch) chose to devote herself to her family and gave birth to a son in 2010. She continues to communicate with other past and current members. In addition, in 2006, two of members of the group passed away – King-Kong (one of the founders of the band and a close friend of Rustaveli) and Grek.

On 5 March 2007, the band's third and final album, Za beskonechnost' vremeni, was released. In fact it was solo work of Rustaveli without any team.

Mnogotochie, purely as Mnogotochie, ends its journey with this album. And I think it was a worthy journey. And I don't regret anything.

— Rustaveli in online interview 2006 year, https://web.archive.org/web/20091112202536/http://www.dotsfamrec.ru/interwiu/interwiu14.html

With the departure of Gena Grom as CEO and Kuzmitch as second co-founder, Dots Family Records turned into an independent, unregistered label functioning only for internal projects.

=== Successor groups ===
==== DotsFam ====
DotsFam (originally Dots Family) is the spiritual successor of Mnogotochie, consisting of Rustaveli, Dimon, Nelegal (aka MC L.E.), and Mikhail Krasnoderevshik.

On 15 September 2009, DotsFam released the album Zombusiness.

After the album's release, Mikhail Krasnoderevshik and Tyukha founded the 31records studio and the label Kidok Production, where they subsequently released their second album, K.I.D.O.K.. Dimon increasingly moved away from hip-hop in favor of experimental music. In November 2010, Gnom released his debut solo album, featuring DJ Navvy, Dimon, and others.

In June 2011, Rustaveli and Gnome released the album Zerkala, featuring Shiza, Dinice, Marein, Sanches, and others. A music video was shot for the song Osenniy, directed by Mikhail Borodin. Filming took place in the Khovrin Hospital. Track "Kukushka" is a cover version of the song of the same name by Kino.

After the release of Zerkala, Dimon and Gnom left DotsFam and focused on recording M.Squad's second album. Gnom was simultaneously also recording his second solo album.

In 2019, Rustaveli announced plans to record a new DotsFam project featuring Nelegal, Sanches, and White Hot Ice.

==== Mnogotochie Band ====
Mnogotochie Band (originally DotsBand) is a live instrumental group formed by the founders of Mnogotochie. It performs Mnogotochie and original tracks in the style of art-rap.

On 21 December 2011, the single "Beg ot sebya" was released single; at the same time, the band recorder its first album.

The band's second album, Rekviyem po real'nosti, was released on 29 March 2018, consisting of melodic ballads with strong vocal and hard rap features.

Since the end of 2019, Sanches has stopped performing at the band's concerts; according to Rustaveli, this was due to "communication problems as a result of his alcohol consumption." In September 2020, Rustaveli announced that Mnogotochie Band will be put on pause due to COVID-19 and that the band planned to resume its activities in 2021.

== Discography ==
This section does not list solo albums by Rustaveli and other members of the band.

=== Albums ===
==== Studio albums ====
Band	Name	Year
Mnogotochie	Zhizn' i Svoboda	2001
Mnogotochie	Atomy soznaniYA	2002
Tretiy put'	Kusok Zhizni (Pyati Godam Raven...)	2003
Tretiy put'	Burime 12	2004
Dots Family	Fuckt #1	2005
Mnogotochie	Za beskonechnost' Vremeni	2007
«DotsFam»	Zombusiness	2009
«DotsFam»	Zerkala	2011
Mnogotochie Band	Pod asfal'tovym nebom	2014
Mnogotochie Band	Rekviyem po real'nosti	2018

==== Other albums ====
Band	Name	Year	Type
Mnogotochie	Nenomernoy	2003	compilation
Mnogotochie	Vse al'bomy. Chast' 1	2006	compilation
Mnogotochie	Vse al'bomy. Chast' 2	2006	compilation
Mnogotochie	«Favorite»(«Из бранного»)	2008	compilation
Mnogotochie	Territoriya zhelaniy	2013	demo
DotsBand	The Living Truth	2013	mini-album

=== Singles ===
Band	Name	Year
DotsBand	"Beg ot sebya"	2011
DotsBand	"Uletayesh' ty"	2012
DotsBand	"Plach', no tantsuy"	2014
Mnogotochie Band	"Vot i vsyo"	2016
Mnogotochie Band	"Zima"	2017

=== Music videos ===
Band	Track	Year	Filmmaker
DotsFam	"Osenniy"	2011	Mikhail Borodin
DotsBand	"Day ognya!"	2014	Sinegor
Mnogotochie Band	"Vot i vsyo"	2016	Ilya Danilyuk
Mnogotochie Band	"Uchit'sya lyubit'"	2018	Ilya Danilyuk

== Critique ==
On 23 September 2002, the editor of the magazine Vash dosug Leyla Guchmazova wrote in an article about the group:

"Mnogotochie" are poets of the concrete jungle, whom it is better not to meet in dark alleys. The group was formed in 1998 and began to play a mixture of Russian chanson with rap. They are concerned about poverty, drug addiction, and other social issues. The local TV channel "Teleinform" is also concerned about the same thing, but the guys have their own view on the problem. And let them not tell us that the voice of the streets is Rostov's Kasta, when there is such an underground nearby.

On 8 April 2007, Ruslan Munnibaev, writing for Rap.ru, having attended the last Mnogotochie concert, wrote:

There are no promotional materials, not a single photoshoot, not to mention any music videos or other related products, but the halls are still packed all over Russia. They deliberately refused to perform their main hit at concerts. Their banal, almost vulgar lyrics with their concentrated power grind this very banality and vulgarity into folk poetry. It is stupid to talk about their MC skills, because MCing for their work is like making faces, talking about something serious.

In May 2007, Sergey "Sir G" Kurbanov wrote:

A rigidly defended independent opinion, ideas and principles in creativity, on the one hand and an absolute unwillingness to "promote", to become part of the "show business" system, on the other. Mnogotochie became one of the few underground groups who managed to achieve "cult" status and at the same time spread the results of their work so widely across the territory of Russia and the CIS that this very status began to be questioned by some people.

On 24 October 2007, the Sovetskaya molodezh' newspaper wrote:

Mnogotochie acquired the status of "cult" underground performers, despite the fact that they consciously rejected all moves for their own promotion. In general, Mnogotochie fundamentally did not recognize any other ways of popularizing themselves, except through creativity.

The Russian edition of Billboard magazine wrote in 2007:

There has never been another such group in Russian hip-hop. The members of Mnogotochie have done everything “in spite of everything” throughout their entire career. They initially stood in opposition to the “system,” and, nevertheless, achieved success. They avoided any contact with the mass media, but, in spite of this, they found a large and devoted audience. They did not film a single video, yet sold albums and ringtones to the envy of many.

On 3 January 2008. the MK v Pitere newspaper wrote in a review:

Mnogotochie has hardly been played on the radio since the band refused to perform their own hit “V zhizni tak byvayet.” Mnogotochie is not invited to corporate events because Rustaveli “doesn’t want to be a dessert.” Mnogotochie are rare guests on television. There, they prefer to turn a blind eye to Rustaveli’s poems about death, graves, and prison. This doesn’t stop the lead singer from churning out another batch of “black” street rap, which packs clubs in both capitals.

== Soundtracks ==
- 2005 — Dust
- 2006 — Khottabych
