= Vasilisa Volodina =

- Born: Vasilisa Vladimirovna Volodina; April 16, 1974 (age 52); Moscow, USSR
- Occupation: television presenter
- Years active: 1992–present
- Spouse: Sergey Volodin
- Children: Two

Vasilisa Vladimirovna Volodina (Russian: Васили́са Влади́мировна Воло́дина; born April 16, 1974, Moscow) is a host on the Russian television show Let's Get Married since 2008.

She is a Russian astrologer and a TV presenter.
