= The Life of Klim Samgin =

Final and unfinished novel by Maxim Gorky

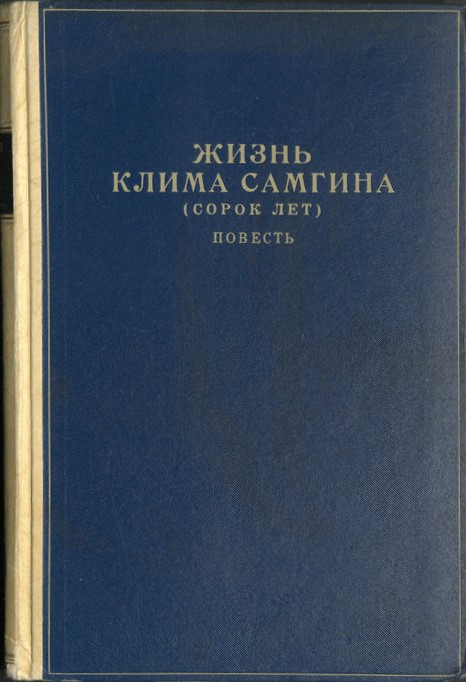
- First edition cover (1927)
- Author: Maxim Gorky
- Original title: Жизнь Клима Самгина
- Language: Russian
- Genre: Philosophical novel, bildungsroman, modernist novel, historical novel
- Publisher: Verlag "Kniga"
- Publication date: 1927–1931; 1937
- Publication place: Italy / Germany / Soviet Union
- English publication date: 1930–1938

The Life of Klim Samgin (Russian: Жизнь Клима Самгина, romanized: Zhizn' Klima Samgina) is a four-volume novel written by Maxim Gorky from 1925 up to his death in 1936. It is Gorky's most ambitious work, intended to depict "all the classes, all the trends, all the tendencies, all the hell-like commotion of the last century, and all the storms of the 20th century." It follows the decline of Russian intelligentsia from the start of the 1870s and the assassination of Alexander II to the 1917 Revolution, seen through the eyes of Klim Samgin, a typical petit-bourgeois intellectual. The fourth and final part is unfinished and abruptly ends with the beginning of the February Revolution, although as seen from Gorky's drafts and fragments, Lenin's return to Russia in April 1917 and Samgin's death may have been intended as the possible ending. It is believed to be the inspiration behind Boris Pasternak's Doctor Zhivago.

The novel received controversial reputation among Gorky's contemporaries, although later it was described as a notable work of 20th-century literature. In English, the four volumes were published in 1930s under the titles Bystander, The Magnet, Other Fires and The Specter; the whole book was referred to as Forty Years: The Life of Clim Samghin, "a tetralogy of novels".

== Reception and criticism ==
Gorky himself thought of the book as a message to future generations (as he said, "the old ones won't like it, while the young ones won't get it") and called it "his only good book", However, it has a controversial reputation in literary criticism, some judging it a typical work of Socialist realism satire, with its "tediousness" and "two-dimensional" characters, and for being "overly tendentious"; others consider it one of the most important works of Russian 20th-century literature (some critics see it as a modernist work).

Joseph Stalin was reluctant about the novel. Milovan Djilas cites his words said in 1948:

I pointed out that I regarded as [Gorky's] greatest work – both in method and in the profundity of its picture of the Russian Revolution – The Life of Klim Samgin. But Stalin disagreed, avoiding the subject of method. "No, his best things are those he wrote earlier: The Town of Okurov, his stories, and Foma Gordeyev. And as far as the picture of the Russian Revolution in Klim Samgin is concerned, there is very little revolution there and only a single Bolshevik – what was his name: Lyutikov? Lyutov?"

I corrected him: "Kutuzov – Lyutov is an entirely different character."

Stalin concluded: "Yes, Kutuzov! The revolution is portrayed from one side, and inadequately at that; and from the literary point of view, too, his earlier works are better."

The reviews of the novel given by Gorky's contemporaries were mixed. For example, the white émigré critic Gleb Struve said that all the parts of the novel suffered from compositional problems. On the other hand, Boris Pasternak after reading the first part was "struck by Gorky's emphasis on the decisive role of the intelligentsia in the revolution, his understanding of its broad national character transcending caste and class divisions". Furthermore, in a letter to Gorky, Pasternak noted its poetic features (see below) and gave a favorable estimate of the novel because it was close to his own views on the contemporary epic. He also praised the novel's complexity because it "forced the reader to make an effort to follow Samgin's growth and development".

Marc Slonim, also a white émigré critic, described the book in 1958 as "an artistic failure", a "fragmentary and shapeless work", while Andrei Sinyavsky wrote a dissertation about the novel, in which, while keeping to the standards of the "political consciousness" that Soviet dissertations required, he also defended Gorky's style and described the novel's poetics and its formal elements, including its polyphony, this being uncharacteristic of Soviet criticism of Gorky's work.

After the first volume came out in English in 1930, the reviews were mixed. VQR criticized the novel for "ignor[ing] the demands for reality of character" and compared it to Ann Veronica by H. G. Wells, as Wells also "ha[s] no artistic community with the novelist as an artist" as Gorky "is concerned with the presentation of 'the young intellectual' of before the Revolution... and all the problems which it suggests, just as Ann Veronica is the type outline, not the individual story, of a young woman rebel." On the other hand, Alexander Kaun left a favourable review in the Saturday Review and wrote that it is not a historical novel, but an "immediate" and "kaleidoscopic" "panorama" that represents "discomfort of contemporary Russians who lived in the chaos of an unduly protracted period of storm and stress."

The novel was praised by Brian Howard. Gorky's "insight into the paralysis of the doomed intellectual" appealed to him, and in his 1938 review of the novel he called Samgin, the main character, "so universal, and so very contemporary", "almost ideally representative intellectual of our time", in whom Gorky "so thoroughly" "explored the whole intellectual and historical panorama, that he has created". "What Gork[y] intended was to expose the paralysis that attacks the majority of intellectuals when once they realise that the system in which they live is doomed", Howard wrote, "and he has succeeded so well that [the novel] seems to include portraits of a great many people one knows."

Richard Freeborn wrote in 1985:

As a revolutionary epic Gorky's The Life of Klim Samgin has the dignity of flawed literary monument ... by its incompleteness and shapelessness. But it is the dignity of the work that even in its failure it demands respect, and that dignity is due to the sustaining talkativeness of so many dozens of characters ... so that it literally seems to recreate in its cacophonous way a picture of Russian intellectual history before 1917...

== Style and literary significance ==
The supportive critics appreciate the novel for its laconic, experimental and eclectic style, which combines different cultural traditions and literary styles. It is also noted that, unlike Gorky's previous works, known for their traditional style of the realist novel, Klim Samgin differs with poetics, close to Russian avant-garde. Richard Freeborn also finds the novel notable for its polyphony, created by a "multi-faceted, multi-voiced kaleidoscope of social types", by "talkativeness of so many dozens of characters". As he also says, Gorky represents Russian life "as dominated by identity-seekers who create mirror images of each other, who are duplicates or doubles in a fictional replica of history".

Boris Pasternak wrote that the novel is remarkable for space, showered "with moving color," dammed up "with crowding details," "the essence of history, which lies in the chemical regeneration of each of its moments" and communicated "with the forcefulness of suggestion".

The Life of Klim Samgin, despite the interpretation of the official Soviet critic as the work of Socialist Realism, is found by some critics in many ways similar to such modernist masterpieces as Thomas Mann's The Magic Mountain (1924) and Robert Musil's The Man Without Qualities (1930–1943). For example, French critic Philippe Chardin in his study Le roman de la conscience dangereuse analyzes Samgin in the series of nine works, including well-known modernist novels. German scholar Armin Knigge also finds it in many ways similar to modernist novels from Chardin's study, such as Zeno's Conscience (1923), In Search of Lost Time (1913—1927), The Magic Mountain and The Man Without Qualities. In some studies, such as P. Cioni's and Ralf Schroder's, Gorky's novel is directly defined as a modernist work and a "negative epic", peculiar, according to Schroder, to Mann, Joyce and Proust. Schroder writes: "In Samgin Gorky embodies a specifically modernist theme of contradiction between the post-bourgeois reality and the dogmatic pre-bourgeois picture of the world, and also the resulting modernist destruction of this picture. That's why the ideological and artistic complex of Samgin includes not only a parody of a 19th-century young man's story, but also a negative epic".

Mikhail Bakhtin and Georgy Gachev saw The Life of Klim Samgin as a carnivalesque work, "an expression of... internalized carnival". Bakhtin said that "there may not be much festivity and joy there, but still – we are presented with a parade of masks... There are no individual faces."

== Portrayal of the Revolution ==
One of the reasons of Stalin's rejection of the novel (see above) was the little role of the Bolsheviks in the novel. Bolsheviks are represented by a group of minor characters headed by Stepan Kutuzov. According to the official Soviet criticism, which portrayed Gorky as the "founder of Socialist Realism", Kutuzov is the main positive character, a "bearer of the true scientific views and a propagandist of the great truth of 20th century", and he opposes Samgin's bourgeois individualism. Modern critics think that Gorky's portrayal of Revolution is rather ambivalent, and Kutuzov's positivity is questioned. Richard Freeborn and Alexandra Smith also view Kutuzov as the positive character and the bearer of 'the heroism of a labourer, of a craftsman of revolution', to whom Gorky sympathizes with his attempts to influence the course of history. However, Freeborn denies the positivity of the Revolution itself: "But essential in any estimate of his ambivalent, uncommitted, deeply sceptical view of things is the paradox of the novel as a whole ... As a result, the novel invites scrutiny as an anti-epic, or as an epic of an anti-hero, with an implication that the revolution itself deserves the same sceptical dethronement in terms of life's values and priorities as does the unrevolutionary hero."

Kutuzov's positive role was also questioned.

Fyodor Gladkov, Gorky's contemporary who later became "the classic of Socialist realism", in a letter to Gorky wrote that "the characteristic "vein" of 90s—1900s was not this Samgin's hamletism (was there a boy or not?), and not the abstract and groundless kutusovism, but the stubborn, living, rebellious power that you had portrayed in Mother..." Gladkov's opinion was close to the reviews left by the Soviet RAPP critics, who criticized the novel for lack of the revolutionary spirit and wrote that Gorky "sees the world through Samgin's eyes".

Mikhail Bakhtin said that Gorky "had a negative attitude towards [Kutuzov]": "He is such a dry character. He is a singer, but his singing lacks feeling. It's all a formality to him. And, in general, he doesn't really understand people."

Armin Knigge notes that by showing Kutuzov through Samgin's eyes, who dislikes Kutuzov and makes a negative characteristic of him, Gorky not only ironically presents Samgin, but "also expresses his solidarity with him in a certain way". He also argues that Kutuzov's role of a revolutionary leader "is also contradicted by the fact that he rarely appears in the foreground of the action", and that the revolutionary pathos doesn't become the dominating spirit of the novel, as although there are many sincere revolutionaries portrayed, "the community of revolutionaries does not appear as a powerful movement, nor as the well-organized avant-garde of such a movement, but rather as a circle of believers and self-sacrificing supporters of an idea" who represent "a small minority" in the depicted society.

== English translation ==
The first volume was translated by Bernard Guilbert Guerney, a translator whose translation of Nikolai Gogol's Dead Souls Vladimir Nabokov would later praise as "an extraordinarily fine piece of work", and published in 1930 under the title Bystander, while the other three were translated by theatre critic Alexander Bakshy as The Magnet (Volume II, published in 1931), Other Fires (Volume III, published in 1933) and The Specter (the unfinished final fourth volume, published in 1938). The whole work was referred as Forty Years: The Life of Clim Samghin and labeled as a "tetralogy of novels". After that, the translation of Guerney and Bakshy was never reissued, and there were no other attempts to translate the novel; Aaron Lake Smith wrote in Lapham's Quarterly that "Gorky's work is so unavailable that it's almost suspicious, as if there might still be a wizened Cold Warrior clanking away in a basement office somewhere in Washington... Why have there been no reissues?"

Despite that the first volume is divided only into five lengthy chapters and the rest of the novel takes the form of uninterrupted narrative, it is divided into strict short chapters in the translation.

== Screen adaptation ==
The novel was turned into the eponymous TV series by Viktor Titov in 1988.
