= Larisa Guzeyeva =

Soviet-Russian actress and television host

- Лариса Гузеева
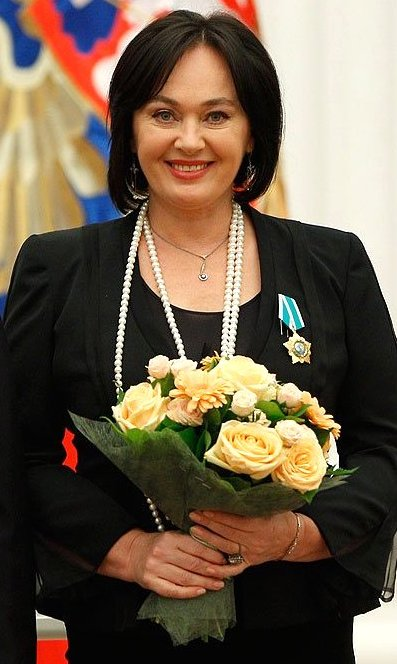
- Guzeyeva in 2011
- Born: Larisa Andreyevna Guzeyeva; 23 May 1959 (age 67); Burtinskoe, Belyayevsky District, Orenburg Oblast, RSFSR, USSR
- Occupations: Actress, television host

Larisa Andreyevna Guzeyeva (Russian: Лари́са Андре́евна Гузе́ева; born 23 May 1959) is a Soviet and Russian theater and film actress and television host. She is a Meritorious Artist of Russia and honored artist of the Russian Federation in 1994. She is a member of the public organization "Union of Cinematographers of the Russian Federation". She was awarded the Order of Friendship of the Russian Federation in 2011.

== Biography ==
=== Life and career ===
Larisa Andreevna Guzeeva was born May 23, 1959, in the village of Burtinsky of Belyayevsky District, Orenburg Oblast. Her mother was Albina Andreevna Guzeeva, a school teacher.

In 1984 she graduated from the Russian State Institute of Performing Arts, course of Vladimir Petrov.

At the end of the institute, she began acting in films. Her first major role was Larissa Ogudalova in the film Eldar Ryazanov's A Cruel Romance (1984).

In 1985, films with the participation of the actress Let's Meet in the Metro (Lelya Varshavskaya), Contenders (Natalya Ozernikova), Strangers Do Not Go Here (Natasha Ulanova) appeared on the screens.

Between 1986 and 1990 Guzeeva was an actress of the Lenfilm studio.

She starred in such films as The Twentieth Century Approaches (1986, Henri Furne), The Secret Fairway (1986, Victoria Mezentseva), The Mysterious Prisoner (1986, Larissa Rosseti), The White Curse (1987, Nadezhda Sergeevna), Anna Petrovna (1989, Anna Petrovna in her youth), SC. Sleeping Carriage (1989, Evgenia Vorobyova), the series The life of Klim Samgin (1986-1988), etc.

In the 1990s, films featuring Guzeeva's included Chosen One (1991), Sentence (1994), House (1995).

In the 2000s, the actress starred in the series Maroseika, 12 (2000), The Heirs (2001, 2005), Do not Leave Me, Love (2001), Tanker Tango (2006), Anakop (2009), the films Graffiti (2005), Family Supper (2006).

In later years, Guzeeva starred in the drama The Bell (2010), the series Three Comrades (2012).

=== Television host ===
Host of the Channel One, Let's Get Married. Permanent member of the jury in the 6th season of the Channel One program Minuta slavy.

=== Personal life ===
Larisa Guzeeva was married several times. Currently her husband is Igor Bukharov, President of the Federation of Restaurateurs and Hoteliers of Russia, owner of the restaurant "Nostalgie". The actress has a son Georgiy and daughter Olga.

In 2019, Guzeyeva candidly opened up that she was an alcoholic.

In September 2021, Guzeeva was diagnosed with a COVID-19. She was admitted to City Clinical Hospital No. 40.

== Filmography ==
=== Film ===
- 1979 The Meeting Place Cannot Be Changed (4th series) as Girl dancing with Taraskin in a restaurant
- 1984 A Cruel Romance as Larisa Ogudalova
- 1985 Rivals as Natalia Ozyornikova
- 1985 Strangers Do Not Go Here as Natasha Ulanova
- 1986 The Twentieth Century Approaches as Ma'am Anry Furnie
- 1986 Secret channel (Mini-series) as Victoria Mezentseva
- 1986 Mysterious prisoner as Larisa Rosseti
- 1988 The life of Klim Samgin (TV series) as Elizaveta Spivak
- 1990 The Executioner as Sveta
- 1996 Theatre Chekhonte. Pictures from the recent past as Anna Pavlovna Sharamykina
- 2002 Women's logic as Elena Drozdova
- 2005 Order as Galya
- 2006 Graffiti (film) as Mariya
- 2006 Family dinner as Irina

=== TV ===
- 2006 Yeralash - Episode 200 (second sketch) ~ Hot Potato
- 2008–present Let's Get Married — host
- 2011-2014 Minute of Fame — jury member

== Criticism ==
A reporter at Komsomolskaya Pravda ("KP") argued that the talk show that Guzeyeva currently hosts, Let's Get Married, has devious tricks:

"The founders of this project had a good purpose in mind – to connect lonely people. But now there are many devious tricks. There now is an atmosphere of bargaining. The "bride" and "groom" advisers – friends and family have with their advice destroyed more than one strong family. As a result those unfortunate individuals who are trying to find a mate go home empty handed. In an attempt to find happiness, they become just a commodity.

Darya Volga explained how she felt that Guzeyeva would ask a woman who had two abortion how did it feel to kill two of her children:

"I led three months of the program, and then the management decided to drastically change the format to make it more outrageous. Several times I refused to articulate those things that I was asked to do by the editors. For example, a woman of 55 came onto the program, who wanted to meet the man. In her youth she had had two abortions, after which could not become a mother, in earphone editor says: "Ask her how she feels after killing two of her children?" I did not repeat it. How can I, a young, healthy, successful, married woman, give a backhand to a woman who already has had a hard life? Larisa Guzeeva can. She is more mature, experienced, tough. I can not watch "Let's Get Married!" in its current version..."

On June 5, 2019, Russian blogger Alexei Navalny released a video, in which he accused Larisa Guzeeva of purchasing an apartment on Sadovnicheskaya embankment worth 90 million rubles for 1/10 of the price. Alexei also noted that the low cost of the apartment was promoted by the mayor of Moscow, Sergei Sobyanin, for whom Guzeeva urged to vote. The newspaper Komsomolskaya Pravda, without mentioning Navalny's investigation, reported that Guzeeva had been harassed on the Internet and was accused of misbehavior and the use of a living space that she allegedly received as a gift.
