= Let's Get Married =

Let's Get Married may refer to:

== Film ==
- Let's Get Married (1926 film), an American film starring Richard Dix
- Let's Get Married (1931 film), a French comedy film directed by Louis Mercanton
- Let's Get Married (1937 film), an American film starring Ida Lupino
- Let's Get Married (1960 film), a 1960 British comedy drama
- Let's Get Married (2015 film), a 2015 Chinese romance film
- Let's Get Married (2023 film), an Indian Tamil-language romantic drama film

== Song ==
- "Let's Get Married" (Jagged Edge song), 1999
- "Let's Get Married" (The Proclaimers song)
- "Let's Get Married", a song by Al Green from Livin' for You
- "Let's Get Married", a song by Bleachers from Gone Now
- "Let's Get Married", a song by Miley Cyrus from Bass Persuades
- "Let's Get Married", a song from the Trolls Band Together (soundtrack)

== Television ==
- Let's Get Married (TV series), a Russian television program on Channel One
- Let's Get Married (spelprogramma), a Dutch gameshow
