= Graffiti (film) =

- Russian: Граффити
- Directed by: Igor Apasyan
- Produced by: Gevorg Nersisyan
- Starring: Andrei Novikov; Viktor Perevalov; Sergey Potapov; Larisa Guzeeva; Aleksandr Ilyin; Olga Yurasova
- Release date: 2006
- Country: Russia
- Language: Russian

Graffiti (Russian: Граффити) is a 2006 Russian comedy-drama film directed by Igor Apasyan.

== Plot ==
The film tells about an artist doing his favorite thing. He is painting graffiti on the walls of the metropolitan subway. Suddenly, bikers attack him, as a result of which he loses a trip to Italy. Instead, he goes to paint in the province, where he expects a lot of new adventures.

== Cast ==
- Andrei Novikov as Andrey Dragunov
- Viktor Perevalov as Klizya
- Sergey Potapov as Mityay
- Larisa Guzeeva as Mariya
- Aleksandr Ilyin as Miron Sysoevich
- Olga Yurasova as Hostes in hotel
