= Khottabych =

}{0ТТ@БЬ)Ч / Khottabych
- 2006 cover of the film
- Directed by: Pyotr Tochilin
- Written by: Pyotr Tochilin (screenplay); Veronica Voznyak; Sergey Klado (book)
- Produced by: Sergey Selyanov
- Starring: Marius Jampolskis; Vladimir Tolokonnikov; Julia Paranova; Mark Geykhman; Liva Kruminya
- Cinematography: Vladimir Zapasov; Victor Zubarev; Igor Grinjakin
- Edited by: Valery Feodorovich
- Music by: Dmytro Shurov
- Distributed by: STV Film Company, Mill
- Release date: 10 August 2006
- Running time: 92 minutes
- Country: Russia
- Languages: English, Russian
- Budget: N/A
- Box office: US$1,382,450 (Russia)

Khottabych (Russian: Хоттабыч, Hottabych, stylized as }{0ТТ@БЬ)Ч) is a 2006 Russian fantasy comedy film by STV Film Company. It is based on the novel The Copper Jar of Old Khottabych by Sergey Oblomov, (pen name of Sergey Klado)) and uses the title character, genie Khottabych, created by Soviet writer Lazar Lagin for his children's book with the same title and movie Old Khottabych (1956). It opened in theaters on 10 August 2006 at Karoprokat.

== Plot ==
Gena Ryzhov is a young hacker obsessed with computers and the Internet. His girlfriend leaves him because of his miserly lifestyle. Attempting to mend his relationship with his girlfriend, he buys an ancient jug from an online auction and finds a genie residing in it, who offers him three wishes. First, the genie, named Khottabych by Gena, prints a huge number of US$100 banknotes. As Hottabych is not familiar with modern paper, the banknotes are printed on papyrus. This later sets off a chain of events leading back to Gena.

Unbeknownst to him, the local mafia is aware of Gena's skills and is intent on forcing him to gain entrance to bank computers. Furthermore, the Russian and American police forces are attempting to locate him because of his recent activity on the Internet. The Americans send a female hacker named Annie to trick Gena into revealing himself, which he does. After a rocky start to their relationship, romance ensues.

Things are further complicated by an evil genie named Shaitanych who is also hunting for the jar, in an attempt to collect all 13 genie-vessels and gain dominion over Earth, so no dreams may be ever fulfilled. After Khottabych grants Gena's final wish, he decides to become a mortal man and is subsequently killed by Shaitanych. Left with nothing but a strand of Hottabych's hair, Gena and Annie decode his DNA and upload the binary code into the Internet, where a final battle takes place between Hottabych and Shaitanych.

== Cast ==
- Khottabych - Vladimir Tolokonnikov
- Gena - Marius Jampolskis
- Annie - Līva Krūmiņa
- Shaytanych - Mark Geykhman
- Lena - Julia Paranova
- Alisa Sezeneova - Mila Lipner
- Venick - Grigory Skryapnik
- Oleg - Alexander Ovchinnikov
- Alexander - Yuriy Dumchev
- Employees of FSB - Konstantin Spassky and Rostislav Krokhin

== Music score, lyrics, songs ==
- "Pochuty", "Super-puper", "Beta-karotin", "Gajki s Jamajki" by Boombox music group;
- "Spionskaya" - Spy theme music by Dmytro Shurov;
- "The Number" by Psoy Korolenko;
- "Cloun" written by T. Kosonen, A. Korvumak, T. Leppanen; performed by Aavikko;
- "Vladimirskij central" by Mikhail Krug;
- "Amerika" by Mnogotochie;
- "Sljuna", "Sljuna", "Shajtan Shajtanych" by Uratsakidogi;
- "Morjak" by Artjom Rukavichkin;
- "Kukla kolduna" by Korol' i Shut.

== Video release ==
The film was released by Soyuz Video (Russian: Союз Видео) on VHS and DVD in August 2006 without subtitles, and also on PAL DVD-editions by Karoprokat with subtitles and the trailer of the film. In the United States and Canada, it was released on VHS and DVD without subtitles and with English simultaneous interpretation on system NTSC in September.

The aspect ratio of the movie is 16:9 (1.85:1).
