= Darya Volga =

Russian television personality (born 1974)

Daria Volga
- Born: Daria Volodymyrivna Volga; 19 June 1974 (age 52); Kyiv
- Awards: Best director and best film nomination for the director’s debut ‘Water’, international Film Festival MOLODIST

Darya Vladimirovna Volga (Ukrainian: Дар’я Володимирівна Волга, also known as Dasha Volga) (born June 19, 1974, Kyiv) is a Ukrainian TV and film personality. She was the original host for Russia's Let's Get Married on Channel One. Since the annexation of Crimea in 2014 moved her projects to Ukraine.

== Career ==
In New Zealand, Volga starred in the television series appeared on the television show Rude Awakenings, and was the star in Beyond the Ocean, as well as several commercials.

In Russia, Volga first appeared as a weather forecaster on TNT. Volga gained popularity by filming on the series St. Petersburg Secrets, Maroseyka, 12, Tatiana's Day and the French film Lisa Alisa (The Fox Alisa).

From July 28 to October 3, 2008, she was the head presenter of Let's Get Married.

== Selected filmography ==
- 1994 — St. Petersburg Secrets as Masha Chechevinskaya
- 1995 — What a Wonderful Game as Yulya
- 2007 — Tatiana's Day as Galina Rybkina (TV series)
- 2010 — Yefrosinya as Tatiana (TV series)
- 2013 — Zemsky Doctor as Liza Martynova (TV series)
- 2019 - ´Water’ -writer and director (short film, Ukraine)
- 2022- ‘Suri’- writer and director (short film, Ukraine)
- 2022- ´Pokut’ as Vika (feature film, Ukraine)
- 2026- as Svetlana in Brokenwood Mysteries (New Zealand)

== Personal life ==
In 1995, Volga graduated from the VGIK. In 2001 she moved with her husband to New Zealand. In 2003, Volga graduated from the Directing Department of the University of Auckland and holds a Master of Arts. She has 3 children.
