= Heart of a Dog =

1925 satirical novel by Mikhail Bulgakov

- First English edition
- Author: Mikhail Bulgakov
- Original title: Собачье сердце
- Language: Russian
- Genre: Satire science fiction
- Publisher: Harcourt Brace (English)
- Publication date: 1968
- Publication place: USSR
- English publication date: 1968
- Media type: Print (hardback and paperback)
- OCLC: 816041597
- Dewey Decimal: 812/.54 19
- LC Class: PS3556.E42 E4 1990

Heart of a Dog (Russian: Собачье сердце, romanized: Sobach'ye serdtse, IPA: [sɐˈbatɕjɪ ˈsʲertsə]) is a novella by Russian author Mikhail Bulgakov. A biting satire of Bolshevism, it was written in 1925 at the height of the New Economic Policy, a period during which communism appeared to be relaxing in the Soviet Union. It is generally interpreted as an allegory of the communist revolution and "the revolution's misguided attempt to radically transform mankind". Its publication was initially prohibited in the Soviet Union, but it circulated in samizdat until it was officially released in the country in 1987. It was almost immediately adapted into a movie, which was aired in late 1988 on First Channel of Soviet Television, was widely praised and attracted many readers to the original Bulgakov text. Since then, the novella has become a cultural phenomenon in Russia, known and discussed by people "from schoolchildren to politicians". It was filmed in Russian and Italian language versions, and was adapted in English as a play and an opera.

== Background ==
The book was rejected for publication in 1925, due in part to the influence of Lev Kamenev, then a leading Party official. Bulgakov subsequently wrote a play based on the story in 1926 for the Moscow Art Theater. However, the play was cancelled after the manuscript and copies were confiscated by the secret police, or OGPU. Eventually, Maxim Gorky intervened to get the manuscript returned.

The story was published in the Soviet Union only in 1987, more than 60 years after its completion, but was made known to Russian readers via samizdat. In 1968, it was published in English by Harvill Press, translated by Michael Glenny.

One suggestion for the real life prototype for Professor Preobrazhensky is a Russian surgeon Serge Voronoff who was famous for his experiments on implanting humans with animal's testicles and thyroid glands, though there were others who did similar work. Another suggestion is professor Vasily Preobrazhensky, who headed the St. Petersburg Institute of Obstetrics and Gynecology at the time the novella was written. His first scientific publication was about the transplantation of ovaries to males. Like the fictional professor, he "did not like the proletariat", and possibly for this he was banished to Arkhangelsk, where he continued his work, including transplants of ovaries, with a hearsay report of short-term rejuvenation effect.

== Plot ==
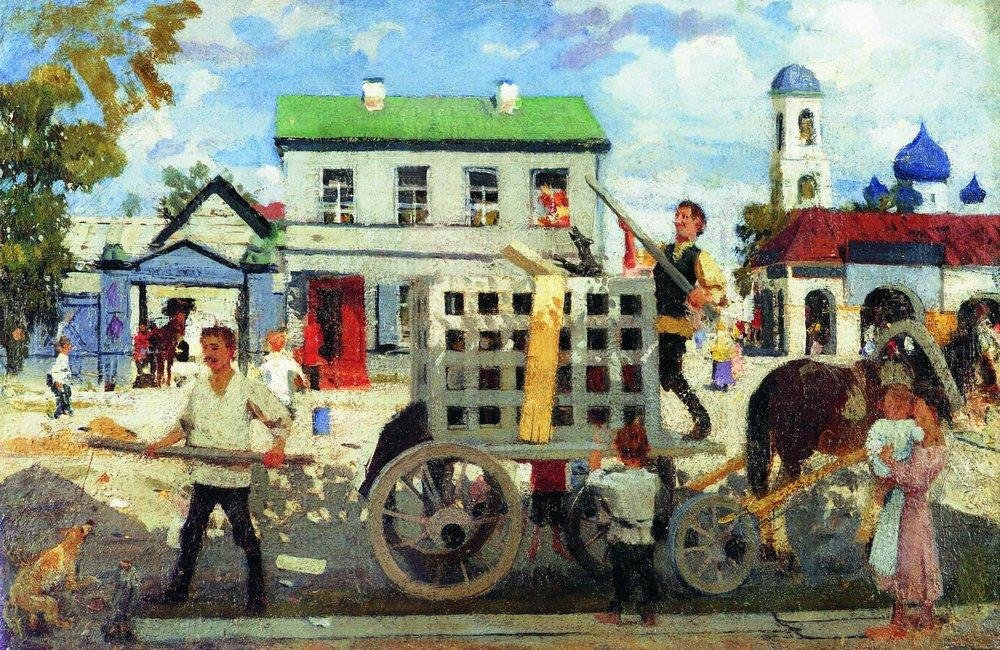
Catching Stray Dogs, a 1920s painting by Boris Kustodiev

In Moscow in 1924, foraging for trash one winter day causes a stray dog to be found by a cook and to be scalded with boiling water. Lying forlorn in a doorway, the dog awaits his end awash in self-pity. To his surprise, a successful surgeon, Filipp Filippovich Preobrazhensky, arrives and offers the dog a piece of sausage. Overjoyed, the dog follows Filipp back to his flat, where he is given the name of Sharik (meaning little ball). The dog finds that ironic, as he sees Sharik fit for a pampered fat dog.

At the house, Sharik gets to know Dr. Preobrazhensky's household, which includes Doctor Ivan Arnoldovich Bormenthal (the professor's student and protégé) and two female servants: maid Zinaida Prokofievna Bunina and cook Darya Petrovna Ivanova. Despite the professor's vocal anti-communism, his frequent medical treatment of the RCP(b) leadership makes him untouchable. As a result, he refuses to decrease his seven-room flat and treats the Bolsheviks on the housing committee, led by Schwonder, with unveiled contempt. Impressed by his new master, Sharik slips easily into the role of "a gentleman's dog".

After several days, one of the servants begins taking Sharik for walks through Moscow. Preening in his new collar, Sharik is unmoved by the taunts of a passing stray. After his health improves, the professor at last reveals his real intentions for taking in Sharik. As Filip's laboratory is prepared, he locks Sharik in the bathroom.

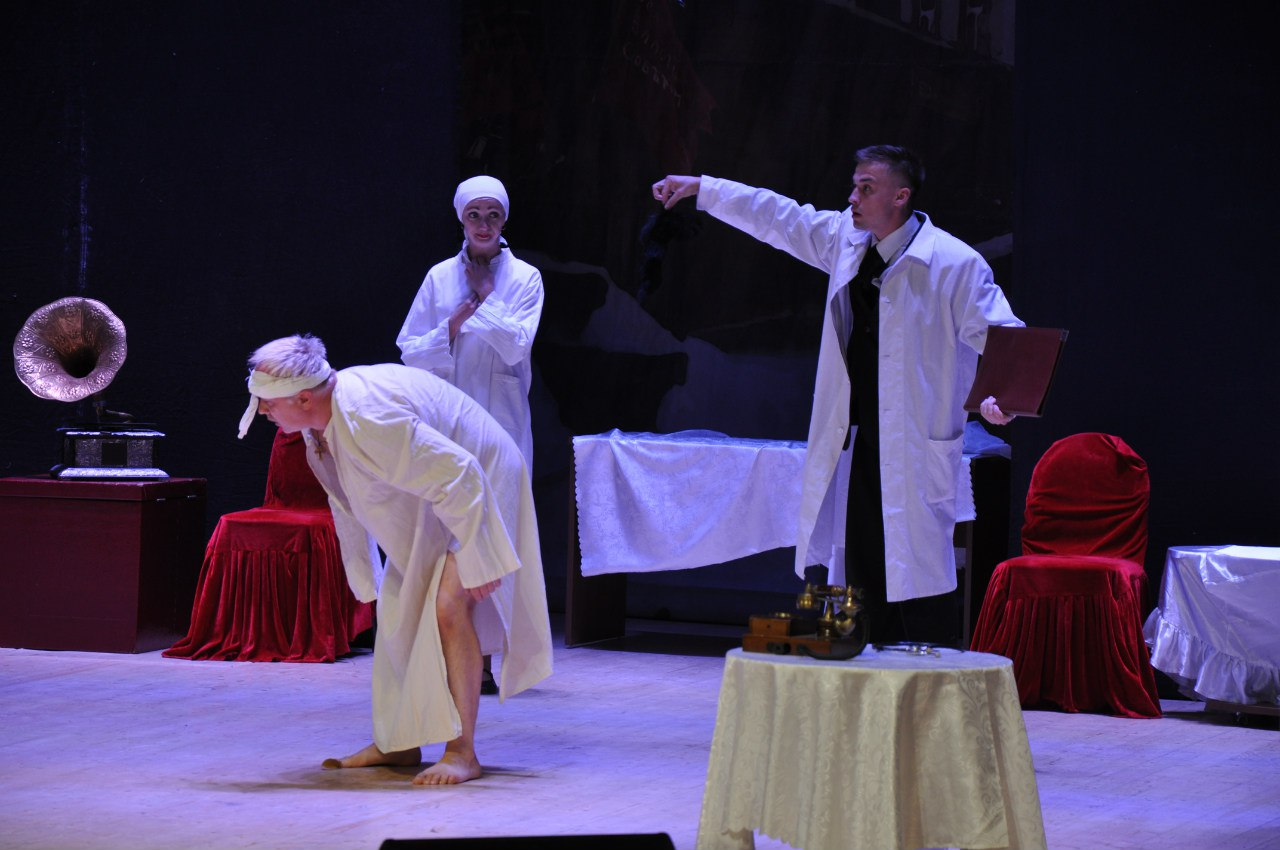
Sharik awakens from the operation, in a 2015 stage production of the story

As a seething Sharik plots to destroy Filipp's stuffed owl again, the door opens and he is dragged by the skin of his neck into the lab. There, he is sedated and an operation begins. As Bormenthal assists, the Professor trepans Sharik's skull and gives him a human pituitary gland. Sharik's torso is also opened, and he is given human testicles. The organs were cut from Klim Grigorievich Chugunkin, who was killed in a brawl and was repeatedly a thief, an alcoholic and a bully. Only repeated injections of adrenaline prevent the dog from dying on the operating table.

The story then shifts from being told from the perspective of Sharik to being told from the perspective of Bormenthal by his notes on the case and then finally to a third-person perspective.

During the weeks after the operation, the household is stunned, as Sharik begins transforming into an incredibly unkempt and at first primitive human. After building an alliance with Schwonder, the former canine is granted papers under the absurd name "Poligraf Poligrafovich Sharikov". Preobrazhensky wanted to pick a name from his Orthodox Christian calendar, and Sharik instead picked the publisher name, "Poligraf", which in Russian is the root of several words related to printing art and technology.

In the aftermath, the Professor and Bormenthal patiently attempt to teach Sharikov basic etiquette. Instead, Sharikov mocks manners as a relic of Tsarism. He insists that it is better to behave "naturally". As a result, Sharikov curses in front of women, refuses to shave, dresses in unwashed clothing and eats like a complete slob.

Meanwhile, Sharikov progressively turns the professor's life into a living hell. One day, he accidentally turns on the spigot while he chases a cat. With the bathroom door locked and Sharikov unable to unlock it, the entire apartment is flooded. Later, he is caught in an attempt to sexually assault maid Zina. Enraged, Bormenthal repeatedly hits Sharikov and forces him to apologize. Infuriated, Sharikov leaves the apartment and remains gone for several days.

Later, Bormenthal begs the professor for permission to dose and kill Sharikov with arsenic and calls him a "man with the heart of a dog". The professor is horrified and orders Bormenthal not to "slander the dog". He explains that the human body parts, which came from a homeless drunkard with Bolshevik sympathies, are responsible for all of Sharikov's defects. Bormenthal then suggests that they redo the operation by using the body of a genius. Again the Professor refuses, explaining that the operation was meant to improve the human race. Breaking with his former beliefs, the professor admits that any peasant woman could give birth to a genius and that eugenics are therefore a waste of time. In conclusion, the professor refuses to permit Sharikov's murder or to undo the operation, which could easily kill him as well.

Sharikov soon returns, explaining that he has been granted a job by the Soviet government. He now spends his workday catching and strangling stray cats. The party, he says, is turning them into cheap fur coats for the working class. Soon, Sharikov brings home a female coworker Vasnetsova, whom he introduces to the professor as his common law wife.

Instead of giving them their own room, as Sharikov demands, the professor takes the woman aside and explains that Sharikov is the product of a lab experiment gone horribly wrong. Vasnetsova has been told that Sharikov was maimed fighting Admiral Alexander Kolchak's White Army in Siberia. Upon learning the truth, she leaves the apartment in tears. Seething with hatred, Sharikov vows to have her fired. Again, Bormenthal beats up Sharikov and makes him promise not to do anything of that sort.

The following day, a senior party official, patient and good friend of Professor Preobrazhensky, Pyotr Alexandrovich, arrives and informs the professor that Sharikov has denounced him to the secret police or OGPU. Explaining that nothing is going to happen to him because the government distrusts Sharikov, the party official departs. When Sharikov returns, the professor and Bormenthal order him to leave the flat permanently. Instead, Sharikov refuses and draws a revolver. Enraged, the professor and Bormenthal pounce upon him.

That night, an ominous silence reigns in the flat, and the lights are left on for many hours after bedtime. Over the days that follow, the Professor and Bormenthal look far more relaxed than at any time before Sharikov's arrival. Eventually, the police arrive and are escorted by a beaming Schwonder.

Bearing a search warrant, they demand the professor and Bormenthal to produce Sharikov on pain of immediate arrest. Unintimidated, the professor orders Bormenthal to summon Sharikov, who is changing back into a dog. The professor explains the change as a natural phenomenon, but it is obvious to the reader that he and Bormenthal have simply reversed the operation. Followed by the now-apoplectic Schwonder, the police depart.

In the aftermath, the fully-canine Sharik blissfully resumes his status as a gentleman's dog. However, in the ending of the book, he describes the professor to be bringing home a human brain and removing the pituitary gland. That perhaps shows that Sharik retains some memories of his time as a human or that the professor intends to carry out a similar experiment.

== Themes ==
The novella has been interpreted both as a satire on Bolshevism and as a criticism of eugenics. One commonly accepted interpretation is that Bulgakov was trying to show all the inconsistencies of the system in which Sharikov, a man with a dog's intelligence, could become an important part. Sharik is seen as "a reincarnation of the repellent proletarian", and the professor represents a "hyperbolic vision of the bourgeois dream", according to J. A. E. Curtis.

Names figure prominently in the story. Preobrazhensky's name is derived from the Russian word for "transfiguration". "Sharik" is a common name for dogs in Russia and means "little ball".

The name and patronymic "Poligraf Poligrafovich" echoes a tradition of nonsense double names in Russian literature that goes back to Nikolai Gogol's heroes Akakii Akakievich in "The Overcoat" and Pifagor Pifagorovich in "The Carriage". The name is also a satire on new naming conventions in the early Soviet Union. Nevertheless, the name was chosen following the Russian tradition of "consulting the calendar", with Poligraf's name day being March 4. The name Poligraf has many possible meanings, including a printing process used for calendars.

The name of the donor of the human implants, who is an alcoholic and bum, is Chugunkin ("chugun" is cast iron), which can be seen as parody on the name of Stalin ("stal" is steel).

== Adaptations ==
=== Film ===
The story was filmed in Italian in a 1976 Italian-German comedy film Cuore di cane and starred Max von Sydow as Preobrazhensky.

A 1988 Soviet movie of the same name was made (in sepia) by Vladimir Bortko. A number of sequences in the movie were shot from an unusually low dog's point of view.

=== Play ===
In March 2024, Heart of a Dog was staged at the University of Leeds, directed by James Ahearne and Matthew Beaumont.

=== Musical ===
A new musical adaptation of Heart of a Dog was developed in Australia and was to premiere in May 2013, written by Jim McGrath, composed by Marc Robertson and directed by Nick Byrne.

=== Opera ===
A comic opera The Murder of Comrade Sharik by William Bergsma (1973) is based on the plot of the story.

In 2007, Guerilla Opera staged the premiere of Heart of a Dog, an opera by Rudolf Rojahn, directed by Sally Stunkel. In 2010, the second production was directed by Copeland Woodruff.

In 2010 De Nederlandse Opera staged the premiere of A Dog's Heart, an opera composed by Alexander Raskatov, directed by Simon McBurney. This was staged again by the Opéra de Lyon in January 2014.

== See also ==
- 1925 in science fiction
- Bulgakov museum in Moscow
- Mikhail Bulgakov Museum
- The Master and Margarita
- Homo Sovieticus
- The Island of Doctor Moreau
