= Let's Get Married (TV series) =

- Presented by: Larisa Guzeeva; Vasilisa Volodina / Tamara Globa; Rosa Syabitova
- Country of origin: Russia
- Original language: Russian
- No. of seasons: 9

Production
- Running time: 52 minutes

Original release
- Network: Channel One Russia
- Release: July 28, 2008 – present

Let's Get Married (Давай поженимся, Davay Pozhenimsya: literally "Let's Marry") is a Russian dating program that premiered on Channel One Russia on July 28, 2008. It airs Monday to Thursday at 6:45 pm.

A man or a woman chooses between three potential partners, with the assistance from family and friends present in the studio.

== Format ==
Each episode shows one "hero" or "heroine" who is offered a choice of three potential "love candidates" who all meet the requirements of the "hero" or "heroine". He or she can alternatively meet with any of the three candidates. At the end of the program the hero or heroine decides with which candidate he or she would like to have a relationship.

Two friends and relatives can come on the show and play the role of the "matchmakers" and advisers. They actively help the hero to make a choice – studying them meticulously and asking candidates tricky questions.

== Criticism ==
A reporter at Komsomolskaya Pravda ("KP") argued that this talk show created an atmosphere of bargaining:

"The founders of this project had a good purpose in mind – to connect lonely people. But now there are many devious tricks. There now is an atmosphere of bargaining. The "bride" and "groom" advisers – friends and family have with their advice destroyed more than one strong family. As a result those unfortunate individuals who are trying to find a mate go home empty handed. In an attempt to find happiness, they become just a commodity.

Darya Volga who started the program stated:

"I led three months of the program, and then the management decided to drastically change the format to make it more outrageous. Several times I refused to articulate those things that I was asked to do by the editors. For example, a woman of 55 came onto the program, who wanted to meet the man. In her youth she had had two abortions, after which could not become a mother, in earphone editor says: "Ask her how she feels after killing two of her children?" I did not repeat it. How can I, a young, healthy, successful, married woman, blast a woman who already has had a hard life? However Larisa Guzeeva can; she is more mature, experienced and tough. I find it impossible to watch "Let's Get Married!" in its current version where the hosts try to destroy their heroines..."

== History ==
- In its first year, from July 28 – October 3, 2008 Darya Volga was the main television presenter.
- On October 6, 2008 the lead actress was Larisa Guzeyeva. The program also involved an astrologer Vasilisa Volodina and matchmaker Rosa Syabitova.
- The new presenter of the program, the actress and astrologer Lydia Arefyeva, was on the program from October 30, 2014 until February 18, 2015.
- From February 19, 2015 – February 24, 2015 astrologist Tamara Globa took the place of Arefeva. Arefeva returned to the program on February 25, 2015.
- On April 13, 2015 the host was again Volodina.

== Celebrity guests ==
Various celebrities took part in the show, including Olga Buzova, Anastasia Volochkova, Aleksandra Popova from Fabrika, and Slava Marlow (ru) with his friend Morgenshtern.
