= Pyotr Tochilin =

Russian film director and screenwriter (born 1974)

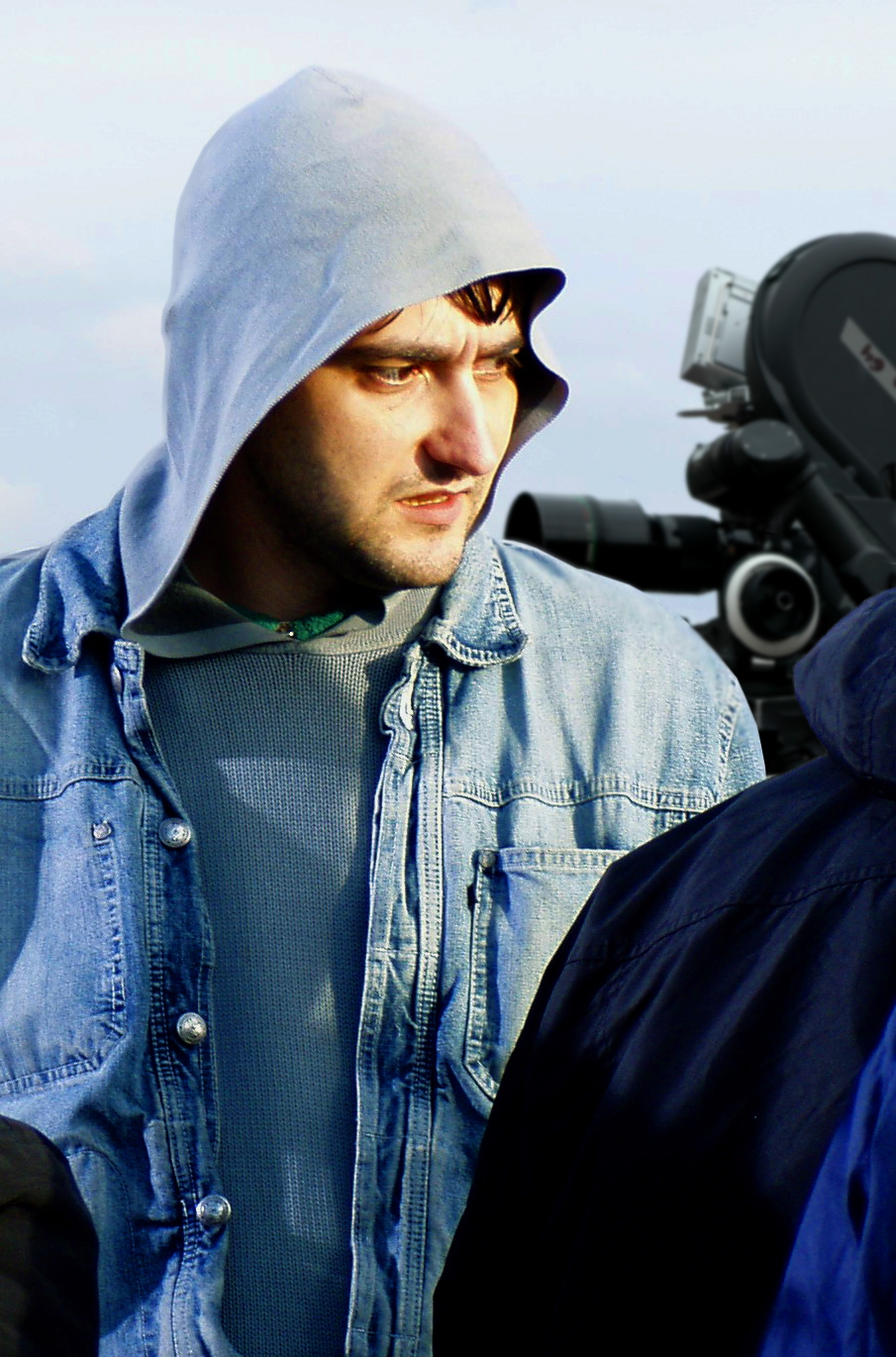
- Tochilin in November 1990
- Born: Пётр Владимирович Точилин; June 15, 1974 (age 50); Moldavian Soviet Socialist Republic, Chişinău
- Occupation(s): Film director, screenwriter
- Years active: 1988-present
- Website: www.tochilin.ru

Pyotr Vladimirovich Tochilin (Russian: Пётр Влади́мирович Точи́лин; born June 15, 1974 in Chişinău, Moldavian Soviet Socialist Republic) is a Russian film director and screenwriter. He has won several film awards.

== Biography ==
Tochilin was born on June 15, 1974 in Moldavian Soviet Socialist Republic.

In 1996 he graduated from "Moscow State University of Culture and Arts" degree in "Directing film and TV".

In 2006, he directed the film Khottabych. From 2008 to 2009, he worked on the show Univer.

== Filmography ==
- Upotrebit' do: (1999)
- Khottabych (2006)
- Univer (TV series, 2008)
- Rokery (2009)
- Geroi prodazh (2011)
- Dublyor (2013)
- Obratnaya storona Luny (2015)
