= Wolfhound (2006 film) =

2006 Russian film by Nikolai Lebedev

- Theatrical release poster
- Directed by: Nikolai Lebedev
- Written by: Maria Semyonova (novel); Nikolai Lebedev
- Produced by: Ruben Dishdishyan; Yuri Moroz
- Starring: Aleksandr Bukharov; Oksana Akinshina
- Music by: Alexey Rybnikov
- Distributed by: Central Partnership
- Release date: 28 December 2006
- Running time: 136 minutes
- Country: Russia
- Language: Russian (original)
- Budget: USD$10 million
- Box office: $20,015,075 (Russian & CIS) $21,819,348 (USA) $42,834,502

Wolfhound of the Grey Hound Clan (Russian: Волкодав из рода Серых Псов, romanized: Volkodav iz roda Serykh Psov) is a 2006 Russian slavic fantasy film directed by Nikolai Lebedev, based on the novel of the same name by Maria Semenova.

With one of the biggest film budgets in the history of Russian cinema (including work done in post production by international studios), the film was a notable success in its homeland.

Although the film did not see widespread theatrical release in the English speaking world, international distributors such as Central Partnership and Momentum Pictures have produced English language home video versions which have met with some critical acclaim.

== Plot ==
The setting of the film is a high fantasy Dark Ages Europe, in which desperate and bloodthirsty warlords fight brutal battles in their eternal quest for overlordship. Yet their swords, shields, lances, spears and arrows are all brittle, prone to wear and tear, and dull, protracting their campaigns against each other without end. Word spreads of a man in one of the Northern tribes: an adept blacksmith capable of crafting far hardier, stronger, sharper, and more durable weapons than any other known to exist, with aid of a mystical element. The warlords search for the enigmatic master of weapons to no avail.

A former druid chieftain named Zhadoba, jaded by years of warfare and believing the Radiant Gods have abandoned him, learns of the identity and whereabouts of the blacksmith and his coveted weapons, more valuable than any gold in such a time. With this knowledge, Zhadoba's heart is hardened to mercy and replaced with greed and bloodlust. Bringing even the feared warlord, the Man-Eater, under his spell, Zhadoba massacres an entire people, the Clan of the Grey Hounds, including their blacksmith, and takes his legendary weapons. The only survivor of the tribe, the blacksmith's fair-haired son, witnesses the slaughter and bites at Zhadoba's tattooed hand. Instead of killing the boy, Zhadoba orders the boy to be sent into the savage mines of the Crystal Mountains and to live a life of hard labor there, in conditions which will no doubt kill the boy anyway.

The boy survives and gains physical strength through years of hard labor, motivated by a desire for revenge. During this time, his only companions are other slaves and a bat named Ragged Wing, who remains with him. After killing his overseers using weapons made with his father's secret techniques and escaping the mines, he becomes a wanderer known as Wolfhound, a warrior skilled with weapons like his father.

After making the long journey to the Man-Eater's castle, Wolfhound finally conquers his archenemy. He also frees two prisoners, the sage and healer Tilorn and slave-girl Niilit. Wolfhound accompanies them to their home city of Galirad, which has been thrown into turmoil. The power-crazed forces under Zhadoba are poised to attack the city with their superior weapons at any moment. With enough bloodshed, and the right ritual involving royal blood, Zhadoba believes he can resurrect the ancient Dark Goddess Morana from the Celestial Gates and draw power from her. The King of Galirad, to save the city from destruction, is giving his daughter away in marriage to Vinitar, a young warrior-prince who promises to protect Galirad - and who also happens to be the son of the late warlord, the Man-Eater. Princess Elen must travel to the land of her husband-to-be, and asks Wolfhound to be her guard in this dangerous journey. Wolfhound agrees to serve the princess and is caught up in a whirlwind of mysterious events, as the true purpose of the journey is gradually revealed, a secret which could plunge the world into an eternal living nightmare...

== Cast ==
- Aleksandr Bukharov as Wolfhound of The Grey Hound Clan / Volkodav
- Gennady Makoev as Zhadoba, also known as "The Greedy", formerly the druidic shaman of Cai'Aron; now High Priest of Morana the Dark One, and Lord of the cursed and haunted Polran Swamps. Zhadoba seeks the mystical sword of the Clan of The Grey Hounds, the Celestial Key, and the blood of Princess Elen, all to unleash his master upon the world.
- Oksana Akinshina as Princess Elen of Galirad / Princess Knesinka Yelen, who agrees to be married off to a warlord's son for the protection of her people; she chooses Wolfhound as her protector, eventually falling in love with Wolfhound and asking him to give her a child. Elen's blood is the key to Zhadoba and the Man-Eater's plans in resurrecting Morana the Dark One.
- Igor Petrenko as Duke Luchezar of Galirad, Princess Elen's traitorous cousin (Luchezar is Elen's brother in the English version)
- Aleksandr Domogarov as Vinitarly, commonly known as The Man-Eater (also The Cannibal and The Ogre) is, like Zhadoba, another former druidic chieftain turned savage warlord. The Man-Eater is Overlord of the land of Velemor, and at different times both ally and nemesis of his counterpart and rival, Zhadoba.
- Anatoliy Beliy as Prince Vinitar of Velemor, son of The Man-Eater, and Guardian of The Northern Gates
- Juozas Budraitis as Doongorm / Dungorm, kinsman to Duke Vinitar and Velemor's ambassador to Galirad
- Lilian Navrozashvili as Ertan, Doongorm's shield-maiden who falls in love with Wolfhound
- Natalya Varley as Mother Kendarat, a Moon Goddess, patron of the Clan of The Grey Hounds, guardian of Wolfhound and enemy of Morana
- Andrey Rudensky as Tilorn / Tillorn, a blind wizard and healer
- Evgenia Sviridova as Niilit / Neelith, a slave girl rescued from the Man-Eater's castle by Wolfhound along with Tilorn
- Artyom Semakin as Evrikh / Eurikh, a young yet gifted scribe who is resurrected from death by Tilorn so that he can translate the Celestial Key, stolen from Galirad by the Man-Eater
- Rezo Esadze as Illad
- Nina Usatova as Vozhditsa Kharyukov
- Tatyana Lyutaeva as Lekarka
- Eugenia Tudorascu as Haigal
- Pyotr Zaychenko as Fitela
- Iliya Sokolovski as The Guardsman

== Production notes ==
Wolfhound is a film adaptation of the first novel of a four-book series about a mighty warrior by Russian author Maria Semyonova, a bestseller in the author's homeland. Semyonova openly takes inspiration from sources such as Slavic mythology, Celtic mythology, and Norse mythology, and with a few more familiar nods to the likes of Conan the Barbarian and The Lord of the Rings; yet the author has woven an intellectual property in its own right. Star Aleksandr Bukharov, a TV heart-throb in his native Russia, was chosen because Semyonava believed Bukharov to "embody" the character of Wolfhound.

Wolfhound was filmed in 2004 at the Mosfilm Studios in Moscow, Russia, and on-location in Slovakia. The film was in pre-production for two and a half years before general release, and included some American and British firms in digital compositing. Special effects by Dr. Picture Studios, post-production by Nordisk Film Post Production (facilities), Reel Sound (sound), Sound recorded in DTS, Dolby Digital.

With a final combined estimated budget of $20,000,000, Wolfhound became the second highest movie budget for any post-Soviet Russian film.

== Release dates and availability ==
Premiering in Moscow, Russia, on 28 December 2006, the film did not see wide theatrical release across Europe until 5 January 2007, and over the next year dozens of versions of the film with dubbed audio tracks were produced for international markets in dozens of languages. Other international distributors included Diema Films (Bulgaria), Atlantic Film (Sweden), Cathay-Keris Films (Singapore). The English language version by Momentum Pictures premiered at the Sci-Fi-London Convention in the United Kingdom on 2 May 2008, although it is still considered a direct-to-DVD film there due to the fact the film did not see widespread theatrical release across the English-speaking world. Wolfhound most recently received a 3D Blu-ray release in Germany.

== Box office and reception ==
=== Domestic ===
Originally, Wolfhound was both massively popular and a box office success in its native Russia, as well as in Scandinavia and the Baltics. The success was enough to green-light a twelve episode television series named Young Wolfhound based upon the film.

=== English-speaking world ===
The film itself when translated into English did not attain a great level of recognition in the English-speaking world, largely due to lack of any sustained advertising campaign in the West, a lack of any wide cinema release nor even widespread home video distribution. Critical reception was nearly nonexistent in the West due to this limited availability, and what there was tended to be mixed, but mostly positive; as demonstrated by the public reviews on Rotten Tomatoes. A typical review comes from The Hollywood Reporter which praises the production effort yet notes the film's clear similarities to Western films such as Conan and LOTR, and calls Wolfhound 'epic' yet 'old-fashioned'.

=== Awards ===
Wolfhound did however receive some notable international acclaim. One example of this is the fact the film won 3rd place in the Audience Award for Best Feature Film at the 2007 Toronto After Dark Film Festival. The film won the award for "Best Fight in Foreign Film" between Aleksandr Bukharov (Wolfhound) and Igor Petrenko (Luchezar) in the 2007 MTV Movie Awards. This award for "Best Fight" was shared with Gerard Butler (Leonidas) vs. The Uber Immortal (Kurrgan) in 300.

== Television series ==
The success of the film in Russia led in 2007 to a 12-part television series under the name of Young Wolfhound, also starring Aleksandr Bukharov yet with a notably darker and grittier tone than the film. The television series acted as a prequel to the film, and chronicled the events between the prologue of the film (Wolfhound as a boy witnesses the massacre of his tribe and is enslaved in the mines) and the subsequent first scene of the film (some twenty years later, whereby Wolfhound is already a powerful warrior having escaped the mines some time prior). The purpose of Young Wolfhound was to show what happened in the intermediate years to make Wolfhound such a warrior.
