= Maria Semyonova =

Russian writer and poet

- Russian: Мария Семёнова
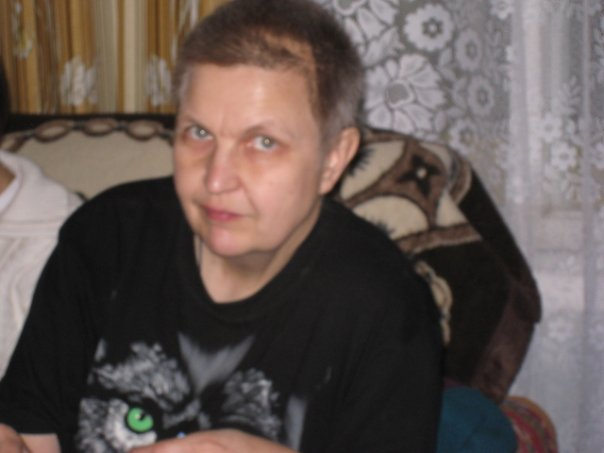
- Born: 1 November 1958 (age 67); Leningrad, Soviet Union
- Writing career
- Genres: Fantasy, History, Poetry

Maria Vasilyevna Semyonova (Russian: Мария Васильевна Семёнова, also spelled Semenova; born November 1, 1958, in Leningrad, Soviet Union) is a Russian writer of fantasy and historical fiction and a poet. Most of her books are based on Slavic mythology, as well as on Russian and Norse pagan traditions. She's best known for Wolfhound (Volkodav in Russian) fantasy series, that was adapted into 2007 film Wolfhound of The Grey Hound Clan and the 2006 video game Requital. Semyonova is also known for her numerous translations of western fantasy books into the Russian language.

== Biography ==
Semyonova graduated from Leningrad State University of Aerospace Instrument Making and worked as a computer specialist in the 1980s in a research institute.

From her childhood, Maria was interested in Medieval Rus, its traditions and mythology, as well as Viking Age. Her early books, written in Soviet era, were historical fiction about Vikings, medieval Russians and Finns, usually set in Scandinavia or Novgorod. She wrote about such historical persons as Ragnar Lodbrok, Aella of Northumbria, Rurik, Oleg and Vadim, among others. However, most of these books were not published until 1996, as Perestroika-era publishers were not interested in historical fiction.

After the fall of Soviet Union, Semyonova abandoned her computer work and became literary translator from English, working for Severo-Zapad. She translated several books by Robert E. Howard, Robin Hobb, L. Sprague de Camp, Margaret Weis and Tracy Hickman, among others. This is where she discovered Western fantasy and became fond of it. However, she was disappointed with a wave of Russian fantasy writers becoming copy-cats of their Western colleagues. Semenova decided to write a fantasy novel based exclusively on Russian tradition and mythology. "If you wanted fantasy, you get it. But why do you prefer the chewed-out Tolkien-esque sandwich, while our richest native tradition stays forgotten?" - she would recall.

In 1995, Wolfhound was released. The book, published by Severo-Zapad, was an immediate success, it spanned a series of sequels, a multi-author project, a film and a TV series. Often compared to Robert E. Howard Conan series, Wolfhound was intended as Conan's counterpart: a protector of the weak rather than adventurer. The books also included a large amount of poetry by Semenova, each chapter was accompanied by a verse. Several other Semenova books, including Dark Grey Wolf series, are set in the same universe with Wolfhound. Success of her fantasy novels allowed Semenova to publish her earlier historical books as well.

Maria Semyonova also wrote several lesser-known political detective books, together with Felix Razumovsky and various other co-authors. She also wrote a popular history encyclopedia "We, Slavs!" about the culture and traditions of Russian paganism.

Semyonova is an amateur aikido fighter.

== Works ==
=== Novels ===
- Ведун, Vedun (1985). Novella - Historical fiction, set in Viking Age Scandinavia
- Орлиная круча, Orlinaâ kruča) (1989). Novella - Historical fiction, set in Viking Age Scandinavia
- Pelko and Wolves (Пелко и волки, Pelko i volki) (1992) - Historical fiction, set in Medieval Rus
- The Wolfhound series: - Fantasy fiction
  1. Wolfhound (Волкодав, Volkodav) (1995)
  2. Wolfhound: The Right for a Fight (Волкодав. Право на поединок, Volkodav. Pravo na poedinok) (1996)
  3. Wolfhound: Stone of Rage (Волкодав. Истовик-камень, Volkodav. Istovik-kamenʹ) (2000)
  4. Wolfhound: Sign of the Way (Волкодав. Знамение пути, Volkodav. Znamenie puti) (2003)
  5. Wolfhound: Emerald Mountains (Волкодав. Самоцветные горы, Volkodav. Samocvetnye gory) (2003)
- The Nine Worlds (Девять миров, Devâtʹ mirov) (1996) - Fantasy fiction
- Two Tempests (Две грозы, Dve grozy) (1996) - Fantasy fiction
- Valkyrie: The One I Always Wait For (Валькирия: Тот, кого я всегда жду, Valʹkiriâ: Tot, kogo â vsegda ždu) (1996) - Historical fiction, set in Viking Age Scandinavia
- A Duel with Dragon (Поединок со Змеем, Poedinok so Zmeem) (1996) - Historical fiction, set in Viking Age Scandinavia
- Swans' Road (Лебединая дорога, Lebedinaâ doroga) (1996) - Historical fiction, set in Viking Age Scandinavia and in Medieval Rus
- Skunk series: - Detectives
  1. The Same Men and Skunk (Те же и Скунс, Te že i Skuns) (1997, with Ye. Milkova, V. Voskoboinikov)
  2. The Same Men and Skunk 2 (Те же и Скунс — 2, Te že i Skuns - 2) (1999, with V. Voskoboinikov, F. Razumovski)
  3. Order (Заказ, Zakaz) (1999, with K. Kulchitski)
- Sword of the Dead (Знак Сокола, Znak Sokola, AKA Меч мёртвых, Meč mërtvyh) (1998, with Andrey Konstantinov) - Historical fiction, set in Medieval Rus
- Преступление без срока давности, Prestuplenie bez sroka davnosti (1999, with F. Razumovski) - Detectives
- Вкус крови, Vkus krovi (1999, with Ye. Milkova) - Detectives
- Магия успеха, Magiâ uspeha (2000, with F. Razumovski) - Detectives
- Дядя Леша, Dâdâ Leša (2000, with Ye. Milkova) - Detectives
- Окольцованные злом, Okolʹcovannye zlom (2000, with F. Razumovski) - Detectives
- Kudeyar series (with Felix Razumovsky): - Detectives
  1. Kudeyar: The Crimson Flower (Кудеяр. Аленький цветочек, Kudeâr. Alenʹkij cvetoček) (2001)
  2. Kudeyar: The Tower of Babel (Кудеяр. Вавилонская башня, Kudeâr. Vavilonskaâ bašnâ) (2006)
- Привычка жить, Privyčka žitʹ (2005) - sci-fi
- Dark Grey Wolf series (with Dmitry Tedeyev): - Fantasy fiction
  1. Where Forest Doesn't Grow (Там, где лес не растет, Tam, gde les ne rastet) (2007)
  2. Dark Grey Wolf (Бусый Волк, Busyj volk) (2007)
  3. Dark Grey Wolf: Birch Bark Book (Бусый волк. Берестяная книга, Busyj volk. Berestânaâ kniga) (2009)
- Mistake-2012 series (with Felix Razumovsky): - Detectives
  1. Game For No Sake (Игра нипочем, Igra nipočem) (2008)
  2. Joker (Джокер, Džoker) (2009)
  3. New Game (Новая игра, Novaâ igra) (2010)
  4. Rough Miser (Мизер вчерную, Mizer včernuû) (2011)

=== Short story collections ===
- Swans Fly Away (Лебеди улетают, Lebedi uletaût) (1989) - Historical fiction, set in Viking Age Scandinavia
- With Vikings for Svalbard (С викингами на Свальбард, S vikingami na Svalʹbard) (1996) - Historical fiction, set in Viking Age Scandinavia
- A Lame Smith (Хромой кузнец, Hromoj kuznec) (2001) - Historical fiction, set in Viking Age Scandinavia
- Новые легенды, Novye legendy (2004, with V. Rybakov) - Fantasy fiction

=== Short stories ===
Uncollected short stories.

- Два короля, Dva korolâ (1996) - Historical fiction, set in Viking Age Scandinavia
- Сольвейг и мы все, Solʹvejg i my vse (1999) - Historical fiction, set in Viking Age Scandinavia

=== Poems ===
- Кубик из красной пластмассы, Kubik iz krasnoj plastmassy (2008). Collection

=== Nonfiction ===
- We, Slavs! (Мы, славяне!, My, slavâne!) (1997) - a popular history encyclopedia

== Adaptations ==
- Wolfhound of The Grey Hound Clan (2007)
- Young Wolfhound (TV, 2007)
- Requital (video game (Microsoft Windows), 2006)

== Awards ==
- 1989 The best children's book for Swans Fly Away
- 1996 Belyaev Prize for Wolfhound
- 2005 Aelita Award
- 2007 Mir Fantastiki Best Fantasy Award for Where Forest Doesn't Grow
- 2008 Roscon Award as Writer of the Year
