= Young Wolfhound =

- Written by: Alyona Zvantsova
- Directed by: Oleg Fomin
- Starring: Aleksandr Bukharov; Yegor Timpunik
- Country of origin: Russia
- Original language: Russian
- No. of episodes: 12

Production
- Running time: 528 min

Original release
- Network: NTV, Central Partnership
- Release: 2006 – 2007

Related
- Wolfhound (chronology)

Young Wolfhound (Russian: Молодой Волкодав, romanized: Molodoy Volkodav) is a 2006–2007 Russian adventure fantasy TV series, a prequel to the 2006 film Wolfhound. Series was loosely based on the novels by Maria Semyonova about Wolfhound's young life.

== Cast ==
- Aleksandr Bukharov as Wolfhound
- Anna Azarova as Viliya
- Elvira Bolgova as Neya
- Nataliya Dogadina as Kendrat
- Andrei Chadov as Kattai
- Pavel Abdalov as Gvalior
- Yegor Barinov as Lyudoed
- Mikhail Evlanov as Wolf
- Oleg Fomin as Svaltyga
- Andrei Kharitonov as Debtor
- Liubomiras Lauciavicius as Warlock
- Alexander Loio as Stinky
- Galina Petrova as Kattai's Mother
- Maxim Shishkov as Young Wolf
- Yegor Timpunik as Young Wolfhound
- Leonid Timtsunik as Tzeregat
- Aleksandr Yatsko as Tirgei
- Aleksandr Loye as Stinky
