= Nevermore (1962 film) =

- Russian: Никогда
- Directed by: Vladimir Dyachenko; Pyotr Todorovsky
- Written by: Grigori Pozhenyan
- Starring: Yevgeny Yevstigneyev; Pyotr Gorin; Yevgeny Grigorev; Stanislav Khitrov; Ninel Myshkova
- Cinematography: Pyotr Todorovskiy
- Edited by: Valentina Mironova
- Music by: Oleg Karavaychuk
- Production company: Odesa Film Studio
- Release date: 1962
- Running time: 90 minutes
- Country: Soviet Union
- Language: Russian

Nevermore (Russian: Никогда, romanized: Nikogda) is a 1962 Soviet drama film directed by Vladimir Dyachenko and Pyotr Todorovsky.

== Plot ==
The story centers on a new director, Aleksin, who arrives at a major shipbuilding factory from Leningrad. He is a competent, intelligent, and principled man, but he is also rigid, cold, and seemingly devoid of emotion, focused solely on work and discipline. His uncompromising methods and strict adherence to order lead to conflict with the factory workers. Aleksin's management style, which emphasizes the worker's role over their personal identity, alienates those around him. For example, a hardworking but undisciplined young employee, fired by Aleksin, struggles deeply with the loss, while another worker resents being forced to stand at attention while speaking with the director, exclaiming, "Am I in the army or what?!"

As Aleksin's interactions with the staff become increasingly strained, a sense of isolation envelops him. Despite his attempts to improve relationships, he is met with hostility and indifference. In one scene, he tries to have a heartfelt conversation with his secretary, only for her to quietly leave the room while he remains oblivious, continuing his monologue into empty space. During a wedding scene, Aleksin unexpectedly attends, and his entrance is met with complete silence from the guests, after which he demonstrates an unusual talent for playing the forks. The film also explores Aleksin's relationship with his wife, where even with the woman he loves, he remains emotionally distant, unable to communicate openly. The story culminates with the launch of a ship, accompanied by a celebration of the factory workers, where Alexin remains a solitary figure, disconnected from the joy around him.

== Cast ==
- Yevgeny Yevstigneyev as Alexander Aleksin, new director shipyard
- Pyotr Gorin as Fyodor Shanko
- Ninel Myshkova as Irina, wife Aleksin
- Yevgeny Grigorev as Garpischenko
- Stanislav Khitrov as Melnitsky
- Yevgeny Lavrovsky as Dolina
- Leonid Parkhomenko as Shcherbak
- Mariya Lvova as Inna
- Valentina Vladimirova as Masha
- Valery Nosik as Nitochkin

== Critical response ==
Sergey Kudryavtsev noted in his review that "Todorovsky's film lacks excessive fervor and maximalist pathos—for example, unlike a number of "anti-authority" scenes in Marlen Khutsiev's film "I Am Twenty", which was being produced simultaneously". In 2023, Zavtra newspaper columnist Galina Ivankina wrote: "What's wrong with the director? Isn't he sensitive? Doesn't he understand the situation when such an entry is the beginning of the degradation of the entire process? Such an Aleksin can't have favorites, and it's precisely 'his people,' as a species, who ultimately destroyed the Soviet world".
