= Tamara Syomina =

Soviet and Russian actress

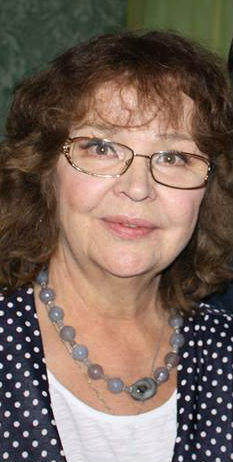
- In October 2012 in Kaluga
- Born: Tamara Petrovna Bokhonova; 25 October 1938 (age 87); Lgov, Kursk Oblast, RSFSR, Soviet Union
- Occupation: Actress
- Years active: 1957–present

Tamara Petrovna Syomina, née Bokhonova (Russian: Тамара Петровна Сёмина; born 25 October 1938), is a Soviet and Russian film actress. She appeared in more than forty films since 1959. People's Artist of the RSFSR (1978).

== Biography ==
Tamara Petrovna Syomina was born on 25 October 1938 in Lgov, Kursk Oblast into a family of a soldier, tank platoon commander Pyotr Fyodorovich Bokhonov. During the Great Patriotic War her father was killed on the front. In 1942 her mother, Tamara Vasilyevna was evacuated with two young children, and later came to grandparents in Bryansk, where Tamara went to school.

In 1946 Tamara Vasilyevna married Pyotr Vasilyevich Syomin who adopted the children, which led to Tamara bearing his last name.

Soon Tamara Vasilyevna and Pyotr Vasilyevich with children moved to Kaluga, closer to his mother. Because education was free only until the 8th grade Tamara had to leave school. Her parents wanted to send her to work at a factory but Tamara intended to study and she decided to go to the school of young workers. In the school for young workers she became simultaneously a pupil, a librarian and a secretary.

She entered the Kaluga Pedagogical Institute, but then picked up her documents and went to Moscow, deciding to become an actress.

Tamara wanted to enter VGIK to study acting but applications were already closed, however the dean of the acting faculty persuaded the commission to make an exception for Tamara.

During the first course Syomina starred in graduation films made by young directors and cinematographers. She played in the eccentric comedy Man Overboard by Andrei Sakharov; on the second course she met with the young but already famous Marlen Khutsiev in the film Two Fedors; during the third year Syomina coped with the complex dramatic role in the movie It all starts with the road by Villen Azarov.

She graduated from the actor's workshop led by Olga Pyzhova at VGIK in 1961.

In 1959 Mikhail Schweitzer invited Syomina for the role of Katyusha Maslova in the film adaptation of Leo Tolstoy's novel Resurrection.

On the set Schweitzer and Milkina, his wife and assistant, continually helped the young actress. Once Schweitzer noted that Syomina was too thin and asked if she read Tolstoy's novel. In the novel, Katyusha Maslova is described as a plump woman, even stout. Everyone at the VGIK hostel was then on a mission to "save" Syomina. Food was always brought to her so that she could quickly gain weight for the role.

Immediately after the playing the role of Katyusha the actress was bombarded with offers to play fallen women. But Syomina immediately realized how detrimental it would be to get typecast and rejected all of these proposals.

For her role in Resurrection readers of the magazine Soviet Screen recognized Syomina as the best actress of 1961. The film was successfully shown in different countries, and in 1962 at the XV Locarno International Film Festival Syomina was awarded the FIPRESCI prize for best female acting. She was also recognized as the best actress at the film festival in Mar del Plata International Film Festival in Argentina. Her acting in the film was praised Federico Fellini and Giulietta Masina. Since 1961 she worked as an actress at the National Film Actors' Theatre.

== Personal life ==
On the second course Syomina married her fellow VGIK student Vladimir Prokofiev and their marriage lasted until his very death. Unlike his wife, Prokofiev who had undeniable talent did not become widely known in the cinematic medium. However audiences are familiar with his voice: for more than thirty years Prokofiev dubbed movies on Gorky Film Studio. Since the late 1980s, Syomina did not act much in film, in 1988 her husband had a stroke, and the next 17 years Tamara Petrovna devoted to caring for her husband. After his death on 25 September 2005 from the effects of a stroke, Syomina did not remarry. The actress did not have children.

== Filmography ==
Year	Film	Role
1958	Two Fyodors	Natasha
1960	Resurrection	Katyusha Maslova
1962	Colleagues	Dasha
1962	A Trip Without a Load	Arina Semyonovna
1963	The Serf Actress	Anastasiya Batmanova
1963	A Day of Happiness	Aleksandra Orlova
1965	Time, Forward!	Olya Tregubova
1965	Clean Ponds	Anna Samokhina
1968	The Golden Calf	Rayechka
1968	Love of Serafim Frolov	Nastya Silina
1973–83	Eternal Call	Anfisa Mikhailovna Inyutina
1978	The Tavern on Pyatnitskaya	Irina Vasilyevna Surmina
1978	Pugachev	Sofia Pugacheva
1983	Offered for Singles	Larisa Yevgenyevna
1984	I Still Love, I Still Hope	Agnessa Fyodorovna Zakharova
1994	Maestro Thief	Nina

== Awards and honors ==
- Honored Artist of the RSFSR (26 November 1965)
- People's Artist of the RSFSR (2 January 1978)
- Order of the Red Banner of Labour (2 August 1990)
- Order of Honour (7 April 2005)
