= Magician (1967 film) =

- Directed by: Pyotr Todorovsky
- Written by: Alexander Volodin
- Starring: Zinovy Gerdt; Alla Larionova; Yevgeny Leonov; Vladimir Basov; Svetlana Kharitonova; Valentina Titova
- Cinematography: Iliya Minkovetsky
- Edited by: Yevgeniya Abdirkina
- Music by: Mieczysław Weinberg
- Production company: Experimental creative studio (Mosfilm)
- Release date: 1967
- Running time: 75 minutes
- Country: Soviet Union
- Language: Russian

Magician (Russian: Фокусник, romanized: Fokusnik) is a 1967 Soviet drama film directed by Pyotr Todorovsky. It was the Experimental Creative Studio's (subdivision of Mosfilm) first film.

== Plot ==
The film is about an elderly magician a good man, shy, but at the same honest and principled. Because of the lack of shows, he is forced to do house concerts. Once Kukushkin meets a young beauty by the name of Elena, and falls in love with her. He and Elena arrange something like a wedding, but the young wife is only interested in making important connections, afterwards she throws out the magician. Kukushkin does not become discouraged and stands in the yard distributing oranges to children. He realizes that the greatest magic is to give people the best that you have.

== Cast ==
- Zinovy Gerdt as Viktor Mikhailovich Kukushkin, an illusionist
- Alla Larionova as Elena Ivanovna
- Yevgeny Leonov as Stepan Nikolayevich Rossomakhin, the boss of Kukushkin
- Olga Gobzeva as Lily, the daughter of Kukushkin
- Leonid Dyachkov as Pavel, the investigator
- Vladimir Basov as pop entertainer-satirist
- Svetlana Kharitonova as Sasha, Dima's wife
- Edward Abert as Dima, the juggler
- Oleg Gerasimov as episode
- Valentina Titova as Dasha, editor
- Konstantin Zaitsev as episode
- Inessa Drovosekova as wife of Rossomakhin

== Criticism ==
- Sergey Kudryavtsev's Review
