= Two Fyodors =

- Russian: Два Фёдора
- Directed by: Marlen Khutsiev
- Written by: Valeri Savchenko
- Produced by: Adolf Fradis
- Starring: Vasily Shukshin; Nikolai Chursin; Tamara Syomina
- Cinematography: Pyotr Todorovsky
- Music by: Yuli Meitus
- Production company: Odessa Film Studio
- Release date: 1958
- Running time: 89 min.
- Country: Soviet Union
- Language: Russian

Two Fyodors (Russian: Два Фёдора, romanized: Dva Fyodora) is a 1958 Soviet World War II film directed by Marlen Khutsiev.

== Plot ==
After the end of the World War II, Fyodor returned to his homeland and met the homeless boy Fyodor the Small. They decide to live together. And all they had was wonderful, until Fyodor married.

With the marriage of Fyodor Sr., their harmonious life is disorganized, although Natasha is trying in every way to win the boy's love. Driven by jealousy to despair, the boy runs away from home. But after much agitation and searching, they find him, and he reconciles with the adults.

== Cast ==
- Vasily Shukshin as Great Fyodor
- Nikolai Chursin as Little Fyodor
- Tamara Syomina as Natasha
- Ivan Poletayev as Ivan
- Maria Shamanskaya as Fyodor's neighbor
- Igor Politayev as Ivan Nikanorovich
- Aleksandr Kamenko-Aleksandrovskiy as kiosker
- Nikolai Klyuchnev as guy at the dance

== Release ==
Marlen Khutsiev's film was watched by 20.4 million viewers, which is 908 results in the entire history of the Soviet film distribution.
