= The Last Victim =

The Last Victim may refer to:

- The Last Victim (book), a non-fiction work by Jason Moss
- The Last Victim (1975 film), a Soviet drama film
- The Last Victim, also known as Forced Entry, a 1975 American horror film
- The Last Victim (2021 film), an American neo-Western crime-thriller film

== See also ==
- The Last Victims, a 2019 political drama film
