= Vyacheslav Nevinny =

Soviet-Russian actor

- Вячеслав Невинный
- Nevinny in 2004
- Born: Vyacheslav Mikhailovich Nevinny; 30 November 1934; Tula, Moscow Oblast, RSFSR, Soviet Union
- Died: 31 May 2009 (aged 74); Moscow, Russia
- Resting place: Troyekurovskoye Cemetery
- Occupation: Actor
- Years active: 1959–2003
- Title: People's Artist of the USSR (1986)

Vyacheslav Mikhailovich Nevinny (Russian: Вячесла́в Миха́йлович Неви́нный; 30 November 1934 – 31 May 2009) was a Soviet and Russian actor who was titled a People's Artist of the USSR in 1986. He worked in the Moscow Art Theatre from 1959 until his death in 2009.

== Biography ==
Nevinny was born on 30 November 1934 in Tula. After graduating in 1954 from high school, he tried to join the school studio of Moscow Arts Theater, but failed the examinations. After failure, he did not leave a dream to become an actor. Instead, he became employed in the Tula Theatre for Young Spectators as a supporting actor.

In 1955, Nevinny again took an examination in the school studio of Moscow Arts Theater; this time, the attempt was successful. After graduation in 1959 (Viktor Stanitsyn's course), he became an actor. He participated in many performances, such as:

- The Government Inspector (as Khlestakov),
- Ivanov (as Borkin),
- The Seagull (as Shamraev),
- Uncle Vanya (as Telegin),
- The Cherry Orchard (as Epikhodov),
- Woe from Wit (as Famusov), etc.

In 1960, Nevinny made his debut in cinema as a policeman in the movie Probation. After his first role, Nevinny played in several other movies, The Chairman (as Pavel Markushev) and Ruslan and Ludmila (as Farlaf). Vyacheslav Nevinny also played in the famous comedies The Garage (1979) and It Can't Be! (1975).

In 1984, Nevinny played the role of Sobakevich in Dead Souls. In the same year, he took part in the popular children sci-fi TV series Guest from the Future as space pirate Veselchak U (lit. Jolly Man U).

Yevgeni Gerasimov's comedy Do Not Marry, Girls (1985), in which Nevinny played one of the leads, was very popular with the viewers, as well as his roles in Eldar Ryazanov's comedy Beware of the Car (1966) and Promised Heaven (1991). One of Nevinny's last remarkable film roles was the remake of the famous Italian film Cops and Robbers (1997) by director Nikolai Dostal. Many popular Russian animation characters speak in Nevinny's voice. For many years, Nevinny had diabetes, which grew worse and worse. In 2003, he was taken to a hospital and had to spend a whole year there.

In 2005, Nevinny underwent major surgery. Nevinny's left foot was amputated because of gangrene. In 2006, his second foot was amputated, as the illness progressed.

Nevinny died at the age of 74 on 31 May 2009. President Dmitry Medvedev expressed his condolences to relatives and friends of the actor. Nevinny was buried on 3 June 2009 in Moscow's Troyekurovskoye Cemetery.

== Selected filmography ==
Actor

- Probation (1960) as Sergei Zaitsev, police officer
- Seven Winds (1962) as Yuriy Zubarov
- The Third Half (1963) as Savchuk
- It Happened at the Police Station (1963) as captain Serebrovsky
- The Green Flame (1964) as Vikharyev
- The Chairman (1964) as Pavel Markushev
- Thirty Three (1965) as Vasily Lyubashkin
- Clean Ponds (1965) as sailor
- Beware of the Car (1966) as car mechanic
- Virineya (1969) as Pavel Sluzov
- Passing Through Moscow (1970) as Valentin
- Russian Field (1972) as Pavel Fomich Fedchenkov
- Ruslan and Ludmila (1972) as Farlaf
- The Last Day (1973) as Stepan Danilovich Stepeshko
- It Can't Be! (1975) as Gorbushkin's brother-in-law, beer seller
- Au-u! (1976) as Writer
- Incognito from St. Petersburg (1978) as Zemlyanika
- Borrowing Matchsticks (1980) as Jussi Vatanen
- The Garage (1980) as Karpukhin
- The Old New Year (1981) as Pyotr Sebeykin, toy factory worker
- Crazy Day of Engineer Barkasov (1983, TV Movie) as Kobylin
- Guest from the Future (1984, TV miniseries) as Veselchak U, space pirate
- Lev Tolstoy (1984) as Mummer
- Dead Souls (1984, TV miniseries) as Sobakevich
- I Still Love, I Still Hope (1985) as Boris Zakharov
- Do Not Marry, Girls (1985) as Ivan Savelievich Malkov, chairman of a collective farm
- Lilac Ball ( 1987) as Gromozeka, alien archaeologist
- Don't Leave... (1989, TV Movie) as King Theodore
- Shapka (1990) as Vasiliy Tryoshkin
- Promised Heaven ( 1991) as Stepan, bum
- Cops and Robbers (Полицейские и воры, 1997) as Slava

Voice actor

- Hedgehog in the Fog (Ёжик в тумане, 1975, Short) as Bear-Cub
- Bunny and Fly (Зайчонок и Муха, 1977, Short) as Fly
- Alice in Wonderland (Алиса в Стране чудес, 1981) as White Rabbit
- The Adventures of Lolo the Penguin (Приключения пингвинёнка Лоло, 1986, Short) as Pigo, grandfather
- The Kitten from Lizyukov street (Котёнок с улицы Лизюкова, 1988, Short) as Vasily the Cat

== Awards and honors ==
- Honored Artist of the RSFSR (1967)
- People's Artist of the RSFSR (1977)
- People's Artist of the USSR (1986)
- Order "For Merit to the Fatherland", 4th class (23 October 1998), 3rd class (24 June 2005)
- Order of Friendship of Peoples (28 October 1994)
