= Intergirl =

1989 film by Pyotr Todorovsky

- Directed by: Pyotr Todorovsky
- Written by: Vladimir Kunin
- Produced by: Mira Todorovskaya
- Starring: Elena Yakovleva; Vsevolod Shilovsky; Zinovy Gerdt; Lyubov Polishchuk; Ingeborga Dapkunaite; Larisa Malevannaya; Anastasiya Nemolyaeva
- Cinematography: Valery Shuvalov
- Edited by: Irina Kolotikova
- Music by: Pyotr Todorovsky; Igor Kantyukov
- Distributed by: Mosfilm
- Release date: 1989
- Running time: 143 minutes
- Country: USSR/Sweden
- Language: Russian

Intergirl (Russian: Интердевочка, translit. Interdevochka) is a 1989 Soviet-Sweden drama film. It is set in Leningrad in the time of perestroika during the 1980s. The film was the most popular Soviet film in 1989 (41.3 million viewers) and made a star of leading actress Elena Yakovleva.

It is the screen adaptation of the eponymous story by Vladimir Kunin.

== Plot ==
Tanya Zaitseva from Leningrad, a nurse by day and a prostitute catering to foreigners by night, suddenly receives a marriage proposal from a Swedish client. Her closest friends in the trade, former volleyball athlete Sima Gulliver, a Baltic beauty nicknamed Kisulya, and the gorgeous Zina Meleiko, are considered the elite of prostitutes. After another altercation with the police, she goes home to share good news with her mother, who thinks that her daughter is just a nurse. Tanya does not hide the fact that she is not marrying for love, but because she wants to have an apartment, a car, money and dreams "to see the world with my own eyes." In a conversation with her mother she argues that prostitution is characteristic of all trades, "everyone sell themselves", but her mother cannot accept it.

Tanya's former client and now fiancé, Edvard Larsen, is a pass for Tanya to the Western world of dreams. However, the Soviet bureaucracy gets in the way: there are some requirements to get a visa to Sweden. She needs to receive a permission for immigration from her father, whom she has not seen for 20 years. He demands 3,000 rubles in exchange for the paperwork - a lot of money - which forces Tanya back into prostitution.

Sweden very quickly bores the heroine. She makes friends with a Russian truck driver working for "Sovtransavto", through whom she sends gifts to her mother in Leningrad. Her Swedish "friends" never forget how Tanya earned in the USSR. Ed really loves his wife, but always makes comments about her habits. Tanya is an alien in a foreign world. She is homesick and wants to visit her mother. Meanwhile, Tanya's prostitute friend mentions during a conversation over the phone that they opened case on "illegal foreign currency speculation" on Tanya (a serious crime in the Soviet Union that carried severe penalties). Investigators come to Tanya's mother and reveal the secrets of her daughter's high earnings. Shocked and morally broken by this, Tanya's mother commits suicide by gassing herself to death in her apartment. Lyalya, a neighbor of Tanya, smells gas at the apartment and bursts in, knocking out the window. She pulls her out from the apartment and tries to revive her, but to no avail. She knocking on the neighbors' doors for help. At this moment in Sweden, Tanya looks back and her intuition tells her that something bad has happened. In panic, she abandons her lover and jumps into the car. Racing to the airport, she is killed in a car accident. The drama of the final episode is reinforced by the Russian folk song "Tramp" ("In the wild steppes of Transbaikal ..."), which is the leitmotif of the film.

== Cast ==
- Elena Yakovleva as Tanya Zaytseva
- Tomas Laustiola as Edvard Larsen, Tanya Zaytseva's husband (voice by Aleksandr Belyavsky)
- Larisa Malevannaya as Alla Sergeyevna Zaytseva, Tanya's mother
- Anastasiya Nemolyaeva as Lyalya, nurse, Tanya's friend
- Ingeborga Dapkūnaitė as Kisulya, prostitute
- Lyubov Polishchuk as Zina Meleyko, prostitute
- Irina Rozanova as Sima Gulliver, prostitute
- Natalia Shchukina as Natalya «Schoolgirl», prostitute
- Martinsh Vilsons as Victor, trucker
- Vsevolod Shilovsky as Nikolay Platonovich Zaytsev, Tanya's father
- Zinovy Gerdt as Boris Semenovich, chief medical officer
- Valeriy Khromushkin as Volodya, union organizer of hospital
- Maria Vinogradova as Sergeevna, nurse
- Igor Vetrov as Anatoliy A. Kudryavtsev, police captain
- Gennady Sidorov as Zhenya, police lieutenant
- Tatyana Agafonova as Verka, former Moscow prostitute living in Sweden
- Torsten Wahlund as Gunvald, Edvard Larsen's co-worker
- Sergey Bekhterev as waiter
- Anna Frolovtseva as FRRO employee
- Mintai Utepbergenov as Japanese businessman (voice by Aleksei Zolotnitsky)
- Igor Efimov as hotel janitor

== Production ==
As confirmed later by the director, he was ordered to make this film by the officials. Todorovsky had been chosen precisely for his inability to direct 'hot' content. Yakovleva refused 'messing around with men' in front of the camera, so all sex scenes were filmed without a partner. The feature's main purpose was to demonstrate the Soviet audience how misleading was a hope for a "beautiful Western life".

As the Swedish partners found the ending too desperate, for Sweden Todorovsky made a version with an open ending and merged the two episodes into one. However, the film was never released in Sweden due to the bankruptcy of Stallet-film, Mosfilm's co-production partner.

Filming took place in the summer of 1989 in Russia and Sweden. Mira Todorovska managed to attract Swedish sponsors who added the lacking money and helped with the filming, as movie became Mosfilm's first movie shot without state funding. Since it was virtually impossible to buy any fancy clothing in the USSR, the costume designer flew to Sweden to buy not only evening dresses, but even plain jeans.

== Reception and awards ==
Intergirl was the first depiction of a prostitute in Soviet pop culture. The word itself entered the Russian language and came to refer to all prostitutes serving foreigners. The film became the most popular Soviet film in 1989 with 41.3 million viewers, the leading actress Elena Yakovleva immediately became a star.

Described as the 'Cinderella with a darker twist', despite audience sympathy, the film received a lot of criticism, primarily for its pessimism and focus on the ugly side of life without really showing the hardships of the protagonist's reality.

The movie won three awards and received one nomination. Elena Yakovleva won Best Actress at the 1990 Nika Awards. At the 1989 Tokyo International Film Festival, Intergirl won the Special Jury Prize with Yakovleva receiving the Best Actress Award.

== Literature ==
- Lawton, Anna (1992). Kinoglasnost: Soviet Cinema in Our Time. Cambridge University Press. ISBN 0521388147.
- Passerini, Luisa; Ellena, Liliana; Geppert, Alexander C.T. (2010). New Dangerous Liaisons: Discourses on Europe and Love in the Twentieth Century. Berghahn Books. ISBN 978-1-84545-976-5.
- Smorodinskaya, Tatiana (2007). Encyclopedia of Contemporary Russian Culture. Routledge. p. 272. ISBN 9780415320948.
- Ilic, Melanie (2018). The Palgrave Handbook of Women and Gender in Twentieth-Century Russia and. Palgrave MacMillan. p. 249. ISBN 9781137549051.
- Campbell, Russell (2006). Marked Women: Prostitutes and Prostitution in the Cinema. The University of Wisconsin Press. pp. 151–152. ISBN 978-0-299-21253-7.
