= Epilogue (1983 film) =

1983 film by Marlen Khutsiev

- Russian: Эпилог
- Directed by: Marlen Khutsiev
- Written by: Marlen Khutsiev; Yuri Pakhomov
- Produced by: Fabian Mogilevsky
- Starring: Andrey Myagkov; Rostislav Plyatt
- Cinematography: Leonid Kalashnikov
- Edited by: Lyudmila Sviridenko
- Production company: Mosfilm
- Release date: November 21, 1983 (Soviet Union)
- Running time: 98 min.
- Country: Soviet Union
- Language: Russian

Epilogue (Russian: Послесловие, romanized: Posleslovie) is a 1983 Soviet psychological drama film directed by Marlen Khutsiev. A screen adaptation of the story of writer Yuri Pakhomov.

== Plot ==
Alexey Borisovich, a 75-year-old father from a small town in the south of Russia, comes to Moscow to visit his daughter. But the daughter went on a business trip. The elderly man meets his son-in-law, who had taken a leave to work on his thesis.

Two representatives of different generations and views on life spend several days together. Alexey Borisovich, a former military surgeon, while waiting for his daughter, spends time talking with his son-in-law Vladimir, occasionally meeting his old friends and walking around Moscow, where he spent his pre-war youth.

== Cast ==
- Andrey Myagkov as Vladimir Shvyrkov
- Rostislav Plyatt as Alexey Borisovich
- Yuri Senkevich as cameo

== Production ==
For the role of Alexey Borisovich, director Khutsiev originally invited Leonid Obolensky. The film was shot in Moscow on Vernadsky Avenue, Koshtoyants Street and in the Olympic Village.
