= I Still Love, I Still Hope =

- Russian: Ещё люблю, ещё надеюсь
- Directed by: Nikolay Lyrchikov
- Written by: Nikolay Lyrchikov
- Starring: Yevgeny Yevstigneyev; Tamara Syomina; Vyacheslav Nevinnyy; Valentina Talyzina; Marina Levtova
- Cinematography: Andrei Pashkevich; Nikolai Zholudev
- Edited by: Alla Myakotina
- Music by: Mark Minkov
- Release date: 1984
- Running time: 76 minute
- Country: Soviet Union
- Language: Russian

I Still Love, I Still Hope (Russian: Ещё люблю, ещё надеюсь) is a 1984 Soviet drama film directed by Nikolay Lyrchikov.

== Plot ==
The film tells of a man who all his life loved one woman. She was married, raised children and grandchildren, but despite this, all the while he remained her faithful friend. And suddenly, one fine New Year's evening, she knocks on his door.

== Cast ==
- Yevgeny Yevstigneyev as Vasiliy Vasilyevich
- Tamara Syomina as Agnessa Fyodorovna Zakharova
- Vyacheslav Nevinnyy as Boris Zakharov
- Valentina Talyzina as Antonina
- Marina Levtova as Lyusya
- Konstantin Lavronenko as Zhenya
- Boris Novikov as Pavel Petrovich
- Liliya Evstigneeva as Lidiya
- Lyudmila Gladunko as Zina
- Yevgeny Teterin as Pyotr
