= Colleagues (film) =

1962 film

- Russian: Коллеги
- Directed by: Aleksey Sakharov
- Written by: Vasiliy Aksyonov; Aleksey Sakharov
- Starring: Vasily Livanov; Vasily Lanovoy; Oleg Anofriyev; Nina Shatskaya; Tamara Syomina
- Cinematography: Vladimir Nikolayev
- Music by: Yuriy Levitin
- Release date: 1962
- Country: Soviet Union
- Language: Russian

Colleagues (Russian: Коллеги) is a 1962 Soviet drama film directed by Aleksey Sakharov.

The film tells about three completely different, but close to each other graduates of the Leningrad Medical Institute, who will have to cope with all the difficulties of life, to preserve their ideals and friendship.

== Plot ==
Three friends and recent graduates of the First Leningrad Medical Institute—Sasha, Aleksey, and Vladka—receive their assignments for work, embarking on their careers in vastly different settings. Alexey begins working in the quarantine service at an international port, where he uncovers a major scandal involving contaminated food products. Refusing bribes and undeterred by threats, Alexey reports the situation to the authorities, demonstrating his unwavering integrity and commitment to public health.

Meanwhile, Aleksey works as a doctor in a rural hospital, quickly earning the respect of the local community. His compassionate demeanor attracts the affection of a nurse, Dasha, who is also the target of a violent thief and bully, Bugrov. When Alexander interrupts Bugrov attempting a robbery, the criminal stabs him, inflicting a life-threatening injury. Fortunately, his friends arrive just in time to save him, with Vladka, now a skilled surgeon, performing the operation that solidifies his growth and dedication. Interwoven with the narrative is the poignant musical theme of the song "Paluba" (music by Yuri Levitin, lyrics by Gennady Shpalikov), performed by Oleg Anofriev, which underscores the emotional arc of the story, culminating in one of the film’s closing scenes.

== Cast ==
- Vasily Livanov as Sasha Zelenin
- Vasily Lanovoy as Aleksey Maksimov
- Oleg Anofriyev as Vladka Karpov
- Nina Shatskaya as Inna
- Tamara Syomina as Dasha Guryanova
- Rostislav Plyatt as Dampfer
- Vladimir Kashpur as Sergei Yegorov
- Vladimir Maruta as Makar Ivanovich
