= Andrey Pashkevich =

- Андрей Петрович Пашкевич
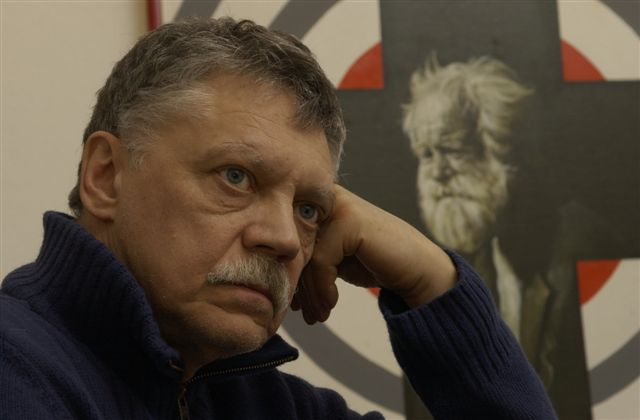
- Portrait photo of Andrey P. Pashkevich
- Born: 22 March 1945; Moscow
- Died: 21 February 2011 (aged 65); Moscow
- Education: All Russian Institute of Cinematography named after S. Gerasimov (VGIK), Moscow
- Known for: painter, cinematographer, film director & producer
- Notable work: politically inspired paintings “Politecology” and abstract paintings
- Website: http://www.politecology.ru

Andrey Petrovich Pashkevich (Russian: Андрей Петрович Пашкевич; 22 March 1945 - 21 February 2011) was a Russian cinematographer, film director & producer, and painter.

== Biography and artistic career ==
Pashkevich was born in Moscow in 1945 in the family of an art director, Petr I. Pashkevich, working at the film studios named after M. Gorky and professor at the Faculty of Art at the All Russian Institute of Cinematography named after S. Gerasimov, where Andrey Pashkevich finished his studies and obtained his diploma as cameraman and cinematographer.

As a Director of Photography he took part in the shooting of several feature films, amongst which some very well-known and still popular films such as “I still love, I still hope” («Еще люблю, еще надеюсь») and “We lived in the neighbourhood” («Мы жили по соседству») and also a number of documentary films such as “My friend, Otar Ioseliani” («Мой друг, Отар Иоселиани»).

In the 1990s Pashkevich created his own TV company “The Russian Musical Television” (RMTV) which produced musical programmes and series for Russian TV-channels.

At the same time he was actively painting.

The culminating point of the artistic heritage of Andrey Pashkevich is a series of paintings which the author himself called “Politecology” and which he has created during the period of Gorbachev's perestroika and the formation of the new Russia. It reflects the political and social turmoil that shook up the life of people in Russia. Love for his country and compassion for its people is an outstanding feature of Pashkevich's art. His “Politecology” has a purifying meaning. It is a tale about the suffering and bitter moments of Russian history that contains a warning and at the same time may be considered as a futuristic prophecy, a healing elixir and a very specific kind of catharsis.

Apart from the creations of these symbolic and very thoroughly thought over paintings about life influenced by political events, the painter also created abstract works, which are highly appreciated by art critics.

Andrey Pashkevich was a member of the International Federation of Artists (IFA).

The works of the artist are to be found in private collections, amongst which the collections of George Bush the Elder, the Richard Nixon Library in the US, and countries such as France, Portugal, Switzerland, Germany, Belgium, Spain, Finland, South Korea.

== Exhibitions ==
2017 – Tula, United Local History and Fine Arts Museum.

2016 – Voronezh, Voronezh Regional Art Museum named after I.N. Kramskoy

2016 – St Petersburg, F.M. Dostoyevsky Literary-Memorial Museum, exhibition “Andrey Pashkevich – Facets of Creativity”

2016 – Veliky Novgorod, Novgorod State United Art Museum

2015 – Ivanovo, Ivanovo Regional Art Museum

2015 – Staraya Russa, Novgorod State United Museum - Museum F.M. Dostoyevsky

2015 – Moscow, Central House of Journalists, 70th Birthday memorial event and exhibition

2014 – St Petersburg, State Conservatory named after N.A. Rimsky-Korsakov, exhibition of abstract paintings “Motion”

2014 – St Petersburg, State Hermitage and St Petersburg State University, poster presentation at V International Conference “Actual Problems of Theory and History of Art”

2014 – Nizhny Novgorod, Nizhny Novgorod State Exhibition Complex

2014 – St Petersburg, State Conservatory named after N.A. Ruimsky-Korsakov, exhibition “Female Images”

2013 – St Petersburg, The Russian Academy of Fine Arts Museum – I.I. Brodsky Apartment Museum

2013 – Kaluga, Kaluga Regional Art Museum

2013 – Vladimir, Art Centre of the Vladimir Region

2013 – Moscow, Theatre “MEL”, Remembrance event Andrey Pashkevich

2012 – Moscow, “Petr Pashkevich – Andrey Pashkevich” joint exhibition, Russian State Institute of Cinematography named after S. Gerasimov, Faculty of Art

2012 – Bulgaria, Sofia, National Gallery for Foreign Art

2011 – Moscow, Art Manezh – 2011

2011 – Moscow, Gallery “Dom Naschokina”, exhibition “Family Values”

2010 – Moscow, Central House of Artists, exhibition “With Faith and Hope”

2010 – Moscow, Gallery “Dom Naschokina”, exhibition “Politecology – 2”

2009 – Moscow, Moscow Municipal Duma (Parliament)

2007 – Moscow, Museum of Contemporary History of Russia, “Expression of the Spirit” exhibition

2006 – Moscow, Gallery “Dom Naschokina”, author and participant to the “Furniture as an Art” Exhibition

2006 – China, Beijing, participation to the exhibition of Modern Russian Art in the Museum of World Art in the frame of the Year of Russia in China

2005 – Moscow, Art Manezh – 2005

2005 – Moscow, Gallery “Dom Naschokina”, exhibition “Politecology”

2004 – Moscow, Museum of Contemporary History of Russia

2002 – Moscow, Kinotsentr “Muzei Kino”

1995 – USA, Washington, Nixon Foundation

1994 – Spain, Tenerife, Centre of Graphic Art

1993 – Belgium, Antwerp “Cultural Capital of Europe”

1993 – Belgium, Antwerp, Pushkin Cultural Centre

1992 – Moscow, Dom Kino

1991 – Moscow, Manezh Exhibition Hall

1990 – South Korea, Seoul

== Filmography ==
=== Feature films ===
1. Denouncer (Стукач) – 1988
2. I Still Love, I Still Hope (Еще люблю, еще надеюсь) – 1984
3. Youth (Молодость – выпуск 4) – 1982
4. Crazy Day of Engineer Barkasov (Безумный день инженера Баркасова) – TV – 1982
5. We lived in the neighbourhood (Мы жили по соседству) – 1981

=== Documentary films ===
1. My friend, Otar Iosseliani (мой друг Отар Иоселини) – 2010
2. Characters from the Peremilovo village (Персонажи из деревни Перемилово) – 2004
3. The Tale of a Painting (История одной картины) – 1997
