= It Happened at the Police Station (1963 film) =

- Russian film poster
- Russian: Это случилось в милиции
- Directed by: Villen Azarov
- Written by: Izrail Metter
- Starring: Vsevolod Sanaev; Mark Bernes; Vyacheslav Nevinnyy; Aleksandr Belyavskiy; Oleg Golubitsky; Zoya Fyodorova; Sergey Nikonenko
- Cinematography: Mark Dyatlov
- Music by: Aleksandr Flyarkovsky
- Production company: Mosfilm
- Release date: 1963
- Running time: 87 minute
- Country: Soviet Union
- Language: Russian

It Happened at the Police Station (Russian: Это случилось в милиции) is a 1963 Soviet drama film directed by Villen Azarov.

== Plot ==
The film tells about the police named Nikolai Sazonov, who is trying to find a man who disappeared during the siege of Leningrad.

== Cast ==
- Vsevolod Sanaev
- Mark Bernes
- Vyacheslav Nevinnyy
- Aleksandr Belyavskiy
- Oleg Golubitsky
- Zoya Fyodorova
- Sergey Nikonenko
- Lidiya Smirnova
- Mikhail Ulyanov
- Gennadiy Yukhtin
