= Life Unawares =

- Directed by: Alexander Brunkovsky
- Written by: Alexander Brunkovsky; Anna Yarovenko
- Produced by: Stanislav Ershov; Iurii Obuhov
- Starring: Alexandra Prokofyeva; Sergei Batalov; Marina Yakovleva; Dmitry Kubasov; Markus Kunze
- Cinematography: Dmitry Ulyukaev
- Music by: Ruslan Kvinta
- Distributed by: Amadeus Film
- Release date: 2007
- Running time: 78 min.
- Country: Russia
- Language: Russian

Life Unawares (Russian: Жизнь врасплох, romanized: Zhizn vrasplokh) is a 2007 Russian film directed by Alexander Brunkovsky.

== Plot ==
Masha — an eighteen-year girl, dreams of a completely different life. One day, hitting the casting of "reality shows", she meets with the producer of the project. Mutual attraction opens the door to her into the world of show business. Masha agrees to participate in this "reality show", but she is faced with serious moral issues that affect her life.

== Cast ==
- Alexandra Prokofyeva as Masha
- Sergei Batalov as Masha's father
- Marina Yakovleva as Masha's mom
- Dmitry Kozlov as Tyoma
- Artyom Krestovsky as Bull
- Dmitry Kubasov as Vovan
- Markus Kunze as Amadeus
- Tatyana Lavrentyeva as Frau Tilleman
- Vsevolod Shilovsky as Sidor Kamilovich
- Dmitry Sharakois as Artyom
- Mika Newton as cameo
