= Clean Ponds (film) =

- Russian poster
- Russian: Чистые пруды
- Directed by: Aleksey Sakharov
- Written by: Bella Akhmadulina; Yury Nagibin
- Starring: Aleksandr Zbruyev; Tamara Syomina; Svetlana Svetlichnaya; Lyudmila Gladunko; Yevgenia Filonova
- Cinematography: Leonid Kalashnikov
- Edited by: Antonina Zimina
- Music by: Yury Levitin
- Production company: Mosfilm
- Release date: 1965
- Running time: 81 min.
- Country: Soviet Union
- Language: Russian

Clean Ponds (Russian: Чистые пруды, romanized: Chistye prudy) is a 1965 Soviet drama film directed by Aleksey Sakharov.

== Plot ==
Four inseparable friends—Seryozha, Nina, Oska, and Zhenya—spend their school years together near Chistye Prudy in Moscow. In their favorite gazebo, they dream about the future and promise to meet again in twenty years, unaware that war will break out the very next day, changing their lives forever. As the war begins, Oska joins the militia, Zhenya becomes a combat pilot, and Seryozha, now a young lieutenant, heads to the front. He will face brutal battles, a concussion, time in a hospital, and work for a military newspaper—alongside devastating news: Oska will fall in battle near Yelnya, and Zhenya will be posthumously awarded the title Hero of the Soviet Union.

== Cast ==
- Aleksandr Zbruyev as Sergei
- Tamara Syomina as Anna
- Svetlana Svetlichnaya as Katya
- Lyudmila Gladunko as Zhenya
- Yevgenia Filonova as Nina
- Vladimir Yevstafyev as Os'ka
- Nina Agapova as Kul'chitskaya
- Nikolai Kryukov as Rzhanov
- Nina Menshikova as Sergei's mother
- Vyacheslav Nevinny as sailor
