= Alexandra Prokofyeva =

Russian actress

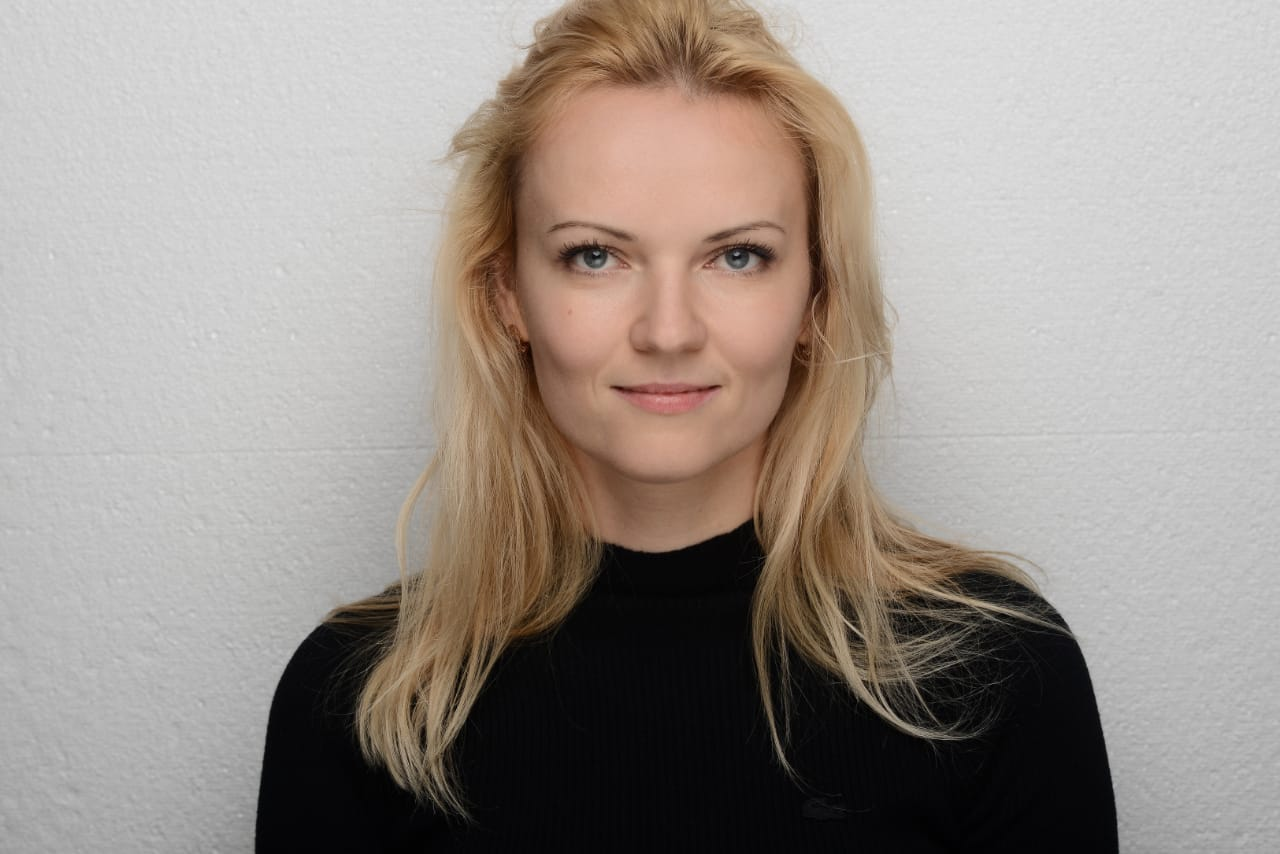
- Born: Alexandra Sergeyevna Prokofyeva; 25 January 1985 (age 41); Yuzhno-Sakhalinsk, Russian SFSR, Soviet Union
- Occupation: Actress
- Years active: 2007–present
- Spouse: Evgeny Kolesnikov

Alexandra Sergeyevna Prokofyeva (Russian: Александра Сергеевна Прокофьева; born 25 January 1985) is a Russian actress.

== Biography ==
Prokofyeva was born on 25 January 1985 in Yuzhno-Sakhalinsk. She graduated from high school in Novoaleksandrovsk and in 2003, she moved to Moscow.

In 2007, Prokofyeva graduated from the Boris Shchukin Theatre Institute. In the same year, she won the Golden Leaf Award in the Best Actress category for her role as Sophia in the play Woe from Wit. From 2007 to 2012 she performed at the Vakhtangov Theatre. Since 2009, she has been working in the Marathon Theatre. She made her film debut in 2007 with a starring role in Life Unawares. Then she mostly starred in television series. In 2011, she played Anna German in the film "Anna German. Echo of love". She also starred in the films "Friday" (2016) and "Frontier" (2018).

In 2017, the short film One Day was filmed, which became Prokofyeva's directorial debut. In 2018, the film was shown at the International Short Film Festival in Chennai (India) and in 2019 at the St. Anna Festival.

== Personal life ==
On 7 November 2013, Prokofyeva married basketball player Evgeny Kolesnikov. The couple have two sons, Evgeny and Mikhail.
