= Alfred Bauer Prize =

Discontinued award presented by the Berlin International Film Festival

The Alfred Bauer Prize was an annual film award, presented by the Berlin International Film Festival, as part of its Silver Bear series of awards, to a film that "opens new perspectives on cinematic art". The prize was suspended in 2020 after it was revealed that the founding director of the festival Alfred Bauer had been an active high-ranking Nazi closely involved in a propaganda organisation set up by Joseph Goebbels. The award was presented by the international jury under the title “The Silver Bear – 70th Berlinale”, for that year edition of the festival.

== Winners ==
Year	English Title	Original Title	Director(s)	Production Country
1987 (37th)	Mauvais Sang		Léos Carax	France
1989 (39th)	The Servant	Слуга	Vadim Abdrashitov	Soviet Union
1990 (40th)	The Guard	Караул	Aleksandr Rogozhkin	Soviet Union
1992 (42nd)	Infinitas	Бесконечность	Marlen Khutsiev	Russia
1994 (44th)	Hwa-Om-Kyung		Jang Sun-woo	South Korea
1996 (46th)	Strangled Lives	Vite strozzate	Ricky Tognazzi	Italy, France
1997 (47th)	Romeo + Juliet		Baz Luhrmann	United States
1998 (48th)	Hold You Tight	愈快樂愈墮落	Stanley Kwan	Hong Kong
1999 (49th)	Karnaval		Thomas Vincent	France
2000 (50th)	Boy's Choir	Dokuritsu shônen gasshô-dan	Akira Ogata	Japan
2001 (51st)	La Ciénaga		Lucrecia Martel	Argentina, Spain
2002 (52nd)	Baader		Christopher Roth	Germany
2003 (53rd)	Hero	英雄	Zhang Yimou	Hong Kong, China
2004 (54th)	Maria Full of Grace	María, llena eres de gracia	Joshua Marston	United States, Colombia
2005 (55th)	The Wayward Cloud	天邊一朵雲	Tsai Ming-liang	Taiwan, France
2006 (56th)	The Minder	El Custodio	Rodrigo Moreno	Argentina, Germany, France
2007 (57th)	I'm a Cyborg, But That's OK	싸이보그지만 괜찮아	Park Chan-wook	South Korea
2008 (58th)	Lake Tahoe		Fernando Eimbcke	Mexico
2009 (59th)	Giant	Gigante	Adrián Biniez	Uruguay, Germany, Argentina, Netherlands
2009 (59th)	Tatarak		Andrzej Wajda	Poland
2010 (60th)	If I Want to Whistle, I Whistle	Eu când vreau să fluier, fluier	Florin Șerban	Romania, Sweden
2011 (61st)	If Not Us, Who?	Wer wenn nicht wir	Andres Veiel	Germany
2012 (62nd)	Tabu		Miguel Gomes	Portugal, Germany, Brazil, France
2013 (63rd)	Vic and Flo Saw a Bear	Vic et Flo ont vu un ours	Denis Côté	Canada
2014 (64th)	Life of Riley	Aimer, boire et chanter	Alain Resnais	France
2015 (65th)	Ixcanul		Jayro Bustamante	Guatemala, France
2016 (66th)	A Lullaby to the Sorrowful Mystery	Hele sa Hiwagang Hapis	Lav Diaz	Philippines, Singapore
2017 (67th)	Spoor	Pokot	Agnieszka Holland	Poland, Germany, Czech Republic, Sweden, Slovak Republic
2018 (68th)	The Heiresses	Las herederas	Marcelo Martinessi	Paraguay, Uruguay, Germany, Brazil, Norway, France
2019 (69th)	System Crasher	Systemsprenger	Nora Fingscheidt	Germany
2020 (70th)	Delete History	Effacer l'historique	Benoît Delépine & Gustave Kervern	France, Belgium
