= Waiting for Love (film) =

Waiting for Love Любимая женщина механика Гаврилова
- Original film poster
- Directed by: Pyotr Todorovsky
- Written by: Sergei Bodrov
- Starring: Lyudmila Gurchenko; Sergey Shakurov; Svetlana Ponomareva; Natalya Nazarova
- Production company: Mosfilm
- Release date: 1981
- Running time: 79 minutes
- Country: Soviet Union
- Language: Russian

Waiting for Love (Russian: Любимая женщина механика Гаврилова, romanized: Lyubimaya zhenshchina mekhanika Gavrilova) is a 1981 Soviet romantic comedy film directed by Pyotr Todorovsky starring Ludmila Gurchenko and Sergei Shakurov. The film is set in the Ukrainian city of Odessa.

== Synopsis ==
The film shows one day in the life of Rita, an 38-year-old woman on the supposed day of her wedding. In the morning she reaches the registry office, where the ship mechanic Gavrilov is supposed to marry her, but he does not show up. Rita struggles between hope and despair.

== Cast ==
- Lyudmila Gurchenko as Margarita Solovyova, Rita
- Sergey Shakurov as Lev Gavrilov, Rita's groom
- Svetlana Ponomareva as Tanya, Rita's daughter
- Natalya Nazarova as Lusya, hairdresser, Rita's friend
- Yevgeniy Yevstigneyev as Rita's uncle
- Stanislav Sokolov as Viktor, lawyer, Lusya's husband
- Vsevolod Shilovsky as Pasha, photographer
- Anatoly Vasilyev as Slava, physician for the recruitment commission
- Mikhail Svetin as Vitya, musician, theater worker
- Alexander Goloborodko as watcher
- Lyudmila Arinina as waitress
- Vadim Alexandrov as client of the studio
- Vasily Vekshin as passer-by
- Pavel Vinnik as episode
- Inna Vykhodtsev as mother with milk
- David Giorgobiani as Rezo
- Lily Yevstigneyeva as woman with underwear
- Lia Kapanadze as Rezo's mother
- Olesya Malakhova as episode
- Ivan Matveev as grandfather with a horse
- Andrey Nikolaev as groom-morjachok
- Mikhail Rozanov as groom
- Galina Samokhina as visitor lawyer
- Elena Sotnikova as bride
- Galina Starikova as episode
- Shota Skhirtladze as Georgian-driver
- Zurab Tsintskiladze as episode
