= Yevgeny Yevstigneyev =

Soviet actor (1926–1992)

- Евгений Евстигнеев
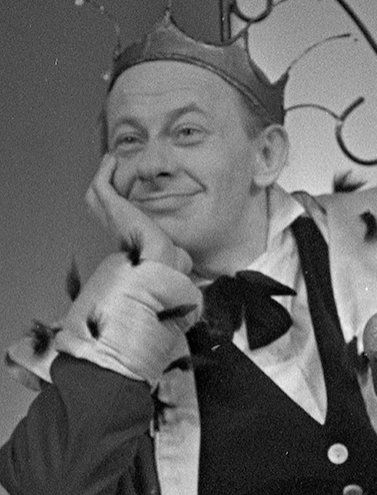
- Yevstigneyev in 1961
- Born: Yevgeny Aleksandrovich Yevstigneyev; 9 October 1926; Nizhny Novgorod, Russian SFSR, Soviet Union
- Died: 4 March 1992 (aged 65); London, United Kingdom
- Resting place: Novodevichy Cemetery, Moscow
- Occupations: Actor, theatre pedagogue
- Years active: 1951-1992
- Spouse(s): Galina Volchek (1955—1964); Lilia Yevstigneyeva (1966—1986); Irina Tsivina (1986—1992)
- Children: Denis Yevstigneyev; Maria Selyanskaya

Yevgeny Aleksandrovich Yevstigneyev (Russian: Евгений Александрович Евстигнеев; 9 October 1926 – 4 March 1992) was a prominent Soviet and Russian stage and film actor, theatre pedagogue, one of the founders of the Moscow Sovremennik Theatre. He was named People's Artist of the USSR in 1983 and awarded the USSR State Prize in 1974.

== Early years ==
Yevgeny Yevstigneyev was born on 9 October 1926 in Nizhny Novgorod, Russian SFSR (modern-day Nizhny Novgorod Oblast of Russia) into a poor working-class family and spent his childhood at the outskirts, in the Volodarsky village. He was a late child of Maria Ivanovna Yevstigneyeva (née Chernishova), a milling machine operator, and a metallurgist, Aleksandr Mikhailovich Yevstigneyev who was twenty years older than her and who died when Yevgeny was six years old. Maria Ivanovna married another man who died when Yevgeny turned seventeen.

By that time, he had already finished seven classes of secondary school and applied as a mechanic to the same factory where his mother was working. Yet he dreamed of acting, just like his elder half-brother who served as a comedy actor in the local theatre and died very young, which made his mother believe that it was a bad sign; she asked the recruiting manager to keep her son's documents and didn't let him leave.

During that period, Yevgeny became interested in jazz and started playing drums with a jazz band that performed in cinemas. There he was noticed by the director of the Gorky Theatre School (known as Y. A. Yevstigneyev Theatre School of Nizhny Novgorod today) who invited him to join. Yevgeny passed the entrance exams in 1947 and graduated in 1951.

== Career ==
He became an actor at the Vladimir Regional Drama Theatre where he served from 1951 to 1954. He quickly rose to fame as the most talented and versatile actor of Vladimir, performing 23 roles in total. In 1954, a Moscow Art Theatre actor Mikhail Zimin who had previously studied with Yevstigneyev returned for him and asked to join the Nemirovich-Danchenko School-Studio at MKhAT. Yevgeny was accepted and went straight to the third course, graduating in 1956 and becoming an actor of the Moscow Art Theatre where he served for a year.

In 1957, a number of young MAT actors including Yevgeny Yevstigneyev and his close friend Oleg Yefremov founded the Sovremennik Theatre where he served until 1970. The role of the king in Evgeny Schwartz's play Naked King, which was staged in 1960 by Yefremov, became his most recognized stage role since. Soon he performed in the leading role of a Young Pioneer camp administrator in the comedy movie Welcome, or No Trespassing. It turned into a big hit and gave a great push to his successful movie career which lasted for 35 years and included over 100 roles.

Possessing a gift of a comic and dramatic actor, Yevstigneyev was popular. His appearance in any film or play guaranteed it a success with viewers. Among his performances was the portrayal of Professor Preobrazhensky in Heart of a Dog.

In 1970, Oleg Yefremov was appointed the main director of the Moscow Art Theatre and left Sovremennik. Yevstigneyev followed him along with some other actors, although, according to his colleague Igor Kvasha, he was against this move and tried to convince everyone to stay at Sovremennik. He performed in MAT up until 1988. From 1976 to 1986 he also taught acting at the Moscow Art Theatre School, becoming a professor in 1977.

== Last years ==
During the late 1980s he started experiencing heart problems and survived a heart attack. In 1988 he asked Yefremov not to give him additional roles. Yefremov then suggested him to retire. This deeply hurt Yevstigneyev's feelings and he left the theatre. During 1990–1992 he performed in several plays in combination companies. He also starred in an epic historical mini-series Yermak (released posthumously in 1996) as Ivan the Terrible which became his last role.

In 1991, Nikolai Gubenko, at the time a Soviet Ministry of Culture, contacted a famous British cardiologist Thomas Lewis and sent Yevstigneyev and his wife to London. On 4 March 1992, after an examination, Dr. Lewis told Yevstigneyev that he would perform surgery, but the actor had no chances. This greatly affected Yevstigneyev, and in five minutes he survived another heart attack which led to coma and his death in several hours.

Yevgeny Yevstigneyev was transported back to Moscow and buried at the Novodevichy Cemetery. He was survived by his third wife, an actress Irina Tsivina (born 1963), his son from the first marriage to Galina Volchek – a prominent Russian film director and cinematographer Denis Yevstigneyev (born 1961), and a daughter from his second marriage to an actress Lilia Yevstigneyeva – Maria Selyanskaya (born 1968) who performs at the Sovremennik Theatre.

In his hometown of Nizhny Novgorod, a bronze monument to the actor was erected in September 2006 on Teatralnaya Square (next to the Gorky Nizhny Novgorod Drama Theatre). In September 2021, a sculptural group was also installed near the Nizhny Novgorod Institute of Traumatology and Orthopedics: Yevgeny Aleksandrovich is depicted as Professor Preobrazhensky, along with the dog Sharik. The sculpture symbolizes the gratitude of the people of Nizhny Novgorod to doctors.

== Selected filmography ==
- Duel (Russian: Дуэль, 1957) as Captain Peterson
- Ballad of a Soldier (Баллада о солдате, 1959) as a truck driver
- Man Follows the Sun (Человек идёт за солнцем, 1962) as Nikolai, motorcycle racer
- Nine Days in One Year (Девять дней одного года, 1962) as Nikolai Ivanovich
- Nevermore (Никогда, 1962) as Aleksandr Aleksin - new director of the shipyard
- Strictly Business (Деловые люди, 1962) as Citizen (voice)
- They Conquer the Skies (Им покоряется небо, 1963) as Head Constructor Ivan Sergeyevich
- Welcome, or No Trespassing (Добро пожаловать, или Посторонним вход воспрещён, 1964) as Dynin
- Faithfulness (Верность, 1965) as Ivan Terentievich
- The Hyperboloid of Engineer Garin (Гиперболоид инженера Гарина, 1965) as an engineer Pyotr Garin
- The Bridge Is Built (Строится мост, 1966) as Sinajsky
- Beware of the Car (Берегись автомобиля, 1966) as a theatre director
- Wings (Крылья, 1966) as Misha
- The Ugly Story (Скверный анекдот, 1966) as Pralinsky
- Older Sister (Старшая сестра, 1967) as Ogorodnikov
- Stewardess (Стюардесса, 1967, TV Movie) as a drunken passenger
- The Little Golden Calf (Золотой телёнок, 1968) as Alexander Koreiko
- Bare et liv – historien om Fridtjof Nansen (1968) as Georgy Chicherin
- Zigzag of Success (Зигзаг удачи, 1968) as Ivan Kalachev
- The Flight (Бег, 1970) as Paramon Korzukhin
- All The King's Men (Вся королевская рать, 1971, TV Mini-Series) as Larson
- Property of the Republic (Достояние республики, 1972) as Carl Genrikhovich Vitol
- Grandads-Robbers (Старики-разбойники, 1972) as Valentin Vorobyov
- Fitil (Фитиль, 1972, TV Series) as a drunkard
- Commander of the Lucky Pike (Командир счастливой «Щуки», 1972) as Stepan Lukich
- Seventeen Moments of Spring (Семнадцать мгновений весны, 1973, TV Mini-Series) as Professor Pleischner
- Privalov's Millions (Приваловские миллионы, 1973) as Ivan Yakovlevich
- Unbelievable Adventures of Italians in Russia (Невероятные приключения итальянцев в России, 1974) as a lame Italian
- Fitil (Фитиль, 1976) as an official
- Wounded Game (Подранки, 1977) as a watchman
- Story of an Unknown Actor (1977) as Pavel Goryayev
- The Nose (Нос, 1977, TV Movie) as an official at the post office
- About the Little Red Riding Hood (Про Красную Шапочку, 1977, TV Movie) as an astrologer
- Family Circumstances (По семейным обстоятельствам, 1978) as Nikolai Pavlovich
- The Meeting Place Cannot Be Changed (Место встречи изменить нельзя, 1979, TV Mini-Series) as Ruchechnik
- Do Not Part with Your Beloved (С любимыми не расставайтесь, 1980) as Homak
- The Old New Year (Cтаpый Нoвый гoд, 1981) as Ivan Adamych
- Waiting for Love (Любимая женщина механика Гаврилова, 1982) as Rita's uncle
- I Still Love, I Still Hope (Ещё люблю, ещё надеюсь, 1983) as Vasiliy Vasilyevich
- We Are from Jazz (Мы из джаза, 1983) as Papa
- Demidovs (Демидовы, 1984) as Nikita Antufiev-Demidov
- And Life, and Tears, and Love (И жизнь, и слёзы, и любовь, 1984) as Stepanych
- I Still Love, I Still Hope (Ещё люблю, ещё надеюсь, 1985) as Vasiliy Vasilyevich
- Man with an Accordion (Человек с аккордеоном, 1985) as Ivan Lopatin
- Winter Evening in Gagra (Зимний вечер в Гаграх, 1985) as Aleksey Ivanovich Beglov
- The Pathfinder (Следопыт, 1987) as Sahen
- She with a Broom, He in a Black Hat (Она с метлой, он в чёрной шляпе, 1987) as Raven (voice)
- Gardemarines ahead! (Гардемарины, вперёд!, 1988, TV Mini-Series) as Alexey Bestuzhev-Ryumin
- Moonzund (Моонзунд, 1988) as Nikolai Essen
- Zerograd (Город Зеро, 1988) as a museum curator
- Heart of a Dog (Собачье сердце, 1988, TV Movie) as Professor Philip Philipovich Preobrazhensky
- Tree Sticks! (Ёлки-палки!, 1988) as Yuri Viktorovich
- New Adventures of a Yankee in King Arthur's Court (Новые приключения янки при дворе короля Артура, 1988) as an archbishop
- The Feasts of Belshazzar, or a Night with Stalin (Пиры Валтасара, или Ночь со Сталиным, 1989) as Mikhail Kalinin
- His Nickname Is Beast (По прозвищу «Зверь», 1990) as The Old Convict
- Sons of Bitches (Сукины дети, 1991) as Andrey Ivanovich Nanaytsev
- Viva Gardes-Marines! (Виват, гардемарины!, 1991) as Alexey Bestuzhev-Ryumin
- The Voice in the Wilderness (Глас вопиющий, 1991) as Hangman
- Gardes-Marines III (Гардемарины-III, 1992) as Alexey Bestuzhev-Ryumin
- Dreams of Russia (Сны о России, 1992) as Bush, the court gardener
- Yermak (Ермак, 1996, TV Mini-Series) as Ivan the Terrible (voiced by Sergei Artsibashev) (final appearance)
