= Retro Threesome =

Russian romantic drama film

- Russian: Ретро втроём
- Directed by: Pyotr Todorovsky
- Produced by: Mira Todorovskaya
- Starring: Elena Yakovleva; Sergey Makovetsky; Evgeniy Sidikhin; E. Boginskaja; Elvira Bolgova
- Cinematography: Nikolay Nemolyaev
- Edited by: Alla Strelnikova
- Music by: Alexei Aigui
- Release date: 1998
- Country: Russia
- Language: Russian

Retro Threesome (Russian: Ретро втроём) is a 1998 Russian romantic drama film directed by Pyotr Todorovsky.

== Plot ==
The film tells about a stylish and modern woman who is drawn into the past and she begins to take photos in retro style. But faced with a serious problem, she turns into flint.

== Cast ==
- Elena Yakovleva as Rita
- Sergey Makovetsky as Sergey
- Evgeniy Sidikhin as Kostya
- E. Boginskaja
- Elvira Bolgova
- Ekaterina Dvigubskaya as Zina
- Vladimir Episkoposyan
- Tatjana Ivtschenko
- Yuri Kolokolnikov
- A. Konev
