= Cloud-Paradise =

- French film poster
- Directed by: Nikolai Dostal
- Produced by: Alexander Mikhailov
- Starring: Andrei Zhigalov; Sergey Batalov; Irina Rozanova
- Cinematography: Yuri Nevsky; Pyotr Serebryakov
- Music by: Alexander Goldstein
- Release date: 1990
- Running time: 79 minutes
- Country: Soviet Union
- Language: Russian

Cloud-Paradise (Russian: Облако-рай, romanized: Oblako-ray) is a 1990 Soviet comedy-drama film directed by Nikolai Dostal. It was voted best film of 1992 by 90 Russian critics.

== Plot ==
In a small provincial town, early in the morning, Kolya encounters his friend Fedya, wearily and indifferently. Wanting to attract attention, Kolya says that he is going to leave, ostensibly, to the Far East. His decision wins unanimous support. Kolya becomes a local hero, all the neighbors assist in his training. Kolya sells his furniture off, writes a resignation letter and leaves his hometown on a bus. He is on his way to nowhere.

== Cast ==
- Andrei Zhigalov as Kolya
- Sergey Batalov as Fedya
- Irina Rozanova as Valya, Fedya's wife
- Alla Kliouka as Natalia
- Anna Ovsyannikova as Tatiana Ivanovna, Natalia's mother
- Vladimir Tolokonnikov as Felomeev
- Lev Borisov as Philipp Makarovich, neighbor
- Aleksandr Chislov as mate of Felomeev

== Awards and nominations ==
- Prize For the destruction of a barrier between your favorite movies and cinema for all at the first festival Kinotavr in 1991.
- Golden Aries Award in 1992
- Silver Leopard Special Grand Jury Prize, Second Prize, youth jury prize of the International Confederation of experimental film and Prize of the Ecumenical Jury in the Locarno International Film Festival in 1991
- Grand Prix II MFEC (France)
- Special Jury Prize cast of young actors in the 1991 Geneva Film Festival
