= Pyotr Todorovsky =

Russian film director, screenwriter and cinematographer

- Пётр Тодоровский
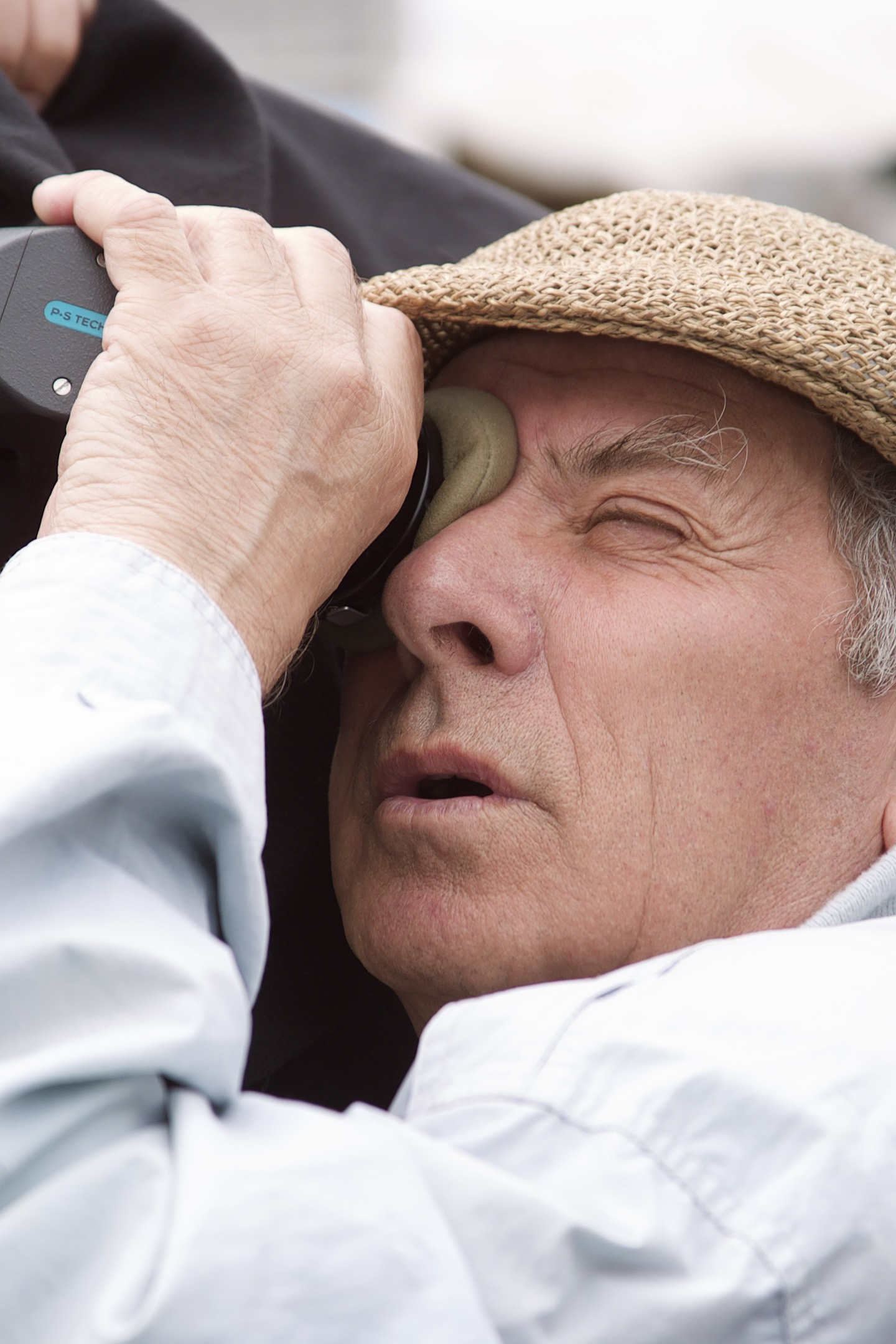
- Todorovsky in 2001
- Born: 26 August 1925; Bobrynets, Ukrainian SSR, Soviet Union (now Ukraine)
- Died: 24 May 2013 (aged 87); Moscow, Russia
- Resting place: Novodevichy Cemetery, Moscow
- Occupations: Film director, screenwriter
- Years active: 1962–2013
- Notable work: Wartime Romance (1983); Intergirl (1989)

Pyotr Yefimovich Todorovsky (Russian: Пётр Ефи́мович Тодоро́вский, Ukrainian: Петро Юхимович Тодоровський, 26 August 1925 – 24 May 2013) was a Russian film director, screenwriter, and cinematographer.

His son Valery Todorovsky and grandson Pyotr Todorovsky Jr. both became film directors.

== Biography ==
=== Early years and WWII ===
Pyotr Todorovsky was born on August 26, 1925, in Bobrynets, Zinovievsky district of the USSR, into a Jewish family. He became the second son of Efim Gilievich Todorovsky and Rozalia Tsalevna Ostrovskaya, after the elder brother Ilya. Pyotr had only finished 9 classes when the World War II forced his family to evacuate first to Stalingrad, then to Novouzensky District of the Saratov Oblast.

Todorovsky joined the Red Army during World War II in April 1943, first as cadet of the Saratov Higher Military Engineering School of Chemical Defence, then, in August 1944, he was promoted to commander in the 2nd Rifle Battalion of the 93rd Rifle Regiment, 76th Rifle Division, part of the 47th Army of the 1st Belorussian Front. Todorovsky took part in the liberation of Warsaw and the Battle in Berlin. He met the end of the war near Schönhausen. After the war, he served in the military garrison near Kostroma, only then he was able to complete his school studies and graduate.

For more than 60 years, Todorovsky had been searching for his brother Ilya who was called to arms at the very beginning of the fights on the Eastern Front in 1941. A graduate of Kiev Artillery School, Ilya reached the rank of senior lieutenant and was a platoon commander. He disappeared in 1942. To hundreds of inquiries and applications, the family invariably received the reply from officials that there was no information about the brother. Only in 2004, a hand-written document was discovered that mentioned Todorovsky Ilya Yefimovich among the killed on January 21, 1942, in fights near the village Vodosye, Leningrad region.

=== Career ===
Over the course of his career, which spanned more than 50 years, Todorovsky had filmed many movies that achieved cult status in the USSR and Russia. Not only did he create sharp and honest war films, based on his personal experience, but later on he also made insightful observations of the changing society: a transition of the Khruschev years to Brezhnevite stagnation, followed by Perestroika and groundshaking shifts when Soviet system was opening up to the outside world. Todorovsky also was an amateur musician, he scored his films himself and composed songs for some of them.

In 1949, Pyotr Todorovsky entered the Gerasimov Institute of Cinematography. In 1954, he went to work at the Moldova-Film and made his cinematographer's debut in 1955 with Moldavian Tunes. In 1956 he worked as a cameraman on the set of Spring on Zarechnaya Street, a cult film by Marlen Khutsiev. Todorovsky filmed several documentaries for Moldova Film and in 1962, he released his directorial debut, Nevermore.

In 1955-1965, he worked at the Odesa Film Studio, then moved on to work at the Mosfilm.

In 1965, his Faithfulness received Best First Work Award at the 26th Venice International Film Festival. Inside the USSR, it was his 1967 movie Magician that brought Todorovsky to prominence. Created in the neorealist style, it portrayed the protagonist at odds with reality.

His 1981 film Waiting for Love starring Lyudmila Gurchenko secured him all-Soviet fame.

Two years later, his 1983 drama Wartime Romance was shortlisted for the best foreign language film Oscar in 1985. Inna Churikova, the leading actress, won the Berlin Film Festival's best actress Silver Bear for her performance in the film.

Todorovsky's early 1980s melodramas gained him wide popularity in the Soviet Union. They have been described as "delightfully unpretentious comedies, humorous and touching at the same time". His best-known film, Intergirl, was released in 1989, and became a box office hit: it was watched by 40 million viewers in cinemas. Being the first Soviet film about prostitution, even with very modest sex scenes, it caused a huge scandal for covering the taboo topic, but enjoyed huge popularity with the audience as it captured the zeitgeist of the perestroika era with gritty realism. The film won numerous awards, including the Special Jury Prize at the Tokyo International Film Festival. For this role, the lead Elena Yakovleva won a prestigious Russian award Nika as Best actress.

His next film Encore, Once More Encore! (1992) presents a grim picture of moral prostitution in a dull, provincial garrison town.

Todorovsky succumbed to a long illness on May 23, 2013.

== Awards ==
Todorovsky was named a People's Artist of Russia in 1985. Encore, Once More, Encore! won the 1992 Nika Award for Best Film. Wartime Romance (1983) was nominated for the Academy Award for Best Foreign Language Film. It was also entered into the 34th Berlin International Film Festival, where Inna Churikova won the Silver Bear for Best Actress.

== Filmography ==
- Spring on Zarechnaya Street (1956)
- Nevermore (1962)
- Faithfulness (1965)
- Magician (1967)
- Urban Romance (1970)
- It Was in May (1970)
- The Last Victim (1975)
- Waiting for Love (1981)
- Wartime Romance (1984)
- Through Main Street wih an Orchestra (1986)
- Intergirl (1989)
- Encore, Once More Encore! (1992)
- What a Wonderful Game (1995)
- Retro Threesome (1998)
- Life Is Full of Fun (2001)
- Riorita (2008)

== Literature ==
- Hill, Stephen P. (1967). "The Soviet Film Today". Film Quarterly. 20 (4): 33–52. doi:10.2307/1210762. JSTOR 1210762.
