= 42nd Berlin International Film Festival =

1992 film festival in Berlin, Germany

- Festival poster
- Opening film: The Inner Circle
- Location: Berlin, Germany
- Founded: 1951
- Awards: Golden Bear: Grand Canyon
- No. of films: 480 films
- Festival date: 13 – 24 February 1992
- Website: Website

Berlin International Film Festival chronology
- 43rd 41st

The 42nd annual Berlin International Film Festival was held from 13 to 24 February 1992. The festival opened with The Inner Circle by Andrei Konchalovsky.

The Golden Bear was awarded to American film Grand Canyon directed by Lawrence Kasdan.

The retrospective dedicated to Babelsberg Studios films was shown at the festival.

== Jury ==
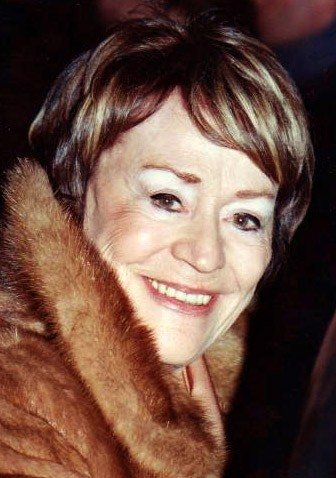
Annie Girardot, Jury President

The following people were announced as being on the jury for the festival:

- Annie Girardot, French actress - Jury President
- Charles Champlin, American writer and film critic
- Sylvia Chang, Taiwanese actress and filmmaker
- Ildikó Enyedi, Hungarian filmmaker
- Irving N. Ivers, Canadian 20th Century Fox executive
- Wolfgang Klaue, German archivist, former president of FIAF
- Fernando Lara, Spanish film critic and writer
- Eldar Shengelaya, Georgian filmmaker
- Dahlia Shapira, Israeli film distributor
- Michael Verhoeven, German actor, filmmaker and producer
- Susannah York, British actress

== Official Selection ==
=== Main Competition ===
The following films were in competition for the Golden Bear and Silver Bear awards:

English title	Original title	Director(s)	Country
The Beloved	Rcheuli	Mikheil Kalatozishvili	Russia
An Independent Life	Самостоятельная жизнь	Vitali Kanevsky	Russia
Bugsy		Barry Levinson	United States
Cape Fear		Martin Scorsese	United States
Céline		Jean-Claude Brisseau	France
Center Stage	阮玲玉	Stanley Kwan	Hong Kong
Dead Again		Kenneth Branagh	United States
The Frontier	La frontera	Ricardo Larraín	Spain, Chile
Gas Food Lodging		Allison Anders	United States
Grand Canyon		Lawrence Kasdan	United States
Gudrun		Hans W. Geißendörfer	Germany
Il Capitano: A Swedish Requiem	Il capitano	Jan Troell	Sweden, Finland, Germany
Infinitas		Marlen Khutsiev	Russia
The Inner Circle		Andrei Konchalovsky	Italy, United States, Russia
The Last Days of Chez Nous		Gillian Armstrong	Australia
Light Sleeper		Paul Schrader	United States
The Long Winter	El largo invierno	Jaime Camino	Spain, France
Luminous Moss	ひかりごけ	Kei Kumai	Japan
Naked Lunch		David Cronenberg	Canada, United Kingdom, Japan
Nothing But Lies	Rien que des mensonges	Paule Muret	France, Switzerland
Prince of Shadows	Beltenebros	Pilar Miró	Spain, Netherlands
Rising to the Bait	Der Brocken	Vadim Glowna	Germany
Sweet Emma, Dear Böbe	Édes Emma, drága Böbe – vázlatok, aktok	István Szabó	Hungary
A Tale of Winter	Conte d'hiver	Eric Rohmer	France
Tous les matins du monde		Alain Corneau	France
Utz		George Sluizer	Germany, Italy, United Kingdom

== Official Awards ==
The following prizes were awarded by the Jury:

- Golden Bear: Grand Canyon by Lawrence Kasdan
- Silver Bear – Special Jury Prize: Sweet Emma, Dear Böbe by István Szabó
- Silver Bear for Best Director: Jan Troell for Il capitano
- Silver Bear for Best Actress: Maggie Cheung for Center Stage
- Silver Bear for Best Actor: Armin Mueller-Stahl for Utz
- Silver Bear for an outstanding single achievement: Ricardo Larraín for La frontera
- Silver Bear for an outstanding artistic contribution: Beltenebros
- Honourable Mention: Gudrun by Hans W. Geißendörfer
- Alfred-Bauer Prize: Infinitas by Marlen Khutsiev

=== Berlinale Camera ===
- Hal Roach

== Independent Awards ==
=== FIPRESCI Award ===
- A Tale of Winter by Eric Rohmer
