= Vsevolod Shilovsky =

Russian actor and director (1938–2025)

- Всеволод Шиловский
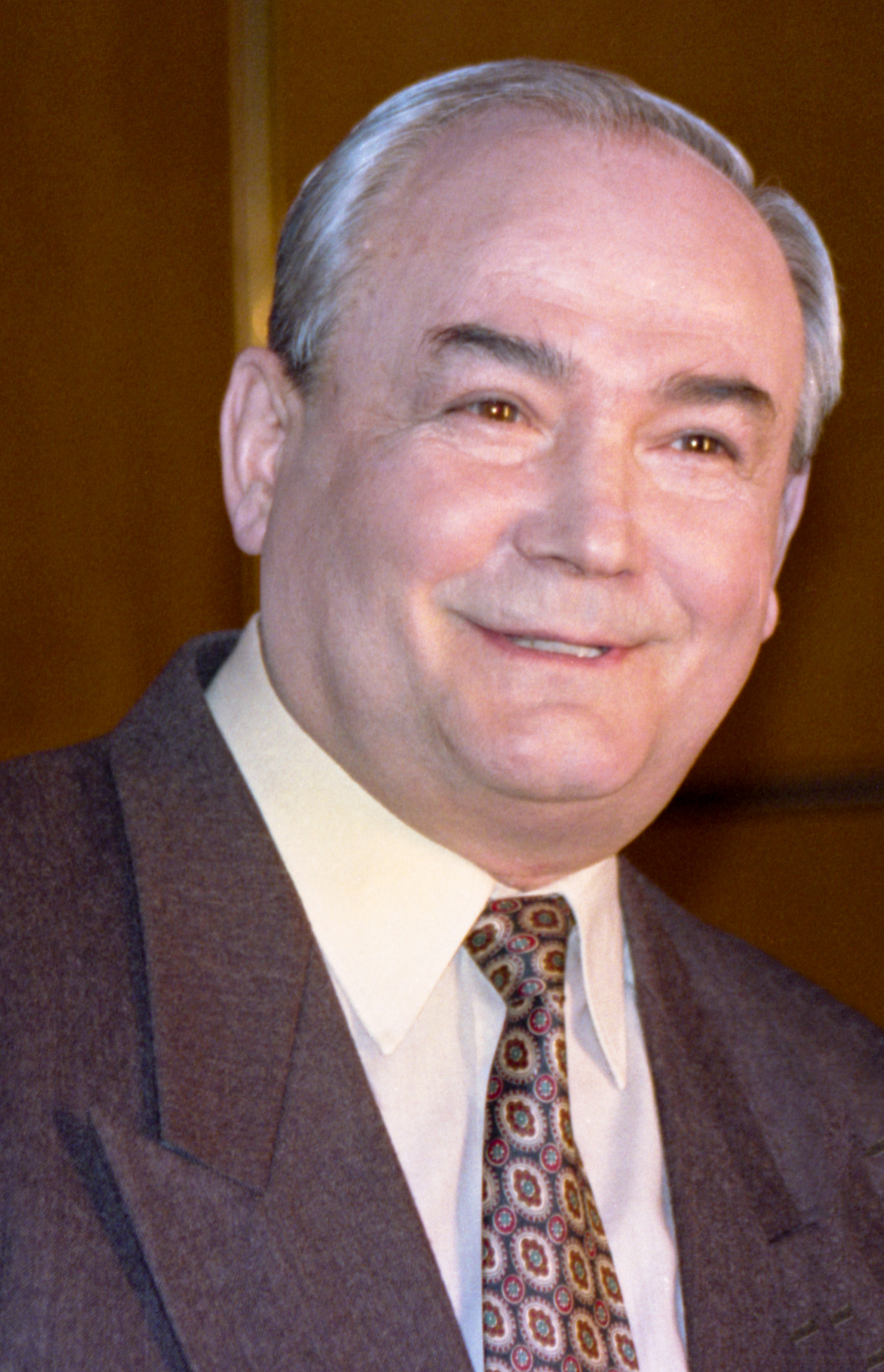
- Shilovsky in 2000
- Born: Vsevolod Nikolaevich Shilovsky; 3 June 1938; Moscow, Russian SFSR, USSR
- Died: 26 November 2025 (aged 87); Moscow, Russia
- Occupations: Actor; director
- Years active: 1961–2025
- Website: shilovski.kulichki.net

Vsevolod Nikolaevich Shilovsky (Russian: Все́волод Никола́евич Шило́вский; 3 June 1938 – 26 November 2025) was a Soviet and Russian film and theater actor and film director. In 1986, he was awarded People's Artist of the RSFSR, the Order of Friendship in 1997, and the Order of Honor in 2015.

== Life and career ==
Shilovsky was born on 3 June 1938. His father, Nikolay Shilovsky, graduated from the Conservatory in composition and the Zhukovsky Air Force Engineering Academy, led the factory was the chief of station Northeast Passage Tiksi and was a Member of the Great Patriotic War.

During the Great Patriotic War, Vsevolod with his mother was evacuated to Kazan; his mother worked in the aircraft engine plant. He graduated from the Moscow Art Theater School (course of Alexander Karev). In 1961–1987, he worked at the Moscow Art Theatre. From 1987, he focused exclusively on the cinema; in some films, he participated as a director. He was the head of the acting studio in Gerasimov Institute of Cinematography.

Shilovsky died on 26 November 2025, at the age of 87.

== Family ==
- His wife Natalia Kipriyanovna Tsekhanovskaya, harpist.
  - Son: Ilya Vsevolodovich Shilovsky (born 1970), a Russian director. Granddaughter: Aglaia Ilinichna Shilovskaya (1993), actress
  - Son: Pavel Vsevolodovich Shilovsky (born 1974), a film producer.

== Selected filmography ==
- 1965 – Our House (Наш дом) as bus passenger
- 1969 – Director (Директор) as Ptashkin
- 1972 – Day by Day (День за днём) as Zhora
- 1977 – Destiny (Судьба) as Hans
- 1977 – Investigation Held by ZnaToKi (Следствие ведут ЗнаТоКи) as Semyon Kholin
- 1981 – Waiting for Love (Любимая женщина механика Гаврилова) as Pasha
- 1982 – Golos (Голос) as Cameraman
- 1983 – Love by Request (Влюблён по собственному желанию) as Nikolai
- 1983 – Wartime Romance (Военно-полевой роман) as Grisha
- 1986 – The Life of Klim Samgin (Жизнь Клима Самгина) as Zaкhar Petrovich Berdnikov
- 1986 – Jaguar (Ягуар) as Major
- 1986 – The Prisoner of Château d'If (Узник замка Иф) as Gaspard Caderousse
- 1986 – How to Become Happy (Как стать счастливым) as editor-in-chief
- 1988 – Bright Personality (Светлая личность) as Abel Dobroglasov
- 1989 – Intergirl (Интердевочка) as Nikolay Platonovich Zaytsev
- 1999 – Kamenskaya (Каменская) as Colonel Pavlov
- 2005 – Popsa (Попса) as Efim Ilyich
- 2007 – Life Unawares (Жизнь врасплох) as Sidor Kamilovich
- 2011 – Once Upon a Time There Lived a Simple Woman (Жила-была одна баба) as Holy Father Yeremey
- 2011 – The Life and Adventures of Mishka Yaponchik (Жизнь и приключения Мишки Япончика) as Lev Barsky
- 2015 – Song of Songs (Ukrainian: Пісня пісень) as Melamed
