= Probation (1960 film) =

- Russian poster
- Russian: Испытательный срок
- Directed by: Vladimir Gerasimov
- Written by: Igor Bolgarin
- Starring: Oleg Yefremov; Oleg Tabakov; Vyacheslav Nevinny; Boris Novikov
- Music by: Antonio Spadavecchia
- Production company: Mosfilm
- Release date: 1960
- Running time: 95 min.
- Country: Soviet Union
- Language: Russian

Probation (Russian: Испытательный срок, Ispytatelny srok) is a 1960 Soviet crime drama film directed by Vladimir Gerasimov.

== Plot ==
The year is 1923. Zaitsev and Yegorov get jobs in criminal investigation. Yegorov must keep an eye on the documents, while Zaitsev is responsible for fighting with the criminals. And suddenly they get a case of a pharmacist's suicide...

== Cast ==
- Oleg Yefremov as senior commissioner Ulyan Grigoryevich Zhur
- Oleg Tabakov as Sasha Yegorov
- Tamara Loginova as Katya, Yegorov's sister
- Vyacheslav Nevinny as Sergei Zaitsev
- Boris Novikov as orderly Vorobeichik
- Yevgeni Urbansky as chief of criminal investigation department Kurychyov
- Mikhail Semenikhin as Afanasy Solovyov, Zhur's friend
- Pavel Vinnik as Grigory Mitrofanovich Frinyov, apothecary
- Tatyana Lavrova as Varya
- Yelena Maksimova as crime victim
- Valentina Tokarskaya as croupier in casino "Calcutta"
- Albert Filozov as Komsomol organizer on subbotnik (uncredited)
