= Wartime Romance =

Wartime Romance (Военно-полевой роман)
- Directed by: Pyotr Todorovsky
- Written by: Pyotr Todorovsky
- Starring: Nikolai Burlyayev; Natalya Andrejchenko; Inna Churikova
- Cinematography: Valery Blinov
- Music by: Pyotr Todorovsky; Igor Kantyukov
- Production company: Odessa Film Studio
- Release date: 1984
- Running time: 87 minutes
- Country: Soviet Union
- Language: Russian

Wartime Romance (Russian: «Военно-полевой роман», romanized: Voenno-polevoy roman, Ukrainian: «Віськово-польовий роман») is a 1984 Soviet film written and directed by Pyotr Todorovsky. It had its premiere at the 34th Berlin Film Festival in February 1984. It tells the story of a soldier and a nurse separated by World War II and briefly reunited in 1950. The film received a nomination for the Academy Award for Best Foreign Language Film at the 57th Academy Awards, being the last Soviet film to be nominated for this award.

== Plot ==
During World War II, the young soldier Netuschilin, known as Sascha, becomes infatuated with the nurse Ljuba. She is the mistress of the battalion commander and remains unaware of his feelings. Yet, Sascha's thoughts are consumed by her, especially her laughter, which captivates him. As the soldiers prepare for an imminent attack, he bids her farewell, gifting her a flower. This fleeting moment marks their only exchange during the war.

Years later, Sascha has transitioned into a film projector operator. He has happily married Vera, a teacher. One wintry day, Sascha believes he recognizes Ljuba in a destitute pierogi vendor on Moscow Street. Adapted to her harsh surroundings, she has become brash and coarse, striving to raise her daughter alone after the battalion commander's demise. Ljuba grapples with financial uncertainty, unsure if she can afford the rent for the small room provided by a former lover.

Quietly but persistently, Sascha wins Ljuba's heart. He regularly purchases pierogies from her, bestows flowers, and helps restore her self-respect. Sacrificing his duties as a film projector operator, he takes her to concerts. Complaints mount, prompting the theater manager to confront Vera about Sascha's affair. Although presented with evidence, Vera cannot summon jealousy. On New Year's Eve, when Sascha fails to return home, Vera visits Ljuba's apartment. Shortly after, Sascha and Ljuba arrive, initially met with Ljuba's defensive stance. However, they soon reconcile, spending the evening together. Through this, Ljuba witnesses the compassionate bond between Sascha and Vera. Though apprehensive, Vera accepts the triangular relationship, understanding Sascha's commitment to Ljuba stems from compassion rather than romantic love, viewing her plight as unjust.

Under Sascha's guidance, Ljuba endeavors to secure a new apartment through the housing committee. Together, they appeal to the deputy, hinting at Ljuba's willingness to comply with certain requests for the sake of housing. Despite Sascha's embarrassment, the deputy shows interest. When Ljuba disappears one day, Sascha searches in vain. Having abandoned her job as a pierogi vendor and her former residence, Ljuba unexpectedly visits Vera. They bond over drinks and confidences, with Ljuba revealing her intention to marry the deputy of the housing committee. Both women are moved to tears. Eventually, Sascha learns of Ljuba's whereabouts from her ex-boyfriend, observing her new life with husband and daughter. Rejecting her advances, Sascha wanders despondently through the snowy streets. His disturbance leads to his arrest by a mounted policeman. Meanwhile, Vera, sensing trouble, intervenes, pleading with the policeman. Amidst the laughter of onlookers, the policeman relents, allowing Sascha and Vera to remain together.

== Cast ==
- Nikolai Burlyayev as Netuzhilin
- Natalya Andrejchenko as Lyuba
- Inna Churikova as Vera
- Yekaterina Yudina as Kat'ka
- Zinovy Gerdt as Administrator
- Yelena Kozelkova as Administrator's wife
- Viktor Proskurin as Novikov
- Vsevolod Shilovsky as Grisha
- Aleksandr Martynov as Kombat
- Natalya Chenchik as Lotochnitsa
- Vladimir Yuryev as Malyanov
- Yuriy Dubrovin as Terekhin

== Awards and nominations ==
- The film was nominated for the Academy Award for Best Foreign Language Film at the 57th Academy Awards.
- Inna Churikova won the Silver Bear for Best Actress at the 34th Berlin International Film Festival.

== See also ==
- List of submissions to the 57th Academy Awards for Best Foreign Language Film
- List of Soviet submissions for the Academy Award for Best Foreign Language Film
