= Sergey Batalov =

Russian actor

- Born: Sergey Felixovich Batalov; 19 April 1957 (age 69); Irbit
- Occupation: Actor
- Years active: 1979-present
- Awards: Nika Award (2006)

Sergey Felixovich Batalov (Russian: Серге́й Фе́ликсович Бата́лов) is a Russian actor. Merited Artist of the Russian Federation. He appeared in over 140 films.

== Biography ==
Sergey was born on April 19, 1957. He studied at the acting department at Russian Institute of Theatre Arts, after which he worked at the Theater on Malaya Bronnaya, as well as at the Human Theater and the Moscow Art Theater.

== Selected filmography ==
Year	Title	Role	Notes
1990	Cloud-Paradise	Fedya	
1994	Life and Extraordinary Adventures of Private Ivan Chonkin	Nikolay	
1995	Shirli-myrli	police lieutenant	
1997	Cops and Robbers	Norman	
2007	Vanechka	Nikulenko	
2008	Gentlemen Officers: Save the Emperor	Frolan Neyasny	
2009	The Brothers Karamazov	Pyotr Perkhotin	TV series
2010	The House of the Sun	Rodion	
2014	House with Lilies	Gavrila Petrovich	TV series
2014	Yolki 1914	Vladimir	
2017	The Age of Pioneers	Arkhip Leonov	
2023	1993	Maltsev	
