= Cops and Robbers (1997 film) =

- Russian: Полицейские и воры
- Directed by: Nikolay Dostal
- Starring: Sergey Batalov; Yevgeniya Glushenko; Gennady Khazanov; Gennadiy Nazarov; Vyacheslav Nevinny
- Release date: 1997
- Country: Russia
- Language: Russian

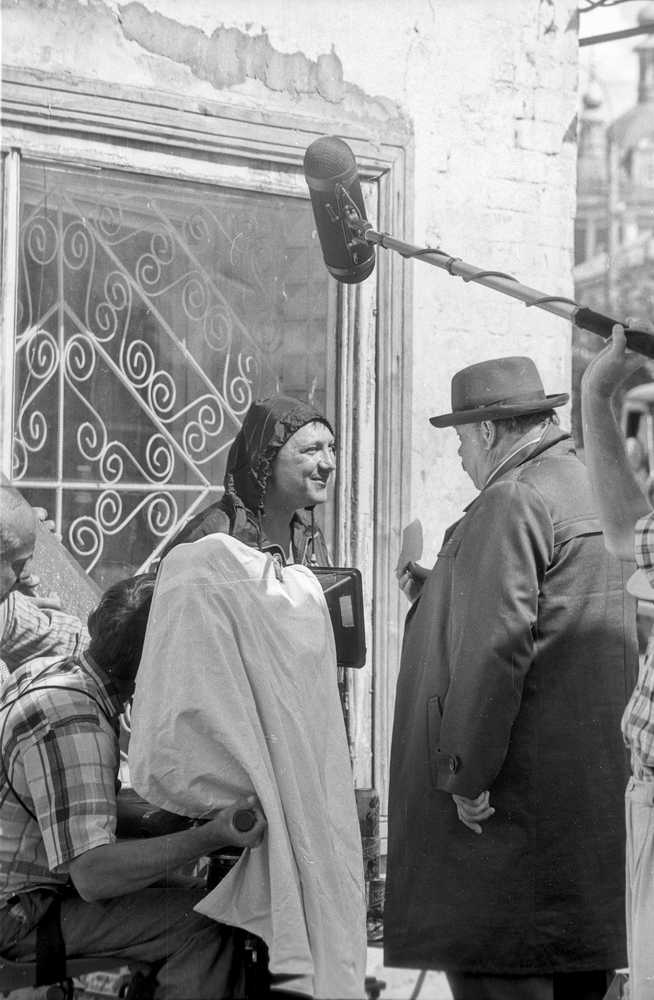

Cops and Robbers (Russian: Полицейские и воры) is a 1997 Russian crime comedy-drama film directed by Nikolay Dostal.

== Plot ==
A crook sells false archaeological treasures to a foreigner, not even suspecting that he is the director of a Russian-American pasta factory, who, realizing that he was deceived, ordered his guard to find a crook.

== Cast ==
- Sergey Batalov
- Yevgeniya Glushenko
- Gennady Khazanov
- Gennadiy Nazarov
- Vyacheslav Nevinny
- Tagir Rakhimov
- Elena Tsyplakova
- Vladimir Zeldin
