= Faithfulness (film) =

- Russian: Верность
- Directed by: Pyotr Todorovsky
- Written by: Bulat Okudzhava; Pyotr Todorovsky
- Starring: Vitaliy Chetverikov; Galina Polskikh; Aleksandr Potapov; Yevgeny Yevstigneyev; Antonina Dmitrieva
- Cinematography: Vadim Avloshenko; Leonid Burlaka; Vadim Kostromenko
- Edited by: Etna Mayskaya
- Music by: Boris Karamyshev
- Production company: Odesa Film Studio
- Release date: 1965
- Running time: 87 min.
- Country: Soviet Union
- Language: Russian

Faithfulness (Russian: Верность, romanized: Vernost) is a 1965 Soviet war romance film directed by Pyotr Todorovsky.

== Plot ==
The film tells about a schoolboy named after Yura, who, as a result of the death of his father, decides to become a cadet at a military school. Once he with a friend are visiting a girl and Yura fell in love with her. After some time, the cadets go to the front...

== Cast ==
- Vladimir Chetverikov as Yura Nikitin
- Galina Polskikh as Zoya
- Aleksandr Potapov as Murga
- Yevgeny Yevstigneyev as Ivan Terentievich
- Antonina Dmitrieva as Zoya's mother
- Valentina Telegina as Woman
- Vladimir Krasnov as Strokov
- Georgy Drozd as Platoon commander
- Yu. Zobov as Sergeant major
- Boris Tokarev as Lieutenant
- Vera Kulakova as Lieutenant
- Lyusyena Ovchinnikova as widow

== Soundtrack ==
- Georgy Vinogradov: In the Сlearing (Russian: На полянке, romanized: Na polyanke)

== Accolades ==
The film by Pyotr Todorovsky was awarded "Best First Work" at the 26th Venice International Film Festival, where he participated in the competition program. He also received the Special Prize of the II All-Union Film Festival (1966, Kyiv).
