= Resurrection (1960 film) =

- Directed by: Mikhail Schweitzer
- Written by: Yevgeny Gabrilovich; Mikhail Schweitzer
- Based on: Resurrection by Leo Tolstoy
- Starring: Tamara Syomina; Yevgeny Matveyev; Pavel Massalsky
- Cinematography: Sergei Poluyanov; Era Savelyeva
- Edited by: Klavdiya Aleyeva
- Music by: Georgy Sviridov
- Production company: Mosfilm Studios
- Distributed by: Mosfilm
- Release dates: 20 November 1960 (part 1); 23 March 1962 (part 2); 6 October 1963 (U.S.)
- Running time: 209 minutes
- Country: Soviet Union
- Language: Russian

Resurrection (Russian: Воскресение, romanized: Voskreseniye) is a Soviet film made in 1960–1961, directed by Mikhail Schweitzer and based on his and Yevgeny Gabrilovich's adaptation of the Russian writer Leo Tolstoy's 1899 novel of the same name.

== Plot ==
In the District Court, a jury hears about the fatal poisoning of a merchant Smyelkov. Among the three accused of the crime is the burgher Ekaterina Maslova, a prostitute. Maslova is innocent, but, as a result of a miscarriage of justice, she is sentenced to four years' hard labor in Siberia.

At the trial, one of the jurors is Prince Dmitri Nekhlyudov, who recognizes the defendant. About ten years ago, he seduced and abandoned her. Feeling guilty about this, Nekhlyudov decides to hire a well-known lawyer for her, to appeal her conviction, and to help her with money.

Struck by the injustice in the court, Nekhlyudov begins to feel disgust for, and an aversion to, all the people with whom he interacts with in his daily life, in particular to the representatives of high society. He decides to abandon his current society and to go abroad. Nekhlyudov recalls Maslova – what he saw her at the trial, and then other moments he shared with her.

== Cast ==
- Tamara Syomina as Katyusha Maslova
- Yevgeny Matveyev as Prince Nekhludov
- Pavel Massalsky as Presiding Judge
- Viktor Kulakov as Member of the Court
- Vasili Bokarev as Member of the Court
- Lev Zolotukhin as Prosecutor
- Vladimir Sez as Court Secretary
- Vyacheslav Sushkevich as Prison Warden
- Nikolai Svobodin as Retired Colonel
- Aleksandr Khvylya as Merchant
- Alexander Smirnov as Nikiforov
- Sergei Kalinin as Member of Workers Collective
- Nina Samsonova as Bochkova
- Vladimir Boriskin as Kartinkin
- Valentina Vladimirova as prisoner
- Nikolai Sergeyev as prison warden
- Anastasa Zuyeva as Matryona Kharina
- Vladimir Gusev as Simonson
- Klara Rumyanova as Bogodukhovskaya
- Maya Bulgakova as Anisya
- Vladislav Strzhelchik as Earl Shembok
- Vasily Livanov as Kryltsov
- Vladimir Belokurov as Maslennikov
- Nikolai Pazhitnov as Maslova's Lawyer
- Valentina Telegina as Korablyova
- Olesya Ivanova as Red-Headed Woman
- Maria Vinogradova as Khoroshavka
- Mikhail Sidorkin as Lawyer Fonarin
- Grigori Konsky as Korchagin
- Elena Yelina as Sofya Ivanovna
- Sofya Garrel Garell as Marya Ivanovna
- Rolan Bykov as madman
- Aleksandra Panova as Agrafena Petrovna
- Aleksey Konsovsky as Narrator's voice

== Reception ==
Tamara Syomina's acting was praised by Federico Fellini and Giulietta Masina.

== Awards ==
- 1962 – International Film Festival in Locarno premium FIPRESCI best actress (Tamara Syomina)
