= Infinitas =

1992 film

- DVD Cover
- Directed by: Marlen Khutsiev
- Written by: Marlen Khutsiyev
- Produced by: Valentina Chutova
- Starring: Vladislav Pilnikov
- Cinematography: Gennady Karyuk; Vadim Mikhailov; Andrey Epishin
- Music by: Nikolai Karetnikov
- Release date: 1992
- Running time: 206 minutes
- Country: Soviet Union
- Language: Russian

Infinitas (Russian: Бесконечность, romanized: Beskonechnost) is a 1992 Soviet drama film directed by Marlen Khutsiev. It was entered into the 42nd Berlin International Film Festival where it won the Alfred Bauer Prize and Prize of the Ecumenical Jury.

== Plot ==
Reflecting on the meaning of life, the hero of the film involuntarily becomes a real participant of his own memories.

His traveling companion — he himself, 20 years ago, a young boy, not burdened by life experience, which is still to come, along with sins and virtues. The hero is living over his life, trying to find his way back to basics, to learn of his roots.

== Cast ==
- Vladislav Pilnikov
- Aleksei Zelenov
- Marina Khazova
- Anna Tchernakova (as Anna Kudryavtseva)
- Nina Pritolovskaya
- Yuri Khlopetsky
- Natalya Goncharova
