= The Last Victim (1975 film) =

- Russian: Последняя жертва
- Directed by: Pyotr Todorovsky
- Written by: Alexander Ostrovsky; Pyotr Todorovsky; Vladimir Zuev
- Starring: Margarita Volodina; Oleg Strizhenov; Mikhail Gluzsky; Leonid Kuravlyov; Olga Naumenko
- Cinematography: Leonid Kalashnikov
- Edited by: Roza Rogatkina
- Music by: Isaac Schwartz
- Production company: Mosfilm
- Release date: 1975
- Running time: 103 min.
- Country: Soviet Union
- Language: Russian

The Last Victim (Russian: Последняя жертва, romanized: Poslednyaya zhertva) is a 1975 Soviet romantic drama film directed by Pyotr Todorovsky. Based on the play of the same name by Alexander Ostrovsky.

== Plot ==
A woman who loves is ready to sacrifice for the salvation of her beloved with all her fortune. How will Vadim Dulchin, a handsome man and a player, answer this? And how far can a woman who loves him go.

== Cast ==
- Margarita Volodina as Yuliya Pavlovna Tugina
- Oleg Strizhenov as Vadim Dulchin
- Mikhail Gluzsky as Flor Fedulych
- Leonid Kuravlyov as Lavr Mironych Pribytkov
- Olga Naumenko as Irina Lavrovna Pribytkova
- Vladimir Kenigson as Salay Saltanych Banvar
- Valeri Filatov as Luka Gerasimovich Dergachyov
- Maria Vinogradova as Mikheyevna
- Pavel Vinnik as Kislovsky
- Lionella Pyryeva as Kruglaya
- Viktor Proskurin as hussar
- Valentina Ananina as merchant's wife
