= Sergey Kudryavtsev =

Russian film critic and historian (born 1956)

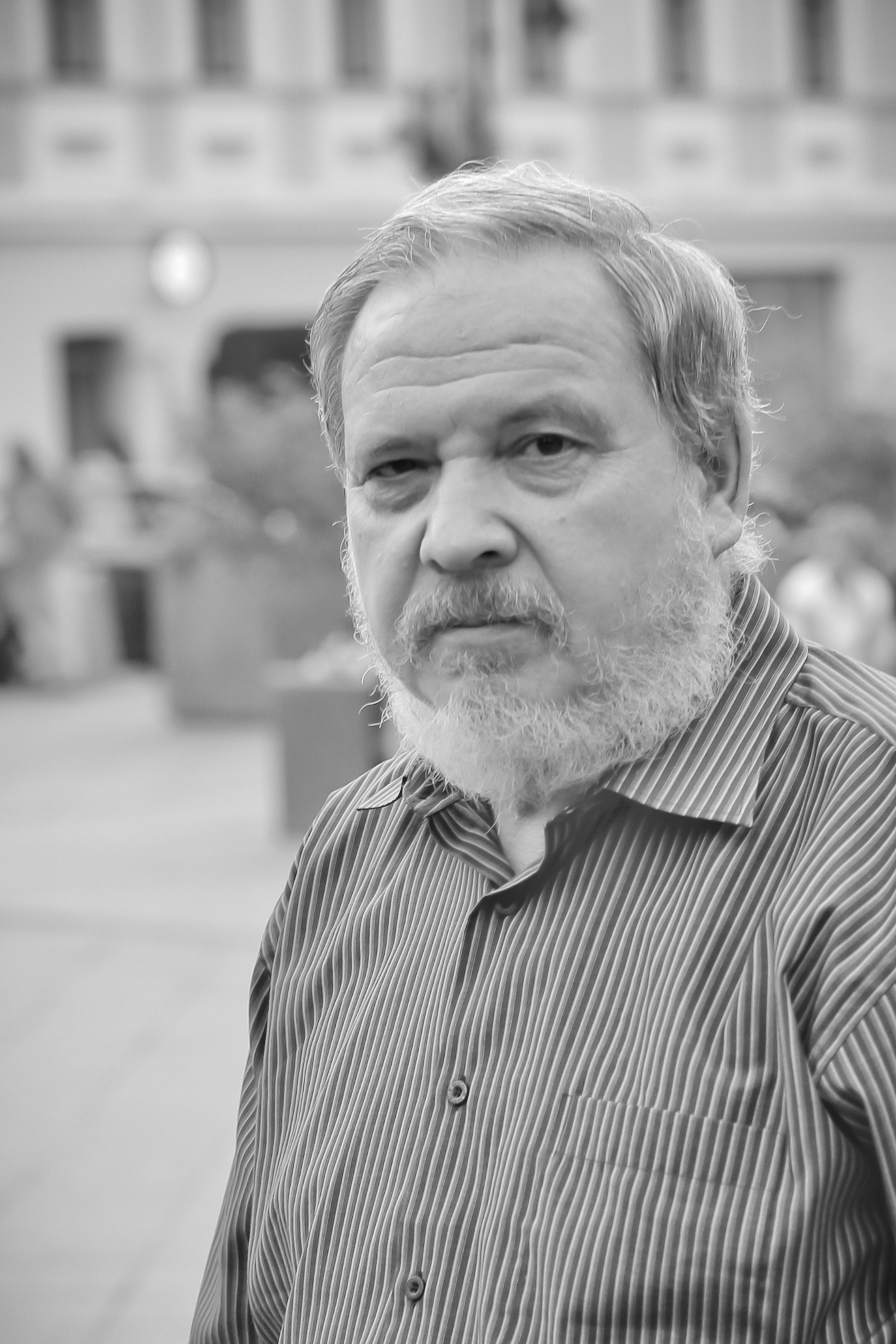
- Born: Sergey Valentinovich Kudryavtsev; March 12, 1956 (age 70); Chita, USSR
- Citizenship: Moscow
- Occupation: Film critic
- Writing career
- Subject: Film

Sergey Valentinovich Kudryavtsev (Russian: Серге́й Валенти́нович Кудря́вцев) is a Russian film critic and historian.

He graduated from the Gerasimov Institute of Cinematography in 1978 and worked in the office of Soviet cinema at VGIK in 1980–1983.

Kudryavtsev began his career as a film critic in 1973, when he was 17. He has published several books on Russian and world cinema, such as 500 films (1991), +500 (1994), The Last 500 (1996), Our Cinema (1998), the personal film encyclopedia 3500 (2008).

He taught history and theory of cinema at VGIK in 1994–1998, was a lecturer at the High Courses for Scriptwriters and Film Directors (since 2005), the Institute of Contemporary Art (since 2008). A three times winner of the Russian Guild of Film Critics awards.

Now his new three-volume personal film encyclopedia Almost 44000 is being in preparation. The first volume, dedicated to the 120th anniversary of world cinema, has been released in December 2015. At the moment Kudryavtsev collects funds for the publication of the second volume using crowdfunding on Planeta.ru website.
