= Marlen Khutsiev =

Georgian-born Soviet and Russian filmmaker (1925–2019)

- Марлен Хуциев
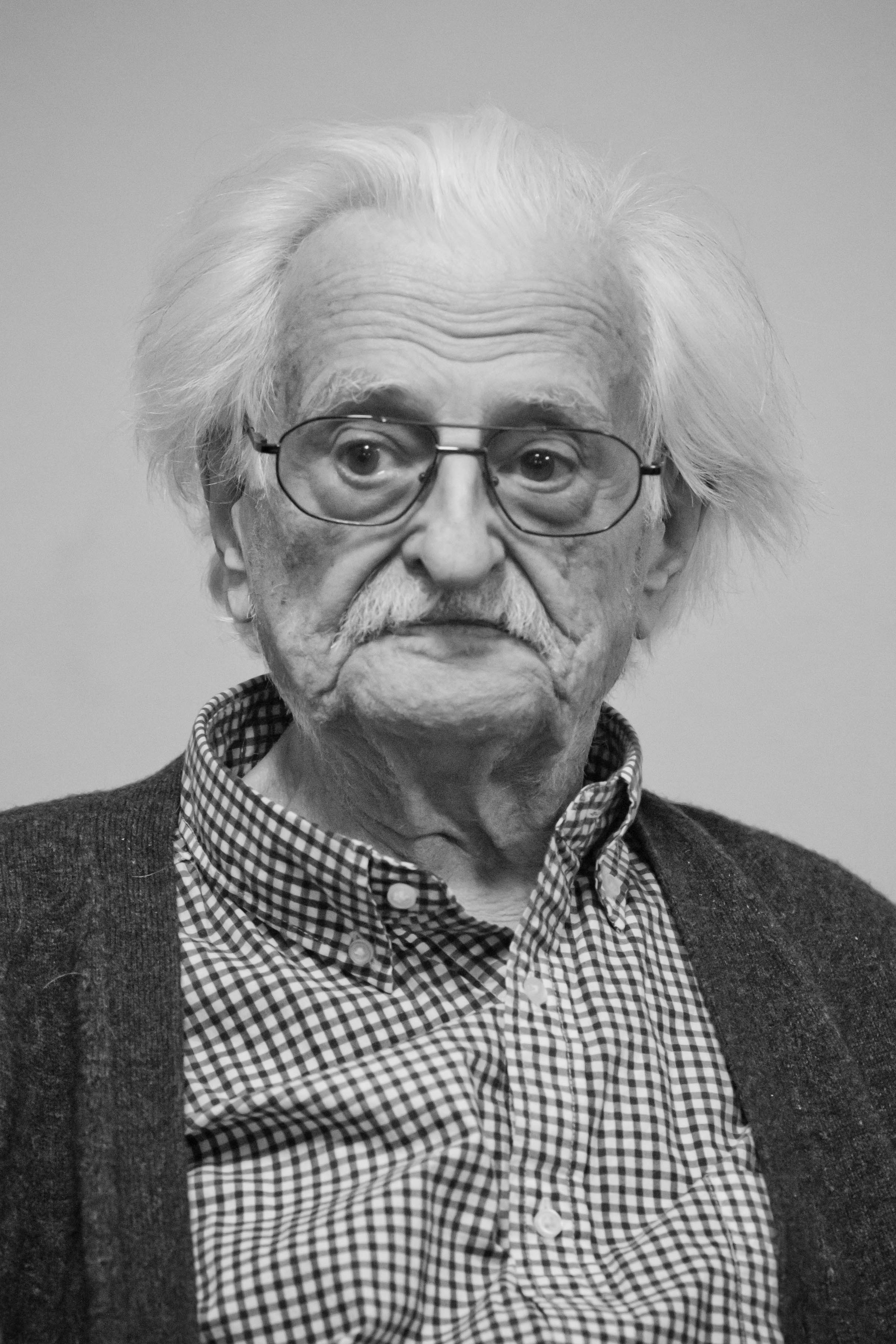
- Khutsiev in 2018
- Born: 4 October 1925; Tiflis, Georgian SSR, Transcaucasian SFSR, Soviet Union
- Died: 19 March 2019 (aged 93); Moscow, Russia
- Occupations: Film director; Screenwriter
- Years active: 1952–2019
- Spouse: Irina Solovyova

Marlen Martynovich Khutsiev (Note: Russian: Марлен Мартынович Хуциев, romanized: Marlen Martynovich Khutsiyev; Georgian: მარლენ ხუციევი, romanized: Marlen Khutsievi) (4 October 1925 – 19 March 2019) was a Georgian-born Soviet and Russian filmmaker best known for his cult films from the 1960s, which include I Am Twenty and July Rain. He was named a People's Artist of the USSR in 1986.

== Biography ==
Khutsiev's father, Martyn Levanovich Khutsishvili (Georgian: მარტინ ლევანის ძე ხუციშვილი) (the family's original Georgian surname, Khutsishvili), was a lifelong Communist who was purged in 1937. His mother, Nina Mikhailovna Utenelishvili (Georgian: ნინა მიხეილის ასული უტენელიშვილი) was an actress. Khutsiev studied film in the directing department at the Gerasimov Institute of Cinematography (VGIK), graduating in 1952. He worked as a director at the Odessa film studio from 1952 to 1958, and worked full-time as a director at Mosfilm from 1965 onward.

Khutsiev's first feature film, Spring on Zarechnaya Street (1956), encapsulated the mood of the Khrushchev Thaw and went on to become one of the top box-office draws of the 1950s. Three years later, Khutsiev launched Vasily Shukshin "as a new kind of popular hero" by starring him in Two Fyodors. His two masterpieces of the 1960s, however, were panned by the authorities, forcing Khutsiev into something of an artistic silence. In 1978, Khutsiev began teaching film directing master classes at the VGIK.)

His 1991 film Infinitas won the Alfred Bauer Prize at the 42nd Berlin International Film Festival.

== Selected filmography ==
| Year | Title | Notes |
|---|---|---|
| 1956 | Spring on Zarechnaya Street | |
| 1958 | The Two Fedors | |
| 1965 | I Am Twenty | |
| 1967 | July Rain | |
| 1970 | It Was in May | |
| 1984 | Epilogue | |
| 1992 | Infinitas | |

== Honours and awards ==
- Order of Merit for the Fatherland;
  - 2nd class (29 May 2006) for outstanding contributions to the development of national cinema and many years of creative activity
  - 3rd class (25 December 2000) for outstanding contribution to the development of cinema art
  - 4th class (9 April 1996) for services to the state, many years of fruitful work in the arts and culture
- Order of Honour (5 October 2010) for outstanding contribution to the development of the domestic art of film and many years of creative activity
- Order of the Badge of Honour (1975)
- Jubilee Medal "In Commemoration of the 100th Anniversary since the Birth of Vladimir Il'ich Lenin" (1970)
- People's Artist of the USSR (1986)
- People's Artist of the RSFSR (1977)
- State Prize of the Russian Federation (7 December 1993)
- Special Prize of the Russian Federation President (12 June 1999) for outstanding contribution to the development of Russian cinema
- "Golden Aries" award and winner of The Man Film of the Year (1995)
- Prize of the city of St. Petersburg he is a living legend of the national cinema — V Festival Viva Cinema of Russia (1997)
- Moscow Mayor's Award (1999) a unique contribution to the development of culture in Moscow
- National Award in the field of documentary film and television laurel branch for 2002 in the category for contribution to Cinema Chronicle
- Triumph Award (2004)
- Nika Award in the honour and dignity (2006)
- Order of Friendship (2016)
