= Agapetus =

Agapetus (Ancient Greek: Ἀγαπητός, beloved), also spelled Agapetos or Agapitus, may refer to:

- Agapetus (caddisfly), a genus of caddisflies
  - List of Agapetus species
- Agapitus of Palestrina (died 274), Christian martyr
- Agapetus (physician), ancient Greek doctor
- Agapitus (consul 517)
- Pope Agapetus I (died 536)
- Agapetus (deacon) (fl. 500–527), a deacon of the church of Hagia Sophia in Constantinople
- Pope Agapetus II (died 955)
- Agapetus of the Kiev Caves (died 1095), saint of the Eastern Orthodox Church
- John IX Agapetus (died 1134), Patriarch of Constantinople
- Agapetus, pen name of Yrjö Soini (1896–1975), Finnish journalist, novelist and playwright

== See also ==
- Saint Agapitus (disambiguation)
