= Mikhail Yershov =

Mikhail Yershov is the name of:

- Mikhail Aleksandrovich Yershov (born 1986), Russian footballer
- Mikhail Yershov (actor), Russian movie actor who acted in Moscow-Cassiopeia and Teens in the Universe
- Mikhail Yershov (Orthodox bishop), said to have spent 43 years in the GULAG in the Soviet Union
