= Yershov (inhabited locality) =

Yershov (Russian: Ершов, masculine) or Yershova (Ершова, feminine) is the name of several inhabited localities in Russia.

== Modern localities ==
Urban localities

- Yershov, Saratov Oblast, a town in Yershovsky District of Saratov Oblast

Rural localities

- Yershov, Karachay-Cherkess Republic, a khutor in Urupsky District of the Karachay-Cherkess Republic; 44°2′N 40°58′E
- Yershov, Volgograd Oblast, a khutor in Goncharovsky Selsoviet of Pallasovsky District in Volgograd Oblast
- Yershova, Irkutsk Oblast, a village in Bokhansky District of Irkutsk Oblast
- Yershova, Republic of Karelia, a village in Pudozhsky District of the Republic of Karelia
- Yershova, Perm Krai, a village in Kudymkarsky District of Perm Krai

== Alternative names ==
- Yershov, alternative name of Yershi, a village in Marisolinsky Rural Okrug of Sernursky District in the Mari El Republic; 57°3′N 49°1′E
- Yershova, alternative name of Yershovo, a village in Ardinsky Rural Okrug of Kilemarsky District in the Mari El Republic; 56°24′N 46°51′E
