= Paraplatyptilia lineata =

Scientific classification
- Kingdom: Animalia
- Phylum: Arthropoda
- Clade: Pancrustacea
- Class: Insecta
- Order: Lepidoptera
- Family: Pterophoridae
- Genus: Paraplatyptilia
- Species: P. lineata

Binomial name
- Paraplatyptilia lineata (Arenberger, 1984)

Synonyms
- Mariana lineata Arenberger, 1984

Species of plume moth

Paraplatyptilia lineata is a moth of the family Pterophoridae that is found in Russia (Ural mountains).

The wingspan is 21–23 millimetres (0.83–0.91 in). The forewings and hindwings are greyish brown.

== Taxonomy ==
It is sometimes treated as a synonym of Paraplatyptilia sahlbergi.
