= Paraplatyptilia watkinsi =

Scientific classification
- Kingdom: Animalia
- Phylum: Arthropoda
- Class: Insecta
- Order: Lepidoptera
- Family: Pterophoridae
- Genus: Paraplatyptilia
- Species: P. watkinsi

Binomial name
- Paraplatyptilia watkinsi Gielis, 2008

Species of plume moth

Paraplatyptilia watkinsi is a moth of the family Pterophoridae. It is found in North America, including the type location Burnett County, Wisconsin. It has also been recorded from Vermont.

The species was first described in 2008 by Dr. Cees Gielis, who named it after Reed A. Watkins for his work on nearctic region Pterophoridae.

Paraplatyptilia watkinsi and Paraplatyptilia sabourini are cryptic species differentiated by diagnostic character in female genitalia.
