= Yershov (disambiguation) =

Yershov or Ershov may refer to:

- Yershov (inhabited locality), several inhabited localities in Russia
- Yershov (surname)
- Ershov number, type of number used in code optimization
