= Aleksei Loktev =

Soviet actor (1939–2006)

- Born: Aleksei Vasilievich Loktev; 30 December 1939; Orsk, Orenburg Oblast, USSR
- Died: 17 September 2006 (aged 66); Tambovka, Amur Oblast, Russia
- Occupation: actor
- Years active: 1960–1991
- Spouse: Svetlana Loshchinina (1944-1988, died)
- Awards: Honored Artist of the RSFSR; State Prize of the USSR (1972)

Aleksei Vasilievich Loktev (Russian: Алексей Васильевич Локтев; 30 December 1939 – 17 September 2006) was a Russian and Soviet actor. He was anHonored Artist of the RSFSR (12 April 1972).

He graduated from the Lunacharsky State Institute for Theatre Arts in 1962. After graduating he became an actor of the Moscow Pushkin Drama Theatre. From 1972 worked as an actor of the Maly Theater. From 1980 to 1989, he was an actor of the Russian State Pushkin Academy Drama Theater in Leningrad. From 1989 to 2006, he was an actor of theater Glas. He created the Aleksei Loktev's Theatre, where he worked as an actor and director.

== Biography ==
=== Actor ===
Loktev was born in Orsk. A few years later, in 1943, his father was transferred to work in Moscow. There, Loktev went to school and started going to drama classes at the ZiL. After finishing his secondary education, he worked at that plant for some time as a turner, but the craving for art was stronger.

At the age of 17, he first starred in a movie, a cameo in the Leonid Lukov's Different Fortunes. A short time later Loktev, having successfully passed the exams, was admitted to the Lunacharsky State Institute for Theatre Arts.

While studying at the institute he played his first lead role in a movie Farewell, Doves.

After graduating in 1962, Aleksei became an actor of the Moscow Pushkin Drama Theater. At the same time, he continued his movie career. In 1963 came out Walking the Streets of Moscow by Georgi Danelia, a movie, which became a symbol of the time. Aleksei played in that picture a Siberian boy named Volodya Ermakov, who, while on a business trip in Moscow, brought the manuscript of his novel. Together with Aleksei in the film also stars young Nikita Mikhalkov and Yevgeny Steblov. All of them woke up famous after the release of the movie.

After that Loktev starred in the military movie First Snow, family drama Our House, military-adventure film Tunnel (USSR — Bulgaria). All movies had different genre and level of quality, however, none of them brought actor the success like the Walking the Streets of Moscow did. That role remained the most significant in his career.

His last major role was in the movie In Russia (1968). Ironically his co-star was Svetlana Savelova, who shot him in the film Farewell, Pigeons!. Actors were invited to save the movie from failing, but it did not help. Tape still failed at the box office and became final for them. Aftet that Loktev rarely appeared on screens, mostly playing small roles.

His theater career was more successful. In those years, tickets for performances in the theater named after Pushkin was given to the load, but posing with Aleksei Loktev halls were full. Directed by Boris Ravenskikh staged performances under Loktev.

In 1972, the elbows behind Ravenskikh left Moscow theater named after Pushkin and moved to the Little Theatre. Here he worked until 1980. With the death of Boris, Loktev and could no longer find its director. Moved to St. Petersburg and became an actor drama named after Pushkin in Leningrad. Aleksei was left alone in a strange city, bringing started drinking. However, he managed to pull himself together, found the strength come to God. Visit the temple every day: helping with the service and baptism. Again in Moscow Loktev returned in 1989, joined the troupe of the Glas Moscow Theater.

In the movie, Loktev, in the second half of the 1980s, had virtually no shot. He was still in demand, familiar directors offered him the role, allowed to read the script. But in those years, the country began to change values, and he did not find anything interesting for himself.

=== Director ===
In the 1990s Aleksei Loktev first turned to directing. In 1993, he staged I'll Be Back! — a popular singer Igor Talkov. This was followed by performances of I Believe! by Vasily Shukshin and Fyodor and Anna about the life of Dostoyevsky.

Aleksei Vasilievich organized his own Theatre Aleksei Loktev's (TAL), which was both the head and the director, and actor. Great success with viewers had his musical and poetic performance Visions on the Hill (the poet Nikolai Rubtsov), staged at the Alexandrinsky Theatre.

One of his last works the play, The Last Love Dostoevsky, which is based on Fyodor diaries, as well as excerpts from the writer of several novels. Performance (in which Aleksei Vasil'evich starred) a few years with success went on the small stage of the Mayakovsky Theatre.

=== Personal life ===
Loktev had four children. His first marriage ended up with divorce during his student years. His second wife died of cancer, leaving Loktev with two young children. His daughter Alexandra is married to a rock musician Konstantin Kinchev from the Alisa band . The band dedicated the song What Then, from the album Pulse Guardian Door Labyrinth to Loktev.

== Death ==
He died in a car accident on 17 September 2006 in Blagoveshchensk. He was buried at the municipal Volkovo Cemetery in Mytischi, Moscow Oblast.

== Awards ==
- Honored Artist of the RSFSR (1972)
- Laureate of the State Prize of the USSR (1972) for his role as Pavel Korchagin in the play The Dramatic Song)
