= Loktev =

Loktev (Russian: Локтев, from локоть meaning elbow) is a Russian masculine surname, its feminine counterpart (in Slavic countries) is Lokteva. It may refer to:

- Aleksei Loktev (1939–2006), Russian actor
- Denis Loktev (born 2000), Israeli swimmer
- Julia Loktev (born 1969), Russian-American film director and video artist
- Konstantin Loktev (1933–1996), Russian ice hockey player
