= Paraplatyptilia terminalis =

Scientific classification
- Kingdom: Animalia
- Phylum: Arthropoda
- Class: Insecta
- Order: Lepidoptera
- Family: Pterophoridae
- Genus: Paraplatyptilia
- Species: P. terminalis

Binomial name
- Paraplatyptilia terminalis (Erschoff, 1877)

Synonyms
- Platyptilia terminalis Erschoff, 1877; Mariana terminalis carelica Zagulajev, 1983

Species of plume moth

Paraplatyptilia terminalis is a moth of the family Pterophoridae that is found in Russia (the West Siberian Lowland, the South Siberian Mountains, Central Yakutian Lowland and Kamchatka) and Bosnia and Herzegovina.
