= Lebedev against Lebedev =

- Russian: Лебедев против Лебедева
- Directed by: Genrikh Gabay
- Written by: Feliks Mironer
- Starring: Aleksey Eybozhenko; Vladimir Retsepter; Lev Durov; Viktor Uralskiy; Sergey Balatev
- Cinematography: Valeri Vladimirov
- Edited by: M. Renkova
- Music by: Edison Denisov
- Production company: Mosfilm
- Release date: 1965
- Running time: 88 min.
- Country: Soviet Union
- Language: Russian

Lebedev against Lebedev (Russian: Лебедев против Лебедева) is a 1965 Soviet drama film directed by Genrikh Gabay.

== Plot ==
The film takes place in Moscow and follows Oleg Lebedev, a nearly 30-year-old physicist working at a scientific research institute. He lives in a 14-square-meter room in a communal apartment, where his married neighbor spitefully writes false reports about him, accusing him of drunkenness and immoral behavior.

The plot unfolds slowly and centers on the protagonist’s inner monologues and debates with his alter ego, which blend seamlessly with real-life events—so much so that it is often difficult for the viewer to distinguish between reality and the character’s imagined scenarios. Oleg, modest, naive, and indecisive in real life, envisions himself in his thoughts as bold, principled, and just.

The film builds on this internal conflict through variations of events: first, the viewer sees how Oleg imagines he should act (defending a stranger from harassers; approaching a girl he likes—whom he has followed for a year without daring to speak to; throwing coffee in the face of a boss who demoted his best friend to hire a relative; confronting his malicious neighbor), and then how he actually behaves (remaining silent, avoiding conflict, complying, and enduring).

The events of the film take place over the course of a single day, during which Oleg either succeeds or fails in various personal and professional confrontations. As the story progresses, the two "Lebedevs"—the real and the idealized—struggle to coexist within one person, eventually becoming antagonists. In the end, the version of the character embodying his better qualities prevails.

The epilogue shows the next morning beginning as usual. However, in line with the film’s optimistic tone, Oleg manages to defend a stranger—though he still misses the chance to meet the girl he admires, leaving it for another time.

== Cast ==
- Aleksey Eybozhenko
- Vladimir Retsepter
- Lev Durov
- Viktor Uralskiy
- Sergey Balatev
- Leonid Bronevoy
- G. Burmistrov
- Mikhail Derzhavin
