= Why Wouldn't We Send a Messenger? =

- Russian: Не послать ли нам… гонца?
- Directed by: Valeri Chikov
- Written by: Valeri Chikov; Ivan Kiasashvili
- Produced by: Mikhail Evdokimov; Natalya Linova
- Starring: Mikhail Evdokimov; Lev Durov; Sasha Komkov; Irina Rozanova; Nikolay Trofimov
- Cinematography: Timur Zelma
- Edited by: Galina Dyakonova
- Music by: Konstantin Shevelyov
- Release date: 1998
- Country: Russia
- Language: Russian

Why Wouldn't We Send a Messenger? (Russian: Не послать ли нам… гонца?) is a 1998 Russian road comedy-drama film directed by Valeri Chikov. The film tells about a devastated farmer who travels to the capital to the president to find out the truth. On the way, he manages to save the businessman, help the loving soldier and the elderly.

== Plot ==
Farmer Ivan Filimonovich Dergunov, who took out a loan to develop his farm, goes broke; bailiffs are seizing his property. Upset, Ivan, in a fit of despair, turns the boiler out of the sauna stove and drowns it in the river; he threatens to blow up his own house so that the bank doesn't get it, and learns that someone has set fire to one of his seized combines. Ivan blames his alcoholic neighbor Kolya, who gloated over the inventory of his property in the morning, and Ivan refused him a drink (for which Kolya, in revenge, showed the bailiffs where the combine was). Ivan hits his neighbor in the face and gets 15 days of administrative arrest for lynching. After serving his sentence, Ivan decides to get to the president to talk to him about life. He sets off on the road in his Zaporozhets, where he has many adventures that show the life of the wild 90s. First, Ivan gives a lift to an old man who bought a coffin in the city; seeing Ivan's surprise at the purchase, the old man tells him that even dying has become too expensive, so he is preparing in advance for himself and his wife, because in their family "they live long".

Soon Ivan hears knocking in the car. He thinks it is the engine knocking, but the knocking is coming from the trunk. There Ivan finds his friend Yakov, who decided to go secretly with Ivan and wanted to go into the bushes to relieve himself. Yakov is mentally ill, walks around with a homemade imitation of a rifle and medals on his torn jacket and communicates with short standard phrases ("Lyuba!" "To Moscow!" "Hands up!" "Yakov is smart!" "Yakov will put you all in jail!" "Kyshi-myshi, fried nails" etc.).

At this time, strange people dressed as policemen drive up to Ivan. They treat Ivan to beer, but immediately threaten to write a report for drunk driving and for attempting to give a bribe. They are told something over the radio, and they quickly drive away. Then Ivan sees these people catching up and shooting at a Mercedes. Ivan understands that they were bandits, hurries to help and pulls a well-dressed man named Alexey, who turns out to be a businessman - a "new Russian", from a car that fell into the river. Despite the well-known stereotypes, Alexey turns out to be a kind and pleasant person; he invites Ivan and Yakov to his home, where they have dinner and talk about business and children, and as a farewell gift he gives Ivan a mobile phone and invites him to visit him in Moscow, where he will be in two days.

Ivan tries to send Yakov home on an intercity bus, but he takes offense at Ivan and, pretending to get on the bus while Ivan was talking to the driver, leaves through the back door. Ivan scolds Yakov, but he has no choice but to take Yakov with him further. Soon Ivan and Yakov meet two soldiers next to a broken KAMAZ, one of whom, having learned that his fiancée was marrying another, went AWOL, but the truck's engine broke down. The soldier named Zaur turned out to be "a person of Caucasian nationality", as he himself first introduced himself. He met his fiancée at the technical school where he studied before the army. Arriving in the village, the heroes find out that the initiator of the wedding was the bride's mother. The mother, for whom all people from the Caucasus, regardless of nationality and occupation, are bandits, accuses Zaur of the death of soldiers in Chechnya, declares that she will not let her daughter live in the village, ignoring the fact that he himself is a soldier of the Russian army, and perhaps did not live in the Caucasus, since he studied at the local technical school. The bride turns to look at Zaur, the upset Zaur throws himself into a puddle, and Ivan uses the phone given to him by Alexey to call the unit commander and explain the situation so that the soldier is not punished for going AWOL. Then Ivan goes to visit his brother-in-law, who shares his joy - his daughter Nina is returning home from a music competition in Paris, where she won first prize - $15,000, and his Moskvich, as luck would have it, has a dead battery. When Ivan and his brother-in-law arrive at the pier, the joy for Nina is overshadowed by the fact that Nina chose not money as a prize, but a musical instrument - a new harp, so that she would have something to practice on at the conservatory. At the suggestion of a local alcoholic ("I won't drink for two days! I'm giving you my cap too!"), the guests gathered for a feast and an impromptu concert chip in money to send Nina to another stage of the competition - to Japan, since the conservatory has no money for the trip.

After Ivan and Yakov encountered road thugs dressed as policemen, they behaved cautiously when they met real policemen (and the policemen, in turn, mistook them for bandits). Yakov, thinking that they were also bandits, takes out his "rifle" and cocks it. Ivan sees this, jumps on Yakov and they fall into a ditch. The policemen open fire with machine guns in response, miraculously not wounding anyone. Both are beaten and arrested. During interrogation, Ivan tells about the bandits who fired at Alexey's car and talks about Yakov's life, who he was, why he went crazy and walks around with a "rifle" and other people's medals on his clothes (these are the medals of his sons who died in Afghanistan). The interrogating police officer, who also lost his son (in Abkhazia), lets them go.

Then Ivan buys a car muffler for his fellow villager from a woman selling it on the side of the road. Seeing similar mufflers further down the highway at a lower price (they were given out instead of wages at a local factory), Ivan returns to the woman and wants to return the money. She tells him about her son, who died as a result of falling from a crane, and that now she is forced to feed her daughter-in-law and three grandchildren. Taking pity, Ivan keeps the muffler for himself and gives her more money.

A dump truck driving along the highway dumps bricks right on the road. From the conversation in the background, it is clear that the driver's curious fiancée, who delayed filing an application with the registry office (and after what happened, finally changed his mind), was to blame. Ivan brakes sharply, and a black Volga crashes into his Zaporozhets from behind. This is how Ivan meets cosmonaut Georgy Grechko. The cosmonaut helps to repair the car, shows Ivan the cosmonaut training center in Star City, and thanks to the participation of a film crew from ORT, who came to interview the cosmonaut, Ivan manages to get on the TV show "Field of Miracles" (the correspondent turns out to be Leonid Yakubovich's neighbor). Knowing about the tradition of giving gifts, but having nothing, Ivan gives Yakubovich a previously purchased muffler.

On a Moscow street, Ivan meets street children who earn money by washing car windows. There he takes a fancy to the youngest of the group - Sasha. Ivan wanted to scold their leader for bullying the little ones, taking away their hard-earned money, teaching them to smoke and drink, and being insolent and familiar with adults, but he finds out that they are all orphans, living in a basement, and that the leader of the company (whose mother is in prison and father is on the run) is missing one leg - according to him, he lost it by stepping on a mine in a hot spot.

When trying to enter the Kremlin directly through the Spassky Gate, Ivan is arrested and placed in a psychiatric hospital, where in the ward he meets three crazy people - the first - who looks like Boris Yeltsin - imagines himself to be Boris Yeltsin, wears a suit and copies the intonation, promises to carry out a new Perestroika and complains that he was locked up here, and some bandits seized power in the Kremlin; the second considers himself a famous director and says that he was the one who filmed "The Irony of Fate", "Mimino", "White Sun of the Desert", "Strawberry Glade", "Nights of Cabiria", "Jolly Fellows" and so on; the third is simply silent and monotonously rocks back and forth. Realizing where he ended up, Ivan pounds his fists on the door and demands to be let out immediately. Yakov, whom Ivan asked to stay in the trunk of the Zaporozhets, gets out of the trunk at the special traffic police parking lot, calls Alexey on the phone and hits the car washer on the head, who tried to take the phone away. Alexey asks Yakov not to hang up, then frees Ivan and takes them with Yakov to a striptease restaurant, where he introduces them to prostitutes, and they go to the hotel. Confused Ivan, entering the room with Vika and not knowing what to do, suggests eating an apple and watching TV. In turn, the girl is surprised by the constrained behavior of the "client", whom she took for an oil magnate. They drink champagne to their acquaintance. Yakov breaks into the room, Ivan introduces him to Vika. Vika dances with Yakov all night, and later admits that she envies him. In the morning, an employee of the Presidential Administration comes to the room and says that Yeltsin, who is currently abroad, heard about the attempt to go to the Kremlin and is ready to meet with Ivan in 2-3 weeks, when he returns to Moscow, promising travel and accommodation at the state's expense. Ivan leaves, hurrying to his wife Lyuba's birthday. He picks up a homeless child, Sasha, with the intention of adopting him, after which he returns home with him and Yakov to start life "from scratch".

== Cast ==
- Mikhail Evdokimov as Ivan
- Lev Durov as Yakov
- Sasha Komkov as Sasha
- Irina Rozanova
- Nikolay Trofimov as Old man with a coffin
- Lyubov Sokolova
- Igor Yasulovich as Mad man
- Ivan Bortnik as Brother-in-law
- Georgi Grechko as Self
- Leonid Yakubovich as Self
