= Paraplatyptilia hedemanni =

Scientific classification
- Kingdom: Animalia
- Phylum: Arthropoda
- Class: Insecta
- Order: Lepidoptera
- Family: Pterophoridae
- Genus: Paraplatyptilia
- Species: P. hedemanni

Binomial name
- Paraplatyptilia hedemanni (Snellen, 1884)

Synonyms
- Pterophorus hedemanni Snellen, 1884

Species of plume moth

Paraplatyptilia hedemanni is a moth of the family Pterophoridae. It is found in the Russian Far East (Primorye), Mongolia, and central Asia.
