= Anatoly Efros =

Soviet theatre and film director

- Анатолий Эфрос
- Born: Anatoly Vasilievich Efros; July 3, 1925; Kharkiv, USSR
- Died: January 13, 1987 (aged 61); Moscow, USSR
- Resting place: Kuntsevo Cemetery
- Occupations: Theatre and film director
- Spouse: Natalia Krymova
- Children: 1 Dmitry Krymov

Anatoly Vasilievich Efros (Russian: Анатолий Васильевич Эфрос; July 3, 1925 – January 13, 1987) was a Soviet theatre and film director. He was a leading interpreter of Russian classics during the Era of Stagnation and "received numerous awards for creative excellence".

His writings on theatre were published in English under the titles The Joy of Rehearsal: Reflections on Interpretation and Practice (ISBN 9780820463384) and The Craft of Rehearsal: Further Reflections on Interpretation and Practice (ISBN 9780820488608).

== Children's Theatre and the Lenkom ==
Efros was born in Kharkiv. In 1954, he was appointed to run the Central Theatre for Children in Moscow and managed to transform it from a conservative backwater into one of the most fashionable Soviet theatres.

At that early period, he staged many plays by Viktor Rozov, including Searching for Happiness (1957), Unequal Battle (1960), Before Supper (1962). In 1963, Efros moved to the Lenkom Theatre and worked there for three years. It was there that he staged another of Rozov's plays, On the Wedding Day (1964). Viña Delmar's Make Way for Tomorrow was produced by him in the Mossovet Theatre (1966), with Faina Ranevskaya and Rostislav Plyatt in leading roles.

== Malaya Bronnaya Theatre ==
The most fruitful period of Efros's career is associated with his work in the Malaya Bronnaya Theatre (1967–84). While working in that theatre, he attracted the crowds of Moscow intelligentsia to his impeccably acted productions of Chekhov's Three Sisters (1967), Moliere's Don Juan (1974), and Gogol's The Marriage (1974). The Communist authorities did not fail to detect a note of discontent in his interpretations of classics and moved to shut them down. Olga Yakovleva and Lev Durov were the actors he most frequently worked with.

In 1978, he filmed his fifth and final movie, On Thursday and Never Again. This psychologically poignant drama, set in the taut atmosphere of Chekhov's plays, featured an impressive cast of actors, led by Innokenty Smoktunovsky.

== Taganka Theatre ==
In the 1970s, Efros collaborated with the stage director Yuri Lyubimov on several projects. In 1973, for instance, he directed a TV adaptation of Mikhail Bulgakov's play The Cabal of Hypocrites, with Lyubimov in the title role of Molière. Two years later, Lyubimov invited Efros into his own Taganka Theatre to stage The Cherry Orchard. Both directors were drawn to the traditions of Vsevolod Meyerhold and Yevgeny Vakhtangov.

In 1984, after Lyubimov left the Taganka Theatre for the West, Efros accepted an offer to run that theatre. Most of the actors, however, treated him as an enemy and sometimes flatly refused to cooperate with him. It is thought that the conflict with the Taganka actors contributed to Efros's premature death.
