= Paraplatyptilia fragilis =

Scientific classification
- Kingdom: Animalia
- Phylum: Arthropoda
- Class: Insecta
- Order: Lepidoptera
- Family: Pterophoridae
- Genus: Paraplatyptilia
- Species: P. fragilis

Binomial name
- Paraplatyptilia fragilis (Walsingham, 1880)

Synonyms
- Platyptilus fragilis Walsingham, 1880

Species of plume moth

Paraplatyptilia fragilis is a moth of the family Pterophoridae. It was described by Lord Walsingham from the Klamath Lakes area in northern California, and has a wide range in the Great Basin, inland montane and desert ranges from eastern British Columbia to Utah, and from New Mexico to southern California and Baja California Norte in Mexico.

The wingspan is 17–19 mm. Adults are on wing in April. Paraplatyptilia fragilis is very similar to Paraplatyptilia carduidactylus, but averages much paler, particularly on the abdomen which is uniformly pale. In P. carduidactylus the abdomen is usually patterned or banded, and often has more spots on browner wings. Some specimens, particularly worn or pale examples of P. carduidactylus, may require dissection for definite identification.

The larvae feed on Penstemon cyananthus.
