= Paraplatyptilia inanis =

Scientific classification
- Kingdom: Animalia
- Phylum: Arthropoda
- Class: Insecta
- Order: Lepidoptera
- Family: Pterophoridae
- Genus: Paraplatyptilia
- Species: P. inanis

Binomial name
- Paraplatyptilia inanis (Caradja, 1920)

Synonyms
- Platyptilia inanis Caradja, 1920

Species of plume moth

Paraplatyptilia inanis is a moth of the family Pterophoridae that is found in Armenia. The species was described by Aristide Caradja in 1920.

The wingspan is about 18 millimetres (0.71 in).
