= Paraplatyptilia sibirica =

Scientific classification
- Kingdom: Animalia
- Phylum: Arthropoda
- Class: Insecta
- Order: Lepidoptera
- Family: Pterophoridae
- Genus: Paraplatyptilia
- Species: P. sibirica

Binomial name
- Paraplatyptilia sibirica (Zagulajev, 1983)

Synonyms
- Mariana sibirica Zagulajev, 1983; Paraplatyptilia siberica

Species of plume moth

Paraplatyptilia sibirica is a moth of the family Pterophoridae that is endemic to Russia (South Siberian Mountains and the mountains of north-eastern Siberia).
