= The Man from Nowhere (1961 film) =

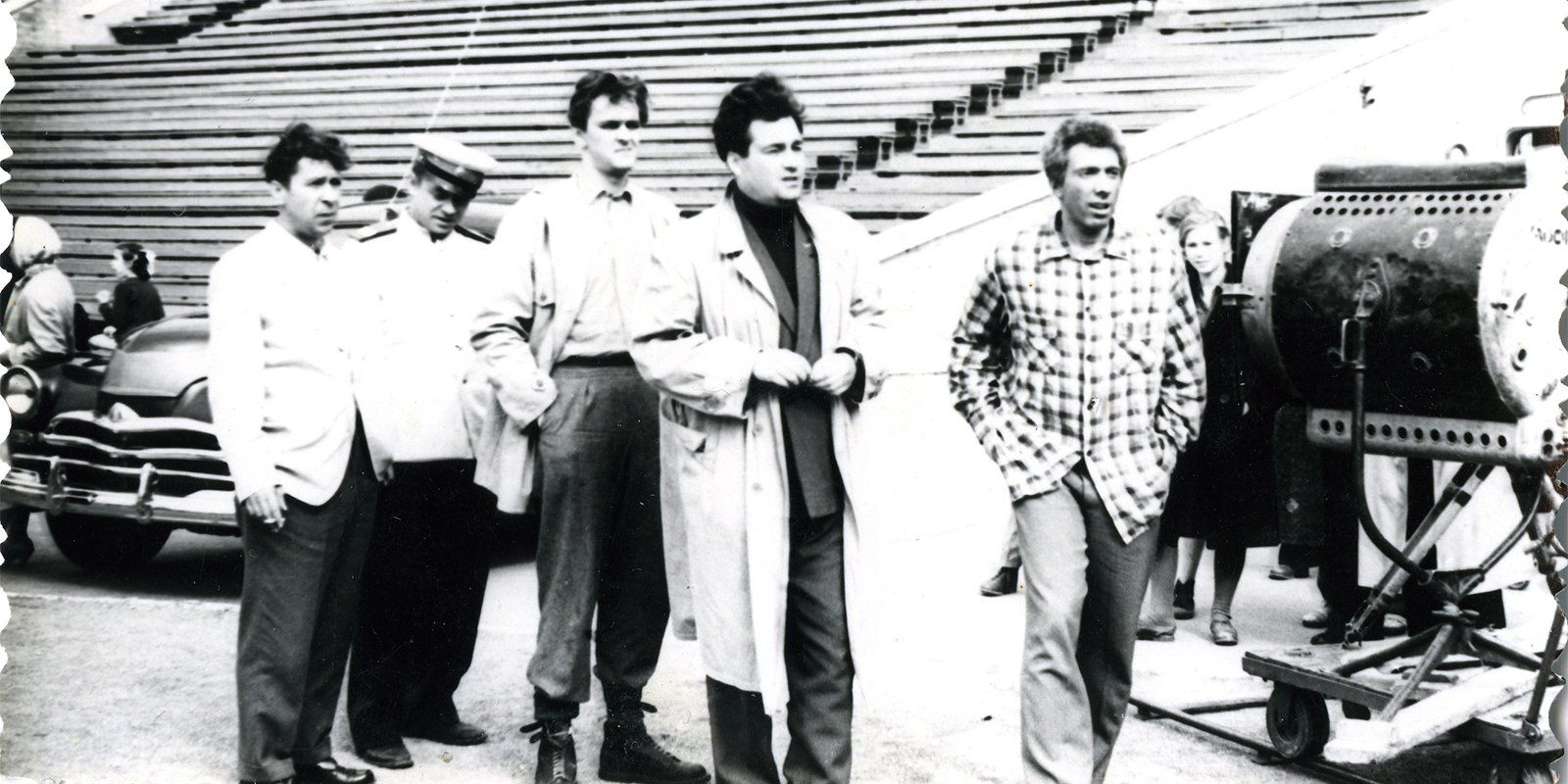
- Film crew: director Eldar Ryazanov and actors Valentin Abramov, Yuri Belov, Yury Yakovlev, and Sergey Yursky
- Russian: Человек ниоткуда
- Directed by: Eldar Ryazanov
- Written by: Leonid Zorin
- Produced by: Max Gershengorin
- Starring: Sergei Yursky; Yury Yakovlev; Anatoliy Papanov; Lyudmila Gurchenko; Anatoly Adoskin
- Cinematography: Leonid Kraynenkov
- Edited by: Ekaterina Ovsyannikova
- Music by: Anatoli Lepin
- Production company: Mosfilm
- Release date: 1961
- Running time: 81 min.
- Country: Soviet Union
- Language: Russian

The Man from Nowhere (Russian: Человек ниоткуда, romanized: Chelovek niotkuda) is a 1961 Soviet science fiction-comedy film directed by Eldar Ryazanov.

The geologist of an anthropological expedition, Vladimir Porazhaev, is captured by the savages of the fantastic Tapi ("snow men") tribe but escapes with the help of his savviness.

== Plot ==
The film opens with a black-and-white prologue depicting an anthropological expedition in the Pamir Mountains. The protagonist, a young anthropologist named Vladimir Porazhayev, firmly believes in the existence of the legendary Tapi tribe, despite skepticism from his friend and expedition leader, Krohalyov. Porazhayev’s determination leads to a misstep—he falls into a ravine, hits his head on a boulder, and loses consciousness. This marks the transition to the main storyline, presented in color, where Porazhayev wakes up as a captive of the Tapi tribe. Tied to a post alongside a rebellious tribesman named Chudak, who is condemned for his unorthodox behavior, Porazhayev witnesses a tribal council led by a chief resembling Krohalyov. Using his wits, Porazhayev exploits the tribe’s superstitions and threats them with a passing satellite to secure freedom for himself and Chudak, whom he takes back to Moscow as his protégé.

In Moscow, Chudak—a comically naive yet curious figure—finds himself in a series of misadventures, from being mistaken for an athlete and winning a race to causing chaos in the city with his attempts to integrate into modern society. Porazhayev tries to teach him that true humanity comes from hard work, while Krohalyov, believing Porazhayev to be dead, pursues Lena, Porazhayev’s romantic interest. A pivotal moment occurs at a scientific conference, where Porazhayev proves the Tapi tribe’s existence while Chudak nearly eats Krohalyov in frustration over his dismissive attitude. Porazhayev’s efforts to protect his friend culminate in a surprising turn when Chudak, refusing to leave his mentor, sneaks aboard a rocket with Porazhayev, leading to an unplanned launch. The two bicker as they soar into space, only to land back in the Pamirs, where Chudak resolves to return to his tribe and teach them the ways of humanity.

The film concludes with a black-and-white epilogue revealing that the events were merely Porazhayev’s dream. He is awakened by his fellow expedition members but remains steadfast in his determination to find the elusive Tapi tribe.

== Cast ==
- Sergey Yursky as Chudak
- Yury Yakovlev as Vladimir Porazhayev
- Anatoliy Papanov as Krokhalyov
- Lyudmila Gurchenko as Lena
- Anatoly Adoskin as Mikhail
- Vladimir Muravyov as police captain
- Yuri Belov as Gavrilov
- Yuri Nikulin as petty officer
- Georgy Millyar as electrician
- Georgi Kulikov as assistant director at the theater
- Yevgeny Morgunov as Tapi cook

== Censored ==
At the XXII Congress of the CPSU on October 24, 1961, Mikhail Suslov condemned Ryazanov's film. After Suslov’s performance, the film was stopped everywhere and then banned. The ban was lifted only in 1988 by a decision of the Goskino of the USSR and the conflict committee of the Union of Cinematographers of the USSR, after which the film was again shown in cinemas.
