= Lev Durov =

Soviet/Russian theatre and film actor

- Лев Дуров
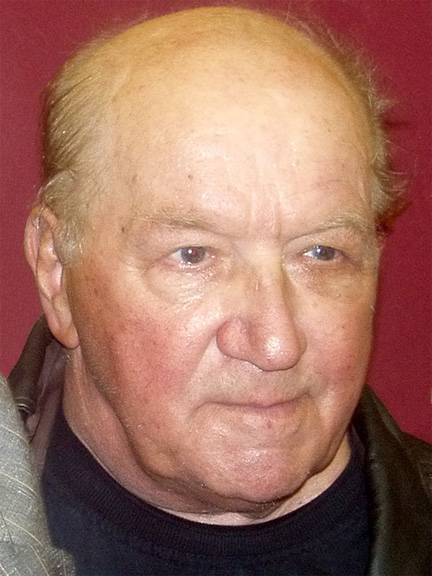
- Durov in 2008
- Born: 23 December 1931; Moscow, Russian SFSR, Soviet Union
- Died: 20 August 2015 (aged 83); Moscow, Russia
- Resting place: Novodevichy Cemetery, Moscow
- Occupation: Actor
- Years active: 1954–2015
- Website: levdurov.ru

Lev Konstantinovich Durov (Note: Russian: Лев Константинович Дуров, romanized: Lev Konstantinovich Durov, Russian pronunciation: [ˈlʲef kənstɐnʲˈtʲinəvʲɪdʑ ˈdurəf]) (23 December 1931 – 20 August 2015) was a Soviet and Russian theatre and film actor who appeared in more than 200 films and numerous stage productions between 1955 and 2008. He was named a People's Artist of the USSR in 1990.

== Early life and education ==
Durov came from the illustrious Durov family, whose members included memoirist Nadezhda Durova and animal trainer Anatoly Durov. His aunt's husband Prov Sadovsky Jr. ran the Maly Theatre in 1944–1947. Lev Durov married actress Irina Kirichenko (1931–2001) in 1954. Their daughter Ekaterina is also an actress.

Durov attended the Moscow Art Theatre School, where his teachers included Sergey Gerasimov and Sergey Blinnikov.

== Career ==
He joined the troupe of Anatoly Efros in 1954 and was a mainstay of Efros's productions until 1984. For some 30 years, he worked at the Malaya Bronnaya Theatre both as an actor and as a director. He was the theatre's principal director from 2003 to 2006.

Durov was also known for his voice acting, most notably, as Sharik the Dog in Three from Prostokvashino and its sequels. He published three books of memoirs, in 1999 and 2008.

== Death ==
Lev Durov died on 20 August 2015 and was buried at the Novodevichy Cemetery.

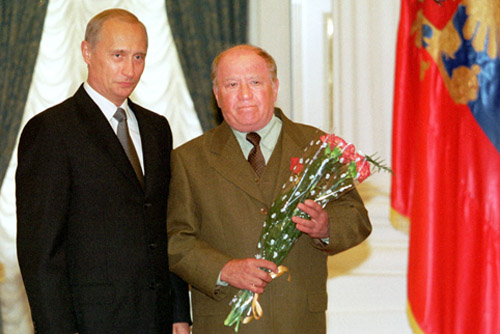
Presentation of the Order "For Merit to the Fatherland", 4th class (May 22, 2002)

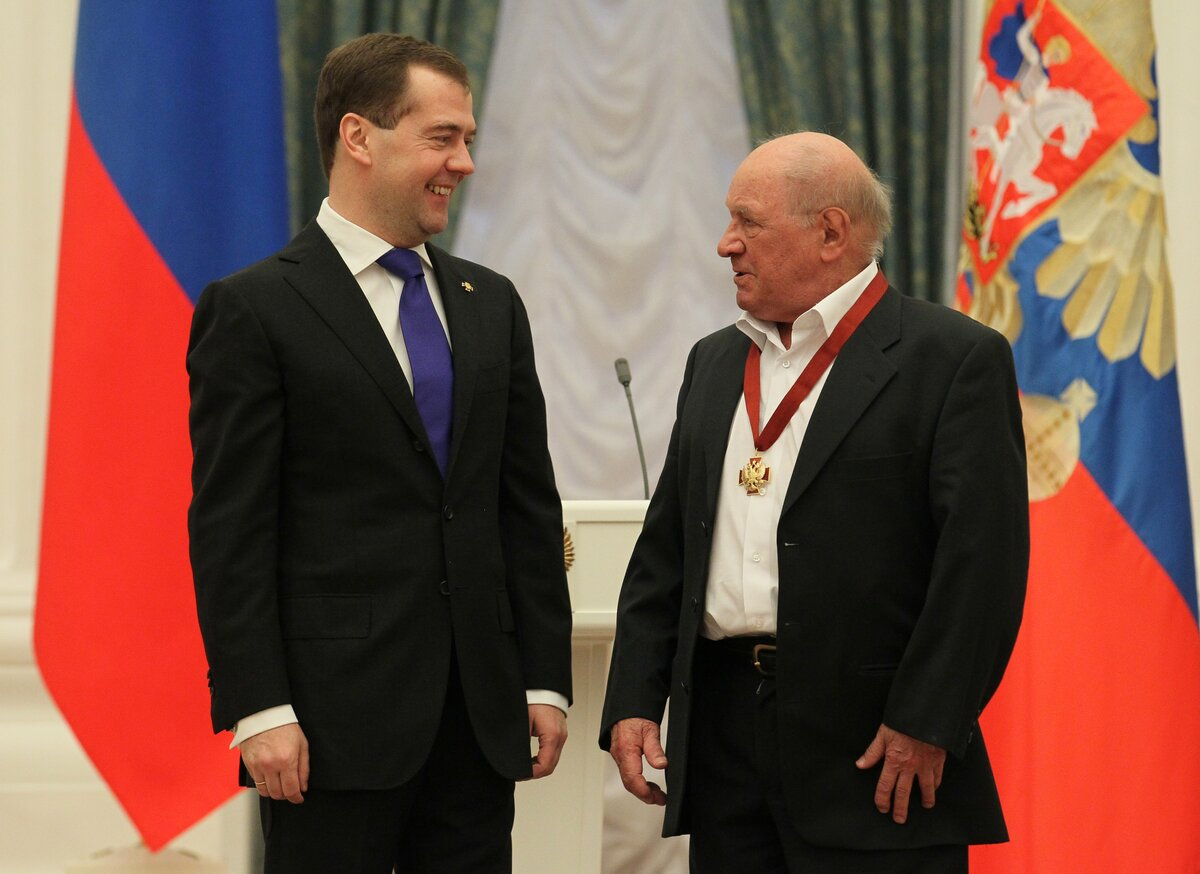
Presentation of the Order "For Merit to the Fatherland", 3rd class (29 December 2011)

== Selected filmography ==
=== Actor ===
- Nine Days in One Year (Девять дней одного года, 1962) – KGB officer
- I Step Through Moscow (Я шагаю по Москве, 1963) – police officer
- Lebedev against Lebedev (Лебедев против Лебедева, 1965) – a passenger in the subway
- I'm Going to Search (Иду искать, 1966) – Ivashov
- All The King's Men (Вся королевская рать, 1971) – Sugar Boy
- Stariki-razboyniki (Старики-разбойники, 1971) – driver
- Bumbarash (Бумбараш, 1971) – miller
- Big School-Break (Большая перемена, 1972) – police sergeant
- A Man at His Place (Человек на своём месте, 1972) – Ivan Maksimovich
- We rode the tram Ilf and Petrov (Ехали в трамвае Илья и Петров, 1972) – passerby / Gusev-Lebedev
- Moscow-Cassiopeia (Москва-Кассиопея, 1973) – Academician Filatov
- Seventeen Moments of Spring (Семнадцать мгновений весны, 1973) – agent Klaus
- Ksenia, Fedor's Beloved Wife (Ксения, любимая жена Фёдора, 1974) – Sidorov
- Teens in the Universe (Отроки во Вселенной, 1974) – Academician Filatov
- Diamonds for the Dictatorship of the Proletariat (Бриллианты для диктатуры пролетариата, 1975) — Pojamchi
- Armed and Dangerous (Вооружён и очень опасен, 1977) – Lucky Charlie
- Nose (Нос, 1977) – polizeimeister
- The Scarlet Flower (Аленький цветочек, 1977) – merchant
- D'Artagnan and Three Musketeers (Д'Артаньян и три мушкетёра, 1978) – de Tréville
- Adjacent-channel Rejection Ratio (Тут... недалеко, 1980) – Ryabyev
- Farewell (Прощание, 1986) – Pinegin
- Don't Be Afraid, I Am Here For You (Не бойся, я с тобой!, 1981) – San Sanych
- Express on Fire (34-й скорый, 1982) — Multya
- Lullabye for Brother (Колыбельная для брата, 1982) — Kirill's father
- Red Bells (Красные колокола, 1982) — Schreuder
- The Story of Voyages (Сказка странствий, 1983) – Gorgon the robber
- The Fourth Year of War (Шёл четвёртый год войны, 1983) – Khomutov
- Pippi Longstocking (Пеппи Длинныйчулок, 1984) — Stephensen
- Success (Успех, 1984) — Platonov
- How to Become Happy (Как стать счастливой, 1986) – old man-inventor
- A Man from the Boulevard des Capuchines (Человек с бульвара Капуцинов, 1987) – coffin maker
- The Mountains are Smoking (Горы дымят, 1989) – Akhilesku
- Anarchy (Беспредел, 1989) – Markelov
- Gardes-Marines III (Гардемарины III, 1992) – Cavalry general Denisov
- Don't Play the Fool (Не валяй дурака..., 1997) — grandfather
- Why Wouldn't We Send a Messenger? (Не послать ли нам гонца, 1998) – Yakov
- The Garden Was Full of Moon (Луной был полон сад, 2000) – Grigori Petrovich

=== Voice ===
- Three from Prostokvashino (1978) – voice of Sharik the dog
- The Fire-Fairy (1979) – the narrator / the grandfather
- Dog in Boots (1981) – voice of Foxhound and Fisherman's dog
