= Anatoly Adoskin =

Soviet and Russian actor (1927–2019)

- Born: Anatoly Mikhailovich Adoskin; 23 September 1927; Moscow, RSFSR, USSR
- Died: 20 March 2019 (aged 91); Moscow, Russia
- Occupation: actor
- Awards: People's Artist of the Russian Federation (1996)

Anatoly Mikhailovich Adoskin (Russian: Анатолий Михайлович Адоскин; 23 November 1927 – 20 March 2019) was a Soviet and Russian actor of theater and cinema. People's Artist of the Russian Federation (1996).

== Biography ==
Anatoly Adoskin graduated from the studio at the Mossovet Theater under the leadership of Yuri Zavadsky in 1948. At the end of the studio he was invited to the troupe of the theater.

In the movie, Adoskin made his debut in 1955 — Two Captains (director Vladimir Vengerov).

In 1961 he moved to the troupe of the Sovremennik. In 1965 he was invited to the Lenkom, and in 1968 he returned to the Mossovet Theater.

== Selected filmography ==
- Two Captains (1955) as Valya Zhukov
- The Man from Nowhere (1961) as Mikhail
- The Girls (1961) as Dementyev
- Seven Old Men and a Girl (1968) as Anatoly Sidorov
- The Brothers Karamazov (1969) as examining magistrate
- Moscow-Cassiopeia (1973) as Pasha's father
- Teens in the Universe (1974) as Pasha's father
- Lenin in Paris (1981) as agitator-menshevik
- Pippi Longstocking (1984) as director of puppet theatre
- House of Fools (2002) as Fuko
- 4 (2004) as Oleg's father

== Awards ==
- Honored Artist of the RSFSR (1981)
- People's Artist of the Russian Federation (1996)
- Order of Honour (2008)
