= Paraplatyptilia dugobae =

Scientific classification
- Kingdom: Animalia
- Phylum: Arthropoda
- Clade: Pancrustacea
- Class: Insecta
- Order: Lepidoptera
- Family: Pterophoridae
- Genus: Paraplatyptilia
- Species: P. dugobae

Binomial name
- Paraplatyptilia dugobae Gibeaux, 1997

Species of plume moth

Paraplatyptilia dugobae is a moth of the family Pterophoridae.
