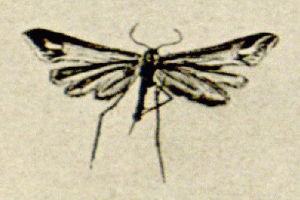
- Paraplatyptilia sahlbergi

Scientific classification
- Kingdom: Animalia
- Phylum: Arthropoda
- Clade: Pancrustacea
- Class: Insecta
- Order: Lepidoptera
- Family: Pterophoridae
- Subfamily: Pterophorinae
- Tribe: Platyptiliini
- Genus: Paraplatyptilia; Bigot & Picard, 1986

= Paraplatyptilia =

Genus of moths

Paraplatyptilia is a genus of moths in the family Pterophoridae.

== Species ==
- Paraplatyptilia albiciliatus
- Paraplatyptilia albidus
- Paraplatyptilia albidorsellus
- Paraplatyptilia albui
- Paraplatyptilia atlantica
- Paraplatyptilia auriga
- Paraplatyptilia azteca
- Paraplatyptilia baueri
- Paraplatyptilia bifida
- Paraplatyptilia carolina
- Paraplatyptilia catharodactyla
- Paraplatyptilia cooleyi
- Paraplatyptilia dugobae
- Paraplatyptilia edwardsii
- Paraplatyptilia fragilis
- Paraplatyptilia glacialis
- Paraplatyptilia grandis
- Paraplatyptilia hedemanni
- Paraplatyptilia immaculata
- Paraplatyptilia inanis
- Paraplatyptilia lineata
- Paraplatyptilia lutescens
- Paraplatyptilia maea
- Paraplatyptilia metzneri
- Paraplatyptilia modesta
- Paraplatyptilia nana
- Paraplatyptilia optata
- Paraplatyptilia petrodactylus
- Paraplatyptilia sabourini
- Paraplatyptilia sahlbergi
- Paraplatyptilia shastae
- Paraplatyptilia sibirica
- Paraplatyptilia terminalis
- Paraplatyptilia terskeyiensis
- Paraplatyptilia vacillans
- Paraplatyptilia watkinsi
- Paraplatyptilia xylopsamma
