= Innokenty Smoktunovsky =

Soviet and Russian actor (1925–1994)

- Иннокентий Смоктуновский
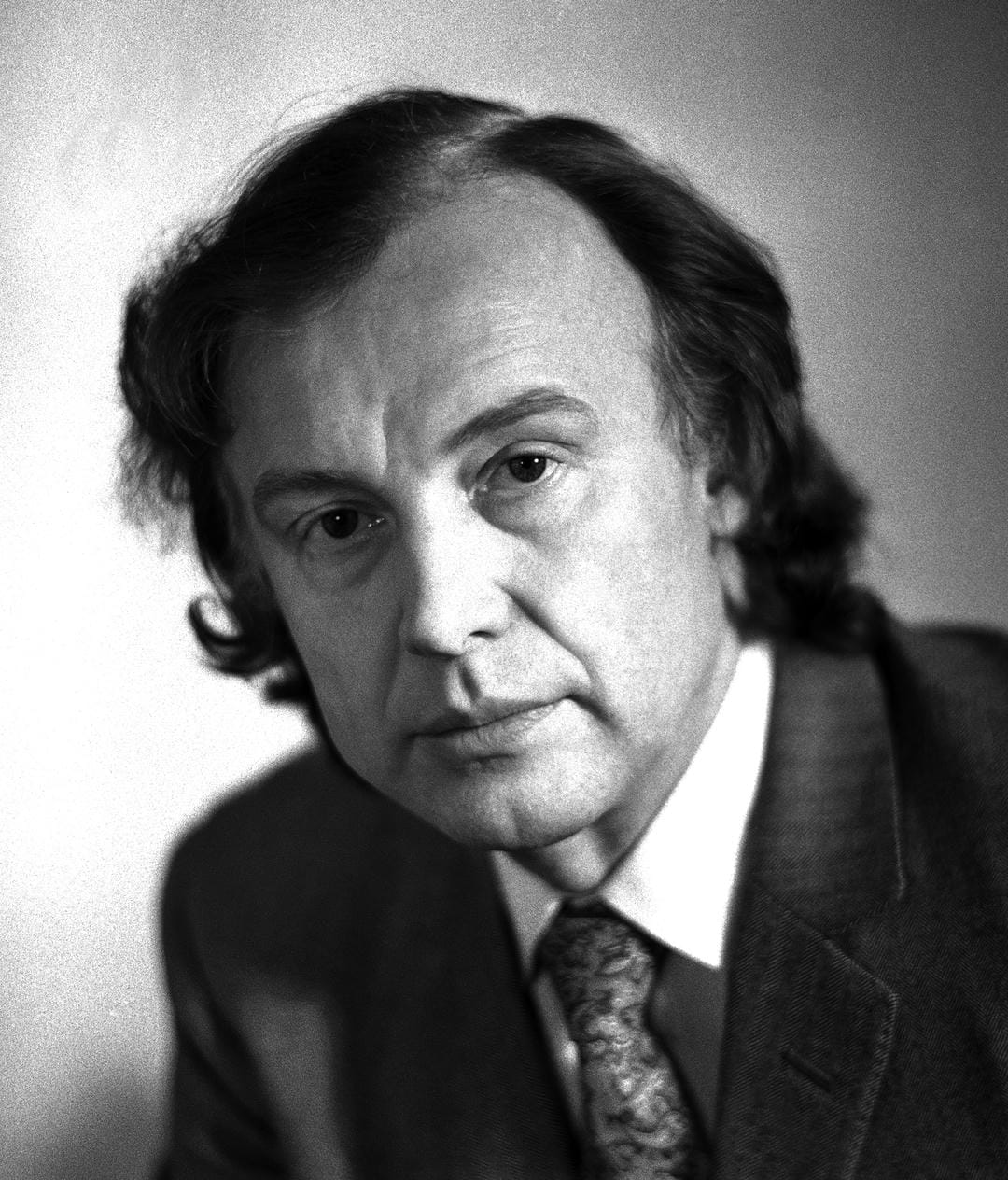
- Smoktunovsky in the 1970s
- Born: Innokenty Mikhailovich Smoktunovich; 28 March 1925; Tatyanovka, Tomsk Governorate, RSFSR, Soviet Union
- Died: 3 August 1994 (aged 69); Moscow, Russia
- Resting place: Novodevichy Cemetery, Moscow
- Occupation: Actor
- Years active: 1946–1994
- Title: People's Artist of the USSR (1974); Hero of Socialist Labour (1990)
- Spouse: Shulamith Kushnir
- Children: 3

Innokenty Mikhailovich Smoktunovsky (Russian: Иннокентий Михайлович Смоктуновский; born Smoktunovich, 28 March 1925 – 3 August 1994) was a Soviet and Russian stage and film actor. He was named a People's Artist of the USSR in 1974 and a Hero of Socialist Labour in 1990.

== Early life ==
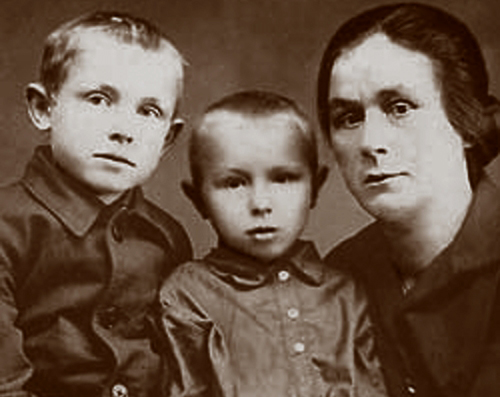
Smoktunovsky (left) with his brother Vladimir and aunt in 1930

Smoktunovsky was born in a Siberian village in a peasant family of Belarusian ethnicity. It was once rumored that he came from a Polish family, even nobility, but the actor himself denied these theories by stating his family was Belarusian and not of nobility. He served in the Red Army during World War II and fought in the battles of Kursk, the Dnieper, and Kiev. In 1946, he joined a theatre in Krasnoyarsk, later moving to Moscow. In 1957, he was invited by Georgy Tovstonogov to join the Bolshoi Drama Theatre of Leningrad, where he stunned the public with his dramatic interpretation of Prince Myshkin in Dostoevsky's The Idiot. One of his best roles was the title role in Aleksey Konstantinovich Tolstoy's Tsar Fyodor Ioannovich (Maly Theatre, 1973).

== Film career ==
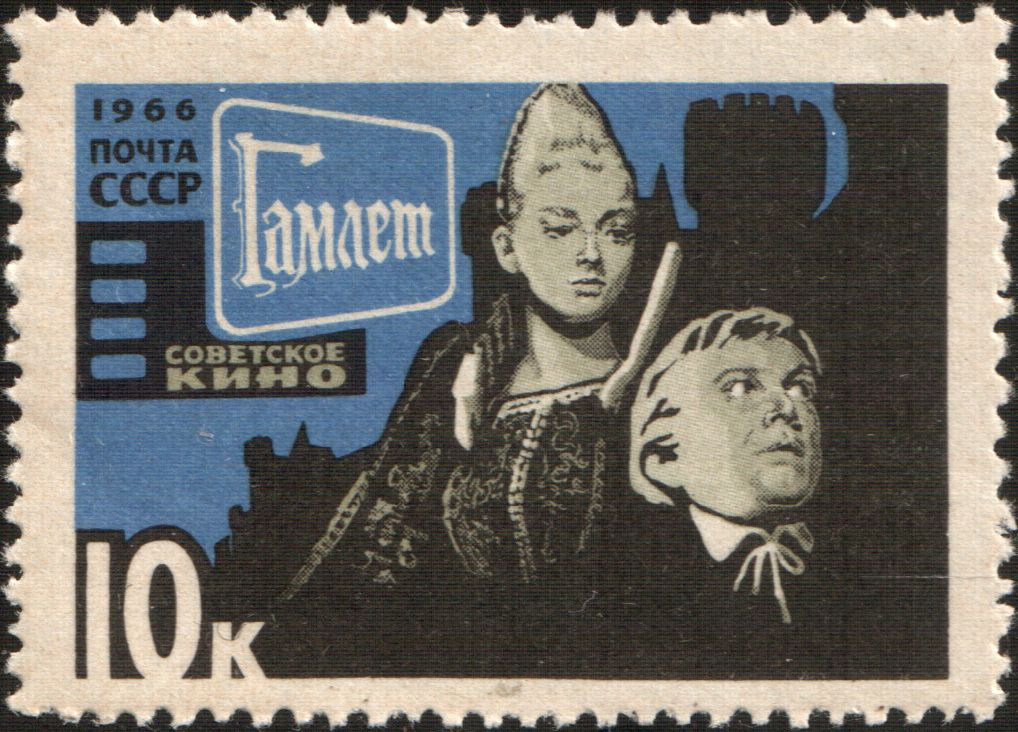
Smoktunovsky as Prince Hamlet with Anastasiya Vertinskaya on a 1966 Soviet stamp

His career in film was launched by Mikhail Romm's film Nine Days in One Year (1962).

In 1964, he was cast in the role of Prince Hamlet in Grigori Kozintsev's celebrated screen version of Shakespeare's play, which won him the Lenin Prize. Smoktunovsky's performance received praise from Laurence Olivier, who wrote to director Grigori Kozintsev: "Your ''Hamlet'' is the most brilliant I have ever seen."

British critics praised the film. Peter Brook called it "of special interest" and noted its "gigantic merit". Dilys Powell described Smoktunovsky's acting as "of extraordinary intelligence – a Hamlet who is not merely melancholy but actively dangerous, a man who could kill with a word". Tom Milne wrote "Innokenti Smoktunovsky is a forceful, sane, sensitive Hamlet trapped in a prison of political intrigue". Penelope Gilliatt, a future scriptwriter of "Sunday Bloody Sunday" observed on 18 April 1965: "Kozintsev's film is the most exciting Shakespeare on screen since Olivier... A Hamlet of rare sensitivity and power".

Smoktunovsky created an integral heroic portrait, which blended together what seemed incompatible before: manly simplicity and exquisite aristocratism, kindness and caustic sarcasm, a derisive mindset and self-sacrifice.

Smoktunovsky became known to wider audiences as Yuri Detochkin in Eldar Ryazanov's detective satire Beware of the Car (1966), which revealed the actor's outstanding comic gifts. Later, he played Pyotr Ilyich Tchaikovsky in Tchaikovsky (1969), Uncle Vanya in Andrei Konchalovsky's screen version of Chekhov's play (1970), the Narrator in Andrei Tarkovsky's Mirror (1975), an old man in Anatoly Efros's On Thursday and Never Again (1977), and Salieri in Mikhail Schweitzer's Little Tragedies (1979) based on Alexander Pushkin's plays.

In 1990, Smoktunovsky won the Nika Award in the category Best Actor. He died on 3 August 1994, at a sanatorium, aged 69. The minor planet 4926 Smoktunovskij was named after him.

== Filmography ==
- Murder on Dante Street (1956) as Young fascist
- Soldiers (1956) as Lieutenant Farber
- Close to Us (1958) as Andrei
- Letter Never Sent (1960) as Konstantin Sabinin
- Until Next Spring (1960) as Aleksei Ruchyev
- After the Wedding (1962) as Narrator's voice
- Nine Days in One Year (1962) as Ilya Kulikov
- Mozart and Salieri (1962) as Wolfgang Amadeus Mozart
- Hamlet (1964) as Prince Hamlet
- On the Same Planet (1965) as Vladimir Lenin
- Beware of the Car (1966) as Yuri Detochkin
- Degree of Risk (1968) as Aleksandr Kirillov
- The Living Corpse (1968) as Ivan Petrovich
- Crime and Punishment (1969) as Porfiry Petrovich
- Tchaikovsky (1970) as Pyotr Ilyich Tchaikovsky
- Uncle Vanya (1970) as Ivan "Uncle Vanya" Voinitsky
- Ilf and Petrov Rode a Tram (1972) as Tram passenger
- Taming of the Fire (1972) as Konstantin Tsiolkovsky
- Moscow-Cassiopeia (1973) as I.O.O.
- The Heron and the Crane (1974) as Narrator's voice
- Daughters-Mothers (1974) as Vadim Antonovich Vasilyev
- A Lover's Romance (1974) as Trumpeter
- Teens in the Universe (1974) as I.O.O.
- Take Aim (1974) as Franklin D. Roosevelt
- Mirror (1975) as adult Aleksei's voice
- The Captivating Star of Happiness (1975) as Ivan Bogdanovich Zeidler
- They Fought for Their Country (1975) as Surgeon
- Twenty Days Without War (1976) as Vyacheslav's voice (played by Nikolai Grinko)
- Trust (1976) as Nikolay Bobrikov
- The Princess on a Pea (1977) as King
- The Steppe (1977) as Moisei Moiseyevich
- On Thursday and Never Again (1977) as Ivan Modestovich
- The Barrier (1979) as Antony Manev
- Moscow Does Not Believe in Tears (1979) as himself (cameo appearance)
- Little Tragedies (1979) as Antonio Salieri and Old Baron
- The Queen of Spades (1982) as Chekalinsky
- Dead Souls (1984) as Plyushkin
- Primary Russia (1985) as Emperor Justinian I
- The Last Road (1986) as Jacob van Heeckeren tot Enghuizen
- The Twentieth Century Approaches (1986) as Lord Thomas Bellinger
- Dark Eyes (1987) as Modest Petrovich
- Gardes-Marines, Ahead! (1987) as André-Hercule de Fleury
- First Encounter - Last Encounter (1987) as Counterintelligence colonel
- Mother (1989) as Governor
- Trap for a Lonely Man (1990) as Merluche
- Genius (1991) as Mafia leader Gilya
- Dandelion Wine (1997) as Colonel Freeley (voiced by Sergey Bezrukov; released posthumously)
