= Teens in the Universe =

- Отроки во Вселенной
- Directed by: Richard Viktorov
- Written by: Isai Kuznetsov; Avenir Zak
- Starring: Innokenti Smoktunovsky; Vasili Merkuryev; Lev Durov
- Distributed by: Gorky Film Studio
- Release date: 1975
- Running time: 84 min
- Country: Soviet Union

Teens in the Universe (Russian: Отроки во Вселенной, romanized: Otroki vo vselennoy) is a 1975 Soviet science fiction film directed by Richard Viktorov based on a script by Isai Kuznetsov and Avenir Zak about teenage space travelers. It was preceded by Moscow-Cassiopeia (1973), the first part. The film premiered on March 24, 1975 at the Cosmos cinema in Moscow.

== Synopsis ==
The crewmembers of Zarya (Note: ZARYa, ЗАРЯ, acronym literlly menas for Russian: Звездолёт Аннигиляционный Релятивистский Ядерный, "Relativistic Annihilation Nuclear Starship", the word literally means "dawn") starship supposed to mature during 27-year-long flight, unexpectedly arrive to the Shedar system after less than one year of local time travel. Remote sensing verifies that one of the planets is very much Earth-like. Three of the crew members should land on the new planet. They use the reconnaissance capsule and encounter the apparently abandoned planet. But the "extra" member of the crew, a stowaway, Lobanov meets strange more or less human-like creatures that escort him and his mates to the underground city. They become unreachable for radio communications.

During this communications outage the orbiting Zarya rendezvous with another giant spaceship. The commander of that ship explains that their home planet is populated only by the two kinds of bionic robots - executors and far more advanced rulers. These robots were invented two centuries ago, but after some period of good work, rulers tried to improve humans, as well as the nature of the planet. Unfortunately, this "improvement" led to the total aloofness of the processed people, including suppression of love and reproductive behaviour. After a century and a half all population of the planet was dead. Only the space radio observatory station crew was unreachable for the robotic "care".

Zarya crew sets up the second capsule to rescue the crew members captured by robots. Agapit, the son of the station commander, will be their guide in the underground city. After some troubles, boys counterfeit the recharging request from the power plant and burn up all robots at the planet, making it free for people from the space station.

== Cast ==
- Innokenti Smoktunovsky as I.O.O. (Extraordinary Service Executive)
- Lev Durov as academician Filatov
- Yuri Medvedev as academician Ogon-Duganovsky

=== Space ship Zarya crew ===
- Mikhail Yershov as Vitya Sereda
- Aleksandr Grigoryev as Pasha Kozelkov
- Vladimir Savin as Misha Kopanygin
- Vladimir Basov Jr. as Fedya "Lob" Lobanov
- Olga Bityukova as Varya Kuteishchikova
- Nadezhda Ovcharova as Yulia Sorokina
- Irina Popova as Katya Panfyorova

=== Other cast ===
- Vadim Ledogorov as Agapit
- Igor Ledogorov as Agapit's father
- Natalya Fateyeva as Pasha Kozelkov's mom
- Anatoly Adoskin as Pasha Kozelkov's dad
- Aleksandr Lenkov as Robot Executor
- Nikolai Pogodin as Robot Executor
- Raisa Ryazanova as Ludmila Okorokova
- S. Safonov as Robot Executor
- Nadezhda Semyontsova as Nadezhda Filatova
- Vladimir Shiryayev as Robot Executor
- Olga Soshnikova as Irina Kondratievna
- Aleksandr Vigdorov as Mikhail Kondratievitch
- Mikhail Yanushkevich as journalist
- Aleksandr Yanvaryov as brother of Pasha Kozelkov
- Aleksandr Zimin as Robot Executor
- Arkadi Markin as brother of Pasha Kozelkov before the flight (uncredited)
- Mikhail Yeremeyev as Robot Executor

== Awards ==
- Prize for the Best Film for Kids and Youth of the All-Union Cinema Festival, Kishinev, 1975
- Special jury prize of the Trieste International Science Fiction Film Festival, 1976
- Grand prize of the International Festival at Panama, 1976
- Vasilyev Brothers State Prize of the RSFSR (Russian Soviet Federative Socialist Republic) in the honour of Vasilyev brothers, 1977.
