= Natalya Fateyeva =

Russian actress a

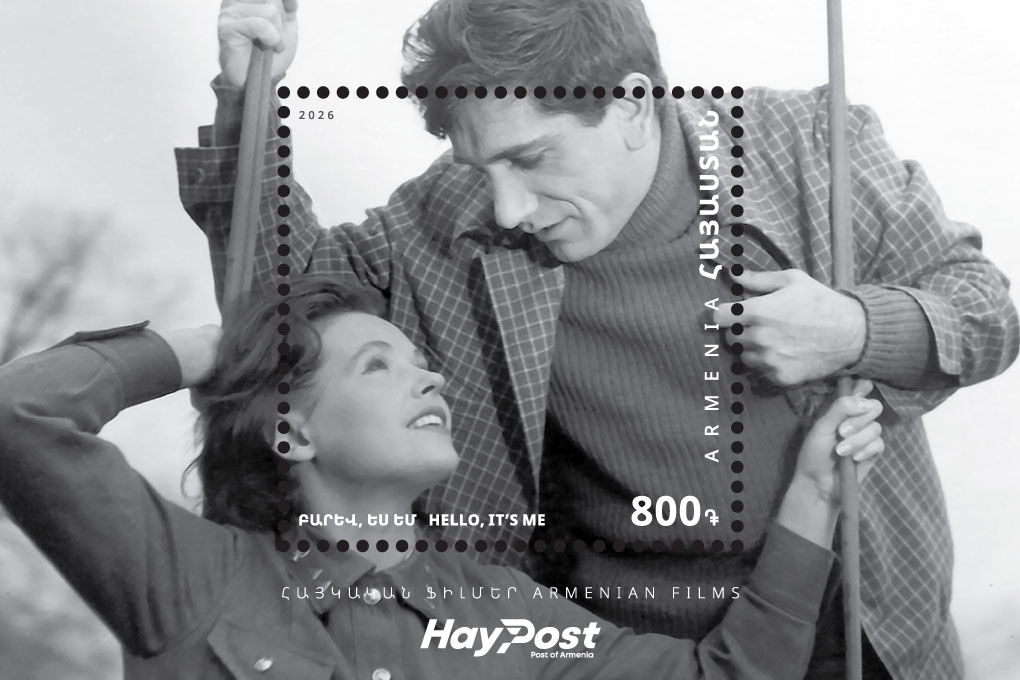
- Fateyeva in the 1966 film Hello, That's Me! on a 2026 stamp sheet of Armenia
- Born: Natalya Nikolayevna Fateyeva; 23 December 1934 (age 91); Kharkiv, Ukrainian SSR, Soviet Union
- Occupations: Actress, television presenter
- Years active: 1956–2013

Natalya Nikolayevna Fateyeva (Russian: Наталья Николаевна Фатеева; born 23 December 1934) is a Soviet and Russian film actress and television presenter. She has appeared in more than fifty films since 1956. People's Artist of the RSFSR (1980).

== Biography ==
Natalya Nikolayevna Fateyeva was born and brought up in Kharkiv. Her father was a Soviet military officer, and her mother was a manager of a local fashion shop. She studied acting at Kharkiv Acting College during the 1950s and was briefly married to a student classmate, but soon she divorced the student and moved to Moscow. There, after meeting Sergei Gerasimov, Fateyeva was admitted to the graduate year at VGIK acting school.

She was voted "the most beautiful Soviet actress" in the early 1960s by readers of the Soviet film magazine Sovetsky Ekran, and other publications.

Natalya Fateyeva was married, and divorced, three times. She has two children, a son and a daughter. She lives in Moscow, Russia.

== Political position and social activity ==
Natalya Fateyeva was awarded the Medal "Defender of a Free Russia" by president Boris Yeltsin for her active position defending democracy in Russia. In 1999, Fateyeva was awarded the Order of Honour for her achievements in the art of cinema.

Natalya Fateyeva was a member of People's Freedom Party (Russia) and also was associated with the leadership of the United Democratic Movement Solidarnost until both political parties were banned and dissolved in Russia.

In 2014 and 2022, she condemned both the annexation of Crimea and the Russian invasion of Ukraine.

== Filmography ==
Film
Year	Title	Role	Notes
1958	The Variegateds Case	Lena	
1963	Three Plus Two	Zoya Pavlovna	
1965	Children of Don Quixote	Marina Nikolayevna	
1965	Hello, That's Me!	Lyusya	
1970	Songs of the Sea	Nina Denisova	
1971	Gentlemen of Fortune	Lyudmila Maltseva	
1973	Moscow-Cassiopeia	Antonina Alekseyevna	
1974	Teens in the Universe	Antonina Alekseyevna	
1974	Countermeasure	Nina Vasilyevna Pavlova	
1975	You will find it in battle	Alla Grebenschikova	
1976	Practical Joke	Kaleriya Georgiyevna	
1977	Bag of the Collector	Kseniya Nikolayevna Kovalyova	
1978	A moment decides everything	Elena Pavlovna Ryzhova	
1979	The Meeting Place Cannot Be Changed	Ingrid Karlovna Sobolevskaya	
1981	Syndicate-2	Lyubov Efimovna Derental	
1983	From the Life of a Chief of the Criminal Police	Tatyana Georgiyevna	
1983	Anna Pavlova	Mathilde Kschessinska	
1987	A Man from the Boulevard des Capucines	Squaw, Comanche chief's wife	
1991	Anna Karamazoff	Poisoned general's wife	
1998	Day of the Full Moon	Railroad inspector	
2007	Korolev	Sergei Korolev's mother	
