= Paraplatyptilia azteca =

Scientific classification
- Kingdom: Animalia
- Phylum: Arthropoda
- Class: Insecta
- Order: Lepidoptera
- Family: Pterophoridae
- Genus: Paraplatyptilia
- Species: P. azteca

Binomial name
- Paraplatyptilia azteca Gielis, 1996

Species of plume moth

Paraplatyptilia azteca is a moth of the family Pterophoridae that is known from Mexico.

The wingspan is 21–23 millimetres (0.83–0.91 in). Adults are on wing in July.
