= Farewell, Doves =

- East German film poster
- Russian: Прощайте, голуби!
- Directed by: Yakov Segel
- Written by: Yakov Segel
- Produced by: Alexander Yablochkin
- Starring: Aleksei Loktev; Valentina Telegina; Svetlana Savyolova
- Cinematography: Yuri Ilyenko
- Edited by: L. Rodionova
- Music by: Mark Fradkin
- Production company: Yalta Film Studio
- Release date: 1960
- Running time: 97 min.
- Country: Soviet Union
- Language: Russian

Farewell, Doves (Russian: Прощайте, голуби!, romanized: Proshchayte, golubi!) is a 1960 Soviet teen drama film directed by Yakov Segel. Film gained recognition with two international film festivals: Locarno Film Festival in Switzerland (1961) and Melbourne International Film Festival in Australia (1962). In fact with the results of Locarno Film Festival (1961) film "Farewell, Doves" got the reward FIPRESCI from International Federation of Film Critics.

== Plot ==
Genka Sakhnenko studies at the school and works. But he, practically an adult and independent person, has one secret: after work, he climbs onto the dovecote. He has had a passion for pigeons since childhood. Genka is pleased with the work (he will even outwit his colleague, master Maxim Petrovich, who loves to take from tenants for work), but one day, having injured his hand, he ended up in the hospital, where he became friends with nurse Tanya. However, after a while, on the Komsomol voucher, Genka had to leave to work in another city, and he presented his pigeons to the first grader.

== Cast ==
- Aleksei Loktev as Genka Sakhnenko
- Valentina Telegina as Mariya Yefimovna
- Sergei Plotnikov as Maksim Petrovich
- Yevgeni Anufriyev as electrician
- Valentin Bryleev as motorcycle buyer
- Vladimir Dibrov as Pyotr
- Leonid Gallis as Konstantin Bulatov
- Svetlana Savyolova as Tanya
- Yevgeny Kovalenko as Semyon
- Saveliy Kramarov as Vaska

== Film Shooting ==
Shooting took place in Kyiv Khreschatyk Street and Maidan Nezalezhnosti (back then Kalinin Square). Many of the scenes were filmed in Kyiv’ microdistrict Chokolivka, namely Aviaconstructor Antonov Street, Umanska Street and Chokolivsky Boulevard.
