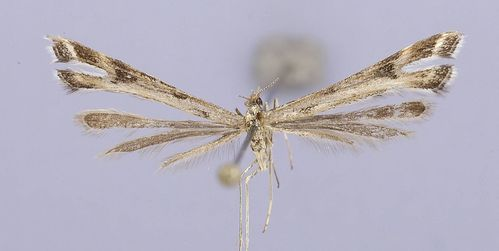

Scientific classification
- Kingdom: Animalia
- Phylum: Arthropoda
- Clade: Pancrustacea
- Class: Insecta
- Order: Lepidoptera
- Family: Pterophoridae
- Genus: Paraplatyptilia
- Species: P. albui

Binomial name
- Paraplatyptilia albui Gielis, 2008

= Paraplatyptilia albui =

Species of plume moth

Paraplatyptilia albui is a moth of the family Pterophoridae. It is found in North America, including the type location Echo Lake in Clear Creek County, Colorado.
