= Paraplatyptilia immaculata =

Scientific classification
- Kingdom: Animalia
- Phylum: Arthropoda
- Class: Insecta
- Order: Lepidoptera
- Family: Pterophoridae
- Genus: Paraplatyptilia
- Species: P. immaculata

Binomial name
- Paraplatyptilia immaculata (McDunnough, 1939)

Synonyms
- Platyptilia immaculata McDunnough, 1939

Species of plume moth

Paraplatyptilia immaculata is a moth of the family Pterophoridae first described by James Halliday McDunnough in 1939. It is found in North America, including California.

The wingspan is about 27 millimetres (1.1 in).
