= Paraplatyptilia shastae =

Scientific classification
- Kingdom: Animalia
- Phylum: Arthropoda
- Class: Insecta
- Order: Lepidoptera
- Family: Pterophoridae
- Genus: Paraplatyptilia
- Species: P. shastae

Binomial name
- Paraplatyptilia shastae (Walsingham, 1880)

Synonyms
- Platyptilus shastae Walsingham, 1880; Platyptilia shastae

Species of plume moth

Paraplatyptilia shastae is a moth of the family Pterophoridae. It is found in North America (including California, Alberta and Manitoba).

The wingspan is about 20 millimetres (0.79 in). The head and palpi are white. The thorax is dusted with cinereous and the abdomen is yellowish white. The forewings are narrow, whitish and dusted with cinereous speckles, especially along the costa. There is a brown triangular costal patch, followed by a pale space. A brown line runs along the base of the white fringes and a very slender whitish line runs parallel to the apical margin, terminating in a white dash on the costa. The hindwings are pale cinereous.
