= Paraplatyptilia bifida =

Scientific classification
- Kingdom: Animalia
- Phylum: Arthropoda
- Class: Insecta
- Order: Lepidoptera
- Family: Pterophoridae
- Genus: Paraplatyptilia
- Species: P. bifida

Binomial name
- Paraplatyptilia bifida (Lange, 1950)

Synonyms
- Platyptilia bifida Lange, 1950

Species of plume moth

Paraplatyptilia bifida is a moth of the family Pterophoridae. It is found in North America.
