= Soldiers (film) =

- Russian: Солдаты
- Directed by: Aleksandr Ivanov
- Written by: Viktor Nekrasov
- Starring: Vsevolod Safonov; Innokentiy Smoktunovskiy; Tamara Loginova; Leonid Kmit; Nikolay Pogodin
- Cinematography: Vyacheslav Fastovich
- Music by: Oleg Karavaychuk
- Release date: 1956
- Running time: 106 minute
- Country: Soviet Union
- Language: Russian

Soldiers (Russian: Солдаты) is a 1956 Soviet World War II film directed by Aleksandr Ivanov.

The film takes place during the Great Patriotic War, as the Eastern Front of World War II is described in Russia. The film talks about Lieutenant Kerzhentsev, his connected Valega and intelligence officer Sedykh, who are heading for Stalingrad.

== Plot ==
=== On the Eve of the Battle of Stalingrad ===
July 1942. Three comrades retreat from the Battle of Kharkov: 28-year-old Lieutenant Kerzhentsev (Vsevolod Safonov), his runner Valega (Yuri Solovyov), and regimental scout Ivan Sedykh (Vladimir Kovalkov). They travel alongside a crowd of refugees, passing through Ukrainian villages on their way to Stalingrad. For a brief respite, they stay with a family of a veteran builder from the Stalingrad Tractor Factory (Evgeny Teterin), where Kerzhentsev meets the builder's daughter, Lyusya (Tatyana Loginova), who works at a hospital.

Kerzhentsev and Lyusya take a walk along the Volga embankment and visit Mamayev Kurgan, which at the time is still unfamiliar to most Soviet citizens. Kerzhentsev strikes Lyusya as reserved and pragmatic. Before the war, he had intended to become an engineer—he received his diploma on June 19, 1941, and bought a brand-new drafting compass the next day. However, the war upended his plans, and he was drafted into the engineering corps. Now, even as he surveys Mamayev Kurgan, he evaluates it from a purely strategic perspective, considering how best to position machine guns and organize defenses. War has made him a realist: > "Even when I look at the moon, I consider its usefulness in warfare."

The next morning, Kerzhentsev bids farewell to Lyusya, who is carried off into the still-peaceful city by a tram.

=== Battalion Commander ===
Lieutenant Kerzhentsev is assigned to the 184th Rifle Division, taking command of a battalion after its previous commander is killed. The unit is severely understrength, consisting of only 36 men instead of the typical 400, though each soldier is portrayed as exceptionally brave.

Among them are regimental scouts from the Soviet Navy, led by the bold and outspoken Chumak (Leonid Kmit, known for his role as Petka in Chapayev). Kerzhentsev initially clashes with Chumak. Other members of the battalion include Farber (Innokenty Smoktunovsky), an intellectual and romantic who always carries a notebook, and squad leader Karnaoukhov, who decorates his bunker with a portrait of Jack London and cherishes a copy of Martin Eden.

=== Two Trenches ===
The battalion receives an order from the divisional commander to capture the first two lines of German positions on the strategic heights near the "Metiz" factory at Mamayev Kurgan. Kerzhentsev successfully takes the first line with minimal losses. However, the regiment's chief of staff, Captain Abrosimov, seeking to impress his superiors, issues a reckless order to attack the second line at dawn under heavy rain and enemy fire.

The ill-fated assault costs half of the battalion their lives. Among the fallen is Karnaoukhov, who dies in Kerzhentsev’s arms.

At a party meeting, Abrosimov is demoted to private for his fatal mistake. Farber delivers an impassioned speech about the senselessness of such orders.

=== Wounded ===
Kerzhentsev is seriously wounded during a German artillery strike. Valega transports him to a hospital where Lyusya, now a doctor, helps him recover. A romance develops between them. Once his injuries heal, Kerzhentsev returns to duty in the devastated Stalingrad. He notes with satisfaction the growing order amidst the chaos of the siege and the arrival of new equipment at the front.

Approaching the "Metiz" factory, Kerzhentsev revisits the trenches where his battalion and Karnaoukhov made their stand. He reunites with Chumak and Ivan Sedykh, who proudly displays a military decoration. They come across a captured Leica camera, and under Farber’s guidance—“shutter speed at one-hundredth, aperture at eight”—Kerzhentsev takes a photograph of his comrades.

The film closes with this photograph displayed on a wall, accompanied by Kerzhentsev’s voiceover expressing a hope that future generations will never know the horrors of war. This is the essence of the film’s trench-level truth: to fight so that there will one day be peace.

== Cast ==
- Vsevolod Safonov as Kerzhentsev
- Innokentiy Smoktunovskiy
- Tamara Loginova
- Leonid Kmit
- Nikolay Pogodin
- Oleg Dashkevich as Soldier
- Lyudmila Markeliya
- Yury Solovyov
- Evgeniy Teterin
