= Paraplatyptilia optata =

Scientific classification
- Kingdom: Animalia
- Phylum: Arthropoda
- Class: Insecta
- Order: Lepidoptera
- Family: Pterophoridae
- Genus: Paraplatyptilia
- Species: P. optata

Binomial name
- Paraplatyptilia optata (Yano, 1963)

Synonyms
- Platyptilia optata Yano, 1963

Species of plume moth

Paraplatyptilia optata is a moth of the family Pterophoridae that is known from Japan (Kyushu) and Korea.

The length of the forewings is about 11 millimetres (0.43 in).
