= Paraplatyptilia xylopsamma =

Scientific classification
- Kingdom: Animalia
- Phylum: Arthropoda
- Class: Insecta
- Order: Lepidoptera
- Family: Pterophoridae
- Genus: Paraplatyptilia
- Species: P. xylopsamma

Binomial name
- Paraplatyptilia xylopsamma (Meyrick, 1908)

Synonyms
- Platyptilia xylopsamma Meyrick, 1908; Stenoptilia schwarzi Dyar, 1903; Stenoptilia gorgoniensis Grinnell, 1908

Species of plume moth

Paraplatyptilia xylopsamma is a moth of the family Pterophoridae that is found in the United States in Colorado, Utah and California.

The wingspan is about 28 millimetres (1.1 in). The head is light yellow-ocherous sprinkled with whitish. The antennae are whitish-ocherous, with a dark fuscous line above. The thorax is brownish-ocherous sprinkled with whitish and the abdomen is whitish-ocherous, faintly streaked with brownish. The forewings are brownish-ocherous, slightly sprinkled with whitish, although the dorsal half is suffused with pale whitish-ocherous from the base to the cleft. The hindwings are ferruginous-fuscous.
