= Paraplatyptilia grandis =

Scientific classification
- Kingdom: Animalia
- Phylum: Arthropoda
- Class: Insecta
- Order: Lepidoptera
- Family: Pterophoridae
- Genus: Paraplatyptilia
- Species: P. grandis

Binomial name
- Paraplatyptilia grandis (Walsingham, 1880)

Synonyms
- Platyptilus grandis Walsingham, 1880

Species of plume moth

Paraplatyptilia grandis is a moth of the family Pterophoridae. It is found in North America (including California).

The wingspan is about 36 mm. The head and thorax are pale fawn. The antennae are brownish fawn color, spotted with white above and the frontal tuft is fawn color. The legs are very pale. The forewings are pale fawn, with the costa and triangular blotch fuscous. There are two brownish, elongated dots near the middle of the wing, the larger one nearer the base. The lobes are crossed by a pale wavy streak parallel and near to the outer margin. There is also a brown line at the base of the fringes, which are dark fuscous except near the anal angle, where they are pale. The hindwings are brownish fawn and the fringes are pale except on the hind margin of the third feather, where they are brownish.
