= Paraplatyptilia catharodactyla =

Scientific classification
- Kingdom: Animalia
- Phylum: Arthropoda
- Class: Insecta
- Order: Lepidoptera
- Family: Pterophoridae
- Genus: Paraplatyptilia
- Species: P. catharodactyla

Binomial name
- Paraplatyptilia catharodactyla (Gaj, 1959)

Synonyms
- Platyptilia catharodactyla Gaj, 1959

Species of plume moth

Paraplatyptilia catharodactyla is a moth of the family Pterophoridae. It was described by A. J. Gaj in 1959 and it is endemic to Kazakhstan.
