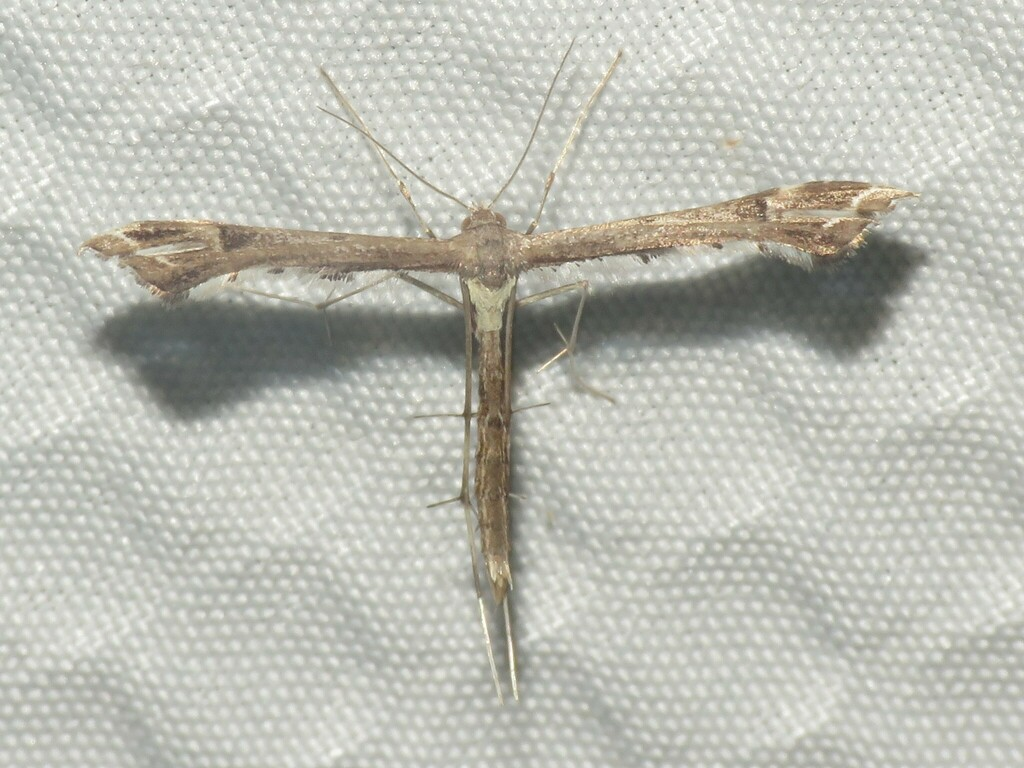

Scientific classification
- Kingdom: Animalia
- Phylum: Arthropoda
- Class: Insecta
- Order: Lepidoptera
- Family: Pterophoridae
- Genus: Paraplatyptilia
- Species: P. auriga

Binomial name
- Paraplatyptilia auriga (Barnes & Lindsey, 1921)

Synonyms
- Platyptilia auriga Barnes & Lindsey, 1921; Stenoptilodes auriga

= Paraplatyptilia auriga =

Species of plume moth

Paraplatyptilia auriga is a moth of the family Pterophoridae described by William Barnes and Arthur Ward Lindsey in 1921. It is found in eastern North America, including Florida, Mississippi, and New Jersey.

The wingspan is about 18 millimetres (0.71 in).

The larvae feed on Gerardia species and various Asteraceae species.
