= Outlawry (1989 film) =

- Russian: Беспредел
- Directed by: Igor Gostev
- Written by: Igor Gostev; Leonid Nikitinskij
- Starring: Andrey Tashkov; Anton Androsov; Aleksandr Mokhov; Lev Durov; Sergey Garmash
- Cinematography: Grigoriy Belenkiy
- Music by: Andrei Petrov
- Release date: 1989
- Running time: 102 minute
- Country: Soviet Union
- Language: Russian

Outlawry (Russian: Беспредел, lit. "boundlessness") is a 1989 Soviet crime drama film directed by Igor Gostev.

The film is based on the materials of the eponymous essay of Leonid Nikitinskij, published in the journal Ogoniok.

The film tells about the "cruel games" of prisoners and the important role of the administration, which controls them using a denunciation system.

== Plot ==
In a harsh correctional colony, a new prisoner, Kalgan, is sentenced to four years for assaulting his ex-girlfriend's new partner. Kalgan joins the tenth squad, led by a powerful prisoner known as Mogol and his gang, the "blacks," who dominate the colony's hierarchy. Soon, young inmate Viktor "Philatelist" Moshkin arrives, falsely convicted of stamp trading. Initially enduring brutal punishments, including a stint in solitary confinement, Kalgan eventually earns respect among inmates, who recognize his unyielding character. As he navigates the dangerous social dynamics, Kalgan receives an offer to become a foreman for the work squad, allowing him to avoid grueling labor. Meanwhile, Philatelist, disillusioned by the oppressive power structure, subtly encourages others to resist. Tensions reach a peak as Philatelist criticizes the work quotas that privilege the "blacks" and rejects their domination, leading the squad into a strike that alarms the prison administration.

This rebellion sets off a chain reaction that escalates into a tragedy. The "blacks," wary of Philatelist's growing influence, conspire to discredit him, and he is brutally assaulted after being accused of colluding with the authorities. The assault drives Philatelist to take his own life, spurring Kalgan and the other prisoners to avenge him. Kalgan retaliates, killing one of Mogol's henchmen, triggering a full-scale revolt among the inmates. The chaos culminates in a violent clash with security forces, with officers opening fire to quell the uprising. In the aftermath, Kalgan confronts "Kum," the manipulative officer responsible for Philatelist's death, accusing him of betrayal. As Kalgan is transferred to another prison, he symbolically holds up Philatelist's glasses—a token of their shared hope for justice—as a wounded officer, Khasimov, vows to support Kalgan's fight for survival.

== Cast ==
- Andrey Tashkov as Yuriy «Kalgan» Kolganov
- Anton Androsov as Viktor «Philatelist» Moshkin
- Aleksandr Mokhov
- Lev Durov
- Sergey Garmash as «Mogol»
- Nail Idrisov as «Piston»
- Aleksey Ablepikhin
- Aleksandr Kuznetsov as First Lieutenant Kasimov
- Irina Averina as Lena
- Mikhail Chigaryov as Major with megaphone
