= Saint Agapitus =

Saint Agapitus or Agapetus may refer to:

- Agapitus of Palestrina, died c. 274
- Pope Agapetus I, died 536
- Agapetus of the Kiev Caves, otherwise Agapetus or Agapitus of Pechersk, died 1095
