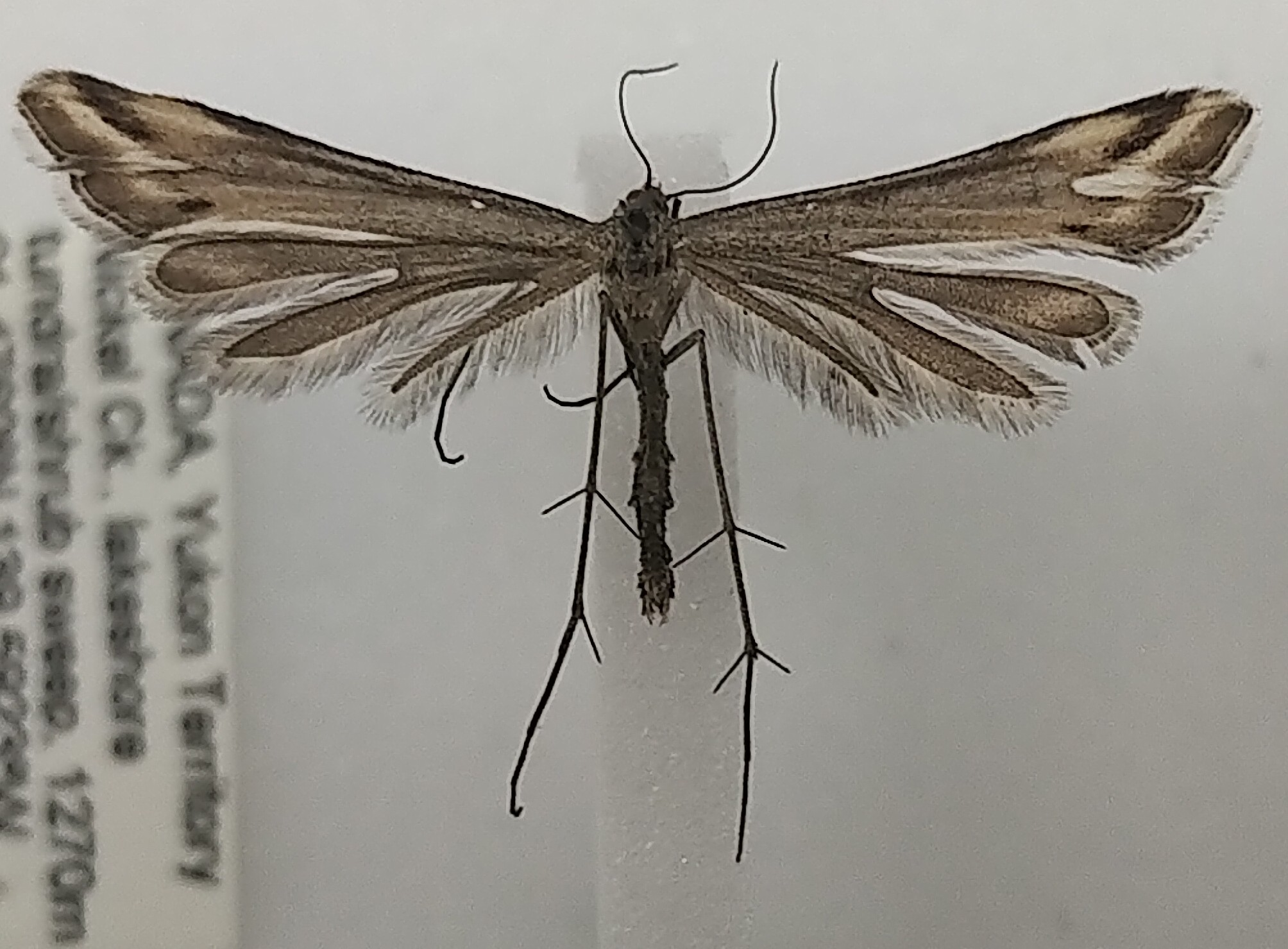

Scientific classification
- Kingdom: Animalia
- Phylum: Arthropoda
- Class: Insecta
- Order: Lepidoptera
- Family: Pterophoridae
- Genus: Paraplatyptilia
- Species: P. petrodactylus

Binomial name
- Paraplatyptilia petrodactylus (Walker, 1864)

Synonyms
- Pterophorus petrodactylus Walker, 1864; Paraplatyptilia petrodactyla; Platyptilia petrodactyla

= Paraplatyptilia petrodactylus =

Species of plume moth

Paraplatyptilia petrodactylus is a species of moth in the family Pterophoridae that is found in North America (including Iowa).

== Description ==
The wingspan is about 23 millimetres (0.91 in). The head, thorax and abdomen are shaded cinereous. The legs are cinereous and slightly thickened at the joints. The forewings are white, shaded with cinereous or ashy brown and the costa is brownish beyond the middle. There is an oblique brownish fuscous line, starting from the costa before the apex and extending inward more obliquely than the outer margin, but not reaching the fissure. This line is widest on the costa, tapering to a point inwardly, and is darker at its lower end. The fringes are white within the fissure, with a cinereous line found near their bases, shaded with fuscous at the anal angle. The hindwings are pale cinereous and the fringes are slightly darker towards the end of the feathers.
