= Walking the Streets of Moscow =

- Nikita Mikhalkov on the 1964 film poster.
- Russian: Я шагаю по Москве
- Directed by: Georgiy Daneliya
- Written by: Gennady Shpalikov
- Starring: Nikita Mikhalkov; Aleksei Loktev; Yevgeny Steblov; Galina Polskikh
- Cinematography: Vadim Yusov
- Edited by: Lidiya Lysenkova
- Music by: Andrey Petrov
- Production company: Mosfilm
- Release date: 11 April 1964
- Running time: 78 minutes
- Country: Soviet Union
- Language: Russian

Walking the Streets of Moscow (I Walk Around Moscow, Russian: Я шагаю по Москве) is a 1964 Soviet romantic comedy film directed by Georgiy Daneliya and produced by Mosfilm studios. It stars Nikita Mihalkov, Aleksei Loktev, Yevgeny Steblov and Galina Polskikh. The film also features four People's Artists of the USSR: Rolan Bykov, Vladimir Basov, Lev Durov, and Inna Churikova. The famous movie theme, performed by Mikhalkov, was written by the composer Andrey Petrov. The film, regarded as one of the most characteristic of the Khrushchev Thaw, premiered at the 1964 Cannes Film Festival and won a prize for the work of cameraman Vadim Yusov, best known for his subsequent collaboration with Andrei Tarkovsky.

== Plot summary ==
Volodya is an aspiring writer from Siberia. His first short story has just been published in the magazine Yunost ("Youth"); and a famous author, Voronin, has invited him to Moscow to discuss his work. In the Moscow Metro Volodya unexpectedly makes a friend, Kolya (Nikita Mikhalkov), who is returning home after a hard night shift. Volodya wants to stay at his old friends' home, but he doesn't know the exact street so Kolya decides to help him find it.

Unfortunately, a dog bites Volodya near Clean Ponds. Then Kolya decides to help his new friend again – they go to Kolya's home where Kolya's sister sews Volodya's trousers and introduces him to Kolya's large family. Volodya realizes that his old Moscow friends aren't in Moscow anymore (they left for south) and Volodya stays at Kolya's. Then Volodya goes for a walk.

At last alone, Kolya decided to sleep, but then came his old friend Sasha (Yevgeny Steblov). Sasha is in trouble – he was planning on marrying his fiancée Sveta today, but he has been called up for military service. He begs Kolya to help him. Kolya helps. Then two young men go to the GUM department store to buy a suit for a bridegroom and they meet Volodya there (Volody has recently bought a new suit for himself). The friends decide to buy a present for the bride and they go to the music shop, because Kolya is attracted to the saleswoman, Alyona (Galina Polskikh).

Volodya finds himself attracted to Alyona. He makes another attempt to see Voronin and Kolya invites himself along. Sasha and his fiancée Sveta have a spat over the phone. At Voronin’s home, Volodya mistakes a floor polisher for the writer and the floor polisher quickly reads Volodya’s 3-page story and criticizes it for not being true to life. The real Voronin arrives and asks Volodya to help with a literary collection by young Siberian writers. Sasha decides not to get married, cuts off his hair, and rejects the referral, but then shows up at the wedding anyway. Volodya looks for Alyona and, joined by Kolya, runs into her father, who reveals she went to a concert but gets upset about random men trying to woo his daughter. Unhappy with the meeting with Alyona’s father, Volodya lashes out at Kolya and they part.

Kolya picks up Alyona from the concert and Volodya arrives as well. Alyona refuses to go to the wedding with Kolya. Kolya pretends he has telepathy to make a man in front of them turn around. He does and sees them staring at him and rushes off. Kolya, Alyona, and Volodya happen upon a show asking for volunteers to form two teams. The team that can draw the best horse in 5 seconds wins. Kolya’s team is faster but loses due to quality. Volodya accuses a man in the audience of being a thief. The man runs off and Volodya and a large portion of the audience, including the man Kolya claimed to use telepathy on, give chase. The “telepathy victim” accuses Volodya of being the thief, and they end up in a police station where the police are completely confused and cannot understand their stories and why they are there.

Kolya enlists a passing woman to get on the phone with Alyona’s mother to vouch for her being out late at night with a female friend. Alyona, Kolya, and Volodya wind up at Sasha’s wedding reception only to find out Sasha and Sveta are splitting up because Sveta found out Sasha had cold feet earlier. Volodya dances with Alyona. Kolya watches despondently, then calls Sveta. When she refuses to pick up the phone, Kolya yells across the plaza to her building and the reception dancers below join him to get her attention. She picks up the phone. Kolya puts Sasha on and the couple make up. Alyona and Kolya see Volodya off as he returns to Siberia and then Kolya and Alyona say goodbye to each other. Kolya sings a song as he heads back to work.

== Cast ==
- Aleksei Loktev – Volodya
- Nikita Mikhalkov – Kolka
- Galina Polskikh – Alyona
- Yevgeny Steblov – Sasha
- Irina Titova – Sveta
- Irina Miroshnichenko – Katya, Kolka's sister
- Lyubov Sokolova – Kolka's mother
- Yekaterina Melnikova – Kolka's grandmother
- Arkadiy Smirnov – Aleksey Petrovich Voronov, writer
- Vladimir Basov – floor polisher
- Rolan Bykov – Man in Park
- Valentina Ananina – ice-cream vendor
- Veronika Vasilyeva – mistress of ceremonies
- Irina Skobtseva – Nadya
- Inna Churikova – girl participating in the playful contest
- Maria Vinogradova – woman with a dog
- Gennadiy Yalovich – tour guide
- Alevtina Rumiantseva – underground guard
- Vladimir Shurupov – Viktor, Kolka's brother
- Danuta Stolyarskaya – Anya, Viktor's wife
- Boris Balakin – taxi driver
- Boris Bityukov – Alyona's father
- Pyotr Dolzhanov – passerby
- Lev Durov – militsioner
- Arina Aleynikova – girl at the airport
- Igor Bogolybov – military commissar
- Vadim Shilov – underground squabbler
- Anna Pavlova – secretary at the military commissariat
- Viktor Volkov – construction foreman
- Viktor Shkurin – thief
- Uno Masaaki – Japanese man
- Svetlana Besedina – girl in the rain
- Oleg Vidov – boy on the bike
- Georgiy Daneliya – shoeshine man

== Legacy ==
This film was highly beloved by Soviet youth in the early 1960s. Though its plot may be regarded as naive and unpretentious, it portrays the wonders of life, gives hope and tries to look at the unpleasant things in an optimistic way. The song by the same name from the film is still popular and became the unofficial hymn of Moscow youth.

The popularity of this film was low in the 1970s but rose again in the 1980s in contrast to contemporaneous "chernukha" ("black stuff") films, gloomy satirical and social dramas with philosophical motifs. Nowadays it is still very famous.

There are new versions of the song by some 1990s Russian rock groups (for example, Nogu Svelo!) and also a film remake, The Heat, which was commercially successfully but critically panned.
