= Two Captains (film) =

- Russian: Два капитана
- Directed by: Vladimir Vengerov
- Written by: Yevgeni Gabrilovich; Veniamin Kaverin
- Produced by: Joseph Polyakov
- Starring: Aleksandr Mikhaylov; Olga Zabotkina; Anatoly Adoskin; Yevgeni Lebedev; Borya Belyayev
- Cinematography: Apollinari Dudko
- Edited by: Yevgenia Makhankova
- Music by: Oleg Karavaychuk
- Release date: 1955
- Running time: 98 min.
- Country: Soviet Union
- Language: Russian
- Budget: Lenfilm

Two Captains (Russian: Два капитана, romanized: Dva kapitana) is a 1955 Soviet adventure film directed by Vladimir Vengerov, based on a novel by Veniamin Kaverin.

The film tells of Alexander Grigoriev who dreams of becoming a polar pilot and finding traces of the Arctic expedition of Captain Tatarinov, which has disappeared, and he persistently goes to his goal.

== Plot ==
Sanya Grigoryev retrieves a mailbag from the river, left behind by a drowned postman. The letters inside are water-damaged, and the addresses are illegible, making the contents fascinating reading for Sanya. One letter, written by a sailor, captivates him so deeply that he memorizes it. Dreaming of adventure, Sanya runs away from home to travel the world but ends up in Petrograd, becoming a street child.

In Petrograd, Sanya is taken in by Ivan Pavlovich Korablyov, a teacher who places him in a communal school. The school is overseen by Nikolai Antonovich Tatarynov. Sanya befriends Katya Tatarynova, the daughter of the late Captain Ivan Lvovich Tatarynov, who was Nikolai’s cousin. Sanya discovers that the sailor’s letter he found belonged to Captain Ivan Lvovich. He also learns that Nikolai played a key role in the ill-fated expedition that led to the captain's demise. Upon hearing this, Maria Vasilievna, Ivan Lvovich's widow and Nikolai's wife, poisons herself. Nikolai accuses Sanya of slander and causing Maria's death. Determined to prove his innocence, Sanya vows to locate the missing expedition.

After graduating from school, Sanya becomes a polar aviator and marries Katya. When World War II begins, he joins the front. During one mission, his damaged aircraft lands him at the last known campsite of Captain Tatarynov's expedition. Sanya discovers the remains of the expedition. Later, a Soviet professor delivers a public lecture about the expedition’s discoveries, its tragic fate, and Nikolai’s culpability. Meanwhile, Sanya continues defending his country and eventually reunites with Katya, who had gone missing during the Siege of Leningrad.

== Cast ==
- Aleksandr Mikhaylov as Sanya Grigoryev
- Olga Zabotkina as Katya Tatarinova
- Anatoly Adoskin as Valya Zhukov
- Yevgeni Lebedev as Romashov
- Borya Belyayev as Sanya Grigoryev in childhood
- Bruno Freindlich as Ivan Pavlovich Korablyov
- Nina Drobysheva as Sasha, Sanya's sister
- Boris Arakelov as Romashov in childhood
- Lyudmila Makarova as Katya's girlfriend
- Lidiya Fedoseyeva-Shukshina as Valya Zhukov's assistant

== Release ==
Vladimir Vengerov's film attracted 32 million viewers, which ranks 306th in the history of Soviet film distribution.
