= Paraplatyptilia metzneri =

Scientific classification
- Kingdom: Animalia
- Phylum: Arthropoda
- Class: Insecta
- Order: Lepidoptera
- Family: Pterophoridae
- Genus: Paraplatyptilia
- Species: P. metzneri

Binomial name
- Paraplatyptilia metzneri (Zeller, 1841)

Synonyms
- Pterophorus metzneri Zeller, 1841; Pterophorus bollii Frey, 1856

Species of plume moth

Paraplatyptilia metzneri is a moth of the family Pterophoridae that is found in France, Switzerland, Italy, Croatia, Bosnia and Herzegovina, North Macedonia, Serbia and Montenegro, Albania, Bulgaria, Russia, Turkey, China, Iran and Mongolia.

The larvae possibly feed on Astragalus species.
