= Paraplatyptilia lutescens =

Scientific classification
- Kingdom: Animalia
- Phylum: Arthropoda
- Class: Insecta
- Order: Lepidoptera
- Family: Pterophoridae
- Genus: Paraplatyptilia
- Species: P. lutescens

Binomial name
- Paraplatyptilia lutescens (Lange, 1950)

Synonyms
- Platyptilia lutescens Lange, 1950

Species of plume moth

Paraplatyptilia lutescens is a moth of the family Pterophoridae that is found in North America, including California.
