= Yershov (surname) =

Yershov, also Ershov (Russian: Ершов; masculine), or Yershova, Ershova (feminine) is a Russian patronymic surname derived from the nickname (Yorsh, ёрш) ruffe (a type of fish). A transliteration into German language is Erschoff. It is associated with the old Russian noble Yershov families. The surname may be derived from the nickname for a prickly, stubborn, or quarrelsome person. In some cases it may be derived from the rare animalistic given name Yorsh.

Notable people with the name include:

== Ershov/Yershov ==
- Andrey Yershov (1931–1988), Soviet computer scientist
- Artur Ershov (born 1990), Russian racing cyclist
- Dmitry Yershov (born 1971), Russian short track speed skater
- Ivan Yershov (1867–1943), PAU, Soviet and Russian opera singer
- Ivan Yershov (footballer), Russian footballer
- Mikhail Yershov (footballer) (born 1986), Russian footballer
- Nikita Yershov (born 2002), Russian football player
- Nikolay Ershov or Nikolay Grigoryevich Erschoff (1837–1896), Russian entomologist
- Pyotr Mikhaylovich Yershov (1910–1994), Russian theater director and art theoretician
- Pyotr Pavlovich Yershov (1815–1869), Russian poet
- Vadim Ershov (born 1973), Russian serial killer
- Vasily Yershov (1672 – after 1729), governor and vice governor of Moscow
- Victor Ershov (born 1958), Russian wheelchair curler
- Yury Yershov (born 1940), Russian mathematician

== Ershova/Yershova ==
- Galina Yershova (born 1955), Russian academic historian, epigrapher, and Mayanist scholar
- Nataliya Yershova (born 1955), Russian backstroke swimmer
- Svetlana Ershova (born 1994), Russian weightlifter
- Zinaida Yershova (1904–1995), Soviet and Russian chemist, physicist and engineer

== See also ==
- Yershov (disambiguation)
