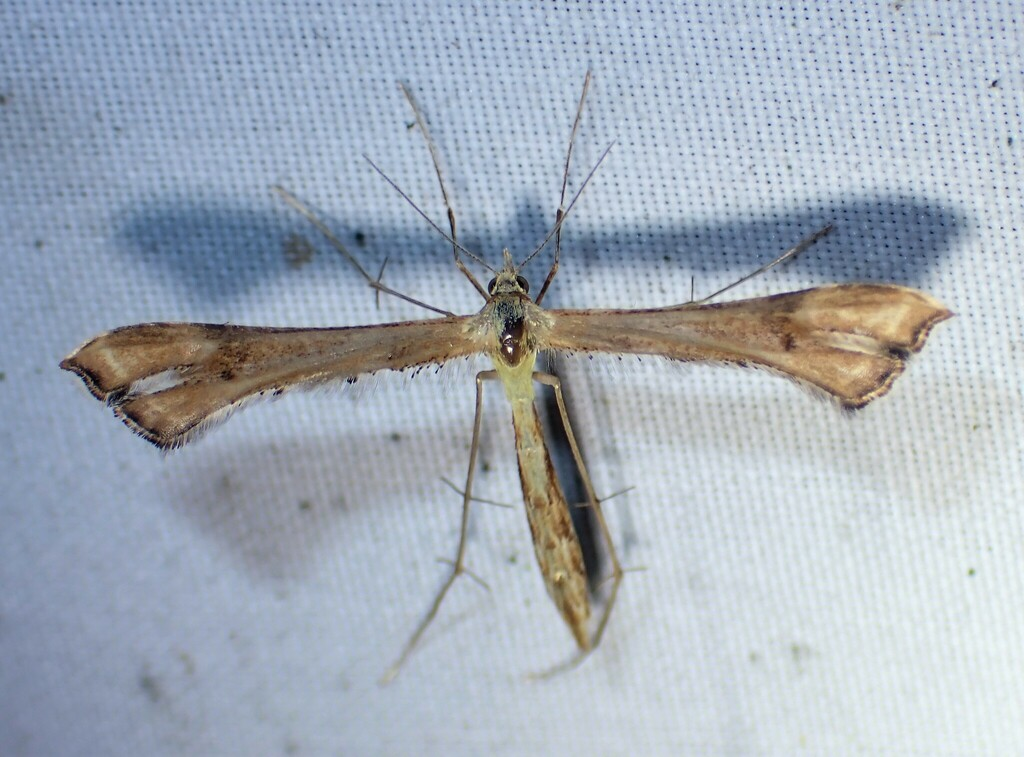

Scientific classification
- Kingdom: Animalia
- Phylum: Arthropoda
- Class: Insecta
- Order: Lepidoptera
- Family: Pterophoridae
- Genus: Paraplatyptilia
- Species: P. carolina

Binomial name
- Paraplatyptilia carolina (Kearfott, 1907)

Synonyms
- Platyptilia carolina Kearfott, 1907; Stenoptilodes carolina

= Paraplatyptilia carolina =

Species of plume moth

Paraplatyptilia carolina is a moth of the family Pterophoridae described by William D. Kearfott in 1907. It is found in the southeastern United States, including Florida, southern Mississippi, North Carolina and Georgia.

The wingspan is about 20–25 millimetres (0.79–0.98 in). The head, palpi, thorax and forewings are clay yellow. The forewing is minutely dotted with a darker shade and the costa from inner third to outer fourth is dusted with blackish scales. There is a dark brown dot below the costa and another on the lower lobe just within and below the inner end of the cleft. There is a similar spot on the apex of the second lobe. The hindwings are the same color as the forewings but with a faint pinkish tinge, with brownish lines before the cilia and a tiny black dot near the outer end of the cilia of the third lobe. The body is shaded with brown posteriorly and on the sides, with a few whitish scales in the lateral tufts. The legs are bleached straw color, dusted with brown.
