= Paraplatyptilia maea =

Scientific classification
- Kingdom: Animalia
- Phylum: Arthropoda
- Class: Insecta
- Order: Lepidoptera
- Family: Pterophoridae
- Genus: Paraplatyptilia
- Species: P. maea

Binomial name
- Paraplatyptilia maea (Barnes & Lindsey, 1921)

Synonyms
- Platyptilia maea Barnes & Lindsey, 1921

Species of plume moth

Paraplatyptilia maea is a moth of the family Pterophoridae that is found in North America, including California, Utah, Colorado, Oregon and Alberta.

The wingspan is 19–25 millimetres (0.75–0.98 in). The head and body are grayish white with some brown scales. The abdomen has dark subdorsal lines just beyond the middle and similar lines below. The antennae are brown dotted above. There is a dark dot before the cleft on the forewings and a costal shade above, vaguely connected by a brownish-gray shade which runs back along the costa. On the costa it is always followed by a whitish dash which may extend further across the wing as a pale shade. The fringes are gray with white the bases containing dark basal scales. The hindwings are more brownish with fringes of the same color.
