= Paraplatyptilia albidorsellus =

Scientific classification
- Kingdom: Animalia
- Phylum: Arthropoda
- Class: Insecta
- Order: Lepidoptera
- Family: Pterophoridae
- Genus: Paraplatyptilia
- Species: P. albidorsellus

Binomial name
- Paraplatyptilia albidorsellus (Walsingham, 1880)

Synonyms
- Platyptilus albidorsellus Walsingham, 1880; Paraplatyptilia albidorsella; Platyptilus albidorsella

Species of plume moth

Paraplatyptilia albidorsellus is a moth of the family Pterophoridae. It is found in North America (including California, Alberta and British Columbia).

The wingspan is about 30 millimetres (1.2 in). The head and thorax are white, with a few scattered fuscous scales. The legs are whitish tinged with cinereous and the feet and spurs are paler. The forewings are white, thickly sprinkled with brown, forming a widening streak from the base of the wing to the triangular patch, beyond which it is paler and crossed by a white costal patch and a white line near the outer margin and parallel to it. The fringes are ashy, with a brown line at the base. The hindwings are white, thickly dusted with brown. The fringes are paler brown and much paler at the base.
