= Paraplatyptilia glacialis =

Scientific classification
- Kingdom: Animalia
- Phylum: Arthropoda
- Class: Insecta
- Order: Lepidoptera
- Family: Pterophoridae
- Genus: Paraplatyptilia
- Species: P. glacialis

Binomial name
- Paraplatyptilia glacialis Gielis, 2008

Species of plume moth

Paraplatyptilia glacialis is a moth of the family Pterophoridae. It is found in North America, including the type location St. Mary in Glacier County, Montana.
