= Raisa Ryazanova =

Soviet and Russian actress

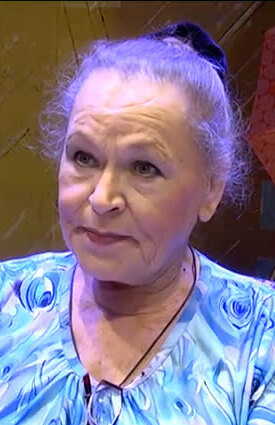
- Ryazanova in 2016
- Born: Raisa Ivanovna Ryazanova; October 31, 1944 (age 81); Petropavlosk, Kazakh SSR, USSR
- Occupation: actress
- Years active: 1967–present

Raisa Ivanovna Ryazanova (Russian: Раиса Ивановна Рязанова; born 31 October 1944) is a Soviet and Russian theater and film actress. She has performed in more than sixty films since 1969. She won the State Prize of the USSR (1981) and was the People's Artist of Russia in 2005.

== Selected filmography ==
Film
Year	Title	Role	Notes
1980	Moscow Does Not Believe in Tears	Antonina Buyanova	
1977	White Bim Black Ear	mother	
1974	Teens in the Universe	Okorokova	
1973	Moscow-Cassiopeia	Okorokova	
1995	The Aristocratic Peasant Girl	Anisya Egorovna	
2005	Not Born Beautiful	Olga Uyutova	
2006	Rush Hour	Antonina Arkhipova	
2013	The Excursionist	Grandma Nadya	
2013	One Particular Pioneer	Galina Ivanovna	
