= Paraplatyptilia nana =

Scientific classification
- Kingdom: Animalia
- Phylum: Arthropoda
- Class: Insecta
- Order: Lepidoptera
- Family: Pterophoridae
- Genus: Paraplatyptilia
- Species: P. nana

Binomial name
- Paraplatyptilia nana (McDunnough, 1927)

Synonyms
- Platyptilia nana McDunnough, 1927

Species of plume moth

Paraplatyptilia nana is a moth of the family Pterophoridae first described by James Halliday McDunnough in 1927. It is found in North America, including British Columbia and Alberta.
