= On Thursday and Never Again =

- Russian: В четверг и больше никогда
- Directed by: Anatoly Efros
- Written by: Andrei Bitov
- Starring: Lyubov Dobrzhanskaya; Oleg Dal; Innokenty Smoktunovsky; Vera Glagoleva
- Cinematography: Vladimir Chukhnov
- Edited by: Antonina Burmistrova
- Music by: Dmitri Shostakovich
- Release date: 1977
- Country: Soviet Union
- Language: Russian

On Thursday and Never Again (Russian: В четверг и больше никогда) is a 1977 Soviet romantic drama film directed by Anatoly Efros.

The film tells about a doctor who, before his wedding, wants to visit his mother, who lives in the province, but wants to do it without a bride, because his ex-girlfriend Varia lives there and expects a child from him.

== Plot ==
Sergey, a successful Moscow doctor recently in a common-law marriage, returns to his rural hometown in a nature reserve. Ostensibly, he's visiting his mother and stepfather after many years, but the real reason is a telegram from a young woman, Varya, who lives nearby and is expecting his child. While Sergey arrives with the intent of resolving the situation with Varya’s pregnancy, he is unsure how to proceed. He feels a sense of responsibility but is unwilling to leave his glamorous wife, a singer, to be with Varya, despite her love for him.

In a fit of impulse, Sergey shoots a tame deer his mother had nursed, violating the reserve’s strict hunting ban. This act deeply troubles his mother, Ekaterina Andreyevna, who scolds him for his cruelty and attempts to discuss Varya’s pregnancy with him, but they grow even more distant. Ekaterina’s distress worsens when Sergey reacts nonchalantly to her fears that Varya might resort to suicide. Heartbroken, she wanders into the forest, where she collapses. Varya finds her and rushes to call Sergey, but he arrives too late to help. Thus, Sergey’s day in his homeland ends in tragedy. In the final scene, Sergey stands alone on the balcony of his Moscow apartment.

== Cast ==
- Lyubov Dobrzhanskaya as Yekaterina Andreyevna
- Oleg Dal as Sergey
- Innokenty Smoktunovsky as Ivan Modestovich
- Vera Glagoleva as Varya
- Aleksandr Ozhigin as Direktor
- Mikhail Zhigalov as Yegor
- Vladimir Plotnikov
- Viktor Karlov as Kharitonov
- Grazina Baikstyte as Grazhina (as Grazhina Baykshtite)
- Marina Korotkova
- Irina Korotkova
