= Yershova, Irkutsk Oblast =

Yershova Ершова
- Village
- Location within Irkutsk Oblast Location within Russia
- Coordinates: 53°20′N 103°32′E
- Country: Russia
- Region: Irkutsk Oblast
- District: Bokhansky District
- Time zone: UTC+8:00

Yershova (Russian: Ершова) is a rural locality (a village) in Bokhansky District, Irkutsk Oblast, Russia. Population: 71 (2010 census);

== Geography ==
This rural locality is located 26 kilometres (16 mi) from Bokhan (the district's administrative centre), 127 kilometres (79 mi) from Irkutsk (capital of Irkutsk Oblast) and 4,385 kilometres (2,725 mi) from Moscow. Kryukova is the nearest rural locality.
