= Paraplatyptilia vacillans =

Scientific classification
- Kingdom: Animalia
- Phylum: Arthropoda
- Class: Insecta
- Order: Lepidoptera
- Family: Pterophoridae
- Genus: Paraplatyptilia
- Species: P. vacillans

Binomial name
- Paraplatyptilia vacillans (Snellen, 1884)

Synonyms
- Pterophorus vacillans Snellen, 1884

Species of plume moth

Paraplatyptilia vacillans is a moth of the family Pterophoridae that is found in Russia (Amur region).

The wingspan is 19–21 millimetres (0.75–0.83 in).
