= Seven Old Men and a Girl =

- Directed by: Yevgeny Karelov
- Written by: Yevgeny Karelov; Albert Ivanov
- Starring: Svetlana Savyolova; Valentin Smirnitsky; Boris Chirkov; Nikolay Parfyonov; Boris Novikov; Aleksei Smirnov; Anatoly Adoskin; Alexander Beniaminov
- Cinematography: Sergei Zaitsev
- Music by: Evgeniy Ptichkin
- Production companies: Mosfilm; Creative Group "Telefilm"
- Release date: 1968
- Running time: 78 minutes
- Country: Soviet Union
- Language: Russian

Seven Old Men and a Girl (Russian: Семь стариков и одна девушка, romanized: Sem starikov i odna devushka) is a 1968 Soviet musical comedy film directed by Yevgeny Karelov.

== Plot ==
Elena Velichko — a young graduate of the sports institute, is sent to work as a coach in a sports club. She is full of bright hopes. However, instead of promising athletes, she is given a "health team" - six not very young men, who are neither healthy nor complaisant.

Elena tries in every possible way to get rid of her charges. She gives them some ridiculously light, sometimes overwhelming burdens, screams and is verbally rude, she tries to get herself fired, but this proves to be difficult: according to Soviet legislation, a young specialist can only be dismissed for a very serious offense.

Soon, a seventh student, Volodya Tyupin, joins the group of six "old men". He likes Elena and he wants her affection. Volodya in every possible way tries to help the girl realize her plan: to the best of his abilities, he breaks up the group from within and discredits the coach. But in fact, everything turns out the other way round: the "old people" become sincerely sympathetic for their instructor and try their best to be successful.

In the finals, all seven fall into an extreme situation (a collector is robbed before their eyes) and it turns out that Elena's classes were not in vain - the "old people" have become not only physically strengthened, but have also united in a friendly team.

== Cast ==
- Svetlana Savyolova as Elena Velichko, the new coach
- Valentin Smirnitsky as Vladimir Tyupin, correspondence student
- Boris Chirkov as Vladimir Nikolaevich Yakovlev, a big boss
- Nikolay Parfyonov as Sukhov, not so big boss
- Boris Novikov as Stepan Petrovich Bubnov, plumber
- Aleksei Smirnov as Maslennikov, opera singer
- Anatoly Adoskin as Anatoly Sidorov, hopeless bachelor
- Alexander Beniaminov as Sergey Sergeevich Anisov, the collector
- Yevgeny Vesnik as director of sports club
- Georgy Vitsin as robber №1
- Yuri Nikulin as robber №2
- Yevgeny Morgunov as robber №3
- Anatoli Papanov as Legal Adviser
- Nina Agapova as Kravtsova, the doctor
- Georgi Tusuzov as Murashko, Professor
- Tatyana Bestayeva as Jeanette, Frenchwoman, bride of Anatoly Sidorov
- Pyotr Savin as head of Anisov
- Anatoly Obukhov as Grisha, the Thug
- Emma Treyvas as barmaid
