= Paraplatyptilia cooleyi =

Scientific classification
- Kingdom: Animalia
- Phylum: Arthropoda
- Class: Insecta
- Order: Lepidoptera
- Family: Pterophoridae
- Genus: Paraplatyptilia
- Species: P. cooleyi

Binomial name
- Paraplatyptilia cooleyi (Fernald, 1898)

Synonyms
- Platyptilia cooleyi Fernald, 1898

Species of plume moth

Paraplatyptilia cooleyi is a moth of the family Pterophoridae. It is found in North America (including Colorado and California).

The wingspan is 21–27 millimetres (0.83–1.06 in). The head, thorax and forewings are yellowish brown. There is a darker brown spot on the middle of the cell and two of the same color (one above the other) just before the end of the cleft, the upper one being absent in some specimens, while in others they are joined, forming a dark-brown dash across the end of the cell. There is also a subterminal whitish stripe on the first lobe. The fringes are whitish, with a sub-basal line concolorous with the wing. The hindwings and fringes are a little darker than the forewings.

== Etymology ==
The species is named for Mr. R. A. Cooley.
