= Paraplatyptilia edwardsii =

Scientific classification
- Kingdom: Animalia
- Phylum: Arthropoda
- Class: Insecta
- Order: Lepidoptera
- Family: Pterophoridae
- Genus: Paraplatyptilia
- Species: P. edwardsii

Binomial name
- Paraplatyptilia edwardsii (Fish, 1881)

Synonyms
- Platyptilus edwardsi Fish, 1881; Paraplatyptilia edwardsi; Platyptilia edwardsii

Species of plume moth

Paraplatyptilia edwardsii is a moth of the family Pterophoridae. It is found in North America (including Maine, Massachusetts and eastern Canada).

The wingspan is 22–27 mm. The head and thorax are ochreous brown. The abdomen is ochreous and slender and the legs are ochreous brown. The forewings are reddish brown, but darker on the costa. There is a dark brown triangular costal spot, bordered on the outside by whitish scales. A small brown spot occurs near the hind margin at the basal fourth, another near the costa at the basal third, and a transverse white line at the apical third of the lobe. The fringes are whitish, with a patch of dark scales before and another just behind the apex of the costal triangle. The hind wings are reddish brown and the fringes brown, but whitish at the base of the hind margin. There is a small patch of dark scales just before the apex.
