= Paraplatyptilia atlantica =

Scientific classification
- Kingdom: Animalia
- Phylum: Arthropoda
- Clade: Pancrustacea
- Class: Insecta
- Order: Lepidoptera
- Family: Pterophoridae
- Genus: Paraplatyptilia
- Species: P. atlantica

Binomial name
- Paraplatyptilia atlantica B. Landry & Gielis, 2008

Species of plume moth

Paraplatyptilia atlantica is a moth of the family Pterophoridae. It is known from Eastern Canada in Newfoundland and Quebec.

The wingspan is about 20 millimetres (0.79 in). Adults are on wing in July and August and at up to about 1,100 metres (3,600 ft) on Mount Albert. The host plant is unknown.
