= Paraplatyptilia terskeyiensis =

Scientific classification
- Kingdom: Animalia
- Phylum: Arthropoda
- Clade: Pancrustacea
- Class: Insecta
- Order: Lepidoptera
- Family: Pterophoridae
- Genus: Paraplatyptilia
- Species: P. terskeyiensis

Binomial name
- Paraplatyptilia terskeyiensis Gibeaux, 1997

Species of plume moth

Paraplatyptilia terskeyiensis is a moth of the family Pterophoridae.
