= Paraplatyptilia albiciliatus =

Scientific classification
- Kingdom: Animalia
- Phylum: Arthropoda
- Class: Insecta
- Order: Lepidoptera
- Family: Pterophoridae
- Genus: Paraplatyptilia
- Species: P. albiciliatus

Binomial name
- Paraplatyptilia albiciliatus (Walsingham, 1880)

Synonyms
- Platyptilus albiciliatus Walsingham, 1880; Platyptilia canadensis McDunnough, 1927; Platyptilia rubricans Lange, 1950; Platyptilus orthocarpi Walsingham, 1880; Platyptilia orthocarpi

Species of plume moth

Paraplatyptilia albiciliatus is a moth of the family Pterophoridae. It is found in North America (including California, Oregon, Alberta and British Columbia).

The larvae have been recorded feeding on Orthocarpus species.
