= Paraplatyptilia albidus =

Scientific classification
- Kingdom: Animalia
- Phylum: Arthropoda
- Class: Insecta
- Order: Lepidoptera
- Family: Pterophoridae
- Genus: Paraplatyptilia
- Species: P. albidus

Binomial name
- Paraplatyptilia albidus (Walsingham, 1880)

Synonyms
- Platyptilus albidus Walsingham, 1880; Platyptilia albida; Stenoptilodes albida; Stenoptilodes albidus

Species of plume moth

Paraplatyptilia albidus is a moth which belongs to the family Pterophoridae. It is found in North America (including California, Oregon and British Columbia).

The wingspan is about 24 millimetres (0.94 in). The head and thorax are white, with a bluish tinge. The antennae are white and dotted with brown above. The abdomen is white streaked with fuscous and the hind legs are dark ashy. The spurs and feet are slightly paler on the inner side. The forewings are bluish white, with brownish scales, especially along the costa to the brown triangular spot, beyond which is a pale stripe running parallel to the outer margin across both lobes of the wing. There is another pale line near the outer margin. The space between these pale lines is greyish-brown except near the costa, where it is brownish. There is a brown stripe between this and the fringes. Two indistinct brown spots are located on the inner half of the wing, the lower spot much nearer the base than the upper one. There is a brown line at the base of the fringe, which is white except at the anal angle. The hindwings are brown, as are the fringes, although they are a little paler on the hind margin of the third feather.
