= Paraplatyptilia baueri =

Scientific classification
- Kingdom: Animalia
- Phylum: Arthropoda
- Clade: Pancrustacea
- Class: Insecta
- Order: Lepidoptera
- Family: Pterophoridae
- Genus: Paraplatyptilia
- Species: P. baueri

Binomial name
- Paraplatyptilia baueri (Lange, 1950)

Synonyms
- Platyptilia baueri Lange, 1950

Species of plume moth

Paraplatyptilia baueri is a moth of the family Pterophoridae. It is found in North America, including California.
