= Paraplatyptilia modesta =

Scientific classification
- Kingdom: Animalia
- Phylum: Arthropoda
- Class: Insecta
- Order: Lepidoptera
- Family: Pterophoridae
- Genus: Paraplatyptilia
- Species: P. modesta

Binomial name
- Paraplatyptilia modesta (Walsingham, 1880)

Synonyms
- Platyptilus modesta Walsingham, 1880; Paraplatyptilia modestus

Species of plume moth

Paraplatyptilia modesta is a moth of the family Pterophoridae. It is found in North America (including California and Alberta).

The wingspan is about 22 millimetres (0.87 in). The head and palpi are cinereous and the antennae are slightly dotted above. The forewings are very narrow and cinereous, with a slight ochreous tinge towards the dorsal margin. The costa is sprinkled and shaded with fuscous, the fuscous shade widening towards the fissure, forming an elongate but indistinct triangular costal blotch. The apical portion of the wing is more or less shaded with fuscous, and a fuscous line is found along the base of the cilia on the apical margin, which are whitish at their points. The cilia within the fissure and those along the dorsal margin before the anal angle are white, the latter containing a few dark scales. The hindwings are cinereous, although the cilia are slightly paler, especially along their bases. The posterior legs are cinereous and the feet slightly paler.
