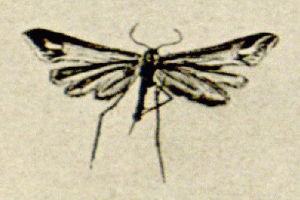

Scientific classification
- Kingdom: Animalia
- Phylum: Arthropoda
- Class: Insecta
- Order: Lepidoptera
- Family: Pterophoridae
- Genus: Paraplatyptilia
- Species: P. sahlbergi

Binomial name
- Paraplatyptilia sahlbergi (Poppius, 1906)

Synonyms
- Stenoptilia sahlbergi Poppius, 1906

= Paraplatyptilia sahlbergi =

Species of plume moth

Paraplatyptilia sahlbergi is a moth of the family Pterophoridae that is found in Russia (the South Siberian Mountains) and China.

The wingspan is about 25 millimetres (0.98 in). The forewings are greyish-white and the hindwings are grey.
