= Paraplatyptilia sabourini =

Scientific classification
- Kingdom: Animalia
- Phylum: Arthropoda
- Class: Insecta
- Order: Lepidoptera
- Family: Pterophoridae
- Genus: Paraplatyptilia
- Species: P. sabourini

Binomial name
- Paraplatyptilia sabourini Gielis, 2008

Species of moth

Paraplatyptilia sabourini is a moth of the family Pterophoridae that is found in North America, including the type location Burnett County, Wisconsin.
