= Agapetus (deacon) =

6th-century Byzantine clergyman

Agapetus (Ancient Greek: Ἀγαπητός) was a deacon of the church of Hagia Sophia at Constantinople (about 500). He was a reputed tutor of Justinian, and author of a series of exhortations in seventy-two short chapters addressed around 527 to Justinian (Patrologia Graecae, LXXXVI, 1153–86).

== Sources ==
The first letters of each chapter form an acrostic of dedication that reads: "The very humble Deacon Agapetus to the sacred and venerable Emperor Justinian" (ἔκθεσις κεφαλαίων παραινετικῶν σχεδιασθεῖσα). The repute in which this work was held appears from its common title, viz. the Royal Sections (σχέδη βασιλικὰ). The book deals in general terms with the moral, religious, and political duties of a ruler. In form it is quite sententious and rhetorical, and resembles closely a similar work in the romance of Barlaam and Josaphat. Both of these seem to be based on Isocrates, and on Basil the Great and Gregory of Nazianzus.

The work of Agapetus was eminently fitted for the use of medieval teachers by reason of its content, the purity of its Greek diction, and its skillful construction. It was widely current in Russia providing the formulations of monarchical ideology. It was translated into Latin, French and German and was highly commended by the humanists of the Renaissance. Some twenty editions of it appeared in the sixteenth century.
