= Yershova, Perm Krai =

Yershova Ершова
- Village
- Location within Perm Krai Location within Russia
- Coordinates: 58°42′N 54°37′E
- Country: Russia
- Region: Perm Krai
- District: Kudymkarsky District
- Time zone: UTC+5:00

Yershova (Russian: Ершова) is a rural locality (a village) in Leninskoye Rural Settlement, Kudymkarsky District, Perm Krai, Russia. The population was 7 as of 2010.

== Geography ==
Yershova is located 40 km south of Kudymkar (the district's administrative centre) by road. Gavrilova is the nearest rural locality.
