= Agapetus (physician) =

Ancient Greek physician

Agapetus (Ancient Greek: Ἀγαπητός) was an ancient Greek physician, whose remedy for the gout is mentioned with approbation by Alexander of Tralles and Paul of Aegina. He probably lived between the third and sixth centuries AD, or certainly not later, as Alexander of Tralles, by whom he is quoted, is supposed to have flourished about the beginning of the sixth century.
