= Kryukova, Irkutsk Oblast =

Kryukova Крюкова
- Village
- Location within Irkutsk Oblast Location within Russia
- Coordinates: 53°19′N 103°31′E
- Country: Russia
- Region: Irkutsk Oblast
- District: Bokhansky District
- Time zone: UTC+8:00

Kryukova (Russian: Крюкова) is a rural locality (a village) in Bokhansky District, Irkutsk Oblast, Russia. Population: 134 (2010 census);

== Geography ==
This rural locality is located 25 kilometres (16 mi) from Bokhan (the district's administrative centre), 125 kilometres (78 mi) from Irkutsk (capital of Irkutsk Oblast) and 4,386 kilometres (2,725 mi) from Moscow. Yershova is the nearest rural locality.
