= Svetlana Savyolova =

- Born: 7 January 1942; Simferopol, Soviet Union
- Died: 30 January 1999 (aged 57); Moscow, Russia
- Occupations: Film and stage actress
- Years active: 1960-1969
- Spouse: Gennadiy Baysak (divorced)

Svetlana Ivanovna Savyolova (Russian: Светлана Ивановна Савёлова, 7 January 1942 – 30 January 1999) was a Soviet Russian film and stage actress. Savyolova starred in seven films and then acted on stage. For her look Savyolova was sometimes called "the Russian Brigitte Bardot".

== Early life ==
Savyolova was born in the city of Simferopol, then part of the Crimean Autonomous Soviet Socialist Republic which was in the grip of World War II at the time. Having finished school, Savyolova initially planned a medical career. She started to work in a Sevastopol drugstore. In her student years, Savyolova was briefly married to film director Gennadiy Baysak, but the marriage fell apart.

== Films ==
Savyolova was discovered by film director Yakov Segel, who was searching for an actress in his film Farewell, Doves. Having a headache, Segel visited a drugstore in Sevastopol where Savyolova was working. Segel decided it was Savyolova he was searching for and gave her the lead role of nurse Tanya in A Farewell to Doves, which became Savyolova's breakthrough. She decided to postpone the medical career and continued acting. In 1968, Savyolova played the lead role of Lena Velichko in the Soviet comedy Seven Old Men and a Girl. Savyolova was chosen over other candidates, such as Natalya Seleznyova and Lyudmila Gladunko.

In her career, Savyolova starred in seven Soviet films: Farewell, Doves (1960), Listen! (1963), Small Green Light (1964), The Last Swindler (1966), A Day of Sun and Rain (1967), Seven Old Men and a Girl (1968) and Throughout Rus (1968). Throughout Rus became Savyolova's last film, after which she was no longer offered any film roles.

== Stage and last years ==
In 1965 Savyolova graduated from Boris Shchukin Theatre Institute and started to act first in the Vakhtangov Theatre, then in the Lenkom Theatre. As a stage actress, Savyolova achieved her peak after Mark Zakharov had come to the Lenkom Theatre. Zakharov found a common language with Savyolova and gave her prominent roles. From the 1980s, however, Savyolova started to receive fewer roles. In the Lenkom Theatre, Savyolova had several unsuccessful romances. Eventually she became impoverished and sold her apartments to live elsewhere. In January 1999, Savyolova was found dead in her Moscow flat at the age of 57. The investigation into the cause of death was not performed, as Savyolova left no relatives who could have requested such an investigation. Savyolova was buried at the Nikolo-Arkhangelsk Cemetery in Moscow.
