= Moscow-Cassiopeia =

- Directed by: Richard Viktorov
- Written by: Isai Kuznetsov; Avenir Zak
- Starring: Innokenty Smoktunovsky; Vasili Merkuryev; Lev Durov
- Cinematography: Andrei Kirillov
- Edited by: Olga Katusheva
- Music by: Vladimir Chernyshev
- Distributed by: Gorky Film Studio
- Release date: 1974
- Running time: 85 minutes
- Country: Soviet Union

Moscow-Cassiopeia (Russian: Москва — Кассиопея, romanized: Moskva-Kassiopeya) is a Soviet science fiction film directed by Richard Viktorov based on a script by Isai Kuznetsov and Avenir Zak. Followed by Teens in the Universe (second part, 1975).

The film was released in the Soviet cinema on September 23, 1974. Then it was released at the box office in Poland, Germany, Yugoslavia, and Czechoslovakia. The film was first shown on TV on November 7, 1976.

== Plot ==
In the opening scene, a man in a suit and tie leans over a model of the Moon, with the “Sea of Moscow” clearly visible. He introduces himself as “The Acting Officer of Special Responsibilities” (A.O.O.). Meanwhile, in an auditorium filled with young pioneers in red neckties, Viktor Sereda presents a plan for a space journey to the star Alpha Cassiopeia on a spaceship called Zarya. (Note: ZARYa, ЗАРЯ, acronym literlly menas for Russian: Звездолёт Аннигиляционный Релятивистский Ядерный, "Relativistic Annihilation Nuclear Starship", the word literally means "dawn") This target was chosen due to mysterious signals received from that sector of the galaxy. Although the academic commission is impressed by the proposal, they express concern over the 26-year travel time each way. Viktor suggests that they send minors on the mission, as they would still be in their forties by the time they arrived. He later receives an anonymous note asking, “Would you go on a lifelong journey?” signed, “I would go with him.” After Viktor’s presentation, young pioneer Varvara Kuteyshchikova argues that instead of seeking habitable planets, humanity should focus on preserving endangered species. A boy named Fedka Lobanov chimes in with an idea for a water-powered engine. Intrigued by the note, Viktor tries to discover who sent it, but without success.

The next morning, Pasha Kozelkov hears on the radio that only those under 14 can apply to the mission’s crew. Along with Viktor, Pasha rushes from their hometown of Kaluga to Moscow, only to learn that applications have closed. Determined, they approach academician Sergey Sergeevich Filatov. At that moment, the A.O.O. appears, touching Viktor’s shoulder to ensure his health is fit for space travel. The friends then find themselves at the Academy of Sciences, where the academics are awed by Viktor’s knowledge of antimatter and invite him to join their discussion. The crew is assembled with three boys and three girls, including Katya Panferova, a budding archaeologist who has feelings for Misha Kopanygin, a boy with a phenomenal memory. Filatov leads a group of foreign journalists on a tour of the Zarya, showing them the command section, common areas, bio-center, and a "sense-catcher" for potential alien communication. Fedka Lobanov sneaks aboard just before departure. The young crew appears on the front page of Komsomolskaya Pravda, and they travel to Red Square to salute Lenin’s Mausoleum. As Zarya launches, the crew discovers the stowaway Lobanov onboard. After some tension, he ends up accidentally jettisoned into space, but is rescued. In the medical room, Lobanov accidentally activates systems that push Zarya to exceed the speed of light.

The ship's computer is unable to determine the cause, but Viktor realizes they are miraculously unharmed and begins to decelerate. A transmission from a much-older Filatov reveals that 27 years have passed on Earth. He speculates that they may have entered a tachyon spiral or subspace. Next, the crew sees their former classmate Milka Okorokova, now a grown radio astronomer, who reveals that she sent Viktor the mysterious note years ago. She is now married with two children, and confirms that distress signals are still coming from Alpha Cassiopeia. Lobanov regrets his rash decisions and expresses a desire to return to Earth, but Viktor explains that this is no longer possible, and Lobanov is accepted as the seventh crew member of the mission.

== Cast ==
- Innokenty Smoktunovsky as S.S.E. (Special Service Executive)
- Vasili Merkuryev as academician Blagovidov
- Lev Durov as academician Filatov
- Yuri Medvedev as academician Ogon-Duganovsky
- Pyotr Merkuryev as academician Kurochkin

=== Spaceship ZARYa crew ===
- Mikhail Yershov as Victor Sereda, spaceship commander
- Aleksandr Grigoryev as Pavel Kozelkov
- Vladimir Savin as Mikhail Kopanygin
- Vladimir Basov Jr. as Feodor Lobanov
- Olga Bityukova as Varvara Kuteishchikova
- Nadezhda Ovcharova as Yulia Sorokina
- Irina Popova as Katya Panfyorova

=== Other cast ===
- Anatoly Adoskin
- Natalya Fateyeva
- Nikolai Figurovsky
- Artyom Karapetyan
- Valentina Kutsenko
- Sergei Radchenko
- Raisa Ryazanova
- Nadezhda Semyontsova
- Natalya Strizhenova
- Anna Viktorova
- Nikolai Viktorov
- Mikhail Yanushkevich

== Filming ==
Initially, there was a single script, without dividing into two films, but when the amount of footage exceeded the standard timekeeping of a Soviet film, permission was obtained from the Goskino USSR to shoot two: "Moscow—Cassiopeia" and "Teens in the Universe". This did not affect the filming schedule, and as a result in the second film in some episodes the characters look younger than in the first one. Cosmonaut Georgy Beregovoy was a consultant for the film.

The costumes for the heroes were made of metallized nylon, high boots were equipped with magnetic suction cups, and the astronauts had a "sense collector" on their chests that translated from any language of the Universe.

The weightlessness scene was shot in 4 stages with the participation of Valery Pavlotos, a design engineer at the Yalta Film Studio. The movements of each actor along their own trajectory made a strong impression on the jury of the X "UNIATEC" International competition.

== Awards ==
- Prize for the Best Film for Kids of the All-Union Film Festival, Baku, 1974
- Special Prize of the International Trieste Science+Fiction Festival, Trieste, 1975
- Special Prize of the Moscow International Film Festival (in the Children's films category), Moscow, 1975
- Platero Prize of the International Film Festival of Children's and Youth Films, Gijón, 1975.
- Diploma of the Technical Contest of the Films at the UNESCO UNIATEC congress, Moscow, 1976
- Vasilyev Brothers State Prize of the RSFSR, 1977.
