= Yevgeny Steblov =

Soviet and Russian actor

- Евгений Стеблов
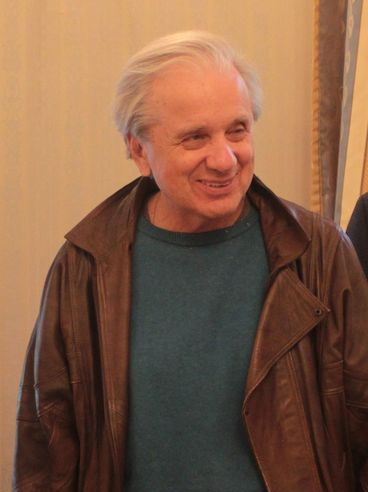
- Steblov in 2015
- Born: Yevgeny Yurievich Steblov; December 8, 1945 (age 80); Moscow, USSR
- Occupations: actor theatre teacher
- Years active: 1963–presents

Yevgeny Yurievich Steblov (Russian: Евге́ний Ю́рьевич Стебло́в; born December 8, 1945) is a Soviet and Russian film and theater actor, honored as a People's Artist of Russia in 1993. He serves as First Deputy Chairman of the Union of Theatre Workers of the Russian Federation.

== Biography ==
Yevgeny Steblov was born in 1945 in Moscow. His father, Yuri Steblov (1924-2000) was a radio engineer, and his mother, Martha (born 1924), was a teacher. His uncle, Viktor Steblov, is a known Moscow bibliophile and manager of a bookstore.

Yevgeny Steblov graduated from the Boris Shchukin Theatre Institute. In his first big movie role, he played Sasha Shatalov in the Georgiy Daneliya film Walking the Streets of Moscow (1963).

== Selected filmography ==
- 1963 — Walking the Streets of Moscow as Sasha Shatalov
- 1964 — Goodbye, Boys as Volodya
- 1968 — A Literature Lesson as Konstantin Mikhailovich, literature teacher
- 1971 — Yegor Bulychyov and Others as Tyatin
- 1972 — Taming of the Fire as Innokenti Bashkirtsev
- 1975 — A Slave of Love as actor Kanin
- 1980 — A Few Days from the Life of I.I. Oblomov as father
- 1981 — The Hound of the Baskervilles as Dr. Mortimer
- 1985 — Do Not Marry, Girls as Andrey, barber
- 1998 — The Barber of Siberia as Grand Duke Alexei
- 2007 — Election Day as San Sanych
- 2013 — Ku! Kin-dza-dza as salesman of mirages
