= Mikhail Yershov (footballer) =

Russian footballer (born 1986)

Personal information
- Full name: Mikhail Aleksandrovich Yershov
- Date of birth: 30 October 1986 (age 40)
- Place of birth: Odesskoe, Russian SFSR
- Height: 1.90 m (6 ft 3 in)
- Positions: Midfielder; defender

Senior career*
Years	Team	Apps	(Gls)
2006–2009	FC Sheksna Cherepovets	118	(10)
2010	FC Torpedo-ZIL Moscow	13	(0)
2011–2012	FC Tekstilshchik Ivanovo	41	(3)
2012–2013	FC Petrotrest St. Petersburg	29	(1)
2013	FC Dynamo St. Petersburg	6	(0)
2013–2015	FC Tekstilshchik Ivanovo	48	(1)
2015–2016	FC Volga-Olimpiyets Nizhny Novgorod	26	(1)
2016–2018	FC Cherepovets		
- * Club domestic league appearances and goals

Mikhail Aleksandrovich Yershov (Russian: Михаил Александрович Ершов; born 30 October 1986) is a former Russian professional football player.

== Club career ==
He played two seasons in the Russian Football National League for FC Petrotrest St. Petersburg and FC Dynamo St. Petersburg.
