= Agapetus of the Kiev Caves =

Orthodox Christian saint and doctor

Saint Agapetus of the Kiev Caves
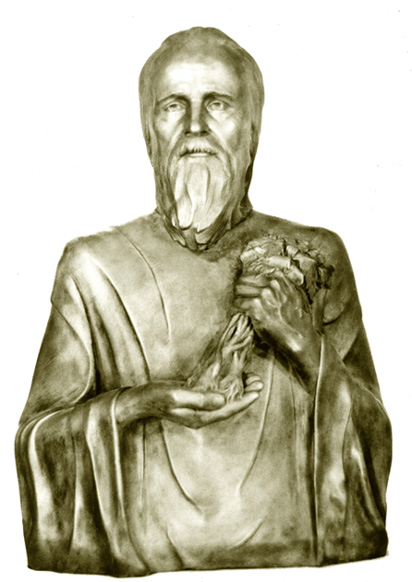
- Forensic facial reconstruction by S.A. Nikitin (1986)
- Born: Kiev
- Died: 1 June 1095
- Venerated in: Eastern Orthodox Church; Catholic Church
- Feast: 14 June (1 June by Julian calendar), 28 September

Agapetus of the Kiev Caves or Agapetus of Pechersk (Russian: Агапит Печерский; Ukrainian: Агапіт Печерський; born ?? – died 1095), was an Orthodox Christian saint and doctor, as well as a monk in Kiev Pechersk Lavra. He was born in Kiev and was taught and admitted to monastic vows by Saint Anthony of Kiev. Agapetus famously provided free medical services for poor people. He also healed grand prince Vladimir II Monomakh.

Several churches in Ukraine and Russia bear his name. His relics are stored in the Near Caves of Kiev Pechersk Lavra.

The day of Saint Agapetus of Pechersk is observed by Orthodox Churches on 14 June (1 June by Julian calendar), 28 September (commemoration of Kiev Pechersk Lavra Near Caves venerable saints), and 1 June by Catholic Christians.
