= List of Soviet films of 1972 =

A list of films produced in the Soviet Union in 1972 (see 1972 in film).

Title	Original title	Director	Cast	Genre	Notes
1972
Address of your home	Адрес вашего дома	Yevgeni Khrinyuk	Nikolai Kryuchkov, Les Serdyuk, Alexander Yanvarev, Valery Nosik	Drama	
As Ilf and Petrov rode a tram	Ехали в трамвае Ильф и Петров	Viktor Titov	Innokenty Smoktunovsky; Vladimir Basov	Comedy	
Big School-Break	Большая перемена	Aleksei Korenev	Mikhail Kononov, Aleksandr Zbruyev, Evgeni Leonov, Rolan Bykov	Comedy	
Chipollino	Чиполлино	Tamara Lisitsian	Gianni Rodari, Aleksandr Yelistratov	Musical, comedy	
Commander of the Happy "Pike"	Командир счастливой «Щуки»	Boris Volchek	Pyotr Velyaminov, Donatas Banionis	War	
Crank from 5th B	Чудак из пятого 'Б'	Ilya Frez	Andrei Voynovsky	Comedy	
Dangerous Corner	Опасный поворот	Vladimir Basov	Yury Yakovlev, Vladimir Basov, Valentina Titova, Rufina Nifontova, Antonina Shuranova	Drama	
The Dawns Here Are Quiet	А зори здесь тихие	Stanislav Rostotsky	Andrey Martynov, Yelena Drapeko, Yekaterina Markova	War drama	
Eolomea	Эоломея	Herrmann Zschoche	Cox Habbema, Ivan Andonov, Rolf Hoppe, Vsevolod Sanayev, Peter Slabakov	Science fiction	Soviet-East German co-production
Fakir hour	Факир на час	Diamara Nizhnikovskaya	Lidiya Smirnova, Alexander Belyavsky, Mikhail Pugovkin, Nadezhda Rumyantseva	Musical	
Farewell to St. Petersburg	Прощание с Петербургом	Yan Frid	Girt Yakovlev, Tatiana Bedova, Tatyana Piletskaya, Vasili Merkuryev, Pavel Kadochnikov	Biopic	
The Fourth	Четвёртый	Aleksandr Stolper	Vladimir Vysotsky	Drama	
Gentlemen of Fortune	Джентльмены удачи	Aleksandr Seryj	Yevgeni Leonov, Georgi Vitsin	Comedy, crime	
The Golden Horns	Золотые рога	Aleksandr Rou	Raisa Ryazanova	Fantasy	
Grandmaster	Гроссмейстер	Sergey Mikaelyan	Andrey Myagkov	Drama	
Happy Go Lucky	Печки-лавочки	Vasily Shukshin	Vasily Shukshin, Lidiya Fedoseyeva-Shukshina, Vsevolod Sanayev, Georgi Burkov, Zinovy Gerdt	Comedy	
The Headless Horseman	Всадник без головы	Vladimir Vajnshtok	Ludmila Savelyeva, Oleg Vidov, Aarne Üksküla	Western	Adaptation of The Headless Horseman
Hello and Goodbye	Здравствуй и прощай	Vitaly Melnikov	Lyudmila Zaytseva	Comedy	
Hot Snow	Горячий снег	Gabriel Yegiazarov	Yuri Nazarov, Boris Tokarev, Anatoly Kuznetsov, Georgiy Zhzhonov	War film	
The Last Day	Самый последний день	Mikhail Ulyanov	Mikhail Ulyanov	Drama	
Lăutarii	Лаутары	Emil Loteanu	Sergei Lunkevich	Romantic drama	
The Love of Mankind	Любить человека	Sergei Gerasimov	Anatoliy Solonitsyn	Drama	
A Man at His Place	Человек на своем месте	Aleksey Sakharov	Vladimir Menshov	Drama	
Monologue	Монолог	Ilya Averbakh	Mikhail Gluzsky, Margarita Terekhova, Marina Neyolova, Stanislav Lyubshin	Drama	Entered into the 1973 Cannes Film Festival
Point, Point, Comma...	Точка, точка, запятая...	Alexander Mitta	Sergei Danchenko	Comedy	
Privalov's Millions	Приваловские миллионы	Yaropolk Lapshin	Leonid Kulagin, Lyudmila Chursina, Vladislav Strzhelchik, Lyudmila Khityaeva	Drama	
Racers	Гонщики	Igor Maslennikov	Yevgeny Leonov	Drama	
Ruslan and Lyudmila	Руслан и Людмила	Aleksandr Ptushko	Valeri Kozinets, Natalya Petrova, Andrei Abrikosov, Vladimir Fyodorov, Vyacheslav Nevinny	Fantasy	
Russian Field	Русское поле	Nikolai Moskalenko	Nonna Mordyukova, Vladimir Tikhonov, Leonid Markov, Lyudmila Khityaeva, Inna Makarova	Drama	
The Saplings	Саженцы	Rezo Chkheidze	Ramaz Chkhikvadze, Kakhi Kavsadze	Comedy	Entered into the 8th Moscow International Film Festival
The Seagull	Чайка	Yuli Karasik	Alla Demidova	Drama	
The Seventh Bullet	Седьмая пуля	Ali Khamraev	Dilorom Kambarova, Suimenkul Chokmorov, Bolot Bejshenaliyev, Talgat Nigmatulin	Action	
The Stationmaster	Станционный смотритель	Sergei Solovyov	Nikolai Pastukhov, Marianna Kushnerova, Nikita Mikhalkov	Drama	
Shadow-boxing	Бой с тенью	Valentin Popov	Pavel Sergeichev, Natalia Bespalova, Gustav Kirschtein, Yuriy Nazarov, Lyudmila Shagalova, Igor Kosukhin	Drama	
Solaris	Солярис	Andrei Tarkovsky	Donatas Banionis, Natalya Bondarchuk, Jüri Järvet, Vladislav Dvorzhetsky	Sci-fi	Special Jury Prize at the 1972 Cannes Film Festival
Taming of the Fire	Укрощение огня	Daniil Khrabrovitsky	Kirill Lavrov, Andrei Popov, Innokenty Smoktunovsky	Biopic	
A Teacher of Singing	Учитель пения	Naum Birman	Andrei Popov	Comedy	
Train Stop — Two Minutes	Стоянка поезда — две минуты	Mark Zakharov, Aleksander Orlov	Yuri Belov, Oleg Vidov, Valentina Telichkina	Musical	
Winnie-the-Pooh and a Busy Day	Винни-Пух и день забот	Fyodor Khitruk	Vladimir Osenev, Yevgeny Leonov, Iya Savvina, Erast Garin, Zinaida Naryshkina	Animation	
