= Vincent Bruel =

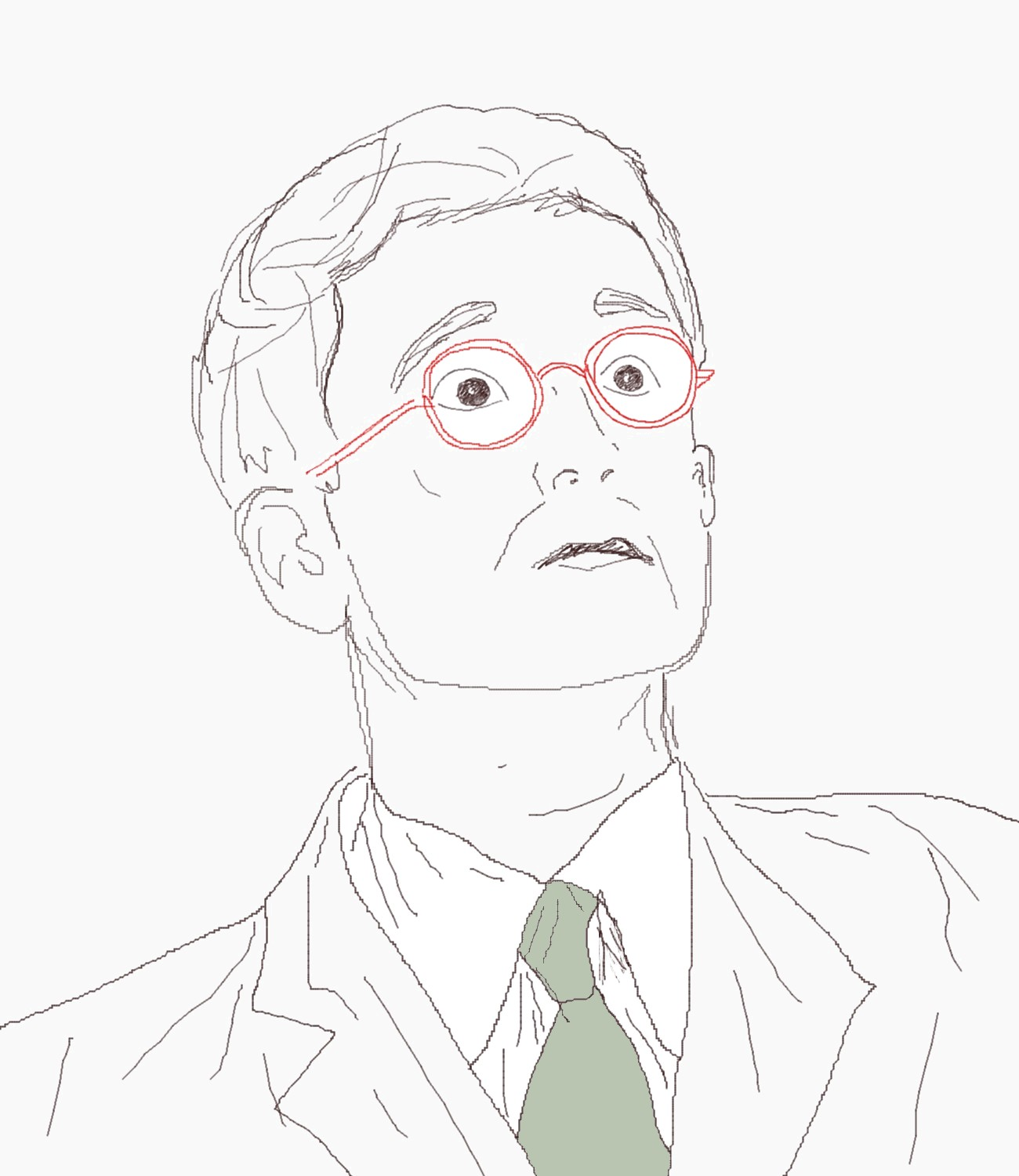
- Vincent Bruel, portrait.
- Born: 9 November 1973; Toulouse, France
- Died: c. 18 January 2005 (aged 31); Toulouse, France
- Resting place: Ossen, France
- Occupation: Juggler
- Years active: 1988–2005
- Awards: Grock d'Or; Yuri Nikulin trophy
- Website: http://vincentbruel.com/

Vincent Bruel (9 November 1973 – c. 18 January 2005) was a French juggler. Born in Toulouse, he studied and taught at Le Lido, and is known for his experimental approach and studies on the practice of juggling.

== Biography ==
=== Discovery of juggling ===
Vincent Bruel was born in Toulouse on 9 November 1973. His parents were part of an amateur theatre troupe. At the age of 14, he made his first steps on stage as an extra in the event show Antoine Colinet, compagnon bâtisseur by Claude Moreau. There he discovered staged juggling thanks to the Company L'Oboubambulle. He then initiated himself to different juggling practices (grain balls, stick of the devil, diabolo, clubs, cigar box, scarves) and circus (unicycle).

At the age of 18, he joined the Centre des Arts du Cirque de Toulouse, Le Lido. He later became a teacher there.

=== Career ===
Member of the duo VLV as well as the companies Triplex and Vis-à-Vis which toured between 1995 and 2001 with Christian Coumin, Lionel About, Pierre Biondi, David Löchen, Geo Martinez and Florence Meurisse, Vincent Bruel was a member of the Company Les objets volants alongside Sylvain Garnavault and Denis Paumier in 2003. With the shows The Lost Ball, Visa pour l'Amour and Contrepoint, he quickly made himself noticed by the public and specialists.

He has created solo numbers in which technical mastery is obvious without being a finality in itself. Juggling becomes a means of interpretation, a manipulation of objects and a language in its own right. The most noticed of his solos is Tac Tac Tango in which he handles two balloons each attached to a string of which he holds the other end in his hands. He adopts a style of cold comedy, English burlesque and his character tinged with humour and poetry triumphs on many scenes. He was seen in 2003 on the TV show Le plus grand cabaret du monde, on the stages of the 25th World Circus Festival of Tomorrow in Paris, in the shows of the Casino-Cabarets of Monte-Carlo and Lebanon, at the Shiodome Festival in Tokyo and at the Grockland Festival in Switzerland.

He was one of the first French artists to take a close look at the mathematical notation of juggling (siteswap or juggler's rhythmic score) and participated in their application in juggling rebound. This allowed him to explore the paths of pedagogy and audiovisual. In 2001, he produced with Jean-François Valentin Bouncing in Paris, Du Rebond à Paname, a didactic film on rebound techniques and a juggled walk through the streets of Paris. For his realization, he collaborated with essential figures of juggling: Sean Gandini and Kati Ylä-Hokkala (Gandini Juggling), Denis Paumier (Les objets volants), Olivier Alenda (Cie 111, Courants Porteurs), Aurelien Bory (Cie 111), Antonio Bucci, Roseline Guinet (Les Nouveaux Nez & Cie), Jive Faury and Kim Huynh (Sens Dessus Dessous), Jean Daniel Fricker (Jonglorsion)...

=== Death ===
Vincent Bruel committed suicide on the night of 17–18 January 2005 at Le Lido, in Toulouse.

Alain Pacherie, Founder of the Cirque Phénix, President of the Académie Fratellini and President of the World Circus Festival of Tomorrow, soberly announced: "Vincent Bruel has decided to juggle with the stars, he is no longer among us". He was buried on 22 January 2005 in Ossen, a Pyrenean village. During the ceremony, many artists began to juggle.

== Performances ==
=== Shows ===
- Le p’tit bal perdu
- Visa pour l’Amour
- Contrepoint
- Tac Tac Tango

=== Filmography ===
- Bouncing in Paris, du rebond à Paname, 2002
- Siteswaps: A Mathematical Juggling Journey, 2006

== Prizes and legacy ==
=== Awards ===
- 1994: 2nd price CIRCA at Auch, with VLV.
- 1996: Special price of Valentin Gneushev at the Festival Mondial du cirque de demain.
- 2004: Yuri Nikulin trophy.
- 2004: Grock d'or international trophy.
- 2004: Jury Prize at the Festival Mondial du Cirque de Demain, for Tac Tac Tango.
- 2004: Prize of the French Federation of Circus Schools.

=== Legacy ===
- His friends and colleagues Denis Paumier and Sylvain Garnavault dedicated the Contrepoint project to him.
- Henri Guichard and Francis Rougemont from the Centre des Arts du Cirque Le Lido with the Toulouse City Council have set up a "Vincent Bruel Scholarship" to help artists in difficulty.
- In his memory, the "Coup de cœur" of the jury of the Festival Mondial du Cirque de Demain became the "Prix Vincent Bruel".

== World records ==
Bruel held three world records in bounce passing with his teammate Sylvain Garnavault.

World records in bounce passing
Equipment	Performance	Teammate	Date
15 balls	103 catches	Sylvain Garnavault (FRA)	2004
13 balls	1 min 58 s	Sylvain Garnavault (FRA)	2004
11 balls	6 min 17 s	Sylvain Garnavault (FRA)	2004
