= Monologue (disambiguation) =

A Monologue is an extended uninterrupted speech by a character in a drama. It can also refer to:

- Monologue (film), a 1972 Soviet film
- "Monologue", a song by South Korean singer Taemin from the 2019 EP Want
- "Monologue", a song by South Korean singer Tei released in 2022
