= Konstantin Zagorsky =

Russian production designer (1933–2024)

Konstantin Ivanovich Zagorsky (Russian: Константин Иванович Загорский; 13 July 1933 – 18 August 2024) was a Russian production designer in film and painter

== Biography ==
In 1964, he graduated from the Gerasimov Institute of Cinematography, specializing in "film artist". He worked as a production designer at the Gorky Film Studio.

Zagorsky died on 18 August 2024, at the age of 91.

== Selected filmography ==
- Aladdin and His Magic Lamp (1967)
- Treasure Island (1971)
- Moscow-Cassiopeia (1973)
- Teens in the Universe (1974)
- The Little Mermaid (1976)
- The Scarlet Flower (1977)
- Armed and Dangerous (1977)
- The New Adventures of Captain Wrongel (1978)
- Per Aspera Ad Astra (1980)
- The Star and Death of Joaquin Murieta (1982)
- Mio in the Land of Faraway (1987)
- A Little Princess (1997)
- Holiday (2001)
