= List of Soviet films of the 1970s =

A list of films produced in the Soviet Union between 1970 and 1979:

== 1970s ==
- Soviet films of 1970
- Soviet films of 1971
- Soviet films of 1972
- Soviet films of 1973
- Soviet films of 1974
- Soviet films of 1975
- Soviet films of 1976
- Soviet films of 1977
- Soviet films of 1978
- Soviet films of 1979
