= Other People's Letters =

- Russian: Чужие письма
- Directed by: Ilya Averbakh
- Written by: Natalya Ryazantseva
- Starring: Irina Kupchenko; Svetlana Smirnova; Sergei Kovalenkov; Zinaida Sharko; Oleg Yankovskiy
- Cinematography: Dmitriy Dolinin
- Edited by: I. Smirnova
- Music by: Oleg Karavaychuk
- Production company: Lenfilm
- Release date: 1975
- Running time: 93 minutes
- Country: Soviet Union
- Language: Russian

Other People's Letters (Russian: Чужие письма) is a 1975 Soviet drama film directed by Ilya Averbakh. The film was shot in Kaluga.

== Plot ==
The film centers on the complex relationship between Vera Ivanovna, a single schoolteacher, and Zina Begunkova, her 16-year-old student from a troubled background. Zina’s mother is in prison, and she has been raised by her brother; her father is absent. Vera lives alone, occasionally dating a painter named Igor.

Zina is impulsive and strong-willed. At the beginning of the film, she confesses her feelings to a mature man, Zhenya Pryakhin, who is unsettled by her behavior and rejects her, even pushing her into a river during the encounter. Devastated, Zina does not return home that evening and instead appears at her teacher’s window, soaking wet and in distress.

Vera takes her in, hoping to guide the girl and foster empathy through personal mentorship. However, the lack of boundaries in their relationship becomes a critical error. Zina soon feels a sense of control over Vera’s life, particularly after she secretly reads private letters between Vera and her lover, Igor. Enthralled by the emotional content, Zina rewrites one of the letters, changing the names so it appears to be from Pryakhin to herself. She tries to share the letter with a friend at school, but it falls into the hands of her classmates and is read aloud. Recognizing Zina's handwriting, the class mocks her for writing the letter to herself.

The incident escalates: the entire class and several teachers, including Vera, read the letter. Vera is shaken by the realization that her students are not innocent or playful, but capable of cruelty and a lack of empathy. Zina, for her part, is outraged that no one believes her.

Though Zina attempts to leave Vera’s home, Vera stops her and chooses to forgive the invasion of privacy. This act of forgiveness further reinforces Zina’s sense of power over her teacher. The situation culminates when Zina tries to lock Vera inside the apartment to prevent her from going out for a late-night date. Unable to reason with the girl, Vera responds by slapping her.

In the film’s final scene, Zina is seen taking charge of her classmates during a school cleanup, directing them with passion and arrogance. The teacher is absent as the class departs. The ending is left open, inviting reflection on what the future holds for Vera Ivanovna.

== Cast ==
- Irina Kupchenko as Vera Ivanovna (as I. Kupchenko)
- Svetlana Smirnova as Zina Begunkova (as S. Smirnova)
- Sergei Kovalenkov as Igor (as S. Kovalenko)
- Zinaida Sharko as Angelina Grigoryevna (as Z. Sharko)
- Oleg Yankovskiy as Priachin (as O. Yankovskiy)
- Ivan Bortnik as Shura (as I. Bortnik)
- Natalya Skvortsova as Valya (as N. Skvortsova)
- Pyotr Arzhanov as Nikolay Artomovich
- Mayya Bulgakova
- Valentina Vladimirova
