= The Voice (1982 film) =

The Voice (Russian: Голос, romanized: Golos)
- Directed by: Ilya Averbakh
- Written by: Natalya Ryazantseva
- Produced by: Sergey Selyanov; Natalya Drozd-Makan; Konstantin Ernst
- Starring: Natalya Sayko; Leonid Filatov; Grigori Kalatosishvili; Vsevolod Shilovsky; Petr Shelokhonov; Yelena Safonova
- Cinematography: Dmitry Dolinin
- Edited by: Olga Amosova; Aleksandra Borovskaya
- Music by: Nikolai Karetnikov
- Production company: Lenfilm
- Distributed by: Lenfilm; Goskino; Sovexportfilm
- Release date: 18 December 1982
- Running time: 87 minutes
- Country: Soviet Union
- Language: Russian
- Budget: $6,500,000 (estimated)

The Voice (Russian: Голос, romanized: Golos), is a 1982 Soviet psychological drama film. It is based on the screenplay of the same name by Natalya Ryazantseva and directed by her husband Ilya Averbakh. This was Averbakh's last film as director.

== Plot ==
Actress Yulia Martynova (Natalya Sayko) is starring in a new film, but in the middle of the film production she is suddenly hospitalized with a serious illness. The film director (Leonid Filatov) is emotionally involved; he becomes nervous and frustrated because the film cannot be completed without the leading actress. All crew members are nervous witnessing the unfolding disaster, but the actress comes back from her hospital bed to the studio to continue her work in post-production. Yulia is so devoted to being original in the creative process that she cannot allow her character speaking with the voice of another actress, so she deals with her health condition by taking drugs to overcome the pain, in order to contribute her original voice to the film. The cast and crew members are helping the leading star to continue working while she battles with the terminal condition, so she delivers her role elegantly thus contributing to successful result. Her original voice slightly altered by her illness brings a new depth and meaning to the film after her death.

== Cast ==
- Natalya Sayko as Julia Martynova
- Leonid Filatov as Film director Sergei
- Grigori Kalatozishvili as Writer
- Yelizaveta Nikishchikhina as Anna Viktorova
- Vsevolod Shilovsky as Cameraman
- Sergei Bekhterev as Composer
- Petr Shelokhonov as Producer Leonid Borisovich
- Vasili Bochkarev as Arkady
- Yelena Safonova as Sveta
- Tatyana Kravchenko as Nurse Nadya
- Tatyana Pankova as art director
- Georgy Berezovsky as sound technician
- Tatyana Lavrova as Akhtyrskaya
- Mikhail Gluzsky as Pavel Platonovich
- Tatyana Rodionova as Film editor
- Alla Osipenko as Julia's neighbor
- Boris Eifman as cameo
- Andrei Urgant as cameo
- Igor Yefimov as cameo
- Sergei Snezhkin as cameo
- Nina Usatova as cameo

== Production ==
The film was produced by Lenfilm studios in Leningrad (St. Petersburg), Russia, former USSR. Filming locations were in the city of Leningrad (St. Petersburg) and its suburbs, as well as in Moscow. Post-production was done at Lenfilm studios. Production dates were from October 1980 to October 1982.

== Reception ==
The film was released on 18 December 1982, in Leningrad (St. Petersburg), with the premiere at the Dom Kino (House of Film) in Leningrad. Attendance was 2.3 million viewers internationally in the first year after release. The film was released in East Germany on 28 October 1983, with narration and subtitles in German.

== Facts and connections ==
- The original director's cut was 93 minutes; currently available copies are reduced to 87 min.
- This was the first Soviet film openly dealing with drug and alcohol abuse among Soviet actors, alluding to artists struggling with the system. The title, Golos (meaning 'voice'), has allusion to the voice of Vladimir Vysotsky, a dissident star actor and singer who died at age 42, in 1980. Director Ilya Averbakh knew Vysotsky, so the film Golos was made to support those with independent mind and voice.
- Director Ilya Averbakh died aged 51, three years after the film was released.
- Director Ilya Averbakh was a medical doctor, before he became a film director, so he had additional professional knowledge and understanding about stress and pressures on independent minds in the Soviet Union.
- The film Golos was released after the death of Leonid Brezhnev when KGB chief Yuri Andropov came to power in the Soviet Union.
