= Tomorrow, on April 3rd... =

- Russian: Завтра, третьего апреля…
- Directed by: Igor Maslennikov
- Written by: Vladimir Valutsky; Ilya Zverev
- Starring: Eneken Aksel; Lyudmila Volynskaya; Viktor Ilichyov; Pavel Luspekayev; Aleksandr Demyanenko; Vyacheslav Goroshenkov
- Cinematography: Vladimir Vasilyev
- Edited by: Lyudmila Pechieva
- Music by: Alexander Kolker
- Production company: Lenfilm
- Release date: 1969
- Running time: 70 min.
- Country: Soviet Union
- Language: Russian

Tomorrow, on April 3rd... (Russian: Завтра, третьего апреля…, romanized: Zavtra, tretyego aprelya...) is a 1969 Soviet teen comedy-drama film directed by Igor Maslennikov.

== Plot ==
On April Fools' Day in a Leningrad school, Vova Ryashentsev receives a note from his classmate, Masha Gavrikova, inviting him to the cinema. Masha, the author of the note, is a girl Vova likes very much. However, after consulting with a friend, he concludes that the invitation is a prank.

Later, Vova realizes he was wrong and persuades the entire class to take a pledge: the following day, everyone will speak only the truth and not tell a single lie. At first, this seems like a noble and important initiative. However, they soon discover that even with the best intentions, speaking the truth can hurt and offend others.

Their young homeroom teacher, Ariadna Nikolaevna, helps the students understand an important lesson: "Truth must always be spoken, but it does not absolve us from the need to be sensitive, tactful, and considerate toward one another. To be truthful is to be just, kind, and a truly good person."

== Cast ==
- Eneken Aksel as Ariadna Nikolaevna (voiced by Marina Neyolova)
- Lyudmila Volynskaya as Lyudmila Petrovna, teacher of literature
- Viktor Ilichyov as Stanislav Petrovich
- Pavel Luspekayev as Ferapontov
- Aleksandr Demyanenko as police lieutenant
- Vyacheslav Goroshenkov as Vova Ryashentsev
- Natalia Danilova as Masha Gavrikova
- Larisa Malevannaya as Masha Gavrikova's mother
- Yevgeni Malyantsev as Yura Fonarev
- Vladimir Pirozhkov as Kolyan
- Konstantin Raikin as high school joker
