= Drama from Ancient Life =

- Movie poster
- Russian: Драма из старинной жизни
- Directed by: Ilya Averbakh
- Written by: Ilya Averbakh; Vladimir Belyaev; Nikolai Leskov
- Produced by: G. Didenko
- Starring: Yelena Solovey; Anatoly Yegorov; Yevgeny Perov
- Cinematography: Dmitry Meskhiev Sr.
- Edited by: R. Schwartz
- Music by: Oleg Karavaychuk
- Production company: Lenfilm
- Release date: 1971
- Running time: 84 min.
- Country: Soviet Union
- Language: Russian

Drama from Ancient Life (Russian: Драма из старинной жизни, romanized: Drama iz starinnoy zhizni) is a 1971 Soviet historical drama film directed by Ilya Averbakh. It is based on the story by Nikolai Leskov The Hair Dresser.

== Plot ==
The story of the two lovers, the count's hairdresser Arkady and the serf actress Lyuba, unfolds in an environment that fancifully combines dense wildness with an external gloss, barbarism - with the appearance of enlightenment. Young people manage to escape, but their happiness is not destined to come true.

== Cast ==
- Yelena Solovey as Lyuba
- Anatoly Yegorov as Arkady
- Yevgeny Perov as Count Kamensky
- Sofya Pavlova as Drosida
- Aleksandr Khlopotov as Kamensky Jr.
- Lyudmila Arinina as mammy
- Rasmi Djabrailov as Khraposhka
- Felix Antipov as a priest
- Aleksandr Demyanenko as Yeroshka
- Viktor Ilichyov as Afanaska
