= Sincerely Yours... =

- Russian: Искренне Ваш…
- Directed by: Alla Surikova
- Written by: Valentin Azernikov
- Starring: Vitali Solomin; Vera Glagoleva; Viktor Ilichyov; Rolan Bykov; Armen Dzhigarkhanyan
- Cinematography: Vsevolod Simakov
- Music by: Viktor Lebedev
- Production company: Mosfilm
- Distributed by: Goskino
- Release date: 1985
- Running time: 86 minute
- Country: Soviet Union
- Language: Russian

Sincerely Yours... (Russian: Искренне Ваш…) is a 1985 Soviet romantic comedy film directed by Alla Surikova. and written by Valentin Azmernikov.

== Plot ==
The film tells about a young employee of the observatory, who is looking for a new lens and dedicated his life to this. Only earthly love can stop him.

== Cast ==
- Vitali Solomin as Pasha Dobrynin
- Vera Glagoleva as Katya
- Viktor Ilichyov as Yura
- Rolan Bykov as Postnikov
- Armen Dzhigarkhanyan as Serafimov
- Larisa Udovichenko as Lusya
- Nikolay Parfyonov as Novikov
- Leonid Kuravlyov as Emtsov
- Irina Shmeleva as Lena
- Elena Sanayeva as Baba-Yaga
