= For the Rest of His Life =

- Written by: Boris Vakhtin; Pyotr Fomenko
- Directed by: Pyotr Fomenko
- Starring: Alexey Eybozhenko; Ernst Romanov; Lyudmila Arinina; Taisia Kalinchenko
- Theme music composer: Veniamin Basner
- Country of origin: Soviet Union
- Original language: Russian

Production
- Cinematography: Vyacheslav Babenko
- Running time: 270 minutes
- Production company: Lentelefilm

Original release
- Release: 1975 – 1975

For the Rest of His Life (Russian: На всю оставшуюся жизнь, Na vsyu ostavshuyusya zhizn) is a Soviet war drama mini-series. It is an adaptation of the novel The Train (Sputniki) by Vera Panova.

The mini-series consists of four episodes depicting a Soviet frontline hospital train during the German invasion of the Soviet Union.

== Plot ==
The first episode introduces the characters as Commissar Danilov (Alexey Eybozhenko) walks through the hospital train. The scene is interspersed with flashbacks of peaceful, happy lives before the war. When news of the war breaks, Danilov readies the train and assembles its personnel.

The second episode introduces severely wounded soldiers who, despite numerous surgeries and amputations, retain hope and optimism. Most remain undaunted, continuing to find joy in life.

The third episode recounts the difficult wartime lives of the medical staff, balanced by lighter and uplifting moments, including stories about a makeshift chicken coop on wheels and budding romances between senior nurse Yulia Dmitrievna and Doctor Suprugov, as well as nurse Faina and soldier Nizvetsky. New passengers join the train's crew, such as Uncle Sasha, a carpenter who lost his entire family of six in a train bombing, and Vaska, an orphan girl. Danilov allows Vaska to stay to help tend the train's chicken coop. Amid these moments, the series also explores tragic events in the lives of the characters. A notable moment occurs when Doctor Belov learns of the death of his wife and daughter in the siege of Leningrad.

The fourth episode depicts the bittersweet days leading up to victory. Lenochka Ogorodnikova discovers that Danya, the man she loves, has married another. Doctor Belov finally returns to Leningrad, only to find his home reduced to ruins, but learns that his son is alive and fighting at the front. Meanwhile, Yulia Dmitrievna travels on the train with her beloved Dr. Suprugov, filled with hope for their future together.

== Cast ==
- Alexey Eybozhenko as Commissar Danilov
- Ernst Romanov as Hospital train Commander Doctor Belov
- Lyudmila Arinina as Julia Dmitrievna
- Vladimir Bogin as Nikonov
- Yevgeny Solyakov as Danya
- Maya Bulgakova as Dusya
- Grigori Gai as intendant Sobol
- Valentin Gaft as Lt. Kramin
- Kira Golovko as Sonechka
- Mikhail Danilov as Doctor Suprugov
- Mikhail Zhigalov as one-legged Captain
- Sergey Zamorev as Nizvetsky
- Valery Zolotukhin as Sasha
- Taisia Kalinchenko as Lena Ogorodnikova
- Svetlana Karpinskaya as Nurse Faina
- Panteleimon Krymov as Sukhoyedov
- Gleb Strizhenov as Kravtsov
- Margarita Terekhova as Faina and one-legged pregnant woman
- Nina Urgant as Aunt Laundry
- Georgy Shtil as Goremykin

== Awards ==
- 1976 — Tbilisi TV Movie Festival Award
