= Aladdin and His Magic Lamp (1967 film) =

Aladdin's Magic Lamp
- Directed by: Boris Rytsarev
- Written by: Viktor Vitkovich; Grigoriy Yagdfeld
- Starring: Boris Bystrov; Dodo Chogovadze
- Cinematography: Vasiliy Dultsev, Lev Ragozin, M. Tsarkova, Yu. Miloslavskiy
- Edited by: G. Sadovnikova
- Music by: Aleksei Muravlyov
- Production company: Gorky Film Studio
- Release date: 1967
- Running time: 84 minutes
- Country: Soviet Union
- Language: Russian

Aladdin's Magic Lamp (Russian: Волшебная лампа Аладдина, romanized: Volshebnaya lampa Aladdina) is a 1967 Soviet fantasy film directed by Boris Rytsarev based on the tale Aladdin from One Thousand and One Nights.

== Plot ==
A magician asks the stars who can get him the magic lamp. They tell him that it should be Aladdin, the son of Ali al Maruf. The magician then seeks Aladdin throughout Baghdad. When he finds himself on the market, suddenly the sultan arrives with his beautiful daughter Budur and it is announced that the head will be cut off from the one who dares to look at them. The people kneel and lower their eyes as the sultans' magnificently decorated entourage passes through the ranks. On a whim, the princess wants Aladdin to look at her, though he would lose his life with it. They command him and he obeys. The guards want to arrest him then, but the magician steps in and helps Aladdin to escape, since he still needs his services.

Later, the Dark Wizard contacts Aladdin's family and pretends to be Ali al Maruf's brother. He persuades Aladdin to get an old copper lamp for him from the "Sunken City". When Aladdin wants to hand over the found lamp to his supposed uncle, he attacks him. Fighting, Aladdin falls back into the "Sunken City" with the coveted vessel. There he accidentally rubs the lamp, whereupon a djinn emerges. He fulfills his wish, namely to bring the princess to his parents' house. The city guards, however, track Aladdin there, arrest him and throw him in the dungeon. Aladdin's mother, who is now in possession of the magic lamp, then summons the genie and gets her son back. After some strange lamp-spirit-related incidents in the palace, Budur wishes to marry Aladdin. She persuades her father to agree by telling him that it is just a dream. At the wedding ceremony, however, it comes to a dispute between the lovers, as a result, the lamp comes into the possession of the Dark Wizard. With the power of the lamp, he immediately rises to the Sultan and wants to take Budur as his wife. He orders the djinn to kill Aladdin, but Aladdin has a brilliant idea – he suggests to the lamp-spirit to instead change into a pitcher to avoid the spell of the lamp. The sorcerer is immediately defeated, and those destined for each other begin a life together.

== Cast ==
- Boris Bystrov – Aladdin, the son of Ali-al-Maruf
- Dodo Chogovadze – Princess Budur
- Sary Garryýew – genie (voiced by Konstantin Nikolayev)
- Andrei Fajt – The Maghribite Sorcerer
- Otar Koberidze – Sultan
- Ekaterina Verulashvili – mother of Aladdin
- Huseynaga Sadygov – the great vizier
- Georgy Millyar – the Wisest
- Otar Bilanishvili – night watchman (in the credits of E. Bilanishvili)
- Valentin Bryleev – Mubarak, son of the Vizier
- Yury Chekulaev – Mustafa, the chief of the guard

Actor Boris Bystrov and production designer Konstantin Zagorsky both died on August 18, 2024.

== Production ==
Principal photography took place in Chersonesus.
