= Degree of Risk =

1968 Soviet film directed by Ilya Averbakh

- Russian: Степень риска
- Directed by: Ilya Averbakh
- Written by: Nikolai Amosov; Ilya Averbakh
- Starring: Boris Livanov; Innokentiy Smoktunovskiy; Alla Demidova; Lyudmila Arinina; Yuri Grebenshchikov
- Cinematography: Vladimir Kovzel
- Release date: 1968
- Country: Soviet Union
- Language: Russian

Degree of Risk (Russian: Степень риска) is a 1968 Soviet drama film directed by Ilya Averbakh, based on the story "The Thoughts and the Heart" by cardiac surgeon Nikolai Amosov.

The film tells about the doctor Sedov, who is forced to make a difficult decision about heart surgery of a famous mathematician.

== Plot ==
A renowned surgeon, Mikhail Ivanovich Sedov, decides to perform a critical heart valve replacement surgery after re-evaluating a long-time patient. As one of the most respected specialists in his field, Dr. Sedov is fully aware of the significant risks and the immense responsibility involved.

Following a thorough discussion with his colleagues, the team makes the crucial decision to proceed without delay and begins preparing the patient for surgery. After the operation, the surgical team endures a sleepless night, fighting to save the life of the patient, who has suffered significant blood loss. At dawn, seeing that the now-conscious Sasha is out of danger, the exhausted doctor heads home, taking a moment to reassure the patient's wife, who has stayed awake throughout the ordeal.

== Cast ==
- Boris Livanov as Sedov
- Innokentiy Smoktunovskiy as Sasha
- Alla Demidova as Zhenya
- Lyudmila Arinina as Mariya Aleksandrovna (as L. Arinina)
- Yuri Grebenshchikov as Oleg (as Yu. Grebenshchikov)
- Leonid Nevedomsky as Pyotr (as L. Nevedomsky)
- V. Vasilyev
- Yury Solovyov
