= The Scarlet Flower =

1858 Russian folk tale by Sergey Aksakov

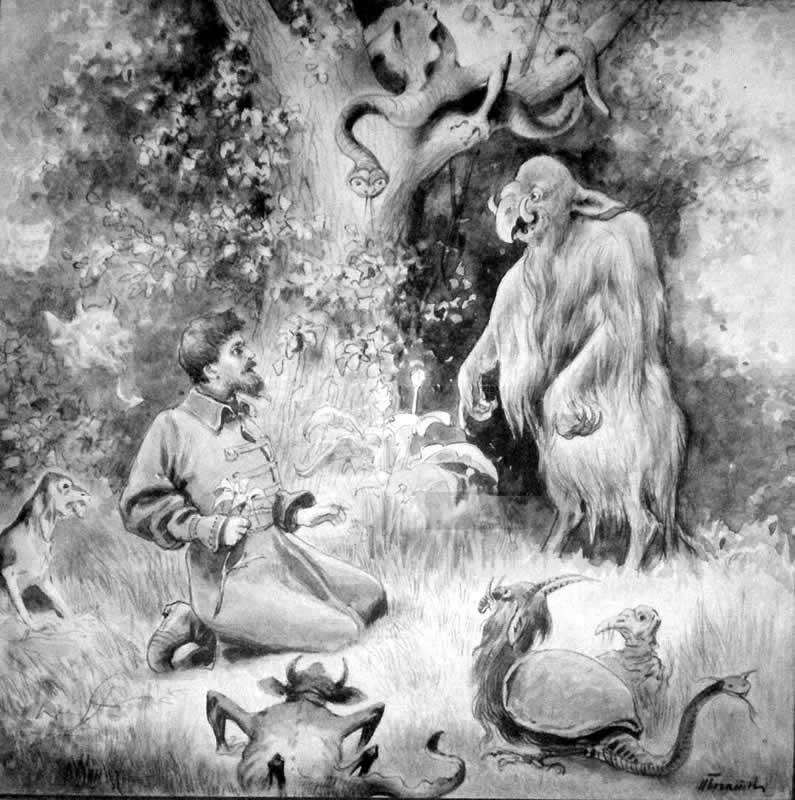
- The merchant meets the beast. Illustration by Nikolai Bogatov.

Folk tale
- Name: The Scarlet Flower
- Also known as: The Little Red Flower
- Country: Russia
- Published in: 1858
- Related: Beauty and the Beast

The Scarlet Flower (Russian: Аленький цветочек, romanized: Alen'kiy tsvetochek), also known as The Little Scarlet Flower or The Little Red Flower, is a Russian literary fairy tale written by Sergey Aksakov. It is a variation of the plot of the fairy tale Beauty and the Beast. In Russia, Beauty and the Beast story is known mostly via Aksakov's retelling.

== Publication ==
In a letter to his son of November 23, 1856 Aksakov wrote: "I am writing a story which in my childhood I knew by heart". Aksakov had been told that story as a child. He recalled that he was ill and suffered from insomnia. Then a housekeeper named Pelageya, who was well known for telling great fairy tales, sat by the stove and began to tell him the story of Scarlet Flower. Aksakov added that listening to the story did not make him feel sleepy at all, on the contrary, he couldn't fall asleep until the very end. The Scarlet Flower was first published in 1858. It was printed as an appendix in Aksakov's Childhood Years of Grandson Bagrov (Detskie gody Bagrova-vnuka; English translation: Years of Childhood) "not to interrupt the story of childhood".

== Synopsis ==
Once upon a time there lived a wealthy merchant, who had three beautiful daughters. Once he decided to do business overseas. He called for the daughters and asked what gifts should he bring them. The eldest asked for a golden tiara adorned with precious gems that sparkled brightly, and the second wanted a crystal mirror which always showed the person's reflection as young and beautiful. The merchant knew these would be difficult to obtain, but within his means. The youngest, named Nastenka (a diminutive form of the given name Anastasia), asked for the most beautiful scarlet flower in the world, which she had seen in a dream. The merchant did not know where he could find such a flower, but promised not to disappoint.

Everything went well. The merchant bought all gifts, except for the scarlet flower. He saw many scarlet flowers, but not the most beautiful one. On the way home he was attacked by robbers, fled into the woods and became lost. When he awoke the next morning he saw a splendid palace "in flame, silver and gold". He walked inside, marveling at the splendor, but the palace was seemingly empty. Spread before him was a luxurious feast, and he sat down and ate. When he walked out to the garden he saw the most beautiful scarlet flower, and knew it was the one his daughter desired. Upon picking it, the terrible Beast of the Forest leapt out and confronted the merchant, asking him why he dared pick the scarlet flower, the one joy of the beast's life. The beast demanded that the merchant repay him and forfeit his life. The merchant begged for mercy and to be returned to his daughters. The beast allowed this on the one condition that within the next three days one of his daughters would willingly take her father's place and live with the beast, or the merchant's life would be forfeit. The beast gave the merchant a ring, and the girl that put it on the littlest finger of her right hand would be transported to the palace. Then the beast magically transported the merchant home, with all his wealth and treasures restored.

The merchant explained what happened to his three daughters. The eldest two believed the youngest should go, since it was her present that caused this disaster. The youngest daughter loved her father so, so she willingly went to live with the beast. Nastenka lived luxuriously with the beast, who granted her every desire, fed her delicious food and gave her rich jewels and clothing, yet never revealed himself to her for fear of upsetting her. However Nastenka became fond of the beast and asked to see him. When he finally revealed himself to her, she was overcome with fear but controlled herself, and apologized to the beast for upsetting him. When Nastenka had a dream that her father was ill, the Beast let her visit him. However, he said that she must come back in three days, otherwise he would perish, since his love for her was so great he loved her more than himself, and could not bear to be apart from her.

Nastenka's visit to her father revived his spirits, but her sisters resented the wealth she lived in. They tried to talk her out of returning to the Beast, but Nastenka could not be so cruel to her kind host. The elder sisters put the clocks back and closed the windows, to trick Nastenka. When Nastenka felt that something had been wrong and came back to the Monster's palace, he lay dying near the scarlet flower. Nastenka rushed to his side, took him in her arms, and cried that she loved him more than herself, that he was her true love. All of a sudden thunder boomed, and Nastenka was transported to a golden throne next to a handsome prince. The handsome prince explained that he was the Beast, cursed by a witch who was fighting his father, a mighty king. To break the curse, a maiden had to fall in love with him in his monstrous form. The merchant gave his blessing to the young couple, who lived happily ever after.

== Analysis ==
=== Tale type ===
The tale is classified - and gives its name - to the East Slavic type SUS 425C, Russian: "Аленький цветочек", romanized: Alen'kyy tsvetochek, lit. 'The Scarlet Flower', of the East Slavic Folktale Classification (Russian: СУС, romanized: SUS (Сравнительный указатель сюжетов)): a father brings presents to his three daughters, the youngest asks for a scarlet flower, which belongs in the garden of a prince cursed to be a monster. In exchange for the flower the monster demands the daughter, marries her, and turns into a handsome man. According to folklorist Petro Lintur, variants of type ATU 425C are more frequently collected in East Slavic than other subtypes of ATU 425.

The prototype Beauty and the Beast is classified in the Aarne-Thompson-Uther Index as type ATU 425C, "Beauty and the Beast". It is related to the general type ATU 425, "The Search for the Lost Husband" and subtypes.

== Adaptations ==
- The Scarlet Flower (1952 film), Soviet animated film directed by Lev Atamanov and based on Aksakov's fairy tale
- The Scarlet Flower (1977 film), Soviet live action film directed by Irina Povolotskaya and based on Aksakov's fairy tale

== See also ==
- The Feather of Finist the Falcon
