= Valentin Gneushev =

Russian circus director and choreographer (1951–2026)

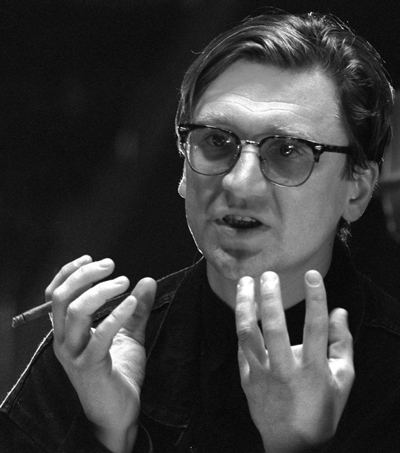
Gneushev in 2006

Valentin Alexandrovich Gneushev (Russian: Валентин Александрович Гнеушев; 20 December 1951 – 11 March 2026) was a Russian circus director and choreographer.

== Life and career ==
Gneushev was born in the city of Nizhny Tagil in the Sverdlovsk Oblast. He studied to be a clown at the Moscow State Circus School and later graduated from the Russian Academy of Theatrical Arts as an artistic director.

The first circus act he worked on, the aerial group performance "Cranes" (1985), was an instant success. It was on tour in many countries and received various awards.

In 1986, Gneushev’s "The Red Harlequin", performed by Vladimir Tsarkov, was awarded the Gold Medal at the International Circus Festival in Paris.

In 1989, he created an aerial act for Vladimir Kekhaial, who went on to work in Cirque du Soleil's Nouvelle Expérience show and later became a star in Las Vegas.

In 1991 his show Cirk Valentin was performed at the Gershwin Theatre on Broadway. The circus show, which used no animals and was designed for a theatrical stage, consisted entirely of acts created by Gneushev. An original music score for the show was written by composer Bobby Previte.

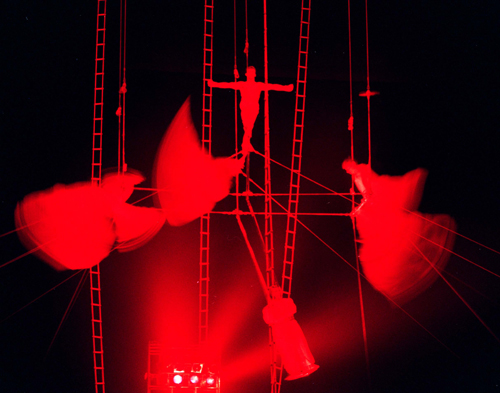
The "Chimes" aerial act that featured a cradle

Many of Gneushev's acts have been used in different circuses, including the Moscow State Circus, which often toured the United States, the Moscow Circus on Tsvetnoy Boulevard, Cirque du Soleil, which adapted them to their style, and in Las Vegas.

His approach to creating circus acts has made him over the years one of the most influential directors in the contemporary circus and a regular invited guest of the annual International Circus Festival of Monte-Carlo.

In the 1990s, Gneushev worked with the famous Russian clown Yuri Nikulin and was the artistic director of Nikulin’s Circus in Moscow.

Gneushev worked with prominent Russian film directors, such as Andrey Konchalovsky, and theatre directors such as Roman Viktyuk and Konstantin Raikin.

He appeared in the 1977 Soviet children's fairy tale film The Scarlet Flower (Alenkiy Tsvetochek).

Gneushev died in Moscow on 11 March 2026, at the age of 74.
