= Natalya Ryazantseva =

Russian screenwriter (1938–2023)

- Born: Natalya Borisovna Ryazantseva; 27 October 1938; Moscow, Russian SFSR, USSR
- Died: 10 January 2023 (aged 84)
- Other name: Natalia Ryazantseva
- Occupation: Screenwriter

Natalya Borisovna Ryazantseva (Russian: Наталия Борисовна Рязанцева; 27 October 1938 – 10 January 2023) was a Russian screenwriter and academic.

== Life and career ==
Born in Moscow, Ryazantseva graduated from the Gerasimov Institute of Cinematography and started her career as a collaborator of Larisa Shepitko. During her career, she authored about two dozen film screenplays. Because of her work, she was named Honored Artist of the RSFSR. In addition to her cinema works, Ryazantseva was professor of scriptwriting at her alma mater. She died on 10 January 2023, at the age of 84. She had been married to the film director Ilya Averbakh.

== Selected filmography ==
- Wings (1966)
- Private Life of Kuzyayev Valentin (1967)
- The Long Farewell (1971/1987)
- Other People's Letters (1975)
- The Scarlet Flower (1977)
- A Painter's Wife Portrait (1981)
- The Voice (1982)
- Brothel Lights (2011)
