= The Little Cat =

- Russian: Котёнок
- Directed by: Ivan Popov
- Written by: Aleksandr Mavilov; Ivan Popov
- Produced by: Yelena Tsitsina
- Starring: Andrei Kuznetsov; Lyudmila Arinina; Aleksey Voytyuk; Tatyana Grauz; Mariya Popova
- Cinematography: Vladimir Fastenko
- Release date: 1996
- Country: Russia
- Language: Russian

The Little Cat (Russian: Котёнок) is a 1996 Russian children's adventure film directed by Ivan Popov.

== Plot ==
A girl from the musician's family wanted to buy a cat. Suddenly, the cat fell out of the window and was on the roof of the car, because of which he drove away from home.

== Cast ==
- Andrei Kuznetsov as Fedin
- Lyudmila Arinina as Grandmother
- Aleksey Voytyuk as Father
- Tatyana Grauz as Mother
- Mariya Popova as Manya (as Masha Popova)
- Aleksandr Popov as Sanya (as Sasha Popov)
- Aleksandr Churgin as Conductor
- Aleksandr Peskov as Thug #1
- Oleg Vershinin as Thug #2
