= Arkady Raikin =

Soviet actor

- Аркадий Райкин
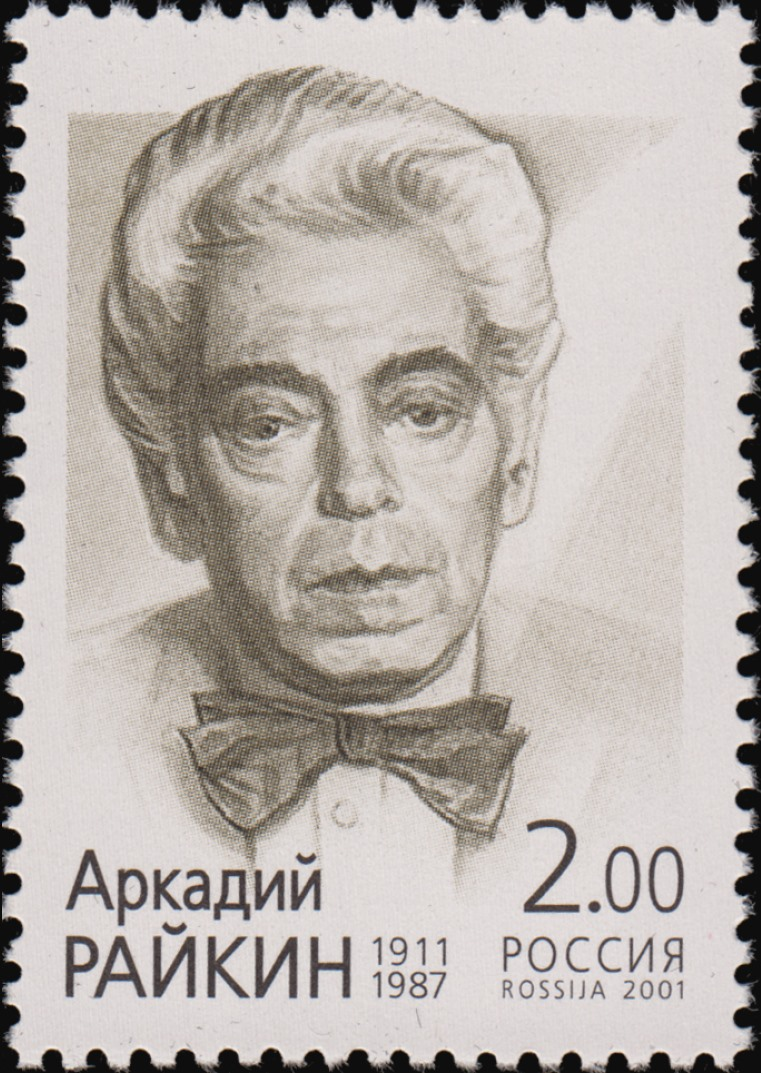
- Raikin on a 2001 stamp of Russia
- Born: Arkady Isaakovich Raikin; 24 October [O.S. 11 October] 1911; Riga, Governorate of Livonia, Russian Empire (now Latvia)
- Died: 17 December 1987 (aged 76); Moscow, Soviet Union
- Resting place: Novodevichy Cemetery, Moscow
- Spouse: Ruth Ioffe
- Children: 2, including Konstantin Raikin

Comedy career
- Years active: 1935–1987
- Medium: Stand-up, theater, radio, television, film
- Genres: Observational comedy, improvisational comedy, satire, musical comedy

Signature
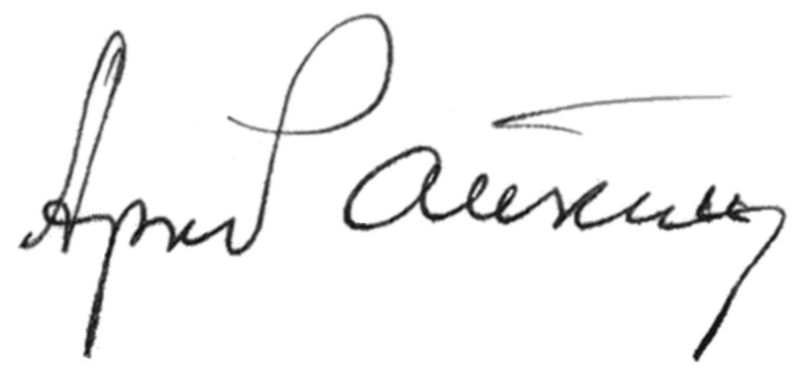

Arkady Isaakovich Raikin (Russian: Арка́дий Исаа́кович Ра́йкин; 24 October [O.S. 11 October] 1911 – 17 December 1987) was a Soviet stand-up comedian, stage and film actor, theater director, screenwriter and satirist. He led the school of Soviet and Russian humorists for about half a century. He is the father of Konstantin Raikin.

== Biography ==
Raikin was born into a Jewish family in Riga, in the Governorate of Livonia of the Russian Empire (present-day Latvia). He graduated from the Leningrad Theatrical Technicum in 1935 and worked in both state theatres and variety shows. In 1939, he founded his own theatre in Leningrad, where he used sketches and impersonations to ridicule the inefficiency of communist bureaucracy and the Soviet way of life. After graduating in 1935, he joined the troupe of the Workers' Youth Theatre. He made his debut in cinema and won the 1st contest of entertainers in the whole Soviet Union. He also appeared in several comedies during and after the Great Patriotic War.

Raikin created an array of popular satirical characters, some of which were featured in the TV serial People and Mannequins. He launched careers of several other prominent stand-up comedians, such as Mikhail Zhvanetsky and Roman Kartsev.

Raikin is often compared with Charlie Chaplin. His fame in the Soviet Union, and throughout Central and Eastern Europe, was such that he was invited to participate in the opening night of BBC Two television in 1964, although the broadcast had to be postponed for one day due to a power failure. His trip to London for the BBC broadcast—during which he was reunited with his British cousin, distinguished pianist Bruno Raikin—marked the first of only two times when the Soviet government permitted him to perform in the West. Arkady Raikin also maintained good working relationships with Marcel Marceau and some other foreign actors.

Three years before his death, Raikin finally moved to Moscow, where he opened the Satyricon Theatre, now run by his son Konstantin Raikin, also an acclaimed actor. His wife, Roma, played a major role in guiding his career, and his daughter, Ekaterina, also had a successful career as a Moscow actress. For a month during the summer of 1987, Raikin hosted his American cousin, Washington D.C. attorney Steven Raikin, as a guest in his Moscow flat. In September 1987 the Soviet Ministry of Culture finally permitted Raikin to visit the United States, where, with his son and daughter, he gave emotional farewell performances in several cities to adoring audiences of Russian émigrés.

== Awards ==
- Honored Artist of the RSFSR (1947)
- People's Artist of the RSFSR (1957)
- Two Orders of the Red Banner of Labour (1967, 1971)
- People's Artist of the USSR (1968)
- Lenin Prize (1980)
- Order of Lenin (1981)
- Hero of Socialist Labour (1981)
- Order of Friendship of Peoples

A minor planet 4518 Raikin discovered on 1 April 1976, is named after him.

== Filmography ==
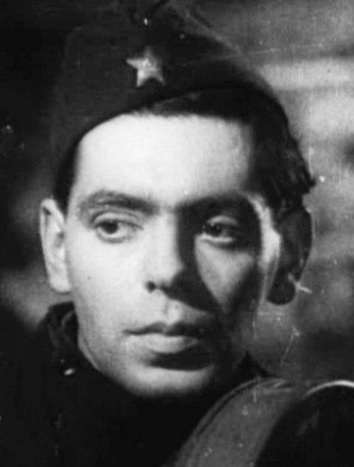
Raikin in the movie Concert for the Front, 1942

Actor

- Tractor Drivers (1939) – dancing tractor driver
- Doctor Kalyuzhnyy (1939) – Emmanuil 'Monya' Shapiro
- Valery Chkalov (1941) – American journalist
- Did We Meet Somewhere Before (1954) – Gennady Vladimirovich Maksimov

Director and screenplay

- People and Mannequins (1974)
- Peace to Your Home (1987)

== Sources ==
- Stites, Richard (1992). Russian Popular Culture: Entertainment and Society Since 1900. Cambridge: Cambridge University Press. pp. 80–81. ISBN 0-521-36986-X.
