= Viktor Ilichyov =

Soviet actor (1946–2010)

- Ilichyov in 1979
- Born: 5 February 1946; Leningrad, Soviet Union
- Died: 8 October 2010 (aged 64); Boca Raton, Florida, United States
- Occupation: Actor
- Years active: 1967-2006

Viktor Grigorievich Ilichyov (Russian: Виктор Григорьевич Ильичёв; 5 February 1946 — 8 October 2010) was a Soviet actor. He appeared in more than seventy films from 1967 to 2006. He lived in the United States of America beginning in 1992.

== Selected filmography ==
Viktor Ilichyov entered the twenty most filmed actors of the USSR, having played in 100 films until 1991.

Year	Title	Role	Notes
1966	Older Sister	entrant	
1967	Chronicles of a Dive Bomber	Osadchy	
1967	Commissar	episode	
1967	Private Life of Kuzyayev Valentin	Valentin Kuzyaev	
1969	Mama Married	Leonard	
1969	Tomorrow, on April 3rd...	Stanislav Petrovich	
1971	Drama from Ancient Life	Afanaska	
1979	The Very Same Munchhausen	dancer in a tavern	
1979	Tailcoat for Scapegrace	Georgy Myakishev	
1980	The Evening Labyrinth	Nikolay Alekseev	
1985	Sincerely Yours...	Yura	
1985	The Most Charming and Attractive	Dima	
1989	A Bright Personality	Yusupov	
1989	Two Arrows. Stone Age Detective	Hurried	
1991	Genius	Makar	
1993	Nastya	episode	
