= Satyricon (theatre) =

Theatre in Moscow, Russia

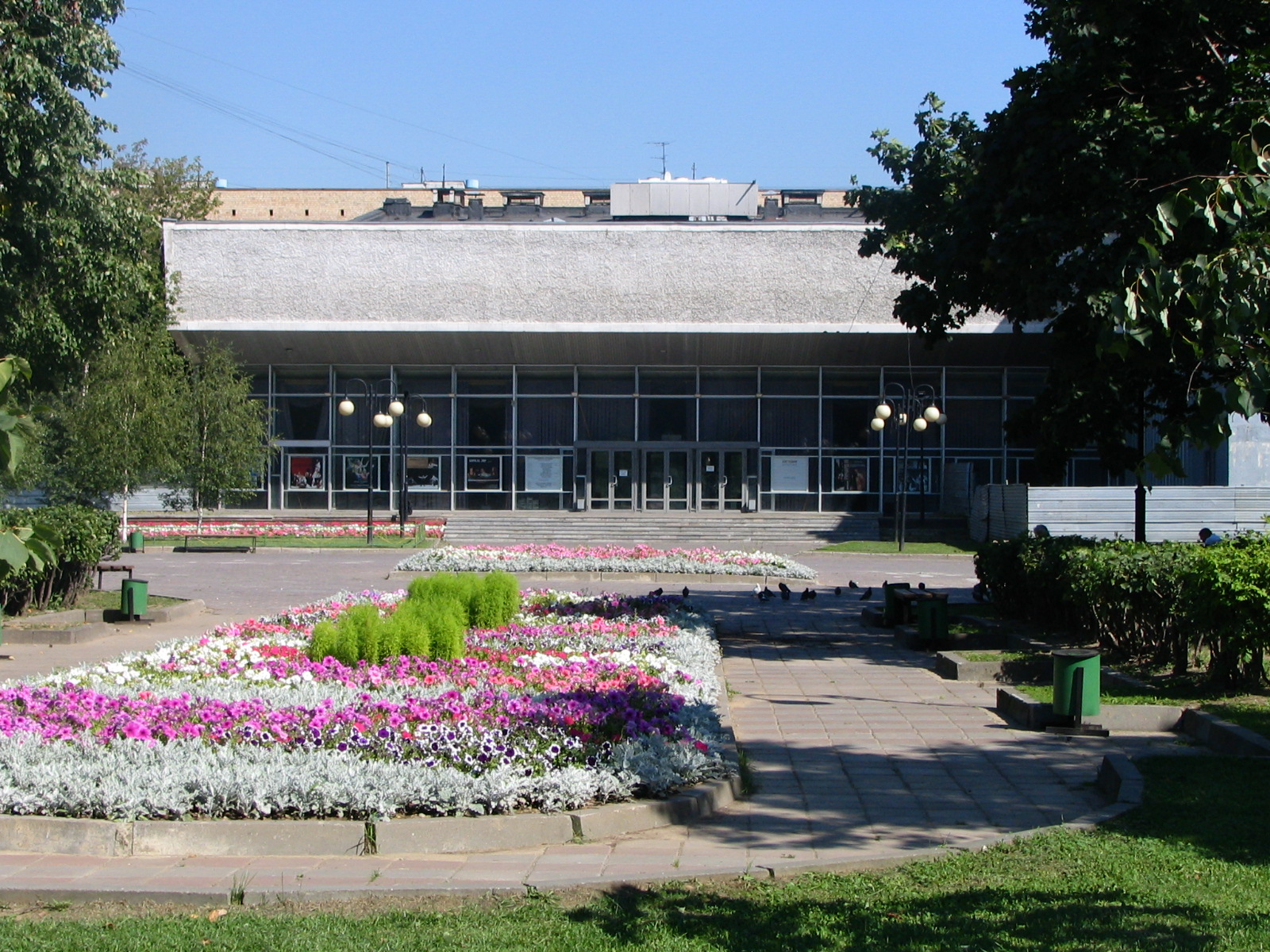
Satyricon Theatre

The Satyricon Theatre (Russian: Сатирикон), also known as Russian state theater "Satyricon" named after Arkady Raikin (Российский государственный теа́тр «Сатирико́н» и́мени Арка́дия Ра́йкина, Rossiyskiy gosudarstvennyy teatr «Satirikon» imeni Arkadiya Raykina), is a Moscow theatre directed by actor Konstantin Raikin, son of Arkady Isaakovich.

Satyricon was initially founded as the Leningrad Variety and Miniature Theatre in 1939. In 1982, the theatre moved to Moscow, and from 1987 it was renamed as "Satyricon". It has a large and small stage.

In 2013, the Center for Culture, Art and Leisure named after Arkady Raikin opened near the theatre, consisting of Raikin Plaza, a shopping and entertainment complex, and the Higher School of Performing Arts. In August 2015 the theatre building closed for a large-scale reconstruction, with large stage performances continuing in the "Planet of KVN", at 2 Sheremetyevskaya street, and the plays for the small stage in the Training Theatre of the Higher School of Performing Arts at 6/2 Sheremetevskaya Street. The facility was planned to be commissioned in 2019.
