= Lyudmila Arinina =

Soviet and Russian actress (1926–2026)

- Людмила Аринина
- Arinina in 1973
- Born: Lyudmila Mikhailovna Arinina; 8 November 1926; Sinodskoye, Saratov Governorate, Russian SFSR, Soviet Union
- Died: 14 March 2026 (aged 99); Moscow, Russia
- Occupation: Actress
- Years active: 1948–2026
- Spouses: Nikolai Mokin (m. 1960; died 1982); Nikolai Semyonov (m. 1989; died 2021)
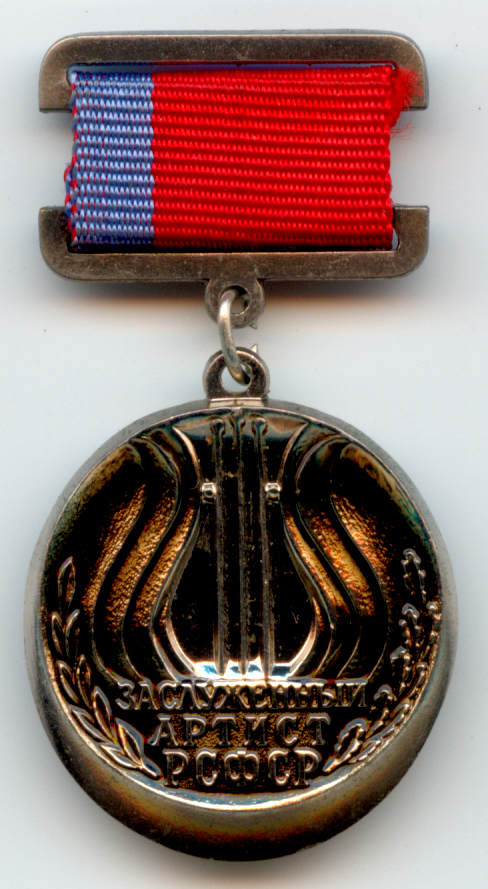
- Awards

Lyudmila Mikhailovna Arinina (Russian: Людмила Михайловна Аринина; 8 November 1926 – 14 March 2026) was a Soviet and Russian actress. She was named an Honored Artist of the RSFSR in 1976.

== Early life and career ==
Arinina was born on 8 November 1926 in Sinodskoye Village, Saratov Oblast. She was the daughter of painter Mikhail Alexandrovich Arinin (1897–1967). In 1948, she graduated from the acting department of GITIS (course of Vladimir Belokurov).

Arinina debuted in 1967 in the film Four Pages of One Young Life (directed by Rezo Esadze). Thereafter, she portrayed more than a hundred film roles, including roles in the films of director Pyotr Fomenko: For the Rest of His Life (1975), An Almost Funny Story (1977), Trips on an Old Car (1985). Her last screen appearance was in the television series Sklifosovsky in 2017.

== Personal life and death ==
Arinina first married Nikolai Mokin (1924–1984), theatre director and actor. In 1989, she married Nikolai Semyonov, retired lieutenant colonel. Arinina died in Moscow on 14 March 2026, at the age of 99.

== Selected filmography ==
- Degree of Risk (1968)
- Mama Married (1969)
- The Beginning (1970)
- About Love (1970)
- Drama from Ancient Life (1971)
- Belorussian Station (1971)
- A Teacher of Singing (1972)
- For the Rest of His Life (1975)
- A Declaration of Love (1977)
- An Almost Funny Story (1977)
- Investigation Held by ZnaToKi (1978)
- Waiting for Love (1981)
- Fathers and Grandfathers (1982)
- Guest from the Future (1985)
- Forgive Me (1986)
- Rock'n'roll for Princesses (1991)
- The Little Cat (1996)
- Life Is Full of Fun (2001)
- Long Farewell (2004)
- Father (2007)
- Fartsa (2015)
