= Yevgeni Lazarev =

Russian actor (1937–2016)

- Евгений Лазарев
- Born: Yevgeni Nikolayevich Lazarev; 31 March 1937; Minsk, Byelorussian SSR, Soviet Union (now Belarus)
- Died: 18 November 2016 (aged 79); Moscow, Russia
- Citizenship: Russia; United States
- Education: Moscow Art Theatre
- Occupations: Actor; director
- Years active: 1959—2016

Yevgeni Nikolayevich Lazarev (Belarusian: Яўген Мікалаевіч Лазараў; Russian: Евге́ний Никола́евич Ла́зарев; 31 March 1937 – 18 November 2016), also known as Eugene Lazarev, was a Russian actor and director.

== Biography ==
He graduated from the Moscow Art Theatre School-Studio, and played in the Riga Russian Drama Theatre and Mayakovsky Theatre.

In the 1990s, he emigrated to the United States, and later appeared in a number of Hollywood films, including The Saint, The Sum of All Fears, Lord of War, and Iron Man 2 (as Anton Vanko), as well as in TV series such as The West Wing (Episode: The Lame Duck Congress),] and Alias. In 2001 he appeared in the first season of 24as Nikola Luminović, a close friend of Dennis Hopper's Victor Drazen.

He was a professor at the Moscow Art Theatre Studio School and the Russian Academy of Theatre Arts, and was awarded the title of People's Artist of Russia. From 2003 to 2016, he had been teaching at the Stella Adler Studio of Acting of Los Angeles and the USC School of Cinematic Arts. He also voiced Imran Zakhaev in Activision's Call of Duty 4: Modern Warfare (2007). He died on 18 November 2016, at the age of 79.

== Filmography ==
- Vasily Surikov (1959) as Surikov
- Silence (1963) as Arkady Uvarov
- Crime and Punishment (1970) as dr. Zosimov
- Seventeen Moments of Spring (1973, TV Mini-Series) as Emelyanov
- The Road to Calvary (1975) as Prince Lobanov-Rostovsky
- Gypsies Are Found Near Heaven (1976)
- Investigation Held by ZnaToKi (1981, TV Series) as Vladimir Tarasovich Vasykin
- Private Life (1982) as Viktor Sergeyevich
- Fathers and Grandfathers (1982) as Nikolay
- Stalin (1992, TV Movie) as Andrey Vyshinsky
- The Ice Runner (1993) as Nikolay Antonov
- The Saint (1997) as President Karpov
- Hamilton (1998) as Yuri Chivartsev
- The West Wing (2000, TV Series) as Vassily Kononov
- The Quickie (2001) as Uncle Anatoly
- Alias (2001, TV Series) as dr. Kreshnik
- 24 (2002, TV Series) as Nikola Luminovic
- The Sum of All Fears (2002) as General Dubinin
- ER (2002, TV Series) as Ivo Guter
- Duplex (2003) as Mr. Dzerzhinsky
- Pearl Diver (2004) as Issac Epp
- Malachance (2004) as Mr. Karmin
- The Turkish Gambit (2005) as Alexander II of Russia
- Lord of War (2005) as General Dmitri Volkov
- The Unit (2006, TV Series) as Russian Ambassador
- Call of Duty 4: Modern Warfare (2007) as Imran Zakhaev
- The Nine (2006, TV Series) as Mr. Lushtak
- The Onion Movie (2008) as Slovesevic
- The Pink Panther 2 (2009) as Pope
- Driven to Kill (2009) as bartender
- Iron Man 2 (2010) as Anton Vanko (final film role)

== Awards ==
- Honored Artist of the RSFSR (1973)
- People's Artist of the RSFSR (1982)
- Order of Friendship of Peoples
- Order of Honour (1998)
- Moscow Prize
