= On Thin Ice (1966 film) =

- Poster
- Directed by: Damir Vyatich-Berezhnykh
- Written by: Ivan Bakurinsky
- Based on: Po tonkomu ldu by Georgiy Bryantsev
- Starring: Viktor Korshunov; Feliks Yavorskiy; Alexey Eybozhenko; Mikhail Gluzsky; Izolda Izvitskaya; Aleksey Alekseev
- Cinematography: Nikolay Olonovskiy
- Edited by: Aleksandra Kamagorova
- Music by: Mieczysław Weinberg
- Production company: Mosfilm
- Distributed by: Gosfilm
- Release date: 26 September 1966
- Running time: 175 minutes
- Country: Soviet Union
- Language: Russian

On Thin Ice (Russian: По тонкому льду, romanized: Po tonkomu ldu) is a 1966 Soviet spy film directed by Damir Vyatich-Berezhnykh, based on Georgiy Bryantsev's 1961 book, which provided the first authoritative public description of counterintelligence group GUKR (SMERSH).

The film tells the story of two NKVD agents who fight foreign spies in the Oryol Oblast before and during the Second World War.

== Plot ==
The film was created to commemorate the 50th anniversary of the Soviet Union's state security services.

The story focuses on the efforts of Soviet counterintelligence operatives in their battle against German espionage during the pre-war years and against German forces during the Great Patriotic War. At the heart of the film is the story of three counterintelligence agents—Bragin, Trapeznikov, and Bezrodny. In 1939, the trio begins tracking Colonel Dunkel, a German intelligence operative, but he manages to escape. With the outbreak of war, the agents are tasked with locating an enemy intelligence center and disrupting its operations. Their mission brings them face-to-face with Colonel Dunkel once again, ultimately resulting in his capture and successful transfer across the front lines.

== Release ==
On Thin Ice was released in the Soviet Union on 26 September 1966.

It was the highest-grossing film in the Soviet Union for 1966, with 42.5 million tickets sold.
