= Truffaldino from Bergamo =

1976 film by Vladimir Vorobyov

- Written by: Vladimir Vorobyov; Akiba Golburt
- Directed by: Vladimir Vorobyov
- Starring: Konstantin Raikin; Natalya Gundareva; Valentina Kosobutskaya
- Music by: Alexander Kolker
- Country of origin: Soviet Union
- Original language: Russian

Production
- Producer: Leonid Svetlov
- Cinematography: Dmitri Meskhiev
- Editor: Zinaida Scheineman
- Running time: 129 minutes
- Production company: Lenfilm

Original release
- Release: 1976

Truffaldino from Bergamo (Russian: Труффальдино из Бергамо, romanized: Truffaldino iz Bergamo) is a 1976 Soviet two-part television romantic comedy musical film directed by Vladimir Vorobyov, based on the play Servant of Two Masters by Italian writer Carlo Goldoni and featuring music by Alexander Kolker. The film follows a commedia dell'arte format around the quick-witted Harlequin Truffaldino as he is caught up in a love story between two Turinese fugitives in Venice.

== Plot ==
Federico Rasponi, a Turinese nobleman engaged to a young Venetian named Clarice, is killed with Florindo Aretusi, the lover of Federico's sister Beatrice Rasponi, as the prime suspect. Beatrice disguises herself as Federico to pursue Florindo to Venice as he flees the Turinese authorities, and she hires Truffaldino from Bergamo as a manservant after his slapstick antics help defeat a troupe of bandits. Beatrice visits Clarice's father Pantalone to retrieve Federico's funds, where it is revealed that with the news of Federico's death Clarice has instead been betrothed to her true love, Silvio Lombardy; Beatrice's arrival as Federico forces their wedding to be aborted and leads the humiliated Silvio to vow revenge against Federico, while Truffaldino is smitten with Pantalone's servant Smeradlina.

Truffaldino, always looking for an extra meal, claims to be unemployed and offers his services to Florindo for a second salary after Florindo and Beatrice book two neighboring rooms in the same inn with neither the wiser; Truffaldino's ploy constantly threatens to backfire as Pantalone and Silvio send him to deliver money and a threat respectively "to your master" without specifying which, while Florindo and Beatrice both send Truffaldino to the post office at the same time, resulting in Silvio informing Florindo of Federico's apparent survival and in Florindo learning of Beatrice's presence in Venice from one of her erroneously opened letters.

Beatrice attempts to comfort the heartbroken Clarice, eventually revealing her identity upon extracting a vow of silence, however when Clarice remains doubtful and Beatrice begins removing her shirt to prove her sex they are intruded upon by Pantalone, who mistakes the couple for being in love and proclaims their wedding to be the next day. Silvio's father Dr. Lombardy is badly slighted by Pantalone when he attempts to renegotiate his son's wedding, causing Silvio to break in and hold Pantalone at swordpoint. Beatrice intercedes, but the duel between her and Silvio is broken up by Clarice, whose inability to explain Beatrice's situation leads to Silvio renouncing her love; Clarice's attempted suicide is only barely stopped by Smeraldina while Silvio leaves in shame.

Truffaldino spends some time planning his masters' meals and flirting with Smeraldina, however when he attempts to launder both of their wardrobes at the same time Florindo and Beatrice end up recognizing each others' belongings, forcing Truffaldino to concoct an alibi about inheriting them from a previous master upon their death. Both Florindo and Beatrice are left believing the other to be dead, with Beatrice finally revealing her identity and allowing Pantalone to ecstatically offer Clarice's hand in marriage to Silvio once again. Beatrice prepares to commit suicide out of grief and is only stopped by Florindo after he hears her lament through the wall and the couple is finally reunited.

Clarice, Silvio, Beatrice, and Florindo are all paired off into their respective marriages, however Truffaldino's ploy causes a disagreement over whether Beatrice's or Florindo's servant should marry Smeraldina, forcing Truffaldino to finally reveal his deception. The Turinese guards that have been pursuing Florindo throughout the film are then defeated by the cast in a slapstick sequence, only for the captain to reveal he was actually there to produce a document clearing Florindo's name of Federico's murder.

== Cast ==
- Konstantin Raikin as Truffaldino, a servant of two masters who is in love with Smeraldina (voiced by Mikhail Boyarsky)
- Natalya Gundareva as Smeraldina, a servant in the house of Pantalone in love with Truffaldino (voiced by Elena Driatskaya)
- Valentina Kosobutskaya as Beatrice, sister of late Federico Rasponi (impersonating her brother) and lover of Florindo
- Victor Kostetskiy as Florindo Aretusi, fugitive from Turin and fiancé of Beatrice
- Elena Driatskaya as Clarice, daughter of Pantalone and betrothed of Silvio
- Victor Krivonos as Silvio, son of Dr. Lombardi and betrothed of Clarice
- Lev Petropavlovski as Pantalone, a Venetian banker and father of Clarice
- Igor Sorkin as Dr. Lombardi, the father of Silvio
- Alexander Bereznyak as Brighella, hotel owner and old friend of Rasponi siblings
- Yevgeny Tilicheev as a captain of Turin guards

== Production ==
Vladimir Vorobyov was the director of the Leningrad Musical Comedy Theatre, and most actors, with the exception of Konstantin Raikin and Natalya Gundareva were employed at his theatre.

The film was shot in Lenfilm pavilions, with some scenes filmed on the Gulf of Finland.

== Music ==
Part one

- "Performance"
- "Duet of Truffaldino and Beatrice"
- "Venice"
- "Song about a servant"
- "Truffaldino's song"
- "Silvio's song"
- "Florindo's song"
- "Clarice's song"
- "Silvio's song (reprise)"

Part two

- "Performance"
- "Silvio and Beatrice's duel"
- "Silvio's song (reprise)"
- "Truffaldino's song (reprise)"
- "Duet of Smeraldina and Truffaldino"
- "It will be midnight in Venice soon"
- "Beatrice's song"
- "Venice (reprise)"
