= Alexander Kolker =

Russian composer (1933–2023)

- Алекса́ндр Ко́лкер
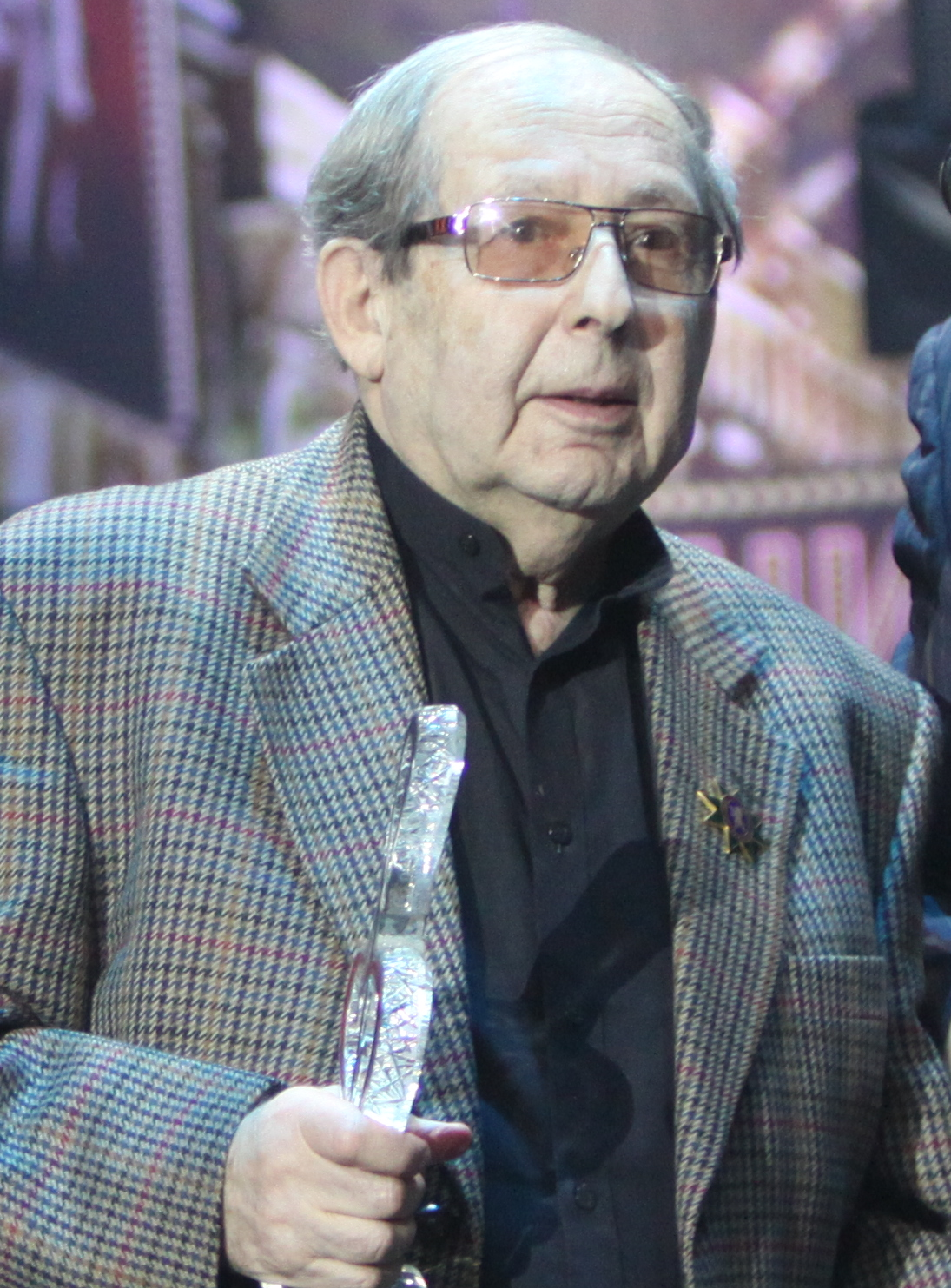
- Alexander Kolker in 2009
- Born: Alexander Naumovich Kolker; 28 July 1933; Leningrad, Russian SFSR, USSR
- Died: 1 August 2023 (aged 90); Saint Petersburg, Russia
- Education: Saint Petersburg Electrotechnical University
- Occupation: Music composer
- Years active: 1958–2023

Alexander Naumovich Kolker (Russian: Алекса́ндр Нау́мович Ко́лкер; 28 July 1933 – 1 August 2023) was a Soviet and Russian composer and Honored Artist of the RSFSR, awarded in 1981.

== Biography ==
Alexander Naumovich Kolker was born in Leningrad. He was evacuated from the city in 1942 and returned in 1944.

Since 1958 Alexander Kolker has worked as a professional composer.

He published a book of memoirs "The elevator does not lift you down" (in Russian: "Лифт вниз не поднимает") in 1998.

Alexander Kolker was married to singer Maria Pakhomenko until her death in 2013. Kolker died in Saint Petersburg on 1 August 2023, a few days after his 90th birthday.

== Filmography ==
- 1966 – We Fly to the Ocean
- 1966 – White Night
- 1967 – Private Life of Kuzyayev Valentin
- 1968 – Songs Address - Youth
- 1969 – Tomorrow, on April 3rd...
- 1969 – Singing Guitars
- 1970 – And People Need a Song So...
- 1970 – Magic Power
- 1971 – Shadowboxing
- 1971 – Singing by Maria Pakhomenko
- 1972 – The Last Days of Pompeii
- 1974 – Krechinsky's Wedding
- 1975 – Love Will Remain
- 1976 – Truffaldino from Bergamo
- 1978 – Leaving Go Away
- 1979 – Travel to Another City
- 1979 – Three Men in a Boat
- 1980 – Two-voice Melody
- 1981 – Three Short Stories about Love
- 1981 – Two Voices
- 1982 – No One Can Replace You
- 1989 – Death of Tarelkin

== Awards and honours ==
Kolker is Honored Artist of the RSFSR (1981) and winner of the Lenin Komsomol Prize (1968).

He was awarded the Musical Heart of the Theater Award (2009 - the nomination "Best Music", the play "The Viper" by the Novosibirsk Musical Theater; 2023 - the Grand Prix).

Kolker became an Honorary Citizen of the Republic of Karelia in 2009.
