= Private Life of Kuzyayev Valentin =

- Russian poster
- Russian: Личная жизнь Кузяева Валентина
- Directed by: Ilya Averbakh; Igor Maslennikov
- Written by: Natalya Ryazantseva
- Produced by: Vladimir Bezprozvanny
- Starring: Viktor Ilichyov; Tamara Konovalova; Avgust Baltrusaitis
- Cinematography: Boris Timkovsky
- Edited by: Vl. Mironov
- Music by: Alexander Kolker
- Production company: Lenfilm
- Release date: 1967
- Running time: 68 min.
- Country: Soviet Union
- Language: Russian

Private Life of Kuzyayev Valentin (Russian: Личная жизнь Кузяева Валентина, romanized: Lichnaya zhizn Kuzyaeva Valentina) is a 1967 Soviet drama film directed by Ilya Averbakh and Igor Maslennikov.

== Plot ==
High school student Valentin Kuzyaev is randomly stopped in a Leningrad street and invited to shoot a TV show about youth. For preparation, he is given a questionnaire. The questions in the questionnaire are the simplest, but it is difficult for Vale to answer them. To understand himself, he begins to keep a diary.

== Cast ==
- Viktor Ilichyov as Valentin Kuzyaev
- Irina Tereshenkova as TV presenter
- Avgust Baltrusaitis as Vladimir
- Vladislav Bogach as episode
- Anatoliy Yegorov as Valentin Kuzyaev's friend
- Tamara Konovalova as Margarita
- Zoya Krasnova as Zoya
- Georgy Shtil as Pyotr Kuzyaev
- Maria Pakhomenko as cameo

== Production ==
Ilya Averbakh directed the short stories Out and Daddy, and the short story Kuzya and Margarita was shot by Igor Maslennikov.
