= Life Is Full of Fun =

- Russian: Жизнь забавами полна
- Directed by: Pyotr Todorovsky
- Written by: Oleg Danilov
- Starring: Lyudmila Arinina; Vladimir Kashpur; Mariya Krasnikova; Yury Kuznetsov; Roman Madyanov
- Cinematography: Vladimir Shevtsik
- Release date: 2001
- Country: Russia
- Language: Russian

Life Is Full of Fun (Russian: Жизнь забавами полна, romanized: Zhizn zabavami polna) is a 2001 Russian drama film directed by Pyotr Todorovsky.

== Plot ==
The film takes place in a city near Moscow in a large communal apartment in which several families live, each of which has its own interests, troubles and joys, but their fates are associated with terrifying events taking place in the country.

== Cast ==
- Lyudmila Arinina
- Vladimir Kashpur
- Mariya Krasnikova
- Yury Kuznetsov
- Roman Madyanov
- Marina Mogilevskaya
- Nelli Nevedina
- Andrey Panin
- Elena Polyakova
- Irina Rozanova
- Vladimir Simonov
- Larisa Udovichenko
