= The Evening Labyrinth =

- Russian: Вечерний лабиринт
- Directed by: Boris Bushmelev
- Written by: Georgy Nikolaev
- Starring: Vladimir Basov; Viktor Ilichyov; Tatyana Vasileva; Aleksandr Lazarev; Valentina Talyzina
- Cinematography: Mark Dyatlov
- Music by: Georgiy Garanyan
- Release date: 1980
- Running time: 75 minute
- Country: Soviet Union
- Language: Russian

The Evening Labyrinth (Russian: Вечерний лабиринт) was a 1980 Soviet comedy film directed by Boris Bushmelev.

== Plot ==
The film tells about a creative team that decides to open an attraction in one of the regional cities and sends a few employees there to find out how best to do it. Arriving there, they settle in a hotel and face a lot of problems.

== Cast ==
- Vladimir Basov
- Viktor Ilichyov as Alekseyev
- Tatyana Vasileva as Eleonora
- Aleksandr Lazarev
- Valentina Talyzina
- Nikolay Parfyonov as Cloakroom attendant
- Tatyana Novitskaya
- Aleksandr Pashutin
- Georgiy Svetlani
- Mikhail Kokshenov
