= Alexey Eybozhenko =

Soviet actor (1934–1980)

- Born: 6 February 1934; Moscow, RSFSR, USSR
- Died: 26 December 1980 (aged 46); Moscow, RSFSR, USSR
- Occupation: Actor
- Years active: 1957—1980

Alexey Sergeevich Eybozhenko (Russian: Алексей Сергеевич Эйбоже́нко; 6 February 1934 — 26 December 1980) was a Soviet film and theater actor. He both was born in and died in Moscow.

This actor is best known for his role in the mini-series For the Rest of His Life, a film about Commissioner Danilov. It was based on the novel by Vera Panova, Satellites.

== Early life ==
Alexey Eybozhenko was born in Moscow and became an orphan, when he was 7 years old. His father was deceased in the Great Patriotic War, in the Battle of Kursk. And soon his mother died, supposedly because of her grief.

== Career ==
In 1957, he graduated from the Mikhail Shchepkin Higher Theatre School. Soon after, he transferred to the Koltsov Drama Theatre in Voronezh. He worked there for two years, and then moved to Moscow again to work at the Taganka Theatre. In 1964, he was accepted into the Mayakovsky Theatre. Three years later, he moved to the Maly Theatre, where he served until his death and played more than 20 roles.

== Death ==
Alexey Eybozhenko died of hypertension 26 December 1980. He was buried at the Vagankovo Cemetery at the 58th site, next to his father-in-law, Vladimir Kenigson.

== Selected filmography ==
- A Simple Story as secretary (1960)
- The Third Half as Lemeshko (1962)
- Silence as episode (1963)
- On Thin Ice as Andrey Trapeznikov (1966)
- I Was Nineteen as Sascha Ziganjuk (1968)
- Seventeen Moments of Spring as Husmann (1973)
- For the Rest of His Life as Commissar Danilov (1975)
- Trust as Nikolai Krylenko (1975)
