= Gleb Strizhenov =

Soviet stage and film actor

- Strizhenov in 1974
- Born: Gleb Aleksandrovich Strizhenov; July 21, 1925; Voronezh, Soviet Union
- Died: October 4, 1985 (aged 60); Moscow, Soviet Union
- Occupation: Actor
- Years active: 1957–1984
- Spouse: Lydia Antonova
- Children: 1

Gleb Aleksandrovich Strizhenov (Russian: Глеб Александрович Стриженов) (July 21, 1925 – October 4, 1985) was a Soviet stage and film actor. Honored Artist of the RSFSR (1974). He was the older brother of Oleg Strizhenov, who was also an actor.

== Selected filmography ==
- The Third Half (1963) as Yevgeny Ryazantsev
- An Optimistic Tragedy (1963) as officer
- The Red and the White (1967) as Colonel
- Earth and Sky Adventures (1974) as Stas' Father
- For the Rest of His Life (1975) as Kravtsov
- Okovani soferi (1975) as Kalenic
- The Days of the Turbins (1976, TV Movie) as von Schratt
- The Tavern on Pyatnitskaya (1978) as Gremin
- The Garage (1980) as Yakubov
- A Few Days from the Life of I. I. Oblomov (1980) as The Baron
- Per Aspera Ad Astra (1981) as Glan
- Teheran 43 (1981) as Simon
