= Per Aspera Ad Astra (1981 film) =

1981 Soviet film directed by Richard Viktorov

- Theatrical release poster
- Directed by: Richard Viktorovru; Nikolai Viktorov (restored version)
- Written by: Richard Viktorov (screenplay); Kir Bulychov (novel)
- Produced by: Aleksandr Kazachkov; Yuri Obukhov; Sandy Frank (English language version producer)
- Cinematography: Aleksandr Rybin; Sandor Berkesi (restored version)
- Edited by: Lyubov Pushkina (ed.); Konstantin Zagorsky (production design)
- Music by: Alexey Rybnikov (original score); Sergei Skripka (conductor)
- Distributed by: Gorky Film Studio; Goskino (restored version); M-Film (restored version)
- Release dates: 1981; 2001 (restored version)
- Running time: 148 minutes 123 minutes (restored version)
- Country: Soviet Union
- Language: Russian

Per Aspera Ad Astra (Russian: Через тернии к звёздам; U. S. title: Through the Thorns to the Stars; Humanoid Woman) is a 1981 Soviet science fiction film directed by Richard Viktorov and based on a novel by Kir Bulychov.

== Plot ==
In the 23rd century, the starship Pushkin discovers a derelict alien spaceship of unknown origin. The alien craft's crew are identical humanoids created by an advanced cloning process. Most are dead, but one woman is found in a catatonic state. The leader of the mission, Professor Sergei Lebedev, brings her to Earth. He settles her in his house and names her Neeya. (Note: Or Niyya, or many alternate spellings.)

Neeya suffers from memory loss and cannot recall anything of her past. As she adapts to life on Earth, she discovers she has a variety of telekinetic powers. A friend of Lebedev, Prof. Nadezhda Ivanova, begins studying Neeya's neurophysiology and finds a special neurocenter in her brain that can be triggered remotely. Neeya is visiting the beach with Lebedev's son Stepan when Ivanova triggers the system. Neeya loses control of her body and falls into the water. The device also triggers a clear memory of her home planet, where she sees a man explain the purpose of the control system, giving him control over the clones. The flashback ends when Stepan pulls her from the water.

Neeya joins an archaeological expedition, where she has another flashback that reveals she is from the planet Dessa. She returns from the expedition to find that a diplomatic mission from Dessa has just arrived at the spaceport to ask for help from Earth. She learns they will return to Dessa on the Astra, and stows away on the ship. By chance, both Stepan and Prof. Ivanova are also aboard.

The Astra encounters Neeya's ship, identified by the Deesan diplomats as the Gaya. A transmitter for the neuro-command system has been left on, forcing Neeya to teleport aboard without a spacesuit. She manages to disable the signal before passing out, and is rescued by Stepan. One of the diplomats, Rakan, explains that the Gaya was the last ship to leave Dessa. Aboard was Professor Glan, who was building an army of clones and awaiting a signal from rebel forces on the planet that the time was right to return and take over.

The Astra reaches Dessa to find a planet that has been stripped of all minerals, leaving the air and water poisoned. Life on the surface is only possible due to Turanchoks, who runs a gas mask factory out of Glan's former Institute. Turanchoks is unhappy with the presence of the Earth ship, which has the power to clean up the mess and put him out of business. After the humans successfully test a way to clean the air, he poisons the only remaining water supply and blames it on them, inciting a riot. Due to Neeya's intervention, the plan is not wholly successful.

Turanchoks activates one of Glan's control devices and uses it to force Neeya to place a bomb on the Astra. Rakan attempts to stop him, but is stabbed by one of Turanchoks' agents. Near death, Rakan crawls off and releases Glan's last and most deadly experiment, a blob-like mass which begins killing everyone in the lab, including Turanchoks. Outside, Ivanova attempts to take the bomb from Neeya, but is shot by Turanchoks' agent. The shock of her death breaks the control's effect on Neeya. Neeya's powers, aided by the remaining crew of the Astra and the ship's robot, defeat the monster. The Astra leaves for home, leaving Neeya behind on a mended planet.

== Variant cuts ==
A heavily-edited English-dubbed version titled Humanoid Woman was featured in the 11th episode of Mystery Science Theater 3000 during the KTMA era of the show. This version had nearly an hour of footage removed by the distributors and abbreviated credits with Anglicized names to obscure its Soviet origin.

On December 27, 2001, a new restoration directed by Nikolai Viktorov, son of the original film's director, was released as the 20th anniversary edition. The release featured revised special effects by the Paradox company and an all-new soundtrack in Dolby Digital. This incarnation was cut by 25 minutes in order to speed up plot development and to excise Soviet ideological context.

== Cast ==
- Yelena Metyolkina as Neeya
- Uldis Lieldidžs as Sergei Lebedev
- Vadim Ledogorov as Cadet Stepan Lebedev
- Yelena Fadeyeva as Maria Pavlovna
- Vatslav Dvorzhetsky as Petr Petrovich
- Nadezhda Sementsova as Professor Nadezhda Ivanova
- Aleksandr Lazarev as Professor Klimov
- Aleksandr Mikhailov as Dreier
- Boris Shcherbakov as Navigator Kolotin
- Igor Ledogorov as Ambassador Rakan
- Igor Yasulovich as Torki
- Gleb Strizhenov as Glan
- Vladimir Fyodorov as Turanchoks
- Yevgeni Karelskikh

== Dubbing ==
Country	Company	Air date	Title
United States	International Film Exchange, Celebrity Video Presentations	1982–1987	Per Aspera Ad Astra
Italy	Canale 5, Rai Fiction	1984, 2009	Per Aspera Ad Astra
France	France 2	1995	À travers les ronces vers les étoiles
Japan	Toho, Fuji TV, TBS	1994, 2008	星にとげスルー
Spain	Telecinco, TVE	1995, 2006	A través de las espinas a las estrellas
South Korea	MBC	2010	별빛으로 가시를 통해
Czech Republic	ČT1	2012	Skrze utrpení ke hvězdám
Croatia	Hrvatska radiotelevizija	2013	Kroz teškoća do zvijezda
Greece	Alter Channel	2009	Κορίτσι-ρομπότ
Sweden	TV4	2004	Stjärnklar prinsessa Niya
