= Fathers and Grandfathers =

- Russian: Отцы и деды
- Directed by: Yuri Yegorov
- Written by: Arkady Inin; Yuri Yegorov
- Produced by: Mikhail Sapozhnikov
- Starring: Anatoliy Papanov; Valentin Smirnitskiy; Aleksey Yasulovich; Galina Polskikh; Lyudmila Arinina
- Cinematography: Aleksandr Kovalchuk
- Edited by: Yanina Bogolepova
- Music by: Mark Fradkin
- Production company: Gorky Film Studio
- Release date: 1982
- Running time: 83 min.
- Country: Soviet Union
- Language: Russian

Fathers and Grandfathers (Russian: Отцы и деды, romanized: Ottsy i dedy) is a 1982 Soviet romantic comedy film directed by Yuri Yegorov.

The film tells about the full energy of a pensioner who decides to prove to everyone that his life has just begun.

== Plot ==
Lukov Senior (played by Anatoly Papanov) is an energetic and lively man nearing retirement, but his family—an adult son (Valentin Smirnitsky), a determined daughter-in-law (Galina Polskikh), and a growing grandson (Aleksei Yasulovich)—all insist on casting him in the role of the elderly patriarch who should sit back and relax, accepting his place as an "old man" watching life from the sidelines.

Unwilling to accept this fate, Lukov Senior is determined to prove that his life is far from over and that he still has plenty of vigor and spirit. When he hints at the idea of remarrying, however, his son, supported by his wife and son, firmly objects, claiming marriage is a reckless move for someone of his age. Fueled by this opposition, Lukov sets out to show his family—and himself—that he is still capable of living fully, making bold decisions, and, if he so chooses, even getting married again.

== Cast ==
- Anatoliy Papanov as grandfather
- Valentin Smirnitskiy as gather
- Aleksey Yasulovich as grandson (as Alyosha Yasulovich)
- Galina Polskikh as Lyudmila
- Lyudmila Arinina as Popova
- Lidiya Kuznetsova as Natasha
- Yevgeni Lazarev as Nikolay
- Nikolay Trofimov as Semyon Ilyich
- Vadim Andreev as Mikhail
- Nikolay Merzlikin as Viktor
