= Earth and Sky Adventures =

- Directed by: Igor Vetrov
- Written by: Yuri Parkhomenko
- Starring: Elena Plyuiko; Anatoly Mateshko
- Cinematography: Aleksandr Pischikov
- Music by: Ivan Karabyts
- Production company: Dovzhenko Film Studios
- Release date: 1974
- Running time: 68 minutes
- Country: Soviet Union
- Language: Russian

Earth and Sky Adventures (Russian: Земные и небесные приключения, romanized: Zemnye i nebesnye priklucheniya) is a 1974 Soviet children's film directed by Igor Vetrov.

== Plot ==
Komsomol organizer of 9 "B" class Galya offers classmates to go to the village during the summer holidays where an abandoned aerodrome is located. Almost all the children support Galya. They dream of building a glider with their own hands and flying on it. Stas ridicules this idea and many agree with him,. he and his friends go to the village to relax. Stas meets Tanya, a girl from a neighboring village. He really likes her, but Tanya dreams of the sky. She wants Galya and her friends to take her to into their company. Galya's father, pilot Nikolai Stepanovich, accidentally learns about the interest of the boys.

He understands that children endanger their lives, they need the help of adults. He appeals to the general designer of the aircraft factory to help the children organize a glider group. He is ready to become an instructor. the leadership of the aircraft factory is meeting schoolchildren, promising to provide the necessary equipment. Nikolai Stepanovich collects all the children and talks about creating a glider circle and invites them to become its members. Conditions include a strict regime, study, living in the territory of the aerodrome in tents. Everyone says yes and Stas remains alone. Children build a glider and fly on it. Stas understands that any serious business can be done only together, asks the guys for forgiveness. They take him into their collective.

== Cast ==
- Elena Plyuiko - Galya, komsomol organizer of 9 "B" class
- Anatoly Mateshko - Stas
- Elizaveta Dedova - Tanya
- Valery Provotorov - Alesha
- Sergey Grando - Borya
- Sergey Masloboyshchikov - Roma
- Alexander Dudogo - Sasha
- Lydia Ivashchenko - Lida
- Mikhail Gluzsky - Semyon Ivanovich Zhuk
- Laimonas Noreika - Nikolai Stepanovich, father of Galya
- Gleb Strizhenov - father of Stas
- Galina Dolgozvyaga - mother of Galya
- Nikolai Lebedev - General Designer
