= Ruslan and Ludmila (film) =

1972 film by Aleksandr Ptushko

- DVD cover
- Directed by: Aleksandr Ptushko
- Written by: Aleksandr Ptushko; Samuil Bolotin (poetic dialogs); Alexander Pushkin (original poem)
- Produced by: Arkady Ashkinazi
- Starring: Valeri Kozinets; Natalya Petrova; Andrei Abrikosov; Vladimir Fyodorov; Vyacheslav Nevinny
- Cinematography: Igor Geleyn; Valentin Zakharov
- Music by: Tikhon Khrennikov
- Distributed by: Mosfilm
- Release date: 1972
- Running time: 85 minutes
- Country: Soviet Union
- Language: Russian

Ruslan and Ludmila (Russian: «Руслан и Людмила») is a 1972 film directed by Aleksandr Ptushko. It is based on the 1820 poem of the same name written by Alexander Pushkin.

It is the last of the many fairytale films Ptushko directed, and, according to film critics, the most successful. Ptushko died a year after this film was released.

The hero of the movie is the bogatyr Ruslan who sets off in search of his kidnapped bride, Ludmila. To rescue his beloved, he will have to overcome many obstacles, and battle the sorcerers Chernomor and Naina.

== Plot ==
=== Episode 1 ===
In the palace of Prince Vladimir of Kiev, a feast is underway—his beloved daughter Lyudmila is marrying the hero Ruslan, who previously saved Kiev from the Pechenegs. All are celebrating except for three of Ruslan's rivals: Rogdai, Farlaf, and Ratmir. After the feast, Ruslan and Lyudmila are alone in their room when suddenly, an unknown force bursts through the window and abducts Lyudmila. Grief-stricken, Ruslan informs Vladimir and his guests. Furious, the prince blames Ruslan for failing to protect his daughter, declaring that he will give Lyudmila's hand to whoever finds and brings her back to the palace. Ruslan's rivals also set out to search for her.

On his journey, Ruslan encounters an old hermit named Finn, who reveals that Lyudmila was taken by the evil sorcerer Chernomor and warns Ruslan of the sorcerer's tricks. Finn also shares his own story: in his youth, he tried to win the love of a beautiful young woman named Naina, who was indifferent to him. He turned to sorcery to enchant her, and the spell worked, but by then 40 years had passed since their last encounter, and Naina had become an unattractive old witch. Now spurned by Finn, Naina became his bitter rival.

Ruslan continues his quest and encounters Rogdai. They engage in a deadly battle, ending in Rogdai's defeat as Ruslan throws him into the Dnieper River.

Meanwhile, Lyudmila is imprisoned in Chernomor's palace, surrounded by riches and cold beauty, but none of it brings her joy. She longs to escape. Chernomor tries to win her favor, but one day, Lyudmila finds his invisibility cap, which she uses to hide from him and his servants, adding a little solace to her bleak days.

On the battlefield, Ruslan encounters a giant, disembodied head, which mocks him at first but, impressed by his bravery, shares its story. Once, it was a mighty warrior and Chernomor's elder brother. After they fell out, Chernomor severed his head in his sleep and forced him to guard a magical sword. The warrior's head gives the sword to Ruslan, urging him to take vengeance on Chernomor and revealing that the sorcerer's power resides in his beard.

=== Episode 2 ===
Ruslan journeys further but faces traps set by Naina and Chernomor, who conspire to lead him astray with deadly encounters, including a tiger and other dark creatures. Naina even transforms herself into Lyudmila's double.

Chernomor deceives Lyudmila by disguising himself as a wounded Ruslan. She falls into his trap, and the sorcerer puts her to sleep, hiding her with the invisibility cap so no one can find her.

Despite these challenges, Ruslan reaches the palace and confronts Chernomor, cutting off the sorcerer's long beard. Stripped of his powers, Chernomor is defeated. Ruslan finds the sleeping Lyudmila but is unable to awaken her. After failing to get answers from Chernomor, Ruslan binds him and sets off back home with both Lyudmila and the captured sorcerer. Along the way, Ruslan meets Ratmir, his former rival, who has become a fisherman and found happiness with a new lover.

Meanwhile, Naina finds Farlaf, who has spent his time idly in his village rather than searching for Lyudmila. She convinces Farlaf to kill Ruslan, promising that he will then be hailed as a hero and marry Lyudmila. The cowardly Farlaf agrees and murders Ruslan that night. He takes Lyudmila to the prince's palace. Vladimir is overjoyed to see his daughter, but her mysterious, unending sleep saddens him. Farlaf, unable to explain her state, fabricates tales of his supposed heroic efforts to rescue her.

Finn finds Ruslan's lifeless body, reviving him first with dead water, then with living water. Upon awakening, Ruslan discovers Lyudmila is gone and hurries to Kiev, receiving a magical ring from Finn to help him awaken her. Meanwhile, Vladimir's servants are also attempting, in vain, to wake Lyudmila.

Soon, the Pechenegs attack Kiev again. Ruslan arrives in the city, fights alongside other Kiev warriors, and they emerge victorious. Returning to the palace as heroes, Ruslan uses the magical ring to awaken Lyudmila, to the joy of Prince Vladimir and the horror of Farlaf, whose deception is now exposed. Farlaf is expelled in disgrace, and the prince joyfully gives his daughter to Ruslan once again. Chernomor, now powerless, is appointed as the court jester. Finally, Ruslan and Lyudmila's wedding takes place.

== Cast ==
- Valeri Kozinets as Ruslan (voiced by Feliks Yavorsky)
- Natalya Petrova as Lyudmila (voiced by Nina Gulyaeva)
- Vladimir Fyodorov as Chernomor the Wizard (voiced by Valery Nosik)
- Maria Kapnist as Naina the Witch (as Maria Kapnist-Serko)
- Andrei Abrikosov as Vladimir
- Igor Yasulovich as Finn
- Vyacheslav Nevinny as Farlaf
- Oleg Mokshantsev as Rogdai
- Ruslan Akhmetov as Ratmir
- Sergey Martinson as Ambassador
- Eve Kivi as fisherwoman
- Valery Nosik as messenger

== Awards ==
- 1976 — the International film festival of children's and youthful movies in Salerno (Italy) — a special award of jury

== The edition on video ==
In 1990 in the USSR the movie is released on VHS by the film association "Krupnyy Plan".
