= Vladimir Fyodorov (actor) =

Soviet and Russian actor and physicist (1939–2021)

- Влади́мир Анато́льевич Фёдоров
- Born: Vladimir Anatolyevich Fyodorov; 19 February 1939; Moscow, RSFSR, Soviet Union
- Died: 18 May 2021 (aged 82); Moscow, Russia
- Occupations: Actor and physicist

Vladimir Anatolyevich Fyodorov (Russian: Влади́мир Анато́льевич Фёдоров; 19 February 1939 — 18 May 2021) was a Soviet and Russian actor and physicist.

== Biography ==
In 1964, Fyodorov graduated from the National Research Nuclear University MEPhI and he joined the Institute of Biophysics, USSR Ministry of Health. Vladimir Fyodorov's profession was nuclear physicist and he was the author of more than 50 scientific works and inventions. Many of his works have been translated into English. He was a student of Igor Kurchatov.

== Career ==
Fyodorov first appeared on the screen at the age of 32, when film director Aleksandr Ptushko invited the young scientist to play the role of the villain Chernomor in the film Ruslan and Lyudmila. Since then, Vladimir Fyodorov portrayed many characters with dwarfism, thanks to his small stature 130 cm (4 ft 3¼ inch) . The best-known film works include the aforementioned Chernomor and the villain and oligarch Turanchoks of the sci-fi movie Per Aspera Ad Astra.

In the late 1980s, Vladimir Fyodorov came on the professional scene and played in the productions of the Vakhtangov Theater. Since 1993, he has been an actor at Nikitsky Gate.

From 1997 to 1998 Fyodorov was a co-presenter and assistant to Leonid Yarmolnik in the game show Gold Rush.

== Personal life ==
Fyodorov was married to the actress Vera for 35 years.

In recent years, he had heart disease; in 2016 he had a stroke. He died on 18 May 2021.

== Filmography ==
- 1972 — Ruslan and Lyudmila as Chernomor
- 1975 — To Fear Sadness Means to Never See Happiness as servant
- 1976 — The Legend of Thiele as jester
- 1976 — The Twelve Chairs as thief
- 1977 — Rings of Almanzor as pirate
- 1977 — Nose as dwarf
- 1979 — The Wild Hunt King Stach as Basil
- 1980 — Per Aspera Ad Astra as Turanchoks
- 1980 — At the Beginning of Glorious Days as dwarf
- 1980 — The Youth of Peter the Great as jester
- 1982 — The House That Swift Built as a dwarf with a gun
- 1983 — The Comic Lover, or Love Venture of Sir John Falstaff as Jean-Claude
- 1983 — Evenings on a Farm near Dikanka as dwarf
- 1985 — The Black Arrow as dwarf
- 1985 — After the Rain, on Thursday as werewolf
- 1986 — Kin-dza-dza! as alien in yellow pants
- 1987 — The End of Eternity as dwarf
- 1988 — New Adventures of a Yankee in King Arthur's Court as dwarf
- 1988 — One, Two — A Grief Is Not A Trouble! as Suleymanchik
- 1989 — Souvenir for the Public Prosecutor as dwarf
- 1994 — Hagi-Tragger as killer
- 1997 — All What We Have Long Dreamed of as dwarf in a German prison
- 1999 — Two Nabokovs as Frederick Dobson
- 2002 — House of Fools as Karlusha
- 2008 — Plus One as episode
- 2009 — Anna Karenina as switchman
- 2011 — Once Upon a Time There Lived a Simple Woman as whacky
- 2013 — Bombila. Continued as gravedigger Giant
