= The Scarlet Flower (1977 film) =

- Russian: Аленький цветочек
- Directed by: Irina Povolotskaya
- Written by: Sergey Aksakov; Natalya Ryazantseva
- Produced by: Ivan Morozov
- Starring: Marina Ilyichyova; Lev Durov; Alla Demidova; Aleksey Chernov; Aleksandr Abdulov
- Cinematography: Aleksandr Antipenko
- Edited by: G. Sadovnikova
- Music by: Edison Denisov
- Production company: Gorky Film Studio
- Release date: 1977
- Running time: 65 min.
- Country: Soviet Union
- Language: Russian

The Scarlet Flower (Russian: Аленький цветочек, romanized: Alenkiy tsvetochek) is a 1977 Soviet children's fantasy film directed by Irina Povolotskaya based on the fairy-tale of the same name by Sergey Aksakov.

A merchant is about to go on a trip and promises to bring his daughters the gifts they want. His two older daughters wished for beautiful fabrics, and the youngest wanted the scarlet flower, which she dreamed about.

== Plot ==
A merchant prepares for a journey to distant lands and asks his three daughters what gifts they would like him to bring back. The two elder daughters request expensive dresses and jewelry, while the youngest, Alyonushka, asks for a rare and beautiful scarlet flower, unlike any other in the world. In search of this flower, the loving father arrives on a sparsely populated island (with only three inhabitants), where he finds the desired flower. When he picks it, however, he incurs the wrath of its owner—a forest beast. Upon hearing the reason for his action, the beast takes pity on him but decrees that the merchant must remain as a prisoner on the island. The merchant asks to say goodbye to his daughters, and when it is time to return, Alyonushka, through cleverness, takes the enchanted ring from her father and travels to the island herself.

On the island, there is only a forest, a lake, and a grand palace, inhabited by a mysterious and wise woman living in seclusion, along with an honest yet grumbling old butler. Both recall a distant life "with masquerades and fireworks," and the butler often hints that it was the woman who cast a spell on their young prince. Alyonushka is moved by the tragic mystery of the wise hermitess and the care of the kindly butler, and she stays in the palace. She also grows closer to the island's master—a moss-covered beast with a kind heart and a sensitive soul. They fall in love. Despite the elder woman's advice to flee, Alyonushka decides to leave only temporarily to visit her father and sisters. Her sisters attempt to keep her at home, but she returns to the island and frees her beloved from the curse. He is, in fact, a prince and the ruler of the land. The hermitess leaves with her cherished peacock and turtle, accompanied by the butler, who declares that he will stay with her until "a good heart returns to her."

== Cast ==
- Marina Ilyichyova as Alyona
- Lev Durov as Merchant
- Alla Demidova as Auberin
- Aleksey Chernov as Old Man
- Aleksandr Abdulov as Prince
- Valery Garkalin as a guy in the village (uncredited)
- Olga Korytkovskaya as Arina
- Yelena Vodolazova as Akulina
- Valentin Gneushev as Yegorka
- Dmitri Pokrovsky as guard (uncredited)

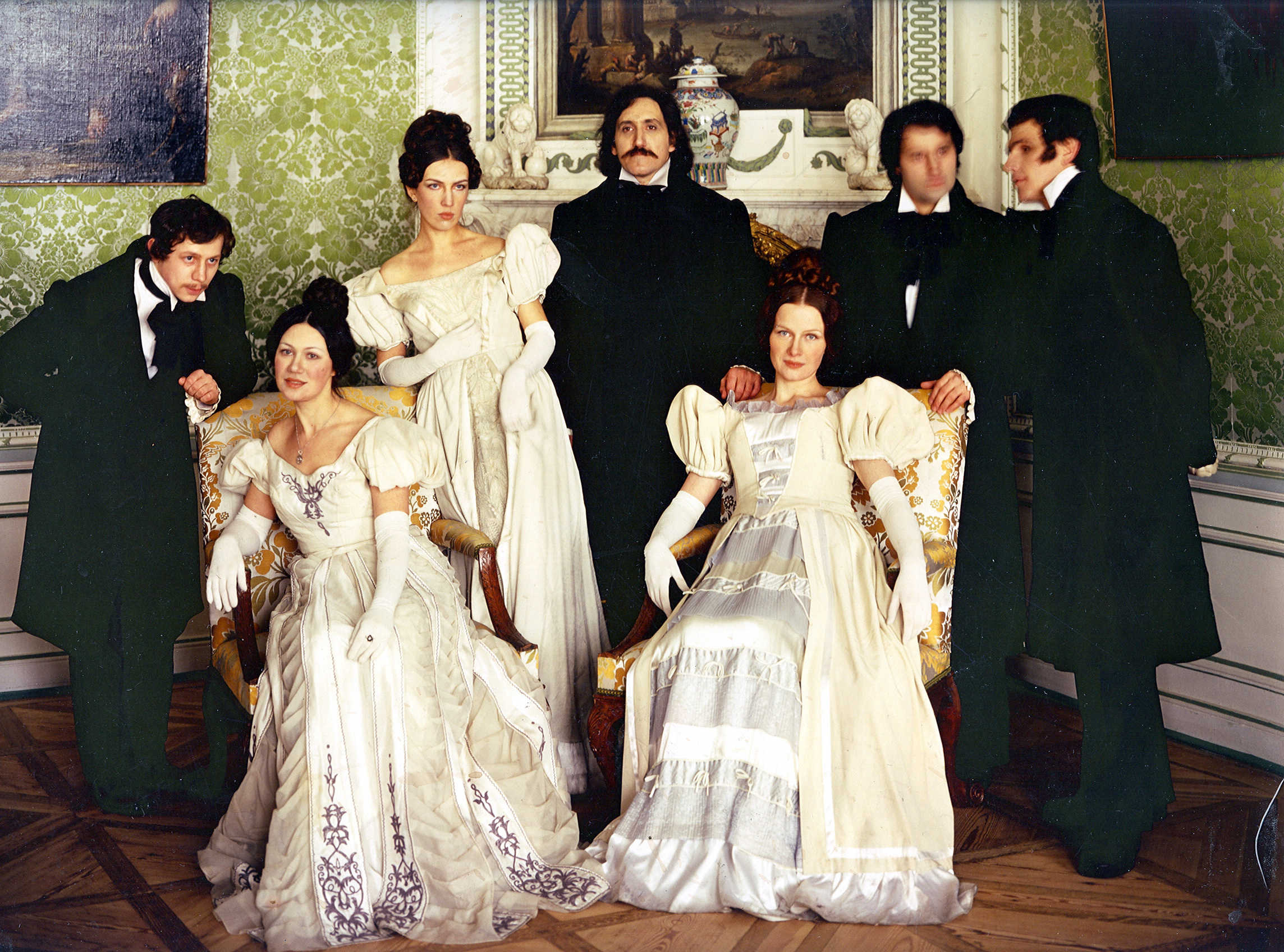
Still from the film
