= Monologue (film) =

1972 film

- Original Spanish film poster
- Directed by: Ilya Averbakh
- Written by: Yevgeni Gabrilovich
- Starring: Mikhail Gluzsky; Margarita Terekhova; Marina Neyolova; Stanislav Lyubshin
- Cinematography: Dmitri Meskhiyev
- Edited by: Ye. Makhankova
- Music by: Oleg Karavaychuk
- Release date: 1973
- Running time: 100 minutes
- Country: Soviet Union
- Language: Russian

Monologue (Russian: Монолог, romanized: Monolog) is a 1973 Soviet drama film directed by Ilya Averbakh. It was entered into the 1973 Cannes Film Festival, where it was nominated for the Palme d'Or.

== Cast ==
- Mikhail Gluzsky as Professor Sretensky
- Margarita Terekhova as Tasya, Sretensky's daughter
- Marina Neyolova as Nina, Sretensky's granddaughter
- Stanislav Lyubshin as Konstantin 'Samson' Kotikov
- Yevgeniya Khanayeva as Elsa Ivanovna (voiced by Irina Gubanova)
- Leonid Gallis as Govornin, curator
- Leonid Nevedomsky as Oleg
- Valeri Matveyev as Dima
- Ernst Romanov as Vadim
- Alla Pugacheva vocal (In the performance of Alla Pugacheva, sounds song from the repertoire of Joan Baez "Te Ador" in Portuguese, recorded specially for the film during the time work singer's in the jazz orchestra under the guidance of Oleg Lundstrem).
