= Ossen =

- Commune
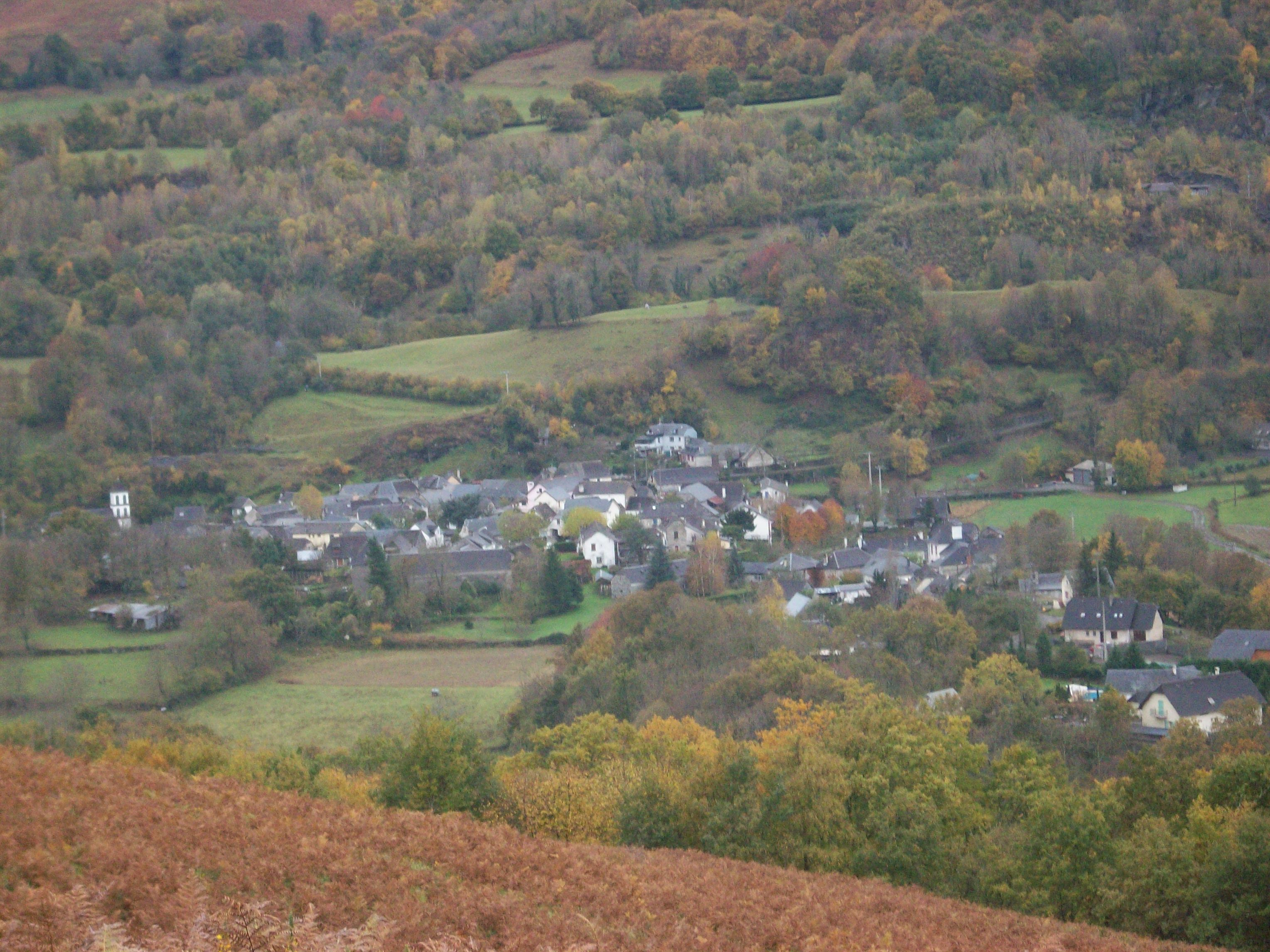
- A view from the nearby hillside

- Coat of arms
- Location of Ossen
- Location within France Location within Occitanie
- Coordinates: 43°04′17″N 0°03′56″W
- Country: France
- Region: Occitania
- Department: Hautes-Pyrénées
- Arrondissement: Argelès-Gazost
- Canton: Lourdes-1
- Intercommunality: CA Tarbes-Lourdes-Pyrénées

Government
  - Mayor (2020–2026): Christine Abbadie Chelle
- Area^{1}: 6.91 km^{2} (2.67 sq mi)
- Elevation: 508 m (1,667 ft)
- Highest elevation: 1,418 m (4,652 ft)
- Lowest elevation: 430 m (1,410 ft)
- Population (2023): 240
  - Density: 35/km^{2} (90/sq mi)
- Time zone: UTC+01:00 (CET)
  - Summer (DST): UTC+02:00 (CEST)
- INSEE/Postal code: 65343 /65100
- ^{1} French Land Register data, which excludes lakes, ponds, glaciers > 1 km^{2} (0.386 sq mi or 247 acres) and river estuaries.

Ossen (French pronunciation: [ɔsɛ̃]; Occitan: Aussen) is a commune in the Hautes-Pyrénées department in south-western France.

== See also ==
- Communes of the Hautes-Pyrénées department
