= Valeri Kozinets =

- Born: May 9, 1939; USSR
- Died: November 8, 2020 (aged 81); Saint Petersburg, Russia
- Occupations: Actor, screenwriter

Valeri Yevseevich Kozinets (May 9, 1939 – November 8, 2020) was a Soviet and Russian stage and film actor and screenwriter.

== Biography ==
In the 1960s, Kozinets was an actor at the Moscow Yermolova Theatre. From 1971 to 1977, he was an actor at Mosfilm. In 1977, he joined Lenfilm.

In 1972, he starred in the main role of Ruslan in the film adaptation of the poem by A. Pushkin “Ruslan and Lyudmila”, directed by Alexander Ptushko.

Valeri Kozinets died in Saint Petersburg on November 8, 2020, at the age of 81.

== Selected filmography ==
=== Actor ===
- 1968 – Spartacus in Razbudite Mukhina
- 1972 – Ruslan in Ruslan and Ludmila
- 1976 – Aleksey Antonov in 72 gradusa nizhe nulya
- 1982 – A pirate in Treasure Island
- 1991 – Savely in Get Thee Out

=== Screenwriter ===
- 2011 – We declare war on you (miniseries)
