= Konstantin Raikin =

Russian actor and theatre director

- Константин Райкин
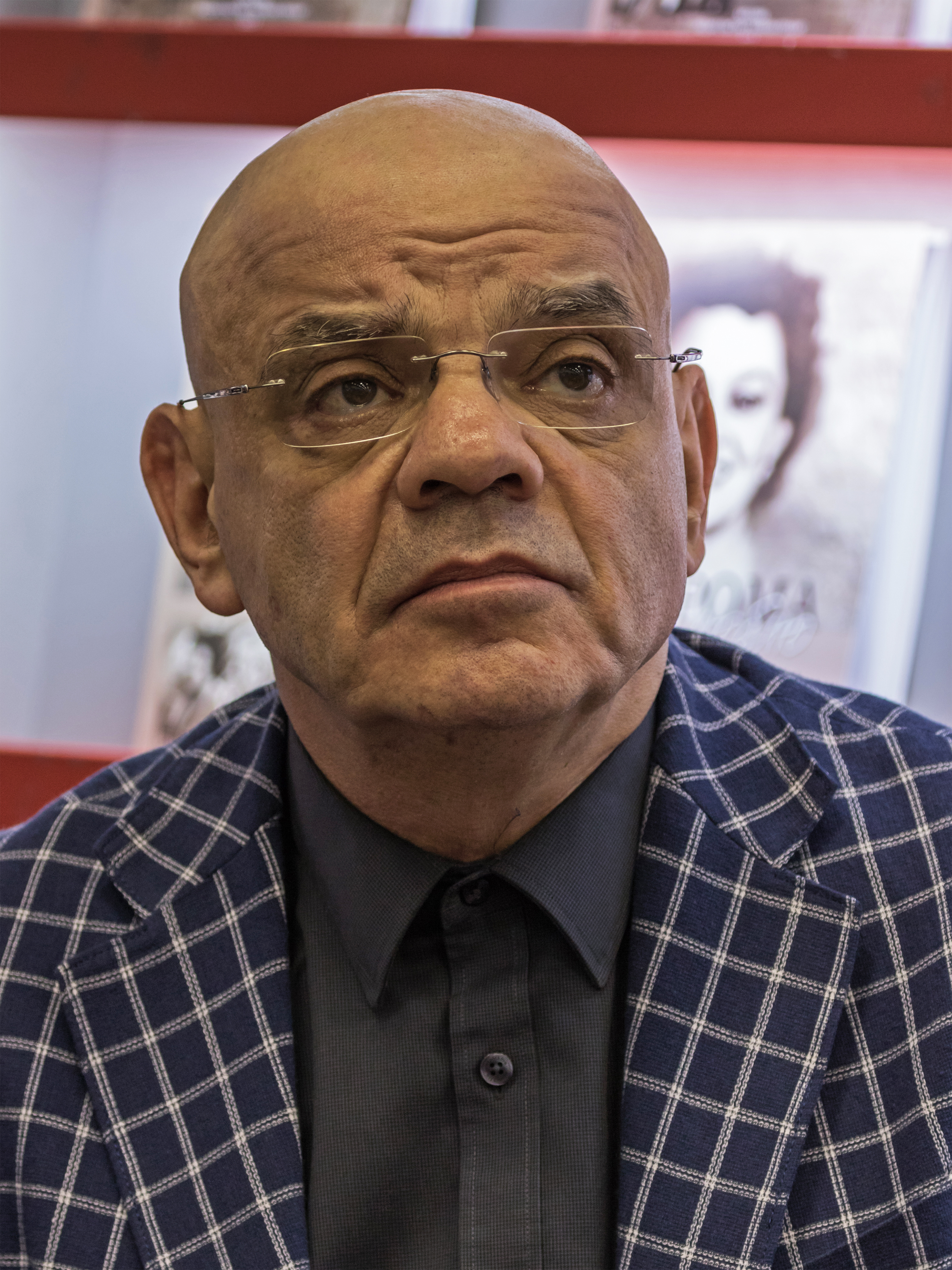
- Raikin in 2017
- Born: Konstantin Arkadyevich Raikin; 8 July 1950 (age 76); Leningrad, Soviet Union
- Education: The Schukin Theater college
- Occupations: Actor, director
- Years active: 1969–present
- Spouse: Yelena Butenko
- Children: Polina Raikina

Konstantin Arkadyevich Raikin (Russian: Константи́н Арка́дьевич Ра́йкин; July 8, 1950) is a Russian actor and theatre director, the head of the Moscow Satyricon Theatre (since 1988). Konstantin Raikin has been honoured with the titles Meritorious Artist of Russia (1985) and the People's Artist of Russia (1993). Among his accolades are the Russian State Prize (1995), the Order "For Merit to the Fatherland" (III, IV – 2000, 2010) and the Golden Mask award (1995, 2000, 2005, 2008). He is the son of Arkady Raikin, the legendary Soviet actor and stand-up comedian.

== Biography ==
=== Early life and education ===
Konstantin Raikin was born July 8, 1950, in Leningrad in the family of People's Artist of the USSR Arkady Raikin and actress Ruth Raikina-Ioffe (Roma).

Konstantin studied at the Physics and Mathematics School for gifted children at the Leningrad University. He studied in a class with a biological major, and all his free time he spent at the Leningrad Zoo, where he cleaned after the animals. At the end of the school, he even intended to enter the Faculty of Biology of Leningrad University, but after the final exams he decided to enter the theater school.

In 1967 he entered the Boris Shchukin Theatre Institute and was enrolled in the course of Yuri Katin-Yartsev.

=== Theatre career ===
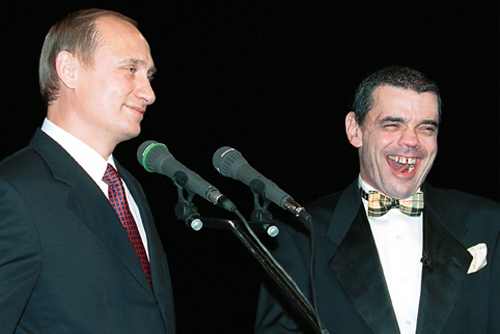
Vladimir Putin with Konstantin Raykin at his 50th birthday at Satyricon Theatre

After graduation in 1971, Raikin was invited by Galina Volchek to the Sovremennik Theatre, where he worked for 10 years, having played 38 roles during this time, including 15 main ones. Among them: Valentine - Valentine and Valentine by Mikhail Roshchin, David - As Brother to Brother by Jane Reib, From Lopatin's Notes by Konstantin Simonov, Sir Andrew Etjuchik - Twelfth Night, Hamlet - Etudes for Hamlet by William Shakespeare, Jean Jacques Bouton - The Cabal of Hypocrites by Mikhail Bulgakov and others.

In 1981, Raikin moved to the Leningrad Theater of Miniatures under the leadership of Arkady Raikin. In 1982 the theater moved to Moscow and became the State Theater of Miniatures (in 1987 it was renamed as the Moscow Theater "Satyricon"). During this period, together with his father, he played the plays His Majesty the Theater (1981) and Peace to Your Home (1984). In the play Faces by Mikhail Mishin, Raikin not only performed the main role, but also acted as a choreographer.

In 1985, he played his author's program Come on, actor! ..

In 1988, after the death of Arkady Raikin, the artistic direction of the theater "Satyricon" passed to Raikin. In the same year, the play The Maids by Jean Genet appeared in the theater of Roman Viktyuk, which became an event in the theatrical life of the capital. The performance was a huge success, among the numerous prizes received by The Maids at international festivals was the award for the virtuosity of the acting performance awarded to the actors (BITEF Festival, 1990).

In the early 1990s Raikin acted in the plays staged by director Leonid Trushkin, the role of George in the play Ibid, Then ..., Slade at the Anton Chekhov Theater and Cyrano in the play Cyrano de Bergerac by Rostand (co-production of "Satyricon" and Anton Chekhov Theater).

In 1994, he played the role of poet and madman Bruno in the play The Magnificent Cuckold by Fernand Crommelynck staged by Peter Fomenko. For this role, Raikin was awarded the State Prize of the Russian Federation in the field of literature and art in 1995, and the Association of Cultural Figures "Muses of Freedom" handed Raikin the Crystal Turandot Award for the best male role.

In 1995, the premiere of the play The Metamorphosis by Franz Kafka directed by Valery Fokin (together with the Creative Center named after Vsevolod Meyerhold), in which Raikin played the role of Gregor Zamza. For this work, he was awarded the national theater prize of the Union of theatrical figures of the Russian Federation Golden Mask.

In 1996, Raikin played the role of Mack the Knife in Bertolt Brecht's The Threepenny Opera (directed by Vladimir Mashkov). His next actor's work was the role of Jacques in the play "Jacques and His Lord" by Milan Kundera. For this work Raikin was awarded the Stanislavsky Prize and the "Kumir" Prize.

In 1998 Raikin played the main role in the play Hamlet by Shakespeare, staged by the famous Georgian director Robert Sturua. This work was crowned with great success by the audience and theatrical criticism. In the summer of 1999 the performance was shown in the framework of the theatrical project "Hamlet-2000" in Plovdiv (Bulgaria).

In 2000 occurred the premiere of the solo performance of Raikin Der Kontrabaß by Patrick Süskind, the work in which brought the actor a second "Golden Mask".

In 2002, Raikin played the main role in the play Signor Todero Host based on the play by Carlo Goldoni, staged by Robert Sturua, for which he was awarded the Stanislavsky Prize at the Moscow Premiere.

In 2004, in "Satyricon" Raikin played the role of Richard in the play Richard III by Shakespeare in the production of St. Petersburg director Yuri Butusov, for which he received the third "Golden Mask" (nomination "the best male role").

This was followed by works in the plays Cosmetic Enemy directed by Roman Kozak (the role of Textor Texel), King Lear by Yuri Butusov (Lear), for this work the actor was awarded the fourth National Theater Prize "Golden Mask", It's Not All Shrovetide for the Cat (the role of Ermil Zotych Ahov), and others.

Raikin works a lot in "Satyricon" as a director. He staged the plays Hercules and Augean Stables (together with Shkolnik, 1988), Mowgli (1990), Such Free Butterflies (1993), Romeo and Juliet (1995), Chioggino skirmishes (1997), The Quartet (1999), Chauntecleer (2001), The Land of Love (2004), Funny Money (2005), The Queen of Beauty (2007), The Lonely West (2007), The Blue Monster (2008), Profitable place (2003, 2009), Poplars and the Wind (2009), Money (2010).

=== Film career ===
Konstantin Raikin made his cinematic debut in 1969 with a very small role in the film "Tomorrow, April 3rd ...", based on Zverev's stories, then there was a small role for the ship's cook in the military film Commander of the Lucky "Pike".

Fame for the actor came after the release in 1974 of the first Soviet western At Home Among Strangers by director Nikita Mikhalkov, in which he played the role of Tatar Kayum.

He was widely known for his roles in the films Much Ado about Nothing (directed by Samson Samsonov, 1971), Truffaldino from Bergamo (TV, directed by Vladimir Vorobyov, 1976), Island of Lost Ships, (TV, director Eugene Ginzburg, 1988 ), Shadow, or Maybe everything will be fine (TV, director Mikhail Kozakov, 1990).

In addition to these films, Raikin starred in the films Comedy about Lysistratus, Rouen Maiden nicknamed Pyshka, Russian ragtime, Shooting Angels, Simple-minded. In 2001, he played the role of Poirot in the television movie Poirot's Error, based on Agatha Christie's novel The Murder of Roger Ackroyd (directed by Sergei Ursulyak).

=== Teaching ===
Since 2001, Konstantin Arkadevich has been heading the course at the Moscow Art Theater School (professor at the Moscow Art Theater School). In 2005, the first graduating students of the acting faculty - the Raikin course - took place. The diploma performance "Country of Love" based on the play "The Snow Maiden" by Alexei Ostrovsky became a calling card of young artists. He entered the theater's repertoire. With these young artists Raikin staged the play "ABC of the Artist", a class concert with the subtitle "So We Learned", in which he himself took part.

In 2009, the second issue of the students of his course was held. Several artists of this release also joined the theater's troupe.

August 1, 2010, under the guidance of People's Artist of Russia Konstantin Raikin in Karlovy Vary (Czech Republic) opens the International School of Russian Theater.

Since 1975 Raikin is a member of the Union of Theater Workers of Russia.

Since 2001, he has been a member of the Presidential Council for Culture and Art.

=== Honors ===
The activity of Konstantin Raikin is marked by many professional and state awards.

In 1985 he was awarded the title of Honored Artist of the Russian Federation.

In 1992 he was awarded the title of People's Artist of Russia.

He is a laureate of the State Prizes of the Russian Federation (1995, 2002) in the field of literature and art, a laureate of theater awards: the Prize of the Association of Cultural Figures "Muses of Freedom" "Crystal Turandot" (1995), the International Stanislavsky Prize (1998) business circles "Kumir" (1999), the Prize of the Foundation. Stanislavsky "Moscow premiere" (2002), the theatrical prize "Seagull" in the nomination "Mask of Zorro" for the role of Richard III, the Triumph Award (2008), four times laureate of the National Theater Award of the Union of Theatrical Figures of the Russian Federation Golden Mask (1995, 2000, 2003, 2008).

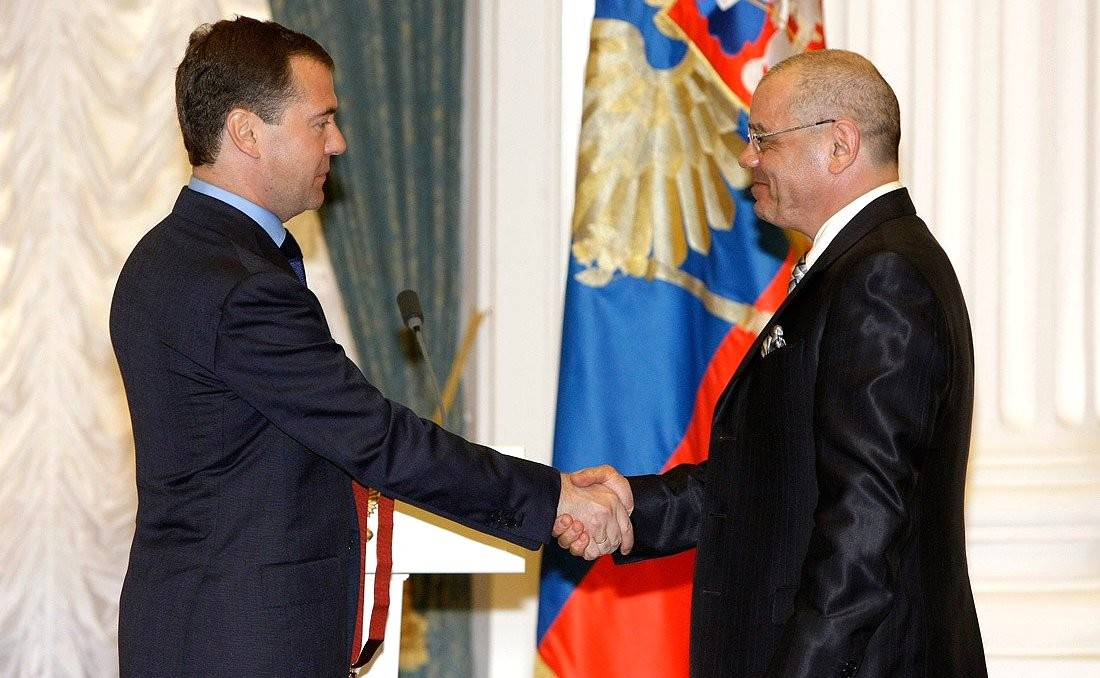
Dmitry Medvedev awarded Order "For Merit to the Fatherland" of the 3rd degree, 26 July 2010

Konstantin Raikin was awarded the Order "For Merit to the Fatherland" of the IV degree (2000).

== Filmography ==
- Commander of the Lucky "Pike" (1972)
- Much Ado About Nothing (1973)
- At Home Among Strangers (1974)
- Truffaldino from Bergamo (1976)
- Island of Lost Ships (1987)
