= Oleg Karavaychuk =

Russian composer

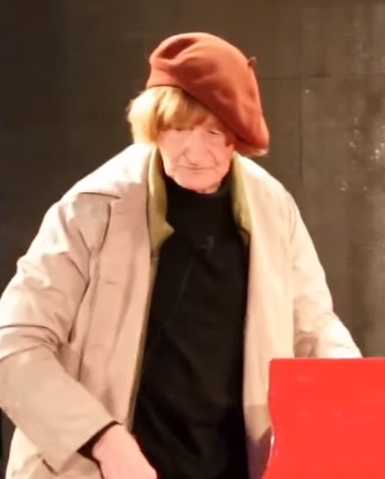
Oleg Karavaychuk in August 2015

Oleg Nikolayevich Karavaychuk (Russian: Оле́г Никола́евич Каравайчу́к; 28 December 1927 – 13 June 2016) was a Soviet and Russian composer, author of music for many films and theater performances.

== Biography ==
Karavaychuk was born on 28 December 1927 in Kyiv, into the family of a violinist who was arrested when Oleg was two years old. From early childhood, he composed music.

He attended the School of Music at the Leningrad State Conservatory where he was under mentorship from Dmitri Shostakovich and Sviatoslav Richter, from which he graduated in 1945. In March 1943, he took part in a concert of young musicians in celebration of the 80th anniversary of the Conservatory in Tashkent. From 1945 to 1951 he studied at the Leningrad State Conservatory piano class (teacher Samarii Savshinsky).

Since 1953 he wrote music for films, although he claims that he began in movie industry because it was the only work which was not prohibited by the KGB.

For years Karavaychuk lived on the 15th Line of Vasilyevsky Island with his mother, in the house between the Sredny and Maly Prospects, close to the park named after Vera Slutskaya. Locals often saw him on the street and in nearby stores. With his extravagant appearance and behavior (manner of walking and stay, to deal with saleswomen, sunglasses, and a long mane of hair) Oleg Karavaychuk earned the nickname "mad composer" and was, therefore, a local landmark.

Oleg Karavaychuk collaborated with Sergei Parajanov, Vasily Shukshin, Ilya Averbakh, Kira Muratova (Brief Encounters, The Long Goodbye) and others. Karavaychuk also collaborated with the avant-garde, in particular Sergey Kuryokhin.

Oleg Nikolayevich Karavaychuk died on 13 June 2016 in St. Petersburg.
