= Mikhail Gluzsky =

Soviet actor

- Михаил Глузский
- Born: November 20, 1918 [O.S. November 7] Kyiv, Ukrainian State
- Died: June 15, 2001 (aged 82); Moscow, Russia
- Resting place: Vagankovo Cemetery
- Occupation: Actor
- Years active: 1939–2001

Mikhail Andreyevich Gluzsky (Note: Russian: Михаил Андреевич Глузский, romanized: Mikhail Andreyevich Gluzsky) (November 20, 1918 [O.S. November 7] – June 15, 2001) was a Soviet and Russian theater and film actor. He starred in the 1972 film, Monologue, which was entered into the 1973 Cannes Film Festival. An actor in more than 130 films between his film debut in 1939 and his death in 2001, he was named a People's Artist of the USSR in 1983.

== Biography ==
Mikhail Andreyevich Gluzsky was born in Kyiv in 1918, in the short-lived Ukrainian State. He worked at a factory before World War II and made his film debut as a Mosfilm acting studio student, appearing in diverse episodic roles in Grigori Roshal's The Oppenheim Family, Konstantin Yudin's A Girl with a Temper, and Vsevolod Pudovkin's Minin and Pozharsky in 1939. He graduated from the studio in 1940 and joined the troupe of the Central Theater of the Red Army, fought as a soldier in World War II, and worked in Moscow after his discharge. His prolific career in film reached its height during the post-war period.

Gluzsky often appeared in the role of a headstrong leader but also successfully took on the depiction of reflective intellectuals. Awarded the title of honor of People's Artist of the USSR in 1983, he headed the acting workshop of the All-Union State Institute of Cinematography from 1988 to 1996.

One of the most recognizable faces of Soviet and Russian cinema, Mikhail Gluzsky continued to work as an actor even amid the economic crisis of the 1990s, which hit Boris Yeltsin's Russia hard and affected the film industry harshly. He appeared in more than 130 roles between his debut in 1939 and his death in 2001. He died in Moscow at the age of eighty-two.

== Selected filmography ==
- The Oppenheim Family (1939)
- A Girl with a Temper (1939)
- Minin and Pozharsky (1939)
- The Village Teacher (1947)
- Mysterious Discovery (1953)
- And Quiet Flows the Don (1958)
- The Alive and the Dead (1964)
- The Big Ore (1964)
- On Thin Ice (1966)
- Kidnapping, Caucasian Style (1966)
- No Path Through Fire (1968)
- I Was Nineteen (1968)
- Liberation (1970)
- Monologue (1972)
- As Ilf and Petrov rode a tram (1972)
- Earth and Sky Adventures (1974)
- Unbelievable Adventures of Italians in Russia (1974)
- An Almost Funny Story (1977)
- Territory (1978)
- TASS Is Authorized to Declare... (1984)
- The Kreutzer Sonata (1987)
- Desyat Negrityat (1987)
- Entrance to the Labyrinth (1989)

== Honours and awards ==
- 1973 — Vasilyev Brothers State Prize of the RSFSR for the role of Ivan Stepanovich in the movie A Soldier Came Back from the Front (1971)
- 1975 — awarded the Dovzhenko silver medal for the film Flame
- 1983 — People's Artist of the USSR
- 1998 — Prize of the business community, "Idol" for outstanding contribution to cinema
- Order "For Merit to the Fatherland", 3rd class (16 November 1998) for outstanding contribution to the development of national art
- Order of the Red Banner of Labour (1989)
- Nika Award, twice:
  - 1997 — for the film The Man for Young Women
  - 1999 — in the honour and dignity
