= Ilya Averbakh =

Soviet film director, screenwriter (1934–1986)

Ilya Aleksandrovich Averbakh (Russian: Илья́ Алекса́ндрович Аверба́х; July 28, 1934, in Leningrad – January 11, 1986, in Moscow) was a Soviet film director. His 1972 film, Monologue, was entered into the 1973 Cannes Film Festival.

Averbakh was awarded the title Honoured Worker of the Arts Industry of the RSFSR in 1976. His wife, screenwriter Natalia Riazantseva, wrote the scripts for several of his films. In 2003, Andrei Kravchuk made a documentary about the director.

== Life and career ==
Averbakh graduated from Leningrad Medical Institute in 1958 and practiced as a doctor before enrolling in Goskino’s Advanced Screenwriting Courses, where he studied with Evgeni Gabrilovich until 1964. He joined the Supreme Courses for Screenwriters and Directors (affiliated with Lenfilm Studio), which he completed in 1967; one of his teachers was Grigori Kozintsev.

His solo feature directorial debut, Degree of Risk (1968), based on the 1965 book The Thoughts and the Heart by cardiologist Nikolai Amosov, is about an intense interaction between an old surgeon and a young patient whose life is saved against all odds.

Monologue (1972) is about a reclusive scientist who has to confront changing realities when living with his daughter and granddaughter.

Other People’s Letters (1975) depicts the difficult relations between an idealistic provincial teacher and her cynical students. Averbakh’s last film, The Voice (1982) was about a young actress who has a terminal illness and desperately tries to define the meaning of her creative efforts.

He was married to the screenwriter Natalya Ryazantseva.

== Filmography ==
- Private Life of Kuzyayev Valentin (1967)
- Degree of Risk (1968)
- Drama from Ancient Life (1971)
- Monologue (1972)
- Other People's Letters (1976)
- A Declaration of Love (1977)
- The Voice (1982)
