= Kapnist =

Kapnist is a surname associated with the Russian noble Kapnist family of Greek origin. Notable people with the surname include:

- Maria Kapnist (1913–1993), Soviet actress
- Pyotr Kapnist (1839–1904) Russian diplomat
- Vasily Kapnist (1758–1823), Russian poet
