= Kortik =

Kortik (Ко́ртик) may be

- the Russian for naval dirk
- a nickname for Kashtan CIWS, a weapons system of the Russian navy
- a 1948 children's book by Anatoly Rybakov, translated into English as The Dirk
- Kortik (1954 film), an adaptation of Rybakov's book, by Vladimir Vengerov and Michael Schweitzer
- Kortik (1973 film), an adaptation of Rybakov's book for TV by Nikolai Kalinin
