= Ukrainian Greeks =

Ethnic group in Ukraine

Greeks in Ukraine греки (hreky)
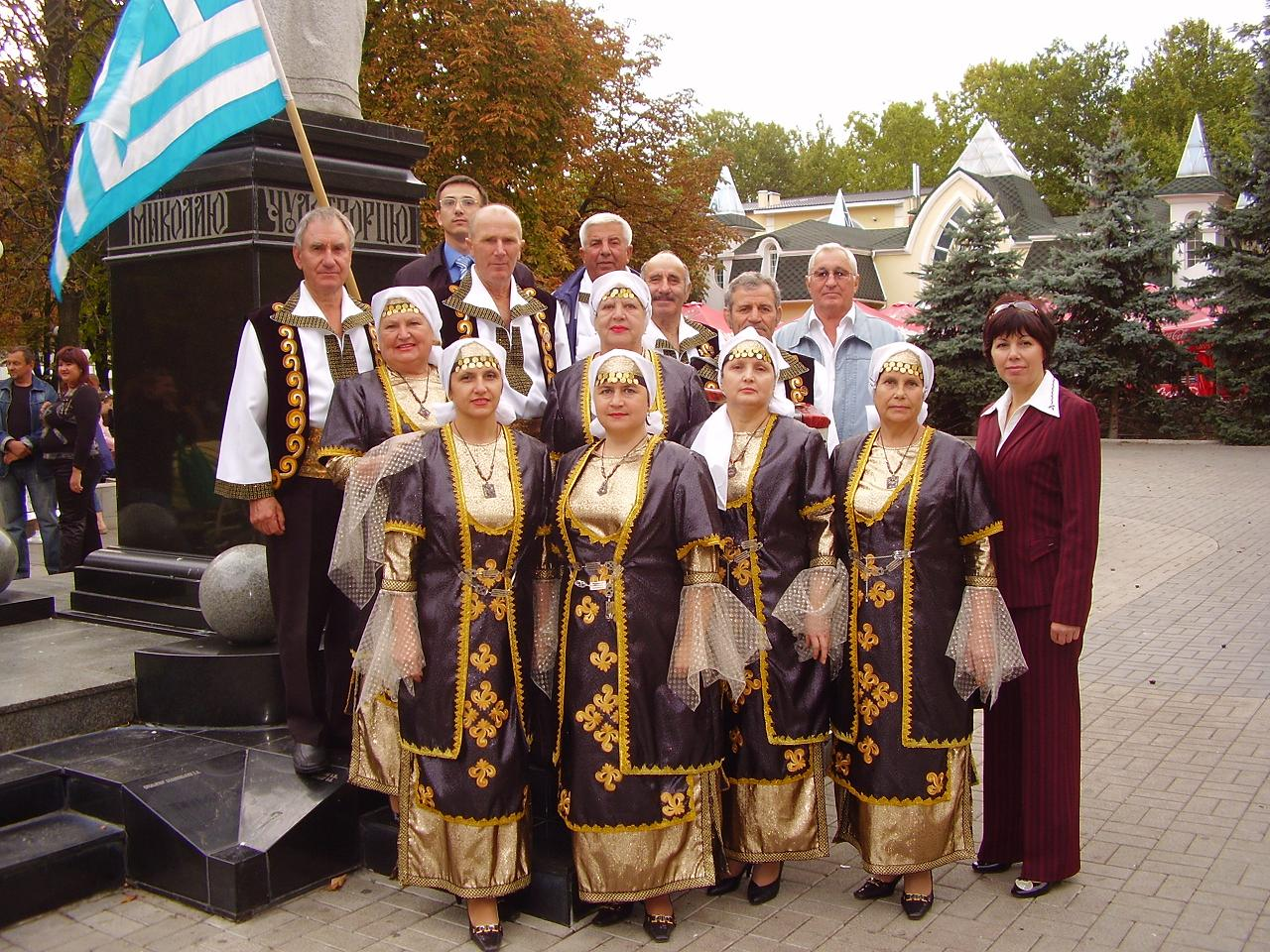
- Greeks in Ukraine

Total population
- 91,548 (2001)

Regions with significant populations
- Donetsk Oblast: 77,516 (2001)
- Crimea: 2,795 (2001)
- Zaporizhzhia Oblast: 2,179 (2001)
- Odesa Oblast: 2,083 (2001)
- The rest: 6,975 (2001)

Languages
- Russian (88.5%), Modern Koine Greek, Ukrainian, Urum, Mariupol Greek

Religion
- Orthodox Christianity

Related ethnic groups
- Other Greeks, especially Pontic Greeks, Northern Greeks (including Macedonian Greeks) and Caucasus Greeks; other traditionally Crimean Tatar-speaking peoples, including Crimean Tatars, Crimean Karaites, Krymchaks, Crimean Roma, and Crimean Armenians

Ukrainian Greeks are a Greek minority that reside in or used to reside in the territory of modern Ukraine. The majority of Ukrainian Greeks live in Donetsk Oblast and are particularly concentrated around the city of Mariupol.

According to the 2001 Ukrainian Census, there were 91,548 ethnic Greeks in Ukraine, or 0.2% of the population. However, the actual percentage of those with Greek ancestry is likely to be much higher due to widespread intermarriage between ethnic Greeks and those Ukrainian citizens who are Ukrainian Orthodox, particularly in eastern Ukraine, as well as the absence of strong links to Greece or use of the Greek language by many with Greek ancestry in these areas and who therefore are not classified as Greeks in official censuses.

Most Greeks in Ukraine belong to the larger Greek diaspora known as Pontic Greeks. But there are also a small recent group of Greek expats and immigrants to Ukraine.

Greek colonies of the Northern Black Sea, 8th - 3rd century BCE

== History ==
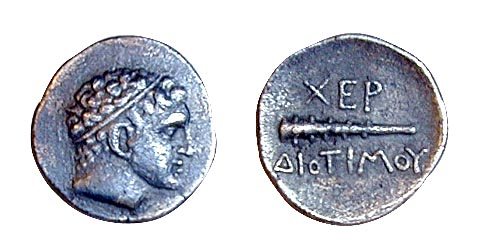
Greek Coin from Chersonesos in Crimea depicting Diotimus 2nd century BCE. (Odesa Numismatics Museum)

A Greek presence throughout the Black Sea area existed long before the beginnings of Kyivan Rus'. For most of their history in this area, the history of the Greeks in Russia and in Ukraine forms a single narrative, of which a division according to present-day boundaries would be an artificial anachronism. Most present-day Greeks in Ukraine are the descendants of Pontic Greeks from the Pontus region between the fall of the Empire of Trebizond in 1461 and the Russo-Turkish War of 1828–1829.

=== Ancient Greek colonies (6th century BCE–1st century BCE) ===
Greeks established colonies on what are now the Ukrainian shores of the Black Sea as early as the 7th century CE. The most important of those early Greek settlements in the area were Borysthenes, Olbia and Tyras on the northern Black Sea coast, as well as Panticapaeum in Crimea. The colonies traded with various ancient nations around the Black Sea, including Scythians, Maeotae, Cimmerians, Goths and predecessors of the Slavs. Their main export goods were ceramics, weapons, jewelry, oil and wine, which were exchanged for grain, slaves, fish, skins and fur. These earlier Greek communities had, however, assimilated into the wider, indigenous population of the region.

=== Greek-speaking kingdoms in Crimea (4th century BCE–15th century CE) ===
The Greek colonies coalesced into the Bosporan Kingdom in the 4th century BCE, which lasted as a Roman client state until the 4th century CE. Additionally, the Kingdom of Pontus was founded in the 3rd century BCE and controlled territory in Ukraine (including the Bosporan Kingdom) until its acquisition by the Roman Empire in the 1st century CE. During the 4th century CE most of those colonies were destroyed by Huns.

After the 13th century Cuman and Mongol-Tatar Golden Horde invasion of the steppes of southern Ukraine and Russia to the north, Greeks had remained only in the towns on the southern slopes of the Crimean Mountains and became divided into two sub-groups: Tatar-speaking Urums and Rumaiic Pontic Greeks with Rumeíka Greek as their mother tongue.

The Crimean Principality of Theodoro gained independence from the Empire of Trebizond in the early 14th century and lasted until its conquest by the Ottoman Empire in the 15th century.

=== Medieval and Early Modern era ===
During the 9th century the Rus' established trade connections with the Byzantine Empire. Following the adoption of Christianity, Greeks achieved significant cultural influence in the territories of modern Ukraine. Religious and economic ties were preserved after the dissolution of Kyivan Rus'.

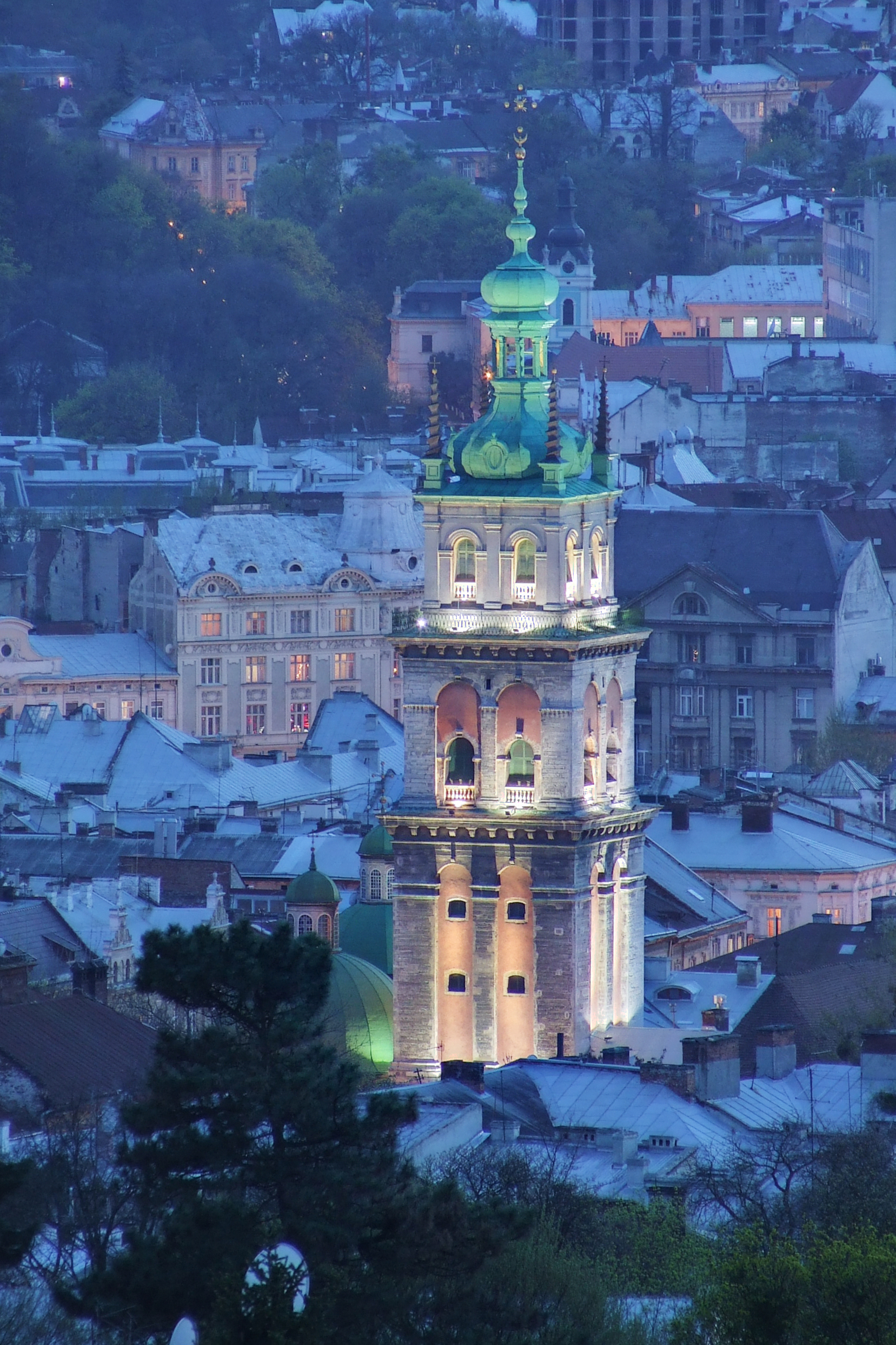
Korniakt's Tower in Lviv built by Greek merchant Konstantinos Korniaktos in 1578

Starting from the late 16th century, many Greek merchants settled in major cities of today's Ukraine, including Lviv and Kamianets-Podilskyi. The new settlers played an important role in the activities of Orthodox brotherhoods and contributed to the development of schooling. Among notable Greek scholars active in Ukrainian lands during that time were Arsenius of Elason and Cyril Lucaris. Studies of Greek language and literature were also promoted by local figures such as Lavrentiy Zyzaniy, Kyrylo Stavrovetsky, Meletius Smotrytsky and Zacharias Kopystensky. Greeks monks from the Athos Monastery served as counsellors of prince Konstanty Wasyl Ostrogski, the founder of Ostroh Academy.

During the early 17th century the Patriarchate of Constantinople established ties with Ukrainian Cossacks, and many Greeks entered the service of Cossack Hetmanate, eventually becoming part of its social elite. Among notable Cossack families of Greek origin were the Kapnists, Levytskys and several other families. In 1657 a group of Greek merchants received a privilege from Cossack hetman Bohdan Khmelnytsky, which allowed them to settle in the city of Nizhyn and organize trade fairs. Many Greeks also lived in the town of Pereiaslav and in Kyiv, where a Greek monastery was established. Under Russian rule cultural and religious ties with the Greek world were supported by the Kyiv Mohyla Academy and its successor, the Kiev Theological Academy.

=== Ottoman Empire refugees (15th century–19th century) ===
The Greeks of present-day Ukraine are mainly the descendants of various waves of especially Pontic Greek refugees and "economic migrants" who left the region of Pontus and the Pontic Alps in northeastern Anatolia between the fall of the Empire of Trebizond in 1461 and the Russo-Turkish War of 1828–1829, although some had settled in Ukraine in the late-19th or early-20th centuries. Following the Russo-Turkish Wars, many noble Greek families from Moldavia and Wallachia received protection from the tsarist authorities and received landholdings: for example, the Cantacuzino family was provided large amounts of land near Zolotonosha, Romny and Voznesensk, meanwhile the Ypsilantis family was granted territories in Chernigov Governorate.

=== Russian conquest (18th and 19th centuries) ===
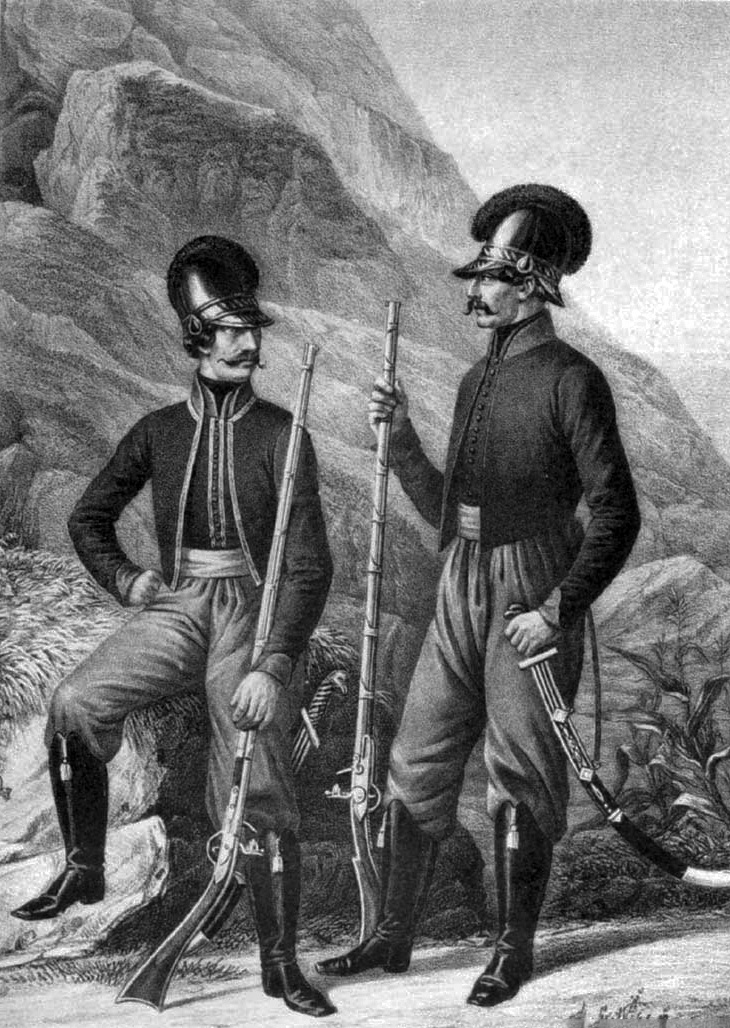
Non-commissioned officers and men of the Greek Balaklava Infantry battalion, 1797-1830

The Urums and Rumaiic Pontic Greeks lived among the Crimean Tatars until the Russo-Ottoman War of 1768-1774. In advance to the Annexation of Crimea by the Russian Empire in 1783, Catherine the Great relocated numerous Pontic Greeks from Crimea to the northern shores of the Sea of Azov, in an event known as the Emigration of Christians from Crimea. New territory was assigned for them between today's cities of Mariupol and Donetsk, covering the southern portion of the Donetsk Oblast in Ukraine. Ukrainians and Germans, and afterwards Russians, were settled among the Greeks. The Ukrainians mostly settled villages and some towns in this area, unlike the Greeks, who rebuilt their towns, even giving them their original Crimean names. Since this time in Ukraine the names of settlements in the Crimea match names of places in the south of the Donetsk Oblast: Yalta-Yalta, Hurzuf-Urzuf, etc.

Many settlers from the Greek Archipelago moved to southern parts of the Russian Empire in modern-day Ukraine following the establishment of the cities of Odesa, Kherson and Mykolaiv by Grigory Potemkin. Most of them engaged in trade and agriculture, although some entered the Russian imperial army. The Filiki Eteria, a Greek freemasonry-style society which was to play an important role in the Greek war of independence, was founded in Odesa in 1814 before relocating to Constantinople in 1818. The Greek colony in Odesa retained its importance until the early 20th century, and Greek shipping companies played a big role in transport connections with the region.

=== 20th century ===
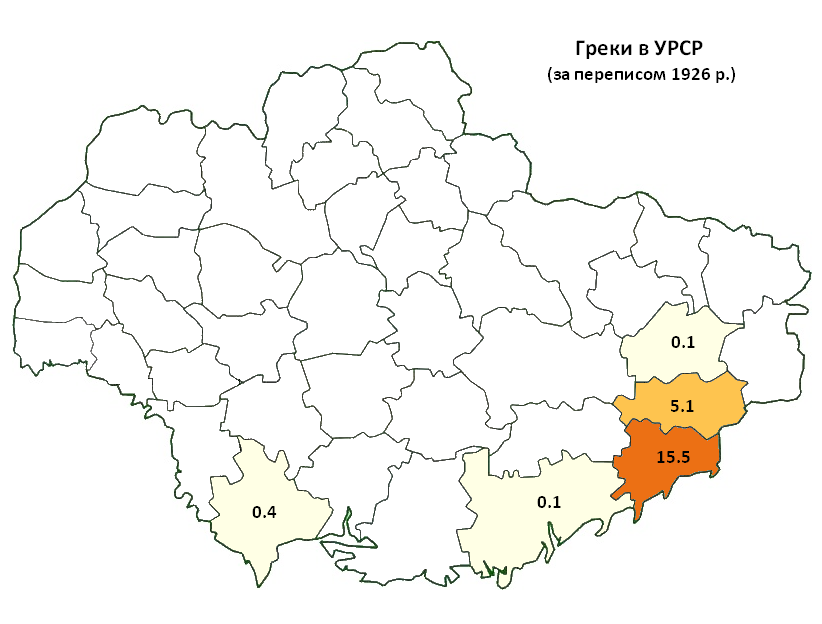
Greeks in the Ukrainian SSR (1926)

Under the Directorate of the Ukrainian People's Republic, Ukraine established a diplomatic representation in Greece, headed by Fedir Matushevsky, and after his death - by Modest Levytsky. According to the 1926 Soviet Census, 124,000 Greeks lived in the territory of Soviet Ukraine, of them 97,000 in Mariupol and vicinity. Three Greek national districts and 30 national village councils were established during that time. During the Interwar Era the Greek merchant navy had the biggest number of ships operating in the ports of Ukraine after the Soviet one.

During 1937–1938, the Pontic Greeks endured another deportation by the Soviet authorities known as the Greek Operation of the NKVD.

==== Greek Civil War refugees (1946–1949) ====
Other Greeks arrived in Ukraine even later, particularly, as Greek Communist refugees from mainly Greek Macedonia and other parts of Northern Greece, who had fled their homes following the 1946–1949 Greek Civil War and settled in the USSR, Czechoslovakia and other Eastern Bloc states. However, even among these late arrivals, there were many communist Greek refugees who settled in Ukraine following the Greek Civil War who were in fact Pontic Greeks or Caucasus Greeks and therefore often had ancestors who had lived within the southern territories of the Russian Empire before settling in Greece in the early 20th century.

=== Modern times ===
==== Independent Ukraine ====
By the 2001 census 91,500 Greeks remained, the vast majority of whom (77,000) still lived in the Donetsk Oblast. Higher estimates such as 160,000 were reported previously, the fall being explained by assimilation forced by the Soviet government. Other small populations of Greeks are in Odesa and other major cities.

==== Russo-Ukrainian War (2014–present) ====
In the prelude to the 2022 Russian invasion of Ukraine, the Greek foreign ministry released a statement claiming that three soldiers of the Ukrainian Army "murdered" two diaspora Greeks and injured two others in the village of Hranitne in Eastern Ukraine over "a trivial matter". Following the 2022 Russian invasion of Ukraine, ten diaspora Greeks were killed by Russian airstrikes near the city of Mariupol. In the village of Sartana, outside Mariupol, two diaspora Greeks were killed by Russian airstrikes. The Russian diplomatic mission in Athens published propagandistic material, according to which during the Siege of Mariupol, alleged Greek expatriates from Mariupol claimed that Ukrainian soldiers were trying to prevent them from leaving the besieged city. One Greek expatriate was reported by AFP to have perished in eastern Ukraine, with Greece condemning the Russian attack on Ukraine. Following the Mariupol hospital airstrike, Greek Prime Minister Kyriakos Mitsotakis tweeted on 18 March 2022 that "Greece is ready to rebuild the maternity hospital in Mariupol, the center of the Greek minority in Ukraine, a city dear to our hearts and symbol of the barbarity of the war".

== Distribution ==
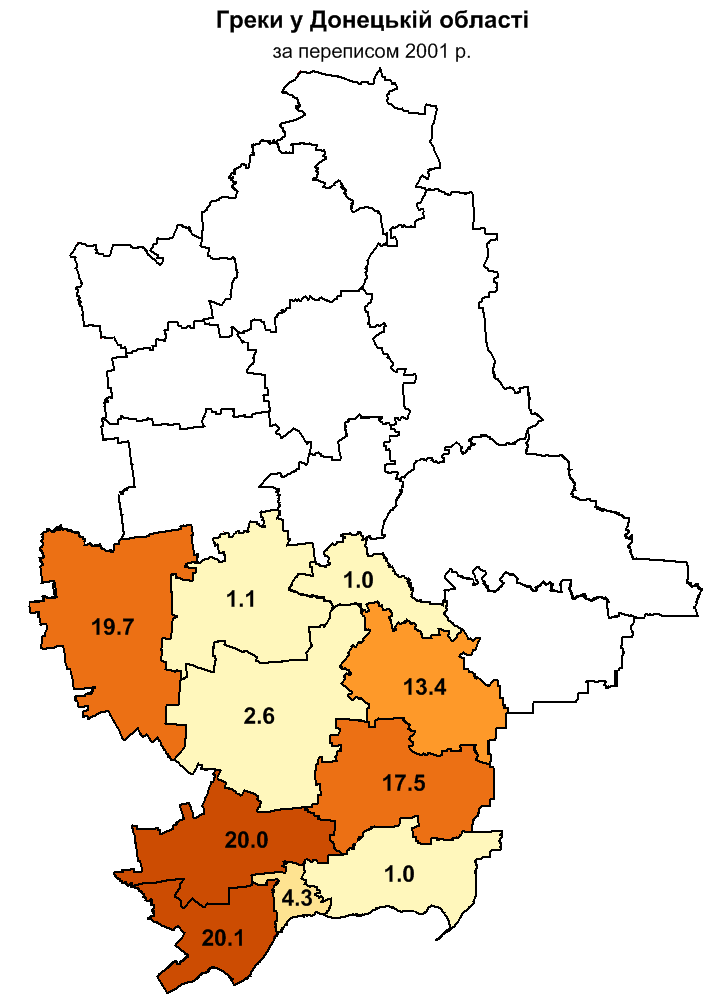
Greeks in Donetsk Oblast (2001)

Raions of Donetsk Oblast with significant Greek minority
Raion	Number of Greeks (2001)	Percentage
Mariupol	21,923	4.3%
Donetsk	10,180	1.0%
Velyka Novosilka Raion	9,730	19.7%
Starobesheve Raion	7,491	13.4%
Nikolske Raion	6,223	20.0%
Telmanove Raion	6,172	17.5%
Manhush Raion	5,882	20.1%

== Notable Ukrainians of Greek descent ==
- Borys Todurov
- Kapnist family
- Mykola Arkas
- Mykola Benardos
- Santa Dimopulos
- Sergei Korolev
- Vasyl Dzharty
- Viktor Chukarin
- Yegor Dmytrovych Dashko
- Yevhen Khacheridi

== See also ==
- Greece–Ukraine relations
- Urums
- Mariupol § Language structure
- Mariupol Greek
- Pontic Greeks, Greek diaspora
  - Greeks in Russia
  - Greeks in Georgia
