= Dobronravov =

Dobronravov (Russian: Добронравов) is a Russian masculine surname derived from the word combination dobryi and nrav meaning kind temper; its feminine counterpart is Dobronravova. Notable people with the surname include:

- Boris Dobronravov (1896–1949), Russian and Soviet actor
- Elena Dobronravova (1932–1999), Soviet and Russian actress
- Fyodor Dobronravov (born 1961), Russian actor
- Ivan Dobronravov (born 1989), Russian actor, son of Fyodor
- Nikolai Dobronravov (1928–2023), Russian poet and lyricist
