= Kapnisis =

Kapnisis (Greek: Καπνίσης), feminine Kapnisi is a Greek surname.

- Kostas Kapnisis
- Maria Kapnisi (born 1999), Greek footballer
- Spyridon Kapnisis

== See also ==
- Kapnist family
