= Lyudmila Gurchenko =

Soviet and Russian actress, singer (1935–2011)

- Людмила Гурченко
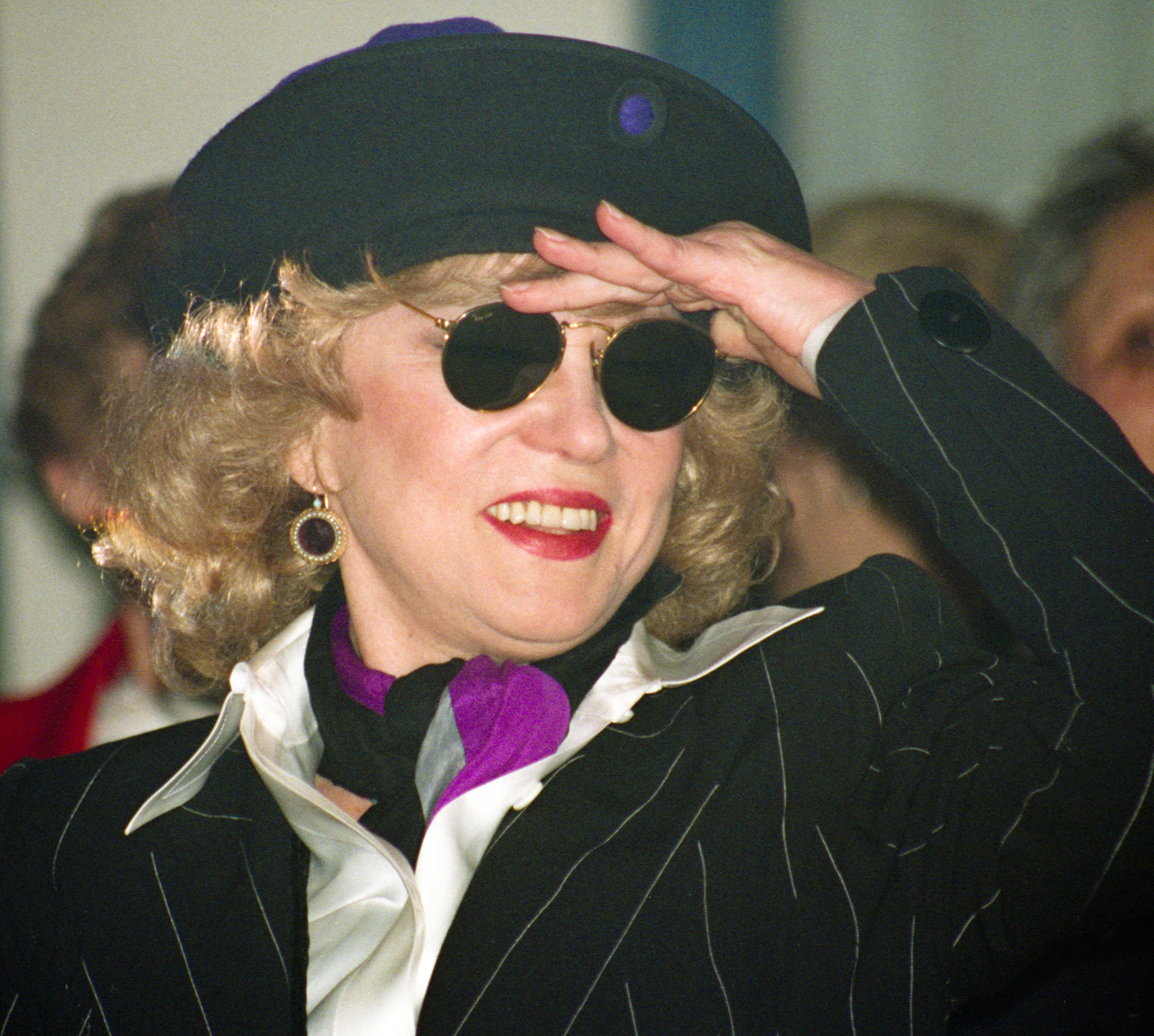
- Gurchenko in 1998
- Born: Lyudmila Markovna Gurchenko; November 12, 1935; Kharkiv, Ukrainian SSR, Soviet Union
- Died: March 30, 2011 (aged 75); Moscow, Russia
- Resting place: Novodevichy Cemetery
- Other name: Lyusya (Lucia)
- Education: Gerasimov Institute of Cinematography
- Occupations: actress; singer; entertainer; director; writer
- Years active: 1956–2011
- Notable credit(s): Carnival Night; Station for Two; Love and Pigeons
- Spouses: Vasily Ordynskiy (m. 1953; div. 1955) Boris Andronikashvili (m. 1958; div. 1960) Alexander Fadeev (m. 1962; div. 1964) Iosif Kobzon (m. 1967; div. 1970) Sergey Senin (m. 1993)
- Partner: Konstantin Kuperveys (1973-1991)
- Children: 1
- Relatives: Boris Pilnyak (father-in-law); Angelina Stepanova (mother-in-law); Alexander Fadeyev (father-in-law)
- Awards

Lyudmila Markovna Gurchenko (Note: Russian: Людмила Марковна Гурченко, romanized: Lyudmila Markovna Gurchenko; Ukrainian: Людмила Марківна Гурченко, romanized: Liudmyla Markivna Hurchenko) (12 November 1935 – 30 March 2011, née Gurchenko) (Note: Russian: Гурченкова, romanized: Gurchenko; Ukrainian: Гурченкова, romanized: Hurchenkova) was a Soviet and Russian actress, singer and entertainer. She was given the honorary title People's Artist of the USSR in 1983.

== Biography ==
Lyudmila Gurchenko was born in Kharkiv, USSR (now Ukraine) in 1935 as Lyudmila Gurchenko to Mark Gavrilovich Gurchenko (1898–1973) and Yelena Aleksandrovna Simonova-Gurchenko (1917–1999). Her father came from a Russian peasant family, while her mother was from Russian nobility — both from around Smolensk.

Before World War II they lived in a single room apartment on the ground floor at Mordvinovsky Lane No. 17 (now Gurchenko Lane #7). At that time, her parents worked at the Kharkiv Philharmonic Society. Mark Gurchenko was known to play the bayan (Russian accordion). Gurchenko spent a part of her childhood with her mom in her native city during the German invasion of the USSR, while her father joined the army and, together with his concert brigade, survived the war. After the withdrawal of the German Army from Kharkiv, Gurchenko auditioned for the local Beethoven Music School, where she performed the song About Vitya Cherevichkin with gestures, after which she was accepted as an acting student.

She moved to Moscow, enrolling in the Gerasimov Institute of Cinematography. At age 21, after starring in Eldar Ryazanov's 1956 directorial debut, the musical Carnival Night, Gurchenko overnight achieved fame as well as celebrity status. Throughout the next two years she toured the entire country with her Carnival Night-inspired musical numbers, attracting crowds of fans.

The Soviet cultural establishment, however, deemed her style too western and too out of line with Soviet standards. She was accused of receiving wages above State-set levels as compensation for her shows. She became the target of highly critical articles in several influential Soviet periodicals, including Tap Dance to the Left (Чечетка налево, Komsomolskaya Pravda, 1957, ) and Dositheos Morals (Досифеевские нравы, Ogoniok, 1958, , devoted to her financial wrongdoing and her alleged lack of patriotism. The year of 1958 saw the release of another musical with Ludmila, Girl with a Guitar, shot mostly before these articles were published. The musical was not recommended for wide distribution and was a box-office flop.

In the mid 1970s, Gurchenko starred in several films, which, although only moderately successful, helped showcase her dramatic talent. In 1979 she landed a role in director Andrei Konchalovsky's Siberiade and in 1982 in Station for Two, once again by Eldar Ryazanov, who by then had become one of the USSR's most popular and prolific directors. The role of forty-something waitress Vera in this touching film became her long-awaited comeback as a superstar of Soviet film. Subsequently, she starred in Vladimir Menshov's Love and Pigeons, among many other movies and TV shows. Her multifaceted talent was recognized on many occasions. She received the title of People's Artist of the USSR, the highest honour that could be bestowed to a musical artist, in 1983. She carried a leading role in The Burn (Ожог – 1988) with Director Gennady Glagoliev and Director of Photography Igor Chepusov.

Gurchenko wrote a book about her life during German occupation in Kharkiv and about her life in the beginning of her Acting Career.

In 2010, she was awarded an Order "For Merit to the Fatherland", 2nd Class (she received the 4th Class of the same Order in 2000 and the 3d Class in 2005), one of the highest civil decorations in post-Soviet Russia (with 3rd and 2nd Degree Orders having been awarded to very few extremely distinguished individuals, and the 1st Degree Order being nominally held by a serving President of Russia). At the age of 70, she still performed and attended galas.

== Personal life ==
Gurchenko was married six times, including a short-lived marriage to Joseph Kobzon between 1967 and 1970. She had one daughter, Maria (5 June 1959 — 8 November 2017) from her second marriage, and two grandchildren as well as one great-granddaughter.

On 14 February 2011, Gurchenko fell near her house and broke her hip. She was taken to the hospital and underwent an operation the following day. On 30 March her condition worsened due to a pulmonary embolism and she died that evening. She was buried at the Novodevichy Cemetery (Moscow) after a civil funeral a few days later.

== Selected filmography ==
- The Road of Truth (1956) as Lyusya
- Carnival Night (1956) as Lena Krylova
- A Girl with Guitar (1958) as Tanya Fedosova
- Baltic Skies (1961) as Sonya Bystrova
- Roman and Francesca (1961) as Francesca
- The Man from Nowhere (1961) as Lena
- Sluttish (1961) as Khristina
- Jalgrattataltsutajad (1964) as Rita Laur
- Balzaminov's Marriage (1964) as Ustinka
- Workers' Settlement (1966) as Mariya, Leonid's wife
- The Bridge Is Built (1966) as Zhenya
- Blasted Hell (1967) as Greta
- No and Yes (1967) as Lyusya Korablyova
- White Explosion (1969) as Vera Arsenova
- My good Dad (1970) as Valentina Ivanova
- One of Us (1971) as Klara Ovcharenko
- Road to Rübezahl (1971) as Shura Solovyova
- Shadow (1971) as Yulia Juli
- The Crown of the Russian Empire, or Once Again the Elusive Avengers (1971) as Agrafena Zavolzhskaya
- What Is to Be Done? (1971) as woman in black
- Karpukhin (1973) as Ovsyannikova
- Summer Dreams (1973) as Galina Sakhno
- Open Book (1973) as Glafira Rybakova
- Old Walls (1973) as Anna Smirnova
- Vanyushin's Children (1974) as Klavdiya Shchyotkina
- The Straw Hat (1974) as Clara Bocardon
- Diary of a School Director (1975) as Nina Sergeyevna
- Step Forward (1976) as Valentina Stepanovna
- Ma-ma (Мама, 1976) as Goat-Mom
- Sentimental Romance (1976) as Mariya Petruchenko
- Heavenly Swallows (Небесные ласточки, 1976) as Korina
- Family Melodrama (1976) as Valentina Barabanova
- Twenty Days Without War (1977) as Nina
- The Second Attempt of Viktor Krokhin (1977) as Lyuba
- Wrong Connection (1978) as Margarita Illarionovna Vyaznikova
- Getting to Know the Big, Wide World (1978) as stranger
- Five Evenings (1979) as Tamara Vasilyevna
- Siberiade (1979) as Taya Solomina in 1960s
- Particularly Important Task (1980) as Elvira Lunina
- An Ideal Husband (1981) as Mrs. Laura Cheveley
- Waiting for Love (Любимая женщина механика Гаврилова, 1981) as Rita
- Flights in Dreams and Reality (1983) as Larisa Yuryevna
- Station for Two (1983) as Vera Nikolayevna Nefedova
- Magistral (Russian: Магистраль) (1983) as Gvozdeva
- Shurochka (1983) as Raisa Peterson
- Recipe of Her Youth (1983)
- A Rogue's Saga (1984) as Ekaterina Ivanovna
- Love and Pigeons (1985) as Raisa Zakharovna
- Applause, Applause... (1985)
- Dreamers (1987) as Grafinyata
- My Seawoman (1990) as Lyudmila Pashkova
- Viva Gardes-Marines! (1991) as Joanna Elisabeth of Holstein-Gottorp
- Gardemarines-III (1992) as Joanna Elisabeth of Holstein-Gottorp
- Prokhindiada 2 (1994) as Yekaterina Ivanovna
- Old Hags (Старые клячи, 2000) as Liza
- Stealing Tarantino as Anna Vasilyevna
- Carnival Night 2, or 50 Years Later (2007) as cameo
- Motley Twilight (2010) as Anna Dmitrievna (final film role)

== Discography ==
Studio albums

- 1979 — Бенефис Людмилы Гурченко (LP, «Melodiya» 33 М 60—42123-24)
- 1983 — Любимые песни (LP, «Melodiya» С60 19259 004)
- 1984 — Песни военных лет (LP, «Melodiya» С60 20825 001)
- 1992 — Да, не верится!.. (LP, «Russian Disc» R60 01001)
- 1994 — Люблю (LP, «РОМ Лтд.» 0111001)
- 1995 — Хорошее настроение (CD, «General Records»)
- 1996 — Что знает о любви любовь (CD, «General Records»)
- 2000 — Прощай, двадцатый... (CD, «Extraphone», «Kvadro-Disc»)
- 2001 — Мадлен, спокойно! (CD, «Extraphone»; feat. David Tukhmanov)
- 2004 — Жизнь как дым... (CD, «Extraphone»)
- 2005 — Грустная пластинка (CD, «Extraphone»)
- 2009 — Чувство новизны (CD, no label; feat. Felix Ilynykh)
- 2009 — Музыка к фильму "Пёстрые сумерки" (CD, «Творческое Объединение «Дуэт»»)
- 2010 — Моё взрослое детство (2хCD, «Extraphone»)

== Tribute ==
On November 12, 2021, Google celebrated her 86th birthday with a Google Doodle.

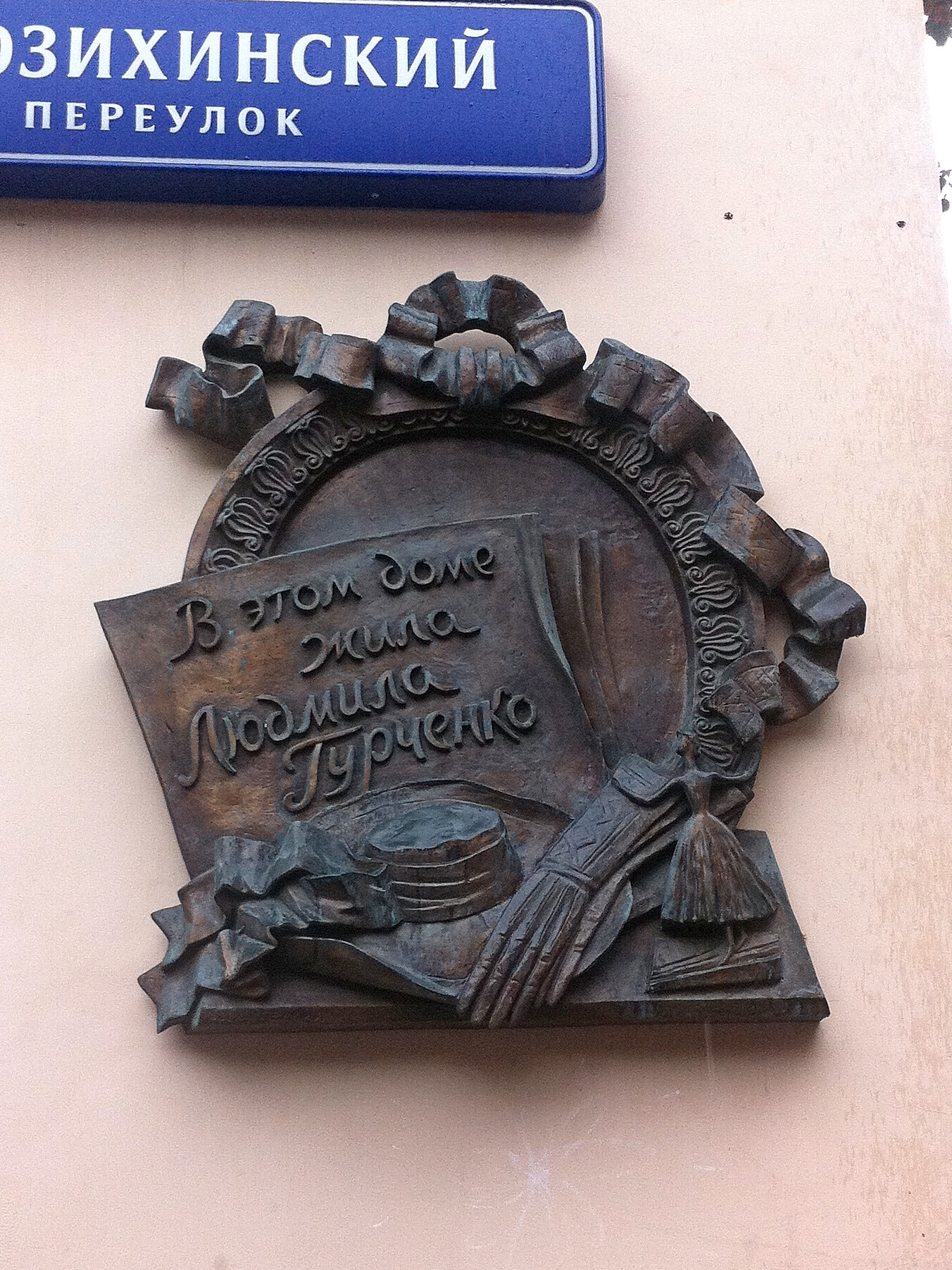
Memorial plaque on the facade of a house in Moscow.

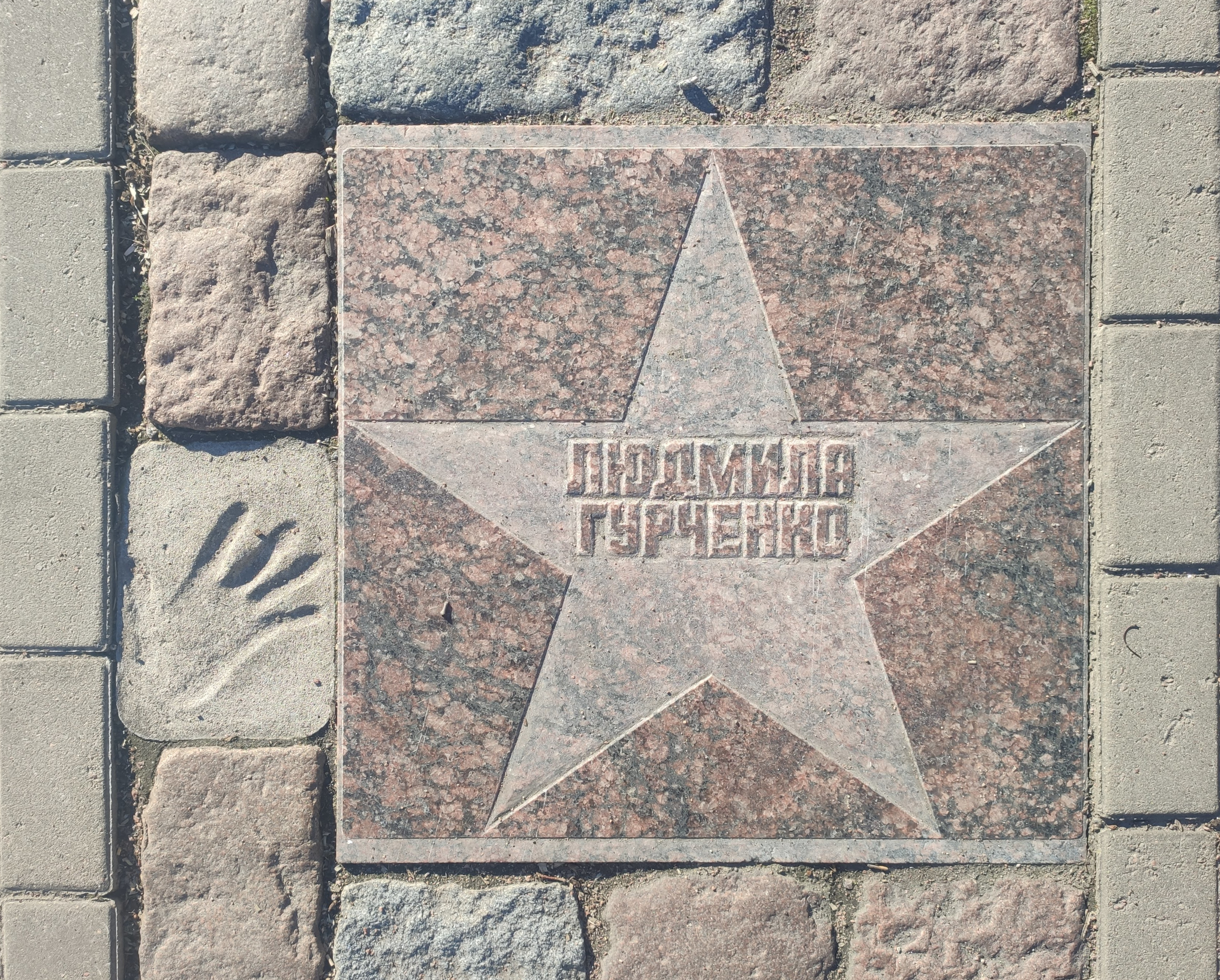
Star on the Actors' Walk of Fame in Vyborg.

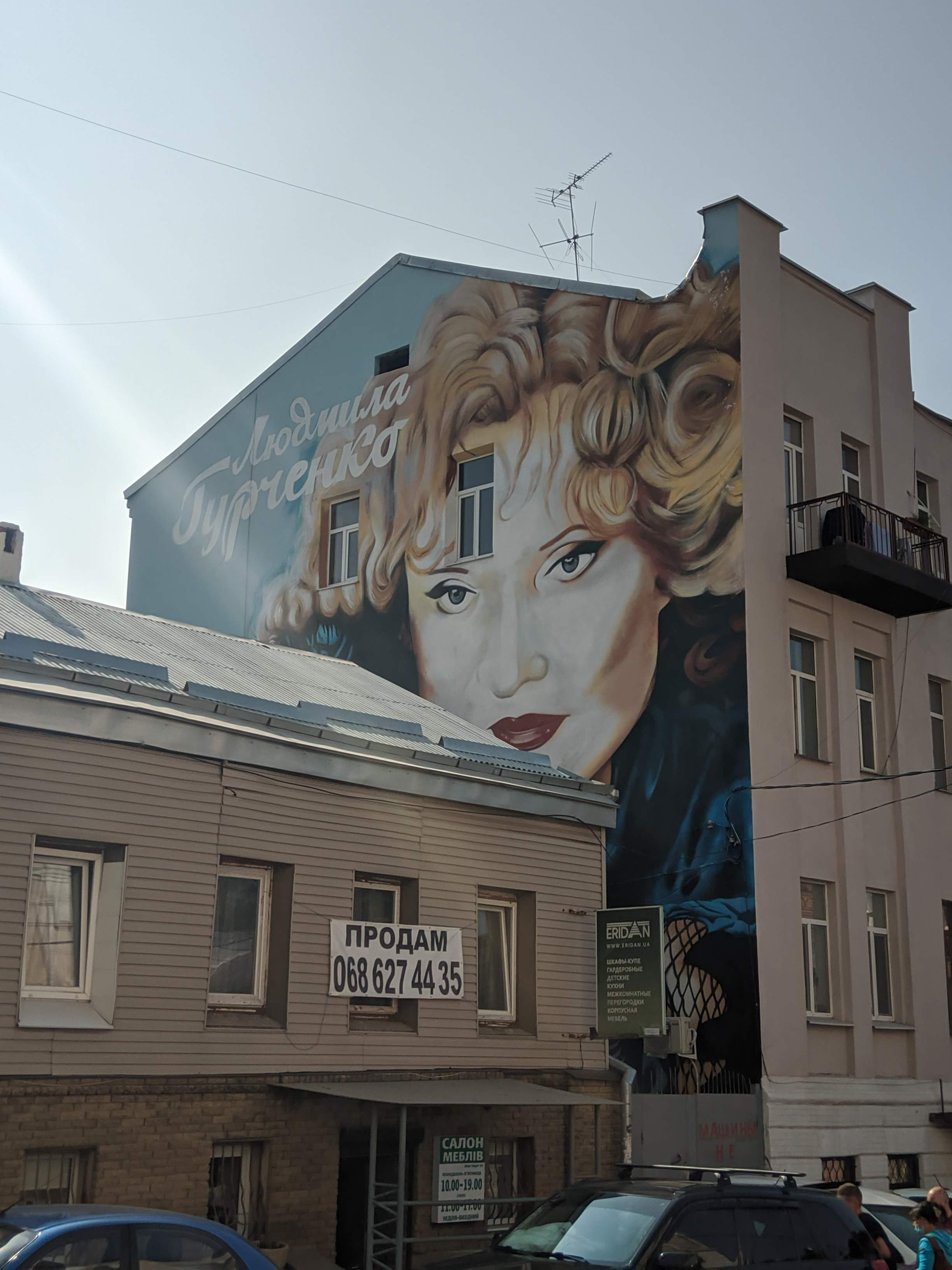
Mural in Kharkiv.
