= The Living Corpse (1968 film) =

- Russian: Живой труп
- Directed by: Vladimir Vengerov
- Written by: Leo Tolstoy; Vladimir Vengerov
- Produced by: Mikhail Gendenshtein
- Starring: Aleksey Batalov; Alla Demidova; Oleg Basilashvili; Lidiya Shtykan; Sofiya Pilyavskaya
- Cinematography: Genrikh Marandzhyan
- Edited by: Stera Gorakova
- Music by: Isaac Schwartz
- Production company: Lenfilm
- Release date: 1968
- Running time: 143 min.
- Country: Soviet Union
- Language: Russian

The Living Corpse (Russian: Живой труп, romanized: Zhivoy trup) is a 1968 Soviet drama film directed by Vladimir Vengerov.

== Plot ==
Fyodor Protasov as a result of unwillingness to live dishonestly sinks to the bottom of society.

== Cast ==
- Aleksey Batalov as Fyodor Protasov (Fedya)
- Alla Demidova as Yelizaveta Andreyevna Protasova (Liza)
- Oleg Basilashvili as Viktor Mikhajlovich Karenin
- Lidiya Shtykan as Anna Pavlovna
- Sofiya Pilyavskaya as Anna Dmitrievna Karenina
- Yevgeny Kuznetsov as Sergey Abrezkov
- Svetlana Toma as Masha
- Vsevolod Kuznetsov as Afremov
- Oleg Borisov as the investigating magistrate
- Nikolay Boyarsky as Petushkov, the artist
- Innokenty Smoktunovsky as Ivan Petrovich
