= Workers' Settlement =

- Russian: Рабочий посёлок
- Directed by: Vladimir Vengerov
- Written by: Vera Panova
- Starring: Oleg Borisov; Lyudmila Gurchenko; Nikolai Simonov; Tatyana Doronina; Viktor Avdyushko
- Cinematography: Genrikh Marandzhyan
- Music by: Isaac Schwartz
- Production company: Lenfilm
- Release date: 1965
- Running time: 127 minutes
- Country: Soviet Union
- Language: Russian

Workers' Settlement (Russian: Рабочий посёлок) is a 1965 black and white Soviet drama film directed by Vladimir Vengerov.

The film tells the story of a blind war veteran who struggles to rebuild his life amidst the hardships of post-war devastation, finding solace in unexpected support from his community.

== Plot ==
Leonid Plesheyev returns home from the Great Patriotic War blind, a former hero of the frontlines now reluctantly reduced to dependency. Struggling with his condition, he turns to drinking, finding temporary relief from the darkness that consumes him. However, his friends rally around him, helping him rediscover a fulfilling life despite his challenges.

The film portrays the harsh realities of life for ordinary people in the difficult post-war years. Rather than focusing on the optimism and hope for a brighter collective future, it emphasizes the grueling, often tragic daily struggles of rebuilding lives devastated by war.

One of the central characters, a woman, returns with her young son to her village, only to find it reduced to ashes. She, like others, must rebuild her life from the ground up. Among the returnees is Leonid, a mature man who fought honorably and suffered for his homeland. However, his yearning for rest and happiness conflicts with the demands of post-war labor. Leonid often spends the family's last food rations on drinks with friends, leaving his wife to deal with the consequences, brushing it off with comments like, "Tell them you lost it; they’ll figure something out."

== Cast ==
- Oleg Borisov as Leonid
- Lyudmila Gurchenko as Mariya - Leonid's wife
- Nikolai Simonov as Sotnikov
- Tatyana Doronina as Polina
- Viktor Avdyushko as Grisha
- Elena Dobronravova as Frosya
- Lyubov Sokolova as Kapustina
- Viktor Chekmaryov
- Aleksandr Sokolov as Dmitriy Prokhorov
- Mariya Prizvan-Sokolova
