= Commander of the Lucky 'Pike' =

- German film poster
- Directed by: Boris Volchek
- Written by: Aleksander Moldavsky; Vladimir Valutsky; Boris Volchek
- Starring: Pyotr Velyaminov; Donatas Banionis; Elena Dobronravova
- Cinematography: Boris Volchek; Valentin Makarov
- Edited by: Lidia Milioti
- Music by: Aleksandr Zatsepin
- Production company: Mosfilm
- Release date: 1972
- Running time: 95 minutes
- Country: Soviet Union
- Language: Russian

Commander of the Lucky 'Pike' (Russian: Командир счастливой 'Щуки', romanized: Komandir schastlivoi 'Schuki') is a 1972 Soviet action war film directed by Boris Volchek.

The film's title is a pun in Russian, the submarine 'Щ-721' is nicknamed as pike (Russian: щука, romanized: schuka, lit. 'pike').

== Plot ==
In 1942, when the German troops are preparing to seize Murmansk, the Soviet command decides to intensify the activities of the Northern Fleet. The crew of the submarine 'Щ-721' performs the task of destroying enemy transport with soldiers and ammunition. The submarine of Strogov is considered to be lucky. The crew under his leadership works wonders and gets out of difficult situations. Also, Strogov is developing a tactic of a non-referential torpedo attack in spite of the skepticism of his colleagues and leadership.

During the execution of the combat mission, Strogov has to take on board the boat the evacuated crew of another Soviet submarine. Fascists lead a long pursuit after the submarine. In the end, it finds itself in an almost desperate situation - at the bottom of the sea almost without oxygen. Commander Aleksei Strogov manages to save the boat and crew, paying for it with his life ...

== Cast ==
- Pyotr Velyaminov as Captain Aleksei Petrovich Strogov
- Donatas Banionis as Commissar Viktor Ionovich Sherknis (voiced by Aleksandr Demyanenko)
- Elena Dobronravova as Engineer Svetlana Ivanovna Vedenina
- Vladimir Ivanov as Red-fleet, torpedo operator Golik
- Mikhail Volkov as Captain-lieutenant, commander of the submarine No. 703 Valery Rudakov
- Vladimir Kashpur as Midshipman, boatswain Nosov (Kuzmich)
- Stanislav Borodokin as Sergeant-major of the first degree, radio operator Sergei Shukhov
- Shota Mshvenieradze as Sergeant of the second degree Shota Kharadze
- Konstantin Raikin as Cook Bulkin
- Nikita Astakhov as Red Navy member
- Anatoly Borisov as German Admiral
- Pavel Makhotin as Commander of the Northern Fleet, Vice Admiral
- Svetlana Sukhovey as Oksana
- Valentina Berezutskaya as Storekeeper
- Yevgeny Yevstigneyev as Stepan Lukich
- Lyubov Sokolova as Aunt Dusya
