= Recipe of Her Youth =

- Russian: Рецепт её молодости
- Directed by: Yevgeny Ginzburg
- Written by: Aleksandr Adabashyan; Karel Capek
- Starring: Lyudmila Gurchenko; Oleg Borisov; Aleksandr Abdulov; Anatoliy Romashin; Armen Dzhigarkhanyan
- Cinematography: Genri Abramyan
- Edited by: Valeriya Belova
- Music by: Georgiy Garanyan
- Release date: 1983
- Running time: 92 minute
- Country: Soviet Union
- Language: Russian

Recipe of Her Youth (Russian: Рецепт её молодости) is a 1983 Soviet music film directed by Yevgeny Ginzburg.

The film tells about the famous three-hundred-year-old actress and the secret of her youth. The film is based on the Czech play The Makropulos Affair by Karel Čapek.

== Plot ==
The film is set in the early 20th century, following the famous singer Emilia Marty, who arrives for a performance in a European city (Prague, according to the source play). At the same time, the Supreme Court is preparing to close a longstanding case, "Gregor vs. Prus," which has dragged on for a century. Albert Gregor has been trying unsuccessfully to claim the inheritance of Baron Josef Prus, who died in the 1820s, but lacks proof of his lineage. Unexpectedly, Emilia intervenes in the case, revealing the location of documents that confirm Gregor's relation to Prus.

Only someone incredibly close to Prus, who died about a century ago, could have known where these documents were hidden. It's then revealed that Emilia is actually 337 years old, despite appearing no older than 35. Her secret to eternal youth lies in a magical elixir created by court alchemist Makropulos for the Habsburg Emperor Rudolf II, who feared drinking it himself and ordered it tested on the alchemist's daughter. In the film's song "It Happened," the ingredients of this elixir include a strange mixture: "one-third chlorine, one-third methyl, chicken brains, crocodile tears, manure, purgatives, bromine, and gorilla blood."

== Cast ==
- Lyudmila Gurchenko
- Oleg Borisov
- Aleksandr Abdulov
- Anatoliy Romashin
- Armen Dzhigarkhanyan
- Yelena Stepanova
- Sergey Shakurov
- Anatoliy Kalmykov
- Sergei Dityatev
- Liliya Sabitova
