= The Forest (1953 film) =

1953 drama film

- Directed by: Semyon Timoshenko; Vladimir Vengerov
- Written by: Aleksandr Ostrovskiy (play)
- Cinematography: Solomon Belenky; Muzakir Shurukov
- Production company: Lenfilm Studio
- Release date: 1953
- Running time: 170 minutes
- Country: Soviet Union
- Language: Russian

The Forest (Russian: Лес, romanized: Les) is a 1953 Soviet drama film directed by Semyon Timoshenko and Vladimir Vengerov.

== Cast ==
- Yelizaveta Time
- K. Trofimova
- Vasiliy Merkurev as Ivan Petrovich Vosmibratov
- Konstantin Kalinis
- Yuriy Tolubeev
- Aleksandr Borisov
- Georgi Kulbush
- Konstantin Adashevsky

== Bibliography ==
- Rollberg, Peter. Historical Dictionary of Russian and Soviet Cinema. Scarecrow Press, 2008.
