= Old Walls =

1973 Soviet film by Viktor Tregubovich

- Russian: Старые стены
- Directed by: Viktor Tregubovich
- Written by: Anatoli Grebnev
- Starring: Lyudmila Gurchenko; Armen Dzhigarkhanyan; Yevgeniya Sabelnikova; Vera Kuznetsova; Yevgeny Kindinov
- Cinematography: Eduard Rozovsky
- Edited by: Margarita Shadrina
- Music by: Georgy Portnov
- Release date: 1973
- Running time: 96 minute
- Country: Soviet Union
- Language: Russian

Old Walls (Russian: Старые стены) is a 1973 Soviet romantic drama film directed by Viktor Tregubovich.

== Plot ==
A woman works as the director of a weaving factory near Moscow and has devoted herself entirely to her work. As she gets on in years, she meets a man and tries to avoid falling in love.

== Cast ==
- Lyudmila Gurchenko as Anna Smirnova
- Armen Dzhigarkhanyan as Volodya
- Yevgeniya Sabelnikova as Irina
- Vera Kuznetsova as Babushka (as V. Kuznetsova)
- Yevgeny Kindinov as Pavlik (as Ye. Kindinov)
- Fyodor Odinokov as Aleksandr Kolesov (as F. Odinokov)
- Boris Gusakov as Viktor Petrovich
- Valentina Ananina as Anna Nikitichna (as V. Ananyena)
- Boris Arakelov as Yermakov (as B. Arakelov)
- Alla Budnitskaya as Ninochka (as A. Budnitskaya)
