= Rupture (1983 film) =

- Russian: Обрыв
- Directed by: Vladimir Vengerov
- Written by: Ivan Goncharov; Vladimir Vengerov
- Starring: Georgi Antonov; Elena Finogeeva; Nikolay Kochegarov; Rimma Markova; Marina Yakovleva
- Cinematography: Anatoliy Zabolotskiy
- Edited by: Tamara Guseva
- Music by: Isaac Schwartz
- Production company: Lenfilm
- Release date: 1983
- Running time: 143 minutes
- Country: Soviet Union
- Language: Russian

Rupture (Russian: Обрыв) is a 1983 Soviet drama film directed by Vladimir Vengerov.

== Plot ==
The film is based on the eponymous novel by Ivan Goncharov.

== Cast ==
- Georgi Antonov as Boris Rajsky
- Elena Finogeeva
- Nikolay Kochegarov
- Rimma Markova
- Marina Yakovleva as Marfinka
- Elena Solovey
- Vitaliy Shapovalov
- Nikolay Ivanov
- Tamara Lebedeva
- Oleg Korchikov
