= Maria Kapnist =

Ukrainian film actress

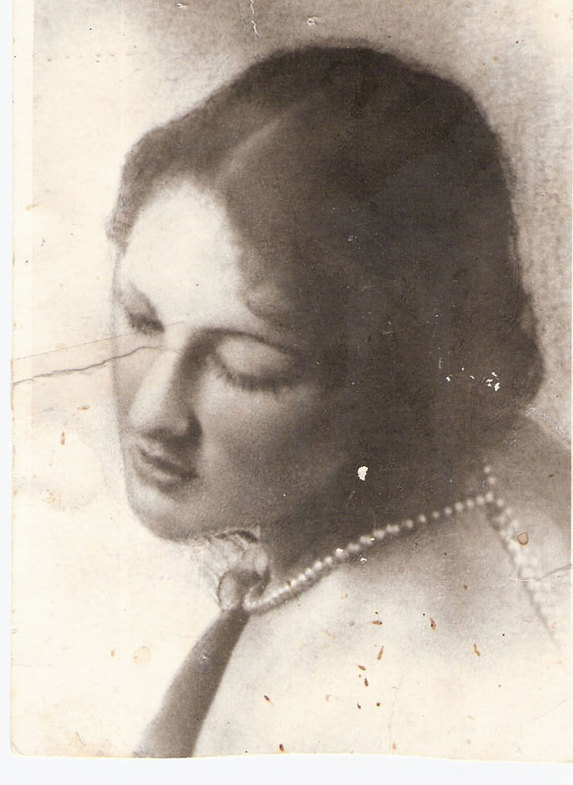
- Born: Marietta Rostyslavivna Kapnist-Sirko; March 22, 1913; St.Petersburg, Russian Empire
- Died: 25 October 1993 (aged 80); Kyiv, Ukraine
- Occupation: actress
- Years active: 1956-1993

Maria Rostyslavivna Kapnist (Ukrainian: Марі́я Ростисла́вівна Капні́ст, Russian: Мари́я Ростисла́вовна Капни́ст), née Marietta Rostyslavivna Kapnist-Sirko, Russian: Мариэ́тта Ростисла́вовна Капни́ст-Серко́ (9 (22) March 1913, St. Petersburg – 25 October 1993, Kyiv) was a Ukrainian actress, and an Honored Artist of the Ukrainian SSR (1988). During her nearly forty-year acting career, from 1956 to 1993, she played more than a hundred roles.

== Early life and education ==
Marietta Kapnist-Sirko was born on 22 March 1913 in St. Petersburg in a Ukrainian family. Her father, Count Rostyslav Kapnist, was a direct descendant of Myrhorod and Kyiv colonel of the Zaporizhian Army Vasyli Kapnist, and her mother, Anastasia Baydak – a great-great-granddaughter of Zaporizhian Otaman Ivan Sirko.

Kapnist received her first vocal lessons from an Opera singer Feodor Chaliapin who was the first to draw attention at her talent during her first stage performance in a home play.

The Kapnists lived in St. Petersburg until 1917 when they had to flee to Sudak, Crimea to escape from the revolutionary storms. In 1921, Kapnist’s father, Rostyslav, was shot by a punitive detachment of the Cheka. Soon, the Kapnists’ house in Sudak was destroyed, and the surviving family members had to go into hiding.

In 1927, Kapnist moved to Kyiv to live with her aunt and graduated from a labor school there. Then Kapnist moved to Leningrad where she joined the theater studio of Yuri Yuriev at Leningrad Drama Theater named after Alexander Pushkin, and she graduated in 1934.

In 1934, when Sergei Kirov was killed, the Kapnists who were friends with Kirov were considered unreliable again. Because of her noble origin, Kapnist was expelled from the Theater Institute and was prohibited to live in Leningrad. Therefore, she was forced to return to Kyiv and later to Batumi to work as an accountant.

== Repressions ==
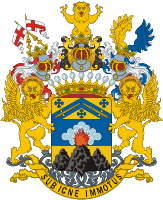
Kapnist family coat of arms

In 1937, Kapnist was arrested for the first time but soon was released. She was arrested again on 27 August 1941. Kapnist was accused of spreading anti-Soviet propaganda. She was sentenced to 8 years in labor camps according to Article 58-10 part 1 (“Propaganda and agitation calling for overthrow of Soviet government”). In August 1949, Kapnist was freed from Steplag and sent to Kazachin village in the Krasnoyarsk Territory.

In 1950, she gave birth to a daughter Radislava in the prison hospital Steplag in Kazakhstan, where she lived in exile and worked in coal mines. The father of her child was Jan Volkonski, a Polish engineer who was shot three years after Radislava was born.

In 1951, Kapnist was arrested again and sentenced to 10 years in prison on charges of anti-Soviet agitation. Her 2-year-old daughter was taken from her and placed in the Esaulovsky orphanage in the Krasnoyarsk Territory. Kapnist’s friend went to Moscow and managed to get an appointment with a Soviet political figure Anastas Mikoyan to whom she complained about Kapnist’s illegal imprisonment. Through Mikoyan’s intervention, Kapnist was released in February 1956 before the end of her 10-year term (supposed to end in 1963).

== Rehabilitation and career in the cinema ==
After Kapnist was released she went to Moscow and then to Kyiv in the same year. She moved there to live with her friend from the 1930s, Anna Pilnyak and worked as a masseuse. The same year Kapnist began acting in films, debuting in the 1956 film One Night directed by Maksym Ruf and Oleksandr Muzil. She got an appointment with the writer and academician Mykola Bazhan and with his assistance the Union of Soviet Writers of Ukraine hired Kapnist as a caretaker of one of the writers’ wife. Kapnist was rehabilitated in 1958.

Kapnist was not allowed to take her daughter Radislava as she was issued a certificate stating she has a nervous system disorder. Her daughter was adopted by a friend Valentyna Bazavluk.

By the decision of the Supreme Court of the Russian Soviet Federative Socialist Republic the sentence and all subsequent decisions in the Kapnist case were overturned and the case against her was terminated for lack of corpus delicti.

From 1960 until 1993, Kapnist worked as a full-time actress at the Dovzhenko Film Studios. During this time, she has played more than a hundred roles and episodes, including Ruslan and Lyudmila, The Lost Letter, The Old Fortress, Bronze Bird, Gypsies Are Found Near Heaven, The Wild Hunt of King Stakh, Evenings on a Farm near Dikanka, Hearts of three, and many others. Kapnist became famous for her roles as old women, witches, sorceresses, gypsies and countesses.

In 1988, Kapnist was awarded the title of Honored Artist of the Ukrainian SSR.

The documentary Maria Kapnist. Three Worlds (1989) by Ukrainian director Viktor Vasylenko is dedicated to Kapnist.

== Death ==
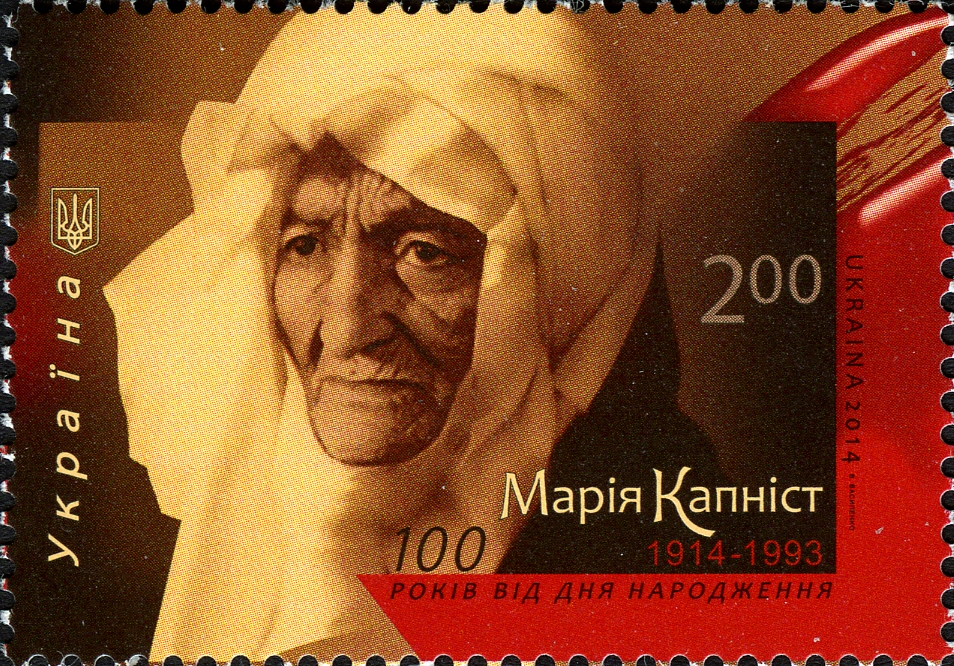
Stamp of Ukraine dedicated to Maria Kapnist

During the years spent in the labor camps where Kapnist had to work in the underground mines, she developed a claustrophobia and couldn’t use underground passages. In October 1993, she was involved in a car accident when crossing Peremohy Avenue in Kyiv near Oleksandr Dovzhenko Film Studio. Maria Kapnists died of complications after the car accident on 25 October 1993 in Oleksandr Hospital in Kyiv. She was buried in the village of Velyka Obukhivka, Myrhorod, Poltava district.

== Commemoration ==
In 2009, Ukrainian director Serhiy Dariychuk dedicated his documentary “Proud Tear” (2009) to Maria Kapnist.

In 2014 Ukrainian state postal service Ukrposhta issued the postage stamp #1370 “Maria Kapnist. 1914-1993. 100 years since birth". The same year a memorial plaque dedicated to Kapnist was placed on building number 13 on Vasyl Lypkivskyi 25/7 in Kyiv.

In 2018, Kyiv City Council renamed Zhelyabov Street to Maria Kapnist Street.

== Filmography (selected) ==
- 1956 — Ivanna
- 1959 — Tavriya
- 1960 — Far from the Motherland
- 1961 — Chasing Two Hares
- 1962 — We, Two of Men
- 1964 — The Keys of Skies
- 1965 — Shadows of Forgotten Ancestors
- 1966-67 — War and Peace
- 1970 — Hail, Mary!
- 1971 — Olesya
- 1972 — Ruslan and Ludmila
- 1972 — The Lost Letter
- 1972 — That Sweet Word: Liberty!
- 1976 — The Blue Bird
- 1976 — Gypsies Are Found Near Heaven
- 1977 — Love at First Sight
- 1984 — Chance
- 1988 — New Adventures of a Yankee in King Arthur's Court
- 1991 — Anna Karamazoff
- 1991 — Dude — Water Winner
- 1992 — Psychic
