= Greece–Ukraine relations =

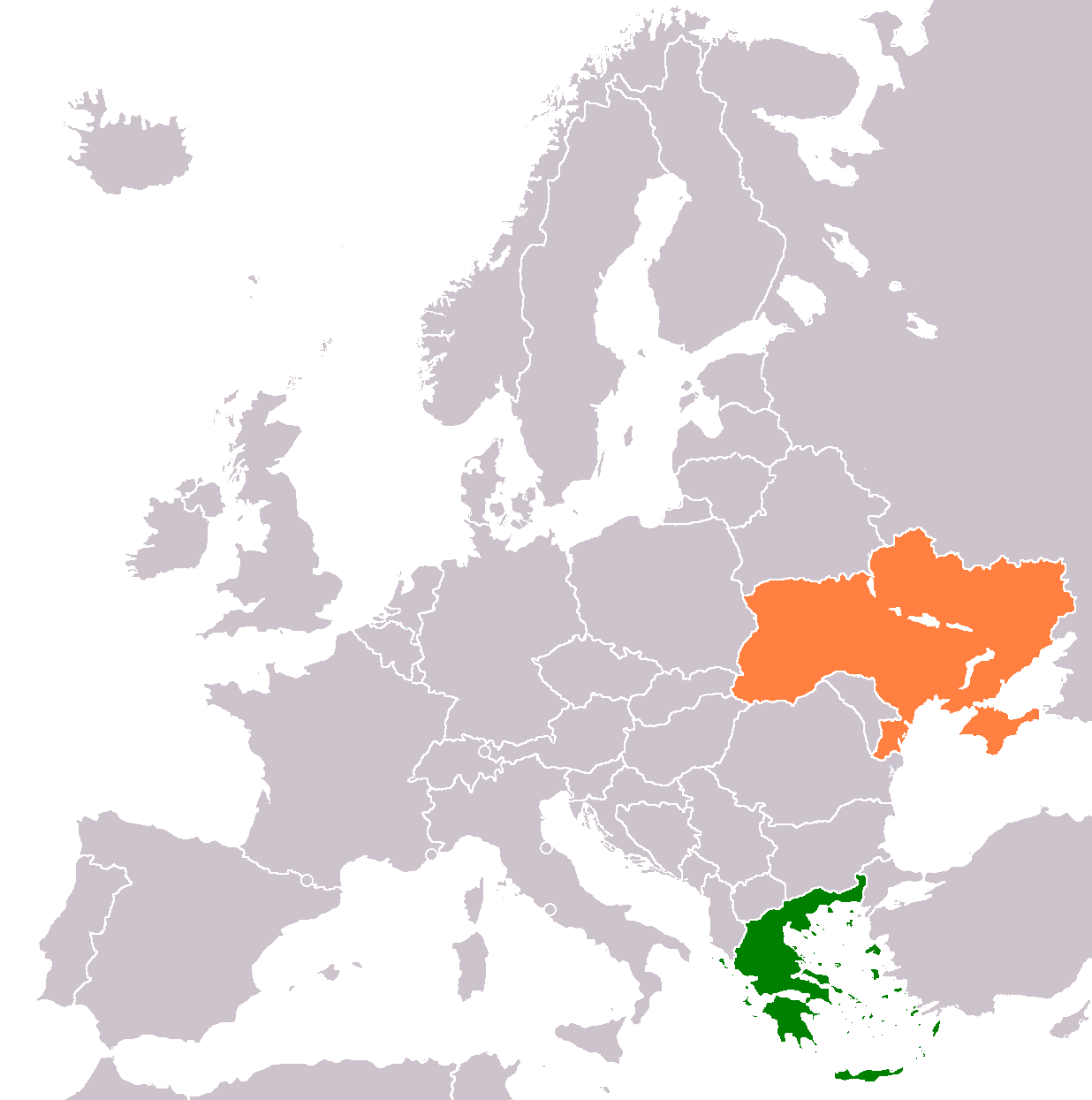
- Greece: Ukraine

Diplomatic mission
- Embassy of Greece, Kyiv: Embassy of Ukraine, Athens

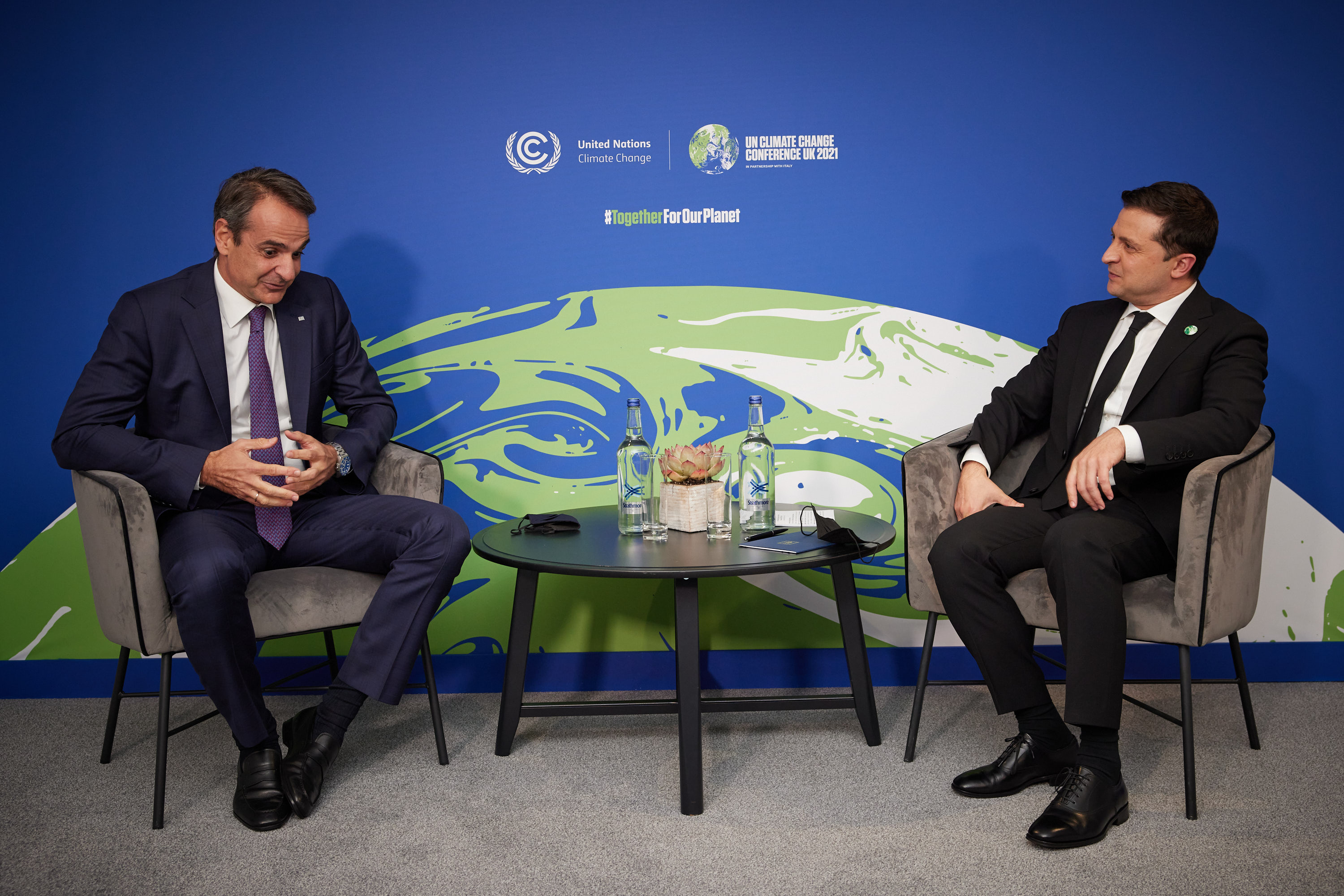
Greek Prime Minister Kyriakos Mitsotakis with Ukrainian President Volodymyr Zelenskyy with in the 2021 United Nations Climate Change Conference in Glasgow, 1 November 2021

Greece and Ukraine have deep ties due to Orthodox Christianity and enjoy strong diplomatic relations, due to Greece's active diplomatic support for Ukraine over the Annexation of Crimea by the Russian Federation. Greece is also one of the main supporters of Ukraine's entry into the European Union and NATO. Greece recognized Ukraine on December 31, 1991. Both countries established diplomatic relations in 1992. Greece opened an embassy in Kyiv in 1993, general-consulates were set up in Mariupol and Odesa. Ukraine has opened an embassy in Athens and since April 2004 a general-consulate in Thessaloniki. Both countries are full members of the Organization for Security and Co-operation in Europe and of the Organization of the Black Sea Economic Cooperation. There is a large Greek community living in Ukraine (mostly in the southern and eastern regions of the nation). Ukraine was first settled by the Greeks as early as 500 B.C. The Ukrainian city of Odesa (among others) was founded by ancient Greek colonists, being also the place where the Filiki Eteria secret organization was founded. Greece is a member of the European Union and NATO, which Ukraine applied for in 2022.

Greece is a staunch supporter of Ukraine in its war with Russia. In March 2022 Greece offered to rebuild the Mariupol hospital which was bombed by Russia and is located in the heart of the Greek community in Ukraine.

== History ==
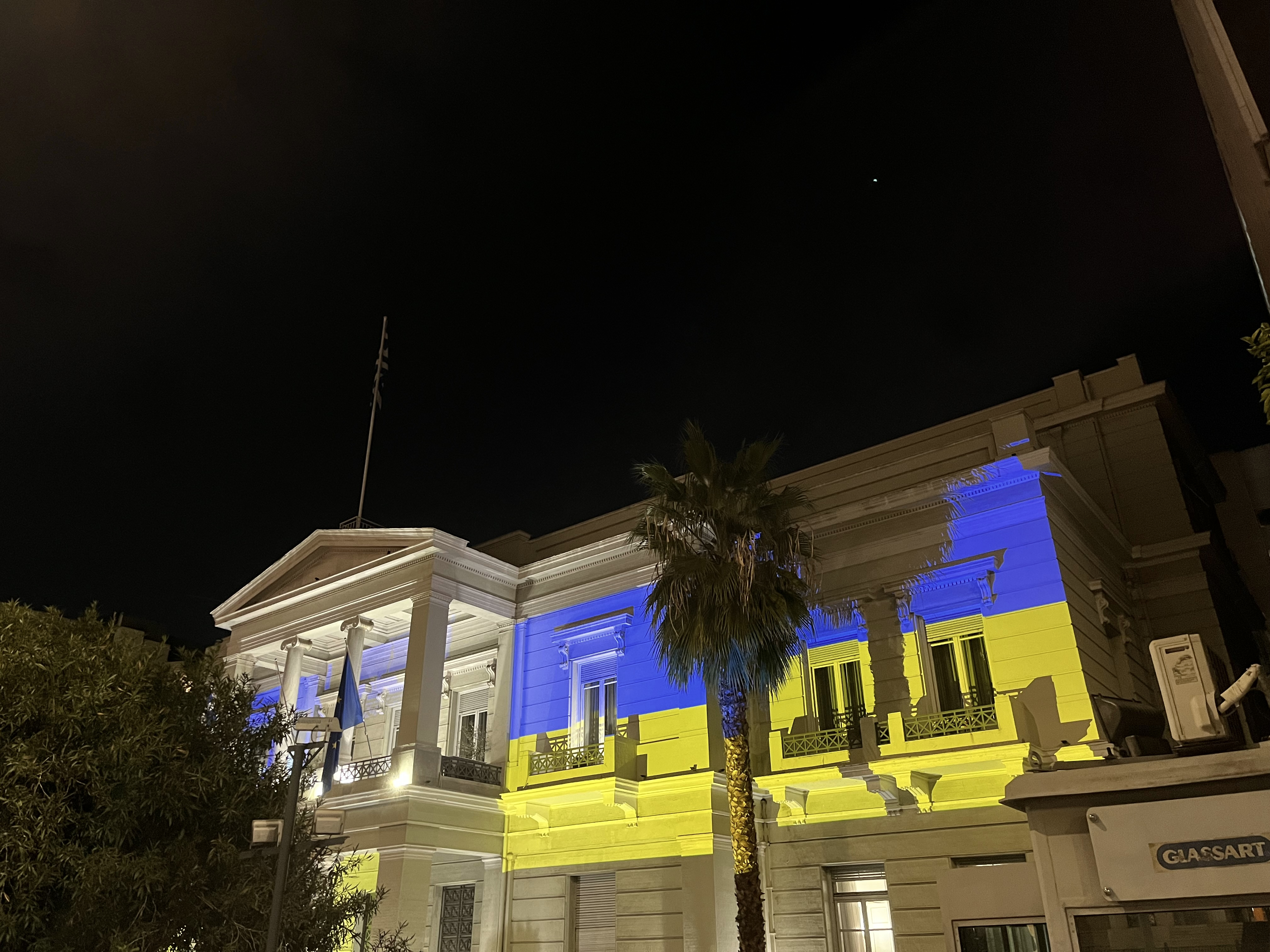
Illumination of the building of the Foreign Affairs Ministry of Greece, on the day of the 2nd anniversary of the invasion of Russia in Ukraine.

Several of the cities in southern and eastern Ukraine were given Greek names toward the end of the 18th century, due to Russia having sought to tap into the respectability of ancient Greek heritage in the Black Sea after having acquired the northern territories controlled by Turkey through the 1774 Treaty of Küçük Kaynarca.

== List of bilateral agreements ==
- Friendship and Cooperation Agreement between the Hellenic Republic and Ukraine (1997).
- Agreement on Economic, Industrial, Scientific and Technological Cooperation.
- Agreement on the Promotion and Mutual Protection of Investments.
- Agreement on the Avoidance of Double Taxation
- Agreement on International Road Transport.
- Shipping Agreement.
- Agreement on Judicial Assistance in Civil Matters.

== List of bilateral visits ==
- November 1996, President of Ukraine, Leonid Kuchma visited Greece
- December 1997, President of Greece, Konstantinos Stephanopoulos visited Ukraine
- April 2001, Prime Minister of Ukraine, Viktor Yushchenko visited Greece
- July 2002, Prime Minister of Greece, Costas Simitis visited Ukraine
- September 2007, President of Ukraine, Viktor Yushchenko visited Greece
- April 2008, President of Greece, Karolos Papoulias visited Ukraine
- October 2011, President of Ukraine, Viktor Yanukovych visited Greece

== Diplomacy ==
Embassy of Ukraine in Athens

Embassy of Greece in Kyiv

=== Hellenic Republic ===
- Kyiv (Embassy)
- Mariupol (Consulate-General)
- Odesa (Consulate-General)

=== Ukraine ===
- Athens (Embassy)
- Thessaloniki (Consulate-General)

== See also ==
- Foreign relations of Greece
- Foreign relations of Ukraine
- Greeks in Ukraine
