= A Trip Without a Load =

1962 film

- Directed by: Vladimir Vengerov
- Written by: Sergei Antonov
- Starring: Georgi Yumatov; Aleksandr Demyanenko; Tamara Syomina
- Cinematography: Genrikh Marandzhyan
- Release date: 1962
- Running time: 85 minutes
- Country: Soviet Union
- Language: Russian

A Trip Without a Load (Russian: Порожний рейс, romanized: Porozhniy reys) is a 1962 Soviet drama film directed by Vladimir Vengerov. It was entered into the 3rd Moscow International Film Festival at the last moment (instead of the film We, Two of Men) and won a Silver Prize.

== Plot ==
A young novice Muscovite journalist, Pavel Sirotkin, (Aleksandr Demyanenko) is assigned to write an article on the editorial board of the northern timber industry driver, leading toiler Nikolay Khromov (Georgi Yumatov). Ending up in the harsh winter conditions of work and life, at first Sirotkin by chance is confronted merely with negative developments, and then with outright fraud in the timber industry. Front-rank Khromov is a shrewd operator who deftly manipulates the mileage account, and the company's director Akim Sevastyanovich (Anatoliy Papanov) is a cunning and resourceful chief for whom implementation of the plan at any price is a principle of leadership. The journalist is to choose between precise execution of the assigned task or staying true to his principles.

After gathering enough facts about the activities of some self-serving timber industry workers which is sufficient for a devastating exposé, Sirotkin notifies Akim Sevastyanovich. Director of the forestry administration tries to dissuade Pavel in his findings. When this does not work, he gives Khromov the task of driving Sirotkin by car to the district center, hinting that he is interested in the disappearance of the journalist.

It seems that fate gives a chance to Khromov to bury all evidence of his misdeeds with impunity. It is possible to just leave the inexperienced urban dweller in the snow-covered taiga far from settlements and let him freeze to death. The moral conflict of the journalist and chauffeur approaches critical mass. But suddenly the truck runs out of gasoline because of a malfunction and stops in the middle of the frozen river and the vast plains. The short day passes, the snowstorm begins and the long night is approaching, the temperature drops to minus 40 degrees Celsius. Khromov and Sirotkin face the prospect of freezing to death before they are found or to survive at any cost. This situation manifests the true psychological and human qualities of each man.

== Cast ==
- Georgi Yumatov as Nikolay Khromov, the driver
- Aleksandr Demyanenko as Pavel Sirotkin, journalist
- Tamara Syomina as Arina, accounting clerk of the forest industry
- German Kachin as Viktor Kryukov, the driver
- Svetlana Kharitonova as Tonya, Viktor Kryukov's wife
- Anatoliy Papanov as Akim Sevastyanovich, director of the forest industry
- Boris Chirkov as old man at the aerodrome
- Irina Gubanova as doctor (uncredited)
