= Kapnist family =

Noble family

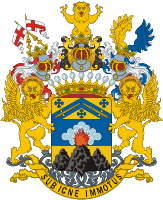
Coat of arms of the Russian branch of the family

Coat of arms of the Venetian branch of the family

The Kapnist family was a noble family of the Russian Empire originating from the Ukrainian Cossack nobility of the Hetmanate. Its founder's ancestor was a Greek merchant from Zakynthos. The family belongs to a historic Greek noble family with origins on the island of Zakynthos, dating back to the 15th century. A branch of the family (Kapnisis in Greek or Capnissi in Italian) gained the title of Count and became part of the Venetian nobility. This branch remained in Greece and rose to prominence in the country's political affairs.

== Notable members ==
- Vasyl Kapnist (died 1757) - Izium sotnyk (1726), participant of the Crimean campaigns of 1736 and 1738, Myrhorod colonel from 1737, commander of Sloboda Regiments, fallen at the Battle of Groß-Jägersdorf during the Seven Years' War.
  - Mykola Kapnist - Marshal of Nobility in Ekaterinoslav Governorate (1795)
  - Petro Kapnist (early 1750s—1826), guards starshina and landowner of Khorol povit, promoter of republican ideas.
  - Vasily Kapnist (c. 1756–1823) - classical poet and civic activist, marshal of nobility of Kiev Governorate (1785-1787).
    - Ivan Kapnist (c. 1794-1860) - marshal of nobility of Poltava Governorate, promoter of restoration of the Ukrainian Cossack host.
    - Oleksa Kapnist (c. 1796-1869) - marshal of nobility of Myrhorod povit, supporter of Decembrists, personal friend of Taras Shevchenko.
      - Pyotr Kapnist (1839-1904) - Russian diplomat.
    - Semen Kapnist (c. 1791-1843) - marshal of nobility of Kremenchuk povit, supporter of Decembrists.
- Maria Kapnist (1913-1993) - Ukrainian actress.

== See also ==
- Kapnist, list of people with the surname
- Greeks in Ukraine
