= The City Turns the Lights On =

1958 film

- Russian: Город зажигает огни
- Directed by: Vladimir Vengerov
- Written by: Viktor Nekrasov; Vladimir Vengerov
- Starring: Nikolay Pogodin; Elena Dobronravova; Oleg Borisov; Liliya Aleshnikova; Yuriy Lyubimov
- Cinematography: Genrikh Marandzhyan
- Edited by: Valentina Mironova
- Music by: Oleg Karavaychuk
- Release date: 1958
- Running time: 97 minute
- Country: Soviet Union
- Language: Russian

The City Turns the Lights On (Russian: Город зажигает огни) is a 1958 Soviet drama film directed by Vladimir Vengerov.

== Plot ==
The film tells about the former intelligence officer, Nikolay Mityasov, who as a result of his injury returns to his hometown and learns that his wife Shura has betrayed him. Nikolai is in despair, but everything changes when he meets Valentina...

== Cast ==
- Nikolay Pogodin as Nikolai Mityasov
- Elena Dobronravova as Valya
- Oleg Borisov as Sergey Yeroshin
- Liliya Aleshnikova as Shura Mityasova
- Pavel Usovnichenko as Khokhryakov
- Yuriy Lyubimov as Alexey Ivanovich Boykov
- Aleksandr Sokolov as Professor Nikoltsev
- Valentin Grudinin as Gromoboy
- Boris Arakelov as Lyovka Khorol
- Alisa Freindlich as Zina Pichikova
