= The Golden Eshelon =

- Russian: Золотой эшелон
- Directed by: Ilya Gurin
- Written by: Leonid Tur; Pyotr Tur
- Starring: Vasiliy Shukshin; Elena Dobronravova; Harijs Liepins; Pavel Usovnichenko; Stepan Krylov
- Cinematography: Militsa Bogatkova
- Edited by: Lidiya Zhuchkova
- Music by: Qara Qarayev
- Release date: 1959
- Running time: 101 minute
- Country: Soviet Union
- Language: Russian

The Golden Eshelon (Russian: Золотой эшелон) is a 1959 Soviet war film directed by Ilya Gurin.

== Plot ==
The film takes place in 1919 in Siberia, during the civil war. Kolchak wants to take gold out of Russia. The Bolsheviks are doing everything possible to prevent it.

== Cast ==
- Vasiliy Shukshin as Andrey Nizovtsev (as V. Shukshin)
- Elena Dobronravova as Nadya (as Ye. Dobronrarova)
- Harijs Liepins as István (as G. Liepins)
- Pavel Usovnichenko as Aleksey Bilinkin (as P. Usovnichenko)
- Stepan Krylov as Nikanor Ivanovich (as S. Krylov)
- Valentina Belyaeva as Serafima Ivanovna (as V. Belyayeva)
- Arkadi Trusov as Lipat Korneyevich (as A. Trusov)
- Syui Sao-Chzhun as Li Chan
