= Baltic Skies =

1960 film

- Russian: Балтийское небо
- Directed by: Vladimir Vengerov
- Written by: Nikolai Chukovsky
- Starring: Pyotr Glebov; Vsevolod Platov; Mikhail Ulyanov; Rolan Bykov; Mikhail Kozakov
- Cinematography: Genrikh Marandzhyan
- Edited by: Stera Gorakova
- Music by: Isaac Schwarts
- Release date: 1960
- Running time: 163 minute
- Country: Soviet Union
- Language: Russian

Baltic Skies (Russian: Балтийское небо) is a 1960 Soviet World War II film directed by Vladimir Vengerov.

The film tells about military pilots defending Leningrad during World War II.

== Plot ==
The film portrays the Siege of Leningrad, focusing on the dramatic events of 1941 and the spring of 1942. At the center of the story is the fate of a squadron of Polikarpov I-16 fighter planes from one of the regiments of the Soviet Baltic Fleet Air Force, commanded by Captain Rassokhin (played by Mikhail Ulyanov). The squadron faces heavy losses, with comrades such as Baiseyitov and Commissar Kabankov falling in battle. Captain Rassokhin himself is killed, and his position is taken over by Major Lunin, a former civilian aviation pilot who has recently arrived at the front.

The film also introduces a diverse cast of characters, including Kuznetsov, played by Pavel Luspekayev. Kuznetsov is a troubled pilot who was expelled from military school for alcohol abuse but redeems himself through his bravery at the front, ultimately sacrificing his life in battle.

A significant subplot revolves around the love story between young Leningrader Sonya (played by Lyudmila Gurchenko) and pilot Tatarenko (played by Oleg Borisov). Sonya’s life is marked by personal tragedy—she loses her mother and grandfather, leaving her to care for her 9-year-old brother. Despite her youth, the harsh realities of the blockade force her to mature quickly. Her meeting with Tatarenko becomes a turning point, giving her a renewed sense of purpose.

Tatarenko, a skilled and courageous pilot, is wounded in battle but recovers in a hospital and returns to the front to replace his fallen comrades. For Sonya and Tatarenko, the war stretches ahead for two more long years. Yet amidst the hardships, they find fleeting moments of hope, walking together through Leningrad’s white nights—a city that, despite the horrors of war, embodies their youth, resilience, and dreams of victory.

== Cast ==
- Pyotr Glebov as Lunin (as P. Glebov)
- Vsevolod Platov as Serov (as V. Platov)
- Mikhail Ulyanov as Rassokhin (as M. Ulyanov)
- Rolan Bykov as Kabankov (as R. Rolan)
- Mikhail Kozakov as Bayseitov (as M. Kazakov)
- Pavel Luspekayev as Kuznetsov
- Nikolai Klyuchnev as Chepyolkin (as N. Klyuchnev)
- Eve Kivi as Khikda (as E. Kivi)
- Inna Kondrateva as Mariya Sergeyevna (as I. Kondrateva)
