= Tavriya =

1959 film by Yuriy Lysenko

- Russian: Таврия
- Directed by: Yuriy Lysenko
- Written by: Oles Gonchar; Yuriy Lysenko
- Starring: Dmitriy Kapka; Maria Kapnist; Olga Lysenko; Yuri Maksimov; Ivan Ryzhov; Larisa Shepitko
- Cinematography: Vladimir Vojtenko
- Music by: Heorhiy Maiboroda
- Production company: Dovzhenko Film Studio
- Release date: 1959
- Running time: 91 min.
- Country: Soviet Union
- Language: Russian

Tavriya (Russian: Таврия) is a 1959 Soviet drama film directed by Yuriy Lysenko. Based on the novel of the same name by Oles Honchar.

== Plot ==
Taurida Governorate, Falz-Fein steppe empire. The fates of the two friends Vusti and Hanna are different: Vostya fell in love with the revolutionary Leonid Bronnikov and she herself decided to follow his path. Hanna's dream is to become rich. She falls in love with the son of the Falz-Fein millionaires. But the maid fails to become a mistress: the landowner Sophia Falz-Fein drives Hanna out of the estate. Hard working conditions at work in the landlord economies give rise to solidarity and strong friendship between Russians and Ukrainians. They rebel against their oppressor landowner Falz-Fein.

== Cast ==
- Dmitriy Kapka as old man Levko
- Maria Kapnist as Hegumeness
- Olga Lysenko as Vustya
- Yuri Maksimov as Leonid Bronnikov
- Ivan Ryzhov as Mokeich
- Larisa Shepitko as Ganna
- Oleg Zhakov as Ivan Timofeevich Murashko
- Natalia Gitserot as Sophia Falz-Fein
