= We, Two of Men =

- Directed by: Yuriy Lysenko
- Written by: Anatoly Kuznetsov
- Starring: Vasily Shukshin; Valeriy Korol
- Cinematography: Sergei Lisetsky
- Music by: Evgeny Zubtsov
- Production company: Dovzhenko Film Studios
- Release date: 1962 (Soviet Union)
- Running time: 84 minutes
- Country: Soviet Union
- Languages: mainly Russian, partially Ukrainian

We, Two of Men (Russian: Мы, двое мужчин, romanized: My, dvoe muzhchin) is a Soviet feature film of 1962 directed by Yuriy Lysenko. The script was written by Anatoly Kuznetsov based on his story Yurka from the Pantless Team.

The film was released when it was made, but after Kuznetsov emigrated in 1969 it was banned, and was not shown for a long time after that.

== Plot ==
In the Ukrainian hinterland, the GAZ-51 lorry driver Mishka Gorlov is assigned to make a trip to the city to get a transformer. Before leaving he is approached by a teacher, who asks him to take her son Yurka along so that he can buy a school suit. The rude and scandalous driver reluctantly agrees. On a journey full of unexpected situations and adventures, the difficult Mishka and the small but independent Yurka quickly find a common language, largely due to the fact that both of them grew up without a father. Mishka begins to rethink his unlucky bachelor life.

== Principal actors ==
- Vasily Shukshin - Mishka Gorlov, lorry driver
- Valeriy Korol - Yurka, the teacher's son
- Vladimir Dalsky - clothes seller
- Dzhemma Osmolovskaya - pregnant woman
- Vera Predayevich - teacher, Yurka's mother
- Boris Saburov - collective farm chairman
- Valentin Grudinin - Mishka's drinking buddy
- Maria Kapnist - passenger with a goose

== Crew ==
- Script writer: Anatoly Kuznetsov
- Director: Yuriy Lysenko
- Cameraman: Sergei Lisetsky
- Art director: Nikolai Reznik
- Composer: Evgeny Zubtsov
- The orchestra of the Kyiv Conservatory named after P. I. Tchaikovsky

Conductor Veniamin Tolba

== Production ==
The shooting took place in regions of Ukraine and in Kyiv.

According to Anatoly Kuznetsov, who really liked the film, We, Two of Men along with the propaganda film Meet Baluyev! were selected for presentation at the Moscow International Film Festival in 1963, but at the last moment the film We, Two of Men was replaced with another one, A Trip Without a Load, without announcing the reason.
