= Pyotr Kapnist =

Russian diplomat

Pyotr Alekseyevich Kapnist
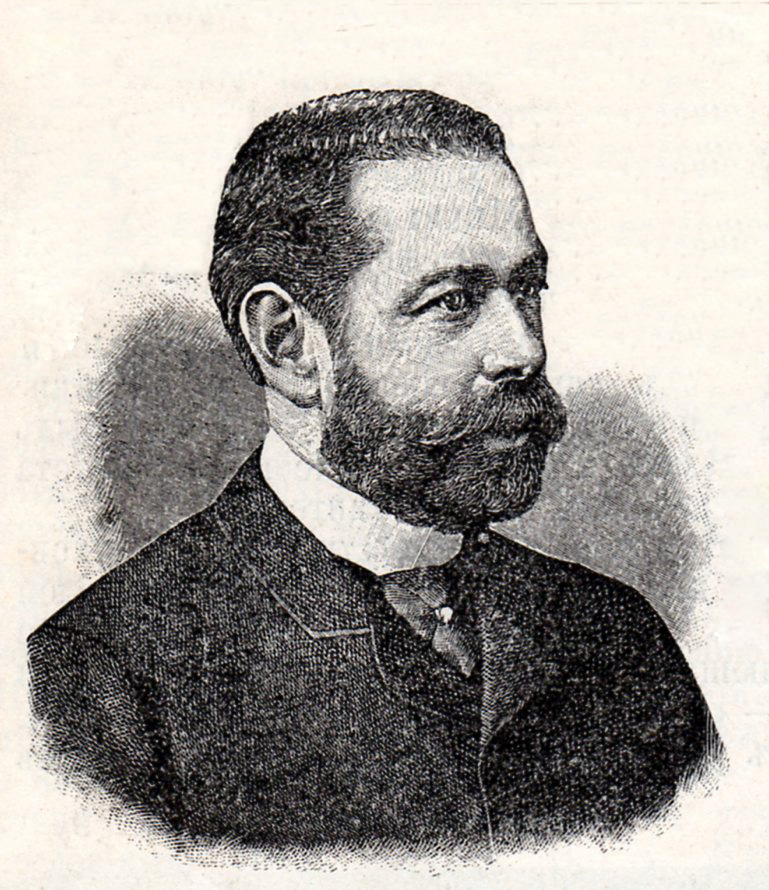

Russia Ambassador to Austria
- In office 1895–1904
- Preceded by: Aleksey Borisovich Lobanov-Rostovsky
- Succeeded by: Lev Pavlovich Urusov

Personal details
- Born: 7 September 1839
- Died: 2 December 1904 (aged 65)

Count Pyotr Alekseyevich Kapnist (Russian: Пётр Алексе́евич Капни́ст; 7 September 1839 – 2 December 1904) was a Russian diplomat and ambassador. In late 1884 and early 1885 he participated as the Russian representative in the Berlin Conference. From 1895 to 1904, he was Russian ambassador to Austria-Hungary.

== See also ==
- Kapnist family

Political offices
| Preceded by Aleksey Borisovich Lobanov-Rostovsky | Russian Ambassador to Austria; 1895–1904 | Succeeded by Lev Pavlovich Urusov |
