= Vladimir Vengerov =

Russian film director (1920–1997)

- Born: Vladimir Yakovlevich Vengerov; 11 January 1920; Saratov, RSFSR
- Died: 15 November 1997 (aged 77); Saint Petersburg, Russia
- Occupations: Film director, screenwriter
- Years active: 1951–1985

Vladimir Yakovlevich Vengerov (Russian: Владимир Яковлевич Венгеров; 11 January 1920 – 15 November 1997) was a Soviet and Russian film director and screenwriter. He directed fourteen films between 1951 and 1985. People's Artist of the RSFSR (1978). His 1962 film A Trip Without a Load was entered into the 3rd Moscow International Film Festival where it won a Silver Prize.

== Filmography ==
- The Forest (1953; co-directed with Semyon Timoshenko)
- Two Captains (1955)
- The City Turns the Lights On (1958)
- Baltic Skies (1960)
- A Trip Without a Load (1962)
- Workers' Settlement (1965)
- The Living Corpse (1968)
- Rupture (1983)
