= Borys Todurov =

Ukrainian doctor, heart surgeon, and professor

Borys Todurov Борис Тодуров
- Born: 2 January 1965 (age 61); Kyiv
- Occupations: Doctor, cardiac surgeon
- Website: facebook.com/btodurov

Borys Todurov (Ukrainian: Борис Тодуров; born 2 January 1965, Kyiv) is a Ukrainian cardiac surgeon, professor, honoured doctor of Ukraine, director of The Heart Institute, public figure, and blogger. He carried out the first heart transplant in Ukraine. He is an advocate of economics-based healthcare management and transplant science.

== Biography ==
Borys Todurov was born in Kyiv on 2 January 1965. His father was Mikhail Ivanovich Todurov, who was an assistant locomotive driver. His mother was Nina Ivanovna Todurova, a rural doctor. Both were from Yalta village. his brother is Ivan Todurov. His wife is Olena Todurova, with two children, Mikhail and Natalia.

From 2000 to 2003, he was the Head of the Department of Transplantation and Heart Surgery with a group of extra corporeal technologies and biomaterials, Shalimov National Institute of Surgery and Transplantology, Kyiv

From 2003 to 2006, he was the Deputy Director for Transplantology, Shalimov National Institute of Surgery and Transplantology, Kyiv

From 2006 to 2008, he was Initiator and co-author of a project on construction of the most modern medical facility in Kyiv - the Kyiv City Heart Center.

From 2008 to 2013, he was the Head of City Clinical Hospital "The Kyiv Heart Center".

From 2013 to the present, he is the Director of The Heart Institute of the Ministry of Health of Ukraine (formerly The Kyiv Heart Center), Kyiv.

From September 2016 to the present, he is the Head of the Department of Cardiac Surgery, Roentgen-Endovascular and Extracorporeal Technologies of Shupyk National Medical Academy of Postgraduate Education.

In December 2016, he was recognised as the "Person of the Year" according to Novoye Vremya Magazine for saving lives and innovating in medicine.

In January 2017, he came under an information attack from a team carrying out efforts on behalf of acting Minister Ulyana Suprun. He received an invitation from two clinics from the European Union and one from Georgia to relocate the entire clinical team, but refused to leave Ukraine.

== Activity as a doctor ==
Borys Todurov has 30 years of experience as a cardiac surgeon. During this time, he carried out more than 5 thousand surgical operations.

In 2000, he performed a heart transplant, the first in Ukraine.

In 2001, for the first time in Ukraine, he conducted the Batista procedure (an alternative to heart transplantation).

The same year, for the first time in Ukraine, he carried out a thoracoscopic surgery for a child with congenital heart disease.

In 2002, for the first time in Ukraine, he made a thrombectomy from the inferior vena cava in a complex with nephrectomy under the conditions of artificial circulation.

From 2000 to 2007, he performed four heart transplants, three of which were successful.

On 12 July 2016, Borys Todurov for the first time in Ukraine, conducted the implantation of an artificial heart. This cost of the device, reported to be EUR 120K, was covered by a German clinic though an installment plan to The Heart Institute, owing to Todurov's reputation amongst international cardiac surgeons. Part of the funds was collected at a charity race and through a crowdfunding platform. There were no state funds spent to implement this innovation. Nevertheless, President Poroshenko in his New Year's greetings speech noted the artificial heart transplantation as one of the top country's achievements in 2016.

== Prevention ==
Boris Todurov is an active blogger on the topic of cardiovascular prevention. Since 2016, he manages his own YouTube channel, as well as a column at the tabloid Ukrainska Pravda. He promotes a healthy lifestyle and heart check-up at least as often as Ukrainians make checkups for their cars.

== International peacekeeping missions ==
In 1999, B. Todurov organized the humanitarian mission to Egypt, providing surgery in Cairo for 16 children with congenital heart disease.

In 2002, Todurov visited Iraq, where he worked on creating a joint Ukrainian-Iraqi project to save children. As a part of this mission, he provided surgery in Baghdad for two children with congenital heart disease.

In 2005, Todurov organised a humanitarian mission to Kosovo. There he performed three operations for children with congenital heart disease.

2006 - humanitarian mission to Azerbaijan. He provided congenital heart disease surgery for five children from low-income refugee families from the Nagorno-Karabakh conflict region.

In March 2014 he organised a humanitarian mission to Crimea, a week before it was occupied by Russian military troops. Todurov with his team of surgeons and anaesthesiologists attempted to maintain the medical facilities of Feodosia military base, which was besieged by Russians at that time. Doctors brought medications and ambulance dressings in case of military combat. On leaving the Crimea peninsula, Todurov was asked to operate on an elderly woman with acute myocardial infarction. Later it turned out that the patient was the mother of Sergei Aksyonov, the self-proclaimed Minister of the Crimea.

== The Heart Institute ==
The Heart Institute of the Ministry of Health of Ukraine provides highly specialized assistance to patients with cardiovascular pathology and surgical care for patients with heart defects. It was created in 2008 as the city clinical hospital "The Kyiv Heart Center" following the instance of the German clinic Herzzentrum, the German Cardiology Center in Munich.

On 26 December 2013 Todurov influenced to change the communal ownership to the national one, with Ministry of Health as executor of the estate. This change helped to save The Heart Center from intentional bankruptcy and privatization from the side of state officials.

Every year The Heart Institute provides medical care to patients from all regions of Ukraine. In 2016 Institute performed the most cardiac surgeries in the country - 5940, being ahead of the Amosov Heart Institute and Strazhesko Institute of Cardiology.

Each third CABG operation in Ukraine takes place at The Heart Institute (1,436 operations, for comparison at the Amosov Institute - 844 operations). Each third stent in Ukraine is installed in The Heart Institute (2593 interventions; for comparison at Amosov Institute with 449).

At The Heart Institute, Todurov organized internal eHealth system and quality management system. As a result, the percentage of unsuccessful operations is lower than in the average clinic in Europe and does not reach 1%. This result made it possible for the institute to become in 2015 the first hospital in the CIS which met the requirements of international medical accreditation from the British company QHA Trent. The availability of this certificate gives to foreign insurance companies the basis to pay for the treatment of foreign citizens at The Heart Institute. In 2016 patients came from Azerbaijan, Greece, Israel, United States, Moldova, Kyrgyzstan, Turkmenistan, Turkey, Libya and other countries.

The institute is a permanent partner of the Diplomatic Corps stationed in Ukraine. It helped many foreign delegates and members of their families. In December 2016, the mother of the US Ambassador Marie Yovanovitch was operated on at The Heart Institute.

At the entrance to The Heart Institute, along with the flag of Ukraine and the corporate flag, there is the flag of the Crimean Mejlis. Mustafa Dzhemilev knelt before this flag during his visit to the Institute.

The Heart Institute has been the object of encroachment by political figures repeatedly.

== Support in the Anti-terroristic operation (ATO) zone ==
Borys Todurov has visited the combat operational zone more than 10 times since the beginning of the war in the Donbass region of Ukraine. There he conducts surgeries on the spot and makes charitable donations of medicines and military uniforms to Ukrainian soldiers. In the summer of 2014, he visited Slovyansk, Donetsk region. Doctors brought medicines and took three wounded warriors for treatment at The Heart Institute. In addition, Borys Todurov makes surgery for civilians from the ATO zone. He conducts advisory receptions in Kramatorsk, Bakhmut, Severodonetsk and Lysychansk.

In Donetsk and Lugansk regions, all highly specialized medical institutions of the cardiological profile remained on territories under occupation (ORDLO), and people left without healthcare. To solve the problem Todurov for his own money organised preparations for launching the branches of The Heart Institute in both regions. As an argument, it was stated that it was possible to follow the example of Cleveland Clinic (USA) and to spread the expertise of a well-established center in other regions. However, the Acting Minister Suprun and her team did not allow the activity of the branches, referring to the discrepancy with the plans for the decentralization reform.

There are reports on social media on 10 November 2023 of Borys Todurov having been conscripted into the Ukrainian army working as a doctor.

== Civil position ==
Borys Todurov believes that Ukrainian cardiac surgeons are indebted to their patients. Despite a national need for 200 thousand angiographic procedures and stentings, only 15% are performed.

Repeatedly Borys Todurov has spoken out against the imperfection of the existing system of managing healthcare.

In 2011, he entered into a public debate with Health Minister Ilya Yemets (21 December 2010 – 17 May 2011) in the context of healthcare reform. As a response, Yemets tried to lower the rank of The Heart Institute from high-level cardiac care facility to an ordinary hospital for the treatment of patients with myocardial infarction or stroke.

The cardiac surgeon made public statements that the "people" of Kyiv's mayor Chernovetsky asked for a bribe - 30% of the clinic's revenue. Todurov was one of the few able to repulse the enforcers from the criminal family of Yanukovych and Bohatyryova, who tried to get as a bribe a sum equal to 30% of the national cardiovascular program.

Also, Borys Todurov publicly commented on the inactivity of Minister Sandro Kvitashvili on the issue of health care reform.

Todurov is the active advocate for urgent human organ transplantation reform. He publicly criticised the head of the Parliament Health Committee Dr. Olga Bogomolets and Committee deputy Oksana Korchynska. According to him, "Ukrainian legislation prevents organ transplanting and, thereby, saving lives of many people."

Before voting in the Verkhovna Rada, Todurov recorded a video message to the parliament members on supporting the Law on Transplantation.

In a video he stated that his organs are settled for transplantation upon his death.

On 13 November 2016, on the TV show “The Cabinets” on Channel 5 Todurov made a negative response on results of Health Minister Suprun's team.

On 1 January 2017 Todurov published a video message criticising the activities of Ministry of Health. The video collected about 500,000 views on the Facebook and YouTube, and was the reason for the large-scale campaign against the cardiac surgeon from the pharmaceutical lobbyists and supporters of the acting Minister Suprun.

In his video, Todurov criticised the failure of procurement of cardiovascular medical supplies with the budget of 2016 up until the year ended (₴364 million). According to his calculations, they could save tens of thousands of lives. The team of the Ministry of Health, headed by the acting Minister of Health Ulyana Suprun did not accomplish the procurement. As a result, in early 2017 Ukrainian patients didn't have the necessary drugs and supplies.

One of Todurov's reasons was that the procurement of medical supplies through international intermediaries became the outdated practice. During three years upon Maidan, the Prozorro electronic procurement system was developed. It gave the public much more transparency, reduced delays, and avoided wasting resources in the cost of the service commission of intermediaries.

Independent analytical group FactCheckUA checked Todurov's words and found that in 2015 the time between the announcement of procurement tender by international intermediaries and the delivery of drugs was 11 months. The first procurement tender on 2016 budget was announced only on 28 December 2016. FactCheck stressed that it wasn't buying drugs, as claimed by the MOH.

The analytical group also mentioned the service commission of international intermediary Crown Agents, which was engaged in the purchase of medicines. The commission amounted to 1.8 million EUR (according to the company). At the same time, if purchases were made by the Prozorro system (there is no commission with this system), then 12,874 stenting operations could be funded on the money saved, which would save the lives of 4% of the patients with acute myocardial infarction. Todurov also criticised representatives of the Ministry of Health for blocking the creation of branches of the Heart Institute in Mariupol and Severodonetsk, where patients do not have access to cardiovascular treatment.

Todurov was publicly supported by well-known medical figures including Deputy Director of the Institute of Neurosurgery Andrei Guk and director of the Endocrine Surgery Center Oleksandr Larin, as well as public people such as: Parliament Member Konstantin Yarynych, Kyiv businessman, writer and blogger Garik Korogodski, Massi Nayem, Alexandr Noinets and Oleg Musiy, Dmitry Rosenfeld.

In response to the video message of Todurov, the team of U. Suprun applied administrative pressure, announcing the re-accreditation of The Heart Institute.

On 5 January the team of Ulyana Suprun announced a crowdsourcing competition to identify non-transparent purchases in Prozorro system.

The only public participant in this flashmob was Evgenia Zakrevska, a lawyer.

On 6 January, Evgenia Zakrevska published an accusation of The Heart Institute in inflating the prices for purchasing the drug "Cefopectam".

On 6 January, Todurov denied these accusations, referring to the MOH order (No. 546) of 26 August 2015, which sets for state healthcare facilities the retail prices for this drug. They were not exceeded when purchased.

The analysis of Zakrevskaya's page showed that her account was working for four days around the clock, which indicates that the lawyer's account was conducted not by one person. During this timeframe, the posts about Borys Todurov were actively published and commented on her Facebook page. At the same time a massive cyber attack was organised against Todurov.

On 9 January 2017, Borys Todurov's official page in Facebook was blocked, then his personal account was blocked too.

On 27 January 2017 a fake page was created, called "Borys Todurov gives one of his apartments", making false claims about his “possession of several apartments”. On that page, the author ostensibly wrote that Todurov would give one of his apartments just for "repost and subscribe to this page." The page was promoted intensively on Facebook, having achieved tens of thousands of impressions. The Facebook page called "Victor Medvedchuk" published the post with words of support addressed to Boris Todurov. The investigation of journalist Alexander Noinets showed a direct link between PR-manager of Ulyana Suprun Bryan Mefford and Viktor Medvedchuk.
