= Elena Dobronravova =

Russian actress

- Born: 21 July 1932; Moscow, USSR
- Died: 24 January 1999 (aged 66); Moscow, Russia
- Occupation: Actress
- Years active: 1954–1999
- Awards: Cannes Film Festival Award for Best Actress (1955); Honored Artist of the RSFSR (1968)

Elena Borisovna Dobronravova (Russian: Елена Борисовна Добронра́вова; 21 July 1932 – 24 January 1999) was a Soviet and Russian actress. Born July 21, 1932 in Moscow in the family of artists of the Moscow Art Theatre Boris Dobronravov (1896–1949) and Maria Yulievna Dobronravova (1900–1964). She studied at the Moscow Art Theatre School (1950–1952) at the Moscow Art Theatre named after Maxim Gorky. In 1954 she graduated from the Boris Shchukin Theatre Institute (artistic director - Anna Orochko). After education Dobronravova joined the troupe of the Vakhtangov Academic Theater. Actress made her film debut in A Big Family (1954) and won Best Acting Award at 1955 Cannes Film Festival as part of ensemble. She's known for many roles in films, television and stage productions.

Elena Borisovna Dobronravova died on January 24, 1999. She was buried at the Novodevichy Cemetery near her parents.

== Selected filmography ==
Year	Title	Role	Notes
1954	A Big Family	Katya Travnikova	
1958	The City Turns the Lights On	Valya	
1959	The Golden Eshelon	Nadya	
1965	Workers' Settlement	Frosya	
1968	The Shield and the Sword	Glukhonemaya	
1970	Mission in Kabul	Yelena Fletcher-Zhdanovich	
1972	Commander of the Lucky 'Pike'	Svetlana Vedenina	
1974	Moscow, My Love	Elena Nikolaevna	
1980	Teheran 43	Miss Héral, Legraine's Assistant	
