= Vasily Kapnist =

Russian noble and poet (1758–1823)

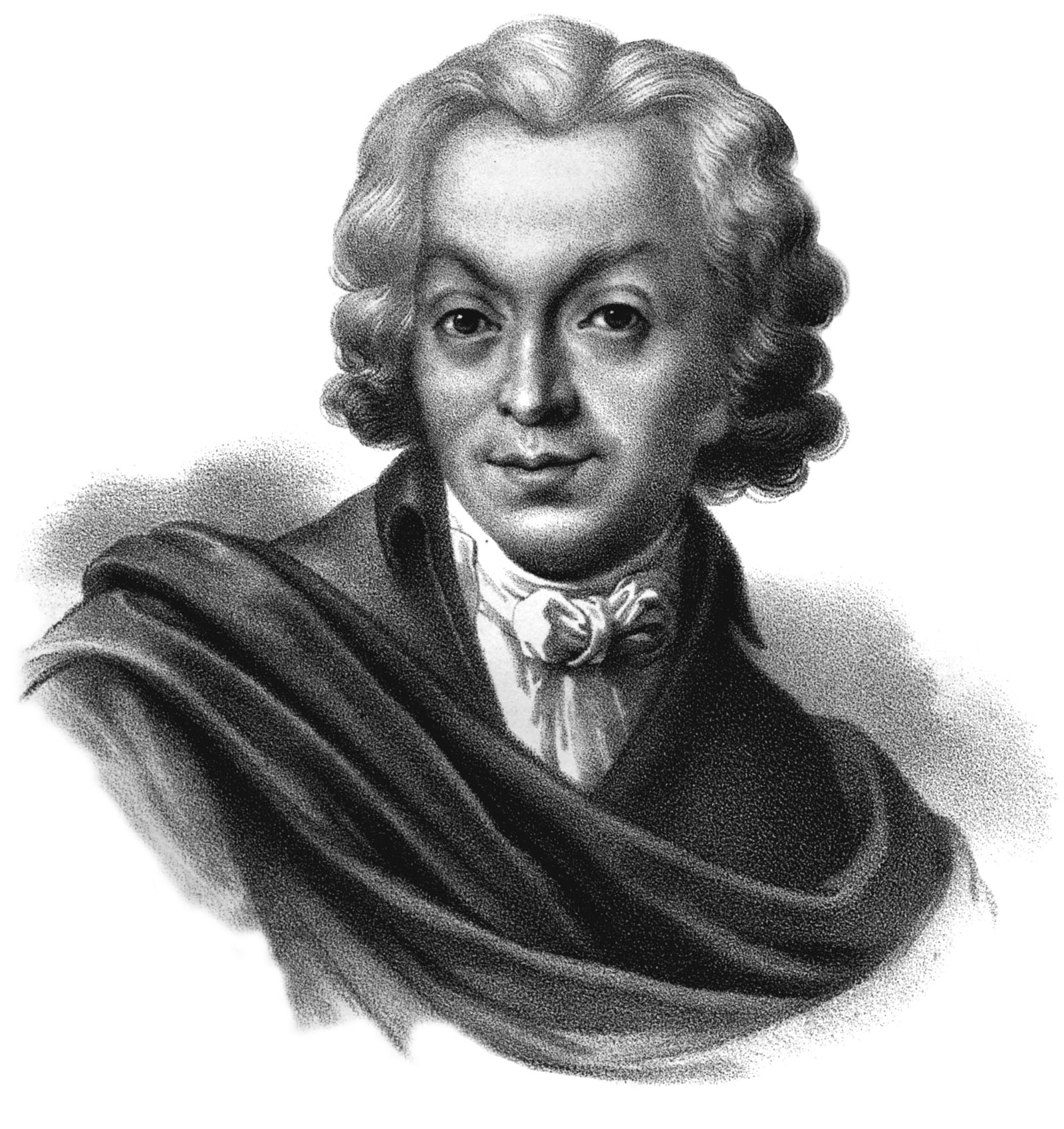
Vasily Kapnist

Count Vasily Vasilievich Kapnist (Russian: Васи́лий Васи́льевич Капни́ст, 23 February 1758 – 9 November 1823), was a Russian (Little Russian) poet, playwright and nobleman who was known as an active critic of serfdom in Russia and as a proponent of restoration of the Zaporozhian host in the region of southern Ukraine. Kapnist was the grandson of a Greek merchant from Zakynthos. He was a descendant of the noble family of Capnissi (whose name derives from the Zakynthos surname Καπνίσης, cf. Kostas Kapnisis).

Kapnist was opposed to slavery and the serfdom, writing abolitionist poems during the 1780s. In the 1790s, he satirized judges and officers of the law as corrupt thieves and extortioners. He was denounced by the Russian censors for writing "libertarian" works. His comedy style later influenced two other comedy writers, Aleksander Griboyedov and Nikolai Gogol.

In April 1791, someone named "Kapnist" had a secret meeting with the Prussian chancellor Ewald Friedrich Graf von Hertzberg, trying to persuade the Prussian government to declare war on the Russian Empire in case of an uprising of Zaporozhian Cossacks against Russian rule. Friedrich Wilhelm II refused to give his own consent for such an action. While this Kapnist has been identified with Vasily Kapnist by some historians, two of Kapnist's brothers are also possible candidates for conspiring against the Empire.

== Life and work ==
Kapnist was born in Velikaya Obukhovka in the Kiev Governorate of the Russian Empire in 1758. His paternal grandfather was a merchant of Greek origin from the island of Zakynthos, while his father was a brigadier of the Imperial Russian Army. He was a descendant of the noble family of Capnissi (whose name derives from the Zakynthos surname Καπνίσης, cf. Kostas Kapnisis). Kapnist's mother was Sophia Andreevna Dunina-Borkovskaya, a native Ukrainian, who came from a noble family.

His lifelong friendship with Nikolay Lvov and Gavrila Derzhavin date from the early 1770s, when all three served in the Leub Guard. Derzhavin later married Kapnist's sister-in-law and visited the poet and his wife in Obukhovka more than once.

The extension of serfdom in the Russian Empire dismayed Kapnist and occasioned his two most notable poems, Ode on Slavery (1783) and Ode on the Elimination of Slavery in Russia (1786), in which he chastised serfdom as the principal pest of contemporary Russian society. His later poems belong to the Horatian tradition, anticipating Russian Romanticism in their social pessimism and admiration of simple family joys.

Kapnist revealed himself as a savage satirist in his most famous work, a satirical verse drama based on the poet's litigation against a neighbour and aptly entitled Chicane (1798). His victims are the judges and officers of law, whom he paints as an unredeemed lot of thieves and extortioners. The play is in rather harsh Alexandrines but produces a powerful effect by the force of its passionate sarcasm. The poem is based on the Russian custom of state-appointed judges, whereas at the time of the Cossack Hetmanate, the judges were previously elected.

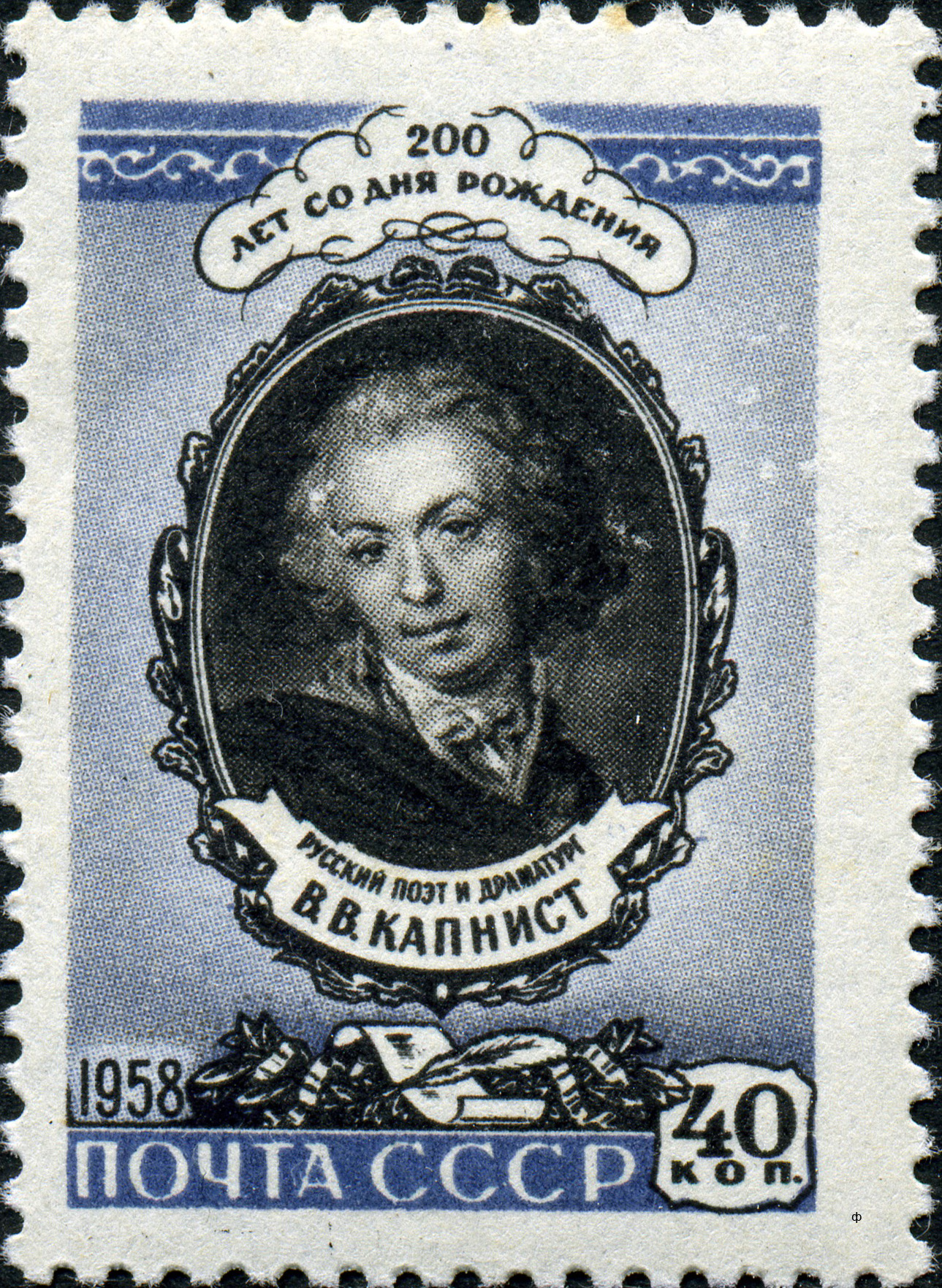
Soviet stamp 1958

Although Kapnist dedicated his play to Emperor Paul, it was denounced by the censorship as scurrilous and libertarian. Banned after only four performances, it was not revived in St. Petersburg until 1805. According to D.S. Mirsky:

The two greatest Russian comedies of the 19th century, Griboyedov's Woe from Wit and Gogol's Inspector General, owe not a little to the crude and primitive comedy of Kapnist.

== The letter to Friedrich von Hertzberg debacle ==
In 1788, Kapnist wrote a petition to Catherine the Great proposing the Empress restore the Zaporozhian host and use its soldiers in the ongoing war against Turkey. However, when the military situation improved, the imperial government refused to implement this plan.

In 1896 a Polish historian Bronisław Dembiński discovered a document, which is now known as the so-called letter to Friedrich von Hertzberg. In April 1791, someone named "Kapnist" had a secret meeting with Prussian chancellor Ewald Friedrich Graf von Hertzberg, trying to persuade the Prussian government to declare war on Russia in case of an uprising of Zaporozhian Cossacks against Russian rule. Friedrich Wilhelm II refused to give his own consent for such an action. This letter was attributed by Bronisław Dembiński to Vasily Kapnist. However it is still not clear whether Vasily Kapnist truly could be the author of this letter and it remains unclear whether the real name could be used in the document. According to Olexandr Ohloblyn two of Kapnist's brothers are also possible candidates who could have written such a letter.

== See also ==
- Kapnist family
