= Kostas Kapnisis =

Greek composer

Kostas Kapnisis (Greek: Κώστας Καπνίσης; 20 November 1920 – 4 July 2007) was a Greek composer. He was born in Athens and studied piano at the Hellenic Conservatory. He was also taught by Nikos Skalkottas.

He wrote music and soundtracks for over 100 Greek movies, documentaries and theatre.

He died in Athens in 2007.

== Sources ==
- Ανθή Γουρούντη. "Ο Κώστας Καπνίσης ως δημιουργός κινηματογραφικής μουσικής" (PDF). Ελληνική μουσική δημιουργία του 20 αιώνα για το λυρικό θέατρο και άλλες παραστατικές τέχνες. Archived from the original (PDF) on 2014-04-07.
