= Galina Khomchik =

Russian singer (born 1960)

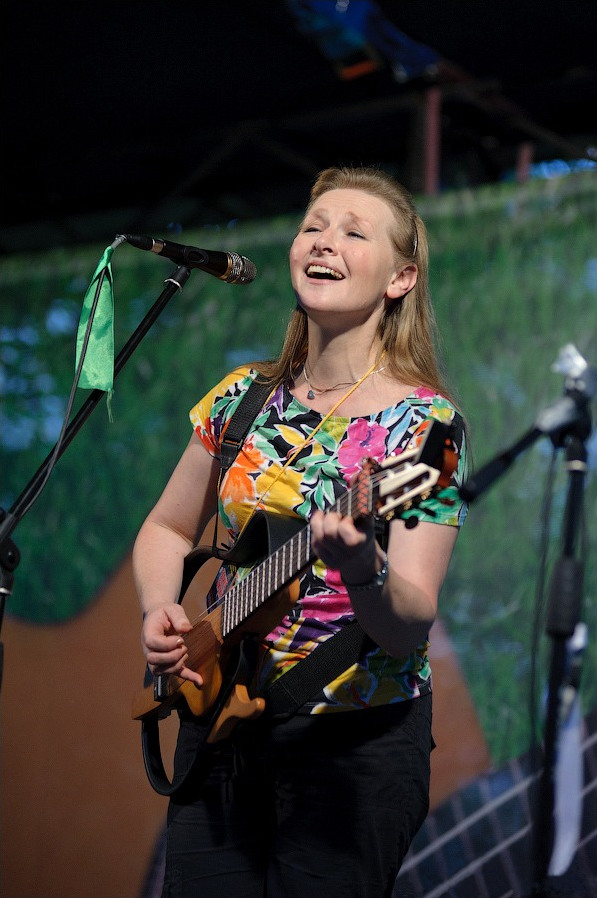

Background information
- Born: Galina Viktorovna Khomchik; May 30, 1960 (age 65)
- Origin: Moscow, USSR; Soviet Union/Russia
- Genres: Bard
- Occupations: Musician, singer, tv presenter
- Instruments: Guitar, piano
- Labels: Moskovskiye Okna, Muzprom
- Website: www.homchik.ru

Galina Khomchik (Russian: Гали′на Хо′мчик; 30 May 1960 in Moscow, USSR) is a Russian singer, acoustic guitarist and pianist, a prominent figure of the country's modern folk/bard movement. Khomchik, the three Soviet bard festivals' laureate (Moscow, 1983, The 1st National, Saratov, 1986 and V. Grushin's, Samara, 1987) and a XX Workers' Festival's golden medal winner (1984, East Berlin). A popular radio and TV presenter, she was the author of the TV series I'll Sing To You and Let's Fill With Music... and filmed an eight-part TV film on the history of the bard movement in the USSR. Khomchik is known also as director and producer of many musical videos, including those of the pop bard Oleg Mityaev. Both on her own and as a member of an all-star project Songs of Our Century she toured Europe, Australia, Israel and USA

Galina Khomchik (with a hundred songs to her repertoire, including those by Okudzhava, Vizbor, Nikitin, Kim, and Novella Matveeva urban folk classics' interpretations) released ten solo albums and features in numerous Russian modern/urban folk music compilations. She is one of just two (another being Yelena Kamburova) non-writing artists who are featured in the Most Famous Bards of Russia encyclopedia (all others being songwriters).

Novye Izvestia described Khomchik as "the star of a Russian bard music". She's been praised by Yuly Kim, Sergey Nikitin and Olga Okudzhava; singer and poet Alexander Gorodnitsky called her "a missionary of music poetry", "unequalled in this genre".

== Discography ==
- Nesckuchny Sad (Нескучный сад, 1994, Мuzprom-MO Records)
- Eternity: a Woman's View (По-женски о вечном, 1997)
- Don't leave me, Spring! (Не покидай меня, весна! 2000)
- Familiar Romantics (Знакомая романтика, 2001, Mystery of Sound Records)
- Surprise Alliance (Неожиданный альянс, 2002)
- Songs by Bulat Okujava, (Песни Булата Окуджавы, 2003)
- Moscow University: My Genius Teachers (МГУ: Мои Гениальные Учителя, 2005)
- Two Voices' Harmony (Двухголосие, 2007)
- Good and Old (Старое-доброе, 2008, First Musical Publishers)
- Songs of Yuri Visbor (Песни Юрия Визбора, 2009, IVC Records)
