= An Almost Funny Story =

- Russian: Почти смешная история
- Written by: Emil Braginsky
- Directed by: Pyotr Fomenko
- Starring: Olga Antonova; Lyudmila Arinina; Mikhail Gluzsky
- Music by: Sergey Nikitin; Viktor Berkovsky
- Country of origin: Soviet Union
- Original language: Russian

Production
- Producer: Vladimir Predybailov
- Cinematography: Felix Kefchiyan
- Editor: G. Ilyukhina
- Running time: 140 min.
- Production company: Studio Ekran

Original release
- Release: July 27, 1977

An Almost Funny Story (Russian: Почти смешная история, romanized: Pochti smeshnaya istoriya) is a 1977 Soviet two-part television film directed by Pyotr Fomenko.

== Plot ==
Two sisters, Taisia and Ilaria, arrive in the small historic town of Drevnegorsk on the Volga. The elder sister, Taisia, is an artist focused on her work, leaving all household responsibilities to her slightly eccentric, infantile younger sister, Ilaria. At the town's pier, they meet Viktor Meshkov, an engineer who offers to help carry their heavy suitcase. This encounter leads to a series of amusing events, sparking a friendship. The sisters and Viktor end up staying in the same hotel, where Viktor convinces the front desk to let the sisters occupy a colleague's room temporarily. Ilaria develops feelings for Viktor, even getting a new hairstyle to catch his eye, though he remains mostly focused on his work. Taisia disapproves of Ilaria's growing affection for Viktor, viewing it as a passing infatuation, but when she realizes Ilaria's feelings are deeper, she grows angry and confronts Viktor. Ilaria, however, sneaks out to see Viktor off at the train station.

Returning from his business trip, Viktor can't forget Ilaria, though his work and personal life—including his adult daughter Masha—keep him occupied. Meanwhile, Masha catches the interest of a quirky young man, Tolik, despite Viktor's initial irritation. During a chance encounter at a small station, Viktor and Ilaria see each other briefly but are unable to talk. Ilaria later visits Viktor in Moscow, upset that he hadn't tried to find her. After another separation, Viktor searches for her, stumbling upon Taisia's art exhibit, where he learns Ilaria's last name. He eventually invites Ilaria to meet, but a closed restaurant derails his plans. In a final, uncertain moment, Ilaria tells Viktor she'll soon leave for Drevnegorsk with her sister, returning after the November holidays. When she finally arrives back at Kazansky Station, Viktor is there to greet her, ready to carry her heavy suitcase once more, though its handle snaps again—a tender reminder of their first meeting.

== Cast ==
- Olga Antonova as Illaria Pavlovna
- Lyudmila Arinina as Taisia Pavlovna, Illaria's sister
- Mikhail Gluzsky as Viktor Meshkov
- Valentin Gaft as fellow traveler on the train
- Maria Mironova as telegraph operator
- Svetlana Kharitonova as conductor
- Lyudmila Polyakova as a client at the hairdresser
- Boris Leskin as TV master

The songs are performed by Sergey Nikitin and Tatyana Nikitina.

== Production ==
Filming took place in Yaroslavl, Plyos, Odessa, and Moscow.
