= Grushinsky festival =

Coordinates: 53°28′19″N 49°54′30″E

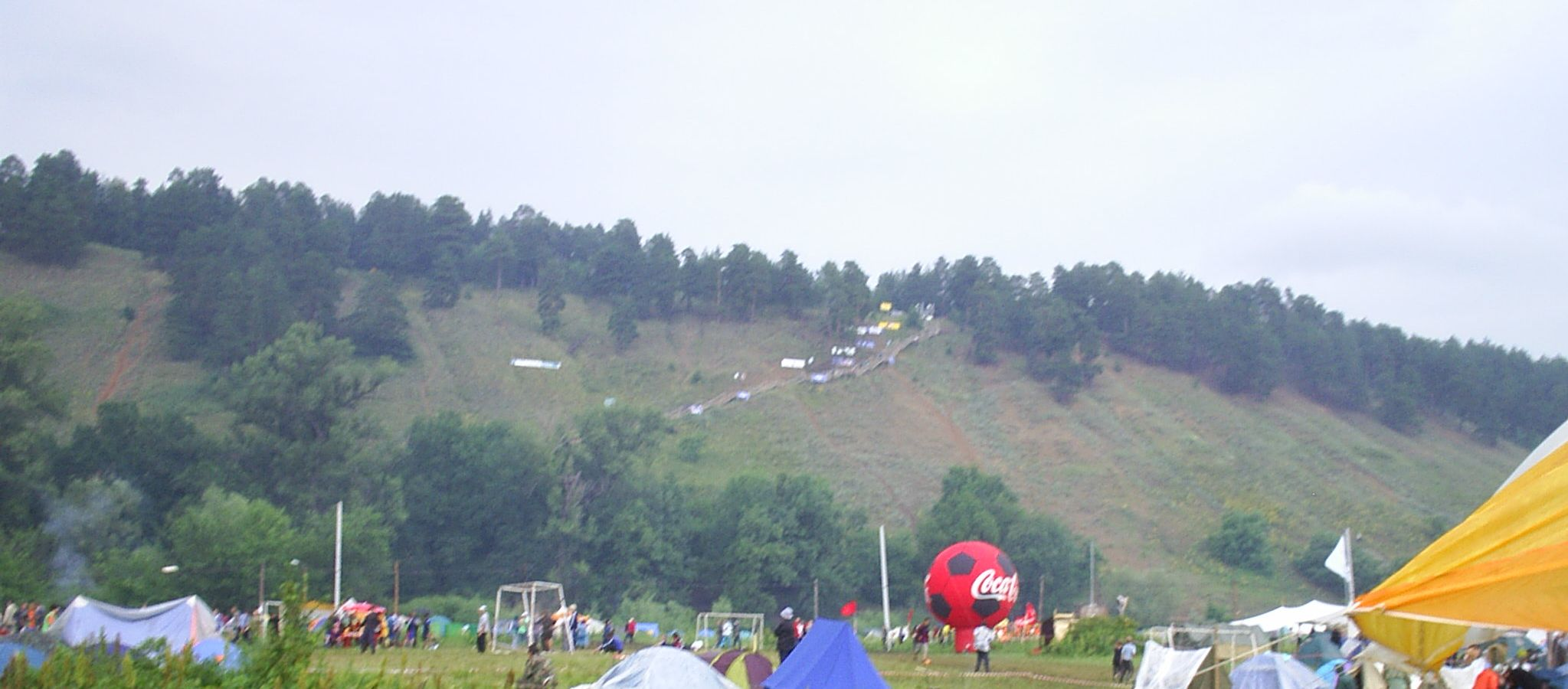
Grushin mountain, 2005

Grushinsky festival (Russian: Грушинский фестиваль) is an annual Russian bard song festival that was established in 1968. It takes place near the city of Samara, on the Mastryukovo lakes. The festival takes its name from Valeri Grushin, a singer-songwriter who died during a backcountry camping trip trying to save his drowning friends.

During Soviet times, the formal oversight of the festival was performed by VLKSM. Usual participants included Yuri Vizbor, Tatyana and Sergey Nikitins, Bulat Okudzhava, Alexander Dolsky, Oleg Mitayev, Leonid Dukhovny among others. Singer Alexander Gorodnitsky was festival's long-term director.

The major landmark of the festival is the stage built on the raft, in the shape of a guitar, with its fingerboard serving as a bridge to the shore. The Grushin Mountain ridge serves as natural stands for thousands of visitors. The number of visitors, as well as of participants, increased every year, starting from only 600 in 1968 to 2,500 next year, and the peak of Soviet era Grushinsky was reached in 1979 - 100,000 spectators. This record was broken in modern times: 1997 festival attracted 140,000 spectators. Similarly, the number of artists in 1969 was 20, and in 1976 it grew up to 143.

In 1980 the fest was cancelled and was resumed only in 1986. Since then it has become a regular annual event.

In the late 1990s, the festival became commercialized, and broadened its format larger than only bard songs. Some Russian rockers, such as Yuri Shevchuk of DDT, now perform there as well.

Since 2007 Grushinsky has split into two rival festivals of the same name. The main promoter of the fest, the Grushin Club, has moved to a venue near Tolyatti. The festival at Mastryukovo lakes is still held without their promotion.
