= Lushnikov =

Lushnikov (Russian: Лушников) is a surname. Notable people with the surname include:

- Alexey Lushnikov (born 1966), Russian painter, television host, writer, producer, documentary filmmaker, political scientist, journalist, actor and philanthropist
- Andrei Lushnikov (born 1975), Russian footballer
