= Alexey Lushnikov =

Russian talk show host (born 1966)

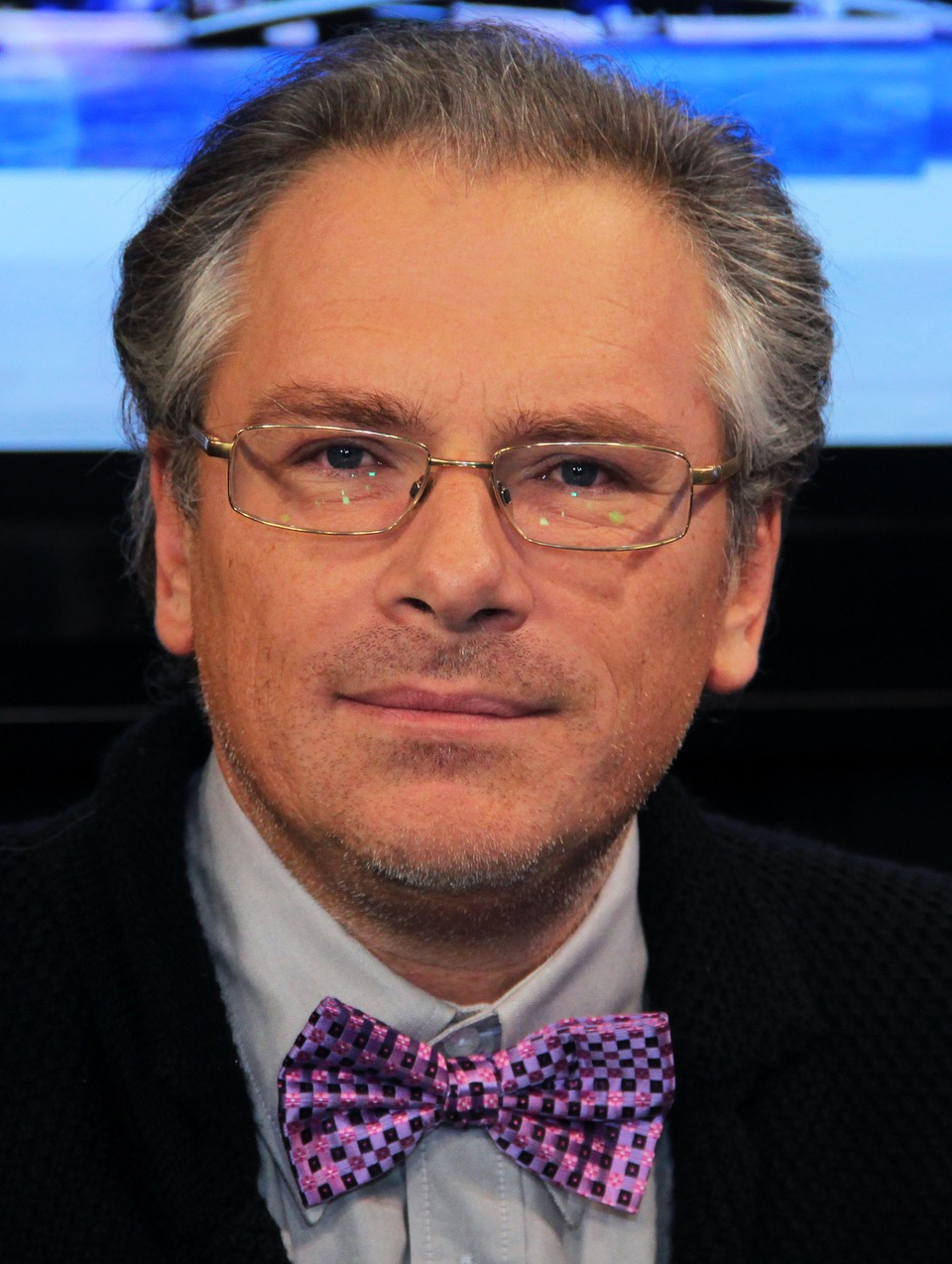
- Lushnikov, 2013
- Born: June 10, 1966 (age 60); Leningrad, USSR
- Occupations: Painter; Television host; Producer; Writer; Philanthropist
- Years active: 1987–present

Alexey Germanovich Lushnikov (Russian: Алексе́й Ге́рманович Лу́шников; born June 10, 1966) is a Russian painter, television host, writer, producer, documentary filmmaker, political scientist, journalist, actor and philanthropist. His award-winning talk show (ru) Blue Pages. Night Talk With Alexey Lushnikov was the 1st night broadcast in Saint-Petersburg. He is the Founder and owner of television channel (ru) VOT!, the only special political channel in Russia, and (ru) National Encyclopedia of Personalities (Blue Pages of Russia). Lushnikov is a President of "Documentary Films Foundation", academician of "International Academy of Sciences and Arts of Paris" and State Advisor of Saint-Petersburg of the 3rd class.

== Biography ==
Lushnikov was born on June 10, 1966, in Leningrad. He graduated from Saint Petersburg State University as an historian and was educated at Admiral Makarov State Maritime Academy. In the period of Perestroika, he is dealing much with public activity, charity, social and political functions. In 1987 Lushnikov became the leader of the informal youth group which engaged in charity practice in the homes for the elderly of Strelna. Since 1988, he is the executive secretary and later on the vice-president of the board of directors of charity organization "Leningrad". In 1989 he founds the organization "Youth for Charity" and becomes its chairman. On the base of "Youth for Charity", rock-association "Bratki" (it could be translated as "bros") was created and guided by Boris Grebenshchikov. It unified more than 20 rock bands from Leningrad including "Aquariym", "DDT", "Zoopark" and others. They were touring at homes for the elderly, orphanages and played charity live shows.

After the January Events in Lithuania and Riga Lushnikov has organized the international action "Million letters to President of the USSR".

Alexey Lushnikov, the Head of the action's headquarter, deputy:

Leningrad's youth organization "Youth for Charity" conducts international action "Million letters to President of USSR" on February, from 6 until 8. We are very concerned about the campaign of reduction of democratic reforms of 1985 started by Government and President in 1990. We are very afraid of the high management of USSR's attempts to recover the order of power and publicity's ban, the order pulling the peoples of our country to civil war. In the actual political situation silence and passiveness of people are a base on which conservative forces count. Today all good-will and sober-minded people should understand that life of their children and grand children depends on their activity, civil point and skill to make a right choice.

The action was joined by a row of press media:

Newspaper "Vecherny Leningrad":

I, the citizen of USSR, express serious concern and human pain after the tragic event, that took place in Vilnius and Riga. I express concern about the possibility of reduction of democratic reforms that were started in 1985. I express the concern about the economic crisis in USSR. I appeal to you, the highest official of our country and the initiator of the reforms of 1985, with the urge:

1. to form a special commission able to investigate the event that caused human deaths in Vilnius and Riga and pass the results to open court.
2. to use the credentials of President of the USSR to prevent the sliding of the country to military dictatorship.
3. to provide cardinal economic reform of the country based on the principles of the programme "500 days".

I wish to believe in wisdom and honor of my President. But belief can't be unlimited. So I ask your activity leading to the economic well-being, safety of human's rights and true democracy. Signature

Those years, he initiated the visit of Cardinal Marco, the spiritual leader of community of St. Edgigio, during which Cardinal met metropolitan Alexy, Soviet students and visited Philanthropic Brotherhood in Vyborg.

Alexey Lushnikov took a part in the Soviet delegation to the Unity Congress of Young Liberals party of West and East Germany in the building of the German Parliament. In the course of the visit a meeting with Hans-Dietrich Genscher took place.

In 1990, a group of Leningrad scientists and technicians have proposed Lushnikov as public deputy of the Leningrad parliament. Having won the first democratic elections in the country, Lushnikov became the youngest deputy in the history of Leningrad (Saint-Petersburg) parliament. In 1990–1993 Lushnikov works as the deputy Editor in chief of the newspaper "Petersburg's Financial Bulletin" and is one of the leaders of the Foundation for assistance to international programs of UNO; he is also the leader of the organization "Youth for Charity", works at the United Nations Department of Public Information of UNO Secretariat in New-York, conducts peace-making activity in "flashpoints" (Georgia, Abkhazia, Azerbaijan).

=== Encyclopedia "Blue Pages of Russia" ===
On June 24, 1993, he creates encyclopedia "Blue Pages of Russia" and becomes its Editor-in-Chief. Later on it was renamed into "National Encyclopedia of Personalities (Blue Pages of Russia)"

=== "Pioneer"'s Epoch ===
Lushnikov is the author, the presenter and the producer of more than 40 TV programs of various genres. In various years, he conducts public radio programs on four radio stations. In 1996 live informational and entertaining talk show 'Pioneer' was started. It was broadcasting twice a week at Eldoradio.

Since 1998, Lushnikov has moved to 'Radio Modern' of Saint-Petersburg where his talk show was broadcasting 4 times a week. Soon after Echo of Moscow in Petersburg was opened, Lushnikov started there his "Analytics".

=== "Blue Pages. Night Talk" ===
September 13, 1999, programme "Blue Pages. Night talk with Alexey Lushnikov" was broadcast by 'TV-6' (Saint-Petersburg) for the first time. The 1st hero of "Blue Pages" was ex-mayor Anatoly Sobchak. The three hundredth guest was ex-President of the USSR Mikhail Gorbachev, the five hundredth one, then governor of Saint-Petersburg Vladimir Yakovlev, has opened monthly cycle of his live talk with televiewers. That time Lushnikov works as general producer of TV channel TV-6 in Petersburg. Over six and half years more than 2000 hours of live broadcasting were produced (over 2000 heroes). The television programme has become one of the leading media in Saint-Petersburg. To light on meaningful events of public life in the city, the country and the world, "Blue Pages" provided TV-marathons and special broadcasts. Those events were the tragedy of nuclear submarine Kursk, explosions in Moscow and Volgodonsk, State Duma elections, Presidential elections, Governor of Saint-Petersburg elections, Petersburg parliament elections, terrorist attacks in USA and others. Since November 13, 2000, programme moves to TNT (Russian TV channel) (Saint-Petersburg).

After May 27, 2002, Lushnikov has joined Petersburg – Channel 5. and has become producer of its night programmes. At the time the channel's title was "TRK Petersburg"

In July 2003 "Blue Pages" have become the object of political censorship and were removed from the broadcasting. December 1, 2003, is a date of the start for Lushnikov's new programme "From Morning Slightly Later" on 36th Nevsky Channel. It was broadcast weekdays from 8:30 to 9:30 am.

On January 5, 2004, Lushnikov starts the work on broadcasting at "TV-3". In April 2005 after 3 months of "truth-first" social programmes, the government of Saint-Petersburg branch of "TV-3 (Russia)" moves the time of broadcasting from 1:30 to 3:00 am. half-year after, on January 27, 2006, Alexey Lushnikov was told that he is denied to broadcast his programmes. Then the management were talking about the decision of the Head of "TV-3 (Russia)". The cause of dismissal wasn't explained. The ban has summoned the wide public resonance, and Sergey Mironov has instructed to revise this event in Public Chamber of Russia.

=== "Your Public Television!" ===
Since October 1, 2007, he is the owner and the Head of the Russian TV-channel "Your Public Television!", and the President of documentary films foundation. As an actor, he worked in 5 films and serials. He played himself in some of them. Lushnikov is the author and the director of a number of documentary and popular films.

=== 2010s. Painting ===
At present he is the President of media-holding "Blue Pages" that unifies several print and electronic media. Hosts talk shows on TV-channel "VOT!".

Alexey Lushnikov is a painter. According to the author, portrait gallery is the 3rd part of the "Blue Pages" conception, that also includes "National Encyclopedia of Personalities" and television channel. Paintings are made in autologous manner with usage of acrylic paints 3D, natural and artificial stones, fragments of mirrors and computer technologies. It was dubbed in France "alexises". At the portraits could be seen different characters, including symbols of the Maya civilization. Heroes of canvases are Vladimir Vysotsky, Yuri Shevchuk, Andrey Krasko, Alla Pugacheva, (ru) Dmitri Nagiev, (ru) Anton Dukhovskoi, Anastasia Volochkova, Sergey Yursky, (ru) Yuri Galtsev, (ru) Andrey Konstantinov, (ru) Artem Tarasov, Valentina Matvienko, Yulia Timoshenko, Dmitri Medvedev, Vladimir Putin etc.

Lushnikov writes books, also he is involved in instruction of young journalists. He is often invited by the leading media as an expert to discuss various public, political and professional questions.

Since 1985 up to now, Lushnikov is dealing much with social activity on protection of animals, on environmental ecology and custody of cultural heritage. He's single, lives in Saint-Petersburg and Biarritz (France).

== Publicism ==
- (ru) Live Journal
- (ru) Blog@"Gorod-812"
- (ru) Blog@"MR7 — News of Petersburg"
- (ru) Blog@"Echo of Moscow"
- (ru) Channel@Youtube

== Bibliography ==
- Lushnikov, Alexey (1993–) National Encyclopedia of Personalities (Blue Pages of Russia) Publishing House "National Encyclopedia of Personalities (Blue Pages of Russia)" Registration of media # P1237 on December 2, 1994. Sanction of DPI (UNO) 18–136 RU on January 15, 1995
- Lushnikov, Alexey (2009) The 3rd face. Special view of Sergey Mironov TV-channel VOT! ISBN 1-55972-250-9
- Lushnikov, Alexey (2011) Antiutopia KultInformPress ISBN 978-5-8392-0296-2
- Lushnikov, Alexey (2011) Déjà-vu of Political Spring KultInformPress

== Filmography ==
=== Director ===
1. 2001 – Vysotsky, film-essay, 4 series
2. 2002 — Gorbachev, documentary
3. 2005 — Embassy Church, documentary, 90 min.
4. 2008 — "Pargolovsky Nights" with Anton Dukhovskoy", documentary
5. 2008 — "Pargolovsky Nights" with Alexander Gorodnitsky", documentary
6. 2008 — "Pargolovsky Nights" with Natasha Pivovarova and band "Colibri", documentary
7. 2008 — "Pargolovsky Nights" with Alexander Dolsky", documentary
8. 2008 — "Pargolovsky Nights" with Semion Strugachev", documentary
9. 2008 — "Pargolovsky Nights" with Yuri Kukin", documentary

=== Actor ===
1. 1998 — "Streets of Broken Lanterns — 1". 4th Series: "Broken telephone" role of Denis
2. 1999 — "Madness" (1st Series)
3. 2000 — "Agent of National Security — 2". 12th Series: "Technology of Murder" role of Gryzlov (Voice of Gennady Smirnov)
4. 2002 – "Russian Scares". 11th Series: "Bro Clone" role of Gleb Koulikov
5. 2003 — "Mongoose". 3rd Series: "Last shot"

== Television and radio ==
=== Radio ===
- Talk show Pioneer. Informational and entertaining programme based on discussions about news and opinions of heroes on actual themes of present. Politicians, scientists, personalities of culture, sportsmen and other celebrities participated. Time-study: 60 min. Broadcasting: Eldoradio, live.

=== Television ===
- Talk show Pioneer. Interactive programme with participation of politicians, scientists, personalities of culture, sportsmen, businessmen and known men of other professions. Time-study: 26 min. It was broadcast from 1996 to 1999. The heroes of programmes in different times were Mikhail Gorbachev, Anatoly Sobchak, Mikhail Boyarsky and many more.
- From Morning Slightly Later. Informational and entertaining programme. Its core were interviews of Saint-Petersburg's and Russia's known men about actual events. Time-study: 52 min. : Broadcasting: "36th Nevsky Channel", live.
- Blue Pages. Night Talk With Alexey Lushnikov. Informational and entertaining programme. The first night broadcast in Saint Petersburg.
- Your Public Television! (Telekanal VOT!). The only special political TV-channel in Russia.

== Awards and accomplishments ==
- 1996 — III Festival of Regional telecompanies "All Russia": prize in the nomination "Talk Show" ("Pioneer").
- 2000 — contest "Men Of Our City": 5th place in the nomination "Producer Of The Year" (38279 votes).
- 2000 — professional award of Saint-Petersburg's musical media "Master-key": the best media-project of the season 1999–2000 in Saint-Petersburg (night broadcasting on TV-6 Moscow).
- 2002 — X International Festival of Arts "Master-class" (Saint-Petersburg): grand-prix and the title "Master of Arts" in the nomination "Televisional Art".
- 2003 — Medal "In Commemoration of the 300th Anniversary of Saint Petersburg"
- 2003 — "Tsarskoe Selo's Art Award" (it was given to TV-journalist for the 1st time in the history)
- 2008 — honorary brevet of the Base Organisation of the Commonwealth of Independent States' participating countries. "For the exceptional role and high accomplishments in organisation of the public television and defense of the liberty of speech".
- 2008 — gratitude of Federal Drug Control Service of Russia for substantial input into antidrug resistance and propaganda of healthy life-style.
- 2008 — independent business-premium "Chief of the year – 2008" in the nomination "Chief-publicity".
- 2008 — honorary charter of the Union of Journalists of Russia for large input into the development of Russian journalism.
- 2008 — honorary diplome of Saint-Petersburg's Parliament for exceptional input in development of personified base of Russian Federation.
- 2009 — Municipal formation "District Petrovsky": honorary citizen.

== Interesting facts ==
(ru) Alexey Lushnikov's interview to the site of supporters of Sergey Mironov:

In 1999 there were mayor's elections. (ru) V. Yakovlev ran. The interview of (ru) Yuri Boldyrev was broadcast then. That time thunder happened. Yuri Yurievich (Boldyrev) has said very tough about (ru) Vladimir Yakovlev – and all of a sudden lightning has struck electricity! The next day some media published titles like: "Boldyrev wasn't let to say!". People asked me: "Why have you interrupted Boldyrev? I have had no choice but to explain away that it was just a thunder, but nobody believed.

- The 1st presentation of "National Encyclopedia of Personalities (Blue Pages of Russia)" has passed at General Assemble of UNO in New-York. Later Encyclopedia was distributed over 179 countries, members of UNO. Its circulation was 450 000 copies.
- Fragments of "Blue Pages"' broadcast with Mikhail Gorbachev were used in the (ru) Alexey Vishnya's musical project "Political techno"
- Alexey Lushnikov is an active participant of public actions for salvation of architectural legacy of Saint-Petersburg.
- Society "Youth for Charity" in team with company "Sovmarket" has founded organizing committee of the 1st All-USSR contest of erotic photo in June 1989. The accumulated funds were brought to development of the program "Temple of Charity".
- Alexey Lushnikov was a member of Central committee of (ru) Party of Beer Fans over North-West region of Russia.
- In December 2008 he organized the action for salvation of books.
- On July 26, 2010, Alexey Lushnikov took a part in program "(ru) Let's Get Married!"
