= The Old New Year =

- Directed by: Naum Ardashnikov; Oleg Yefremov
- Written by: Mikhail Roshchin
- Starring: Vyacheslav Nevinny; Alexander Kalyagin; Irina Miroshnichenko; Kseniya Minina
- Cinematography: Naum Ardashnikov; Grigotiy Shpakler; L. Andrianov
- Music by: Sergey Nikitin
- Production company: Mosfilm
- Release date: 1981
- Running time: 132 minutes (2 parts)
- Country: Soviet Union
- Language: Russian

The Old New Year (Russian: Cтаpый Нoвый гoд, romanized: Stariy Noviy god) is a 1981 Soviet comedy film directed by Naum Ardashnikov and Oleg Yefremov. After the successful staging at the Moscow Art Theatre (directed by Oleg Yefremov), based on Mikhail Roshchin's play of the same name, it was filmed at Mosfilm with almost the same set of actors. It is considered to be one of the most significant works by Naum Ardashnikov.

== Plot ==
The Old New Year's Eve. Two families – Sebeykins, representatives of the working class and Poluorlovs, representatives of the intelligentsia – celebrate the holiday, Sebeykins also have a housewarming. Pyotr Poluorlov comes home in the evening, everything is ready for the holiday, but he is in a bad mood. He is disappointed with his life and with everything that he has achieved. Wealth and the equipped apartment – this is not something what he has been living for. His wife and family do not understand why he suddenly decided to throw away furniture, TV-set and the piano from the apartment. Pyotr Sebeykin also does not find a common language with his family. He worked all his life to achieve welfare and prosperity for his family, but all of a sudden it turns to mean nothing for him.

Finally Poluorlov and Sebeykin quarrel with their families and slamming their doors, both leave their homes. The two men take their friends with them and go to banya, and after taking a bath and drinking a mug of beer, they try to understand how to live further.

== Cast ==
- Vyacheslav Nevinny — Pyotr Sebeykin, toy factory worker
- Alexander Kalyagin — Pyotr Poluorlov, engineer-inventor
- Yevgeny Yevstigneyev — Ivan Adamytch, neighbor
- Kseniya Minina — Klava, Sebeykin's wife
- Irina Miroshnichenko — Klava, Poluorlov's wife'
- Pyotr Shcherbakov — Gosha, Poluorlov's friend
- Anastasiya Nemolyaeva — Lisa, Sebeykin's daughter
- Valentin Karmanov — Fedya, Poluorlov's son
- Viktor Petrov — Vasya, Sebeykin's friend
- Georgi Burkov — Sebeykin's father-in-law
- Valeriya Dementyeva — Sebeykin's mother-in-law
- Tatyana Zabrodina — Lyuba, Sebeykin's sister
- Vladimir Troshin — Lyuba's husband
- Liliya Yevstigneyeva — Inna, Poluorlov's sister
- Marina Dobrovolskaya — Dasha, TV-worker
- Vyacheslav Stepanov — Valerik, Poluorlov's school friend
- Boris Shcherbakov — student, Sebeykin's relative
- Yevgeniya Khanayeva — Anna Romanovna, Klava Poluorlova's aunt
- Natalya Nazarova — Nyura, Sebeykin's relative
- Tatyana Nikitina — singer
- Sergey Nikitin — singer with guitar

== Soundtrack ==
Sergey Nikitin's song "Snow is Falling" (rus. «Снег идёт», lyrics by Boris Pasternak) appeared in this movie for the first time. This Pasternak's poem mentions Old New Year. This song was released by Melodiya studio on vinyl discs, compact cassettes and reel-to-reel tapes. Boney M.'s song "Let It All Be" also appears in the film.
