= Trips on an Old Car =

- Russian: Поездки на старом автомобиле
- Directed by: Pyotr Fomenko
- Written by: Emil Braginskiy
- Starring: Lyudmila Maksakova; Andrei Boltnev; Tatyana Nikitina; Sergey Nikitin; Yelena Karadzhova
- Cinematography: Vsevolod Simakov
- Music by: Sergey Nikitin
- Release date: 1985
- Country: Soviet Union
- Language: Russian

Trips on an Old Car (Russian: Поездки на старом автомобиле) is a 1985 Soviet romantic comedy film directed by Pyotr Fomenko.

== Plot ==
The film tells about a grandmother who is deprived of the opportunity to meet her only grandson, gets acquainted with the new father-in-law of a former daughter-in-law and falls in love with him.

== Cast ==
- Lyudmila Maksakova as Zoya Pavlovna
- Andrei Boltnev as German Sergeyevich
- Tatyana Nikitina as Natalya Stepanovna
- Sergey Nikitin as Lomov
- Yelena Karadzhova as Dasha
- Lyudmila Arinina as Club director
- Larisa Udovichenko as Lilya
- Lev Perfilov as Mikhalyov
- Grigori Gurvich
- Elena Drobysheva
