= Viktor Berkovsky =

Soviet-Ukrainian bard (1932–2005)

- Viktor Berkovsky on the cover of his CD, "The Cherry Clarinet"

Background information
- Born: July 13, 1932; Zaporizhzhia
- Died: July 24, 2005 (aged 73) Moscow
- Genres: Bard

Viktor Semyonovich Berkovsky (Russian: Виктор Семёнович Берковский; July 13, 1932 in Zaporizhzhia – July 24, 2005 in Moscow) was a Soviet and Ukrainian Jewish bard.

== Early years and education ==
Berkovsky was born on July 13, 1932 in Zaporizhzhia, Ukrainian SSR to a Jewish family. During the Great Patriotic War (WWII), he was evacuated with his family to Novokuznetsk, where his mother, Etel Viktorovna Gerts, was a prominent cardiologist and head of the cardiology department in a hospital for wounded soldiers. His father, Samuil Mikhaylovich Berkovsky, was drafted and mobilized on the first day of the war, serving in the infantry. After graduating from high school in 1950, Berkovsky left for Moscow, where he received a degree from Moscow Institute of Steel and Alloys. In 1955, Berkovsky came back to Zaporizhzhia to work in the "Dneprostal" factory. In order to better learn his profession, Berkovsky voluntarily chose to work as a factory worker, and by 1962 he became head of the factory's technological department.

In 1962, Berkovsky returned to Moscow for PhD studies at the Moscow Institute of Steel and Alloys. He received a PhD degree in 1967, and stayed on at the institute first as an instructor, and later as associate professor.

== Music career ==
Practically all his life Berkovsky composed music. He wrote the music for about 200 songs. Many of these became very popular in the Soviet Union: "Grenada" (text by Mikhail Svetlov), "Песня шагом, шагом" (text by Novella Matveeva), "Ну что с того, что я там был" (text by Yuri Levitansky), "Сороковые роковые" (text by David Samoylov), "Лошади в океане" (text by Boris Slutsky), "Вспомните, ребята!", "Песенка про собачку Тябу", "Альма-матер" (text by Dmitry Sukharev), "Контрабандисты" (text by Eduard Bagritsky), "На далекой Амазонке" (text by Rudyard Kipling, translated by Samuil Marshak), "Черешневый кларнет" (text by Bulat Okudzhava), "Под музыку Вивальди" (music composed in collaboration with Sergei Nikitin, text by Alexander Velichansky), "Снегопад" (text by Yunna Morits), and many others.

Viktor Berkovsky worked closely with Sergey Nikitin on composing music for the theater and movies, such as "Мэри Поппинс", "Коньки", "Морские ворота" (text by Yuri Vizbor), "Большая докторская сказка", "Али-Баба и 40 песен персидского базара", and songs for the children's show "Будильник" (texts by Daniil Kharms).

== Personal life ==
Berkovsky died on July 23, 2005 in Moscow.
