= Valentin Vikhorev =

Soviet singer-songwriter

Valentin Ivanovich Vikhorev Валентин Иванович Вихорев
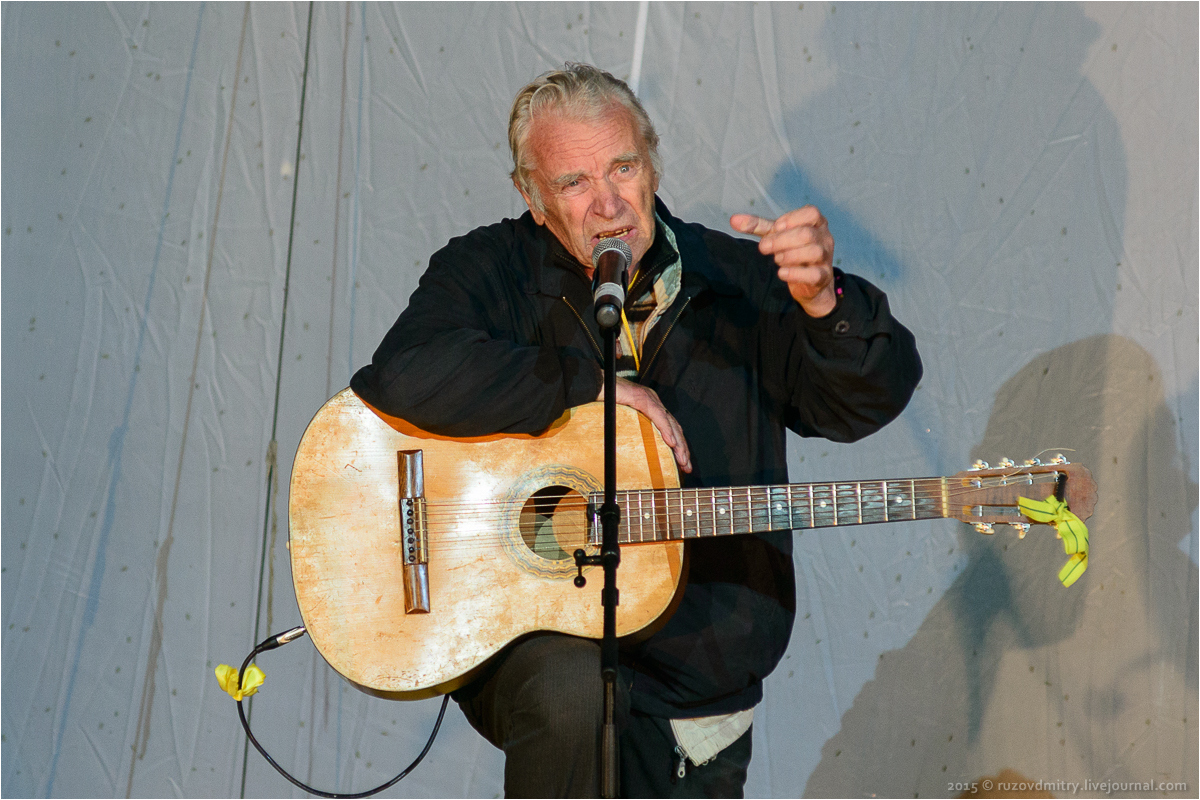

Background information
- Born: 22 November 1931 (age 94); Leningrad, Russian SFSR, Soviet Union (present-day Saint Petersburg, Russia)
- Genre: Acoustic music
- Occupation: Singer-songwriter
- Website: vihorev.ru

Valentin Ivanovich Vikhorev (Note: Russian: Валентин Иванович Вихорев, romanized: Valentin Ivanovich Vikhorev) (born 22 November 1931) is a Soviet and Russian singer-songwriter whose instrument is the seven-string guitar. Valentin was born in Leningrad and is regarded as a member of the movement called Soviet "Bard" culture.

== Compositions ==
=== Songs ===
- Beyond Luga, beyond Luga...
- There is a backpack from farm to farm ...
- How windy and wet it is today...
- Summer goes south...
- Wet maple outside the window ...
- We will go with you to the forest for berries ...
- On the Solovetsky Islands...
- The tram left for the front ...
- We've lost our nerve...
- Jumping, jumping mailers ...
- Summer is leaning like a ripe ear ...
- There are tents in the March snow...
- August, my friend, has a cool summer day...
- The tired wedge slid down to the water...
- I would say good things to you...

== Recordings ==
- 1988: Vikhorev V.I. “I would tell you a lot of good things..." (Melodiya)
