= Vizbor =

Vizbor may refer to:

- 3260 Vizbor, an asteroid.
- Yuri Vizbor, a Soviet Bard.
