= Leonid Dukhovny =

Soviet-American singer-songwriter (1938–2022)

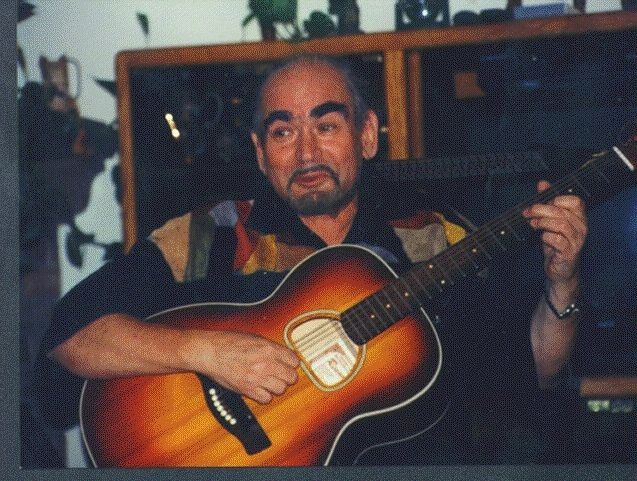
- Dukhovny performing in 1993
- Born: July 18, 1938; Kyiv, Ukrainian SSR, USSR
- Died: May 4, 2022 (aged 83); Mountain View, California, U.S.
- Occupations: Bard; singer-songwriter; poet; producer
- Years active: 1952–2022
- Children: Jim Dukhovny
- Musical career
- Genres: Bard (Soviet Union); jazz
- Instruments: Vocals; guitar; double bass
- Website: www.bards.ru/..

Leonid (Joseph) Dukhovny (July 18, 1938 – May 4, 2022) was a Soviet and American songwriter, poet, musician, bard, and producer.

Dukhovny wrote songs in Russian and Ukrainian languages, using his own lyrics, as well as lyrics by other poets. He wrote over 200 songs. The most famous are "Podol" ("А без Подола Киев невозможен"), "Waltz for Two" ("Вальс двоих"), "Spring in the Forest" ("Осень в лесу"), "Let's Talk" ("Давай поговорим"). He won the prestigious Grushinsky festival in 1976. Dukhovny was famous for his songs about neighborhoods of Kyiv, such as "Podol", "Evbaz", and "Shulyavka". He was also known for his satirical Ukrainian songs.

Dukhovny was one of seven heads of the Soviet Bard movement, responsible for Ukraine and Moldova.

He was a founder and the head of the bard club Koster ("Bonfire"), one of the first and the biggest bard clubs in Kyiv.

After moving to the San Francisco Bay Area in 1992, he founded and became the president of one of the first and the largest bard clubs, Poluostrov ("Peninsula"), in the US.

Since 1992, Dukhovny was a community leader for Soviet and Ukrainian communities of San Francisco and Silicon Valley.

== Biography ==
Dukhovny was born July 18, 1938, in Kyiv, Ukrainian Soviet Socialist Republic, USSR. He studied and defended his dissertation in Moscow at Moscow State University of Civil Engineering (MISI) and Moscow State University of Civil Engineering (VZISI). He graduated from special courses in Bard Directing at the Ministry of Culture.

The first song (paraphrase) was written in 1952–1953. Dukhovny was the founder of one of the first Kyiv bard-clubs (KSP), Koster ("Bonfire"), becoming its president from 1973 to 1992. He was one of the seven coordinators of the "Union of the KSP" (1979–86) - the first informal association of the KSP bard clubs of the USSR. He was responsible for the Ukraine-Moldova region. He was a well-known culturologist of the world movement of the Bard.

In the former USSR, Dukhovny was repeatedly subjected to repressions by the KGB for his works and activities.

Dukhovny was a laureate of many Bard festivals (in particular, the prestigious bard-festival Grushinsky festival in 1976). He frequently judged regional, country, international festivals (Moscow, Chimgan, Minsk, Riga, Leningrad, Kyiv, Ottawa, San Francisco and others).

On September 11, 1992, he immigrated from Kyiv, Ukraine to the San Francisco Bay Area, USA. On October 19, 1992, Dukhovny founded the Poluostrov ("Peninsula") bard club in the San Francisco Bay Area, and led it until his death. It was one of the first and largest bard-clubs in the US.

Within the framework of the 2nd Open All-American Festival "Peninsula-96", together with B. Golstein, he held the founding meeting of the "ARCA" association (Association of Russian-speaking Clubs and Authors of Poetic Song USA), where he was elected its president.

Dukhovny was an author of a number of articles and theoretical developments on the problems and history of the Bard movement. He lectured at universities (in particular, in Kemerovo, USSR and Stanford, California, US). Songs, articles and poems were published in collections, booklets, magazine collections, periodicals. In 1998, a CD with 20 songs was released, and in 1999 an audio cassette. Many songs are copyrighted. There were cases when authorship was restored in court.

He organized, promoted and produced concerts by bards from 1980s in USSR to 2022 in the US.

Dukhovny was killed in a fire at the apartment complex in Mountain View, California, US on May 4, 2022.
