= Alla Pokrovskaya =

Soviet-Russian actress and educator (1937–2019)

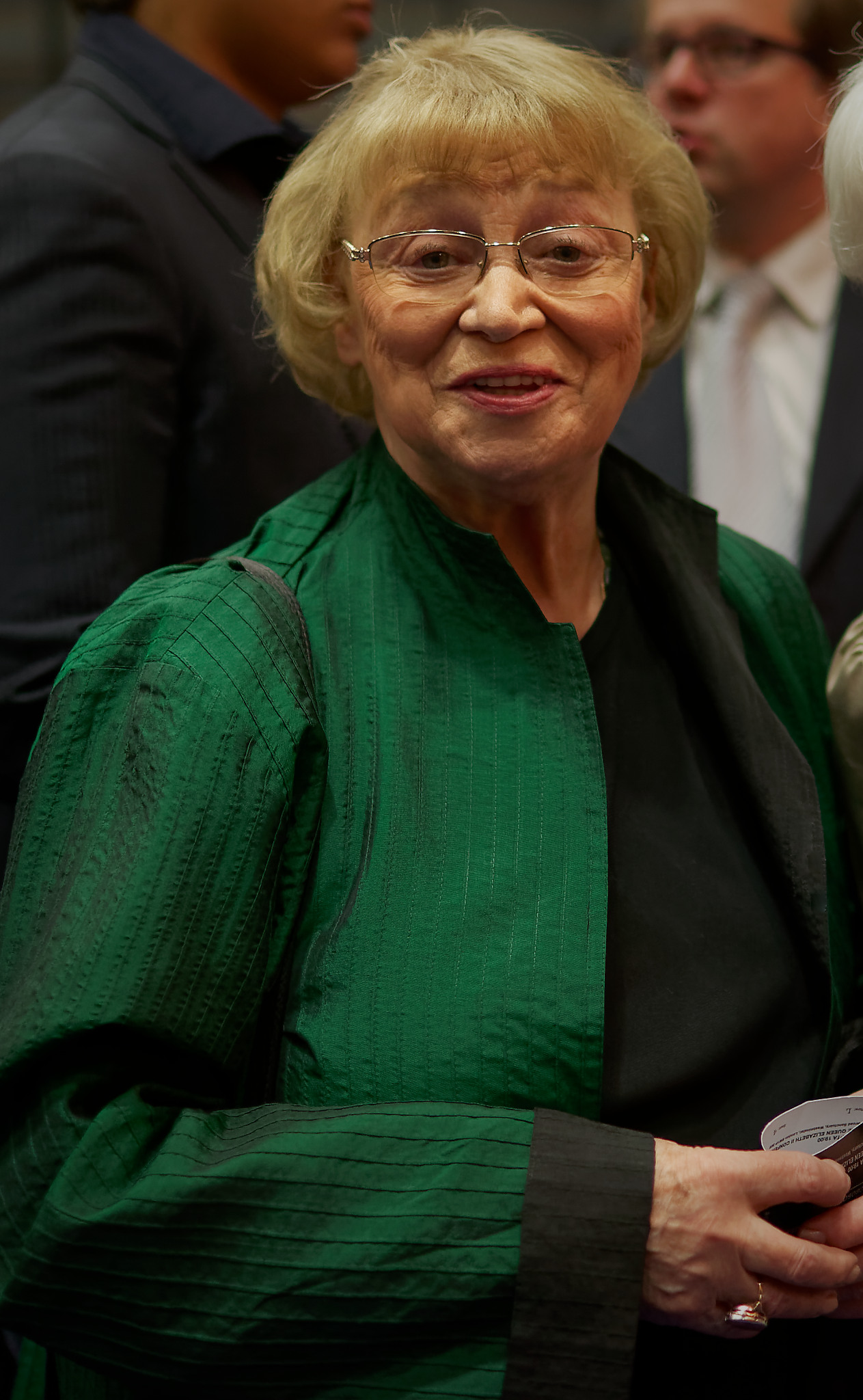
- Born: 18 September 1937; Moscow, Soviet Union
- Died: 25 June 2019 (aged 81); Moscow, Russia
- Resting place: Troyekurovskoye Cemetery
- Occupation: actress
- Children: Mikhail Yefremov

Alla Borisovna Pokrovskaya (Russian: А́лла Бори́совна Покро́вская; 18 September 1937 – 25 June 2019) was a Soviet and Russian actress and educator.

== Life ==
Pokrovskaya was born in Moscow. Her father was the opera director Boris Pokrovsky and her mother, Anna Nekrasova, was the director of the Central Children's Theatre. Her parents did not encourage or rate her acting talents. She initially decided to be a teacher but then went into acting. She studied at the Moscow Art Theater School and, in her spare time, she volunteered as a stage hand for Oleg Yefremov's theatre. Whilst there she saw Igor Kvasha, Galina Volchek and Yevgeny Yevstigneyev perform at the Sovremennik Theatre. She graduated in 1959.

Pokrovskaya was a professor at the Moscow Art Theatre School. She was married to Oleg Yefremov. Pokrovskaya was known for her roles in Take Aim, Fox Hunting and July Rain.

One of her last films was Vysotsky. Thank You For Being Alive, where she appeared as Vladimir Vysotsky's mother.

Pokrovskaya died on 25 June 2019 at a Moscow hospital due to sepsis caused by liver disease, aged 81.

== Filmography ==
Year	Title	Role	Notes
1967	July Rain	Lelya Kurikhina	
1969	Mine	Tatyana	
1975	Diary of a School Director	Lida	
1975	Take Aim	Tanya	
1976	Family Melodrama	teacher	
1978	Namesake	Alja	
1980	Fox Hunting	Olga Sergeyevna	
1984	Third in the Fifth Row	Vera Matveevna	
1984	The Tale of Tsar Saltan	weaver	voice
1988	Self-Portrait of an Unknown	Ryabov's mother	
2011	Vysotsky. Thank You For Being Alive	mother of Vladimir Vysotsky	final film role
