= Diary of a School Director =

- Russian: Дневник директора школы
- Directed by: Boris Frumin
- Written by: Anatoli Grebnev
- Starring: Oleg Borisov; Iya Savvina; Alla Pokrovskaya; Aleksandr Snykov; Lyudmila Gurchenko
- Cinematography: Aleksei Gambaryan
- Edited by: T. Denisova
- Music by: Viktor Lebedev
- Production company: Lenfilm
- Release date: 1975
- Running time: 73 min.
- Country: Soviet Union
- Language: Russian

Diary of a School Director (Russian: Дневник директора школы, romanized: Dnevnik direktora shkoly) is a 1975 Soviet drama film directed by Boris Frumin.

The film tells about the school director, who oversees the daily life of the school, tries to understand the problems of education and conflicts with the head teacher of the school, who is also devoted to her work.

== Plot ==
The story centers on the daily life of Sveshnikov, the director of Leningrad Secondary School No. 183, a former soldier and writer who found new purpose as an educator. Sveshnikov takes a dedicated, demanding approach to his role, deeply aware of the teacher’s impact on students’ lives. He strives to address contemporary issues in education, believing that traditional, one-sided teaching methods must give way to a dialogue between teacher and student, where young people’s right to their own opinions is respected.

Sveshnikov’s commitment to tolerance and respect for each student's individuality and talents brings him into conflict with the school’s assistant principal, Valentina Fyodorovna, who criticizes his liberal and permissive methods. At home, Sveshnikov’s educational ideals are tested by his own son, whose defiant independence and youthful idealism challenge the very principles Sveshnikov champions in his professional life.

== Cast ==
- Oleg Borisov as Boris Sveshnikov
- Iya Savvina as Valentina Fyodorovna
- Alla Pokrovskaya as Lida
- Aleksandr Snykov as Sergey
- Lyudmila Gurchenko as Nina Sergeyevna
- Elena Solovey as Tatyana Georgiyevna
- Sergey Koshonin as Igor Koltsov
- Nikolay Lavrov as Oleg Pavlovich
- Georgiy Teykh as Genrikh Grigoryevich
- Yuri Vizbor as Pavlik Smirnov
- Boris Leskin as Olya's father
- Viktor Pavlov as Pavel Matveevich Ibragimov
