= Yuri Kukin =

Yuri Alexeevich Kukin Юрий Алексеевич Кукин
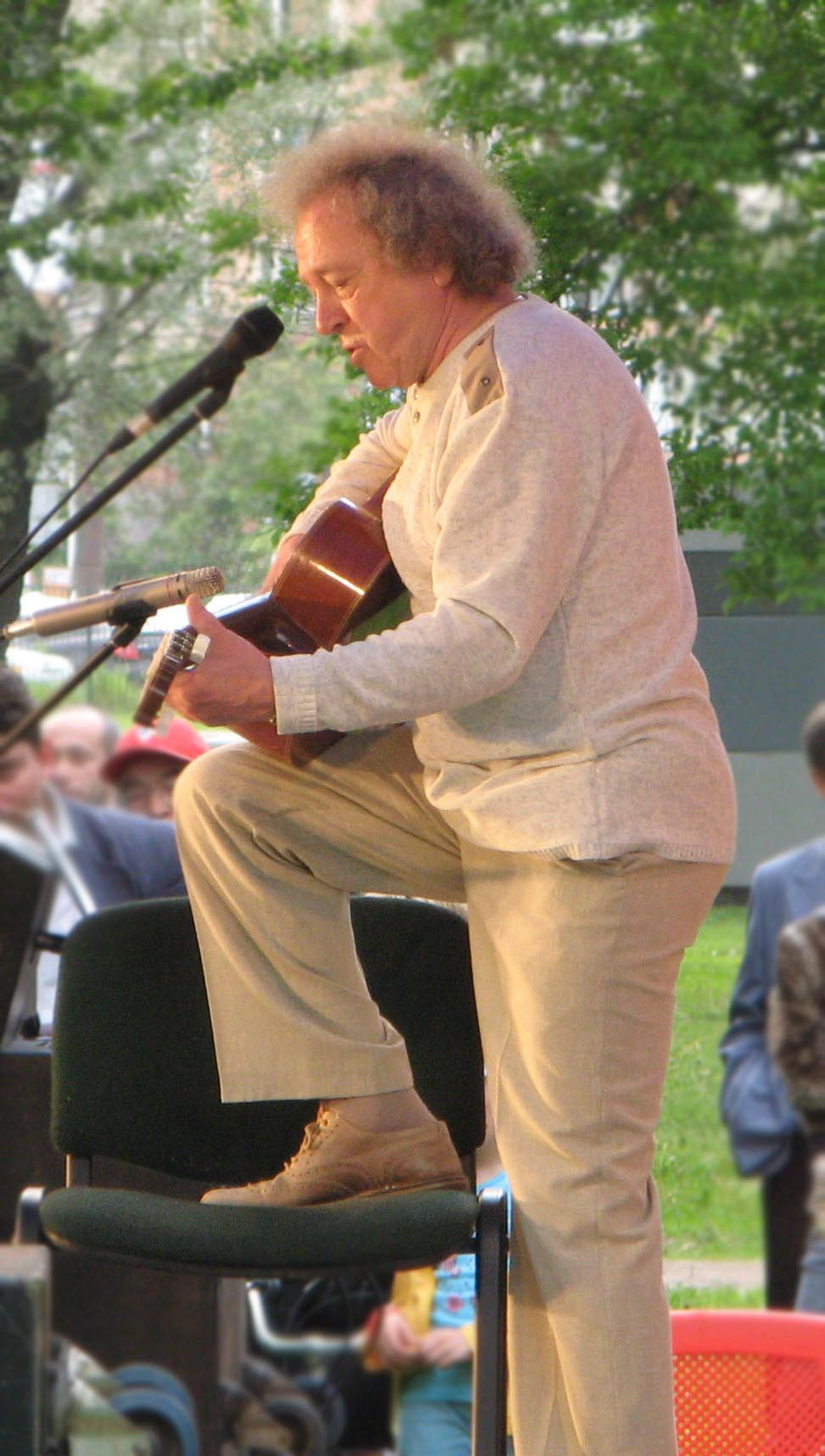
- Yuri Kukin in June 2008

Background information
- Born: Yuri Alexeevich Kukin; 17 July 1932; Syasstroy, Russian SFSR, Soviet Union (present-day Russia)
- Died: 7 July 2011 (aged 78) Saint Petersburg, Russia
- Occupation: Singer
- Instrument: Guitar

Yuri Alexeevich Kukin (Note: Russian: Юрий Алексеевич Кукин, romanized: Yury Alekseyevich Kukin) (17 July 1932 – 7 July 2011) was a Russian bard.

== Life ==
Yuri Kukin was born in 1932 in the town of Syasstroy in the Leningrad region. After graduating from the Lesgaft Institute of Physical Training in Leningrad in 1954, Kukin worked as a figure skating coach in sports schools. In 1960s, he participated in geological expeditions to Kamchatka, Chita, Ural and Pamir.

Since childhood, Kukin was involved with music, playing in a jazz band as a drummer. In 1948, he started to write songs and perform them. Later, some of these songs became popular among hikers and geologists, and then among the general public. Over time, Kukin won prizes at various festivals.

In 1968, Kukin began performing as an artist at Lenconcert while also working at the «Meridian», a Leningrad health club, as a PE instructor. In 1971, he began working at the Leningrad Symphony. In 1979 he worked at Lenconcert, and in 1988, he worked at a theater studio called «Benefis».
