= July Rain =

- Original Slovak film poster
- Directed by: Marlen Khutsiev
- Written by: Anatoly Grebnev; Marlen Khutsiev
- Produced by: Aleksandr Yablochkin
- Starring: Yevgenia Uralova; Aleksandr Belyavsky; Yuri Vizbor
- Cinematography: German Lavrov
- Edited by: A. Abramova
- Music by: Bulat Okudzhava; Yuriy Vizbor
- Production company: Mosfilm
- Release date: 7 August 1967
- Running time: 107 min
- Country: Soviet Union
- Language: Russian

July Rain (Russian: Июльский дождь, romanized: Iyulskiy dozhd) is a 1967 Soviet drama film directed by Marlen Khutsiev.

July Rain is story about the rather boring life of 28-year old Lena, her mother, her longterm boyfriend Volodya and their intellectual friends - and Zhenya, the stranger she has occasional telephone conversations with since he once lent her his jacket during a heavy rain.

== Plot ==
Lena, a translator at a printing house, is engaged to Volodya, a promising scientist. Over several months, their lives unfold from a summer rainstorm to late autumn, marked by social gatherings and personal challenges. During a downpour, a passerby named Zhenya lends Lena his raincoat, leading to a series of missed opportunities for them to meet again. Meanwhile, Volodya struggles with self-doubt after his research is stolen by a professor, and Lena faces pressure from her mother to marry. The couple navigates shared experiences, such as a modern-style party and a countryside picnic, where discussions of betrayal and ambition deepen their reflections.

As autumn progresses, Lena's father dies, casting a shadow over her life. Despite a vacation by the sea, where Volodya proposes, Lena grows disillusioned and rejects the engagement, signaling a shift in her priorities. Their relationship ends as Lena reevaluates her future. The film closes on a bittersweet note with a reunion of war veterans outside the Bolshoi Theatre, offering a brief glimpse of joy amid the changes in their lives.

== Cast ==
- Yevgenia Uralova as Lena
- Aleksandr Belyavsky as Volodya
- Yuri Vizbor as Alik
- Yevgenia Kozyreva as Lena's Mother
- Alexander Mitta as Vladik
- Alla Pokrovskaya as Lelya Kurikhina
- Valentina Sharykina as Lyusya
- Ilya Bylinkin as Zhenya (as I. Bylinkin)
- Yuri Ilchuk as Leva

== Style ==
Just like Khutsiev's previous film, I am Twenty, July Rain is heavily inspired by the French New Wave, with its combination of realism, subjectivity, discontinuous editing and long takes. It has also often been described as the Soviet version of an Antonioni film.

The story about Lena and her friends is interspersed with long documentary scenes from Moscow. The film can be seen as a declaration of love to Moscow and its younger generation, and was possibly Khutsiev's angry response to the heavy criticism he encountered from Nikita Khrushchev for I am Twenty and its portrayal of Soviet youth worrying about money and jobs and listening to Western music.

Although I am Twenty won a prize at the Venice Film Festival, the Soviet authorities refused to send July Rain to Venice when it was invited to participate.
