= Andrei Lushnikov =

Russian footballer

Personal information
- Full name: Andrei Olegovich Lushnikov
- Date of birth: 1 January 1975 (age 51)
- Place of birth: Prague, Czechoslovakia
- Height: 1.78 m (5 ft 10 in)
- Position: Midfielder

Youth career
- FShM Moscow

Senior career*
Years	Team	Apps	(Gls)
1991–1992	FC Spartak Moscow	0	(0)
1992	→ FC Spartak-d Moscow (loan)	3	(0)
1992–1993	FC Asmaral Moscow	2	(0)
1992–1993	→ FC Asmaral-d Moscow (loans)	46	(4)
1994–1996	FC Dynamo Moscow	0	(0)
1994–1996	→ FC Dynamo-d Moscow (loans)	49	(6)
1997	FC Anzhi Makhachkala	32	(7)
1998	FC Samotlor-XXI Nizhnevartovsk	32	(5)
- * Club domestic league appearances and goals

Andrei Olegovich Lushnikov (Russian: Андрей Олегович Лушников; born 1 January 1975) is a former Russian football player.
