= Alexander Gorodnitsky =

Russian bard and poet (born 1933)

Alexander Moiseevich Gorodnitsky
- Александр Моисеевич Городницкий
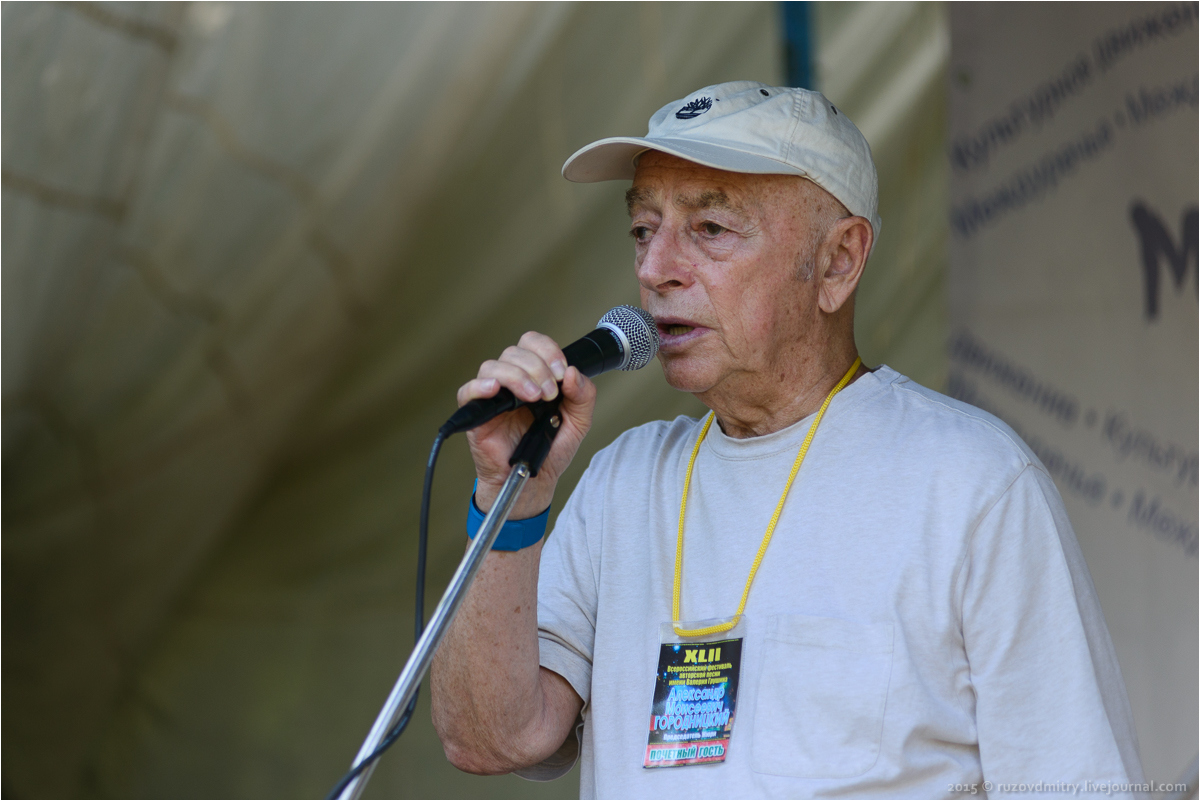
- Gorodnitsky at 2015 Grushinsky Festival
- Born: 20 March 1933 (age 93); Leningrad
- Occupations: geologist, oceanographer, and poet, bard

Alexander Moiseevich Gorodnitsky (Note: Russian: Александр Моисеевич Городницкий, romanized: Aleksandr Moiseyevich Gorodnitsky, IPA: [ɐlʲɪˈksandr məɪˈsʲejɪvʲɪtɕ ɡərɐˈdʲnʲitskʲɪj]) (born March 20, 1933) is a Soviet and Russian bard and poet.

He is the author of over 60 books, poems, songs, and other literary works. His song "The Atlanteans Hold the Heavens" is the official anthem of the Hermitage Museum and considered as unofficial anthem of Saint Petersburg.

Professionally, he is a geologist and oceanographer. Gorodnitsky is an author of over 250 scientific publications on geophysics and tectonics of ocean bottom.

Asteroid No. 5988 and a pass in the Sayan Mountains were named after Alexander Gorodnitsky.

== Early life ==
Gorodnitsky was born on 20 March 1933 in Leningrad to a Russian Jewish family originated from Mogilev. His father, Moisey Afroimovich Gorodnitsky (1908–1986), was an engineer who worked in the printing industry. His mother, Rakhil Moiseevna Gorodnitskaya (1908–1981), in her youth, was a school mathematics teacher, then worked as corrector and editor of sailing directions.

Gorodnitsky survived the Siege of Leningrad during the Second World War. In 1951, he graduated from high school №254 and entered the Faculty of Geophysics of the Leningrad Mining Institute, from which he graduated in 1957 with specialist degree.

== Academic career ==
From 1957 until 1972, Gorodnitsky worked in the All Russian Research Institute of Geology and Mineral Resources of the World Ocean, a research institute for arctic geology. He has participated in many geological expeditions. Gorodnitsky is one of the discoverers of the Igarskoye copper deposit (1962).

Since 1962, he has participated in maritime geophysical expeditions. Gorodnitsky is one of the authors of new ocean's electric field measurement method (1967). In collaboration with V.D. Fedorov and A.N. Paramonov, he discovered the bioelectric effect of phytoplankton (1967). In 1968, he became a Candidate of Sciences (thesis on "The application of magnetometry and electrometry for the ocean bottom exploration").

In 1972, Gorodnitsky moved from Leningrad to Moscow and started working for the Shirshov Institute of Oceanology as a principal researcher. In 1982, he became a Doctor of Sciences in geological and mineralogical sciences (thesis on "The structure of oceanic lithosphere and underwater mountain building"). In 1991, Gorodnitsky became an academic professor. In 1997, he authored an original model of petromagnetic structure of the mid-ocean ridge zones.

Gorodnitsky was at the drifting stations of the North Pole in 1964 and Antarctica in 1973. In 1982 and 1984, he took part in expeditions devoted to the search for the legendary Atlantis at the Ampère Seamount in the North Atlantic.

Gorodnitsky's research included numerous dives on bathyscaphes, starting from Hermit Atoll in Papua New Guinea in 1978. In 1988, during an expedition on the research ship Akademik Mstislav Keldysh in the North Atlantic on the deep-sea apparatus Mir (submersible), he dove to a depth of 4.5 kilometers.

Gorodnitsky teaches in the State University of the naukograd Dubna as a visiting professor. He was awarded the honorary title of "Merited Figure of Sciences of the Russian Federation" in 2005.

== Poet and singer-songwriter ==
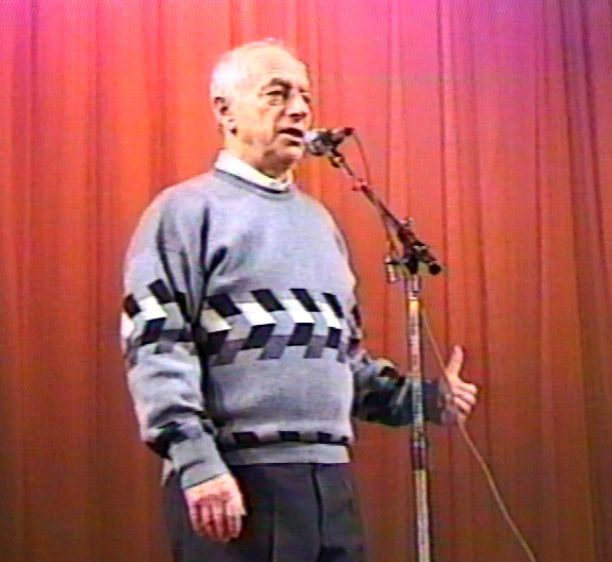
Alexander Gorodnitsky

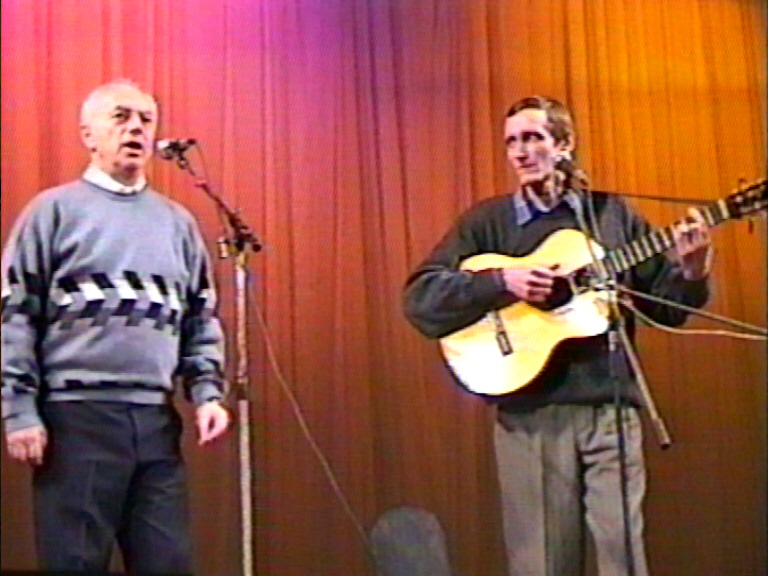
Alexander Gorodnitsky and Alexander Kostromin

Gorodnitsky's first songs were performed during his expedition in 1953. His songs were initially distributed via samizdat tape recordings and often performed by other singers. Like Alexander Galich, and unlike most other bards, Gorodnitsky composed and sang his songs a cappella for several decades; later, he started playing the guitar. Most of his songs are based on his personal experiences. In concert, he usually performs with a professional guitarist accompanying him.

In 1972, Alexander Gorodnitsky was admitted to the Union of Soviet Writers on the recommendations of famous poets Boris Slutsky, David Samoilov, and Vadim Shefner.

In the opinion of literary critics: "The art of Alexander Gorodnitsky is definitely a most remarkable phenomenon of both guitar poetry and the wider Russian literary culture of the 20th century. Having undergone a nearly 50-year-long evolution, it now presents an organic synthesis of the poetic word with profound philosophical, historical, and scientific intuition to embody in its multi-genre creative system the essential qualities of the modern worldview".

Poems and songs by Alexander Gorodnitsky have been translated into English, Bulgarian, Hebrew, Spanish, German, Polish, French, Czech and other languages. They have also been included in school curricula.

Gorodnitsky is acknowledged to be one of the founders of the bard songs genre in the Soviet Union. His most popular songs are: "The Atlanteans Hold the Heavens", "Near the Pillars of Hercules", "To the Mainland", "Blue Sky Above Canada", "French Ambassador's Wife", "Snow", "Riffles", and "The Song of Polar Pilots".

Many of Alexander Gorodnitsky's poems and songs published in the post-Soviet period are dedicated to Germany, including "Stuttgart" (1998), "Neva-Elbe" (2000), "German Castles" (2003), "Johann Sebastian Bach" (2018), "Lüneburg" (2019), and others.

Gorodnitsky is a member of the Union of Writers of Russia and PEN International. He is also a member of the Board of Trustees of the Fazil Iskander International Literary Award. He was awarded the honorary title of "Merited Figure of Arts of the Russian Federation" in 2013.

== Family ==
With his first wife, Gorodnitsky had a son, Vladimir (born 1955), who has lived in Israel since 1984.

His second wife was Anna Nal (28 September 1942 – 11 September 2017), a professional interpreter/translator. The marriage was childless.

== Political views and social activity ==
Gorodnitsky opposed the annexation of Crimea by the Russian Federation and signed an open letter against the Russo-Ukrainian War, political isolation of Russia, and the restoration of totalitarianism.

== Albums ==
- «Русские барды. Александр Городницкий» («Имка-Пресс», Париж, 1977).
- «Атланты» («Мелодия», Ленинград, 1987), («Мелодия», Москва, 1987).
- «Берег» (1988).
- «Около площади» (1993).
- «За тех, кто на Земле» (1995).
- «Давай поедем в Царское Село» (1997).
- «Вперёдсмотрящий» (1996).
- «Система Декарта» (1999).
- «На материк» (1998).
- «Как медь умела петь…» (1997).
- «За шпилей твоих окоём» (2003).
- «Александр Городницкий» (двойной альбом, 2002).
- «Двадцать первый тревожный век» (2003).
- «Уйти на судне» (2005).
- «Гадание по ладони» (2003).
- «Река времён» (2008).
- «Навстречу судьбе» (2009).
- «От Оренбурга до Петербурга» (2009).
- «Новая Голландия» (2009).
- «Глобальное потепление» (2012).
- «Почему расстались» (2013).
- «У Геркулесовых столбов» (2013).
- «Детям» (2014).
- «Споём, ребята, вместе» (2014).
- «Давайте верить в чудеса» (2015).
- «Перезагрузка» (2017).
- «Октава» (2018).
- «Книжечки на полке» (2019).
- «Блокадный метроном» (2019).
- «Пока звенит струна» (2020).
- «Бухта Наталья» (двойной альбом, 2022).
- «Лебединая гавань» (2022). The songs were written in 2020–2022. The song «Swans Harbor» (Russian: «Лебединая гавань») is dedicated to Hamburg.

== Books ==
- Атланты: Стихи. М., Л.: Сов. писатель, 1967.
- Новая Голландия: Стихи. Л.: Лениздат, 1971.
- Берег: Стихи. М.: Сов. писатель, 1984.
- Полночное солнце: Стихи. М.: Сов. писатель, 1990.
- Перелетные ангелы: Стихи и песни. М.: Интербук, Свердловск: Старт, 1991.
- Острова в океане: Песни. М.: МГЦАП, 1993.
- Созвездие Рыбы: Стихи. СПб.: Девятый вал, 1993.
- Остров Израиль: Стихи и песни. Иерусалим: 1995.
- Времена года: Поэмы. М.: Сампо, 1996.
- Ледяное стремя: Стихи. СПб.: Звезда, 1997.
- Атланты держит небо. Иерусалим: Беседер, 1999.
- Имена вокзалов. - СПб.: Петрополь, 1999.
- Стихи и песни. Избранное. СПб.: Лимбус Пресс, 1999.
- На материк. М.: Вагант-Москва, 1999.
- Давай поедем в Царское Село. СПб.: Бояныч, 1999.
- За временем вдогонку. М.: Вагант, 1999.
- Васильевский остров. М.: Вагант-Москва, 1999.
- Бульварное кольцо. М.: Вагант-Москва, 1999.
- Зелёный луч. М.: Вагант-Москва, 1999.
- Сочинения. М.: Локид, 2000.
- «Когда судьба поставлена на карту». М.: Эксмо, 2001.
- «И жить еще надежде». М.: Вагриус, 2001.
- Атланты. СПб.: Композитор, 2004.
- Снег. Екатеринбург: У-Фактория, 2004.
- Родство по слову. Иерусалим: Беседер, 2005.
- Гадание по ладони. СПб.: Фонд русской поэзии, 2006.
- Время для хора. М.: Радуга, 2006.
- Коломна. СПб.: Фонд русской поэзии, 2008.
- Избранное. СПб.: Вита Нова, 2008.
- Избранное. Новосибирск: Талер-Пресс, 2008 (Том 1), 2010 (Том 2).
- Ночной поезд. СПб.: Фонд русской поэзии, 2009.
- Легенда о доме. Избранные стихи и песни. М.: Азбука-классика, 2010.
- Бакинская тетрадь. Баку: Изд. Д. Имамвердиев и клуб АП Баку, 2012.
- Почему расстались. СПб.: Петрополис, 2012.
- Корабли у пирса. СПб.: Фонд русской поэзии, 2012.
- Песни разных лет. Харьков: Золотые страницы, 2013.
- Царскосельская тетрадь. СПб: Серебряный век, 2013.
- Атланты: Моя кругосветная жизнь. М.: Яуза, Эксмо, 2013.
- Атланты держат небо: Стихотворения. Песни. Поэмы. СПб.: Лениздат, 2013.
- Детям. Харьков: Золотые страницы, 2014.
- Улица времени. СПб: Фонд русской поэзии, 2014.
- Двадцать первый тревожный век: Стихи. СПб.: Лимбус Пресс, 2014.
- Тайны и мифы науки. В поисках истины. М.: Яуза, Эксмо, 2014.
- Будет помниться война. М.: Наша школа, 2015.
- Стихи и песни. М.: Эксмо, 2015.
- Стихи и песни Двадцать первого века. М.: Эксмо, 2015.
- Давайте верить. СПб: Фонд русской поэзии, 2015.
- Определение дома: Избранные стихотворения и песни. СПб.: Вита Нова, 2016.
- Осеннее равноденствие. СПб.: Фонд русской поэзии, 2016.
- Стихи и песни. М.: Яуза, Эксмо, 2016.
- Новые стихи и песни. М.: Яуза, Эксмо, 2016.
- Полное собрание песен. М., Яуза, 2017.
- Ступени Эрмитажа. СПб.: Фонд русской поэзии, 2018.
- Различие в возрасте. СПб.: Фонд русской поэзии, 2018.
- Моя маму зовут Рахиль: Стихи и песни. СПб.: Издание Бориса Бейлина, 2019.
- Между сушей и водой. СПб.: Фонд русской поэзии, 2020.
- Океан времен: Стихи и песни о русской и мировой истории. СПб., 2020.
- «Атланты держат небо...»: Воспоминания старого островитянина. М.: Яуза, 2020.
- Продление жизни. СПб.: Фонд русской поэзии, 2021.
- На ускользающей Земле. СПб.: Фонд русской поэзии, 2021.
- Дорога к Пушкину: Стихи и песни, посвященные великому русскому поэту. М.: Издательство «Академическая наука», 2021.
- Разведенные мосты. М.: Издательство «Академическая наука», 2021.
- Избранное: Стихи, песни, поэмы. М.: Яуза, 2021.
- Вечерняя тень. М.: Издательство «Академическая наука», 2022.
- Московское время: Стихи и песни о Москве. М.: Издательство «Академическая наука», 2022.
