= Alexander Dolsky =

Soviet-Russian musician (born 1938)

Alexander Alexandrovich Dolsky (Russian: Алекса́ндр Алекса́ндрович До́льский, IPA: [ɐlʲɪˈksandr ɐlʲɪˈksandrəvʲɪtɕ ˈdolʲskʲɪj]; born on June 7, 1938) is a Soviet and Russian poet, writer, artist, and most famously known for being a bard.

Dolsky was born in Sverdlovsk. He graduated from the Ural Polytechnical Institute in 1963 and in the same year he also graduated from Music school, majoring in guitar. He has lived in Saint Petersburg since 1975 where he has worked in the City Building Institute, and as an actor in the Leningrad Miniature Theater (since 1979).

Dolsky started to write songs when he was in high school (1949). He wrote music and poetry for several movies. He has also acted in a few movies. Dolsky wrote music to the poetry of French, English, American, and Russian poets. The following records were published by the recording company Melodiya:

- «Музыка над моей головой» (Music over my head)
- «Старинные часы» (1979) (Antique clock)
- «Звезда на ладони» (1980) (Star in the palm of the hand)
- «Государство синих глаз» (1981) (Nation of blue eyes)
- «Ленинградские акварели» (1983) (Leningrad aquarelles)
- «Теплые звезды» (1985) (Warm stars)
- «Прощай, ХХ век» (1987) (Good bye, ХХ century)
- «Оглянись не во гневе» (1988) (Do not look back in anger)
- «Пейзаж в раме» (1987) (Landscape in the frame)
- «На круги своя»
- «Тайная вечеря» (1991) (Last supper)
- «Российские барды. А. Дольский» (2000)

The following were published as compact disks:

- «Возвращение в Петербург» (1995) (Return to Petersburg)
- «Звезда на ладони» (1995) (Star in the palm of the hand)
- «Ангел-хранитель» (1996) (Guardian angel)
- «Недострелянная птица» (1996)
- «Туманы и дожди» (1997) (Fogs and rains)
- «Русский вопрос» (1997) (Russian question)
- «Трава и ветер» (1997) (Grass and wind)

Since 1996, 10 compact disks have been published with a mix of old and new songs:

- «Старинные часы» (Antique clock)
- «Государство синих глаз» (Nation of blue eyes)
- «Ленинградские акварели» (Leningrad aquarelles)
- «Теплые звезды» (Warm stars)
- «Прощай, ХХ век» (Good bye, ХХ century)
- «Оглянись не во гневе» (Do not look back in anger)
- «Пейзаж в раме» (Landscape in the frame)
- «Музыка над моей головой» (Music over my head)
- «На круги своя»
