= Tatyana Nikitina =

Russian bard and politician (born 1945)

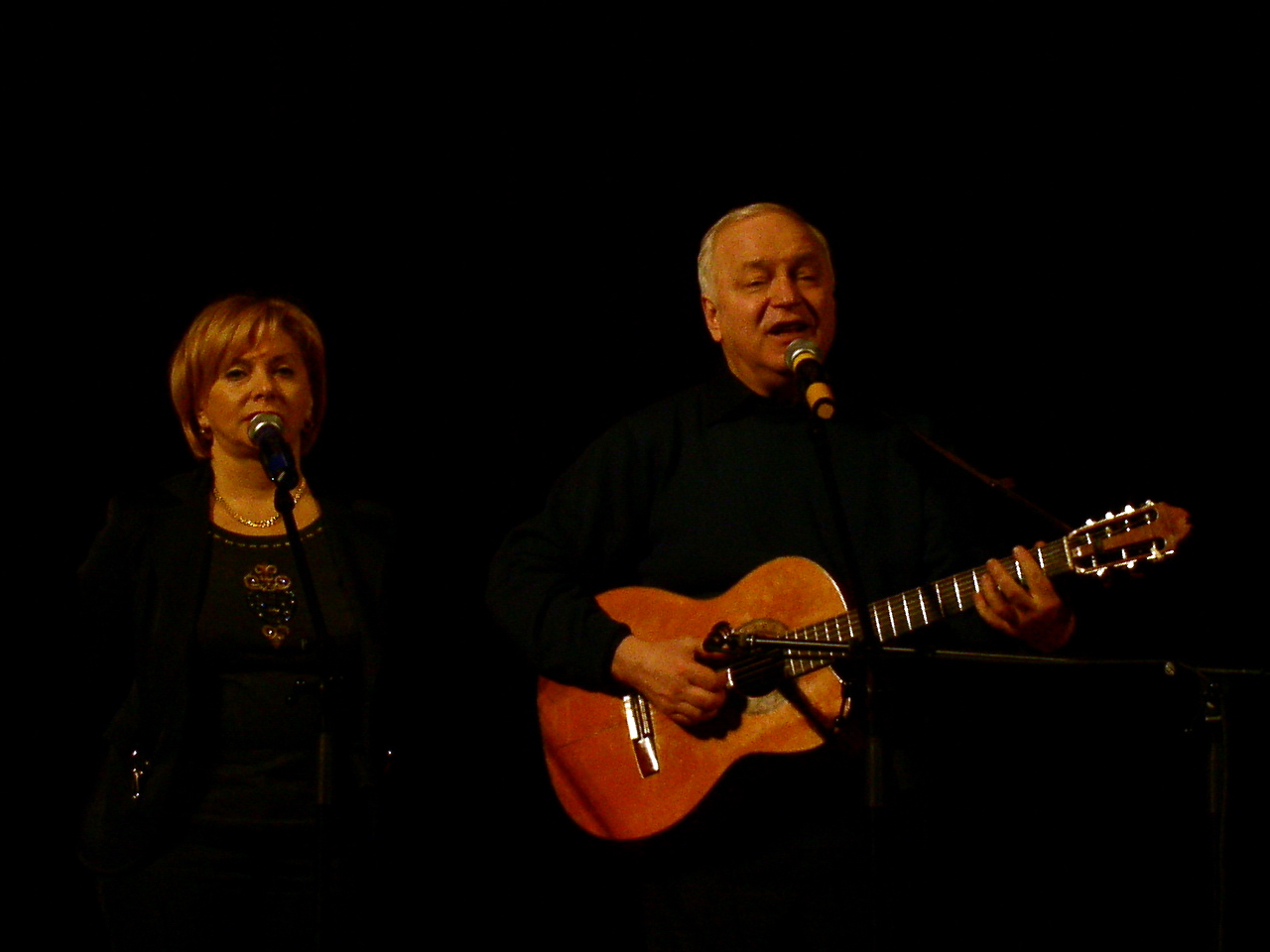
Tatyana and Sergey Nikitin

Tatyana Khashimovna Nikitina (Russian: Татьяна Хашимовна Никитина, born 31 December 1945) is a prominent Russian bard. She usually performs together with her husband, Sergey Nikitin.

== Biography ==
She was born Tatiana Sadykova in Dushanbe (currently Tajikistan) on December 31, 1945. In 1971, she graduated from the Department of Physics of Moscow State University. In 1968, she began singing in a quintet led by her husband, Sergey Nikitin. They worked together as biophysicists (both have Ph.D.s in Physics) as well as singers, creating many popular songs. Together they recorded more than 15 CDs and Vinyls (see works).

In 1990, she abandoned her research work to become the Manager for Culture of the October District ispolkom of Moscow, then became Deputy Prefect of the Central District of Moscow, and in 1992–1995 she was a deputy to the Minister for Culture of Russia. From 1998 to 2012, she worked as a manager at Kartina, an Italo-Swiss firm that organized art exhibitions.

She and her husband Sergei are very close friends with Grigory Luchansky and, beginning in 2002, the three of them provided funding to improve the Smolensk Special School for the Blind and Visually Impaired Children (Russian: Смоленская специальная школа для слепых и слабовидящих детей).
