= Sergey Nikitin (musician) =

Soviet-Russian bard (born 1944)

Sergey Nikitin Сергей Никитин
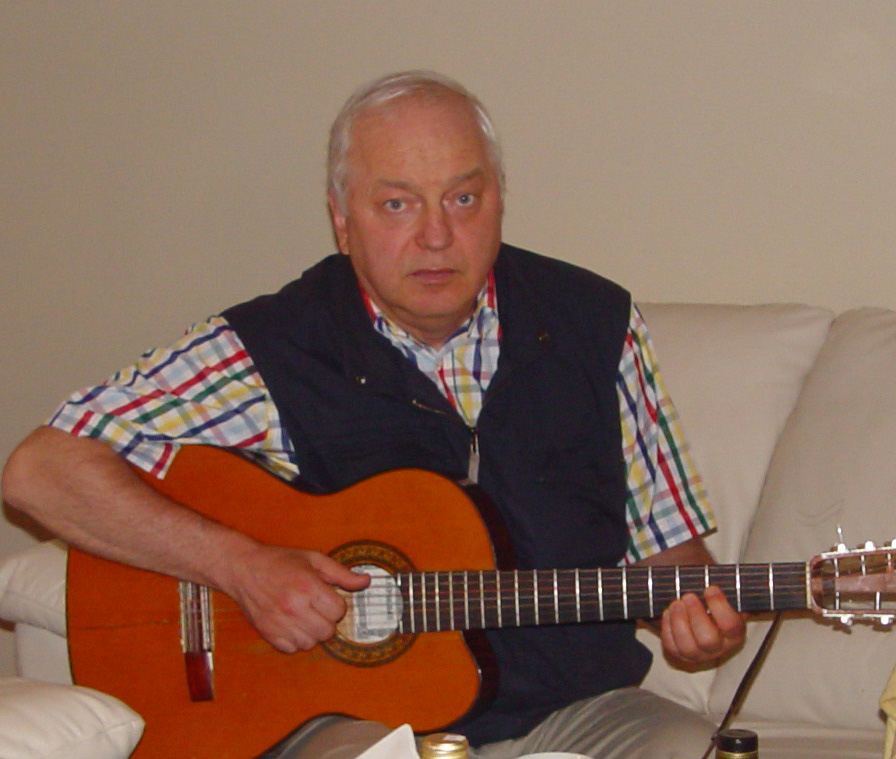
- Nikitin in 2006

Background information
- Born: 8 March 1944; Moscow, Russian SFSR, Soviet Union (present-day Russia)
- Occupation: Singer-songwriter
- Instrument: Seven-string guitar
- Years active: 1962–present
- Website: sergeytatiananikitiny.com

Sergey Yakovlevich Nikitin (Note: Russian: Сергей Яковлевич Никитин, romanized: Sergey Yakovlevich Nikitin) (born 8 March 1944) is a prominent Soviet and Russian bard, composer, and biophysicist. He performs both solo and in a duet with his wife, Tatyana Nikitina all over Russia, the former Soviet republics, and other countries with significant Russian-speaking diaspora. Nikitin is also known as a composer and performer of songs for children.

== Biography ==
Sergey Nikitin graduated from the Physics Department of Moscow State University in 1968. After completing postgraduate studies at the department of Biophysics at Moscow State University, he worked as a researcher in Zelinsky Institute of Organic Chemistry in Moscow (1971–1980). In 1980–1987 he was a researcher at the Institute of Biophysics in Pushchino and received a PhD in Physics in 1983.

Nikitin wrote music to his first song, En route (lyrics by Iosif Utkin), in 1962. In 1963, he founded an all-male quartet in the Department of Physics at Moscow State University, together with Sergey Smirnov, Boris Geller, Aleksei Monakhov, and later Vadim Khait.

From 1968 to 1977, he appeared at numerous concerts, together with other members of his quintet, including his wife, Tatyana Nikitina, Carmen Santacreu, Vladimir Ulin, and Nikolai Turkin. In 1987–1995, he was musical director at the Oleg Tabakov Studio-Theater in Moscow, and became a full-time singer and composer since 1995.

Sergei and his wife Tatyana are very close friends of Grigory Luchansky and, beginning in 2002, the three of them provided funding to improve the Smolensk Special School for the Blind and Visually Impaired Children (Russian: Смоленская специальная школа для слепых и слабовидящих детей) The waltz by Nikitin "Aleksandra" is similar to the famous Loca de Amor by Rodolfo Biagi.

== Awards ==
- 1980 The movie Moscow Does Not Believe in Tears for which Sergey Nikitin wrote the music received an Oscar in the 'best foreign film' category.
- In 1997, Sergey Nikitin was awarded the title of the Meritorious Actor of Russia and, together with Tatiana Nikitina, became a laureate of the Tzarsko-Selsky Artistic Prize.

== Works ==
- CDs
  - Records of 1971–1975, quintet of the Department of Physics in Moscow State University
  - To the Music of Vivaldi ("Под музыку Вивальди"), 1994
  - Sergei Nikitin (selected songs), 1994
  - A Big Secret for a Small Company ("Большой секрет для маленькой компании"), 1995
  - Yesterday the Crocodile smiled, 1995
  - Rubber hedgehog, songs for children on verses by Yunna Morits
  - Brich-Mulla (Sergey Nikitin's songs on verses by Dmitry Antonovich Sukharev cf. Brichmulla), 1996
  - Sentries of Love ("Часовые любви", The Nikitins sing Bulat Okudzhava's songs)
  - Field of miracles, 1998
  - We don't choose times, 1998
  - The Girl and the Plasticine, 1998
  - Something is Happening to Me (Sergey Nikitin's songs to the verses of Yevgeny Yevtushenko), 1999
  - Concert, 2000
  - Retro for the Two of Us (Sergey Nikitin and Pyotr Todorovsky)
  - Black and White Cinema, 2002
  - Winter Holiday, 2002
- Soundtracks to live-action films:
  - Almost a laughable story
  - Trips in an old car
  - Moscow Does Not Believe In Tears
  - Irony of Fate, – "Snowing On" on YouTube a song from the film, lyrics by Boris Pasternak, music and performance by Nikitin, English subtitles by V. Chetin
  - Old New Year
- Soundtracks to animated films:
  - A Big Secret for a Small Company (1979)
  - The Boy Was Walking, the Crow Was Flying (1981)
  - The Wolfskin (1982)
- Music for the theater
  - Mary Poppins, a collaboration with Viktor Berkovsky
  - Ali Baba and 40 songs of Persian Bazaar a collaboration with Viktor Berkovsky, libretto by Veniamin Smekhov
  - Opera Why are you wearing tails (based on a vaudeville by Anton Chekhov the Proposal)
  - and many others
