= Bard (Soviet Union) =

Type of song in Russia and USSR

Author song
- Native name: Авторская песня, бардовская песня
- Other names: Bard song
- Stylistic origins: Russian romance; Russian poetry
- Cultural origins: 1950s, Russian SFSR
- Typical instruments: Guitar; Vocals

Subgenres
- Tourist song; Political song; Outlaw song; Lyrical song; Bard bossa nova

Regional scenes
- Moscow

Other topics
- Russian shanson

The term bard (бард) came to be used in the Soviet Union in the early 1960s, and continues to be used in Russia and some other post-Soviet states today, to refer to singer-songwriters who wrote and performed songs outside the Soviet establishment. Because in bard music songwriters perform their own songs, the genre is also commonly referred to as author song (Russian: авторская песня, avtorskaya pesnya) or bard song (Russian: бардовская песня, bardovskaya pesnya).

Stylistically, the precursors to bard songs were Russian urban romances, which touched upon common life and were popular throughout all layers of Russian society in the late 19th to early 20th centuries. These romances were traditionally written in a minor key and performed with a guitar accompaniment.

Bard poetry may be roughly classified into two main genres: tourist song and political song, although some other subgenres are also recognized, such as outlaw song and pirate song.

Initially the term "bard" was used by fans of the tourist song genre, and outside those circles, the term was often perceived as slightly derisive. However, there was a need for a term to distinguish this style of song from the traditional mainstream pop song, and the term eventually stuck.

In the 1950s and 1960s, author's songs circulated through informal networks of students, friends and amateur performers. They were sung at gatherings, including performances in private apartments, but the movement was not confined to domestic settings. Clubs of Amateur Song (kluby samodeyatel'noy pesni, or KSP) and other organized venues also became important: regular song evenings were held at Leningrad's Vostok café from 1963, a city song club opened there in 1965, and a Moscow KSP was established in 1966.

The growing availability of reel-to-reel tape recorders enabled songs to circulate beyond the audiences who had heard them performed. Recordings were copied and passed between listeners, a practice associated with magnitizdat. This was particularly important for performers whose access to official recording and concert institutions was limited, although the circumstances varied among artists and over time. Musicologist J. Martin Daughtry examines unofficial recordings of author's song, including a likely private house performance by Alexander Galich, and shows how the recordings preserved not only the songs but also traces of their performance settings. The domestic concert tradition is also associated with the kvartirnik, a form of informal gathering in a private apartment.

== Types of songs ==
=== Tourist song ===
During the Soviet Era of Stagnation, camping, and especially its intense forms such as alpinism, kayaking/canoeing, and canyoning, became a form of escapism for young people, who felt that these activities were the only ways of life in which such values as courage, friendship, risk, trust, cooperation, and mutual support still mattered. It is these types of situations and virtues that tourist songs use for their subject.

Many of the best tourist songs were composed by Yuri Vizbor who participated and sang about all the sports described above, and Alexander Gorodnitsky who spent a great deal of time sailing around the world on ships and on scientific expeditions to the far North.

A notable subgenre of the Tourist song was the Sea song. As with other tourist songs, the goal was to sing about people in hard conditions where true physical and emotional conflicts appear. Vladimir Vysotsky had several songs of this sort, since his style suited them perfectly. Many of Alexander Gorodnitsky's songs are about the sea, since he actually had the opportunity to experience life at sea. While some songs were simply about sailors, others were about pirates. With the romanticism of songs like Brigantine by Pavel Kogan, pirate songs are still popular at author song concerts today. Almost every bard has at least one song of this type.

Tourist song was generally tolerated by the government, and it existed under the moniker author song (avtorskaya pesnya), i.e., songs sung primarily by the authors themselves, as opposed to those sung by professional singers (although professionals often "borrowed" successful author songs for their repertoires). Another name for this genre was "amateur song" (samodeyatelnaya pesnya, literally translated as "do-it-yourself song" or "self-made song"). This term reflects the cultural phenomenon of the Soviet Union called "amateur performing arts," or khudozhestvennaya samodeyatelnost. It was a widespread, often heavily subsidized, occupation of Soviet people in their spare time. Every major industrial enterprise and every kolkhoz had a Palace of Culture, or at least a House of Culture, for amateur performers to practice and perform. Many of them, as well as many universities, had Clubs of Amateur Song ("Klub samodeyatelnoy pesni", or KSP), which, in fact, were clubs of bard song and which stood quite apart from the mainstream Soviet "samodeyatelnost'".

Grushinsky festival traces its origins to tourist song fan meetings, but now includes songs from all genres.

Compare: Tramping song, a similar tradition in the Czech Republic.

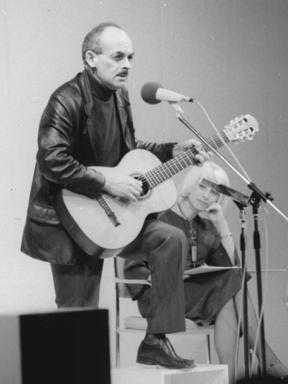
Bulat Okudzhava

=== Political song ===
Songs of this kind expressed protest against the Soviet way of life. The genre varied from acutely political, "anti-Soviet" songs to witty satire in the best traditions of Aesop. Some of Bulat Okudzhava's songs touch on these themes.

Vladimir Vysotsky was perceived as a political songwriter, although he was also part of the mainstream culture. It was not so with Alexander Galich, who was eventually forced to emigrate; owning a tape with his songs could mean a prison term in the USSR. Before emigration, he suffered from KGB persecution, as did another bard, Yuliy Kim. Others, like Evgeny Kliachkin and Aleksander Dolsky, maintained a balance between outright "anti-Soviet" and plain romantic material.

Ironically, "songs" from pro-Communist plays by Bertolt Brecht, supposedly criticizing fascism and capitalist society (and thus applauded by the Soviets), could be seen as protest songs, and hence were popular among bards. These were often called zongs (the German pronunciation of the word "song").

=== Outlaw songs ===
These songs, known in Russian as blatnaya pesnya, originated long before the bards appeared in the Soviet Union. Their origin can be traced as far back as the first decade of the 20th century. While not differing much in style from other bard songs, these songs can be compared in their content to modern rap: glorification of crime and city romance. These songs reflected the breakup of the structure and rules of the old Russian society.

Since the 1930s, new outlaw songs had emerged from the Gulag. Many of these songs were concerned with innocent people who were sent to the labour camps, rather than with criminals. Some songs were actually composed in the camps.

During the Khrushchev Thaw years, many were released from the camps, and with them came their songs. Some bards learned of these anonymous songs and started singing them. At that point, the songs gained a more symbolic meaning of struggle against oppression. Bards such as Alexander Rosenbaum also wrote many humorous outlaw songs about the Jewish mafia in Odessa. Many of these songs were inspired by authors like Isaac Babel.

=== Other songs ===
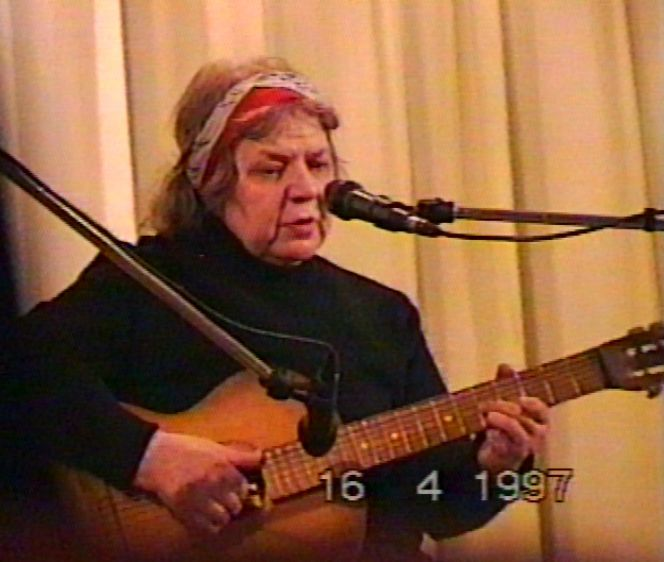
Russian bard Novella Matveyeva

Even more common than the tourist songs were songs about ordinary life (usually life in the USSR). Nearly every bard wrote a significant number of songs on this theme. The setting is very frequently urban, often in major cities such as Moscow (particularly the Arbat). Some songs of this type, such as the ones by Yuri Vizbor and Vladimir Vysotsky, took a very direct approach and used simple and honest language to illustrate life. Other bards, such as Bulat Okudzhava, took a more symbolic approach and expressed their views on life through extended metaphors and symbolism. Another type of song that appeared in Russia long before the bards was the War Song. Many of the most famous bards wrote numerous songs about war, particularly The Great Patriotic War (WWII). Bards had various reasons for writing and singing songs about war. Okudzhava, who actually fought in the war, used his sad and emotional style to illustrate the futility of war in songs such as "The Paper Soldier" ("Бумажный cолдат"). Vladimir Vysotsky wrote songs about war simply because they provided that extreme setting in which honour and emotional strength are needed, and a man's true character can be seen. Vysotsky's war songs were praised by veterans for their extreme success in portraying war, despite the fact that the poet did not actually serve in the military. Yuri Vizbor wrote war songs in which the people involved in the war were the most important element, rather than the war itself. In these songs, the war would often be happening in the background while the actual song would be in the style of the tourist song, with emphasis on nature and human emotions.

Many bards wrote songs about their hometowns, such as Vladimir Vysotsky about Moscow's "Big Karetny"("Большой Каретный"), Alexander Rosenbaum about Saint Petersburg's "Ligovka" ("Лиговка"), Leonid Dukhovny about Kyiv's "Podol" ("А Без Подола Киев Невозможен")

Some bards also wrote children's songs for various festivals and plays. These songs enjoyed great success, as the poets chose to write them in the same fashion as their other songs. This resulted in songs that, while directed at children, still had deep meaning behind them and were enjoyed by adults, not unlike Ivan Krylov's fables. The most famous bard performers who sang children's songs were the husband and wife duo Sergey Nikitin and Tatyana Nikitina. Sergey and Tatyana are still considered bards, even though they are known primarily for setting great works of poetry to their own music.

== See also ==
- Russian Chanson
- Sung poetry
- Sixtiers
