= Yuri Vizbor =

Soviet bard (1934–1984)

Yuri Vizbor Юрий Визбор
- Vizbor in c. 2010

Background information
- Born: 20 June 1934; Moscow, Russian SFSR, Soviet Union
- Died: 17 September 1984 (aged 50) Moscow, Russian SFSR, Soviet Union
- Occupations: Bard, poet, actor

Yuri Iosifovich Vizbor (Note: Russian: Юрий Иосифович Визбор; patronymic also given as Russian: Юзефович, romanized: Yuzefovich) (20 June 1934 – 17 September 1984) was a Soviet bard and poet as well as a theatre and film actor.

Vizbor was born in Moscow, where he lived for most of his life. He worked as a teacher, a soldier, a sailor, a radio and press correspondent, a ski instructor, and an actor in many Russian films and plays. He participated in and documented expeditions to remote areas of the Soviet Union. His compositions included songs, poetic prose, plays, screenplays and short stories.

== Early years ==
Vizbor's father, a commander in the Red Army, was of Lithuanian descent. His family name was originally Vizbaras. His mother was an ethnic Ukrainian from Krasnodar. In 1937, his father fell victim to Stalin's purges. In 1941, Yuri and his mother moved to Siberia. This period influenced the artist's distaste for politics and his fascination with the wilderness.

In 1951, he graduated from high school and after several failed attempts to start studies in several high-ranking universities (he was denied the place as the "son of the enemy of the People") was accepted as a student of the Moscow State Pedagogical Institute. It was here that he wrote his first song, entitled "Madagascar".

== Professional activities ==
After graduating with a degree in Russian language and literature in 1955, Vizbor worked as a teacher in Arkhangelsk. In 1957, he was conscripted to the army where he worked as a radio operator. He married in 1958. In the late 1950s and early 1960s, Vizbor began to acquire fame as a songwriter by circulating homemade tapes.

Vizbor is often compared with his contemporaries, Vladimir Vysotsky and Bulat Okudzhava. The topics of Vizbor's songs were observational, focusing on his love of nature and of travel. By using his extremely varied professions as a template, Vizbor attempted to document various aspects of "normal life" at the height of Brezhnev's era of stagnation. His trademark was a relaxed singing style that often sounded on the verge of laughter. Vizbor recorded songs with a traditional Russian seven-string guitar that was often slightly out of tune.

While most Russian bards relied on a rhythmic strumming pattern as the basis for their musical accompaniment, Vizbor was fond of a slow plucking style epitomized by songs such as "Fanskie Gory". His best-known tune was a romantic ballad called "Milaya Moya" or "My Dear." On a more somber note, his song "Seryoga Sanin" told the story of a free-spirited friend who dies tragically.

== Illness and death ==
In March 1984, Vizbor wrote his last song, having written over 250 of them during the past thirty-three years. His poetry had also been set to music by numerous musicians. His last writings were letters to his daughter from his sickbed while he lay dying of liver cancer from April to September 1984.

== Filmography ==
Year	Title	Role	Notes
1967	July Rain	Alik	
1969	Retribution	Zakharov	
1969	The Red Tent	Behounek	
1970	My Dad is A Captain	passenger	
1970	Cross the Threshold	Viktor Vasilyevicch	
1970	The Beginning	Stepan Ivanovich	
1970	Passing Through Moscow	employee of Evening Moscow	
1971	Belorussian Station	Balashov	
1971	Night Shift	Aleksandr Fyodorovich Kovalenkov	
1971	You and Me	Sasha	
1973	Seventeen Moments of Spring	Martin Bormann	6 episodes, his best known in the Soviet film
1975	Diary of a School Director	Pavlik Smirnov	
1982	Tenderness for the Roaring Beast	Odintsov	

== Legacy ==
A minor planet 3260 Vizbor discovered by Soviet astronomer Lyudmila Zhuravlyova in 1974 is named after him.

== Discography ==
- My Little Sun of Forest, 1998
